= Partizan =

Partizan may refer to:

== Sport ==
- JSD Partizan, a sports society from Belgrade, Serbia, which includes the following clubs:
  - AK Partizan, athletics
  - Biciklistički Klub Partizan, cycling
  - Džudo Klub Partizan, judo
  - FK Partizan, association football
    - FK Partizan Academy, the club's youth school
    - Partizan Stadium, the club's stadium
  - HK Partizan, ice hockey
  - Karate Klub Partizan, karate
  - KK Partizan, basketball
  - OK Partizan, volleyball
    - ŽOK Partizan, women's volleyball
  - Ragbi Klub Partizan, rugby
  - RK Partizan, handball
  - Rvački Klub Partizan, wrestling
  - Plivački Klub Partizan, swimming
  - Streljački Klub Partizan, shooting
  - Tekvondo Klub Partizan, taekwondo
  - Veslački Klub Partizan, rowing
  - VK Partizan, water polo
  - ŽKK Partizan, women basketball
- RK Partizan Bjelovar, former name of RK Bjelovar, a Croatian team handball club
- FC Partizan (disambiguation)
- FK Partizan (disambiguation)
- NK Partizan (disambiguation)
- Partizán Bardejov, Slovak association football team from Bardejov
- TJ Partizán Domaniža, Slovak association football team from Domaniža

== Places ==
- Partizan Island, an island in Antarctica
- Partizan (rural locality), several rural localities in Russia
- Partizan Fjord, in Severnaya Zemlya, Krasnoyarsk Krai, Russia

== Companies ==
- Partizan Press, a UK-based publisher of military history
- Partizan Midi-Minuit, a French company which produces videos
- Prvi Partizan, Serbian ammunition manufacturer

== Other ==
- Partizan, a term for a partisan used in several Slavic languages
- Partizan, a variant spelling of partisan, a polearm weapon used in medieval Europe
- Partizan (band), a Romanian alternative rock band
- Partizán, Hungarian media outlet

== See also ==
- Partizani (disambiguation)
- Partisan (disambiguation)
- Partisan game (or partizan game), in combinatorial game theory, a game that is not impartial
