= 2011–12 MŽRKL =

- League: MŽRKL
- Sport: Basketball
- Duration: 8 October 2011 – 4 March 2012
- Number of games: 93
- Number of teams: 10

2011–12
- Season champions: (Serbia) Partizan Galenika (1st title)
- Season MVP: (Serbia) Tamara Radočaj

WABA League seasons
- ← 2010–11 2012–13 →

MŽRKL League for the season 2011–12 was the eleventh season of the WABA League. The study included ten teams from four countries, a champion for the first time in team history became the Partizan Galenika. In this season participating clubs from Serbia, Montenegro, Bosnia and Herzegovina and from Slovenia.

MŽRKL for season 2011–12 began on 8 October 2011 and ended on 1 March 2012, when he it was completed a Regular season. Final Four to be played from 3–4 March 2012 in Zenica in Bosnia and Herzegovina. Winner Final Four this season for the team Partizan Galenika from Serbia.

== Team information ==
Country	Teams	Team	City	Venue (Capacity)
Serbia	5			
Serbia	5	Partizan	Belgrade	Belgrade Sport Palace (5,000)
Serbia	5	Radivoj Korać	Belgrade	Sport EKO Hall (1,000)
Serbia	5	Vojvodina NIS	Novi Sad	SPC Vojvodina (1,030)
Serbia	5	Voždovac	Belgrade	SC Šumice (2.000)
Serbia	5	Hemofarm Štada	Vršac	Millennium Center (5.000)
Bosnia and Herzegovina	3			
Bosnia and Herzegovina	3	Čelik	Zenica	Arena Zenica (6,200)
Bosnia and Herzegovina	3	Mladi Krajišnik	Banja Luka	Sport hall Obilićevo (800)
Bosnia and Herzegovina	3	Sloboda	Novi Grad	Sport hall Novi Grad (800)
Slovenia	1			
Slovenia	1	Athlete Celje	Celje	Dvorana Gimnazije Celje - Center (1,500)
Montenegro	1			
Montenegro	1	Budućnost	Podgorica	Morača Sports Center (4,570)

== Regular season ==
The League of the season was played with 10 teams and play a dual circuit system, each with each one game at home and away. The four best teams at the end of the regular season were placed in the Final Four. The regular season began on 8 October 2011 and it will end on 1 March 2012.

Place	Team	Pld	W	L	PF	PA	Diff	Pts	
1.	(Serbia) Partizan Galenika	18	17	1	1516	1155	+361	35	Final Four
2.	(Bosnia and Herzegovina) Čelik Zenica	18	13	5	1302	1240	+62	31	Final Four
3.	(Serbia) Hemofarm Štada	18	12	6	1301	1117	+184	30	Final Four
4.	(Serbia) Voždovac	18	11	7	1226	1211	+15	29	Final Four
5.	(Serbia) Radivoj Korać	18	11	7	1263	1256	+7	29	
6.	(Slovenia) Athlete Celje	18	9	9	1341	1319	+22	27	
7.	(Bosnia and Herzegovina) Mladi Krajišnik	18	7	11	1280	1243	+37	25	
8.	(Montenegro) Budućnost Podgorica	18	7	11	1139	1312	-173	25	
9.	(Serbia) Vojvodina NIS	18	2	16	1105	1269	-164	20	
10.	(Bosnia and Herzegovina) Sloboda	18	1	17	1089	1440	-351	19	

1. round
(8.10.)	Partizan - Hemofarm	70:62
(8.10.)	Voždovac - Mladi Krajišnik	73:67
(8.10.)	Vojvodina - Celje	68:85
(9.10.)	Budućnost - Čelik	59:53
(9.10.)	Radivoj Korać - Sloboda	81:66

2. round
(15.10.)	Hemofarm - Sloboda	94:56
(15.10.)	Čelik - Radivoj Korać	68:60
(15.10.)	Celje - Budućnost	87:73
(15.10.)	Mladi Krajišnik - Vojvodina	70:56
(15.10.)	Partizan - Voždovac	82:76

3. round
(21.10.)	Voždovac - Hemofarm	54:68
(21.10.)	Vojvodina - Partizan	61:65
(22.10.)	Budućnost - Mladi Krajišnik	68:56
(22.10.)	Radivoj Korać - Celje	77:70
(22.10.)	Sloboda - Čelik	57:106

4. round
(29.10.)	Hemofarm - Čelik	76:56
(29.10.)	Celje - Sloboda	94:56
(29.10.)	Mladi Krajišnik -	78:82
(29.10.)	Radivoj Korać - Celje	90:58
(29.10.)	Voždovac - Vojvodina	74:68

5. round
(4.11.)	Vojvodina - Hemofarm	42:65
(6.11.)	Budućnost - Voždovac	66:70
(6.11.)	Radivoj Korać- Partizan	66:78
(6.11.)	Sloboda - Mladi Krajišnik	55:84
(6.11.)	Čelik - Celje	74:71

6. round
(12.11.)	Hemofarm - Celje	65:58
(12.11.)	Mladi Krajišnik - Čelik	73:76
(13.11.)	Partizan - Celje	125:57
(13.11.)	Voždovac - Radivoj Korać	67:59
(12.11.)	Vojvodina - Budućnost	62:65

7. round
(19.11.)	Budućnost - Hemofarm	62:59
(19.11.)	Radivoj Korać - Vojvodina	74:67
(19.11.)	Sloboda - Voždovac	61:75
(14.12.)	Čelik - Partizan	71:87
(19.11.)	Celje - Mladi Krajišnik	67:61

8. round
(26.11.)	Hemofarm - Mladi Krajišnik	77:70
(26.11.)	Partizan - Celje	101:62
(27.11.)	Voždovac - Čelik	69:70
(26.11.)	Vojvodina - Sloboda	78:60
(26.11.)	Budućnost - Radivoj Korać	78:85

9. round
(3.12.)	Radivoj Korać - Hemofarm	76:75
(3.12.)	Sloboda - Budućnost	77:80
(3.12.)	Čelik - Vojvodina	73:62
(3.12.)	Celje - Voždovac	69:57
(4.12.)	Mladi Krajišnik - Partizan	88:90

10. round
(11.12.)	Hemofarm - Partizan	63:70
(10.12.)	Mladi Krajišnik - Voždovac	52:56
(10.12.)	Celje - Vovjvodina	79:72
(10.12.)	Čelik - Budućnost	72:63
(11.12.)	Sloboda - Radivoj Korać	49:69

11. round
(14.12.)	Sloboda - Hemofarm	60:67
(17.12.)	Radivoj Korać - Čelik	78:80
(17.12.)	Budućnost - Celje	48:77
(16.12.)	Vojvodina - Mladi Krajišnik	59:66
(31.1.)	Voždovac - Partizan	74:72

12. round
(23.12.)	Hemofarm - Voždovac	87:54
(17.1.)	Partizan - Vojvovidna	100:60
(14.1.)	Mladi Krajišnik - Budućnost	73:50
(23.12.)	Celje - Radivoj Korać	82:83
(15.1.)	Čelik - Sloboda	66:55

13. round
(22.1.)	Čelik - Hemofarm	75:64
(21.1.)	Sloboda - Celje	77:90
(21.1.)	Radivoj Korać - Mladi Krajišnik	66:56
(21.1.)	Budućnost - Partizan	46:84
(22.1.)	Vojvodina - Voždovac	54:47

14. round
(28.1.)	Hemofarm - Vojvodina	75:50
(28.1.)	Voždovac - Budućnost	82:63
(28.1.)	Partizan - Radivoj Korać	82:56
(28.1.)	Mladi Krajišnik - Sloboda	80:74
(28.1.)	Celje - Čelik	77:68

15. round
(1.2.)	Celje - Hemofarm	72:76
(15.2.)	Čelik - Mladi Krajišnik	72:63
(19.2.)	Sloboda - Partizan	62:64
(22.2.)	Radivoj Korać - Voždovac	62:68
(23.2.)	Budućnost - Vojvodina	74:67

16. round
(28.2.)	Hemofarm - Budućnost	73:63
(11.2.)	Vojvodina - Radivoj Korać	51:56
(11.2.)	Voždovac - Sloboda	71:53
(11.2.)	Partizan - Čelik	81:62
(11.2.)	Mladi Krajišnik - Celje	80:65

17. round
(22.2.)	Mladi Krajišnik - Hemofarm	90:75
(18.2.)	Celje - Partizan	58:93
(18.2.)	Čelik - Voždovac	80:69
(17.2.)	Slboda - Vojvodina	61:52
(1.3.)	Radivoj Korać - Budućnost	94:59

18. round
(26.2.)	Hemofarm - Radivoj Korać	82:39
(25.2.)	Budućnost - Sloboda	64:53
(25.2.)	Vojvodina - Čelik	76:80
(26.2.)	Voždovac - Celje	90:78
(25.2.)	Partizan - Mladi Krajišnik	82:73

== Final four ==
Final Four to be played from 3–4 March 2012. in the Arena Zenica in Zenica, Bosnia and Herzegovina.

club 1	result	club 2
semifinals
(Serbia) Partizan Galenika	84:61	(Serbia) Voždovac
(Bosnia and Herzegovina) Čelik Zenica	77:72	(Serbia) Hemofarm Štada
final
(Bosnia and Herzegovina) Čelik Zenica	65:74	(Serbia) Partizan Galenika

2011–12 MŽRKL

Partizan Galenika
1st Title

== Awards ==
- Player of the Year: Tamara Radočaj (170-PG-87) of Partizan Galenika (Serbia)
- Guard of the Year: Tamara Radočaj (170-PG-87) of Partizan Galenika (Serbia)
- Forward of the Year: Tina Trebec (189-F-90) of Athlete Celje (Slovenia)
- Center of the Year: Anna Tolikova (190-C-86) of Čelik Zenica (Bosnia and Herzegovina)
- Defensive Player of the Year: Dragana Stanković (188-F-95) of Sloboda Novi Grad (Bosnia and Herzegovina)
- Coach of the Year: Marina Maljković of Partizan Galenika (Serbia)

1st Team

- PG: Tamara Radočaj (170-87) of Partizan Galenika (Serbia)
- G: Saša Čađo (178-89) of Hemofarm Štada (Serbia)
- F: Tina Trebec (189-90) of Athlete Celje (Slovenia)
- C: Nataša Popović (194-82) of Budućnost Podgorica (Montenegro)
- C: Anna Tolikova (190-86) of Čelik Zenica (Bosnia and Herzegovina)

2nd Team

- PG: Milica Dabović (175-82) of Partizan Galenika (Serbia)
- G: Biljana Stanković (176-74) of Hemofarm Štada (Serbia)
- F: Alicia Gladden (178-85) of Partizan Galenika (Serbia)
- F: Dragana Stanković (188-95) of Sloboda Novi Grad (Bosnia and Herzegovina)
- C: Ivona Bogoje (193-76) of Mladi Krajišnik (Bosnia and Herzegovina)

Honorable Mention

- Milica Deura (178-G-90) of Mladi Krajišnik (Bosnia and Herzegovina)
- Jasmina Bigović (174-G-79) of Budućnost Podgorica (Montenegro)
- Zvjezdana Gagić (169-G-81) of Sloboda Novi Grad (Bosnia and Herzegovina)
- Teja Oblak (171-G-90) of Athlete Celje (Slovenia)
- Josipa Bura (185-C-85) of Čelik Zenica (Bosnia and Herzegovina)
- Nevena Jovanović (179-G-90) of Radivoj Korać (Serbia)
- Biljana Stjepanović (189-C-87) of Radivoj Korać (Serbia)
- Nikolina Popović (184-G/F-84) of Budućnost Podgorica (Montenegro)
- Tijana Ajduković (197-C-91) of Hemofarm Štada (Serbia)
