= 2018–19 Basketball League of Serbia =

Basketball League of Serbia
- Season: 2018–19
- Duration: October 6, 2018 – March 17, 2019 (First League); April 26, 2019 – May 20, 2019 (Super League); June 2, 2019 – June 2019 (Playoffs)
- Teams: 18
- TV partner(s): Arena Sport

Regular season
- Season MVP: (Serbia) Đukan Đukanović
- Relegated: Spartak; Beovuk 72

Finals
- Champions: Crvena zvezda mts (20th title)
- Runners-up: Partizan NIS
- Semifinalists: FMP; Mega Bemax
- Finals MVP: (United States) Billy Baron

Awards
- SuperLeague MVP: (Georgia (country)) Goga Bitadze

Records
- Winning streak: Crvena zvezda mts 13 games
- Losing streak: Beovuk 72; 12 games
- All statistics correct as of June 11, 2019.

The 2018–19 Basketball League of Serbia (Serbian Cyrillic: Кошаркашка лига Србије 2018–19.) is the 13th season of the Basketball League of Serbia, the highest professional basketball league in Serbia. Also, it's the 75th national championship played by Serbian clubs inclusive of nation's previous incarnations as Yugoslavia and Serbia & Montenegro.

== Teams ==
=== Distribution ===
The following is the access list for this season.

Access list for 2018–19 Serbian League
	Teams entering in this round	Teams advancing from the previous round
First League (14 teams)	12 highest-placed teams from the last season; 2 highest-placed teams from the Second League	
Super League (12 teams)	4 Adriatic League teams (Crvena zvezda mts, FMP, Mega Bemax, Partizan NIS)	8 highest-placed teams from the First League
Playoffs (4 teams)		2 group winners from the Super League; 2 group runners-up from the Super League

=== Promotion and relegation ===
Teams promoted from the Second League

- Sloboda
- Novi Pazar

Teams relegated to the Second League

- Sloga
- Kragujevački Radnički

=== Venues and locations ===
Location of teams in the 2018–19 season

Team	Home city	Arena	Capacity
Beovuk 72	Belgrade	SC Šumice	2,000
Borac	Čačak	Borac Hall	2,000
Crvena zvezda mts	Belgrade	Aleksandar Nikolić Hall	5,878
Dunav	Stari Banovci	Park Hall	
Dynamic VIP PAY	Belgrade	Dynamic Arena	500
FMP	Belgrade	Železnik Hall	3,000
Mega Bemax	Sremska Mitrovica	Mega Factory	700
Metalac	Valjevo	Valjevo Sports Hall	1,500
Mladost	Zemun	Master Sport Center	750
Novi Pazar	Novi Pazar	Pendik Sports Hall	1,600
OKK Beograd	Belgrade	Mega Factory	700
Partizan NIS	Belgrade	Aleksandar Nikolić Hall	5,878
Sloboda	Užice	Veliki Park Hall	2,200
Spartak	Subotica	SC Dudova Šuma	3,000
Tamiš	Pančevo	Strelište Sports Hall	1,100
Vojvodina	Novi Sad	SPC Vojvodina	7,022
Vršac	Vršac	Millennium Center	4,400
Zlatibor	Čajetina	WAI TAI - STC Zlatibor	712

Teams that play in the 2018–19 First Adriatic League
Teams that play in the 2018–19 Second Adriatic League

=== Personnel and sponsorship ===
Team	Head coach	Captain	Kit manufacturer	Shirt sponsor
Beovuk 72	(Serbia) Rajko Mirković	(Serbia) Stefan Živanović	—	—
Borac	(Serbia) Jovica Arsić	(Serbia) Marko Marinović	—	P.S. Fashion
Crvena zvezda mts	(Serbia) Milan Tomić	(Serbia) Branko Lazić	Nike	mts
Dunav	(Serbia) Mitar Ašćerić	(Serbia) Aleksandar Miljković	Cvetex	Best Shop Group
Dynamic VIP PAY	(Slovenia) Miro Alilović	(Serbia) Vuk Vulikić	NAAI	VIP PAY
FMP	(Serbia) Vladimir Jovanović	(Serbia) Radoš Šešlija	Champion	FMP
Mega Bemax	(Serbia) Dejan Milojević	(Serbia) Stefan Fundić	Adidas	Bemax
Metalac	(Serbia) Mihailo Poček	(Serbia) Aleksandar Vasić	—	—
Mladost	(Serbia) Marko Barać	(Serbia) Aleksa Novaković	—	—
Novi Pazar	(Serbia) Oliver Popović	(Serbia) Nenad Slavković	Cvetex	Barbosa
OKK Beograd	(Serbia) Branislav Vićentić	(Serbia) Đorđe Simeunović	Adidas	—
Partizan NIS	(Italy) Andrea Trinchieri	(Serbia) Novica Veličković	Under Armour	NIS, mts
Sloboda	(Serbia) Vladimir Lučić	(Serbia) Nikola Otašević	Ardu	Grad Užice, TV Lav
Spartak	(Serbia) Slobodan Bjalica	(Serbia) Miloš Nikolić	—	—
Tamiš	(Serbia) Bojan Jovičić	(Serbia) Dušan Knežević	unit-sport	Grad Pančevo
Vojvodina	(Serbia) Filip Socek	(Serbia) Dušan Prica	Peak	Roda
Vršac	(Greece) Darko Kostić	(Montenegro) Miloš Savović	Spirit	Villager
Zlatibor	(Serbia) Strajin Nedović	(Serbia) Radenko Smolović	Ardu	Dino park

=== Coaching changes ===
Round	Team	Outgoing coach	Date(s) of change	Incoming coach	Ref.
Off-season	OKK Beograd	(Greece) Darko Kostić	June 2018	(Serbia) Branislav Vićentić	
Off-season	Beovuk 72	(Serbia) Slobodan Srezoski	June 2018	(Serbia) Rajko Mirković	
Off-season	Novi Pazar	(Serbia) Boško Đokić	21 June 2018	(Serbia) Oliver Popović	
Off-season	Dynamic VIP PAY	(Serbia) Miroslav Nikolić	4 July 2018	(Serbia) Vladimir Đokić	
Off-season	Crvena zvezda mts	(Serbia) Milenko Topić	13 July 2018	(Serbia) Milan Tomić	
Off-season	Mladost Zemun	(Serbia) Branko Maksimović	July 2018	(Serbia) Marko Barać	
Off-season	Spartak Subotica	(Serbia) Dragoljub Vidačić	August 2018	(Serbia) Slobodan Ljubotina	
Off-season	Vršac	(Serbia) Mihajlo Mitić	24 August 2018	(Serbia) Branko Maksimović	
ABA	Partizan	(Serbia) Nenad Čanak	26–31 October 2018	(Italy) Andrea Trinchieri	
15th	Vršac	(Serbia) Branko Maksimović	4 January 2019	(Greece) Darko Kostić	
16th	Spartak Subotica	(Serbia) Slobodan Ljubotina	18 January 2019	(Serbia) Slobodan Bjelica	
23rd	Zlatibor	(Serbia) Vanja Guša	February 2019	(Serbia) Strajin Nedović	
Mid-season	Dynamic VIP PAY	(Serbia) Vladimir Đokić	10 April 2019	(Slovenia) Miro Alilović	

== First League ==
=== League table ===
Pos	Team	Pld	W	L	PF	PA	PD	Pts	Qualification or relegation
1	Borac	26	22	4	2301	1910	+391	48	Qualification to the Super League and the 2019–20 ABA 2
2	Novi Pazar	26	20	6	2266	2052	+214	46	Qualification to the Super League and the 2019–20 ABA 2
3	Dynamic VIP PAY	26	20	6	2234	1928	+306	46	Qualification to the Super League and the 2019–20 ABA 2
4	OKK Beograd	26	17	9	2245	2117	+128	43	Qualification to the Super League
5	Zlatibor	26	15	11	2039	1953	+86	41	Qualification to the Super League
6	Tamiš	26	12	14	2184	2128	+56	38	Qualification to the Super League
7	Sloboda	26	12	14	2311	2291	+20	38	Qualification to the Super League
8	Dunav	26	11	15	2072	2221	−149	37	Qualification to the Super League
9	Vršac	26	11	15	2186	2283	−97	37	
10	Vojvodina	26	11	15	2299	2442	−143	37	
11	Mladost	26	11	15	2117	2179	−62	37	
12	Metalac	26	10	16	2128	2217	−89	36	
13	Spartak	26	7	19	1965	2220	−255	33	Relegation to Second League
14	Beovuk 72	26	3	23	2004	2410	−406	29	Relegation to Second League

Source: Basketball League of Serbia

=== Positions by round ===
First place & advance to the Super League
Advance to the Super League
Relegated

Team ╲ Round	1	2	3	4	5	6	7	8	9	10	11	12	13	14	15	16	17	18	19	20	21	22	23	24	25	26
Borac	3	4	3	3	1	1	1	3	2	1	1	1	1	1	1	1	1	1	1	1	1	1	1	1	1	1
Novi Pazar	6	3	4	4	4	4	4	4	3	2	2	2	3	2	2	2	2	2	3	3	3	3	3	3	3	2
Dynamic VIP PAY	2	1	1	1	2	2	2	1	4	4	3	3	2	3	3	3	3	3	2	2	2	2	2	2	2	3
OKK Beograd	1	2	2	2	3	3	3	2	1	3	4	4	4	4	4	4	4	4	4	4	4	4	4	4	4	4
Zlatibor	4	6	7	8	8	10	7	9	7	6	6	6	6	5	5	5	7	7	7	7	7	6	5	5	5	5
Tamiš	5	9	11	11	7	9	6	6	6	5	5	5	5	6	6	6	6	6	6	5	5	5	6	6	6	6
Sloboda	11	5	6	7	11	8	5	8	5	8	7	7	7	7	7	7	5	5	5	6	6	7	7	7	9	7
Dunav	14	14	13	13	10	7	10	5	10	11	8	8	10	10	10	12	12	12	12	12	12	12	12	11	12	8
Vršac	8	11	8	10	9	12	11	11	11	9	11	11	9	9	8	8	9	11	9	10	10	9	10	9	7	9
Vojvodina	9	8	5	5	5	5	8	7	8	7	9	9	8	8	9	9	10	8	10	11	11	11	11	10	10	10
Mladost	12	7	9	9	12	11	12	12	12	12	12	12	13	11	11	10	8	10	8	8	9	10	8	8	8	11
Metalac	10	12	12	12	13	13	13	14	14	13	13	13	11	13	12	11	11	9	11	9	8	8	9	12	11	12
Spartak	7	10	10	6	6	6	9	10	9	10	10	10	12	12	13	13	13	13	13	13	13	13	13	13	13	13
Beovuk 72	13	13	14	14	14	14	14	13	13	14	14	14	14	14	14	14	14	14	14	14	14	14	14	14	14	14

Source: Basketball League of Serbia

=== Results ===
Home \ Away	BOR	NPZ	DYN	OKK	ZLA	TAM	SLO	DUN	VRS	VOJ	MLA	MET	SPA	BEO
Borac	—	84–72	88–82	83–52	86–78	86–64	98–66	94–85	102–83	101–60	72–61	88–71	101–74	103–66
Novi Pazar	77–68	—	83–71	104–79	83–77	88–75	98–99	91–78	101–98	103–95	92–67	77–71	103–73	93–72
Dynamic VIP PAY	61–50	80–72	—	95–84	95–94	72–95	96–87	95–62	79–62	99–87	100–75	85–87	85–57	72–81
OKK Beograd	91–81	87–81	70–84	—	83–75	86–72	93–101	84–77	103–92	95–78	81–82	90–75	88–66	80–77
Zlatibor	64–86	100–86	75–71	50–62	—	72–69	100–79	80–66	87–71	93–64	79–68	89–91	67–56	50–62
Tamiš	66–83	79–84	74–86	71–82	83–91	—	83–82	99–77	83–89	97–80	80–71	84–75	91–77	108–75
Sloboda	82–93	77–78	88–80	88–90	82–84	88–95	—	105–79	88–77	99–89	92–86	96–91	92–94	93–84
Dunav	87–104	81–73	72–82	66–105	79–74	83–82	79–78	—	87–91	101–95	79–73	95–67	79–70	91–87
Vršac	88–107	77–89	79–96	95–83	90–82	68–100	87–86	68–69	—	103–87	82–77	80–73	88–87	85–78
Vojvodina	87–96	72–96	70–85	97–91	95–86	77–95	94–86	89–75	118–113	—	114–109	101–98	114–103	94–91
Mladost	77–88	67–95	68–87	82–89	83–91	80–73	89–83	77–95	99–92	90–74	—	77–71	87–78	95–56
Metalac	81–70	71–81	68–111	87–91	80–72	87–106	80–100	82–73	80–66	92–81	94–98	—	98–102	91–63
Spartak	74–77	73–75	70–90	96–89	86–94	90–87	86–91	84–66	72–68	68–87	70–99	66–86	—	99–90
Beovuk 72	61–112	81–91	60–95	62–117	79–85	99–103	88–103	92–91	70–94	77–100	72–80	75–81	102–80	—

Updated to match(es) played on March 17, 2019. Source: Basketball League of Serbia
Legend: Blue = home team win; Red = away team win.

== Super League ==
=== Qualified teams ===
First Adriatic League	First League
Crvena zvezda mts FMP; Mega Bemax; Partizan NIS	Borac; Dynamic VIP PAY; Novi Pazar; OKK Beograd; Zlatibor; Tamiš; Sloboda; Dunav

=== Group A ===
==== Standings and results ====
Pos	Team	Pld	W	L	PF	PA	PD	Pts	Qualification	CZV	FMP	BOR	ZLA	OKK	DUN
1	Crvena zvezda mts	10	10	0	854	630	+224	20	Qualification to the Playoffs	—	82–65	86–58	83–57	82–50	101–60
2	FMP	10	8	2	824	688	+136	18	Qualification to the Playoffs	62–77	—	89–69	96–50	97–87	89–47
3	Borac	10	6	4	776	799	−23	16		67–77	59–73	—	70–63	89–81	107–94
4	Zlatibor	10	3	7	728	803	−75	13		68–82	61–74	74–80	—	74–87	86–66
5	OKK Beograd	10	2	8	807	884	−77	12		78–93	89–100	90–97	76–89	—	88–92
6	Dunav	10	1	9	723	908	−185	11		65–91	67–79	72–80	89–106	71–81	—

Source: Basketball League of Serbia

==== Positions by round ====
First place & advance to the Playoffs
Advance to the Playoffs

Team ╲ Round	1	2	3	4	5	6	7	8	9	10
Crvena zvezda mts	1	1	1	1	1	1	1	1	1	1
FMP	2	2	2	2	2	2	2	2	2	2
Borac	3	3	3	3	3	3	3	3	3	3
Zlatibor	5	5	4	4	4	4	4	5	5	4
OKK Beograd	4	4	5	5	5	5	5	4	4	5
Dunav	6	6	6	6	6	6	6	6	6	6

Source: Basketball League of Serbia

=== Group B ===
==== Standings and results ====
Pos	Team	Pld	W	L	PF	PA	PD	Pts	Qualification	PAR	MEG	DYN	NPZ	TAM	SLO
1	Partizan NIS	10	10	0	894	656	+238	20	Qualification to the Playoffs	—	102–69	96–58	93–67	84–80	85–49
2	Mega Bemax	10	7	3	969	837	+132	17	Qualification to the Playoffs	81–90	—	125–98	97–95	102–64	96–66
3	Dynamic VIP PAY	10	5	5	807	908	−101	15		62–91	102–98	—	116–113	77–76	85–79
4	Novi Pazar	10	4	6	864	867	−3	14		66–81	88–71	73–80	—	92–84	81–90
5	Tamiš	10	2	8	745	880	−135	12		62–88	69–121	72–64	72–89	—	90–77
6	Sloboda	10	2	8	753	884	−131	12		62–84	80–105	81–82	83–100	86–76	—

Source: Basketball League of Serbia

==== Positions by round ====
First place & advance to the Playoffs
Advance to the Playoffs

Team ╲ Round	1	2	3	4	5	6	7	8	9	10
Partizan NIS	1	1	1	1	1	1	1	1	1	1
Mega Bemax	6	5	2	2	2	2	2	2	2	2
Dynamic VIP PAY	4	2	6	5	4	3	3	3	3	3
Novi Pazar	5	6	5	6	6	4	4	4	4	4
Tamiš	3	3	4	3	3	5	5	5	5	5
Sloboda	2	4	3	4	5	6	6	6	6	6

Source: Basketball League of Serbia

== Playoffs ==
The playoffs are scheduled to start on June 2, 2019, and end on June 20, 2019.

=== Bracket ===
Semifinals
2–4 June
Crvena zvezda mts	2
Mega Bemax	0
3–7 June
Partizan NIS	2
FMP	1

Finals
10–17 June
Crvena zvezda mts	3
Partizan NIS	1

=== Semifinals ===
Team 1	Series	Team 2	Game 1	Game 2	Game 3
Crvena zvezda mts	2–0	Mega Bemax	83–72	96–91	—
Partizan NIS	2–1	FMP	93–75	85–88	97–59

=== Finals ===
Team 1	Series	Team 2	Game 1	Game 2	Game 3	Game 4	Game 5
Crvena zvezda mts	3–1	Partizan NIS	98–94	72–73	96–90	76–75	—

2018–19 Basketball League of Serbia Champions

Crvena zvezda mts
20th title

== Clubs in European competitions ==
Team	Competition	Progress
Crvena zvezda mts	EuroCup	Top 16
Partizan NIS	EuroCup	Top 16

== See also ==
- 2018–19 Second Men's League of Serbia (basketball)
- 2018–19 Radivoj Korać Cup
- 2018–19 ABA League First Division
- 2018–19 ABA League Second Division
- 2018–19 Women's Basketball League of Serbia
- 2018–19 KK Crvena zvezda season
- 2018–19 KK Partizan season
