= 2012–13 MŽRKL =

- League: Adriatic League
- Sport: Basketball
- Duration: 26 September 2012 – 3 March 2013
- Games: 104
- Teams: 11
- TV partner: (Serbia) RTV

2012–13
- Season champions: (Serbia) Partizan Galenika (2nd title)
- Season MVP: (Serbia) Milica Dabović

WABA League seasons
- ← 2011–12 2013–14 →

MŽRKL League for the season 2012–13 was the eleventh season of the Adriatic League. The study included eleven teams from four countries, a champion for the second time in team history became the Partizan Galenika. In this season participating clubs from Serbia, Bosnia and Herzegovina, Slovenia and from Hungary.

MŽRKL League for the season 2012–13 has begun to play 26 September 2012 and ended on 23 February 2013, when he it was completed a Regular season. Final Four to be played from 2–3 March 2013. in Novi Sad, Serbia. Winner Final Four this season for the team Partizan Galenika from Serbia.

Cadet MŽRKL League this season playing for the first time. It was intended to be played this season, and in the case of success to continue next season. Cadet MŽRKL League comprises 11 teams, where each team plays each at once. One team is organizing a mini tournament where four teams play two rounds of the league for a weekend and so once a month. Top 4 teams qualify for the Final Four to be played in the same place for seniors and the same weekend play. Winner Final Four this season for the first time in team history became the team Trešnjevka 2009 from Croatia.

== Team information ==
Country	Teams	Team	City	Venue (Capacity)
Serbia	5			
Serbia	5	Partizan	Belgrade	Belgrade Sport Palace (5,000)
Serbia	5	Radivoj Korać	Belgrade	Sport EKO Hall (1,000)
Serbia	5	Vojvodina NIS	Novi Sad	SPC Vojvodina (1,030)
Serbia	5	Voždovac	Belgrade	SC Šumice (2.000)
Serbia	5	Vršac	Vršac	Millennium Center (5.000)
Bosnia and Herzegovina	3			
Bosnia and Herzegovina	3	Čelik	Zenica	Arena Zenica (6,200)
Bosnia and Herzegovina	3	Mladi Krajišnik	Banja Luka	Sport hall Obilićevo (800)
Bosnia and Herzegovina	3	Sloboda	Novi Grad	Sport hall Novi Grad (800)
Slovenia	2			
Slovenia	2	Athlete Celje	Celje	Dvorana Gimnazije Celje - Center (1,500)
Slovenia	2	Subrina Ilirija	Ljubljana	ŠRC Ježica (300)
Hungary	1	Peac-Pécs	Pécs	Lauber Dezső Sports Hall (3000)

== Regular season ==
The League of the season was played with 11 teams and play a dual circuit system, each with each one game at home and away. The four best teams at the end of the regular season were placed in the Final Four. The regular season began on 26 September 2012 and it will end on 23 February 2013.

Place	Team	Pld	W	L	PF	PA	Diff	Pts	
1.	(Serbia) Partizan Galenika	20	20	0	1584	1043	+541	40	Final Four
2.	(Serbia) Radivoj Korać	20	16	4	1328	1071	+257	36	Final Four
3.	(Hungary) Peac-Pécs	20	14	6	1314	1267	+47	34	Final Four
4.	(Serbia) Vojvodina NIS	20	14	3	1385	1229	+156	34	Final Four
5.	(Bosnia and Herzegovina) Mladi Krajišnik	20	10	10	1229	1138	+91	30	
6.	(Bosnia and Herzegovina) Čelik Zenica	20	10	10	1258	1203	+55	30	
7.	(Slovenia) Athlete Celje	20	7	13	1122	1325	-203	27	
8.	(Bosnia and Herzegovina) Sloboda Novi Grad	20	7	13	1133	1359	-226	27	
9.	(Serbia) Vršac	20	5	15	1105	1346	-197	25	
10.	(Serbia) Voždovac (-7)	20	7	13	905	1002	-97	20	
11.	(Slovenia) Subrina Ilirija (-11)	20	0	20	486	910	-424	9	

1. round
(26.9.)	Čelik - Subrina Ilirija	74:48
(26.9.)	Vršac - Mladi Krajišnik	52:70
(25.9.)	Voždovac - Peac-Pecs	64:69
(26.9.)	Sloboda - Radivoj Korać	42:73
(26.9.)	Vojvodina - Celje	74:56

2. round
(29.9.)	Subrina Ilirija - Celje	68:80
(1.10.)	Radivoj Korać - Vojvodina	74:68
(29.9.)	Peac-Pecs - Sloboda	90:47
(30.9.)	Partizan - Voždovac	71:68
(29.9.)	Čelik - Vršac	84:53

3. round
(6.10.)	Vršac - Subrina Ilirija	64:50
(7.10.)	Voždovac - Mladi Krajišnik	84:77
(6.10.)	Sloboda - Partizan	62:86
(23.9.)	Vojvodina - Peac-Pecs	65:69
(6.10.)	Celje - Radivoj Korać	69:74

4. round
(13.10.)	Subrina Ilirija - Radivoj Korać	39:65
(14.10.)	Peac-Pecs - Celje	60:52
(14.10.)	Partizan - Vojvodina	81:64
(13.10.)	Mladi Krajišnik - Sloboda	75:50
(13.10.)	Čelik - Voždovac	80:88

5. round
(24.10.)	Voždovac - Vršac	84:60
(20.10.)	Sloboda - Čelik	55:84
(20.10.)	Vojvodina - Mladi Krajišnik	67:63
(9.10.)	Celje - Partizan	52:97
(18.10.)	Radivoj Korać - Peac-Pecs	78:47

6. round
(27.10.)	Subrina Ilirija - Peac-Pecs	64:72
(27.10.)	Partiyan - Radivoj Korać	78:74
(26.10.)	Mladi Krajišnik - Celje	65:57
(27.10.)	Čelik - Vojvodina	68:62
(27.10.)	Vršac - Sloboda	65:70

7. round
(3.11.)	Voždovac - Subrina Ilirija	73:67
(3.11.)	Vojvodina - Vršac	64:50
(6.11.)	Celje - Čelik	56:71
(4.11.)	Radivoj Korać - Mladi Krajišnik	77:61
(3.11.)	Partiyan - Peac-Pecs	89:53

8. round
(4.11.)	Partizan - Subrina Ilirija	110:36
(10.11.)	Mladi Krajišnik - Peac-Pecs	66:72
(10.11.)	Čelik - Radivoj Korać	82:72
(11.11.)	Vršac - Celje	63:64
(10.11.)	Voždovac - Sloboda	69:49

9. round
(17.11.)	Sloboda - Subrina Ilirija	72:69
(17.11.)	Vojvodina - Voždovac	80:67
(16.11.)	Radivoj Korać - Vršac	76:44
(17.11.)	Peav-Pecs - Čelik	59:54
(17.11.)	Partiyan - Mladi Krajišnik	81:66

10. round
(15.12.)	Subrina Ilirija - Mladi Krajišnik	0:20
(24.11.)	Čelik - Partizan	76:80
(20.11.)	Peac-Pecs - Vršac	72:41
(24.11.)	Voždovac - Celje	82:70
(24.11.)	Sloboda - Vojvodina	54:95

11. round
(1.12.)	Vojvodina - Subrina Ilirija	80:45
(1.12.)	Celje - Sloboda	60:67
(30.11.)	Radivoj Korać - Voždovac	80:62
(2.12.)	Partizan - Vršac	97:59
(30.11.)	Mladi Krajišnik - Čelik	20:0

12. round
(8.12.)	Subrina Ilirija - Čelik	0:20
(7.12.)	Mladi Krajišnik - Vršac	101:60
(6.12.)	Peac-Pecs - Voždovac	90:80
(7.12.)	Radivoj Korać - Sloboda	68:62
(8.12.)	Celje - Vojvodina	59:77

13. round
(19.12.)	Celje - Subrina Ilirija	20:0
(14.12.)	Vojvodina - Radivoj Korać	64:62
(12.12.)	Sloboda - Peac-Pecs	80:87
(15.12.)	Voždovac - Partizan	0:20
(15.12.)	Vršac - Čelik	85:81

14. round
(22.12.)	Subrina Ilirija - Vršac	0:20
(22.12.)	Mladi Krajišnik - Voždovac	69:67
(8.12.)	Partizan - Sloboda	86:54
(21.12.)	Peac-Pecs - Vojvodina	81:73
(13.12.)	Radivoj Korać - Celje	80:31

15. round
(9.1.)	Radivoj Korać - Subrina Ilirija	20:0
(9.1.)	Celje - Peac-Pecs	64:70
(9.1.)	Vojvodina - Partizan	66:84
(16.1.)	Sloboda - Mladi Krajišnik	53:51
(9.1.)	Voždovac - Čelik	0:20

16. round
(12.1.)	Vršac - Voždovac	20:0
(12.1.)	Čelik - Sloboda	77:68
(12.1.)	Mladi Krajišnik - Vojvodina	80:85
(12.1.)	Partizan - Celje	94:40
(18.1.)	Peac-Pecs - Radivoj Korać	60:72

17. round
(18.1.)	Peac-Pecs - Subrina Ilirija	20:0
(19.1.)	Radivoj Korać - Partizan	53:88
(19.1.)	Celje - Mladi Krajišnik	45:66
(19.1.)	Vojvodina - Čelik	81:67
(2.2.)	Sloboda - Vršac	77:76

18. round
(26.1.)	Subrina Ilirija - Voždovac	0:20
(26.1.)	Vršac - Vojvodina	102:103
(26.1.)	Čelik - Celje	74:78
(26.1.)	Mladi Krajišnik - Radivoj Korać	67:72
(23.1.)	Peac-Pecs - Partizan	64:76

19. round
(2.2.)	Subrina Ilirija - Partizan	0:20
(30.1.)	Peac-Pecs - Mladi Krajišnik	75:67
(2.2.)	Radivoj Korać - Čelik	65:47
(1.2.)	Celje - Vršac	78:69
(2.2.)	Sloboda - Voždovac	20:0

20. round
(9.2.)	Subrina Ilirija - Sloboda	0:20
(9.2.)	Voždovac - Vojvodina	0:20
(9.2.)	Vršac - Radivoj Korać	60:73
(7.2.)	Čelik - Peac-Pecs	75:60
(6.2.)	Mladi Krajišnik - Partizan	59:78

21. round
(16.2.)	Mladi Krajišnik - Subrina Ilirija	20:0
(14.2.)	Partizan - Čelik	107:51
(27.2.)	Vršac - Peac-Pecs	60:44
(16.2.)	Celje - Voždovac	20:0
(16.2.)	Vojvodina - Sloboda	77:67

22. round
(23.2.)	Subrina Ilirija - Vojvodina	0:20
(20.2.)	Sloboda - Celje	64:71
(23.2.)	Voždovac - Radivoj Korać	0:20
(15.2.)	Vršac - Partizan	46:61
(23.2.)	Čelik - Mladi Krajišnik	63:66

== Final four ==
Final Four to be played from 2–3 March 2013. in the SPC Vojvodina in Novi Sad, Serbia.

club 1	result	club 2
semifinals
(Serbia) Partizan Galenika	94:72	(Serbia) Vojvodina NIS
(Serbia) Radivoj Korać	68:42	(Hungary) Peac-Pécs
for third place
(Hungary) Peac-Pécs	79:74	(Serbia) Vojvodina NIS
final
(Serbia) Partizan Galenika	70:45	(Serbia) Radivoj Korać

2012–13 MŽRKL

Partizan Galenika
2nd Title

== Awards ==
- Player of the Year: Milica Dabović (175-PG-82) of Partizan Galenika (Serbia)
- Guard of the Year: Milica Dabović (175-PG-82) of Partizan Galenika (Serbia)
- Forward of the Year: Sanja Orozović (183-G-90) of Athlete Celje (Slovenia)
- Center of the Year: Amy Jaeschke (196-C-89) of Peac-Pécs (Hungary)
- Defensive Player of the Year: Milica Dabović (175-PG-82) of Partizan Galenika (Serbia)
- Coach of the Year: Marina Maljković of Partizan Galenika (Serbia)

1st Team

- PG: Tamara Radočaj (170-87) of Partizan Galenika (Serbia)
- PG: Milica Dabović (175-82) of Partizan Galenika (Serbia)
- G: Sanja Orozović (183-90) of Athlete Celje (Slovenia)
- C: Amy Jaeschke (196-89) of Peac-Pécs (Hungary)
- PF: Dragana Stanković (193-95) of Sloboda Novi Grad (Bosnia and Herzegovina)

2nd Team

- PG: Popović (173-90) of Vojvodina NIS (Serbia)
- G: Nataša Bučevac (179-85) of Vojvodina NIS (Serbia)
- G: Andrea Barbour (177-89) of Peac-Pécs (Hungary)
- F/C: Tina Jovanović (190-91) of Radivoj Korać (Serbia)
- C: Jelena Velinović (193-81) of Mladi Krajišnik (Bosnia and Herzegovina)

Honorable Mention

- Jelena Antić (187-SF-91) of Partizan Galenika (Serbia)
- Snežana Čolić (178-G-92) of Radivoj Korać (Serbia)
- Nataša Ivančević (188-PF-81) of Vojvodina NIS (Serbia)
- Ivona Bogoje (193-C-76) of Partizan Galenika (Serbia)
- Marica Gajić (187-C-95) of Athlete Celje (Slovenia)
