= Vizura =

Vizura is the name of several sports teams from Belgrade, Serbia:

- OK Vizura, women's volleyball team
- KK Vizura, defunct men's basketball team (2003–2009)
- KK Mega Vizura, a former name of men's basketball team now known as KK Mega Basket
- Vizura Sports Center, basketball hall in Belgrade
