= Bojan Jovičić =

Serbian basketball player and coach

Tamiš
- Title: Head coach
- League: Basketball League of Serbia

Personal information
- Born: July 6, 1977 (age 49) Pančevo, SR Serbia, SFR Yugoslavia
- Listed height: 1.84 m (6 ft 0 in)

Career information
- NBA draft: 1999: undrafted
- Playing career: 1994–2009
- Position: Point guard
- Number: 10
- Coaching career: 2009–present

Career history

Coaching
- 2009–present: Tamiš

Bojan Jovičić (Serbian Cyrillic: Бојан Јовичић; born July 6, 1977) is a Serbian professional basketball coach and former player who is the head coach for Tamiš of the Basketball League of Serbia.

== Playing career ==
Jovičić played for Serbian teams Profikolor, Dinamo Pančevo, Agropan, Jedinstvo Novi Bečej, OKK Beograd (2001–2002), Avala Ada and Tamiš (2005–2009). He also played for Montenegrin team Tina Time based in Bar.

== Coaching career ==
Jovičić became a head coach for Tamiš in 2008–09 season after Dragan Nikolić got fired.

== Personal life ==
His brother Darko is a basketball executive and former coach.
