= 2019 Basketball League of Serbia playoffs =

Tournament details
- Country: Serbia
- Dates: 2–20 June 2019
- Season: 2018–19
- Teams: 4
- Defending champions: Crvena zvezda mts

Final positions
- Champions: Crvena zvezda mts (20th title)
- Runner-up: Partizan NIS
- Semifinalists: FMP; Mega Bemax

Awards
- Best player: (United States) Billy Baron

The 2019 Basketball League of Serbia playoffs is the play-off tournament that decides the winner of the 2018–19 Basketball League of Serbia season. The playoffs is scheduled to start on 2 June and end on 20 June 2019.

== Qualified teams ==
Pos.	Super League Group A	Super League Group B
1	Crvena zvezda mts	Partizan NIS
2	FMP	Mega Bemax

== Bracket ==
Semifinals
2–4 June
Crvena zvezda mts	2
Mega Bemax	0
3–7 June
Partizan NIS	2
FMP	1

Finals
10–17 June
Crvena zvezda mts	3
Partizan NIS	1

== Semifinals ==
Team 1	Series	Team 2	Game 1	Game 2	Game 3
Crvena zvezda mts	2–0	Mega Bemax	83–72	96–91	—
Partizan NIS	2–1	FMP	93–75	85–88	97–59

=== Crvena zvezda mts v Mega Bemax ===
2 June Game 1	Crvena zvezda mts	83–72 (Series: 1–0)	Mega Bemax	Belgrade
19:00	Scoring by quarter: 12–17, 26–23, 20–17, 25–17
Arena Sport	Pts: Baron 24; Rebs: Faye 9 Asts: three players 3 PIR: Čović 18	Boxscore	Pts: Ašćerić 20; Rebs: Bitadze 8 Asts: Bitadze, Atić 6 PIR: Atić 18	Arena: Aleksandar Nikolić Hall; Attendance: 1,976; Referees: Milija Vojinović, Aleksandar Glišić, Saša Maričić

4 June Game 2	Mega Bemax	91–96 (Series: 0–2)	Crvena zvezda mts	Belgrade
19:00	Scoring by quarter: 25–24, 25–25, 22–24, 19–23
Arena Sport	Pts: Ašćerić 20; Rebs: Fundić, Atić 7 Asts: Atić 9 PIR: Atić 27	Boxscore	Pts: Rivers 29; Rebs: Ojo 6 Asts: Čović 4 PIR: Rivers 24	Arena: Mega Factory; Attendance: 500; Referees: Ilija Belošević, Uroš Obrknežević, Siniša Prpa

=== Partizan NIS v FMP ===
3 June Game 1	Partizan NIS	93–75 (Series: 1–0)	FMP	Belgrade
18:00	Scoring by quarter: 21–16, 27–21, 23–24, 22–14
Arena Sport	Pts: Gagić 18; Rebs: Gagić 10; Asts: Renfroe 7 PIR: Veličković 23	Boxscore	Pts: Đorđević 18; Rebs: Đorđević 7 Asts: Pot, Uskoković 4 PIR: Đorđević 20	Arena: Aleksandar Nikolić Hall; Attendance: 3,700; Referees: Ilija Belošević, Marko Juras, Vladimir Jevtović

5 June Game 2	FMP	88–85 (Series: 1–1)	Partizan NIS	Belgrade
19:00	Scoring by quarter: 19–22, 18–23, 26–15, 25–25
Arena Sport	Pts: Uskoković, Đorđević 18; Rebs: Đorđević 7 Asts: Pot 8 PIR: Pot 22	Boxscore	Pts: Marinković 19; Rebs: N. Janković, Paige 6 Asts: Paige, Renfroe 5 PIR: Marinković, N. Janković 15	Arena: Železnik Hall; Attendance: 450; Referees: Milivoje Jovčić, Uroš Nikolić, Nemanja Ninković

7 June Game 3	Partizan NIS	97–59 (Series: 2–1)	FMP	Belgrade
19:00	Scoring by quarter: 21–12, 31–16, 22–17, 23–14
Arena Sport	Pts: S. Janković 21; Rebs: S. Janković 13; Asts: Zagorac 9 PIR: S. Janković 32	Boxscore	Pts: Đorđević 19; Rebs: Momirov 5 Asts: Pot 3 PIR: Đorđević 17	Arena: Aleksandar Nikolić Hall; Attendance: 3,500; Referees: Ilija Belošević, Uroš Obrknežević, Aleksandar Glišić

== Finals ==
Team 1	Series	Team 2	Game 1	Game 2	Game 3	Game 4	Game 5
Crvena zvezda mts	3–1	Partizan NIS	98–94	72–73	96–90	76–75	—

=== Game 1 ===
10 June	Crvena zvezda mts	98–94 (Series: 1–0)	Partizan NIS	Belgrade
18:00	Scoring by quarter: 30–22, 18–18, 25–28, 25–26
Arena Sport	Pts: Davidovac 20; Rebs: Ojo 8 Asts: Čović 5 PIR: Čović 28	Boxscore	Pts: Renfroe 20; Rebs: Janković 7 Asts: Jaramaz, Renfroe 4 PIR: Renfroe 24	Arena: Aleksandar Nikolić Hall; Attendance: 5,231; Referees: Milivoje Jovčić, Aleksandar Glišić, Vladimir Jevtović

=== Game 2 ===
12 June	Partizan NIS	73–72 (Series: 1–1)	Crvena zvezda mts	Belgrade
19:00	Scoring by quarter: 17–9, 19–20, 13–24, 24–19
Arena Sport	Pts: Paige 19; Rebs: N. Janković 10; Asts: Renfroe 3 PIR: N. Janković 19	Boxscore	Pts: Faye 14; Rebs: Ojo 7 Asts: Baron 7 PIR: Faye 18	Arena: Aleksandar Nikolić Hall; Attendance: 6,500; Referees: Ilija Belošević, Marko Juras, Uroš Obrknežević

=== Game 3 ===
15 June	Crvena zvezda mts	96–90 (Series: 2–1)	Partizan NIS	Belgrade
18:00	Scoring by quarter: 22–18, 26–27, 20–19, 28–26
Arena Sport	Pts: Baron 25; Rebs: Faye 9 Asts: Čović 8 PIR: Baron 28	Boxscore	Pts: Marinković 21; Rebs: Renfroe 6 Asts: Renfroe 8 PIR: Renfroe 35	Arena: Aleksandar Nikolić Hall; Attendance: 5,634; Referees: Milivoje Jovčić, Marko Juras, Uroš Nikolić

=== Game 4 ===
17 June	Partizan NIS	75–76 (Series: 1–3)	Crvena zvezda mts	Belgrade
18:00	Scoring by quarter: 23–16, 19–18, 10–18, 23–24
Arena Sport	Pts: Gagić, Renfroe 11; Rebs: Veličković 7 Asts: Renfroe 4 PIR: Jaramaz 13	Boxscore	Pts: Baron 21; Rebs: Ojo 7 Asts: Čović 7 PIR: Baron 19	Arena: Aleksandar Nikolić Hall; Attendance: 6,500; Referees: Ilija Belošević, Uroš Obrknežević, Uroš Nikolić

== See also ==
- List of current Basketball League of Serbia team rosters
- 2019 ABA League First Division Playoffs

Teams

- 2018–19 KK Crvena zvezda season
- 2018–19 KK Partizan season
