= Preković =

Preković (Serbian Cyrillic: Прековић) is a Serbian surname. Notable people with the surname include:

- Milan Preković (born 1973), Serbian former basketball player
- Miloje Preković (born 1991), Serbian footballer
