= Rvački Klub Partizan =

- Founded: 1948
- Colors

Rvački Klub Partizan is a wrestling club from Belgrade, Serbia. The club is part of the sports society JSD Partizan.

== History ==
The club was founded in 1948. It won 10 Yugoslavian championships. Later on the club had some difficulty but in the late 2000s (decade) it emerged as a power once again. It was second place in Serbia in 2007. Its success was only getting started. Winning two national championships in a row, in 2008 and 2009, the club went forward to win the European championship in 2009 despite financial difficulties.

== Honours ==
- European Champions Cup
  - Winners (1): 2009.
- European CELA Cup
  - Winners (1): 2010.
- National Championships
  - Winners (10): 1951, 1953, 1954, 1955, 1956, 1957, 1959, 1992, 2008, 2009.
- National Cups
  - Winners (14): 1953, 1954, 1955, 1998, 2002, 2004, 2005, 2006, 2010, 2011, 2012, 2013, 2019, 2021.
- National Supercups
  - Winners (2): 2002, 2006.

More achievements can be seen on the club's official website here.
