= Partizan (rural locality) =

Partizan (Russian: Партиза́н) is the name of several rural localities in Russia:

- Partizan, Krasnodar Krai, a khutor in Skobelevsky Stanitsa Okrug of Gulkevichsky District in Krasnodar Krai; 45°15′N 40°25′E
- Partizan, Ussuriysk, Primorsky Krai, a settlement under the administrative jurisdiction of Ussuriysk City Under Krai Jurisdiction in Primorsky Krai
- Partizan, Partizansky District, Primorsky Krai, a settlement in Partizansky District of Primorsky Krai
- Partizan, Rostov Oblast, a khutor in Kirovskoye Rural Settlement of Tselinsky District in Rostov Oblast
- Partizan, Sakha Republic, a selo in Partizansky Rural Okrug of Namsky District in the Sakha Republic
- Partizan, Tula Oblast, a settlement in Partizanskaya Rural Administration of Uzlovsky District in Tula Oblast
- Partizan, Tyumen Oblast, a settlement in Partizansky Rural Okrug of Abatsky District in Tyumen Oblast
- Partizan, Voronezh Oblast, a settlement in Oktyabrskoye Rural Settlement of Paninsky District in Voronezh Oblast
