= Partizani =

Partizani may refer to:

- Partizani ^{[ro]}, a village in Maliuc Commune, Tulcea County, Romania
- Partizani, Varna Province, a village in Dalgopol Municipality, Varna Province, Bulgaria
- Partizani, the old name for Darosava, a village in Aranđelovac Municipality, Šumadija District, Serbia
- Partizani (″Partisans″), Serbo-Croatian title of the 1974 Yugoslav film Hell River
- FK Partizani Tirana, football club from Tirana, Albania
- Yugoslav Partisans, a World War II resistance movement, known in Serbo-Croatian as Partizani (″Partisans″)

== See also ==
- Partizan (disambiguation)
- Partisan (disambiguation)
