= KK Radnik Bijeljina =

Basketball club in Bijeljina, Bosnia and Herzegovina

KK Radnik BNB
- Leagues: First League of R Srpska
- Founded: 20 May 1961; 65 years ago
- History: OKK Bijeljina; 1961–N/A; KK Radnik; N/A–present
- Capacity: 1,000
- Location: Bijeljina, Bosnia and Herzegovina
- Team colors: Blue and white
- President: Mladen Petrović
- Head coach: Vladimir Radovanović
- Championships: 4 R Srpska League
- Website: www.kkradnik.online

Košarkaški klub Radnik (Serbian Cyrillic: Кошаркашки клуб Радник, transl. Radnik Basketball Club), currently known as Radnik Elvaco MetPro due to sponsorship reasons, is a men's professional basketball club based in Bijeljina, Republika Srpska, Bosnia and Herzegovina. They are currently competing in the First League of R Srpska.

== History ==
The club is formed on 20 May 1961 as OKK Bijeljina and renamed as KK Radnik later.

== Sponsorship naming ==
The club has had several denominations through the years due to its sponsorship:

- Radnik BNB (2014–2019)
- Radnik Elvaco MetPro (2019–present)

== Head coaches ==
- (Socialist Federal Republic of Yugoslavia) Ružda Trhulj (1962–N/A)
- (Bosnia and Herzegovina) Zoran Andrić (2006–2007)
- (Bosnia and Herzegovina) Igor Mihajlović (2008–2011)
- (Serbia) Predrag Jaćimović (2011–2013)
- (Bosnia and Herzegovina) Bogdan Stanojević (2013–2014)
- (Bosnia and Herzegovina) Igor Mihajlović (2014–2015)
- (Serbia) Branislav Vićentić (2015–2018)
- (Bosnia and Herzegovina) Vladimir Radovanović (2018–present)

== Trophies and awards ==
- First League of Republika Srpska (2nd-tier)
  - Winners (4): 2003–04, 2011–12, 2014–15, 2016–17

== Notable former players ==
- (Socialist Federal Republic of Yugoslavia) Nihad Izić
- (Socialist Federal Republic of Yugoslavia) Slobodan Popović
- (Socialist Federal Republic of Yugoslavia) Dragiša Šarić
