= Milan Preković =

Serbian basketball player (born 1973)

Personal information
- Born: April 6, 1973 (age 53) Belgrade, SFR Yugoslavia
- Listed height: 1.96 m (6 ft 5 in)

Career information
- Playing career: 1992–2010
- Position: Small forward / shooting guard

Career history
- 1992–1994: Profikolor
- 1996–1998: Beobanka
- 1998–2000: Beopetrol
- 2000–2001: Crvena zvezda
- 2001–2002: CSK VVS Samara
- 2002: BC Ural Yekaterinburg
- 2002–2003: Geoplin Slovan
- 2003–2004: Mašinac
- 2004–2005: ABC Amsterdam
- 2005: BC Nikšić
- 2005–2006: Atlas Banka
- 2006–2007: Ušće Vizura
- 2007–2009: Feni Industries
- 2009–2010: Slavija Istočno Sarajevo

Milan Preković (born April 6, 1973) is a former Serbian professional basketball player.
