= 2013–14 MŽRKL =

- League: Adriatic League
- Sport: Basketball
- Duration: 9 October 2013 – 8 March 2014
- Games: 73
- Teams: 12
- TV partner: (Montenegro) RTCG

2013–14
- Season champions: (Serbia) Radivoj Korać (1st title)
- Season MVP: (United States) Tavelyn James

WABA League seasons
- ← 2012–13 2014–15 →

MŽRKL League for the season 2013–14 was the Thirteenth season of the Adriatic League. Competition included twelve teams from five countries, a champion for the first time in team history became the Radivoj Korać. In this season participating clubs from Serbia, Montenegro, Bosnia and Herzegovina, Croatia and from Slovenia.

MŽRKL League for the season 2013–14 has begun to play 9 October 2013. and ended on 26 February 2014, when he it was completed a Quarterfinals. Final Four to be played from 7–8 March 2014. in Podgorica, Montenegro. Winner Final Four this season for the team Radivoj Korać from Serbia.

As a Cadet MŽRKL League last season a success, the Board of league decided to continue playing Cadet MŽRKL League. Cadet MŽRKL League comprises 9 teams, where each team plays each at once. One team is organizing a mini tournament where four teams play two rounds of the league for a weekend and so once a month. Top 4 teams qualify for the Final Four to be played in the same place for seniors and the same weekend play. Winner Final Four this season for the second time in team history became the team Trešnjevka 2009 from Croatia.

== Team information ==
Country	Teams	Team	City	Venue (Capacity)
Serbia	5			
Serbia	5	Partizan	Belgrade	Belgrade Sport Palace (5,000)
Serbia	5	Radivoj Korać	Belgrade	Sport EKO Hall (1,000)
Serbia	5	Vojvodina	Novi Sad	SPC Vojvodina (1,030)
Serbia	5	Crvena zvezda	Belgrade	Basket City Hall (1,600)
Serbia	5	Srbobran	Srbobran	SC Srbobran (500)
Slovenia	3			
Slovenia	3	Athlete Celje	Celje	Dvorana Gimnazije Celje - Center (1,500)
Slovenia	3	Grosuplje	Grosuplje	ŠD Brinje (600)
Slovenia	3	Triglav Kranj	Kranj	Športna dvorana Planina (800)
Bosnia and Herzegovina	2			
Bosnia and Herzegovina	2	Čelik	Zenica	Arena Zenica (6,200)
Bosnia and Herzegovina	2	Play Off	Sarajevo	Sport Hall Sarajevo (800)
Montenegro	1	Budućnost Volcano	Podgorica	Morača Sports Center (4,570)
Croatia	1	Medveščak	Zagreb	ŠD Peščenica (600)

== Regular season ==
In the Regular season was played with 12 teams divided into 2 groups of 6 teams and play a dual circuit system, each with one game each at home and away. The four best teams in each group at the end of the regular season were placed in the Quarterfinals. The regular season began on 9 October 2013. and it will end on 6 February 2014.

=== Group A ===
Place	Team	Pld	W	L	PF	PA	Diff	Pts	
1.	(Serbia) Partizan	10	8	2	807	694	+113	16	Quarterfinals
2.	(Slovenia) Triglav Kranj	10	7	3	687	622	+65	17	Quarterfinals
3.	(Serbia) Srbobran	10	6	4	664	621	+43	16	Quarterfinals
4.	(Croatia) Medveščak	10	6	4	675	617	+58	16	Quarterfinals
5.	(Slovenia) Grosuplje	10	3	7	567	620	-53	13	
6.	(Serbia) Vojvodina	10	0	10	534	760	-226	10	

1. round
(9.10.)	Partizan - Medveščak	86:65
(1.11.)	Vojvodina - Grosuplje	35:61
(10.10)	Triglav - Srbobran	61:60

2. round
(16.10.)	Medveščak - Srbobran	56:57
(17.10.)	Grosuplje - Triglav	59:54
(16.10.)	Partizan - Vojvodina	108:52

3. round
(30.10.)	Vojvodina - Medveščak	33:69
(31.10.)	Triglav - Partizan	83:70
(30.10.)	Srbobran - Grosuplje	67:57

4. round
(13.11.)	Medveščak - Grosuplje	68:52
(13.11.)	Partizan - Srbobran	82:77
(13.11.)	Vojvodina - Triglav	65:73

5. round
(28.11.)	Triglav - Medveščak	66:76
(27.11.)	Srbobran - Vojvodina	71:60
(28.11.)	Grosuplje - Partizan	63:77

6. round
(4.12.)	Medveščak - Partizan	77:66
(5.12.)	Grosuplje - Vojvodina	60:58
(4.12.)	Srbobran - Triglav	61:68

7. round
(18.12.)	Srbobran - Medveščak	65:61
(18.12.)	Triglav - Grosuplje	52:34
(18.12.)	Vojvodina - Partizan	68:73

8. round
(15.1.)	Medveščak - Vojvodina	79:61
(15.1.)	Partizan - Triglav	90:67
(15.1.)	Grosuplje - Srbobran	52:59

9. round
(29.1.)	Grosuplje - Medveščak	59:68
(29.1.)	Srbobran - Partizan	72:73
(29.1.)	Triglav - Vojvodina	91:51

10. round
(6.2.)	Medveščak - Triglav	56:72
(6.2.)	Vojvodina - Srbobran	51:75
(6.2.)	Partizan - Grosuplje	82:70

=== Group B ===
Place	Team	Pld	W	L	PF	PA	Diff	Pts	
1.	(Slovenia) Athlete Celje	10	8	2	762	714	+48	18	Quarterfinals
2.	(Serbia) Radivoj Korać	10	6	4	728	712	+16	16	Quarterfinals
3.	(Serbia) Crvena zvezda	10	5	5	767	736	+31	15	Quarterfinals
4.	(Montenegro) Budućnost Volcano	10	5	5	783	727	+56	15	Quarterfinals
5.	(Bosnia and Herzegovina) Čelik Zenica	10	3	7	669	721	-52	13	
6.	(Bosnia and Herzegovina) Play Off Sarejevo	10	3	7	775	874	-99	13	

1. round
(9.10.)	Radivoj Korać - Budućnost	77:73
(10.10)	Crvena Zvezda - Play Off	80:82
(10.10)	Athlete Celje - Čelik	67:65

2. round
(17.10.)	Budućnost - Čelik	75:44
(17.10.)	Play Off - Athlete Celje	85:95
(16.10.)	Radivoj Korać - Crvena Zvezda	57:67

3. round
(31.10.)	Crvena Zvezda - Budućnost	86:82
(31.10.)	Athlete Celje - Radivoj Korać	81:59
(27.10.)	Čelik - Play Off	88:72

4. round
(14.11.)	Budućnost - Play Off	103:96
(13.11.)	Radivoj Korać - Čelik	77:65
(13.11.)	Crvena Zvezda - Athlete Celje	70:85

5. round
(28.11.)	Athlete Celje - Budućnost	81:79
(28.11.)	Čelik - Crvena Zvezda	79:77
(28.11.)	Play Off - Radivoj Korać	90:78

6. round
(5.12.)	Budućnost - Radivoj Korać	59:69
(4.12.)	Play Off - Crvena Zvezda	84:86
(5.12.)	Čelik - Athlete Celje	71:57

7. round
(19.12.)	Čelik - Budućnost	68:74
(19.12.)	Athlete Celje - Play Off	83:67
(19.12.)	Crvena Zvezda - Radivoj Korać	81:67

8. round
(15.1.)	Budućnost - Crvena Zvezda	64:61
(15.1.)	Radivoj Korać - Athlete Celje	78:68
(15.1.)	Play Off - Čelik	64:60

9. round
(30.1.)	Play Off - Budućnost	77:109
(30.1.)	Čelik - Radivoj Korać	70:74
(30.1.)	Athlete Celje - Crvena Zvezda	77:75

10. round
(6.2.)	Budućnost - Athlete Celje	65:68
(6.2.)	Crvena Zvezda - Čelik	84:59
(6.2.)	Radivoj Korać - Play Off	92:58

== Quarterfinals ==
In the quarterfinals, teams play until one team arrives first to 2 wins. The winners were placed on the Final Four. The quarterfinals began on 12 February 2014. and it will end on 27 February 2014.

club 1	result	club 2
Quarterfinals
(Serbia) Partizan	1:2	(Montenegro) Budućnost Volcano
(Slovenia) Triglav Kranj	0:2	(Serbia) Crvena zvezda
(Serbia) Radivoj Korać	2:0	(Serbia) Srbobran
(Slovenia) Athlete Celje	2:0	(Croatia) Medveščak

1. leg
(13.2.)	Partizan – Budućnost	81:79
(13.2.)	Triglav – Crvena zvezda	66:81
(12.2.)	Radivoj Korać – Srbobran	81:37
(13.2.)	Athlete Celje – Medvešćak	82:56

2. leg
(20.2.)	Budućnost – Partizan	71:49
(20.2.)	Crvena zvezda – Triglav	98:68
(19.2.)	Srbobran – Radivoj Korać	52:63
(19.2.)	Medvešćak – Athlete Celje	60:64

3. leg
(26.2.)	Partizan – Budućnost	59:64

== Final four ==
Final Four to be played from 7–8 March 2014. in the Morača Sports Center in Podgorica, Montenegro.

club 1	result	club 2
semifinals
(Slovenia) Athlete Celje	49:60	(Serbia) Crvena zvezda
(Montenegro) Budućnost Volcano	45:59	(Serbia) Radivoj Korać
for third place
(Montenegro) Budućnost Volcano	50:57	(Slovenia) Athlete Celje
final
(Serbia) Crvena zvezda	83:87	(Serbia) Radivoj Korać

2013–14 MŽRKL

Radivoj Korać
1st Title

== Awards ==
- Player of the Year: Tavelyn James (170-PG-90) of Athlete Celje (Slovenia)
- Guard of the Year: Tavelyn James (170-PG-90) of Athlete Celje (Slovenia)
- Forward of the Year: Aleksandra Crvendakić (188-F-96) of Crvena zvezda (Serbia)
- Center of the Year: Marica Gajić (187-C-95) of Athlete Celje (Slovenia)
- Defensive Player of the Year: Haleigh Lankster (175-G-89) of Budućnost Volcano (Montenegro)
- Coach of the Year: Miloš Pavlović of Radivoj Korać (Serbia)

1st Team

- PG: Aleksandra Stanaćev (167-PG-94) of Crvena zvezda (Serbia)
- PG: Tavelyn James (170-PG-90) of Athlete Celje (Slovenia)
- F: Aleksandra Crvendakić (188-F-96) (183–90) of Crvena zvezda (Serbia)
- PF: Marica Gajić (187-C-95) of Athlete Celje (Slovenia)
- C: Tina Jovanović (190-F/C-91) of Crvena zvezda (Serbia)

2nd Team

- PG: Milica Deura (178-G-94) of Crvena zvezda (Serbia)
- G: Sanja Mandić (178-SG-85) of Radivoj Korać (Serbia)
- GF: Jelena Vučetić (178-G-93) of Partizan (Serbia)
- F: Haleigh Lankster (175-G-89) of Budućnost Volcano (Montenegro)
- C: Ana Radović (190-C-90) of Budućnost Volcano (Montenegro)

Honorable Mention

- Eva Lisec (192-C-95) of Athlete Celje (Slovenia)
- Ivanka Matić (193-C/F-79) of Crvena zvezda (Serbia)
- Tina Jakovina (183-F-92) of Triglav Kranj (Slovenia)
- Nina Premasunac (186-F-92) of Medveščak (Croatia)
- Monet Johnson (186-F-87) of Play Off Sarejevo (Bosnia and Herzegovina)
- Aida Kalušić (190-C-87) of Čelik Zenica (Bosnia and Herzegovina)
- Zvjezdana Gagić (170-PG-81) of Čelik Zenica (Bosnia and Herzegovina)
