= Karate Klub Partizan =

- Colors
- President: Milorad Mićo Pušica
- Head coach: Milos Zivkovic and Aleksandra Lazic
- Manager: Goran Comagic
- Website: http://www.karateklubpartizan.org/

Karate Klub Partizan is a karate club from Belgrade, Serbia. The club is part of the sports society JSD Partizan.

There are two main trainers for the club - Milos Zivkovic and Aleksandra Lazic .

The club in Belgrade trains at the Partizan Stadium. The leader of the Serbian Political Party Srpsko Jedinstvo used to train in Karate Klub Partizan.

== Brief history ==
Karate started to develop in the former Yugoslavia in the 1960s. Some of the first sensei's from Japan to come over were Nagaoka Skokiči and Tecuji Murakami. Karate Klub Partizan was among the first Karate Clubs that were formed in the former Yugoslavia. Initially being together with the Judo federation, Karate separated into its own federation in 1969. The main style of Karate that was trained was Shotokan, while Vadorju was also present in a few clubs.

== Honours ==
=== Men ===
- Championship of Serbia
  - Winners (1) : 2012
- European Championship
  - Winners (2) : 2000, 2001
  - Runners-up (1) : 2002

=== Women ===
- Championship of Yugoslavia
  - Winners (4)
- Championship of Serbia
  - Winners (2) : 2011, 2018
