= Nebojša Vidić =

Serbian basketball player and coach

Tauron GTK Gliwice
- Title: Head coach
- League: Polish Basketball League

Personal information
- Born: 29 January 1973 (age 53) Pančevo, SR Serbia, Yugoslavia

Career information
- NBA draft: 1995: undrafted
- Playing career: 1991–2013
- Position: Guard
- Coaching career: 1995–present

Career history

Coaching
- 2003–2005: Tamiš
- Sveti Đorđe
- 2011–2012: Þór Akureyri
- 2013–2014: Lokomotiv-Kuban 2
- Krasny Oktyabr (assistant)
- 2016–2019: Balkan Botevgrad
- 2019–2020: Nizhny Novgorod (assistant)
- 2021: Tamiš
- 2021: Pelister
- 2021–2022: Balkan Botevgrad
- 2022: Avtodor
- 2023: Fc Arges Pitesti
- 2026–present: GTK Gliwice

Nebojša Vidić (Serbian Cyrillic: Небојша Видић; born 29 January 1973) is a Serbian professional basketball coach and former player. He is the current head coach GTK Gliwice of the Polish Basketball League (PLK).

== Playing career ==
As a guard, Vidić played for his hometown clubs Tamiš and Rolling-Hunter.

== Coaching career ==
Vidić started his coaching career at 22, while he was still an active player. He was a head coach for Tamiš and Sveti Đorđe during the 2000s.

In the 2011–12 season, Vidić was the head coach for Þór Akureyri of the Icelandic Premier League. In the 2013–14 season, Vidić was the head coach for Lokomotiv-Kuban 2 of the VTB United Youth League.

In February 2016, Bulgarian club Balkan Botevgrad hired Vidić as their new head coach. In June 2016, he signed with Balkan for the 2016–17 season. In May 2017, he signed with Balkan for one more season. Following a 3–1 win over Levski Lukoil in the 2019 Finals, Vidić won a Bulgarian National League for the 2018–19 season with Balkan. It was their first national title in 30 years. In May 2019, he left Balkan Botevgrad.

Prior to the 2019–20 season, Vidić became an assistant coach for Nizhny Novgorod under Zoran Lukić. On 10 March 2021, Tamiš hired him as their new head coach.

On January 10, 2026, he signed with GTK Gliwice of the Polish Basketball League (PLK).

== Career achievements ==
- Bulgarian National League champion: 2 (with Balkan Botevgrad: 2018–19, 2021–22)
