= Borislav Ćorković =

Serbian basketball player and coach

Personal information
- Born: 9 January 1933 Dvor na Uni, Sava Banovina, Kingdom of Yugoslavia
- Died: 26 January 2006 (aged 73) Belgrade, Serbia and Montenegro

Career information
- Playing career: 1952–1958
- Coaching career: 1958–1993

Career history

Playing
- 1952–1958: Dinamo Pančevo

Coaching
- 1958–1960: Železničar Belgrade
- 1960–1965: OKK Belgrade (youth)
- 1965–1970: Partizan Women
- 1970–1972: Kuwait (assistant)
- 1974–1976: Partizan
- 1976–1979: Yugoslavia Women
- 1977–1978: Dinamo Pančevo
- 1980–1982: Partizan
- 1984–1987: Kuwait
- 1989–1990: Partizan
Medals
Women's basketball
Head coach for Yugoslavia
FIBA EuroBasket Women
Silver medal – second place	1978 Poland	Team
Balkan Games Women
Gold medal – first place	1977 Turkey	Team
Bronze medal – third place	1978 Greece	Team

Borislav "Reba" Ćorković (Serbian Cyrillic: Борислав Ћорковић; 9 January 1933 – 26 January 2006) was a Serbian professional basketball player and coach.

== Playing career ==
During the 1950s, Ćorković played basketball for Dinamo Pančevo of the Yugoslav League.

== Coaching career ==
In 1958, Ćorković began with coaching career with Železničar Belgrade. From 1960 to 1965, he coached young teams, mostly women, in OKK Belgrade. In 1965, he became a head coach for Partizan women's team, also coached the junior men's team also. In 1974, he joined Partizan men's team. He led Partizan as a head coach for five seasons (1974–75, 1975–76, 1980–81, 1981–82, 1989–90) in three stints. He won two national championships with them. In the late 1990s and during the 2000s, he worked as an advisor for Partizan's youth selections.

As a head coach for the Yugoslavia women's national team, he won the gold medal at the 1977 Balkan Games in Ankara, Turkey, and the bronze medal at the 1978 Games in Thessaloniki. Also, he won the silver medal at the 1978 European Championship for Women in Poznań with 7–2 record. He loses to the Soviet Union and Poland).

== Career achievements ==
As head coach:

- Slobodan Piva Ivković Award for Lifetime Achievement (2007)
- Yugoslav League champion: 2 (with Partizan: 1975–76, 1980–81)

also

- FIBA European Champions Cup – top 6 (with Partizan: 1981–82)
- FIBA European Cup Winners' Cup – quarterfinalist (with Partizan: 1989–90)
- FIBA Korać Cup – semifinalist (with Partizan: 1974–75)
