= Todor Lazić =

Serbian basketball coach

Personal information
- Born: 30 August 1930 Belgrade, Yugoslavia
- Died: 19 July 2000 (aged 69) Belgrade, Serbia, FR Yugoslavia
- Coaching career: 1959–1983

Career history

Coaching
- 1959–1961: Dinamo Pančevo
- 1961–1964: OKK Beograd (assistant)
- 1964–1967: Dinamo Pančevo
- 1967–1968: OKK Beograd
- 1969–1972: Pallacanestro Chieti
- 1972–1975: OKK Beograd
- 1975–1976: Zastava Kragujevac
- 1976–1977: FC Barcelona
- 1977–1978: Partizan (youth)
- 1978–1980: Dinamo Pančevo
- 1980–1982: Dinamo Pančevo Women
- 1982: Feiraco Obradoiro
- 1983: Dinamo Pančevo Women

Todor Lazić (Serbian Cyrillic: Тодор Лазић; 30 August 1930 – 19 July 2000) was a Serbian basketball coach.
