= Olympiacos Wrestling =

Greek wrestling club

Olympiacos CFP
- Nicknames: Thrylos (The Legend); Erythrolefkoi (The Red-Whites)
- Founded: 1934 (1961 reorganized)
- Dissolved: 2014
- Based in: Piraeus, Greece
- Colours: Red, White
- Championships: 1 CELA Cup; 2 Greek Championships
- Website: olympiacossfp.gr

Olympiacos Wrestling department was initially founded in 1934 and then reorganized in 1961. It was the first section in individual sports in Greece to win a European title, the CELA Cup in 2006. The most important athletes in the history of the department were the Koutsioumpas brothers, the Athens' Olympic Bronze Medalist Artiom Kiouregkian, and Christos Gikas amongst many others.

== Honours ==
=== European Competitions ===
- CELA Cup
  - Winners (1) (record): 2006

=== Domestic Competitions ===
- Greek Championship
  - Winners (2): 1976, 2006

== European Honours ==
year	honour	notes
European Champion Clubs' Cup
2006	5th place	
CELA Cup
2006	Winners	
