= FK Partizan (disambiguation) =

FK Partizan is a football club in Belgrade, Serbia

FK Partizan may also refer to:

- FK Partizan Bumbarevo Brdo
- FK Partizan Kosovska Mitrovica

== See also ==
- Partizan (disambiguation)
- FK Partizani Tirana
- FC Partizan (disambiguation)
- NK Partizan (disambiguation)
- TJ Partizán Domaniža
- Partizán Bardejov
