= JSD Partizan =

Multi-sport club in Belgrade, Serbia

- Nicknames: Crno-beli (The Black-Whites); Parni valjak (The Steamroller)
- Founded: 4 October 1945; 81 years ago
- Based in: Belgrade, Serbia
- Stadium: Partizan Stadium
- Colours: Black and white
- Anthem: Himna Partizana; Da volim crno-bele
- President: Željko Tanasković
- Club titles: European Titles: 22; Regional Titles: 24
- Supporters: Grobari (The Gravediggers)
- Website: partizanjsd.rs

Jugoslovensko sportsko društvo Partizan (Serbian Cyrillic: Југословенско спортско друштво Партизан, lit. 'Yugoslav Sports Society Partizan'), commonly abbreviated as JSD Partizan (Serbian Cyrillic: ЈСД Партизан), is a multi-sport club from Belgrade, Serbia. Founded on 4 October 1945, it is an umbrella organization featuring 32 clubs in 26 different sports. JSD Partizan's clubs have won 871 trophies, including 19 European trophies, 28 Regional trophies, 571 National Leagues, 228 National Cups, 17 National Super Cups and 8 Winter championships. JSD Partizan's athletes have won 76 Olympic medals, including 26 gold, 33 silver and 17 bronze medals.

== History ==
Founded on 4 October 1945, in Belgrade (Yugoslavia) under the name Fiskulturno društvo Centralnog doma Jugoslovenske armije Partizan (roughly translated to English as Sport Society of the Central House of the Yugoslav Army Partizan).

Among the first teams at the club were soccer and athletics. By 1946 there were also basketball, chess, volleyball, tennis, and swimming teams. The next year, 1947, some more sections were founded: biking, boxing, hockey, table tennis, and motorcycling. And later some more – wrestling, judo, weight lifting, waterpolo, shooting, bowling, rowing, jumping in water, and handball.

The club's official name was changed in 1950.

== Crest and colors ==
1945–1947

1958–present

Golden version

== Honours and achievements ==
=== Athletics ===
==== Men ====
- National Championships
  - Winners (25): 1947, 1948, 1949, 1950, 1951, 1952, 1956, 1957, 1958, 1959, 1960, 1961, 1962, 1963, 1964, 1966, 1984, 1991, 1996, 1997, 1998, 1999, 2000, 2001, 2012
- National Cups
  - Winners (10): 1948, 1949, 1965, 1991, 1996, 1997, 1998, 1999, 2000, 2001
- National Championships – cross country running
  - Winners (21): 1946, 1947, 1948, 1949, 1950, 1951, 1952, 1953, 1954, 1955, 1957, 1958, 1961, 1963, 1965, 1967, 1968, 1969, 1974, 1996, 2018
- National Championships – cross country short track running
  - Winners (12): 1947, 1949, 1950, 1951, 1952, 1953, 1954, 1955, 1957, 1958, 1960, 1961
- National Championships – "Partizan's March"
  - Winners (9): 1957, 1958, 1960, 1962, 1963, 1964, 1965, 1968, 1973

==== Women ====
- National Championships
  - Winners (11): 1974, 1975, 1978, 1979, 1980, 1991, 1996, 1997, 1998, 1999, 2001
- National Cups
  - Winners (16): 1974, 1975, 1976, 1977, 1978, 1979, 1980, 1981, 1991, 1995, 1996, 1997, 1998, 1999, 2000, 2001
- National Championships – cross country running
  - Winners (2): 1977, 2006

=== Basketball ===
==== Men ====
National Championships – 22

- Yugoslav League
  - Winners (5): 1975–76, 1978–79, 1980–81, 1986–87, 1991–92
- FR Yugoslavia League
  - Winners (8): 1994–95, 1995–96, 1996–97, 2001–02, 2002–03, 2003–04, 2004–05, 2005–06
- Serbian League
  - Winners (9): 2006–07, 2007–08, 2008–09, 2009–10, 2010–11, 2011–12, 2012–13, 2013–14, 2024–25

National Cups – 16

- Yugoslav Cup
  - Winners (3): 1978–79, 1988–89, 1991–92
- FR Yugoslavia Cup
  - Winners (5): 1993–94, 1994–95, 1998–99, 1999–00, 2001–02
- Radivoj Korać Cup
  - Winners (8): 2007–08, 2008–09, 2009–10, 2010–11, 2011–12, 2017–18, 2018–19, 2019–20

Regional titles – 9

- ABA League
  - Winners (8): 2006–07, 2007–08, 2008–09, 2009–10, 2010–11, 2012–13, 2022–23, 2024–25
- ABA League Supercup
  - Winners (1): 2019

European titles – 4

- EuroLeague
  - Winners (1): 1991–92
  - Semifinalists (1): 1979–80
  - Third place (2): 1981–82, 1987–88
  - Fourth place (2): 1997–98, 2009–10
- FIBA Korać Cup
  - Winners (3): 1977–78, 1978–79, 1988–89
  - Runners-up (1): 1973–74
  - Semifinalists (1): 1974–75

==== Women ====
National Championships – 7

- Yugoslav League
  - Winners (3): 1983–84 1984–85, 1985–86
- Serbian League
  - Winners (4): 2009–10, 2010–11, 2011–12, 2012–13

National Cups – 5

- Yugoslav Cup
  - Winners (2): 1984–85, 1985–86
- Serbian Cup
  - Winners (3): 2010–11, 2012–13, 2017–18

Regional titles – 2

- WABA League
  - Winners (2): 2011–12, 2012–13

=== Football ===
National Championships – 27

- Yugoslav First League
  - Winners (11): 1946–47, 1948–49, 1960–61, 1961–62, 1962–63, 1964–65, 1975–76, 1977–78, 1982–83, 1985–86, 1986–87
- First League of Serbia and Montenegro
  - Winners (8): 1994–95, 1993–94, 1995–96, 1996–97, 1998–99, 2001–02, 2002–03, 2004–05
- Serbian SuperLiga
  - Winners (8): 2007–08, 2008–09, 2009–10, 2010–11, 2011–12, 2012–13, 2014–15, 2016–17

National Cups – 16

- Yugoslav Cup
  - Winners (6): 1946–47, 1951–52, 1953–54, 1956–57, 1988–89, 1991–92
- FR Yugoslavia Cup
  - Winners (3): 1993–94, 1997–98, 2000–01
- Serbian Cup
  - Winners (7): 2007–08, 2008–09, 2010–11, 2015–16, 2016–17, 2017–18, 2018–19

National Super Cup – 1

- Yugoslav Super Cup
  - Winners (1): 1989.

International titles – 1

- Mitropa Cup
  - Winners (1): 1978
- European Cup / UEFA Champions League
  - Runners up (1): 1965–66

=== Chess ===
==== Men ====
- National Championships
  - Winners (23): 1947, 1949, 1952, 1954, 1955, 1956, 1960, 1961, 1962, 1963, 1964, 1965, 1969, 1971, 1972, 1973, 1974, 1978, 1979, 1980, 1989, 1995, 2006
- National Cups
  - Winners (12): 1958, 1961, 1962, 1963, 1965, 1982, 1988, 1989, 1994, 1995, 2005, 2006
- European Chess Club Cup
  - Winners (1): 1956
- Western European Cup
  - Winners (1): 1954
- Mitropa Cup
  - Winners (1): 1953

==== Women ====
- National Championships
  - Winners (1): 1996
- National Cups
  - Winners (7): 1980, 1981, 1986, 1987, 1988, 1990, 1993

== Partizan Football Club ==
Honours

- Yugoslav First League/Serbia and Montenegro First League/Serbian SuperLiga: 27
  - 1946–47, 1948–49, 1960–61, 1961–62, 1962–63, 1964–65, 1975–76, 1977–78, 1982–83, 1985–86, 1986–87, 1992–93, 1993–94, 1995–96, 1996–97, 1998–99, 2001–02, 2002–03, 2004–05, 2007–08, 2008–09, 2009–10, 2010–11, 2011–12, 2012–13, 2014–15, 2016–17
- National Cups: 16
  - 1946–47, 1951–52, 1953–54, 1956–57, 1988–89, 1991–92, 1993–94, 1997–98, 2000–01, 2007–08, 2008–09, 2010–11, 2015–16, 2016–17, 2017–18, 2018–19
- National Supercups: 1
  - 1989
- Yugoslav Summer Champions League: 1
  - 1969
- Mitropa Cups: 1
  - 1978

== Partizan Basketball Club ==
=== Men ===
Honours

- EuroLeague
  - Winners (1): 1991–92
- FIBA Korać Cups
  - Winners (3): 1977–78, 1978–79, 1988–89
- National Championships: 22
  - 1975–76, 1978–79, 1980–81, 1986–87, 1991–92, 1994–95, 1995–96, 1996–97, 2001–02, 2002–03, 2003–04, 2004–05, 2005–06, 2006–07, 2007–08, 2008–09, 2009–10, 2010–11, 2011–12, 2012–13, 2013–14, 2024–25
- National Cups: 16 (record)
  - 1978–79, 1988–89, 1991–92, 1993–94, 1994–95, 1998–99, 1999–00, 2001–02, 2007–08, 2008–09, 2009–10, 2010–11, 2011–12, 2017–18, 2018–19, 2019–20
- ABA League
  - Winners (8)(record): 2006–07, 2007–08, 2008–09, 2009–10, 2010–11, 2012–13, 2022–23, 2024–25
- ABA League Supercup: 1
  - Winners (1) : 2019

=== Women ===
Honors

- National Championships: 7
  - 1983–84, 1984–85, 1985–86, 2009–10, 2010–11, 2011–12, 2012–13
- National Cups: 5
  - 1984–85, 1985–86, 2010–11, 2012–13, 2017–18
- WABA League : 2
  - 2011–12, 2012–13

== Partizan Swimming Club ==
- National Championships: 9
  - 1978. | 1988. | 1995. | 1996. | 1997. | 1998. | 1999. | 2000. | 2015.
- National Cups: 1
  - 1998

== Partizan Waterpolo Club ==
=== Men ===
Honors

- Yugoslav Water Polo Championship/Serbian Championship: 29 (record)
  - 1962–63, 1963–64, 1964–65, 1965–66, 1967–68, 1969–70, 1971–72, 1972–73, 1973–74, 1974–75, 1975–76, 1976–77, 1977–78, 1978–79, 1983–84, 1986–87, 1987–88, 1994–95, 2001–02, 2006–07, 2007–08, 2008–09, 2009–10, 2010–11, 2011–12, 2014–15, 2015–16, 2016–17, 2017–18
- Yugoslav Winter Championship: 6 (record)
  - 1963, 1965, 1968, 1969, 1971, 1972
- Yugoslav Cup/Serbian Cup: 25 (record)
  - 1972–73, 1973–74, 1974–75, 1975–76, 1976–77, 1978–79, 1984–85, 1986–87, 1987–88, 1989–90, 1990–91, 1991–92, 1992–93, 1993–94, 1994–95, 2001–02, 2006–07, 2007–08, 2008–09, 2009–10, 2010–11, 2011–12, 2015–16, 2016–17, 2017–18
- Euroleague
  - Winners (7) : 1963–64, 1965–66, 1966–67, 1970–71, 1974–75, 1975–76, 2010–11
- LEN Cup Winners' Cup
  - Winners (1) : 1990
- LEN Super Cup
  - Winners (2) : 1990–91, 2011–12
- LEN Cup
  - Winners (1) : 1997–98
- COMEN Cup
  - Winners (1) : 1989
- Euro Interliga
  - Winners (2) : 2010, 2011

=== Women ===
Honors

- National Cups: 1
  - 2012–13

== Partizan Handball Club ==
=== Men ===
Honors

- National Championships: 11
  - 1992–93, 1993–94, 1994–95, 1998–99, 2001–02, 2002–03, 2008–09, 2010–11, 2011–12, 2024–25, 2025–26
- Yugoslav Winter Championship: 1
  - 1963
- National Cups: 13 (record)
  - 1958–59, 1965–66, 1970–71, 1992–93, 1993–94, 1997–98, 2000–01, 2006–07, 2007–08, 2011–12, 2012–13, 2023–24, 2025–26
- National Supercups: 5
  - 2009, 2011, 2012, 2025–26, 2026
- All-Serbian Cup: 2
  - 2025–26, 2026

== Partizan Volleyball Club ==
=== Men ===
Honors

- National Championships: 12
  - 1945–46, 1946–47, 1948–49, 1949–50, 1952–53, 1966–67, 1972–73, 1977–78, 1989–90, 1990–91, 2010–11, 2022–23
- National Cups: 9
  - 1950, 1961, 1964, 1971, 1974, 1990, 1991, 2022, 2023
- National Supercups: 1
  - 2022

=== Women ===
- Yugoslav Championships: 8
  - 1951–52, 1954–55, 1955–56, 1956–57, 1957–58, 1959–60, 1960–61, 1967–68
- Serbian Volleyball Championship: 1
  - 2013–14
- Yugoslav Cups: 2
  - 1959, 1960
- Serbian Super Cup: 1
  - 2013

== Partizan Hockey Club ==
Honors

- Yugoslav Ice Hockey League/Serbian Hockey League : 20 (record)
  - 1947–48, 1950–51, 1951–52, 1952–53, 1953–54, 1954–55, 1985–86, 1993–94, 1994–95, 2005–06, 2006–07, 2007–08, 2008–09, 2009–10, 2010–11, 2011–12, 2012–13, 2013–14, 2014–15, 2015–16
- Yugoslav Ice Hockey Cup/Serbian Ice Hockey Cup: 3
  - 1966, 1986, 1995
- Balkan League
  - Winners (1) : 1994–95
- Slohokej League (record)
  - Winners (2) : 2010–11, 2011–12
- National Championships Inline Hockey: 2
  - 2015, 2016

== Partizan Rugby Club ==
Honors

- Rugby Championship of Yugoslavia
  - Winners (6) 1959, 1960, 1961, 1988, 1991, 1992
- Rugby Championship of FR Yugoslavia / Serbia and Montenegro (record)
  - Winners (11) 1993, 1994, 1996, 1997, 1998, 1999, 2002, 2003, 2004, 2005, 2006
- Rugby Championship of Serbia
  - Winners (4) 2018, 2019, 2020, 2021
- Rugby 7
  - Winners (8) 1997, 1998, 2002, 2003, 2013, 2018, 2021, 2025
- Rugby Championship of Serbia Rugby 10
  - Winners (1) 2016
- Rugby Cup of Yugoslavia
  - Winners (2) 1960, 1992
- Rugby Cup of FR Yugoslavia / Serbia and Montenegro / Serbia (record)
  - Winners (15) 1993, 1994, 1995, 1996, 1997, 1998, 1999, 2000, 2003, 2005, 2008, 2011, 2015, 2019, 2021

== Partizan Rugby League Club ==
Honors

- Serbian Rugby League Championship
  - Winners (2) 2024, 2025
- Serbian Rugby League Cup
  - Winners (4) 2017, 2021, 2022, 2025
- Serbian Rugby League Super Cup
  - Winners (4) 2021, 2022, 2023, 2024
- Balkan Super League
  - Winners (3) 2017, 2020, 2024

== Partizan Athletics Club ==
Honors

=== Men ===
- National Championships :
  - Winners (25) : 1947, 1948, 1949, 1950, 1951, 1952, 1956, 1957, 1958, 1959, 1960, 1961, 1962, 1963, 1964, 1966, 1984, 1991, 1996, 1997, 1998, 1999, 2000, 2001, 2012
- National Cups :
  - Winners (8) : 1965, 1991, 1996, 1997, 1998, 1999, 2000, 2001
- Quality Cups :
  - Winners (2) : 1948, 1949
- Cross Country Running National Championships
  - Winners (21): 1946, 1947, 1948, 1949, 1950, 1951, 1952, 1953, 1954, 1955, 1957, 1958, 1961, 1963, 1965, 1967, 1968, 1969, 1974, 1996, 2018
- Short Track Cross Country National Championships
  - Winners (12): 1947, 1949, 1950, 1951, 1952, 1953, 1954, 1955, 1957, 1958, 1960, 1961
- National Championships in Partizan's March
  - Winners (9): 1957, 1958, 1960, 1962, 1963, 1964, 1965, 1968, 1973

=== Women ===
- National Championships :
  - Winners (11) : 1974, 1975, 1978, 1979, 1980, 1991, 1996, 1997, 1998, 1999, 2001
- Cross Country Running National Championships
  - Winners (2): 1977, 2006
- National Cups :
  - Winners (16) : 1974, 1975, 1976, 1977, 1978, 1979, 1980, 1981, 1991, 1995, 1996, 1997, 1998, 1999, 2000, 2001

== Partizan Wrestling Club ==
Honors

- European Champions Cup
  - Winners (1): 2009.
- European CELA Cup
  - Winners (1): 2010.
- National Championships
  - Winners (12): 1951, 1953, 1954, 1955x2, 1956x2, 1957, 1959, 1992, 2008, 2009.
- National Cups
  - Winners (16): 1953, 1954, 1955, 1956, 1957, 1998, 2002, 2004, 2005, 2006, 2010, 2011, 2012, 2013, 2019, 2021.
- National Supercups
  - Winners (2): 2002, 2006.

== Partizan Judo Club ==
Men:

Honors

- Yugoslavian Championship
  - Winners (1) : 1963
- Serbian Championship
  - Winners (5) : 1994, 2001, 2005, 2007, 2008
- Serbian Cup
  - Winners (1) : 2007

Women:

- Serbian Championships
  - Winners (1) : 2025

== Partizan Chess Club ==
Men:

Honours

- Yugoslavian Championship (record)
  - Winners (23) : 1947, 1949, 1952, 1954, 1955, 1956, 1960, 1961, 1962, 1963, 1964, 1965, 1969, 1971, 1972, 1973, 1974, 1978, 1979, 1980, 1989, 1995, 2006
- Yugoslavian Cup
  - Winners (12) : 1958, 1961, 1962, 1963, 1965, 1982, 1988, 1989, 1994, 1995, 2005, 2006
- European Chess Club Cup
  - Winners (1) : 1956.
- Mitropa Cup
  - Winners (1) : 1953.
- Western European Cup
  - Winners (1) : 1954.

Women:

- National Championships: 1
  - 1996
- National Cups: 7
  - 1980. | 1981. | 1986. | 1987. | 1988. | 1990. | 1993.

== Partizan Karate Club ==
Honours

=== Men ===
- National Championships
  - Winners (3) : 1989, 1995, 2012
- National Cups
  - Winners (6): 1994, 1995, 2000, 2001, 2002, 2006
- European Championship
  - Winners (2) : 2000, 2001

=== Women ===
- National Championships
  - Winners (16): 1989, 1990, 1991, 1992, 1993, 1994, 1995, 1996, 1998, 1999, 2000, 2001, 2002, 2009, 2011, 2018
- National Cups
  - Winners (12): 1994, 1995, 1996, 1998, 1999, 2000, 2002, 2006, 2010, 2011, 2013, 2025

== Partizan Table Tennis Club ==
Honours

=== Men ===
- National Championships: 13 (record)
  - 1955–56, 1956–57, 1958–59, 1959–60, 1965–66, 1988–89, 1989–90, 1990–91, 1991–92, 2005–06, 2006–07, 2007–08, 2023–24
- National Cups: 1
  - 1962

=== Women ===
- Yugoslav Championships: 4
  - 1954–55, 1955–56, 1956–57, 1959–60

== Partizan Tennis Club ==
Honours

=== Men ===
- National championships
  - Winners (18) : 1956, 1957, 1958, 1959, 1961, 1985, 1986, 1989, 1992, 1993, 1994, 1995, 1996, 1997, 2001, 2003, 2005, 2007

=== Women ===
- National championships
  - Winners (11) : 1963, 1968, 1970, 1971, 1972, 1973, 1974, 1975, 2000, 2009, 2012

- Mixed Teams
- National Championships: 2
  - 1952, 1953

== Partizan Bowling Club ==
Honors

- National Championships: 7
  - 1993–94, 1994–95, 1995–96, 1999–00, 2000–01, 2006–07, 2018–19
- National Cups: 1
  - 2018–19

== Partizan 3x3 ==
Honors

- National Championships: 2
  - 2023, 2024
- Winter Championships: 1
  - 2022–23

== Partizan Rowing Club ==
- National Championships
  - Winners (8): 1967, 2019, 2020, 2021, 2022, 2023, 2024, 2025
- National championship on ergometers
  - Winners (24): 1994, 1996, 2000, 2001, 2002, 2004, 2005, 2007, 2008, 2009, 2011, 2012, 2013, 2014, 2015, 2016, 2017, 2018, 2020, 2021, 2022, 2023, 2024, 2025
- National Cups
  - Winners (4): 1997, 1998, 2001, 2002

== Partizan Boxing Club ==
- National Championships
  - Winners (7): 1949, 1950, 1951, 1954, 1958, 1960, 1964
- National Cups
  - Winners (1): 1965

== Partizan Rhythmic Gymnastics Club ==
- National Championships
  - Winners (7): 1988, 1989, 1990, 1991, 1997, 1998, 1999

== Partizan Weightlifting Club ==
Men:

- National Championships
  - Winners (4): 2001, 2002x2, 2003

Women:

- National Championships
  - Winners (9): 2008, 2009, 2016, 2017, 2018, 2022, 2023, 2024, 2025

== Partizan Mountaineering Club ==
- National Championships
  - Winners (3): 1955, 1958, 1965

== Partizan Esports Club ==
- Esports Balkan League (League of Legends)
  - Winners (3): 2024, 2025, 2026
- eFootball Pro Champions (eFootball)
  - Winners (1): 2023
- RES Adriatic League (Counter Strike: Global Offensive)
  - Winners (1): 2022

== Partizan Fencing Club ==
Women:

- National Championships
  - Winners (2): 2024, 2025 (Épée)

== Partizan Cycling Club ==
- National Championships
  - Winners - 29 in 7 different disciplines: 1947, 1948, 1950x2, 1953, 1954, 1955x2, 1958x2, 2002, 2003x2, 2006, 2008, 2009, 2010x2, 2011, 2015, 2016, 2017, 2018, 2020, 2021x2, 2023x3
- National Cups
  - Winners - 4 in 3 different disciplines: 1979, 2016, 2017, 2021

== Partizan Shooting Club ==
Men:

- National Championships
  - Winners - 54 in 14 different disciplines
- National Cups
  - Winners - 14 in 3 different disciplines

Women:

- National Championships
  - Winners - 42 in 6 different disciplines
- National Cups
  - Winners - 4 in 2 different disciplines

== Trophies ==
Sport	National Championships	National Cups	National Supercups	Winter Championships	Regional Trophies	European Trophies	Total trophies
Football	27	16	1	—	1	—	45
Men's Basketball	22	16	—	—	9	4	51
Women's Basketball	7	5	—	—	2	—	14
Men's Volleyball	12	9	1	—	—	—	22
Women's Volleyball	9	2	1	—	—	—	12
Men's Handball	11	13	5	1	—	—	30
Men's Water Polo	29	25	—	6	3	11	74
Women's Water Polo	—	1	—	—	—	—	1
