= Dragiša Šarić =

Serbian basketball player (1961–2008)

Personal information
- Born: 27 January 1961 Bijeljina, PR Bosnia and Herzegovina, Yugoslavia
- Died: 19 July 2008 (aged 47) Pula, Croatia
- Listed height: 2.02 m (6 ft 8 in)

Career information
- NBA draft: 1983: undrafted
- Playing career: 1978–1999
- Position: Small forward
- Coaching career: 1999–2008

Career history

Playing
- 1978–1980: Radnik Bijeljina
- 1980–1981: Ušće
- 1981–1987: Radnički Beograd
- 1987–1991: Vojvodina
- 1991–1992: Partizan
- 1992–1993: Profikolor Pančevo
- 1993–1994: Honvéd
- 1994–1997: Beobanka
- 1999: Skallagrímur

Coaching
- 1999: Skallagrímur
- 2001–2002: Lavovi 063 (assistant)
- 2003–2005: NIS Vojvodina (assistant)
- 2005–2007: Vizura Ušće
- 2007: Mega Aqua Monta
- 2007–2008: Partizan (assistant)

Career highlights
- EuroLeague champion (1992); Yugoslav League champion (1992); Yugoslav Cup winner (1992)

Dragiša Šarić (Serbian Cyrillic: Драгиша Шарић; 27 January 1961 – 19 July 2008) was a Serbian basketball player and coach.

== Career ==
=== Club career ===
Šarić played for several clubs in his country, most notably with the KK Partizan generation that won the 1991–92 Euroleague.

=== Coaching career ===
Šarić was an assistant coach with Partizan. Before that, he was also the head coach of Vizura.

Šarić was also player-coach for Úrvalsdeild karla club Skallagrímur from July 1999 until his resignation in November that same year.

== Death ==
Šarić died while on a vacation in Pula, Croatia on 19 July 2008 from heart-related issues.
