= Partisan =

Partisan(s) or The Partisan(s) may refer to:

== Military ==
- Partisan (military), paramilitary forces engaged behind the front line
  - Francs-tireurs et partisans, communist-led French anti-fascist resistance against Nazi Germany during WWII
  - Italian Partisans, communist-led anti-fascist resistance against Nazi Germany and the Fascist Italian Social Republic during WWII
  - Soviet Partisans, communist-led anti-fascist resistance against Nazi Germany during WWII
  - Yugoslav Partisans, communist-led anti-fascist resistance against Nazi Germany and the Independent State of Croatia during WWII
    - Slovene Partisans, communist-led anti-fascist resistance against Nazi Germany during WWII
    - Croatian Partisans, communist-led anti-fascist resistance against Nazi Germany and the Independent State of Croatia during WWII
    - Macedonian Partisans, communist-led anti-fascist resistance against Nazi Germany during WWII
- Partisan (weapon), a polearm

== Films ==
- Hell River, a 1974 Yugoslavian film also known as Partisans
- Partisan (film), a 2015 Australian film
- The Partisan (film), a 2024 Polish–British film

== Music ==
- "The Partisan", a World War II anti-fascist song, later popularized by Leonard Cohen
- Partisan Records, an American independent record label
- The Partisans (band), a 1980s punk band
- New Partisans, the mid-1980s movement on the Yugoslav rock scene

== Other uses ==
- Partisan (politics), a committed member of a political party
- Partisan game, where two players in a game analyzed by combinatorial game theory have different possible moves
- Partisans (architectural firm), an architecture firm based in Toronto
- Partisans (novel), a 1982 novel by Alistair MacLean
- The Partisans (sculpture), in Boston
- Partisans 1941, a 2020 real-time tactics video game
- Partisan (magazine), an online magazine publishing articles from particular factions of the Democratic Socialists of America.

== See also ==
- Partisan Review, a United States political and literary quarterly
- Partizan (disambiguation)
- Partizani (disambiguation)
