= Predrag Jaćimović =

Serbian basketball coach (born 1957)

Personal information
- Born: 25 November 1957 (age 68) Smederevska Palanka, SR Serbia, Yugoslavia
- Listed height: 1.78 m (5 ft 10 in)
- Position: Head coach
- Coaching career: 1997–present

Career history

Coaching
- 1997–2000: Partizan (youth)
- 2000: Milicionar Beograd
- 2001: Astra Banka
- 2001–2002: OKK Beograd
- 2003: Lavovi 063
- 2003: Crvena zvezda (assistant)
- 2004: Banjalučka pivara
- 2004–2005: Krka
- 2005–2008: Ergonom
- 2008–2010: Parklji
- 2010: Crnokosa
- 2011: MZT Skopje
- 2011–2013: Radnik Bijeljina
- 2013: Zlatorog Laško
- 2014–2015: Napredak Aleksinac
- 2015–2016: Zlatibor
- 2016–2017: Konstantin
- 2017: Plana
- 2017–2018: Rtanj
- 2018–2019: Plana

Career highlights
- YUBA B League champion (2002)

Predrag "Peca" Jaćimović (Serbian Cyrillic: Предраг Јаћимовић) is a Serbian basketball coach.

== Coaching career ==
Jaćimović coached Lavovi 063, OKK Beograd, Ergonom, Napredak Aleksinac, Crnokosa, Zlatibor and Konstantin. He also coached clubs in Bosnia and Herzegovina (Banjalučka pivara and Radnik Bijeljina), Slovenia (Zlatorog Laško and Krka) and Macedonia (MZT Skopje).
