= Tekvondo Klub Partizan =

- Founded: 1996
- Colors
- Head coach: Branko Gojković

Tekvondo Klub Partizan is a Taekwondo club from Belgrade, Serbia. The club is part of the sports society JSD Partizan. The club is a relatively new member of the Partizan organization, as it was formed on February 15, 1996, while most other clubs have been formed in the late 1940s and 1950s.

The club ranks in the top four in the country.

The club is also open to getting new members to join. It occasionally has free membership/training for a period of time. It is also involved in various humanitarian efforts.
