= Billy Baron =

American basketball player

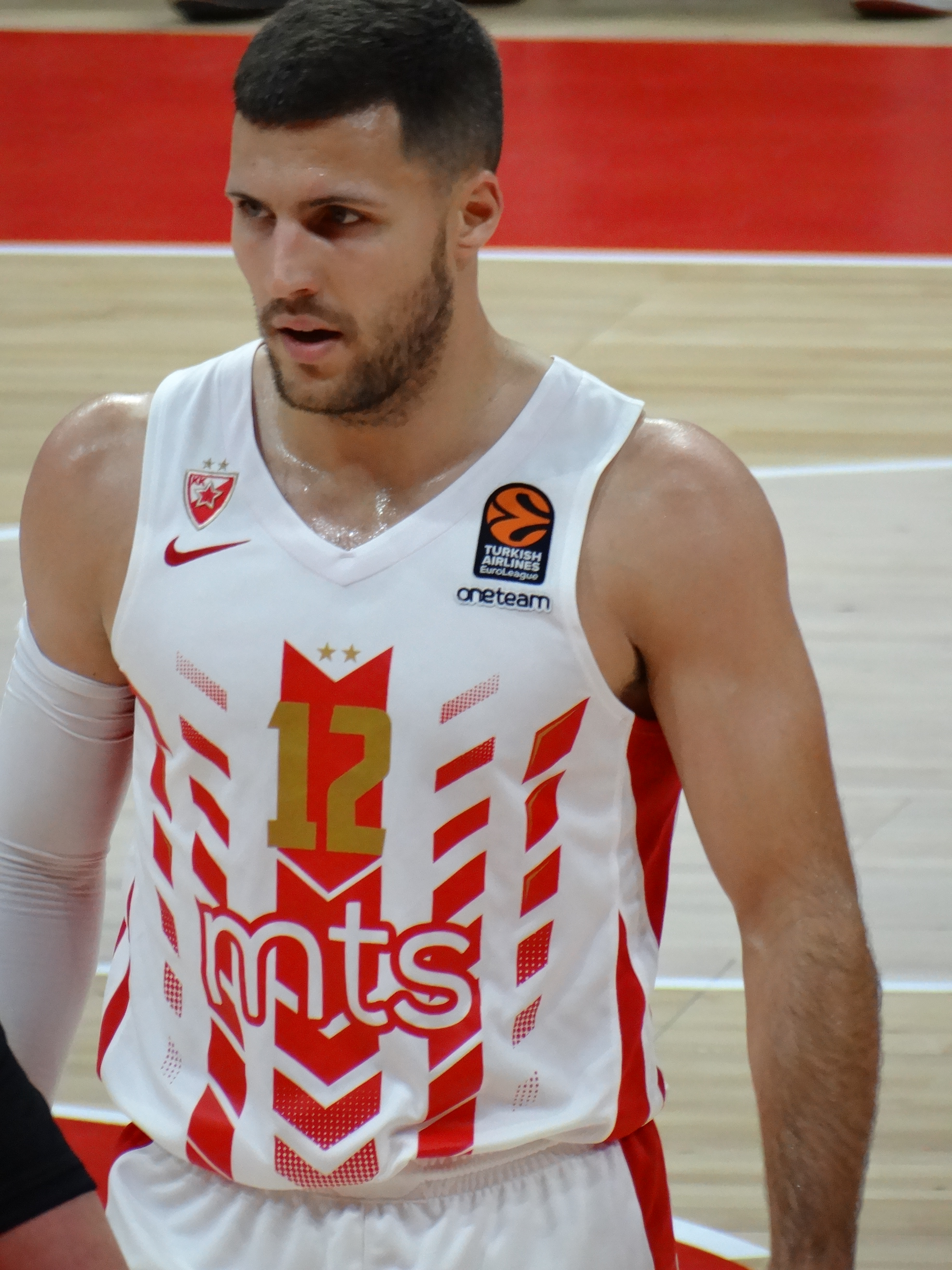
- Baron playing for Crvena zvezda in 2019

Personal information
- Born: December 11, 1990 (age 35) Altoona, Pennsylvania, U.S.
- Listed height: 6 ft 2 in (1.88 m)
- Listed weight: 195 lb (88 kg)

Career information
- High school: Bishop Hendricken (Warwick, Rhode Island); Worcester Academy (Worcester, Massachusetts)
- College: Virginia (2010–2011); Rhode Island (2011–2012); Canisius (2012–2014)
- NBA draft: 2014: undrafted
- Playing career: 2014–2024
- Position: Shooting guard

Career history
- 2014–2015: Lietuvos rytas
- 2015–2016: Charleroi
- 2016–2017: Murcia
- 2017–2018: Eskişehir
- 2018–2020: Crvena zvezda
- 2020–2022: Zenit Saint Petersburg
- 2022–2024: Olimpia Milano

Career highlights
- 2x LBA champion (2023, 2024); VTB United League champion (2022); VTB United League Supercup winner (2022); VTB United League Sixth Man of the Year (2022); All-VTB United League Second Team (2022); VTB United League Three-point contest champion (2022); VTB United League All-Star (2022); ABA League champion (2019); Serbian League champion (2019); ABA League Finals MVP (2019); Serbian League Finals MVP (2019); ABA League Supercup winner (2018); MAAC Player of the Year (2014); 2× First-team All-MAAC (2013, 2014)
Medals
Men's basketball
Representing United States
FIBA AmeriCup
Gold medal – first place	2017 Argentina

William James Baron (born December 11, 1990) is an American former professional basketball player. He is a 1.88 m (6 ft 2 in) tall shooting guard.

== High school ==
Baron born in Altoona, Pennsylvania, attended and played high school basketball at Bishop Hendricken High School, in Warwick, Rhode Island, and at Worcester Academy, in Worcester, Massachusetts.

== College career ==
=== University of Virginia ===
In November 2010, it was announced that Baron was going to be joining University of Virginia for his freshman season.

On February 3, 2011, it was announced that Baron was leaving the Virginia men's basketball program and was planning on transferring to University of Rhode Island that semester where his father was the men's head basketball coach. He had played in 17 games and averaged 3 points.

=== University of Rhode Island ===
In June 2012, Baron decided to leave the program after his father was fired as coach. He had two years eligibility remaining at whichever school he chose. In 20 games with Rhode Island, Baron averaged 13 points and 4.5 rebounds per game.

=== Canisius College ===
In July 2012, Baron followed his father to Canisius College to finish out his collegiate career.

In August 2012, Canisius announced that Baron had submitted the necessary paperwork to enroll at Canisius. Additionally, Canisius waiver to allow Baron's immediate eligibility for the fall of 2012 was granted by the NCAA.

During the 2012–2013 season, he played in 34 games, making 33 starts. He was named to the All-MAAC First Team and became the first Griff to earn that distinction since Darren Fenn in 1999–2000. Baron scored a total of 584 points, the most for a Canisius player in 28 seasons. He led the team and ranked third in the MAAC with his 17.2 points per game. He also led the MAAC with 5 assists per game, which ranked 62nd nationally. Baron was named the Canisius Male Student Athlete of the Year.

During the 2013–2014 season, Baron was an AP All-America Honorable Mention, just the fourth player in program history to earn All-America honors. He was named the Pepsi MAAC Player of the year and earned All-MAAC First Team honors for the second straight season. Baron played in 34 games and started in 34 games. He led the team and ranked second in the MAAC with 24.1 points per game. He is the third Canisius player to average better than 24 points per game for a season. Baron was the first male athlete at Canisius to win the Male Athlete of the Year award in back-to-back academic years.

In May 2026, Baron was selected to be part of the 60th induction class to the Canisius University Sports Hall of Fame.

== Professional career ==
=== Chicago Bulls (2014 July) ===
In June 2014, it was announced that Baron would be joining the Chicago Bulls for NBA Summer League after going undrafted. He played in 5 games and averaged 5.6 points, 2.4 assists and 3.4 rebounds per game.

=== Lietuvos Rytas Vilnius (2014-2015) ===
On July 22, 2014, Baron announced that he had signed a contract with BC Rytas of Lietuvos krepšinio lyga.

=== Detroit Pistons (2015 July) ===
In June 2015, Baron became a member of the Detroit Pistons NBA Summer League team. He played in 2 games and averaged 4 points, 2 rebounds and 1 assist.

=== Proximus Spirou Charleroi (2015-2016) ===
In August 2015, Baron signed with Spirou Charleroi where he joined his brother who was signed to the same team.

=== Universidad Catolica de Murcia CB (2016-2017) ===
In July 2016, Baron signed with UCAM Murcia CB.

=== Eskisehir Basket (2017-2018) ===
In July 2017, Baron signed with Eskişehir Basket.

=== KK Crvena zvezda MTS Beograd (2018-2020) ===
On July 14, 2018, Baron signed with KK Crvena zvezda. He became the first signing of the club for the season.

On June 10, 2019, Baron extending his contract with the team to stay for a second season. In his previous season, he helped the team win the ABA League and clinch a spot in the 2019-2020 EuroLeague by averaging 11.6 points, 2.7 assists, and 2.3 rebounds per game.

=== Zenit Sankt Petersburg (2020-2022) ===
On July 15, 2020, Baron signed a two-year deal with BC Zenit Saint Petersburg of the VTB United League after finishing the 2019–2020 season with an average of 11.6 points, 2.7 rebounds, and 2.2 assists per game.

On July 2, 2021, Baron and the club decided to commit for one extra year ahead of time. During the 2020–2021 season, he was recognized as MVP of September–October in the league. He played 25 matches in the tournament and averaged 10.4 points, 1.6 rebounds and 2.5 assists.

On December 31, 2021, Baron was named the Turkish Airlines EuroLeague Regular Season Round 18 MVP after leading his team by scoring 25 points, 6 assists and 4 rebounds.

=== AX Armani Exchange Milano (2022-2024) ===
On June 28, 2022, Baron signed with Olimpia Milano of Lega Basket.

In November 2022, Baron suffered a hamstring injury in his left thigh after a game against Real Madrid which had him sidelined for two weeks.

In May 2023, Baron was named Eurobasket.com All-Euroleague Honorable Mention.

In June 2023, Baron underwent surgery in his right elbow one day after helping his team in the best of seven finals of the league. In October 2023, Baron had to undergo another surgery on his right elbow followed by a six-week rehabilitation period. In February 2024, Baron was sidelined indefinitely after undergoing treatment and more evaluations for his injury. In January 2024, he had been ruled out for two to three weeks following more medical tests on his elblow. In March 2024, Baron had been ruled out for the remainder of the 2023–2024 season as he was expected to undergo a further surgery procedure to his right elbow. In his second year with the club, he averaged 1.8 points, 2.3 assists and 1.8 rebounds.

=== Shanghai Sharks (2024) ===
On September 26, 2024, Baron signed with Shanghai Sharks of the Chinese Basketball Association.

=== Retirement ===
On October 12, 2024, Baron announced his retirement from basketball on social media stating that he had been struggling with injury issues over the last couple of seasons.

== National team career ==
Baron has been a member of the senior United States national team. He was a member of Team USA at the 2017 FIBA AmeriCup, where he won a gold medal.

== Career statistics ==
Legend
GP	Games played	GS	Games started	MPG	Minutes per game
FG%	Field-goal percentage	3P%	3-point field-goal percentage	FT%	Free-throw percentage
RPG	Rebounds per game	APG	Assists per game	SPG	Steals per game
BPG	Blocks per game	PPG	Points per game	PIR	Performance index rating
**Bold**	Career high

=== EuroLeague ===
Year	Team	GP	GS	MPG	FG%	3P%	FT%	RPG	APG	SPG	BPG	PPG	PIR
2019–20	Crvena zvezda	26	**25**	24.6	.419	.403	.855	**2.7**	2.2	.8	.0	**11.6**	11.0
2020–21	Zenit	**39**	1	18.6	.449	**.448**	.865	1.4	1.7	.4	.0	9.6	7.8
2021–22	Zenit	23	1	20.4	.404	.357	.836	1.7	2.2	.2	—	11.2	9.9
2022–23	Olimpia Milano	30	16	**25.1**	**.459**	.403	.875	2.4	2.1	.6	.0	11.0	**11.1**
2023–24	Olimpia Milano	3	0	15.7	.273	.000	**1.000**	2.3	**3.0**	**1.3**	—	2.3	3.7
Career		121	43	21.8	.433	.402	.859	2.0	2.0	.5	.0	10.5	9.6

=== EuroCup ===
Year	Team	GP	GS	MPG	FG%	3P%	FT%	RPG	APG	SPG	BPG	PPG	PIR
2014–15	Lietuvos rytas	**17**	0	11.5	**.534**	.475	.700	1.0	.8	.3	—	6.1	5.3
2015–16	Spirou Charleroi	10	10	**32.7**	.446	.459	.846	**3.6**	**4.2**	**.7**	—	**20.7**	**17.8**
2016–17	UCAM Murcia	14	12	25.4	.400	.341	**.909**	2.2	2.3	**.7**	—	13.0	9.9
2018–19	Crvena zvezda	16	**16**	26.9	.500	**.494**	.816	2.6	2.8	.5	—	12.9	13.2
Career		57	38	23.0	.459	.437	.842	2.2	2.3	.5	—	12.3	10.8

=== Domestic leagues ===
Year	Team	League	GP	MPG	FG%	3P%	FT%	RPG	APG	SPG	BPG	PPG
2014–15	(Lithuania) Lietuvos rytas	LKL	45	14.6	.416	.373	.607	1.5	1.4	.5	.0	5.7
2015–16	(Belgium) Spirou Charleroi	PBL	30	28.8	.453	.419	.840	2.5	3.9	1.6	.2	16.8
2016–17	(Spain) UCAM Murcia	ACB	32	22.2	.406	.359	.932	1.9	1.4	.5	.0	10.6
2017–18	(Turkey) Eskişehir	TBSL	31	32.1	.453	.439	.895	2.7	3.4	.7	.1	15.8
2018–19	(Serbia) Crvena zvezda	KLS	14	20.3	.485	.452	.900	2.1	2.9	.4	.1	10.9
2018–19	(Serbia) Crvena zvezda	ABA	29	22.0	.487	.418	.847	2.3	2.7	1.0	—	11.5
2019–20	(Serbia) Crvena zvezda	ABA	18	23.8	.478	.430	.800	2.4	2.4	.8	—	12.4
2020–21	(Russia) Zenit	VTBUL	25	20.2	.445	.435	.846	1.6	2.5	.5	—	10.4
2021–22	(Russia) Zenit	VTBUL	21	21.8	.446	.426	.931	1.8	2.3	.5	—	13.5
2022–23	(Italy) Olimpia Milano	LBA	36	22.1	.488	.429	.934	2.2	2.5	.8	.0	11.5
2023–24	(Italy) Olimpia Milano	LBA	2	9.5	.200	1.000	1.000	—	—	1.0	—	2.5

=== College ===
Year	Team	GP	GS	MPG	FG%	3P%	FT%	RPG	APG	SPG	BPG	PPG
2010–11	Virginia	17	0	11.1	.313	.316	.692	.7	.8	.4	—	3.0
2011–12	Rhode Island	20	14	32.3	.404	.312	.827	4.5	2.6	1.2	—	13.0
2012–13	Canisius	**34**	33	34.8	.439	.382	.824	4.1	5.0	1.0	—	17.2
2013–14	Canisius	**34**	**34**	**39.0**	**.464**	**.421**	**.884**	**4.9**	**5.3**	**1.6**	—	**24.1**
Career		105	81	31.8	.439	.384	.850	3.9	4.0	1.1	—	16.3

== Personal ==
Baron is the son of former Canisius basketball head coach, Jim Baron, and the younger brother of the professional basketball player, Jimmy Baron. Baron is married to former Canisius college softball player Valorie Nappo. The two met in college when they were both student athletes at Canisius.

== See also ==
- List of KK Crvena zvezda players with 100 games played
