= KK Dinamo Pančevo =

Basketball club in Pančevo, Serbia

Dinamo Pančevo
- Leagues: 2nd Men's Regional League
- Founded: 1946; 79 years ago
- History: KK Sloga; 1946–1947; KK Dinamo; 1947–present
- Location: Pančevo, Serbia
- Team colors: Blue and White

Košarkaški klub Dinamo (Serbian Cyrillic: Кошаркашки клуб Динамо), commonly referred to as Dinamo Pančevo, is a men's and women's basketball club based in Pančevo, Serbia. The men's team has been competing in the 4th-tier Second Regional League, West Division.

== History ==
The club was founded in 1946 as KK Sloga. In the next year, they changed the name to Dinamo. The biggest success of the men's team was in 1961 when they played in the Yugoslav First League. They finished that season with a 1–17 record and got relegated.

During the 1990s, the men's team worked mostly with youth. In 2006, the men's team joined with Tamiš in their work with youth selections.

In the 1996–97 season, the women's team won the Yugoslav League and the Yugoslav Cup. The women's team lost in the semifinals in the 1996–97 Ronchetti Cup season.

== Sponsorship naming ==
The Dinamo women's team had several denominations through the years due to its sponsorship:

- Profi D: 1990s

== Men's team ==
=== Players ===
- Zlatko Sajkov – 1952–1968

=== Coaches ===
- Bela Bece – 1946
- Todor Lazić – 1959–1961, 1964–1967
- Branislav Rajačić – 1967
- Zlatko Sajkov – 1968
- Vladan Marković – 1968–1973
- Srđan Vlajković – 1973–1976
- Branko Jokić – 1976–1977
- Borislav Ćorković – 1977–1978
- Todor Lazić – 1978–1980
- Dragoljub Pljakić – 1980–1981
- Mihajlo Pujić – 1983–1984
- Srđan Vlajković – 1984–1985
- Darko Jovičić – 2020–present

== Women's team ==
=== Players ===
- Gordana Bogojević – 1996–1997

=== Coaches ===
- Todor Lazić – 1980–1982, 1983
- Miroslav Kanjevac – 1995–1997, 2006–2007

== Trophies and awards ==
=== Trophies ===
Yugoslav Women's League

- Winners (1) – 1996–97

Yugoslav Women's Cup

- Winners (1) – 1997

=== Awards ===
Yugoslav First League scoring leader

- Zlatko Sajkov – 1961

== See also ==
- List of basketball clubs in Serbia by major honours won
- FK Dinamo Pančevo
- KK Tamiš
- KK Profikolor
