= KK Vizura =

Basketball club in Belgrade, Serbia

- Leagues: First Regional League of Serbia
- Founded: 2003; 22 years ago
- History: KK Vizura; 2003–2005; KK Vizura Ušće; 2005–2007; KK Vizura; 2007–2009; KK Mega Vizura; 2009–2014; KK Vizura; 2014–present
- Arena: Vizura Sports Center
- Capacity: 1,500
- Location: Belgrade, Serbia
- Team colors: Blue, White

Košarkaški klub Vizura (Serbian Cyrillic: Кошаркашки клуб Визура), commonly referred to as KK Vizura, is a men's basketball club based in Belgrade, Serbia. The club plays in the First Regional League of Serbia. Their home arena is the Vizura Sports Center.

== History ==
The club was formed in 2003 under the name KK Vizura. In 2005, it merged with Ušće to form KK Vizura Ušće. In 2007, the name was switched back to KK Vizura.

In August 2009, before the start of the 2009–10 BLS season, the senior team merged with KK Mega Basket. In 2016, the new senior team joined the 4th-tier Second Regional League of Serbia. They got promoted to the 3rd-tier First Regional League of Serbia in the 2019–20 season.

== Sponsorship naming ==
The club has had several denominations through the years due to its sponsorship:

- Vizura Shark (2014–2017)

== Home arena ==
Vizura plays its home games at the Vizura Sports Center. The hall is located in the New Belgrade Municipality on the Tošin Bunar Street, Belgrade and was built in 2002. It has a seating capacity of 1,500 seats.

== Coaches ==
- (Serbia) Dragiša Šarić (2005–2007)
- (Serbia) Oliver Popović (2007–2008)
- (Serbia) Vinko Bakić (2008)
- (Serbia) Oliver Popović (2008)
- (Serbia) Ivica Mavrenski (2008–2009)
- No senior team coaches, 2009–2016
- (Serbia) Aleksandar Bućan (2019–2021)

== Season by season ==
Season	Tier	Division	Pos.	Postseason	W–L	National Cup
2003–04			N/A	—	N/A	—
2004–05			N/A	—	N/A	—
2005–06	2	BLSM B League	4	—	18–8	—
2006–07	2	BLS B League	2	—	21–5	—
2007–08	1	BLS First League	2	SL 8th	15–21	—
2008–09	1	BLS First League	13	—	9–17	—
No competition
2016–17	4	2nd Reg League	9	—	5–13	—
2017–18	4	2nd Reg League	9	—	13–15	—
2018–19	4	2nd Reg League	B3	PO 4th	15–13	—
2019–20	3	1st Reg League	Abd	—	4–13	—
2020–21	3	1st Reg League	B6	PT 3rd	3–15	—
2021–22	3	1st Reg League	B8	PT 8th	2–20	—

== Notable players ==
Note: Flags indicate national team eligibility at FIBA-sanctioned events. Players may hold other non-FIBA nationalities not displayed.

Criteria

To appear in this section a player must have either:

- Set a club record or won an individual award while at the club
- Played at least one official international match for their national team at any time
- Played at least one official NBA match at any time.

- (Serbia) Aleksandar Glintić
- (Serbia) Stevan Jelovac
- (Serbia) Sava Lešić
