= 1980–81 Yugoslav First Basketball League =

- League: Yugoslav First Basketball League
- Sport: Basketball

1980-81
- Season champions: (Socialist Republic of Serbia) Partizan

Yugoslav First Basketball League seasons
- ← 1979–80 1981–82 →

The 1980–81 Yugoslav First Basketball League season was the 37th season of the Yugoslav First Basketball League, the highest professional basketball league in SFR Yugoslavia. The season ended with Partizan winning the league championship; despite finishing the season with an identical 19-3 record as Cibona, Partizan was better in their seasonal head-to-head, winning both of their contests during the season.

== Notable events ==
=== Partizan vs. Cibona season series ===
The season was decided in two Partizan-Cibona games. First one was played in Zagreb during the first part of the season. The visiting team jumped out to an early 20+ point lead carried by Dragan Kićanović, Miško Marić, and Boban Petrović. However, in the second half, led by its center line — consisting of 32-year-old veteran Krešimir Ćosić who returned to Yugoslav League after two years in Italy and promising young prospect Andro Knego — Cibona annulled Partizan's first half lead. Still, Partizan held their nerve at the end, winning the game 94-95. Kićanović led all scorers with 32 points while his teammates Marić and Petrović contributed with 25 and 22 points, respectively. On the other side, Cibona's veteran center Ćosić scored 28 points while Knego added 26.

The second Partizan-Cibona game of the season was played during spring 1981 in Belgrade. It turned out to be almost a carbon copy of the first one. Cheered on by a large and boisterous home crowd, Partizan jumped out to an early lead of over 20 points again before Cibona again stormed back in the second half. Partizan again proved calmer in a tense finish with Boban Petrović making a clutch bank jump shot that won the game for the Belgrade club 91-87. Petrović and Kićanović led Partizan in this key contest with 26 points each while Arsenije Pešić added 14. In Cibona, Knego and Željko Pavličević led the scoring with 27 and 24 points, respectively while its two best players Aco Petrović and Ćosić had a poor shooting night with only 7 and 4 points, respectively.

== Teams ==
(Socialist Republic of Croatia) SR Croatia

- Cibona
- Jugoplastika
- Kvarner
- Šibenka
- Zadar

(Socialist Republic of Serbia) SR Serbia

- Crvena Zvezda
- Partizan
- Radnički LMK Belgrade

(Socialist Republic of Bosnia and Herzegovina) SR Bosnia and Herzegovina

- Bosna

(Socialist Republic of Macedonia) SR Macedonia

- Rabotnički

(Socialist Republic of Montenegro) SR Montenegro

- Budućnost

(Socialist Republic of Slovenia) SR Slovenia

- Iskra Olimpija

== Classification ==
| | Regular season ranking 1980-81 | G | V | P | PF | PS | Pt |
|---|---|---|---|---|---|---|---|
| 1. | Partizan | 22 | 19 | 3 | 2162 | 1993 | 38 |
| 2. | Cibona | 22 | 19 | 3 | 2177 | 1925 | 38 |
| 3. | Zadar | 22 | 14 | 8 | 2184 | 2104 | 28 |
| 4. | Šibenka | 22 | 12 | 10 | 2035 | 1972 | 24 |
| 5. | Crvena Zvezda | 22 | 11 | 11 | 2159 | 2129 | 22 |
| 6. | Iskra Olimpija | 22 | 10 | 12 | 1987 | 2024 | 20 |
| 7. | Bosna | 22 | 10 | 12 | 2079 | 1998 | 20 |
| 8. | Budućnost | 22 | 9 | 13 | 1795 | 1892 | 18 |
| 9. | Radnički LMK Belgrade | 22 | 9 | 13 | 1939 | 2003 | 18 |
| 10. | Rabotnički | 22 | 8 | 14 | 1998 | 2178 | 16 |
| 11. | Jugoplastika | 22 | 7 | 15 | 1939 | 2102 | 14 |
| 12. | Kvarner | 22 | 4 | 18 | 1987 | 2121 | 8 |

The winning roster of Partizan:

- (Socialist Federal Republic of Yugoslavia) Dragan Kićanović
- (Socialist Federal Republic of Yugoslavia) Boban Petrović
- (Socialist Federal Republic of Yugoslavia) Miško Marić
- (Socialist Federal Republic of Yugoslavia) Arsenije Pešić
- (Socialist Federal Republic of Yugoslavia) Dragan Todorić
- (Socialist Federal Republic of Yugoslavia) Dušan Kerkez
- (Socialist Federal Republic of Yugoslavia) Goran Despotović
- (Socialist Federal Republic of Yugoslavia) Milan Medić
- (Socialist Federal Republic of Yugoslavia) Milenko Savović
- (Socialist Federal Republic of Yugoslavia) Dragan Milutinović
- (Socialist Federal Republic of Yugoslavia) Nebojša Bukumirović
- (Socialist Federal Republic of Yugoslavia) Danko Cvjetićanin
- (Socialist Federal Republic of Yugoslavia) Dragan Kovačević

Coach: (Socialist Federal Republic of Yugoslavia) Borislav Ćorković

== Results ==
| Home \ Away | PAR | CIB | ZAD | ŠIB | CZV | OLI | BOS | BUD | RAD | RAB | JUG | KVA |
|---|---|---|---|---|---|---|---|---|---|---|---|---|
| Partizan | — | 91–87 | 84–90 | 94–91 | 90–85 | 113–99 | 85–79 | 87–79 | 84–74 | 97–87 | 118–68 | 109–90 |
| Cibona | 94–95 | — | 98–86 | 94–87 | 111–92 | 103–90 | 105–87 | 90–67 | 81–61 | 115–90 | 106–87 | 120–105 |
| Zadar | 113–114 | 88–91 | — | 95–86 | 105–94 | 100–85 | 112–111 | 100–92 | 104–96 | 113–87 | 107–90 | 105–93 |
| Šibenka | 92–102 | 104–129 | 84–85 | — | 79–84 | 90–80 | 85–75 | 107–83 | 96–83 | 114–89 | 79–81 | 101–91 |
| Crvena Zvezda | 87–89 | 85–92 | 108–106 | 100–104 | — | 98–87 | 101–109 | 105–91 | 117–96 | 100–84 | 92–79 | 111–107 |
| Olimpija | 103–106 | 82–91 | 107–99 | 82–88 | 105–99 | — | 96–94 | 97–80 | 73–70 | 92–79 | 109–94 | 82–83 |
| Bosna | 104–92 | 75–77 | 106–102 | 103–93 | 97–93 | 89–91 | — | 90–67 | 103–68 | 112–93 | 108–81 | 93–90 |
| Budućnost | 69–103 | 73–79 | 90–91 | 59–64 | 106–92 | 88–78 | 85–81 | — | 85–81 | 82–76 | 80–79 | 87–73 |
| Radnički Belgrade | 117–105 | 90–83 | 86–90 | 80–84 | 99–98 | 107–86 | 95–94 | 88–89 | — | 102–97 | 109–100 | 83–88 |
| Rabotnički | 95–99 | 101–120 | 109–96 | 89–103 | 103–117 | 97–91 | 103–102 | 77–72 | 80–72 | — | 95–85 | 92–90 |
| Jugoplastika | 93–95 | 93–101 | 97–96 | 102–93 | 98–100 | 81–89 | 77–73 | 92–86 | 83–97 | 91–95 | — | 89–84 |
| Kvarner | 97–110 | 96–100 | 96–101 | 92–111 | 92–93 | 75–83 | 107–92 | 63–85 | 83–85 | 105–80 | 88–99 | — |

Source: Pearlbasket
Legend: Blue = home team win; Red = away team win.
Matches with lighter background shading were decided after overtime.

Other sources:

== Scoring leaders ==
1. Branko Skroče (Zadar) - ___ points (35.4ppg)

== Qualification in 1981-82 season European competitions ==
FIBA European Champions Cup

- Partizan (champions)

FIBA Cup Winners' Cup

- Cibona (Cup winners)

FIBA Korać Cup

- Zadar (3rd)
- Šibenka (4th)
- Crvena Zvezda (5th)
- Iskra Olimpija (6th)

== Basketball Cup ==
=== Bracket ===
Eightfinals
Bashkimi | 67
Radnički LMK Belgrade | 114
Crvena zvezda | 99
Šibenka | 92
Rabotnički | 96
Partizan | 108
Alhos Sarajevo
Cibona
TIMA Maribor | 76
Bosna | 103
Metalac | 69
Jugoplastika | 81
Lifam | 89
Slovan | 94
Primorje | 87
Kvarner | 111

Quarterfinals
Radnički LMK Belgrade | 94
Crvena zvezda | 90
Partizan | 90
Cibona | 106
Bosna | 87
Jugoplastika | 88
Slovan | 84
Kvarner | 92

Semifinals
Radnički LMK Belgrade | 93
Cibona | 111
Jugoplastika | 84
Kvarner | 91

Finals
Cibona | 112
Kvarner | 87
