= Dragana Stanković =

Serbian basketball player

No. 10 – AZS UMCS Lublin
- Position: Center
- League: Basket Liga Kobiet

Personal information
- Born: 18 January 1995 (age 31) Ljubovija, Serbia, FR Yugoslavia
- Listed height: 6 ft 5 in (1.96 m)

Career information
- WNBA draft: 2015: 3rd round, 30th overall pick
- Drafted by: San Antonio Stars
- Playing career: 2010–present

Career history
- 2010–2013: Sloboda Novi Grad
- 2013–2015: Sopron Basket
- 2015–2016: PEAC-Pécs
- 2016–2017: Hatay BŞB
- 2017–2019: Artego Bydgoszcz
- 2019–2020: Galatasaray
- 2020–2021: CCC Polkowice
- 2021–2022: USK Praha
- 2022–2023: Sopron Basket
- 2023–2024: KGHM Polkowice
- 2024–2025: Reyer Venezia
- 2025–present: AZS UMCS Lublin

Career highlights
- 2x Basket Liga Kobiet champion (2024, 2026); 3x Polish Cup winner (2018, 2023, 2024)
- Stats at Basketball Reference
Medals
Women's basketball
Representing Serbia
Olympic Games
Bronze medal – third place	2016 Rio de Janeiro	Team
EuroBasket
Bronze medal – third place	2019 Latvia/Serbia
European U18 Championship
Bronze medal – third place	2012 Romania	Team
Bronze medal – third place	2013 Croatia	Team

Dragana Stanković (Serbian Cyrillic: Драгана Станковић, born 18 January 1995) is a Serbian professional women's basketball player for AZS UMCS Lublin of the Basket Liga Kobiet and the Serbian national basketball team.

== International career ==
She represented Serbian national basketball team at the 2016 and 2020 Olympic Games.

== Achievements ==
=== National team ===
==== Junior team ====
- U18 2012 European Championship
- U18 2013 European Championship

==== Senior team ====
- 2016 Summer Olympics
- 2019 European Championship

=== Club ===
Polish Cup

- 2018, 2023

=== Individual ===
- 2019 All-EuroCup Awards – Defensive Player of the Year

== See also ==
- List of Serbian WNBA players
