= Partizan, Voronezh Oblast =

Partizan Партизан
- Settlement
- Location within Voronezh Oblast Location within Russia
- Coordinates: 51°31′N 40°04′E
- Country: Russia
- Region: Voronezh Oblast
- District: Paninsky District
- Time zone: UTC+3:00

Partizan (Russian: Партизан) is a rural locality (a settlement) in Oktyabrskoye Rural Settlement, Paninsky District, Voronezh Oblast, Russia. The population was 50 as of 2010.

== Geography ==
Partizan is located on the left bank of the Ikorets River, 22 km southwest of Panino (the district's administrative centre) by road. Toydensky is the nearest rural locality.
