= KK Profikolor =

Defunct basketball club in Pančevo, Serbia

Profikolor
- Leagues: YUBA League
- Dissolved: 1995; 31 years ago
- History: KK Profikolor
- Location: Pančevo, FR Yugoslavia
- Team colors: Blue, White and Red
- President: Živojin Uzelac (last)
| Home | Away |

Košarkaški klub Profikolor (Serbian Cyrillic: Кошаркашки клуб Профиколор), commonly referred to as KK Profikolor or KK Profi Kolor, was a men's professional basketball club based in Banatsko Novo Selo, near Pančevo, Serbia, FR Yugoslavia.

== History ==
The most successful years were from 1992 to 1994 when the club played in the YUBA League. The club placed 5th in 1992–93 season, and 4th out of 12 teams in the 1993–94 season.

== Coaches ==
- (Socialist Federal Republic of Yugoslavia) Bratislav Đorđević (1991)
- (Socialist Federal Republic of Yugoslavia) Boško Đokić (1991–1992)
- (Federal Republic of Yugoslavia) Miroslav Kanjevac (1992)
- (North Macedonia) Janko Lukovski (1992–1994)

== Notable players ==
- (Serbia and Montenegro) Milenko Topić (1991–1995)
- (Serbia and Montenegro) Dragiša Šarić (1992–1993)
- (Serbia and Montenegro) Nikola Bulatović (1993–1994)
- (Serbia and Montenegro) Dejan Radonjić (1993–1994)
- (Serbia and Montenegro) Milan Preković (1992–1994)
- (Serbia and Montenegro) Ivica Mavrenski (1992–1993)

== See also ==
- KK Dinamo Pančevo
- KK Tamiš
