= NK Partizan (disambiguation) =

NK Partizan may refer to:

- NK Partizan Žalec, Slovenian football club
- NK Partizan Slovenj Gradec, Slovenian football club

== See also ==
- FK Partizan (disambiguation)
- FC Partizan (disambiguation)
- TJ Partizán Domaniža
- Partizán Bardejov
