= KK Tamiš =

Basketball club in Pančevo, Serbia

Tamiš
- Leagues: Basketball League of Serbia
- Founded: 1992; 33 years ago
- History: KK Agropan; 1992–2000; KK Tamiš; 2000–present
- Arena: Strelište Sports Hall
- Capacity: 1,100
- Location: Pančevo, Serbia
- Team colors: Red, Blue, White
- President: Darko Jovičić
- Website: kktamis.com

Košarkaški klub Tamiš (Serbian Cyrillic: Кошаркашки клуб Тамиш), commonly referred to as KK Tamiš, is a men's professional basketball club based in Pančevo, Serbia. They are currently competing in the Basketball League of Serbia.

== History ==
The club was founded in 1992 under the name KK Agropan. In 2000, the club changed its name to KK Tamiš. They made their Basketball League of Serbia debut in the 2008–09 season.

== Sponsorship naming ==
The club has had several denominations through the years due to its sponsorship:

- Tamiš Petrohemija: 2007–2011

== Home arena ==
Tamiš plays their home games at the Strelište Sports Hall. It has a seating capacity of 1,100.

== Players ==
=== Current roster ===
Note: Flags indicate national team eligibility at FIBA-sanctioned events. Players may hold other non-FIBA nationalities not displayed.

KK Tamiš roster
Players
Coaches

Pos.	No.	Nat.	Name	Ht.	Age
PG	3	(Serbia)	Vidić, Milutin	1.90 m (6 ft 3 in)	21 – 8 January 2004
SG	4	(Serbia)	Solomun, Ivan	1.95 m (6 ft 5 in)	23 – 11 March 2002
C	5	(Serbia)	Lugić, Lazar	2.08 m (6 ft 10 in)	26 – 5 May 1998
C	6	(Georgia (country))	Bakradze, Giorgi	2.06 m (6 ft 9 in)	30 – 25 June 1994
PG	8	(Serbia)	Radović, Saša (C)	1.80 m (5 ft 11 in)	29 – 21 August 1995
F	10	(Serbia)	Šinik, Marko	1.88 m (6 ft 2 in)	26 – 11 December 1998
C	12	(Serbia)	Pavićević, Filip	2.07 m (6 ft 9 in)	25 – 1 May 1999
SG	13	(Serbia)	Strinić, Mateja	1.95 m (6 ft 5 in)	24 – 18 September 2000
PF	15	(Serbia)	Kovačević, Vasilije	2.05 m (6 ft 9 in)	24 – 11 January 2001
SF	16	(Serbia)	Smiljanić, Ivan	1.99 m (6 ft 6 in)	35 – 4 April 1989
C	26	(Serbia)	Ostojić, Goran	2.06 m (6 ft 9 in)	34 – 10 January 1991
SG	31	(Serbia)	Terzić, Branislav	1.96 m (6 ft 5 in)	27 – 22 December 1997
G/F	35	(Serbia)	Đorđević, Dimitrije	1.92 m (6 ft 4 in)	24 – 2 August 2000
C	–	(Serbia)	Todorović, Mihailo	2.10 m (6 ft 11 in)	29 – 9 July 1995
PF	–	(Serbia)	Pantović, Ognjen	2.01 m (6 ft 7 in)	28 – 3 June 1996
C	–	(Serbia)	Kojadinović, Aleksa	2.07 m (6 ft 9 in)	26 – 27 July 1998
PG	–	(United States)	Nicholas, Josh	1.90 m (6 ft 3 in)	26 – 16 August 1998

Head coach

- (Serbia) Bojan Jovičić

Assistant coach(es)

- (Serbia) Zoran Topić
- (Serbia) Lazar Dejanović

Legend

- (C) Team captain
- (L) On loan
- (TW) Two-way affiliate player
- Injured

- Roster
Updated: August 3, 2022

== Coaches ==
- (Serbia and Montenegro) Nebojša Vidić (2003–2005)
- (Serbia and Montenegro) Oliver Popović (2005–2006)
- (Serbia) Aleksandar Bućan (2006)
- (Serbia) Vojkan Benčić (2006–2007)
- (Serbia) Dragan Nikolić (2007–2009)
- (Serbia) Bojan Jovičić (2009–2021)
- (Serbia) Nebojša Vidić (2021)
- (Serbia) Bojan Jovičić (2021–present)

== Trophies and awards ==
=== Trophies ===
- Second League of Serbia (2nd-tier)
  - Winner (1): 2007–08

== Notable players ==
- (Serbia) Nenad Čanak

== See also ==
- KK Profikolor
- KK Dinamo Pančevo
