= FC Partizan =

FC Partizan may refer to:

- FC Partizan Minsk
- FC Partizan Cherven Bryag

== See also ==
- FK Partizan (disambiguation)
- NK Partizan (disambiguation)
- TJ Partizán Domaniža
- Partizán Bardejov
