= CELA Cup =

Amateur wrestling association

The European Council of Associated Wrestling Styles (CELA, French: Européen des Luttes Associées) was an association which governed wrestling styles in Europe and was part of the former FILA (French: Fédération Internationale des Luttes Associées), now United World Wrestling.

CELA organized club's competitions, such as the 1st tier European Champion Clubs' Cup and the 2nd-tier CELA Cup.

Winners
year	Champions Cup	CELA Cup
2006	Dynamo Moscow	Olympiacos
2009	Partizan	CSKA Minsk
2010	Bursa BBSK	Partizan
