= Branislav Vićentić =

Serbian basketball player and coach

Personal information
- Born: July 5, 1971 (age 55) Belgrade, SFR Yugoslavia
- Listed height: 2.04 m (6 ft 8 in)
- Listed weight: 104 kg (229 lb)

Career information
- NBA draft: 1993: undrafted
- Playing career: 1998–2007
- Position: Power forward
- Number: 7
- Coaching career: 2010–present

Career history

Playing
- 1989–1994: OKK Beograd
- 1995–1996: Bobanik
- 1996–1998: Beobanka
- 1998–2000: AZS Lublin
- 2000–2001: Lokomotiv-Kuban
- 2001–2002: UNICS
- 2002–2003: Yamolgaz '92 Yambol
- 2004–2005: CSKA Sofia
- 2005–2006: Apollon Limassol
- 2006–2007: Mega Ishrana

Coaching
- 2010–2011: Crvena zvezda (youth)
- 2011–2012: Crvena zvezda (assistant)
- 2012–2014: Mega Vizura (youth)
- 2014: Bahrain U18
- 2015–2018: Radnik Bijeljina
- 2018–2019: OKK Beograd
- 2019–2020: Liepājas
- 2020–2022: San-en NeoPhoenix
- 2022: Earthfriends Tokyo Z
- 2024: Sichuan Blue Whales

Branislav Vićentić (Serbian Cyrillic: Бранислав Вићентић; born July 5, 1971) is a Serbian basketball coach and former player.

== Playing career ==
Vićentić played for Yugoslav teams OKK Beograd, Bobanik and Beobanka. In 1998, he moved to Poland where he played for AZS Lublin for two seasons. After stint in Poland, he moved to Lokomotiv-Kuban, and later to UNICS.

In 2002, Vićentić signed for Bulgarian team Yamolgaz '92 Yambol. Later he moved to CSKA Sofia. During 2005–06 season he played for Apollon Limassol of the Cyprus League. In 2006, Vićentić came back to Serbia and spent one season playing for Mega Ishrana before retirement in March 2007.

== Coaching career ==
Vićentić was a coach for Crvena zvezda youth selections before got promoted to an assistant coach for Crvena zvezda. He coached the Mega Vizura youth selections from 2012 to 2014.

In December 2013, Vićentić was hired as the under-16 and under-18 Bahrain national team basketball coach. He left the program in August 2014

In November 2015, Vićentić signed for Bosnian team Radnik Bijeljina. He resigned in April 2018.

In June 2018, he became the head coach for OKK Beograd of the Basketball League of Serbia. OKK Beograd and Vićentić mutually parted ways after a successful season.

In June 2020, Vićentić became a head coach for San-en NeoPhoenix of the Japanese B.League.

== Career achievements ==
As player

- Yugoslav Cup winner: 1 (with OKK Beograd: 1992–93)
- Bulgarian Cup winner: 1 (with CSKA Sofia: 2004–05)
