= Josipa Bura =

Croatian female basketball player

Personal information
- Born: 3 March 1985 (age 41) Šibenik, SFR Yugoslavia
- Listed height: 1.85 m (6 ft 1 in)

Career information
- WNBA draft: 2007: undrafted
- Position: Center

Career history
- Ragusa Dubrovnik
- Studenac Omiš
- 2009–2010: Šibenik Jolly
- 2010–2011: Vojvodina
- 2011–2012: Čelik Zenica
- 2012–2013: Gospić
- 2013–2014: Novi Zagreb
- 2014–2015: Slovanka MB
- 2015–present: Sokol HK

Josipa Bura (born 3 March 1985) is a Croatian female basketball player.
