= Ivona Bogoje =

Croatian female basketball player

No. 15 – Plamen Požega
- Position: Center
- League: First League of Croatia

Personal information
- Born: 31 October 1976 (age 50) Dubrovnik, SFR Yugoslavia
- Listed height: 1.93 m (6 ft 4 in)

Career information
- WNBA draft: 1998: undrafted

Career history
- 1996–2000: Croatia Zagreb
- 2002–2003: Gospić
- 2003–2004: Univerziteti Priština
- 2004–2006: Šibenik Jolly
- 2006–2007: Maddaloni Basket
- 2007–2008: Arranz-Jopisa Burgos
- 2008: Ragusa Dubrovnik
- 2008: Mann Filter Zaragoza
- 2008–2009: Challes-les-Eaux Basket
- 2009–2010: Gospić
- 2010–2012: Mladi Krajišnik
- 2012–2013: Čelik Zenica
- 2013: Partizan
- 2013–2014: CB Conquero
- 2014–2015: Ragusa Dubrovnik
- 2015: CUS Cagliari
- 2015–2016: Energa Toruń
- 2016–present: Plamen Požega

Ivona Bogoje (born 31 October 1976 in Dubrovnik, SFR Yugoslavia) is a Croatian female basketball player.
