= Vizura Sports Center =

Basketball hall in Belgrade, Serbia

Vizura Sport Center
- Визура Спортски Центар
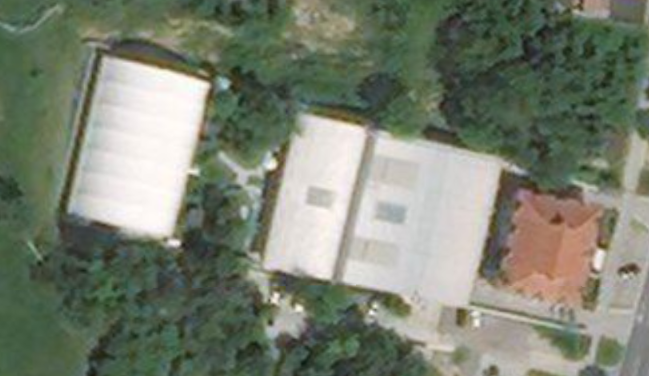

- Location within Belgrade
- Address: Tošin Bunar 224 A
- Location: Belgrade, Serbia
- Coordinates: 44.819955°N 20.394924°E
- Capacity: 1,500

Construction
- Opened: 2002
- Demolished: 2023

Tenants
- KK Mladost Zemun; KK Beovuk 72; ŽKK Partizan Galenika

Vizura Sport Center was an indoor sports arena in Belgrade, Serbia.

Built in 2002 and located in the New Belgrade municipality on Tošin Bunar Street, it has a seating capacity for 1,500. The arena is licensed for professional basketball, volleyball and table tennis. It is the home arena of basketball clubs KK Mega Vizura.

The arena was demolished in 2023.

== See also ==
- List of indoor arenas in Serbia
