= ŽKK Sloboda Novi Grad =

- Leagues: Bosnian First League
- Founded: 1980
- Arena: SD Novi Grad (capacity: 800)
- Location: Novi Grad, Bosnia and Herzegovina
- Team colors: Red, Yellow and Blue
- President: Zoran Starčević
- Head coach: Sunčica Marčeta

ŽKK Sloboda Novi Grad is a women's basketball club from Novi Grad, Bosnia and Herzegovina.

== Honours ==
=== Domestic ===
National Cups – 0

- Bosnian Cup
  - Runners-up (1) : 2013
