= 2012–13 Basketball Championship of Bosnia and Herzegovina =

2012–2013 Basketball Championship of Bosnia and Herzegovina season
- League: Basketball Championship of Bosnia and Herzegovina
- Sport: Basketball
- Duration: 20 October 2012 – 23 March 2013 (regular season)
- Teams: Bosnia and Herzegovina (12 teams)
- TV partner(s): BHT 1 RTRS

Regular Season
- Season champions: Mladost
- Season MVP: (Bosnia and Herzegovina) Amin Hot (Vogošća)
- Top scorer: (Bosnia and Herzegovina) Mujo Tuljković (Vogošća)

Liga 6
- Season champions: Igokea
- Season MVP: (Bosnia and Herzegovina) Filip Goranović (Radnik BN Basket)
- Top scorer: (Bosnia and Herzegovina) Filip Goranović (Radnik BN Basket)

Playoff stage
- Finals champions: Igokea
- Runners-up: Široki WWin

Premijer liga BiH seasons
- ← 2011–12 2013–14

The 2012–2013 Basketball Championship of Bosnia and Herzegovina is the 12th season of the Basketball Championship of Bosnia and Herzegovina, with 12 teams from Bosnia participating in it.

Regular season will start on October 20, 2012, and it will last until March 23, 2013.

== Current season teams (2012–2013) ==
Team	City	Venue (Capacity)
KK Sloboda Tuzla	Tuzla	Javno preduzeće SKPC Velika dvorana Mejdan (6,000)
Borac Banja Luka	Banja Luka	Javna ustanova Sportski centar Borik (4,260)
KK Bosna	Sarajevo	Olimpijska dvorana Ramiz Salčin Mojmilo (1,299)
HKK Posušje	Posušje	Sportska dvorana Posušje (1,000)
KK Leotar	Trebinje	Sportska dvorana Miloš Mrdić (2,000)
HKK Čapljina Lasta	Čapljina	Sportska dvorana Čapljina (2,000)
KK Varda Višegrad	Višegrad	Sportska dvorana Višegrad (1,000)
KK Servitium	Gradiška	Sportski centar Nenad Baštinac (2,500)
KK Mladost Mrkonjić Grad	Mrkonjić Grad	Arena Komercijalna banka AD (2,000)
KK Radnik Bijeljina	Bijeljina	Sala Osnovne škole Vuk Karadžić (2,000)
KK Kakanj	Kakanj	Sportska dvorana Kakanj (1,300)
HKK Zrinjski Mostar	Mostar	Školska dvorana Bijeli Brijeg (1,000)
KK Vogošća	Vogošća	Javna ustanova KSC Sportska dvorana Amel Bečković (3,000)

== Locations ==
Location of clubs in 2012–13 Premijer ligi BiH

== Regular season ==
=== Standings ===
	Team	Pld	W	L	PF	PA	Diff	Pts
1	KK Mladost Mrkonjić Grad	22	17	5	1716	1511	+205	39
2	KK Bosna	22	16	6	1833	1649	+184	38
3	HKK Čapljina Lasta	22	16	6	1645	1518	+127	38
4	KK Radnik Bijeljina	22	11	11	1596	1560	+36	33
5	HKK Zrinjski Mostar	22	11	11	1710	1700	+10	33
6	KK Varda Višegrad	22	10	12	1589	1615	–26	32
7	KK Leotar	22	10	12	1631	1648	–17	32
8	KK Kakanj	22	9	13	1647	1744	–97	31
9	HKK Posušje	22	9	13	1614	1642	–28	31
10	Borac Banja Luka	22	9	13	1600	1628	–28	31
11	KK Vogošća	22	8	14	1758	1826	–68	30
12	KK Servitium	22	6	16	1375	11673	–175	28

Qualified for Liga 6
Relegation to Prva liga RS or Prva liga FBiH

Pld – Played; W – Won; L – Lost; PF – Points for; PA – Points against; Diff – Difference; Pts – Points. As of 18 May 2013

=== Schedule and results ===
1. round
Zrinjski – Mladost	63-58
Vogošća – Posušje	85-81
Čapljina – Bosna	83-80
Borac – Varda HE	75-74
Leotar – Kakanj	83-69
Radnik – Servitium	72-44

2. round
Mladost – Borac	68-66
Čapljina – Radnik	78-66
Varda HE – Leotar	78-70
Kakanj – Vogošća	90-80
Bosna – Posušje	88-73
Servitium – Zrinjski	75-74

3. round
Zrinjski – Čapljina	58-63
Vogošća – Varda HE	75-93
Radnik – Bosna	77-76
Leotar – Mladost	82-84 OT
Borac – Servitium	71-63
Posušje – Kakanj	90-57

4. round
Bosna – Kakanj	94-75
Čapljina – Borac	79-62
Mladost – Vogošća	88-66
Radnik – Zrinjski	77-66
Varda HE – Posušje	85-79
Servitium – Zrinjski	79-75

5. round
Zrinjski – Bosna	82-76
Kakanj – Varda HE	77-56
Leotar – Čapljina	87-68
Posušje – Mladost	53-84
Vogošća – Servitium	81-75
Borac – Radnik	71-64

6. round
Zrinjski – Borac	78-81
Radnik – Leotar	67-65
Čapljina – Vogošća	93-78
Mladost – Kakanj	83-72
Bosna – Varda HE	95-82
Servitium – Posušje	0-20

7. round
Leotar – Zrinjski	91-80
Borac – Bosna	77-83
Vogošća – Radnik	76-78
Kakanj – Servitium	89-74
Posušje – Čapljina	61-70
Varda HE – Mladost	69-79

8. round
Bosna – Mladost	82-81
Servitium – Varda HE	87-81
Radnik – Posušje	77-64
Čapljina – Kakanj	76-60
Zrinjski – Vogošća	110-102
Borac – Leotar	85-66

9. round
Leotar – Bosna	82-94
Vogošća – Borac	80-69
Kakanj – Radnik	93-85
Posušje – Zrinjski	83-81
Mladost – Servitium	71-67
Varda HE – Čapljina	86-78

10. round
Bosna – Servitium	76-70
Radnik – Varda HE	72-56
Borac – Posušje	100-95
Leotar – Vogošća	80-85
Čapljina – Mladost	69-59
Zrinjski – Kakanj	86-80

11. round
Varda HE – Zrinjski	75-80
Kakanj – Borac	77-75
Posušje – Leotar	83-76
Vogošća – Bosna	86-94
Servitium – Čapljina	64-77
Mladost – Radnik	87-73

12. round
Bosna – Čapljina	94-72
Varda HE – Borac	71-53
Servitium – Radnik	67-66
Mladost – Zrinjski	100-85
Posušje – Vogošća	88-81
Kakanj – Leotar	75-85

13. round
Posušje – Bosna	60-58
Leotar – Varda HE	65-62
Radnik – Čapljina	71-59
Vogošća – Kakanj	105-70
Borac – Mladost	69-80
Zrinjski – Servitium	66-76

14. round
Čapljina – Zrinjski	83-60
Mladost – Leotar	55-57
Varda HE – Vogošća	71-64
Kakanj – Posušje	90-72
Bosna – Radnik	85-77
Servitium – Borac	64-70

15. round
Kakanj – Bosna	63-75
Posušje – Varda HE	72-76
Vogošća – Mladost	60-73
Zrinjski – Radnik	75-68
Borac – Čapljina	73-62
Leotar – Servitium	87-58

16. round
Bosna – Zrinjski	84-82
Servitium – Vogošća	70-84
Radnik – Borac	73-69
Čapljina – Leotar	61-41
Mladost – Posušje	70-65
Varda HE – Kakanj	79-74

17. round
Borac – Zrinjski	69-77
Kakanj – Mladost	76-73
Posušje – Servitium	92-52
Varda HE – Bosna	78-69
Vogošća – Čapljina	82-94
Leotar – Radnik	88-86

18. round
Zrinjski – Leotar	72-54
Servitium – Kakanj	75-69
Mladost – Varda HE	77-59
Bosna – Borac	78-69
Radnik – Vogošća	85-71
Čapljina – Posušje	81-71

19. round
Mladost – Bosna	98-92 OT
Kakanj – Čapljina	64-77
Posušje – Radnik	81-67
Varda HE – Servitium	83-58
Leotar – Borac	73-62
Vogošća – Zrinjski	94-89 OT

20. round
Bosna – Leotar	82-51
Borac – Vogošća	81-68
Zrinjski – Posušje	89-76
Čapljina – Varda HE	74-67
Sevitium – Mladost	45-98
Radnik – Kakanj	67-79

21. round
Kakanj – Zrinjski	72-79
Servitium – Bosna	63-100
Mladost – Čapljina	83-79
Varda HE – Radnik	45-64
Vogošća – Leotar	87-76
Posušje – Borac	79-78

22. round
Leotar – Posušje	97-76
Bosna – Vogošća	78-68
Zrinjski – Varda HE	78-63
Borac – Kakanj	75-76
Radnik – Mladost	64-65
Čapljina – Servitium	76-66

== Liga 6 ==
=== Standings ===
Pos	Team	Total						
		P	W	L	F	A	D	Pts
1	Igokea	10	9	1	854	611	243	19
2	Široki WWin	10	9	1	795	650	145	19
3	Mladost MG	10	5	5	728	747	-19	15
4	Bosna BH Telekom	10	3	7	635	748	-113	13
5	Radnik BN Basket	10	3	7	688	805	-117	13
6	Čapljina Lasta	10	1	9	625	764	-139	11

P=Matches played, W=Matches won, L=Matches lost, F=Points for, A=Points against, D=Points difference, Pts=Points

Qualification for Playoff Stage

As of 18 May 2013

=== Schedule and results ===
	BOS	ČAP	IGO	MLA	RAD	ŠIR
Bosna BH Telekom		69–67	58–90	70–59	81–72	49–73
Čapljina Lasta	76–67		61–73	71–84	66–68	64–71
Igokea	76–50	100–38		87–68	100–70	80–64
Mladost MG	66–61	80–55	62–92		89–61	74–75
Radnik BN Basket	74–70	76–66	55–79	86–87		60–82
Široki WWin	95–60	76–61	85–77	89–59	85–66	

== Playoff stage ==
=== Semifinals ===
Game 1

10. May 2013.
20:00

Igokea	82–44	Bosna
Scoring by quarter: 25 – 10, 18 – 12, 15 – 11, 24 – 11
Pts: Radukić 15; Rebs: Two players 5 Asts: Two players 5		Pts: S. Demić 13; Rebs: Rizvić 7 Asts: Rizvić 2
Igokea leads 1–0

SC Nenad Baštinac
Laktaši, Bosnia

11. May 2013.
20:00

Široki WWin	81–67	Mladost
Scoring by quarter: 26 – 22, 13 – 15, 18 – 16, 24 – 14
Pts: Barać 21; Rebs: Šakić 12; Asts: Jones 5		Pts: Bijelić 23; Rebs: Bijelić 9 Asts: Ivanić 3
Široki WWin leads 1–0

GSD Pecara
Široki Brijeg, Bosnia

Game 2

14. May 2013.
19:00

Bosna	58–86	Igokea
Scoring by quarter: 21 – 21, 10 – 15, 10 – 28, 17 – 22
Pts: Buza 19; Rebs: Buza 6 Asts: Two players 2		Pts: Štemberger 17; Rebs: Three players 3 Asts: Bocka 5
Igokea won 2–0

Mala dvorana Mirza Delibašić KSC Skenderija
Sarajevo, Bosnia

14. May 2013.
20:00

Mladost	53–70	Široki WWin
Scoring by quarter: 6 – 25, 20 – 15, 9 – 16, 18 – 14
Pts: Bijelić 15; Rebs: Bijelić 6 Asts: Two players 2		Pts: Šakić 16; Rebs: Ramljak 7 Asts: Šakić 4
Široki WWin won 2–0

Arena Komercijalne banke AD
Mrkonjić Grad, Bosnia

=== Final ===
Game 1

21. May 2013.
20:30

Report

Igokea	69–61	Široki WWin
Scoring by quarter: 22 – 12, 8 – 12, 19 – 14, 20 – 23
Pts: Komatina 13; Rebs: Radukić 6 Asts: Hammonds 9		Pts: Šakić 16; Rebs: Šakić 10; Asts: Two players 3
Igokea leads 1–0

Sportski centar Nenad Baštinac
Laktaši, Bosnia
Attendance: 1500
Referees: Petar Obradović, Haris Bijedić, Dragan Kralj

Game 2

25. May 2013.
17:00

Široki WWin	72–71	Igokea
Scoring by quarter: 30 – 19, 12 – 16, 17 – 20, 13 – 16
Pts: 18		Pts: Adamović 14

Gradska sportska dvorana Pecara
Široki Brijeg, Bosnia
Attendance: 2300

=== Bracket ===
Semifinals
1	Igokea	2
4	Bosna	0
2	Široki WWin	2
3	Mladost	0

Final
1	Igokea	3
2	Široki WWin	2

2012–13 Basketball Championship of Bosnia and Herzegovina Champions

== Stats leaders ==
As of 24 March 2013

=== Points ===
Rank	Name	Team	Points	Games	PPG
1.	(Bosnia and Herzegovina) Mujo Tuljković	Vogošća	310	13	23.8
2.	(Croatia) Ivan Baković	Posušje	474	21	22.6
3.	(Montenegro) Boris Lalović	Zrinjski	451	22	20.5
4.	(Bosnia and Herzegovina) Mario Filipović	Vogošća	259	13	19.9
5.	(Bosnia and Herzegovina) Sead Hadžifejzović	Kakanj	329	19	17.3

=== Rebounds ===
Rank	Name	Team	Rebounds	Games	RPG
1.	(Bosnia and Herzegovina) Mujo Tuljković	Vogošća	122	13	9.4
2.	(Serbia) Marko Jošilo	Varda	188	21	9.0
3.	(Montenegro) Boris Lalović	Zrinjski	182	22	8.3
4.	(Bosnia and Herzegovina) Filip Goranović	Radnik BN Basket	141	20	7.1
5.	(Bosnia and Herzegovina) Nebojša Pavlović	Borac Banja Luka	148	21	7.0

=== Assists ===
Rank	Name	Team	Assists	Games	APG
1.	(Bosnia and Herzegovina) Amin Hot	Vogošća	157	22	7.1
2.	(Bosnia and Herzegovina) Dinko Peljto	Kakanj	114	20	5.7
3.	(Bosnia and Herzegovina) Edi Sinadinović	Zrinjski	62	12	5.2
4.	(Serbia) Nemanja Kovačević	Čapljina Lasta	107	22	4.9
5.	(Croatia) Ivan Baković	Posušje	100	21	4.8

=== Ranking MVP ===
Rank	Name	Team	Efficiency	Games	Average
1.	(Bosnia and Herzegovina) Amin Hot	Vogošća	566	22	25.7
2.	(Montenegro) Boris Lalović	Zrinjski	562	22	25.5
3.	(Bosnia and Herzegovina) Mujo Tuljković	Vogošća	326	13	25.1
4.	(Croatia) Ivan Baković	Posušje	428	21	23.8
5.	(Bosnia and Herzegovina) Ramo Rizvić	Bosna	481	22	21.9

=== MVP Round by Round ===
Liga 12

Round	Player	Team	Efficiency
1	(Bosnia and Herzegovina) Amin Hot	Vogošća	43
2	(Bosnia and Herzegovina) Nemanja Knežević	Leotar	44
3	(Serbia) Đorđe Tresač	Varda	43
4	(Bosnia and Herzegovina) Božo Đurasović	Leotar	38
5	(Montenegro) Igor Bijelić	Mladost	21
6	(Bosnia and Herzegovina) Sead Hadžifejzović	Kakanj	39
7	(Bosnia and Herzegovina) Sead Hadžifejzović (2)	Kakanj	43
8	(Montenegro) Igor Bijelić (2)	Mladost	39
9	(Bosnia and Herzegovina) Amin Hot (2)	Vogošća	47
10	(Montenegro) Boris Lalović	Zrinjski	45
11	(Bosnia and Herzegovina) Ivan Begić	Posušje	35
12	(Bosnia and Herzegovina) Mujo Tuljković	Vogošća	36
13	(Montenegro) Boris Lalović (2)	Zrinjski	51
14	(Bosnia and Herzegovina) Nebojša Pavlović	Borac Banja Luka	41
15	(Montenegro) Boris Lalović (3)	Zrinjski	33
16	(Montenegro) Boris Lalović (4)	Zrinjski	35
17	(Croatia) Ivan Baković	Posušje	31
18	(Bosnia and Herzegovina) Ramo Rizvić	Bosna	41
19	(Bosnia and Herzegovina) Mario Filipović	Vogošća	48
20	(Croatia) Ivan Baković (2)	Posušje	39
21	(Montenegro) Boris Lalović (5)	Zrinjski	35
22	(Montenegro) Boris Lalović (6)	Zrinjski	31

Liga 6

Round	Player	Team	Efficiency
1	(United States) Rashaun Freeman	Široki WWin	33
2	(Croatia) Željko Šakić	Široki WWin	36
3	(Bosnia and Herzegovina) Draško Knežević	Mladost	35
4	(Serbia) Krsto Bjelica	Čapljina Lasta	33
5	(Serbia) Nemanja Kovačević	Čapljina Lasta	27
6	(Bosnia and Herzegovina) Filip Goranović	Radnik BN Basket	35
7	(Serbia) Nemanja Kovačević (2)	Čapljina Lasta	35
8	(Bosnia and Herzegovina) Filip Goranović	Radnik BN Basket	25
9	(Montenegro) Novak Popović	Čapljina Lasta	30
10	(Bosnia and Herzegovina) Filip Goranović (2)	Radnik BN Basket	29

Play off

Round	Player	Team	Efficiency
1	(Bosnia and Herzegovina) —	—	?
