= 2021–22 Basketball Championship of Bosnia and Herzegovina =

Prvenstvo BiH
- Season: 2021–22
- Teams: 14

Finals
- Champions: Igokea
- Runners-up: Široki

The 2021–22 Basketball Championship of Bosnia and Herzegovina was 21st season of this championship, with 14 teams from Bosnia and Herzegovina participating in it. HKK Široki is the defending champion.

== Competition format ==
Thirteen of fourteen teams joined the regular season, playing with as double round-robin tournament.

The first five teams joined "Liga 6" along with KK Igokea. The last three teams should have been relegated, however KK Bosna and KK Zrinjski remained in the league.

Playoffs will not be played and team which ends on first place in Liga 6 will be the champion.

=== Distribution ===
The following is the access list for this season.

Access list for 2021–22 Championship of Bosnia and Herzegovina
	Teams entering in this round	Teams advancing from the previous round
Regular season (13 teams)	11 highest-placed teams from the last season; 3 teams from three 2nd-tier leagues	
Liga 6 (6 teams)	1 Adriatic League team (Igokea)	5 highest-placed teams from the Regular season

== Teams and locations ==
=== Pre-season controversy ===
In June 2021, at the end of the 2020-21 season, Igokea, Borac and Spars did not show up to the final tournament due to the disagreements with competition system and schedule. As a result, the title was awarded to Široki as a walkover and Igokea, Borac and Spars were fined, and initially relegated to a lower-tier competition. On 5 October 2021 the drew was held with 11 participating teams. The championship officially began on October 16, but three matches were cancelled because teams from Republika Srpska boycotted the competition because of board's decisions made in June.

On 19 October the board of the league after appeals decided that Igokea, Borac and Spars will be fined, but not relegated. New draw was held and competition continued with 14 teams instead of 11.

=== Promotion and relegation ===
Radnik Bijeljina and Posušje were promoted, while Kakanj was relegated. Čapljina Lasta withdrew due to the financial difficulties.

Locations of the 2021–22 Basketball Championship of Bosnia and Herzegovina teams

Team	City	Venue
Borac	Banja Luka	Borik Sports Hall
Bosna Royal	Sarajevo	Mirza Delibašić Hall
Bratunac	Bratunac	Bratunac Sports Hall
Igokea	Laktaši	Laktaši Sports Hall
Leotar	Trebinje	Miloš Mrdić Sports Hall
Mladost	Mrkonjić Grad	Komercijalna banka Arena
Posušje	Posušje	GSD Posušje
Promo DV	Donji Vakuf	Donji Vakuf Sports Hall
Radnik	Bijeljina	SD Vuk Karadžić
Spars	Sarajevo	Novo Sarajevo Sports Hall
Sloboda	Tuzla	SKPC Mejdan
Čelik	Zenica	Zenica City Arena
Široki	Široki Brijeg	Pecara Sports Hall
Zrinjski	Mostar	Bijeli Brijeg Sports Hall

Teams that play in the 2021–22 Adriatic League First Division
Teams that play in the 2021–22 Adriatic League Second Division

== Regular season ==
=== Standings ===
Pos	Team	Pld	W	L	GF	GA	GD	Pts	
1	Široki	23	19	4	2145	1725	+420	42	Qualification for the ABA 2 league and Liga 6
2	Sloboda Tuzla	23	18	5	1887	1607	+280	41	Qualification for the Liga 6
3	Borac Banja Luka	23	17	6	1933	1634	+299	40	Qualification for the Liga 6
4	Leotar	23	17	6	1910	1751	+159	40	Qualification for the Liga 6
5	Spars	23	16	7	1926	1653	+273	39	Qualification for the Liga 6
6	Posušje	23	10	13	1719	1807	−88	33	
7	Promo	23	10	13	1845	1966	−121	33	
8	Mladost Mrkonjić Grad	23	9	14	1807	1985	−178	32	
9	Bratunac	23	9	14	1843	2068	−225	32	
10	Radnik	23	7	16	1651	1919	−268	30	
11	Zrinjski	23	6	17	1698	1794	−96	29	
12	Bosna Royal	23	5	18	1770	2054	−284	28	
13	Čelik	12	1	11	736	907	−171	13	Withdrew

Source: Basketball Federation of BiH

== Liga 6 ==
Pos	Team	Pld	W	L	GF	GA	GD	Pts	Qualification
1	Igokea	10	8	2	822	673	+149	18	Champions
2	Široki	10	7	3	844	732	+112	17	Qualification for the ABA 2 league
3	Spars Sarajevo	10	5	5	784	847	−63	15	Qualification for the ABA 2 league
4	Leotar	10	4	6	801	863	−62	14	
5	Borac Banja Luka	10	4	6	680	761	−81	14	
6	Sloboda Tuzla	10	2	8	754	809	−55	12	

Source: Basketball Federation of BiH

== Clubs in European competitions ==
Team	Competition	Progress
Igokea	Champions League	Regular season
