= 2020–21 Basketball Championship of Bosnia and Herzegovina =

Prvenstvo BiH
- Season: 2020–21
- Teams: 14

Finals
- Champions: Široki (11th title)

The 2020–21 Basketball Championship of Bosnia and Herzegovina was the 20th season of this championship, with 14 teams from Bosnia and Herzegovina participating in it. Igokea was the defending champion.

== Competition format ==
Thirteen of fourteen teams joined the regular season, played with as double round-robin tournament.

At the end of regular season the last three teams would be relegated, while the first five teams would join "Liga 6" along with KK Igokea. First four teams in "Liga 6" would compete in playoff tournament, with one-leg (semifinals, third place and final) matches.

In mid-season, however, it was decided that only the last team will be relegated. Also, playoff semifinal and final will be played in best of three and best of five format, respectively.

=== Distribution ===
The following is the access list for this season.

Access list for 2020–21 Championship of Bosnia and Herzegovina
	Teams entering in this round	Teams advancing from the previous round
Regular season (13 teams)	10 highest-placed teams from the last season; 3 teams from three 2nd-tier leagues	
Liga 6 (6 teams)	1 Adriatic League team (Igokea)	5 highest-placed teams from the Regular season
Playoffs (4 teams)		4 highest-placed teams from the Liga 6

== Teams and locations ==
Locations of the 2020–21 Basketball Championship of Bosnia and Herzegovina teams

Bosna Royal, Borac Banja Luka and Čelik Zenica were promoted, while Vogošća was relegated.

Team	City	Venue
Borac	Banja Luka	Borik Sports Hall
Bosna Royal	Sarajevo	Mirza Delibašić Hall
Bratunac	Bratunac	Bratunac Sports Hall
Čapljina Lasta	Čapljina	Čapljina Sports Hall
Igokea	Laktaši	Laktaši Sports Hall
Kakanj	Kakanj	KSC Kakanj Sports Hall
Leotar	Trebinje	Miloš Mrdić Sports Hall
Mladost	Mrkonjić Grad	Komercijalna banka Arena
Promo DV	Donji Vakuf	Donji Vakuf Sports Hall
Spars	Sarajevo	Novo Sarajevo Sports Hall
Sloboda	Tuzla	SKPC Mejdan
Čelik	Zenica	Zenica City Arena
Široki	Široki Brijeg	Pecara Sports Hall
Zrinjski	Mostar	Bijeli Brijeg Sports Hall

Teams that play in the 2020–21 Adriatic League First Division
Teams that play in the 2020–21 Adriatic League Second Division

== Regular season ==
=== Standings ===
Pos	Team	Pld	W	L	GF	GA	GD	Pts	Relegation
1	Široki	24	17	7	1946	1747	+199	41	Qualification for the Liga 6
2	Spars	23	17	6	1968	1716	+252	40	Qualification for the Liga 6
3	Čelik	24	15	9	1952	1836	+116	39	Qualification for the Liga 6
4	Borac Banja Luka	24	14	10	1999	1929	+70	38	Qualification for the Liga 6
5	Leotar	24	14	10	2031	1989	+42	38	Qualification for the Liga 6
6	Sloboda Tuzla	24	13	11	2015	1972	+43	37	
7	Mladost Mrkonjić Grad	24	12	12	1935	1887	+48	36	
8	Promo	24	11	13	1833	1888	−55	35	
9	Bosna Royal	24	10	14	1865	1888	−23	34	
10	Zrinjski	24	10	14	1941	2042	−101	34	
11	Čapljina Lasta	24	10	14	1929	2030	−101	34	
12	Bratunac	23	8	15	1698	1819	−121	31	
13	Kakanj	24	4	20	1810	2179	−369	28	Relegation

Source: Basketball Federation of BiH

== Liga 6 ==
Pos	Team	Pld	W	L	GF	GA	GD	Pts	Qualification
1	Igokea	10	10	0	883	695	+188	20	Relegated
2	Borac Banja Luka	10	7	3	826	766	+60	17	Relegated
3	Spars Sarajevo	10	5	5	761	780	−19	15	Relegated
4	Široki	10	3	7	790	842	−52	13	Champions
5	Leotar	10	3	7	770	848	−78	13	
6	Čelik	10	2	8	668	767	−99	12	

Source: Basketball Federation of BiH

== Playoffs ==
Igokea, which was supposed to host the Final Four, canceled the organization of this tournament, and the Basketball Association of BiH awarded the organization to Široki. Igokea, Borac and Spars did not show up to the final tournament, and as a result the title was awarded to Široki as a walkover.

Igokea, Borac and Spars were fined, and relegated to a lower-tier competition.

== Clubs in European competitions ==
Team	Competition	Progress
Igokea	Champions League	Top 16
