= 2011–12 Basketball Championship of Bosnia and Herzegovina =

2011–12 Basketball Championship of Bosnia and Herzegovina season
- League: Basketball Championship of Bosnia and Herzegovina
- Sport: Basketball
- Duration: 15 October 2011 – 17 March 2012 (regular season)
- Teams: Bosnia and Herzegovina (12 teams)
- TV partner(s): BHT 1 RTRS

Regular Season

Liga 6

Playoff stage

Premijer liga BiH seasons
- ← 2010–11 2012–13 →

The 2011–12 Basketball Championship of Bosnia and Herzegovina is the 11th season of the Basketball Championship of Bosnia and Herzegovina, with 13 teams from Bosnia participating in it.

Regular season will start on October 15, 2011, and it will last until March 17, 2012.

== 2011-12 teams ==
Team	City	Venue (Capacity)
Borac Banja Luka	Banja Luka	Javna ustanova Sportski centar Borik (4,260)
KK Bosna	Sarajevo	Mala dvorana Mirza Delibašić KSC Skenderija (800)
Hercegovac	Bileća	Sportska dvorana Bileća
KK Leotar	Trebinje	Sportska dvorana Bregovi (2,000)
HKK Čapljina Lasta	Čapljina	Sportska dvorana Čapljina (2,000)
KK Varda Višegrad	Višegrad	Sportska dvorana Višegrad (1,000)
KK Servitium	Gradiška, Bosnia and Herzegovina	Sportski centar Nenad Baštinac (2,500)
KK Mladost Mrkonjić Grad	Mrkonjić Grad	Arena Komercijalna banka AD (2,000)
HKK Brotnjo	Čitluk, Bosnia and Herzegovina	Sportska dvorana Čitluk (1,000)
KK Kakanj	Kakanj	Sportska dvorana Kakanj (1,300)
HKK Zrinjski Mostar	Mostar	Školska dvorana Bijeli Brijeg (1,000)
KK Vogošća	Vogošća	Javna ustanova KSC Sportska dvorana Amel Bečković (3,000)
