= 2015–16 Basketball Championship of Bosnia and Herzegovina =

Prvenstva BiH
- Teams: 13

Regular season
- Relegated: BN Basket; Student Mostar; Varda

Finals
- Champions: Igokea (5th title)
- Runners-up: Kakanj

The 2015–16 Basketball Championship of Bosnia and Herzegovina was the 15th season of this championship, with 13 teams from Bosnia and Herzegovina participating in it. Igokea won its fifth title on 12 May 2016, when it beat Kakanj 3–1 in the Finals.

== Regular season ==
Pos	Team	Pld	W	L	GF	GA	GD	Pts	Qualification or relegation
1	Kakanj	22	17	5	1714	1550	+164	39	Advance to Liga 6
2	Swisslion Leotar	22	15	7	1694	1551	+143	37	Advance to Liga 6
3	Mladost	22	15	7	1805	1720	+85	37	Advance to Liga 6
4	Spars Sarajevo	22	15	7	1666	1613	+53	37	Advance to Liga 6
5	Široki	22	13	9	1755	1650	+105	35	Advance to Liga 6
6	Student Mostar	22	11	11	1653	1604	+49	33	Advance to Relegation stage
7	Sloboda Tuzla	22	10	12	1710	1704	+6	32	Advance to Relegation stage
8	Bošnjak	22	9	13	1662	1764	−102	31	Advance to Relegation stage
9	Zrinjski Mostar	22	8	14	1647	1653	−6	30	Advance to Relegation stage
10	Građanski	22	8	14	1559	1706	−147	30	Advance to Relegation stage
11	BN Basket	22	6	16	1579	1733	−154	28	Advance to Relegation stage
12	Varda	22	5	17	1531	1727	−196	27	Relegation

Source: FIBA

== Second stage ==
=== Liga 6 ===
Pos	Team	Pld	W	L	GF	GA	GD	Pts	Qualification
1	Igokea	10	10	0	819	603	+216	20	Advance to playoffs
2	Mladost	10	5	5	750	793	−43	15	Advance to playoffs
3	Kakanj	10	5	5	711	759	−48	15	Advance to playoffs
4	Swisslion Leotar	10	4	6	725	732	−7	14	Advance to playoffs
5	Široki	10	3	7	724	776	−52	13	
6	Spars Sarajevo	10	3	7	671	737	−66	13	

Source: Flashscore

=== Relegation group ===
Pos	Team	Pld	W	L	GF	GA	GD	Pts	Relegation
1	Zrinjski Mostar	20	12	8	1508	1416	+92	32	
2	Sloboda Tuzla	20	11	9	1577	1527	+50	31	
3	Bošnjak	20	11	9	1537	1521	+16	31	
4	Građanski	20	10	10	1496	1497	−1	30	
5	Student Mostar	20	8	12	1497	1546	−49	28	Relegation
6	BN Basket	20	7	13	1403	1511	−108	27	Relegation

Source: Flashscore

== Playoffs ==
Semifinals
1	Igokea	2
4	Swisslion Leotar	0
2	Mladost	1
3	Kakanj	2

Finals
1	Igokea	3
3	Kakanj	1
