= Dalibor Ilić =

Serbian basketball player

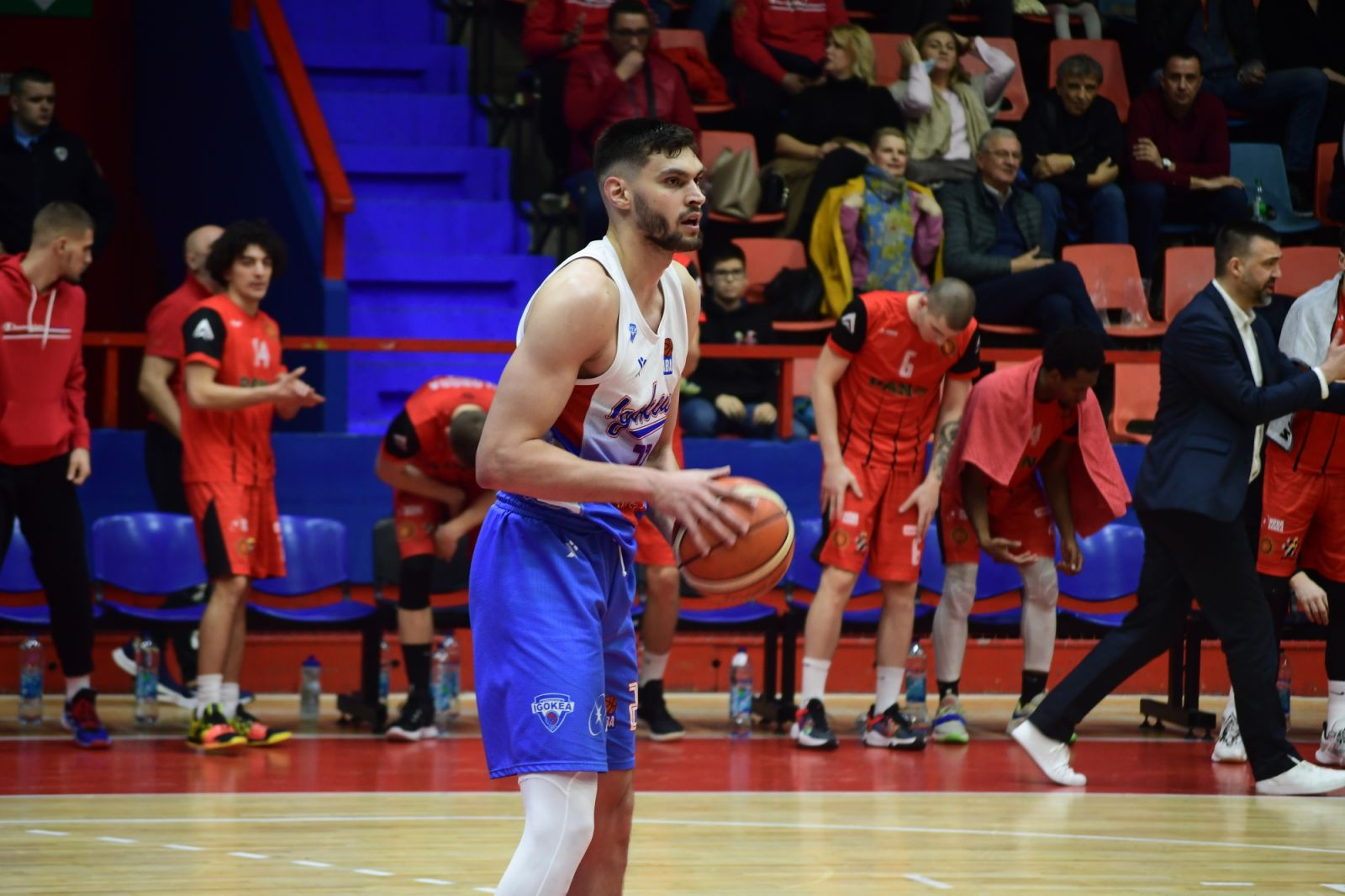
- Ilić with Igokea in April 2022.

No. 22 – Spartak Subotica
- Position: Center / power forward
- League: Serbian SuperLeague; ABA League; FIBA Champions League

Personal information
- Born: 4 March 2000 (age 26) Višegrad, Republika Srpska, Bosnia and Herzegovina
- Listed height: 2.06 m (6 ft 9 in)
- Listed weight: 94 kg (207 lb)

Career information
- NBA draft: 2022: undrafted
- Playing career: 2016–present

Career history
- 2016–2022: Igokea
- 2019: →Mega Bemax
- 2022–2026: Crvena zvezda
- 2024–2026: →Spartak Subotica
- 2026–present: Spartak Subotica

Career highlights
- ABA League champion (2024); 3× Bosnian League champion (2017, 2020, 2022); 3× Serbian League champion (2023, 2024, 2026); 5× Bosnian Cup winner (2017–2019, 2021, 2022); 2× Serbian Cup winner (2023, 2024); 2× All-Junior Adriatic League Team (2018, 2019)
Medals
Men's basketball
Representing Serbia
FIBA Europe Under-18 Championship
Gold medal – first place	2018 Latvia	U18 Team

Dalibor Ilić (Serbian Cyrillic: Далибор Илић; born 4 March 2000) is a Serbian professional basketball player for Spartak Subotica of the Serbian SuperLeague, the ABA League, and the FIBA Champions League.

== Early career ==
Born in Višegrad, Republika Srpska, Bosnia and Herzegovina, Ilić started to play basketball for youth system of his hometown team Varda. In 2015, he joined youth teams of Igokea from Aleksandrovac. He won the third place at the 2017–18 Junior ABA League season with the Igokea U19 team. Over six season games, he averaged 20.8 points, 10.7 rebounds and 3.5 assists per game. Ilić won the third place at the 2018–19 Junior ABA League season with the Igokea U19 team. Over six season games, he averaged 26.7 points, 16.8 rebounds and 2.8 assists per game.

== Professional career ==
In 2016, Ilić was promoted to the Igokea first team. On 30 October 2016 he made his ABA League debut in a game against Cedevita. In March 2019, was loaned out to Mega Bemax for the rest of the 2018–19 Serbian League season.

Following the 2020–21 season Ilić declared himself for the 2021 NBA draft. On July 19, 2021, he withdrawn his name from consideration for the 2021 NBA draft.

On 14 July 2022, Ilić signed a four-year contract with Serbian club Crvena zvezda of the EuroLeague.

== National team career ==
Ilić was a member of the Serbian U16 team at the 2016 FIBA Europe Under-16 Championship. Over seven tournament games, he averaged 7.0 points, 5.6 rebounds and 2.6 assists per game. He was a member and the team captain of the Serbian U18 team that won the gold medal at the 2018 FIBA Europe Under-18 Championship in Latvia. Over seven tournament games, he averaged 9.3 points, 6.0 rebounds and 2.9 assists per game.

Ilić was a member of the Serbian under-19 team that finished 7th at the 2019 FIBA Under-19 Basketball World Cup in Heraklion, Greece. Over seven tournament games, he averaged 10.9 points, 11.0 rebounds and 3.3 assists per game.

== Career statistics ==
Legend
GP	Games played	GS	Games started	MPG	Minutes per game
FG%	Field-goal percentage	3P%	3-point field-goal percentage	FT%	Free-throw percentage
RPG	Rebounds per game	APG	Assists per game	SPG	Steals per game
BPG	Blocks per game	PPG	Points per game	PIR	Performance index rating
**Bold**	Career high

=== EuroLeague ===
Year	Team	GP	GS	MPG	FG%	3P%	FT%	RPG	APG	SPG	BPG	PPG	PIR
2022–23	Crvena zvezda	7	0	**9.6**	**.636**	.000	**.750**	**2.3**	.1	**.4**	—	**3.3**	**5.1**
2023–24	Crvena zvezda	**15**	**4**	8.8	.591	**.429**	.250	1.7	**.4**	.2	**.1**	2.0	2.5
Career		22	4	9.1	.606	.375	.625	1.9	.3	.3	.0	2.4	3.4

=== Basketball Champions League ===
Year	Team	GP	GS	MPG	FG%	3P%	FT%	RPG	APG	SPG	BPG	PPG
2020–21	Igokea	**10**	**10**	23.1	.535	.125	**.650**	5.4	.8	**.5**	.4	6.0
2021–22	Igokea	8	8	**27.1**	**.571**	**.200**	.577	**7.4**	**1.4**	**.5**	**.5**	**8.0**
Career		18	18	24.8	.553	.154	.609	6.3	1.1	.5	.4	6.9

=== Domestic leagues ===
Year	Team	League	GP	MPG	FG%	3P%	FT%	RPG	APG	SPG	BPG	PPG
2016–17	(Bosnia and Herzegovina) Igokea	ABA	2	2.0	.000	.000	—	—	—	—	—	0.0
2017–18	(Bosnia and Herzegovina) Igokea	Liga BiH	15	16.3	.500	.143	.625	4.7	.9	.3	.1	6.9
2018–19	(Bosnia and Herzegovina) Igokea	ABA	21	14.7	.565	.450	.813	4.1	.8	.3	.2	4.4
2018–19	(Serbia) Mega	KLS	12	23.5	.528	.286	.739	5.7	1.9	1.2	.6	10.1
2019–20	(Bosnia and Herzegovina) Igokea	Liga BiH	15	25.7	.598	.185	.657	9.1	2.1	.9	.7	11.2
2019–20	(Bosnia and Herzegovina) Igokea	ABA	20	23.3	.512	.216	.667	5.8	1.0	.8	.3	8.3
2020–21	(Bosnia and Herzegovina) Igokea	Liga BiH	10	24.9	.729	.500	.613	8.1	1.8	.6	.6	13.0
2020–21	(Bosnia and Herzegovina) Igokea	ABA	23	20.6	.479	.167	.645	4.4	1.0	.5	.3	7.0
2021–22	(Bosnia and Herzegovina) Igokea	Liga BiH	8	21.5	.526	.308	.692	5.6	.9	.4	.2	7.7
2021–22	(Bosnia and Herzegovina) Igokea	ABA	24	26.1	.575	.339	.713	7.7	1.2	.7	.4	12.7
2022–23	(Serbia) Crvena zvezda	KLS	2	13.1	.286	—	.636	3.0	1.5	—	—	5.5
2022–23	(Serbia) Crvena zvezda	ABA	19	14.6	.667	.375	.524	3.4	.8	.7	.2	5.1
2023–24	(Serbia) Crvena zvezda	KLS	3	17.7	.750	.333	.500	4.3	.3	.3	.3	5.0
2023–24	(Serbia) Crvena zvezda	ABA	22	11.0	.490	.278	.690	2.9	.4	.3	.1	3.4
