= Marko Ramljak =

Croatian basketball player

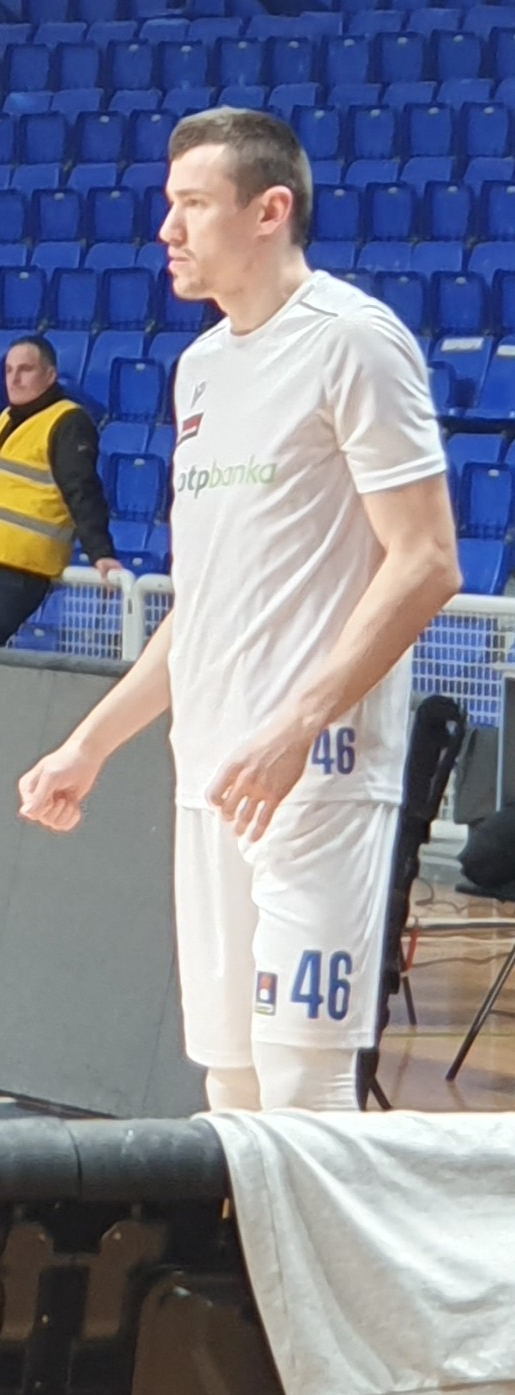
- Ramljak in 2023

No. 46 – Zadar
- Position: Shooting guard / small forward
- League: ABA League; Premijer liga

Personal information
- Born: March 14, 1993 (age 33) Posušje, Bosnia and Herzegovina
- Listed height: 2.00 m (6 ft 7 in)

Career information
- NBA draft: 2015: undrafted
- Playing career: 2010–present

Career history
- 2010–2016: Zadar
- 2016–2017: Cedevita
- 2017–2019: Zrinjski Mostar
- 2019–2020: Cibona
- 2020–2021: Balkan Botevgrad
- 2021: Twarde Pierniki Toruń
- 2021–2022: Posušje
- 2022: Spars Sarajevo
- 2022–present: Zadar

Career highlights
- 3× Croatian League champion (2017, 2023, 2024); Bosnian League champion (2018); 2× Croatian Cup winner (2017, 2024)
Medals
Men's Basketball 3x3
Representing Croatia
Youth Olympic Games
Silver medal – second place	2010 Singapore	Team

Marko Ramljak (born March 14, 1993) is a Croatian professional basketball player for Zadar of the Premijer liga and the ABA League. Standing at 2 m (6' 7"), he can play as a shooting guard and as a small forward.

== Early life ==
Ramljak grew up in Posušje where he drew attention to himself with his plays for the Croatian national basketball youth teams. He also participated at the 2010 Summer Youth Olympics were his team won the silver medal.

== Professional career ==
Ramljak signed his first professional contract with Zadar in September 2010. Ramljak constantly improved his performances and during the 2012–13 season, his second season in Zadar, he had become one of the club's key players.

On August 27, 2016, Ramljak parted ways with Zadar to join Cedevita for the 2016–17 season, where he helped the team to win the Croatian Cup and the Croatian League titles.

On September 6, 2017, Ramljak signed with Bosnian team Zrinjski Mostar. In 36 games played during the 2017–18 season, he averaged 11.4 points, 5.4 rebounds and 2.5 assists per game. Ramljak helped Zrinjski to win the Bosnian League title in 2018.

On April 22, 2019, Ramljak signed with the Israeli team Hapoel Be'er Sheva, but eventually the deal fell through and he returned to play for Zrinjski for the rest of the season. He joined Cibona in 2019 and averaged 8.2 points and 3.4 points per game. Ramljak was released by the team on July 15, 2020.

In August 2020, Ramljak signed with Balkan Botevgrad of the Bulgarian League.

On January 17, 2021, he signed with Twarde Pierniki Toruń of the Polish Basketball League (PLK).

In September, 2021, he joined his home town club Posušje of the Bosnian League. Ramljak averaged 17.2 points and 8.0 rebounds per game. On January 3, 2022, he signed with Spars Sarajevo.

== Personal life ==
His brothers, Tomislav (born 1985) and Ivan (born 1990) are also basketball players and have all played in the Croatia national basketball team youth selections.
