= 2019–20 Basketball Championship of Bosnia and Herzegovina =

Prvenstvo BiH
- Season: 2019–20
- Duration: October 2019 – May 2020
- Teams: 12

Regular season
- Season MVP: (United States) Keenan Evans

Finals
- Champions: Igokea

The 2019–20 Basketball Championship of Bosnia and Herzegovina was the 19th season of this championship, with 12 teams from Bosnia and Herzegovina participating in it. HKK Široki were the defending champion. On 13 March 2020, season was ended prematurely because of the coronavirus pandemic, naming Igokea as new champion.

== Competition format ==
Twelve teams would join the regular season, played with as double round-robin tournament. Igokea joined the competition, although they declined to participate previous season.

== Teams and locations ==
Locations of the 2019–20 Basketball Championship of Bosnia and Herzegovina teams

Čapljina Lasta, Leotar, and Promo DV were promoted from the previous season.

Team	City	Venue
Bratunac	Bratunac	SD Bratunac
Čapljina Lasta	Čapljina	Športska dvorana Čapljina
Igokea	Laktaši	Laktaši Sports Hall
Kakanj	Kakanj	JU KSC Kakanj
Leotar	Trebinje	SD Miloš Mrdić
Mladost	Mrkonjić Grad	Arena Komercijalne Banke
Promo DV	Donji Vakuf	
Spars Realway	Sarajevo	SD Novo Sarajevo
Sloboda	Tuzla	SKPC Mejdan
Široki	Široki Brijeg	GSD Pecara
Vogošća	Vogošća	SD Amel Bečković
Zrinjski	Mostar	SD Bijeli Brijeg

Teams that play in the 2019–20 Adriatic League First Division
Teams that play in the 2019–20 Adriatic League Second Division

== Regular season ==
=== Standings ===
Pos	Team	Pld	W	L	GF	GA	GD	Pts	Relegation
1	Igokea	20	18	2	1718	1372	+346	38	Qualification for Champions League qualifying round
2	Široki	20	16	4	1716	1466	+250	36	Qualification for ABA League Second Division
3	Spars Realway	20	14	6	1585	1475	+110	34	Qualification for ABA League Second Division
4	Sloboda	20	11	9	1609	1494	+115	31	Qualification for ABA League Second Division
5	Bratunac	20	10	10	1616	1595	+21	30	
6	Leotar	20	10	10	1594	1684	−90	30	
7	Zrinjski	20	9	11	1706	1692	+14	29	
8	Čapljina Lasta	20	9	11	1565	1580	−15	29	
9	Promo DV	20	8	12	1551	1610	−59	28	
10	Mladost	20	8	12	1653	1651	+2	28	
11	Kakanj	20	7	13	1568	1651	−83	27	
12	Vogošća	20	0	20	1495	2100	−605	20	Relegated

Source: Basketball Federation of BiH

=== Results ===
Home \ Away	BRA	CLA	IGO	KAK	LEO	MLA	PRO	SLO	SPA	SIR	VOG	ZRI
Bratunac	—		84–71		71–64	90–82	97–89	84–74	65–79	69–75	92–89	99–77
Čapljina Lasta	68–78	—	80–85	73–70	87–79	78–59	65–62		68–78		92–79	99–102
Igokea	69–67	73–59	—	103–73	86–67		80–52	78–49	98–76	86–70	141–77	83–61
Kakanj	86–83	82–75		—	72–74	83–79	77–79		70–94	81–79	69–65	93–79
Leotar	88–81	84–78	75–111	88–81	—		116–111	92–86	74–65	65–85		73–79
Mladost		95–71	69–85	76–67	102–85	—	79–75	98–90		55–73	138–67	91–82
Promo DV	74–85	78–63		79–75		86–80	—	75–78	54–66	58–80	73–48	75–100
Sloboda	88–73	81–68	65–71	74–63	78–65	98–66	87–64	—	87–75		143–74	
Spars Realway	84–78	81–84	68–73		84–65	90–73		78–70	—	64–77	108–66	84–82
Široki	88–64	89–81	76–63	99–87		99–81	94–83	82–60	70–71	—		90–76
Vogošća	75–105	84–121	66–73	84–105	84–93	80–99		72–78		86–94	—	69–89
Zrinjski			72–89	87–86	79–88	82–73	89–91	80–74	74–81	83–98	139–74	—

Source: Basketball Federation of BiH
Legend: Blue = home team win; Red = away team win.
