= 2017–18 Basketball Championship of Bosnia and Herzegovina =

Prvenstva BiH
- Duration: 14 October 2017 – 23 May 2018
- Teams: 12

Regular season
- Top seed: Zrinjski

Finals
- Champions: Zrinjski (1st title)
- Runners-up: Igokea
- Third place: Bosna Royal
- Fourth place: Spars Ziraat Bank

The 2017–18 Basketball Championship of Bosnia and Herzegovina was the 17th season of this championship, with twelve teams participating in it. Igokea, the defending champion, did not join the tournament until the second stage.

The competition started on 14 October 2017 and ended in the middle of May 2018.

== Competition format ==
Twelve teams would join the regular season, where the first five teams qualified for the Liga 6 with Igokea, that plays the season's ABA League First Division.

On 18 September 2017, the Basketball Federation of Bosnia and Herzegovina released the calendar of the regular season.

== Teams and locations ==
Locations of the 2017–18 Basketball Championship of Bosnia and Herzegovina teams

Team	City	Venue
Bosna Royal	Sarajevo	Mirza Delibašić Hall
Bošnjak	Hadžići	
Igokea	Laktaši	Laktaši Sports Hall
Kakanj	Kakanj	
Mladost Mrkonjić Grad	Mrkonjić Grad	Arena Komercijalne Banke Mrkonjić Grad
Radnik	Bijeljina	
Spars Ziraat Bank	Sarajevo	Mirza Delibašić Hall
Sloboda	Tuzla	SKPC Mejdan
Student Mostar	Mostar	
Široki	Široki Brijeg	Pecara
Vogošća	Vogošća	Sportska Dvorana Amel Bečković
Zrinjski	Mostar	Bijeli Brijeg Hall

Teams that play in the 2017–18 Adriatic League First Division
Teams that play in the 2017–18 Adriatic League Second Division

== Regular season ==
Pos	Team	Pld	W	L	GF	GA	GD	Pts	Qualification
1	Zrinjski	20	17	3	1675	1430	+245	37	Advance to Liga 6
2	Spars Ziraat Bank	20	16	4	1660	1491	+169	36	Advance to Liga 6
3	Bosna Royal	20	14	6	1560	1445	+115	34	Advance to Liga 6
4	Kakanj	20	13	7	1644	1486	+158	33	Advance to Liga 6
5	Široki	20	13	7	1540	1446	+94	33	Advance to Liga 6
6	Sloboda	20	9	11	1590	1593	−3	29	Advance to relegation stage
7	Mladost Mrkonjić Grad	20	9	11	1548	1581	−33	29	Advance to relegation stage
8	Student Mostar	20	7	13	1417	1577	−160	27	Advance to relegation stage
9	Vogošća	20	5	15	1536	1678	−142	25	Advance to relegation stage
10	Radnik	20	5	15	1430	1624	−194	25	Advance to relegation stage
11	Bošnjak	20	2	18	1427	1676	−249	22	Advance to relegation stage

Source: Basketball Federation of BiH

== Second stage ==
=== Group 1–6 ===
Pos	Team	Pld	W	L	PF	PA	PD	Pts	Qualification
1	Zrinjski	10	7	3	848	776	+72	17	Qualification to playoffs
2	Igokea	10	7	3	814	722	+92	17	Qualification to playoffs
3	Bosna Royal	10	5	5	772	757	+15	15	Qualification to playoffs
4	Spars Ziraat Bank	10	4	6	723	764	−41	14	Qualification to playoffs
5	Kakanj	10	4	6	747	835	−88	14	
6	Široki	10	3	7	778	828	−50	13	

Source: Basketball Federation of BiH

=== Group 7–12 ===
Pos	Team	Pld	W	L	PF	PA	PD	Pts	Relegation
1	Vogošća	10	8	2	873	744	+129	18	
2	Sloboda	10	7	3	886	807	+79	17	
3	Mladost Mrkonjić Grad	10	7	3	837	815	+22	17	
4	Student Mostar	10	4	6	800	823	−23	14	
5	Radnik (R)	10	3	7	712	813	−101	13	Relegation
6	Bošnjak (R)	10	1	9	784	890	−106	11	Relegation

Source: Basketball Federation of BiH
(R) Relegated

== Playoffs ==
Seeded teams played games 1, 3 and 5 at home.

Semi-finals
Zrinjski	70	64	88
Spars Ziraat Bank	90	56	72
Igokea	76	107
Bosna Royal	51	83

Final
Zrinjski	73	59	71	77
Igokea	67	80	65	73

Third place
Bosna Royal	82	55	71
Spars Ziraat Bank	74	69	67
