= Mujo Tuljković =

Bosna
- Position: Forward

Personal information
- Born: June 17, 1979 (age 47) Ljubovija, SR Serbia, SFR Yugoslavia
- Listed height: 2.03 m (6 ft 8 in)

Career information
- Playing career: 1997–2021

Career history

Playing
- 1997–2002: Cenex Sarajevo
- 2002–2003: Sloboda Dita
- 2002–2003: Istra Pula
- 2003–2004: Anwil Włocławek
- 2003–2005: Wisła Kraków
- 2005–2006: Helios Suns
- 2006–2007: Bosna
- 2007–2008: Świecie
- 2007–2008: Basket Kwidzyn
- 2008–2009: Starogard Gdański
- 2009–2010: Anwil Włocławek
- 2010–2011: Basket Poznań
- 2011–2012: Szolnoki Olajbányász
- 2012–2013: Vogošća
- 2012–2013: Timișoara
- 2013–2014: Kakanj
- 2013–2014: Starogard Gdański
- 2013–2014: Građanski Bijeljina
- 2014–2015: Bosna
- 2014–2015: OKK Sloboda Tuzla
- 2014–2015: Bashkimi Prizren
- 2015–2016: Zrinjski
- 2015–2016: Radnik Bijeljina
- 2016–2017: Bošnjak Hadžići
- 2017–2018: Vogošća
- 2017–2018: Bosna
- 2018–2019: Gradina Srebrenik
- 2019–2020: Vogošća
- 2020–2021: Spars Realway

Coaching
- 2026-: KK Bosna BH Telecom (team manager)

Mujo Tuljković (born 17 June 1979) is a retired Bosnian professional basketball player and former member of the Bosnia and Herzegovina national basketball team. Over a career spanning more than two decades, Tuljković played for numerous clubs in Bosnia and Herzegovina and abroad, and represented his country at international competitions.

== Early life and career ==
Tuljković was born on 17 June 1979 in Ljubovija. He began his professional basketball career in 1997 with Cenex Sarajevo, beginning what would become a long and varied club career spanning multiple countries.

== Club career ==
During his lengthy professional career during which he was known as a journeyman, Tuljković played for many teams in Bosnia and Herzegovina and internationally, including Sloboda Dita, Bosna, OKK Spars Realway, and clubs in Poland, Romania, Hungary, Turkey, Croatia, Slovenia, and Kosovo. He was known for his scoring ability, leadership, and longevity in the sport.

In the 2012–13 Basketball Championship of Bosnia and Herzegovina, while playing for Vogošća, Tuljković was the leading scorer and rebounder in the league, averaging 23.8 points and 9.4 rebounds per game.

== International career ==
Tuljković represented Bosnia and Herzegovina at the senior international level. He competed at EuroBasket 2005 and also appeared for the national team in other FIBA Europe qualifiers.

== Later career and retirement ==
After continuing to play into his early 40s, Tuljković announced his retirement from professional basketball at age 42. Following his playing career, he accepted a position as team manager at OKK Spars Realway, remaining involved in Bosnian basketball.
