= Nemanja Kovačević =

Serbian basketball player

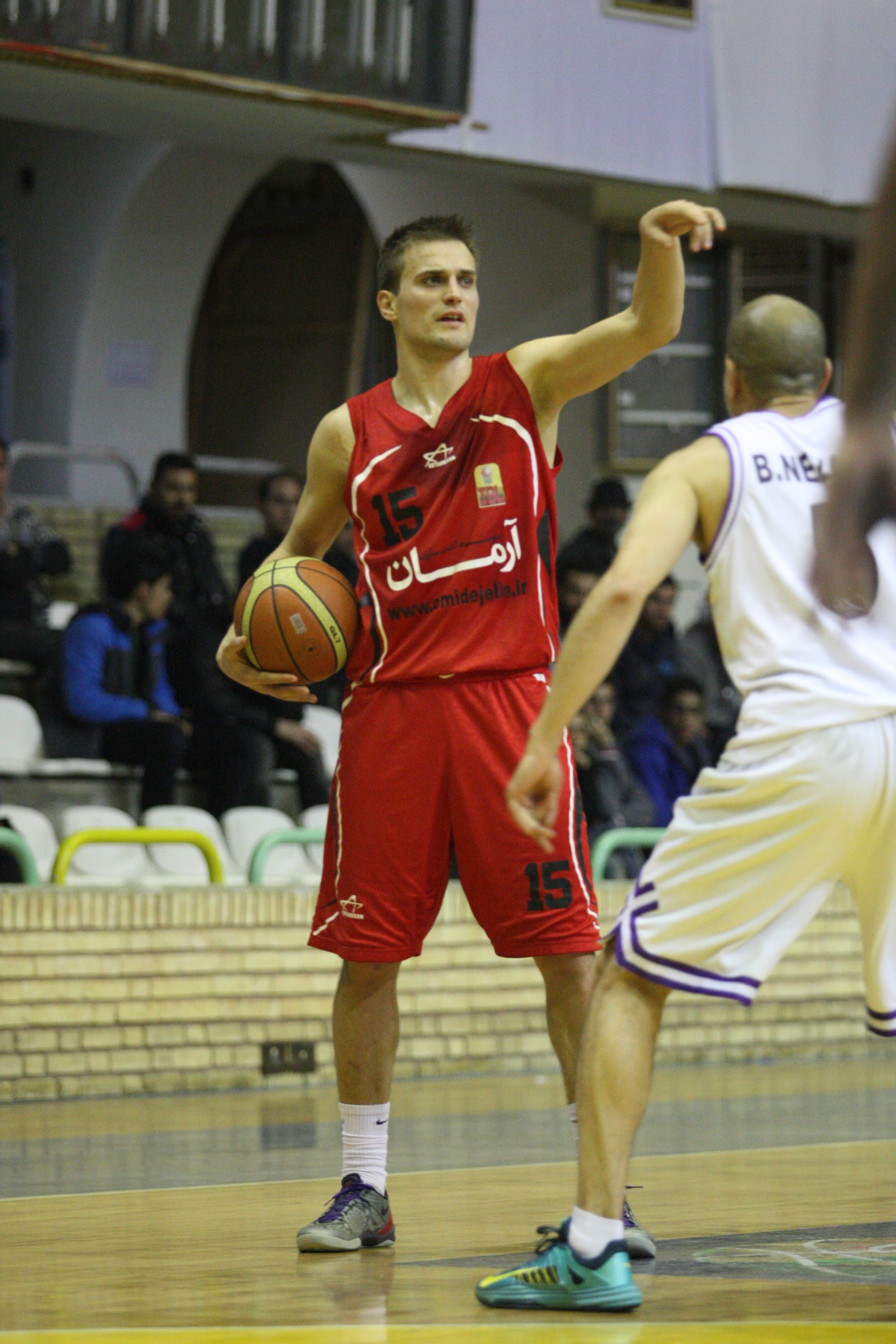
- Nemanja Kovačević - Shahrdari Gorgan BC in 2014

Grasshopper Zürich
- Position: Point guard
- League: Championnat LNB

Personal information
- Born: March 19, 1985 (age 41) Pančevo, SR Serbia, SFR Yugoslavia
- Listed height: 1.94 m (6 ft 4 in)
- Listed weight: 90 kg (198 lb)

Career information
- NBA draft: 2007: undrafted
- Playing career: 2003–present

Career history
- 2003–2004: Atlas
- 2004–2005: Jagodina
- 2005–2006: Ulcinj
- 2006–2007: Hercegovac Bileća
- 2007–2008: Leotar Trebinje
- 2008–2009: Swisslion Vršac
- 2009–2010: Radnicki Kragujevac
- 2010: Tamis
- 2010–2011: Vojvodina
- 2011–2013: Čapljina Lasta
- 2013–2014: PVSK Panthers
- 2014: Shahrdari Gorgan
- 2014–2015: Pitesti
- 2015–2016: Levicki Patrioti
- 2016: Gradjanski
- 2016–2017: Swiss Central
- 2018–present: Grasshopper Zürich

Nemanja Kovačević (Serbian Cyrillic: Немања Ковачевић; born March 19, 1985) is a Serbian professional basketball player for Grasshopper Zürich of the Championnat LNB.

== Early career ==
As a pioneer and cadet (1998–2003), he took the team of Beopetrol. With Beopetrol becomes champion of the Cadet Championship of Serbia and Champion of the Cadet Championship FR Yugoslavia, since 2003 he goes to Atlas, conquers the junu Serbia and 3rd place for juniors of Serbia and Montenegro. Here he starts his professional career.

== Professional career ==
Kovačević played for Atlas/Beopetrol, Jagodina, Ulcinj, Hercegovac Bileća, Leotar from Trebinje, Svislajon Takovo from Vršac, Radnički Kragujevac, Tamiš from Pančevo, Vojvodina Srbijagas from Novi Sad, Čapljina Lasta, PVSK Panthers from Pécs, Hungary, Shahrdari Gorgan BC from Iran, Pitesti from Romania, Levicki Patrioti from Slovakia, Građanski from Bijeljina, Swiss Central from Switzerland. In the 2008–09 season, he played for Swisslion Vršac with which he managed to choose to participate in the ABA League.

== Career highlights and awards ==
- Defensive Player of the year in Bosnia and Herzegovina in the season 2011/12.
- 1st place in the Super League with 5.2 assists per game.
- 1st place in the Super League with 2.2 goals per game.
- 2. MVP of the Bosnian Super League (League 6) 2012/13.
- 2nd best five in the Iranian Superliga in the season 2013/14.
- 2nd place in the Super League with 4.17 assists per game.
- In the best team of Iranian Superliga 2013/14.
- The top five at All-Star Games SBL League 2015/16, Slovakia.
- 2nd best league assistant 2016/17, Switzerland.
