= Mokro =

Mokro (Serbo-Croatian for "wet") may refer to:

- Mokro, Pale, Bosnia and Herzegovina
- Mokro, Konjic, Bosnia and Herzegovina
- Mokro, Šavnik, Montenegro
- Mokro Polje, Croatia
- Duboko Mokro, Bosnia and Herzegovina

== See also ==
- Mokronoge (disambiguation), toponym in Bosnia and Herzegovina
- Mokronozi, Rudo, Bosnia and Herzegovina
- Mokroluški potok, Serbia
