= Ivan Ramljak =

Croatian basketball player (born 1990)

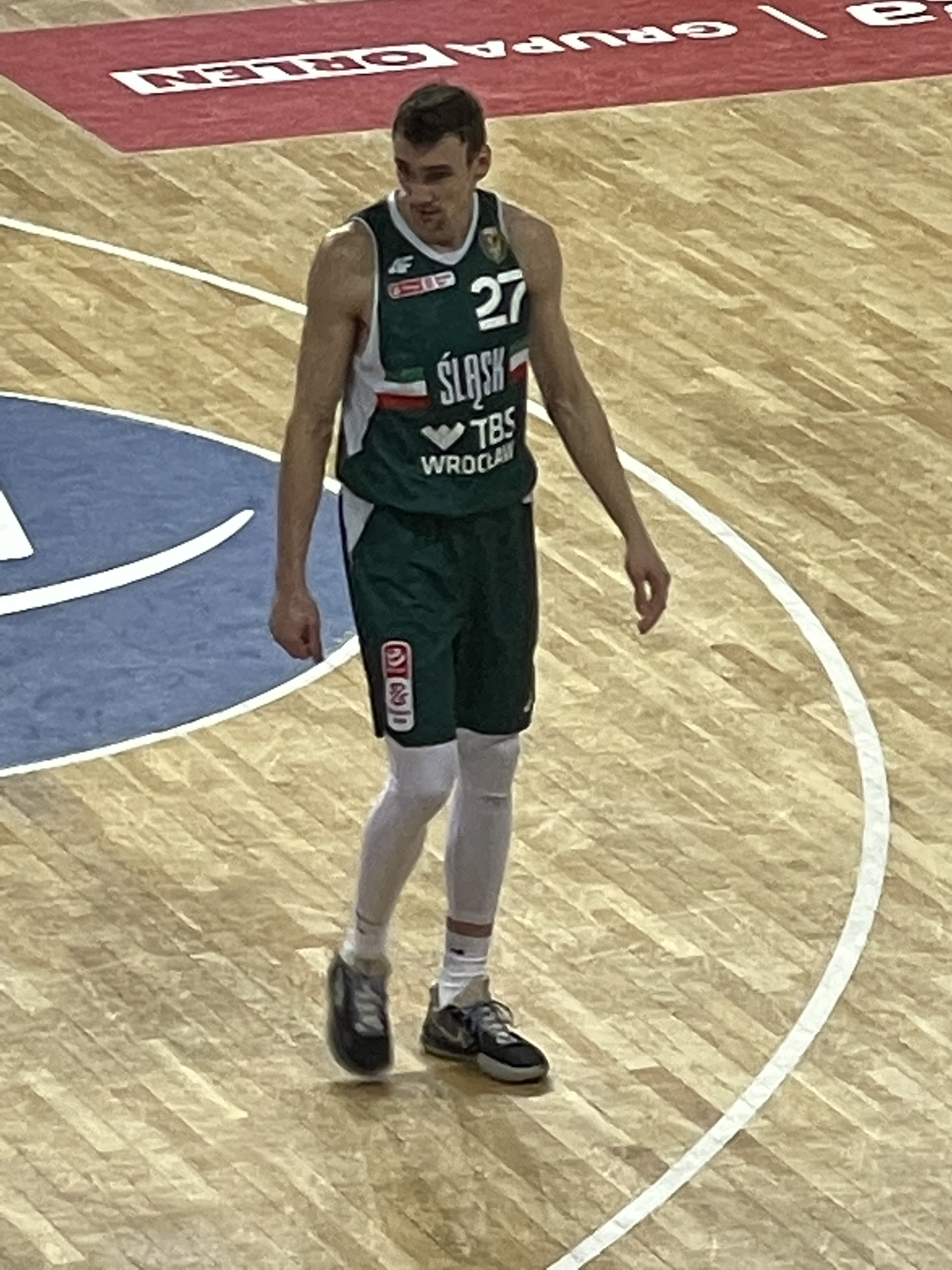

No. 27 – Poitiers Basket 86
- Position: Small forward / power forward
- League: LNB Pro B

Personal information
- Born: August 9, 1990 (age 36) Mostar, SR Bosnia and Herzegovina, SFR Yugoslavia
- Listed height: 6 ft 8 in (2.03 m)

Career information
- NBA draft: 2012: undrafted
- Playing career: 2007–present

Career history
- 2007–2009: Posušje
- 2009–2013: Široki
- 2013–2015: Cedevita Zagreb
- 2015–2016: Zadar
- 2016: Zagreb
- 2016–2017: Zadar
- 2017–2019: Cedevita Zagreb
- 2019–2020: Krka
- 2020–2021: Śląsk Wrocław
- 2021: Poitiers Basket 86
- 2021–2023: Śląsk Wrocław
- 2023–present: Poitiers Basket 86

Career highlights
- 3× Bosnian League champion (2010–2012); 3× Croatian League champion (2014, 2015, 2018); Polish League champion (2022); 2× Bosnian Cup winner (2011, 2012); 4× Croatian Cup winner (2014, 2015, 2018, 2019); 2× PLK Best Defender (2021, 2022)
Medals
Men's basketball
Representing Croatia
European U-18 Championship
Bronze medal – third place	2008 Greece	U-18 Team

Ivan Ramljak (born August 9, 1990) is a Croatian professional basketball player currently playing for Poitiers Basket 86 in the French second-tier LNB Pro B. Standing at 2.03 m, he can play both forward positions.

== Professional career ==
Ramljak, a native of Posušje, grew up in HKK Posušje where he played as a professional until 2009. He began his career in 2007, and made his ABA league debut in the 2009–10 season, when as a 19-year-old he played 10 games for Široki. In the 2012–13 season Ramljak averaged 7.6 pts, 3.9 reb and 1.1 ass in 24.1 min in the ABA League, while in the Bosnian League he averaged 7.7 pts, 14.5 reb, 1.4 assists in 22 minutes. In June 2013 he signed with the Croatian side Cedevita Zagreb. On 26 June 2015, he left Cedevita. On the beginning of the 2015–16 season he signed with Zadar joining his brother Marko in the same team. After spending the season in Zadar, he had a short spell in Zagreb, but then returned to Zadar in October 2016 signing a contract lasting until the end of the 2016–17 season.

On June 27, 2019, he signed with Krka of the Slovenian League.

On September 1, 2020, he has signed with Śląsk Wrocław of the PLK.

== International career ==
Ramljak was part of the Croatian national team youth selections. He took part in the 2008 European U-18 Championship where he won bronze and the 2010 U-20 European Championship were Croatia came fourth.

He was part of the senior Croatian national team at the 2017 FIBA EuroBasket and the 2019 FIBA Basketball World Cup qualifications.

== Personal life ==
His older brother Tomislav (born 1985) and younger brother Marko (born 1993) are also basketball players and have all played in the Croatia national basketball team youth selections.
