= KK Budućnost (disambiguation) =

KK Budućnost may refer to:

- KK Budućnost Bijeljina, basketball team based in Bijeljina, Bosnia and Herzegovina
- KK Budućnost Novi Sad, basketball team based in Novi Sad, Serbia
- KK Budućnost Podgorica, basketball team based in Podgorica, Montenegro
- KK Budućnost Valjevo, based in Valjevo, Serbia (1948–1954); former name of Metalac
