= Srpska Liga =

Srpska Liga may refer to:

- Serbian League, a third-division Serbian football league
- Srpska Liga, a second-division basketball league in the Republika Srpska, Bosnia and Herzegovina
