= 2020–21 ABA League Second Division =

ABA League Second Division
- Season: 2020–21
- Duration: 9 November 2020 – 6 May 2021
- Teams: 14
- TV partner(s): Arena Sport

Regular season
- Top seed: (Montenegro) Studentski centar

Finals
- Champions: (Montenegro) Studentski centar (1st title)
- Runners-up: (Bosnia and Herzegovina) Spars
- Semifinalists: (Serbia) Mladost (Montenegro) Podgorica
- Finals MVP: (Serbia) Marko Tejić

Statistical leaders
Points	(Slovenia) Blaž Mahkovic	21.2
Rebounds	(Bosnia and Herzegovina) Kenan Kamenjaš	10.4
Assists	(Slovenia) Daniel Vujasinović	7.1
Index Rating	(Bosnia and Herzegovina) Kenan Kamenjaš	26.2

Records
- Highest scoring: Mladost 101–107 Zlatibor (4 March 2021)
- Winning streak: 9 games Studentski centar
- Losing streak: 10 games Helios Suns
- All statistics correct as of March 28, 2020.

The 2020–21 ABA League Second Division was the 4th season of the ABA Second Division with 14 teams from Bosnia and Herzegovina, Croatia, Montenegro, North Macedonia, Serbia, and Slovenia participating in it. The season has started on 9 November 2020.

The season was the first to be played after the previous season was abandoned due to the COVID-19 pandemic. In accordance with the COVID-19 situation, it has been determined that the season will be played in new competition format and new calendar.

== Teams ==
A total of 14 teams contested the league, including two representatives from all six ABA League countries. In cases where a club from an individual country does not apply for the 2020–21 season, the empty spot will be filled by awarding wild cards. The first two teams from the previous season, Borac Čačak and Split, were awarded wild cards to compete in the 2020–21 ABA League First Division. On 29 June 2020, the ABA League Assembly confirmed the final list of the 2020–21 season participants.

=== Team allocation ===
Location of teams in the 2020–21 ABA League Second Division

The labels in the parentheses show how each team qualified for the place of its starting round:

- 1st, 2nd, 3rd, 4th, etc.: National League position
- WC: Wild card
- Abd-: League positions of abandoned season due to the COVID-19 pandemic as determined by the leagues

Regular season
(Montenegro) Sutjeska (Abd-1st)	(Bosnia and Herzegovina) Široki (Abd-2nd)	(Serbia) Sloboda Užice (2nd)	(North Macedonia) MZT Skopje (Abd-1st)
(Montenegro) Lovćen 1947 (Abd-2nd)	(Bosnia and Herzegovina) Spars (Abd-3rd)	(Serbia) Zlatibor (3rd)	(North Macedonia) Rabotnički (Abd-2nd)
(Montenegro) Studentski centar (WC)	(Bosnia and Herzegovina) Borac Banja Luka (WC)	(Serbia) Mladost Zemun (WC)	
(Montenegro) Podgorica (WC)	(Croatia) Gorica (Abd-4th)	(Slovenia) Helios Suns (Abd-4th)	

In early June 2020, seven clubs contested for four wild cards. Later that month, Serbian club Novi Pazar withdrew its bid following failure to meet financial requirements. On 29 June, the ABA League Assembly announced four wild cards recipients, including Sloboda Tuzla (Bosnia and Herzegovina), Studentski centar (Montenegro), Podgorica Bemax (Montenegro) and Mladost Zemun (Serbia). Teams Borac Banja Luka (Bosnia and Herzegovina) and Gostivar (North Macedonia) did not receive the wild card.

Reportedly, Borac Banja Luka received an invitation on 6 October 2020, after Sloboda Tuzla withdrawal. On 13 October, the League officially confirmed Borac Banja Luka as the final participant in the 2020–21 season.

=== Personnel and sponsorship ===
Team	Home city	Head coach	Captain	Kit manufacturer	Shirt sponsor
Borac	Banja Luka	(Serbia) Dragan Nikolić		Kelme	MMS Code
Gorica	Velika Gorica	(Croatia) Josip Sesar	(Croatia) Ivan Majcunić		—
Helios Suns	Domžale	(Slovenia) Dejan Jakara	(Slovenia) Aljaž Bratec	Spalding	Helios, Triglav
Lovćen 1947	Cetinje	(Montenegro) Petar Jovanović	(Montenegro) Nikola Borilović	Macron	—
Mladost MaxBet	Belgrade	(Serbia) Dragan Jakovljević	(Serbia) Marko Milenković	Champion	MaxBet
MZT Skopje Aerodrom	Skopje	(North Macedonia) Darko Radulović	(North Macedonia) Damjan Stojanovski	Givova	UNIBanka
Podgorica	Podgorica	(Montenegro) Zoran Kašćelan		—	Master, Bemax
Rabotnički	Skopje	(North Macedonia) Dimitar Mirakovski	(North Macedonia) Kiril Nikolovski		—
Sloboda	Užice	(Serbia) Oliver Popović	(Serbia) Stefan Simić	Ardu Sport	mts
Spars	Sarajevo	(Montenegro) Miodrag Kadija		No1	Number 1
Studentski centar	Podgorica	(Serbia) Nenad Trajković		Spalding	VOLI, Moj Lab
Sutjeska	Nikšić	(Serbia) Velimir Gašić	(Montenegro) Boris Lalović	Spalding	EP CG
Široki	Široki Brijeg	(Croatia) Damir Vujanović	(Bosnia and Herzegovina) Jure Zubac	Ardu Sport	Kandit
Zlatibor	Čajetina	(Serbia) Strajin Nedović	(Serbia) Bogdan Riznić	Ardu Sport	Boje i fasade Maxima

=== Coaching changes ===
Team	Outgoing manager	Date of vacancy	Position in table	Replaced with	Date of appointment	Ref.
Podgorica	(Montenegro) Vladan Radović	May 2020	Off-season	(Montenegro) Zoran Kašćelan	May 2020	
Sutjeska	(Montenegro) Zoran Glomazić	17 July 2020	Off-season	(Serbia) Velimir Gašić	17 July 2020	
Lovćen 1947	(Montenegro) Zoran Kašćelan	May 2020	Off-season	(Montenegro) Petar Jovanović	3 August 2020	
Široki	(Croatia) Hrvoje Vlašić	August 2020	Off-season	(Croatia) Damir Vujanović	6 August 2020	
Sloboda	(Serbia) Vladimir Lučić	1 November 2020	Off-season	(Serbia) Oliver Popović	1 November 2020	
Borac Banja Luka	(Bosnia and Herzegovina) Marko Šćekić	3 December 2020	6th (2–2)	(Serbia) Dragan Nikolić	3 December 2020	
Spars	(Bosnia and Herzegovina) Nedim Džemić	31 December 2020	7th (2–2)	(Montenegro) Miodrag Kadija	2 January 2021	
MZT Skopje Aerodrom	(North Macedonia) Gjorgji Kočov	14 March 2021	4th (6–4)	(North Macedonia) Darko Radulović (interim)	14 March 2021	

== Venues ==
The Regular season was divided in four tournaments. The first tournament was held in Čajetina, Serbia. The second tournament was held in Banja Luka, Bosnia and Herzegovina. The third tournament was held in Sarajevo, Bosnia and Herzegovina while the fourth was held in Čajetina. The playoffs will be held in Podgorica, Montenegro.

Zlatibor, Čajetina	2020–21 ABA League Second Division (Yugoslavia)	Sarajevo
STC Zlatibor – Wai Tai	2020–21 ABA League Second Division (Yugoslavia)	Arena Hills Sports Hall
Capacity: 2,500	2020–21 ABA League Second Division (Yugoslavia)	Capacity: N/A
Banja Luka	2020–21 ABA League Second Division (Yugoslavia)	Podgorica
Borik Sports Hall	2020–21 ABA League Second Division (Yugoslavia)	Morača Sports Center
Capacity: 3,060	2020–21 ABA League Second Division (Yugoslavia)	Capacity: 6,000

== Regular season ==
The Regular season was split in four tournaments with two tournaments featuring four rounds and the last one five rounds. It will be played in a round-robin system and after 13 rounds there will be Playoffs with eight teams and Play-out with four teams.

The first tournament of four rounds took place between 9 November and 18 November 2020 in Čajetina, Serbia. The Croatian club Gorica missed the first tournament due to records of several COVID-19 positive players within their team. The second tournament of three rounds took place between 18 January and 24 January 2021 in Banja Luka, Bosnia and Herzegovina. The Macedonian club Rabotnički missed the second tournament due to COVID-19 pandemic situation and the restrictions.

The third tournament of three rounds was held from 1–7 March 2021 in Sarajevo, Bosnia and Herzegovina.

=== League table ===
Pos	Team	Pld	W	L	PF	PA	PD	Pts	Qualification or relegation
1	(Montenegro) Studentski centar	13	12	1	1119	966	+153	25	Advance to the Playoffs
2	(Bosnia and Herzegovina) Spars	13	10	3	1013	934	+79	23	Advance to the Playoffs
3	(Bosnia and Herzegovina) Borac Banja Luka	13	9	4	1051	980	+71	22	Advance to the Playoffs
4	(Serbia) Mladost MaxBet	13	8	5	1077	1030	+47	21	Advance to the Playoffs
5	(North Macedonia) MZT Skopje Aerodrom	13	8	5	1048	986	+62	21	Advance to the Playoffs
6	(Montenegro) Podgorica	13	7	6	991	1023	−32	20	Advance to the Playoffs
7	(Serbia) Zlatibor	13	6	7	960	1002	−42	19	Advance to the Playoffs
8	(Serbia) Sloboda Užice	13	6	7	988	1002	−14	19	Advance to the Playoffs
9	(Bosnia and Herzegovina) Široki	13	5	8	959	986	−27	18	
10	(Croatia) Gorica	13	5	8	619	658	−39	18	
11	(North Macedonia) Rabotnički	13	5	8	774	871	−97	18	Advance to the Playout
12	(Montenegro) Lovćen 1947	13	5	8	990	1072	−82	18	Advance to the Playout
13	(Montenegro) Sutjeska	13	4	9	1037	1064	−27	17	Advance to the Playout
14	(Slovenia) Helios Suns	13	1	12	900	952	−52	14	Advance to the Playout

Source: ABA2

=== Positions by round ===
First place & advance to the playoffs
Advance to the playoffs
Advance to the playout

Team ╲ Round	1	2	3	4	5	6	7	8	9	10	11	12	13
(Montenegro) Studentski centar	1	1	1	1	1	1	1	1	1	1	1	1	1
(Bosnia and Herzegovina) Spars	7	2	3	7	5	2	6	4	4	3	3	3	2
(Bosnia and Herzegovina) Borac Banja Luka	8	4	2	6	6	8	4	2	3	2	2	2	3
(Serbia) Mladost Maxbet	5	7	11	8	8	7	5	3	6	5	5	5	4
(North Macedonia) MZT Skopje Aerodrom	9	6	4	2	2	3	7	5	2	4	4	4	5
(Montenegro) Podgorica	6	9	6	4	3	5	8	9	8	9	7	6	6
(Serbia) Zlatibor	3	3	7	5	4	6	3	7	5	7	8	8	7
(Serbia) Sloboda Užice	11	8	5	3	7	4	2	6	7	6	6	7	8
(Bosnia and Herzegovina) Široki	2	5	9	12	13	10	9	8	9	8	9	9	9
(Croatia) Gorica	13	14	14	14	14	14	12	12	13	11	11	11	10
(North Macedonia) Rabotnički	14	11	8	9	10	12	13	13	11	13	13	13	11
(Montenegro) Lovćen 1947	4	10	12	13	9	11	11	10	10	12	12	12	12
(Montenegro) Sutjeska	12	12	13	10	11	9	10	11	12	10	10	10	13
(Slovenia) Helios Suns	10	13	10	11	12	13	14	14	14	14	14	14	14

Source: ABA2

=== Results ===
Home \ Away	BOR	GOR	HEL	LOV	MLA	MZT	POD	RAB	SLO	SPA	STC	SUT	ŠIR	ZLA
Borac	—	—	79–74	90–71	—	—	98–78	—	—	88–90	87–79	100–93	—	93–70
Gorica	0–20	—	—	—	69–76	—	—	20–0	0–20	—	—	92–82	—	72–57
Helios Suns	—	20–0	—	—	77–80	69–70	85–87	66–67	75–84	—	—	—	72–77	—
Lovćen 1947 Bemax	—	78–80	78–71	—	80–78	55–96	—	—	—	—	64–83	—	75–66	—
Mladost Maxbet	91–83	—	—	—	—	—	—	89–73	87–89	92–77	—	80–90	—	101–107
MZT Skopje Aerodrom	99–75	77–73	—	—	75–82	—	72–74	84–82	70–81	—	—	92–73	—	—
Podgorica	—	65–72	—	83–76	71–79	—	—	70–76	—	75–80	—	—	—	79–76
Rabotnički	77–82	—	—	82–77	—	—	—	—	87–77	0–20	—	84–62	—	0–20
Sloboda	83–89	—	—	92–95	—	—	51–63	—	—	92–90	86–94	81–78	—	67–79
Spars	—	85–84	90–73	82–76	—	76–68	—	—	—	—	77–78	—	93–80	—
Studentski centar	—	61–59	83–78	—	65–59	92–75	100–82	98–69	—	—	—	—	98–62	—
Sutjeska	—	—	77–67	—	—	—	75–80	79–69	—	62–71	94–100	—	84–66	78–82
Široki	75–67	20–0	—	—	76–83	73–80	83–84	75–82	95–85	—	—	—	—	—
Zlatibor	—	—	80–73	90–99	—	71–90	—	—	—	66–82	74–88	—	88–80	—

Source: ABA2
Legend: Blue = home team win; Red = away team win.
Matches with lighter background shading were decided after overtime.

== Playoffs ==
Based on the results and position of the clubs in the standings after the regular season, Playoffs will take place with teams from 1st to 8th position. The Quarterfinals will be played in knockout pairs 1–8, 2–7, 3–6, 4–5. The winners of the Quarterfinals will qualify to the Semifinals and the winners of the Semifinals will play the Final.

The playoff tournament will be held in Podgorica, Montenegro between 19 April and 6 May 2021.

Quarterfinals
19–21 April
3 (Bosnia and Herzegovina) Borac Banja Luka	90	65	155
6 (Montenegro) Podgorica	86	77	163
19–21 April
2 (Bosnia and Herzegovina) Spars	79	82	161
7 (Serbia) Zlatibor	82	74	156
20–22 April
4 (Serbia) Mladost MaxBet	95	86	181
5 (North Macedonia) MZT Skopje Aerodrom	75	92	167
20–22 April
1 (Montenegro) Studentski centar	96	90	186
8 (Serbia) Sloboda Užice	92	80	172

Semifinals
23–25 April
6 (Montenegro) Podgorica	64	59	123
2 (Bosnia and Herzegovina) Spars	72	74	146
24–26 April
4 (Serbia) Mladost MaxBet	85	66	151
1 (Montenegro) Studentski centar	86	76	162

Finals
4–6 May
2 (Bosnia and Herzegovina) Spars	89	72	161
1 (Montenegro) Studentski centar	99	71	170

== Playout ==
Based on the results and position of the clubs in the standings after the regular season, Playout would take place with teams from 11th to 14th position. The Playout would be played in knockout pairs 11–14, 12–13. The defeated teams would play for the final 13th and 14th places in the standings. On 3 April 2021, the playout tournament was canceled due to the COVID-19 pandemic.

Four clubs, Lovćen 1947, Rabotnički, Sutjeska, and Helios Suns, were qualified for the tournament.

== Promotion playoffs ==
The 13th placed team of the First Division season and the runners-up of the Second Division season will play in the Qualifiers for a spot in the next First Division season.

Qualified clubs
Leagues	Clubs
First Division	(Croatia) Split
Second Division	(Bosnia and Herzegovina) Spars

=== Results ===
Team 1	Series	Team 2	Game 1	Game 2	Game 3
Split (Croatia)	2–1	(Bosnia and Herzegovina) Spars	70–76	84–64	90–60

== MVP List ==
=== MVP of the Round ===
Round	Player	Team	PIR
1	(Montenegro) Miloš Popović	(Montenegro) Lovćen 1947	33
2	(Bosnia and Herzegovina) Kenan Kamenjaš	(Bosnia and Herzegovina) Spars	33
3	(United States) Femi Olujobi	(North Macedonia) MZT Skopje Aerodrom	33
4	(United States) Trey Drechsel	(Serbia) Mladost Zemun	46
5	(Serbia) Nikola Tanasković	(Bosnia and Herzegovina) Borac Banja Luka	29
6	(Serbia) Đorđe Milošević	(Montenegro) Sutjeska	32
7	(United States) Trey Drechsel	(Serbia) Mladost Zemun	43
8	(Croatia) Dario Drežnjak	(Bosnia and Herzegovina) Široki	50
9	(Bosnia and Herzegovina) Amar Gegić	(Bosnia and Herzegovina) Spars	40
10	(United States) Aaron Thomas	(Bosnia and Herzegovina) Široki	27
11	(Montenegro) Miloš Popović	(Montenegro) Lovćen 1947	35
12	(Croatia) Filip Bundović	(North Macedonia) Rabotnički	37
13	(Bosnia and Herzegovina) Amar Gegić	(Bosnia and Herzegovina) Spars	30
QF1	(Serbia) Dušan Tanasković	(Serbia) Mladost Zemun	31
QF2	(Serbia) Novak Musić	(Montenegro) Podgorica	38
SF1	(Bosnia and Herzegovina) Kenan Kamenjaš	(Bosnia and Herzegovina) Spars	26
SF2	(Bosnia and Herzegovina) Kenan Kamenjaš	(Bosnia and Herzegovina) Spars	35
F1	(Serbia) Marko Tejić	(Montenegro) Studentski centar	27
F2	(Bosnia and Herzegovina) Kenan Kamenjaš	(Bosnia and Herzegovina) Spars	26

Source: ABA 2 League

== See also ==
- List of current ABA League Second Division team rosters
- 2020–21 ABA League First Division

2020–21 domestic competitions

- 2020–21 Basketball Championship of Bosnia and Herzegovina
- (Croatia) 2020–21 HT Premijer liga
- (Montenegro) 2020–21 Prva A liga
- (North Macedonia) 2020–21 Macedonian First League
- 2020–21 Basketball League of Serbia
- (Slovenia) 2020–21 Slovenian Basketball League
