= Mokronoge =

Mokronoge may refer to the following places in Bosnia and Herzegovina :

- Mokronoge, Tomislavgrad
- Mokronoge, Drvar

== See also ==
- Mokronoge massacre
- Mokronog
