= Željko Šakić =

Croatian basketball player

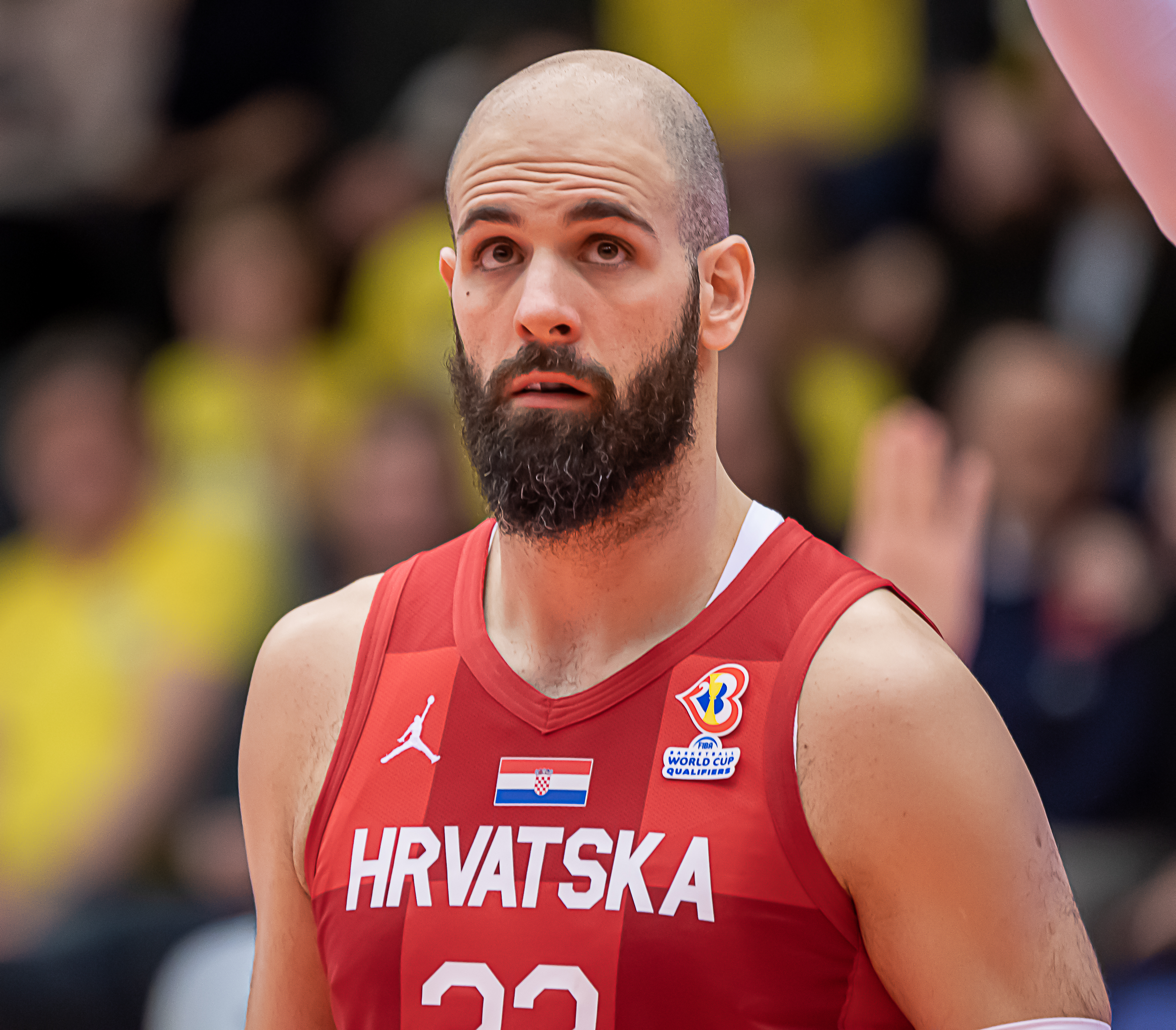
- Šakić with Croatia in 2022

Free Agent
- Position: Power forward

Personal information
- Born: April 14, 1988 (age 38) Zagreb, SR Croatia, SFR Yugoslavia
- Listed height: 6 ft 8 in (2.03 m)
- Listed weight: 234 lb (106 kg)

Career information
- NBA draft: 2010: undrafted
- Playing career: 2006–present

Career history
- 2006–2007: Kaptol
- 2007–2010: Dubrava
- 2010–2011: Zrinjski Mostar
- 2011–2013: Široki
- 2013–2014: Sutor Montegranaro
- 2014–2015: Manresa
- 2015–2016: Lukoil Academic
- 2016–2017: Cibona
- 2017–2018: U-BT Cluj-Napoca
- 2018–2019: Stelmet Zielona Góra
- 2019–2020: Lietkabelis Panevėžys
- 2020–2021: Avtodor
- 2021: Estudiantes
- 2021–2022: Avtodor
- 2022: UNICS
- 2022–2023: Lietkabelis Panevėžys
- 2023–2024: Tofaş
- 2024–2025: Élan Chalon
- 2025–2026: Gaziantep Basketbol

Career highlights
- 2× Bosnian League champion (2011, 2012); Bulgarian League champion (2016); Bosnian Cup winner (2012)

Željko Šakić (born April 14, 1988) is a Croatian professional basketball player who last played for Gaziantep Basketbol of the TBL. Standing at 6 ft 8 in (2.03 m), he plays the power forward position.

== Professional career ==
Šakić started playing basketball in the Cibona youth systems but never got an opportunity to play for the senior squad. After he almost quit basketball, in 2007 he got an offer from another club from Zagreb, Dubrava where he spent the next 3 seasons. After that he spent 3 seasons in the Bosnian League and then moved to Sutor Montegranaro of the Italian League. He spent the 2014–15 season in Manresa of the Spanish League earning the 4th week Player of the Week award.

In August 2015 he moved to the Bulgarian champion Lukoil Academic.

On June 29, 2016, Šakić signed with Cibona. After a season spent playing in the Romanian League for U-BT Cluj-Napoca, in September 2018 he moved to the Polish side Stelmet Zielona Góra.

On 10 July 2019, Šakić signed a one-year deal with Lietkabelis Panevėžys of the Lithuanian Basketball League (LKL).

On June 25, 2020, he has signed with Avtodor of the VTB United League.

In March, 2022, Šakić signed with UNICS for the rest of the season.

On 24 July 2022, Šakić returned to Lietkabelis Panevėžys for a second stint, signing a two-year (1+1) deal. On 1 July 2023, he parted ways with the club.

On July 11, 2023, he signed with Tofaş of Basketbol Süper Ligi (BSL).

In September 2024, Šakić signed with Élan Chalon of the French League.

== Croatian national team ==
Šakić was part of the Croatian national team youth selections. He was one of the leading Croatian players at the 2006 FIBA Europe Under-18 Championship and the 2008 FIBA Europe Under-20 Championship, but to play with the senior team he had to wait for the 2015 EuroBasket preparation games. At the age of 27, he was the oldest debutant in the history of the Croatian national basketball team.
