= Boris Lalović =

Montenegrin basketball player

Personal information
- Born: August 4, 1981 (age 45) Nikšić, Montenegro, SFR Yugoslavia
- Listed height: 2.07 m (6 ft 9 in)
- Listed weight: 108 kg (238 lb)

Career information
- Playing career: 2000–2021
- Position: Power forward
- Number: 22

Career history
- 2000–2005: Ibon Nikšić
- 2005–2006: Jedinstvo Bijelo Polje
- 2006–2007: Ulcinjska Rivijera Ulcinj
- 2007–2008: Mogren
- 2008–2009: Primorje
- 2009–2010: Ulcinjska Rivijera Ulcinj
- 2010–2011: Hercegovac Bileća
- 2011: InterCollege Etha Engomis
- 2012: Hercegovac Bileća
- 2012: Zrinjski Mostar
- 2012: Hemofarm
- 2012–2013: Zrinjski Mostar
- 2013–2015: U-Mobitelco Cluj Napoca
- 2015–2017: Atlassib Sibiu
- 2017–2021: Sutjeska

Boris Lalović (born August 4, 1981) is a Montenegrin former professional basketball player.
