= Second level basketball leagues in Bosnia and Herzegovina =

2nd-tier Bosnia and Herzegovina
- First season: 1993–94
- Country: Bosnia and Herzegovina
- Confederation: FIBA Europe
- Divisions: 3
- Level on pyramid: 2
- Promotion to: Basketball Championship
- Domestic cup(s): Republika Srpska Cup; Herzeg-Bosnia Cup
- Most championships: RS: Borac (7 titles); HB: Brotnjo (7); A1: Sloboda (6)
- Website: basket.ba

The Second level basketball leagues in Bosnia and Herzegovina are a 2nd-tier men's professional basketball competitions in Bosnia and Herzegovina. The tier is composed of three regional divisions: the A1 League (Bosnian: A1 Liga), the Herzeg-Bosnia League (Croatian: Liga Herceg-Bosne), and the First League of Republika Srpska (Serbian: Прва лига Републике Српске).

The A1 League, operated by the Sarajevo Basketball Association, has 14 teams. The Herzeg-Bosnia League, operated by the Herzeg-Bosnia Basketball Association, has 9 teams. The First League of Republika Srpska, operated by the Basketball Association of Republika Srpska, has 12 teams.

== History ==
The division champions of the 2nd-tier leagues in Bosnia and Herzegovina:

Season	A1 League	Herzeg-Bosnia League	First League of Rep. Srpska	Ref.
1993–94	Sloboda Dita	Čapljina Lasta	Borac Nektar	
1994–95	Zenica Metalno	Brotnjo	Borac Nektar (2)	
1995–96	Sloboda Dita (2)	Brotnjo (2)	Borac Nektar (3)	
1996–97	Sloboda Dita (3)	Brotnjo (3)	Borac Nektar (4)	
1997–98	Bosna	Široki	Borac Nektar (5)	
1998–99	Sloboda Dita (4)	Brotnjo (4)	Borac Nektar (6)	
1999–00	Sloboda Dita (5)	Brotnjo (5)	Igokea	
2000–01	Sloboda Dita (6)	Široki (2)	Igokea (2)	
2001–02	Bosna (2)	Široki (3)	Borac Nektar (7)	
2002–03	—N/a	Ljubuški (North) / Rama (South)	Leotar	
2003–04	Vogošća	Odžak (North) / Zrinjski (South)	Radnik	
2004–05	—N/a	Grude	Rudar	
2005–06	Zenica Čelik (2)	Brotnjo (6)	Slavija	
2006–07	Vogošća (2)	Čapljina Lasta (2)	Borac Nektar (1 or 8)	
2007–08	Novi Grad Atal Sarajevo	Vitez	Mladost	
2008–09	Zenica Čelik (3)	Čapljina Lasta (3)	Sutjeska	
2009–10	Kakanj	Brotnjo (7)	Varda	
2010–11	Triland	Grude (2)	Servitium	
2011–12	Kakanj (2)	Vitez (2)	Radnik (2)	
2012–13	Spars	Brotnjo (8)	Građanski	
2013–14	Zenica Čelik (4)	Vitez (3)	HEO	
2014–15	Bošnjak	Student Mostar	Radnik (3)	
2015–16	Bosna Royal (3)	Grude (3)	Prijedor	
2016–17	Vogošća (3)	Student Mostar (2)	Radnik (4)	
2017–18	Gradina	Grude (4)	Bratunac	
2018–19	Donji Vakuf	Čapljina Lasta (4)	Leotar (2)	
2019–20	All canceled due to the COVID-19 pandemic		Borac (2 or 9)	
2020–21	Bošnjak (2)	Posušje	Radnik (4)	
2021–22	Student Tuzla	Grude (5)	Budućnost BN	
2022–23	Orlovik	Rama	Prijedor (2)	
2023–24	Radnički	Mostar	Jahorina	
2024–25	KK Zivinice (North) / Basket Zivinice (South)	Zrinjski (2)	Student Igokea	
2025–26	Gradina (2)	Mostar (2)	Drina Princip	

== Current clubs ==
The following is the list of clubs for the 2019–20 season.

=== A1 League ===
Location of A1 League clubs in the 2019–20 season

Club	City
Bosna Royal	Sarajevo
Bošnjak	Hadžići
Brčko	Brčko
Čelik	Zenica
Gen Sarajevo	Sarajevo
Gračanica	Gračanica
Igman Burch University	Ilidža
IBU Spartans	Živinice
Konjic	Konjic
Travnik	Travnik
Turbina	Jablanica

=== Herzeg-Bosnia League ===
Location of the Herzeg-Bosnia League clubs in the 2019–20 season

Club	City
Brotnjo	Čitluk
Busovača	Busovača
Grude	Grude
Ljubuški	Ljubuški
Posušje	Posušje
Student Mostar	Mostar
Široki 2	Široki Brijeg
Tomislav	Tomislavgrad
Zrinjski 2	Mostar

=== First League of Republika Srpska ===
Location of the First League of Republika Srpska clubs in the 2021–22 season

Club	City	Venue
Akademac	Banja Luka	JU SC Borik
Bratunac	Bratunac	SD Bratunac
Budućnost BN	Bijeljina	OŠ Vuk Karadžić
Drina Princip	Zvornik	JU RSC Zvornik
HEO Bileća	Bileća	SD Tijana Bošković
Prijedor Spartak	Prijedor	SD Mladost
Radnik BNB	Bijeljina	OŠ Vuk Karadžić
Rogatica	Rogatica	SD Rogatica
Sloboda 73	Novi Grad	SD Novi Grad
Stars Basket	Gradiška	SD Arena
Student Igokea	Banja Luka	SD Nenad Baštinac Aleksandrovac
Sutjeska	Foča	SD Foča
Varda HE	Višegrad	SD Višegrad
