= OKK Borac =

Basketball club in Banja Luka, Bosnia and Herzegovina

Borac Banja Luka
- Leagues: Bosnian Championship; ABA League 2
- Founded: 1947; 79 years ago (disputed); 2006; 20 years ago
- History: KK Borac (disputed); 1947–2006; KK Borac Nektar; 2006–2011; OKK Borac; 2011–2018; KK Borac; 2018–present
- Arena: Borik Sports Hall
- Capacity: 3,060
- Location: Banja Luka, Bosnia and Herzegovina
- Team colors: Red and blue
- President: Milan Đajić
- General manager: Tibor Florjan
- Head coach: Zoran Kašćelan
- Website: kkborac.com

Košarkaški klub Borac (Serbian Cyrillic: Кошаркашки клуб Бopaц), commonly referred to as Borac Banja Luka, is a men's professional basketball club based in Banja Luka, Republika Srpska, Bosnia and Herzegovina. They are currently competing in the Championship of Bosnia and Herzegovina and the ABA League Second Division.

Borac also has a reserve team, called Borac Mako Print, that plays in the 3rd-tier Second League of Republika Srpska – Western Division.

This club is not a part of the Borac Banja Luka Sports Society, like SKK Borac 1947.

== History ==
In 2006, the club changed its name to Borac Nektar after SKK Banjalučka pivara got relegated from Bosnian Championship and folded.

In 2020, Borac got promoted to the Championship of Bosnia and Herzegovina for the 2020–21 season. The club returned to the 1st-tier national league for the first time since the 2012–13 season. On 15 September 2020, the club signed a contract on sports and technical cooperation with the Adriatic League club Igokea. On 13 October 2020, the club received a wild card for the 2020–21 ABA League 2 season.

== Home arena ==
Borac plays its home games at the Borik Sports Hall. The hall is located in the Borik Neighbourhood, Banja Luka, and was built in 1974. It has a seating capacity of 3,060 seats.

== Players ==
=== Current roster ===
Note: Flags indicate national team eligibility at FIBA-sanctioned events. Players may hold other non-FIBA nationalities not displayed.

Borac Banja Luka roster
Players
Coaches

Pos.	No.	Nat.	Name	Ht.	Age
SG	0	(Bosnia and Herzegovina)	Gavrić, Srđan	1.96 m (6 ft 5 in)	30 – 12 May 1995
PF	1	(United States)	Cunningham, Joshua	2.05 m (6 ft 9 in)	29 – 11 August 1996
SG	4	(Bosnia and Herzegovina)	Dragojević, Boris	1.94 m (6 ft 4 in)	23 – 1 March 2002
PG	7	(Bosnia and Herzegovina)	Knežević, Draško	1.85 m (6 ft 1 in)	33 – 3 February 1993
F	10	(Bosnia and Herzegovina)	Sikiraš, Njegoš	2.06 m (6 ft 9 in)	26 – 11 April 1999
C	15	(Serbia)	Šešlija, Radoš	2.08 m (6 ft 10 in)	34 – 4 February 1992
F	34	(Bosnia and Herzegovina)	Bošković, Vuk	2.00 m (6 ft 7 in)	22 – 21 July 2003
G/F	36	(Bosnia and Herzegovina)	Janković, Aljoša	2.02 m (6 ft 8 in)	26 – 8 February 1999
C	55	(Bosnia and Herzegovina)	Reljić, Nemanja	2.08 m (6 ft 10 in)	25 – 25 June 2000
C	-	(Croatia)	Buljević, Lovro	2.10 m (6 ft 11 in)	27 – 12 August 1998
SF	-	(Bosnia and Herzegovina)	Delalić, Amsal (L)	2.02 m (6 ft 8 in)	22 – 24 July 2003
SG	-	(Slovenia)	Rebec, Jan	1.92 m (6 ft 4 in)	32 – 17 February 1993
SF	-	(Bosnia and Herzegovina)	Lakić, Stefan	2.03 m (6 ft 8 in)	31 – 12 January 1995
PF	-	(Serbia)	Langović, Aleksandar	2.03 m (6 ft 8 in)	24 – 19 February 2001

Head coach

- (Montenegro) Zoran Kašćelan

Assistant coach(es)

- (Bosnia and Herzegovina) Nemanja Tomić

Legend

- (C) Team captain
- Injured

- Roster
Updated: August 10, 2022

== Head coaches ==
- (Bosnia and Herzegovina) Drago Karalić (2006–2007)
- (Bosnia and Herzegovina) Tomica Zirojević (2007, interim)
- (Serbia) Slobodan Nikolić (2007–2008)
- (Serbia) Miloš Pejić (2008–2009)
- (Bosnia and Herzegovina) Bojan Božić (2009)
- (Serbia) Borislav Džaković (2009–2010)
- (Bosnia and Herzegovina) Drago Karalić (2010–2015)
- (Bosnia and Herzegovina) Bojan Božić (2015–2018)
- (Bosnia and Herzegovina) Marko Taušan (2018)
- (Bosnia and Herzegovina) Dragan Mičić (2018–2019)
- (Bosnia and Herzegovina) Marko Šćekić (2019–2020)
- (Serbia) Dragan Nikolić (2020–2022)
- (Montenegro) Zoran Kašćelan (2022–present)

== Season-by-season ==
Season	Tier	Division	Pos.	Postseason	W–L	National Cup	Adriatic league			European competitions		
2006–07	2	First League of R Srpska	1	Champions		—N/a	—			—		
2007–08	1	BH Championship	5	—	20–18	Runners up	—			—		
2008–09	1	BH Championship	6	—	17–21	—N/a	—			FIBA EuroChallenge	QR	0–2
2009–10	1	BH Championship	7	—	9–13	—N/a	—			—		
2010–11	1	BH Championship	4	—	21–13	—N/a	—			—		
2011–12	1	BH Championship	9	—	8–16	—N/a	—			—		
2012–13	1	BH Championship	10	—	9–13	—N/a	—			—		
2013–14	2	First League of R Srpska	3	Semifinalist		—N/a	—			—		
2014–15	2	First League of R Srpska	3	Semifinalist	15–10	—N/a	—			—		
2015–16	2	First League of R Srpska	7	—	8–19	—N/a	—			—		
2016–17	2	First League of R Srpska	8	—	12–14	—	—			—		
2017–18	2	First League of R Srpska	3	Runners up	20–9	—	—			—		
2018–19	2	First League of R Srpska	1	Runners up	23–7	—	—			—		
2019–20	2	First League of R Srpska	1	NH	18–1	—	—			—		
2020–21	1	BH Championship	4	DFR	20–13	—	ABA League 2	QF	10–5	—		
2021–22	1	BH Championship	3	Liga6 5	21–11	—	ABA League 2	SF	10–5	—		
2022–23	1	BH Championship	2	Runners up	22–11	—	ABA League 2	QF	9–5	—		
2023–24	1	BH Championship	2	Runners up	23–14	—	ABA League 2	RS	6–7	—		
2024–25	1	BH Championship	2	Fourth place	23–13	—	ABA League 2	RS	3–3	—		

== Trophies and awards ==
=== Trophies ===
Honours		No.	Years
National competitions – 2
Bosnian-Herzegovinian Championship	Winners	1	1999–2000
Bosnian-Herzegovinian Cup	Winners	1	1999–2000
Competitions of Republika Srpska (2nd-tier) – 19
R Srpska First League	Winners	9	1993–94, 1994–95, 1995–96, 1996–97, 1997–98, 1998–99, 2001–02, 2006–07, 2019–20
R Srpska Cup	Winners	10	1993–94, 1994–95, 1995–96, 1996–97, 1997–98, 1998–99, 2001–02, 2006–07, 2008–09, 2021–22

Trophies in Italic text indicates those which are under ongoing dispute with SKK Borac 1947.

== Notable players ==
- (Bosnia and Herzegovina) Draško Albijanić
- (Bosnia and Herzegovina) Siniša Kovačević
- (Israel) Robert Rothbart
- (Montenegro) Nemanja Vranješ
- (Serbia) Ognjen Kuzmić
- (United States) Jon Davis
