= Mokronoge massacre =

1993 mass killing during the Bosnian War

- Part of the Croat-Muslim War
- Mokronoge (Bosnia and Herzegovina)
- Location: 43°45′51″N 17°13′33″E; Mokronoge near Tomislavgrad, Bosnia and Herzegovina
- Date: 10 August 1993 (Central European Time)
- Target: Muslims
- Attack type: Mass killing
- Deaths: 9
- Perpetrator: Ivan Baković

The Mokronoge massacre was the mass killing of nine Muslim civilians in the village of Mokronoge, Tomislavgrad in Bosnia and Herzegovina. It was committed on 10 August 1993 by Ivan Baković, a soldier of the Croatian Defence Council (HVO) during the Croat-Muslim War. In November 1999, the Municipal Court of Zagreb found Ivan Baković guilty in absentia and sentenced him to 15 year imprisonment. After Ivan Baković was arrested, he was also tried in the Cantonal Court in Livno and found guilty of war crimes committed against the civilian population. In 2004, he was sentenced to 15 year imprisonment.

== Massacre ==
The explanation of the verdict of the Municipal Court in Zagreb, with Ranko Marijan as a presiding judge, stated that Ivan Baković, also known as Ikač, appeared together with at least one unidentified person on 10 August 1993 in the village of Mokronoge, at the doorstep of the Bešlaga family's house. Armed with an automatic and a machine-gun and wearing fatigues, he entered the house and aimed their weapons at Husein, Emir, Subha, Emira and Dika Bešlaga, Ibrahim, Muharem, and Mustafa Tiro, as well as at Sinha Đuliman. He ordered them to get out of the house. Together with his accessory, holding the victims at gunpoint, he took them to a nearby forest, some 500 meters away, and ordered them to lie on the ground, face down. Then, the two assailants fired at least 33 shots from the automatic gun and 51 shots from the machine gun. All nine victims were killed on the spot.

During the presentation of evidence before the court, the most relevant was the testimony of minor Amela Bešlaga, who recognized the murderer on the night he came to their house. Baković had been her father's best man at his wedding. When Baković ordered them to lie down, her mother implored him: "Don't do that brother Ivan. Your dad was a good man". Baković replied: "He might have been good, but I am an Ustaša", and took them out of the house.
