= HKK Posušje =

Basketball team

Posušje
- Leagues: Basketball Championship of Bosnia and Herzegovina
- Founded: 1975; 50 years ago
- Arena: Gradska sportska dvorana Posušje
- Location: Posušje
- Team colors: Yellow and black
Home	Away

Hrvatski Košarkaški Klub Posušje (also known simply as Košarkaški Klub Posušje) is a basketball team from the town of Posušje, Bosnia and Herzegovina. It currently competes in the Basketball Championship of Bosnia and Herzegovina, the top tier basketball league of Bosnia and Herzegovina.

== History ==
The club was founded in 1975 as KK Polivinil. The team stopped its activities because of the war. In 1994 it was reestablished as HKK Posušje, and started competing in the Herzeg-Bosnia League, finishing third in the inaugural season. It played in the 1999–2000 FIBA Korać Cup. In 2021 the club won back promotion to the top tier league.

== Honours ==
- Herzeg-Bosnia Basketball League
  - Winners (3): 2012, 2016, 2021
  - Runner-Up (5): 2010, 2012, 2017, 2018, 2020

== Notable players ==
Note: Flags indicate national team eligibility at FIBA-sanctioned events. Players may hold other non-FIBA nationalities not displayed.

Criteria

To appear in this section a player must have either:

- Set a club record or won an individual award while at the club
- Played at least one official international match for their national team at any time
- Played at least one official NBA match at any time.

- (Croatia) Ivan Ramljak

== Coaching history ==
- (Croatia) Ante Nazor
- Tihomir Mustapić
- Robert Jurišić
- (Croatia) Josip Plantak
