= Laktaši Sports Hall =

Sports arena in Laktaši, Bosnia and Herzegovina

Laktaši Sports Hall Спортска дворана Лакташи
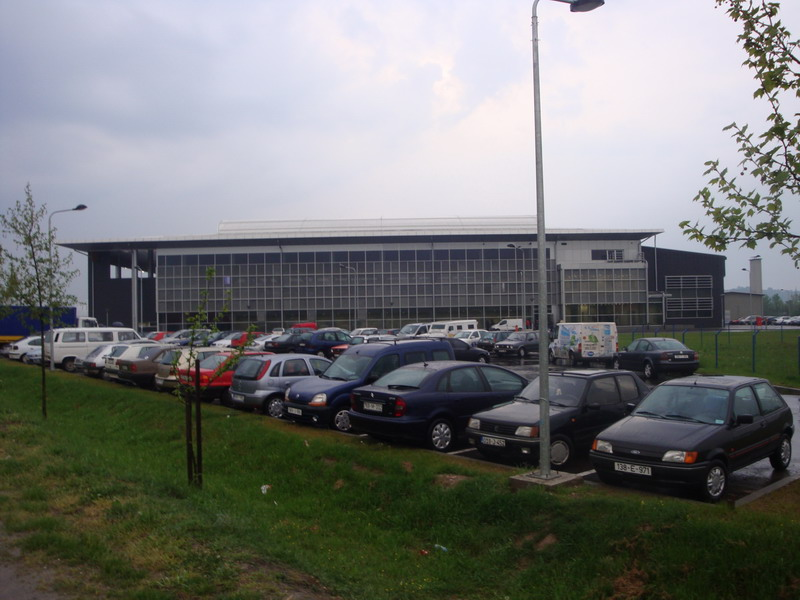
- Interactive map of Laktaši Sports Hall; Спортска дворана Лакташи
- Location: Nemanjina, Laktaši 78250, Bosnia and Herzegovina
- Coordinates: 44°54′26″N 17°18′29″E
- Capacity: 3,050

Construction
- Opened: October 6, 2010
- Cost: €7.5 Million

Tenant
- KK Igokea

Laktaši Sports Hall (Bosnian: Спортска дворана Лакташи, romanized: Sportska dvorana Laktaši) is an indoor sporting arena located in Laktaši, Bosnia and Herzegovina. The seating capacity of the arena is 3,050 spectators for sporting events.

It is home to the KK Igokea basketball team.
