= First League of Republika Srpska (basketball) =

- Founded: 1993
- First season: 1993-1994
- Country: Bosnia and Herzegovina
- Confederation: FIBA Europe
- Number of teams: 13
- Level on pyramid: 2
- Promotion to: Basketball Championship
- Relegation to: Second League of Republika Srpska
- Domestic cup: Republika Srpska Cup
- Current champions: Drina Princip (2025–26)
- Most championships: Borac 1947 (9 titles)
- Website: basket.ba ks.rs.ba
- 2025-26

The First League of Republika Srpska (Serbian: Прва лига Републике Српске, Prva liga Republike Srpske), referred to as the Meridianbet Prva muška liga RS for sponsorship reasons, is a 1st-tier men's professional basketball competition in Republika Srpska, Bosnia and Herzegovina. It is one of three regional 2nd-tier divisions in Bosnia and Herzegovina.

Before the creation of the Republika Srpska League, teams from this region participated in the Championships of the Federal Republic of Yugoslavia and the Championships of the SFR Yugoslavia.

The First League, operated by the Basketball Federation of Republika Srpska, has 13 teams. Borac Banja Luka holds the record for the most titles, with nine.

== History ==
Following the dissolution of the League of the Socialist Federal Republic of Yugoslavia in 1992, Borac Banja Luka played in the First Division of the Federal Republic of Yugoslavia during the 1992–93 season. However, Borac played their home matches in Ruma and Jagodina. In addition to Yugoslav competitions, tournaments were also held in the Republika Srpska. On 16 and 17 October 1993, the final tournament of the Republika Srpska Championship was held in Banja Luka. With victories over Semberija (100–62) and Orlovi (101–93), Borac became the first champion of the Republika Srpska.

== Competition System ==
The championship consists of two phases:

First Phase

This phase corresponds to the league stage of the tournament, which is played under a double round-robin system (one home match and one away match).

Second Phase (Play-Offs)

This phase involves the four highest-ranked teams after the league stage. The winner of the Play-Offs becomes the champion of Republika Srpska and secures a place in the First League of BiH. Based on their ranking in the Bosnia and Herzegovina Championship, clubs from Republika Srpska may also qualify for the Adriatic League.

== Current clubs ==
The following is the list of clubs for the 2024–25 season.

Location of the First League of Republika Srpska clubs in the 2021–22 season

Club	City	Venue
Akademac	Banja Luka	JU SC Borik
Bratunac	Bratunac	SD Bratunac
Budućnost BN	Bijeljina	OŠ Vuk Karadžić
Drina Princip	Zvornik	JU RSC Zvornik
HEO Bileća	Bileća	SD Tijana Bošković
Prijedor Spartak	Prijedor	SD Mladost
Radnik BNB	Bijeljina	OŠ Vuk Karadžić
Rogatica	Rogatica	SD Rogatica
Sloboda 73	Novi Grad	SD Novi Grad
Stars Basket	Gradiška	SD Arena
Student Igokea	Banja Luka	SD Nenad Baštinac Aleksandrovac
Sutjeska	Foča	SD Foča
Varda HE	Višegrad	SD Višegrad

== Seasons ==
The following is a list of champions of the First League of Republika Srpska:

Season	Champion	Result	Runner-up	Champion's Coach
1993–94	Borac Nektar	101–93	Orlovi	
1994–95	Borac Nektar	League (Note: A 3-team tournament was played. Other teams were Potkozarje and Drina.)	—N/a	(Republika Srpska) Slobodan Simović
1995–96	Borac Nektar	125–69	Potkozarje	(Serbia and Montenegro) Velimir Gašić
1996–97	Borac Nektar	League (Note: A 4-team tournament was played. Other teams were Leotar, Mladost and Drina.)	—N/a	
1997–98	Borac Nektar	2–0	Leotar	(Serbia and Montenegro) Miodrag Baletić
1998–99	Borac Nektar	2–0	Doboj putevi Modriča	(Bosnia and Herzegovina) Drago Karalić
1999–00	Igokea	2–1	Borac Nektar	
2000–01	Igokea	2–0	Borac Nektar	(Federal Republic of Yugoslavia) Jovica Antonić
2001–02	Borac Nektar	2–0	Igokea	
2002–03	Leotar	2–0	Rudar	
2003–04	Radnik	2–1	Rudar	
2004–05	Rudar	2–1	Slavija	
2005–06	Slavija	2–1	Drina Birač	
2006–07	Borac Nektar (OKK Borac)	2–1	Mladost	(Bosnia and Herzegovina) Drago Karalić
2007–08	Mladost	2–0	Radnik	
2008–09	Sutjeska	2–1	Bratunac Mins	
2009–10	Varda	2–1	Servitium	(Bosnia and Herzegovina) Ilija Vidaković
2010–11	Servitium	2–0	Sutjeska	(Bosnia and Herzegovina) Dragan Mičić
2011–12	Radnik	2–0	Građanski	(Serbia) Predrag Jaćimović
2012–13	Građanski	2–0	HEO	(Serbia) Ivan Smiljanić
2013–14	HEO	2–1	Sutjeska	
2014–15	Radnik	2–1	Rogatica	(Bosnia and Herzegovina) Igor Mihajlović
2015–16	Prijedor	3–1	Student Igokea	(Bosnia and Herzegovina) Danilo Palalić
2016–17	Radnik	3–2	Sutjeska	(Serbia) Branislav Vićentić
2017–18	Bratunac	3–1	Borac (OKK Borac)	(Bosnia and Herzegovina) Milivoje Mađenović
2018–19	Leotar	3–2	Borac (OKK Borac)	(Bosnia and Herzegovina) Dražen Šegrt
2019–20	Borac (OKK Borac)	League (Note: The season was concluded after the premature ending of the league due to the COVID-19 pandemic in Bosnia and Herzegovina.)	HEO	(Bosnia and Herzegovina) Marko Šćekić
2020–21	Radnik	3–2	Drina Princip	(Bosnia and Herzegovina) Vladimir Radovanović
2021–22	Budućnost BN	3–1	Slavija 1996	(Bosnia and Herzegovina) Josip Pandža
2022–23	Prijedor	3–1	Rogatica	(Bosnia and Herzegovina) Danilo Palalić
2023–24	Jahorina	3–0	Budućnost Profi	
2024–25	Student Igokea	3–0	Prijedor	
2025–26	Drina Princip	3–1	Radnik	(Bosnia and Herzegovina) Vladan Erić

== Titles by club ==
Club	Champion	Champion years
KK Borac Nektar	9	1993, 1994/95, 1995/96, 1996/97, 1997/98, 1998/99, 2001/02, 2006/07, 2019/20
KK Radnik Bijeljina	5	2003/04, 2011/12, 2014/15, 2016/17, 2020/21
KK Igokea	2	1999/00, 2000/01
KK Leotar	2	2002/03, 2018/19
KK Prijedor	2	2015/16, 2022/23
KK Rudar Ugljevik	1	2004/05
KK Slavija IS	1	2005/06
KK Mladost Mrkonjić Grad	1	2007/08
KK Sutjeska Foča	1	2008/09
KK Varda HE	1	2009/10
KK Servicijum	1	2010/11
KK Građanski Bijeljina	1	2012/13
KK Heo	1	2013/14
KK Bratunac	1	2017/18
KK Budućnost BN	1	2021/22
KK Jahorina	1	2023/24
Student Igokea	1	2024/25
OKK Drina Princip	1	2025/26

== See also ==
- First Women's League of Republika Srpska in basketball
- Basketball Federation of Republika Srpska
- Republika Srpska national basketball team
- First League of the Republika Srpska (Association football)
