= KK Vogošća =

- Leagues: Basketball Championship of Bosnia and Herzegovina
- Founded: 1972
- Arena: Sportska Dvorana Amel Bečković (capacity: 1,000)
- Location: Vogošća, Bosnia and Herzegovina
- Team colors: Red and White
- Head coach: Hamdo Frljak, Haris Tanjo
- Championships: 2 (2004, 2007)

KK Vogošća is a professional basketball club from Vogošća, Bosnia and Herzegovina. They currently play in the Basketball Championship of Bosnia and Herzegovina.

== Trophies and awards ==
- Bosnian A1 League (2nd-tier)
  - Winners (3): 2003–04, 2006–07, 2016–17
