= HKK Čapljina Lasta =

- Leagues: Basketball Championship of Bosnia and Herzegovina
- Founded: 1973
- Arena: Športska Dvorana Čapljina
- Capacity: 1,000
- Location: Čapljina, Bosnia and Herzegovina
- Team colours: Blue and white
- Head coach: Josip Jelčić
- Website: hkkcapljina.webs.com
Home	Away

HKK Čapljina Lasta (Croatian: Hrvatski košarkaški klub Čapljina, English: Croatian Basketball Club Čapljina) is a professional basketball team from Čapljina, Bosnia and Herzegovina. It competes in the Basketball Championship of Bosnia and Herzegovina.

== History ==
HKK Čapljina Lasta was founded as KK Borac - Čapljina in 1973. The first official game was played against "Mladost" - Lištica (today HKK Široki). Its biggest success was promotion to Yugoslav First B Federal Basketball League. The club stopped competing with the start of the Bosnian War. In 1993 the team was renamed to HKK Čapljina Lasta, and started competing in the Herzeg-Bosnia Basketball League winning the inaugural season.

== Honours ==
- Herzeg-Bosnia Basketball League
  - Winner (4): 1994, 2007, 2008, 2019

== Notable players ==
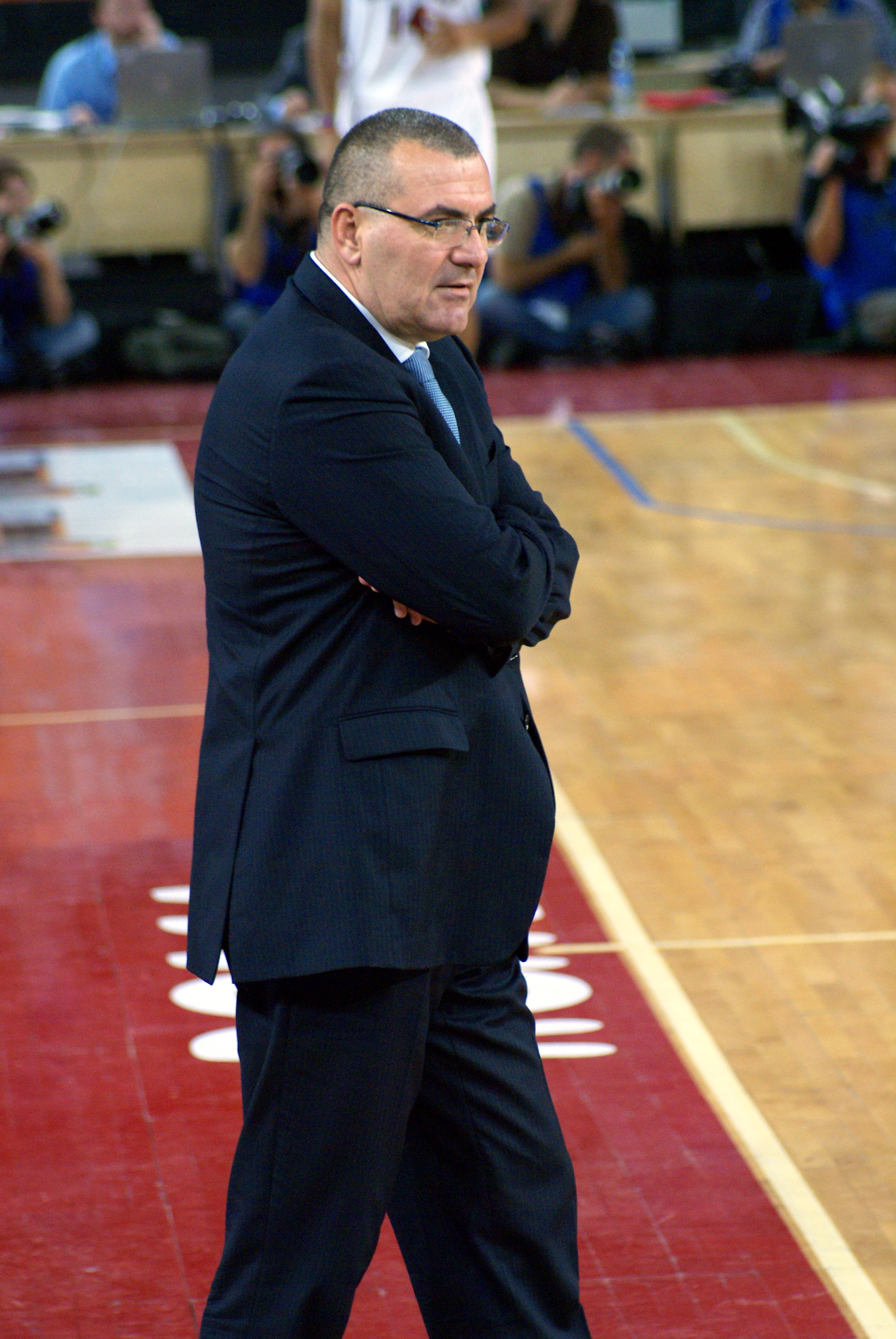
Jasmin Repeša started his basketball career in Čapljina

Note: Flags indicate national team eligibility at FIBA-sanctioned events. Players may hold other non-FIBA nationalities not displayed.

Criteria

To appear in this section a player must have either:

- Set a club record or won an individual award while at the club
- Played at least one official international match for their national team at any time
- Played at least one official NBA match at any time.

- (Albania) Gerti Shima
- (Croatia) Dragan Bender
- (Croatia) Jasmin Repeša
- (Croatia) Veljko Mršić
