= KK Varda Višegrad =

- Leagues: National Championship of Bosnia and Herzegovina
- Arena: Višegrad City Hall
- Capacity: 1,500
- Location: Višegrad, Republika Srpska
- Team colors: White and Blue
- President: Ilija Vidaković
- Head coach: Borko Pereula

Košarkaški klub Varda (Serbian Cyrillic: Кошаркашки клуб Варда) is a professional basketball club from Višegrad, Republika Srpska, Bosnia and Herzegovina. The club currently participates in the Basketball Championship of Bosnia and Herzegovina. Players 25/26: Nenad Rosic, David Djokovic, Dimitrije Bradonjic, Jovan Krunic, Ognjen Djurovic, Henry Abraham, Alexander Terentyev, Robert Littlejohn, Vasilije Kujundzic, Milorad Milkanovic, Vuk Vukadin, Danijel Rebic, Pavle Jakovljevic, Novak Djeric, Luka Kusmuk, Nikola Masal.
