= KK Kakanj =

Basketball club in Kakanj, Bosnia and Herzegovina

Kakanj
- Leagues: Bosnia and Herzegovina Championship
- Founded: 1950; 76 years ago
- History: KK Kakanj; 1950–present
- Arena: KSC Kakanj Sports Hall
- Capacity: 1,300
- Location: Kakanj, Bosnia and Herzegovina
- Team colors: Green and white
- Head coach: Benjamin Šabić

Košarkaški klub Kakanj (transl. Kakanj Basketball Club), commonly referred to as KK Kakanj, is a men's professional basketball club based in Kakanj, Zenica-Doboj Canton, Bosnia and Herzegovina. They are currently competing in the Bosnia and Herzegovina Championship.

== History ==
The club won the 2nd-tier A1 League in the 2011–12 season and got promoted to Bosnia and Herzegovina Championship for the 2012–13 season.

== Home arena ==
Kakanj plays its home games at the KSC Kakanj Sports Hall. The hall is located in Kakanj, Zenica-Doboj Canton, and was built in 1985. It has a seating capacity of 1,300 seats.

== Head coaches ==
- (Bosnia and Herzegovina) Jakub Genjac (2011–2012)
- (Serbia) Radomir Kisić (2013)
- (Bosnia and Herzegovina) Josip Pandža (2013–2018)
- (Bosnia and Herzegovina) Benjamin Šabić (2018–present)

Sezona 2015/16 Prvaci Lige 12 najboljeg ranga BH Košarke

== See also ==
- OK Kakanj (volleyball club)
