= KK Leotar =

Basketball club in Trebinje, Bosnia and Herzegovina

Leotar
- Leagues: Bosnia and Herzegovina Championship
- Founded: 1948; 78 years ago
- History: DTV Partizan; 1948–1974; KK Leotar; 1974–present
- Arena: Miloš Mrdić Sports Hall
- Capacity: 4,000
- Location: Trebinje, Bosnia and Herzegovina
- Team colors: Blue and white
- Head coach: [ Đorđe Mišeljić
- Website: kkleotar.com

Košarkaški klub Leotar (Serbian Cyrillic: Кошаркашки клуб Леотар, transl. Leotar Basketball Club), commonly referred to as KK Leotar or Leotar Trebinje, is a men's professional basketball club based in Trebinje, Republika Srpska, Bosnia and Herzegovina. They are currently competing in the Bosnia and Herzegovina Championship.

== History ==
The club is formed in 1948 as DTV Partizan and renamed as KK Leotar in 1974 after the mountain located just north of Trebinje.

The club won the First League of Republika Srpska in the 2018–19 season and got promoted to Bosnia and Herzegovina Championship for the 2019–20 season.

== Sponsorship naming ==
The club has had several denominations through the years due to its sponsorship:

- SL IAT Leotar (2008–2011)
- SL Takovo Leotar (2011–2012)
- Swisslion Leotar (2015–2017)

== Home arena ==
Leotar plays its home games at the Miloš Mrdić Sports Hall. The hall is located in the Bregovi Neighbourhood in Trebinje. It has a seating capacity of 4,000 seats.

== Players ==
=== Current roster ===
Note: Flags indicate national team eligibility at FIBA sanctioned events. Players may hold other non-FIBA nationality not displayed.

No.		Position	Player
7	(Bosnia and Herzegovina)	SF	Božo Đurasović
10	(Bosnia and Herzegovina)	SF	Nikola Đurasović

== Head coaches ==
- (Socialist Federal Republic of Yugoslavia) Rade Aleksić
- (Serbia) Aleksandar Glišić (2006–2007)
- (Serbia) Petar Rodić (2007)
- (Serbia) Miroslav Popov (2007–2008)
- (Serbia) Radomir Kisić (2008–2012)
- (Serbia) Marko Ičelić (2013–2014)
- (Serbia) Dragoljub Vidačić (2014–2016)
- (Serbia) Vuk Stanimirović
- (Bosnia and Herzegovina) Dražen Šegrt (2018–2019)
- (Bosnia and Herzegovina) Miro Vukoje (2019–2021)
- (Serbia) Marko Ičelić (2021–present)

== Trophies and awards ==
- First League of Republika Srpska (2nd-tier)
  - Winners (2): 2002–03, 2018–19

== See also ==
- FK Leotar (football club)
