= HKK Zrinjski Mostar =

Basketball team from the city of Mostar, Bosnia and Herzegovina

Zrinjski Mostar
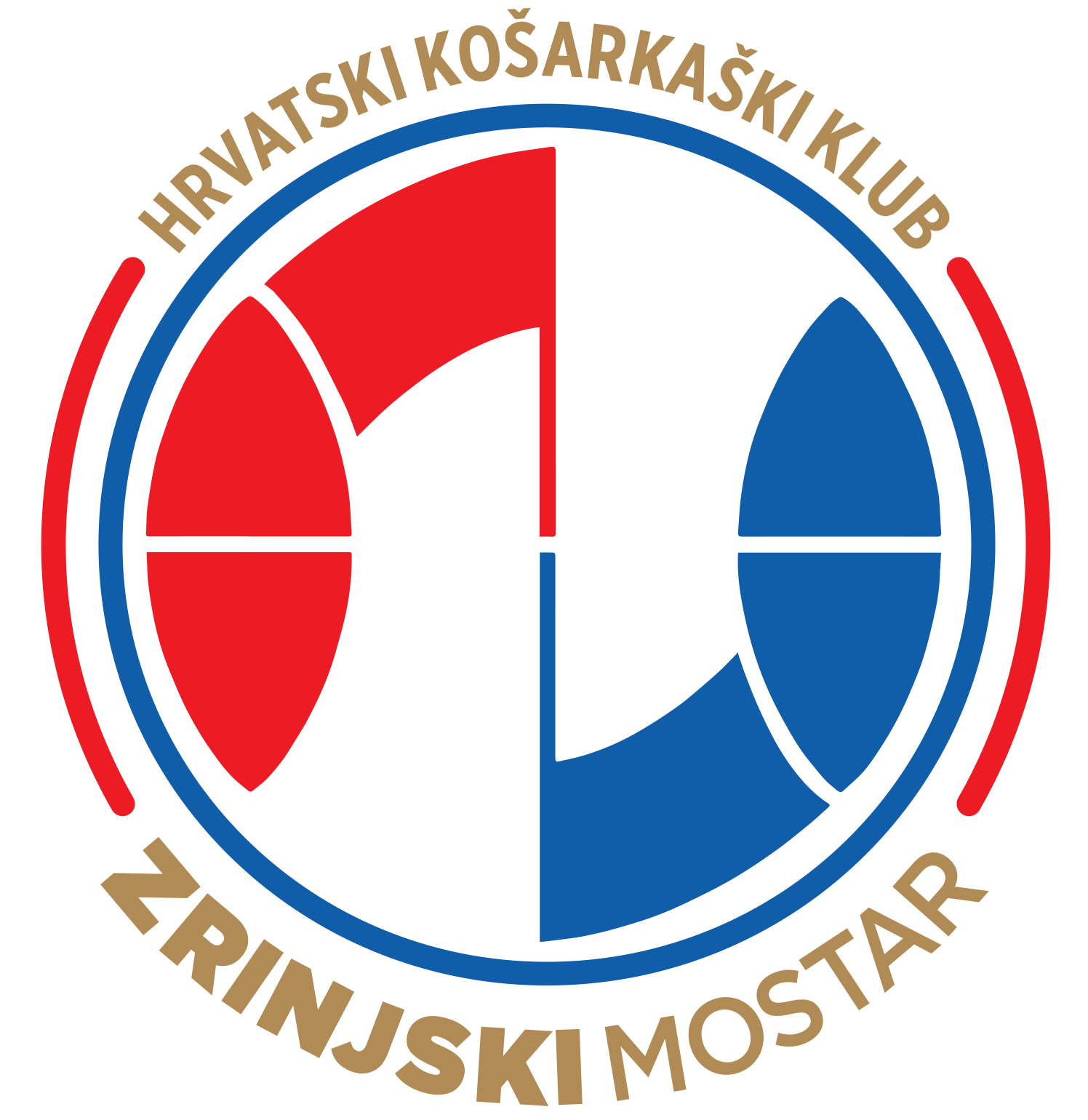
- Nickname: Plemići (Noblemen)
- Leagues: Basketball Championship of Bosnia and Herzegovina; Adriatic League
- Founded: 23 October 1992; 32 years ago
- Arena: Bijeli Brijeg Hall
- Capacity: 1,000
- Location: Mostar, Bosnia and Herzegovina
- Team colors: White and Red
- President: Igor Marić
- Head coach: Aleksandar Virijević
- Championships: 1 Bosnian Championship
- Website: www.hkkzrinjski.info
Home	Away

HKK Zrinjski Mostar (Croatian: Hrvatski košarkaški klub Zrinjski Mostar, English: Croat Basketball Club Zrinjski Mostar) is a basketball team from the city of Mostar, Bosnia and Herzegovina. The club plays in the Basketball Championship of Bosnia and Herzegovina.

== History ==
The club is part of the Zrinjski Mostar sport society. Since the national championship was formed in 1997, it has spent all but two seasons in the top league: the inaugural season and the 2003–04 season. For the 2003–04 season, Zrinjski was relegated to the regional Croatian league, but bounced back the following year to return to the top level of play. Since its return to the national championship it has placed in the top half of the table as well as reaching the semifinals in the national cup twice.

The club's current coach is Zoran Glomazić. A feeder club, often known as Zrinjski II, plays in the lower Croatian league. Fans of HKK Zrinjski are known as Ultras.

In 2018, the club won their first National league title.

== Achievements ==
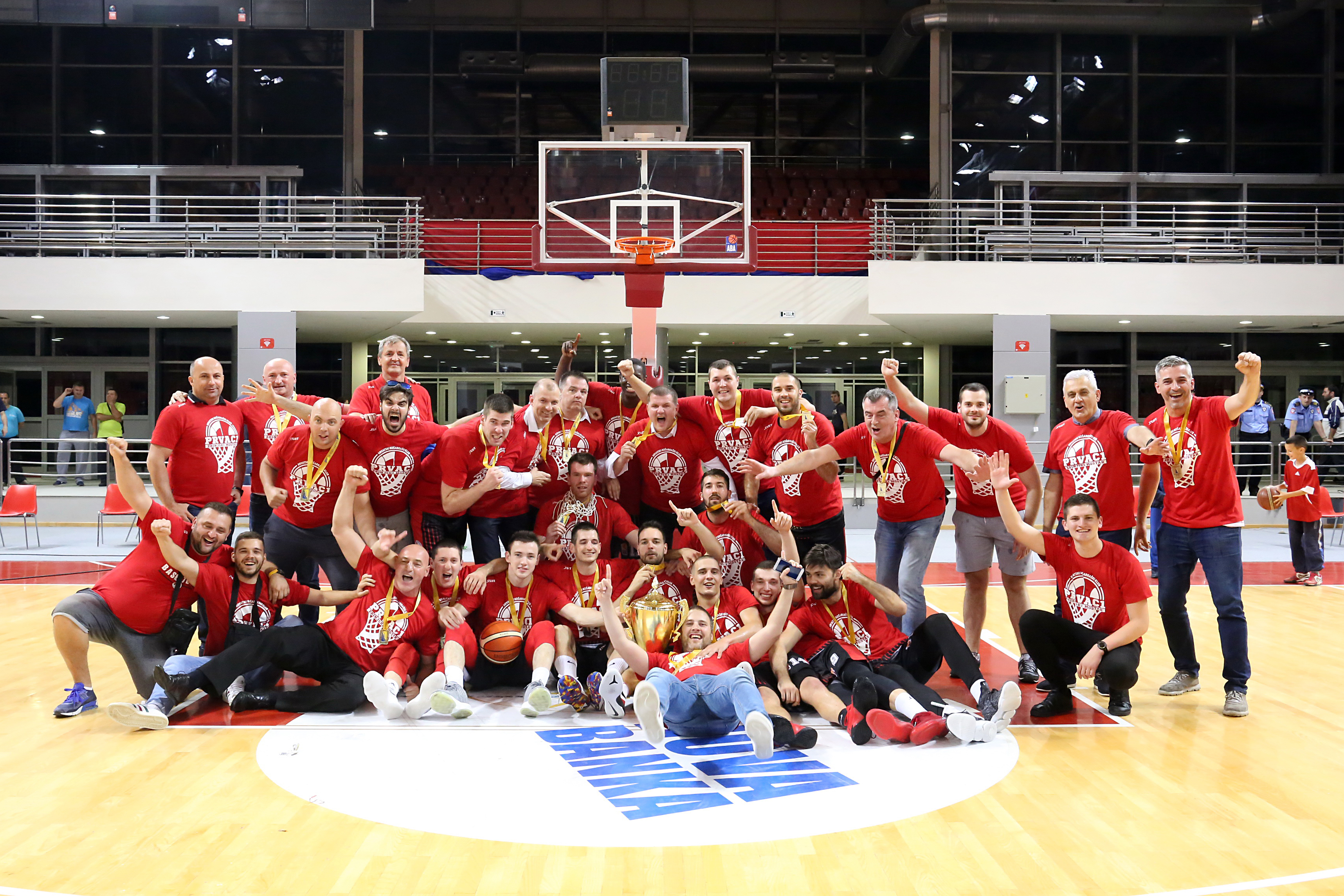
Zrinjski team after winning the 2018 Championship

- Basketball Championship of Bosnia and Herzegovina
  - Champions (1): 2017–18
- A1 League of Herzeg Bosnia
  - Champions (1): 2003–04

== Players ==
=== Current roster ===
Note: Flags indicate national team eligibility at FIBA-sanctioned events. Players may hold other non-FIBA nationalities not displayed.

Zrinjski Mostar roster
Players
Coaches

Pos.	No.	Nat.	Name	Ht.	Age
G	7	(Bosnia and Herzegovina)	Petrić, Mario	1.90 m (6 ft 3 in)	30 – 19 September 1994
SG	9	(Croatia)	Smajlagić, Sven	1.96 m (6 ft 5 in)	34 – 5 June 1990
C	12	(Bosnia and Herzegovina)	Golemac, Josip	2.03 m (6 ft 8 in)	27 – 3 April 1997
PF	13	(Bosnia and Herzegovina)	Zlomislić, Ivan	2.03 m (6 ft 8 in)	25 – 6 July 1999
PF	18	(Croatia)	Miličević, Ivan	2.04 m (6 ft 8 in)	29 – 31 December 1995
SG	21	(Croatia)	Pandurić, Luka	1.93 m (6 ft 4 in)	31 – 15 September 1993
C	22	(Montenegro)	Ljujić, Marko	2.07 m (6 ft 9 in)	37 – 13 January 1988
F	23	(Croatia)	Milinović, Denis	2.04 m (6 ft 8 in)	25 – 13 August 1999
G		(Serbia)	Anđušić, Luka	1.96 m (6 ft 5 in)	30 – 3 September 1994

Head coach

- (Croatia) Neven Nikolić

Assistant coach(es)

- (Bosnia and Herzegovina) Tihomir Mustapić
- (Bosnia and Herzegovina) Miran Pehar

Legend

- (C) Team captain
- Injured

- Roster
Updated: July 20, 2019

== Notable former players ==
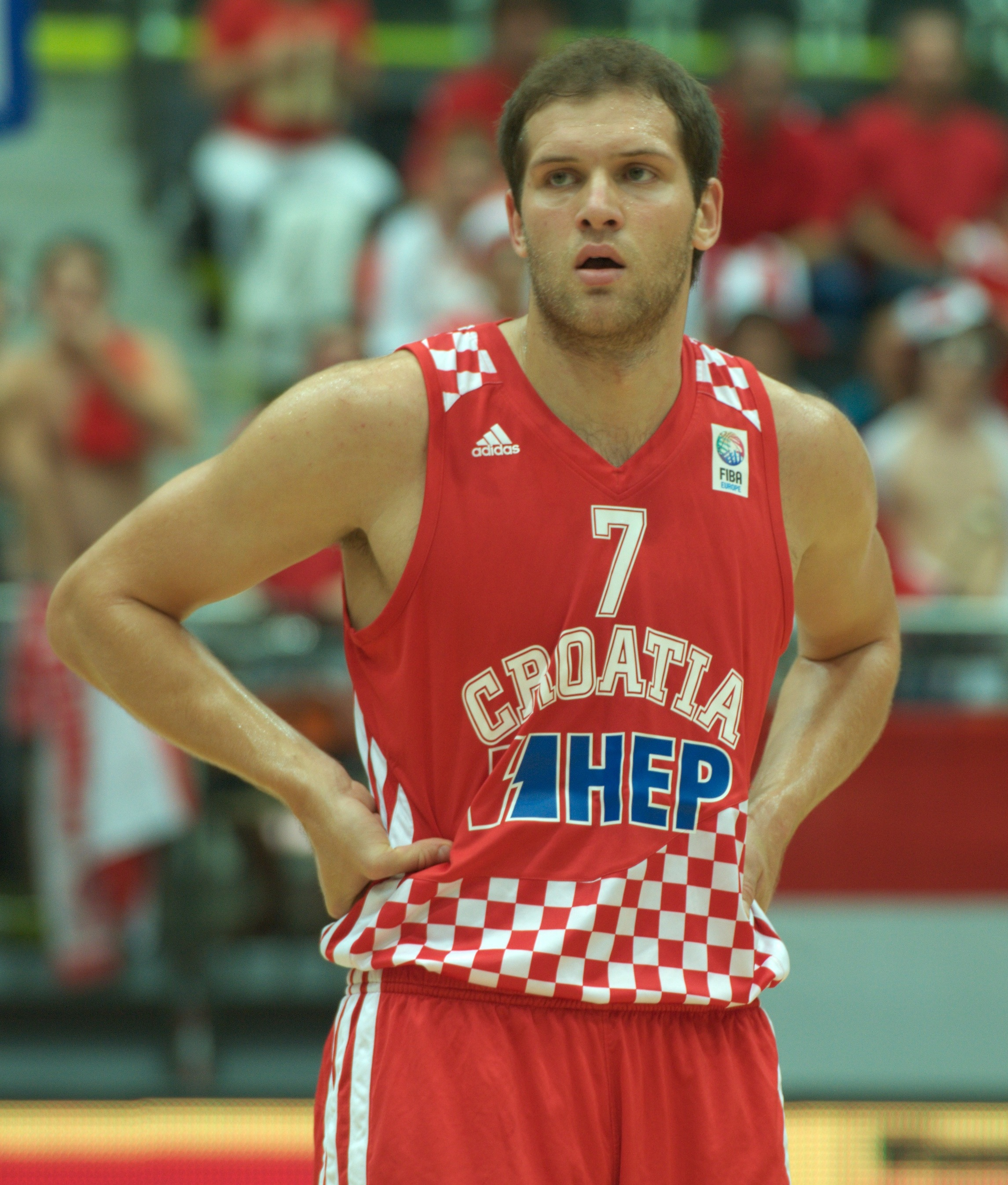
Bojan Bogdanović started his basketball career in Zrinjski.

- Josip Sesar
- Bojan Bogdanović
- Marin Rozić
- Pero Dujmović
- Željko Šakić
- Ante Mašić

== Notable former coaches ==
- Nedjeljko Zelenika
- Rudolf Jugo
- Dejan Parežanin
- Boris Džidić
- Ivan Vujičić
- Zoran Glomazić
- Senad Muminović
