= 2017–18 ABA League Second Division =

ABA League Second Division
- Season: 2017–18
- Dates: October 10, 2017–March 26, 2018 (Regular season); April 3, 2018–April 4, 2018 (Final Four)
- Teams: 12 (competition proper); 16 (total)

Regular season
- Top seed: (Serbia) Borac Čačak
- Season MVP: (Bosnia and Herzegovina) Marko Jošilo

Finals
- Champions: (Slovenia) Krka (1st title)
- Runners-up: (Slovenia) Sixt Primorska
- Semifinalists: (Serbia) Borac Čačak (Serbia) Vršac

Statistical leaders
Points	(Croatia) Martin Junaković	22.83
Rebounds	(United States) Jamir Hanner	10.88
Assists	(Serbia) Ilija Đoković	5.14
Index Rating	(Bosnia and Herzegovina) Marko Jošilo	23.16
- All statistics correct as of April 4, 2018.

The 2017–18 ABA League Second Division was the inaugural season of the ABA League Second Division with 12 men's teams from Serbia, Croatia, Slovenia, Montenegro, Bosnia and Herzegovina and Macedonia participating in it.

== Teams ==
=== Team allocation ===
On July 24, 2017, ABA League Assembly has decided to start the ABA League Second Division from the 2017–18 season, in which there will be 12 participants. Based on the results in the national championships and by taking into account which clubs have sent applications for participation in the ABA League Second Division, these teams will play in the ABA League Second Division.

League positions of the previous domestic league season after playoffs shown in parentheses.

Regular season
(Bosnia and Herzegovina) Bosna Royal (2nd)	(Montenegro) Teodo Tivat (4th)	(Slovenia) Rogaška (2nd)	(North Macedonia) AV Ohrid (6th)
(Bosnia and Herzegovina) Zrinjski (3rd)	(Serbia) Borac Čačak (6th)	(Slovenia) Krka (3rd)	
(Montenegro) Lovćen 1947 (3rd)	(Serbia) Dynamic VIP PAY (5th)	(Croatia) Split (4th)	
Second qualifying round
(Montenegro) Sutjeska (6th)	(Serbia) Vršac (7th)	(Slovenia) Sixt Primorska (7th)	
First qualifying round
(Bosnia and Herzegovina) Sloboda Tuzla (4th)	(Bosnia and Herzegovina) Široki (7th)	(Bosnia and Herzegovina) Mladost Mrkonjić Grad (11th)	

=== Venues and locations ===
Location of teams in the 2017–18 ABA League Second Division

Team	Home city	Arena	Capacity
AV Ohrid	Ohrid	Biljanini Izvori Sports Hall	4,000
Borac	Čačak	Borac Hall	4,000
Bosna Royal	Sarajevo	Mirza Delibašić Hall	5,616
Dynamic VIP PAY	Belgrade	Ranko Žeravica Sports Hall	5,000
Krka	Novo Mesto	Leon Štukelj Hall	2,500
Lovćen 1947	Cetinje	SC Lovćen	1,500
Rogaška	Rogaška Slatina	ŠD Rogaška Slatina	1,100
Sixt Primorska	Koper	Arena Bonifika	3,000
Split CO	Split	Arena Gripe	3,500
Teodo	Tivat	Dvorana Župa Tivat	1,500
Vršac	Vršac	Millennium Hall	4,400
Zrinjski	Mostar	Bijeli Brijeg Hall	1,000

=== Personnel and sponsorship ===
Team	Head coach	Captain	Kit manufacturer	Shirt sponsor
AV Ohrid	(North Macedonia) Petar Čočoroski	(North Macedonia) Slobodan Mihajlovski	Nike	—
Borac Čačak	(Serbia) Raško Bojić	(Serbia) Marko Marinović	—	P.S. Fashion, mts
Bosna Royal	(Croatia) Denis Bajramović	(Bosnia and Herzegovina) Edin Rešidović	GBT	Argeta
Dynamic VIP PAY	(Serbia) Miroslav Nikolić	(Serbia) Vuk Vulikić	NAAI	VIP PAY
Krka	(Slovenia) Simon Petrov	(Slovenia) Domen Bratož	Žolna šport	Krka
Lovćen 1947	(Montenegro) Petar Jovanović	(Montenegro) Nikola Borilović	Spalding	VOLI
Rogaška	(Slovenia) Damjan Novaković	(Slovenia) Dragiša Drobnjak	Nike	—
Sixt Primorska	(Slovenia) Jurica Golemac	(Slovenia) Nebojša Joksimović	Erreà	Sixt
Split	(Croatia) Ivica Skelin	(Croatia) Mateo Kedžo	GBT	Bobis
Teodo Tivat	(Montenegro) Rajko Krivokapić	(Montenegro) Igor Radonjić	—	—
Vršac	(Serbia) Goran Topić	(Montenegro) Miloš Savović	NAAI	Villager
Zrinjski	(Croatia) Hrvoje Vlašić	(Croatia) Vedran Princ	ArduSport	Prvo Plinarsko Društvo

=== Coaching changes ===
Team	Outgoing manager	Date of vacancy	Position in table	Replaced with	Date of appointment	Ref.
Dynamic VIP PAY	(Serbia) Oliver Popović	19 December 2017	5th (5–4)	(Serbia) Miroslav Nikolić	19 December 2017	
Bosna Royal	(Bosnia and Herzegovina) Aleksandar Damjanović	8 January 2018	11th (3–9)	(Serbia) Miloš Pejić	8 January 2018	
Vršac	(Serbia) Vladimir Đokić	20 January 2018	3rd (9–5)	(Serbia) Goran Topić	22 January 2018	
Teodo Tivat	(Montenegro) Zoran Glomazić	4 February 2018	9th (7–9)	(Montenegro) Rajko Krivokapić	4 February 2018	
Lovćen 1947	(Montenegro) Dragan Radović	15 February 2018	7th (8–9)	(Montenegro) Petar Jovanović	15 February 2018	
Bosna Royal	(Serbia) Miloš Pejić	20 March 2018	11th (6–14)	(Croatia) Denis Bajramović	20 March 2018	
Borac Čačak	(Serbia) Raško Bojić	9 April 2018	Post-season	(Serbia) Jovica Arsić	9 April 2018	

== Qualifying rounds ==
Venue: Laktaši Sports Hall, Laktaši, Bosnia and Herzegovina

=== Pre-qualifying tournament ===
Pos	Team	Pld	W	L	PF	PA	PD	Pts	Qualification
1	(Bosnia and Herzegovina) Široki	2	2	0	153	134	+19	4	Advance to the second qualifying round
2	(Bosnia and Herzegovina) Sloboda Tuzla	1	0	1	69	75	−6	1	
3	(Bosnia and Herzegovina) Mladost Mrkonjić Grad	1	0	1	65	78	−13	1	

Source: Pre-Qualifications Standings

15 September 2017
Široki (Bosnia and Herzegovina)	78–65	(Bosnia and Herzegovina) Mladost Mrkonjić Grad
16 September 2017
Sloboda Tuzla (Bosnia and Herzegovina)	69–75	(Bosnia and Herzegovina) Široki
17 September 2017
Mladost Mrkonjić Grad (Bosnia and Herzegovina)	N/P	(Bosnia and Herzegovina) Sloboda Tuzla

=== Qualifying tournament ===
Pos	Team	Pld	W	L	PF	PA	PD	Pts	Qualification
1	(Serbia) Vršac	3	3	0	271	236	+35	6	Advance to the regular season
2	(Slovenia) Sixt Primorska	3	2	1	273	256	+17	5	Advance to the regular season
3	(Montenegro) Sutjeska	3	1	2	219	239	−20	4	
4	(Bosnia and Herzegovina) Široki	3	0	3	213	245	−32	3	

Source: Qualifications Standings

27 September 2017
Vršac (Serbia)	109 – 106	(3OT)	(Slovenia) Sixt Primorska
Sutjeska (Montenegro)	79 – 76		(Bosnia and Herzegovina) Široki
28 September 2017
Sixt Primorska (Slovenia)	81 – 69		(Bosnia and Herzegovina) Široki
Vršac (Serbia)	77 – 62		(Montenegro) Sutjeska
29 September 2017
Sutjeska (Montenegro)	78–86		(Slovenia) Sixt Primorska
Široki (Bosnia and Herzegovina)	68–85		(Serbia) Vršac

== Regular season ==
=== League table ===
Pos	Team	Pld	W	L	PF	PA	PD	Pts	Qualification or relegation
1	(Serbia) Borac Čačak	22	16	6	1879	1711	+168	38	Advance to the Final Four
2	(Slovenia) Sixt Primorska	22	15	7	1739	1596	+143	37 (Note: Sixt Primorska 2–2, 1.02; Vršac 2–2, 0.99; Krka 2–2, 0.98)	Advance to the Final Four
3	(Serbia) Vršac	22	15	7	1846	1692	+154	37	Advance to the Final Four
4	(Slovenia) Krka	22	15	7	1784	1657	+127	37	Advance to the Final Four
5	(Slovenia) Rogaška	22	13	9	1776	1722	+54	35	
6	(Montenegro) Lovćen 1947	22	12	10	1782	1709	+73	34 (Note: Lovćen 1947 1–1, 1.02; Zrinjski 1–1, 0.97)	
7	(Bosnia and Herzegovina) Zrinjski	22	12	10	1694	1671	+23	34	
8	(Croatia) Split	22	10	12	1849	1831	+18	32	
9	(Montenegro) Teodo Tivat	22	9	13	1717	1749	−32	31	
10	(Serbia) Dynamic VIP PAY	22	8	14	1774	1842	−68	30	
11	(Bosnia and Herzegovina) Bosna Royal	22	6	16	1630	1715	−85	27 (Note: Bosna Royal sanctioned with one point less)	
12	(North Macedonia) AV Ohrid	22	1	21	1485	2040	−555	23	Lose the right to participate in the 2018–19 season

Source: ABA League Second Division

=== Positions by round ===
Team \ Round	1	2	3	4	5	6	7	8	9	10	11	12	13	14	15	16	17	18	19	20	21	22
(Serbia) Borac Čačak	1	3	2	6	3	6	4	4	4	4	4	2	1	2	2	2	1	1	1	1	1	1
(Slovenia) Sixt Primorska	4	2	3	2	2	1	1	1	1	2	1	1	2	1	1	1	4	2	2	2	4	2
(Serbia) Vršac	6	1	1	1	1	2	2	3	3	3	2	3	4	3	4	4	3	4	4	3	2	3
(Slovenia) Krka	3	10	6	4	5	4	3	2	2	1	3	4	3	4	3	3	2	3	3	4	3	4
(Slovenia) Rogaška	8	7	11	11	10	7	10	7	9	7	6	6	6	5	6	6	6	6	7	5	5	5
(Montenegro) Lovćen 1947	10	4	8	10	8	11	7	9	10	10	10	7	7	7	7	8	7	8	8	8	7	6
(Bosnia and Herzegovina) Zrinjski	11	9	10	5	9	5	8	10	8	6	5	5	5	6	5	5	5	5	5	6	6	7
(Croatia) Split	2	5	4	7	11	9	9	6	7	5	9	10	9	8	8	7	8	7	6	7	8	8
(Montenegro) Teodo Tivat	5	6	5	3	4	8	5	8	6	8	8	9	8	9	10	9	10	9	9	9	9	9
(Serbia) Dynamic VIP PAY	9	8	9	8	6	3	6	5	5	9	7	8	10	10	9	10	9	10	10	10	10	10
(Bosnia and Herzegovina) Bosna Royal	7	11	7	9	7	10	11	11	11	11	11	11	11	11	11	11	11	11	11	11	11	11
(North Macedonia) AV Ohrid	12	12	12	12	12	12	12	12	12	12	12	12	12	12	12	12	12	12	12	12	12	12

=== Results ===
Home \ Away	OHR	BOR	BOS	DYN	KRK	LOV	ROG	PRI	SPL	TEO	VRS	ZRI
AV Ohrid (North Macedonia)	—	62–82	20–0 (Note: Match not played.)	90–106	69–100	75–96	56–78	58–94	76–108	82–101	61–111	89–100
Borac Čačak (Serbia)	100–71	—	87–68	94–74	95–80	97–90	92–78	78–75	84–83	102–82	71–68	84–72
Bosna Royal (Bosnia and Herzegovina)	84–82	84–88	—	94–96	84–88	85–100	87–61	57–80	77–75	97–91	77–84	80–59
Dynamic VIP PAY (Serbia)	102–69	67–88	73–65	—	68–74	72–66	78–86	90–101	88–86	71–67	93–98	66–73
Krka (Slovenia)	102–52	84–79	71–65	75–76	—	89–76	81–73	93–81	87–85	70–59	83–76	75–65
Lovćen 1947 (Montenegro)	94–72	82–78	71–64	85–73	78–73	—	92–73	80–81	79–56	76–77	90–82	87–74
Rogaška (Slovenia)	102–76	88–78	80–64	82–77	83–84	81–70	—	80–69	81–75	81–76	95–72	86–76
Sixt Primorska (Slovenia)	92–54	79–73	72–59	86–78	72–69	77–70	90–93	—	86–98	82–71	77–55	67–64
Split (Croatia)	92–73	80–88	107–106	99–94	86–81	85–72	85–75	75–82	—	88–68	79–84	90–76
Teodo Tivat (Montenegro)	92–57	76–93	96–82	88–78	65–80	86–90	78–69	62–61	89–73	—	74–75	84–72
Vršac (Serbia)	111–79	88–72	78–81	87–79	88–67	86–74	85–76	74–68	100–69	91–67	—	80–72
Zrinjski (Bosnia and Herzegovina)	93–62	80–76	76–70	89–75	82–78	73–64	81–75	65–67	85–75	79–68	88–73	—

Source: ABA League Second Division
Legend: Blue = home team win; Red = away team win.
Matches with lighter background shading were decided after overtime.

== Final Four ==
Semifinals
3 April
(Serbia) Borac Čačak	82
(Slovenia) Krka	86
3 April
(Slovenia) Sixt Primorska	88
(Serbia) Vršac	64

Final
4 April
(Slovenia) Krka	87
(Slovenia) Sixt Primorska	73

Source: Adriatic League Second Division

== Statistical leaders ==
As of 28 March 2018 , after the end of the Regular Season.

=== PIR ===
Pos	Player	Club	PIR
1	(Bosnia and Herzegovina) Marko Jošilo	Krka	23.16
2	(Montenegro) Aleksa Popović	Lovćen 1947	20.83
3	(Bosnia and Herzegovina) Aleksandar Todorović	Dynamic VIP PAY	19.78
4	(Croatia) Mateo Kedžo	Split	18.89
5	(United States) Jamir Hanner	Bosna Royal	18.00

=== Points ===
Pos	Player	Club	PPG
1	(Croatia) Martin Junaković	AV Ohrid	22.83
2	(United States) Kenneth Craig Ross	AV Ohrid	17.90
3	(Montenegro) Aleksa Popović	Lovćen 1947	16.83
4	(United States) Rashun Davis	Rogaška	16.82
5	(Serbia) Aleksandar Todorović	Dynamic VIP PAY	15.89

=== Rebounds ===
Pos	Player	Club	RPG
1	(United States) Jamir Hanner	Bosna Royal	10.88
2	(Bosnia and Herzegovina) Marko Jošilo	Krka	9.74
3	(Saint Vincent and the Grenadines) Shawn King	Sixt Primorska	8.30
4	(Bosnia and Herzegovina) Emir Zimić	AV Ohrid	7.94
5	(Montenegro) Maksim Šturanović	Bosna Royal	7.57

=== Assists ===
Pos	Player	Club	APG
1	(Serbia) Ilija Đoković	Borac Čačak	5.14
2	(Serbia) Marko Marinović	Borac Čačak	5.00
3	(United States) Rashun Davis	Rogaška	4.95
4	(Montenegro) Nikola Korač	Lovćen 1947	4.93
5	(Croatia) Vedran Princ	Zrinjski	4.86

Source: ABA League Second Division

== MVP List ==
=== MVP of the Round ===
Round	Player	Team	PIR	Ref.
1	(Croatia) Mateo Kedžo	(Croatia) Split	51	
2	(Bosnia and Herzegovina) Draško Albijanić	(Montenegro) Lovćen 1947	38	
3	(Serbia) Nemanja Todorović	(Serbia) Borac Čačak	38	
4	(Bosnia and Herzegovina) Marko Jošilo	(Slovenia) Krka	37	
5	(Serbia) Miroslav Pašajlić	(Bosnia and Herzegovina) Bosna Royal	49	
6	(United States) Michaelyn Scott	(Croatia) Split	39	
7	(Bosnia and Herzegovina) Draško Albijanić (2)	(Montenegro) Lovćen 1947	36	
8	(Slovenia) Domen Bratož	(Slovenia) Krka	38	
9	(Croatia) Marko Ramljak	(Bosnia and Herzegovina) Zrinjski	31	
10	(Croatia) Marko Ramljak (2)	(Bosnia and Herzegovina) Zrinjski	26	
11	(Croatia) Marko Ramljak (3)	(Bosnia and Herzegovina) Zrinjski	32	
12	(United States) Jamir Hanner	(Bosnia and Herzegovina) Bosna Royal	35	
13	(Montenegro) Miloš Popović	(Montenegro) Teodo Tivat	38	
14	(Montenegro) Aleksa Popović	(Montenegro) Lovćen 1947	34	
15	(Serbia) Andreja Stevanović	(Serbia) Dynamic VIP PAY	34	
16	(United States) Michaelyn Scott (2)	(Croatia) Split	41	
17	(Serbia) Marko Marinović	(Serbia) Borac Čačak	33	
18	(Croatia) Marko Ramljak (4)	(Bosnia and Herzegovina) Zrinjski	31	
19	(Montenegro) Mašan Vrbica	(Montenegro) Lovćen 1947	37	
20	(Montenegro) Aleksa Popović (2)	(Montenegro) Lovćen 1947	34	
21	(Montenegro) Aleksa Popović (3)	(Montenegro) Lovćen 1947	30	
22	(Bosnia and Herzegovina) Draško Albijanić (3)	(Montenegro) Lovćen 1947	37	

== Attendances ==
Attendances include playoff games:

Pos	Team	Total	High	Low	Average	Change
1	(Serbia) Borac Čačak	20,750	2,500	1,150	1,729	n/a
2	(Serbia) Vršac	15,400	2,100	1,000	1,400	n/a
3	(Bosnia and Herzegovina) Zrinjski	11,000	1,550	600	1,000	n/a
4	(Montenegro) Lovćen 1947	9,550	1,500	250	868	n/a
5	(Slovenia) Sixt Primorska	10,050	1,150	300	838	n/a
6	(Slovenia) Krka	9,900	1,500	500	825	n/a
7	(Croatia) Split	8,450	1,100	250	768	n/a
8	(Bosnia and Herzegovina) Bosna Royal	8,370	1,000	620	761	n/a
9	(Slovenia) Rogaška	8,200	950	450	745	n/a
10	(North Macedonia) AV Ohrid	7,200	850	550	720	n/a
11	(Montenegro) Teodo Tivat	7,150	850	250	650	n/a
12	(Serbia) Dynamic VIP PAY	6,900	900	200	627	n/a
	League total	122,920	2,500	200	911	n/a

Updated to match(es) played on April 4, 2018. Source: ABA 2 League

== Second Division clubs in European competitions ==
Competition	Team	Progress	Result
Champions League	(Bosnia and Herzegovina) Bosna Royal	First qualifying round	Eliminated by (Germany) MHP Riesen Ludwigsburg, 118–187; transferred to FIBA Europe Cup
FIBA Europe Cup	(Bosnia and Herzegovina) Bosna Royal	Regular season Group A	4th (0–6)

== See also ==
- 2017–18 ABA League First Division
- 2017–18 WABA League

2017–18 domestic competitions

- 2017–18 Basketball League of Serbia
- (Croatia) 2017–18 A-1 League
- (Slovenia) 2017–18 Slovenian Basketball League
- (Montenegro) 2017–18 Prva A liga
- 2017–18 Basketball Championship of Bosnia and Herzegovina
- (North Macedonia) 2017–18 Macedonian First League
