= 2024–25 Basketball Championship of Bosnia and Herzegovina =

Prvenstvo BiH
- Season: 2024–25
- Games played: 194
- Teams: 15

Statistical leaders
Points	(Montenegro) Balsa Mirotić	20.8
Rebounds	(Bosnia and Herzegovina) Ismet Sejfić	13.5
Assists	(United States) Austin Luke	6.7
- All statistics correct as of 14 May 2025.

The 2024–25 Basketball Championship of Bosnia and Herzegovina (or "MaxBet Liga BIH" due to the sponsorship reasons) is 24th season of this championship, with 15 teams from Bosnia and Herzegovina participating in it.

KK Igokea is the defending champion.

== Competition format ==
Fourteen of fifteen teams joined the regular season, playing with as double round-robin tournament. The first five teams will join Liga 6 along with KK Igokea.

The change in format from this season is that the last three teams will be relegated at the end of regular season. Best placed team at the end of Liga 6 stage supposed to become champion and two best placed teams not participating in the first division of the ABA League will qualify for the second division of the ABA League. However, in the end of the Regular season, it was announced that Liga 4 will be played instead, with KK Igokea and regular season champions KK Bosna facing their opponents in the playoff semifinals.

== Teams and locations ==
=== Promotion and relegation ===
KK Spartak Prijedor was relegated, while KK Jahorina, KK Radnički Goražde and HKK Mostar were promoted from First League of Republika Srpska, A1 League and Herzeg-Bosnia League, respectively.

Locations of the 2024–25 Basketball Championship of Bosnia and Herzegovina teams

Team	City	Venue
Borac WWin	Banja Luka	Borik Sports Hall
Bosna Visit Sarajevo	Sarajevo	Mirza Delibašić Hall
Igokea m:tel	Laktaši	Laktaši Sports Hall
Jahorina	Pale	Peki Sports Hall
Leotar	Trebinje	Miloš Mrdić Sports Hall
Mladost	Mrkonjić Grad	Nova Banka Sports Hall
Mostar	Mostar	Bijeli Brijeg Sports Hall
Orlovik Nansi	Žepče	Catholic school center "Don Bosco"
Posušje	Posušje	Posušje City Sports Hall
Promo	Donji Vakuf	Peace and Friendship Sports Hall
Radnički	Goražde	Mirsad Hurić City Hall
Slavija 1996	Istočno Sarajevo	Istočno Sarajevo Sports Hall
Sloboda	Tuzla	Mejdan Sports Hall
Spars	Sarajevo	Goran Čengić Sports Hall
Široki TT Kabeli	Široki Brijeg	Pecara Sports Hall

Teams that play in the 2024–25 Adriatic League First Division
Teams that play in the 2024–25 Adriatic League Second Division

== Regular season ==
=== Standings ===
Pos	Team	Pld	W	L	GF	GA	GD	Pts	
1	Bosna Visit Sarajevo	26	23	3	2274	1853	+421	49	Advance to Playoffs semifinal
2	Široki TT Kabeli	26	21	5	2159	1812	+347	47	Advance to Liga 4
3	Sloboda	26	20	6	2196	2020	+176	46	Advance to Liga 4
4	Borac WWin	26	16	10	2074	1850	+224	42	Advance to Liga 4
5	Leotar	26	15	11	2151	2034	+117	41	Advance to Liga 4
6	Orlovik Nansi	26	14	12	2040	2037	+3	40	
7	Jahorina	26	14	12	1985	1950	+35	40	
8	Slavija 1996	26	14	12	2025	2072	−47	40	
9	Radnički	26	10	16	1953	2053	−100	36	
10	Promo	26	9	17	1995	2110	−115	35	
11	Mladost	26	9	17	2062	2138	−76	35	Relegated
12	Mostar	26	8	18	2046	2293	−247	34	Relegated
13	Spars	26	8	18	1952	2205	−253	34	Relegated
14	Posušje	26	1	25	1737	2222	−485	27	Relegated

Source: Basketball Federation of BiH

=== Results ===
Home \ Away	BOR	BOS	JAH	LEO	MLA	MOS	ORL	POS	PRO	RAD	SLA	SLO	SPA	SIR
Borac WWin	—	80–83	68–47	85–66	91–77	105–79	89–71	94–69	84–69	90–67	84–63	80–68	71–72	79–83
Bosna Visit Sarajevo	64–54	—	95–69	94–80	95–70	92–63	96–67	98–77	85–68	88–57	94–81	76–85	93–67	69–62
Jahorina	67–61	67–78	—	65–76	77–65	94–68	83–68	91–59	92–79	86–72	88–71	70–73	83–75	66–56
Leotar	81–64	58–87	66–85	—	86–79	101–80	85–69	83–67	101–84	91–81	87–76	104–87	100–74	86–93
Mladost	91–86	75–81	75–83	80–78	—	97–87	74–69	83–62	78–87	86–88	85–73	70–72	84–75	68–74
Mostar	84–85	57–109	85–75	92–100	86–70	—	76–77	81–69	90–69	58–98	90–103	84–87	83–84	69–89
Orlovik Nansi	77–96	90–80	91–71	78–74	91–79	94–83	—	87–70	83–79	81–72	92–68	91–79	81–72	67–90
Posušje	55–89	62–82	68–86	55–82	70–99	60–76	63–70	—	100–86	54–65	69–73	60–89	83–91	78–92
Promo	61–68	79–85	75–69	89–87	94–97	75–85	78–71	76–66	—	77–73	69–63	71–59	86–72	57–69
Radnički	61–68	65–97	88–74	71–55	86–77	87–91	78–73	81–69	89–87	—	74–80	91–95	51–64	59–79
Slavija 1996	71–67	74–94	88–84	71–61	78–76	92–80	79–73	99–50	74–71	81–74	—	66–86	76–75	77–84
Sloboda	72–68	92–71	85–64	71–99	90–85	100–66	83–79	106–71	91–80	85–76	95–87	—	94–72	74–68
Spars	71–100	69–102	75–85	72–87	88–81	87–92	72–87	72–65	94–69	76–81	76–88	96–93	—	56–95
Široki TT Kabeli	81–68	85–86	90–64	85–77	91–61	94–61	68–63	91–66	85–80	91–68	94–73	75–85	95–55	—

Source: Basketball Federation of BiH
Legend: Blue = home team win; Red = away team win.

== Liga 4 ==
=== Standings ===
Pos	Team	Pld	W	L	GF	GA	GD	Pts	
1	Borac WWin	6	6	0	482	423	+59	12	Advance to Playoffs semifinal and ABA 2
2	Široki TT Kabeli	6	4	2	466	451	+15	10	Advance to Playoffs semifinal and ABA 2
3	Leotar	6	2	4	463	465	−2	8	
4	Sloboda	6	0	6	405	477	−72	6	

Source: Basketball Federation of BiH

=== Results ===
Home \ Away	BOR	LEO	SLO	SIR
Borac WWin	—	85–67	69–68	79–72
Leotar	75–78	—	94–67	76–81
Sloboda	73–83	67–73	—	62–72
Široki TT Kabeli	68–88	87–78	86–68	—

Source: Basketball Federation of BiH
Legend: Blue = home team win; Red = away team win.

== Playoffs ==
The opponents were determined by the draw.

=== Bracket ===
Semi-finals
21–24 May
Bosna Visit Sarajevo	66	77
Široki TT Kabeli	66	67
21–24 May
Igokea m:tel	96	81
Borac WWin	75	78

Final
May
Bosna Visit Sarajevo	74	78
Igokea m:tel	77	85

=== Semi-finals ===
Team 1	Agg.	Team 2	1st leg	2nd leg
Bosna Visit Sarajevo	143–133	Široki TT Kabeli	66–66	77–67
Igokea m:tel	177–153	Borac WWin	96–75	81–78

=== Finals ===
Team 1	Agg.	Team 2	1st leg	2nd leg
Bosna Visit Sarajevo	152–162	Igokea m:tel	74-77	78-85

== Clubs in European competitions ==
Team	Competition	Progress
Igokea	Champions League	Regular season
