= Draško Albijanić =

Bosnian basketball player (born 1986)

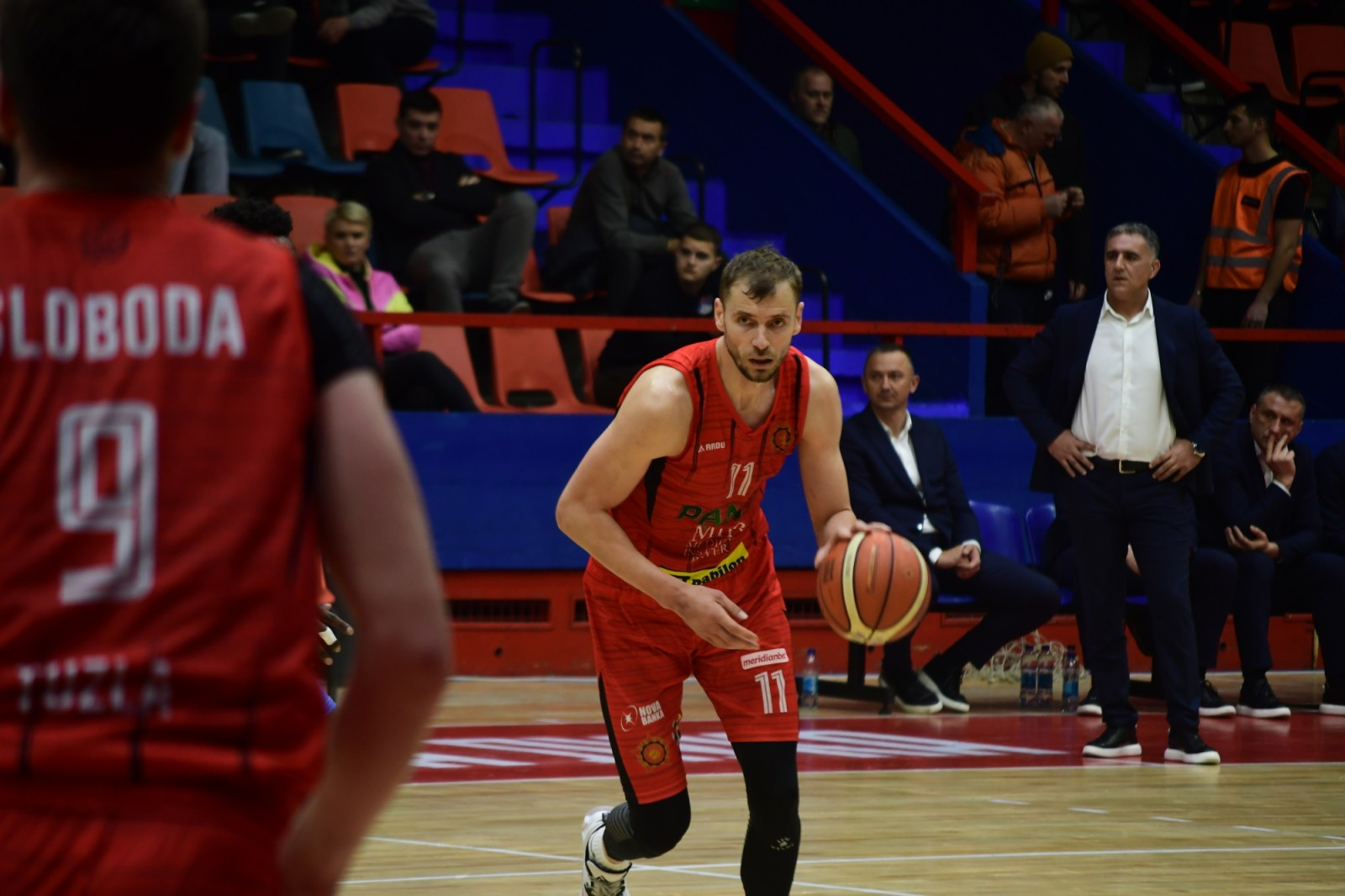
- Albijanić with Sloboda Tuzla in 2022

Free agent
- Position: Center

Personal information
- Born: December 14, 1986 (age 39) Trebinje, SR Bosnia-Herzegovina, SFR Yugoslavia
- Listed height: 2.08 m (6 ft 10 in)

Career information
- Playing career: 2003–present

Career history
- 2003–2007: Leotar Trebinje
- 2007–2011: Sloboda Tuzla
- 2011: Borac Nektar
- 2011–2012: CSU Asesoft Ploiești
- 2012–2013: CSU Pitești
- 2013: Energia Rovinari Targu
- 2013–2014: HKK Zrinjski Mostar
- 2014: Borac Čačak
- 2014–2015: Kožuv
- 2015–2016: Sutjeska
- 2016–2017: Igokea
- 2017–2018: Lovćen
- 2018–2021: Spars Sarajevo
- 2021-2022: Sloboda Tuzla
- 2022-2024: Leotar Trebinje

Career highlights
- 2× Bosnian League champion (2016, 2017); Bosnian Cup winner (2017)

Draško Albijanić (born December 14, 1986) is a Bosnian professional basketball player who last played for Leotar Trebinje of the Bosnian League.
