= 2011–12 KK Mladost Mrkonjić Grad season =

KK Mladost Mrkonjić Grad
2011–12 season
- President: (Bosnia and Herzegovina) Goran Milanović
- Head coach: (Bosnia and Herzegovina) Goran Sladojević
- National Championship of Bosnia and Herzegovina: Semi-finals
- Kup BIH: Semifinal
- Scoring leader: Ninoslav Milošević (13.3 ppg)
- Highest home attendance: 1,000
- Lowest home attendance: 200

In the 2011–12 season, KK Mladost will compete in the National Championship of Bosnia and Herzegovina.

== In ==
- (Montenegro) Petar Jovanović (from Leotar)
- (Bosnia and Herzegovina) Miloš Trikić (from Borac Banja Luka)
- (Serbia) Goran Ignjatović (from (Serbia) Crnokosa)
- (Bosnia and Herzegovina) Samir Lerić (from Čapljina Lasta)
- (Serbia) Nenad Đorić (from Servitium)
- (Montenegro) Igor Bijelić (from Servitium)
- (Bosnia and Herzegovina) Almir Hasandić (from Zrinjski)

== Out ==
- (Montenegro) Miloš Komatina (to Igokea)
- (Serbia) Milijan Bocka (to Igokea)
- (Bosnia and Herzegovina) Armin Avdibegović (to Zrinjski)
- (Serbia) Bogdan Jovanović (to Zrinjski)
- (Serbia) Goran Ignjatović (to — )
- (Montenegro) Petar Jovanović (to — )
- (Bosnia and Herzegovina) Miloš Trikić (to — )
