= 2018–19 Basketball Championship of Bosnia and Herzegovina =

Prvenstvo BiH
- Season: 2018–19
- Duration: 21 October 2018 – May 2018
- Teams: 11

Regular season
- Relegated: Gradina; Student Mostar; Bosna Royal

Finals
- Champions: Široki (10th title)
- Runners-up: Spars Ziraat Bank
- Semifinalists: Zrinjski; Sloboda

Statistical leaders
Points	Milivoje Božović	18.5
Rebounds	Milivoje Božović	11.3
Assists	Koča Jovović	6.3

Records
- Biggest home win: Spars Ziraat Bank 107–47 Gradina (21 October 2018)
- Biggest away win: Bosna Royal 52–131 Spars Ziraat Bank (16 March 2019)

The 2018–19 Basketball Championship of Bosnia and Herzegovina was the 18th season of this championship, with 11 teams from Bosnia and Herzegovina participating in it. Zrinjski was the defending champion. Široki won its tenth league title.

== Competition format ==
Eleven teams would join the regular season, played with as double round-robin tournament. Igokea, participant in the 2018–19 Adriatic League First Division, would not join the competition.

== Teams and locations ==
Locations of the 2018–19 Basketball Championship of Bosnia and Herzegovina teams

Team	City	Venue
Bosna Royal	Sarajevo	Mirza Delibašić Hall
Bratunac	Bratunac	SD Bratunac
Gradina	Srebrenik	JU SRC Srebrenik
Kakanj	Kakanj	JU KSC Kakanj
Mladost	Mrkonjić Grad	Arena Komercijalne Banke
Spars Ziraat Bank	Sarajevo	SD Novo Sarajevo
Sloboda	Tuzla	SKPC Mejdan
Student Mostar	Mostar	SD Bijeli Brijeg
Široki	Široki Brijeg	GSD Pecara
Vogošća	Vogošća	SD Amel Bečković
Zrinjski	Mostar	SD Bijeli Brijeg

Teams that play in the 2018–19 Adriatic League Second Division

== Regular season ==
=== Standings ===
Pos	Team	Pld	W	L	GF	GA	GD	Pts	Qualification
1	Široki	20	17	3	1744	1465	+279	37	Qualification to the group for the title
2	Spars Ziraat Bank	20	16	4	1657	1305	+352	36	Qualification to the group for the title
3	Zrinjski	20	16	4	1717	1577	+140	36	Qualification to the group for the title
4	Sloboda	20	13	7	1668	1555	+113	33	Qualification to the group for the title
5	Mladost	20	11	9	1615	1579	+36	31	Qualification to the group for the title
6	Vogošća	20	10	10	1593	1553	+40	30	Qualification to the group for the title
7	Kakanj	20	9	11	1496	1542	−46	29	Qualification to relegation group
8	Bratunac	20	7	13	1612	1664	−52	27	Qualification to relegation group
9	Student Mostar	20	6	14	1587	1733	−146	26	Qualification to relegation group
10	Gradina (Note: Gradina retired after the end of the regular season.)	20	4	16	1401	1713	−312	24	Retired
11	Bosna Royal	20	1	19	1507	1911	−404	21	Qualification to relegation group

Source: Basketball Federation of BiH

=== Results ===
Home \ Away	SIR	SPA	ZRI	SLO	MLA	VOG	KAK	BRA	STU	GRA	BOS
Široki	—	66–75	95–79	92–70	93–74	70–54	72–60	86–80	102–68	85–77	105–73
Spars Ziraat Bank	63–74	—	67–63	68–62	94–60	74–63	76–60	84–75	98–62	107–47	100–68
Zrinjski	95–87	60–63	—	84–82	88–77	92–77	100–71	82–73	88–85	86–65	101–83
Sloboda	78–79	85–84	79–81	—	75–73	90–76	85–70	110–83	97–70	82–72	83–73
Mladost	65–83	78–72	92–77	90–86	—	82–79	78–63	84–75	93–64	87–69	101–82
Vogošća	73–76	73–79	73–85	83–78	70–63	—	85–75	85–70	87–78	92–64	108–75
Kakanj	92–81	83–78	69–86	73–80	82–78	67–79	—	81–71	65–60	96–67	82–67
Bratunac	63–84	77–81	79–83	73–81	82–74	79–84	86–82	—	102–93	82–66	93–80
Student Mostar	85–95	52–87	90–92	72–85	89–84	100–83	75–64	95–86	—	80–83	97–100
Gradina	63–119	51–76	75–91	70–77	76–81	83–77	70–86	86–95	68–78	—	78–65
Bosna Royal	78–100	52–131	95–104	89–103	80–101	73–95	66–75	63–88	74–92	71–74	—

Legend: Blue = home team win; Red = away team win.

== Group for the title ==
=== League table ===
Pos	Team	Pld	W	L	GF	GA	GD	Pts	Qualification
1	Široki	30	25	5	2551	2198	+353	55	Advance to playoffs
2	Spars Ziraat Bank	30	23	7	2452	2026	+426	53	Advance to playoffs
3	Zrinjski	30	23	7	2554	2302	+252	53	Advance to playoffs
4	Sloboda	30	17	13	2428	2411	+17	47	Advance to playoffs
5	Vogošća	30	14	16	2332	2365	−33	44	
6	Mladost	30	11	19	2369	2424	−55	41	

Source: Basketball Federation of BiH

=== Results ===
Home \ Away	SIR	SPA	ZRI	SLO	VOG	MLA
Široki	—	59–72	72–101	101–80	91–76	79–71
Spars Ziraat Bank	69–83	—	91–76	59–72	90–56	80–66
Zrinjski	77–63	72–79	—	89–65	98–69	88–79
Sloboda	76–82	105–104	72–101	—	56–80	80–75
Vogošća	56–72	68–77	80–77	74–80	—	97–89
Mladost	81–86	68–90	71–85	72–77	82–83	—

Source: Basketball Federation of BiH
Legend: Blue = home team win; Red = away team win.

== Relegation group ==
=== Standings ===
Pos	Team	Pld	W	L	GF	GA	GD	Pts	Relegation
1	Bratunac	26	12	14	2127	2124	+3	38	
2	Kakanj	26	12	14	2010	2044	−34	38	
3	Student Mostar	26	10	16	2113	2207	−94	36	Relegated
4	Bosna Royal	26	1	25	1973	2494	−521	27	Relegated

Source: Basketball Federation of BiH

=== Results ===
Home \ Away	BRA	KAK	STU	BOS
Bratunac	—	103–92	71–79	91–75
Kakanj	67–74	—	86–82	92–70
Student Mostar	69–75	92–80	—	105–82
Bosna Royal	78–101	81–97	80–99	—

Source: Basketball Federation of BiH
Legend: Blue = home team win; Red = away team win.

== Playoffs ==
Semifinals will be played in a best-of-three games format, while the final in a best-of-five (2-2-1) format.

=== Bracket ===
Semi-finals
Široki	2
Sloboda	1
Spars Ziraat Bank	2
Zrinjski	1

Final
Široki	3
Spars Ziraat Bank	2

Source: Basketball Federation of BiH

=== Semi-finals ===
Team 1	Series	Team 2	Game 1	Game 2	Game 3
Široki	2–1	Sloboda	104–90	72–82	76–72
Spars Ziraat Bank	2–1	Zrinjski	88–81	65–70	79–71

=== Finals ===
Team 1	Series	Team 2	Game 1	Game 2	Game 3	Game 4	Game 5
Široki	3–2	Spars Ziraat Bank	77–66	63–70	80–84	75–59	82–69
