= 2015–16 BIBL season =

2015–16 BIBL
- Season: 2015–16
- Teams: 9

Finals
- Champions: (Kosovo) Sigal Prishtina
- Runners-up: (Montenegro) Mornar

In the eighth season of the Balkan International Basketball League, nine participants from Bulgaria, Kosovo, the Republic of Macedonia and Montenegro has competed.

== Teams ==
Country	Teams	Teams		
Kosovo	3	Bashkimi Prizren	Peja	Sigal Prishtina
Montenegro	3	Lovćen	Mornar	Teodo
Bulgaria	2	Beroe	Levski Sofia	
(North Macedonia) Macedonia	1	Kožuv		

== Format ==
In the first round the teams were divided into two groups, each containing respectively four and five teams. Each team played every other team in its group at home and away. The top three teams from each group advanced to the second round. The teams that finished fourth and fifth in their group play additionally in a qualification group to determine two additional participants to the second round.

The eight remaining teams are again separated into two groups with four teams each. The teams that already have played during the first round kept the results between them from the first stage and played with the two remaining teams from the other group home and away games. The winners of both groups, as well the runners-up advanced to the semifinals. In them they play in home and away elimination games. The winners of those advanced to the final, decided on home and away games.

== First round ==
The games will be played between 13 October 2015 and 20 January 2016.

=== Group A ===
	Team	Pld	W	L	PF	PA	Diff	Pts
1.	(Montenegro) Mornar	6	5	1	498	449	+49	11
2.	(Kosovo) Sigal Prishtina	6	4	2	457	404	+53	10
3.	(North Macedonia) Kožuv	6	2	4	441	479	−38	8
4.	(Bulgaria) Beroe	6	1	5	439	503	−64	7

	BER	KOZ	MOR	PRI
(Bulgaria) Beroe		78–73	93–95	73–80
(North Macedonia) Kožuv	90–81		63–79	68–62
(Montenegro) Mornar	86–58	91–87		75–86
(Kosovo) Sigal Prishtina	79–56	88–60	62–72	

=== Group B ===
	Team	Pld	W	L	PF	PA	Diff	Pts
1.	(Kosovo) Peja	8	7	1	659	582	+77	15
2.	(Montenegro) Teodo	8	5	3	622	570	+52	13
3.	(Kosovo) Bashkimi Prizren	8	5	3	615	576	+39	13
4.	(Bulgaria) Levski Sofia	8	2	6	581	611	−30	10
5.	(Montenegro) Lovćen	8	1	7	511	649	−138	9

	BAS	LEV	LOV	PEJ	TEO
(Kosovo) Bashkimi Prizren		94–75	95–61	82–73	79–78
(Bulgaria) Levski Sofia	77–60		99–72	66–90	65–71
(Montenegro) Lovćen	66–75	68–61		65–82	55–78
(Kosovo) Peja	83–70	75–68	78–61		83–79
(Montenegro) Teodo	63–60	81–70	81–63	91–95	

== Second round ==
The games of the qualification round are between 26 and 28 January 2016. The games of the second round will be played between 2 February and 16 March 2016.

=== Qualification ===
	Team	Pld	W	L	PF	PA	Diff	Pts
1.	(Bulgaria) Beroe	2	2	0	168	139	+29	4
2.	(Bulgaria) Levski Sofia	2	1	1	161	157	+4	3
3.	(Montenegro) Lovćen	2	0	2	146	179	−33	2

26 January 2016
16:30

Report

Beroe (Bulgaria)	80–70	(Bulgaria) Levski Sofia
Scoring by quarter: 25−12, 21−18, 22−23
Pts: Vaklinov 26; Rebs: Vaklinov 10; Asts: Karamfilov 5		Pts: Slaveykov 27; Rebs: Simeonov 11; Asts: Hadzhirusev, Petkov 3

Arena Samokov, Samokov
Attendance: 200
Referees: Haris Bijedić, Ivan Miličević, Dragan Kralj

27 January 2016
18:00

Report

Levski Sofia (Bulgaria)	91–77	(Montenegro) Lovćen
Scoring by quarter: 15−21, 20−23, 32−10, 24−23
Pts: Simeonov 35; Rebs: Simeonov 10; Asts: Minchev 4		Pts: Milić 16; Rebs: Petrić 10; Asts: Jovanović 6

Arena Samokov, Samokov
Attendance: 150
Referees: Ivan Miličević, Aleksandar Milojevik, Ernad Karović

28 January 2016
18:00

Report

Lovćen (Montenegro)	69–88	(Bulgaria) Beroe
Scoring by quarter: 17−24, 17−27, 15−20, 20−17
Pts: Jovanović, Milić 15; Rebs: Knežević 7 Asts: Jovanović 4		Pts: Moore 14; Rebs: Gary 9 Asts: Karamfilov 4

Arena Samokov, Samokov
Attendance: 150
Referees: Haris Bijedić, Aleksandar Milojevik, Ernad Karović

=== Group C ===
	Team	Pld	W	L	PF	PA	Diff	Pts
1.	(Montenegro) Mornar	6	4	2	461	408	+53	10
2.	(Bulgaria) Beroe	6	4	2	477	451	+26	10
3.	(Montenegro) Teodo	6	3	3	406	441	−35	9
4.	(Kosovo) Bashkimi Prizren	6	1	5	437	481	−44	7

	BAS	BER	MOR	TEO
(Kosovo) Bashkimi Prizren		70–88	74–80	68–69
(Bulgaria) Beroe	90–80		68–87	85–62
(Montenegro) Mornar	78–63	76–80		93–67
(Montenegro) Teodo	76–82	76–66	56–47	

=== Group D ===
	Team	Pld	W	L	PF	PA	Diff	Pts
1.	(Kosovo) Sigal Prishtina	6	6	0	512	428	+84	12
2.	(North Macedonia) Kožuv	6	3	3	460	450	+10	9
3.	(Kosovo) Peja	6	2	4	470	479	−9	8
4.	(Bulgaria) Levski Sofia	6	1	5	458	543	−85	7

	KOZ	LEV	PEJ	PRI
(North Macedonia) Kožuv		99–72	72–67	75–87
(Bulgaria) Levski Sofia	73–82		87–91	75–103
(Kosovo) Peja	77–76	79–85		72–74
(Kosovo) Sigal Prishtina	74–56	89–66	85–84	

== Semifinal ==
22 March 2016
19:00

Report

Kožuv (North Macedonia)	86–71	(Montenegro) Mornar
Scoring by quarter: 23−18, 23−22, 16−23, 24−8
Pts: Brčkov 21; Rebs: Brčkov 7 Asts: Gjuroski 5		Pts: Jones 30; Rebs: three players 5 Asts: Čalić 4

Sportska sala 26 April, Gevgelija
Referees: Marius Ciulin, Georgios Poursanidis, Gentian Cici

29 March 2016
18:30

Report

Mornar (Montenegro)	81–56	(North Macedonia) Kožuv
Scoring by quarter: 24−18, 23−13, 19−19, 15−6
Pts: Jones 22; Rebs: Sampson, Radunović 11; Asts: Mijović 5		Pts: Penn 18; Rebs: Nešović 6 Asts: Nešović 4

Sportska dvorana Topolica, Bar
Referees: Ademir Zurapović, Ventsislav Velikov, Haris Bijedić

23 March 2016
18:00

Report

Beroe (Bulgaria)	75–89	(Kosovo) Sigal Prishtina
Scoring by quarter: 23−25, 18−20, 19−24, 15−20
Pts: Moore 16; Rebs: Vaklinov 9 Asts: Zhelev 5		Pts: Abukar 26; Rebs: Abukar, Washburn 13; Asts: three players 5

Obshtinska zala, Stara Zagora
Referees: Ademir Zurapović, Zoran Mitrovski, Haris Bijedić

30 March 2016
19:30

Report

Sigal Prishtina (Kosovo)	94–75	(Bulgaria) Beroe
Scoring by quarter: 26−14, 22−15, 20−20, 26−26
Pts: Berisha 28; Rebs: Washburn 12; Asts: Berisha 6		Pts: Vaklinov 16; Rebs: Todorović 7 Asts: Gray, Moore 5

Pallati i Rinisë dhe Sporteve, Pristina
Referees: Zoran Šutulović, Ognjen Jokić, Radomir Vojinović

== Final ==
12 April 2016
19:30

Report

Sigal Prishtina (Kosovo)	82–68	(Montenegro) Mornar
Scoring by quarter: 23−25, 22−11, 23−12, 14−20
Pts: Berisha 20; Rebs: Washburn 10; Asts: Kemp 7		Pts: Jones 22; Rebs: Sampson 10; Asts: Jones 7

Pallati i Rinisë dhe Sporteve, Pristina
Attendance: 2,000
Referees: Ademir Zurapović, Haris Bijedić, Martin Horozov

20 April 2016
20:00

Report

Mornar (Montenegro)	75–68	(Kosovo) Sigal Prishtina
Scoring by quarter: 23−15, 12−24, 22−8, 18−21
Pts: Jones 22; Rebs: Sampson 10; Asts: three players 3		Pts: Washburn 24; Rebs: Washburn 11; Asts: Kemp 7
Sigal Prishtina won 150−143 on aggregate

Sportska dvorana Topolica, Bar
Attendance: 2,300
Referees: Marius Ciulin, Georgios Poursanidis, Ventsislav Velikov

2015–16 Balkan League Champions

Sigal Prishtina
2nd Title
