= 2012–13 KK Mladost Mrkonjić Grad season =

KK Mladost Mrkonjić Grad
2012–13 season
- President: Goran Milanović
- Head coach: Goran Sladojević
- Basketball Championship of Bosnia and Herzegovina: In progress
- BiH Cup: 1/8
- Cup RS: Runner-up
- Scoring leader: Igor Bijelić (18.4 ppg)

In the 2012–13 season, Mladost Mrkonjić Grad will compete in the Basketball Championship of Bosnia and Herzegovina, BiH Cup, and RS Cup.

== Current roster ==
Number	Player	Position	Height (m)	Year of birth
4	(Bosnia and Herzegovina) Đorđe Aleksić	PG	1.84	1997
5	(Bosnia and Herzegovina) Ognjen Milekić	PG	1.81	1991
6	(Bosnia and Herzegovina) Stojan Radanović	SG	1.97	1994
7	(Bosnia and Herzegovina) Draško Knežević	SG	1.93	1993
8	(Montenegro) Ninoslav Milošević	SG	1.96	1979
9	(Bosnia and Herzegovina) Obrad Tomić	C	2.07	1993
10	(Montenegro) Igor Bijelić	C	2.08	1988
11	(Bosnia and Herzegovina) Miloš Vidović	C	2.03	1993
12	(Bosnia and Herzegovina) Milan Kežić	SF	1.96	1986
13	(Serbia) Petar Ivanić	PG	1.93	1981
14	(Serbia) Ranko Velimirović (C)	PF	2.04	1972
15	(Bosnia and Herzegovina) Maksim Radanović	PF	2.03	1990
--	(Serbia) Damjan Stojkanović	PF	2.03	1991
--	(Serbia) Marko Kesić	PG	1.91	1985

=== Depth chart ===
Pos.	Starting 5	Bench 1	Bench 2
C	Igor Bijelić	Obrad Tomić
PF	Ranko Velimirović	Maksim Radanović
SF	Milan Kežić	Miloš Vidović
SG	Draško Knežević	Ninoslav Milošević	Stojan Radanović
PG	Petar Ivanić	Ognjen Milekić	Đorđe Aleksić

== Roster changes ==
=== In ===
No.	Pos.	Nat.	Name	Age	Moving from
10	C	(Montenegro)	Igor Bijelić	24	(Bosnia and Herzegovina) Servitium
7	SG	(Bosnia and Herzegovina)	Draško Knežević	19	(Bosnia and Herzegovina) Borac Banja Luka
9	C	(Bosnia and Herzegovina)	Obrad Tomić	19	(Bosnia and Herzegovina) Zrinjski HT
5	PG	(Bosnia and Herzegovina)	Ognjen Milekić	21	(Bosnia and Herzegovina) Borac Banja Luka
TBA	PF	(Serbia)	Damjan Stojkanović	22	(Bosnia and Herzegovina) Servitium
TBA	PG	(Serbia)	Marko Kesić	28	(Serbia) Vojvodina

=== Out ===
No.	Pos.	Nat.	Name	Age	Moving to
9	C	(Bosnia and Herzegovina)	Samir Lerić	38	(Bosnia and Herzegovina) Bosna
11	SG	(Bosnia and Herzegovina)	Almir Hasandić	21	(Bosnia and Herzegovina) Bosna
7	C	(Bosnia and Herzegovina)	Dragan Đuranović	23	(Bosnia and Herzegovina) Borac Banja Luka
10	PF	(Bosnia and Herzegovina)	Miloš Trikić	21	(Bosnia and Herzegovina) Borac Banja Luka
5	PG	(Serbia)	Nenad Đorić	34	Free agent

=== Statistics ===
Legend
GP	Games played	GS	Games started	MPG	Minutes per game
FG%	Field-goal percentage	3FG%	3-point field-goal percentage	FT%	Free-throw percentage
RPG	Rebounds per game	APG	Assists per game	SPG	Steals per game
BPG	Blocks per game	PPG	Points per game	PIR	PIR per game

==== Liga 12 ====
#	Player	GP	MPG	FG%	3FG%	FT%	RPG	APG	SPG	BPG	PPG	EFF
4	(Bosnia and Herzegovina) Đorđe Aleksić	3	2.30	.0	.0	.0	1.5	1.5	0.0	0.0	0.0	1.0
5	(Bosnia and Herzegovina) Ognjen Milekić	12	14.39	42.9	33.3	72.7	1.6	0.6	0.5	0.0	4.2	1.7
6	(Bosnia and Herzegovina) Stojan Radanović	3	1.50	100.0	.0	.0	0.0	0.0	0.0	0.0	2.0	0.7
7	(Bosnia and Herzegovina) Draško Knežević	10	23.35	68.2	26.1	82.1	2.9	3.4	1.5	0.0	11.0	13.1
8	(Montenegro) Ninoslav Milošević	12	28.41	58.6	35.1	87.5	3.8	1.7	1.3	0.1	7.3	11.3
9	(Bosnia and Herzegovina) Obrad Tomić	12	7.14	68.4	.0	14.3	1.2	0.1	0.0	0.0	2.3	1.1
10	(Montenegro) Igor Bijelić	12	31.48	70.6	.0	78.7	7.0	1.6	0.9	1.5	18.3	23.0
11	(Bosnia and Herzegovina) Miloš Vidović	6	4.40	25.0	.0	75.0	0.8	0.2	0.0	0.0	1.0	0.5
12	(Bosnia and Herzegovina) Milan Kežić	12	30.25	60.5	63.6	69.2	4.6	2.3	1.0	0.3	11.7	14.0
13	(Serbia) Petar Ivanić	12	28.55	70.2	30.8	65.2	2.1	4.9	0.9	0.1	12.2	14.1
14	(Serbia) Ranko Velimirović	12	28.25	44.8	30.3	78.6	3.9	2.5	0.9	0.5	11.0	9.4
15	(Bosnia and Herzegovina) Maksim Radanović	10	7.35	83.3	33.3	.0	1.5	0.2	0.2	0.2	2.2	1.7

== Competitions ==
=== Basketball League of Serbia ===
==== Standings ====
	Team	Pld	W	L	PF	PA	Diff	Points
1	Čapljina Lasta	11	9	2	827	746	+81	20
2	Mladost	11	8	3	842	762	+80	19
3	Bosna	11	8	3	938	868	+70	19
4	Radnik BN Basket	11	7	4	808	776	+32	18

Qualified for Liga 8
Relegated

Pld - Played; W - Won; L - Lost; PF - Points for; PA - Points against; Diff - Difference; Pts - Points.

As of 20 December 2012

==== Matches ====
20 October 2012
17:00

Report

Zrinjski HT	63–58	Mladost
Scoring by quarter: 19–16, 12–12, 16–20, 16–10
Pts: Sinadinović 21; Rebs: Jazvin 11; Asts: Sinadinović 3		Pts: Bijelić 16; Rebs: Bijelić 11; Asts: Ivanić 3

Pod Bijelim Brijegom
Mostar, Bosnia
Attendance: 500
Referees: Dragan Kralj, Božidar Radanović, Filip Lovrić

27 October 2012
19:00

Report

Mladost	68–66	Borac Banja Luka
Scoring by quarter: 17–23, 22–14, 12–15, 17–14
Pts: Bijelić 21; Rebs: Velimirović 6 Asts: Milošević 5		Pts: Pavlović 19; Rebs: Pavlović 9 Asts: Lončar 5

Arena Komercijalne Banke MG
Mrkonjić Grad, Bosnia
Attendance: 1000
Referees: Milan Adamović, Saša Babić, Miljan Šobot

3 November 2012
19:00

Report

SL Takovo Leotar	82–84 (OT)	Mladost
Scoring by quarter: 10–21, 21–18, 19–12, 20–19, Overtime: 12–14
Pts: Šakotić 19; Rebs: Knežević 9 Asts: Kašćelan 4		Pts: Bijelić 20; Rebs: Kežić 8 Asts: Ivanić 4

SD "Miloš Mrdić"
Trebinje, Bosnia
Attendance: 600
Referees: Ivan Miličević, Filip Lovrić, Goran Prskalo

10 November 2012
19:00

Report

Mladost	88–66	Vogošća
Scoring by quarter: 20–17, 22–14, 23–10, 23–25
Pts: Kežić 21; Rebs: Knežević 8 Asts: Knežević 7		Pts: Hot 13; Rebs: Hot 5 Asts: Hot 5

Arena Komercijalne banke MG
Mrkonjić Grad, Bosnia
Attendance: 1200
Referees: Saša Babić, Aco Okuka, Mirza Palo
