= Miodrag Kadija =

Montenegrin basketball coach

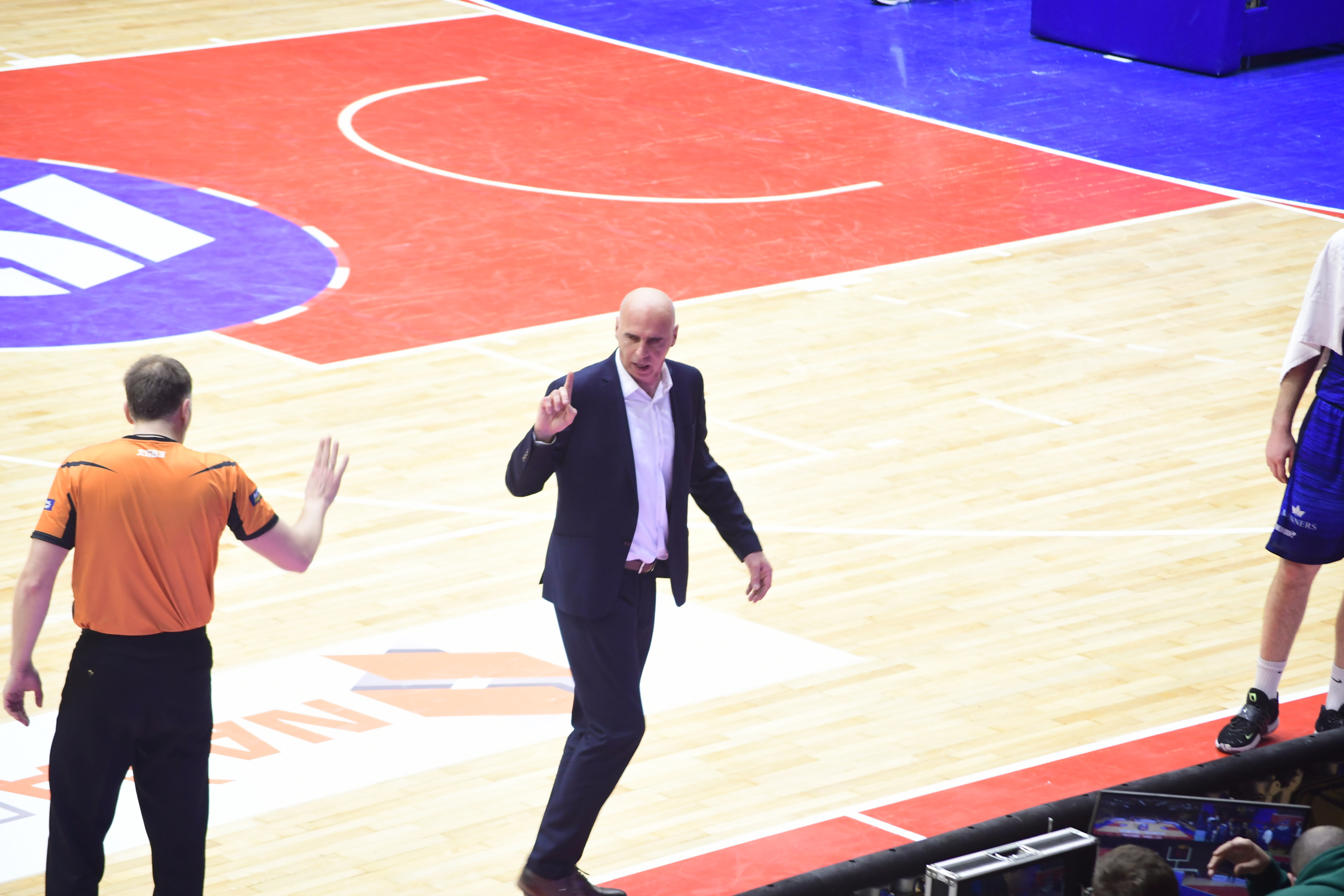

Spars Ilidža
- Position: Head coach
- League: Bosnian Championship; ABA League Second Division

Personal information
- Born: 27 September 1962 (age 64) Cetinje, PR Montenegro, FPR Yugoslavia
- Coaching career: 1991–present

Career history

Coaching
- 1992–2001: Lovćen
- 2001–2002: Budućnost
- 2003–2004: Atlas
- 2004–2005: Lovćen Cetinje
- 2005: Avala Ada
- 2005–2006: Sloga
- 2007: Igokea
- 2007: Strumica
- 2013: Feni Industries
- 2013–2017: Teodo Tivat
- 2018–2019: Lovćen 1947
- 2021, 2022–present: Spars
Medals
Men's basketball
Head coach for Serbia and Montenegro
Under-16 European Championship
Gold medal – first place	2003 Spain	Team

Miodrag "Mijo" Kadija (born 27 September 1962) is a Montenegrin basketball coach of Spars Ilidža of the Basketball Championship of Bosnia and Herzegovina and the ABA League Second Division.

== Coaching career ==
Kadija coached Lovćen Cetinje, Budućnost, Atlas, Avala Ada, Sloga, Igokea, Strumica, Feni Industries, Teodo Tivat.

On 23 August 2018, Kadija became a head coach for the Montenegrin team Lovćen 1947 for the third time. He left after the 2018–19 season ended.

On 2 January 2021, Bosnian team Spars hired Kadija as their new head coach. He left Spars after the 2020–21 season ended. On 31 December 2021, he re-signed with Spars.

== National teams coaching career ==
Kadija was the head coach of the Serbia & Montenegro U16 national team that won the gold medal at the 2003 European Championship for Cadets in Madrid, Spain. He also coached National under-18 team at the 2004 FIBA Europe Under-18 Championship in Spain.

Kadija was the head coach of the Montenegro U18 national team.
