= 2023–24 Basketball Championship of Bosnia and Herzegovina =

Prvenstvo BiH
- Season: 2022–23
- Teams: 12

Finals
- Champions: Igokea m:tel
- Runners-up: Borac WWin
- Semifinalists: Bosna Meridianbet; Široki TT Kabeli

The 2023–24 Basketball Championship of Bosnia and Herzegovina is 23rd season of this championship, with 13 teams from Bosnia and Herzegovina participating in it.

KK Igokea is the defending champion.

== Competition format ==
Twelve of thirteen teams joined the regular season, playing with as double round-robin tournament. The first five teams will join Liga 6 along with KK Igokea.

The last six teams will join Relegation league. The last team will be relegated at the end of relegation group phase.

== Teams and locations ==
=== Promotion and relegation ===
HKK Zrinjski Mostar was relegated. After a historic season, KK Budućnost Bijeljina withdrew from the competition to develop youth categories affiliated with KK Bosna Meridianbet.

Spartak Prijedor and Orlovik were promoted from First League of Republika Srpska and A1 League, respectively.

Locations of the 2023–24 season teams

Team	City	Venue
Borac WWIN	Banja Luka	Borik Sports Hall
Bosna Meridianbet	Sarajevo	Mirza Delibašić Hall
Igokea m:tel	Laktaši	Laktaši Sports Hall
Leotar	Trebinje	Miloš Mrdić Sports Hall
Mladost	Mrkonjić Grad	Komercijalna banka Arena
Orlovik	Žepče	
Posušje	Posušje	GSD Posušje
Promo	Donji Vakuf	Donji Vakuf Sports Hall
Slavija 1996	Istočno Sarajevo	
Sloboda	Tuzla	SKPC Mejdan
Spars	Ilidža	Novo Sarajevo Sports Hall
Spartak	Prijedor	
Široki TT Kabeli	Široki Brijeg	Pecara Sports Hall

Teams that play in the 2023–24 Adriatic League First Division
Teams that play in the 2023–24 ABA League Second Division

== Regular season ==
=== Standings ===
Pos	Team	Pld	W	L	GF	GA	GD	Pts	
1	Široki TT Kabeli	22	20	2	1846	1498	+348	42	Qualification for the Liga 6 and 2024-2025 ABA 2 League
2	Bosna Meridianbet	22	17	5	1935	1665	+270	39	Qualification for the Liga 6
3	Sloboda Tuzla	22	14	8	1808	1680	+128	36	Qualification for the Liga 6
4	Borac WWIN	22	13	9	1614	1505	+109	35	Qualification for the Liga 6
5	Mladost Mrkonjić Grad	22	12	10	1772	1741	+31	34	Qualification for the Liga 6
6	Spars	22	12	10	1919	1934	−15	34	
7	Orlovik	22	10	12	1797	1853	−56	32	Qualification for the Relegation group
8	Leotar	22	9	13	1765	1848	−83	31	Qualification for the Relegation group
9	Promo	22	8	14	1683	1798	−115	30	Qualification for the Relegation group
10	Slavija 1996	22	6	16	1682	1880	−198	28	Qualification for the Relegation group
11	Posušje	22	6	16	1594	1863	−269	28	Qualification for the Relegation group
12	Spartak Prijedor	22	5	17	1727	1877	−150	27	Qualification for the Relegation group

Source: Basketball Federation of BiH

== Liga 6 ==
=== League table ===
Pos	Team	Pld	W	L	GF	GA	GD	Pts	Qualification
1	Igokea m:tel	10	8	2	800	703	+97	18	Advance to playoffs
2	Borac Banja Luka	10	8	2	765	715	+50	18	Advance to playoffs
3	Bosna Meridianbet	10	5	5	803	783	+20	15	Advance to playoffs
4	Široki TT Kabeli	10	5	5	753	736	+17	15	Advance to playoffs
5	Sloboda Tuzla	10	4	6	780	808	−28	14	
6	Mladost Mrkonjić Grad	10	0	10	710	866	−156	10	

Source: Basketball Federation of BiH

== Relegation group ==
=== Standings ===
Pos	Team	Pld	W	L	GF	GA	GD	Pts	Relegation
1	Orlovik	32	16	16	2684	2694	−10	48	
2	Leotar	32	16	16	2689	2750	−61	48	
3	Promo	32	11	21	2480	2622	−142	43	
4	Slavija 1996	32	11	21	2471	2744	−273	43	
5	Posušje	32	10	22	2443	2690	−247	42	
6	Spartak Prijedor	32	10	22	2601	2739	−138	42	Relegated

Source: Basketball Federation of BiH

== Playoffs ==
Semifinals will be played in a best-of-three games format, while the final in a best-of-five (2-2-1) format.

=== Bracket ===
Semi-finals
Igokea m:tel	2
Široki TT Kabeli	0
Borac WWIN	2
Bosna Meridianbet	1

Final
Igokea m:tel	2
Borac WWIN	0

=== Semi-finals ===
Team 1	Series	Team 2	Game 1	Game 2	Game 3
Igokea m:tel	2–0	Široki TT Kabeli	96-82	77–70	x
Borac WWIN	2–1	Bosna Meridianbet	60-57	60–74	87–80

=== Finals ===
Team 1	Series	Team 2	Game 1	Game 2	Game 3
Igokea m:tel	2–0	Borac WWIN	57–56	76–62	x

== Clubs in European competitions ==
Team	Competition	Progress
Igokea	Champions League	Regular season
