= Marko Trbić =

Bosnian basketball coach (born 1974)

Spars Realway
- Positions: Youth coach Sports director

Personal information
- Born: August 16, 1974 (age 52) Zenica, SR Bosnia and Herzegovina, Yugoslavia
- Coaching career: 2000–present

Career history

Coaching
- 2000–2010: Čelik
- 2010–2019: Spars Sarajevo

Marko Trbić (born August 16, 1974) is a Bosnian professional basketball coach. He currently serves as a coach for OKK Sloboda Tuzla of the Basketball Championship of Bosnia and Herzegovina.

== Coaching career ==
In October 2010, Trbić became a head coach for Spars Sarajevo. In April 2018, he was named a sports director for Spars. In August 2019, he became the head of the youth selection and coach for the U18 and U20 teams.
