= Emir Likić =

Bosnian basketball player

No. 13 – Bosna
- Position: Forward
- League: Bosnian League; ABA League

Personal information
- Born: 1 December 2004 (age 21) Sarajevo, Bosnia and Herzegovina
- Listed height: 203 cm (6 ft 8 in)

Career information
- Playing career: 2022–present

Career history
- 2022–2024: Visoko
- 2024–2025: Studenti
- 2025–present: Bosna BH Telecom

Emir Likić (born 1 December 2004) is a Bosnian professional basketball player who plays as a forward for KK Bosna BH Telecom in the Bosnian League, ABA League and FIBA Europe Cup. He began his senior career with lower‑division clubs before joining Bosna and making his debut in European competition.

== Professional career ==
Likić made his senior club debut with KK Visoko in the 2022–23 season. He then played for KK Studenti, Bosna's farm team, during the 2024–25 campaign, where he recorded notable performances including near triple‑double games with strong all‑around statistics.

In the 2025–26 season, Likić joined KK Bosna BH Telecom, one of Bosnia's most historic basketball clubs competing in domestic, regional and continental competition. He made his FIBA Europe Cup debut for Bosna in November 2025, recording points and rebounds.
