= KK Bratunac =

Basketball club in Bratunac, Bosnia and Herzegovina

Bratunac
- Leagues: Bosnia and Herzegovina Championship
- Founded: 1974; 51 years ago
- History: KK Bratunac; 1974–present
- Arena: Bratunac Sports Hall
- Capacity: 1,200
- Location: Bratunac, Bosnia and Herzegovina
- Team colors: Purple and orange
- Head coach: Ognjen Radić

Košarkaški klub Bratunac (Serbian Cyrillic: Кошаркашки клуб Братунац, transl. Bratunac Basketball Club), commonly referred to as KK Bratunac, is a men's professional basketball club based in Bratunac, Republika Srpska, Bosnia and Herzegovina. They are currently competing in the Bosnia and Herzegovina Championship.

== History ==
The club was founded in 1974.

The club won the First League of Republika Srpska in the 2017–18 season and got promoted to Bosnia and Herzegovina Championship for the 2018–19 season.

== Sponsorship naming ==
The club has had several denominations through the years due to its sponsorship:

- Vihor Bratunac (2008–2007)
- Bratunac MINS (2007–2009)
- Bratunac TRB (2019–2020)

== Home arena ==
Bratunac plays its home games at the Bratunac Sports Hall. The hall is located in Bratunac and has a seating capacity of 1,200 seats.

== Head coaches ==
- (Bosnia and Herzegovina) Milivoje Mađenović (2017–2018)
- (Bosnia and Herzegovina) Ognjen Radić (2018–present)

== Trophies and awards ==
- First League of Republika Srpska (2nd-tier)
  - Winners (1): 2017–18
