= Ismet Sejfić =

Bosnian basketball player (born 1993)

Sloboda Tuzla
- Position: Center

Personal information
- Born: September 7, 1993 (age 32) Prozor, Bosnia and Herzegovina
- Listed height: 6 ft 10 in (2.08 m)
- Listed weight: 275 lb (125 kg)

Career information
- NBA draft: 2015: undrafted
- Playing career: 2012–present

Career history
- 2012–2013: İzmir Büyükşehir Belediyesi GSK
- 2014–2015: BC Dzūkija
- 2015–2016: KK Student Mostar
- 2016–2017: PVSK Panthers
- 2017: Bosna
- 2017–2018: Jászberényi KSE
- 2017–2018: GGD Šenčur
- 2019–2021: Sutjeska
- 2021–2022: Podgorica
- 2022–2023: Golden Eagle Ylli
- 2023: Bosna
- 2023–present: Sloboda Tuzla

Ismet Sejfić (born September 7, 1993) is a Bosnian professional basketball player of Sloboda Tuzla. Also, he represents Bosnia and Herzegovina national basketball team.

== Playing career ==
In the 2016–17 season, he played for PVSK Panthers and averaged 16.9 points and 8.0 rebounds. He spent the 2015-16 season with KK Student Mostar in the Basketball Championship of Bosnia and Herzegovina after spending the previous season with BC Dzūkija in the Lithuanian Basketball League. In August 2021, he signed for Podgorica.
