= Terrel Castle =

American basketball player (born 1972)

Personal information
- Born: September 12, 1972 (age 54) Jeanerette, Louisiana, U.S.
- Listed height: 5 ft 11.75 in (1.82 m)
- Listed weight: 185 lb (84 kg)

Career information
- High school: Jeanerette (Jeanerette, Louisiana)
- College: Southwestern CC (1991–1993); Nicholls State (1993–1995)
- NBA draft: 1995: undrafted
- Playing career: 1997–2013
- Position: Point guard

Career history
- 1997–1998: Kočani Delikates
- 1998–2001: Sloboda Tuzla
- 2001: Maccabi Raanana
- 2001–2002: JL Bourg-en-Bresse
- 2002–2003: Strasbourg IG
- 2003–2004: EWE Oldenburg
- 2004–2008: Aris Thessaloniki
- 2008: Unicaja Málaga
- 2008–2009: Olympia Larissa
- 2009: Igokea
- 2009–2010: Iraklis Thessaloniki
- 2010–2011: AEK Athens
- 2011–2012: Stockholm Eagles
- 2012–2013: Eco Örebro

Career highlights
- Greek Cup winner (2005); Greek League All-Star (2006); German Bundesliga All-Star (2004); Bosnian League All-Star (1999); 2× Bosnian League Foreign Player of the Year (2000, 2001); Bosnian Cup winner (1999); 2× Bosnian Super Cup winner (1999, 2000)

Terrel Ray Castle (born September 12, 1972) is an American-Bosnian former professional basketball player. He played college basketball at Nicholls State University, where he averaged 18.3 points per game with the Nicholls Colonels, during the 1995–96 season.

== College career ==
Castle played college basketball at Southwestern Community College and at Nicholls State University.

== Professional career ==
Castle played for Sloboda Tuzla from 1998 to 2001. He played for Maccabi Raanana in 2001 and then moved to JL Bourg-en-Bresse where he played during the 2001–02 season.

He played for Strasbourg IG in 2002 and then moved to EWE Baskets Oldenburg where he played from 2002 to 2004. He signed with Aris Thessaloniki in 2004, and played there until 2008. With Aris, he played in the Greek Cup final against Panathinaikos Athens in 2005, and also in the ULEB Cup final against Dynamo Moscow, in 2006.

In 2008, he left Aris and joined Málaga, and later that same year he joined Olympia Larissas. In 2009, he joined Iraklis Thessaloniki of the Greek 2nd-tier level Greek A2 Basket League.

== National team career ==
Castle played for the senior men's Bosnia and Herzegovina national team at the 2003 FIBA EuroBasket.

== EuroLeague career highs ==
- Points: 22 – Aris Thessaloniki vs. Benetton Treviso: 1/18/2007
- Rebounds: 8 – Aris Thessaloniki vs. Benetton Treviso: 1/18/2007
- Assists: 5 – Aris Thessaloniki vs. Le Mans: 12/20/2007
- Steals: 6 – Napoli vs. Aris Thessaloniki: 11/8/2006
- Blocks: 1 – Aris Thessaloniki vs. Barcelona: 1/31/2007
- PIR: 25 – Aris Thessaloniki vs. Pau Orthez: 11/15/2006
