= Dženan Rahimić =

Bosnian basketball player and coach

Personal information
- Born: November 23, 1974 (age 51) Mostar, SR Bosnia and Herzegovina, SFR Yugoslavia
- Listed height: 205 cm (6 ft 9 in)

Career information
- Playing career: 1993–2010
- Position: Center
- Coaching career: 2010–present

Career history

Playing
- 1993–1994: Zrinjski Mostar
- 1994–1996: Šibenik
- 1997–1998: Zrinjevac Zagreb
- 2000–2001: Braunschweig
- 2001: Bnei Hertzliya
- 2001–2002: Viola Reggio Calabria
- 2002–2003: Bourg Basket
- 2003–2004: Olimpija Ljubljana
- 2004–2005: Spirou Charleroi
- 2005–2006: Tuborg Izmir
- 2006–2007: Bosna
- 2007–2008: KK Zagreb

Coaching
- 2010–2013: Student Mostar
- 2013–2015: Jolly Šibenik
- 2020–2021: Šibenka
- 2022–2024: Bosna
- 2024–2025: Zrinjski Mostar
- 2025–2026: Donji Vakuf

Dženan Rahimić (born November 23, 1974) is a Bosnian-Croatian basketball coach, and former professional player, who was most recently head coach of Donji Vakuf in the Basketball Championship of Bosnia and Herzegovina. As a player, he was a center in several European leagues during his career, and following his retirement he became a coach in Bosnian and Croatian club basketball.

== Playing career ==
Rahimić began his professional career with his hometown club Zrinjski Mostar in the early 1990s before moving to Croatia, where he played for Šibenik and Zrinjevac Zagreb. He went on to play for clubs across Europe including Braunschweig in Germany, Bnei Hertzliya in Israel, Viola Reggio Calabria in Italy, JL Bourg Basket in France, Olimpija Ljubljana in Slovenia, Pau-Orthez in France, Spirou Charleroi in Belgium, and Tuborg Izmir in Turkey. In the latter stages of his career he played for Bosna in his native Bosnia and Herzegovina and finally Zagreb.

== Coaching career ==
Following his retirement from playing, Rahimić began coaching in Bosnia and Croatia. He worked with Student Mostar and later was head coach of Jolly Šibenik in Croatia. In 2022 he was appointed head coach of KK Bosna Royal, a major Bosnian basketball club. In 2024, Rahimić returned to his hometown to become head coach of HKK Zrinjski Mostar. He parted ways with Zrinjski in November 2025. In January 2026 he was named coach of Donji Vakuf.
