= Denis Bajramović =

Croatian basketball player and coach

Donji Vakuf
- Position: Head coach
- League: BCBH

Personal information
- Born: 6 October 1961 (age 65) Dubrovnik, PR Croatia, FPR Yugoslavia

Career history

Playing
- Dubrovnik

Coaching
- Dubrovnik
- Konavle Cavtat
- 2005: Union Olimpija (interim)
- 2006–2007: Šibenka
- 2008–2012: Zagreb
- 2017–2018: Golden Eagle Ylli
- 2018–2019: Bosna
- 2025–present: Donji Vakuf

Denis Bajramović (born 6 October 1961), is a Croatian professional basketball coach and former player. He currently serves as the head coach for Donji Vakuf in the Basketball Championship of Bosnia and Herzegovina (BCBH).

== Coaching career ==
Bajramović coached Dubrovnik, Konavle Cavtat, Šibenik, Zagreb, Slovenian team Union Olimpija.

On September 13, 2017, Bajramović became a head coach for Golden Eagle Ylli of the Kosovo Superleague.

On March 20, 2018, Bajramović was appointed head coach of KK Bosna.

=== National team ===
Bajramović was an assistant coach of Aleksandar Petrović with the Bosnia and Herzegovina national team at the EuroBasket 2013.
