= Draško Knežević =

Bosnian basketball player

Kumanovo
- Position: Point guard
- League: Macedonian League

Personal information
- Born: February 3, 1993 (age 33) Banja Luka, Bosnia and Herzegovina
- Listed height: 1.88 m (6 ft 2 in)

Career information
- Playing career: 2012–present

Career history
- 2012–2013: Mladost Mrkonjić Grad
- 2013–2015: Igokea
- 2015–2016: Mladost Mrkonjić Grad
- 2016–2017: Zrinjski Mostar
- 2017–2018: Bosna Royal
- 2018–2020: Sutjeska
- 2020–2022: Borac Banja Luka
- 2022–2024: BK Patrioti Levice
- 2024–2025: MBK Handlová
- 2025: Mladost Mrkonjić Grad
- 2025–present: Kumanovo

Draško Knežević (Serbian Cyrillic: Драшко Кнежевић; born 3 February 1993) is a Bosnian professional basketball player for Kumanovo of the Macedonian League.

He was MVP of the 2016–17 Basketball Championship of Bosnia and Herzegovina.
