= Bosnian Basketball All-Star Game =

- Status: Inactive
- Frequency: Periodically
- Inaugurated: 1997-98
- Most recent: 2009-10
- Organizer: Basketball Federation of Bosnia and Herzegovina

The Bosnian Basketball All-Star Game was an annual basketball event in Bosnia and Herzegovina, organised by the Basketball Federation of Bosnia and Herzegovina. It was established in 1998 as the All-Star Game of the Bosnian League. The event was held periodically and consisted of an all-star game, a three-point shoot contest and slam-dunk exhibition.

Many ledendary Bosnian players like Mirza Teletović, Haris Mujezinović, Jasmin Hukić, and Terrel Castle have played in the All-Star Game.

== List of games ==
Bold: Team that won the game.

Year	Date/Location	Team	Score	Team	MVP
1998		Blue		White	
1999		Blue	115-**140**	**White**	
2004	March 21, Zenica	South	won	**North**	(Bosnia and Herzegovina) Martin Vanjak

== Score sheets (1998-2004) ==
- All-Star Game 1997-98:

DATE:
VENUE:
SCORE: Blue - White

Blue: Muamer Taletovic, Goran Terzic, Armin Isakovic, Zarko Vujovic, Elmedin Konakovic, Jasmin Hukić, Abdurahman Kahrimanovic, Fedja Jovanovic, Mensur Bejramovic, Munib Dzuho, Adnan Hodzic, Admir Bukva

White: Senad Delic, Vedran Bosnic, Kenan Asceric, Azur Korlatovic, Suad Muzur, Tarik Valjevac, Maric Mensur, Haris Mujezinović, Damir Karahodza, Ivan Opacak, Ramiz Suljanovic

For the White also played in the second half: Jasmin Hukić, Abdurahman Kahrimanovic, Goran Terzic, Zarko Vujovic, Muamer Taletovic, Munib Dzuho, Fedja Jovanovic, Mensur Bejramovic, Adnan Hodzic, Admir Bukva, Elmedin Konakovic, Armin Isakovic

- All-Star Game 1998-99:

DATE:
VENUE:
SCORE: Blue - White

All-Stars: Biberovic 3, Senad Delic 7, Ivan Opacak 15, Cengic 2, Valentin Vidovic 11, Jasmin Hukić 12, Mirkovic 19, Zarko Vujovic 8, Lepic 0, Kalpic 28, Admir Bukva 4, Bajrovic 6 . Coach: Sabit Hadžić

All-Stars: Teletovic 18, Milan Marinković 11, Terrel Castle 9, Leric 15, Ramiz Suljanovic 20, Tarik Valjevac 19, Husanovic 2, Fedja Jovanovic 0, Becic 13, Bajrovic 8, Muris Andelija 9, Halimic 16. Coach: Drazen Pesic

- All-Star Game 2003-04:

DATE: 21 March
VENUE: Zenica
SCORE: North - South

North All-Stars: Martin Vanjak 31,

South All-Stars: Nedzad Mulic, Ivan Opacak 20, Kenan Bajramovic

== All Star Game events ==
=== Three-Point Shoot Contest ===
Year	Player	Team
2004	(Bosnia and Herzegovina) Nenad Markovic	(Greece) Panionios B.C.

=== Slam-Dunk champions ===
Year	Player	Team
2004	(Bosnia and Herzegovina) Selmir Husanovic	OKK Sloboda Tuzla

== Topscorers ==
Year	Player	Points	Team
1998	(Bosnia and Herzegovina) Kalpic	28	
2004	(Bosnia and Herzegovina) Martin Vanjak	31	HKK Siroki

== Notable participants ==
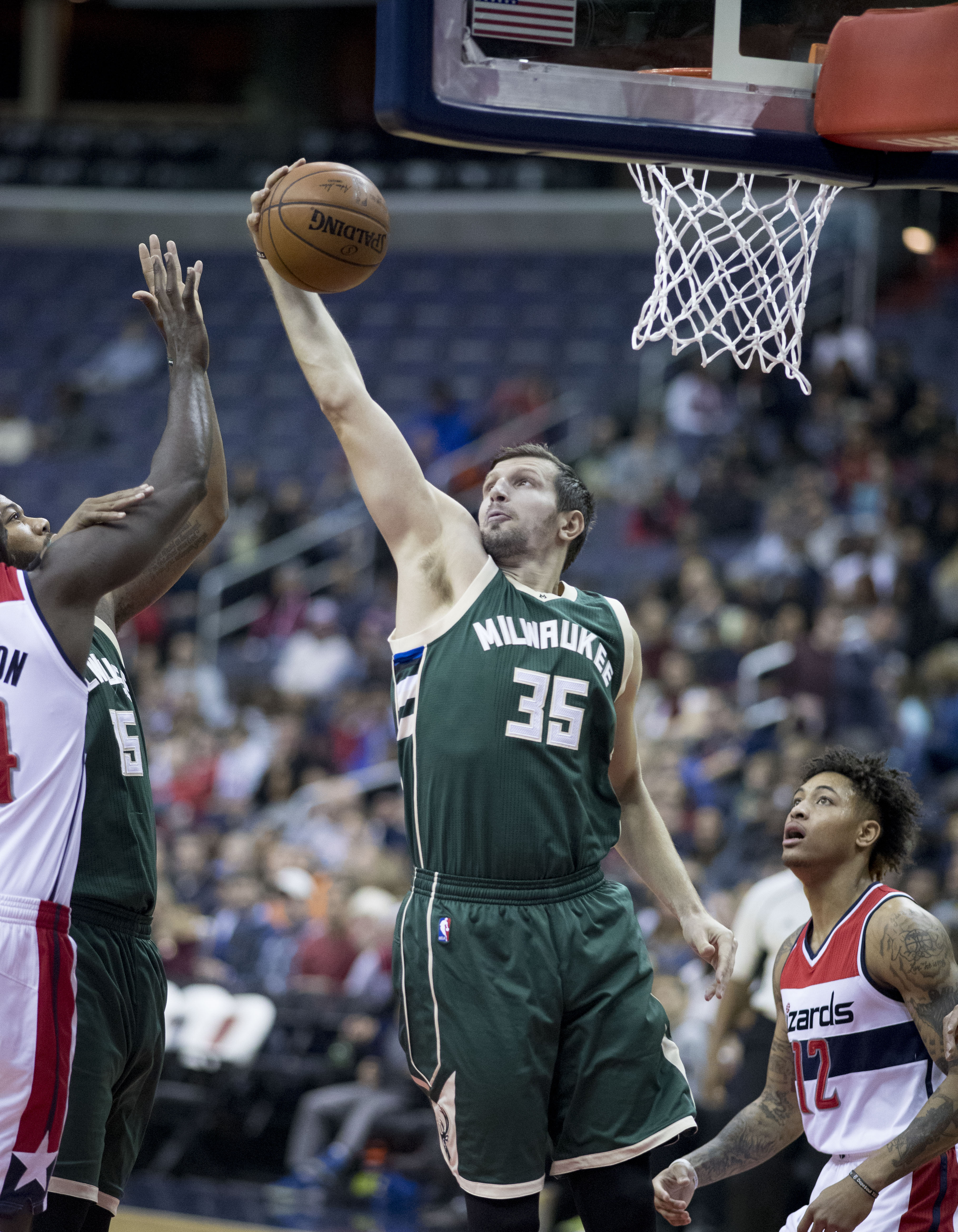
Former NBA player Mirza Teletović participated in the 2004 edition.

- (Bosnia and Herzegovina) Ivan Opačak (1999, 2004)
- (Bosnia and Herzegovina) Jasmin Hukić (1998, 1999)
- (Bosnia and Herzegovina) Haris Mujezinović (1998)
- (Bosnia and Herzegovina) Jasmin Perković (1999)
- (United States) (Bosnia and Herzegovina) Terrel Castle 1999
- (Bosnia and Herzegovina) Mirza Teletović (2004)
- (Bosnia and Herzegovina) Kenan Bajramović (2004)
- (Serbia) Marko Djurković (2010)
- (Bosnia and Herzegovina) Milan Marinković (1999)

== See also ==
- Adriatic Basketball Association All-Star Game
