= Obrad Tomić =

Academic Plovdiv
- Position: Center
- League: NBL

Personal information
- Born: April 8, 1993 (age 33) Trebinje, Bosnia and Herzegovina
- Listed height: 2.08 m (6 ft 10 in)
- Listed weight: 108 kg (238 lb)

Career information
- NBA draft: 2015: undrafted
- Playing career: 2011–present

Career history
- 2011–2012: Zrinjski
- 2012–2015: Mladost Mrkonjić Grad
- 2015–2017: Kakanj
- 2017–2018: Partizan
- 2018–2019: Rogaška
- 2019: Sloboda Tuzla
- 2019–2021: Academic Plovdiv
- 2021–2022: EuroNickel 2005
- 2022–2024: Rapla KK
- 2024-present: Academic Plovdiv

Obrad Tomić (Serbian Cyrillic: Обрад Томић, born April 8, 1993) is a Bosnian professional basketball player for Rapla KK. He also represents the Bosnia and Herzegovina national basketball team internationally.

== Professional career ==
Obrad Tomić started his career with Zrinjski in the Basketball Championship of Bosnia and Herzegovina. He also played for the Mladost Mrkonjić Grad and Kakanj, also in the Bosnian League.

On July 12, 2017, Tomić signed a three-year contract with Partizan Belgrade. He left Partizan in July 2018.

On August 13, 2017, Tomić signed a contract with Rogaška. Rogaška part ways with him on February 7, 2019.

== National team career ==
Tomić represents the Bosnia and Herzegovina national basketball team at the 2019 FIBA Basketball World Cup qualification. On 19 August 2017, Tomić led his team to an 83–66 win in Yerevan over Armenia in with 16 points and 4 rebounds and also led the team to the Second round of qualification for FIBA World Cup 2019.
