= Miloš Komatina =

Montenegrin professional basketball player

Personal information
- Born: 15 September 1984 (age 42) Sarajevo, SFR Yugoslavia
- Listed height: 2.06 m (6 ft 9 in)

Career information
- NBA draft: 2006: undrafted
- Playing career: 2003–present
- Position: Power forward

Career history
- 2003–2008: Primorje Herceg Novi
- 2008: Mogren Budva
- 2009: Zdravlje
- 2009: Primorje Herceg Novi
- 2009–2010: Igokea
- 2010–2011: Mladost Mrkonjić Grad
- 2011–2013: Igokea
- 2013–2014: Budućnost
- 2014: Tamiš
- 2014–2015: Cherno More
- 2015–2016: Igokea
- 2016–2022: BC Timișoara

Career highlights
- 2× Bosnian League champion (2013, 2016); Montenegrin League champion (2014); 2× Bosnian Cup winner (2013, 2016); Montenegrin Cup winner (2014)

Milos Komatina (born 15 September 1984) is former a Montenegrin professional basketball player. He is a power forward, and can also play center.

Komatina began playing in the 2003–04 season with the Primorje Herceg Novi team. He stayed with them through 2008 before signing with KK Mogren Buvda. His achievements include winning the 2012-13 Bosnian National Championship with BC Igokea Aleksandrovac, winning the 2013 Bosnian Cup with BC Igokea Aleksandrovac, and winning the 2013-14 Montenegrin National Championship with BC Buducnost Podgorica.
