= Rajko Krivokapić =

Montenegrin basketball coach

Personal information
- Born: March 20, 1986 (age 40) Kotor, SR Montenegro, SFR Yugoslavia
- Position: Head Coach
- Coaching career: 2013–present

Career history

Coaching
- 2013–2014: ŽKK Primorje Herceg Novi (assistant)
- 2014–2018: Teodo Tivat (assistant)
- 2018–2019: Teodo Tivat

Rajko Krivokapić (born March 20, 1986) is a Montenegrin basketball coach. He currently serves as a head coach for the Teodo Tivat of the Montenegrin Basketball League and the Adriatic Second League.

== Coaching career ==
On February 4, 2018, Krivokapić became a head coach for the Montenegrin team Teodo Tivat.
