= 2024–25 ABA League Second Division =

ABA League Second Division
- Season: 2024–25
- Duration: October 2024 – May 2025
- Teams: 16
- TV partner: Arena Sport

Regular season
- Promoted: Bosna Visit Sarajevo; Ilirija

Finals
- Champions: Bosna Visit Sarajevo
- Runners-up: Ilirija
- Semi-finalists: Vojvodina mts Zlatibor Mozzart
- Finals MVP: (United States) Jarrod West
- All statistics correct as of June 8, 2024.

The 2024–25 ABA League Second Division was the seventh season of the ABA Second Division with teams from Bosnia and Herzegovina, Croatia, Montenegro, North Macedonia, Serbia, and Slovenia participating in it.

== Format changes ==
Following the expansion in the first division of ABA League, from this season 16 clubs contested the second division as well (12 based on the results in the domestic championships and remaining 4 via wild card invitation).

From this season, instead of the five ("bubble") tournaments, 16 teams have been be divided into the four Regular Season groups, each consisting of four clubs.

In each group, the teams played against each other in a home-and-away round-robin system. Two best-placed teams of each group advanced to the Top 8 phase of the competition. Top 8 teams were then divided into two groups, each consisting of four teams with home-and-away round-robin system as well. The two best-placed teams of each Top 8 group advanced into the Playoffs. The Semi-finals and Finals were played in a best-of-three series format (1–1–1).

== Distribution ==
The following is the access list for this season.

Access list for the 2024–25 ABA League Second Division
| | Clubs entering in this round | Clubs advancing from the previous round |
|---|---|---|
| Regular season (16 clubs) | 2 highest-placed clubs from each of the six national leagues (12 in total); 4 clubs with wild cards.; No team was relegated from 2023-24 ABA League first division. | |
| Top 8 (8 clubs) | | |

== Club allocation ==
Location of teams in the 2024–25 season

The labels in the parentheses show how each team qualified for the place of its starting round:

- 1st–9th: Positions in national leagues at the end of Regular Season (or Playoffs).
- RW: Domestic league Regular Season winner.
- WC: Wild card.

Regular season
| (Basketball Federation of Bosnia and Herzegovina) Borac WWIN (2nd) | (Croatian Basketball Federation) Šibenka (9th)^{WC} | (Basketball Federation of North Macedonia) MZT Skopje Aerodrom (1st) | (Basketball Federation of Serbia) Zlatibor Mozzart (3rd) |
| (Basketball Federation of Bosnia and Herzegovina) Bosna Visit Sarajevo (3rd)^{WC} | (Basketball Federation of Montenegro) Podgorica (1st) | (Basketball Federation of North Macedonia) Pelister (2nd) | (Basketball Federation of Serbia) Joker (6th)^{WC} |
| (Basketball Federation of Bosnia and Herzegovina) Široki TT Kabeli (4th)^{RW} | (Basketball Federation of Montenegro) Sutjeska (2nd) | (Basketball Federation of North Macedonia) Rabotnički (3rd)^{WC} | (Basketball Federation of Slovenia) Kansai Helios (2nd) |
| (Croatian Basketball Federation) Cedevita Junior (5th) | (Basketball Federation of Montenegro) Teodo Tivat (3rd)^{WC} | (Basketball Federation of Serbia) Vojvodina mts (1st) | (Basketball Federation of Slovenia) Ilirija (3rd) |

10 teams that hadn't been directly qualified, applied to participate for this season competition: Bosna Visit Sarajevo and Sloboda Tuzla from Bosnia and Herzegovina, Šibenka from Croatia, Teodo Tivat and Primorje 1945 from Montenegro, Rabotnički Skopje from North Macedonia, Vršac Meridianbet, Sloboda Užice and Radnički Kragujevac from Serbia and Šenčur from Slovenia.

After the announcement that wild card fee would cost 25,000 euros, the 9 teams applied for the wild card (all above except for Sloboda Užice and Radnički Kragujevac and with addition of TFT Mozzart Skopje), out of which the board of the ABA League decided that 4 teams (Bosna Visit Sarajevo, Vršac, Tivat and Rabotnički) would receive the wild card.

KK Dinamo Zagreb (fourth-placed team in the Croatian 2023-24 Favbet Premijer Liga) decided not to participate in this season ABA 2 League and chose to play FIBA competition instead. GKK Šibenka was then awarded an additional wild card to replace them.

Just seven days before playing their first match, KK Vršac Meridianbet decided to withdraw from the competition. Board of ABA League decided KK Joker from Sombor to take the vacant spot.

== Draw ==
The clubs were divided into 4 pots, based on the results in the NLB ABA League 2 and in the domestic championships in the previous season. While conducting the draw, a national criteria was also taken into account, to prevent two clubs from the same country to be placed within the same Regular Season Group.

Pot 1
| Team | Pos. |
|---|---|
| (Basketball Federation of North Macedonia) MZT Skopje | (1st) |
| (Basketball Federation of Montenegro) Podgorica | (1st) |
| (Basketball Federation of Serbia) Vojvodina | (1st) |
| (Basketball Federation of Serbia) Zlatibor | (3rd) |

Pot 3
| Team | Pos. |
|---|---|
| (Basketball Federation of Bosnia and Herzegovina) Bosna | (3rd) |
| (Croatian Basketball Federation) Cedevita Junior | (5th) |
| (Basketball Federation of Slovenia) Ilirija | (4th) |
| (Basketball Federation of North Macedonia) Pelister | (2nd) |

Pot 2
| Team | Pos. |
|---|---|
| (Basketball Federation of Bosnia and Herzegovina) Borac | (2nd) |
| (Basketball Federation of Slovenia) Helios Domžale | (2nd) |
| (Basketball Federation of Bosnia and Herzegovina) Široki | (4th) |
| (Basketball Federation of Montenegro) Sutjeska | (2nd) |

Pot 4
| Team | Pos. |
|---|---|
| (Basketball Federation of North Macedonia) Rabotnički | (3rd) |
| (Croatian Basketball Federation) Šibenka | (9th) |
| (Basketball Federation of Serbia) ~~Vršac~~ | (4th) |
| (Basketball Federation of Montenegro) Teodo Tivat | (3rd) |

== Regular season ==
=== Group A ===
| Pos | Team | Pld | W | L | PF | PA | PD | Pts | Qualification | HEL | CED | MZT | TIV |
|---|---|---|---|---|---|---|---|---|---|---|---|---|---|
| 1 | (Slovenia) Kansai Helios | 6 | 4 | 2 | 435 | 423 | +12 | 10 | Advance to the Top 8 | — | 78–80 | 68–67 | 69–62 |
| 2 | (Croatia) Cedevita Junior | 6 | 4 | 2 | 495 | 458 | +37 | 10 | Advance to the Top 8 | 79–87 | — | 77–75 | 80–55 |
| 3 | (North Macedonia) MZT Skopje Aerodrom | 6 | 3 | 3 | 437 | 414 | +23 | 9 | | 70–72 | 87–82 | — | 68–50 |
| 4 | (Montenegro) Teodo Tivat | 6 | 1 | 5 | 373 | 445 | −72 | 7 | | 65–61 | 76–97 | 65–70 | — |

Source: ABA 2
Legend: Blue = home team win; Red = away team win.

=== Group B ===
| Pos | Team | Pld | W | L | PF | PA | PD | Pts | Qualification | VOJ | BOS | SUT | RAB |
|---|---|---|---|---|---|---|---|---|---|---|---|---|---|
| 1 | (Serbia) Vojvodina mts | 6 | 5 | 1 | 498 | 440 | +58 | 11 | Advance to the Top 8 | — | 77–68 | 105–84 | 93–62 |
| 2 | (Bosnia and Herzegovina) Bosna Visit Sarajevo | 6 | 4 | 2 | 464 | 426 | +38 | 10 | Advance to the Top 8 | 60–70 | — | 78–74 | 84–58 |
| 3 | (Montenegro) Sutjeska Elektroprivreda | 6 | 3 | 3 | 492 | 470 | +22 | 9 | | 96–79 | 73–75 | — | 94–75 |
| 4 | (North Macedonia) Rabotnički | 6 | 0 | 6 | 397 | 515 | −118 | 6 | | 70–74 | 74–99 | 58–71 | — |

Source: ABA 2
Legend: Blue = home team win; Red = away team win.

=== Group C ===
| Pos | Team | Pld | W | L | PF | PA | PD | Pts | Qualification | JOK | ŠIR | POD | PEL |
|---|---|---|---|---|---|---|---|---|---|---|---|---|---|
| 1 | (Serbia) Joker | 6 | 5 | 1 | 504 | 480 | +24 | 11 | Advance to the Top 8 | — | 110–95 | 81–62 | 93–84 |
| 2 | (Bosnia and Herzegovina) Široki TT Kabeli | 6 | 3 | 3 | 500 | 463 | +37 | 9 | Advance to the Top 8 | 86–60 | — | 87–93 | 93–73 |
| 3 | (Montenegro) Podgorica | 6 | 3 | 3 | 467 | 467 | 0 | 9 | | 76–79 | 53–67 | — | 90–79 |
| 4 | (North Macedonia) Pelister | 6 | 1 | 5 | 461 | 522 | −61 | 7 | | 77–81 | 74–72 | 74–93 | — |

Source: ABA 2
Legend: Blue = home team win; Red = away team win.

=== Group D ===
| Pos | Team | Pld | W | L | PF | PA | PD | Pts | Qualification | ILI | ZLA | BBL | ŠIB |
|---|---|---|---|---|---|---|---|---|---|---|---|---|---|
| 1 | (Slovenia) Ilirija | 6 | 4 | 2 | 486 | 422 | +64 | 10 | Advance to the Top 8 | — | 69–58 | 62–70 | 80–54 |
| 2 | (Serbia) Zlatibor Mozzart | 6 | 4 | 2 | 494 | 478 | +16 | 10 | Advance to the Top 8 | 102–92 | — | 90–93 | 80–71 |
| 3 | (Bosnia and Herzegovina) Borac WWIN | 6 | 3 | 3 | 471 | 473 | −2 | 9 | | 77–88 | 85–91 | — | 59–73 |
| 4 | (Croatia) Šibenka | 6 | 1 | 5 | 396 | 474 | −78 | 7 | | 61–95 | 68–73 | 69–87 | — |

Source: ABA 2
Legend: Blue = home team win; Red = away team win.

== Top 8 ==
=== Group E ===
| Pos | Team | Pld | W | L | PF | PA | PD | Pts | Qualification | ZLA | BOS | HEL | POD |
|---|---|---|---|---|---|---|---|---|---|---|---|---|---|
| 1 | (Serbia) Zlatibor Mozzart | 6 | 5 | 1 | 483 | 492 | −9 | 11 | Advance to the Playoffs | — | 94–89 | 98–88 | 90–82 |
| 2 | (Bosnia and Herzegovina) Bosna Visit Sarajevo | 6 | 4 | 2 | 489 | 448 | +41 | 10 | Advance to the Playoffs | 98–57 | — | 77–64 | 71–69 |
| 3 | (Slovenia) Kansai Helios | 6 | 2 | 4 | 465 | 471 | −6 | 8 | | 65–72 | 73–76 | — | 92–89 |
| 4 | (Montenegro) Podgorica | 6 | 1 | 5 | 460 | 486 | −26 | 7 | | 70–72 | 91–78 | 59–83 | — |

Source: ABA 2
Legend: Blue = home team win; Red = away team win.

Notes

1. KK Joker withdrew from the competition after the regular season due to financial difficulties. KK Podgorica replaced them.

=== Group F ===
| Pos | Team | Pld | W | L | PF | PA | PD | Pts | Qualification | VOJ | ILI | ŠIR | CED |
|---|---|---|---|---|---|---|---|---|---|---|---|---|---|
| 1 | (Serbia) Vojvodina mts | 6 | 4 | 2 | 492 | 436 | +56 | 10 | Advance to the Playoffs | — | 105–68 | 62–56 | 100–75 |
| 2 | (Slovenia) Ilirija | 6 | 4 | 2 | 491 | 490 | +1 | 10 | Advance to the Playoffs | 86–81 | — | 82–69 | 89–74 |
| 3 | (Bosnia and Herzegovina) Široki TT Kabeli | 6 | 2 | 4 | 465 | 495 | −30 | 8 | | 78–68 | 90–86 | — | 70–76 |
| 4 | (Croatia) Cedevita Junior | 6 | 2 | 4 | 443 | 470 | −27 | 8 | | 73–76 | 71–80 | 96–80 | — |

Source: ABA 2
Legend: Blue = home team win; Red = away team win.

== Playoffs ==
=== Bracket ===
Semi-finals
9–23 April
(Basketball Federation of Serbia) Zlatibor Mozzart | 82 | 59 | 0
(Basketball Federation of Slovenia) Ilirija | 90 | 87 | 2
10–23 April
(Basketball Federation of Serbia) Vojvodina mts | 91 | 66 | 0
(Basketball Federation of Bosnia and Herzegovina) Bosna Visit Sarajevo | 92 | 75 | 2

Final
29 April–14 May
(Basketball Federation of Slovenia) Ilirija | 84 | 68 | 74 | 1
(Basketball Federation of Bosnia and Herzegovina) Bosna Visit Sarajevo | 79 | 77 | 88 | 2
