= KK Radnički Goražde =

Bosnian basketball team

- Basketball Championship of Bosnia and Herzegovina
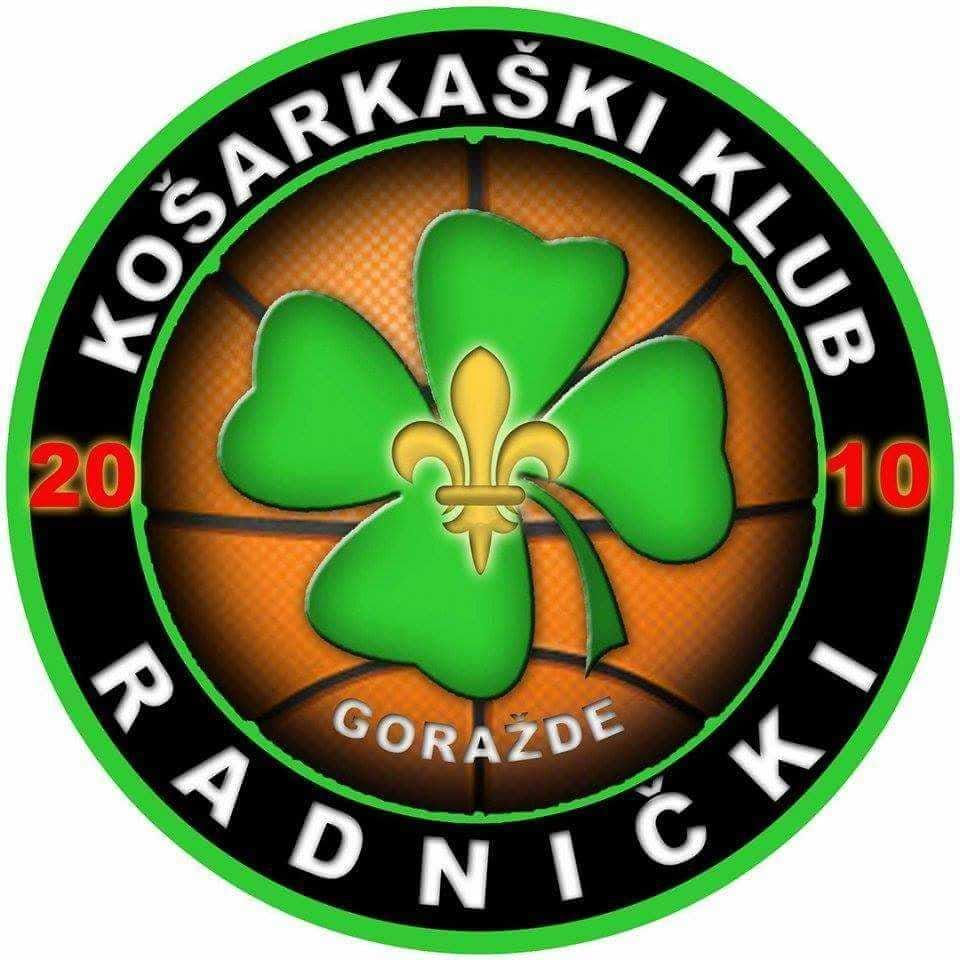
- Leagues: Bosnian League
- Founded: 2010; 15 years ago
- Arena: Mirsad Hurić City Hall (capacity: 1,600)
- Location: Goražde, Bosnia and Herzegovina
- Team colors
- Main sponsor: Pobjeda - Rudet
- President: Muhamed Hubanić
- Head coach: Hasan Rikalo
- Team captain: Adi Alikadić
- Division/conference titles: A1 2023-24 Season
- Website: Official website
Home	Away

Košarkaški klub Radnički Goražde (transl. Basketball Club "Workers' Club"), commonly referred to as KK Radnički, is a professional basketball club based in Goražde, Bosnia and Herzegovina. Having been the A1 champion by winning the A1 2023-24 Season. The club competes in the Basketball Championship of Bosnia and Herzegovina.

== History ==
The club was founded in 2010. After starting in the second-tier division, the club progressed to the first-tier division, eventually reaching the top-tier Basketball Championship of Bosnia and Herzegovina in 2024. This success solidified Radnički's status as the most successful basketball club of Goražde.

== Current roster ==
KK Radnički Goražde roster
Players
Coaches

Pos.	No.	Nat.	Name	Ht.	Wt.	Age
PG	1	(United States)	Wright, Jacobi Matthew	1.88 m (6 ft 2 in)
PF	25	(Bosnia and Herzegovina)	Bojanić, Vuk	2.03 m (6 ft 8 in)
PF	6	(Serbia)	Milivojević, Matija	2.02 m (6 ft 8 in)
C	17	(Serbia)	Vujović, Nikola	2.11 m (6 ft 11 in)
SF	9	(Bosnia and Herzegovina)	Klačar, Amar	1.99 m (6 ft 6 in)
SF	2	(Bosnia and Herzegovina)	Bećirović, Ajdin	1.99 m (6 ft 6 in)
C	11	(Bosnia and Herzegovina)	Krupalija, Timur	2.05 m (6 ft 9 in)
SG	5	(Bosnia and Herzegovina)	Alikadić, Adi (C)	1.9 m (6 ft 3 in)
SF	10	(Bosnia and Herzegovina)	Šuša, Ramiz	1.92 m (6 ft 4 in)
SF	25	(Bosnia and Herzegovina)	Vuković, Radoš	2.00 m (6 ft 7 in)
C	32	(Bosnia and Herzegovina)	Tadic, Željko	2.02 m (6 ft 8 in)
SG	23	(Bosnia and Herzegovina)	Šuša, Faris	1.92 m (6 ft 4 in)
SG	7	(United States)	Taylor, Lucas Joshua	1.95 m (6 ft 5 in)
PG	4	(Bosnia and Herzegovina)	Elez, Dušan	1.90 m (6 ft 3 in)
		(Bosnia and Herzegovina)	Kuljuh, Ajdin	1.96 m (6 ft 5 in)
		(Bosnia and Herzegovina)	Čarapić, Dušan	1.90 m (6 ft 3 in)
		(Bosnia and Herzegovina)	Andelija, Meldin	1.70 m (5 ft 7 in)

Head coach

- (Bosnia and Herzegovina) Hasan Rikalo

Assistant coach(es)

- (Bosnia and Herzegovina) Elvedin Klačar

Strength & conditioning coach(es)

- (Bosnia and Herzegovina) Tarik Žiga

Physiotherapist(s)

- (Bosnia and Herzegovina) Senad Odžaković

Team manager

- (Bosnia and Herzegovina) Amina Rikalo

Legend

- (C) Team captain
- Injured

== League achievements ==
- Bosnian A1 Liga Regular Season Runner-Up 2018.
- Bosnian A1 Liga Semifinals 2018.
- Bosnian A1 Liga Group South Regular Season Champion 2024.
- Bosnian A1 Liga Champion 2024.
