= 2016–17 Basketball Championship of Bosnia and Herzegovina =

Prvenstva BiH
- Teams: 11

Regular season
- Top seed: Igokea
- Relegated: Mladost Mrkonjić Grad

Finals
- Champions: Igokea
- Runners-up: Bosna Royal
- Semifinalists: Sloboda Tuzla; Zrinjski Mostar

The 2016–17 Basketball Championship of Bosnia and Herzegovina is the 16th season of this championship, with 11 teams from Bosnia and Herzegovina participating in it. Igokea, the defending champion, will join the tournament directly in the second stage.

== Regular season ==
| Pos | Team | Pld | W | L | GF | GA | GD | Pts | Qualification or relegation |
|---|---|---|---|---|---|---|---|---|---|
| 1 | Bosna Royal | 18 | 14 | 4 | 1468 | 1324 | +144 | 32 | Advance to Liga 6 |
| 2 | Sloboda Tuzla | 18 | 12 | 6 | 1392 | 1328 | +64 | 30 | Advance to Liga 6 |
| 3 | Spars Sarajevo | 18 | 11 | 7 | 1433 | 1348 | +85 | 29 | Advance to Liga 6 |
| 4 | Zrinjski Mostar | 18 | 11 | 7 | 1407 | 1359 | +48 | 29 | Advance to Liga 6 |
| 5 | Kakanj | 18 | 10 | 8 | 1411 | 1364 | +47 | 28 | Advance to Liga 6 |
| 6 | Široki | 18 | 7 | 11 | 1428 | 1434 | −6 | 25 | Advance to Relegation stage |
| 7 | Swisslion Leotar | 18 | 7 | 11 | 1321 | 1343 | −22 | 25 | Advance to Relegation stage |
| 8 | Građanski | 18 | 7 | 11 | 1377 | 1485 | −108 | 25 | Advance to Relegation stage |
| 9 | Bošnjak | 18 | 6 | 12 | 1271 | 1414 | −143 | 24 | Advance to Relegation stage |
| 10 | Mladost Mrkonjić Grad | 18 | 5 | 13 | 1379 | 1488 | −109 | 23 | Advance to Relegation stage |

Source: Eurobasket.com, Flashscores

== Second stage ==
=== Liga 6 ===
| Pos | Team | Pld | W | L | GF | GA | GD | Pts | Qualification |
|---|---|---|---|---|---|---|---|---|---|
| 1 | Igokea | 10 | 9 | 1 | 865 | 724 | +141 | 19 | Advance to playoffs |
| 2 | Bosna Royal | 10 | 7 | 3 | 828 | 763 | +65 | 17 | Advance to playoffs |
| 3 | Zrinjski Mostar | 10 | 5 | 5 | 837 | 817 | +20 | 15 | Advance to playoffs |
| 4 | Sloboda Tuzla | 10 | 5 | 5 | 723 | 775 | −52 | 15 | Advance to playoffs |
| 5 | Spars Sarajevo | 10 | 3 | 7 | 787 | 844 | −57 | 13 | |
| 6 | Kakanj | 10 | 1 | 9 | 673 | 790 | −117 | 11 | |

Source: Flashscore

=== Relegation group ===
| Pos | Team | Pld | W | L | GF | GA | GD | Pts | Relegation |
|---|---|---|---|---|---|---|---|---|---|
| 1 | Široki | 8 | 6 | 2 | 678 | 594 | +84 | 14 | |
| 2 | Swisslion Leotar | 8 | 4 | 4 | 636 | 661 | −25 | 12 | |
| 3 | Građanski | 8 | 4 | 4 | 622 | 629 | −7 | 12 | |
| 4 | Bošnjak | 8 | 3 | 5 | 637 | 673 | −36 | 11 | |
| 5 | Mladost Mrkonjić Grad | 8 | 3 | 5 | 650 | 666 | −16 | 11 | Relegation |

Source: Flashscore

== Playoffs ==
Semi-finals
Igokea | 86 | 103
Sloboda Tuzla | 85 | 65
Bosna Royal | 74 | 76
Zrinjski Mostar | 66 | 67

Final
Igokea | 87 | 71 | 74 | 81 | 96
Bosna Royal | 71 | 76 | 59 | 90 | 72
