= KK Student Mostar =

SKK Student Mostar
- Leagues: Basketball Championship of Bosnia and Herzegovina
- Founded: 2011
- Arena: Bijeli Brijeg Hall
- Capacity: 1,000
- Location: Mostar, BiH
- Team colors: Yellow and blue
- Championships: 2 (2015, 2017)

Košarkaški klub Student Mostar is a professional basketball club from Mostar, Bosnia and Herzegovina that competes in the Basketball Championship of Bosnia and Herzegovina. They play their home games at Školska dvorana Bijeli Brijeg, the same venue that hosts the rival team HKK Zrinjski Mostar.

The club had a lone season in the A2 Liga of Herceg-Bosne in 2011–12 before they were promoted to the A1 Liga for the 2012–13 season. After finishing fifth in 2013–14 with a 12–6 win–loss record, Student Mostar went on to win the 2014–15 Herceg-Bosne championship and earn promotion to the Basketball Championship of Bosnia and Herzegovina.

== Honours ==
- Herzeg-Bosnia League
  - Winners (2): 2014–15, 2016–17

== Notable players ==
- (Bosnia and Herzegovina) Mario Barbarić
