= Igor Bijelić =

Montenegrin basketball player

Free agent
- Position: Power forward
- League: Montenegrin Basketball League

Personal information
- Born: August 9, 1988 (age 38) Nikšić, SR Montenegro, SFR Yugoslavia
- Listed height: 6 ft 9 in (2.06 m)
- Listed weight: 240 lb (109 kg)

Career information
- NBA draft: 2010: undrafted
- Playing career: 2005–present

Career history
- 2005–2006: FMP
- 2006–2007: Mogren
- 2007–2009: Mornar
- 2009–2011: Danilovgrad
- 2011–2012: Servitium
- 2012–2013: Mladost Mrkonjić Grad
- 2013–2014: Feni Industries
- 2014: MBK Handlova
- 2014–2015: Rabotnički
- 2015–2016: Kumanovo
- 2017–2018: Sutjeska

Career highlights
- Macedonian Basketball Cup (2015)

Igor Bijelić (born Avgust 9, 1988) is a Montenegrin professional basketball player.
