= Petar Jovanović (basketball) =

Montenegrin basketball player and coach

Lovćen 1947
- Title: Head Coach
- League: Montenegrin League

Personal information
- Born: 9 April 1980 (age 46) Cetinje, SR Montenegro, SFR Yugoslavia
- Listed height: 1.95 m (6 ft 5 in)
- Listed weight: 88 kg (194 lb)

Career information
- NBA draft: 2002: undrafted
- Playing career: 2000–2017
- Position: Point guard
- Number: 5
- Coaching career: 2013–present

Career history

Playing
- 2010–2011: Leotar
- 2011–2012: Mladost Mrkonjić Grad
- 2014–2017: Lovćen 1947

Coaching
- 2013–2014: Lovćen 1947 (assistant)
- 2018, 2020–present: Lovćen 1947

Petar Jovanović (born 9 April 1980) is a Montenegrin basketball coach and former player who is the head coach for Lovćen 1947 of the Montenegrin League.

== Coaching career ==
On 15 February 2018, Jovanović became a head coach for the Montenegrin team Lovćen 1947 Cetinje. He left the post after the end of the 2017–18 season. On 3 August 2020, he signed back for Lovćen 1947 Cetinje

In 2023 he became coach of the National team MNE U16.
