= KK Donji Vakuf =

Basketball club in Donji Vakuf, Bosnia and Herzegovina

Promo Donji Vakuf
- Nickname: Yellow Tornado
- Leagues: Bosnia and Herzegovina Championship
- Founded: 1979; 47 years ago
- History: KK Radnik; 1979–1992; KK Donji Vakuf; 1996–present
- Arena: Donji Vakuf Sports Hall
- Capacity: 800
- Location: Donji Vakuf, Bosnia and Herzegovina
- Team colors: Blue and yellow
- Head coach: Denis Bajramović

Košarkaški klub Donji Vakuf (transl. Donji Vakuf Basketball Club), commonly referred to as Promo Donji Vakuf or Promo DV due to sponsorship reasons, is a men's professional basketball club based in Donji Vakuf, Central Bosnia Canton, Bosnia and Herzegovina. They are currently competing in the Bosnia and Herzegovina Championship.

== History ==
The club was founded in 1979 as KK Radnik. In 1996, following the end of the Bosnian War, the club was renamed to KK Donji Vakuf. Since 2011, the club bears the name KK Promo Donji Vakuf due to sponsorship reasons.

The club won the 2nd-tier A1 League in the 2018–19 season and got promoted to Bosnia and Herzegovina Championship for the 2019–20 season.

== Sponsorship naming ==
The club has had several denominations through the years due to its sponsorship:

- Donji Vakuf Komar Gips (2009–2011)
- Promo Donji Vakuf (2011–present)

== Home arena ==
The club plays its home games at the Donji Vakuf Sports Hall. The hall is located in Donji Vakuf, Central Bosnia Canton, and was built in 2016. It has a seating capacity of 800 seats.

== Head coaches ==
- (Bosnia and Herzegovina) Suad Hodžić (2014–2017)
- (Bosnia and Herzegovina) Ahmet Pašalić (2017–2018)
- (Bosnia and Herzegovina) Bakir Srna (2018–2019)
- (Bosnia and Herzegovina) Kenan Jugo (2019)
- (Bosnia and Herzegovina) Hamid Frljak (2019–2020)
- (Bosnia and Herzegovina) Slobodan Ninić (2020–2025)
- (Bosnia and Herzegovina) Dženan Rahimić (2025–2026)
- (Croatia) Denis Bajramović (2026–present)

== Trophies and awards ==
- Bosnian A1 League (2nd-tier)
  - Winners (1): 2018–19
