= KK Lovćen 1947 =

Lovćen 1947
- Leagues: Montenegrin League
- Founded: 1947; 79 years ago
- History: KK Lovćen (1947–present)
- Arena: Lovćen Sports Center
- Capacity: 1,500
- Location: Cetinje, Montenegro
- Team colors: Red, White
- President: Savo Parača
- Head coach: Petar Jovanović
- Website: kklovcen.me
Home	Away

Košarkaški klub Lovćen 1947, commonly referred to as KK Lovćen 1947, is a Montenegrin men's professional basketball club based in Cetinje. The team currently competes in the Montenegrin Basketball League. During their history, Lovćen competed in First League of FR Yugoslavia (Serbia and Montenegro), ABA League, Balkan International Basketball League and in the FIBA Korać Cup.

== History ==
In Cetinje basketball began to play after the end of World War II. Basketball Club Lovćen was created as a basketball section of Gymnastics Society from Cetinje.

Near the old football playground, in the city park, in 1947, the first basketball court was built in Cetinje.

First Lovćen's participation in a competition was the third Championship of Montenegro, in June 1949 in Cetinje.

Since 1952, the Basketball Championship in Montenegro was organized in two parts: the competition in the zones and the final part. For many years, Lovcen competed in the middle zone and in the final tournament for the champions of Montenegro.

In the 1950s, the reconstruction of the building "Military flat" was finished, and a large gymnasium hall for basketball and handball was made.

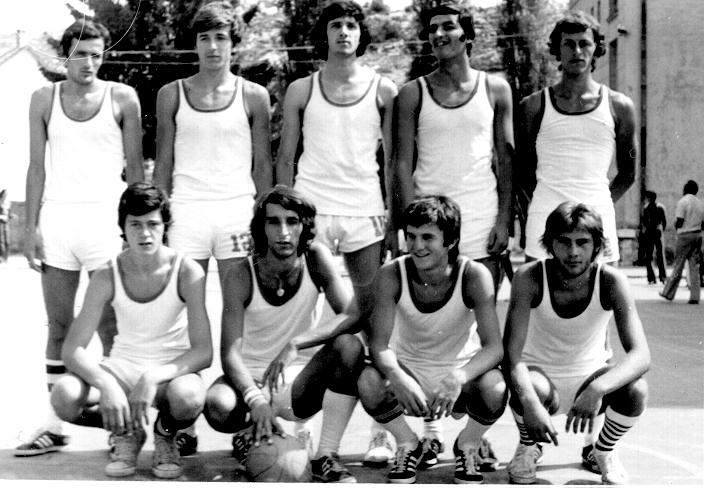
KK Lovcen, sezona 1974-75

The Montenegrin league was formed in 1970, and since then Lovcen has been a participant, where it was among the leading teams.

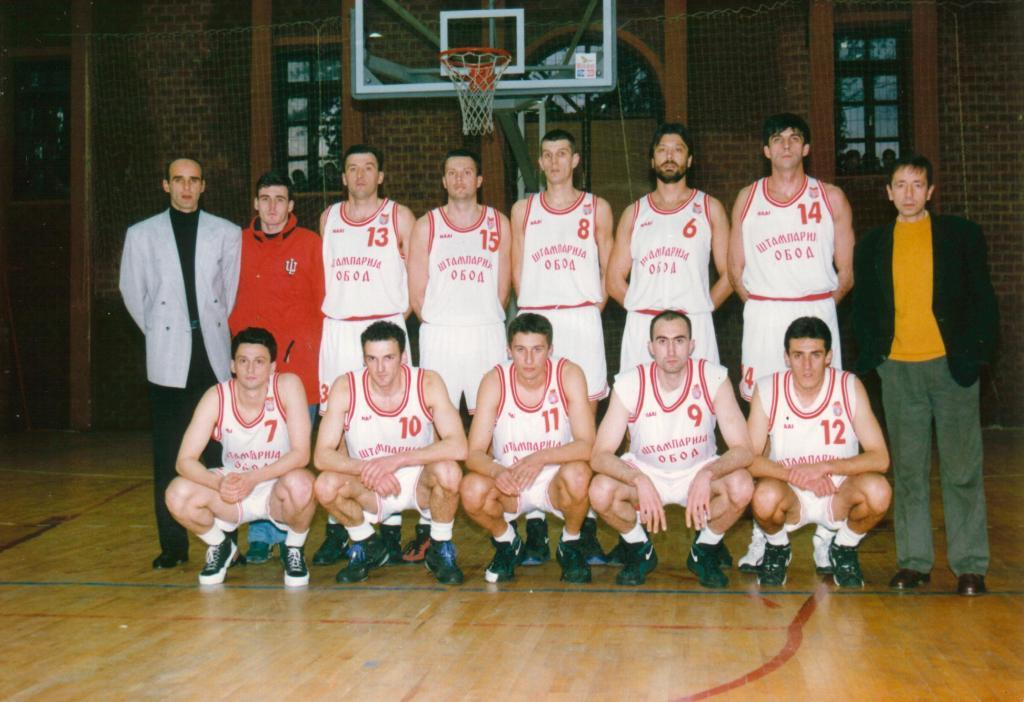
KK Lovcen, sezona 1995-96

After the earthquake, in 80s, new sports hall was built. Matches are still playing in it.

In 1983. Lovćen managed to be placed in the second division of the Yugoslavia and participated, with interruptions, until 1992.

From season 1992/93, Lovcen played in the first division of the FRY and achieved the greatest success in the second half of the nineties.

In 1997, Lovcen was first launched in the quarterfinals of the final tournament, winning a sixth place and placement in the final tournament in 1998. As a result, the club won first participation in European competition. In Korać Cup, Lovcen was playing with Italian Virtus, Slovenian Krka and Israeli Hapoel

The best major league standings, Lovcen achieved in 2001. when it won the fourth position.

In season 2003/04 Lovcen has performed in regional Adriatic league.

Lovcen was vice-champion of the first championship of independent Montenegro (2006/07), and that same year it starred in the final Cup Montenegro.

The most successful season was 2009/10, when Lovćen placed in the final four regional Balkan League in Sofia. After the victory over Macedonia Feni Industries, Lovćen was defeated in the finals of the host - Levski.

== Sponsorship naming ==
The club has had several denominations through the years due to its sponsorship:

- Lovćen osiguranje: 2000–2001
- Lovćen 1947 Bemax: 2019–2020

== Honours ==
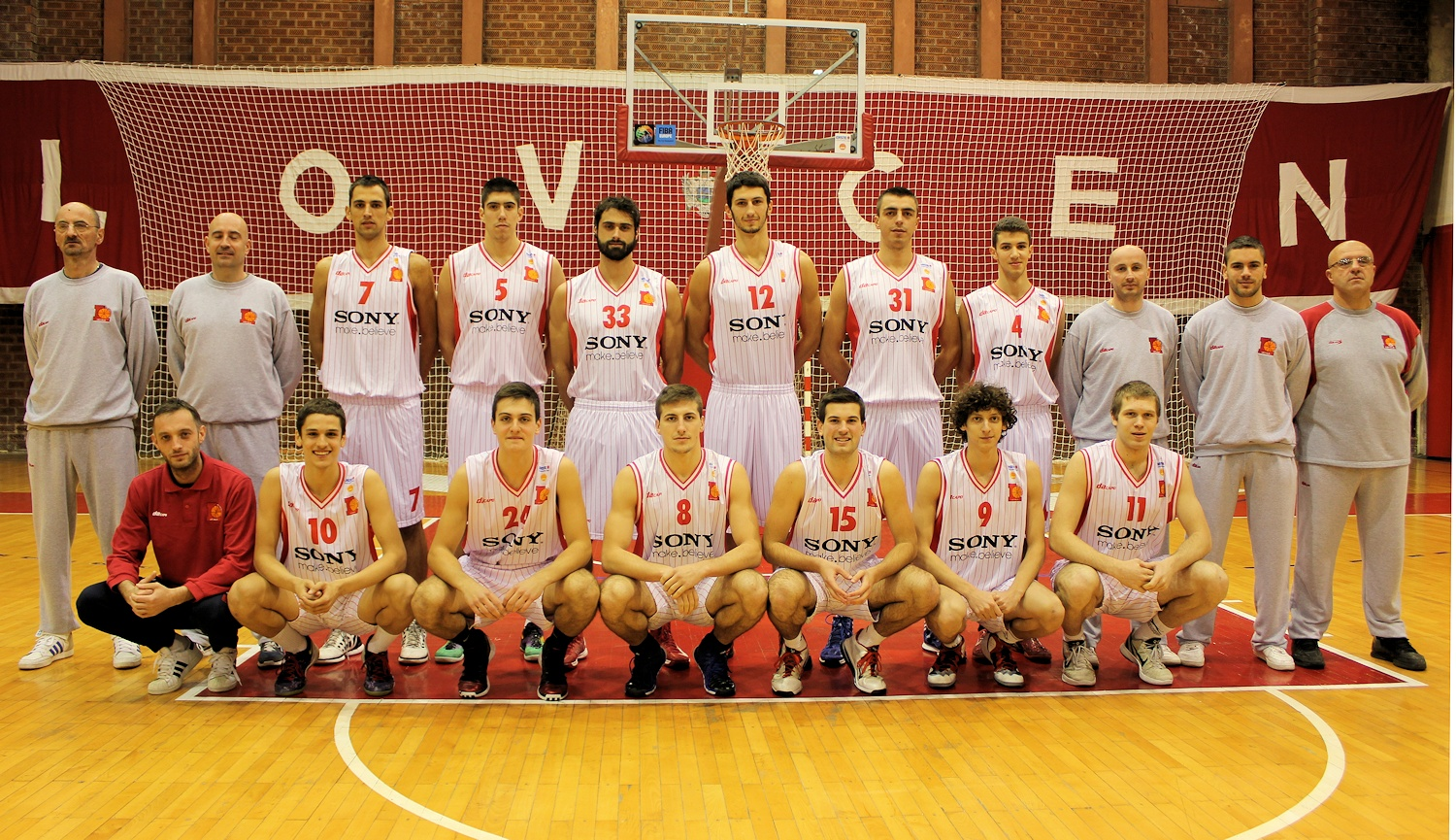
KK Lovćen (sezona 2013/14)

- Montenegrin League

Runners-up (2): 2007, 2009

- Montenegrin Cup

Runners-up (1): 2011

- Balkan IBL

Runners-up (1): 2010

=== First League seasons ===
Country	Season	Placement	M	W	L	Note
(Serbia and Montenegro)	1992/93	9th	36	14	22	
(Federal Republic of Yugoslavia)	1993/94	10th	32	14	18	
(Federal Republic of Yugoslavia)	1994/95	4th	14	10	4	
(Federal Republic of Yugoslavia)	1995/96	11th	36	15	21	
(Federal Republic of Yugoslavia)	1996/97	8th	26	12	14	Playoffs QF: Lovćen - Partizan 0:2
(Federal Republic of Yugoslavia)	1997/98	6th	26	14	12	Playoffs QF: Lovćen - Crvena zvezda 0:2
(Federal Republic of Yugoslavia)	1998/99	9th	22	9	13	
(Federal Republic of Yugoslavia)	1999/00	9th	22	8	14	
(Federal Republic of Yugoslavia)	2000/01	4th	22	13	9	Playoffs QF: Lovćen - Zdravlje 2:0, SF: Lovćen - Budućnost 0:3
(Federal Republic of Yugoslavia)	2001/02	5th	22	12	10	Playoffs QF: Lovćen - Hemofarm 1:2
(Federal Republic of Yugoslavia)	2002/03	6th	22	9	13	Playoffs QF: Lovćen - Crvena zvezda 0:2
(Federal Republic of Yugoslavia)	2003/04	8th	14	0	14	
(Federal Republic of Yugoslavia)	2004/05	13th	26	7	19	
(Montenegro)	2006/07	2nd	28	21	7	Playoffs SF: Lovćen - Ulcinj 2:0, FIN: Lovćen - Budućnost 0:3
(Montenegro)	2007/08	5th	28	14	14	
(Montenegro)	2008/09	7th	28	20	8	
(Montenegro)	2009/10	2nd	28	21	7	Playoffs SF: Lovćen - Mornar 2:1, FIN: Lovćen - Budućnost 0:3
(Montenegro)	2010/11	3rd	28	19	9	Playoffs SF: Lovćen - Mornar 0:2
(Montenegro)	2011/12	4th	28	16	12	Playoffs SF: Lovćen - Budućnost 0:2
(Montenegro)	2012/13	6th	28	13	15	
(Montenegro)	2013/14	5th	28	18	10	
(Montenegro)	2014/15	9th	28	14	14	
		OVERALL	572'	291	281	Championship Playoff games: 27 5-22

== Players ==
=== Current roster ===
Note: Flags indicate national team eligibility at FIBA-sanctioned events. Players may hold other non-FIBA nationalities not displayed.

Lovćen 1947 roster
Players
Coaches

Pos.	No.	Nat.	Name	Ht.	Age
PG	1	(United States)	Washington, Isaiah	1.85 m (6 ft 1 in)	28 – 20 July 1998
G	5	(Montenegro)	Jovanović, Mašan		20 – 5 December 2005
SG	7	(Montenegro)	Bogdanović, Bogdan	1.87 m (6 ft 2 in)	25 – 18 December 2000
PF	9	(Montenegro)	Novović, Miki	2.08 m (6 ft 10 in)	33 – 16 September 1992
SG	10	(Montenegro)	Mugoša, Marko	2.00 m (6 ft 7 in)	33 – 12 June 1993
SG	11	(Montenegro)	Vlahović, Stefan	1.94 m (6 ft 4 in)	25 – 9 January 2001
C	13	(Montenegro)	Bojanić, Vuk	2.10 m (6 ft 11 in)	23 – 24 May 2003
F	20	(Montenegro)	Parača, Nikola	2.00 m (6 ft 7 in)	26 – 10 September 1999
SG	23	(Sweden)	Clarance, Elijah	1.94 m (6 ft 4 in)	28 – 3 July 1998
SF	24	(Montenegro)	Banović, Dejan	2.00 m (6 ft 7 in)	24 – 18 September 2001
PF	34	(Montenegro)	Perović, Marko	2.03 m (6 ft 8 in)	34 – 1 March 1992
C	44	(Montenegro)	Hadžibegović, Alen	2.10 m (6 ft 11 in)	27 – 19 March 1999

Head coach

- (Montenegro) Petar Jovanović

Legend

- (C) Team captain
- (L) On loan
- Injured

== Notable players ==
- (Montenegro) Veselin Krivokapić
- (Montenegro) Dejan Radonjić
- (Montenegro) Nikola Vučurović
- (Montenegro) Ivan Koljević
- (Montenegro) Mašan Vrbica
- (Montenegro) Bojan Dubljević
- (Montenegro) Savo Đikanović
- (Montenegro) Goran Jeretin
- (Montenegro) Đuro Ostojić
- (Montenegro) Nebojša Bogavac
- (Montenegro) Vladimir Dragičević
- (Montenegro) Ranko Stevović
- (Montenegro) Ranko Čarapić
- (Montenegro) Petar Popović
- (Serbia) (Montenegro) Slobodan Tošić
- (Bosnia and Herzegovina) Bojan Pelkić
- (Kosovo) (Montenegro) Mikaile Tmušić
- (Albania) (Kosovo) (Montenegro) Ersid Ljuca
