= OKK Spars =

Basketball club in Ilidža, Bosnia and Herzegovina

Spars Sarajevo
- Leagues: Bosnian League; ABA League
- Founded: 2005; 21 years ago
- History: OKK Spars; 2005–2019; KK Spars Realway; 2019–2020; OKK Spars; 2021–present
- Arena: Arena Hills
- Location: Bosnia and Herzegovina; Sarajevo (2005–2022); Ilidža (2022–present)
- Team colors: Blue and white
- President: Nihad Selimović
- Head coach: Miodrag Kadija
- Championships: 1 A1 League (2013); 1 Bosnian Cup (2020)
- Website: kkspars.com

Omladinski košarkaški klub Spars, commonly referred to as OKK Spars or Spars Sarajevo, is a men's professional basketball club based in Ilidža, Bosnia and Herzegovina. The club competes in the Basketball Championship of Bosnia and Herzegovina and the ABA League Second Division.

The club is owned and operated by Nihad Selimović and a small group of partners.

== History ==
The club was founded in 2005 as OKK Spars and competed in lower-ranking divisions until joining 2nd-tier A1 League in the 2011–12 season. After winning the A1 League in the 2012–13 season, they were promoted to the Basketball Championship of Bosnia and Herzegovina for the 2013–14 season.

In December 2019, the club was merged with Realway, and changed its name to KK Spars Realway. However, on 31 December 2020, Spars and Realway parted their ways and the club changed its name back to OKK Spars.

== Sponsorship naming ==
Spars has had several denominations through the years due to its sponsorship.

- Spars Ilidža: 2022–present

== Logos ==
2020

2005–2019, 2021–present

== Home arenas ==
- Novo Sarajevo Sports Hall, also known as the Grbavica Sports Hall (2019–2022)
- Arena Hills (2022–present)

== Players ==
=== Current roster ===
Note: Flags indicate national team eligibility at FIBA-sanctioned events. Players may hold other non-FIBA nationalities not displayed.

Spars Ilidža roster
Players
Coaches

Pos.	No.	Nat.	Name	Ht.	Age
SF	3	(United States)	Burch-Manning, Trey	1.98 m (6 ft 6 in)	30 – 21 September 1995
PF	4	(Slovenia)	Durnik, Urban	2.04 m (6 ft 8 in)	29 – 19 June 1997
SG	5	(Serbia)	Vraneš, Miloš	2.01 m (6 ft 7 in)	31 – 25 April 1995
G	7	(Croatia)	Mustapić, Jakov	1.93 m (6 ft 4 in)	31 – 22 August 1994
SG	8	(Bosnia and Herzegovina)	Hasandić, Almir	1.90 m (6 ft 3 in)	35 – 19 October 1990
PG	9	(Montenegro)	Vrbica, Mašan	1.87 m (6 ft 2 in)	32 – 14 June 1994
G	10	(United States)	Abell, Remy	1.93 m (6 ft 4 in)	33 – 17 August 1992
C	11	(Bosnia and Herzegovina)	Polutak, Imran	2.09 m (6 ft 10 in)	30 – 9 July 1996
C	13	(Bosnia and Herzegovina)	Livadić, Reuf	2.13 m (7 ft 0 in)	26 – 20 June 2000
F	14	(Bosnia and Herzegovina)	Buza, Nedim	2.05 m (6 ft 9 in)	26 – 10 May 2000
G	20	(Croatia)	Butorac, Dino	1.92 m (6 ft 4 in)	35 – 8 October 1990
PG	28	(Bosnia and Herzegovina)	Gatarić, Aleksa	1.86 m (6 ft 1 in)	24 – 19 April 2002

Head coach

- (Montenegro) Miodrag Kadija

Assistant coach(es)

- (Bosnia and Herzegovina) Srđan Stanić

Legend

- (C) Team captain
- Injured

- Roster
Updated: July 10, 2022

== Trophies and awards ==
=== Trophies ===
- A1 League (2nd-tier)
  - Winners (1): 2012–13
- National Cup
  - Winners (1): 2020

== Head coaches ==
- (Bosnia and Herzegovina) Marko Trbić (2010–2018)
- (Bosnia and Herzegovina) Ivan Opačak (2018)
- (Bosnia and Herzegovina) Marko Trbić (2018–2019)
- (Bosnia and Herzegovina) Goran Šehovac (2019)
- (Bosnia and Herzegovina) Nermin Selimović (2019)
- (Bosnia and Herzegovina) Nedim Džemić (2020)
- (Montenegro) Miodrag Kadija (2021)
- (Montenegro) Zoran Kašćelan (2021)
- (Montenegro) Miodrag Kadija (2022–present)

== Youth system ==
The club's youth team competes in the Euroleague Basketball Next Generation Tournament. In the 2014–15 edition, Spars were invited to play in Madrid for the tournament's final stage.
