= KK Mladost Mrkonjić Grad =

- Nickname: Vukovi
- Leagues: Basketball Championship of Bosnia and Herzegovina
- Founded: 1970
- Arena: Arena Nove Banke Mrkonjić Grad (capacity: 1,000)
- Location: Mrkonjić Grad, Bosnia and Herzegovina
- Team colors: Red and Blue
- President: Krstan Tomić
- Head coach: Tihomir Mustapić
Home	Away

Košarkaški klub Mladost (Serbian Cyrillic: Кошаркашки клуб Младост), commonly referred to as KK Mladost Mrkonjić Grad or simply Mladost Mrkonjić Grad, is a men's professional basketball club based in Mrkonjić Grad, Republika Srpska, Bosnia and Herzegovina. Mladost competes in the Basketball Championship of Bosnia and Herzegovina.

== History ==
Mladost will participate at the first qualifying round to enter the inaugural season of the Adriatic League Second Division.

== Players ==
=== Notable players ===
- (Bosnia and Herzegovina) Predrag Malešević
- (Bosnia and Herzegovina) Siniša Protić
- (Bosnia and Herzegovina) Srđan Blanuša
- (Bosnia and Herzegovina) Siniša Zeljković
- (Bosnia and Herzegovina) Igor Cigale
- (Bosnia and Herzegovina) Nemanja Vujičić
- (Bosnia and Herzegovina) Vanja Sladojević
- (Bosnia and Herzegovina) Đorđe Aleksić
- (Bosnia and Herzegovina) Obrad Tomić
- (Bosnia and Herzegovina) Draško Knežević
- (Bosnia and Herzegovina) Filip Adamović
- (Bosnia and Herzegovina) Milan Kezić
- (Bosnia and Herzegovina) Arsenije Vučković
- (Bosnia and Herzegovina) Aleksandar Radukić
- (Bosnia and Herzegovina) Dragan Đuranović
- (Bosnia and Herzegovina) Stefan Mijović
- (Bosnia and Herzegovina) Gojko Sudžum
- (Montenegro) Miloš Komatina
- (Montenegro) Igor Bijelić
- (Montenegro) Ranko Velimirović
- (Serbia) Milijan Bocka
- (Serbia) Nikola Malešević
- (Serbia) Ninoslav Milošević
- (Serbia) Marko Jeremić
- (Serbia) Bogdan Riznić
- (Serbia) Sreten Knežević
- (Serbia) Vojin Svilar
- (Serbia) Koča Jovović
- (Serbia) Stefan Mitrović
- (Serbia) Đoko Šalić
- (Bosnia and Herzegovina) Dejan Ćup
- (Russia) Pavel Lobarev

Source: Eurobasket.com

== Seasons ==
- 2011–12 KK Mladost Mrkonjić Grad season
- 2012–13 KK Mladost Mrkonjić Grad season
