= Basketball Championship of Bosnia and Herzegovina =

Professional basketball league in Bosnia and Herzegovina

Liga BiH
- Founded: 1992; 34 years ago
- Country: Bosnia and Herzegovina
- Confederation: FIBA Europe
- Number of teams: 12
- Level on pyramid: 1
- Relegation to: Three 2nd-tier leagues
- Domestic cup: Mirza Delibašić Cup
- Current champions: Bosna (5th title)
- Most championships: Igokea; Široki (11 titles each)
- CEO: Miro Gugić
- Website: www.basket.ba/ksbih/bih
- 2025–26 season

The Basketball Championship of Bosnia and Herzegovina is the top–tier men's professional basketball league in Bosnia and Herzegovina for men and women, respectively. The league is operated by the Basketball Federation of Bosnia and Herzegovina.

== Competition format ==
The league is composed of 12 teams, each playing against the other eleven two times, home and away. After this portion concludes, the top six clubs are joined by the country's representatives in the Adriatic League, and enter "League 6". The best of these four teams go to the playoffs, and in the final best-of-five series, the Bosnian champion is crowned.

The eight teams who do not make the playoffs go on to compete in the "relegation league," where a team's object becomes maintaining its standing and ability to play in the competition the following year.

The women's league has ten clubs and operates in a similar way, in the final "League Six". Meanwhile, the teams not in the playoff race play to avoid relegation.

== Title holders ==
Prior to the 1997–98 season, there were three separate leagues in Bosnia-Herzegovina, each divided by ethnicity.

- 1993–94 Sloboda Tuzla
- 1994–95 KK Zenica Metalno
- 1995–96 Sloboda Tuzla
- 1996–97 Sloboda Tuzla

Between 1997 and 1999, there were two leagues in the country divided by the two official entities.

- 1997–98 HKK Široki (Note: The 1997-98 season only included teams from the Federation of Bosnia and Herzegovina and did not include teams from Republika Srpska, resulting in a non-unified league title)
- 1998–99 KK Bosna (Note: The 1998-99 season only included teams from the Federation of Bosnia and Herzegovina and did not include teams from Republika Srpska, resulting in a non-unified league title)

Since the 1999–2000 season, there has been a unified league and a single champion each year.

- 1999–00 Borac Nektar Banja Luka
- 2000–01 Igokea
- 2001–02 Feal Široki
- 2002–03 Feal Široki
- 2003–04 Široki Hercegtisak
- 2004–05 Bosna ASA BH Telecom
- 2005–06 Bosna ASA BH Telecom
- 2006–07 Široki HT Eronet
- 2007–08 Bosna ASA BH Telecom
- 2008–09 Široki Prima pivo
- 2009–10 Široki TT Kabeli
- 2010–11 Široki TT Kabeli
- 2011–12 Široki WWin
- 2012–13 Igokea Laktaši
- 2013–14 Igokea Laktaši
- 2014–15 Igokea Laktaši
- 2015–16 Igokea Laktaši
- 2016–17 Igokea Laktaši
- 2017–18 Zrinjski Mostar
- 2018–19 Široki
- 2019–20 Igokea Laktaši
- 2020–21 Široki
- 2021–22 Igokea Laktaši
- 2022–23 Igokea Laktaši
- 2023–24 Igokea Laktaši
- 2024–25 Igokea Laktaši
- 2025–26 Bosna BH Telecom

=== Titles by club ===
Club	Trophies	Years won
Igokea	11	2001, 2013, 2014, 2015, 2016, 2017, 2020, 2022, 2023, 2024, 2025
Široki	11	1998, (Note: The 1997–98 season only included teams from the Federation of Bosnia and Herzegovina and did not include teams from Republika Srpska, resulting in a non-unified league title) 2002, 2003, 2004, 2007, 2009, 2010, 2011, 2012, 2019, 2021
Bosna	5	1999, (Note: The 1998–99 season only included teams from the Federation of Bosnia and Herzegovina and did not include teams from Republika Srpska, resulting in a non-unified league title) 2005, 2006, 2008, 2026
Sloboda Tuzla	3	1994, 1996, 1997
KK Zenica Metalno	1	1995
Borac Banja Luka	1	2000
Zrinjski	1	2018

=== All–time national champions ===
Total number of national champions won by Bosnian clubs. Table includes titles won during the Yugoslav First Federal League (1945–1992).

Club	Trophies	Years won
Široki	11	1998, 2002, 2003, 2004, 2007, 2009, 2010, 2011, 2012, 2019, 2021
Igokea	11	2001, 2013, 2014, 2015, 2016, 2017, 2020, 2022, 2023, 2024, 2025
Bosna	8	1978, 1980, 1983, 1999, 2005, 2006, 2008, 2026
Sloboda Tuzla	3	1994, 1996, 1997
KK Zenica Metalno	1	1995
Borac Banja Luka	1	2000
Zrinjski	1	2018

== 2024–25 teams ==
Locations of the 2024–25 Basketball Championship of Bosnia and Herzegovina teams

Team	City	Venue
Borac WWin	Banja Luka	Borik Sports Hall
Bosna BH Telecom	Sarajevo	Mirza Delibašić Hall
Igokea m:tel	Laktaši	Laktaši Sports Hall
Jahorina	Pale	Peki Sports Hall
Leotar	Trebinje	Miloš Mrdić Sports Hall
Mladost	Mrkonjić Grad	Nova Banka Sports Hall
Mostar	Mostar	Bijeli Brijeg Sports Hall
Orlovik Nansi	Žepče	Catholic school center "Don Bosco"
Posušje	Posušje	Posušje City Sports Hall
Promo	Donji Vakuf	Peace and Friendship Sports Hall
Radnički	Goražde	Mirsad Hurić City Hall
Slavija 1996	Istočno Sarajevo	Istočno Sarajevo Sports Hall
Sloboda	Tuzla	Mejdan Sports Hall
Spars	Sarajevo	Goran Čengić Sports Hall
Široki	Široki Brijeg	Pecara Sports Hall

Teams that play in the 2024–25 Adriatic League First Division
Teams that play in the 2024–25 Adriatic League Second Division

== See also ==
- Basketball Cup of Bosnia and Herzegovina
- Bosnian Basketball All-Star Game
- Second level basketball leagues in Bosnia and Herzegovina
