= 2009–10 VTB United League =

VTB United League
- Season: 2009–10
- Duration: 14 October 2009 – 22 January 2010
- Teams: 8

Regular season
- Season MVP: (Russia) Victor Khryapa

Finals
- Champions: (Russia) CSKA Moscow (2nd title)
- Runners-up: (Russia) UNICS Kazan
- Final Four MVP: (Russia) J.R. Holden

Statistical leaders
| Points | (Slovenia) Hasan Rizvić | 20.0 |

The VTB United League 2009–10 was the first complete season of the VTB United League, which is Eastern Europe's (and the Baltic region's) top-tier level competition for men's professional basketball clubs.

== Teams of the 2009–10 season ==
| Country (League) | Teams |
|---|---|
| Estonia (KML) | Kalev Tallinn |
| Latvia (LBL) | VEF Rīga |
| Lithuania (LKL) | Žalgiris Kaunas |
| Russia (Superleague A) | CSKA Moscow |
| Russia (Superleague A) | Khimki Moscow Region |
| Russia (Superleague A) | UNICS Kazan |
| Ukraine (SuperLeague) | Azovmash Mariupol |
| Ukraine (SuperLeague) | Donetsk |

== Group stage ==
Key to colors
| Top two places in each group advance to Final Four |
| Eliminated |

=== Group A ===
| | Team | Pld | W | L | PF | PA | Diff |
|---|---|---|---|---|---|---|---|
| 1. | (Russia) UNICS Kazan | 6 | 5 | 1 | 500 | 443 | +57 |
| 2. | (Russia) Khimki Moscow Region | 6 | 4 | 2 | 495 | 443 | +52 |
| 3. | (Ukraine) Donetsk | 6 | 3 | 3 | 475 | 486 | −11 |
| 4. | (Latvia) VEF Rīga | 6 | 0 | 6 | 438 | 536 | −98 |

Game 1

14 October 2009
18:00

Report

| VEF Rīga (Latvia) | 72–76 | (Russia) UNICS Kazan |
Scoring by quarter: 21–23, 13–20, 18–15, 20–18
| Pts: Bankevics 16; Rebs: Labuckas 8 Asts: Labuckas 4 | | Pts: Popović, Veremeenko 14; Rebs: Lončar 8 Asts: Samoylenko 3 |

15 October 2009
19:00

Report

| Donetsk (Ukraine) | 70–69 | (Russia) Khimki Moscow Region |
Scoring by quarter: 23–19, 18–25, 10–18, 19–7
| Pts: Perry 15; Rebs: Owens 10; Asts: Perry, Aleksić, Šundov 2 | | Pts: Mozgov 17; Rebs: Jankūnas 8 Asts: López 4 |

Game 2

30 October 2009

Report

| Donetsk (Ukraine) | 78–98 | (Russia) UNICS Kazan |
Scoring by quarter: 22–34, 22–24, 16–20, 18–20
| Pts: Perry 14; Rebs: Tucker 6 Asts: Perry 3 | | Pts: Popović 30; Rebs: Zamanski 7 Asts: Popović 6 |

1 November 2009
18:00

Report

| Khimki Moscow Region (Russia) | 103–66 | (Latvia) VEF Rīga |
Scoring by quarter: 22–8, 24–17, 35–18, 22–23
| Pts: Javtokas 17; Rebs: Jankūnas 8 Asts: Fridzon 9 | | Pts: Bankevics 16; Rebs: Nelyubov 9 Asts: Renfroe 4 |

Game 3

18 November 2009
17:00

Report

| VEF Rīga (Latvia) | 76–86 | (Ukraine) Donetsk |
Scoring by quarter: 23–22, 15–22, 13–15, 25–27
| Pts: Renfroe 28; Rebs: Nelyubov 9 Asts: Renfroe 9 | | Pts: Marsh 23; Rebs: Tucker 8 Asts: Perry 4 |

18 November 2009
19:00

Report

| UNICS Kazan (Russia) | 82–69 | (Russia) Khimki Moscow Region |
Scoring by quarter: 28–29, 16–15, 23–8, 15–17
| Pts: Štombergas 17; Rebs: Zamanski 9 Asts: Popović 3 | | Pts: McCarty 19; Rebs: McCarty 11; Asts: Javtokas 3 |

Game 4

5 December 2009
18:00

Report

| Khimki Moscow Region (Russia) | 78–68 | (Ukraine) Donetsk |
Scoring by quarter: 17–16, 24–15, 23–16, 14–21
| Pts: Jankūnas 16; Rebs: Javtokas 9 Asts: Fridzon 4 | | Pts: Tucker 19; Rebs: Owens, Tucker 8 Asts: Perry 5 |

5 December 2009
18:00

Report

| UNICS Kazan (Russia) | 85–61 | (Latvia) VEF Rīga |
Scoring by quarter: 15–15, 23–14, 22–12, 25–20
| Pts: Popović 18; Rebs: Zamanski, Štombergas 5 Asts: Samoylenko 5 | | Pts: Labuckas 12; Rebs: Aleksejevs 6 Asts: Bankevics, Renfroe 3 |

Game 5

19 December 2009
19:00

Report

| UNICS Kazan (Russia) | 85–77 | (Ukraine) Donetsk |
Scoring by quarter: 24–20, 17–25, 21–9, 23–23
| Pts: Kuzyakin 21; Rebs: Zamanski 14; Asts: Samoylenko 6 | | Pts: Drozdov 22; Rebs: Aleksić 8 Asts: Mažutis 4 |

19 December 2009
17:00

Report

| VEF Rīga (Latvia) | 83–90 | (Russia) Khimki Moscow Region |
Scoring by quarter: 23–22, 14–27, 24–24, 22–17
| Pts: Renfroe 30; Rebs: Nelyubov 6 Asts: Renfroe 9 | | Pts: McCarty 19; Rebs: McCarty 9 Asts: Langford 5 |

Game 6

22 December 2009
19:00

Report

| Khimki Moscow Region (Russia) | 86–74 | (Russia) UNICS Kazan |
Scoring by quarter: 23–19, 18–12, 22–19, 23–24
| Pts: Langford 37; Rebs: Langford 8 Asts: Langford, Jankūnas, Javtokas 3 | | Pts: Lončar 19; Rebs: Lončar 7 Asts: four players with 2 |

9 January 2010
15:00

Report

| Donetsk (Ukraine) | 96–80 | (Latvia) VEF Rīga |
Scoring by quarter: 27–12, 21–13, 29–20, 19–35
| Pts: Owens 23; Rebs: Owens 9 Asts: Perry, Aleksić, Tsintsadze 3 | | Pts: Labuckas 21; Rebs: Labuckas 10; Asts: four players with 2 |

=== Group B ===
| | Team | Pld | W | L | PF | PA | Diff |
|---|---|---|---|---|---|---|---|
| 1. | (Russia) CSKA Moscow | 6 | 5 | 1 | 507 | 392 | +115 |
| 2. | (Lithuania) Žalgiris Kaunas | 6 | 5 | 1 | 477 | 411 | +66 |
| 3. | (Ukraine) Azovmash Mariupol | 6 | 2 | 4 | 469 | 487 | −18 |
| 4. | (Estonia) Kalev Tallinn | 6 | 0 | 6 | 370 | 533 | −163 |

Game 1

15 October 2009
18:45

Report

| Kalev Tallinn (Estonia) | 61–100 | (Ukraine) Azovmash Mariupol |
Scoring by quarter: 4–21, 17–24, 19–33, 21–22
| Pts: Keerles 23; Rebs: Dorbek 6 Asts: Sokk 4 | | Pts: Serapinas 21; Rebs: Daniels 8 Asts: Skutelnik 4 |

15 October 2009
20:00

Report

| CSKA Moscow (Russia) | 90–74 | (Lithuania) Žalgiris Kaunas |
Scoring by quarter: 20–20, 24–18, 24–21, 22–15
| Pts: Vorontsevich 16; Rebs: Vorontsevich 6 Asts: Langdon 5 | | Pts: Kalnietis, Šalenga 18; Rebs: Watson 14; Asts: Brown 5 |

Game 2

31 October 2009
14:00

Report

| Azovmash Mariupol (Ukraine) | 65–84 | (Russia) CSKA Moscow |
Scoring by quarter: 16–21, 19–20, 25–20, 5–23
| Pts: Daniels 16; Rebs: Rizvić 7 Asts: Jarutis 7 | | Pts: Langdon 22; Rebs: Khryapa 11; Asts: Khryapa 5 |

1 November 2009
16:00

Report

| Žalgiris Kaunas (Lithuania) | 88–56 | (Estonia) Kalev Tallinn |
Scoring by quarter: 10–13, 23–12, 26–15, 29–16
| Pts: Janavičius 14; Rebs: Janavičius 6 Asts: Pocius, Janavičius 5 | | Pts: Akognon, Veski 18; Rebs: Miller 8 Asts: Sokk 6 |

Game 3

18 November 2009
19:00

Report

| Žalgiris Kaunas (Lithuania) | 82–69 | (Ukraine) Azovmash Mariupol |
Scoring by quarter: 21–22, 20–10, 24–22, 17–15
| Pts: Brown 37; Rebs: Watson 17; Asts: Brown, Pocius 4 | | Pts: Rizvić 16; Rebs: Daniels, Ugboaja 6 Asts: Daniels 4 |

19 November 2009
18:45

Report

| Kalev Tallinn (Estonia) | 63–85 | (Russia) CSKA Moscow |
Scoring by quarter: 18–21, 18–24, 13–24, 14–16
| Pts: Keerles 21; Rebs: Fisher 7 Asts: Johnson 3 | | Pts: Šiškauskas 17; Rebs: Khryapa 13; Asts: Khryapa 5 |

Game 4

5 December 2009
15:00

Report

| Azovmash Mariupol (Ukraine) | 91–78 | (Estonia) Kalev Tallinn |
Scoring by quarter: 25–20, 24–21, 22–16, 20–21
| Pts: Rizvić 29; Rebs: Rizvić 13; Asts: Jarutis 5 | | Pts: Akognon 19; Rebs: Fisher 7 Asts: Sokk, Akognon 5 |

6 December 2009
16:00

Report

| Žalgiris Kaunas (Lithuania) | 67–63 | (Russia) CSKA Moscow |
Scoring by quarter: 17–21, 17–13, 11–14, 22–15
| Pts: Brown 26; Rebs: Brown, Watson 7 Asts: Janavičius, Kalnietis 3 | | Pts: Planinić 26; Rebs: Khryapa, Planinić 6 Asts: Khryapa, Planinić 4 |

Game 5

19 December 2009
18:00

Report

| CSKA Moscow (Russia) | 98–69 | (Ukraine) Azovmash Mariupol |
Scoring by quarter: 23–17, 25–18, 27–16, 23–18
| Pts: Kurbanov 13; Rebs: Vorontsevich, Khryapa 8 Asts: Khryapa 7 | | Pts: Rizvić 20; Rebs: Rizvić 9 Asts: House 3 |

20 December 2009
16:00

Report

| Kalev Tallinn (Estonia) | 58–82 | (Lithuania) Žalgiris Kaunas |
Scoring by quarter: 15–24, 14–21, 13–23, 16–14
| Pts: Akognon 17; Rebs: Keerles 6 Asts: Sokk, Keerles 2 | | Pts: Watson 24; Rebs: Watson 6 Asts: Brown 4 |

Game 6

9 January 2010
14:00

Report

| Azovmash Mariupol (Ukraine) | 75–84 | (Lithuania) Žalgiris Kaunas |
Scoring by quarter: 23–17, 20–18, 20–27, 12–22
| Pts: Rizvić 20; Rebs: Daniels 8 Asts: Jarutis 5 | | Pts: Pocius 28; Rebs: Vene 7 Asts: Kalnietis, Klimavičius 4 |

10 January 2010
18:00

Report

| CSKA Moscow (Russia) | 87–54 | (Estonia) Kalev Tallinn |
Scoring by quarter: 18–8, 17–23, 26–8, 26–15
| Pts: Kaun 21; Rebs: Kaun, Planinić 10; Asts: Khryapa 8 | | Pts: Akognon 10; Rebs: Keerles 11; Asts: Sokk 4 |

== Final four ==
The Final Four took place between January 21 and 22, 2010 in Kaunas, Lithuania at Kaunas Sports Hall, the home court of Žalgiris Kaunas. The following teams qualified:

- (Russia) CSKA Moscow
- (Russia) Khimki Moscow Region
- (Russia) UNICS Kazan
- (Lithuania) Žalgiris Kaunas

=== Semifinals ===
21 January 2010
18:00

Report

| CSKA Moscow (Russia) | 71–66 | (Russia) Khimki Moscow Region |
Scoring by quarter: 14–12, 15–21, 24–20, 18–13
| Pts: Planinić 16; Rebs: Šiškauskas 7 Asts: Planinić 5 | | Pts: Fridzon 16; Rebs: Mozgov 11; Asts: Cabezas 4 |

Kaunas Sports Hall

21 January 2010
21:00

Report

| UNICS Kazan (Russia) | 75–65 | (Lithuania) Žalgiris Kaunas |
Scoring by quarter: 20–17, 16–18, 19–9, 20–21
| Pts: Lončar 20; Rebs: Lončar 7 Asts: Popović 7 | | Pts: Klimavičius 17; Rebs: Klimavičius, Begić 7 Asts: Ćapin 4 |

Kaunas Sports Hall

=== Third-place playoff ===
22 January 2010
18:30

Report

| Khimki Moscow Region (Russia) | 72–78 | (Lithuania) Žalgiris Kaunas |
Scoring by quarter: 12–24, 23–14, 18–16, 19–24
| Pts: Langford 20; Rebs: McCarty, Mozgov 7 Asts: McCarty 3 | | Pts: Pocius 26; Rebs: Delaš 5 Asts: Ćapin 4 |

Kaunas Sports Hall

=== Final ===
22 January 2010
21:00

Report

| UNICS Kazan (Russia) | 55–66 | (Russia) CSKA Moscow |
Scoring by quarter: 14–17, 11–22, 19–18, 11–9
| Pts: Lampe 21; Rebs: Lampe 6 Asts: Popović, Samoylenko 3 | | Pts: Holden, Kaun 16; Rebs: Mensah-Bonsu 6 Asts: Šiškauskas, Vorontsevich 3 |

Kaunas Sports Hall

VTB United League 2009–10

CSKA Moscow
2nd Title

Final Four MVP
(Russia) J.R. Holden

== Individual awards ==
=== All-Round 1 Team ===
- Andrey Vorontsevich – MVP (CSKA)
- Timofey Mozgov (Khimki)
- Chris Owens (Donetsk)
- Martynas Mažeika (VEF)
- Marko Popović (UNICS)

=== All-Round 2 Team ===
- Marko Popović – MVP (UNICS)
- Krešimir Lončar (UNICS)
- Victor Khryapa (CSKA)
- Robertas Javtokas (Khimki)
- Zygimantas Janavicius (Zalgiris)

=== All-Round 3 Team ===
- Marcus Brown – MVP (Zalgiris)
- Artur Drozdov (Donetsk)
- Saulius Štombergas (UNICS)
- Victor Khryapa (CSKA)
- Alex Renfroe (VEF)

=== All-Round 4 Team ===
- Marcus Brown – MVP (Zalgiris)
- Zoran Planinić (CSKA)
- Marko Popović (UNICS)
- Paulius Jankūnas (Khimki)
- Hasan Rizvić (Azovmash)

=== All-Round 5 Team ===
- Victor Khryapa – MVP (CSKA)
- Kelly McCarty (Khimki)
- Travis Watson (Zalgiris)
- Igor Zamanskiy (UNICS)
- Alex Renfroe (VEF)

=== All-Tournament Team ===
- Martynas Pocius (Zalgiris)
- Maciej Lampe (UNICS)
- Sasha Kaun (CSKA)
- Vitaly Fridzon (Khimki)
- Marko Popović (UNICS)

== MVPs ==
| Regular Season MVP | | Final Four MVP | |
| MVP | Team | MVP | Team |
| (Russia) Victor Khryapa | (Russia) CSKA Moscow | (Russia) J.R. Holden | (Russia) CSKA Moscow |
