= 2010–11 Euroleague Regular Season Group A =

Results

Standings and Results for Group A of the Regular Season phase of the 2010–11 Euroleague basketball tournament.

== Standings ==
Key to colors
Top four places in each group advance to Top 16

	Team	Pld	W	L	PF	PA	Diff	Tie-break
1.	(Israel) Maccabi Tel Aviv	10	9	1	799	700	+99	
2.	(Spain) Caja Laboral	10	5	5	809	784	+25	2–2 +15
3.	(Lithuania) Žalgiris	10	5	5	762	765	−3	2–2 +3
4.	(Serbia) Partizan	10	5	5	658	717	−59	2–2 −18
5.	(Russia) Khimki	10	4	6	764	753	+11	
6.	(Poland) Asseco Prokom	10	2	8	689	762	−73	

== Fixtures and results ==
All times given below are in Central European Time.

=== Game 1 ===
20 October 2010
18:00

Report

Khimki (Russia)	82–76	(Poland) Asseco Prokom
Scoring by quarter: 18–14, 19–21, 26–20, 19–21
Pts: Langford 17; Rebs: Savrasenko 7 Asts: Monia 4		Pts: Giddens 20; Rebs: Giddens 10; Asts: Ewing 3

Basketball Center of Moscow Region, Moscow
Attendance: 3,700
Referees: Recep Ankarali (TUR), Dubravko Muhvic (CRO), Tomas Jasevicius (LTU)

21 October 2010
18:45

Report

Žalgiris (Lithuania)	73–62	(Serbia) Partizan
Scoring by quarter: 19–17, 24–12, 19–16, 11–17
Pts: Pocius 17; Rebs: Jankūnas 7 Asts: Pocius 3		Pts: Kecman 13; Rebs: Kecman, Lešić 6 Asts: four players 2

Kaunas Sports Hall, Kaunas
Attendance: 5,000
Referees: Volodymr Drabikovsky (UKR), Sergey Mikhaylov (RUS), Apostolos Kalpakas (SWE)

22 October 2010
20:30

Report

Caja Laboral (Spain)	94–78	(Israel) Maccabi Tel Aviv
Scoring by quarter: 31–11, 26–21, 19–17, 18–29
Pts: Logan 25; Rebs: Emeterio 11; Asts: Emeterio 5		Pts: Eidson 14; Rebs: Eidson 7 Asts: Eidson 8

Fernando Buesa Arena, Vitoria-Gasteiz
Attendance: 9,700
Referees: Guerrino Cerebuch (ITA), Fernando Rocha (POR), Elias Koromilas (GRE)

=== Game 2 ===
27 October 2010
19:45

Report

Asseco Prokom (Poland)	73–80	(Spain) Caja Laboral
Scoring by quarter: 15–20, 23–21, 16–21, 19–18
Pts: Brown 19; Rebs: Hrycaniuk 9 Asts: Brown 4		Pts: Barać 18; Rebs: Barać 9 Asts: Huertas 8

Gdynia Sports Arena, Gdynia
Attendance: 4,897
Referees: Carl Jungebrand (FIN), Spiros Gkontas (GRE), Milija Vojinovic (SRB)

27 October 2010
20:45

Report

Partizan (Serbia)	72–68	(Russia) Khimki
Scoring by quarter: 21–19, 15–18, 13–16, 23–15
Pts: Jawai 15; Rebs: Jawai 8 Asts: Lafayette 4		Pts: Langford 19; Rebs: Lončar 9 Asts: Langford, Planinić 2

Hala Pionir, Belgrade
Attendance: 7,035
Referees: Christos Christodoulou (GRE), Eddie Viator(FRA), Oscar Perea(ESP)

28 October 2010
20:00

Report

Maccabi Tel Aviv (Israel)	86–70	(Lithuania) Žalgiris
Scoring by quarter: 25–11, 22–16, 18–24, 21–19
Pts: Schortsanitis 24; Rebs: Hendrix 9 Asts: Perkins 8		Pts: Jankūnas 17; Rebs: Begić, Watson 4 Asts: Jankūnas, Collins 3

Yad Eliyahu Arena, Tel Aviv
Attendance: 11,000
Referees: Ilija Belosevic (SRB), Carmelo Paternico (ITA), Marko Juras (SRB)

=== Game 3 ===
3 November 2010
18:00

Report

Khimki (Russia)	64–60	(Spain) Caja Laboral
Scoring by quarter: 11–17, 18–14, 24–16, 11–13
Pts: Langford 19; Rebs: Eze 7 Asts: Langford, López 4		Pts: San Emeterio 18; Rebs: Barać 12; Asts: Huertas 4

Basketball Center of Moscow Region, Moscow
Attendance: 3,200
Referees: Saša Pukl (SVN), Jakob Zamojski (POL), David Chambon (FRA)

3 November 2010
18:45

Report

Žalgiris (Lithuania)	74–68 (OT)	(Poland) Asseco Prokom
Scoring by quarter: 27–14, 14–16, 5–17, 15–14, Overtime: 13–7
Pts: Pocius 18; Rebs: Jankūnas 9 Asts: Delininkaitis 3		Pts: Ewing 14; Rebs: Giddens 9 Asts: Ewing, Brown 2

Kaunas Sports Hall, Kaunas
Attendance: 4,810
Referees: José Martín (ESP), Sradan Dozai (CRO), Antonio Conde (ESP)

4 November 2010
20:45

Report

Partizan (Serbia)	54–67	(Israel) Maccabi Tel Aviv
Scoring by quarter: 10–23, 12–8, 15–20, 17–16
Pts: Lafayette 11; Rebs: Gist 6 Asts: Lučić 3		Pts: Pargo 17; Rebs: Perkins, Schortsanitis 8 Asts: Perkins, Eidson 4

Hala Pionir, Belgrade
Attendance: 7,570
Referees: Juan Carlos Artega (ESP), Roberto Chiari (ITA), Panagiotis Anastopoulos (GRE)

=== Game 4 ===
10 November 2010
19:45

Report

Asseco Prokom (Poland)	62–69	(Serbia) Partizan
Scoring by quarter: 18–20, 18–19, 15–13, 11–17
Pts: Brown 16; Rebs: Jagla 6 Asts: Ewing 3		Pts: Gist 16; Rebs: Three players 6 Asts: Lafayette 6

Gdynia Sports Arena, Gdynia
Attendance: 4,654
Referees: Luigi Lamonica [ITA], Vicente Bulto [ESP], Regis Bardera [FRA]

10 November 2010
20:30

Report

Caja Laboral (Spain)	88–92	(Lithuania) Žalgiris
Scoring by quarter: 22–24, 19−19, 22−21, 25−28
Pts: Rančík 24; Rebs: Teletović 4 Asts: Logan 5		Pts: Begić 18; Rebs: Jankūnas 13; Asts: Pocius 4

Fernando Buesa Arena, Vitoria-Gasteiz
Attendance: 9,600
Referees: Grzegorz Ziemlicki [POL], Paolo Taurino [ITA], Sasa Maricic [SRB]

11 November 2010
18:00

Report

Khimki (Russia)	76–78	(Israel) Maccabi Tel Aviv
Scoring by quarter: 10–19, 21–23, 27–14, 18–22
Pts: Lončar 15; Rebs: Lončar 8 Asts: Planinić 6		Pts: Eidson, Schortsanitis 16; Rebs: Schortsanitis 7 Asts: Pargo 6

Basketball Center of Moscow Region, Moscow
Attendance: 4,200
Referees: Carl Jungebrand [FIN], Matej Boltauzer [SLO], Zdravko Rutesic [MNE]

=== Game 5 ===
17 November 2010
19:45

Report

Partizan (Serbia)	74–71	(Spain) Caja Laboral
Scoring by quarter: 18–25, 24–13, 14–18, 18–15
Pts: Gist 14; Rebs: Gist 11; Asts: Lafayette, Kecman 4		Pts: Barać 17; Rebs: Barać 6 Asts: Huertas, Logan 5

Hala Pionir, Belgrade
Attendance: 7,620
Referees: Volodymr Drabikovsky [UKR], Fernando Rocha [POR], Borys Ryzhnyk [UKR]

18 November 2010
18:45

Report

Žalgiris (Lithuania)	73–65	(Russia) Khimki
Scoring by quarter: 22–19, 16–14, 16–21, 19–11
Pts: Šalenga 11; Rebs: Jankūnas 9 Asts: Four players 3		Pts: Planinić 14; Rebs: Fridzon, Eze 7 Asts: López 6

Kaunas Sports Hall, Kaunas
Attendance: 5,000
Referees: Juan Carlos Arteaga [ESP], Robert Lottermoser [GER], Radomir Vojinovic [MNE]

18 November 2010
20:00

Report

Maccabi Tel Aviv (Israel)	99–58	(Poland) Asseco Prokom
Scoring by quarter: 29–19, 19–12, 22–16, 29–11
Pts: Eidson 20; Rebs: Eliyahu 9 Asts: Pargo 6		Pts: Giddens, Ewing 14; Rebs: Jagla 7 Asts: Giddens, Brown 3

Yad Eliyahu Arena, Tel Aviv
Attendance: 11,000
Referees: Sasa Pukl (SLO), Sinisa Herceg (CRO), Sergiy Zashchuck (UKR)

=== Game 6 ===
24 November 2010
19:45

Report

Asseco Prokom (Poland)	71–67	(Russia) Khimki
Scoring by quarter: 12–12, 20–24, 16–12, 23–19
Pts: Varda 14; Rebs: Jagla 6 Asts: Videnov 5		Pts: Langford 17; Rebs: Panin, Monia 5 Asts: López 6

Gdynia Sports Arena, Gdynia
Attendance: 4,024
Referees: Juan Carlos Garcia Gonzalez [ESP], Sreten Radovic [CRO], Renaud Geller [BEL]

25 November 2010
20:45

Report

Partizan (Serbia)	68–62	(Lithuania) Žalgiris
Scoring by quarter: 23–14, 21–15, 10–14, 14–19
Pts: Milosavljević 19; Rebs: Gist 8 Asts: Božić, Gist 4		Pts: Begić 19; Rebs: Jankūnas 11; Asts: Delininkaitis 4

Hala Pionir, Belgrade
Attendance: 7,800
Referees: Carl Jungebrand (FIN), Elias Koromilas (GRE), Miguel Angel Perez Niz (ESP)

25 November 2010
20:45

Report

Maccabi Tel Aviv (Israel)	81–70	(Spain) Caja Laboral
Scoring by quarter: 21–15, 17–17, 17–19, 26–19
Pts: Eliyahu 18; Rebs: Perkins 7 Asts: Eidson 7		Pts: San Emeterio 21; Rebs: Barać 13; Asts: Huertas 5

Yad Eliyahu Arena, Tel Aviv
Attendance: 11,500
Referees: Tolga Sahin (ITA), Christos Christodoulou (GRE), Damir Javor (SLO)

=== Game 7 ===
1 December 2010
16:15

Report

Khimki (Russia)	92–65	(Serbia) Partizan
Scoring by quarter: 26–13, 24–24, 19–14, 23–14
Pts: Langford 22; Rebs: Langford 6 Asts: Langford, Planinić 3		Pts: Gist 18; Rebs: Gist 5 Asts: Milosavljević 2

Basketball Center of Moscow Region, Moscow
Attendance: 3,000
Referees: Jose Ramon Garcia Ortiz [ESP], Spiros Gkontas [GRE], Olegs Latisevs [LAT]

1 December 2010
20:30

Report

Caja Laboral (Spain)	75–81	(Poland) Asseco Prokom
Scoring by quarter: 24–20, 15–14, 17–21, 19–26
Pts: Barać 25; Rebs: Ribas 6 Asts: Huertas 8		Pts: Varda 16; Rebs: Giddens, Jagla 6 Asts: Ewing 5

Fernando Buesa Arena, Vitoria-Gasteiz
Attendance: 9,000
Referees: Zoran Sutulovic [MNE], Robert Lottermoser [GER], Panagiotis Anastopoulos [GRE]

2 December 2010
18:45

Report

Žalgiris (Lithuania)	68–71	(Israel) Maccabi Tel Aviv
Scoring by quarter: 21–18, 13–17, 22–18, 12–18
Pts: four players 10; Rebs: Pocius 4 Asts: Pocius 4		Pts: Schortsanitis 22; Rebs: Perkins 7 Asts: Eidson 4

Kaunas Sports Hall, Kaunas
Attendance: 5,000
Referees: Dani Hierrezuelo (ESP), Borys Tyzhyk (UKR), Murat Biricik (TUR)

=== Game 8 ===
9 December 2010
20:00

Report

Maccabi Tel Aviv (Israel)	76–62	(Serbia) Partizan
Scoring by quarter: 23–11, 19–13, 18–16, 16–22
Pts: Eliyahu 16; Rebs: Eidson 9 Asts: Eidson 4		Pts: Gist 14; Rebs: Jawai 7 Asts: Jerrells 4

Yad Eliyahu Arena, Tel Aviv
Attendance: 11,500
Referees: Juan Carlos Mitjana (ESP), Sradan Dozai (CRO), Rustu Nuran (TUR)

9 December 2010
20:45

Report

Asseco Prokom (Poland)	69–72	(Lithuania) Žalgiris
Scoring by quarter: 13–20, 21–13, 15–16, 20–23
Pts: Varda 25; Rebs: Varda 8 Asts: Ewing 9		Pts: Pocius, Watson 16; Rebs: Three players 5 Asts: Pocius 4

Gdynia Sports Arena, Gdynia
Attendance: 4,059
Referees: Jose Ramon Garcia Ortiz [ESP], Matej Boltauzer [SLO], Sergiy Chebyshev [UKR]

9 December 2010
20:45

Report

Caja Laboral (Spain)	89–81	(Russia) Khimki
Scoring by quarter: 27–20, 20–17, 25–18, 17–26
Pts: Teletović 23; Rebs: San Emeterio 7 Asts: Logan 4		Pts: Langford 19; Rebs: Three players 6 Asts: López 3

Fernando Buesa Arena, Vitoria-Gasteiz
Attendance: 9,650
Referees: Luigi Lamonica [ITA], Milivoje Jovcic [SRB], Nicola Maestre [FRA]

=== Game 9 ===
15 December 2010
18:45

Report

Žalgiris (Lithuania)	89–95 (OT)	(Spain) Caja Laboral
Scoring by quarter: 16–27, 17–25, 27–18, 20–10, Overtime: 9–15
Pts: Jankūnas 17; Rebs: Watson 5 Asts: Kalnietis 5		Pts: Teletović 32; Rebs: Teletović 8 Asts: Huertas 13

Kaunas Sports Hall, Kaunas
Attendance: 5,000
Referees: Guerrino Cerebuch [ITA], Sreten Radovic [CRO], Olegs Latisevs [LAT]

15 December 2010
20:45

Report

Partizan (Serbia)	61–59	(Poland) Asseco Prokom
Scoring by quarter: 15–8, 12–18, 12–15, 22–18
Pts: Katić 14; Rebs: Gist, Katić 7 Asts: Jerrells 4		Pts: Ewing, Varda 15; Rebs: Jagla 7 Asts: Ewing 5

Hala Pionir, Belgrade
Attendance: 7,800
Referees: Fabio Facchini [ITA], Paolo Taurino [ITA], Oliver Krause [GER]

16 December 2010
20:00

Report

Maccabi Tel Aviv (Israel)	80–76	(Russia) Khimki
Scoring by quarter: 18–15, 12–22, 29–18, 21–21
Pts: Pargo 18; Rebs: Blu 6 Asts: Pargo, Eidson 4		Pts: Langford 20; Rebs: Planinić 8 Asts: Planinić 4

Yad Eliyahu Arena, Tel Aviv
Attendance: 11,500
Referees: Juan Carlos Arteaga [ESP], Recep Ankarali [TUR], Milija Vojinovic [SRB]

=== Game 10 ===
23 December 2010
20:45

Report

Caja Laboral (Spain)	87–71	(Serbia) Partizan
Scoring by quarter: 21–16, 20–14, 28–19, 18–22
Pts: Teletović 17; Rebs: Oleson 7 Asts: Huertas 5		Pts: Veselý 17; Rebs: Gist 10; Asts: Jerrells, Gist 3

Fernando Buesa Arena, Vitoria-Gasteiz
Attendance: 9,500
Referees: Recep Ankarali (TUR), Eddie Viator (FRA), Damir Javor (SLO)

23 December 2010
19:00

Report

Asseco Prokom (Poland)	72–83	(Israel) Maccabi Tel Aviv
Scoring by quarter: 11–25, 18–27, 28–15, 15–16
Pts: Videnov 20; Rebs: Jagla, Varda 9 Asts: Ewing, Videnov 3		Pts: Schortsanitis 23; Rebs: Schortsanitis 7 Asts: Eidson 6

Gdynia Sports Arena, Gdynia
Attendance: 4,096
Referees: Volodymr Drabikovsky (UKR), Sinisa Herceg (CRO), Radomir Vojinovic (MNE)

23 December 2010
19:00

Report

Khimki (Russia)	93–89 (OT)	(Lithuania) Žalgiris
Scoring by quarter: 22–23, 20–25, 19–15, 20–18, Overtime: 12–8
Pts: Langford 35; Rebs: Lončar 9 Asts: Langford, Planinić 4		Pts: Kalnietis 24; Rebs: Jankūnas 11; Asts: three players 3

Basketball Center of Moscow Region, Moscow
Attendance: 1,800
Referees: Christos Christodoulou (GRE), Sradan Dozai (CRO), Tolga Sahin (ITA)
