= 2009–10 Euroleague Regular Season Group A =

Standings and Results for Group A of the regular season phase of the 2009–10 Euroleague basketball tournament.

== Standings ==
Key to colors
Top four places in each group advance to Top 16
Eliminated

	Team	Pld	W	L	PF	PA	Diff	Tie-break
1.	(Spain) Regal FC Barcelona	10	10	0	833	625	+208	
2.	(Italy) Montepaschi Siena	10	8	2	830	689	+141	
3.	(Lithuania) Žalgiris Kaunas	10	3	7	673	739	−66	3–3 +6
4.	(Croatia) Cibona Zagreb	10	3	7	637	742	−105	3–3 +2
5.	(France) ASVEL Villeurbanne	10	3	7	680	749	−69	3–3 −3
6.	(Turkey) Fenerbahçe Ülker	10	3	7	690	799	−109	3–3 −5

== Fixtures and results ==
All times given below are in Central European Time.

Unless otherwise indicated, all attendance totals are from the corresponding match report posted on the official Euroleague site and included with each game summary.

=== Game 1 ===
21 October 2009
18:30

Report

Cibona Zagreb (Croatia)	40–85	(Italy) Montepaschi Siena
Scoring by quarter: 13-21, 11-14, 8-32, 8-18
Pts: Tomas 12; Rebs: Tomas 9 Asts: Gordon 2		Pts: Lavrinovič 26; Rebs: Lavrinovič 8 Asts: McIntyre 11

Dražen Petrović Basketball Hall
Attendance: 4,200
Referees: Romualdas Brazauskas (LTU), Borys Ryzhyk (UKR), Juan Carlos García González (ESP)

21 October 2009
18:45

Report

Žalgiris Kaunas (Lithuania)	71–52	(France) ASVEL Villeurbanne
Scoring by quarter: 20-15, 20-12, 13-12, 18-13
Pts: Kalnietis 17; Rebs: Watson 14; Asts: Pocius, Watson 3		Pts: Borchardt 20; Rebs: Dixon 9 Asts: Lukauskis 3

S. Darius and S. Girėnas Hall
Attendance: 4,500
Referees: Volodymr Drabikovsky (UKR), Roman Kolar (SLO), Apostolos Kalpakas (SWE

21 October 2009
18:45

Report

Fenerbahçe Ülker İstanbul (Turkey)	59–82	(Spain) Regal FC Barcelona
Scoring by quarter: 11-19, 10-19, 17-24, 21-20
Pts: Solomon 16; Rebs: Erden, Aşık, Preldžič 3 Asts: Giriček, Greer, Savaş 2		Pts: Mickeal 26; Rebs: Vázquez, Morris, Mickeal 7 Asts: Rubio, 9

Abdi İpekçi Arena
Attendance: 1,000
Referees: Luigi Lamonica(ITA), Milivoje Jovčić (SRB), Sergiy Zashchuck (UKR)

=== Game 2 ===
28 October 2009
20:30

Report

ASVEL Villeurbanne (France)	76–78 (OT) (OT)	(Turkey) Fenerbahçe Ülker İstanbul
Scoring by quarter: 12-12, 12-17, 22-26, 18-9, Overtime: 12-14
Pts: Traore 29; Rebs: Traore 13; Asts: Lukauskis, Dixon 5		Pts: Kinsey 21; Rebs: Aşık 10; Asts: Greer 4

Astroballe
Attendance: 5,601
Referees: Fabio Facchini (ITA), Tomas Jasevicius (LTU), Seffi Shemmesh (ISR)

29 October 2009
20:45

Report

Regal FC Barcelona (Spain)	81–59	(Croatia) Cibona Zagreb
Scoring by quarter: 16-13, 23-14, 25-14, 17-18
Pts: Navarro 20; Rebs: four players with 4 Asts: Rubio 5		Pts: Tomas 16; Rebs: Rozić 6 Asts: Gordon 4

Palau Blaugrana
Attendance: 4,539
Referees: Guerrino Cerebuch (ITA), Christos Christodoulou (GRE), David Chambon (FRA)

29 October 2009
21:00

Report

Montepaschi Siena (Italy)	84–64	(Lithuania) Žalgiris Kaunas
Scoring by quarter: 23-21, 25-9, 17-14, 19-20
Pts: Eze 16; Rebs: Sato 10; Asts: McIntyre 7		Pts: Brown 17; Rebs: Watson 6 Asts: Kalnietis 4

Palasport Mens Sana
Attendance: 4,892
Referees: Dani Hierrezuelo (ESP), Luis Lopes (POR), Elias Koromilas (GRE)

=== Game 3 ===
4 November 2009
19:00

Report

ASVEL Villeurbanne (France)	65–82	(Italy) Montepaschi Siena
Scoring by quarter: 29-10, 3-21, 16-26, 17-25
Pts: Dixon 20; Rebs: Lukauskis 6 Asts: Jeanneau 5		Pts: Sato 33; Rebs: Sato 6 Asts: McIntyre 10

Astroballe
Attendance: 5,113
Referees: Jose Martín (ESP), Matej Boltauzer (SLO), Renaud Geller (BEL)

4 November 2009
19:15

Report

Fenerbahçe Ülker İstanbul (Turkey)	67–62	(Croatia) Cibona Zagreb
Scoring by quarter: 11-18, 21-14, 17-11, 18-19
Pts: Savaş 14; Rebs: Savaş 10; Asts: Preldžič 5		Pts: Gordon 15; Rebs: Radošević 6 Asts: Gordon 6

Abdi İpekçi Arena
Attendance: 1,000
Referees: Emilio Pérez Pizarro (ESP), Vicente Bulto (ESP), Damir Javor (SLO)

5 November 2009
18:45

Report

Žalgiris Kaunas (Lithuania)	70–77	(Spain) Regal FC Barcelona
Scoring by quarter: 21-23, 17-18, 15-22, 17-14
Pts: Begić 20; Rebs: Watson 10; Asts: Kalnietis 6		Pts: Mickeal 22; Rebs: Rubio 6 Asts: Rubio 5

S. Darius and S. Girėnas Hall
Attendance: 5,000
Referees: Grzegorz Ziemblicki (POL), Gianpaolo Cicoria (ITA), Boris Shulga (UKR)

=== Game 4 ===
11 November 2009
18:30

Report

Cibona Zagreb (Croatia)	64–52	(Lithuania) Žalgiris Kaunas
Scoring by quarter: 16-16, 19-15, 12-13, 17-8
Pts: Tomas 14; Rebs: Gordon 6 Asts: Tomas 3		Pts: Begić 14; Rebs: Watson 12; Asts: Kalnietis 6

Dražen Petrović Basketball Hall
Attendance: 2,500
Referees: José Martín (ESP), Marek Ćmikiewicz (POL), Murat Biricik (TUR)

11 November 2009
19:15

Report

Fenerbahçe Ülker İstanbul (Turkey)	83–87	(Italy) Montepaschi Siena
Scoring by quarter: 30-21, 20-28, 11-16, 22-22
Pts: Kinsey 20; Rebs: Savaş 7 Asts: Savaş 5		Pts: McIntyre 25; Rebs: Eze 7 Asts: Hawkins 6

Abdi İpekçi Arena
Attendance: 1,000
Referees: Saša Pukl (SLO), Fernando Rocha (POR), Antonio Conde (ESP)

11 November 2009
20:45

Report

Regal FC Barcelona (Spain)	76–62	(France) ASVEL Villeurbanne
Scoring by quarter: 19-22, 22-17, 17-14, 18-9
Pts: Mickeal 16; Rebs: Grimau 6 Asts: Rubio 3		Pts: Traore 20; Rebs: Traore 8 Asts: Lukauskis, Dixon 4

Palau Blaugrana
Attendance: 4,021
Referees: Sreten Radović (CRO), Roberto Chiari (ITA), Marko Juras (SRB)

=== Game 5 ===
25 November 2009
18:45

Report

Žalgiris Kaunas (Lithuania)	78–84	(Turkey) Fenerbahçe Ülker İstanbul
Scoring by quarter: 24-23, 19-14, 14-22, 21-25
Pts: Pocius 19; Rebs: Watson 9 Asts: Kalnietis 6		Pts: Mršić 16; Rebs: Erden 6 Asts: Mršić, Greer 5

S. Darius and S. Girėnas Hall
Attendance: 4,315
Referees: Christos Christodoulou (GRE), Juan Carlos Garcia Gonzalez (ESP), Oscar Perea (ESP)

25 November 2009
19:00

Report

ASVEL Villeurbanne (France)	71–68	(Croatia) Cibona Zagreb
Scoring by quarter: 11-18, 15-15, 17-25, 28-10
Pts: Dixon 17; Rebs: Fofana 10; Asts: Dixon 8		Pts: Rozić, Tomas 15; Rebs: Gordon, Rozić 4 Asts: Gordon 6

Astroballe
Attendance: 5,385
Referees: Juan Carlos Mitjana (ESP), Gianpaola Cicoria (ITA), Elias Koromilas (GRE)

26 November 2009
20:30

Report

Montepaschi Siena (Italy)	65–84	(Spain) Regal FC Barcelona
Scoring by quarter: 18-20, 16-23, 19-18, 12-23
Pts: McIntyre, Sato 13; Rebs: Stonerook 7 Asts: Stonerook 2		Pts: N'Dong 19; Rebs: Mickeal 7 Asts: Rubio, Navarro, Lorbek 5

Palasport Mens Sana
Attendance: 5,044
Referees: Romualdas Brazauskas (LTU), Eddie Viator (FRA), Milija Vojinovic (SRB)

=== Game 6 ===
3 December 2009
20:30

Report

Montepaschi Siena (Italy)	90–64	(Croatia) Cibona Zagreb
Scoring by quarter: 18-19, 16-17, 29-17, 27-11
Pts: McIntyre, Sato 15; Rebs: Eze 8 Asts: McIntyre, Stonerook 4		Pts: Andrić 14; Rebs: Andrić 7 Asts: Gordon, Tomas 4

Palasport Mens Sana
Attendance: 4,163
Referees: Costas Mouzakis (GRE), Sergiy Chebyshev (UKR), Marko Juras (SRB)

3 December 2009
20:45

Report

Regal FC Barcelona (Spain)	89–55	(Turkey) Fenerbahçe Ülker İstanbul
Scoring by quarter: 15-6, 27-15, 25-15, 22-19
Pts: Lakovič, Vázquez 14; Rebs: Morris 7 Asts: Navarro 5		Pts: Greer 13; Rebs: Aşık 7 Asts: Başak, Aşık 2

Palau Blaugrana
Attendance: 4,227
Referees: Zoran Šutulović (MNE), Borys Ryzhyk (UKR), Olegs Latisevs (LAT)

3 December 2009
20:45

Report

ASVEL Villeurbanne (France)	77–67	(Lithuania) Žalgiris Kaunas
Scoring by quarter: 23-24, 26-20, 20-12, 8-11
Pts: Marshall 20; Rebs: Foirest, Marshall 5 Asts: Lukauskis, Jeanneau 3		Pts: Šalenga 25; Rebs: Watson 6 Asts: Kalnietis 4

Astroballe
Attendance: 5,276
Referees: Leonidas Spiridonos (GRE), Paolo Taurino (ITA), Miguel Angel Perez Niz (ESP)

=== Game 7 ===
9 December 2009
19:15

Report

Fenerbahçe Ülker İstanbul (Turkey)	61–68	(France) ASVEL Villeurbanne
Scoring by quarter: 16-14, 18-16, 13-19, 14-19
Pts: Greer, Aşık 11; Rebs: Erden, Aşık, Preldžič 7 Asts: Preldžič 4		Pts: Kangur 16; Rebs: Marshall 6 Asts: Lukauskis, Kangur, Dixon 3

Ayhan Şahenk Arena
Attendance: 800
Referees: Guerrino Cerebuch (ITA), Matej Boltauzer (SLO), Sergiy Chebyshev (UKR)

10 December 2009
18:30

Report

Cibona Zagreb (Croatia)	66–80	(Spain) Regal FC Barcelona
Scoring by quarter: 19-26, 15-19, 19-20, 13-15
Pts: Gordon 19; Rebs: Gordon 7 Asts: Tomas 6		Pts: Navarro 20; Rebs: Morris 9 Asts: Rubio, Navarro 5

Dražen Petrović Basketball Hall
Attendance: 5,200
Referees: Christos Christodoulou (GRE), Tolga Sahin(TUR), Gianluca Mattioli (ITA)

10 December 2009
18:45

Report

Žalgiris Kaunas (Lithuania)	72–83	(Italy) Montepaschi Siena
Scoring by quarter: 17-24, 15-25, 29-17, 11-17
Pts: Watson 17; Rebs: Watson 17; Asts: Kalnietis, Klimavicius, Watson 3		Pts: Hawkins 20; Rebs: Eze 7 Asts: McIntyre 9

S. Darius and S. Girėnas Hall
Attendance: 4,005
Referees: Carl Jungebrand (FIN), Emilio Pérez Pizarro (ESP), Marko Juras (SRB)

=== Game 8 ===
16 December 2009
18:30

Report

Cibona Zagreb (Croatia)	80–77	(Turkey) Fenerbahçe Ülker İstanbul
Scoring by quarter: 12-20, 20-16, 26-22, 22-19
Pts: Tomas 28; Rebs: Andrić 6 Asts: Princ, Rozić 3		Pts: Kinsey 21; Rebs: Erden 8 Asts: Kinsey 3

Dražen Petrović Basketball Hall
Attendance: 3,500
Referees: Juan Carlos Arteaga (ESP), Antonio Conde (ESP), Panagiotis Anastopoulos (GRE)

16 December 2009
20:30

Report

Montepaschi Siena (Italy)	83–74	(France) ASVEL Villeurbanne
Scoring by quarter: 15-18, 21-14, 23-24, 24-18
Pts: Lavrinovič 16; Rebs: Ress 8 Asts: McIntyre, Sato 3		Pts: Lukauskis 20; Rebs: Samnick 6 Asts: Lukauskis, Campbell 2

Palasport Mens Sana
Attendance: 3,782
Referees: Sradan Dozai (CRO), Saša Maričić (SRB), Oskars Lucis (LAT)

17 December 2009
20:45

Report

Regal FC Barcelona (Spain)	89–55	(Lithuania) Žalgiris Kaunas
Pts: Mickeal 14; Rebs: Lorbek 7 Asts: Sada 4		Pts: Watson 17; Rebs: Watson 14; Asts: six players with 1

Palau Blaugrana
Attendance: 3,522
Referees: Shmuel Bachar (ISR), Costas Mouzakis (GRE), Siniša Herceg (CRO)

=== Game 9 ===
6 January 2010
18:30

Report

Montepaschi Siena (Italy)	101–58	(Turkey) Fenerbahçe Ülker İstanbul
Scoring by quarter: 19-14, 31-11, 28-14, 23-19
Pts: Lavrinovič 20; Rebs: Lavrinovič 6 Asts: Hawkins 5		Pts: Greer 18; Rebs: Savaş 5 Asts: Preldžič 3

Palasport Mens Sana
Attendance: 4,077
Referees: Grzegorz Ziemblicki(POL), Ilija Belošević (SRB), Eddie Viator (FRA)

7 January 2010
18:45

Report

Žalgiris Kaunas (Lithuania)	68–61	(Croatia) Cibona Zagreb
Scoring by quarter: 24-10, 15-13, 15-17, 14-21
Pts: Brown 20; Rebs: Klimavičius, Watson 8 Asts: Brown, Šalenga 4		Pts: Tomas 18; Rebs: Radosevic 5 Asts: Bagarić, Rozić 2

S. Darius and S. Girėnas Hall
Attendance: 5,000
Referees: Guerrino Cerebuch (ITA), Borys Ryzhyk (UKR), Sergiy Zashchuck (UKR)

7 January 2010
20:30

Report

ASVEL Villeurbanne (France)	64–90	(Spain) Regal FC Barcelona
Scoring by quarter: 15-22, 19-23, 20-20, 10-25
Pts: Traore 19; Rebs: Samnick 8 Asts: Dixon 4		Pts: Navarro 15; Rebs: Vázquez 7 Asts: Rubio 7

Astroballe
Attendance: 5,602
Referees: Dubravko Muhvić (CRO), Recep Ankarali (TUR), Carmelo Paternico (ITA)

=== Game 10 ===
14 January 2010
20:00

Report

Cibona Zagreb (Croatia)	73–71	(France) ASVEL Villeurbanne
Scoring by quarter: 26-18, 20-18, 15-17, 12-18
Pts: Tomas 24; Rebs: Radoševič 6 Asts: Gordon 5		Pts: Traore 16; Rebs: Traore 8 Asts: Lukauskis, Dixon 3

Dražen Petrović Basketball Hall
Attendance: 4,500
Referees: Jose Ramon Garcia Ortiz (ESP), Leonidas Spiridonos (GRE), Emilio Perez Pizarro (ESP)

14 January 2010
20:00

Report

Regal FC Barcelona (Spain)	85–70	(Italy) Montepaschi Siena
Scoring by quarter: 22-15, 18-20, 20-14, 25-21
Pts: Rubio 14; Rebs: Mickeal 9 Asts: Rubio 10		Pts: Hawkins 19; Rebs: Lavrinovič 8 Asts: McIntyre, Zisis 3

Palau Blaugrana
Attendance: 6,123
Referees: Carl Jungebrand (FIN), Fernando Rocha (POR), Marek Ćmikiewicz (POL)

14 January 2010
20:00

Report

Fenerbahçe Ülker İstanbul (Turkey)	68–76	(Lithuania) Žalgiris Kaunas
Scoring by quarter: 19-23, 18-20, 14-25, 17-8
Pts: Ukic 20; Rebs: Erden 10; Asts: Ukic 4		Pts: Pocius 18; Rebs: Brown 5 Asts: Pocius, Brown 4

Abdi İpekçi Arena
Attendance: 3,400
Referees: Fabio Facchini (ITA), Sreten Radovic (CRO), Luis Lopes (POR)
