= 2009–10 Euroleague Top 16 Group G =

Standings and Results for Group G of the Top 16 phase of the 2009–10 Euroleague basketball tournament.

== Standings ==
Key to colors
| Top two places in each group advance to Quarterfinals |
| Eliminated |

| | Team | Pld | W | L | PF | PA | Diff | Tie-break |
|---|---|---|---|---|---|---|---|---|
| 1. | (Russia) CSKA Moscow | 6 | 5 | 1 | 494 | 448 | +46 | |
| 2. | (Poland) Asseco Prokom Gdynia | 6 | 3 | 3 | 471 | 455 | +16 | |
| 3. | (Spain) Unicaja Málaga | 6 | 2 | 4 | 450 | 452 | −2 | 1–1, +13 |
| 4. | (Lithuania) Žalgiris Kaunas | 6 | 2 | 4 | 454 | 514 | −60 | 1–1, –13 |

== Fixtures and results ==
All times given below are in Central European Time.

Unless otherwise indicated, all attendance totals are from the corresponding match report posted on the official Euroleague site and included with each game summary.

=== Game 1 ===
27 January 2010
18:15

Report

| CSKA Moscow (Russia) | 86–78 | (Spain) Unicaja Málaga |
Scoring by quarter: 20-15, 22-23, 23-19, 21-21
| Pts: Šiškauskas 23; Rebs: Khryapa 13; Asts: Khryapa 6 | | Pts: Dixon 17; Rebs: Archibald, Printezis, Freeland 5 Asts: Cook, Welsch 3 |

CSKA Universal Sports Hall
Attendance: 4,500
Referees: Lazaros Voreadis (GRE), Saša Pukl (SLO), Elias Koromilas (GRE)

28 January 2010
20:00

Report

| Asseco Prokom Gdynia (Poland) | 89–65 | (Lithuania) Žalgiris Kaunas |
Scoring by quarter: 25-18, 20-18, 22-16, 22-13
| Pts: Logan 20; Rebs: Hrycaniuk 12; Asts: Logan 8 | | Pts: Šalenga 15; Rebs: Šalenga 8 Asts: Ćapin 6 |

Gdynia Sports Arena
Attendance: 4,871
Referees: Juan Carlos Mitjana (ESP), Antonio Conde (ESP), Damir Javor (SLO)

=== Game 2 ===
3 February 2010
18:45

Report

| Žalgiris Kaunas (Lithuania) | 68–83 | (Russia) CSKA Moscow |
Scoring by quarter: 26-17, 19-18, 11-22, 12-26
| Pts: Klimavičius 12; Rebs: Ćapin, Klimavičius, Begić 4 Asts: Klimavičius, Šalenga 2 | | Pts: Langdon 17; Rebs: Khryapa 6 Asts: Khryapa 4 |

Kaunas Sports Hall
Attendance: 5,000
Referees: José Martín (ESP), José Ramón García Ortiz (ESP), Eddie Viator (FRA)

3 February 2010
20:45

Report

| Unicaja Málaga (Spain) | 50–70 | (Poland) Asseco Prokom Gdynia |
Scoring by quarter: 13-17, 20-20, 7-12, 10-21
| Pts: Rodríguez 13; Rebs: Archibald 10; Asts: Cook 3 | | Pts: Woods 17; Rebs: Hrycaniuk 10; Asts: Ewing 8 |

Jose Maria Martin Carpena Arena
Attendance: 8,650
Referees: Dubravko Muhvić (CRO), Zoran Šutulović (MNE), Panagiotis Anastopoulos (GRE)

=== Game 3 ===
10 February 2010
18:15

Report

| CSKA Moscow (Russia) | 84–73 | (Poland) Asseco Prokom Gdynia |
Scoring by quarter: 22-21, 18-15, 24-21, 20-16
| Pts: Kaun 18; Rebs: Kaun 10; Asts: Šiškauskas 6 | | Pts: Woods 16; Rebs: Logan 6 Asts: Woods 6 |

CSKA Universal Sports Hall
Attendance: 4,700
Referees: Volodymr Drabikovsky (UKR), Sradan Dozai (CRO), Sreten Radović (CRO)

10 February 2010
20:45

Report

| Unicaja Málaga (Spain) | 86–68 | (Lithuania) Žalgiris Kaunas |
Scoring by quarter: 21-6, 19-23, 24-18, 22-21
| Pts: Dixon 16; Rebs: Archibald 8 Asts: Cook 7 | | Pts: Brown, Pocius 11; Rebs: Klimavičius 8 Asts: Kalnietis 7 |

Jose Maria Martin Carpena Arena
Attendance: 8,000
Referees: Ilija Belošević (SRB), Roberto Chiari (ITA), Carmelo Paternico (ITA)

=== Game 4 ===
24 February 2010
19:45

Report

| Asseco Prokom Gdynia (Poland) | 88–81 | (Russia) CSKA Moscow |
Scoring by quarter: 20-25, 28-18, 16-26, 24-12
| Pts: Logan 22; Rebs: Jagla 7 Asts: Logan, Woods, Ewing 4 | | Pts: Langdon 20; Rebs: Langdon 6 Asts: Šiškauskas, Khryapa 5 |

Gdynia Sports Arena
Attendance: 4,910
Referees: Fabio Facchini (ITA), Spiros Gkontas (GRE), Milija Vojinović (SRB)

25 February 2010
18:45

Report

| Žalgiris Kaunas (Lithuania) | 89–84 | (Spain) Unicaja Málaga |
Scoring by quarter: 26–19, 24–22, 18–24, 21–19
| Pts: Pocius, Šalenga 17; Rebs: Watson 8 Asts: Ćapin 6 | | Pts: Archibald 17; Rebs: Freeland 8 Asts: Cook, Rodríguez 6 |

Kaunas Sports Hall
Attendance: 4,950
Referees: Costas Mouzakis (GRE), Recep Ankaralı (TUR), Milivoje Jovčić (SRB)

=== Game 5 ===
3 March 2010
18:45

Report

| Žalgiris Kaunas (Lithuania) | 93–88 | (Poland) Asseco Prokom Gdynia |
Scoring by quarter: 22-18, 28-16, 23-29, 20-25
| Pts: Brown 23; Rebs: Watson 11; Asts: Kalnietis 4 | | Pts: Logan 22; Rebs: Varda, Burrell 7 Asts: Ewing 5 |

Kaunas Sports Hall
Attendance: 4,651
Referees: Lazaros Voreadis (GRE), Robert Lottermoser (GER), Elias Koromilas (GRE)

3 March 2010
20:45

Report

| Unicaja Málaga (Spain) | 70–76 | (Russia) CSKA Moscow |
Scoring by quarter: 10-24, 8-9, 22-16, 30-27
| Pts: Cook 17; Rebs: Welsch, Jiménez, Freeland 5 Asts: Cook 8 | | Pts: Šiškauskas 16; Rebs: Kaun 8 Asts: Khryapa 8 |

Jose Maria Martin Carpena Arena
Attendance: 6,900
Referees: Carl Jungebrand (FIN), Fernando Rocha (POR), David Chambon (FRA)

=== Game 6 ===
10 March 2010
18:15

Report

| CSKA Moscow (Russia) | 84–71 | (Lithuania) Žalgiris Kaunas |
Scoring by quarter: 15–14, 23–17, 29–20, 17–20
| Pts: Mensah-Bonsu 19; Rebs: Mensah-Bonsu 8 Asts: Holden 3 | | Pts: Kalnietis 22; Rebs: Begić, Klimavičius 7 Asts: Pocius 5 |

CSKA Universal Sports Hall
Attendance: 3,600
Referees: Dubravko Muhvić (CRO), Dani Hierrezuelo (ESP), Sergiy Chebyshev (UKR)

11 March 2010
19:15

Report

| Asseco Prokom Gdynia (Poland) | 63–82 | (Spain) Unicaja Málaga |
Scoring by quarter: 21–20, 18–19, 16–23, 8–20
| Pts: Varda 16; Rebs: Varda 9 Asts: Logan 6 | | Pts: Freeland 17; Rebs: Welsch 6 Asts: Cook 8 |

Gdynia Sports Arena
Attendance: 4,850
Referees: Marek Cmikiewicz (POL), Murat Biricik (TUR), Matej Boltauzer (SLO)
