= 2011–12 Baltic Basketball League =

Baltic Basketball League 2011–12 season was a basketball competition among Baltic states basketball clubs. The season started on 30 September 2011.

== Teams ==
Elite Division

Country (League)	Teams	Teams (ranking in 2010–11 national championship)							
Lithuania (LKL)	8	BC Žalgiris^ (1)	BC Lietuvos rytas^ (2)	BC Rūdupis (SF)	BC Juventus† (SF)	BC Šiauliai (QF)	BC Kėdainiai Triobet (9)	BC Baltai† (10)	BC Pieno žvaigždės (NKL 1)
Latvia (LBL)	3	BC VEF Rīga^ (1)	BK Ventspils (2)	BK Liepājas Lauvas (SF)					
Estonia (KML)	2	BC Kalev/Cramo (1)	University of Tartu (2)						
Russia (PBL)	1	BC Triumph Lyubertsy (10)							

† Promoted from the 2010–11 Challenge Cup
^ Qualified directly to playoffs

Challenge Cup

Country (League)	Teams	Teams (ranking in 2010–11 national championship)			
Lithuania (LKL)	4	BC Neptūnas (QF)	BC Lietkabelis (QF)	BC Sakalai (11)	BC Naglis (12)
Latvia (LBL)	3	BK Valmiera (QF)	BK Jelgava (QF)	BA Turība (QF)	
Estonia (KML)	3	TTÜ KK (SF)	BC Rakvere Tarvas (SF)	Piimameister Otto/Rapla (QF)	
Kazakhstan (D1)	1	Barsy Atyrau (1)			

== Elite Division ==
=== Regular season ===
	Team	Pts	Pld	W	L	PF	PA	Diff	Qualification
1	(Lithuania) Šiauliai	36	20	16	4	1762	1646	+116	Qualified for the Playoffs
2	(Russia) Triumph Lyubertsy	36	20	16	4	1667	1457	+210	Qualified for the Playoffs
3	(Latvia) Ventspils	32	20	12	8	1575	1482	+93	Qualified for the Playoffs
4	(Estonia) Kalev/Cramo	32	20	12	8	1502	1451	+51	Qualified for the Playoffs
5	(Lithuania) Rūdupis	32	20	12	8	1673	1650	+23	Qualified for the Playoffs
6	(Lithuania) Pieno žvaigždės	30	20	10	10	1446	1385	+61	
7	(Lithuania) Kėdainiai/Triobet	30	20	10	10	1533	1563	−10	
8	(Lithuania) Juventus	29	20	9	11	1490	1562	−72	
9	(Estonia) University of Tartu	26	20	6	14	1584	1688	−104	
10	(Lithuania) KK Baltai	24	20	4	16	1462	1592	−130	
11	(Latvia) Liepājas Lauvas	23	20	3	17	1435	1653	−218	

=== Play-offs ===
Quarter Finals
(Lithuania)	Žalgiris	2
(Lithuania)	Rūdupis	1
(Lithuania)	Šiauliai	2
(Russia)	Triumph Lyubertsy	1
(Latvia)	VEF Riga	2
(Estonia)	Kalev/Cramo	1
(Lithuania)	Lietuvos Rytas	2
(Latvia)	Ventspils	0

Semifinals
(Lithuania)	Žalgiris	117
(Lithuania)	Šiauliai	64
(Latvia)	VEF Riga	61
(Lithuania)	Lietuvos Rytas	89

Finals
(Lithuania)	Žalgiris	74
(Lithuania)	Lietuvos Rytas	70

==== Quarterfinals ====
Žalgiris vs. Rūdupis

21 March
18:30

Report

Rūdupis (Lithuania)	97–85	(Lithuania) Žalgiris
Scoring by quarter: 21–22, 30–16, 24–28, 22–19
Pts: Kadžiulis 22; Rebs: Juškevičius, Orelik 5 Asts: Juškevičius 5		Pts: Jankūnas 17; Rebs: Jankūnas 7 Asts: Kalnietis 3

Prienų Arena, Prienai
Attendance: 1,350
Referees: Mindaugas Vecerskis, Gintaras Vitkauskas, Ramunas Zukauskas

23 March
19:15

Report

Žalgiris (Lithuania)	85–67	(Lithuania) Rūdupis
Scoring by quarter: 18–25, 22–5, 21–9, 24–28
Pts: Kalnietis, Kuzminskas 12; Rebs: Javtokas 9 Asts: Kalnietis 6		Pts: Labuckas 17; Rebs: Labuckas, Buterlevičius 5 Asts: Labuckas, Ivanauskas 3

Žalgiris Arena, Kaunas
Attendance: 7,840
Referees: Antanas Ramanauskas, Saulius Paskevicius, Linas Masiulis

28 March
19:15

Report

Žalgiris (Lithuania)	90–73	(Lithuania) Rūdupis
Scoring by quarter: 26–18, 21–18, 18–13, 25–24
Pts: Delininkaitis 18; Rebs: Lipkevičius 8 Asts: Kalnietis 5		Pts: Dabkus 17; Rebs: Dabkus 6 Asts: Juškevičius 4

Žalgiris Arena, Kaunas
Attendance: 5,841
Referees: Mindaugas Vecerskis, Andrius Maleckas, Ignas Davainis

Šiauliai vs. Triumph Lyubertsy

10 March
18:00

Report

Triumph Lyubertsy (Russia)	84–76	(Lithuania) Šiauliai
Scoring by quarter: 26–21, 22–16, 18–18, 18–21
Pts: Karasev 22; Rebs: Jefferson 12; Asts: McKee 5		Pts: Ruzgas 22; Rebs: Vasylius 13; Asts: Long 3

SH Triumph, Lyubertsy
Attendance: 1030
Referees: Oskars Lucis, Ingus Baumanis, Andris Aunkrogers

6 April
18:00

Canceled

Šiauliai (Lithuania)	vs.	(Russia) Triumph Lyubertsy

Šiauliai Arena, Šiauliai

7 April
17:00

Canceled

Šiauliai (Lithuania)	vs.	(Russia) Triumph Lyubertsy
Triumph withdrew from competition

Šiauliai Arena, Šiauliai

VEF Riga vs. Kalev/Cramo

22 March
19:00

Report

VEF Riga (Latvia)	64–56	(Estonia) Kalev/Cramo
Scoring by quarter: 20–13, 17–15, 12–8, 15–20
Pts: Kavaliauskas 17; Rebs: Millage 11; Asts: Bertāns 4		Pts: Sokk 13; Rebs: Šķēle, Fall 4 Asts: Sokk, Arbet, Šķēle 3

Saldus Sports Center, Riga
Attendance: 800
Referees: Jurgis Laurinavicius, Antanas Ramanauskas, Vilius Maciulaitis

24 March
17:00

Report

Kalev/Cramo (Estonia)	79–76 (OT)	(Latvia) VEF Riga
Scoring by quarter: 22–25, 22–13, 13–15, 13–17, Overtime: 9–6
Pts: Arbet 17; Rebs: Dorbek 8 Asts: Sokk 4		Pts: Millage 16; Rebs: Jahovičs 11; Asts: Millage 4

Saku Suurhall, Tallinn
Attendance: 1,800
Referees: Mindaugas Vecerskis, Gintaras Vitkauskas, Martynas Gudas

31 March
16:00

Report

VEF Riga (Latvia)	84–78	(Estonia) Kalev/Cramo
Scoring by quarter: 13–22, 18–14, 26–23, 27–19
Pts: Janičenoks 22; Rebs: Bērziņš 7 Asts: Millage 6		Pts: Arbet 16; Rebs: Fall 10; Asts: Ulyanko, Sokk 6

Arena Riga, Riga
Attendance: 1,300
Referees: Jurgis Laurinavicius, Antanas Ramanauskas, Vilius Maciulaitis

Lietuvos Rytas vs. Ventspils

23 March
19:00

Report

Lietuvos rytas (Lithuania)	99–79	(Latvia) Ventspils
Scoring by quarter: 20–18, 28–17, 33–25, 18–19
Pts: Seibutis 19; Rebs: Valančiūnas 10; Asts: Valančiūnas, Rašić, Jomantas 3		Pts: Meiers 16; Rebs: Meiers 4 Asts: Young, Gray, Abernethy 4

Lietuvos rytas Arena, Vilnius
Attendance: 1,050
Referees: Tanel Suslov, Mart Uuehendrik, Rain Peerandi

2 April
19:00

Report

Ventspils (Latvia)	63–73	(Lithuania) Lietuvos rytas
Scoring by quarter: 5–18, 15–16, 22–22, 21–17
Pts: Gray 14; Rebs: Abernethy 8 Asts: Abernethy 5		Pts: Katelynas, Valančiūnas 14; Rebs: Valančiūnas 8 Asts: Babrauskas 3

Ventspils Olimpiskais Stadions, Ventspils
Attendance: 1,500
Referees: Aare Halliko, Andres Tobi, Timo Suslov

==== Semifinals ====
28 April
17:30

Report

Žalgiris (Lithuania)	117–64	(Lithuania) Šiauliai
Scoring by quarter: 31–12, 31–25, 31–13, 24–12
Pts: Jankūnas 21; Rebs: Klimavičius 10; Asts: Popović, Kalnietis 6		Pts: Broadus 14; Rebs: Jucikas 5 Asts: Prekevičius 3

Šiauliai Arena, Šiauliai
Attendance: 3300
Referees: Mindaugas Vecerskis, Martynas Gudas, Tanel Suslov

28 April
20:00

Report

VEF Riga (Latvia)	61–89	(Lithuania) Lietuvos rytas
Scoring by quarter: 19–27, 12–20, 15–24, 19–18
Pts: Bērziņš 11; Rebs: Kavaliauskas 7 Asts: Millage 6		Pts: Redikas 16; Rebs: Dilys 6 Asts: Rice 5

Šiauliai Arena, Šiauliai
Attendance: 2900
Referees: Andres Tobi, Juris Kokainis, Antanas Ramanauskas

==== Third place match ====
29 April
15:00

Report

Šiauliai (Lithuania)	75–92	(Latvia) VEF Riga
Scoring by quarter: 24–20, 16–30, 13–18, 22–24
Pts: Gvezdauskas 20; Rebs: Long 7 Asts: Gvezdauskas, Broadus, Long 3		Pts: Kavaliauskas 24; Rebs: Millage 6 Asts: Bērziņš, Bailey, Millage 4

Šiauliai Arena, Šiauliai
Attendance: 3000
Referees: Jurgis Laurinavicius, Ingus Baumanis, Tanel Suslov

==== Final ====
29 April
18:00

Report

Žalgiris (Lithuania)	74–70	(Lithuania) Lietuvos rytas
Scoring by quarter: 22–26, 20–10, 17–18, 15–16
Pts: Kalnietis 19; Rebs: Jankūnas 5 Asts: Popović 6		Pts: Rice 20; Rebs: Samardžiski 8 Asts: Redikas 3

Šiauliai Arena, Šiauliai
Attendance: 4200
Referees: Olegs Latisevs, Oskars Lucis, Andres Tobi

=== Player statistics ===
Efficiency

Pos.	Name	Team	EFF
1	(United States) Denzel Bowles	(Lithuania) Šiauliai	21.3
2	(Lithuania) Jonas Valančiūnas	(Lithuania) Lietuvos Rytas	21.0
3	(United States) David James McLure	(Lithuania) Kėdainiai Triobet	19.0
4	(Lithuania) Valdas Vasylius	(Lithuania) Šiauliai	18.6
5	(United States) Bill Amis	(Latvia) Tartu Ülikool	17.5

Points

Pos.	Name	Team	PPG
1	(United States) Denzel Bowles	(Lithuania) Šiauliai	19.3
2	(United States) Joshua Mayo	(Latvia) Liepājas Lauvas	16.2
3	(United States) Bill Amis	(Estonia) Tartu Ülikool	16.1
4	(Lithuania) Renaldas Seibutis	(Lithuania) Lietuvos Rytas	16.0
5	(Lithuania) Antanas Kavaliauskas	(Latvia) BK VEF Rīga	15.0

Rebounds

Pos.	Name	Team	RPG
1	(United States) David James McLure	(Lithuania) Kėdainiai Triobet	9.3
2	(Lithuania) Jonas Valančiūnas	(Lithuania) Lietuvos Rytas	9.0
3	(Latvia) Gatis Jahovics	(Latvia) BK VEF Rīga	8.3
4	(United States) Denzel Bowles	(Lithuania) Šiauliai	7.4
5	(United States) Lawrence Roberts	(Lithuania) Lietuvos Rytas	7.0

Assists

Pos.	Name	Team	APG
1	(Lithuania) Mantas Kalnietis	(Lithuania) Žalgiris Kaunas	4.7
2	(United States) Rashaun Broadus	(Lithuania) Šiauliai	4.6
3	(Latvia) Janis Strelnieks	(Latvia) Ventspils	4.3
4	(Lithuania) Gediminas Maceina	(Lithuania) Juventus	4.2
5	(United States) Curtis Millage	(Latvia) BK VEF Rīga	4.0

== Challenge Cup ==
=== Regular season ===
==== Group A ====
	Team	Pts	Pld	W	L	PF	PA	Diff	Qualification
1	(Estonia) BC Rakvere Tarvas	14	8	6	2	678	642	+36	Qualified for the Playoffs
2	(Lithuania) BC Naglis	13	8	5	3	612	609	+3	Qualified for the Playoffs
3	(Lithuania) KK Neptūnas	13	8	5	3	759	637	+122	Qualified for the Playoffs
4	(Kazakhstan) Barsy Atyrau	11	8	3	5	621	653	−32	Qualified for the Playoffs
5	(Latvia) BK Jelgava	9	8	1	7	614	743	−129	

==== Group B ====
	Team	Pts	Pld	W	L	PF	PA	Diff	Qualification
1	(Lithuania) BC Lietkabelis	18	10	8	2	823	733	+90	Qualified for the Playoffs
2	(Lithuania) BC Sakalai	18	10	8	2	816	650	+166	Qualified for the Playoffs
3	(Latvia) BK Valmiera	17	10	7	3	726	641	+85	Qualified for the Playoffs
4	(Estonia) TTÜ KK	13	10	3	7	710	767	−57	Qualified for the Playoffs
5	(Estonia) Piimameister Otto/Rapla	12	10	2	8	619	752	−133	
6	(Latvia) BA Turība	12	10	2	8	651	802	−151	

=== Play-offs ===
Quarter-finals
(Estonia) BC Rakvere Tarvas	90 83
(Estonia) TTÜ KK	83 62
(Lithuania) BC Sakalai	75 86
(Lithuania) KK Neptūnas	79 74
(Lithuania) BC Naglis	63 77
(Latvia) BK Valmiera	74 53
(Lithuania) BC Lietkabelis	109 90
(Kazakhstan) Barsy Atyrau	67 73

Semi-finals
(Estonia) BC Rakvere Tarvas	75 102
(Lithuania) BC Sakalai	68 91
(Lithuania) BC Naglis	62 82
(Lithuania) BC Lietkabelis	63 96

Final
(Estonia) BC Rakvere Tarvas	74 82
(Lithuania) BC Lietkabelis	89 71
Third place
(Lithuania) BC Sakalai	83 71
(Lithuania) BC Naglis	67 64

2011/2012 BBL Challenge Cup Champions

BC Lietkabelis
First Title
