= Veski =

Veski may refer to:

== People ==
- Anne Veski (born 1956), Estonian singer
- Johannes Voldemar Veski (1873–1968), Estonian linguist
- Viljar Veski (born 1986), Estonian basketball player
- Villu Veski (born 1962), Estonian saxophonist and music teacher

== Places ==
- Veski, Põlva County, village in Estonia
- Veski, Rapla County, village in Estonia
- Veski, Vladimir Oblast, village in Russia
