= First Women's League of Republika Srpska in basketball =

First Women's League of Republika Srpska
- Founded: 1992
- First season: 1992-1993
- Country: Bosnia and Herzegovina
- Number of teams: 5
- Promotion to: Basketball Championship of BiH
- Domestic cup: Republika Srpska Cup
- Current champions: ŽKK Igman Istočna Ilidža (2024–25)
- Most championships: ŽKK Mladi Krajišnik (9 titles)
- Website: ks.rs.ba
- 2024-25

The First Women's League of Republika Srpska in basketball (Serbian: Прва женска лига Републике Српске у кошарци, Prva ženska liga Republike Srpske u košarci), known as the Meridianbet Prva ženska liga RS for sponsorship reasons, is a professional women's basketball competition held in Republika Srpska, an entity of Bosnia and Herzegovina.

Before the establishment of the Republika Srpska Championship in the 1992–93 season, teams from this region competed in the Yugoslav league system. The league's first champion was ŽKK Mladi Krajišnik from Banja Luka, which won nine consecutive titles. During the 1990s, the club also competed in the Championship of SR Yugoslavia, achieving a second-place finish in the 1997–98 season.

The championship is organized by the Basketball Federation of Republika Srpska, and five clubs are competing in the 2024/25 season.

The Republika Srpska Women's First League is a lower-tier competition compared to the Bosnia and Herzegovina Women's Basketball Championship, in which teams from Republika Srpska compete alongside clubs from other parts of the country, with a total of twelve teams. Additionally, some teams from Republika Srpska also take part in the WABA League, an international women's club competition in the Balkan region.

== Competition System ==
The championship consists of two phases:

First Phase

This is the league stage of the tournament, played in a double round-robin format (each team plays one home and one away match against every other team).

Second Phase (Play-Offs)

This stage features the four highest-ranked teams from the league phase. The winner of the Play-Offs is crowned the champion of Republika Srpska and qualifies for the Bosnia and Herzegovina Championship.

== Current teams ==
The following is the list of clubs for the 2024–25 season.

Team	City
KK Budućnost BN	Bijeljina
OKK Igman	Istočna Ilidža
KK Kostajnica	Kostajnica
KK Lider	Gradiška
ŽKK Sloboda Novi Grad	Novi Grad

== Seasons ==
Season	Champion
1992-93	ŽKK Mladi Krajišnik
1993-94	ŽKK Mladi Krajišnik
1994-95	ŽKK Mladi Krajišnik
1995-96	ŽKK Mladi Krajišnik
1996-97	ŽKK Mladi Krajišnik
1997-98	ŽKK Mladi Krajišnik
1998-99	ŽKK Mladi Krajišnik
1999-00	ŽKK Mladi Kajišnik
2000-01	ŽKK Mladi Krajišnik
2001-02	
2002-03	
2003-04	
2004-05	
2005-06	
2006-07	
2007-08	
2008-09	ŽKK Igman Istočna Ilidža
2009-10	
2010-11	
2011-12	
2012-13	
2013-14	
2014-15	ŽKK Igokea
2015-16	ŽKK Kozara
2016-17	ŽKK Kozara
2017-18	ŽKK Trebinje 03
2018-19	ŽKK Orlovi 2
2019-20	ŽKK Feniks
2020-21	ŽKK Lavovi
2021-22	ŽKK Kozara
2022-23	ŽKK Igman Istočna Ilidža
2023-24	ŽKK Feniks
2024-25	ŽKK Igman Istočna Ilidža

== See also ==
- First League of Republika Srpska (basketball)
- Basketball Federation of Republika Srpska
