= Republika Srpska national basketball team =

Official basketball team of Republika Srpska, Bosnia and Herzegovina

Republic of Srpska
- FIBA ranking: N/A
- Joined FIBA: N/A
- National federation: KSRS
- Coach: (Republika Srpska) Goran Sladojević

Olympic Games
- Appearances: N/A
- Medals: N/A

FIBA World Cup
- Appearances: N/A
- Medals: N/A

Eurobasket
- Appearances: N/A
- Medals: N/A

First international
- Republika Srpska 99–84 Srpska Krajina (Republic of Serbian Krajina) (Banja Luka, 27 June 1993)

The Republika Srpska basketball team is the national basketball team of Republika Srpska, an entity part of Bosnia and Herzegovina. The team cannot play official matches in FIBA competitions. Many players represent the Bosnia and Herzegovina national basketball team instead.

== History ==
Republic of Srpska Basketball Association (Serbian: Košarkaški savez Republike Srpske - KSRS) appeared in November 1992, after Republic of Srpska had been formed. During 1993, KSRS worked on organising what is now RS Basketball Championship. After the war on the BiH territory, KSRS integrated together with KSFBiH and KSHB into BiH Basketball Association. At the national level Republic of Srpska played friendly matches within a traditional manifestation called Basketball Tournament (Košarkaški sabor) where Republic of Srpska senior team played friendly matches against Serbian national team consisting of players from Serbian Top Division. During that tournament KSRS named the best male and female basketball players of the year.

== Games played ==
Date	Competition	Location	Home team	Result	Away team
27 June 1993	Friendly	(Republika Srpska) Banja Luka	Republika Srpska	99 – 84	(Republika Srpska) Serbian Krajina

== Current status ==
During the International Sport Fair in Belgrade in November 2014, the protocole of cooperation was signed by BF Serbia and BF Republic of Srpska. In 2015 the Serbian selection is going to play against the Republic of Srpska during preparations for 2015 FIBA European championship.

== Competitive record ==
=== At Republic of Srpska Basketball Tournament ===
Republic of Srpska Basketball Tournament
Date	Place	Home team	Guest team	Results
8.01.2019.	Teslić	(Republika Srpska) Republic of Srpska	Serbia	79 : 98
27.12.2017.	Zvornik	(Republika Srpska) Republic of Srpska	Serbia	70 : 101
28.12.2016.	Visegrad	(Republika Srpska) Republic of Srpska	Serbia	73 : 82
26.12.2015.	Bijeljina	(Republika Srpska) Republic of Srpska	Serbia	99 : 108
24.12.2014.	Visagrad	(Republika Srpska) Republic of Srpska	Serbia	72 : 83
24.12.2013.	Banja Luka	(Republika Srpska) Republic of Srpska	Serbia	77 : 85
25.12.2012.	Pale	(Republika Srpska) Republic of Srpska	Serbia	108 : 114
27.12.2011.	Bijeljina	(Republika Srpska) Republic of Srpska	Serbia	96 : 95
26.12.2010.	Laktasi	(Republika Srpska) Republic of Srpska	Serbia	83 : 86
28.12.2009.	Foca	(Republika Srpska) Republic of Srpska	Serbia	70 : 77
28.12.2008.	Teslic	(Republika Srpska) Republic of Srpska	Serbia	90 : 81
2007	Bratunac	(Republika Srpska) Republic of Srpska	Serbia	98 : 96
2006	Mrkonjic Grad	(Republika Srpska) Republic of Srpska	Serbia	71 : 86
2005	Bijeljina	(Republika Srpska) Republic of Srpska	Serbia	97 : 93

== Roster ==
Team for the 2015 Kosarkaski Sabor Republike Srpske.

Republic of Srpska men's national basketball team roster
Players
Coaches

Pos.	No.	Name	Age – Date of birth	Height	Club	Ctr.
	1	Draško Knežević	–		KK Mladost Mrkonjić Grad	(Republika Srpska)
	2	Marko Rikalo	–		KK Swisslion Leotar Trebinje	(Republika Srpska)
	3	Vladimir Radovanović	–		KK Gradjanski Bijeljina	(Republika Srpska)
	4	Dejan Kokoruš	–		KK BN Basket Bijeljina	(Republika Srpska)
	5	Vladimir Aleksic	–		KK Swisslion Leotar Trebinje	(Republika Srpska)
	6	Dejan Šakotić	–		KK Swisslion Leotar Trebinje	(Republika Srpska)
	7	Stefan Glogovac	–		OKK Spars Sarejevo	(Bosnia and Herzegovina)
	8	Dragan Djuranovic	–		KK Mladost Mrkonjić Grad	(Republika Srpska)
	9	Nebojša Erkić	–		KK Gradjanski Bijeljina	(Republika Srpska)
	10	Aleksandar Radukić	–		KK Mladost Mrkonjić Grad	(Republika Srpska)
	11	Srdjan Damjanović	–		KK BN Basket	(Republika Srpska)
	12	Darko Damjanović	–		KK BN Basket	(Republika Srpska)

Head coach

- (Republika Srpska) Goran Sladojević

Assistant coach

- (Republika Srpska) Aleksandar Čikić
- (Bosnia and Herzegovina) Sabahudin Bašović

== Past rosters ==
2014 Kosarkaski Sabor Republike Srpske:

4 Srdjan Lončar, 5 Djordje Aleksić, 6 Stefan Lakić, 7 Nemanja Stanimirović, 8 Vladimir Aleksic, 9 Željko Klještan, 10 Stefan Glogovac, 11 Djordje Nikolić, 12 Nikola Djurasovic, 13 Marko Josilo, 14 Dragan Djuranovic, 15 Dušan Ognjenović, 16 Igor Josipovic, 18 Obrad Tomic (Coach: Dragojlub Vidačić)

2013 Kosarkaski Sabor Republike Srpske:

4 Filip Adamovic, 5 Drasko kneyevic, 6 Vladimir Radovanovic, 7 Aleksandar Vasilic, 8 Vladimir Aleksic, 9 Dejan Sakotic, 10 Nemanja Gordic, 11 Milan Kezic, 12 Nikola Djurasovic, 13 Marko Josilo, 14 Dragan Djuranovic, 15 Goran Kovacevic, 16 Igor Josipovic, 17 Drasko Albijanic, 18 Obrad Tomic (Coach: Goran Sladojevic)

== Youth competitions ==
=== At Tournament of Regions ===
Tournament of regions
Date	Place	Home team	Guest team	Results
29-31.5.2014.	Kragujevac	(Serbia) Vojvodina U-14	(Republika Srpska) Republic of Srpska U-14	50 : 61
29-31.5.2014.	Kragujevac	South Serbia U-14	(Republika Srpska) Republic of Srpska U-14	49 : 59
29-31.5.2014.	Kragujevac	Western Serbia U-14	(Republika Srpska) Republic of Srpska U-14	61 : 59
29-31.5.2014.	Kragujevac	(Serbia) Belgrade U-14	(Republika Srpska) Republic of Srpska U-14	41 : 45
29-31.5.2014.	Kragujevac	East Serbia U-14	(Republika Srpska) Republic of Srpska U-14	57 : 55

== See also ==
- First League of Republika Srpska
