= Basketball Federation of Republika Srpska =

Sports governing body

- Sport: Basketball
- Jurisdiction: Republika Srpska, Bosnia and Herzegovina
- Abbreviation: KSRS
- Founded: 1992; 33 years ago
- Headquarters: Banja Luka
- President: Aleksandar Đurđević
- Secretary: Dragan Ćazić
- Sponsor: Meridianbet

Official website
- ks.rs.ba

The Basketball Federation of Republika Srpska (KSRS) (Serbian: Кошаркашки савез Републике Српске, Košarkaški savez Republike Srpske) is the highest basketball organization operating in the territory of Republika Srpska, Bosnia and Herzegovina. It is one of three regional federations in the country that operate under the Basketball Federation of Bosnia and Herzegovina.

The Basketball Federation of Republika Srpska organizes club competitions, manages basketball clubs, and promotes the development of basketball in the territory of Republika Srpska. The federation cooperates with the Ministry of Family, Youth and Sports of Republika Srpska. It is a full member of the Sports Federation of Republika Srpska and maintains cooperation with the Basketball Federation of Serbia.

The First League of Republika Srpska is the highest level of club competition in the entity, organized under the auspices of the KSRS. It functions as the second tier of club competition in Bosnia and Herzegovina, below the national Basketball Championship of Bosnia and Herzegovina.

== Competitions ==
The Basketball Federation of Republika Srpska organizes the following competitions:

- Republika Srpska Cup
- Meridianbet First Men's League of Republika Srpska
- Meridiabet First Women's League of Republika Srpska
- Second Men's League of Republika Srpska (West)
- Second Men's League of Republika Srpska (Central)
- Second Men's League of Republika Srpska (East)
- Mini-League
- Regional Leagues
- Youth competitions (Juniors, Cadets, Pioneers, Junior Pioneers)

== Organization ==
The Basketball Federation of Republika Srpska is divided into four regional associations:

- Banja Luka
- Bijeljina
- Doboj
- Romanija/Herzegovina

== See also ==
- Republika Srpska national basketball team
