= Petr Samoylenko =

Russian basketball player

Personal information
- Born: February 7, 1977 (age 49) Uchkuduk, Uzbek Soviet Socialist Republic, Soviet Union
- Listed height: 1.87 m (6 ft 2 in)
- Listed weight: 86 kg (190 lb)

Career information
- Playing career: 1996–2016
- Position: Point guard

Career history
- 1996–1998: Samara
- 1998–2007: UNICS Kazan
- 2007–2008: Dynamo Moscow
- 2008–2013: UNICS Kazan
- 2014–2015: Spartak Primorye
- 2015–2016: Sakhalin

Career highlights
- EuroCup champion (2011); FIBA Europe League champion (2004); North European League champion (2003); 2× Russian Cup winner (2003, 2009)
Medals
Men's basketball
Representing Russia
FIBA EuroBasket
Gold medal – first place	2007 Spain

Petr Samoylenko (born February 7, 1977) is a retired Russian professional basketball player. At a height of 6 ft 1 3/4 in (1.87 m) tall, and a weight of 190 pounds (86 kg), he played at the point guard position. He was best known throughout his career for being a defensive specialist.

== Professional career ==
Samoylenko played professionally with Samara, UNICS Kazan, Dynamo Moscow, and Spartak Primorye.

== National team career ==
Samoylenko was a long-time member of the senior Russian national basketball team. With Russia's senior national team, he played at the following tournaments: the EuroBasket 2001, the EuroBasket 2003, the EuroBasket 2005, the EuroBasket 2007, and the 2008 Summer Olympic Games.

== Club honors ==
- North European League
  - Winner (1): 2002–03
- FIBA Europe League
  - Winner (1): 2003–04
- VTB League
  - Runner-up (2): 2009–10, 2011–12
- EuroCup
  - Winner (1): 2010–11
- Russian League
  - Runner-up (4): 2000–01, 2001–02, 2003–04, 2006–07
  - Third place (9): 1996–97, 1997–98, 1999–00, 2002–03, 2004–05, 2007–08, 2008–09, 2009–10, 2010–11
- Russian Cup
  - Winner (2): 2003, 2009
  - Runner-up (3): 2005, 2007, 2010
