= Regional Basketball League =

Regional Basketball League may refer to:

- United Basketball League, a spring semi-professional basketball league in the Southern United States
- Regional Basketball League (Lithuania)
