= Ratko Varda =

Serbian-Bosnian basketball player

Personal information
- Born: 6 May 1979 (age 47) Bosanska Gradiška, SR Bosnia and Herzegovina, SFR Yugoslavia
- Listed height: 2.13 m (7 ft 0 in)
- Listed weight: 112 kg (247 lb)

Career information
- NBA draft: 2001: undrafted
- Playing career: 1995–2017
- Position: Center
- Number: 9, 10, 12, 20, 21, 31, 42, 44, 50

Career history
- 1995–2001: Partizan
- 2001–2002: Detroit Pistons
- 2003: Union Olimpija
- 2003–2004: Apollon Patras
- 2004–2005: Beşiktaş
- 2005–2006: Kyiv
- 2006–2007: Real Madrid
- 2007–2008: ViveMenorca
- 2008: Žalgiris
- 2009: Khimki
- 2009–2011: Asseco Prokom Gdynia
- 2011: Union Olimpija
- 2011–2012: Azovmash
- 2012: Mahram Tehran
- 2012–2013: Radnički Kragujevac
- 2013–2014: Mega Vizura
- 2015: United Byblos Amchit
- 2015: Kožuv
- 2016: Sutjeska
- 2016–2017: Hekmeh
- 2017: Dynamic

Career highlights
- 2× YUBA League champion (1996–1997); 2× Yugoslav Cup winner (1999–2000); Liga ACB champion (2007); ULEB Cup champion (2007); 2× Polish League champion (2010–2011); FIBA EuroCup All-Star Day (2005)
- Stats at NBA.com
- Stats at Basketball Reference
Medals
Men's basketball
Representing (Federal Republic of Yugoslavia) FR Yugoslavia
'22 & under' European Championship
Gold medal – first place	1998 Italy	Under-20
European Championship for Juniors
Bronze medal – third place	1996 France	Under-18

Ratko Varda (Serbian Cyrillic: Ратко Варда; born 6 May 1979) is a Serbian-Bosnian former basketball player who played professionally for 22 years. Standing at 2.13 m (7 ft 0 in), he played the center position. He first represented FR Yugoslavia/Serbia and Montenegro junior national team, and later represented Bosnia and Herzegovina national basketball team internationally.

== Professional career ==
Varda came up through Partizan's youth system and made his debut during the 1995–96 season, before making himself eligible for the 2001 NBA draft. He ended up not getting selected but still found himself on the Detroit Pistons roster to the start of the 2001–02 season. Varda ended up spending two seasons in the NBA on the rosters of the Pistons and the Washington Wizards. However, he was officially featured in only 1 game. Varda's first and last NBA game was on February 12, 2002, in a 71–99 loss to the Phoenix Suns where he played for 5 and half minutes and record 5 points and 1 rebound.

In January 2003, he returned to Europe and signed with Union Olimpija until the end of the 2002–03 season. In the 2003–04 season he played in the Greek Basket League with Apollon Patras. In the 2004–05 season, he played with Beşiktaş of the Turkish Basketball League.

In the 2006–07 season, he played in the Spanish Liga ACB with Real Madrid, but he could not finish the season due to an anterior cruciate ligament in his left knee.

On October 29, 2007, he signed for the entire season of the Spanish championship with ViveMenorca, having recovered from his knee injury.

On August 21, 2008, he signed a two-year contract with the Lithuanian champions BC Žalgiris from Kaunas. Because of the financial problems of the club, he left Žalgiris in late November.

On January 26, 2009, he signed with the Russian club BC Khimki. On the last day of 2009, Varda signed a one-month contract with Asseco Prokom Gdynia of Poland. In 2010, Varda extend his contract with Prokom until the end of the 2010–11 season.

In August 2011, he returned to his former club Union Olimpija, signing a one-year contract. However, he left the team in December because of the club's financial difficulties and signed with BC Azovmash from Mariupol. He left the team in March by mutual agreement.

On September 29, 2012, he signed a one-month deal with Iranian club Mahram Tehran.

On November 5, 2012, he signed with Radnički Kragujevac. In January 2013, he got injured and missed the rest of the season.

On July 31, 2013, he signed a one-year deal with Mega Vizura.

In 2012 and 2013, he captained the Republika Srpska team in friendlies against Serbia.

On February 2, 2015, he signed with United Byblos Amchit of the Lebanese Basketball League.

On October 1, 2015, Varda signed with KK Kožuv of the Macedonian First League. On November 4, 2015, he parted ways with Kožuv after appearing in four league games and two BIBL games. On December 30, 2015, he signed with the Montenegrin club Sutjeska for the rest of the season. On February 3, 2016, he left Sutjeska and signed with Hekmeh of the Lebanese Basketball League for the rest of the 2016 season. On November 7, 2016, he re-signed with Hekmeh.

On March 7, 2017, Varda announced his retirement. However, in October 2017, he returned to professional basketball and signed with Serbian club Dynamic. On December 30, 2017, he parted ways with Dynamic.

== National team career ==
Varda first represented Serbia and Montenegro national basketball team. He won the bronze medal at the 1996 FIBA Europe Under-18 Championship in France, and gold medal at the 1998 FIBA Europe Under-20 Championship in Italy.

He was on the preliminary 17-man squad of coach Svetislav Pešić for the Eurobasket 2001 in Turkey. However he did not make the final roster for the Eurobasket. Three years later he was on Željko Obradović preliminary squad for the 2004 Summer Olympics in Athens. However he and Dejan Milojević were cut on July 20, 2004.

After not getting opportunity to play for Serbian national team, Varda accepted offer to play for the Bosnia and Herzegovina national basketball team. He represented Bosnian national team in FIBA EuroBasket 2009 qualification and FIBA EuroBasket 2011 qualification. He left the Bosnian national team in 2011, after conflict with coach Sabit Hadžić.

In June 2016, Varda represented a composite selection of the Macedonian national team at two exhibition tournaments in China, under head coach Dragan Raca. The squad consisted of seven young Macedonian players, four American players being considered for naturalisation, and Varda, who was included to provide experience and assist in the development of the team's younger centers. On 22 June, he recorded 21 points and six rebounds in a victory over a United States college selection at the tournament in Zhuzhou.

== Personal life ==
A Serb, Varda was born in Gradiška, SR Bosnia and Herzegovina, SFR Yugoslavia (now Bosnia and Herzegovina). His family moved to Serbia during the Bosnian War. He has a tattoo of Saint George and the Dragon.
