= Tomas Delininkaitis =

Lithuanian basketball player

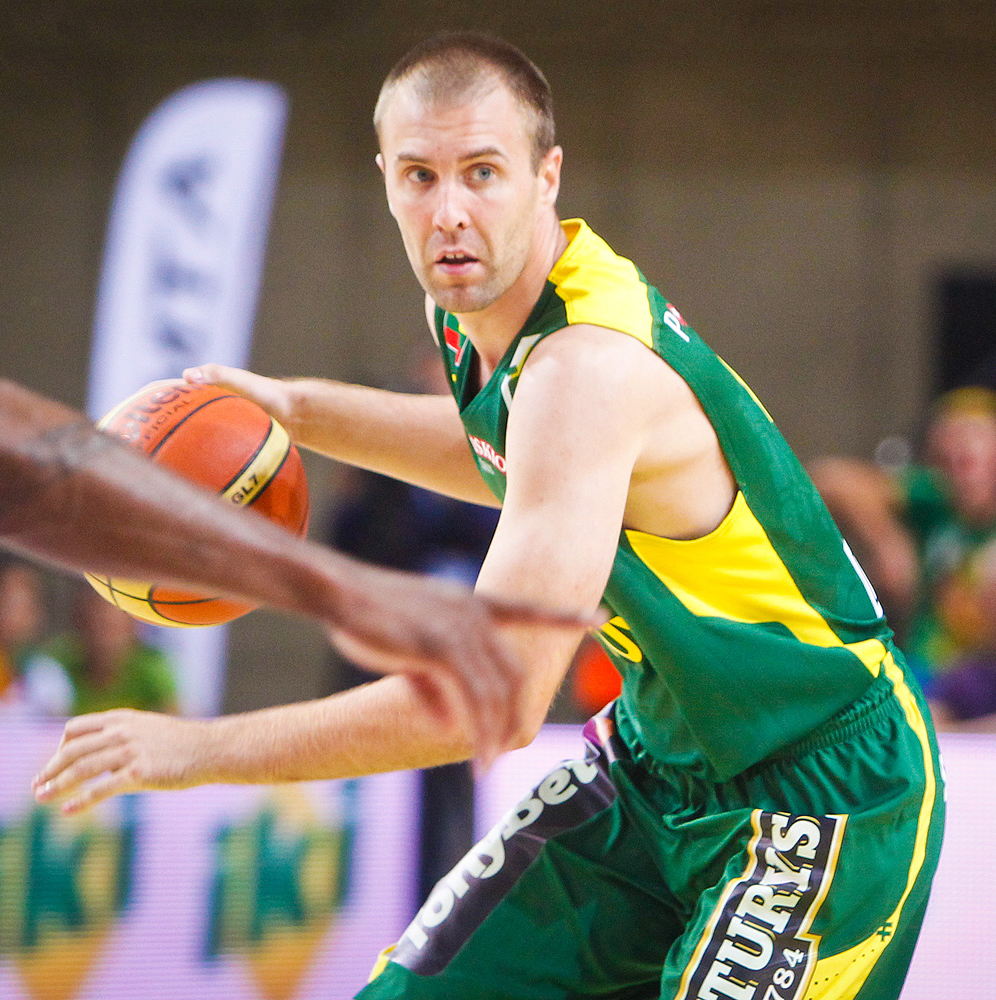
- Delininkaitis with Lithuanian national team

Personal information
- Born: 11 June 1982 (age 44) Klaipėda, Lithuania
- Listed height: 6 ft 2.75 in (1.90 m)
- Listed weight: 187 lb (85 kg)

Career information
- NBA draft: 2004: undrafted
- Playing career: 2001–2024
- Position: Shooting guard / point guard
- Number: 9, 10, 99, 5, 21, 25

Career history
- 2001–2002: Neptūnas Klaipėda
- 2002–2007: Lietuvos rytas Vilnius
- 2007–2009: Azovmash Mariupol
- 2009: Budivelnyk Kyiv
- 2009–2010: CB Murcia
- 2010: PAOK
- 2010–2012: Žalgiris Kaunas
- 2012–2013: Cherkaski Mavpy
- 2013: VEF Rīga
- 2013–2014: Torku Selçuk Üniversitesi
- 2014–2015: AEK Athens
- 2016: Rethymno Cretan Kings
- 2016–2017: Vytautas Prienai–Birštonas
- 2017–2020: Neptūnas Klaipėda
- 2020–2021: CBet Jonava
- 2022: Juventus Utena
- 2022–2024: Jurbarkas-Karys

Career highlights
- EuroCup champion (2005); 5× BBL champion (2005, 2007, 2011, 2012, 2017); 3× LKL champion (2006, 2011, 2012); LKL Finals MVP (2012); All-LKL Team (2017); LKL All-Star (2011); NKL champion (2021, 2024); RKL champion (2023)

Tomas Delininkaitis (born 11 June 1982) is a Lithuanian former professional basketball player. He was a member of the Lithuanian national basketball team at the 2010 FIBA World Championship. He is a 1.90 m (6 ft 2 3/4 in) tall combo guard.

== Professional career ==
Delininkaitis established his career in Lietuvos Rytas. Alongside Robertas Javtokas and Simas Jasaitis, he led Rytas to an ULEB Cup (now called EuroCup) trophy in 2005, although Rytas lost the LKL and BBL titles to their Lithuanian rivals Žalgiris that season.

In the next season, Rytas played in the EuroLeague, where Delininkaitis began to fade away from his leadership role in the team, and he was left only as a reserve player. Still, Rytas had their best season that year, winning their easiest LKL Finals series (4–0) against Žalgiris. In his last season with Rytas, Delininkaits was the team's sixth man, and he helped Rytas reach their 2nd ULEB Cup (EuroCup) final, which they lost to Real Madrid 75–87. In 2007, he signed with Azovmash Mariupol. In 2009, he joined Budivelnyk Kyiv. After playing a fraction of the 2008–2009 season, he moved to CB Murcia to start his 2009–2010 season. After the relegation and the financial problems of Murcia, his contract was terminated, and he joined PAOK, in April 2010. He appeared in 6 games (4 games of the regular season and 2 play-off games) for the Greek side, and he averaged 10.33 points, 2 rebounds, and 2.1 assists per game.

After winning a bronze medal with the senior Lithuanian national basketball team, in the 2010 FIBA World Championship, he was signed by Žalgiris Kaunas, and became a key player for the team.

On 5 November 2014, he signed with AEK Athens of the Greek Basket League. In 25 regular season games, he averaged 9.76 points, 1.4 rebounds, and 1.5 assists per game

On 12 January 2016, he signed with Rethymno of the Greek Basket League, for the rest of the season.

On 12 August 2016, he signed with Vytautas Prienai-Birštonas. In April, he helped BC Vytautas win the BBL championship, becoming the MVP in the process. Later he was named to the LKL All-Tournament Team on June 13, 2017.

On 20 July 2017, he signed with Neptūnas Klaipėda.

== National team career ==
At the 2010 FIBA World Championship, Delininkaitis played for the senior Lithuanian national basketball team, which won the tournament's bronze medal.

== Career statistics ==
Legend
GP	Games played	GS	Games started	MPG	Minutes per game
FG%	Field-goal percentage	3P%	3-point field-goal percentage	FT%	Free-throw percentage
RPG	Rebounds per game	APG	Assists per game	SPG	Steals per game
BPG	Blocks per game	PPG	Points per game	PIR	Performance index rating
**Bold**	Career high

=== EuroLeague ===
Year	Team	GP	GS	MPG	FG%	3P%	FT%	RPG	APG	SPG	BPG	PPG	PIR
2005–06	Lietuvos Rytas	**19**	2	14.3	.323	.264	.714	1.1	1.0	**.5**	.0	5.2	2.4
2010–11	Žalgiris	16	**5**	**19.5**	.374	.388	**.851**	**1.9**	**2.0**	**.5**	.0	**8.8**	**8.1**
2011–12	Žalgiris	16	4	10.8	**.466**	**.467**	.682	.8	.9	.4	.0	5.2	3.2
Career		51	11	14.9	.376	.360	.769	1.2	1.3	.5	.0	6.3	4.5

== Awards and achievements ==
=== Pro clubs ===
- 3× Lithuanian League Champion: 2006, 2011, 2012
- 4× BBL Champion: 2006, 2007, 2011, 2012
- EuroCup Champion: 2005
- Eurocup Runner-up: 2007
- BBL Runner-up: 2005
- 3× LKL Runner-up: 2004, 2005, 2007
- Ukrainian League Champion: 2008

=== Lithuanian national team ===
- 2010 FIBA World Championship, Turkey: Bronze
- EuroBasket 2013: Silver
