= Stefan Glogovac =

Bosnian basketball player

Personal information
- Born: 13 June 1994 (age 32) Trebinje, Bosnia and Herzegovina
- Listed height: 6 ft 8 in (2.03 m)

Career information
- NBA draft: 2016: undrafted
- Playing career: 2013–present
- Position: Power forward

Career history
- 2013–2016: Spars Sarajevo
- 2016–2017: Mega Leks
- 2017–2018: Igokea
- 2018–2019: Spars Sarajevo
- 2019–2020: Zrinjski
- 2020: Borac Banja Luka
- 2020–2021: Jedinstvo
- 2021–2023: Târgu Jiu

Career highlights
- Bosnian League champion (2017); Bosnian Cup winner (2018)

Stefan Glogovac (born 13 June 1994) is a Bosnian professional basketball player.
