= Valdas Dabkus =

Lithuanian basketball player (born 1984)

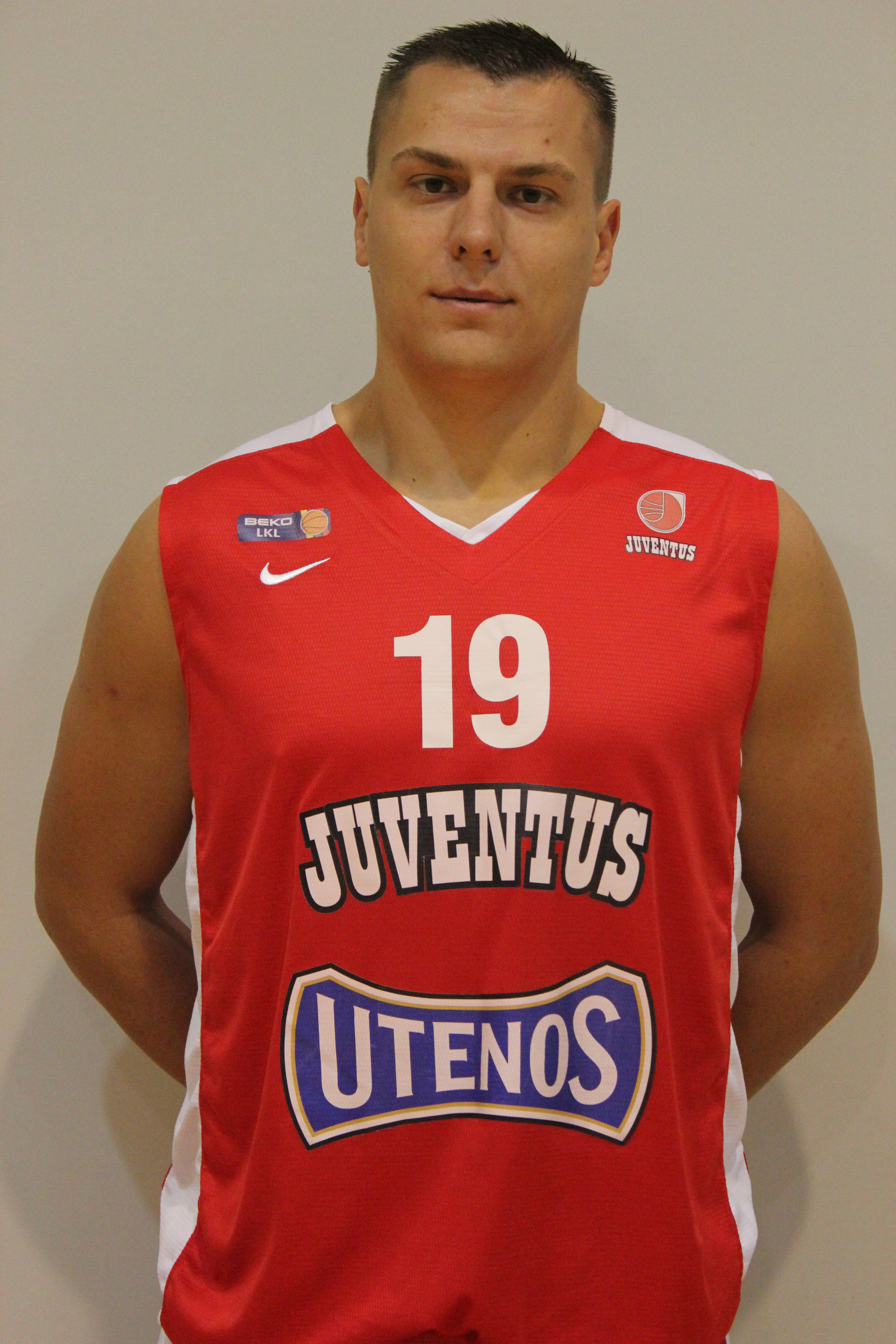
- Dabkus with Juventus Utena in 2014

Personal information
- Born: March 26, 1984 (age 42) Kaunas, Lithuania
- Listed height: 2.05 m (6 ft 9 in)
- Listed weight: 103 kg (227 lb)

Career information
- NBA draft: 2006: undrafted
- Playing career: 2001–2015
- Position: Small forward / power forward
- Number: 19

Career history
- 2001–2002: BC Žalgiris-2 (LKAL)
- 2003: Atletas Kaunas (LKL)
- 2003: Anwil Włocławek (PLK)
- 2003–2005: Metis Varese (Serie A)
- 2005–2006: Livu alus Liepāja (LBL)
- 2006–2007: Atletas Kaunas (LKL)
- 2007–2008: Aisčiai-Atletas Kaunas (LKL)
- 2008–2009: Nevėžis Kėdainiai (LKL)
- 2009–2010: AEK Larnaca (CBD1)
- 2010: Rūdupis Prienai (LKL)
- 2010–2012: ETHA Engomis (CBD1)
- 2012: Rūdupis Prienai
- 2012–2013: Lietkabelis Panevėžys
- 2012–2013: →Czarni Słupsk
- 2013–2014: Nevėžis Kėdainiai (LKL)
- 2014–2015: Juventus Utena (LKL)

Career highlights
- FIBA Europe U-18 All-Tournament Team (2002); PLK champion (2003); CBD1 champion (2011); Cypriot Cup (2011)
Medals
Men's basketball
Representing Lithuania
FIBA World Under-19 Cup
Silver medal – second place	2003 Greece	Under-19
FIBA Europe Under-20 Championship
Bronze medal – third place	2004 Czech Republic	Under-20

Valdas Dabkus (born March 26, 1984) is a Lithuanian professional basketball player. Dabkus plays at the small forward and power forward positions.

== National team career ==
Dabkus previously represented the Lithuanian youth squads, and won a silver medal with the Lithuanian Under-19 Team, at the 2003 FIBA Under-19 World Championship. He also won a bronze medal with the Lithuanian Under-20 Team, at the 2004 FIBA Europe Under-20 Championship.
