= Veski, Vladimir Oblast =

Veski Вески
- Village
- Location within Vladimir Oblast Location within Russia
- Coordinates: 56°24′N 38°47′E
- Country: Russia
- Region: Vladimir Oblast
- District: Alexandrovsky District
- Time zone: UTC+3:00

Veski (Russian: Вески) is a rural locality (a village) in Andreyevskoye Rural Settlement, Alexandrovsky District, Vladimir Oblast, Russia. The population was 81 as of 2010. There are 4 streets.

== Geography ==
Veski is located 5 km east of Alexandrov (the district's administrative centre) by road. Svetly is the nearest rural locality.
