= Ingus Bankevics =

Latvian basketball player (born 1985)

Ingus Bankevics (born 18 April 1985) is a Latvian professional basketball player, who last played the shooting guard position for the English club Manchester Giants. He has previously played for Latvian national team Throughout his playing career.

In 2008, he won the Baltic Basketball League three-point shooting contest. In February 2011, he broke his contract with BK Ventspils. After several seasons in Latvian Basketball League (LBL) clubs, he moved abroad, initially playing in France and Lithuania, and later in the United Kingdom, where he represented Manchester Giants for many seasons.

== Pro clubs ==
- (Latvia) BK Gulbenes Buki
- (Latvia) BK Valmiera
- (Latvia) BK VEF Rīga
- (France) Stade Olympique Maritime Boulonnais
- (France) Saint-Chamond Basket
- (Lithuania) BC Pieno žvaigždės
- (England) Manchester Giants
