= Viljar Veski =

Estonian basketball player

Personal information
- Born: April 29, 1986 (age 40) Tallinn, then part of Estonian SSR, Soviet Union
- Listed height: 7 ft 1 in (2.16 m)
- Listed weight: 240 lb (109 kg)

Career information
- Playing career: 2003–2017
- Position: Center

Career history
- 2003–2005: Rakvere Tarvas
- 2005–2007: Nybit
- 2007–2008: Palma Aqua Magica
- 2008–2010: BC Kalev/Cramo
- 2010–2012: Rakvere Tarvas
- 2012–2013: Palma Air Europa
- 2013–2017: Valga

Viljar Veski (born April 29, 1986) is retired Estonian basketball player. Viljar Veski played center position. Veski has also been a member of the Estonia national basketball team since 2008.

== Honours ==
- 2008–09 Estonian Cup (BC Kalev/Cramo)
- 2008–09 Estonian League (BC Kalev/Cramo)
