= Benjamin Eze =

Nigerian-Italian basketball player

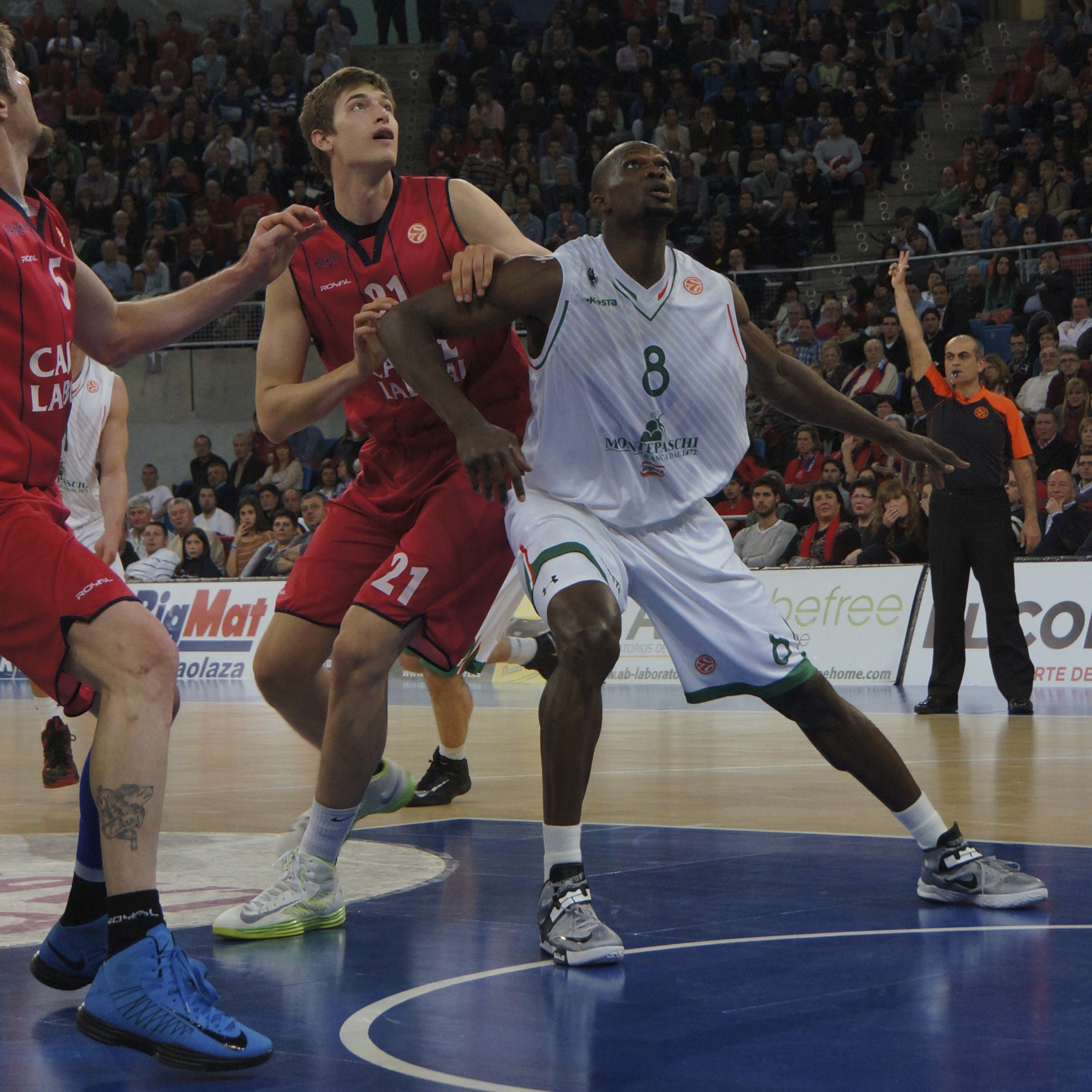
- Eze while playing with Montepaschi Siena

Personal information
- Born: February 8, 1981 (age 45) Lagos, Nigeria
- Listed height: 6 ft 10 in (2.08 m)
- Listed weight: 255 lb (116 kg)

Career information
- College: College of Southern Idaho (1999–2001)
- NBA draft: 2001: Undrafted
- Playing career: 1998–2014
- Position: Center

Career history
- 1998: Avtodor Saratov
- 2001: Geoplin Slovan
- 2001–2004: Viola Reggio Calabria
- 2004–2010: Montepaschi Siena
- 2010–2011: Khimki
- 2011–2012: Olimpia Milano
- 2012–2013: Montepaschi Siena
- 2014: Dinamo Sassari

Career highlights
- 5× Italian League champion (2007–2010, 2013); 2× Italian Cup winner (2009–2010, 2013); 3× Italian Supercup winner (2007–2009)

Benjamin Ndubuisi Eze (born February 8, 1981) is a Nigerian-Italian former professional basketball player. He is a 2.08 m (6 ft 10 in) tall center.

== Professional career ==
Eze was brought from Nigeria to Russia during the 1998-99 season, where he played in 1 game with Avtodor Saratov. After leaving Russia, Eze moved to the United States and signed to play with the University of Louisville Cardinals. However, Eze was declared ineligible because of the game in Russia for the 1999-00 basketball year. He then transferred to the College of Southern Idaho junior college, where he averaged 7.5 points and 5.2 rebounds per game. He declared himself eligible for the 2001 NBA draft but went undrafted.

In 2011, he signed with Olimpia Milano. On February 6, 2014, he signed with Dinamo Sassari.

== Nigerian national team ==
Eze represented Nigeria at the 2005 FIBA Africa Championship, where Nigeria finished in third place, qualifying for the 2006 FIBA World Championship. Eze did not join the Nigerian team at the World Championship.
