= Arnas Labuckas =

Lithuanian basketball player (born 1987)

Personal information
- Born: 28 December 1987 (age 38) Kaunas, Lithuania
- Listed height: 2.06 m (6 ft 9 in)
- Listed weight: 99 kg (218 lb)

Career information
- Playing career: 2005–2019
- Position: Forward

Career history
- 2005–2009: Sakalai
- 2009–10: VEF
- 2010–11: BC Ryazan
- 2011–12: CB Sant Josep
- 2012–13: BC Prienai
- 2013: Zepter
- 2014: BC Šiauliai
- 2014–16: BC Lietkabelis
- 2016–18: VEF
- 2018–19: SkyCop Prienai

Career highlights
- All-Superleague 1st Team (2011); LKF winner (2013); BBL champion (2014); LBL champion (2017)

Arnas Labuckas (born 28 December 1987) is a former professional Lithuanian basketball player. Most of career spent in home country, he also played abroad for Russian, Spanish, Austrian and Latvian clubs. He was also member of youth and students' Lithuania men's national basketball team. Labuckas married fellow basketball player Giedrė Labuckienė (née Paugaitė).
