= Travis Watson =

American professional basketball player (born 1981)

Personal information
- Born: March 20, 1981 (age 45) San Antonio, Texas, U.S.
- Listed height: 6 ft 7.75 in (2.03 m)
- Listed weight: 256 lb (116 kg)

Career information
- High school: Oak Hill Academy (Mouth of Wilson, Virginia)
- College: Virginia (1999–2003)
- NBA draft: 2003: undrafted
- Playing career: 2003–2018
- Position: Power forward / center
- Number: 35

Career history
- 2003–2005: Panionios
- 2005–2006: Fortitudo Bologna
- 2006–2008: Olimpia Milano
- 2008–2009: Hapoel Jerusalem
- 2009–2011: Žalgiris Kaunas
- 2012: Enisey Krasnoyarsk
- 2013–2014: Lugano Tigers
- 2014–2015: Steaua București
- 2015: Lugano Tigers
- 2018: BC Vytis

Career highlights
- Italian Supercup winner (2005); Swiss League champion (2014); 2× Greek All Star (2004–2005); All-Greek League Team (2005); LKL champion (2011); VTB United League rebounding leader (2010); 2× EuroLeague rebounding leader (2008, 2010); LKF Cup winner (2011); 2× Baltic League champion (2010–2011); 2× LKL All-Star (2010–2011); 3× Second-team All-ACC (2001–2003); Third-team Parade All-American (1999); Virginia Mr. Basketball (1999)

Travis Watson (born March 20, 1981) is an American former professional basketball player. A 2.03 m tall power forward, he led the 2007–08 EuroLeague in rebounds with 9.7 per game while playing for Olimpia Milano.

== College career ==
Watson played college basketball at the University of Virginia and was named to the All-Atlantic Coast Conference Second Team following his junior and senior seasons.

== Professional career ==
Since 2003 Watson is playing in Europe. For the 2008–09 season Watson signed for Hapoel Jerusalem from the Israeli Basketball Super League. In August 2009 he signed with Žalgiris Kaunas. In July 2010, he renewed his contract and played for Žalgiris until the end of the 2010–11 season. Watson signed with Enisey Krasnoyarsk in August 2012, but the contract was terminated after he failed the medical examination.

In July 2013, he returned to Italy and signed with Vanoli Cremona. On September 14, 2013, he parted ways with Cremona. Later that month he signed with Lugano Tigers. In the summer of 2014, he signed with CSA Steaua București. After a few year absence, Watson signed with BC Vytis of the National Basketball League in Lithuania.

== Career statistics ==
Legend
GP	Games played	GS	Games started	MPG	Minutes per game
FG%	Field-goal percentage	3P%	3-point field-goal percentage	FT%	Free-throw percentage
RPG	Rebounds per game	APG	Assists per game	SPG	Steals per game
BPG	Blocks per game	PPG	Points per game	PIR	Performance index rating
**Bold**	Career high

=== EuroLeague ===
*	Led the league

Year	Team	GP	GS	MPG	FG%	3P%	FT%	RPG	APG	SPG	BPG	PPG	PIR
2005–06	Fortitudo Bologna	**20**	2	19.5	.525	.000	.647	7.3	1.1	1.3	.6	8.0	11.3
2007–08	Milano	14	**13**	**25.3**	**.632**	**1.000**	.443	**9.7***	1.2	**1.9**	.4	**11.7**	**18.0**
2009–10	Žalgiris	13	12	25.2	.591	.000	**.737**	9.5*	**1.5**	.7	**.7**	10.6	16.2
2010–11	Žalgiris	15	10	18.0	.543	—	.605	4.7	.7	1.0	.5	6.6	6.4
Career		62	37	21.8	.571	.333	.590	7.7	1.1	1.2	.6	9.0	12.6
