= Tadas Klimavičius =

Lithuanian basketball player

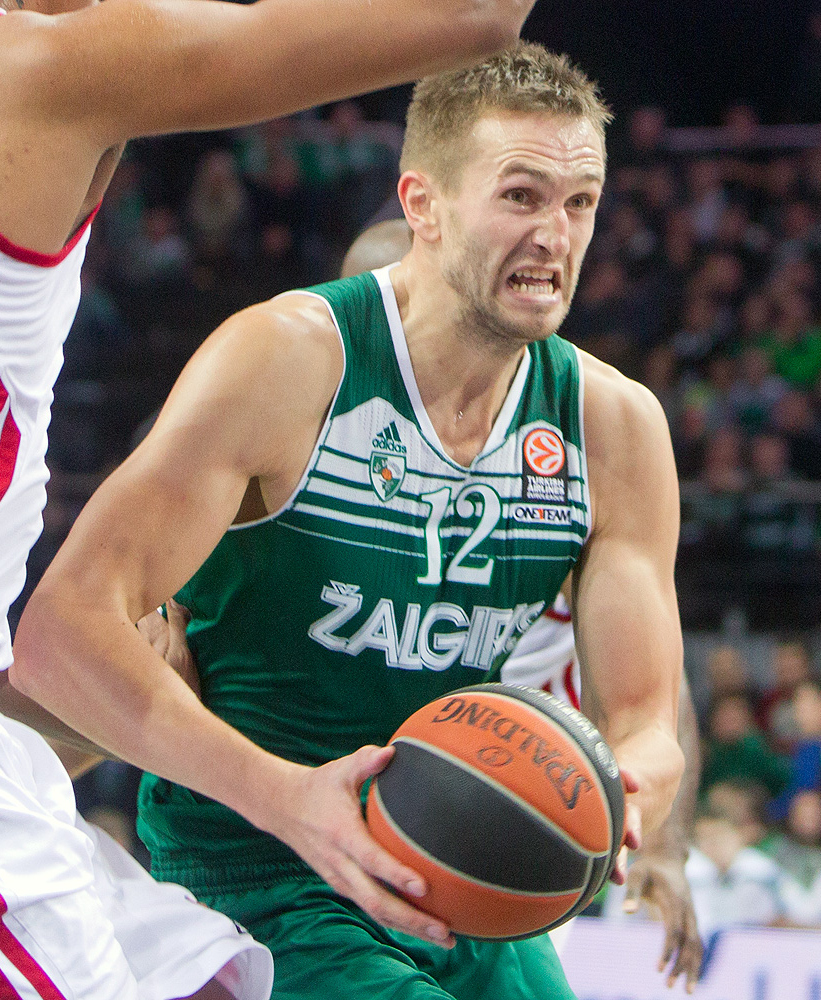
- Klimavičius with Žalgiris Kaunas in 2013

Personal information
- Born: 10 October 1982 (age 44) Kaunas, Lithuania
- Listed height: 2.04 m (6 ft 8 in)
- Listed weight: 104 kg (229 lb)

Career information
- NBA draft: 2004: undrafted
- Playing career: 2002–2023
- Position: Power forward

Career history
- 2002–2004: Žalgiris Kaunas
- 2003–2004: →BC Alita
- 2004–2005: Fabriano Basket
- 2005–2007: BC Šiauliai
- 2007–2008: Olympia Larissa
- 2008–2014: Žalgiris Kaunas
- 2014–2016: Telekom Baskets Bonn
- 2016–2017: Neptūnas Klaipėda
- 2017–2018: Vytautas Prienai-Birštonas
- 2018-2023: BC Omega-Tauras-LSU

Career highlights
- 4× LKL champion (2011–2014); 3× LKL All-Star (2007, 2010, 2011); 3× BBL Champion (2011, 2012, 2017); BBL Finals MVP (2011)
Medals
Men's Basketball
Representing Lithuania
World Cup
Bronze medal – third place	Turkey 2010	National team

Tadas Klimavičius (born 10 October 1982) is a Lithuanian former professional basketball player. Standing at 2.04 m (6 ft 8 1/2 in), he played as a power forward. He also represented Lithuania national basketball team internationally.

== Professional career ==
Klimavičius played for Žalgiris Kaunas, BC Alita, Fabriano Basket early in his career, before having breakout seasons with BC Šiauliai, helping them win LKL bronze medals in 2006 and 2007, BBL bronze medals in 2006, and helping Šiauliai in FIBA EuroChallenge competition. After a successful season with Olympia Larissa in Greece, Klimavičius returned to Žalgiris Kaunas. After a difficult 2008–09 season for the team, Klimavičius played his most successful season with Žalgiris, becoming one of the best players on the team, and helping the team in matches in the Euroleague and against Lietuvos rytas, winning the BBL championship in 2010.

In 2010, Klimavičius signed a new contract with Žalgiris for the 2010–11 season, with an option to prolong the contract for the 2011–12 season. In 2014, Klimavičius signed with Telekom Baskets Bonn of the Basketball Bundesliga.

On 4 August 2016 it was announced that Klimavičius signed with Neptūnas Klaipėda of the Lithuanian Basketball League.

On 24 January 2017 Klimavičius signed with Vytautas Prienai-Birštonas shortly after terminating his contract with Neptūnas. He became an important part in the Vytautas rotation, and helped the team to win the 2017 BBL championship. He left Vytautas in January, after suffering some injuries. He spent the last years of his career playing for BC Omega-Tauras-LSU of the Regional Basketball League, the third tier of Lithuanian Basketball.

== Lithuanian national team ==
At the 2010 FIBA World Championship he played for the Lithuanian national basketball team, which won Bronze medals.

== Career statistics ==
Legend
GP	Games played	GS	Games started	MPG	Minutes per game
FG%	Field-goal percentage	3P%	3-point field-goal percentage	FT%	Free-throw percentage
RPG	Rebounds per game	APG	Assists per game	SPG	Steals per game
BPG	Blocks per game	PPG	Points per game	PIR	Performance index rating
**Bold**	Career high

=== Euroleague ===
Year	Team	GP	GS	MPG	FG%	3P%	FT%	RPG	APG	SPG	BPG	PPG	PIR
2002–03	Žalgiris	4	0	5.5	.500	.333	.000	.8	.0	.3	.0	1.8	.3
2008–09	Žalgiris	10	0	13.0	**.548**	.000	.375	3.2	.3	**.4**	.6	3.7	4.2
2009–10	Žalgiris	14	6	**25.2**	.429	**.367**	.675	**4.1**	.8	.1	**.9**	**7.7**	**7.8**
2010–11	Žalgiris	16	**7**	16.0	.462	.231	**.727**	2.9	.4	.3	.3	3.9	2.4
2011–12	Žalgiris	16	0	15.0	.333	.235	.333	3.2	.6	.1	.4	2.2	2.6
2013–14	Žalgiris	**22**	3	13.5	.514	.111	.609	3.7	**1.2**	.3	.4	4.2	6.0

== Awards and achievements ==
- 2010 FIBA World Championship, Turkey – Bronze medalist
