= Mirza Begić =

Slovenian basketball player (born 1985)

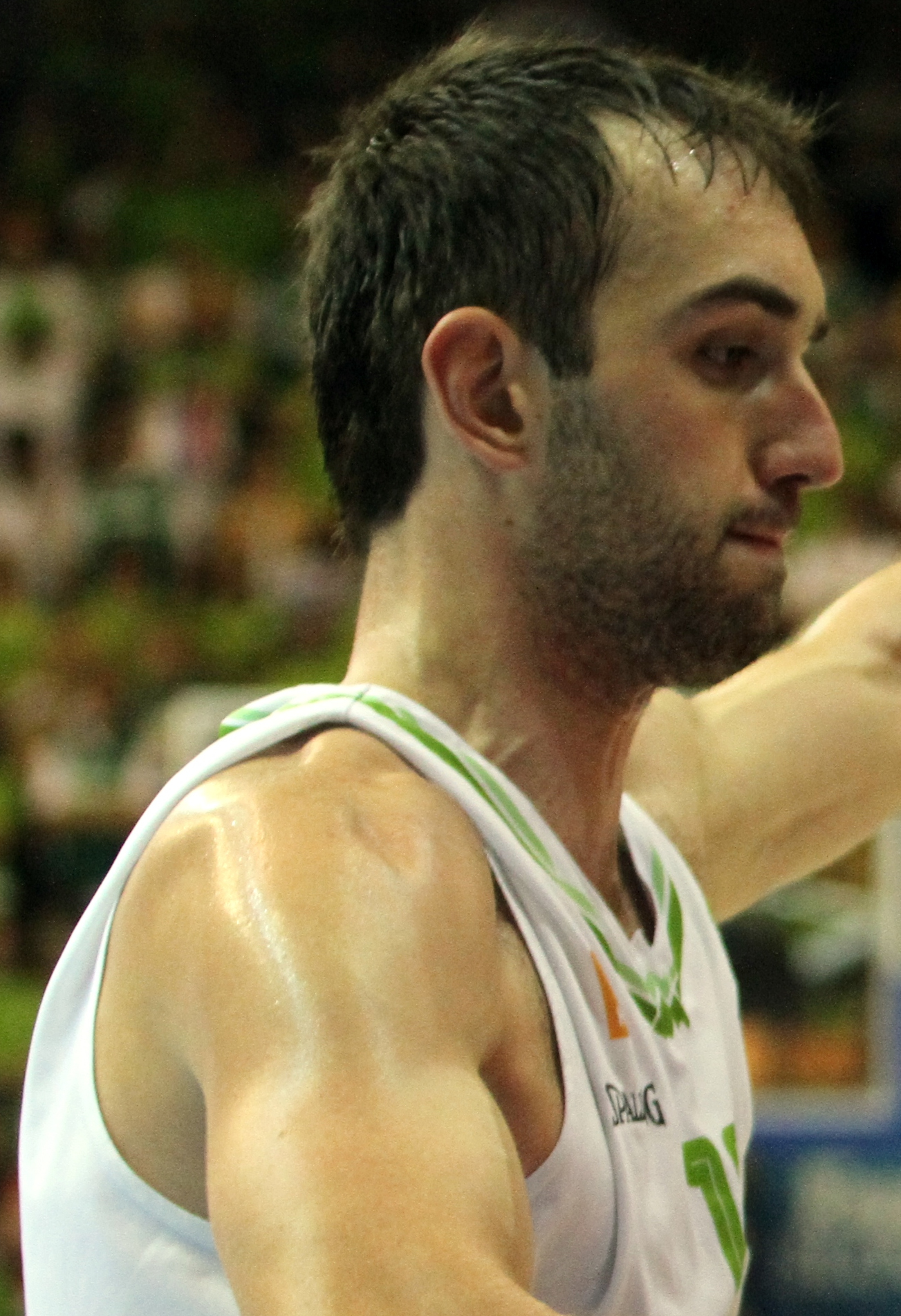
- Begić during EuroBasket 2013

Personal information
- Born: 9 July 1985 (age 41) Bijeljina, SR Bosnia and Herzegovina, SFR Yugoslavia
- Listed height: 2.16 m (7 ft 1 in)
- Listed weight: 120 kg (265 lb)

Career information
- NBA draft: 2007: undrafted
- Playing career: 2003–2020
- Position: Center
- Number: 14, 15, 16, 25

Career history
- 2003–2004: Triglav Kranj
- 2004–2006: Virtus Bologna
- 2004–2005: → Huy Basket
- 2006–2007: Geoplin Slovan
- 2007–2009: Union Olimpija
- 2009–2010: Žalgiris
- 2011–2013: Real Madrid
- 2013–2014: Olympiacos
- 2014: Union Olimpija
- 2014–2015: Laboral Kutxa
- 2015–2016: Bilbao Basket
- 2016–2017: Cedevita
- 2017–2018: Petrochimi Bandar Imam
- 2018–2019: Petrol Olimpija
- 2019–2020: Mornar

Career highlights
- FIBA Intercontinental Cup champion (2013); Baltic League champion (2010); 3× Slovenian League champion (2008, 2009, 2018); Spanish League champion (2013); Croatian League champion (2017); 2× Slovenian Cup winner (2008, 2009); Spanish Cup winner (2012); Croatian Cup winner (2017); EuroBasket blocked shots leader (2011); Spanish Supercup winner (2012); 2005 FIBA Europe Under-20 Championship blocked shots leader; 2× Slovenian League All-Star (2007, 2009); Lithuanian League All-Star (2010); Euroleague blocked shots Leader (2011); FIBA EuroBasket 2011 blocked shots leader
- Stats at Basketball Reference

Mirza Begić (born 9 July 1985) is a retired Bosnian-born Slovenian professional basketball player. The 2.16 m (7 ft 1 in) center, he represented the Slovenian national team in the international competitions.

== Professional career ==
=== Early years ===
Begić began his career playing with Sloboda Dita Tuzla in Bosnia and Herzegovina. He made his professional debut with Sloboda in the Bosnia and Herzegovina League during the 2001–02 season.

He then arrived to Slovenia in 2002, and stayed in KK Koper for 2 months. In the 2002–03 season, he played for Union Olimpija's junior team. Then he moved to Triglav Kranj in the Slovenian League. Begić averaged 7 points, 5 rebounds, and 1.7 blocks, in 16.9 minutes in his first season in the Slovenian League in 2003–04.

In 2004, Begić signed with the Italian League club Virtus Bologna. In his first season with the club he was loaned to Huy Basket in Belgium's First Division. He averaged 6.3 points and 4.2 rebounds per game. In the 2005-06 season, he was released by Virtus Bologna.

In the 2006–07 season, Begić moved back to Slovenia. He signed with Geoplin Slovan. He averaged 9.8 points, 6.0 rebounds, and 1.9 blocks in 22.2 minutes per game in the Adriatic League, and 9.3 points, 5.7 rebounds, and 1.5 blocks per game in the Slovenian League.

=== Union Olimpija ===
On 30 July 2007 Begić signed a 2-year contract with Union Olimpija. He made his Euroleague debut on 24 October 2007 versus the Italian League club Montepaschi Siena. Begić averaged 3.6 points and 2.8 rebounds per game in his first season of the Euroleague play. In his second season in Euroleague, he averaged career-high 11.1 points and 6.1 rebounds per game.

In his second season in the Adriatic League, he averaged 3.9 points and 3.5 rebounds per game. He played in the 2008 Adriatic League Final Four in Ljubljana, where his team, Union Olimpija, lost in the semifinals against Partizan Belgrade. In his third season in the Adriatic League, he finished with averages of 8.9 points and 4.5 rebounds per game. He won the Slovenian National Championship and Slovenian Cup with Union Olimpija in 2008 and 2009. On 24 November 2008 he renewed his contract through the end of the 2010–11 season.

=== Real Madrid ===
On 18 January 2011 Begić reached an agreement with the Spanish League club Real Madrid to play for the club until the end of the 2012–13 season. The 2012–13 season was successful for Begić in Real Madrid, reaching the Euroleague final and winning the Spanish League.

=== 2013–2020 ===
On 20 July 2013 Begić signed a two-year contract with the back-to-back defending Euroleague champions Olympiacos of the Greek League. He left Olympiacos after one season.

On 20 September 2014 Begić signed a one-year deal with his former team Union Olimpija. On 19 November 2014 he left Olimpija and signed a one-month deal with Laboral Kutxa Baskonia. On 24 December 2014 he extended his contract with Laboral Kutxa Baskonia for the rest of the season.

On 14 October 2015 Begić signed with the New Orleans Pelicans, only to be waived by the team two days later. On 7 December 2015 Begić signed with Spanish club Dominion Bilbao Basket for the rest of the season.

On 27 July 2016 Begić signed with Croatian club Cedevita Zagreb for the 2016–17 season.

On 13 August 2017 Begić signed with Petrochimi Bandar Imam of the Iranian Basketball Super League. On 17 January 2018 he returned to Olimpija.

On 15 July 2019 he signed with Mornar Bar. On 8 February 2020 he parted ways with Mornar averaging 3.6 points and 1.6 rebounds in 14 games of ABA League.

On 21 September 2020 he decided to retire from professional basketball.

== Career statistics ==
Legend
GP	Games played	GS	Games started	MPG	Minutes per game
FG%	Field-goal percentage	3P%	3-point field-goal percentage	FT%	Free-throw percentage
RPG	Rebounds per game	APG	Assists per game	SPG	Steals per game
BPG	Blocks per game	PPG	Points per game	PIR	Performance index rating
**Bold**	Career high	*	Led the league

=== EuroLeague ===
Year	Team	GP	GS	MPG	FG%	3P%	FT%	RPG	APG	SPG	BPG	PPG	PIR
2007–08	Olimpija	9	7	12.0	.542	—	.375	2.8	.2	**.7**	1.0	3.6	3.3
2008–09	Olimpija	10	9	**22.1**	.525	—	.692	**6.2**	.3	.6	**1.8**	**11.1**	**14.7**
2009–10	Žalgiris	16	12	19.8	.592	—	.718	4.0	**.5**	.5	1.3	7.4	8.8
2010–11	Žalgiris	10	3	21.6	.567	—	**.725**	4.9	**.5**	.6	2.3*	9.7	11.8
2010–11	Real Madrid	6	0	5.3	**.714**	—	.500	.7	—	.2	.2*	3.5	2.3
2011–12	Real Madrid	15	4	14.2	.545	—	.643	4.7	.4	.1	**1.7**	4.6	7.5
2012–13	Real Madrid	**29**	**23**	12.8	.532	—	.614	3.4	.3	.2	.9	5.0	5.5
2013–14	Olympiacos	12	3	8.4	.543	—	.625	2.0	.2	.1	.8	3.6	4.3
2014–15	Baskonia	18	3	17.3	.556	—	.705	4.4	.4	.4	**1.7**	6.8	10.2
Career		125	64	15.1	.554	—	.665	3.8	.3	.3	1.3	6.1	7.7

== Slovenian national team ==
Begić was a member of the Slovenian under-20 national team. He competed at the 2005 FIBA Europe Under-20 Championship in Russia, which he led in blocked shots per game. He has also been a member of the senior men's Slovenian national basketball team. He played at the EuroBasket 2011, which he also led in blocked shots per game.

== Personal life ==
Begić was born in Bijeljina, SR Bosnia and Herzegovina, Yugoslavia. He lived in his native Bosnia and Herzegovina until 2002, when he moved to Slovenia and subsequently took Slovenian citizenship.
