= Kaunas Sports Hall =

Lithuanian basketball arena

- Interactive map of Kaunas Sports Hall
- Location: Kaunas, Lithuania
- Coordinates: 54°53′46″N 23°56′09″E
- Capacity: 2,500 (seated); up to 4,000 (with standing zone)

Construction
- Groundbreaking: December 5, 1938
- Opened: May 21, 1939
- Cost: 400,000 LTL
- Architect: Anatolijus Rozenbliumas
- Builder: Povilas Dėdelė Co.

Tenants
- FK Kauno Žalgiris (futsal) (2022-Present); BC Žalgiris (1944-2011)

Website
- stadionas.lt

Kaunas Sports Hall (Lithuanian: Kauno sporto halė), also known as the S. Darius and S. Girėnas Hall is the second largest arena of Kaunas, Lithuania. It is the first arena built in the residential Žaliakalnis neighbourhood of Kaunas specially for basketball in Europe and is referred to as a "Mecca of the Lithuanian basketball". The arena's seating capacity is 2,500. Initial seating capacity was 3,500 and the other spectators (up to 11,000) used to have standing room. Its length is 62.8 m (206 ft) and its width is 61 m (200 ft). It is a part of the S. Darius and S. Girėnas sport center, which also includes the nearby national stadium.

The arena generally hosts basketball games and concerts. It has served as the home court for Žalgiris basketball club, competing in the Euroleague and the LKL League till the middle of 2011. It was also used by the Granitas Kaunas team handball club.

Kaunas Sports Hall belongs to Žalgiris Group, which operates Darius and Girėnas Stadium and Žalgirio Arena, which are the largest structures of their kind in the Baltic States.

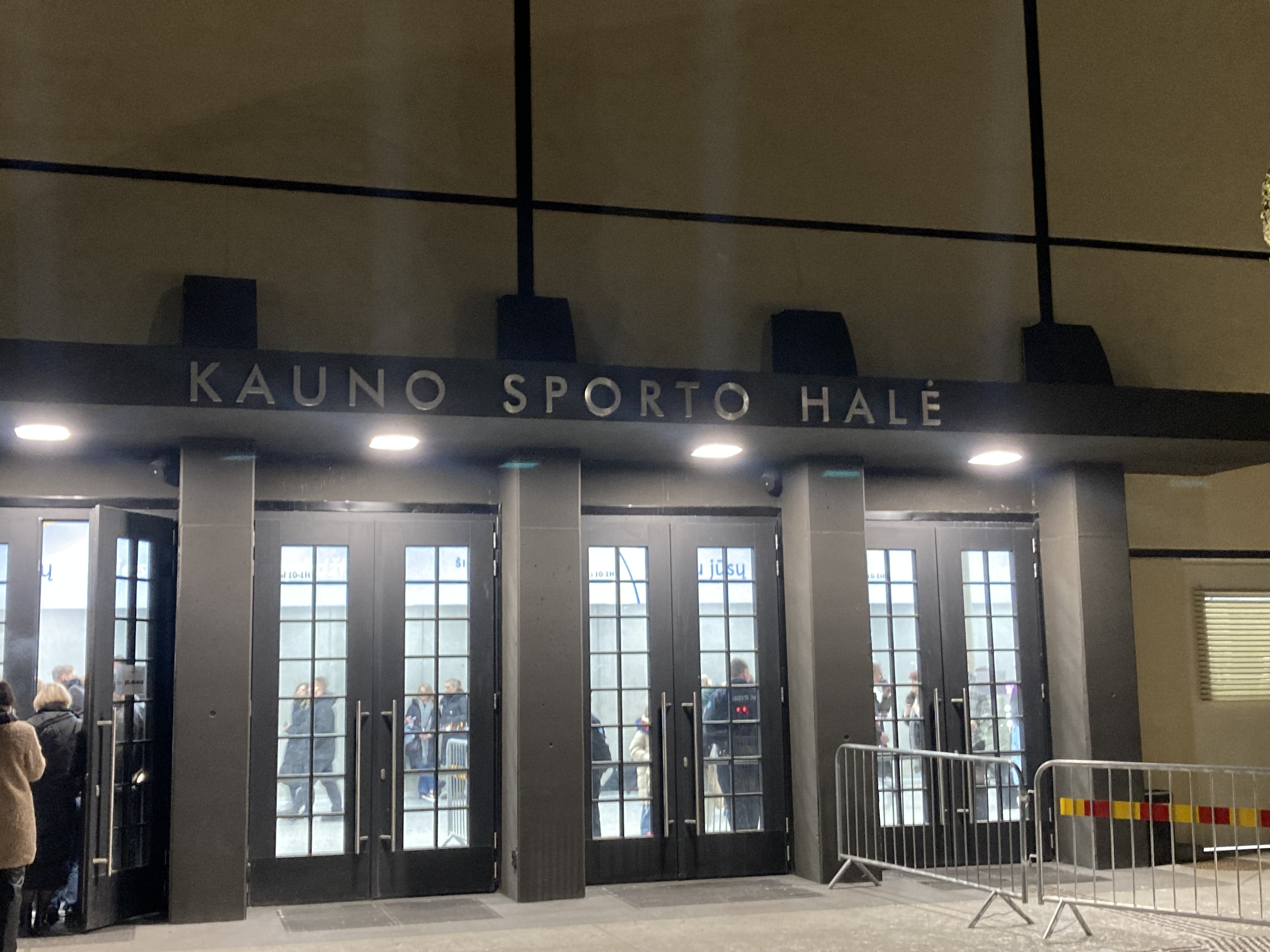
Kaunas Sports Hall

== History ==
The construction of the hall cost 400.000 LTL and at first had 3600 seats and 7000 standing spots. It was regarded as the biggest basketball stadium in the whole world.

Since its establishment, the Kaunas Sports Hall is situated in close proximity to the Lithuanian Academy of Physical Education and the S. Darius and S. Girėnas Stadium, adjacent to the Ąžuolynas Park. The arena was completed before the 3rd European Basketball Championship in 1939. The foundation was laid in December 1938. All the steel constructions were finished by April 1939 and masonry work on May 10 of the same year. It was a venue of the EuroBasket 1939.

According to Lithuanian President Valdas Adamkus, following the Soviet occupation of Lithuania in 1940 a Lithuanian Teachers' Congress was held at the Kaunas Sports Hall with hopes that the teachers will demonstrate their solidarity with the new Soviet Government in Lithuania, however during the congress the attended teachers sang the Tautiška giesmė, the anthem of Independent Lithuania, and this way demonstrated their patriotic sentiments instead.

In 1944–2010 it was the home arena of Žalgiris Kaunas. In December 2005, it underwent a minor reconstruction and added some 525 additional seats to reach the current capacity of 5,000. Until the year 2009 it fit the criteria of the Euroleague relations for minimum seating requirements, but not after that when the minimum league's requirement to accommodate fans increased to 10,000.

In August 2011 a larger and much more modern Žalgiris Arena has been opened in Kaunas, as Lithuania was hosting the 37th European Basketball Championship. The Kaunas Sports Hall will long be remembered as the arena where the Lithuanian national basketball team won their consecutive Gold medal at the Eurobasket 1939. The Kaunas Sports Hall was included into the Registry of Immovable Cultural Heritage Sites of the Republic of Lithuania in 1993.

In 2019-2022, the reconstruction of the Kaunas Sports Hall was carried out. During the reconstruction of the sports hall, the facade, roof and supporting structures were repaired, all engineering networks and premises were renovated. The building was restored to its original appearance, and valuable features were preserved and restored - the arches supporting the roof, doors and windows.

Telescopic stands were installed inside, which can be extended as needed. Special acoustic curtains allow the huge space to be divided into four smaller zones so that different activities can take place simultaneously.

The renovated multifunctional spaces, depending on the nature of the event and the layout of the hall, accommodate from 20 to 4000 people at a time.

== Events ==
After the last reconstruction in 2022, Kaunas Sports Hall regularly hosts sports and cultural events.

In 2023, during the 2023 EuroLeague Final Four, the final stage of the Euroleague Basketball Next Generation Tournament was held at the Kaunas Sports Hall.

Since 2022, concerts at the Kaunas Sports Hall have already been held by Fedde Le Grand, Rokan Yan, G&G Sindikatas, Gabrielius Vagelis and Nombeko Augustė, Radži, Gregorian, Adriana Ramonaitė-Adrina, Lemon Joy, Sisters on Wire, Antikvariniai Kašpirovskio dantys and other performers.

On July 17-19, 2026, the Lithuanian Functional Fitness Championship 2026 was held at the Darius and Girėnas Stadium and Kaunas Sports Hall. The championship brought together athletes of various ages and abilities from Lithuania and all over Europe.

Most of the 2015 FIBA Europe Under-16 Championship games were held in the hall in 2015 (including the finals)

== Home Teams ==
The FK Kauno Žalgiris (futsal) currently plays its home games at the Kaunas Sports Hall.

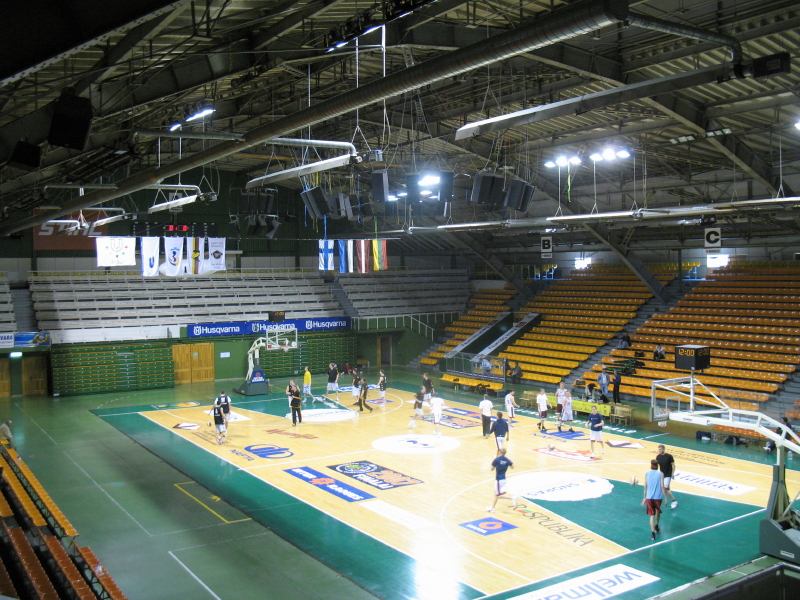
Inside Kaunas Sports Hall

Preceded by 1937 Final Venue; Riga	Eurobasket; Final Venue; 1939	Succeeded by 1946 Final Venue; Geneva
