= 2007–08 Slovenian Basketball League =

UPC League
- Season: 2007–08
- Duration: 13 October 2007 – 7 June 2008
- Teams: 12 + 1
- TV partner: RTV Slovenija

Regular season
- Top seed: Union Olimpija
- Season MVP: (Canada) Dejan Grković

Finals
- Champions: Union Olimpija; 14th title
- Runners-up: Helios Domžale
- Semifinalists: Krka; Zlatorog

Statistical leaders
Points	(Croatia) Miroslav Jurić	19.6
Rebounds	(Canada) Dejan Grković	8.8
Assists	(Slovenia) Jure Močnik	4.9

The 2007–08 Slovenian Basketball League (official: 2007–08 UPC League) was the 17th season of the Premier A Slovenian Basketball League, the highest professional basketball league in Slovenia. Union Olimpija won its 14th national championship.

== Teams for the 2007–08 season ==
Team	City	Arena	Capacity	Head coach
Alpos Šentjur	Šentjur	Hruševec Sports Hall	800	Matjaž Čuješ
Elektra Esotech	Šoštanj	Šoštanj Sport Hall	600	Ivan Stanišak
Geoplin Slovan	Ljubljana	Kodeljevo Sports Hall	1,540	Aleksander Sekulić
Helios Domžale	Domžale	Komunalni center Hall	2,500	Zoran Martič
Hopsi Polzela	Polzela	Polzela Sport Hall	1,800	Boštjan Kuhar
Kraški zidar Jadran	Sežana	SŠ Srečka Kosovela Sports Hall	900	Tomo Krašovec
Krka	Novo Mesto	Leon Štukelj Hall	2,800	Rade Mijanović
Luka Koper	Koper	Arena Bonifika	4,000	Mihailo Poček
Rogla Zreče	Zreče	Zreče Sports Hall	800	Slobodan Benić
TCG Mercator	Škofja Loka	Sports Hall OŠ Poljane	400	Matic Vidic
Union Olimpija*	Ljubljana	Tivoli Hall	4,050	Aleksandar Džikić
Zagorje KD FT	Zagorje	Sports Hall Zagorje ob Savi	800	Dušan Hauptman
Zlatorog Laško	Laško	Tri Lilije Hall	2,500	Damjan Novaković

Teams from the Adriatic League

== Regular season ==
Pos	Team	P	W	L	F	A	Pts
1	Helios Domžale	22	20	2	1995	1643	42
2	Krka	22	17	5	1945	1721	39
3	Zlatorog Laško	22	17	5	1941	1697	39
4	Geoplin Slovan	22	16	8	1855	1670	38
5	Luka Koper	22	13	9	1794	1739	35
6	Elektra Esotech	22	10	12	1751	1772	32
7	TCG Mercator	22	9	13	1766	1839	31
8	Hopsi Polzela	22	7	15	1757	1860	29
9	Alpos Šentjur	22	7	15	1678	1883	29
10	Kraški zidar Jadran	22	6	16	1680	1889	28
11	Zagorje KD FT	22	6	16	1681	1892	28
12	Rogla Zreče	22	4	18	1670	1908	26

P=Matches played, W=Matches won, L=Matches lost, F=Points for, A=Points against, Pts=Points

Qualified for the Champions stage

== Champions standings ==
Pos	Team	P	W	L	F	A	Pts
1	Union Olimpija	14	13	1	1245	996	27
2	Helios Domžale	14	10	4	1266	1098	24
3	Krka	14	8	6	1112	1086	22
4	Zlatorog Laško	14	8	6	1110	1067	22
5	Geoplin Slovan	14	8	6	1166	1152	22
6	Luka Koper	14	4	10	1058	1160	18
7	TCG Mercator	14	3	11	1010	1263	17
8	Elektra Esotech	14	2	12	1006	1156	16

P=Matches played, W=Matches won, L=Matches lost, F=Points for, A=Points against, Pts=Points

Qualified for the Playoff stage

== Relegation league ==
Pos	Team	P	W	L	F	A	Pts
1	Alpos Šentjur	30	12	18	2337	2466	42
2	Hopsi Polzela	30	12	18	2397	2458	42
3	Zagorje KD FT	30	11	19	2292	2516	41
4	Kraški zidar Jadran	30	9	21	2287	2535	39
5	Rogla Zreče	30	6	24	2282	2576	36

P=Matches played, W=Matches won, L=Matches lost, F=Points for, A=Points against, Pts=Points

Qualified for Relegation Playoffs
Relegated to Second Division

== Playoffs ==
Semi-finals
1	Union Olimpija	2
4	Zlatorog Laško	0
2	Helios Domžale	2
3	Krka	1

Final
1	Union Olimpija	3
2	Helios Domžale	1

Slovenian League 2007–08
Champions
Union Olimpija
14th title

== Relegation Playoffs ==
Pos	Team	P	W	L	F	A	Pts
1	Nova Gorica	4	4	0	312	280	8
2	Parklji Ljubljana	4	2	2	333	288	6
3	Kraški zidar Jadran	4	0	4	270	347	4

P=Matches played, W=Matches won, L=Matches lost, F=Points for, A=Points against, Pts=Points

Qualified for 2009–10 Slovenian First Division

== Statistics leaders ==
=== Performance Index Rating ===
Pos	Player	Club	PIR
1	(Canada) Dejan Grković	Rogla Zreče	19.19
2	(United States) DeMarco Johnson	Geoplin Slovan	17.43
3	(Slovenia) Jasmin Čatović	Hopsi Polzela	16.62

=== Points ===
Pos	Player	Club	PPG
1	(Croatia) Miroslav Jurić	Kraški zidar Jadran	19.58
2	(Slovenia) Jasmin Čatović	Hopsi Polzela	17.62
3	(Canada) Dejan Grković	Rogla Zreče	16.88

=== Rebounds ===
Pos	Player	Club	RPG
1	(Canada) Dejan Grković	Rogla Zreče	8.81
2	(North Macedonia) Kiril Pavlovski	Kraški zidar Jadran	7.53
3	(Slovenia) Stipe Modrić	Geoplin Slovan	7.48

=== Assists ===
Pos	Player	Club	APG
1	(Slovenia) Jure Močnik	Helios Domžale	4.85
2	(Slovenia) Nejc Glavaš	Zagorje KD FT	4.82
3	(Slovenia) Primož Brolih	Rogla Zreče	4.75
