= 2009–10 Slovenian Basketball League =

1. A SKL
- Season: 2009–10
- Duration: 3 October 2009 – 9 June 2010
- Teams: 12 + 1
- TV partner: RTV Slovenija

Regular season
- Top seed: Union Olimpija
- Season MVP: (Saint Vincent and the Grenadines) Shawn King

Finals
- Champions: Krka Novo Mesto; 3rd title
- Runners-up: Union Olimpija
- Semifinalists: Helios Domžale; Šentjur
- Finals MVP: (Slovenia) Smiljan Pavič

Statistical leaders
Points	(Slovenia) Sandi Čebular	20.7
Rebounds	(Saint Vincent and the Grenadines) Shawn King	11.3
Assists	(Slovenia) Tadej Koštomaj	5.4

The 2009–10 Slovenian Basketball League (official: 2009–10 Telemach League) was the 19th season of the Premier A Slovenian Basketball League, the highest professional basketball league in Slovenia. Krka Novo Mesto won its 3rd national championship.

== Teams for the 2009–10 season ==
Team	City	Arena	Capacity	Head coach
Elektra	Šoštanj	Šoštanj Sport Hall	600	Borut Cerar
Geoplin Slovan	Ljubljana	Kodeljevo Sports Hall	1,540	Miro Alilović
Helios*	Domžale	Komunalni center Hall	2,500	Rado Trifunović
Hopsi Polzela	Polzela	Polzela Sport Hall	1,800	Boštjan Kuhar
Krka	Novo Mesto	Leon Štukelj Hall	2,800	Aleksandar Džikić
Luka Koper	Koper	Arena Bonifika	4,000	Aleksander Sekulić
LTHcast Mercator	Škofja Loka	Poden Hall	500	Dalibor Damjanović
Union Olimpija*	Ljubljana	Tivoli Hall	4,050	Jure Zdovc
Parklji	Ljubljana	ŠRC Ježica	300	Đorđe Đokić
PRO-TEK Zasavje	Trbovlje	Polaj Sports Hall	1.500	Igor Pučko
Šenčur CP Kranj	Šenčur	Šenčur Sports Hall	800	Martin Gorenec
Šentjur	Šentjur	Hruševec Sports Hall	800	Damjan Novaković
Zlatorog Laško	Laško	Tri Lilije Hall	2,500	Aleš Pipan

Teams from the Adriatic League

== Regular season ==
Pos	Team	P	W	L	F	A	Pts
1	Krka	22	16	8	1748	1547	38
2	Helios Domžale	22	16	8	1684	1540	38
3	PRO-TEK Zasavje	22	15	7	1784	1695	37
4	Parklji Ljubljana	22	13	9	1695	1628	35
5	Geoplin Slovan	22	13	9	1720	1662	35
6	Zlatorog Laško	22	13	9	1761	1741	35
7	Šentjur	22	12	10	1711	1750	34
8	Hopsi Polzela	22	12	10	1708	1656	34
9	LTHcast Mercator	22	10	12	1542	1549	32
10	Elektra Šoštanj	22	8	14	1658	1719	30
11	Luka Koper	22	4	18	1660	1804	26
12	Šenčur CP Kranj	22	0	22	1459	1839	22

P=Matches played, W=Matches won, L=Matches lost, F=Points for, A=Points against, Pts=Points

Qualified for the Champions stage

== Champions standings ==
Pos	Team	P	W	L	F	A	Pts
1	Union Olimpija	14	12	2	1164	982	26
2	Krka	14	11	3	1169	959	25
3	Helios Domžale	14	11	3	1059	930	24
4	Šentjur	14	7	7	1076	1098	21
5	Parklji Ljubljana	14	5	9	1009	1167	19
6	PRO-TEK Zasavje	14	4	10	996	1114	18
7	Zlatorog Laško	14	3	11	1013	1099	17
8	Geoplin Slovan	14	3	11	1038	1122	17

P=Matches played, W=Matches won, L=Matches lost, F=Points for, A=Points against, Pts=Points

Qualified for the Playoff stage
Withdrew from competition

== Relegation league ==
Pos	Team	P	W	L	F	A	Pts
1	Hopsi Polzela	8	7	1	691	576	15
2	Elektra Šoštanj	8	7	1	634	555	15
3	Luka Koper	8	4	4	626	597	12
4	LTHcast Mercator	8	2	6	526	637	10
5	Šenčur CP Kranj	8	0	8	608	720	8

P=Matches played, W=Matches won, L=Matches lost, F=Points for, A=Points against, Pts=Points

Qualified for Relegation Playoffs
Relegated to Second Division

== Playoffs ==
Semi-finals
1	Union Olimpija	2
4	Šentjur	0
2	Krka	2
3	Helios Domžale	1

Final
1	Union Olimpija	2
2	Krka	3

Telemach League 2009–10
Champions

Krka
3rd title

== Relegation Playoffs ==
Finals
3	Luka Koper	2
2 (2.SKL)	Rogaška	0

== Awards ==
=== Regular Season MVP ===
- (Saint Vincent and the Grenadines) Shawn King (Hopsi Polzela)

=== Season MVP ===
- (Saint Vincent and the Grenadines) Shawn King (Hopsi Polzela)

=== Finals MVP ===
- (Slovenia) Smiljan Pavič (Krka)

== Statistics leaders ==
=== Performance Index Rating ===
Pos	Player	Club	PIR
1	(Saint Vincent and the Grenadines) Shawn King	Hopsi Polzela	27.61
2	(United States) Gregg Thondique	Hopsi Polzela	17.76
3	(Slovenia) Sandi Čebular	Šentjur	17.25

=== Points ===
Pos	Player	Club	PPG
1	(Slovenia) Sandi Čebular	Šentjur	20.69
2	(Saint Vincent and the Grenadines) Shawn King	Hopsi Polzela	20.61
3	(United States) Marcus Crenshaw	Šentjur	16.28

=== Rebounds ===
Pos	Player	Club	RPG
1	(Saint Vincent and the Grenadines) Shawn King	Hopsi Polzela	11.30
2	(United States) Gregg Thondique	Hopsi Polzela	8.14
3	(Serbia) Dušan Virijević	Šenčur CP Kranj	6.93

=== Assists ===
Pos	Player	Club	APG
1	(Slovenia) Tadej Koštomaj	Elektra Šoštanj	5.44
2	(United States) Marcus Crenshaw	Šentjur	5.06
3	(Croatia) Vladimir Anzulović	PRO-TEK Zasavje	4.06
