= 2008–09 Slovenian Basketball League =

UPC League
- Season: 2008–09
- Duration: 30 September 2008 – 9 June 2009
- Teams: 12 + 1
- TV partners: RTV Slovenija; Šport TV

Regular season
- Top seed: Union Olimpija
- Season MVP: (Saint Vincent and the Grenadines) Shawn King

Finals
- Champions: Union Olimpija; 15th title
- Runners-up: Helios Domžale
- Semifinalists: Krka; Zlatorog

Statistical leaders
Points	(United States) Gilbert Goodrich	22.2
Rebounds	(Saint Vincent and the Grenadines) Shawn King	14.8
Assists	(Slovenia) Jure Močnik	4.6

The 2008–09 Slovenian Basketball League (official: 2008–09 UPC League) was the 18th season of the Premier A Slovenian Basketball League, the highest professional basketball league in Slovenia. Union Olimpija won its 15th national championship.

== Teams for the 2008–09 season ==
Team	City	Arena	Capacity	Head coach
Alpos Šentjur	Šentjur	Hruševec Sports Hall	800	Boštjan Kočar
CPG Nova Gorica	Nova Gorica	Sports Hall OŠ Milojke Štrukelj	400	Dejan Gašparin
Elektra Esotech	Šoštanj	Šoštanj Sport Hall	600	Borut Cerar
Epic Misel Postojna	Postojna	Sports Hall ŠC Postojna	400	Aleš Lenassi
Geoplin Slovan	Ljubljana	Kodeljevo Sports Hall	1,540	Miro Alilović
Helios Domžale	Domžale	Komunalni center Hall	2,500	Rade Mijanović
Hopsi Polzela	Polzela	Polzela Sport Hall	1,800	Boštjan Kuhar
Krka	Novo Mesto	Leon Štukelj Hall	2,800	Ivan Sunara
Luka Koper	Koper	Arena Bonifika	4,000	Ivan Stanišak
TCG Mercator	Škofja Loka	Sports Hall OŠ Poljane	400	Matic Vidic
Union Olimpija*	Ljubljana	Tivoli Hall	4,050	Jure Zdovc
Zagorje	Zagorje	Sports Hall Zagorje ob Savi	800	Dušan Hauptman
Zlatorog Laško	Laško	Tri Lilije Hall	2,500	Aleš Pipan

Teams from the Adriatic League

== Regular season ==
Pos	Team	P	W	L	F	A	Pts
1	Krka	22	19	3	1841	1588	41
2	Helios Domžale	22	18	4	1822	1511	40
3	Zlatorog Laško	22	17	5	1761	1741	39
4	Geoplin Slovan	22	15	7	1791	1720	37
5	Hopsi Polzela	22	12	10	1787	1697	34
6	Elektra Esotech	22	9	13	1633	1749	31
7	Luka Koper	22	8	14	1747	1826	30
8	Zagorje	22	8	14	1650	1807	30
9	TCG Mercator	22	8	14	1561	1715	30
10	Alpos Šentjur	22	7	15	1641	1734	29
11	Epic Misel Postojna	22	7	15	1575	1825	29
12	CPG Nova Gorica	22	4	18	1543	1759	26

P=Matches played, W=Matches won, L=Matches lost, F=Points for, A=Points against, Pts=Points

Qualified for the Champions stage

== Champions standings ==
Pos	Team	P	W	L	F	A	Pts
1	Union Olimpija	14	13	1	1126	898	27
2	Helios Domžale	14	12	2	1172	1029	26
3	Krka	14	9	5	1067	1039	23
4	Zlatorog Laško	14	7	7	1098	1054	21
5	Geoplin Slovan	14	6	8	1066	1142	20
6	Hopsi Polzela	14	5	9	1074	1154	19
7	Luka Koper	14	2	12	1119	1296	16
8	Elektra Esotech	14	2	12	1065	1175	16

P=Matches played, W=Matches won, L=Matches lost, F=Points for, A=Points against, Pts=Points

Qualified for the Playoff stage

== Relegation league ==
Pos	Team	P	W	L	F	A	Pts
1	TCG Mercator	30	12	18	2155	2302	42
2	Zagorje	30	12	18	2275	2440	42
3	Alpos Šentjur	30	11	19	2256	2339	41
4	Epic Misel Postojna	30	10	20	2133	2417	40
5	CPG Nova Gorica	30	9	21	2146	2336	39

P=Matches played, W=Matches won, L=Matches lost, F=Points for, A=Points against, Pts=Points

Qualified for Relegation Playoffs
Relegated to Second Division

== Playoffs ==
Semi-finals
1	Union Olimpija	2
4	Zlatorog Laško	1
2	Helios Domžale	2
3	Krka	0

Final
1	Union Olimpija	3
2	Helios Domžale	0

Slovenian League 2008–09
Champions
Union Olimpija
15th title

== Relegation Playoffs ==
Pos	Team	P	W	L	F	A	Pts
1	Rudar Trbovlje	4	3	1	370	329	7
2	Epic Misel Postojna	4	2	2	322	328	6
3	Rogaška	4	1	3	301	334	5

P=Matches played, W=Matches won, L=Matches lost, F=Points for, A=Points against, Pts=Points

Qualified for 2009–10 Slovenian First Division

== Statistics leaders ==
=== Performance Index Rating ===
Pos	Player	Club	PIR
1	(Saint Vincent and the Grenadines) Shawn King	Hopsi Polzela	31.55
2	(United States) David Paris	Zagorje	19.43
3	(United States) Takais Brown	Alpos Šentjur	18.17

=== Points ===
Pos	Player	Club	PPG
1	(United States) Gilbert Goodrich	Zagorje	22.15
2	(Saint Vincent and the Grenadines) Shawn King	Hopsi Polzela	20.45
3	(Serbia) Dejan Delić	Geoplin Slovan	17.44

=== Rebounds ===
Pos	Player	Club	RPG
1	(Saint Vincent and the Grenadines) Shawn King	Hopsi Polzela	14.79
2	(United States) Joshua Johnson	Zagorje	11.21
3	(United States) David Paris	Zagorje	9.57

=== Assists ===
Pos	Player	Club	APG
1	(Slovenia) Jure Močnik	Helios Domžale	4.59
2	(United States) Gilbert Goodrich	Zagorje	4.07
3	(Slovenia) Saša Dončić	Geoplin Slovan	3.16
