= 1991–92 Slovenian Basketball League =

- League: Slovenian Basketball League
- Sport: Basketball
- Duration: 5 October 91 – 28 March 92
- TV partner: RTV Slovenija

Regular season
- Season champions: Smelt Olimpija

Playoffs
- Finals champions: Smelt Olimpija
- Runners-up: Optimizem Postojna

Slovenian Basketball League seasons
- 1992–93 →

The 1991–92 Slovenian Basketball League was the first season of the Premier A Slovenian Basketball League, the highest professional basketball league in Slovenia. The first half of the season consisted of 16 teams and 2 groups (14 games for each of the 16 teams) began on Saturday, 5 October 1991 and ended on 28 December 1991.

== Teams for the 1991–92 season ==
Team	City	Arena	1990–91 result
Smelt Olimpija	Ljubljana	Tivoli Hall	Yugoslav First League, 7th
Maribor '87	Maribor	Tabor Hall	Yugoslav 1. B League, 9th
Postojna	Postojna	CUI Sports Hall	Yugoslav 1. B League, 10th
Triglav	Kranj	Planina Sports Hall	Yugoslav 1. B League, 12th
Helios	Domžale	OŠ Vencelj Perko Hall	Republic League, 1st
Micom Marcus	Koper	Burja Sports Hall	Republic League, 2nd
Kronos Slovan	Ljubljana	Kodeljevo Hall	Republic League, 3rd
Ježica	Ljubljana	ŠRC Ježica	Republic League, 4th
Celje	Celje	Tehniški Center Hall	Republic League 5th
Tinex Medvode	Medvode	Oto Vrhunc Blaž Hall	Republic League, 6th
Mavrica Ilirija	Ljubljana	Ilirija Hall	Republic League, 7th
Elektra	Šoštanj	OŠ Šalek Hall	Republic League, 8th
Comet	Slovenske Konjice	Ob Dravinji Hall	Republic League, 9th
Rogaška Donat Mg	Rogaška Slatina	OŠ Rogaška Slatina	Republic League, 10th
Smelt Olimpija mladi	Ljubljana	Tivoli Hall	2. Republic League, 1st
Podbočje	Podbočje	OŠ Podbočje	2. Republic League, 2nd

== Green group ==
Pos	Team	P	W	L	F	A	Pts
1	Smelt Olimpija	14	13	1	1561	1101	27
2	Helios Domžale	14	9	5	1210	1172	23
3	Postojna	14	9	5	1199	1155	23
4	Micom Marcus Koper	14	8	6	1225	1239	22
5	Triglav Kranj	14	7	7	1203	1196	21
6	Kronos Slovan	14	6	8	1197	1231	20
7	Ježica	14	4	10	1014	1110	18
8	Maribor '87	14	0	14	1033	1438	14

P=Matches played, W=Matches won, L=Matches lost, F=Points for, A=Points against, Pts=Points

Qualified for the Green Group

== Red group ==
Pos	Team	P	W	L	F	A	Pts
1	Tinex Medvode	14	13	1	1175	997	27
2	Mavrica Ilirija	14	11	3	1259	1094	25
3	Rogaška Donat Mg	14	11	3	1145	1011	25
4	Podbočje	14	7	7	1093	1066	21
5	Elektra Šoštanj	14	7	7	1205	1129	21
6	Comet	14	5	9	1163	1156	19
7	Smelt Olimpija mladi	14	1	13	1090	1373	15
8	Celje	14	1	13	957	1261	15

P=Matches played, W=Matches won, L=Matches lost, F=Points for, A=Points against, Pts=Points

Qualified for the Green Group

== Green group final standings ==
Pos	Team	Total					
		P	W	L	F	A	Pts
1	Smelt Olimpija	14	14	0	1546	1016	28
2	Postojna	14	11	3	1169	1150	25
3	Helios Domžale	14	8	6	1254	1209	22
4	Triglav Kranj	14	6	8	1100	1132	20
5	Rogaška Donat Mg	14	5	9	1048	1207	19
6	Micom Marcus Koper	14	4	10	1193	1245	18
7	Tinex Medvode	14	4	10	1074	1240	18
8	Unicom Ilirija	14	4	10	1017	1202	18

P=Matches played, W=Matches won, L=Matches lost, F=Points for, A=Points against, Pts=Points

Qualified for the Playoff stage

== Red group final standings ==
Pos	Team	Total					
		P	W	L	F	A	Pts
1	Kronos Slovan	14	11	3	1299	1156	25
2	Comet	14	10	4	1147	1071	24
3	Ježica	14	10	4	1061	976	24
4	Elektra Šoštanj	14	8	6	1061	1071	22
5	Podbočje	14	7	7	1085	1098	21
6	Smelt Olimpija mladi	14	5	9	1169	1271	19
7	Maribor '87	14	4	10	1222	1193	18
8	Celje	14	1	13	1091	1299	14

P=Matches played, W=Matches won, L=Matches lost, F=Points for, A=Points against, Pts=Points

Relegated

== Playoffs ==
Semi-finals
1	Smelt Olimpija	2
4	Triglav Kranj	0
2	Optimizem Postojna	2
3	Helios Domžale	1

Final
1	Smelt Olimpija	3
2	Optimizem Postojna	0

Slovenian League 1991–92
Champions

Smelt Olimpija
1st title
