= Dušan Hauptman =

Slovenian basketball player

Personal information
- Born: 17 September 1960 (age 66) Ljubljana, SFR Yugoslavia
- Listed height: 6 ft 1 in (1.85 m)

Career information
- Playing career: 1978–1998
- Position: Shooting guard

Career history

Playing
- 1978–1982: Libela Celje
- 1982–1998: Smelt Olimpija

Coaching
- 2000–2004: Union Olimpija (youth teams)
- 2004–2005: Koper
- 2005–2006: Elektra Šoštanj
- 2006–2009: Zagorje
- 2010–2011: Elektra Šoštanj

Career highlights
- 2x Yugoslav 1. B champion (1985, 1987); 7x Slovenian League champion (1992–1998); 6x Slovenian Cup winner (1992–1995, 1997, 1998); FIBA Saporta Cup winner (1994)

Dušan Hauptman (born 17 September 1960) is a Slovenian former professional basketball player who played as a shooting guard.

== Career ==
Between 1982 and 1998, Hauptman spent seventeen consecutive seasons with Smelt Olimpija. With Olimpija, he managed to win the 1993–94 FIBA European Cup, and also finished third in the 1997 FIBA Euroleague Final Four.

Hauptman was a member of the Slovenian national team, with whom he played at the EuroBasket 1995 in Greece.
