= 1992–93 FIBA Korać Cup =

- League: FIBA Korać Cup
- Sport: Basketball

Finals
- Champions: (Italy) Philips Milano
- Runners-up: (Italy) Virtus Roma

FIBA Korać Cup seasons
- ← 1991–92 1993–94 →

The 1992–93 FIBA Korać Cup was the 22nd edition of FIBA's Korać Cup basketball competition. The Italian Philips Milano defeated the Italian Virtus Roma in the final. This was the second consecutive year in which the final two teams were both Italian and the third consecutive Italian victory. It was Philips Milano's second time winning the title following a victory in 1985 playing as Simac Milano.

Federal Republic of Yugoslavia's entrants were unable to participate due to the UN economic sanctions.

== Team allocation ==
- 1st, 2nd, 3rd, etc.: League position after Playoffs of the previous season shown in parentheses
- TH: Title holder

Second round
(Germany) Alba Berlin (2nd)	(Spain) FCB Banca Catalana (7th)	(France) ASVEL (8th)	(Poland) Stal Bobrek Bytom (3rd)
(Germany) EnBW Ludwigsburg (3rd)	(Spain) Grupo Libro Valladolid (8th)	(Israel) Maccabi Rishon LeZion (3rd)	(Poland) Lech Poznań (4th)
(Germany) SSV Ulm (7th)	(Federal Republic of Yugoslavia) ~~Užice~~ (7th)	(Israel) Hapoel Jerusalem (5th)	(Ukraine) Spartak Lugansk (3rd)
(Germany) TVG Trier (8th)	(Federal Republic of Yugoslavia) ~~Vojvodina~~ (8th)	(Israel) Maccabi Haifa (7th)	(Ukraine) Stroitel' Kharkov (5th)
(Greece) Fyrogenis AEK (4th)	(Federal Republic of Yugoslavia) ~~Radnički Belgrade~~ (9th)	(Romania) Balanța Sibiu	(Finland) Saab UU
(Greece) Chipita Panionios (5th)	(Federal Republic of Yugoslavia) ~~Budućnost~~ (10th)	(Romania) Politehnica Timișoara	(Hungary) Körmendi Dózsa (2nd)
(Greece) Replay Iraklis (6th)	(Belgium) Basket Brussels	(Romania) SOCED București	(Latvia) VEF Adazhi Interlatvia Rīga
(Greece) Nikas Peristeri (7th)	(Belgium) Go Pass Verviers-Pepinster	(Turkey) ~~Çukurova Üniversitesi~~ (4th)	(Lithuania) Statyba
(Italy) Virtus Roma (4th)^{TH}	(Belgium) Sunair Oostende	(Turkey) TED Ankara Kolejliler (5th)	(Luxembourg) Amicale Steinsel
(Italy) Philips Milano (5th)	(Czechoslovakia) Nová huť ANES Ostrava (6th)	(Turkey) Tofaş (6th)	(Russia) Avtodorozhnik (8th)
(Italy) Shampoo Clear Cantù (6th)	(Czechoslovakia) Sparta Praha (7th)	(Croatia) Zagreb (4th)	(Slovenia) Micom Marcus Koper (6th)
(Italy) Phonola Caserta (8th)	(Czechoslovakia) TTS Trenčín (8th)	(Croatia) Šibenik Zagreb-Montaža (5th)	(Switzerland) Ideal Job Union Neuchatel
(Spain) Taugrés (4th)	(France) Gravelines (4th)	(Cyprus) APOEL	
(Spain) Elosúa Leon (6th)	(France) Olympique Antibes (5th)	(Cyprus) Keravnos	
First round
(Slovenia) Optimizem Postojna (2nd)	(Georgia (country)) Merani Tbilisi	(France) Jet CRO Lyon (6th)	(Romania) Steaua București
(Slovenia) Helios Domžale (3rd)	(Georgia (country)) Shevardeni	(Hungary) MOL Szolnoki Olajbányász (5th)	(Switzerland) Fidefinanz Bellinzona
(Slovenia) Slovan (9th)	(Armenia) Urartu	(Iceland) Valur	(Turkey) Fenerbahçe (3rd)
(Bulgaria) Akademik Varna	(Belgium) Spirou Charleroi	(Luxembourg) Union Sportive Hiefenech	
(Bulgaria) ~~Spartak Pleven~~	(Czechoslovakia) Baník Cígeľ Prievidza (2nd)	(Portugal) CR Estrelas da Avenida	

== First round ==
Team 1	Agg.	Team 2	1st leg	2nd leg
Fenerbahçe (Turkey)	211–146	(Georgia (country)) Merani Tbilisi	108–78	103–68
Union Sportive Hiefenech (Luxembourg)	145–203	(Slovenia) Helios Domžale	77–108	68–95
Steaua București (Romania)	125–159	(Slovenia) Optimizem Postojna	66–81	59–78
Urartu (Armenia)	4–0*	(Bulgaria) Spartak Pleven	2–0	2–0
Jet CRO Lyon (France)	237–162	(Iceland) Valur	109–74	128–88
Shevardeni (Georgia (country))	130–219	(Hungary) MOL Szolnoki Olajbányász	65–118	65–101
Fidefinanz Bellinzona (Switzerland)	198–182	(Slovenia) Slovan	107–92	91–90
Estrelas de Avenida (Portugal)	130–183	(Belgium) Spirou Charleroi	68–84	62–99
Baník Cígeľ Prievidza (Czechoslovakia)	222–185	(Bulgaria) Akademik Varna	131–89	91–96

*Spartak Pleven withdrew before the first leg and Urartu received a forfeit (2–0) in both games.

== Second round ==
Team 1	Agg.	Team 2	1st leg	2nd leg
Fenerbahçe (Turkey)	222–123	(Romania) Politehnica Timișoara	126–62	96–61
Micom Marcus Koper (Slovenia)	142–189	(Israel) Maccabi Rishon LeZion	69–89	73–100
Helios Domžale (Slovenia)	140–156	(Russia) Avtodorozhnik	55–69	85–87
SOCED București (Romania)	103–224	(Italy) Phonola Caserta	47–108	56–116
Optimizem Postojna (Slovenia)	155–152	(Germany) TVG Trier	84–80	71–72
Amicale Steinsel (Luxembourg)	137–209	(Italy) Shampoo Clear Cantù	65–104	72–105
Šibenik ZM (Croatia)	173–130	(Armenia) Urartu	89–62	84–68
Basket Brussels (Belgium)	142–196	(Italy) Philips Milano	67–97	75–99
Jet CRO Lyon (France)	169–175	(Germany) EnBW Ludwigsburg	93–96	76–79
Budućnost (Federal Republic of Yugoslavia)	0–4*	(Belgium) Sunair Oostende	0–2	0–2
TTS Trenčín (Czechoslovakia)	153–184	(Poland) Stal Bobrek Bytom	83–96	70–88
Balanța Sibiu (Romania)	134–242	(Spain) FC Barcelona Banca Catalana	59–127	75–115
MOL Szolnoki Olajbányász (Hungary)	4–0*	(Federal Republic of Yugoslavia) Užice	2–0	2–0
Çukurova Üniversitesi (Turkey)	0–4*	(France) Olympique Antibes	0–2	0–2
Fidefinanz Bellinzona (Switzerland)	160–167	(Spain) Elosúa León	86–78	74–89
Lech Poznań (Poland)	132–134	(Germany) Alba Berlin	72–70	60–64
Spirou Charleroi (Belgium)	151–147	(France) ASVEL	85–69	66–78
Tofaş (Turkey)	171–159	(Spain) Grupo Libro Valladolid	93–71	78–88
Go Pass Verviers-Pepinster (Belgium)	198–178	(Germany) SSV Ulm	106–82	92–96
Baník Cígeľ Prievidza (Czechoslovakia)	185–230	(Spain) Taugrés	93–119	92–111
Radnički Belgrade (Federal Republic of Yugoslavia)	0–4*	(Ukraine) Stroitel' Kharkov	0–2	0–2
APOEL (Cyprus)	176–214	(Greece) Nikas Peristeri	93–98	83–116
Statyba (Lithuania)	115–163	(Croatia) Zagreb	48–78	67–85
TED Ankara Kolejliler (Turkey)	182–157	(Israel) Hapoel Jerusalem	80–74	102–83
Spartak Lugansk (Ukraine)	177–174	(Finland) Saab UU	96–91	81–83
Ideal Job Union Neuchâtel (Switzerland)	157–204	(Italy) Virtus Roma	80–107	77–97
Nová huť ANES Ostrava (Czechoslovakia)	4–0*	(Federal Republic of Yugoslavia) Vojvodina	2–0	2–0
Levski Sofia (Bulgaria)	139–162	(Greece) Chipita Panionios	67–70	72–92
Maccabi Haifa (Israel)	146–171	(France) Gravelines	86–90	60–81
Sparta Praha (Czechoslovakia)	162–186	(Greece) Fyrogenis AEK	82–91	80–95
VEF Adazhi Interlatvia Rīga (Latvia)	152–151	(Hungary) Körmendi Dózsa	85–65	67–86
Keravnos (Cyprus)	165–212	(Greece) Replay Iraklis	85–96	80–116

*Budućnost, Užice, Vojvodina, and Radnički Belgrade were banned from competing due to international sanctions on FR Yugoslavia; their rivals received a forfeit (2–0) in both games.
*Çukurova Üniversitesi withdrew before the first leg and their rivals received a forfeit (2–0) in both games.

== Third round ==
Team 1	Agg.	Team 2	1st leg	2nd leg
Fenerbahçe (Turkey)	165–154	(Israel) Maccabi Rishon LeZion	86–76	79–78
Avtodorozhnik (Russia)	163–171	(Italy) Phonola Caserta	84–84	79–87
Optimizem Postojna (Slovenia)	166–188	(Italy) Shampoo Clear Cantù	78–90	88–98
Šibenik ZM (Croatia)	177–198	(Italy) Philips Milano	80–85	97–113
EnBW Ludwigsburg (Germany)	160–164	(Belgium) Sunair Oostende	88–82	72–82
FC Barcelona Banca Catalana (Spain)	172–136	(Poland) Stal Bobrek Bytom	88–66	84–70
MOL Szolnoki Olajbányász (Hungary)	155–204	(France) Olympique Antibes	80–87	75–117
Elosúa León (Spain)	180–139	(Germany) Alba Berlin	91–51	89–88
Spirou Charleroi (Belgium)	147–128	(Turkey) Tofaş	86–64	61–64
Go Pass Verviers-Pepinster (Belgium)	171–199	(Spain) Taugrés	94–104	77–95
Stroitel' Kharkov (Ukraine)	160–252	(Greece) Nikas Peristeri	99–121	61–131
Zagreb (Croatia)	132–131	(Turkey) TED Ankara Kolejliler	75–68	57–63
Spartak Lugansk (Ukraine)	138–167	(Italy) Virtus Roma	72–73	66–94
Nová huť ANES Ostrava (Czechoslovakia)	137–163	(Greece) Chipita Panionios	62–82	75–81
Gravelines (France)	161–146	(Greece) Fyrogenis AEK	91–61	70–85
VEF Adazhi Interlatvia Rīga (Latvia)	147–191	(Greece) Replay Iraklis	83–109	64–82

== Round of 16 ==
Key to colors
Top two places in each group advance to quarterfinals

=== Group A ===
Pos	Team	Pld	W	L	PF	PA	PD	Pts	CAN	ZAG	FEN	SPI
1	(Italy) Shampoo Clear Cantù	6	4	2	506	462	+44	10	—	100–74	97–80	80–70
2	(Croatia) Zagreb	6	3	3	473	495	−22	9	87–83	—	83–66	75–73
3	(Turkey) Fenerbahçe	6	3	3	446	456	−10	9	73–62	77–64	—	75–70
4	(Belgium) Spirou Charleroi	6	2	4	467	479	−12	8	78–84	96–90	80–75	—

Source: FIBA Europe

=== Group B ===
Pos	Team	Pld	W	L	PF	PA	PD	Pts	FCB	CAS	IRA	OOS
1	(Spain) FC Barcelona Banca Catalana	6	5	1	529	462	+67	11	—	85–77	101–74	88–68
2	(Italy) Phonola Caserta	6	3	3	519	511	+8	9	88–82	—	101–87	98–89
3	(Greece) Replay Iraklis	6	3	3	485	527	−42	9	70–84	93–88	—	79–76
4	(Belgium) Sunair Oostende	6	1	5	470	503	−33	7	85–89	75–67	77–82	—

Source: FIBA Europe

=== Group C ===
Pos	Team	Pld	W	L	PF	PA	PD	Pts	ROM	PAN	OAN	TAU
1	(Italy) Virtus Roma	6	4	2	475	476	−1	10	—	85–97	97–94	88–76
2	(Greece) Chipita Panionios	6	3	3	484	442	+42	9	65–67	—	101–87	79–56
3	(France) Olympique Antibes	6	3	3	526	530	−4	9	82–70	71–68	—	97–89
4	(Spain) Taugrés	6	2	4	464	501	−37	8	62–68	76–74	105–96	—

Source: FIBA Europe

=== Group D ===
Pos	Team	Pld	W	L	PF	PA	PD	Pts	MIL	LEON	PER	GRA
1	(Italy) Philips Milano	6	5	1	522	464	+58	11	—	86–84	89–78	104–79
2	(Spain) Elosúa León	6	3	3	494	467	+27	9	77–75	—	100–64	74–80
3	(Greece) Nikas Peristeri	6	2	4	464	510	−46	8	78–90	84–75	—	87–78
4	(France) Gravelines	6	2	4	461	500	−39	8	68–78	78–84	78–73	—

Source: FIBA Europe

== Quarterfinals ==
Team 1	Agg.	Team 2	1st leg	2nd leg
Zagreb (Croatia)	160–167	(Spain) FC Barcelona Banca Catalana	81–94	79–73
Phonola Caserta (Italy)	150–181	(Italy) Shampoo Clear Cantù	81–86	69–95
Chipita Panionios (Greece)	152–160	(Italy) Philips Milano	78–79	74–81
Elosúa León (Spain)	173–180	(Italy) Virtus Roma	88–77	85–103

== Semifinals ==
Team 1	Agg.	Team 2	1st leg	2nd leg
FC Barcelona Banca Catalana (Spain)	149–163	(Italy) Virtus Roma	64–84	85–79
Shampoo Clear Cantù (Italy)	146–157	(Italy) Philips Milano	74–72	72–85

== Finals ==
Team 1	Agg.	Team 2	1st leg	2nd leg
Virtus Roma (Italy)	181–201	(Italy) Philips Milano	90–95	91–106

== Rosters ==
(Italy) Philips Milano: Aleksandar Đorđević, Riccardo Pittis (C), Antonello Riva, Davide Pessina, Antonio Davis; Marco Baldi, Flavio Portaluppi, Marco Sambugaro, Paolo Alberti. Coach: Mike D'Antoni
(Italy) Virtus Roma: Alessandro Fantozzi (C), Andrea Niccolai, Sandro Dell'Agnello, Dino Radja, Elvis Rolle; Emiliano Busca, Roberto Premier, Gustavo Tolotti, Davide Croce. Coach: Franco Casalini

1992–93 FIBA Korać Cup Champions

Philips Milano
2nd title
