= 1992–93 Slovenian Basketball League =

- League: Slovenian Basketball League
- Sport: Basketball
- Duration: 5 October 92 – 20 February 93
- TV partner: RTV Slovenija

Regular season
- Season champions: Maricom Miklavž

Playoffs
- Finals champions: Smelt Olimpija
- Runners-up: Slovenica Koper

Slovenian Basketball League seasons
- ← 1991–92 1993–94 →

The 1992–93 Slovenian Basketball League was the second season of the Premier A Slovenian Basketball League, the highest professional basketball league in Slovenia. The first half of the season consisted of 16 teams and 2 groups (members of SBA league were absent) began on Saturday, 5 October 1992 and ended on 2 December 1992.

== Green group ==
Pos	Team	P	W	L	F	A	Pts
1	Micom Marcus Koper	14	11	3	1225	1127	25
2	Tinex Norik Medvode	14	10	4	1248	1176	24
3	Comet	14	10	4	1203	1144	24
4	Litostroj Slovan	14	8	6	1138	1179	22
5	Rogaška Donat Mg	14	7	7	1238	1204	21
6	Ilirija	14	5	9	1166	1198	19
7	Ježica	14	5	9	1103	1122	19
8	ESO Elektra Šoštanj	14	0	14	1012	1189	14

P=Matches played, W=Matches won, L=Matches lost, F=Points for, A=Points against, Pts=Points

Qualified for the Green Group

== Red group ==
Pos	Team	P	W	L	F	A	Pts
1	Maricom Miklavž	14	14	0	1473	1132	28
2	Satex Maribor	14	10	4	1223	1145	24
3	Idrija	14	8	6	1174	1165	22
4	Kokra Lipje	14	8	6	1093	1135	21
5	Savinjska Polzela	14	6	8	1064	1102	20
6	Inpos Celje	14	5	9	1003	1178	19
7	Podbočje	14	3	11	1124	1180	17
8	Smelt Olimpija mladi	14	2	12	1144	1261	16

P=Matches played, W=Matches won, L=Matches lost, F=Points for, A=Points against, Pts=Points

Qualified for the Green Group

== Green group final standings ==
Pos	Team	Total					
		P	W	L	F	A	Pts
1	Maricom Miklavž	14	12	2	1439	1207	26
2	Slovenica Koper	14	10	4	1319	1213	24
3	Rogaška Donat Mg	14	8	6	1172	1161	22
4	Tinex Norik Medvode	14	7	7	1254	1254	21
5	Litostroj Slovan	14	6	8	1161	1181	20
6	Comet	14	5	9	1203	1264	19
7	KM Ilirija	14	4	10	1136	1323	18
8	Satex Maribor	14	4	10	1239	1320	18

P=Matches played, W=Matches won, L=Matches lost, F=Points for, A=Points against, Pts=Points

Qualified for the Playoff stage

== Red group final standings ==
Pos	Team	Total					
		P	W	L	F	A	Pts
1	Savinjska Polzela	14	13	1	1234	1048	27
2	Ježica	14	9	5	1059	950	23
3	Idrija	14	8	6	1186	1128	22
4	Kokra Lipje	14	7	7	1083	1035	21
5	Smelt Olimpija mladi	14	6	8	1041	1071	20
6	Podbočje	14	6	8	1056	1151	20
7	ESO Elektra Šoštanj	14	5	9	1041	1146	19
8	Inpos Celje	14	2	12	1015	1186	16

P=Matches played, W=Matches won, L=Matches lost, F=Points for, A=Points against, Pts=Points

Relegated

== Playoffs ==
Quarterfinals
S1	Smelt Olimpija	3
4	Tinex Norik Medvode	0
1	Maricom Miklavž	3
S4	Triglav Kranj	0
S2	Optimizem Postojna	3
3	Rogaška Donat Mg	1
2	Slovenica Koper	3
S3	Helios Domžale	1

Semifinals
S1	Smelt Olimpija	3
1	Maricom Miklavž	0
S2	Optimizem Postojna	0
2	Slovenica Koper	3

Finals
S1	Smelt Olimpija	3
2	Slovenica Koper	1

Slovenian League 1992–93
Champions

Smelt Olimpija
2nd title
