= 1993–94 FIBA Korać Cup =

- League: FIBA Korać Cup
- Sport: Basketball

Finals
- Champions: (Greece) PAOK Bravo
- Runners-up: (Italy) Stefanel Trieste

FIBA Korać Cup seasons
- ← 1992–93 1994–95 →

The 1993–94 FIBA Korać Cup season occurred between September 8, 1993, and March 16, 1994.

The competition was won by PAOK Bravo in a two-legged final against the Italian League club Stefanel Trieste. PAOK won both at home and away, by 9 points. It has been the club's second European title, after previously winning the 1990–91 FIBA European Cup Winners' Cup.

Recoaro Milano, the defending champions, were eliminated in the semi-finals by Stefanel Trieste.

Federal Republic of Yugoslavia's entrants were unable to participate for the second season in a row due to the UN economic sanctions.

After the 1993 dissolution of Czechoslovakia, Czech Republic and Slovakia had 4 representative clubs in the competition each.

This was the only season (and basketball international tournament overall) played by a team from Wales. Also, this was the debut season in international basketball club competition for Moldova.

== Competition system ==
77 teams, best qualified clubs in their domestic leagues, not participating in FIBA Europe League and FIBA European Cup (and applied for this competition), played knock-out rounds on a home and away basis. The sixteen teams qualified after the 1/16 final round (third round) entered the 1/8 final Group stage divided into four groups of four playing a round-robin. In case of a tie between teams in this stage one to one games and average points were taken into consideration. The two best placed teams from the groups formed quarterfinal knockout round (x pairings with home and away games). Winners advanced to the semifinals and after that the finals (also with the home and away games).

== Team allocation ==
A total of 77 teams participated in this season competition (36 teams entered the first qualifying round, another 36 teams started from the second qualifying round and 5 teams (Recoaro Milano, Scavolini Pesaro, PAOK Bravo, Maccabi Tel Aviv, Estudiantes Argentaria) received a bye to the third qualifying round.

The labels in the parentheses show how each team qualified for the place of its starting round:

- 1st, 2nd, 3rd, etc.: League position after Playoffs
- TH: Title holder
- CW: Cup Winner

Third round
(Italy) Scavolini Pesaro (3rd)	(Greece) PAOK Bravo (3rd)	(Israel) Maccabi Elite Tel Aviv (4th)	(Spain) Estudiantes Argentaria (4th)
(Italy) Recoaro Milano (5th)^{TH}			
Second round
(France) Olympique Antibes (3rd)	(Israel) Hapoel Herzliya (6th)	(Ukraine) Spartak Lugansk (4th)	(Austria) UKJ Mollersdorf Traiskirchen (4th)
(France) Gravelines (4th)	(Russia) Avtodorozhnik (3rd)	(Greece) Chipita Panionios (4th)	(Croatia) Zagreb (3rd)
(France) PSG Racing Basket (6th)	(Russia) Stroitel Samara (4th)	(Greece) Nikas Peristeri (6th)	(Cyprus) Pezoporikos Larnaca (2nd)
(France) JDA Dijon (CW)	(Russia) Dynamo Moscow (5th)	(Hungary) MOL Szolnoki Olaj (2nd)	(Iceland) Haukar (1st)
(Belgium) Kessel-Lo Leuven (2nd)	(Spain) Caja San Fernanado (5th)	(Hungary) ZTE (3rd)	(Latvia) VEF Adazhi Riga
(Belgium) Spirou Charleroi (3rd)	(Spain) Elmar Leon (6th)	(Italy) Stefanel Trieste (6th)	(Poland) Lech Poznan (8th)
(Belgium) Sunair Oostende (6th)	(Spain) NatWest Zaragoza (7th)	(Italy) Pfizer Reggio Calabria (7th)	(Portugal) Clube Povo de Esgueira
(Israel) Hapoel Jerusalem (3rd)	(Ukraine) CSKA Kyiv (2nd)	(Turkey) Fenerbahce (2nd)	(Slovenia) Helios Domžale (5th)
(Israel) Hapoel Eilat (5th)	(Ukraine) Korabel' Nikolaev (3rd)	(Turkey) Ulker Genclik (4th)	(Switzerland) Union Neuchatel
First round
(Czech Republic) Sparta Prague (2nd)	(North Macedonia) Makedonija '91 Strumica	(Croatia) Slavonska Banka Osijek (7th)	(Cyprus) Keravnos (5th)
(Czech Republic) Nová hut' Ostrava (4th)	(North Macedonia) Nemetali Ogražden	(Slovenia) Slovenica Koper (2nd)	(Greece) AEK (7th)
(Czech Republic) Tonak Novy Jicin (5th)	(North Macedonia) Alumina Skopje	(Slovenia) TAM Bus Miklavž (3rd)	(Hungary) Kaposvári (6th)
(Czech Republic) BHC SKP Pardubice (7th)	(Slovakia) Banik Cigel Prievidza (5th)	(Sweden) Plannja Basket (6th)	(Luxembourg) Union Sportive Hiefenech
(Germany) TTL Bamberg (2nd)	(Slovakia) Slavia Košice (6th)	(Sweden) Karcher Hisings-Karra (7th)	(Moldova) Zorile
(Germany) SSV Ulm (3rd)	(Slovakia) Banik Handlova (7th)	(Turkey) TED Ankara Kolejliler (3rd)	(Romania) CSU Forest Sibiu
(Germany) BG Ludwigsburg (4th)	(Slovakia) Inter Slovnaft (9th)	(Turkey) Galatasaray (6th)	(Switzerland) VF Lugano
(Germany) Alba Berlin (5th)	(Croatia) Šibenik Zagreb-Montaža (4th)	(Austria) Volksbank Swans Gmunden (3rd)	(Ukraine) TIIT Kharkov (5th)
(North Macedonia) MZT Skopje (2nd)	(Croatia) Zrinjevac (6th)	(Belgium) Bobcat Gent (7th)	(Wales) Cardiff Bay Heat

== First round ==
Team 1	Agg.	Team 2	1st leg	2nd leg
TTL Bamberg (Germany)	164–169	(Slovenia) TAM Bus Miklavž	95–78	69–91
Sparta Prague (Czech Republic)	199–137	(Switzerland) VF Lugano	101–66	98–71
Kärcher Hisings-Kärra (Sweden)	184–193	(Germany) Alba Berlin	106–93	78–100
Nemetali Ograzden (North Macedonia)	135–176	(Turkey) TED Ankara Kolejliler	59–67	76–109
Baník Cígeľ Prievidza (Slovakia)	162–166	(Turkey) Galatasaray	89–75	73–91
Makedonija '91 Strumica (North Macedonia)	165–178	(Ukraine) TIIT Kharkov	97–75	68–103
Alumina (North Macedonia)	134–165	(Czech Republic) Tonak Nový Jičín	61–80	73–85
Slovenica Koper (Slovenia)	159–139	(Slovakia) Baník Handlová	79–63	80–76
Keravnos (Cyprus)	127–199	(Greece) AEK	73–106	54–93
Inter Slovnaft (Slovakia)	165–176	(Croatia) Zrinjevac	75–88	90–88
Volksbank Swans Gmunden (Austria)	141–157	(Belgium) Bobcat Gent	75–89	66–68
Zorile (Moldova)	128–203	(Slovakia) Slávia Košice	61–96	67–107
Forest Sibiu (Romania)	154–192	(Croatia) Slavonska Banka Osijek	66–108	88–84
Kaposvári (Hungary)	168–186	(Czech Republic) Nová huť Ostrava	94–79	74–107
MZT Aerodrom (North Macedonia)	193–178	(Czech Republic) BHC SKP Pardubice	111–81	82–97
Ulm (Germany)	176–162	(Sweden) Plannja	92–72	84–90
Cardiff Bay Heat (Wales)	151–167	(Luxembourg) Union Sportive Hiefenech	79–89	72–78
Šibenik Zagreb Montaža (Croatia)	169–170	(Germany) Ludwigsburg	90–88	79–82

== Second round ==
Team 1	Agg.	Team 2	1st leg	2nd leg
CSK Kyiv (Ukraine)	160–189	(Israel) Hapoel Herzliya	81–88	79–101
Povo de Esgueira (Portugal)	143–171	(Spain) Caja San Fernando	74–95	69–76
Haukar (Iceland)	148–208	(France) JDA Dijon	83–90	65–118
TAM Bus Miklavž (Slovenia)	146–203	(Italy) Pfizer Reggio Calabria	84–96	62–107
ZTE (Hungary)	146–172	(France) PSG Racing	78–96	68–76
Spirou (Belgium)	159–168	(Greece) Nikas Peristeri	82–80	77–88
Nikolaev (Ukraine)	170–184	(Russia) Dynamo Moscow	83–81	87–103
Union Neuchâtel (Switzerland)	124–184	(Italy) Stefanel Trieste	57–97	67–87
Helios Suns (Slovenia)	162–173	(Belgium) Kessel-Lo Leuven	84–84	78–89
Sparta Prague (Czech Republic)	152–182	(Turkey) Fenerbahçe	96–87	56–95
Spartak Lugansk (Ukraine)	0–40*	(Germany) Alba Berlin	0–20	0–20
TED Ankara Kolejliler (Turkey)	163–147	(Belgium) Sunair Oostende	72–76	91–71
Galatasaray (Turkey)	127–162	(Spain) NatWest Zaragoza	75–69	52–93
TIIT Kharkov (Ukraine)	40–0**	(France) Gravelines	20–0	20–0
Avtodor Saratov (Russia)	131–162	(Turkey) Ülker	68–72	63–90
Szolnoki Olaj (Hungary)	91–162	(Croatia) Zagreb	61–61	30–101
VEF Rīga (Latvia)	165–172	(Poland) Lech Poznań	91–85	74–87
Tonak Nový Jičín (Czech Republic)	154–193	(France) Olympique Antibes	79–96	75–97
Pezoporikos Larnaca (Cyprus)	151–145	(Israel) Hapoel Eilat	86–80	65–65
Slovenica Koper (Slovenia)	165–195	(Greece) Chipita Panionios	73–91	92–104
Hapoel Jerusalem (Israel)	140–133	(Greece) AEK	88–60	52–73
Möllersdorf Traiskirchen (Austria)	123–186	(Spain) Elmar León	79–87	44–99
Zrinjevac (Croatia)	165–168	(Belgium) Bobcat Gent	77–75	88–93
Slávia Košice (Slovakia)	174–146	(Croatia) Slavonska Banka Osijek	91–66	83–80
Nová huť Ostrava (Czech Republic)	70–121	(Russia) Stroitel Samara	70–101	0–20***
MZT Aerodrom (North Macedonia)	145–163	(Germany) Ulm	75–78	70–85
Union Sportive Hiefenech (Luxembourg)	149–191	(Germany) Ludwigsburg	80–86	69–105

* & ** Spartak Lugansk and Gravelines withdrew before the first leg and their rivals received a forfeit (20–0) in both games.

*** Nová huť Ostrava didn't travel to Russia to play the second leg and Stroitel Samara received a forfeit (20–0) in this game.

== Third round ==
Team 1	Agg.	Team 2	1st leg	2nd leg
Hapoel Herzliya (Israel)	146–186	(Spain) Caja San Fernando	79–87	67–99
JDA Dijon (France)	164–175	(Italy) Pfizer Reggio Calabria	87–86	77–89
PSG Racing (France)	168–193	(Greece) Nikas Peristeri	85–95	83–98
Dynamo Moscow (Russia)	175–196	(Italy) Stefanel Trieste	81–97	94–99
Kessel-Lo Leuven (Belgium)	173–189	(Turkey) Fenerbahçe	85–91	88–98
Alba Berlin (Germany)	159–144	(Turkey) TED Ankara Kolejliler	89–66	70–78
NatWest Zaragoza (Spain)	216–189	(Ukraine) TIIT Kharkov	106–77	110–112
Ülker (Turkey)	121–124	(Croatia) Zagreb	66–69	55–55
Lech Poznań (Poland)	154–222	(France) Olympique Antibes	93–104	61–118
Pezoporikos Larnaca (Cyprus)	148–185	(Greece) Chipita Panionios	69–86	79–99
Hapoel Jerusalem (Israel)	160–175	(Spain) Elmar León	81–77	79–98
Bobcat Gent (Belgium)	129–185	(Italy) Recoaro Milano	65–86	64–99
Slávia Košice (Slovakia)	114–168	(Italy) Scavolini Pesaro	59–82	55–86
Stroitel Samara (Russia)	133–182	(Greece) PAOK Bravo	77–81	56–101
Ulm (Germany)	145–206	(Israel) Maccabi Tel Aviv	72–86	73–120
Ludwigsburg (Germany)	156–192	(Spain) Estudiantes Argentaria	88–85	68–107

== Regular season ==
Key to colors
Top two places in each group advance to quarterfinals

=== Group A ===
Pos	Team	Pld	W	L	PF	PA	PD	Pts	TRI	PAN	FEN	ZAR
1	(Italy) Stefanel Trieste	6	5	1	485	463	+22	11	—	94–79	87–79	89–83
2	(Greece) Chipita Panionios	6	4	2	499	480	+19	10	74–58	—	86–71	95–81
3	(Turkey) Fenerbahçe	6	3	3	479	484	−5	9	80–81	102–87	—	65–62
4	(Spain) NatWest Zaragoza	6	0	6	449	485	−36	6	68–76	74–78	81–82	—

Source: FIBA Europe

=== Group B ===
Pos	Team	Pld	W	L	PF	PA	PD	Pts	MTA	PER	EST	RCA
1	(Israel) Maccabi Tel Aviv	6	5	1	475	422	+53	11	—	103–83	74–71	81–55
2	(Greece) Nikas Peristeri	6	3	3	487	469	+18	9	60–70	—	86–75	82–70
3	(Spain) Estudiantes Argentaria	6	3	3	490	482	+8	9	82–72	72–98	—	93–71
4	(Italy) Pfizer Reggio Calabria	6	1	5	427	506	−79	7	71–75	79–78	81–97	—

Source: FIBA Europe

=== Group C ===
Pos	Team	Pld	W	L	PF	PA	PD	Pts	PAOK	MIL	ZAG	CSF
1	(Greece) PAOK Bravo	6	5	1	499	461	+38	11	—	71–67	84–70	92–89
2	(Italy) Recoaro Milano	6	4	2	519	459	+60	10	76–74	—	78–84	108–82
3	(Croatia) Zagreb	6	3	3	460	510	−50	9	77–91	63–93	—	82–81
4	(Spain) Caja San Fernando	6	0	6	502	550	−48	6	82–87	85–97	83–84	—

Source: FIBA Europe

=== Group D ===
Pos	Team	Pld	W	L	PF	PA	PD	Pts	OAN	SCA	LEON	ALBA
1	(France) Olympique Antibes	6	4	2	530	504	+26	10	—	80–82	89–77	94–84
2	(Italy) Scavolini Pesaro	6	4	2	518	485	+33	10	94–99	—	93–84	78–66
3	(Spain) Elmar León	6	3	3	512	526	−14	9	93–85	82–80	—	87–82
4	(Germany) Alba Berlin	6	1	5	477	522	−45	7	74–83	74–91	97–89	—

Source: FIBA Europe

== Quarterfinals ==
Team 1	Agg.	Team 2	1st leg	2nd leg
Chipita Panionios (Greece)	169–146	(Israel) Maccabi Tel Aviv	92–72	77–74
Nikas Peristeri (Greece)	165–197	(Italy) Stefanel Trieste	80–88	85–109
Recoaro Milano (Italy)	186–180	(France) Olympique Antibes	98–85	88–95
Scavolini Pesaro (Italy)	140–162	(Greece) PAOK Bravo	82–66	58–96

== Semifinals ==
Team 1	Agg.	Team 2	1st leg	2nd leg
Chipita Panionios (Greece)	147–167	(Greece) PAOK Bravo	83–85	64–82
Stefanel Trieste (Italy)	192–182	(Italy) Recoaro Milano	96–79	96–103

== Finals ==
Team 1	Agg.	Team 2	1st leg	2nd leg
PAOK Bravo (Greece)	175–157	(Italy) Stefanel Trieste	75–66	100–91

== Rosters ==
(Greece) PAOK: John Korfas, Branislav Prelevic (C), Nasos Galakteros, Walter Berry, Zoran Savic; Nikos Boudouris, Georgios Balogiannis, Achilleas Mamatziolas, Efthimios Rentzias, Christos Tsekos. Coach: Soulis Markopoulos
(Italy) Stefanel Trieste: Ferdinando Gentile (C), Dejan Bodiroga, Gregor Fucka, Giuseppe Calavita, Lemone Lampley; Davide Cantarello, Alessandro De Pol, Claudio Pilutti, Claudio Pol Bodetto. Coach: Bogdan Tanjević

1993–94 FIBA Korać Cup Champions

PAOK Bravo
1st title

== See also ==
- 1993–94 FIBA European League
- 1993–94 FIBA European Cup
