= Aleksandar Džikić =

Serbian basketball coach

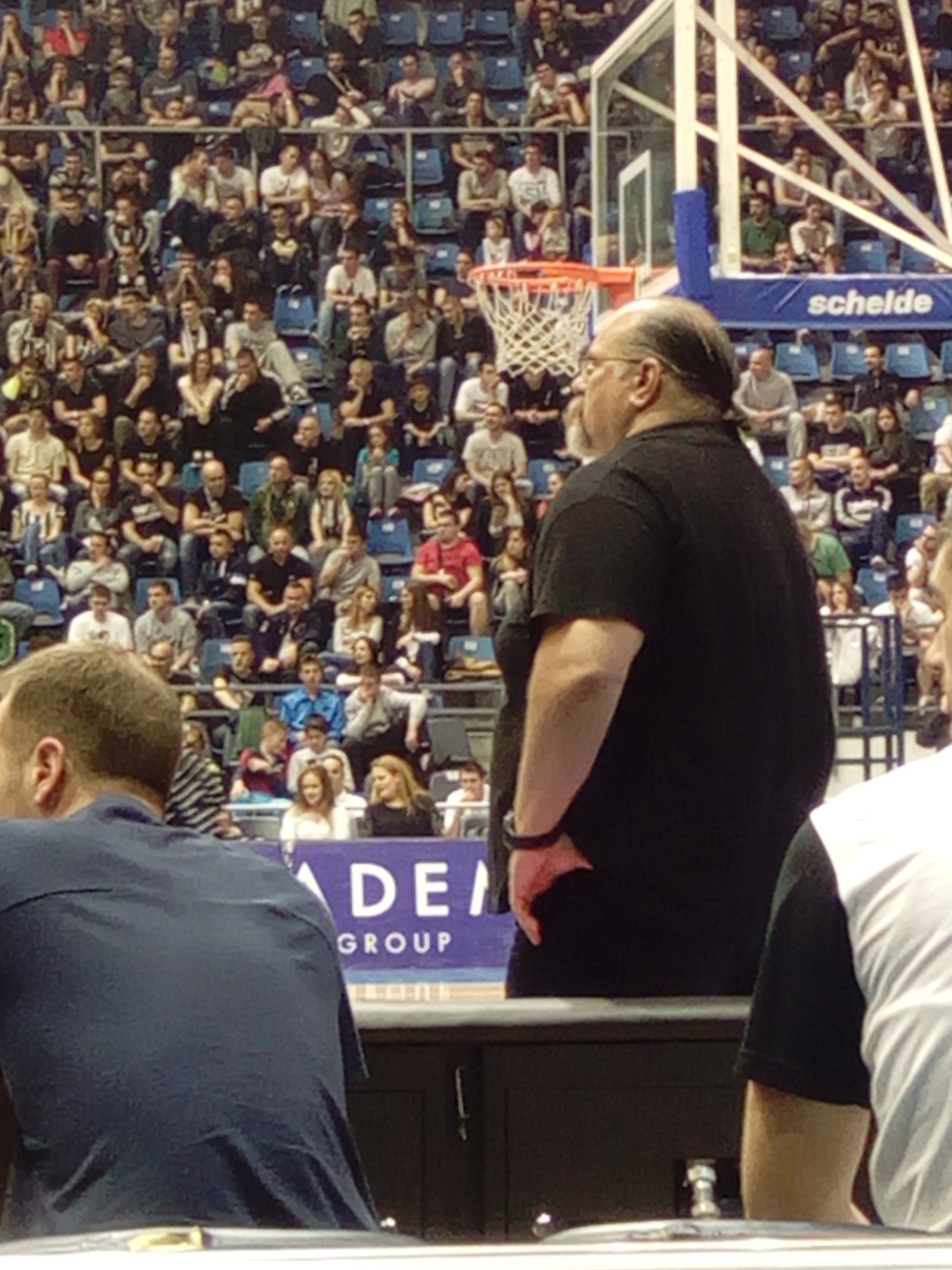
- Džikić coaching Partizan in May 2016

Personal information
- Born: 23 March 1971 (age 55) Belgrade, SR Serbia, SFR Yugoslavia
- Coaching career: 1991–present

Career history

Coaching
- 1994–1997: Beovuk (assistant)
- 1997–1999: Beovuk
- 1999–2005: Partizan (assistant)
- 2005–2007: Minnesota Timberwolves (assistant)
- 2008: Olimpija Ljubljana
- 2009–2011: Krka
- 2011–2012: Lietuvos rytas
- 2013–2015: Krka
- 2014–2015: North Macedonia
- 2016–2017: Partizan
- 2017–2018: Budućnost
- 2019–2020: Estudiantes
- 2021–2022: Budućnost
- 2022–2024: Hapoel Jerusalem
- 2024–present: Georgia

Career highlights
- FIBA EuroChallenge winner (2011); Israeli Cup winner (2023); Israeli League Cup winner (2023); Israeli League Coach of the Year (2023); ABA League champion (2018); 4× Slovenian League champion (2008, 2010, 2011, 2014); 3× Slovenian Cup winner (2008, 2014, 2015); 3× Slovenian Supercup winner (2008, 2010, 2014); Montenegrin League champion (2022); 2× Montenegrin Cup winner (2018, 2022)

Aleksandar Džikić (Serbian Cyrillic: Александар Џикић; born 23 March 1971) is a Serbian professional basketball coach and current head coach of Georgia men's national basketball team.

== Coaching career ==
=== Early career ===
==== KK Partizan youth system ====
Džikić began his coaching career in 1991 by getting hired to a staff position within the KK Partizan youth system, assisting youth team head coach Dragan Dragosavac. Working with youth prospects such as sixteen-year-olds Predrag Drobnjak and Aleksandar Čubrilo, the youth team assistant coach soon got the opportunity to even coach the Partizan youth squad after Dragosavac left.

After Dragosavac, young Džikić assisted subsequent Partizan youth team head coaches Petar Rodić (1992–1993) and Nenad Trajković (1993–1994).

==== Beovuk ====
In 1994, Džikić accepted KK Beovuk's offer of becoming head coach Milan "Miša" Lakić's first assistant. The job further entailed coaching responsibilities in the club's youth system that featured talented prospects, some of whom—Dejan Milojević, Predrag Savović, and Ognjen Aškrabić—would go on to notable basketball careers.

During summer 1997, twenty-six-year-old Džikić became Beovuk's head coach, his first head coaching experience. He stayed at the job for two seasons (1997–98 and 1998–99) leading the team in FR Yugoslavia's second-tier basketball league.

=== Assistant at KK Partizan ===
In summer 1999, Džikić returned to KK Partizan, this time as the first team's assistant coach, a move facilitated by the club's incoming head coach Nenad Trajković — Džikić's old boss from their time coaching in the club's youth system.

Trajković lasted only a season and Darko Russo took over the head coaching post in summer 2000 while Džikić remained in the assistant role.

In summer 2001 Duško Vujošević returned as Partizan's head coach after ten years away from the club, and Džikić once again continued in his assistant role – contributing to the team's four consecutive Serbia and Montenegro league titles from 2002 to 2005.

From August 2002, Džikić's public profile in Serbia got raised as he began writing an online blog/column on B92.net. Written with irregular frequency, the column would continue until November 2007.

While assisting Vujošević at Partizan, Džikić got his first taste of the NBA through Summer League in 2003. He ended up on two different coaching staffs that summer – Seattle's and San Antonio's – first with the SuperSonics for three weeks in Los Angeles, working under head coach Nate McMillan and his assistants Dwane Casey and Dean Demopoulos. A few days after Seattle's summer league participation ended, Džikić went to Salt Lake City to join San Antonio's coaching staff featuring head coach Gregg Popovich in addition to his assistants Mike Brown, Mike Budenholzer, Brett Brown, Joe Prunty, and video coordinator James Borrego.

After completing the 2003–04 season assisting Vujošević at Partizan, Džikić went back for another NBA Summer League stint with San Antonio for three weeks in July 2004 on invitation by the team's head coach Gregg Popovich. While with the Spurs, the assistant coach continued writing his online column, providing his readers with insider views from the San Antonio Summer League camp. Džikić reunited with Popovich less than a month later at the Belgrade International Coaching Clinic, interpreting and translating for the famous coach who was additionally in town as the US national team assistant to Larry Brown for their friendly game versus Serbia-Montenegro ahead of the upcoming Summer Olympics in Athens. Later that summer, through the Serbian Basketball Coaches Association (UKTS) professional development program, Džikić got to spend a month in Chapel Hill, North Carolina with the Roy Williams-coached North Carolina Tar Heels men's basketball program as it prepared for the upcoming season.

In summer 2005, after completing the 2004–05 season assisting Vujošević at Partizan, Džikić was invited by the newly hired Minnesota Timberwolves head coach Dwane Casey to join the team for their 2005 Summer League.

In late July 2005, while still with the Timberwolves in the Summer League, the thirty-four-year-old got announced as the new head coach of KK Atlas, a Belgrade-based club competing in Serbia and Montenegro's top-tier basketball league, for the upcoming 2005–06 season. It was to be only his second head coaching job and his very first time being head coach in the country's top division, however, due to an unexpected offer from the NBA before the Serbian-Montenegrin season even began, he never ended up coaching Atlas in any official games.

=== Minnesota Timberwolves assistant coach ===
In September 2005, after completing his 2005 Summer League coaching stint with the Minnesota Timberwolves at Target Center and coming back to Serbia where he had begun his head coaching duties at KK Atlas, Džikić suddenly received the Timberwolves' 3-year guaranteed contract offer for an assistant coaching position on their staff under incoming head coach Dwane Casey. Accepting the Timberwolves' offer entailed leaving the head coaching post at Atlas after only six weeks on the job, without a chance to coach a single official game. Thirty-four-year-old Džikić thus became the very first NBA assistant coach with no prior coaching experience in the United States at either the collegiate or professional level. Additionally, he became just the second European native to be hired as an NBA assistant coach, after Igor Kokoškov who got on the Los Angeles Clippers coaching staff in an assistant role in 2000.

Only sixteen months removed from the team's successful 2004 playoff run that ended in the Western Conference final against the Kobe-and-Shaq Lakers, the Timberwolves were looking for a swift return to playoff contention following a disappointing season during which they made a coaching change, firing their longtime coach Flip Saunders around the 2005 All-Star break with the team out of a playoff position. During his first season at Minnesota, Džikić—assisting Casey alongside Johnny Davis, Rex Kalamian, and Vince Taylor—was tasked with working with rookies Rashad McCants and Bracey Wright.

Casey got fired by the Timberwolves in January 2007 and replaced with Randy Wittman, one of his assistants. As a result of Casey's firing, Džikić got let go from his assistant coaching role though he stayed with the organization in scouting capacity until the end of the season.

In late 2007, Džikić went back to Europe.

=== Union Olimpija ===
On 7 January 2008, after spending two and half years in the United States, Džikić became head coach of Slovenian team KK Union Olimpija.

Olimpija Union dismissed him in December 2008, after bad results in Adriatic League and EuroLeague and was replaced by Jure Zdovc.

=== Krka ===
On 15 July 2009, he became head coach of KK Krka in Slovenia.

In his first season, Krka did not compete in the Adriatic League thus being able to fully focus on the Slovenian League competition. Džikić led the club to the Premier A Slovenian League title, the club's third in history, beating his old club Olimpija 3–2 in the playoff final series.

In the following 2010–11 season, he added to his success with Krka. Following a 17–9 Adriatic League regular season record, they made the Adriatic League final four in Ljubljana where they lost to old rivals Olimpija. Some ten days later Krka won the 2010–11 FIBA EuroChallenge, defeating PBC Lokomotiv-Kuban in the final. Finally, they repeated as Slovenian Basketball League champions. Soon after the successful seasons with Krka, richer European clubs, like BC Khimki, expressed interest in his services. He returned to Krka in June 2013.

=== Lietuvos rytas ===
In July 2011 Džikić was named the head coach of Lithuanian team BC Lietuvos rytas. In his first season at the club, the team came runners-up in the domestic league, losing the playoff final 0–3 to Žalgiris. The club recorded significant success on the European stage - following the heartbreak of missing out on EuroLeague due to losing versus Galatasaray at the last stage of qualifying tournament, the team responded by making the Eurocup final-four where they lost the semi-final to Valencia before winning the third place match over Spartak Saint Petersburg. Lietuvos rytas also took part in two regional competitions: VTB United League where they made the final-four, losing the semi-final to powerhouse CSKA Moscow and also the Baltic Basketball League, which they joined at the playoff stage and made the final that they lost to Žalgiris.

On 12 October 2012, he parted ways with the team.

=== Return to Krka ===
In 2013, Džikić returned to be a head coach of the Slovenian team Krka. In June 2015, he left Krka.

=== Partizan Belgrade ===
On 5 January 2016, he was named a head coach of the Serbian team Partizan Belgrade, following the departure of Petar Božić. On 13 June 2017, he parted ways with Partizan.

=== Budućnost ===
On 22 June 2017, Džikić was named the head coach of Budućnost Podgorica.

In February 2018, Budućnost won its 5th consecutive, and 11th overall, Montenegrin Basketball Cup, beating KK Mornar Bar 87–83 in the final game.

In the ABA League, Džikić led Budućnost to second place in the regular season with a 17–5 record. In the ABA League playoffs semifinal best-of-three series, they eliminated the Croatian team Cedevita 2 games to 1. In April 2018, Budućnost won the ABA League best-of-five finals series 3 games to 1 against the reigning champions Crvena zvezda. They were thus crowned ABA League champions for the first time in club history and also secured a spot in the 2018–19 EuroLeague, marking their return to the elite European competition after 16 seasons.

On 31 July 2018, Džikić re-signed with Budućnost for two more seasons.

On 29 December 2018, one day after losing away to Bayern Munich in EuroLeague despite being up by 17 points in the first half and by 16 in the third quarter, Džikić got released by Budućnost. The Bayern loss was the sixth consecutive defeat for the club in all competitions during mid-to-late December 2018 – a losing streak that began on 14 December 2018 at Gran Canaria in EuroLeague, continuing two days later in Zagreb away to KK Cibona in the Adriatic League, and then two more days after that on 18 December 2018 at Anadolu Efes in EuroLeague followed by a home EuroLeague loss versus Fenerbahçe on 20 December 2018, and a road loss to KK Krka on the Christmas Eve. Budućnost had a 3–12 record in EuroLeague as well as 8–4 record in the Adriatic League (3rd spot in the standings) at the time of Džikić's firing.

=== Estudiantes ===
On 3 July 2019, Džikić became the head coach of Movistar Estudiantes. On 21 January 2020, he parted ways and left the team in the last position with only four wins out of 18 matches played.

=== Return to Budućnost ===
On 2 June 2021, Džikić signed with Budućnost VOLI of the ABA League. He left the Club in June 2022.

=== Hapoel Jerusalem ===
On 18 June 2022 Džikić became the head coach of Hapoel Jerusalem. In 2023, the team won the Israeli Cup, and Džikić was named Coach of the Year.

Džikić was released from his contract on 4 January 2024. The team's press release stated: “It is not every day or year that a basketball team has to part ways with its coach, other than for professional reasons. Unfortunately, we are experiencing such a case for the first time. Hapoel “Bank Yahav” Jerusalem announces the release of coach Alexander Dzikic, due to personal challenges as a result of the security situation in Israel.”

=== Georgia’s National Team ===
On 4 January 2024, the same day Džikić was released from his contract with Hapoel Jerusalem, he was named head coach of Georgia's National Team.

== National team coaching ==
=== Youth level ===
==== FR Yugoslavia under-16 assistant ====
Džikić assisted head coach Petar Rodić who selected the Yugoslav under-16 (cadet) team at the 1999 European Championship for Cadets.

==== Serbia under-20 head coach ====
On 4 May 2011, Džikić got named the head coach of Serbian under-20 national team, in parallel with his club coaching duties at Krka.

Two months later, in July 2011, he selected the team for the sixteen-squad 2011 European under-20 Championship in Bilbao, Spain. Led by nineteen and twenty-year-old prospects Nemanja Nedović, Nemanja Jaramaz, Danilo Anđušić, Nikola Kalinić, and Branislav Đekić, Serbia got eliminated at the group stage after recording a win versus Russia in the opening game, followed by two blowout losses, to Montenegro and Slovenia. This sent the team to the 13th to 16th place classification round with Lithuania, Croatia, and Austria with the knowledge that the bottom two teams would be relegated to European under-20 B division. Džikić's team finally got their act together, recording six assured wins to stay in the A division.

The following summer, Džikić – who had in the meantime moved on to coaching Lietuvos rytas at the club level – selected the Serbian under-20 team for the 2012 European under-20 Championship in Slovenia. Led by a new group of talented prospects – Bogdan Bogdanović, Luka Mitrović, Ivan Marinković, Nenad Miljenović, Nemanja Bešović, and Stefan Nastić – Serbia dominated its first-round group with two blowout wins, over Montenegro and Germany, followed by a three-point win over France. Džikić's team continued its domination in the second-round group stage with three more blowout wins, this time over Ukraine, Greece, and Russia. In the quarterfinals, the first single-elimination stage, Serbia comfortably defeated Latvia thus qualifying for the semifinals. In the semis, they faced Lithuania and lost by five points, getting relegated to the bronze-medal game. Serbia lost the third-place game versus Spain by a point thus finishing just out of the medals.

=== Macedonia national basketball team ===
On 31 December 2013, Džikić got named head coach of the Macedonia national basketball team, succeeding Aleš Pipan in the job.

=== Georgia national basketball team ===
On 4 January 2024, the same day Džikić was released from his contract with Hapoel Jerusalem, he was named head coach of Georgia's National Team.

== Coaching record ==
Legend
G	Games coached	W	Games won	L	Games lost	W–L %	Win-loss %

Note: The EuroLeague is not the only competition in which the team played during the season. He also coached in domestic competition, and regional competition if applicable.

=== EuroLeague ===
Team	Year	G	W	L	W–L%	Result
Union Olimpija	2007–08	4	1	3	.250	Eliminated in regular season
Union Olimpija	2008–09	6	1	5	.167	Fired
Lietuvos rytas	2012–13	1	0	1	.000	Fired
Budućnost	2018–19	15	3	12	.200	Fired
Career		26	5	21	.192	

== Media career ==
In parallel with his coaching career, Džikić has had various basketball-related media engagements in his native Serbia.

In August 2002, KK Partizan's assistant coach Džikić began writing an online blog/column on the B92.net portal's sports section. Written with irregular frequency, the column continued until November 2007 by which time Džikić had moved on to become the assistant coach with the Minnesota Timberwolves.

From 2020 until 2021, Džikić co-hosted a podcast named Blok po blok with the Sport Klub sportscaster and television personality Srđan Radojević.

== See also ==
- List of ABA League-winning coaches
- List of Serbian NBA coaches
- List of foreign NBA coaches
