= Tomo Mahorič =

Slovene basketball coach

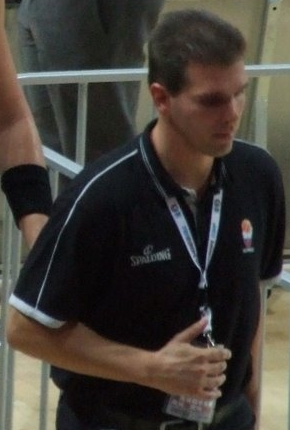
- Tomo Mahorič (2009)

Personal information
- Born: April 28, 1965 (age 61) Ljubljana, SR Slovenia, SFR Yugoslavia

Career history
- 1992–1995: Smelt Olimpija (assistant)
- 1995–1996: Interier Krško
- 1997–1999: Union Olimpija (assistant)
- 1999–2002: Slovan
- 2002–2003: Union Olimpija
- 2004–2005: Idea-Slask Wroclaw
- 2005: Lietuvos rytas
- 2006: Union Olimpija
- 2006–2008: BC Kyiv
- 2006–2008: Vanoli Cremona
- 2015–2016: JSA Bordeaux Basket

Career highlights
- 2× Slovenian Cup winner (1999, 2003); Slovenian League champion (1999); ULEB Cup winner (2005); Ukrainian Cup winner (2007)

Tomo Mahorič (born April 28, 1965) is a Slovenian basketball coach. He was a coach of Krško, Slovan, Union Olimpija, Lietuvos rytas, BC Kyiv, Vanoli Cremona and JSA Bordeaux Basket.
