= Zoran Martič =

Slovenian basketball coach

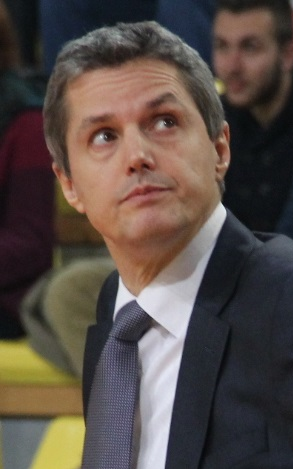
- Martič with MZT Skopje

Cedevita Olimpija
- Position: Head coach
- League: ABA League; Slovenian League; Eurocup

Personal information
- Born: May 8, 1965 (age 61) Celje, SFR Yugoslavia
- Coaching career: 1992–present

Career history

Playing
- 1983–1985: KK Libela Celje
- Šentjur
- Ilirija Ljubljana

Coaching
- 1992–1993: Ilirija
- 1993–1997: Smelt Olimpija (youth)
- 1995–1997: Smelt Olimpija mladi
- 1997–1999: Geoplin Slovan
- 1999–2000: Rogla Zreče
- 2000–2001: Loka Kava
- 2001–2002: Kraški Zidar
- 2002–2003: Szolnoki Olaj
- 2003–2004: Krka
- 2004–2005: Budućnost
- 2005: Geoplin Slovan
- 2005–2006: Apoel Nicosia
- 2006–2007: Zlatorog Laško
- 2007–2008: Helios Domžale
- 2008–2010: Union Olimpija (assistant)
- 2010–2011: Khimik
- 2012: Körmend
- 2012–2013: Khimik
- 2013–2014: MZT Skopje
- 2015–2017: Trefl Sopot
- 2018: Petrol Olimpija
- 2020–2024: Chiba Jets
- 2024–present: Cedevita Olimpija

Zoran Martič is a Slovenian basketball coach who is head coach for Cedevita Olimpija of the Adriatic League and the Slovenian Basketball League.

== Best results ==
- 1998 – 2nd place European U22 championship
- 2000 – 1st place European U20 championship
- 2001 – 6th place World U20 championship
- 2003/04 – 5th place Goodyear – Adriatic league (Budučnost)
- 2004/05 – semi finalist of the Serbia & Montenegro cup (Budučnost)
- 2005 – finalist of the Slovenian play off (Slovan)
- 2006 – quarter finalist of FIBA Challenge cup
- 2007 – semi finalist of the Slovenian play off (Zlatorog Laško)
- 2008 – finalist of the Slovenian Cup and finalist of the Slovenian play off (Helios), winner of the Slovenian all star game
- 2014 – Macedonian League winner, Macedonian Cup winner (MZT Skopje)
- 2018 – Slovenian League champion (2018)
- 2024 – Slovenian Cup winner

== Personal life ==
Martič's older brother, Zvezdan Martič, is a journalist and engineer.
