= Jure Zdovc =

Slovenian basketball player & coach (born 1966)

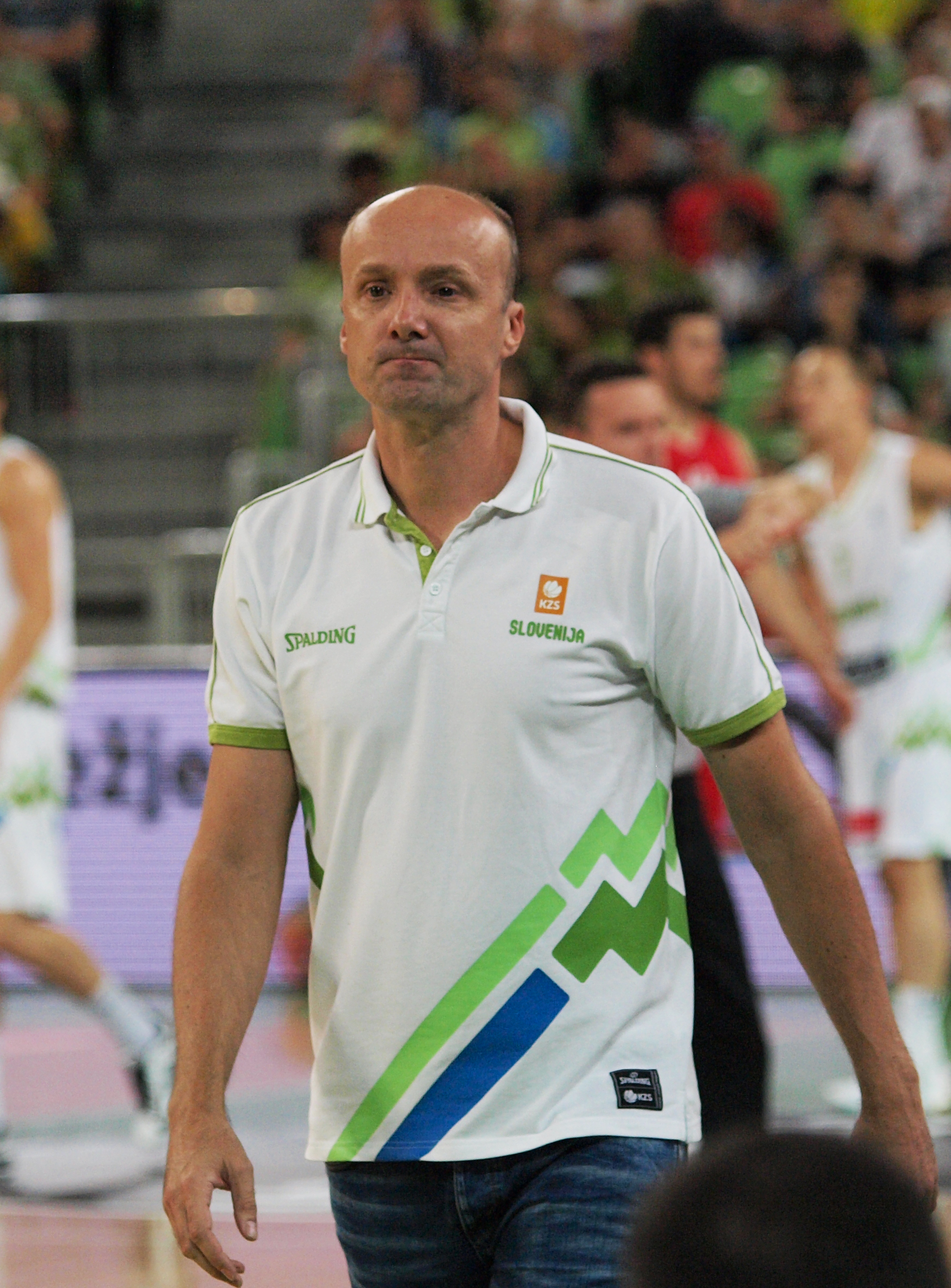
- Zdovc with Slovenia in 2015

Personal information
- Born: 13 December 1966 (age 59) Slovenske Konjice, SR Slovenia, SFR Yugoslavia
- Listed height: 6 ft 6 in (1.98 m)
- Listed weight: 195 lb (88 kg)

Career information
- NBA draft: 1988: undrafted
- Playing career: 1984–2003
- Position: Point guard
- Coaching career: 1997–present

Career history

Playing
- 1984–1991: Smelt Olimpija
- 1991–1992: Knorr Bologna
- 1992–1993: Limoges
- 1993–1996: Iraklis Thessaloniki
- 1997: PSG Racing
- 1997: Tofaş
- 1998–2000: Union Olimpija
- 2000–2001: Panionios
- 2001–2002: Union Olimpija
- 2002–2003: Slovan
- 2003: Split CO

Coaching
- 1997–1998: Comet Slovenske Konjice (assistant)
- 2003: Krka (assistant)
- 2003–2004: Split
- 2004: Geoplin Slovan
- 2005–2006: Iraklis Thessaloniki
- 2007–2008: Bosna
- 2008–2011: Union Olimpija
- 2008–2009: Slovenia
- 2011–2013: Spartak Saint Petersburg
- 2014–2015: Slovenia
- 2013–2015: Royal Halı Gaziantep
- 2014–2016: Slovenia
- 2015–2017: AEK
- 2017–2018: Cedevita
- 2019–2020: Petrol Olimpija
- 2020–2021: Metropolitans 92
- 2021–2022: Žalgiris Kaunas
- 2023–2024: Bursaspor
- 2025–2026: PAOK

Career highlights
- As a player: EuroLeague champion (1993); 3× FIBA European Selection (1990, 1991 2×); FIBA EuroStar (1996); 2× Greek League All-Star (1994 II, 1996 II); 2× French League champion (1993, 1997); Adriatic League champion (2002); Adriatic League Final Four MVP (2002); Croatian League champion (2003); 2× Slovenian League champion (1999, 2002); 3× Slovenian Cup winner (1999, 2000, 2002); 2× Slovenian League All-Star (1999, 2000); Slovenian Athletes Hall of Fame (2015); As a head coach: EuroCup Coach of the Year (2012); Adriatic League Super Cup winner (2017); Lithuanian King Mindaugas Cup winner (2022); Croatian League champion (2018); 2× Croatian Cup winner (2004, 2018); Slovenian League champion (2009); 3× Slovenian Cup winner (2009–2011); Slovenian Supercup winner (2010); Bosnian League champion (2008)
- FIBA Hall of Fame
Medals
Men's basketball
Representing Yugoslavia
Summer Olympic Games
Silver medal – second place	1988 Seoul
FIBA World Cup
Gold medal – first place	1990 Argentina
EuroBasket
Gold medal – first place	1989 Yugoslavia
Gold medal – first place	1991 Italy
Goodwill Games
Gold medal – first place	1990 Seattle
European Championship for Juniors
Bronze medal – third place	1984 Sweden	Under-18
European Championship for Cadets
Gold medal – first place	1983 West Germany	Under-16

Jurij "Jure" Zdovc (born 13 December 1966) is a Slovenian former professional basketball player and coach who last served as the head coach of PAOK of the Greek Basketball League and the FIBA Europe Cup. As a player, he was a 1.98 m (6 ft 6 in) tall point guard, who began his professional playing career with the Yugoslav Second Division club Smelt Olimpija.

During his playing career, he was a three-time member of the FIBA European Selection, in the years 1990 and 1991 (twice), and a FIBA EuroStar selection, in 1996. He also represented both the senior Yugoslav national team, and the senior Slovenian national team. He was inducted into the Slovenian Athletes Hall of Fame in 2015. He was inducted into the FIBA Hall of Fame in 2020.

As a basketball coach, Zdovc received the EuroCup Coach of the Year award in 2012, while he was the head coach of the Russian club Spartak Saint Petersburg.

== Playing career ==
=== Club career ===
As a junior level player, Zdovc began his playing career with Comet Slovenske Konjice. He also played for the junior teams of Smelt Olimpija. During his senior men's pro club career, he played for the following teams: the senior men's team of Smelt Olimpija, Knorr Bologna, Limoges CSP, Iraklis Thessaloniki, Helios Suns, PSG Racing, Tofaş, Panionios Athens, Geoplin Slovan, and Split CO.

With the French club Limoges CSP, Zdovc won the EuroLeague's 1992–93 season championship, and he was voted to the EuroLeague All-Final Four Team. He also won the French League's 1992–93 season championship, while playing with Limoges. In 1997, as a Paris Racing player, he also won the French League championship.

While playing with Union Olimpija, Zdovc won two Slovenian Premier League championships, and three Slovenian Cups. With the same club, he also won the 2001–02 season's championship of the Adriatic League, and he was voted the 2002 Adriatic League Final Four MVP. With Split Croatia, he won the 2003 Croatian Premier League championship.

=== Yugoslav national team ===
Zdovc was a member of the senior Yugoslavia National Squad. With Yugoslavia, he won the silver medal at the 1988 Seoul Summer Olympics. As a member of Yugoslavia's national selection, he also won gold medals at the 1989 EuroBasket, the 1990 FIBA World Championship, and the 1991 EuroBasket.

=== Slovenian national team ===
As a member of the senior Slovenian national team, Zdovc played at the following major FIBA international tournaments: the 1992 FIBA European Olympic Qualifying Tournament, the 1993 EuroBasket, the 1995 EuroBasket, the 1997 EuroBasket, and the 1999 EuroBasket.

== Coaching career ==
=== Clubs ===
Zdovc first worked as a basketball coach in the 1997–98 season, with Comet Slovenske Konjice, where he worked as an assistant. That was still during his active playing career, but during a time in which he was not playing, due to a long-term injury that he suffered while he was playing with the Turkish Super League club Tofaş. After he retired from playing professional club basketball in 2003, Zdovc started his full-time basketball coaching career as the head coach of the Croatian Premier League club Split Croatia. He stayed the head coach of Split Croatia until 2004, and led the team to a first-place finish in the Croatian Cup. In the 2006–07 season, he was the sports director of Union Olimpija.

Zdovc also won the Bosnia and Herzegovina League championship with Bosna in 2008. In 2009, he won the Slovenian Premier League championship with Union Olimpija. Zdovc also won the Slovenian Cup title three times in a row with Union Olimpija, in the years 2009, 2010, and 2011. He also led Union Olimpija to the top Top-16 stage of the EuroLeague's 2010–11 season.

Zdovc was named the EuroCup Coach of the Year in 2012. On 20 December 2015, he signed a three-year contract with the Greek Basket League club AEK Athens. He was dismissed in the role by AEK Athens, in March 2017, after his team lost a 2016–17 FIBA Champions League game against the French Pro A League club AS Monaco.

On 14 June 2017, Zdovc was named as the head coach of the Croatian club Cedevita Zagreb, as he replaced Veljko Mršić in that role. He was later sacked by the club on 6 June 2018.

On 7 May 2020, Zdovc signed on to be the head coach of the Metropolitans 92 of the French LNB Pro A. Zdovc worked with Žalgiris Kaunas in the 2021–2022 season, though had a very tumultuous season, resigning in April. With Žalgiris, Zdovc won the 2022 King Mindaugas Cup.

On 7 July 2023, he signed with Bursaspor of the Turkish Basketbol Süper Ligi. On 16 January 2024, Zdovc and Bursaspor parted ways.

On 1 July 2025, Zdovc was named as the head coach of PAOK Thessaloniki of the Greek Basketball League and the FIBA Europe Cup. The club released him on 2 March 2026.

=== National teams ===
In 2009, Zdovc was named the head coach of the senior men's Slovenian national team. He guided Slovenia to a fourth-place finish at the 2009 EuroBasket. In 2014, Zdovc returned to coach Slovenia, after signing a three-year contract to coach the team. He coached Slovenia at the 2014 FIBA World Cup, and the 2015 EuroBasket.

== Head coaching record ==
Legend
G	Games coached	W	Games won	L	Games lost	W–L %	Win-loss %

Note: The EuroLeague is not the only competition in which the team played during the season. He also coached in domestic competition, and regional competition if applicable.

=== EuroLeague ===
Team	Year	G	W	L	W–L%	Result
Union Olimpija	2008–09	2	0	2	.000	Eliminated in regular season
Union Olimpija	2009–10	10	1	9	.100	Eliminated in regular season
Union Olimpija	2010–11	16	7	9	.438	Eliminated in Top 16 stage
Žalgiris Kaunas	2021–22	28	8	20	.286	Eliminated in regular season
Career		56	16	40	.286	
