= Shawn King (basketball) =

Vincentian basketball player

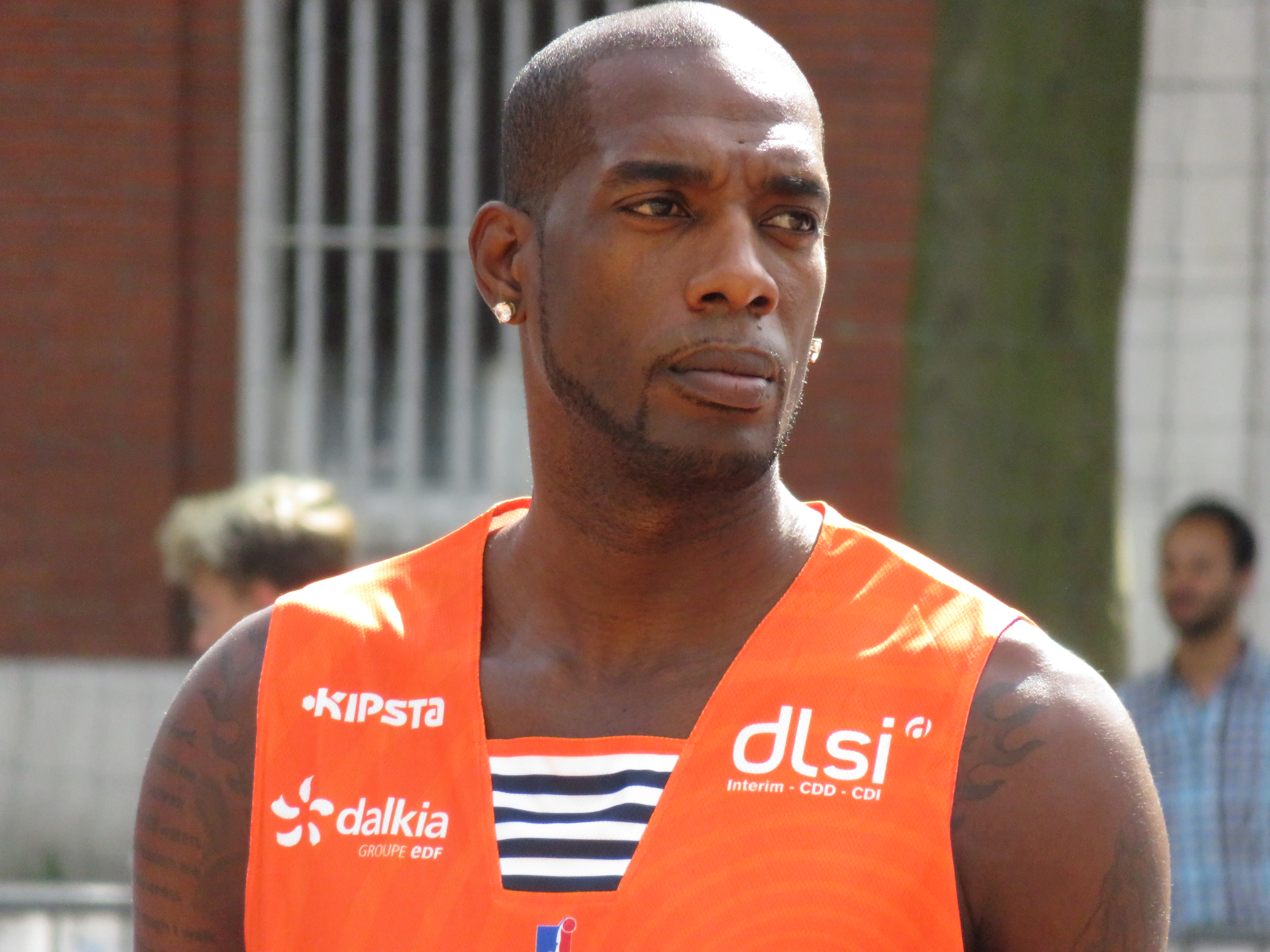
- King with BCM Gravelines in 2016

Personal information
- Born: June 6, 1982 (age 44) Gasparillo, Trinidad and Tobago
- Listed height: 6 ft 10 in (2.08 m)

Career information
- College: Carl Albert State (2004–2006); Oral Roberts (2006–2008)
- NBA draft: 2008: undrafted
- Playing career: 2008–2021
- Position: Center

Career history
- 2008–2010: Hopsi Polzela
- 2010–2011: Minsk-2006
- 2011–2012: Odesa
- 2012–2013: SLUC Nancy
- 2013–2014: Virtus Bologna
- 2014–2015: STB Le Havre
- 2015–2016: BC Kalev
- 2016: Gravelines-Dunkerque
- 2016–2017: Stal Ostrów Wielkopolski
- 2017–2018: Primorska
- 2018–2019: Stal Ostrów Wielkopolski
- 2019–2020: Denain Voltaire
- 2020–2021: Stal Ostrów Wielkopolski

Career highlights
- 2× Slovenian League MVP (2009, 2010); VTB United League rebounding leader (2011); All-KML Team (2016); PLK Most Valuable Player (2017); All-PLK Team (2017); Slovenian Cup winner (2018)

Shawn Ethelbert King (born June 6, 1982) is a Vincentian professional basketball player, who lastly played for Stal Ostrów Wielkopolski of the Polish Basketball League (PLK). King is one of Saint Vincent and the Grenadines' most prominent basketball figures.

== Professional career ==
On May 9, 2016, King set the record for most rebounds in a game for the VTB United League, with 25 rebounds in an 81–73 win over Tsmoki-Minsk.

On November 10, 2016, King signed with Stal Ostrów Wielkopolski of the Polish Basketball League. King was named the PLK Most Valuable Player of the 2016–17 season.

On September 6, 2017, King signed with Slovenian club Sixt Primorska for the 2017–18 season.

For the 2019–20 season, King signed with Denain in France, a team which played in the LNB Pro B, and averaged 7 points and 7 rebounds per game. On August 12, 2020, he rejoined Stal Ostrów Wielkopolski.

== International career ==
King represents the Saint Vincent and the Grenadines national basketball team internationally. He grabbed most rebounds and blocked most shots for his national team at the 2015 FIBA CBC Championship in Road Town, British Virgin Islands.
