= Aleš Pipan =

Slovenian basketball coach (born 1959)

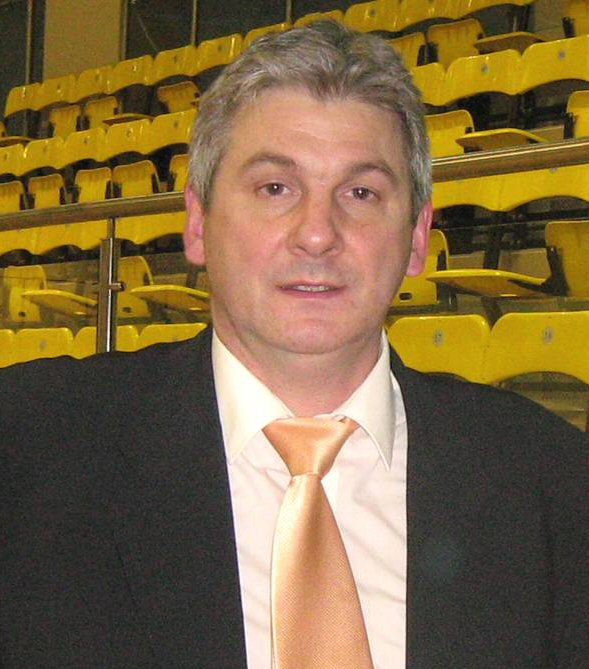

Golden Eagle Ylli
- Position: Head coach

Personal information
- Born: 24 May 1959 (age 67) Ljubljana, PR Slovenia, PFR Yugoslavia

Career history
- 1993–1996: Maribor
- 1997–2000: Zlatorog Laško
- 2000–2002: Krka
- 2002–2003: Zagorje
- 2003–2005: Zlatorog Laško
- 2005–2007: Slovan
- 2007–2008: Anwil Włocławek
- 2008–2011: Zlatorog Laško
- 2011–2012: Zadar
- 2012–2013: MZT Skopje
- 2013–2015: Union Olimpija
- 2015: MZT Skopje
- 2015–2018: Zlatorog Laško
- 2018: Zadar
- 2019: TF Budapest
- 2019–2020: Šentjur
- 2022–2023: Zlatorog Laško
- 2025–present: Golden Eagle Ylli

Career highlights
- 2× Macedonian League champion (2013, 2015); Slovenian cup winner (2004); Polish Cup winner (2007); Polish Supercup winner (2007); Macedonian Cup winner (2013)
Medals
Men's basketball
Representing Yugoslavia
European Championship for Juniors
Bronze medal – third place	1978 Italy	Team

Aleš Pipan (born 24 May 1959) is a Slovenian basketball coach and former player.

== Coaching career ==
Pipan coached Slovenia at three tournaments (EuroBasket 2005, 2006 FIBA World Championship and EuroBasket 2007) until his resignation in 2008, when Slovenia failed to qualify for the 2008 Summer Olympics. Before that, he was present in the Slovenian national team as assistant coach since 1998.

Pipan came to Zlatorog Laško in 1996, where he was especially known for his work with young players. He led the club to the Saporta Cup in 1997 and 1998. In 1999, he took them to the quarterfinals where they lost to Aris, but earned them the right to play the EuroLeague in the next season. In those two seasons in the Saporta Cup, he helped develop two national team players to the international scene, Sani Bečirovič and Goran Jurak. The following season (1999–2000) was the first that two Slovenian clubs played in the EuroLeague. However, in domestic competitions, Pipan reached two finals but failed to win any trophies, as some key players, including Boštjan Nachbar and Mileta Lisica, were struggling with injuries.

In 2000, he took over Krka and led them in the Suproleague, EuroLeague, domestic competitions and in the first edition of the Adriatic League, until he was replaced with Neven Spahija in December 2001.

After a brief episode with Zagorje, Pipan returned to Pivovarna Laško in the 2003–04 season, where he won the Slovenian Cup and lost in the league final to Olimpija. After another year with Pivovarna Laško, he took over Slovan from Ljubljana in the 2005–06 season, where he lost another final of domestic league to Olimpija. One season later, he resigned in the middle of the season.

Pipan took over Polish club Anwil Włocławek in January 2007. After two months in charge, he won the Polish Cup by beating the EuroLeague team Prokom Trefl Sopot in the final. He finished the 2006–07 season in fourth place, losing 4–3 in the semifinals against Prokom Trefl Sopot. In revenge, he beat Prokom Trefl Sopot again in the Super Cup game that opened the 2007–08 season in Poland.

In 2009, he returned to his former club, now known under new name Zlatorog (formerly Pivovarna laško). After two years he took over KK Zadar in the Croatian League and qualify with them for the ABA League. In October 2012 he took over MZT Skopje and won the Macedonian championship.

On 28 June 2018, Pipan returned to Zadar, but after just four months, he was sacked on 23 October 2018 because of poor results.

== Clubs ==
=== Head coach ===
- (Slovenia) 1993–1996: Maribor in Slovenian League
- (Slovenia) 1997–2000: Zlatorog Laško in Slovenian League
- (Slovenia) 2000–2002: Krka in Slovenian League
- (Slovenia) 2002–2003: Zagorje in Slovenian League
- (Slovenia) 2003–2005: Zlatorog Laško in Slovenian League
- (Slovenia) 2005–2007: Slovan in Slovenian League
- (Poland) 2007–2008: Anwil Włocławek in Polish League
- (Slovenia) 2008–2011: Zlatorog Laško in Slovenian League
- (Croatia) 2011–2012: Zadar in Croatian League
- (North Macedonia) 2012–2013: MZT Skopje in Macedonian League
- (Slovenia) 2013–2015: Olimpija in Slovenian League
- (North Macedonia) 2015: MZT Skopje in Macedonian League
- (Slovenia) 2015–2018: Zlatorog Laško in Slovenian League
- (Croatia) 2018: Zadar in Croatian League
- (Hungary) 2019: TF Budapest in Hungarian league
- (Slovenia) 2019–2020: Šentjur in Slovenian League
- (Slovenia) 2022–2023: Zlatorog Laško in Slovenian League

== Head coaching career with national teams ==
- 1998–2003: Slovenia national team (assistant)
- 2004–2008: Slovenia national team
- 2010–2013: Poland national team
- (North Macedonia) 2013: Macedonia national team
