= KK Olimpija =

1946–2019 basketball club in Ljubljana, Slovenia

- Nickname: Zmaji (The Dragons); Zeleno-beli (The Green and Whites)
- Founded: 1946; 80 years ago
- Folded: 2019; 7 years ago
- History: KK Svoboda (1946); KK Enotnost (1947–1954); AŠK Olimpija (1955–1976); KK Olimpija (1976–2019); KK Cedevita Olimpija (2019–present)
- Location: Ljubljana, Slovenia
- Team colors: Green, white, black
- Championships: 17 Slovenian Leagues; 20 Slovenian Cups; 8 Slovenian Supercups; 6 Yugoslav Leagues; 1 Saporta Cup; 1 Adriatic League; 2 Central European Leagues
Home	Away

Košarkarski klub Olimpija (English: Olimpija Basketball Club) was a men's professional basketball club based in Ljubljana, Slovenia.

Founded in 1946, Olimpija competed in the Yugoslav Federal League (1946 to 1991) and the Slovenian League (1991 to 2019). They won 17 Slovenian League championships, including eight consecutive titles between 1992 and 1999. They also won three regional league championships, one in the Adriatic League and two in the Central European League. In addition, Olimpija won 20 Slovenian Cup tournaments, 8 Slovenian Supercup titles, and one FIBA Saporta Cup. In July 2019, the team merged with Cedevita, forming a new club Cedevita Olimpija.

== History ==
Olimpija basketball club was founded in 1946 as a section of the Svoboda Physical Culture Society. The first basketball game was played the same year against Udarnik and Olimpija came out on top with the score of 37–14. Late in 1946, the club was renamed Enotnost and was known by that name until 1954 when it assumed the name AŠK Olimpia.

Olimpija won its first Yugoslav League title in the 1957 season under the direction of the coach/player Boris Kristančić. In the following years, Olimpija won five more Yugoslav titles, in 1959, 1961, 1962, 1966, and 1970. A new era for the club began with Slovenia's independence when Olimpija won eight consecutive league titles between 1992 and 1999.

On the international stage, the 1993–94 season was the club's best season as they won the European Cup against the Spanish ACB League club Taugrés under the direction of coach Zmago Sagadin. In the 2001–02 season, Olimpija won the "Small Triple Crown", taking the Slovenian League championship, Slovenian Cup, and the Adriatic League.

On 8 July 2019, Olimpija merged with Croatian team Cedevita, forming Cedevita Olimpija.

The club was a founding member of the Adriatic Basketball Association in 2015. In November 2020, the club's shares were transferred to Mornar Bar.

== Names through history ==
The club was established in 1946 as the basketball department of the larger sports club Svoboda. Later, the name of the club was changed several times. Since 1976 and until its dissolution in 2019, the name of the club included the sponsorship name.

Names

- KK Svoboda (1946)
- KK Enotnost (1947–1954)
- AŠK Olimpija (1955–1976)
- KK Olimpija (1976–2019)

Between 1976 and 2019, the names of the club included the sponsorship names:

- Brest (1976–1978)
- Iskra (1978–1982)
- ZZI (1982–1983)
- Smelt (1983–1997)
- Union (1997–2017)
- Petrol (2017–2019)

== Arenas ==
The team's first venue was Tabor Gymnasium, before they moved to the 4,500 capacity Tivoli Hall in 1965. In 2010, the club moved into their new arena, Arena Stožice, with a capacity of 12,480.

== Notable players ==
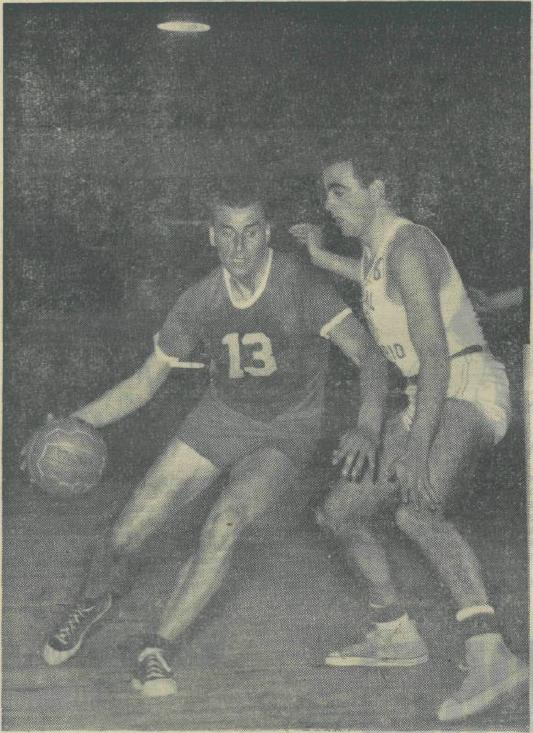
Ivo Daneu (left) in 1962

The following players are regarded as the most important for Olimpija by the club's official website.

- Ivo Daneu – has won the Yugoslav national championship six times with Olimpija and earned over 200 appearances for the Yugoslavia national basketball team. In 2007, he became the first Slovenian player included in the FIBA Hall of Fame.
- Borut Bassin – became the most valuable player of the 1967 FIBA European Champions Cup Final Four after scoring 30 points against Real Madrid. Bassin has also won the silver medal with Yugoslavia at the 1967 FIBA World Championship.
- Marko Milič – former Olimpija and Slovenia national team captain, he became the first Slovenian player to play in the National Basketball Association (NBA).
- Vinko Jelovac – earned 240 appearances for the Yugoslavia national team, with which he won the silver medal at the 1976 Summer Olympics.
- Peter Vilfan – spent most of his career playing for Olimpija; he became the first captain of the Slovenia national team after the country gained independence in 1991.
- Jure Zdovc – Regarded as one of the best point guards in Europe during the time of his career, Zdovc played for Olimpija in three spells between the 1980s and the early 2000s. Zdovc has won the EuroBasket with Yugoslavia in 1989 and 1991, and became the world champion with the team in 1990.

A total of 16 former Olimpija players have played in the NBA:

- Goran Dragić
- Rašo Nesterović
- Beno Udrih
- Šarūnas Jasikevičius
- Damjan Rudež
- Marko Milič
- Primož Brezec
- Vladimir Stepania
- Boštjan Nachbar
- Jiří Welsch
- Soumaila Samake
- Radisav Ćurčić
- Danny Green
- Aron Baynes
- Dāvis Bertāns
- Damir Markota

=== Retired numbers ===
Olimpija retired numbers
No	Nat.	Player	Position	Tenure	Date retired	Ref
12	(Slovenia)	Marko Milič	PF	1994–1997, 1999–2000, 2006–2009	2015	
13	(Slovenia)	Ivo Daneu	PG	1956–1970	2007	

=== Players in the NBA draft ===
*	Denotes player who has been selected for at least one All-Star Game and All-NBA Team
^{#}	Denotes player who has never appeared in an NBA regular-season or playoff game

Position	Player	Year	Round	Pick	Drafted by
PF	(Slovenia) Marko Milič	1997	2nd round	33rd	Philadelphia 76ers
C	(Georgia (country)) Vladimir Stepania	1998	1st round	27th	Seattle SuperSonics
C	(Slovenia) Primož Brezec	2000	1st round	27th	Indiana Pacers
SG/SF	(Czech Republic) Jiří Welsch	2002	1st round	16th	Philadelphia 76ers
SG/PG	(Israel) Yotam Halperin^{#}	2006	2nd round	53rd	Seattle SuperSonics
PG	(Slovenia) Goran Dragić^{*}	2008	2nd round	45th	San Antonio Spurs
PF	(Latvia) Dāvis Bertāns	2011	2nd round	42nd	Indiana Pacers
PG	(Ukraine) Issuf Sanon^{#}	2018	2nd round	44th	Washington Wizards
PF	(Croatia) Luka Šamanić	2019	1st round	19th	San Antonio Spurs

== Honours ==
=== Domestic competitions ===
- Slovenian League

Winners (17): 1991–92, 1992–93, 1993–94, 1994–95, 1995–96, 1996–97, 1997–98, 1998–99, 2000–01, 2001–02, 2003–04, 2004–05, 2005–06, 2007–08, 2008–09, 2016–17, 2017–18
Runners-up (8): 2002–03, 2006–07, 2009–10, 2010–11, 2011–12, 2012–13, 2013–14, 2018–19

- Slovenian Cup

Winners (20): 1992, 1993, 1994, 1995, 1997, 1998, 1999, 2000, 2001, 2002, 2003, 2005, 2006, 2008, 2009, 2010, 2011, 2012, 2013, 2017
Runners-up (3): 2004, 2007, 2014

- Slovenian Supercup

Winners (8): 2003, 2004, 2005, 2007, 2008, 2009, 2013, 2017
Runners-up (5): 2010, 2011, 2012, 2014, 2018

- Yugoslav League

Winners (6): 1957, 1959, 1961, 1962, 1966, 1969–70
Runners-up (8): 1953, 1956, 1958, 1960, 1965, 1967, 1967–68, 1968–69

- Yugoslav Cup

Runners-up (5): 1960, 1968–69, 1970–71, 1981–82, 1986–87

- Yugoslav 1. B League

Winners: 1984–85, 1986–87

- Slovenian Republic League

Winners: 1946, 1947

=== European competitions ===
- EuroLeague

Semifinalists: 1961–62
Third place: 1966–67, 1996–97
Final Four: 1967, 1997

- FIBA Saporta Cup

Winners: 1993–94
Semifinalists: 1968–69, 1982–83, 1991–92

=== Regional competitions ===
- Adriatic League

Winners: 2001–02
Runners-up: 2010–11

- Central European League

Winners: 1993, 1994

=== Other competitions ===
- FIBA International Christmas Tournament

Fourth place: 1998

== Notable performances in European and worldwide competitions ==
Season	Achievement	Notes
EuroLeague
1959–60	Quarter-finals	eliminated by Rīgas ASK, 79–95 (L) in Ljubljana and 63–79 (L) in Riga
1961–62	Semi-finals	eliminated by Real Madrid, 105–91 (W) in Ljubljana and 53–69 (L) in Madrid
1962–63	Quarter-finals	eliminated by Spartak ZJŠ Brno, 86–83 (W) in Ljubljana and 72–79 (L) in Brno
1966–67	Final Four	third place in Madrid, lost to Real Madrid 86–88 in the semi-final, defeated Slavia VŠ Praha 88–83 in the third place game
1970–71	Quarter-finals	third place in a group with Ignis Varese, Slavia VŠ Praha and Olympique Antibes
1996–97	Final Four	third place in Rome, lost to Olympiacos 65–74 in the semi-final, defeated ASVEL 86–79 in the third place game
1999–00	Quarter-finals	eliminated 2–1 by FC Barcelona, 67–70 (L) in Barcelona, 71–64 (W) in Ljubljana & 66–71 (L) in Barcelona
2000–01	Quarter-finals	eliminated 2–0 by Kinder Bologna, 79–80 (L) in Bologna and 79–81 (L) in Ljubljana
FIBA Saporta Cup
1967–68	Quarter-finals	eliminated by Slavia VŠ Praha, 64–95 (L) in Prague and 82–70 (W) in Ljubljana
1968–69	Semi-finals	eliminated by Slavia VŠ Praha, 76–83 (L) in Ljubljana and 61–82 (L) in Prague
1982–83	Semi-finals	eliminated by Scavolini Pesaro, 78–97 (L) in Pesaro and 92–107 (L) in Ljubljana
1991–92	Semi-finals	eliminated 2–1 by PAOK, 81–68 (W) in Ljubljana, 61–79 (L) & 86–104 (L) in Thessaloniki
1992–93	Quarter-finals	third place in a group with Efes Pilsen, NatWest Zaragoza, CSKA Moscow, Hapoel Tel Aviv and ASK Brocēni
1993–94	Champions	defeated Taugrés 91–81 in the final of the FIBA European Cup in Lausanne
1995–96	Quarter-finals	6th place in a group with PAOK, Dynamo Moscow, Zrinjevac, Kalev and Nobiles Włocławek

=== The road to the FIBA European Cup victory ===
1993–94 FIBA European Cup

Round	Team	Home	Away
Third	Bye		
Top 12	(North Macedonia) Rabotnički	89–77	80–66
Top 12	(Turkey) Tofaş	87–78	103–90
Top 12	(Spain) Taugrés	86–73	63–67
Top 12	(Switzerland) Fidefinanz Bellinzona	77–62	53–50
Top 12	Croatia Osiguranje	68–76	84–79
Semi-final	(Greece) Sato Aris	84–78	79–83
Semi-final	(Greece) Sato Aris	74–61	79–83
Final	(Spain) Taugrés	91–81	

== Season-by-season records ==
Key

- 2R = Second round
- QF = Quarter-final
- W = Winners
- GS = Group stage
- R32 = Round of 32
- R16 = Round of 16
- T16 = Top 16
- RS = Regular season
- L32 = Last 32

Season	Tier	Domestic league	Pos	Domestic cup	Supercup	Adriatic League		European competitions	
1991–92	1	1. A SKL	1st	Winners	—N/a	—N/a			
1992–93	1	1. A SKL	1st	Winners	—N/a	—N/a		1 European League	2R
1992–93	1	1. A SKL	1st	Winners	—N/a	—N/a		2 European Cup	QF
1993–94	1	1. A SKL	1st	Winners	—N/a	—N/a		1 European League	2R
1993–94	1	1. A SKL	1st	Winners	—N/a	—N/a		2 European Cup	W
1994–95	1	1. A SKL	1st	Winners	—N/a	—N/a		1 European League	GS
1995–96	1	1. A SKL	1st	Round of 16	—N/a	—N/a		1 European League	R32
1996–97	1	1. A SKL	1st	Winners	—N/a	—N/a		1 Euroleague	3rd
1997–98	1	1. A SKL	1st	Winners	—N/a	—N/a		1 Euroleague	R16
1998–99	1	Liga Kolinska	1st	Winners	—N/a	—N/a		1 Euroleague	R16
1999–00	1	Liga Kolinska	3rd	Winners	—N/a	—N/a		1 Euroleague	QF
2000–01	1	Liga Kolinska	1st	Winners	—N/a	—N/a		1 Euroleague	QF
2001–02	1	HYPO Liga	1st	Winners	—N/a	Winners		1 Euroleague	T16
2002–03	1	1. A SKL	2nd	Winners	—N/a	Semifinals		1 Euroleague	T16
2003–04	1	1. A SKL	1st	Runners-up	Winners	Semifinals		1 Euroleague	T16
2004–05	1	1. A SKL	1st	Winners	Winners	Quarterfinals		1 Euroleague	RS
2005–06	1	1. A SKL	1st	Winners	Winners	10th place		1 Euroleague	RS
2006–07	1	Liga UPC Telemach	2nd	Runners-up		9th place		1 Euroleague	RS
2007–08	1	Liga UPC Telemach	1st	Winners	Winners	Semifinals		1 Euroleague	RS
2008–09	1	Liga UPC Telemach	1st	Winners	Winners	9th place		1 Euroleague	RS
2009–10	1	Telemach League	2nd	Winners	Winners	Semifinals		1 Euroleague	RS
2010–11	1	Telemach League	2nd	Winners	Runners-up	Runners-up		1 Euroleague	T16
2011–12	1	Telemach League	2nd	Winners	Runners-up	6th place		1 Euroleague	RS
2012–13	1	Telemach League	2nd	Winners	Runners-up	8th place		1 Euroleague	RS
2013–14	1	Telemach League	2nd	Runners-up	Winners	10th place		2 Eurocup	L32
2014–15	1	Telemach League	5th	Semifinals	Runners-up	5th place		2 Eurocup	L32
2015–16	1	Liga Nova KBM	4th	Quarterfinals		7th place		2 Eurocup	L32
2016–17	1	Liga Nova KBM	1st	Winners		11th place		2 EuroCup	RS
2017–18	1	Liga Nova KBM	1st	Semifinals	Winners	First Division	7th	3 Champions League	RS
2018–19	1	Liga Nova KBM	2nd	Semifinals	Runners-up	First Division	12th	3 Champions League	RS

== Head coaches ==
- (Socialist Federal Republic of Yugoslavia) Boris Kristančič (195?–1967)
- (Socialist Federal Republic of Yugoslavia) Lazar Lečić (1973–1975)
- (Socialist Federal Republic of Yugoslavia) Krešimir Ćosić (1976–1978)
- (Socialist Federal Republic of Yugoslavia) Lazar Lečić (1978–1982)
- (Socialist Federal Republic of Yugoslavia) (Slovenia) Zmago Sagadin (1985–1994)
- (Slovenia) Sergej Ravnikar (1995)
- (Slovenia) Peter Vilfan (1995)
- (Slovenia) Janez Drvarič (1995–1996)
- (Slovenia) Žarko Đurišić (1996)
- (Slovenia) Zmago Sagadin (1996–2002)
- (Slovenia) Tomo Mahorič (2002–2003)
- (Slovenia) Sašo Filipovski (2003–2005)
- (Croatia) Josip Grdović (2005)
- (Croatia) Denis Bajramović (2005)
- (Slovenia) Zmago Sagadin (2005–2006)
- (Slovenia) Tomo Mahorič (2006)
- (Slovenia) Gašper Okorn (2006–2007)
- (Slovenia) Memi Bečirović (2007–2008)
- (Serbia) Aleksandar Džikić (2008)
- (Slovenia) Jure Zdovc (2008–2011)
- (Slovenia) Miro Alilović (2011)
- (Slovenia) Sašo Filipovski (2011–2013)
- (Slovenia) Miro Alilović (2013)
- (Slovenia) Aleš Pipan (2013–2015)
- (Slovenia) Memi Bečirović (2015)
- (Slovenia) Gašper Potočnik (2015–2016)
- (Slovenia) Gašper Okorn (2016–2018)
- (Slovenia) Zoran Martič (2018)
- (Serbia) Saša Nikitović (2018–2019)
- (Slovenia) Jure Zdovc (2019)
