= KK Celje =

Celje
- Leagues: Slovenian Second League
- Founded: 2011; 15 years ago
- History: Celjski vitez 2011–2012
- Arena: 1. OŠ Celje
- Location: Celje, Slovenia
- Team colors: White, blue
- Main sponsor: Cinkarna Celje
- President: Urban Majcen
- Head coach: Vladimir Rizman
- Website: kkcelje.si
Home	Away

Košarkarski klub Celje (English: Celje Basketball Club), commonly referred to as KK Celje or simply Celje, is a Slovenian basketball club based in Celje that competes in the Slovenian Second League.

== Honours ==
- Slovenian Third League
  - Winners: 2013–14
