= Slovenian Basketball League =

Top-level professional men's basketball league in Slovenia

Liga OTP banka
- Founded: 1991; 35 years ago
- First season: 1991–92
- Country: Slovenia
- Confederation: FIBA Europe
- Number of teams: 11
- Level on pyramid: 1
- Relegation to: 2. SKL
- Domestic cup: Slovenian Cup
- Supercup: Slovenian Supercup
- Current champions: Cedevita Olimpija (23rd title) (2025–26)
- Most championships: Cedevita Olimpija (23 titles)
- TV partners: RTV Slovenija; Šport TV
- Website: Official website

The Slovenian Basketball League (Slovene: 1. slovenska košarkarska liga), abbreviated as 1. SKL and known as the Liga OTP banka due to sponsorship reasons, is the top-level professional men's basketball league in Slovenia. The league is operated by the Basketball Federation of Slovenia and consists of eleven clubs. The most successful team is Cedevita Olimpija with 23 titles.

== History ==
The league was founded in 1991, shortly after Slovenia's independence from SFR Yugoslavia. Before the independence, the Slovenian Republic League was played as a second or third level of Yugoslav basketball. Olimpija, Ljubljana, Slovan, ŽKK Maribor, Lesonit, and Branik Maribor were the only Slovenian teams that played in the Yugoslav First Federal League.

=== Sponsored names ===
Since 1991, the league has been named after sponsors on several occasions:

- Liga Kolinska (1998–2001)
- HYPO Liga (2001–2002)
- Liga UPC Telemach (2006–2009)
- Liga Telemach (2009–2016)
- Liga Nova KBM (2016–2019, 2020, 2021–2024)
- Liga OTP banka (2024–present)

== Competition format ==
In the regular season, ten teams play each other three times for a total of 27 games. If a team competes in international competitions (Basketball Champions League, EuroLeague or EuroCup Basketball) and plays at least ten international games per season, that team automatically enters the quarterfinals and does not compete in the regular season. The bottom-placed team of the regular season is relegated to the 2. SKL.

The top seven teams from the regular season advance to the quarterfinals and are joined by a team that did not compete in the regular season. In the quarterfinals and semifinals, a best-of-three playoff is used. The semifinal winners advance to the best-of-five championship finals, with the winners crowned as league champions.

== Current teams ==
As of the 2026–27 season

Team	Location	Arena	Founded
Cedevita Olimpija	Ljubljana	Arena Stožice	2019
ECE Triglav Kranj	Kranj	Planina Sports Hall	1950
GGD Šenčur	Šenčur	Šenčur Sports Hall	1973
Gorica	Nova Gorica	ŠD OŠ Milojke Štrukelj	2011
Hopsi Polzela	Polzela	Polzela Sports Hall	1972
Kansai Helios Domžale	Domžale	Domžale Sports Hall	1949
Krka	Novo Mesto	Leon Štukelj Sports Hall	1948
Perspektiva Ilirija	Ljubljana	Tivoli Hall	1957
Rogaška	Rogaška Slatina	Rogaška Slatina Sports Hall	1998
Šentjur	Šentjur	OŠ Hruševec Hall	1969
Thermana Laško	Laško	Tri Lilije Hall	1969

== Finals ==
Season	Champions	Runners-up	Result	Finals MVP	Champion's coach
1991–92	Smelt Olimpija	Optimizem Postojna	3–0	—N/a	(Slovenia) Zmago Sagadin
1992–93	Smelt Olimpija	Slovenica Koper	3–1	—N/a	(Slovenia) Zmago Sagadin
1993–94	Smelt Olimpija	TAM Bus Maribor	3–0	—N/a	(Slovenia) Zmago Sagadin
1994–95	Smelt Olimpija	Kovinotehna Savinjska Polzela	3–0	—N/a	(Slovenia) Sergej Ravnikar
1995–96	Smelt Olimpija	Interier Krško	3–1	—N/a	(Slovenia) Žarko Đurišić
1996–97	Smelt Olimpija	Kovinotehna Savinjska Polzela	3–1	—N/a	(Slovenia) Zmago Sagadin
1997–98	Union Olimpija	Kovinotehna Savinjska Polzela	3–0	—N/a	(Slovenia) Zmago Sagadin
1998–99	Union Olimpija	Pivovarna Laško	3–0	—N/a	(Slovenia) Zmago Sagadin
1999–00	Krka Telekom	Pivovarna Laško	3–1	—N/a	(Croatia) Ivan Sunara
2000–01	Union Olimpija	Krka Telekom	3–0	—N/a	(Slovenia) Zmago Sagadin
2001–02	Union Olimpija	Krka	3–0	—N/a	(Slovenia) Zmago Sagadin
2002–03	Krka	Union Olimpija	3–2	—N/a	(Croatia) Neven Spahija
2003–04	Union Olimpija	Pivovarna Laško	3–0	—N/a	(Slovenia) Sašo Filipovski
2004–05	Union Olimpija	Geoplin Slovan	3–2	—N/a	(Slovenia) Sašo Filipovski
2005–06	Union Olimpija	Geoplin Slovan	3–2	—N/a	(Slovenia) Zmago Sagadin
2006–07	Helios Domžale	Union Olimpija	3–2	—N/a	(Slovenia) Memi Bečirovič
2007–08	Union Olimpija	Helios Domžale	3–1	—N/a	(Serbia) Aleksandar Džikić
2008–09	Union Olimpija	Helios Domžale	3–0	—N/a	(Slovenia) Jure Zdovc
2009–10	Krka	Union Olimpija	3–2	(Slovenia) Smiljan Pavič	(Serbia) Aleksandar Džikić
2010–11	Krka	Union Olimpija	3–2	(Slovenia) Zoran Dragić	(Serbia) Aleksandar Džikić
2011–12	Krka	Union Olimpija	3–1	(Israel) Afik Nissim	(Slovenia) Aleksander Sekulić
2012–13	Krka	Union Olimpija	3–1	(Slovenia) Matjaž Smodiš	(Slovenia) Gašper Potočnik
2013–14	Krka	Union Olimpija	3–2	(Slovenia) Jaka Klobučar	(Serbia) Aleksandar Džikić
2014–15	Tajfun	Rogaška	3–1	(Slovenia) Dragiša Drobnjak	(Slovenia) Dejan Mihevc
2015–16	Helios Suns	Zlatorog Laško	3–1	(Croatia) Marjan Čakarun	(Croatia) Jakša Vulić
2016–17	Union Olimpija	Rogaška	3–1	(United States) Devin Oliver	(Slovenia) Gašper Okorn
2017–18	Petrol Olimpija	Krka	3–2	(United States) Devin Oliver	(Slovenia) Zoran Martič
2018–19	Sixt Primorska	Petrol Olimpija	3–0	(Croatia) Marjan Čakarun	(Slovenia) Jurica Golemac
2019–20	The season was cancelled due to the COVID-19 pandemic				
2020–21	Cedevita Olimpija	Krka	3–0	(United States) Kendrick Perry	(Slovenia) Jurica Golemac
2021–22	Cedevita Olimpija	Helios Suns	3–0	(Slovenia) Alen Omić	(Slovenia) Jurica Golemac
2022–23	Cedevita Olimpija	Helios Suns	3–1	(United States) Yogi Ferrell	(Slovenia) Miro Alilović
2023–24	Cedevita Olimpija	Kansai Helios Domžale	3–0	(Slovenia) Alen Omić	(Slovenia) Zoran Martić
2024–25	Cedevita Olimpija	Krka	3–1	(Slovenia) Aleksej Nikolić	(Montenegro) Zvezdan Mitrović
2025–26	Cedevita Olimpija	Krka	3–0	(United States) D.J. Stewart Jr.	(Montenegro) Zvezdan Mitrović

=== Titles by club ===
Club	Title(s)	Seasons won
Cedevita Olimpija (Note: Including inherited titles of KK Olimpija.)	23	1992, 1993, 1994, 1995, 1996, 1997, 1998, 1999, 2001, 2002, 2004, 2005, 2006, 2008, 2009, 2017, 2018, 2021, 2022, 2023, 2024, 2025, 2026
Krka	7	2000, 2003, 2010, 2011, 2012, 2013, 2014
Kansai Helios Domžale	2	2007, 2016
Šentjur	1	2015
Primorska	1	2019

=== Finals appearances ===
Num	Team	W	L
31	Cedevita Olimpija	23	8
13	Krka	7	6
7	Kansai Helios Domžale	2	5
1	Šentjur	1	0
1	Primorska	1	0
4	Zlatorog Laško	0	4
3	Hopsi Polzela	0	3
2	Slovan	0	2
2	Rogaška	0	2
1	Postojna	0	1
1	Koper	0	1
1	TAM Bus	0	1
1	Krško	0	1

== Statistical leaders ==
Season	Top rating	PIR	Top scorer	PPG	Top rebounder	RPG	Top assistant maker	APG
2001–02			(Slovenia) Matjaž Tovornik	22.1	(Belarus) Aliaksei Lashkevich	8.7	(Slovenia) Jaka Lakovič	4.2
2002–03			(Slovenia) Slavko Duščak	18.21	(Croatia) Mario Dundović	7.3	(Slovenia) Marko Antonijevič	5.0
2003–04			(Belarus) Aliaksei Lashkevich	19.7	(Bosnia and Herzegovina) Seid Hajrić	9.1	(Slovenia) Miha Čmer	4.7
2004–05			(Croatia) Robert Troha	18.3	(Bosnia and Herzegovina) (Slovenia) Hasan Rizvić	7.1	(Puerto Rico) Andrés Rodríguez	5.7
2005–06			(Slovenia) Sandi Čebular	20.3	(United States) Jeff McMillan	8.4	(Slovenia) Matic Maček	5.0
2006–07			(United States) Jimmie Lee Hunt	18.4	(Switzerland) (Croatia) Sissoko Kabine	8.3	(United States) Jimmie Lee Hunt	4.6
2007–08	(Canada) Dejan Grković	19.19	(Croatia) Miroslav Jurić	19.58	(Canada) Dejan Grković	8.81	(Slovenia) Jure Močnik	4.85
2008–09	(Saint Vincent and the Grenadines) Shawn King	31.26	(United States) Gilbert Goodrich	22.15	(Saint Vincent and the Grenadines) Shawn King	14.79	(Slovenia) Jure Močnik	4.59
2009–10	(Saint Vincent and the Grenadines) Shawn King	27.61	(Slovenia) Sandi Čebular	20.69	(Saint Vincent and the Grenadines) Shawn King	11.30	(Slovenia) Tadej Koštomaj	5.44
2010–11	(United States) Gregg Thondique	22.84	(United States) Benjamin Raymond	17.68	(United States) Gregg Thondique	10.53	(Serbia) Igor Mijajlović	4.68
2011–12	(United States) Travis Nelson	20.88	(United States) Travis Nelson	17.46	(Serbia) Miloš Miljković	8.57	(Slovenia) Luka Rupnik	5.33
2012–13	(United States) Kervin Bristol	20.07	(Slovenia) Sašo Zagorac	17.50	(United States) Kervin Bristol	10.86	(Slovenia) Daniel Vujasinović	5.81
2013–14	(United States) Ousman Krubally	20.03	(United States) Ousman Krubally	17.17	(United States) Ousman Krubally	9.07	(Slovenia) Daniel Vujasinović	7.63
2014–15	(Slovenia) Sašo Zagorac	20.41	(Slovenia) Sašo Zagorac	18.86	(Slovenia) Smiljan Pavič	8.86	(Slovenia) Jan Močnik	6.96
2015–16	(Slovenia) Jan Barbarič	23.20	(Slovenia) Jan Barbarič	18.60	(Slovenia) Smiljan Pavič	8.39	(Slovenia) Matic Rebec	5.59
2016–17	(Slovenia) Igor Tratnik	19.45	(Georgia (country)) Duda Sanadze	17.32	(Slovenia) Jakob Čebašek	8.63	(Slovenia) Daniel Vujasinović	8.29
2017–18	(Slovenia) Smiljan Pavič	19.63	(Slovenia) Blaž Mahkovic	18.97	(Slovenia) Dino Murić	8.27	(Slovenia) Žan Mark Šiško	7.03
2018–19	(Croatia) Davor Konjević	22.37	(Croatia) Davor Konjević	19.96	(South Sudan) Matur Maker	9.59	(Slovenia) Žan Mark Šiško	6.83
2020–21	(Slovenia) Dino Murić	24.00	(Slovenia) Dino Murić	19.21	(United States) Aaron Carver	12.41	(Slovenia) Daniel Vujasinović	8.20
2021–22			(Slovenia) Miha Vašl	21.3	(United States) Dennis Tunstall	10.2	(Slovenia) Miha Vašl	6.4
2022–23			(United States) Tavian Dunn-Martin	20.1	(Slovenia) Dino Murić	8.2	(Slovenia) Daniel Vujasinović	9.4
2023–24			(Bosnia and Herzegovina) Njegoš Sikiraš	17.5	(United States) Jordan Skipper-Brown	9.7	(United States) Anthony Collins	7.3
2024–25			(United States) Josh Thompson	17.6	(Canada) (South Sudan) Kur Jongkuch	8.0	(United States) Tayler Persons	6.4
2025–26			(Slovenia) Blaž Mahkovic	19.7	(Slovenia) Žiga Fifolt	8.0	(Slovenia) Jan Novak	6.2

== Awards ==
=== Regular season MVP ===
Season	Player	Team
1996–97	(Croatia) Teo Čizmić	Postojna
1999–00	(Slovenia) Miljan Goljović	Pivovarna Laško
2007–08	(Canada) Dejan Grković	Rogla Zreče
2008–09	(Saint Vincent and the Grenadines) Shawn King	Hopsi Polzela
2009–10	(Saint Vincent and the Grenadines) Shawn King	Hopsi Polzela
2010–11	(United States) Gregg Thondique	Hopsi Polzela
2011–12	(United States) Travis Nelson	Šenčur
2012–13	(Slovenia) Dejan Mlakar	Slovan
2013–14	(United States) Hugh Robertson	Hopsi Polzela
2014–15	(Slovenia) Saša Zagorac	Zlatorog Laško
2015–16	(Slovenia) Smiljan Pavič	Šenčur
2016–17	(Slovenia) Jakob Čebašek	Hopsi Polzela
2017–18	(Slovenia) Smiljan Pavič	Šenčur
2018–19	(Croatia) Davor Konjević	Šenčur
2019–20	(Slovenia) Dino Murić	Šenčur
2020–21	(Slovenia) Dino Murić	Šenčur
2021–22		
2022–23	(Slovenia) Blaž Mahkovic	Helios Suns Domžale
2023–24	(Slovenia) Miha Cerkvenik	Krka
2024–25	(United States) Josh Thompson	Cedevita Olimpija

== See also ==
- Slovenian Basketball Cup
- Slovenian Basketball Supercup
- Slovenian Basketball All-Star Game
