= KK Kansai Helios Domžale =

Kansai Helios Domžale
- Nickname: Barvarji (The Painters)
- Leagues: Slovenian First League
- Founded: 1949; 77 years ago
- Arena: Domžale Sports Hall
- Capacity: 2,500
- Location: Domžale, Slovenia
- Team colors: White, orange
- Main sponsor: Kansai Helios Group
- President: Peter Orbanič
- Head coach: Jure Močnik
- Championships: 2 Slovenian Leagues; 1 Slovenian Cup; 1 Alpe Adria Cup
- Website: kkdomzale.si
Home	Away

Košarkarski klub Domžale (English: Basketball Club Domžale), also commonly known as Kansai Helios Domžale due to sponsorship reasons, is a men's professional basketball club based in Domžale, Slovenia. The club competes in the Slovenian First League, the top tier of Slovenian basketball. They have won the Slovenian championship in the 2006–07 and 2015–16 seasons. Since 1981, their main sponsor has been the chemical company Helios. Their home arena is Domžale Sports Hall with a capacity for 2,500 spectators.

== History ==
In August 2014, the team changed its name from KK Helios Domžale to Helios Suns.

== Head coaches ==
The following is a list of head coaches since 2005:

- (Slovenia) Memi Bečirović, July 2005 – June 2007
- (Slovenia) Zoran Martič, June 2007 – June 2008
- (Slovenia) Rade Mijanović, June 2008 – December 2008
- (Slovenia) Radovan Trifunović, December 2008 – February 2010
- (Croatia) Ivan Sunara, February 2010 – May 2010
- (Slovenia) Radovan Trifunović, June 2010 – June 2011
- (Slovenia) Zmago Sagadin, June 2011 – May 2014
- (Slovenia) Gregor Hafnar, June 2014 – January 2015
- (Slovenia) Gašper Okorn, January 2015 – December 2015
- (Croatia) Jakša Vulić, December 2015 – January 2017
- (Slovenia) Dejan Čikić, January 2017 – May 2017
- (Serbia) Jovan Beader, May 2017 – November 2018
- (Slovenia) Dejan Jakara, November 2018 – June 2023
- (Slovenia) Damjan Novaković, July 2023 – June 2024
- (Slovenia) Jure Močnik, June 2024 – present

== Honours ==
=== Domestic ===
- Slovenian First League

Winners: 2006–07, 2015–16
Runners-up: 2007–08, 2008–09, 2021–22, 2022–23, 2023–24

- Slovenian Cup

Winners: 2007
Runners-up: 2008, 2011, 2013, 2022, 2023

- Slovenian Supercup

Runners-up: 2007, 2008, 2016, 2022, 2023

=== Regional ===
- ABA League Second Division

Runners-up: 2022–23

- Alpe Adria Cup

Winners: 2015–16
Runners-up: 2016–17

== European matches ==
All results (home and away) list Kansai Helios Domžale's score tally first.

Season	Competition	Round	Club	Home	Away
1992–93	Korać Cup	First round	(Luxembourg) Hiefenech Telekurs	95–68	108–77
1992–93	Korać Cup	Second round	(Russia) Avtodor	55–69	85–87
1993–94	Korać Cup	First round	(Belgium) Leuven ABB	84–84	78–89
1994–95	Korać Cup	First round	(Czech Republic) USK Erpet Praha	77–100	75–106
1997–98	Korać Cup	Group stage (Group M)	(Israel) Maccabi Rishon	67–74	72–91
1997–98	Korać Cup	Group stage (Group M)	(Italy) Aeroporti	60–71	52–80
1997–98	Korać Cup	Group stage (Group M)	(Federal Republic of Yugoslavia) Vojvodina	65–68	73–78
1998–99	Korać Cup	First round	(Bosnia and Herzegovina) Sloboda Dita	64–70	68–75
2010–11	EuroChallenge	Qualifying	(Czech Republic) BK Prostějov	62–70	69–84
2015–16	FIBA Europe Cup	Group stage (Group I)	(Latvia) Ventspils	72–81	62–67
2015–16	FIBA Europe Cup	Group stage (Group I)	(Lithuania) Pieno žvaigždės	71–80	77–86
2015–16	FIBA Europe Cup	Group stage (Group I)	(Poland) PGE Turów	50–58	97–86
2016–17	Champions League	Group stage (Group A)	(France) Monaco	59–63	55–59
2016–17	Champions League	Group stage (Group A)	(Turkey) Banvit	53–60	56–74
2016–17	Champions League	Group stage (Group A)	(Czech Republic) ČEZ Nymburk	57–67	55–85
2016–17	Champions League	Group stage (Group A)	(Greece) Aris	54–62	54–72
2016–17	Champions League	Group stage (Group A)	(Germany) Fraport Skyliners	56–61	62–72
2016–17	Champions League	Group stage (Group A)	(Israel) Ironi Nahariya	60–69	61–76
2016–17	Champions League	Group stage (Group A)	(Denmark) Bakken Bears	78–59	74–68
