= KK Elektra =

Elektra
- Leagues: Slovenian Third League
- Founded: 1948; 78 years ago (as KK Šoštanj)
- Arena: Šoštanj Sports Hall
- Location: Šoštanj, Slovenia
- Team colors: White, blue
- President: Duško Supič
- Head coach: Andrej Božič
- Website: kk-elektra.si
Home	Away

Košarkarski klub Elektra Šoštanj (English: Elektra Šoštanj Basketball Club), commonly referred to as KK Elektra, is a basketball team based in Šoštanj, Slovenia. Founded in 1948, the club plays its home games at Šoštanj Sports Hall. As of the 2026–27 season, Elektra competes in the Slovenian Third League, the third level of Slovenian basketball.

== Honours ==
- Slovenian Fourth League
  - Winners: 2023–24
- Slovenian National Cup
  - Runners-up: 2009
