= KK Koper =

- Founded: 1926; 99 years ago
- Dissolved: 2010; 15 years ago
- Arena: Bonifika Hall
- Location: Koper, Slovenia
- Team colors: Yellow, blue
Home	Away

Košarkarski klub Koper (English: Koper Basketball Club), commonly referred to as KK Koper or simply Koper, was a basketball club based in Koper, Slovenia. After the dissolution of Yugoslavia, the club played in the Slovenian League. The team played their home games at Bonifika Hall.

Their biggest achievement was reaching the Slovenian League championship final in 1992–93, where they were defeated by Olimpija 3–1.

== Names through history ==
- Micom Marcus (1992)
- Slovenica (1993–1994)
- Luka Koper (2007–2010)
