= KD Slovan =

Slovan
- Leagues: Slovenian Second League
- Founded: 1951; 74 years ago
- Arena: Kodeljevo Sports Hall (1,540 seats)
- Location: Ljubljana, Slovenia
- Team colors: Red, white
- President: Gašper Kromar
- Head coach: Anže Trafela
- Website: Official website
Home	Away

Košarkarsko društvo Slovan, commonly referred to as KD Slovan or Slovan, is a basketball team from Ljubljana, Slovenia.

== History ==
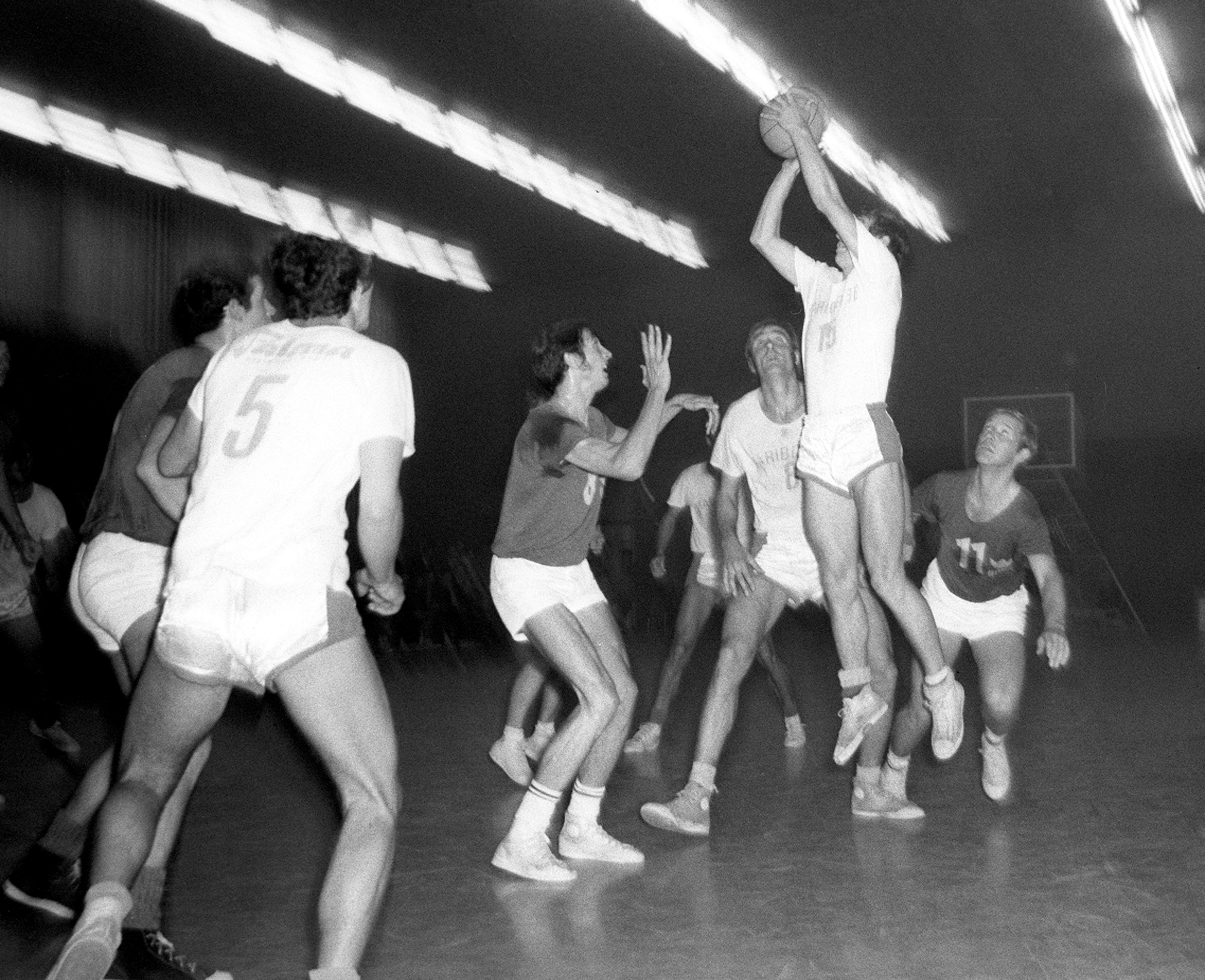
KD Slovan vs. Maribor 66 in 1969

The founding of the club was the idea of Stane Urek, who in 1951 proposed the establishment of a basketball club in Poljane at one of the Ljubljana high schools. The club was named KK Poljane and got its official permission to play on 13 April in the same year. After just two days, they organised their first tournament, at which they invited Rudar Trbovlje and Krka, both playing in the first national league.

The team was also named KK Krim, KK Slavija, KK Odred, and finally KD Slovan – the name they have had until today. After more than 20 years of playing on the basketball court of Poljane Grammar School, they moved to Kodeljevo Hall in the 1974–75 season, where they have been playing ever since.

== Season-by-season records ==
Season	Tier	League	Position	Postseason	Cup	Adriatic League	European competitions
1998–99	1	Kolinska League	7th	—	Quarterfinals	—	—
1999–00	1	Kolinska League	4th	Semifinals	Quarterfinals	—	Korać Cup
2000–01	1	Kolinska League	3rd	Semifinals	Semifinals (3rd)	—	Korać Cup
2001–02	1	Hypo League	4th	Semifinals	Semifinals	11th	Korać Cup
2002–03	1	1. A SKL	3rd	Semifinals	Runners-up	—	FIBA Europe Cup
2003–04	1	1. A SKL	3rd	Semifinals	Semifinals	10th	—
2004–05	1	1. A SKL	3rd	Runners-up	Quarterfinals	10th	—
2005–06	1	1. A SKL	1st	Runners-up	Quarterfinals	9th	—
2006–07	1	1. A SKL	3rd	Semifinals	Quarterfinals	13th	—
2007–08	1	UPC Telemach	5th	—	Quarterfinals	14th	—
2008–09	1	UPC Telemach	5th	—	Quarterfinals	—	—
2009–10	1	Telemach League	8th	—	Semifinals	—	—
2010–11	1	Telemach League	5th	—	Quarterfinals	—	—
2011–12	1	Telemach League	10th	—	Semifinals	—	—
2012–13	1	Telemach League	9th	—	Fourth round	—	—
2013–14	1	Telemach League	12th	Relegated	Fifth round	—	—
2014–15	2	2. SKL	8th	—	Quarterfinals	—	—
2015–16	2	2. SKL	12th	Relegated	Fourth round	—	—
2016–17	3	3. SKL – West	4th	7th (Placement matches 7–18)	Third round	—	—
2017–18	3	3. SKL – East	1st	4th (Championship round)	Second round	—	—
2018–19	3	3. SKL – West	5th	15th (Placement matches 7–18)	Third round	—	—
2019–20	3	3. SKL – West	2nd	2nd (Championship round) (Note: Cancelled after two rounds due to the COVID-19 pandemic.)	Fourth round	—	—
2020–21	3	3. SKL – West	— (Note: Cancelled in October 2020 after three rounds due to the COVID-19 pandemic.)		— (Note: Cancelled in October 2020; only the top 8 teams from the Slovenian top division competed when the competition resumed in May 2021.)	—	—
2021–22	2	2. SKL	3rd	Quarterfinals	Fifth round	—	—
2022–23	2	2. SKL	2nd	Semifinals	Fourth round	—	—
2023–24	2	2. SKL	7th	Quarterfinals	Fourth round	—	—

== Honours ==
- Slovenian First League
  - Runners-up: 2004–05, 2005–06
