= 2016–17 Slovenian Basketball League =

Liga Nova KBM^{1}
- Season: 2016–17
- Duration: 3 October 2016 – 24 May 2017
- Teams: 12
- TV partners: RTV Slovenija; Šport TV

Regular season
- Top seed: Krka
- Season MVP: (Slovenia) Igor Tratnik
- Relegated: Terme Olimia Podčetrtek; LTH Castings; Portorož

Finals
- Champions: Union Olimpija (16th title)
- Runners-up: Rogaška
- Semi-finalists: Krka; Zlatorog Laško
- Finals MVP: (United States) Devin Oliver

Statistical leaders
Points	(Georgia (country)) Duda Sanadze	17.3
Rebounds	(Slovenia) Jakob Čebašek	8.6
Assists	(Slovenia) Daniel Vujasinović	8.3

The 2016–17 Slovenian Basketball League, also known as Liga Nova KBM due to sponsorship reasons, was the 26th season of the Premier A Slovenian Basketball League.

Helios Suns were the defending champions. KK Union Olimpija won their 16th national title, defeating KK Rogaška 3–1 in the final.

== Format ==
The 12 teams of the league play a double-legged round-robin competition where the six first qualified teams will join the playoffs for the title. The four last qualified teams will join the relegation group where the three worst qualified teams will be relegated.

== Teams ==
Location of teams in the 2016–17 Slovenian Basketball League

Sixt Primorska was created after the merge of KOŠ Koper and KK Lastovka and occupied the place of this team in the league.

Club	Location	Venue	Capacity
Helios Suns	Domžale	Komunalni center Hall	2,500
Hopsi	Polzela	ŠD Polzela	1,800
Krka	Novo Mesto	ŠD Leona Štuklja	2,500
LTH Castings	Škofja Loka	ŠD Poden	500
Portorož	Lucija	ŠD Lucija	750
Rogaška	Rogaška Slatina	ŠD Rogaška Slatina	800
Šenčur	Šenčur	ŠD Šenčur	800
Sixt Primorska	Koper	OŠ Koper Hall	660
Tajfun	Šentjur	Dvorana OŠ Hruševec	700
Terme Olimia Podčetrtek	Podčetrtek	ŠD Podcetrtek	
Union Olimpija	Ljubljana	Arena Stožice	12,500
Zlatorog Laško	Laško	Tri Lilije Hall	2,500

Teams that play in the 2016–17 Adriatic League
Teams that play in the 2016–17 Alpe Adria Cup

=== Personnel and kits ===
Team	President	Coach	Captain	Kit manufacturer	Shirt sponsor
Helios Suns	(Slovenia) Aleš Klavžar	(Slovenia) Dejan Čikić	(Slovenia) Luka Vončina	Spalding	Helios
Hopsi Polzela	(Slovenia) Igor Pungartnik	(Slovenia) Boštjan Kuhar	(Slovenia) Uroš Godler	Macron	–
Krka	(Slovenia) Brane Kastelec	(Slovenia) Simon Petrov	(Slovenia) Matej Rojc	Žolna Šport	Krka
LTH Castings	(Slovenia) Janez Gaber	(Slovenia) Rade Mijanović	(Slovenia) Sandi Grubelič	Peak	LTH Castings/Aktiva skupina
Portorož	(Slovenia) Bojan Kocjančič	(Slovenia) Konstantin Subotić	(Slovenia) Boban Vuković	Peak	Splošna plovba
Rogaška	(Slovenia) Kristijan Novak	(Slovenia) Damjan Novaković	(Slovenia) Tadej Ferme	Luanvi	–
Šenčur	(Slovenia) Janko Sekne	(Slovenia) Gregor Vodenik	(Slovenia) Štefan Kosec	Macron	Gorenjska gradbena družba
Sixt Primorska	(Slovenia) Bojan Čad	(Slovenia) Aleksander Sekulić	(Slovenia) Vjekoslav Petrović	Errea	Sixt
Tajfun	(Slovenia) Iztok Špan	(Slovenia) Jurica Golemac	(Slovenia) Milan Sebič	Spalding	Tajfun
Terme Olimia Podčetrtek	(Slovenia) Darko Šket	(Slovenia) Andrej Žakelj	(Slovenia) Boštjan Trupaj	Peak	Terme Olimia
Union Olimpija	(Slovenia) Jani Möderndorfer	(Slovenia) Gašper Okorn	(Slovenia) Mirko Mulalić	Macron	Pivovarna Union
Zlatorog Laško	(Slovenia) Miro Firm	(Slovenia) Aleš Pipan	(Slovenia) Matej Krušič	Luanvi	Pivovarna Laško

=== Managerial changes ===
Team	Outgoing manager	Manner of departure	Date of vacancy	Position in table	Incoming manager	Date of appointment
Krka	(Croatia) Vladimir Anzulović	End of contract	–	Pre-season	(Slovenia) Dejan Mihevc	8 June 2016
LTH Castings	(Slovenia) Aleksander Sekulić	End of contract	–	Pre-season	(Slovenia) Tomaž Fartek	2 September 2016
Primorska	(Slovenia) Andrej Žakelj	End of contract	–	Pre-season	(Slovenia) Aleksander Sekulić	19 August 2016
Tajfun	(Slovenia) Dejan Mihevc	End of contract	–	Pre-season	(Croatia) Krešimir Bašić	9 July 2016
Union Olimpija	(Slovenia) Gašper Potočnik	Mutual consent	29 June 2016	Pre-season	(Slovenia) Gašper Okorn	11 August 2016
Tajfun	(Croatia) Krešimir Bašić	Sacked	18 October 2016	11th (0–2)	(Slovenia) Jurica Golemac	23 October 2016
LTH Castings	(Slovenia) Tomaž Fartek	Mutual consent	27 October 2016	12th (0–3)	(Slovenia) Rade Mijanović	28 October 2016
Terme Olimia Podčetrtek	(Slovenia) Boris Zrinski	Mutual consent	23 December 2016	11th (1–10)	(Slovenia) Andrej Žakelj	29 December 2016
Helios Suns	(Croatia) Jakša Vulić	Mutual consent	30 January 2017	6th (9–5)	(Slovenia) Dejan Čikić	30 January 2017
Krka	(Slovenia) Dejan Mihevc	Sacked	26 February 2017	2nd (15–3)	(Slovenia) Simon Petrov	26 February 2017
Šenčur	(Slovenia) Ernest Novak	Mutual consent	27 February 2017	9th (6–13)	(Slovenia) Gregor Vodenik	2 March 2017

== Regular season ==
Pos	Team	Pld	W	L	PF	PA	PD	Pts	Qualification or relegation
1	Krka	22	18	4	1830	1573	+257	40	Qualification to the group for the title
2	Union Olimpija	22	18	4	1836	1649	+187	40	Qualification to the group for the title
3	Zlatorog Laško	22	17	5	1745	1558	+187	39	Qualification to the group for the title
4	Hopsi Polzela	22	15	7	1740	1635	+105	37	Qualification to the group for the title
5	Helios Suns	22	13	9	1619	1504	+115	35	Qualification to the group for the title
6	Rogaška	22	12	10	1740	1571	+169	34	Qualification to the group for the title
7	Sixt Primorska	22	12	10	1742	1601	+141	34	Qualification to the relegation group
8	Tajfun	22	10	12	1520	1569	−49	32	Qualification to the relegation group
9	Šenčur	22	7	15	1617	1706	−89	29	Qualification to the relegation group
10	Terme Olimia Podčetrtek	22	6	16	1577	1654	−77	28	Qualification to the relegation group
11	LTH Castings	22	3	19	1464	1910	−446	25	Qualification to the relegation group
12	Portorož	22	1	21	1440	1940	−500	23	Qualification to the relegation group

Source: KZS.si

== Second stage ==
=== Group for the title ===
Pos	Team	Pld	W	L	PF	PA	PD	Pts	Qualification
1	Krka	10	8	2	776	703	+73	18	Qualification to the playoffs
2	Rogaška	10	7	3	727	715	+12	17	Qualification to the playoffs
3	Zlatorog Laško	10	5	5	740	738	+2	15	Qualification to the playoffs
4	Union Olimpija	10	5	5	792	748	+44	15	Qualification to the playoffs
5	Hopsi Polzela	10	4	6	710	745	−35	14	
6	Helios Suns	10	1	9	673	769	−96	11	

Source: KZS.si

=== Relegation group ===
Results of the first stage between teams involved counted for this stage.

Pos	Team	Pld	W	L	PF	PA	PD	Pts	Relegation
1	Sixt Primorska	20	17	3	1661	1351	+310	37	
2	Tajfun	20	14	6	1573	1329	+244	34	
3	Šenčur	20	12	8	1562	1456	+106	32	
4	Terme Olimia Podčetrtek	20	10	10	1508	1418	+90	30	Relegated
5	LTH Castings	20	6	14	1381	1622	−241	26	Relegated
6	Portorož	20	1	19	1229	1738	−509	21	Relegated

Source: KZS.si

== Playoffs ==
The Playoffs began on Saturday, May 5, 2017 and concluded at May 24, 2017.

Semifinals
1	Krka	0
4	Union Olimpija	2
2	Rogaška	2
3	Zlatorog Laško	1

Finals
2	Rogaška	1
4	Union Olimpija	3

Slovenian League 2016–17
Champions
Union Olimpija
16th title

== Awards ==
=== Regular season MVP ===
- (Slovenia) Jakob Čebašek (Hopsi)

=== Season MVP ===
- (Slovenia) Igor Tratnik (Zlatorog)

=== Finals MVP ===
- (United States) Devin Oliver (Union Olimpija)

=== Weekly MVP ===
==== Regular season ====
Week	MVP	Club	Efficiency
1	(Slovenia) Urban Durnik	Zlatorog	26
2	(Bosnia and Herzegovina) Nikola Gajić	Primorska	30
3	(Slovenia) Igor Tratnik	Zlatorog	35
4	(United States) Brandon Jefferson	Union Olimpija	29
5	(United States) Victor Robbins	LTH Castings	30
6	(Slovenia) Tomaž Bolčina	Helios Suns	30
7	(Slovenia) Miha Fon	Rogaška	31
8	(Slovenia) Tadej Ferme	Rogaška	31
9	(Slovenia) Jakob Čebašek	Hopsi	38
10	(Slovenia) Daniel Vujasinović	Tajfun	35
11	(United States) Taylor Johns	Rogaška	29
12	(Slovenia) Nejc Zupan	Primorska	31
13	(United States) Devin Oliver	Union Olimpija	33
14	(Slovenia) Dražen Bubnić	Union Olimpija	35
15	(Slovenia) Jakob Čebašek (2)	Hopsi	27
16	(United States) Brandon Jefferson (2)	Union Olimpija	30
17	(Slovenia) Gregor Hrovat	Union Olimpija	34
18	(Slovenia) Jure Pelko	Union Olimpija	25
19	(Slovenia) Jan Rebec	LTH Castings	26
20	(Slovenia) Jan Barbarič	Union Olimpija	33
21	(United States) Devin Oliver (2)	Union Olimpija	30
22	(United States) Devin Oliver (3)	Union Olimpija	30

==== Second round ====
Week	MVP	Club	Efficiency
1	(United States) Devin Oliver	Union Olimpija	21
2	(Slovenia) Matic Rebec	Krka	23
3	(United States) Devin Oliver (2)	Union Olimpija	39
4 ^{c}	(Slovenia) Igor Tratnik	Zlatorog	23
4 ^{c}	(Slovenia) Jan Špan	Zlatorog	23
5	(United States) Darwin Davis	Rogaška	28
6	(Slovenia) Žiga Dimec	Krka	23
7 ^{c}	(United States) Ron Curry	Krka	28
7 ^{c}	(Slovenia) Igor Tratnik (2)	Zlatorog	28
8	(United States) Dominique Elliott	Krka	24
9	(United States) Devin Oliver (3)	Union Olimpija	28
10	(Slovenia) Gregor Hrovat	Union Olimpija	30

Note

^c – Co-MVP's were announced.

== Statistical leaders ==
=== Performance Index Rating ===
Pos	Player	Club	PIR
1	(Slovenia) Igor Tratnik	Zlatorog	19.45
2	(United States) Devin Oliver	Union Olimpija	19.29
3	(Slovenia) Jakob Čebašek	Hopsi Polzela	18.63

=== Points ===
Pos	Player	Club	PPG
1	(Georgia (country)) Duda Sanadze	Primorska	17.32
2	(Slovenia) Igor Tratnik	Zlatorog	16.93
3	(United States) Darwin Davis	Rogaška	16.40

=== Rebounds ===
Pos	Player	Club	RPG
1	(Slovenia) Jakob Čebašek	Hopsi Polzela	8.63
2	(United States) Taylor Johns	Rogaška	8.26
3	(United States) Khaliq Spicer	Tajfun	7.61

=== Assists ===
Pos	Player	Club	APG
1	(Slovenia) Daniel Vujasinović	Tajfun	8.29
2	(Slovenia) Jure Močnik	Helios Suns	6.12
3	(United States) Darwin Davis	Rogaška	5.03
