= 2015–16 Slovenian Basketball League =

2015–16 Liga Nova KBM^{1}
- Season: 2015–16
- Duration: 17 October 2015 – 5 June 2016
- Teams: 12
- TV partners: RTV Slovenija; Šport TV

Regular season
- Top seed: Krka
- Season MVP: (Slovenia) Jan Barbarič
- Relegated: Elektra Šoštanj

Finals
- Champions: Helios Suns (2nd title)
- Runners-up: Zlatorog Laško
- Semifinalists: Krka; Union Olimpija
- Finals MVP: (Croatia) Marjan Čakarun

Statistical leaders
Points	(Slovenia) Jan Barbarič	18.6
Rebounds	(Slovenia) Smiljan Pavič	8.4
Assists	(Slovenia) Matic Rebec	5.6

The 2015–16 Slovenian Basketball League was the 25th season of the Premier A Slovenian Basketball League. On March 24, 2016, league got new sponsorship name, Liga Nova KBM.

The defending champions were Tajfun. From 2. SKL were promoted Škofja Loka and additionally Lastovka, because Grosuplje withdrew from the league. Maribor also withdrew from the league due to bankruptcy.

== Format ==
League consisted of 12 teams, but only nine started the first half of the season, because Olimpija, Krka, and Tajfun played in the regional ABA League and joined the competition in the second half. In the first half of the season, nine teams played each other twice, home and away. First three teams advanced to the second round, where they were joined by three teams competing in the regional league.

== Teams ==
Location of teams in the 2015–16 Slovenian Basketball League

On July 24, 2015 list of teams for 2015–16 season was announced.

Club	Location	Venue	Capacity
Elektra	Šoštanj	ŠD Šoštanj	1,000
Helios Suns	Domžale	Komunalni center Hall	2,500
Hopsi	Polzela	ŠD Polzela	1,800
Krka	Novo Mesto	ŠD Leona Štuklja	2,500
Lastovka	Domžale	OŠ Vencelj Perko Hall	300
LTH Castings	Škofja Loka	ŠD Poden	500
Portorož	Lucija	ŠD Lucija	750
Rogaška	Rogaška Slatina	ŠD Rogaška Slatina	800
Šenčur	Šenčur	ŠD Šenčur	800
Tajfun	Šentjur	Dvorana OŠ Hruševec	700
Union Olimpija	Ljubljana	Arena Stožice	12,500
Zlatorog	Laško	Tri Lilije Hall	2,500

Teams that play in the 2015–16 Adriatic League
Teams that play in the 2015–16 Alpe Adria Cup

=== Personnel and kits ===
Team	President	Coach	Captain	Kit manufacturer	Shirt sponsor
Elektra Šoštanj	(Slovenia) Janko Bukovič	(Slovenia) Dušan Maličević	(Slovenia) Urban Bukovič		Termoelektrarna Šoštanj
Helios Suns	(Slovenia) Aleš Klavžar	(Slovenia) Gašper Okorn	(Slovenia) Željko Zagorac	Spalding	Helios
Hopsi Polzela	(Slovenia) Igor Pungartnik	(Slovenia) Boštjan Kuhar	(Slovenia) Uroš Godler	Macron	–
Krka	(Slovenia) Brane Kastelec	(Bosnia and Herzegovina) Ivan Velić	(Slovenia) Matej Rojc	Žolna Šport	Krka
Lastovka	(Slovenia) Bojan Čad	(Slovenia) Miloš Šporar	(Slovenia) Dragan Pušič	Spalding	vzajemci.si
LTH Castings	(Slovenia) Janez Gaber	(Slovenia) Aleksander Sekulić	(Slovenia) Tomo Čajič	Peak	LTH Castings/Aktiva skupina
Portorož	(Slovenia) Alojz Jurjec	(Slovenia) Konstantin Subotić	(Slovenia) Vjekoslav Petrović	Errea	Splošna plovba
Rogaška	(Slovenia) Kristijan Novak	(Slovenia) Damjan Novaković	(Slovenia) Željko Jotić	Errea	–
Šenčur	(Slovenia) Janko Sekne	(Slovenia) Igor Kešelj	(Slovenia) Štefan Kosec	Macron	Gorenjska gradbena družba
Tajfun	(Slovenia) Iztok Špan	(Slovenia) Dejan Mihevc	(Slovenia) Dragiša Drobnjak	Spalding	Tajfun
Union Olimpija	(Slovenia) Jani Möderndorfer	(Slovenia) Gašper Potočnik	(Slovenia) Saša Zagorac	Macron	Pivovarna Union
Zlatorog Laško	(Slovenia) Miro Firm	(Montenegro) Predrag Milović	(Slovenia) Goran Jurak	Spalding	Pivovarna Laško

=== Managerial changes ===
Team	Outgoing manager	Manner of departure	Date of vacancy	Position in table	Incoming manager	Date of appointment
Krka	(Serbia) Aleksandar Džikić	End of contract	–	Pre-season	(Bosnia and Herzegovina) Ivan Velić	21 June 2015
Union Olimpija	(Slovenia) Memi Bečirovič	End of contract	–	Pre-season	(Slovenia) Gašper Potočnik	10 June 2015
LTH Casting	(Slovenia) Gašper Potočnik	End of contract	–	Pre-season	(Slovenia) Aleksander Sekulić	5 August 2015
Hopsi	(Slovenia) Vladimir Rizman	End of contract	–	Pre-season	(Slovenia) Boštjan Kuhar	2 September 2015
Lastovka	(Slovenia) Dejan Gašparin	End of contract	–	Pre-season	(Slovenia) Miloš Šporar	27 July 2015
Elektra	(Slovenia) Boštjan Kuhar	End of contract	–	Pre-season	(Slovenia) Dušan Maličević	1 October 2015
Helios Suns	(Slovenia) Gašper Okorn	Mutual consent	2 December 2015	4th (3–3)	(Croatia) Jakša Vulić	4 December 2015
Zlatorog	(Slovenia) Predrag Milović	Sacked	3 December 2015	5th (3–2)	(Slovenia) Aleš Pipan	9 December 2015
Lastovka	(Slovenia) Miloš Šporar	Sacked	10 December 2015	7th (1–5)	(Slovenia) Andrej Žakelj	22 December 2015

== Regular season ==
Pos	Team	Pld	W	L	PF	PA	PD	Pts	Qualification or relegation
1	Rogaška	16	15	1	1333	1056	+277	31	Qualification to the group for the title
2	Zlatorog Laško	16	12	4	1339	1123	+216	28	Qualification to the group for the title
3	Helios Suns	16	11	5	1271	1074	+197	27	Qualification to the group for the title
4	Šenčur	16	10	6	1255	1073	+182	26	Qualification to the relegation group
5	LTH Castings	16	9	7	1204	1186	+18	25	Qualification to the relegation group
6	Portorož	16	6	10	1188	1269	−81	22	Qualification to the relegation group
7	Lastovka	16	4	12	1135	1230	−95	20	Qualification to the relegation group
8	Hopsi Polzela	16	4	12	1175	1274	−99	20	Qualification to the relegation group
9	Elektra Šoštanj	16	1	15	1012	1627	−615	17	Qualification to the relegation group

== Second round ==
Key
Qualified for the 1. SKL Playoffs
Qualified for Relegation Playoffs
Relegated to Second Division

=== Group A ===
Pos	Team	Pld	W	L	PF	PA	PD	Pts
1	Krka	10	7	3	785	711	+74	17
2	Zlatorog Laško	10	7	3	772	746	+26	17
3	Union Olimpija	10	5	5	854	799	+55	15
4	Helios Suns	10	5	5	729	779	−50	15
5	Rogaška	10	4	6	734	799	−65	14
6	Tajfun	10	2	8	737	777	−40	12

=== Group B ===
Results between teams in the regular season remained in effect for the second round for Group B.

Pos	Team	Pld	W	L	PF	PA	PD	Pts
7	LTH Castings	20	14	6	1670	1504	+166	34
8	Šenčur	20	13	7	1617	1334	+283	33
9	Lastovka	20	12	8	1529	1401	+128	32
10	Portorož	20	10	10	1550	1515	+35	30
11	Hopsi Polzela	20	10	10	1531	1498	+33	30
12	Elektra Šoštanj	20	1	19	1371	2016	−645	21

== Playoffs ==
The Playoffs began on Thursday, May 11, 2016 and concluded at June 5, 2016.

Quarterfinals
1	Krka	2
8	Šenčur	0
4	Helios Suns	2
5	Rogaška	1
3	Union Olimpija	2
6	Tajfun	1
2	Zlatorog Laško	2
7	LTH Castings	0

Semifinals
1	Krka	1
4	Helios Suns	2
2	Zlatorog Laško	2
3	Union Olimpija	1

Finals
2	Zlatorog Laško	1
4	Helios Suns	3

Liga Nova KBM 2015–16
Champions

Helios Suns
2nd title

== Relegation Playoffs ==
The two bottom teams of the season played against the two best teams from the Slovenian Second Division. All teams played each other at home and away.

Qualified for 2016–17 Slovenian First Division

Pos	Team	Pld	W	L	PF	PA	PD	Pts
1	Hopsi Polzela	6	5	1	500	428	+72	11
2	Portorož	6	4	2	500	457	+43	10
3	Branik Maribor	6	3	3	451	504	−53	9
4	Sežana	6	0	6	430	492	−62	6

== Awards ==
=== Regular season MVP ===
- (Slovenia) Smiljan Pavič (Šenčur)

=== Season MVP ===
- (Slovenia) Jan Barbarič (Portorož)

=== Finals MVP ===
- (Croatia) Marjan Čakarun (Helios Suns)

=== Weekly MVP ===
==== Regular season ====
Week	MVP	Club	Efficiency
1	(United States) Hugh Robertson	Helios Suns	30
2	(Slovenia) Miha Vašl	Zlatorog	25
3	(Slovenia) Matic Rebec	Rogaška	44
4	(Slovenia) Miha Vašl (2)	Zlatorog	30
5	(United States) Cory Remekun	Rogaška	27
6	(Slovenia) Jan Barbarič	Portorož	32
7	(Slovenia) Jan Barbarič (2)	Portorož	32
8	(Slovenia) Željko Zagorac	Helios Suns	31
9	(Slovenia) Smiljan Pavič	Šenčur	45
10 ^{c}	(Slovenia) Željko Zagorac (2)	Helios Suns	25
10 ^{c}	(Slovenia) Simo Atanacković	Helios Suns	25
11	(Slovenia) Smiljan Pavič (2)	Šenčur	40
12	(Slovenia) Jan Barbarič (3)	Portorož	32
13 ^{c}	(Slovenia) Željko Zagorac (3)	Helios Suns	25
13 ^{c}	(Serbia) Bojan Radulović	LTH Castings	25
14	(United States) Cory Remekun (2)	Rogaška	32
15	(Slovenia) Jan Rizman	Hopsi Polzela	32
16	(Croatia) Mladen Primorac	Rogaška	28
17 ^{c}	(Serbia) Milivoje Mijović	Rogaška	32
17 ^{c}	(Slovenia) Matej Krušič	Zlatorog	32
18	(Slovenia) Smiljan Pavič (3)	Šenčur	41

Note

^c – Co-MVP's were announced.

==== Second round ====
Week	MVP	Club	Efficiency
1	(Serbia) Milivoje Mijović	Rogaška	26
2	(Serbia) Sava Lešić	Union Olimpija	22
3	(Serbia) Đorđe Lelić	Helios Suns	24
4	(Serbia) Sava Lešić (2)	Union Olimpija	29
5	(Serbia) Sava Lešić (3)	Union Olimpija	24
6	(Croatia) Marjan Čakarun	Helios Suns	27
7	(Serbia) Stefan Sinovec	Krka	26
8 ^{c}	(United States) Darwin Davis	Rogaška	28
8 ^{c}	(United States) Chris Booker	Zlatorog	28
9	(Croatia) Marjan Čakarun (2)	Helios Suns	31
10	(United States) Chris Booker (2)	Zlatorog	28

Note

^c – Co-MVP's were announced.

== Statistical leaders ==
=== Performance Index Rating ===
Pos	Player	Club	PIR
1	(Slovenia) Jan Barbarič	Portorož	23.20
2	(Slovenia) Smiljan Pavič	Šenčur	21.82
3	(Serbia) Sava Lešić	Union Olimpija	17.94

=== Points ===
Pos	Player	Club	PPG
1	(Slovenia) Jan Barbarič	Portorož	18.60
2	(Slovenia) Robert Abramović	LTH Castings	17.65
3	(Bosnia and Herzegovina) Bojan Djurica	Elektra Šoštanj	16.77

=== Rebounds ===
Pos	Player	Club	RPG
1	(Slovenia) Smiljan Pavič	Šenčur	8.39
2	(United States) Terell Parks	Tajfun	8.31
3	(United States) Chris Booker	Zlatorog Laško	8.11

=== Assists ===
Pos	Player	Club	APG
1	(Slovenia) Matic Rebec	Krka	5.59
2	(Slovenia) Daniel Vujasinović	Zlatorog Laško	5.20
3	(Slovenia) Vjekoslav Petrović	Portorož	4.77
