= 2019–20 Slovenian Basketball League =

Liga Nova KBM
- Season: 2019–20
- Duration: 12 October 2019 – 20 March 2020
- Teams: 10
- TV partner: Šport TV

Regular season
- Relegated: None

Finals
- Champions: None declared

The 2019–20 Slovenian Basketball League, also known as Liga Nova KBM due to sponsorship reasons, was the 29th season of the Premier A Slovenian Basketball League. KK Koper Primorska are the defending champions.

On 12 March 2020, the Basketball Federation of Slovenia temporarily suspended its competitions due to the COVID-19 pandemic. On 20 March, the Basketball Federation canceled definitely its competitions due to the COVID-19 pandemic.

Koper Primorska was the defending champion and as a consequence of the COVID-19 pandemic, the Basketball Federation decided not to recognize any team as the champion for the season.

== Format ==
=== Regular season ===
In the first phase, nine teams will compete in a home-and-away round-robin series (16 games total). Cedevita Olimpija will compete in the second phase. All teams advanced from the regular season to one of two postseason stages, depending on their league position.

=== Second phase ===
The top five teams from the regular season will advance to the championship phase. Cedevita Olimpija will start their competition from this phase. These teams will start the second phase from scratch, with no results carrying over from the regular season. Each team will play a total of 10 games in this phase; as in the regular season, a home-and-away round-robin will be used.

The bottom four teams will enter a home-and-away round-robin mini-league where two best teams qualify to quarterfinals. Each teams plays 9 games in this phase.

==== Playoffs ====
Eight teams will join the playoffs.

== Teams ==
=== Promotion and relegation ===
Terme Olimia Podčetrtek was promoted as the winner of the 2018–19 Second League. The club replaced Ilirija, which finished last in the 2018–19 season.

This is the inaugural season for the newly formed club Cedevita Olimpija (which was created in July 2019 by merging two clubs Olimpija Ljubljana and Cedevita Zagreb) that will take the Olimpija's place in the competition. Also, the club will play in the 2019–20 EuroCup season instead of Cedevita Zagreb.

=== Venues and locations ===
Location of teams in the 2019–20 Slovenian Basketball League

Club	Location	Venue	Capacity
Cedevita Olimpija	Ljubljana	Arena Stožice	12,500
Helios Suns	Domžale	Komunalni center Hall	2,500
GGD Šenčur	Šenčur	ŠD Šenčur	800
Hopsi Polzela	Polzela	ŠD Polzela	1,800
Koper Primorska	Koper	Arena Bonifika	5,000
Krka	Novo Mesto	ŠD Leona Štuklja	2,500
Rogaška	Rogaška Slatina	ŠD Rogaška Slatina	800
Šentjur	Šentjur	Dvorana OŠ Hruševec	700
Terme Olimia Podčetrtek	Podčetrtek	ŠD Podčetrtek	
Zlatorog Laško	Laško	Tri Lilije Hall	2,500

Teams that play in the 2019–20 Adriatic League
Teams that play in the 2019–20 Adriatic League Second Division
Teams that play in the 2019–20 Alpe Adria Cup

=== Personnel and kits ===
Team	President	Coach	Captain	Kit manufacturer	Shirt sponsor
Cedevita Olimpija	(Slovenia) Tomaž Berločnik	(Croatia) Slaven Rimac	(Slovenia) Jaka Blažič	Adidas	Cedevita, Petrol
Helios Suns	(Slovenia) David Kubala	(Slovenia) Dejan Jakara	(Slovenia) Blaž Mahkovic	Spalding	Helios, Triglav
Hopsi Polzela	(Slovenia) Matej Jelen	(Slovenia) Boštjan Kuhar	(Slovenia) Sandi Čebular	Macron	—
Koper Primorska	(Slovenia) Gregor Vuga	(Slovenia) Jurica Golemac	(Slovenia) Alen Hodžić	Erreà	Vehicle Rent
Krka	(Slovenia) Andraž Šuštarič	(Croatia) Vladimir Anzulović	(Slovenia) Jure Balažič	Žolna Šport	Krka
Rogaška	(Slovenia) Kristijan Novak	(Slovenia) Damjan Novaković	(Slovenia) Tadej Ferme	Luanvi	—
GGD Šenčur	(Slovenia) Janko Sekne	(Slovenia) Konstantin Subotić	(Slovenia) Smiljan Pavič	Macron	Gorenjska gradbena družba
Šentjur	(Slovenia) Dušan Debenak	(Slovenia) Saša Dončić	(Serbia) Miloš Pešić	Luanvi	VOC, Tajfun
Terme Olimia Podčetrtek	(Slovenia) Franc Trupaj	(Slovenia) Davor Brečko	(Slovenia) Nejc Strnad	Peak	Terme Olimia
Zlatorog Laško	(Slovenia) Bojan Špiler	(Slovenia) Robi Ribežl	(Slovenia) Tomaž Jereb	Joma	Pivovarna Laško

=== Managerial changes ===
Team	Outgoing manager	Manner of departure	Date of vacancy	Position in table	Incoming manager	Date of appointment
Cedevita Olimpija	First	–	–	Pre-season	(Croatia) Slaven Rimac	8 July 2019
Šentjur	(Croatia) Jakša Vulić	End of contract	–	Pre-season	(Slovenia) Saša Dončić	21 June 2019
Zlatorog Laško	(United States) Chris Thomas	End of contract	–	Pre-season	(Slovenia) Robi Ribežl	13 July 2019
Krka	(Slovenia) Simon Petrov	Mutual consent	5 November 2019	6th (2–3)	(Croatia) Vladimir Anzulović	7 November 2019
Šentjur	(Slovenia) Saša Dončić	Sacked	14 November 2019	7th (2–5)	(Slovenia) Aleš Pipan	14 November 2019
Terme Olimia Podčetrtek	(Slovenia) Davor Brečko	Sacked	14 November 2019	9th (0–5)	(Slovenia) Bojan Lazić	19 November 2019
Koper Primorska	(Slovenia) Jurica Golemac	Parted ways	20 December 2019	1st (10–1)	(Slovenia) Andrej Žakelj	26 December 2019
Cedevita Olimpija	(Croatia) Slaven Rimac	Mutual consent	27 January 2020	/	(Slovenia) Jurica Golemac	27 January 2020

== Regular season ==
=== League table ===
Pos	Team	Pld	W	L	PF	PA	PD	Pts	Qualification
1	Koper Primorska	16	13	3	1395	1128	+267	29	Qualification to championship group
2	Krka	16	11	5	1250	1153	+97	27	Qualification to championship group
3	Helios Suns	16	10	6	1184	1174	+10	26	Qualification to championship group
4	Rogaška	16	10	6	1210	1142	+68	26	Qualification to championship group
5	Hopsi Polzela	16	9	7	1371	1235	+136	25	Qualification to championship group
6	GGD Šenčur	16	9	7	1274	1159	+115	25	Qualification to relegation group
7	Šentjur	16	6	10	1238	1234	+4	22	Qualification to relegation group
8	Zlatorog Laško	16	3	13	1151	1515	−364	19	Qualification to relegation group
9	Terme Olimia Podčetrtek	16	1	15	1036	1369	−333	17	Qualification to relegation group

Source: KZS.si

=== Results ===
Home \ Away	PRI	KRK	HEL	ROG	POL	GGD	SEN	ZLA	POD
Koper Primorska	—	68–64	84–66	76–53	91–77	86–85	82–66	115–73	79–67
Krka	80–81	—	66–73	70–54	84–76	68–66	92–72	104–70	91–60
Helios Suns	60–78	66–72	—	72–67	53–72	66–57	76–73	98–81	80–53
Rogaška	86–83	58–67	75–83	—	82–75	66–57	83–70	91–61	83–48
Hopsi Polzela	85–84	92–65	86–87	86–87	—	71–66	83–62	102–78	96–67
GGD Šenčur	82–80	83–89	67–71	92–53	92–90	—	89–82	95–62	80–73
Šentjur	64–108	96–61	75–63	71–86	85–69	83–90	—	83–50	86–49
Zlatorog Laško	56–102	78–89	90–84	75–99	75–117	66–93	89–76	—	72–69
Terme Olimia Podčetrtek	64–98	60–88	78–86	56–87	77–94	53–80	64–94	98–75	—

Source: KZS.si
Legend: Blue = home team win; Red = away team win.

== Championship group ==
=== League table ===
Pos	Team	Pld	W	L	PF	PA	PD	Pts
1	Cedevita Olimpija	2	2	0	168	146	+22	4
2	Krka	3	1	2	224	236	−12	4
3	Hopsi Polzela	3	1	2	227	243	−16	4
4	Helios Suns	3	1	2	208	228	−20	4
5	Koper Primorska	2	1	1	154	132	+22	3
6	Rogaška	1	1	0	75	71	+4	2

Source: KZS.si

=== Results ===
Home \ Away	COL	HEL	POL	PRI	KRK	ROG
Cedevita Olimpija	—	0	0	0	86–77	0
Helios Suns	69–82	—	0	0	0	0
Hopsi Polzela	0	84–75	—	68–92	0	0
Koper Primorska	0	62–64	0	—	0	0
Krka	0	0	76–75	0	—	0
Rogaška	0	0	0	0	75–71	—

Source: KZS.si
Legend: Blue = home team win; Red = away team win.

== Relegation group ==
=== League table ===
Pos	Team	Pld	W	L	PF	PA	PD	Pts
1	GGD Šenčur	8	7	1	700	588	+112	15
2	Šentjur	8	5	3	682	584	+98	13
3	Zlatorog Laško	8	3	5	567	679	−112	11
4	Terme Olimia Podčetrtek	8	1	7	562	660	−98	9

Updated to match(es) played on 7 March 2020. Source: KZS.si

=== Results ===
Home \ Away	GGD	SEN	POD	ZLA	GGD	SEN	POD	ZLA
GGD Šenčur	—	83–90	90–79	0	—	0	—	0
Šentjur	0	—	0	88–70	—	—	0	0
Terme Olimia Podčetrtek	0	0	—	77–83	0	—	—	—
Zlatorog Laško	0	0	0	—	—	—	0	—

Source: KZS.si
Legend: Blue = home team win; Red = away team win.

== Awards ==
=== Regular season MVP ===
- (Slovenia) Dino Murić (GGD Šenčur)

=== Weekly MVP ===
==== Regular season ====
Week	MVP	Club	Efficiency
1	(United States) Glenn Cosey	Krka	31
2	(Serbia) Marko Jagodić-Kuridža	Koper Primorska	25
3	(Slovenia) Dino Murić	GGD Šenčur	36
4	(Montenegro) Petar Kusovac	Zlatorog Laško	31
5	(United States) Anthony Collins	Hopsi Polzela	24
6	(United States) Randy Haynes	Šentjur	32
7	(United States) Anthony Collins (2)	Hopsi Polzela	34
8^{c}	(Slovenia) Miha Škedelj	Krka	27
8^{c}	(Montenegro) Dragan Bjeletić	Zlatorog Laško	27
9	(Slovenia) Blaž Mahkovic	Helios Suns	32
10	(Slovenia) Jan Kosi	Koper Primorska	33
11	(Slovenia) Jakob Čebašek	Šentjur	28
12	(Slovenia) Blaž Mahkovic (2)	Helios Suns	28
13	(Slovenia) Dino Murić (2)	GGD Šenčur	30
14	(Slovenia) Dino Murić (3)	GGD Šenčur	42
15	(United States) Randy Haynes (2)	Šentjur	30
16	(Kosovo) Gezim Morina	Hopsi Polzela	29
17	(Slovenia) Jan Dornik	Rogaška	33
18	(Montenegro) Dragan Bjeletić (2)	Zlatorog Laško	26

Note

^c – Co-MVP's were announced.

==== Second round ====
Week	MVP	Club	Efficiency
1			
2			
3			
4			
5			
6			
7			
8			
9			
10			

=== MVP of the Month ===
Month	Player	Team	Ref.
2019
October	(Slovenia) Dino Murić	GGD Šenčur	
November	(United States) Anthony Collins	Hopsi Polzela	
December	(Slovenia) Blaž Mahkovic	Helios Suns	

== Statistical leaders ==
=== Performance Index Rating ===
Pos	Player	Club	PIR
1	(Slovenia) Dino Murić	Šenčur	21.39
2	(United States) Antony Collins	Hopsi Polzela	20.16
3	(Slovenia) Jakob Čebašek	Šentjur	18.39

=== Points ===
Pos	Player	Club	PPG
1	(United States) Mikael Hopkins	Cedevita Olimpija	18.50
2	(Slovenia) Jaka Blažič	Cedevita Olimpija	18.00
3	(Slovenia) Blaž Mahkovic	Helios Suns	16.35

=== Rebounds ===
Pos	Player	Club	RPG
1	(Slovenia) Dino Murić	Šenčur	9.06
2	(Montenegro) Dragan Bjeletić	Zlatorog	7.50
3	(Slovenia) Jakob Čebašek	Šentjur	7.22

=== Assists ===
Pos	Player	Club	APG
1	(United States) Antony Collins	Hopsi Polzela	10.26
2	(United States) Codi Miller-McIntyre	Cedevita Olimpija	6.50
3	(Slovenia) Jure Pelko	Helios Suns	4.93

== Slovenian clubs in European competitions ==
Team	Competition	Progress
Cedevita Olimpija	EuroCup	Regular season
