= 2014–15 Slovenian Basketball League =

Telemach League
- Season: 2014–15
- Duration: 11 October 2014 – 28 May 2015
- Teams: 12
- TV partner: RTV Slovenija

Regular season
- Top seed: Krka
- Season MVP: (Slovenia) Sašo Zagorac
- Relegated: Maribor Nova KBM

Finals
- Champions: Tajfun (1st title)
- Runners-up: Rogaška
- Semifinalists: Krka; Helios Suns
- Finals MVP: (Slovenia) Dragiša Drobnjak

Statistical leaders
Points	(Slovenia) Sašo Zagorac	18.9
Rebounds	(Slovenia) Smiljan Pavič	8.9
Assists	(Slovenia) Jan Močnik	7

The 2014–15 Slovenian Basketball League, also known as the 2014–15 Telemach League due to sponsorship reasons, was the 24th season of the Premier A Slovenian Basketball League, the highest professional basketball league in Slovenia. Tajfun won its first title, by defeating Rogaška 3–1 in the finals.

== Regular season ==
Key
Qualified for Group A
Qualified for Group B

Pos	Team	Pld	W	L	PF	PA	PD	Pts
1	Tajfun	20	19	1	1556	1371	+185	39
2	Zlatorog Laško	20	13	7	1492	1423	+69	33
3	Krka	20	12	8	1462	1370	+92	32
4	Grosbasket	20	12	8	1465	1450	+15	32
5	Rogaška	20	11	9	1607	1551	+56	31
6	Šenčur Gorenjska gradbena družba	20	11	9	1454	1435	+19	31
7	Hopsi Polzela	20	9	11	1567	1572	−5	29
8	Helios Suns	20	9	11	1485	1523	−38	29
9	Portorož	20	9	11	1484	1443	+41	29
10	Maribor Nova KBM	20	5	15	1438	1568	−130	25
11	Elektra Šoštanj	20	0	20	1318	1622	−304	20

== Second round ==
Key
Qualified for the 1. SKL Playoffs
Qualified for Relegation Playoffs
Relegated to Second Division

=== Group A ===
Pos	Team	Pld	W	L	PF	PA	PD	Pts
1	Krka	10	8	2	760	694	+66	18
2	Union Olimpija	10	7	3	799	720	+79	17
3	Rogaška	10	5	5	793	809	−16	15
4	Zlatorog Laško	10	5	5	731	790	−59	15
5	Tajfun	10	3	7	717	737	−20	13
6	Grosbasket	10	2	8	672	722	−50	12

=== Group B ===
Results between teams in the regular season remained in effect for the second round for Group B.

Pos	Team	Pld	W	L	PF	PA	PD	Pts
7	Helios Suns	20	15	5	1533	1395	+138	35
8	Portorož	20	13	7	1396	1260	+136	33
9	Šenčur GGD	20	13	7	1495	1379	+116	33
10	Hopsi Polzela	20	10	10	1538	1518	+20	30
11	Elektra Šoštanj	20	4	16	1283	1486	−203	24
12	Maribor Nova KBM	20	5	15	918	1125	−207	25

== Playoffs ==
The Playoffs began on Thursday, May 5, 2015, and concluded at May 28, 2015.

Quarterfinals
1	Krka	2
8	Portorož	0
4	Zlatorog Laško	0
5	Tajfun	2
3	Rogaška	2
6	Grosbasket	1
2	Union Olimpija	0
7	Helios Suns	2

Semifinals
1	Krka	0
5	Tajfun	2
3	Rogaška	2
7	Helios Suns	1

Finals
3	Rogaška	1
5	Tajfun	3

Telemach League 2014–15
Champions

Tajfun
1st title

== Relegation Playoffs ==
The two bottom teams of the season played against the two best teams from the Slovenian Second Division. All teams played each other at home and away.

Qualified for 2015–16 Slovenian First Division

Pos	Team	Pld	W	L	PF	PA	PD	Pts
1	Elektra Šoštanj	6	4	2	502	463	+39	10
2	Hopsi Polzela	6	3	3	527	497	+30	9
3	Lastovka	6	3	3	494	534	−40	9
4	Podčetrtek	6	2	4	473	502	−29	8

== Awards ==
=== Regular season MVP ===
- (Slovenia) Sašo Zagorac (Zlatorog Laško)

=== Season MVP ===
- (Slovenia) Sašo Zagorac (Zlatorog Laško)

=== Finals MVP ===
- (Slovenia) Dragiša Drobnjak (Tajfun)

=== Weekly MVP ===
==== Regular season ====
Week	MVP	Club	Efficiency
1	(Serbia) Đorđe Lelić	Tajfun	35
2	(Slovenia) Matija Trampuš	Grosbasket	30
3	(Slovenia) Jakob Čebašek	Maribor Nova KBM	33
4	(Slovenia) Stanko Sebič	Tajfun	31
5	(Slovenia) Željko Zagorac	Grosbasket	33
6	(Slovenia) Tadej Ferme	Rogaška	31
7	(Slovenia) Domen Bratož	Tajfun	31
8	(Slovenia) Sandi Čebular	Rogaška	32
9	(Slovenia) Žiga Dimec	Rogaška	28
10	(Slovenia) Smiljan Pavič	Šenčur GGD	30
11	(Slovenia) Sašo Zagorac	Zlatorog Laško	30
12	(Slovenia) Željko Zagorac (2)	Grosbasket	30
13	(Slovenia) Sašo Zagorac (2)	Zlatorog Laško	32
14 ^{c}	(Slovenia) Jan Rizman	Hopsi Polzela	29
14 ^{c}	(Slovenia) Ivan Držić	Tajfun	29
15	(Slovenia) Sandi Čebular(2)	Rogaška	30
16	(Slovenia) Smiljan Pavič (2)	Šenčur GGD	36
17	(Slovenia) Sašo Zagorac (3)	Zlatorog Laško	34
18	(Slovenia) Domen Bratož (2)	Tajfun	
19	(Slovenia) Jan Rizman (2)	Hopsi Polzela	42
20	(Democratic Republic of the Congo) Ruphin Kayembe-Tshiabu	Maribor Nova KBM	37
21	(Slovenia) Smiljan Pavič (3)	Šenčur GGD	30
22	(Slovenia) Igor Tratnik	Zlatorog Laško	29

Note

^c – Co-MVP's were announced.

==== Second round ====
Week	MVP	Club	EFF
1	(Slovenia) Nebojša Joksimović	Krka Novo Mesto	29
2	(Slovenia) Alen Omić	Union Olimpija	31
3	(Slovenia) Boban Tomić	Grosbasket	27
4	(Slovenia) Žiga Dimec	Rogaška	26
5	(Slovenia) Sašo Zagorac (1)	Zlatorog Laško	33
6	(Slovenia) Sašo Zagorac (2)	Zlatorog Laško	26
7	(Slovenia) Sašo Zagorac (3)	Zlatorog Laško	35
8	(Bosnia and Herzegovina) Miralem Halilović	Krka Novo Mesto	24
9	(Slovenia) Igor Tratnik	Zlatorog Laško	30
10	(Slovenia) Alen Omić (2)	Union Olimpija	30

== Statistical leaders ==
=== Performance Index Rating ===
Pos	Player	Club	PIR
1	(Slovenia) Sašo Zagorac	Zlatorog	20.41
2	(Slovenia) Smiljan Pavič	Šenčur GGD	19.07
3	(Slovenia) Željko Zagorac	Grosbasket	17.94

=== Points ===
Pos	Player	Club	PPG
1	(Slovenia) Sašo Zagorac	Zlatorog	18.86
2	(Slovenia) Željko Zagorac	Grosbasket	18.18
3	(Slovenia) Sandi Čebular	Rogaška	17.71

=== Rebounds ===
Pos	Player	Club	RPG
1	(Slovenia) Smiljan Pavič	Šenčur GGD	8.86
2	(Slovenia) Željko Zagorac	Grosbasket	8.47
3	(Slovenia) Alen Omić	Union Olimpija	7.92

=== Assists ===
Pos	Player	Club	APG
1	(Slovenia) Jan Močnik	Helios Suns	6.96
2	(Slovenia) Boban Tomić	Grosbasket	5.67
3	(Slovenia) Jure Močnik	Portorož	5.03
