= 2021–22 Slovenian Basketball League =

Liga Nova KBM
- Season: 2021–22
- Duration: October 2021 – March 2022
- Teams: 11
- TV partner: Sport Klub

Finals
- Finals MVP: (United States) Yogi Ferrell

Statistical leaders
Points	(Slovenia) Miha Vašl	21.3
Rebounds	(United States) Dennis Tunstall	10.2
Assists	(Slovenia) Miha Vašl	6.4

The 2021–22 Slovenian Basketball League, also known as Liga Nova KBM due to sponsorship reasons, was the 31st season of the Premier A Slovenian Basketball League.

== Format ==
=== Regular season ===
In the first phase, ten teams compete in a home-and-away round-robin series (18 games total). Teams advanced from the regular season to one of two postseason stages, depending on their league position.

=== Second phase ===
The top five teams from the regular season advanced to the championship phase. Cedevita Olimpija start their competition from this phase. These teams start the second phase from scratch, with no results carrying over from the regular season. Each team plays a total of 10 games in this phase; as in the regular season, a home-and-away round-robin is used.

The last five teams enter a home-and-away round-robin playout-league where two best teams qualify to quarterfinals.

==== Playoffs ====
Eight teams join the playoffs.

== Teams ==
Nutrispoint Ilirija was promoted.

=== Venues and locations ===
Location of teams in the 2021–22 Slovenian Basketball League

Club	Location	Venue	Capacity
Cedevita Olimpija	Ljubljana	Arena Stožice	12,500
Helios Suns	Domžale	Komunalni center Hall	2,500
GGD Šenčur	Šenčur	ŠD Šenčur	800
Hopsi	Polzela	ŠD Polzela	1,800
Krka	Novo Mesto	ŠD Leona Štuklja	2,500
Nutrispoint Ilirija	Ljubljana	Tivoli Hall	7,000
Rogaška	Rogaška Slatina	ŠD Rogaška Slatina	800
Šentjur	Šentjur	Dvorana OŠ Hruševec	700
Terme Olimia	Podčetrtek	ŠD Podčetrtek	
ECE Triglav	Kranj	Planina Sports Hall	800
Zlatorog	Laško	Tri Lilije Hall	2,500

Teams that play in the 2021–22 Adriatic League
Teams that play in the 2021–22 Adriatic League Second Division
Teams that play in the 2021–22 Alpe Adria Cup

== Regular season ==
=== League table ===
Pos	Team	Pld	W	L	PF	PA	PD	Pts	Qualification
1	Krka	18	16	2	1583	1338	+245	34	Qualification to championship group
2	Helios Suns	18	15	3	1442	1262	+180	33	Qualification to championship group
3	GGD Šenčur	18	13	5	1540	1408	+132	31	Qualification to championship group
4	Ilirija	18	11	7	1457	1363	+94	29	Qualification to championship group
5	Terme Olimia	18	10	8	1440	1437	+3	28	Qualification to championship group
6	Rogaška	18	9	9	1414	1435	−21	27	Qualification to relegation group
7	Šentjur	18	6	12	1499	1546	−47	24	Qualification to relegation group
8	Hopsi Polzela	18	6	12	1504	1594	−90	24	Qualification to relegation group
9	ECE Triglav	18	2	16	1294	1526	−232	20	Qualification to relegation group
10	Zlatorog Laško	18	2	16	1297	1561	−264	20	Qualification to relegation group

Source: Flashscore

== Championship group ==
=== League table ===
Pos	Team	Pld	W	L	PF	PA	PD	Pts	Qualification
1	Helios Suns	10	7	3	813	723	+90	17	Qualification to playoffs
2	GGD Šenčur	10	7	3	772	734	+38	17	Qualification to playoffs
3	Krka	10	6	4	869	791	+78	16	Qualification to playoffs
4	Ilirija	10	5	5	847	849	−2	15	Qualification to playoffs
5	Terme Olimia	10	3	7	793	889	−96	13	Qualification to playoffs
6	Cedevita Olimpija	10	2	8	742	850	−108	12	Qualification to playoffs

Source: Flashscore

== Relegation group ==
=== League table ===
Pos	Team	Pld	W	L	PF	PA	PD	Pts	Qualification or relegation
1	Rogaška	26	15	11	2136	2095	+41	41	Qualification to playoffs
2	Šentjur	26	12	14	2112	2099	+13	38	Qualification to playoffs
3	Hopsi Polzela	26	9	17	2182	2304	−122	35	
4	Zlatorog Laško	26	5	21	1901	2182	−281	31	Relegation
5	ECE Triglav	26	4	22	1805	2110	−305	30	Relegation

Source: Flashscore

== Playoffs ==
Seeded teams played at home games 1, 3 and, in the finals, 5.

=== Bracket ===
Quarter-finals
Helios Suns	2
Šentjur	1
Ilirija	1
Terme Olimia	2
Krka	0
Cedevita Olimpija	2
GGD Šenčur	0
Rogaška	2

Semi-finals
Helios Suns	2
Terme Olimia	1
Cedevita Olimpija	2
Rogaška	0

Final
Helios Suns	0
Cedevita Olimpija	3

== Awards ==
=== Finals MVP ===
- (United States) Yogi Ferrell (Cedevita Olimpija)

== Slovenian clubs in European competitions ==
Team	Competition	Progress
Cedevita Olimpija	EuroCup	Quarterfinals
