= 2013–14 Slovenian Basketball League =

1. A SKL
- Season: 2013–14
- Duration: 19 October 2013 – 31 May 2014
- Teams: 12
- TV partner(s): RTV Slovenija

Regular season
- Top seed: Krka
- Season MVP: (United States) Ousman Krubally
- Relegated: Slovan

Finals
- Champions: Krka (7th title)
- Runners-up: Union Olimpija
- Semifinalists: Helios Domžale; Hopsi Polzela
- Finals MVP: (Slovenia) Jaka Klobučar

Statistical leaders
Points	(United States) Ousman Krubally	17.7
Rebounds	(United States) Ousman Krubally	9.1
Assists	(Slovenia) Daniel Vujasinović	7.6

The 2013–14 Slovenian Basketball League, also known as the 2013–14 Telemach League due to sponsorship reasons, was the 23rd season of the Premier A Slovenian Basketball League, the highest professional basketball league in Slovenia. Krka won its seventh national championship, and its fifth in a row.

== Regular season ==
Key
Qualified for Group A
Qualified for Group B

Pos	Team	Pld	W	L	PF	PA	PD	Pts
1	Helios Domžale	18	15	3	1410	1215	+195	33
2	Rogaška	18	14	4	1373	1220	+153	32
3	Hopsi Polzela	18	12	6	1431	1336	+95	30
4	Zlatorog Laško	18	10	8	1485	1438	+47	28
5	Grosuplje	18	10	8	1360	1279	+81	28
6	Portorož	18	7	11	1312	1382	−70	25
7	Maribor Nova KBM	18	6	12	1288	1374	−86	24
8	Slovan	18	6	12	1296	1410	−114	24
9	Elektra Šoštanj	18	6	12	1296	1410	−114	24
10	Tajfun	18	5	13	1225	1383	−158	23

== Second round ==
Key
Qualified for the 1. A SKL Playoffs
Qualified for Relegation Playoffs
Relegated to Second Division

=== Group A ===
Pos	Team	Pld	W	L	PF	PA	PD	Pts
1	Krka	10	8	2	796	726	+70	18
2	Union Olimpija	10	6	4	803	690	+113	16
3	Helios Domžale	10	6	4	743	694	+49	16
4	Hopsi Polzela	10	4	6	721	772	−51	14
5	Zlatorog Laško	10	4	6	664	768	−104	14
6	Rogaška	10	2	8	712	789	−77	12

=== Group B ===
Results between teams in the regular season remained in effect for the second round for Group B.

Pos	Team	Pld	W	L	PF	PA	PD	Pts
7	Grosuplje	28	16	12	2144	2013	+131	44
8	Portorož	28	12	16	2058	2130	−72	40
9	Maribor Nova KBM	28	11	17	2055	2161	−106	39
10	Elektra Šoštanj	28	11	17	2021	2155	−134	39
11	Tajfun	28	10	18	1978	2137	−159	38
12	Slovan	28	9	19	2007	2157	−150	37

== Playoffs ==
Quarterfinals
1	Krka Novo Mesto	2
8	Portorož	0
4	Hopsi Polzela	2
5	Zlatorog Laško	1
2	Union Olimpija	2
7	Grosuplje	0
3	Helios Domžale	2
6	Rogaška	1

Semifinals
1	Krka	2
4	Hopsi Polzela	1
2	Union Olimpija	2
3	Helios Domžale	1

Finals
1	Krka	3
2	Union Olimpija	2

Telemach League 2013–14
Champions

Krka
7th title

== Relegation Playoffs ==
Qualified for 2014–15 Slovenian First Division

The two bottom teams of the season played against the two best teams from the Slovenian Second Division. All teams played each other at home and away.

Pos	Team	Pld	W	L	PF	PA	PD	Pts
1	Tajfun	6	5	1	511	414	+97	11
2	Elektra Šoštanj	6	5	1	486	434	+52	11
3	Lastovka	6	2	4	434	476	−42	8
4	Plama Pur	6	0	6	388	495	−107	6

== Awards ==
=== Regular Season MVP ===
- (United States) Hugh Robertson (Hopsi Polzela)

=== Season MVP ===
- (United States) Ousman Krubally (Grosuplje)

=== Finals MVP ===
- (Slovenia) Jaka Klobučar (Krka Novo Mesto)

=== Weekly MVP ===
==== Regular season ====
Week	MVP	Club
1	(United States) Ousman Krubally	Grosuplje
2	(Bosnia and Herzegovina) Milan Milošević	Zlatorog Laško
3 ^{c}	(Slovenia) Goran Jagodnik	Hopsi Polzela
3 ^{c}	(Slovenia) Goran Jurak	Zlatorog Laško
4	(Bosnia and Herzegovina) Emir Zimić	Tajfun
5	(United States) Ousman Krubally (2)	Grosuplje
6	(Slovenia) Matej Krušič	Grosuplje
7	(United States) Hugh Robertson	Hopsi Polzela
8 ^{c}	(Slovenia) Miha Lapornik	Zlatorog Laško
8 ^{c}	(United States) Ousman Krubally (3)	Grosuplje
9	(United States) Hugh Robertson (2)	Hopsi Polzela
10	(Bosnia and Herzegovina) Milan Milošević (2)	Zlatorog Laško
11	(United States) Hugh Robertson (3)	Hopsi Polzela
12	(Slovenia) Sandi Čebular	Rogaška
13	(Croatia) Igor Marić	Helios Domžale
14	(Bosnia and Herzegovina) Ramo Rizvić	Maribor
15	(Slovenia) Miha Fon	Maribor
16	(Slovenia) Jure Močnik	Hopsi Polzela
17	(Slovenia) Stipe Modrić	Slovan
18	(Cameroon) Alexis Wangmene	Hopsi Polzela

Note

^c – Co-MVP's were announced.

==== Second round ====
Week	MVP	Club
1	(Croatia) Zvonko Buljan	Krka Novo Mesto
2	(Serbia) Đorđe Majstorović	Helios Domžale
3	(Serbia) Milivoje Mijović	Rogaška
4	(Slovenia) Simo Atanacković	Hopsi Polzela
5	(Slovenia) Luka Lapornik	Krka Novo Mesto
6	(Slovenia) Goran Jurak	Zlatorog Laško
7	(Lithuania) Deividas Gailius	Union Olimpija
8	(Bosnia and Herzegovina) Milan Milošević	Zlatorog Laško
9	(Croatia) Jozo Brkić	Rogaška
10	(Slovenia) Jaka Klobučar	Krka Novo Mesto

== Statistical leaders ==
=== Performance Index Rating ===
Pos	Player	Club	PIR
1	(United States) Ousman Krubally	Grosuplje	20.03
2	(Slovenia) Daniel Vujasinović	Hopsi Polzela	18.16
3	(Bosnia and Herzegovina) Milan Milošević	Zlatorog	16.97

=== Points ===
Pos	Player	Club	PPG
1	(United States) Ousman Krubally	Grosuplje	17.17
2	(Slovenia) Goran Jagodnik	Hopsi Polzela	15.09
3	(Bosnia and Herzegovina) Milan Milošević	Zlatorog	14.13

=== Rebounds ===
Pos	Player	Club	RPG
1	(United States) Ousman Krubally	Grosuplje	9.07
2	(Bosnia and Herzegovina) Milan Milošević	Zlatorog	8.61
3	(Slovenia) Dino Murić	Union Olimpija	8.50

=== Assists ===
Pos	Player	Club	APG
1	(Slovenia) Daniel Vujasinović	Hopsi Polzela	7.63
2	(United States) Kaylon Williams	Grosuplje	6.76
2	(Slovenia) Bojan Jovanović	Zlatorog	4.65
