= Slovenian Basketball All-Star Game =

- Status: Inactive
- Inaugurated: 1991-92
- Most recent: 2015-16
- Organizer: Slovenian Basketball League

The Slovenian Basketball All-Star Game is an annual basketball event in Slovenia, organised by the Slovenian Basketball League. It was established during the 1991-92 season, after the creation of the Slovenian Basketball League.

== List of games ==
Bold: Team that won the game.

Season	Date / Location	Team 1	Score	Team 2	MVP	Club
1992					(Slovenia) Slavko Kotnik	KK Olimpija
1994					(Slovenia) Boris Gorenc	KK Olimpija
1998-99					(Slovenia) Matjaž Smodiš	KK Krka
2001-02	26 December 2001	**East**	**104**-86	West	(United States) Bennett Davison	KK Krka
2003-04	3 April 2004, Ljubljana	**Domestic**	**118**-105	Import	(Slovenia) Miha Zupan	Geoplin Slovan
2004-05		Domestic	121-**122**	**Import**	(Slovenia) Saso Ozbolt	KK Olimpija
2005-06	27 December 2005	East	113-**118**	**West**		
2006-07		**East**	**105**-96	West	(Slovenia) Smiljan Pavic	Helios Domžale
2007-08		**East**	defeated	West	(Slovenia) Jure Balazic	KK Krka
2008-09	26 December 2009	East	102-**115**	**West**	(Saint Vincent and the Grenadines) Shawn King	KD Hopsi Polzela
2009-10		**East**	**108**-84	West	(Slovenia) Gasper Vidmar	KK Olimpija
2010-11	2 January 2011	**Domestic**	**118**-105	Import	(United States) Kevinn Pinkney	KK Olimpija
2011-12	17 January 2012	Domestic	88-**89**	**Foreigners**	(United States) (Ivory Coast) Deon Thompson	KK Olimpija
2012-13	30 December 2012	**Edo Muric's Team**	**72**-58	Jaka Blazic's Team	(Slovenia) Jaka Blazic	KK Olimpija
2013-14	29 December 2013	**Nebojsa Joksimovic's Team**	**96**-91	Edo Muric's Team	(United States) (Gabon) Ousman Krubally	KK Grosuplje
2014-15	29 December 2014	**Blaz Mahkovic 's Team**	**122**-120	Alen Omic's Team	(United States) Chris Booker	KK Krka
2015-16	29 December 2015	**Ziga Dimec 's Team**	**126**-117	Matic Rebec's Team	(Slovenia) Ziga Dimec	KK Krka

== Three-Point Shoot Contest ==
Year	Player	Team
2001-02	(Slovenia) Slavko Duscak	Pivovarna Lasko
2002-03	(Slovenia) Slavko Duscak (2)	Pivovarna Lasko
2003-04	(Slovenia) Nejc Strnad	KK Olimpija
2004-05	(Slovenia) Gregor Auer	AKK Branik Maribor
2005-06		
2006-07	(Slovenia) Zan Vrecko	Pivovarna Lasko
2007-08	(Slovenia) Robert Troha	Helios Domžale
2008-09	(United States) Nicholas Jacobson	Helios Domžale
2009-10	(Slovenia) Maj Kovačevič	KK Krka
2010-11	(United States) Kevinn Pinkney	KK Olimpija
2011-12		
2012-13	(Slovenia) Robert Abramovic	LTH Castings Mercator
2013-14		
2014-15	(United States) Ceola Clark III	
2015-16	(Slovenia) Miha Vasl	Pivovarna Lasko

== Slam-Dunk winners ==
Year	Player	Team
1993	(Slovenia) Boris Gorenc	KK Olimpija
1994	(Slovenia) Marko Milic	KK Olimpija
1995	(Slovenia) Marko Milic (2)	KK Olimpija
1996	(Slovenia) Boris Gorenc (2)	KK Olimpija
1997	(Slovenia) Marko Tusek	KK Olimpija
2001-02	(United States) Bennett Davison	KK Krka
2003-04	(Slovenia) Miha Zupan	Geoplin Slovan
2004-05	(Slovenia) Saso Ozbolt	KK Olimpija
2005-06		
2006-07	(Slovenia) Dejan Cigoja	KD Slovan
2007-08	(Slovenia) Milan Sebic	Alpos Sentjur
2008-09	(United States) Terrence Hundley	KD Hopsi Polzela
2009-10	(United States) Gregg Thondique	KD Hopsi Polzela
2010-11	(Latvia) Davis Bertans	KK Olimpija
2011-12		
2012-13	(Slovenia) Nemanja Barac	Rogaska Crystal
2013-14		
2014-15	(United States) Kyle Casey	Helios Domžale
2015-16		

== Topscorers ==
Year	Player	Points	Team
1998-99	(Slovenia) Matjaž Smodiš	31	KK Krka
2001-02	(United States) Bennett Davison	15	KK Krka
2003-04	(Slovenia) Miha Zupan	21	Geoplin Slovan
2004-05	(Slovenia) Saso Ozbolt (Croatia) Marino Baždarić	25	KK Olimpija; KK Olimpija
2005-06	(Slovenia) Saša Dončić	21	Geoplin Slovan
2006-07	(Slovenia) Smiljan Pavic	27	Helios Domžale
2007-08	(Slovenia) Jure Balazic	27	KK Krka
2008-09	(Saint Vincent and the Grenadines) Shawn King	33	KD Hopsi Polzela
2009-10	(Slovenia) Gasper Vidmar	25	KK Olimpija
2010-11	(United States) Chris Booker	22	KK Krka
2011-12	(United States) (Ivory Coast) Deon Thompson	24	KK Krka
2012-13	(Slovenia) Jaka Blazic	18	KK Olimpija
2013-14	(United States) (Gabon) Ousman Krubally	23	KK Grosuplje
2014-15	(United States) Chris Booker	37	KK Krka
2015-16	(Slovenia) Ziga Dimec	31	KK Krka

== Players with most appearances ==
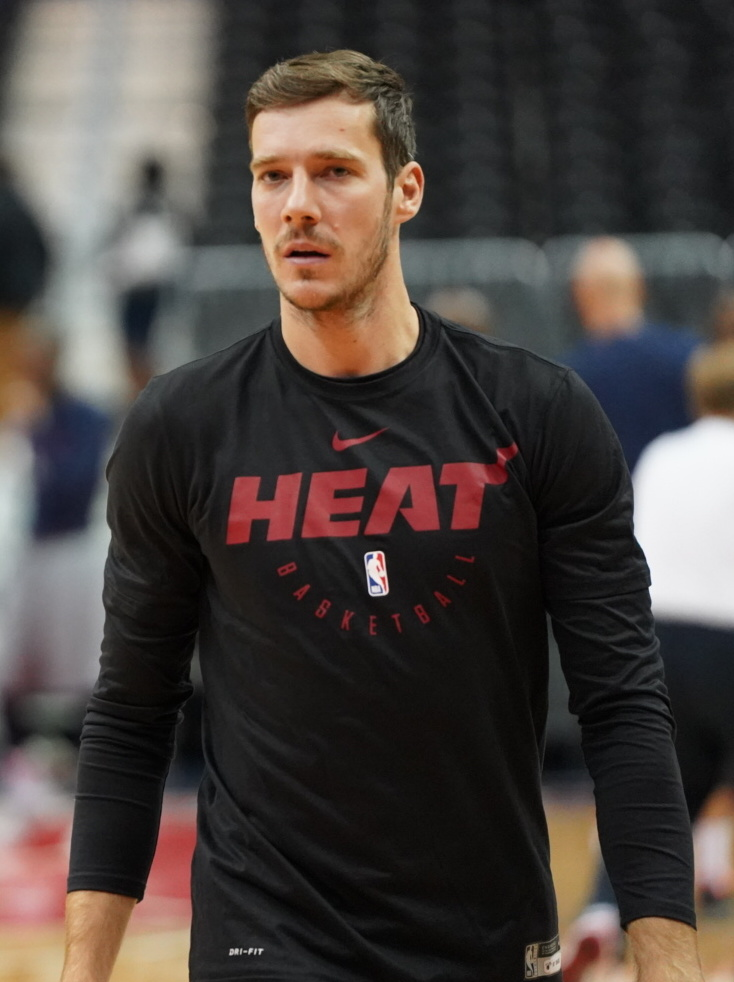
Goran Dragic played in the 2006 edition

Player	All-Star	Editions	Notes
(Slovenia) Saša Dončić	6	2001, 2003, 2004, 2005, 2006 and 2007	
(Slovenia) Goran Jurak	5	1999, 2000, 2001, 2002 and 2003	
(Slovenia) Slavko Duščak	4	2000, 2001, 2002 and 2003	Won the 2002 and 2003 All Star Game 3pts
(North Macedonia) Vlado Ilievski	5	2003, 2009, 2010 and 2011	
(Slovenia) Sašo Ožbolt	4	2004, 2005, 2009 and 2011	2005 Slovenian All Star Game MVP
(Slovenia) Boris Gorenc	4	1993, 1994, 1995 and 1996	1994 Slovenian All Star Game MVP
(Slovenia) Jaka Blažič	3	2009, 2012 and 2013	2013 Slovenian All Star Game MVP
(Slovenia) Alen Omić	3	2012, 2014 and 2015	
(Slovenia) Sani Bečirovič	3	1999, 2000 and 2001	
(Slovenia) Dragiša Drobnjak	3	2001, 2004 and 2005	
(Slovenia) Slavko Kotnik	2	1992 and 2000	1992 Slovenian All Star Game MVP

== Distinctions ==
=== FIBA Hall of Fame ===
- (Slovenia) Jure Zdovc

=== EuroLeague Hall of Fame ===
- (Lithuania) Sarunas Jasikevicius

== See also ==
- Adriatic Basketball Association All-Star Game
