= Aleksander Sekulić =

Slovenian basketball coach

- Sekulić with FC Barcelona in 2026

FC Barcelona
- Position: Head coach
- League: Liga ACB; EuroLeague

Personal information
- Born: 24 February 1978 (age 48) Ljubljana, SR Slovenia, SFR Yugoslavia
- Coaching career: 1996–present

Career history

Coaching
- 2004–2007: Geoplin Slovan (assistant)
- 2007–2008: Geoplin Slovan
- 2008–2009: Triglav Kranj
- 2009–2010: Luka Koper
- 2010–2011: Krka (assistant)
- 2011–2013: Krka
- 2013–2015: Krka (assistant)
- 2015–2016: LTH Castings
- 2016–2017: Sixt Primorska
- 2017–2021: ERA Nymburk (assistant)
- 2020–present: Slovenia
- 2021–2022: ERA Nymburk
- 2022–2024: Lokomotiv Kuban
- 2025–2026: Zenit Saint Petersburg
- 2026: Dubai Basketball
- 2026–present: FC Barcelona

Career highlights
- As head coach: ABA League champion (2026); Slovenian League champion (2012); Slovenian Supercup winner (2013); Czech Republic League champion (2022); As assistant coach: FIBA EuroChallenge winner (2011); 2× Slovenian League champion (2011, 2014); 3× Slovenian Supercup winner (2011, 2012, 2015); 2× Slovenian Cup winner (2014, 2015); 2× Czech League winner (2018, 2019); 3× Czech Cup winner (2018, 2019, 2020)
Medals
Men's basketball
Assistant coach for Slovenia
EuroBasket
Gold medal – first place	2017 Turkey	Team

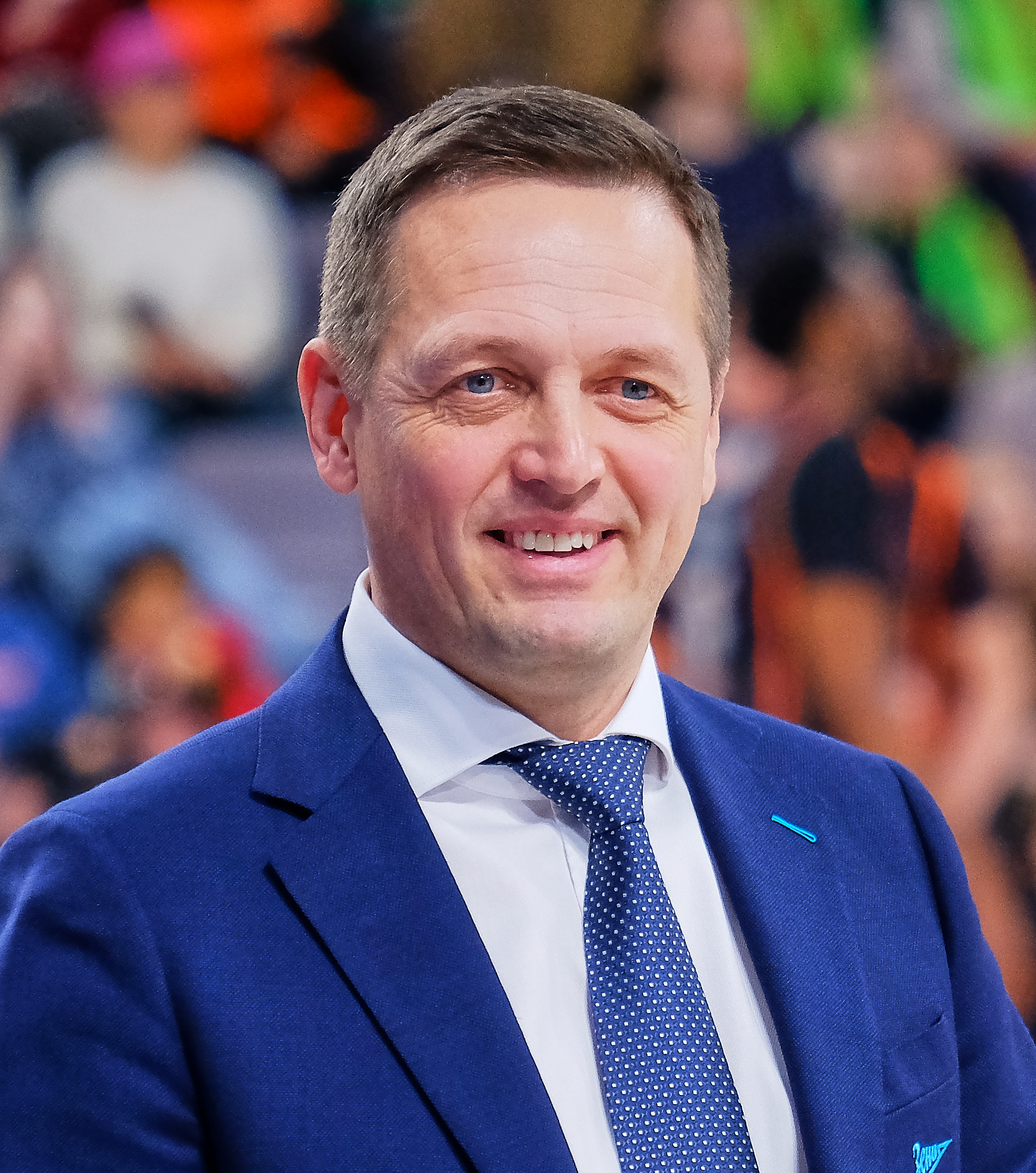
Sekulić with Zenit Saint Petersburg in 2025

Aleksander Sekulić (born 24 February 1978) is a Slovenian professional basketball coach who is currently the head coach for FC Barcelona of the Spanish Liga ACB and the EuroLeague, and the Slovenian men's national team.

== Club coaching career ==
Sekulić started coaching in his native Slovenia, working his way up from the youth system of KD Slovan. In 2011, he became the head coach of KK Krka, with which he would win the 2011–12 Slovenian Championship and the 2013 Slovenian Supercup.

In 2017, Sekulić joined ERA Nymburk of the Czech National Basketball League as an assistant coach. He extended his contract with Nymburk in June 2020. In June 2021, he took over as head coach after the departure of Oren Amiel. After winning the 2021–22 NBL title, Sekulić parted ways with the Czechs in July 2022.

On 20 July 2022, Sekulić was appointed as head coach for Lokomotiv Kuban of the VTB United League.

On 24 June 2025, Sekulić was appointed as head coach for Zenit Saint Petersburg of the VTB United League in a one-season deal with an extension option.

On 13 April 2026, Sekulić was appointed as head coach for Dubai Basketball of the ABA League and the EuroLeague until the end of the season, taking over from Jurica Golemac. He made his EuroLeague in the last game of the 2025–26 EuroLeague regular season, a home loss against Valencia. Sekulić led Dubai to its first ABA League title after beating Partizan in the 2025–26 ABA League Finals.

On 22 July 2026, he signed a two-year contract to become the new head coach for FC Barcelona of the Liga ACB and the EuroLeague.

== National team career ==
Sekulić first joined the Slovenian men's national team as an assistant coach in 2017. On 6 November 2020, he became the national team's head coach, taking over from Rado Trifunović. In January 2026, he signed a contract extension to remain the national team's coach for two more years.

== Head coaching record ==
=== EuroLeague ===
Team	Year	G	W	L	W–L%	Result
Dubai Basketball	2025–26	1	0	1	.000	Eliminated in the regular season
Career		1	0	1	.000	

=== Domestic Leagues ===
Team	Year	G	W	L	W–L%	Result
KK Krka	2012–13	15	13	2	.867	Won championship
LTH Castings	2015–16	36	23	13	.639	
KK Primorska	2016–17	42	29	13	.690	
ERA Nymburk	2021–22	36	35	1	.972	Won championship
Career		129	100	29	.775	
