= Jaka Klobučar =

Slovenian basketball player

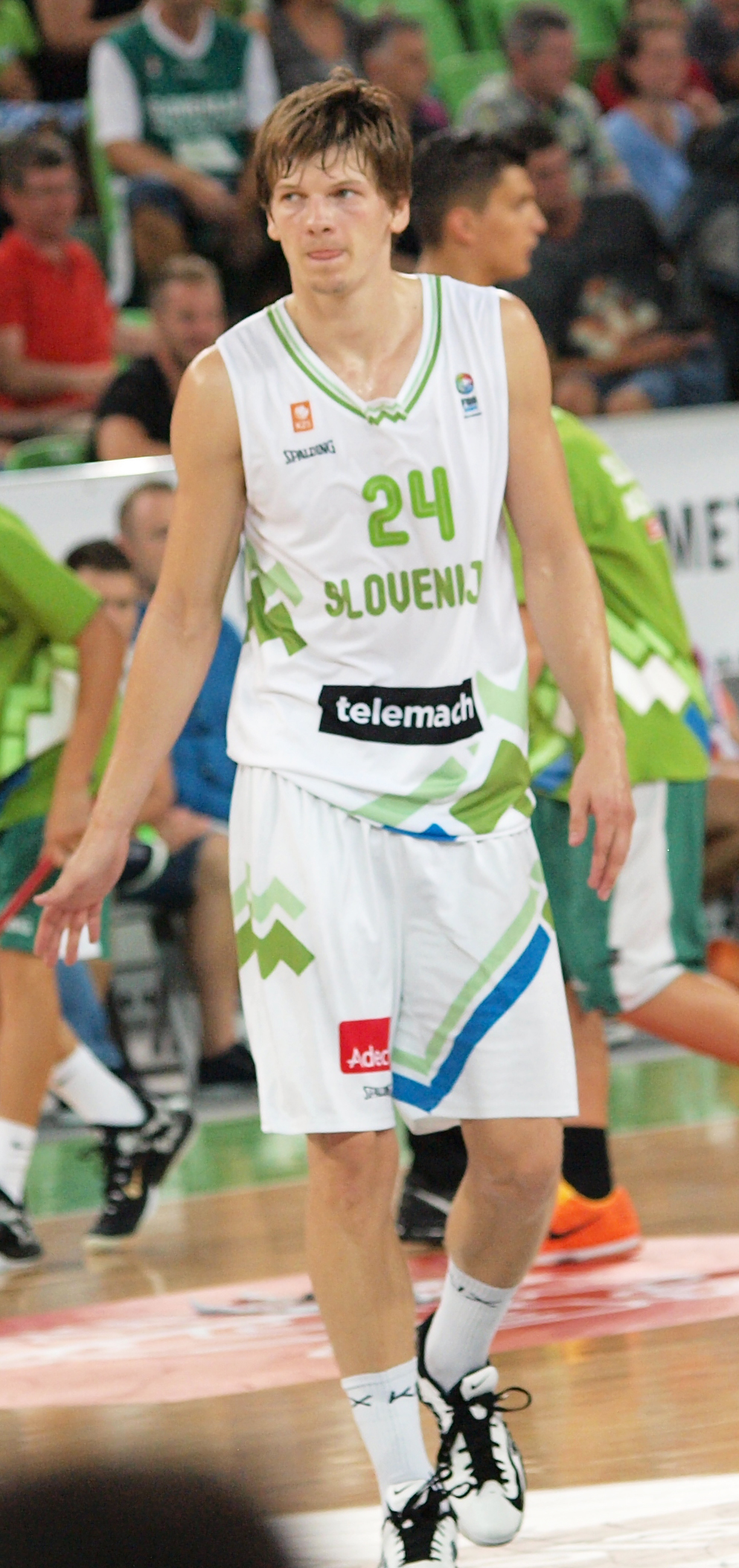
- Klobučar in 2015

Stjarnan
- Position: Guard / small forward
- League: Úrvalsdeild karla

Personal information
- Born: 19 August 1987 (age 39) Novo Mesto, SR Slovenia, SFR Yugoslavia
- Listed height: 6 ft 6 in (1.98 m)
- Listed weight: 200 lb (91 kg)

Career information
- Playing career: 2003–present

Career history
- 2003–2005: Krka
- 2005–2008: Geoplin Slovan
- 2008–2010: Union Olimpija
- 2010–2011: Partizan Belgrade
- 2011: Union Olimpija
- 2011: Krka
- 2011–2012: Ostuni Basket
- 2012–2014: Krka
- 2014–2015: ratiopharm ulm
- 2015–2018: İstanbul BB
- 2018–2019: Galatasaray
- 2019–2021: Élan Chalon
- 2021: Büyükçekmece
- 2021: Aris Thessaloniki
- 2021–2023: Kecskemét
- 2023–2024: Cedevita Olimpija
- 2025: Geoplin Slovan
- 2025: Stjarnan
- 2025-: Šenčur

Career highlights
- 4× Slovenian League champion (2009, 2013, 2014, 2024); 4× Slovenian Cup winner (2009, 2010, 2014, 2024); Serbian Cup winner (2011); Slovenian League Finals MVP (2014); Turkish League All-Star (2017)
Medals
Men's basketball
Representing Slovenia
European U-20 Championship
Bronze medal – third place	2006 Turkey	Team competition

Jaka Klobučar (born August 19, 1987) is a Slovenian professional basketball player who was a member of the Slovenian national basketball team from 2007 to 2017. Standing at 1.98 m (6 ft 6 in), he plays the point guard, shooting guard and small forward positions. During his career, he has won the Slovenian League championship four times and was named the Finals MVP in 2024.

== Professional career ==
Klobučar has played with Krka Novo Mesto, Geoplin Slovan, Partizan Belgrade, Union Olimpija, Ostuni Basket and ratiopharm ulm.

On 4 September 2015 he signed for İstanbul BB, where he spent three seasons. On 7 August 2018 he signed with Galatasaray of the Turkish Basketbol Süper Ligi (BSL).

On 3 November 2019 he signed with Élan Chalon of the French LNB Pro A.

On 20 January 2021 he moved back to Turkey for Büyükçekmece Basketbol.

On 9 November 2021 Klobučar signed with Aris of the Greek Basket League, temporarily replacing the injured Olivier Hanlan on the team's roster. On December 10 of the same year, he officially parted ways with the Greek club, having appeared in two league matches and averaging 7.5 points and 3 assists per contest.

During the 2023–2024 season, Klobučar played for Cedevita Olimpija in the Slovenian League and helped the team win the national championship, the Slovenian Cup and the Super Cup.

In January 2025, Klobučar with Geoplin Slovan. Later that month, he left the team and signed with Stjarnan of the Icelandic Úrvalsdeild karla.

== National team career ==
Klobučar competed for the senior Slovenian national basketball team at the 2007 FIBA European Championship, Olympic Qualifying Tournament 2008, 2009 FIBA European Championship, and 2010 FIBA World Championship.

He represented Slovenia at the 2015 EuroBasket where they were eliminated by Latvia in eighth finals.

== Career statistics ==
Legend
GP	Games played	GS	Games started	MPG	Minutes per game
FG%	Field-goal percentage	3P%	3-point field-goal percentage	FT%	Free-throw percentage
RPG	Rebounds per game	APG	Assists per game	SPG	Steals per game
BPG	Blocks per game	PPG	Points per game	PIR	Performance index rating
**Bold**	Career high

=== EuroLeague ===
Year	Team	GP	GS	MPG	FG%	3P%	FT%	RPG	APG	SPG	BPG	PPG	PIR
2008–09	Union Olimpija	9	**4**	**16.1**	.237	.125	**.667**	**2.2**	**.9**	.4	—	**3.8**	**1.8**
2009–10	Union Olimpija	9	**4**	11.1	**.350**	**.417**	.333	.9	.6	**.8**	—	2.3	.6
2010–11	Partizan	**16**	2	10.6	.313	.194	.625	.8	.7	.4	—	2.9	.6
Career		34	10	12.2	.292	.220	.605	1.2	.7	.5	—	3.0	.9
