= Andrej Žakelj =

Slovenian basketball coach and former player

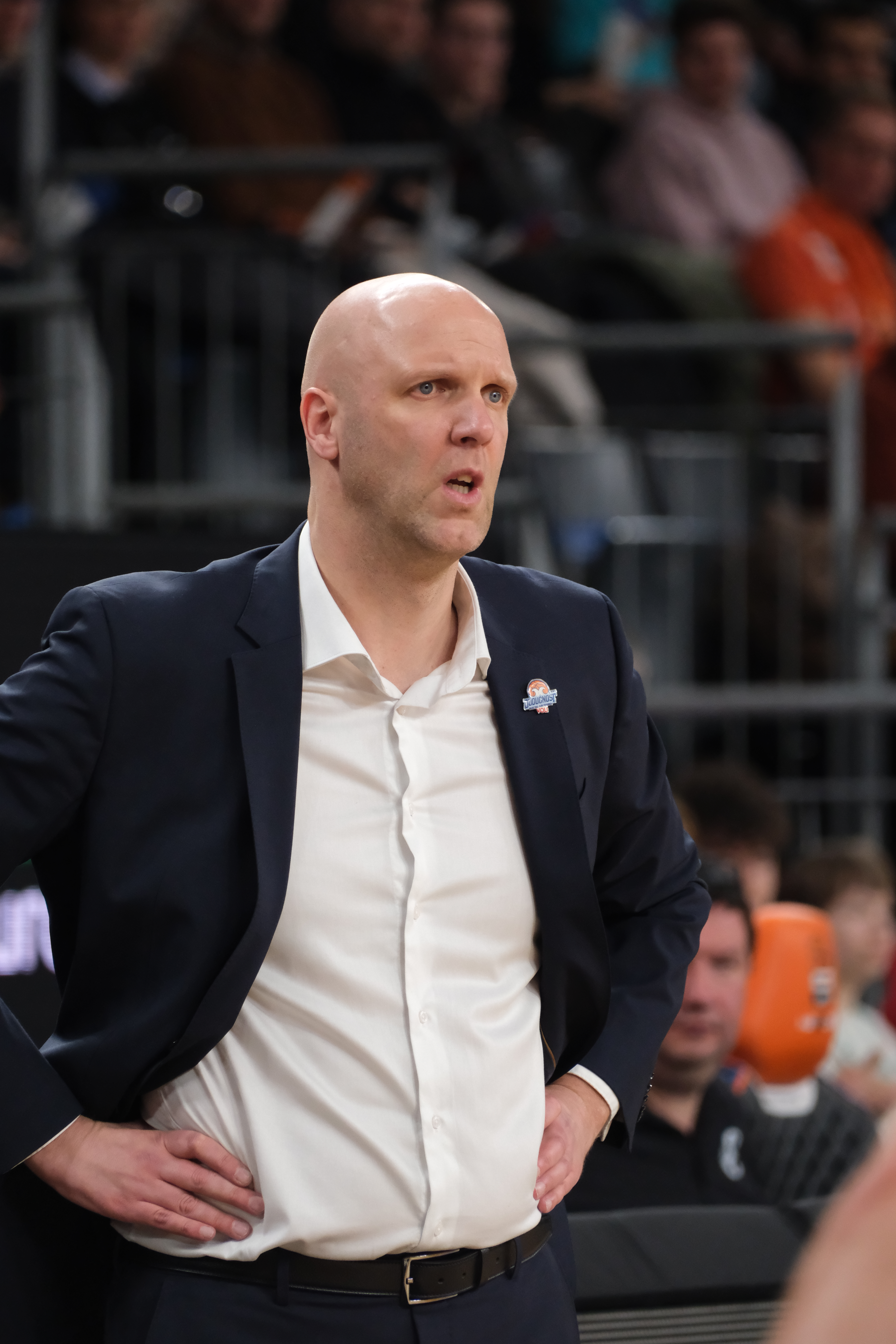
- Žakelj with Budućnost in 2025

Budućnost VOLI
- Position: Head coach
- League: ABA League; Montenegrin League

Personal information
- Born: 17 November 1978 (age 47) Postojna, SR Slovenia, SFR Yugoslavia
- Listed height: 1.94 m (6 ft 4 in)

Career information
- Playing career: 1995–2006
- Coaching career: 2006–present

Career history

Coaching
- 2006–2010: Geoplin Slovan (assistant)
- 2010–2015: Union Olimpija (assistant)
- 2015: Hopsi Polzela (assistant)
- 2015–2016: Lastovka
- 2016: TBV Start Lublin
- 2016–2017: Terme Olimia Podčetrtek
- 2017: Šentjur
- 2019: Koper Primorska (assistant)
- 2019–2020: Koper Primorska
- 2021–2023: SC Derby
- 2023–present: Budućnost
- 2025–present: Montenegro

Career highlights
- As coach: Slovenian Cup winner (2020); ABA League Supercup winner (2023)

Andrej Žakelj (born 17 November 1978) is a Slovenian professional basketball coach and former player who is the current head coach for Budućnost VOLI of the Adriatic League and the Prva A Liga.

== Playing career ==
During his playing days, Žakelj played for Postojna (1995–1999, 2004–2005), Geoplin Slovan (1999–2003), Kraški Zidar (2003–2004), and Nova Gorica (2005–2006). He retired as a player with Nova Gorica in 2006.

== Coaching career ==
After retirement in 2006, Žakelj joined the coaching staff of Geoplin Slovan as an assistant coach. Afterward, he was assistant coach for Union Olimpija from 2010 to 2015. In summer 2015, Žakelj joined Hopsi Polzela as assistant coach. On 22 December 2015, he was named the head coach for Lastovka. After the 2015–16 Slovenian League season, Lastovka merged into Primorska.

In summer 2016, Žakelj became the head coach for TBV Start Lublin of the Polish League. He left Start Lublin on 23 November 2016. On 29 December, Žakelj was named as the head coach for Terme Olimia Podčetrtek for the rest of the 2016–17 season.

On 26 May 2017, Žakelj became the head coach for Šentjur. He parted ways with Šentjur on 26 December.

On 22 December 2019, Žakelj was named the head coach for Koper Primorska, replacing Jurica Golemac. Koper Primorska was folded in December 2020.

On 8 July 2021, Studentski centar (later SC Derby) hired Žakelj as their new head coach.

On 18 November 2023, Budućnost VOLI hired Žakelj as their new head coach.
