= Vasl =

Vasl or VASL may refer to:

- Vasl (television series), 2010 Pakistani drama serial
- Miha Vašl (born 1992), Slovenian basketball player
- Virtual Advanced Squad Leader, computerized interface for playing board game Advanced Squad Leader
- Solapur Airport, ICAO code VASL, airport in Solapur, Maharashtra, India
