= Željko Zagorac =

Slovenian basketball player

Personal information
- Born: March 9, 1981 (age 45) Gospić, SR Croatia SFR Yugoslavia
- Listed height: 6 ft 8.5 in (2.04 m)
- Listed weight: 235 lb (107 kg)

Career information
- Playing career: 1998–present
- Position: Power forward / center

Career history
- 1998–1999: Union Olimpija II
- 1999–2000: Triglav Kranj
- 2000–2001: Union Olimpija
- 2001–2002: Geoplin Slovan
- 2002–2003: Union Olimpija
- 2003–2005: TXU Energie Braunschweig
- 2005–2006: Helios Domžale
- 2006–2007: Ural Great
- 2007–2008: WTK Anwil Włocławek
- 2008–2010: Helios Domžale
- 2011: Prostějov
- 2011: Aliağa Petkim
- 2012: Union Olimpija
- 2012: Slovan
- 2013–2014: Falco KC Szombathely
- 2014–2015: Grosbasket
- 2015–2016: Helios Domžale
- 2016: LTH Castings
- 2017–2018: Parklji
- 2018: ECE Triglav
- 2018–2019: Portorož
- 2019: Ježica

Career highlights
- 2× Slovenian League champion (2001, 2016); 3x Slovenian Cup winner (2001, 2003, 2012); Alpe Adria Cup winner (2016)

Želimir Zagorac (born March 9, 1981, in Gospić, SR Croatia, Yugoslavia) is a professional basketball player. He is 204 cm tall and currently plays for KK Ježica.

Zagorac competed for Slovenia at the 2006 FIBA World Championship; he has a younger brother, Saša, who is also a basketball player.
