= Triglav Kranj =

Triglav Kranj may refer to several sports clubs in Kranj, Slovenia:

- HK Triglav Kranj, ice hockey
- KK Triglav Kranj, basketball
- NK Triglav Kranj, association football
