= Jan Barbarič =

Slovenian basketball player

Free agent
- Position: Point guard / shooting guard

Personal information
- Born: September 30, 1995 (age 30) Koper, Slovenia
- Listed height: 1.88 m (6 ft 2 in)

Career information
- NBA draft: 2017: undrafted
- Playing career: 2011–present

Career history
- 2011–2016: Portorož
- 2013–2014: →UKK Koper
- 2016–2019: Olimpija

Career highlights
- Slovenian League MVP (2016); 2× Slovenian League champion (2017, 2018); Slovenian Cup winner (2017)

Jan Barbarič (born September 30, 1995) is a Slovenian professional basketball player who most recently played for KK Olimpija of the Slovenian League. He is a 1.88 m tall combo guard.

== Professional career ==
Barbarič started playing professional basketball for Portorož.

On August 25, 2016, Barbarič signed a two-year contract with Union Olimpija.
