= Simo Atanacković =

Slovenian-Bosnian basketball player

Terme Olimia Podčetrtek
- Position: Forward
- League: Slovenian League

Personal information
- Born: March 11, 1990 (age 36) Loznica
- Listed height: 2.07 m (6 ft 9 in)
- Listed weight: 98 kg (216 lb)

Career information
- Playing career: 2008–present

Career history
- 2008–2012: Zlatorog Laško
- 2012–2013: Elektra Šoštanj
- 2013: Czarni Słupsk
- 2013–2014: Elektra Šoštanj
- 2014–2015: Hopsi Polzela
- 2015–2017: Helios Suns
- 2017–2018: Sorgues Basket Club
- 2018-2020: Hopsi Polzela
- 2020-present: Terme Olimia Podčetrtek

Career highlights
- Slovenian League (2016); Alpe Adria Cup (2016)

Simo Atanacković (born March 11, 1990, in Loznica ) is a Slovenian-Bosnian professional basketball player for Terme Olimia Podčetrtek of the Slovenian League. He is a 2.07 m tall Forward.
