= Žiga Dimec =

Slovenian basketball player

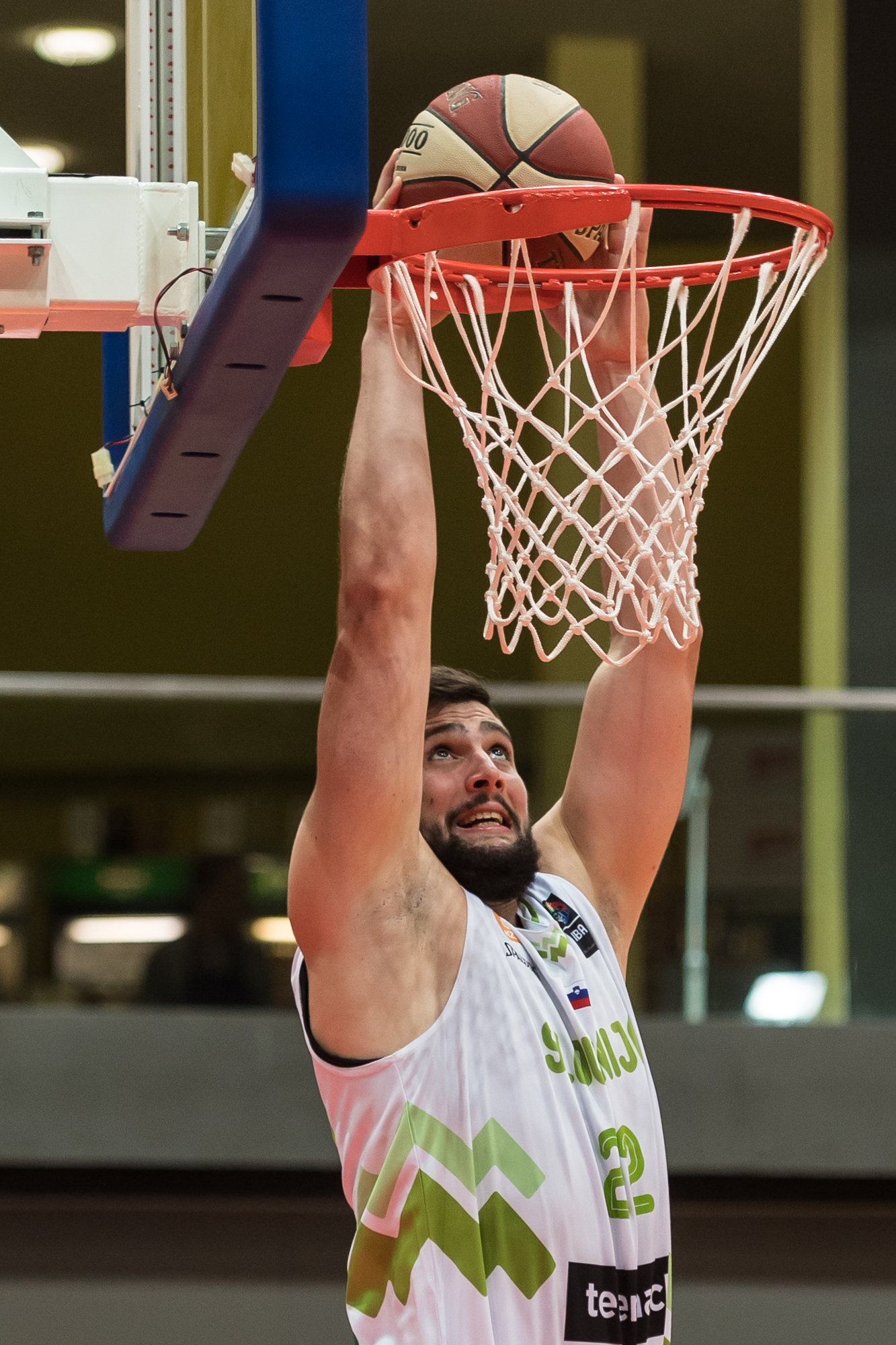
- Dimec with Slovenia in 2016

No. 33 – Ajdovščina
- Position: Center
- League: 2. SKL

Personal information
- Born: 20 February 1993 (age 33) Celje, Slovenia
- Listed height: 2.11 m (6 ft 11 in)
- Listed weight: 113 kg (249 lb)

Career information
- NBA draft: 2015: undrafted
- Playing career: 2010–present

Career history
- 2010–2014: Zlatorog Laško
- 2010–2011: →Konjice
- 2014–2015: Rogaška
- 2015–2018: Krka
- 2018: Bayreuth
- 2018–2019: Lietkabelis
- 2019–2020: Sixt Primorska
- 2020–2021: Cedevita Olimpija
- 2021–2022: Anwil Włocławek
- 2022–2023: Nishinomiya Storks
- 2023–2024: Mersin Büyükşehir Belediyesi
- 2024: Anwil Włocławek
- 2024–2025: TSG GhostHawks
- 2025: Borac Čačak
- 2025–present: Ajdovščina

Career highlights
- Slovenian League champion (2021); 2× Slovenian Cup winner (2016, 2020); 2× Slovenian Supercup winner (2016, 2020); 3. SKL champion (2026)
Medals
Men's basketball
Representing Slovenia
EuroBasket
Gold medal – first place	2017 Finland–Israel–Romania–Turkey

Žiga Dimec (born 20 February 1993) is a Slovenian professional basketball player for Ajdovščina of the Slovenian Second League (2. SKL). He also represents the Slovenian national basketball team.

== Professional career ==
Dimec played in youth categories with Zlatorog Laško. For the 2010–11 season he was loaned to Konjice of the Slovenian Second League. From 2011 to 2014 he played with Zlatorog Laško. For the 2014–15 season he moved to Rogaška. In July 2015, he signed with Krka.

On 3 September 2018 Dimec signed a three-month deal with Medi Bayreuth.

On 27 November 2018 Dimec signed with Lithuanian team BC Lietkabelis.

On 1 December 2021 he signed with Anwil Włocławek of the PLK.

On 30 August 2022 he signed with Nishinomiya Storks of the B.League.

On 13 September 2023 he signed with Mersin Büyükşehir Belediyesi of the Türkiye Basketbol Ligi.

In the middle of the 2023/2024 season, after terminating the contract with the Turkish club, he joined KK Włocławek of the Polish Basketball League on January 4, 2024.

On August 17, 2024, he signed with TSG GhostHawks of the P. League+.

On 6 September 2025, he signed with Borac Čačak of the Basketball League of Serbia (KLS) and the ABA League. In November, he parted ways with the team.

On 9 December 2025, he signed with Ajdovščina of the Slovenian Third League (3. SKL). In May 2026, they won the 3. SKL and got promoted to the Second League.

== National team career ==
With Slovenia's junior national teams, Dimec played at the 2010 FIBA Europe Under-18 Championship, 2011 FIBA Europe Under-18 Championship, 2012 FIBA Europe Under-20 Championship and 2013 FIBA Europe Under-20 Championship.

Dimec became a member of the senior Slovenian national basketball team in 2016. He played at the EuroBasket 2017.
