= KK Žoltasti Troti =

Slovenian basketball club

- League: Slovenian Third League
- Founded: 2010; 15 years ago
- Arena: Livada Sports Centre
- Capacity: 300
- Location: Novo Mesto, Slovenia
- Team colors: Yellow, green, black
- Head coach: Luka Mittag
- Website: troti.si
Home	Away

Košarkarski klub Žoltasti Troti (English: Basketball Club Žoltasti Troti) or simply KK Žoltasti Troti is a basketball team based in Novo Mesto, Slovenia, that competes in the Slovenian Third League, the third level of Slovenian basketball. The team's home arena is Livada Sports Centre.

== Season-by-season records ==
Season	Tier	League	Pos.	Postseason	Cup
2015–16	4	4. SKL	6	—	—
2016–17	4	4. SKL	1	Promoted	—
2017–18	3	3. SKL	1	Promoted	Second round
2018–19	2	2. SKL	10	—	Fourth round
2019–20	2	2. SKL	3	—	Third round
2020–21	2	2. SKL	3	Semifinals	—
2021–22	2	2. SKL	2	Finals	Fourth round

== Honours ==
- Slovenian Second Division

Runners-up: 2021–22

- Slovenian Third Division

Winners: 2017–18

- Slovenian Fourth Division

Winners: 2016–17
