= 2. SKL =

Basketball league in Slovenia

- Sport: Basketball
- Founded: 1994
- First season: 1994–95
- No. of teams: 12
- Country: Slovenia
- Continent: Europe
- Most recent champion: Gorica (1st title) (2025–26)
- Most titles: LTH Castings (4 titles)
- Level on pyramid: 2
- Promotion to: 1. SKL
- Relegation to: 3. SKL
- Website: kzs.si (in Slovene)

The Slovenian Second Basketball League (Slovene: 2. slovenska košarkarska liga), abbreviated as the 2. SKL, is the second-highest basketball league in Slovenia.

== Format ==
Each team plays 22 matches (11 home and 11 away). Teams play two matches against each other, once at home and once at their opponent's arena.

- The top eight teams qualify for the playoffs
- The bottom four teams qualify for the relegation round
- The winner of the playoffs is promoted to the 1. SKL
- The two worst teams of the relegation round are relegated to the 3. SKL.

== Current teams ==
As of the 2026–27 season

- Branik Maribor
- Celje
- Grosuplje
- Hidria
- Ipros Vrhnika
- Ježica
- Konjice
- Leone Ajdovščina
- LTH Castings
- Portorož
- Slovan
- Terme Olimia Podčetrtek

== List of winners ==
Season	Champions
1994–95	Krško
1995–96	Sežana
1996–97	Škofja Loka
1997–98	Triglav Kranj
1998–99	Zagorje
1999–2000	Šentjur
2000–01	Koper
2001–02	Jurij Plava Laguna
2002–03	Unika Postojna
2003–04	Branik Maribor
2004–05	Loka Kava
2005–06	Triglav Kranj
2006–07	Hopsi Polzela
2007–08	Misel Postojnska Jama
2008–09	Parklji Ljubljana
2009–10	Maribor Messer
2010–11	Rogaška
2011–12	Grosuplje
2012–13	Splošna plovba Portorož
2013–14	Šenčur GGD
2014–15	LTH Castings
2015–16	Terme Olimia Podčetrtek
2016–17	Ilirija
2017–18	Terme Olimia Podčetrtek
2018–19	Terme Olimia Podčetrtek
2019–20	N/A (Note: Winners were not declared as the season was not completed due to the COVID-19 pandemic. ECE Triglav Kranj, the highest-placed team, was promoted to the top division.)
2020–21	Nutrisport Ilirija
2021–22	LTH Castings
2022–23	ECE Triglav Kranj
2023–24	Zlatorog Laško
2024–25	Hopsi Polzela
2025–26	Gorica

== Statistical leaders ==
Season	Top rating	PIR	Top scorer	PPG	Top rebounder	RPG	Top assistant	APG
2007–08	(Slovenia) Tadej Tušek	23.62	(Slovenia) Uroš Ivanovič	20.78	(Slovenia) Tadej Tušek	11.54	(Slovenia) Mitja Brečko	5.75
2008–09	(Slovenia) Roman Horvat	20.96	(Slovenia) Roman Horvat	21.20	(Slovenia) Dušan Dolinar	9.00	(Slovenia) Luka Gorenec	3.61
2009–10	(Slovenia) Boštjan Sivka	23.17	(Slovenia) Dalibor Petrović	19.32	(Slovenia) Dušan Dolinar	10.92	(Slovenia) Marko Marcetič	4.13
2010–11	(Slovenia) Štefan Kosec	20.27	(Slovenia) Dalibor Petrović	19.78	(Slovenia) Gregor Jakhel Kolarević	9.95	(Slovenia) Boban Tomić	5.92
2011–12	(Slovenia) Jure Eržen	22.74	(Slovenia) Igor Spešić	20.50	(Slovenia) Igor Spešić	9.67	(Slovenia) Rok Perko	5.74
2012–13	(Slovenia) Miha Markič	23.37	(Slovenia) Miha Markič	20.32	(Slovenia) Igor Spešić	10.08	(Slovenia) Rok Perko	5.27
2013–14	(Slovenia) Gregor Jakhel Kolarević	25.79	(Slovenia) Gregor Jakhel Kolarević	21.00	(Slovenia) Gregor Jakhel Kolarević	11.93	(Slovenia) Domen Janc	5.34
2014–15	(Slovenia) Anže Cerkovnik	22.14	(Slovenia) Blaž Mesiček	21.05	(Slovenia) Anže Cerkovnik	10.00	(Slovenia) Gašper Ovnik	4.91
2015–16	(Slovenia) Anže Cerkovnik	23.45	(Slovenia) Marko Cej	18.59	(Slovenia) Anže Cerkovnik	10.50	(Slovenia) Rene Žvan	5.52
2016–17	(Slovenia) Goran Jagodnik	23	(Slovenia) Željko Zagorac	19.08	(Slovenia) Milan Kovačević	11.53	(Slovenia) Žan Mark Šiško	7.09
2017–18	(Slovenia) Anže Cerkovnik	20.95	(Slovenia) Gašper Sevšek	18	(Slovenia) Jaka Stemberger	11.07	(Slovenia) Tadej Koštomaj	7.48
2018–19	(United States) Tim Cole	27.82	(Slovenia) Milan Kovačević	19,27	(United States) Tim Cole	12.68	(Slovenia) Tadej Koštomaj	7.43
