= Jurica Golemac =

Croatian basketball player and coach

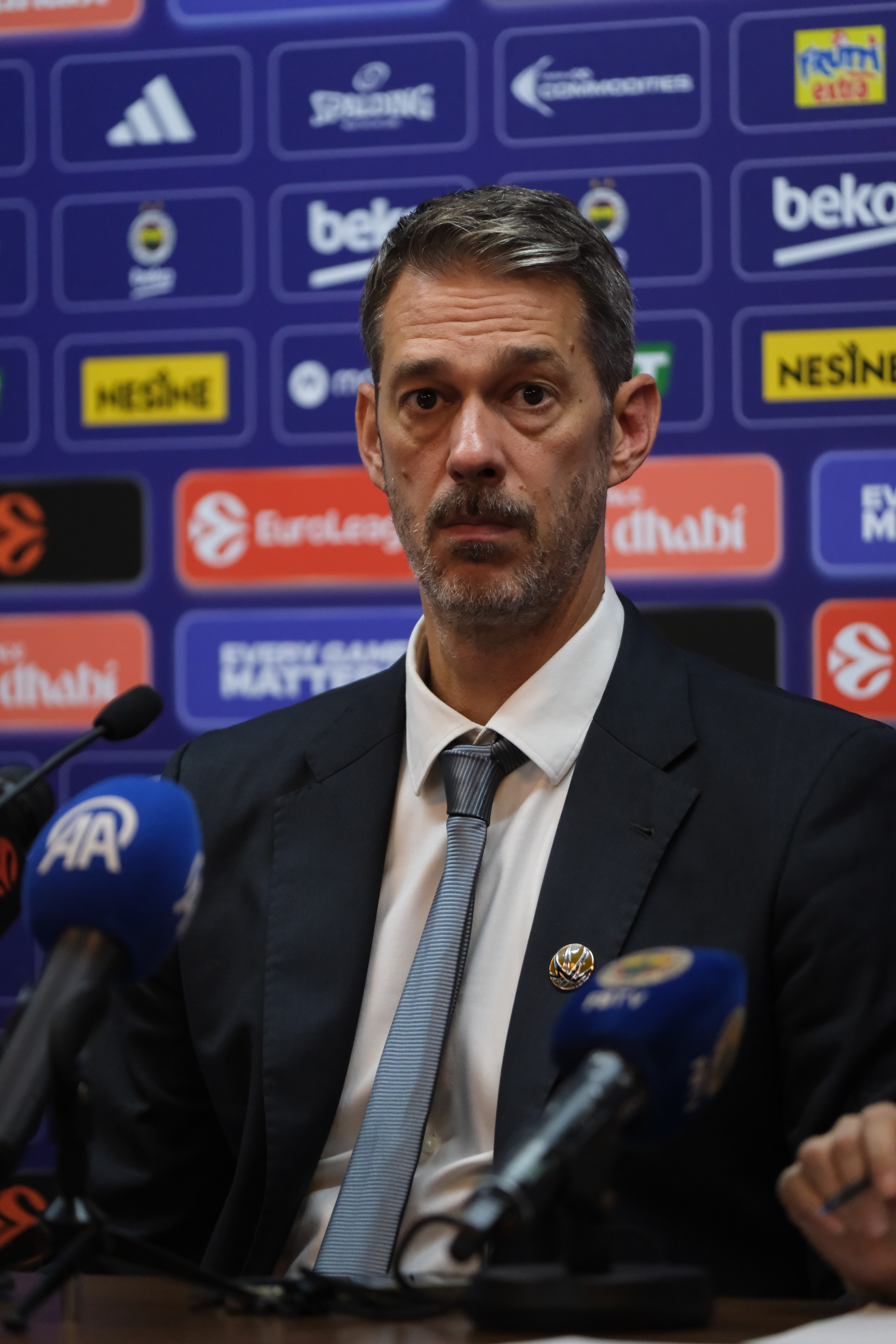
- Golemac in 2025

Personal information
- Born: 29 May 1977 (age 49) Zagreb, SR Croatia, Yugoslavia
- Listed height: 2.09 m (6 ft 10 in)

Career information
- NBA draft: 1999: undrafted
- Playing career: 1996–2013
- Position: Forward / center
- Coaching career: 2013–present

Career history

Playing
- 1995–1997: Zrinjevac
- 1997–1998: Union Olimpija (2nd team)
- 1998–1999: Geoplin Slovan
- 1999–2002: Union Olimpija
- 2002–2003: Efes Pilsen
- 2003–2004: Cibona
- 2004–2006: Ural Great
- 2006–2007: Hapoel Jerusalem
- 2007–2008: Paris-Levallois
- 2008–2009: Panellinios
- 2009: Virtus Roma
- 2009: Panathinaikos
- 2009–2010: Alba Berlin
- 2010: Zadar
- 2010–2011: Colossus Rhodes
- 2011–2012: Sidigas Avellino
- 2012–2013: Krka

Coaching
- 2013–2015: Cibona (assistant)
- 2016–2017: Tajfun Šentjur
- 2016–2017: Georgia (assistant)
- 2017–2019: Koper Primorska
- 2020–2023: Cedevita Olimpija
- 2024: Hapoel Eilat
- 2024–2026: Dubai Basketball

Career highlights
- As player: ABA League champion (2002); 2× Slovenian League champion (2001, 2002); Turkish League champion (2003); 3× Slovenian Cup winner (2000–2002); As head coach: ABA League Second Division champion (2019); 3× Slovenian League champion (2019, 2021, 2022); 4× Slovenian Cup winner (2018, 2019, 2022, 2023); 5× Slovenian Supercup winner (2018–2022)

Jurica Golemac (born 29 May 1977) is a Croatian professional basketball coach and former player who most recently served as head coach for Dubai Basketball of the ABA League and the EuroLeague. He played at both the forward and center positions.

== Professional career ==
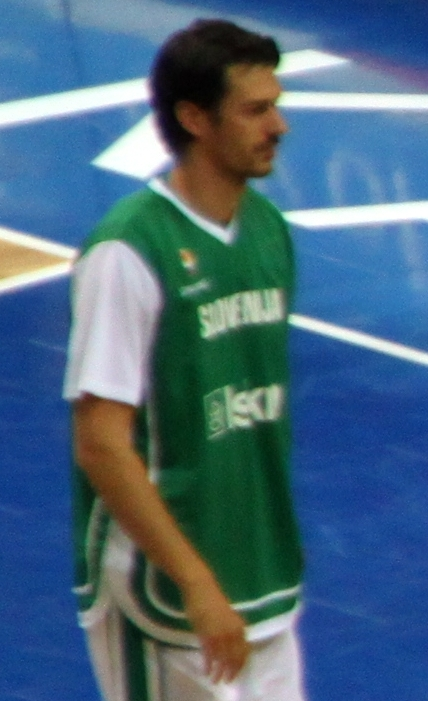
Golemac playing for Slovenia in 2009

In his professional career, Golemac played for Zrinjevac, Union Olimpija, Geoplin Slovan, Efes Pilsen, Cibona, Ural Great, Hapoel Jerusalem, Paris-Levallois, Panellinios, Virtus Roma, Panathinaikos, Zadar, Colossus Rhodes, Alba Berlin, Sidigas Avellino and Krka. He retired from professional basketball in January 2013 after knee injury.

Internationally, Golemac played for the Slovenia national team and represented the country at the 2003, 2005 and 2009 editions of EuroBasket.

== Coaching career ==
Golemac started his coaching career as an assistant coach to Slaven Rimac at Cibona, in November 2013. The surprising victory at the 2013–14 ABA League final four in Belgrade was followed by a string of bad results which resulted in Rimac and Golemac being sacked in December 2015.

In 2016, Golemac was appointed the assistant coach of the Georgia national team and the head coach of Tajfun Šentjur of the Slovenian League.

In May 2017, Golemac was named the head coach of Koper Primorska. In his inaugural season with the club, Primorska won first trophies in its history, including the Slovenian Cup and Supercup. In 2019, Primorska managed to win the ABA League Second Division, being consequently promoted to the First Division. Besides this success, the club also won the first domestic league title, and the second domestic cup in the history. On 20 December 2019, Golemac resigned from Koper Primorska.

On 27 January 2020, Golemac was appointed the head coach of the Slovenian club Cedevita Olimpija, following the departure of his former colleague Slaven Rimac. After a series of poor results Golemac was dismissed in March 2023.

In February 2024, Golemac was appointed as the head coach of Hapoel Eilat of the Israeli Basketball Premier League.

In June 2024, Golemac was appointed as the head coach of the newly-formed Dubai Basketball of the ABA League.

After the ABA League game in March 2026, Golemac asserted that fair play is not a driving force in his philosophy and made it clear that he does not want his players to display such gestures. Dubai parted ways with Golemac in April 2026.
