= Ousman Krubally =

American-Gambian basketball player

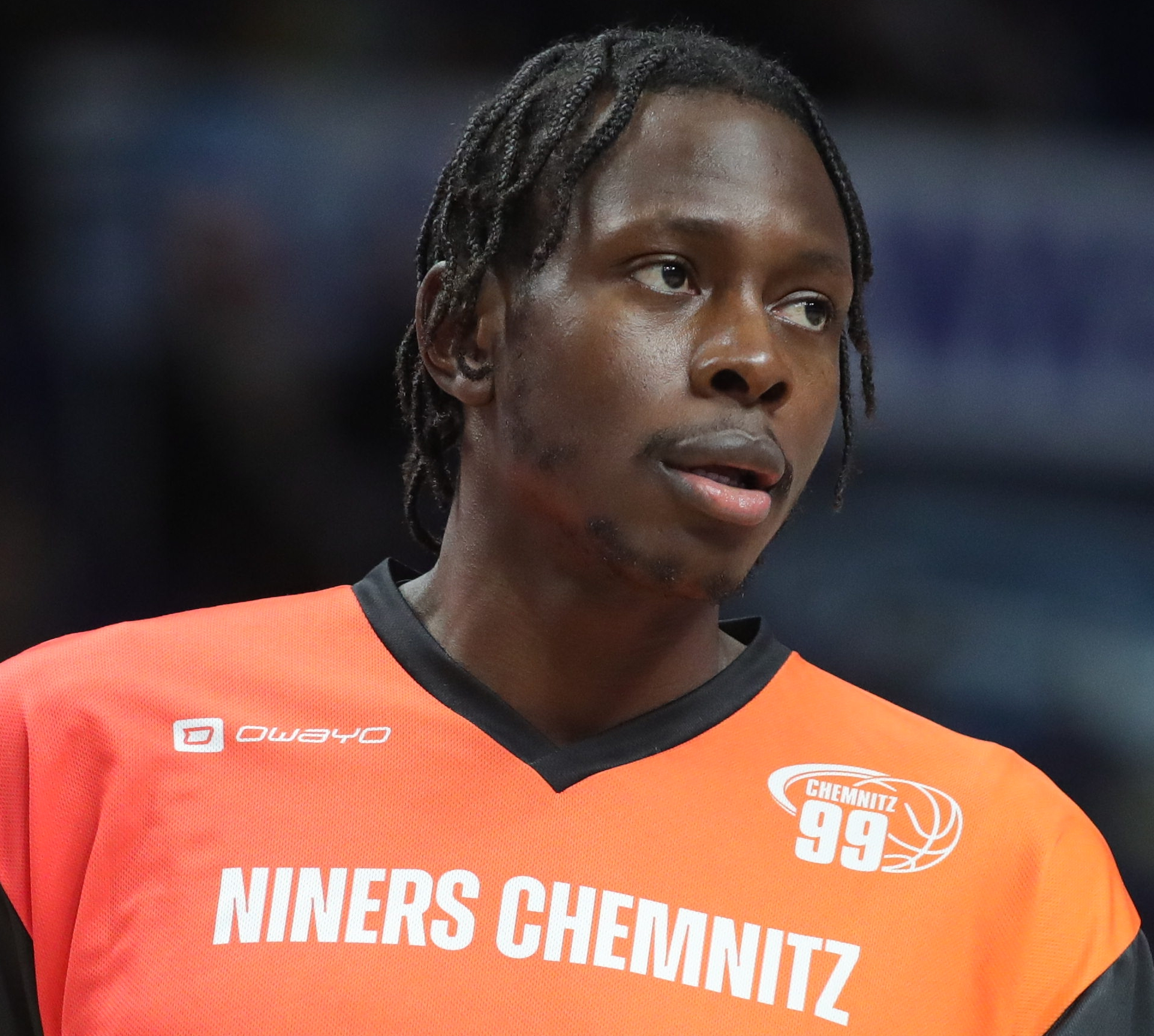
- Krubally with Niners Chemnitz in 2023

No. 5 – Saint-Quentin Basket-Ball
- Position: Power forward / center
- League: LNB Élite

Personal information
- Born: March 13, 1988 (age 38) Atlanta, Georgia, U.S.
- Listed height: 2.02 m (6 ft 8 in)
- Listed weight: 102 kg (225 lb)

Career information
- High school: W. D. Mohammed (Atlanta, Georgia)
- College: Georgia State (2006–2010)
- NBA draft: 2010: undrafted
- Playing career: 2010–present

Career history
- 2010–2012: London Leopards
- 2012–2013: Den Helder Kings
- 2013–2014: Grosuplje
- 2014–2015: Legnano Knights
- 2015–2016: Lavrio
- 2016: Reyer Venezia
- 2016–2017: Astana
- 2017–2018: PAOK Thessaloniki
- 2018–2019: Pistoia Basket 2000
- 2019–2020: ESSM Le Portel
- 2020–2021: New Basket Brindisi
- 2021–2022: Larisa
- 2022–2023: Keravnos
- 2023: Bnei Herzliya
- 2023–2024: Niners Chemnitz
- 2024–2026: Boulazac Basket Dordogne
- 2026–present: Saint-Quentin

Career highlights
- FIBA Europe Cup champion (2024); FIBA Europe Cup rebounding leader (2023); LNB Pro B champion (2025); Greek League rebounding leader (2022); All-Greek League Second Team (2022); Slovenian League MVP (2014); Slovenian League Top Scorer (2014); Slovenian League rebounding leader (2014); Kazakhstan League champion (2017); Kazakhstan Cup winner (2017); Italian 2nd Division Silver MVP (2015); Cypriot League All-Star (2022)

Ousman Krubally (born March 13, 1988) is an American-Gambian professional basketball player for Saint-Quentin of the LNB Élite. He is a 2.02 m (6 ft 7 1/2 in) tall power forward and small ball center. After playing four years of college basketball at Georgia State, Krubally entered the 2010 NBA draft, but he was not selected in the draft's two rounds.

== High school ==
Krubally attended and played high school basketball at W. D. Mohammed High School, in Atlanta, Georgia.

== College career ==
Krubally burst onto the scene at Georgia State, where he played college basketball under head coach, Michael Perry. He stayed at Georgia State until 2010, mostly playing as a bench player.

== Professional career ==
After not being drafted in the 2010 NBA draft, Krubally signed with the London Leopards of the English Basketball League. Krubally finished the season averaging 22.1 points per game, the second highest in the Division. On July 15, 2011, he re-signed with the Leopards.

On November 21, 2012, he moved to Den Helder Kings of the Dutch League.

He next played with Grosuplje of the Slovenian Basketball League. Krubally had a terrific season, being the MVP of the league. He was also the league's top scorer and the top rebounder.

On July 27, 2014, he moved to Legnano Knights of the Italian 2nd Division Silver. He was the MVP of the regular season, averaging 19.2 points and 12 rebounds per game.

He joined the Greek League club Lavrio, in 2015. On May 2, 2016, Krubally moved to Umana Reyer Venezia of the Italian League for the rest of the season.

On July 25, 2016, Krubally joined the Kazakh VTB United League club Astana. He moved to the Greek club PAOK in 2017.

On August 8, 2018, Krubally signed a deal with the Italian LBA club Pistoia Basket 2000.

On July 17, 2019, he signed with ESSM Le Portel of the French LNB Pro A.

On July 22, 2020, he signed with New Basket Brindisi in the Italian Lega Basket Serie A and the Basketball Champions League. Krubally averaged 5.6 points and 4.5 rebounds per game.

On August 14, 2021, he signed with Larisa of the Greek Basket League. In 35 league games, he averaged 10.4 points, 9 rebounds, 1.7 assists and 1.1 steals, playing around 29 minutes per contest.

On September 26, 2023, he signed with Bnei Herzliya of the Israeli Basketball Premier League for two months.

On November 3, 2023, he signed with Niners Chemnitz of the Basketball Bundesliga (BBL).

On July 17, 2024, he signed with Boulazac Basket Dordogne of the LNB Pro B. On May 19, 2025, after winning the championship with the team, his contract was extended for one more year.

On September 11, 2026, he signed with Saint-Quentin Basket-Ball of the French LNB Élite.

== Personal life ==
Krubally is engaged to Dutch basketball player Demelza ten Caat. They have two sons, Zayn and Omari.

== Honours ==
Individual honors

- Slovenian League MVP: (2014)
- Slovenian League scoring leader: (2014)
- Slovenian League efficiency leader: (2014)
- Slovenian League rebounding leader: (2014)
- Italian 2nd Division Silver MVP: (2015)
