= Smiljan Pavič =

Slovenian basketball player

Personal information
- Born: February 5, 1980 (age 46) Slovenj Gradec, SR Slovenia, Yugoslavia
- Listed height: 6 ft 10 3/4 in (2.10 m)
- Listed weight: 250 lb (113 kg)

Career information
- NBA draft: 2002: undrafted
- Playing career: 1996–2022
- Position: Center
- Number: 15

Career history
- 1996–1999: KK Lumac Maribor
- 1999–2001: Geoplin Slovan
- 2001–2003: Pivovarna Laško
- 2003–2005: Union Olimpija
- 2005–2006: NIS Vojvodina
- 2006–2007: Helios Domžale
- 2007: Bandırma Banvit
- 2007–2008: AEK Athens
- 2008: ASK Riga
- 2008–2009: Krka
- 2009: Geoplin Slovan
- 2009–2014: Krka
- 2014–2020: Šenčur GDD
- 2020–2022: KK Žoltasti Troti

Career highlights
- 8× Slovenian League champion (2004, 2005, 2007, 2010–2014); 3× Slovenian Cup winner (2005, 2007, 2014); EuroChallenge champion (2011); Slovenian League Finals MVP (2010)
Medals
Representing Slovenia
FIBA Europe U-20 Championship
Gold medal – first place	2000 Macedonia	National Team

Smiljan Pavič (born February 5, 1980, in Slovenj Gradec, SR Slovenia, SFR Yugoslavia) is a Slovenian former professional basketball player.
