= Union Brewery (Slovenia) =

Brewery in Ljubljana, Slovenia

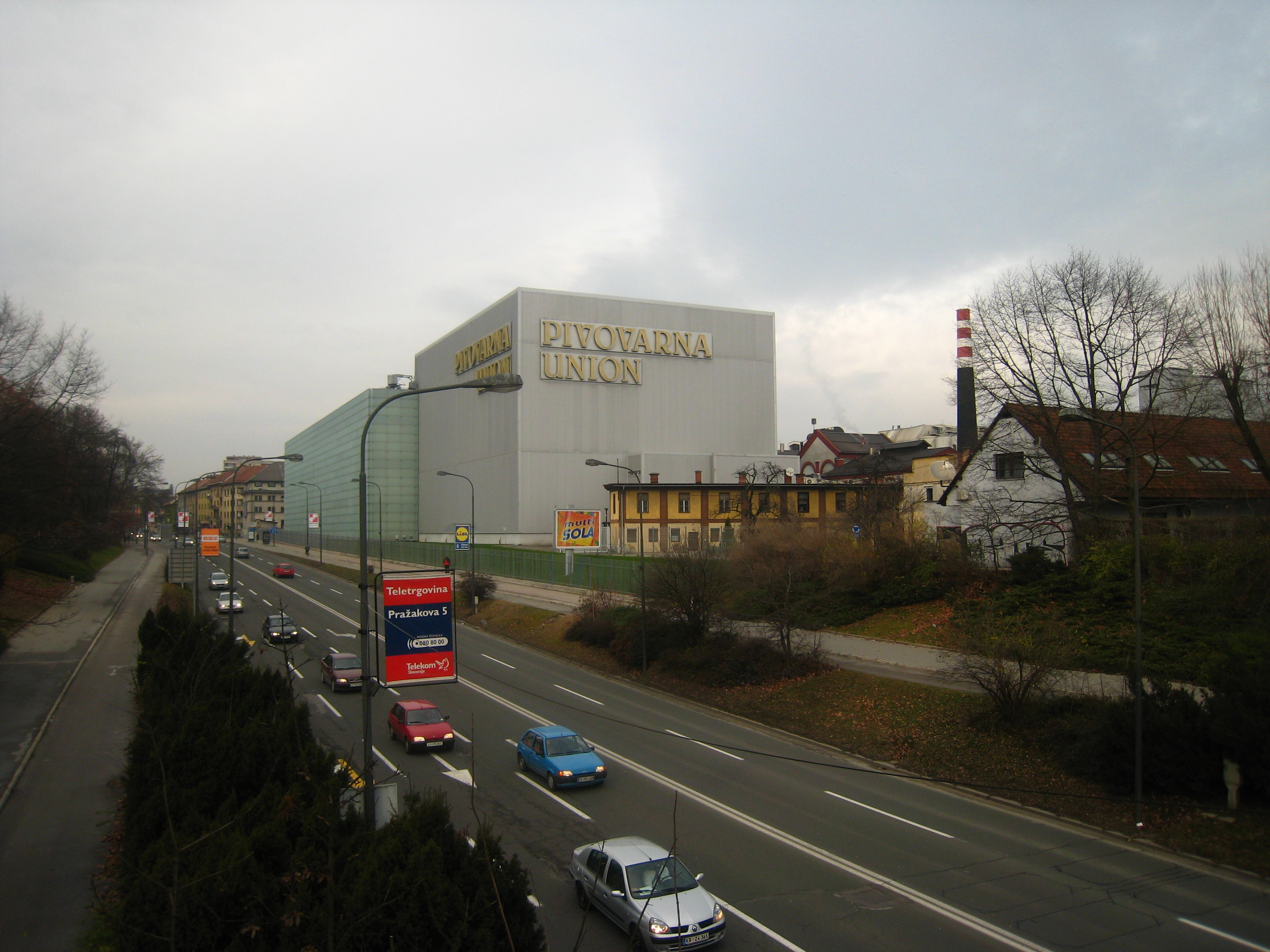
The modern brewery in Celovška cesta in Ljubljana

Union Brewery (Slovene: Pivovarna Union) is one of the largest breweries in Slovenia. It was formed in 1864 in Ljubljana and became part of Heineken International in 2015. Since 1987 it also includes a museum of beer.

== History ==
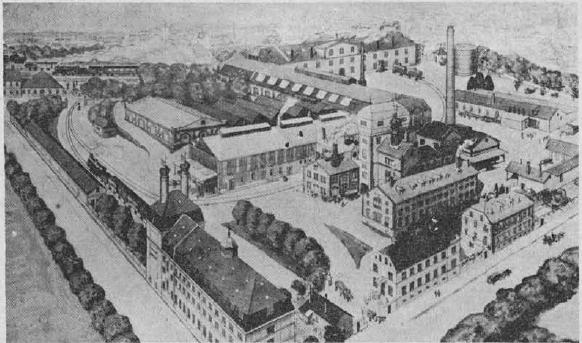
Historic image of the Union Brewery

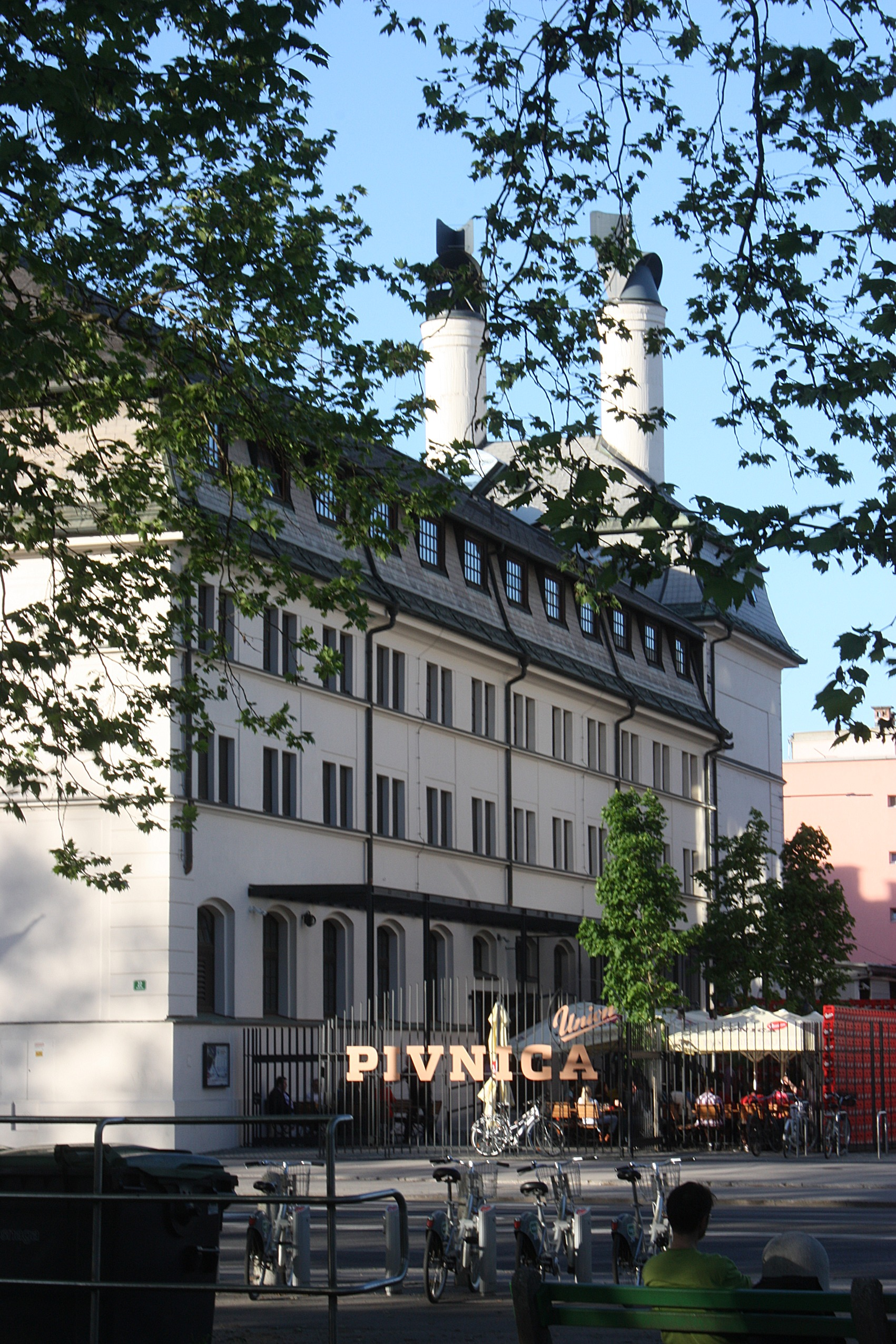
The old malt house of Union in Ljubljana is now the café Pivnica Union

The first record of beer brewing in Ljubljana is from 1592. The brewery was founded in 1864 as a small family business by Ivan and Peter Kosler as Kosler brewery. The actual birth of the Union brand dates back to 1909 when Kosler brothers, due to the increase in sales and the great market potential of the then Austro-Hungarian empire, founded the Pivovarna Union joint venture with the contribution of Credit and Trade Institute in Vienna. This joint stock company consisted of the union of the breweries of the Kosler brothers with the Reininghaus AG and Puntigam brewery in Graz.

Between 1910 and 1926, Pivovarna Union acquired several small Slovenian brewery factories. In 1910, it acquired the Auer and Perless brewery in Ljubljana, in 1911 the "Perless" brewery in Kočevje, in 1912 the Smidt brewery in Škofja Loka, in 1916 the Mayr brewery in Kranj and Zimmerman brewery in Lesce, in 1917 the brewery of Mengeš, In 1918 the Frählich brewery in Vrhnika, in 1924 the Pivovarna Laško and finally, in 1926, Thomas Gatz brewery in Maribor. All brewed mills stopped making beer independently, so the Pivovarna Union remained the only brewery in the Drava Banovina. Later, certain brands, like Pivovarna Lako, gained commercial independence. The Pivovarna Union made more than 100,000 hectoliters of beer in 1925.

Despite the difficulties caused by the outbreak of World War II, in 1945 the factory produced 45,000 hectoliters of beer. In 1946, when Slovenia was an integral part of the Socialist Federal Republic of Yugoslavia, the brewery was nationalized. In 1963, beer production rose to more than 220,000 hectoliters and today is around one million.

In 2005 the Laško Brewery acquired the majority of Union Brewery shares and subsequently became part of Heineken International in 2015 after Heineken acquired a majority stake of Laško Brewery.

In 2016 Laško and Union were formally merged into Pivovarna Laško Union under the owner, Heineken.

In October 2021, the company announced that they will move beer brewing to Laško by January or February 2022 at the latest, as the cooling system is no longer suitable for operation after 35 years. The packaging and logistics center will be kept at the location. Later, a smaller brewery and innovation center will be built on the site of the brewery headquarters.

== Brewing museum ==
There is an organised tour at the Brewery, with a small museum dedicated to the famous beer.

== Brands ==
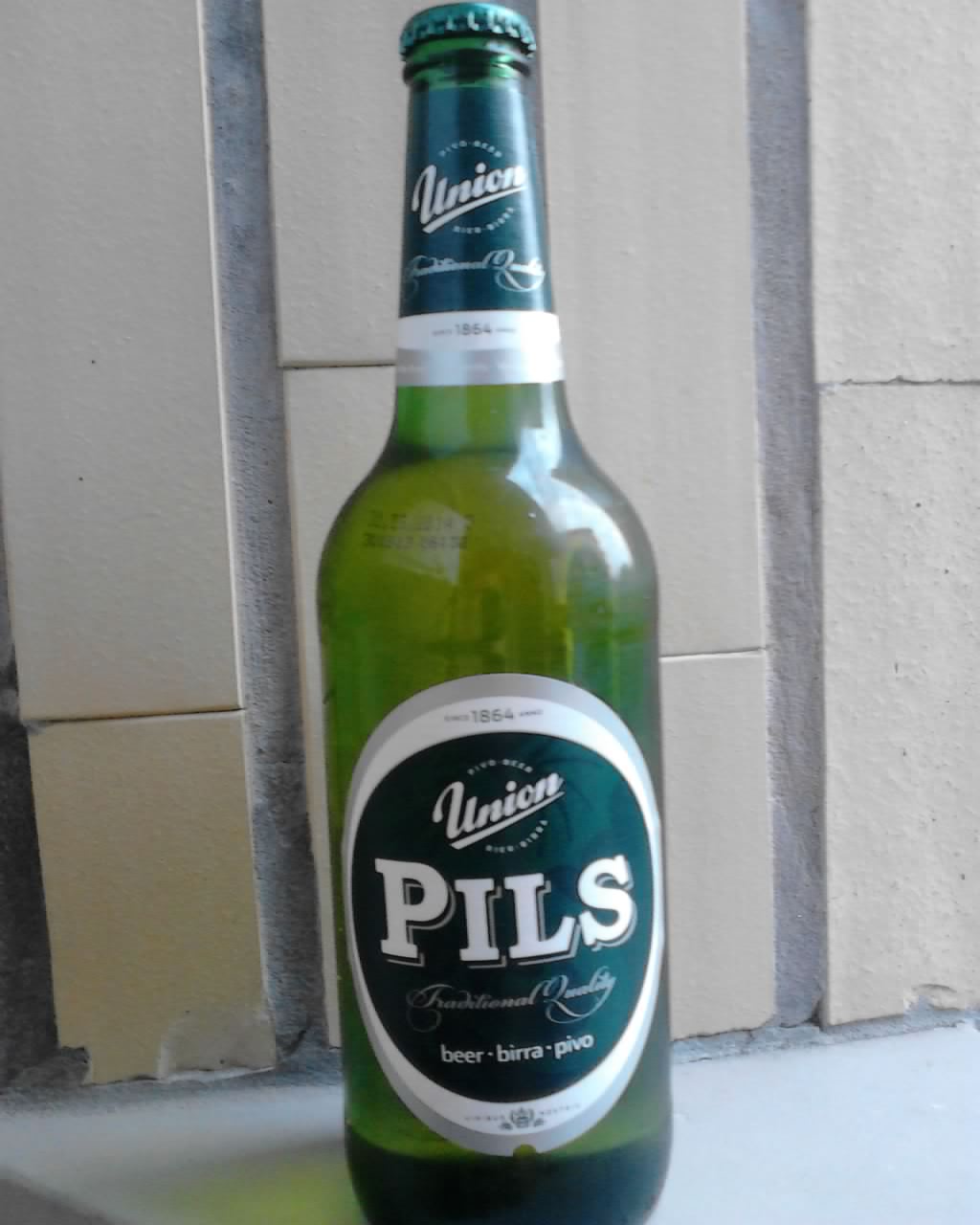
A bottle of Union Pils

- Beer:
  - Union, Pils, Smile, Tivoli
  - Temno pivo, Črni Baron
  - Brezalkoholno pivo Uni
  - Radler
- Non-alcohol drinks "Sola"
- Water
  - Zala
  - Za lemon
  - Za life
  - Za harmony
  - Za symphony
  - Za fantasy
