= Miha Vašl =

Slovenian basketball player

Personal information
- Born: March 2, 1992 (age 34) Celje, Slovenia
- Listed height: 1.92 m (6 ft 4 in)

Career information
- Playing career: 2008–present
- Position: Shooting guard

Career history
- 2008–2014: Hopsi Polzela
- 2014–2016: Zlatorog Laško
- 2016–2017: Châlons-Reims
- 2017–2018: Levickí Patrioti
- 2018–2019: Rogaška
- 2019–2020: Hopsi Polzela
- 2020–2021: BC Prievidza
- 2021-2022: Hopsi Polzela
- 2022-2023: HDL Nardo
- 2023: Fortitudo Bologna
- 2023-2024: Avellino Basket

Career highlights
- Slovak Extraliga champion (2018)

Miha Vašl (born March 2, 1992, in Celje, Slovenia) is a Slovenian professional basketball player for Hopsi Polzela of the Slovenian Basketball League. He is a 1.92 m tall Shooting guard.

Vašl spent the 2019–20 season with Hopsi Polzela in Slovenia, averaging 10.9 points and 4.3 assists per game. On July 24, 2020, Vašl signed with BC Prievidza of the Extraliga.
