= Slovenian Basketball Supercup =

Slovenian basketball competition

- Sport: Basketball
- Founded: 2003
- No. of teams: 2
- Country: Slovenia
- Continent: Europe
- Most recent champion: Krka (6th title)
- Most titles: Cedevita Olimpija (14 titles)
- Related competitions: Slovenian Basketball League; Slovenian Cup
- Website: Official website

The Slovenian Basketball Supercup is a men's professional basketball super cup competition in Slovenia, and it is played between the champion of the top-tier Slovenian First League and the winner of the Slovenian Basketball Cup.

== Games ==
Slovenian Basketball Supercup winners
Year	Location	Winners	Runners-up	Score
2003	Postojna	Union Olimpija	Krka	81–63
2004	Maribor	Union Olimpija	Pivovarna Laško	67–61
2005	Škofja Loka	Union Olimpija	Pivovarna Laško	88–79
2007	Polzela	Union Olimpija	Helios Domžale	90–71
2008	Postojna	Union Olimpija	Helios Domžale	67–56
2009	Ljubljana	Union Olimpija	Elektra Esotech	95–62
2010	Maribor	Krka	Union Olimpija	72–61
2011	Rogaška Slatina	Krka	Union Olimpija	80–72
2012	Grosuplje	Krka	Union Olimpija	84–81
2013	Portorož	Union Olimpija	Krka	63–60
2014	Šenčur	Krka	Union Olimpija	68–65
2015	Škofja Loka	Tajfun	Krka	72–60
2016	Podčetrtek	Krka	Helios Suns	81–78
2017	Ljubljana	Petrol Olimpija	Krka	94–76
2018	Ljubljana	Sixt Primorska	Petrol Olimpija	83–71
2019	Podčetrtek	Koper Primorska	Hopsi Polzela	106–74
2020	Kranj	Cedevita Olimpija	Krka	78–67
2021	Ljubljana	Cedevita Olimpija	Krka	78–71
2022	Škofja Loka	Cedevita Olimpija	Helios Suns	112–85
2023	Kranj	Cedevita Olimpija	Kansai Helios Domžale	76–59
2024	Laško	Cedevita Olimpija	Krka	103–73
2025	Polzela	Cedevita Olimpija	Krka	78–76
2026	Nova Gorica	Krka	Cedevita Olimpija	71–67

== Performance by club ==
Slovenian Supercup winners by club
Club	Titles	Years won
Cedevita Olimpija (Note: Including inherited titles of KK Olimpija.)	14	2003, 2004, 2005, 2007, 2008, 2009, 2013, 2017, 2020, 2021, 2022, 2023, 2024, 2025
Krka	6	2010, 2011, 2012, 2014, 2016, 2026
Koper Primorska	2	2018, 2019
Šentjur	1	2015
