= KK Škofja Loka =

LTH Castings
- Leagues: Slovenian Second League
- Founded: 1954; 71 years ago
- Arena: Poden Sports Hall
- Location: Škofja Loka, Slovenia
- Team colors: White, blue
- President: Anže Kalan
- Head coach: Dejan Prokić
- Website: www.kklub-skofjaloka.si

Košarkarski klub Škofja Loka (English: Škofja Loka Basketball Club), commonly referred to as KK Škofja Loka, is a men's basketball team based in Škofja Loka, Slovenia. The club was founded in 1954 and currently competes under the name LTH Castings due to sponsorship reasons.

Its women's team made four appearances in the Ronchetti Cup through the first half of the 1990s. Their best result in the Slovenian Women's Basketball League is third place, achieved in 1992 and 1995. In 2011, the club withdrew from the championship.

== Honours ==
- Slovenian Second League

Winners: 1996–97, 2004–05, 2014–15, 2021–22
