= KK Triglav Kranj =

Triglav Kranj
- Leagues: Slovenian First League; ABA League Second Division
- Founded: 1950; 76 years ago
- Arena: Planina Sports Hall
- Location: Kranj, Slovenia
- Team colors: White, blue
- Main sponsor: ECE d.o.o.
- President: Slavko Ovčina
- Head coach: Danijel Radosavljević
- Website: Official website
Home	Away

Košarkarski klub Triglav Kranj (English: Triglav Kranj Basketball Club), commonly referred to as KK Triglav or simply Triglav, is a basketball team based in Kranj, Slovenia. The club was founded in 1950 as a basketball section of TVD Partizan Kranj. It was renamed as KK Triglav in 1954 and currently competes as ECE Triglav due to sponsorship reasons. They play their home games at the Planina Sports Hall in Kranj.
