= KK Lastovka =

- Founded: 1997; 28 years ago
- Arena: Komunalni center Hall
- Capacity: 2,500
- Location: Domžale, Slovenia
- Team colors: Yellow, black
- President: Peter Filip Ivanuš
- Website: Official website

Košarkarski klub Lastovka (English: Lastovka Basketball Club), commonly referred to as KK Lastovka or simply Lastovka, is a Slovenian basketball club based in Domžale. The club was founded in 1997. In the summer of 2016 the senior team merged with KOŠ Koper to form KK Primorska. The club currently competes only with youth selections.

== Honours ==
Cup

- Slovenian Cup:

Runners-up: 2016
