= KK Portorož =

- Nickname: Mornarji (Sailors)
- Leagues: Slovenian Second League
- Founded: 1992; 34 years ago
- Arena: Lucija Sports Hall
- Location: Portorož, Slovenia
- Team colors: Orange, blue, white
- President: Branko Cvetičanin
- Head coach: Predrag Milović
- Website: Official website
Home

Košarkarski klub Portorož (English: Portorož Basketball Club), commonly referred to as KK Portorož or simply Portorož, is a Slovenian basketball club based in Portorož. The club was founded in 1992.

The club debuted in the Slovenian First Basketball League in the 2013–14 season.

== Honours ==
- Slovenian Second League

Winners: 2012–13
