= KK Šentjur =

Basketball club in Šentjur, Slovenia

- Leagues: Slovenian First League
- Founded: 1969; 57 years ago
- Arena: OŠ Hruševec Šentjur
- Location: Šentjur, Slovenia
- Team colors: Red, blue
- President: Dušan Debenak
- Head coach: Gašper Škoberne
- Championships: 1 Slovenian Championship; 1 Slovenian Supercup
- Website: kksentjur.net
Home	Away

Košarkarski klub Šentjur (English: Šentjur Basketball Club), commonly referred to as KK Šentjur or simply Šentjur, is a basketball team based in Šentjur, Slovenia. The team currently competes in the Slovenian First League, the top tier of Slovenian basketball.

== History ==
The club was founded in 1969 as a basketball section of TVD Partizan. In the 2014–15 season, Šentjur won its first domestic title. Although they were only ranked fifth before the play-offs, they upset the defending champions, Krka, in the semifinals, and defeated Rogaška 3–1 in the final.

== Honours ==
League

- Slovenian First League

Winners: 2014–15

- Slovenian Second League

Winners: 1999–2000

Cup

- Slovenian Basketball Cup

Runners-up: 2021

- Slovenian Supercup

Winners: 2015
