= KK Šenčur =

Basketball club in Šenčur, Slovenia

GGD Šenčur
- Leagues: Slovenian First League; ABA League Second Division
- Founded: 1973; 53 years ago
- Arena: Šenčur Sports Hall
- Capacity: 800
- Location: Šenčur, Slovenia
- Team colors: Yellow, blue
- Main sponsor: Gorenjska gradbena družba
- President: Roman Horvat
- Head coach: Gašper Sluga
- Website: kksencur.si
Home	Away

Košarkarski klub Šenčur (transl. Šenčur Basketball Club), commonly referred to as KK Šenčur or GGD Šenčur due to sponsorship reasons, is a men's basketball club based in Šenčur, Slovenia. The club was founded in 1973.

== Honours ==
- Slovenian Second League
  - Winners (1): 2013–14
- Slovenian Basketball Cup
  - Runners-up (1): 2017–18
