= KK Rogaška =

Rogaška
- Leagues: Slovenian First League
- Founded: 1998; 27 years ago
- Arena: ŠD Rogaška Slatina
- Capacity: 800
- Location: Rogaška Slatina, Slovenia
- Team colors: Blue, white
- President: Kristijan Novak
- Head coach: Damjan Novaković
- Website: kkrogaska.si
Home	Away

Košarkarski klub Rogaška (English: Rogaška Basketball Club), commonly referred to as KK Rogaška or simply Rogaška, is basketball team from Rogaška Slatina, Slovenia, playing in the Slovenian top division.

== History ==
The first basketball club in Rogaška Slatina was founded in the early 1960s. After Slovenia's independence, the team played in the top division and FIBA Korać Cup. In 1997, the club abolished senior team due to financial problems and competed only in youth competitions, before in February 1998 the club was re-founded as KK Rogaška 98. Rogaška earned promotion to the top division in 2011. In the 2014–15 and 2016–17 seasons, Rogaška reached the championship finals, where they lost 3–1 on both occasions, to Tajfun and Union Olimpija, respectively.

== Players ==
=== Current roster ===
Note: Flags indicate national team eligibility at FIBA-sanctioned events. Players may hold other non-FIBA nationalities not displayed.

Rogaška roster
Players
Coaches

Pos.	No.	Nat.	Name	Ht.	Age
C	2	(United States)	Riley, Cody	2.06 m (6 ft 9 in)	27 – 12 December 1997
G	3	(United States)	Jean-Baptiste, David	1.85 m (6 ft 1 in)	26 – 16 May 1998
C	4	(Slovenia)	Durnik, Urban	2.04 m (6 ft 8 in)	27 – 19 June 1997
PG	5	(Slovenia)	Močnik, Domen	1.92 m (6 ft 4 in)	23 – 16 March 2002
G	6	(Slovenia)	Tabak, Patrik	1.95 m (6 ft 5 in)	24 – 15 April 2000
SG	7	(Slovenia)	Špan, Jure	1.93 m (6 ft 4 in)	29 – 3 April 1995
F	9	(Slovenia)	Sivka, Staš	2.08 m (6 ft 10 in)	21 – 27 June 2003
PG	11	(Slovenia)	Kavkler, Patrik	1.85 m (6 ft 1 in)	21 – 31 July 2003
PF	13	(Slovenia)	Kraljević, Luka	2.08 m (6 ft 10 in)	27 – 4 December 1997
PF	16	(Slovenia)	Colnarič, Tadej	2.02 m (6 ft 8 in)	19 – 10 December 2005
PF	17	(Slovenia)	Branković, Miloš	1.96 m (6 ft 5 in)	21 – 12 April 2003
PF	18	(Croatia)	Miličević, Ivan	2.05 m (6 ft 9 in)	29 – 31 December 1995
G		(Slovenia)	Tišma, Vito	1.85 m (6 ft 1 in)	18 – 10 October 2006
SG		(Slovenia)	Voh, Drejc	1.85 m (6 ft 1 in)	18 – 21 November 2006
PF		(Slovenia)	Šimunić, Maj	1.96 m (6 ft 5 in)	18 – 26 May 2006
G		(Slovenia)	Pešak, Juš	1.92 m (6 ft 4 in)	21 – 22 December 2003

Head coach

- (Slovenia) Peter Markovinovič

Assistant coach(es)

- (Slovenia) Željko Jotić

Strength & conditioning coach(es)

- (Slovenia) Igor Justin

Physiotherapist(s)

- (Slovenia) Reni Novak

Legend

- (C) Team captain
- Injured

- Roster
Updated: 23 September 2022
