= KD Hopsi Polzela =

Hopsi Polzela
- Leagues: Slovenian First League
- Founded: 1972; 54 years ago
- Arena: Polzela Sports Hall
- Location: Polzela, Slovenia
- Team colors: Yellow, blue
- Head coach: Nejc Kobal
- Championships: 1 Slovenian Cup
- Website: Official website
Home	Away

Košarkarsko društvo Hopsi Polzela, commonly referred to as Hopsi Polzela or simply Hopsi, is a Slovenian basketball team based in Polzela that competes in the Slovenian First League, the top tier of Slovenian basketball. During their golden years in the 1990s, they were known as Kovinotehna Savinjska Polzela due to sponsorship reasons.

== Honours ==
- Slovenian First League

- Runners-up: 1995, 1997, 1998

- 1. B SKL / 2. SKL (second tier)

- Winners: 2007, 2025
- Runners-up: 2006

- Slovenian Cup

- Winners: 1996
- Runners-up: 1994, 1997, 2019

- Slovenian Supercup

- Runners-up: 2019
