= 2019 ABA League Second Division Playoffs =

Basketball league play-offs

Tournament details
- Dates: March 20, 2019 – April 8, 2019
- Season: 2018–19
- Teams: 4
- Defending champions: (Slovenia) Krka

Final positions
- Champions: (Slovenia) Sixt Primorska (1stth title)
- Runners-up: (North Macedonia) MZT Skopje Aerodrom
- Semifinalists: (Serbia) Borac Čačak; (Bosnia and Herzegovina) Spars

Awards
- MVP: (Serbia) Marko Jagodić-Kuridža

The 2019 ABA League Second Division Playoffs is the play-off tournament that decided the winner of the 2018–19 ABA League Second Division season. The playoffs started on March 20, 2019 and ended on April 8, 2019. The winner of the play-offs qualified for the 2019–20 ABA League First Division.

== Qualified teams ==
Round	Team	Ref.
17th	(Slovenia) Sixt Primorska	
19th	(North Macedonia) MZT Skopje Aerodrom	
19th	(Bosnia and Herzegovina) Spars	
22nd	(Serbia) Borac Čačak	

== Bracket ==
Semifinals
March 20–24
(Slovenia) Sixt Primorska	2
(Serbia) Borac Čačak	0
March 20–24
(Bosnia and Herzegovina) Spars	0
(North Macedonia) MZT Skopje Aerodrom	2

Finals
April 1–8
(Slovenia) Sixt Primorska	3
(North Macedonia) MZT Skopje Aerodrom	0

== Semifinals ==
Team 1	Series	Team 2	Game 1	Game 2	Game 3
Sixt Primorska (Slovenia)	2–0	(Serbia) Borac Čačak	78–59	73–69	—
Spars (Bosnia and Herzegovina)	0–2	(North Macedonia) MZT Skopje Aerodrom	70–71	70–84	—

=== Game 1 ===
==== Sixt Primorska v Borac Čačak ====
20 March 2019	Sixt Primorska (Slovenia)	78–59 (Series: 1–0)	(Serbia) Borac Čačak	Koper
18:00	Scoring by quarter: 19–12, 15–17, 25–12, 19–18
	Pts: Harris 16; Rebs: Jagodić-Kuridža 15; Asts: Šiško 17	Report	Pts: Majstorović 13; Rebs: S. Gavrilović, I. Gavrilović 5 Asts: R. Đoković	Arena: Arena Bonifika; Attendance: 1,000; Referees: Igor Dragojević, Vladan Šundić, Vladimir Marić

==== Spars v MZT Skopje Aerodrom ====
20 March 2019	Spars (Bosnia and Herzegovina)	70–71 (Series: 0–1)	(North Macedonia) MZT Skopje Aerodrom	Sarajevo
20:00	Scoring by quarter: 19–9, 23–18, 14–26, 14–18
	Pts: Kamenjaš 15; Rebs: Kamenjaš 11; Asts: Protić 5	Report	Pts: three players 13; Rebs: Samardžiski 11; Asts: Medford 5	Arena: Novo Sarajevo Sports Hall; Attendance: 2,100; Referees: Marko Juras, Radoš Savović, Krunoslav Peić

=== Game 2 ===
==== Borac Čačak v Sixt Primorska ====
24 March 2019	Borac Čačak (Serbia)	69–73 (Series: 0–2)	(Slovenia) Sixt Primorska	Čačak
21:00	Scoring by quarter: 19–26, 21–15, 11–18, 18–14
	Pts: I. Đoković 20; Rebs: I. Gavrilović 8 Asts: I. Đoković 6 PIR: I. Đoković 21	Report	Pts: Harris 20; Rebs: Jagodić-Kuridža 13; Asts: Jagodić-Kuridža 6 PIR: Jagodić-Kuridža 27	Arena: Borac Hall; Attendance: 2,500; Referees: Sreten Radović, Miloš Koljenšić, Bojan Kruljac

==== MZT Skopje Aerodrom v Spars ====
24 March 2019	MZT Skopje Aerodrom (North Macedonia)	84–70 (Series: 2–0)	(Bosnia and Herzegovina) Spars	Skopje
17:00	Scoring by quarter: 20–16, 21–21, 19–15, 24–18
	Pts: Ivanov 24; Rebs: Ivanov 9 Asts: Medford 9 PIR: Ivanov 31	Report	Pts: Protić 16; Rebs: Durmo 11; Asts: Protić 4 PIR: Durmo 16	Arena: Jane Sandanski Arena; Attendance: 2,123; Referees: Uroš Nikolić, Vladimir Vesković, Aleksandar Milojević

== Finals ==
Team 1	Series	Team 2	Game 1	Game 2	Game 3	Game 4	Game 5
Sixt Primorska (Slovenia)	3–0	(North Macedonia) MZT Skopje Aerodrom	93–71	95–72	66–61	—	—

=== Game 1 ===
1 April 2019	Sixt Primorska (Slovenia)	93–71 (Series: 1–0)	(North Macedonia) MZT Skopje Aerodrom	Koper
18:00	Scoring by quarter: 28–19, 25–19, 23–16, 17–17
	Pts: Harris 24; Rebs: Čakarun, Jagodić-Kuridža 8 Asts: Šiško 13; PIR: Harris 25	Boxscore	Pts: Ivanov 13; Rebs: Woodard 9 Asts: Magdevski 6 PIR: Woodard 13	Arena: Arena Bonifika; Attendance: 2,000; Referees: Mario Majkić, Dragan Porobić, Radoš Arsenijević

=== Game 2 ===
2 April 2019	Sixt Primorska (Slovenia)	95–72 (Series: 2–0)	(North Macedonia) MZT Skopje Aerodrom	Koper
20:00	Scoring by quarter: 25–20, 18–13, 25–14, 27–25
	Pts: Čakarun 26; Rebs: Jagodić-Kuridža 7 Asts: Šiško 8 PIR: Čakarun 34	Boxscore	Pts: Medford 22; Rebs: Medford 5 Asts: Medford 5 PIR: Medford 18	Arena: Arena Bonifika; Attendance: 2,300; Referees: Damir Javor, Gordan Terlević, Krunoslav Peić

=== Game 3 ===
4 April 2019	MZT Skopje Aerodrom (North Macedonia)	61–66 (Series: 0–3)	(Slovenia) Sixt Primorska	Skopje
18:00	Scoring by quarter: 21–19, 13–20, 9–17, 18–10
	Pts: Bojić 20; Rebs: Bojić, Medford 8 Asts: Medford 3	Boxscore	Pts: Jagodić-Kuridža 17; Rebs: Jagodić-Kuridža 14; Asts: Šiško 7	Arena: Jane Sandanski Arena; Attendance: 1,500; Referees: Uroš Obrknežević, Branislav Mrdak, Vladimir Marić

== See also ==
- 2019 ABA League First Division Playoffs
