= 2019–20 ABA League Second Division =

ABA League Second Division
- Season: 2019–20
- Duration: October 2, 2019 – May 26, 2020
- Teams: 12
- TV partner(s): Arena Sport

Finals
- Champions: None declared
- All statistics correct as of May 28, 2020.

The 2019–20 ABA League Second Division was the 3rd season of the ABA Second Division with 12 teams from Bosnia and Herzegovina, Croatia, Montenegro, North Macedonia, Serbia, and Slovenia participating in it.

On 12 March 2020, the ABA League Assembly temporarily suspended its competitions due to the COVID-19 pandemic. On 27 May 2020, the ABA League Assembly canceled definitely its competitions due to the COVID-19 pandemic. The ABA League Assembly decided not to recognize any team as the champion for the season, and decided to award the two wild cards for the 2020–21 ABA First League season to Borac Čačak and Split.

== Teams ==
=== Team allocation ===
The labels in the parentheses show how each team qualified for the place of its starting round:

- 1st, 2nd, etc.: National League position after Playoffs
- WC: Wild card

Regular season
(Bosnia and Herzegovina) Široki (1st)	(Serbia) Borac Čačak (1st)	(Montenegro) Sutjeska (3rd)	(Slovenia) Helios Suns (4th)
(Bosnia and Herzegovina) Spars Realway (2nd)	(Serbia) Novi Pazar (2nd)	(Montenegro) Lovćen 1947 Bemax (4th)	(Slovenia) Rogaška (6th)
(Bosnia and Herzegovina) Sloboda Tuzla (4th)^{WC}	(Serbia) Dynamic VIP PAY (3rd)^{WC}	(Croatia) Split (4th)	(North Macedonia) MZT Skopje Aerodrom (1st)

=== Venues and locations ===
Location of teams in the 2019–20 ABA League Second Division

Team	Home city	Arena	Capacity
Borac	Čačak	Borac Hall	4,000
Dynamic VIP PAY	Belgrade	Ranko Žeravica Sports Hall	5,000
Helios Suns	Domžale	Komunalni center Hall	2,500
Lovćen 1947 Bemax	Cetinje	Lovćen SC	1,500
MZT Skopje Aerodrom	Skopje	Jane Sandanski	7,500
Novi Pazar	Novi Pazar	Pendik Sports Hall	1,600
Rogaška	Rogaška Slatina	Rogaška Slatina SH	1,100
Sloboda	Tuzla	SKPC Mejdan	4,900
Spars Realway	Sarajevo	Grbavica Sports Hall	1,500
Split	Split	Arena Gripe	3,500
Sutjeska	Nikšić	Nikšić SC	3,000
Široki	Široki Brijeg	Pecara	4,500

=== Personnel and sponsorship ===
Team	Head coach	Captain	Kit manufacturer	Shirt sponsor
Borac	(Serbia) Marko Marinović	(Serbia) Uroš Čarapić	—	P.S. Fashion
Dynamic VIP PAY	(Slovenia) Miro Alilović	(Serbia) Vuk Vulikić	Champion	VIP PAY
Helios Suns	(Slovenia) Dejan Jakara	(Slovenia) Aljaž Bratec	Spalding	Helios, Triglav
Lovćen 1947 Bemax	(Montenegro) Zoran Kašćelan	(Montenegro) Nikola Borilović	NetS	VOLI
MZT Skopje Aerodrom	(North Macedonia) Gjorgji Kočov	(North Macedonia) Damjan Stojanovski	Adidas	Cevahir Holding, UNIBanka
Novi Pazar	(Serbia) Oliver Popović	(Serbia) Nenad Slavković	Cvetex	Barbosa
Rogaška	(Slovenia) Damjan Novaković	(Slovenia) Miha Fon	Nike	—
Sloboda	(Croatia) Damir Mulaomerović	(Bosnia and Herzegovina) Emir Čerkezović	N°1	PAN
Spars Realway	(Bosnia and Herzegovina) Nedim Džemić	(Bosnia and Herzegovina) Adin Vrabac	Adidas	Number 1
Split	(Croatia) Ivica Skelin	(Croatia) Mateo Kedžo	Macron	Bobis
Sutjeska	(Montenegro) Zoran Glomazić	(Montenegro) Boris Lalović	First Ever	EP CG
Široki	(Croatia) Hrvoje Vlašić	(Bosnia and Herzegovina) Jure Zubac	Ardu Sport	Kandit

=== Coaching changes ===
Team	Outgoing manager	Date of vacancy	Position in table	Replaced with	Date of appointment	Ref.
Dynamic VIP PAY	(Serbia) Vladimir Đokić	10 April 2019	Off-season	(Slovenia) Miro Alilović	10 April 2019	
Lovćen 1947 Bemax	(Montenegro) Miodrag Kadija	June 2018	Off-season	(Montenegro) Zoran Kašćelan	26 June 2019	
Borac	(Serbia) Jovica Arsić	June 2018	Off-season	(Serbia) Marko Marinović	29 June 2019	
Široki	(Croatia) Danijel Jusup	August 2018	Off-season	(Croatia) Krunoslav Krajnović	7 August 2019	
Spars Realway	(Bosnia and Herzegovina) Marko Trbić	August 2018	Off-season	(Bosnia and Herzegovina) Goran Šehovac	9 August 2019	
Široki	(Croatia) Krunoslav Krajnović	28 October 2019	4th (3–1)	(Croatia) Hrvoje Vlašić	28 October 2019	
Spars Realway	(Bosnia and Herzegovina) Goran Šehovac	5 November 2019	5th (0–5)	(Bosnia and Herzegovina) Nermin Selimović	5 November 2019	
Sloboda	(Bosnia and Herzegovina) Josip Pandža	28 November 2019	11th (2–7)	(Croatia) Damir Mulaomerović	28 November 2019	
Split	(Croatia) Ante Grgurević	8 December 2019	6th (5–5)	(Croatia) Ivica Skelin	8 December 2019	
Spars Realway	(Bosnia and Herzegovina) Nermin Selimović	28 December 2019	12th (1–12)	(Bosnia and Herzegovina) Nedim Džemić	28 December 2019	

== Regular season ==
=== League table ===
Pos	Team	Pld	W	L	PF	PA	PD	Pts
1	(Serbia) Borac Čačak	22	20	2	1932	1612	+320	42
2	(Croatia) Split	22	13	9	1790	1742	+48	35
3	(North Macedonia) MZT Skopje Aerodrom	22	13	9	1766	1718	+48	35
4	(Montenegro) Sutjeska	22	12	10	1775	1743	+32	34
5	(Bosnia and Herzegovina) Široki	22	11	11	1768	1774	−6	33
6	(Montenegro) Lovćen 1947 Bemax	22	10	12	1721	1766	−45	32
7	(Slovenia) Rogaška	21	10	11	1594	1617	−23	31
8	(Bosnia and Herzegovina) Sloboda	22	9	13	1792	1860	−68	31
9	(Serbia) Novi Pazar	22	8	14	1861	1912	−51	30
10	(Serbia) Dynamic VIP PAY	22	8	14	1660	1742	−82	30
11	(Slovenia) Helios Suns	21	9	12	1593	1679	−86	30
12	(Bosnia and Herzegovina) Spars Realway	22	8	14	1618	1705	−87	30

Source: ABA League Second Division

=== Positions by round ===
First place & advance to the playoffs
Advance to the playoffs
Relegated

Team ╲ Round	1	2	3	4	5	6	7	8	9	10	11	12	13	14	15	16	17	18	19	20	21	22
(Serbia) Borac Čačak	2	2	1	2	1	1	1	1	1	1	1	1	1	1	1	1	1	1	1	1	1	1
(Croatia) Split	1	3	3	5	5	6	7	8	7	6	7	8	7	7	7	5	5	6	4	3	3	2
(North Macedonia) MZT Skopje Aerodrom	3	1	2	1	2	2	2	2	2	2	2	2	2	2	2	2	2	2	2	2	2	3
(Montenegro) Sutjeska	6	7	5	3	3	4	5	3	4	3	4	4	3	5	5	6	6	5	6	5	4	4
(Bosnia and Herzegovina) Široki	8	8	6	4	4	5	4	4	6	7	5	5	5	3	4	4	4	3	3	4	5	5
(Montenegro) Lovćen 1947 Bemax	10	9	9	8	8	7	9	10	10	10	9	9	9	9	10	9	7	8	7	7	7	–
(Slovenia) Rogaška	4	4	8	7	9	8	6	5	5	4	3	3	4	4	3	3	3	4	5	6	6	–
(Bosnia and Herzegovina) Sloboda	11	12	11	10	11	10	11	11	11	11	11	11	11	11	11	11	11	11	10	9	8	–
(Serbia) Novi Pazar	7	6	7	9	10	11	10	9	8	8	10	10	10	10	8	10	10	9	9	11	10	–
(Serbia) Dynamic VIP PAY	12	10	10	11	7	9	8	7	9	9	8	6	8	8	9	8	9	10	11	10	11	–
(Slovenia) Helios Suns	5	5	4	6	6	3	3	6	3	5	6	7	6	6	6	7	8	7	8	8	9	–
(Bosnia and Herzegovina) Spars Realway	9	11	12	12	12	12	12	12	12	12	12	12	12	12	12	12	12	12	12	12	12	12

Source: ABA League Second Division

=== Results ===
Home \ Away	BOR	DYN	HEL	LOV	MZT	NPZ	ROG	SLO	SPA	SPL	SUT	SIR
Borac Čačak	—	87–80	101–55	87–65	95–73	92–76	91–61	99–69	96–62	90–60	81–69	91–69
Dynamic VIP PAY	64–72	—	74–69	71–89	82–92	87–70	60–71	87–83	72–78	86–78	100–97	80–85
Helios Suns	73–80	63–61	—	92–62	78–76	95–86	48–79	91–73	77–80	75–89	83–82	84–70
Lovćen 1947 Bemax	84–96	77–66	81–77	—	73–69	90–94	70–64	97–74	82–66	101–94	81–74	91–83
MZT Skopje Aerodrom	76–69	82–84	85–89	75–74	—	89–87	74–54	110–88	73–64	70–64	88–78	83–71
Novi Pazar	95–99	69–77	83–79	104–77	79–70	—	77–81	74–78	88–86	92–85	79–83	103–87
Rogaška	77–84	71–67	—	85–61	83–90	98–97	—	87–74	78–76	71–80	64–97	74–79
Sloboda	87–96	83–67	101–83	86–80	69–82	102–103	81–79	—	77–73	84–73	102–69	88–86
Spars	89–76	75–81	70–71	69–67	65–77	84–78	57–72	84–70	—	81–84	68–85	66–64
Split	74–76	93–66	90–79	72–63	98–85	116–81	79–73	69–63	84–70	—	87–79	78–76
Sutjeska	80–81	75–69	81–74	87–83	85–70	78–75	84–90	73–70	79–88	78–59	—	82–73
Široki	74–93	83–79	75–58	81–73	89–77	79–71	91–82	98–90	74–67	103–84	78–80	—

Source: ABA League Second Division
Legend: Blue = home team win; Red = away team win.
Matches with lighter background shading were decided after overtime.

== MVP of the Round ==
Round	Player	Team	PIR
1	(Kenya) Nuni Omot	(North Macedonia) MZT Skopje Aerodrom	37
2	(United States) Jabarie Hinds	(North Macedonia) MZT Skopje Aerodrom	33
3	(North Macedonia) Damjan Stojanovski	(North Macedonia) MZT Skopje Aerodrom	29
4	(Slovenia) Tadej Ferme	(Slovenia) Rogaška	27
5	(Serbia) Dušan Beslać	(Serbia) Dynamic VIP PAY	29
6	(Slovenia) Tadej Ferme (2)	(Slovenia) Rogaška	32
7	(Serbia) Aleksa Novaković	(Serbia) Novi Pazar	32
8	(Serbia) Milan Vulić	(Serbia) Novi Pazar	33
9	(Montenegro) Emir Hadžibegović	(Montenegro) Lovćen 1947 Bemax	35
10	(Croatia) Toni Perković	(Croatia) Split	39
11	(Croatia) Goran Filipović	(Bosnia and Herzegovina) Široki	38
12	(Serbia) Đorđe Milošević	(North Macedonia) MZT Skopje Aerodrom	30
13	(United States) James Washington	(Croatia) Split	37
14	(Serbia) Đorđe Milošević (2)	(North Macedonia) MZT Skopje Aerodrom	39
15	(Slovenia) Blaž Mahkovic	(Slovenia) Helios Suns	34
16	(Montenegro) Milutin Đukanović	(Montenegro) Lovćen 1947 Bemax	38
17	(Croatia) Filip Kraljević	(Bosnia and Herzegovina) Široki	40
18	(Slovenia) Blaž Mahkovic (2)	(Slovenia) Helios Suns	42
19	(United States) Jamel Morris	(Croatia) Split	28
20	(Serbia) Branislav Đekić	(Bosnia and Herzegovina) Spars	29
21	(United States) Michael Mallory	(Serbia) Novi Pazar	32

Source: ABA League

== See also ==
- List of current ABA League Second Division team rosters
- 2019–20 ABA League First Division

2019–20 domestic competitions

- 2019–20 Basketball League of Serbia
- (Croatia) 2019–20 HT Premijer liga
- (Slovenia) 2019–20 Slovenian Basketball League
- (Montenegro) 2019–20 Prva A liga
- 2019–20 Basketball Championship of Bosnia and Herzegovina
- (North Macedonia) 2019–20 Macedonian First League
