= 2017–18 Slovenian Basketball League =

Liga Nova KBM^{1}
- Season: 2017–18
- Duration: 13 October 2017 - 29 May 2018
- Teams: 10
- TV partners: RTV Slovenija; Šport TV

Regular season
- Top seed: Petrol Olimpija
- Season MVP: (Slovenia) Smiljan Pavič

Finals
- Champions: Petrol Olimpija (17th title)
- Runners-up: Krka
- Semi-finalists: Rogaška; Sixt Primorska
- Finals MVP: (United States) Devin Oliver

Statistical leaders
Points	(Slovenia) Blaž Mahkovic	19
Rebounds	(Slovenia) Dino Murić	8.3
Assists	(Slovenia) Žan Mark Šiško	7

The 2017–18 Slovenian Basketball League, also known as Liga Nova KBM due to sponsorship reasons, was the 27th season of the Premier A Slovenian Basketball League. Olimpija are the defending champions.

== Format ==
The number of teams was reduced from 12 to only 10 for the 2017–18 season.

=== Regular season ===
In the first phase, ten teams competed in a home-and-away round-robin series (18 games total). All teams advanced from the regular season to one of two postseason stages, depending on their league position.

=== Second phase ===
The top eight teams from the regular season advanced to the championship phase. These teams started the second phase from scratch, with no results carrying over from the regular season. Each team played a total of 14 games in this phase; as in the regular season, a home-and-away round-robin was used.

The top four teams at the end of this stage advanced to the semifinals, conducted as a best-of-three playoff. The semifinal winners advanced to the best-of-five championship finals, with the winners being crowned league champion.

==== Playouts ====
The bottom two teams entered a home-and-away round-robin mini-league with the first, second, third, and fourth-placed teams from the second division, with the two teams finishing on top of the mini-league taking up a place in the next year's 1. A SKL.

== Teams ==
Ilirija was promoted as the winner of the 2016–17 Second League. The team from Ljubljana replaced Terme Olimia Podčetrtek, LTH Castings and Portorož, which finished in the last three positions in the 2016–17 season.

=== Venues and locations ===
Location of teams in the 2017–18 Slovenian Basketball League

Club	Location	Venue	Capacity
Helios Suns	Domžale	Komunalni center Hall	2,500
Hopsi	Polzela	ŠD Polzela	1,800
Krka	Novo Mesto	ŠD Leona Štuklja	2,500
Ilirija	Ljubljana	Tivoli Hall	4,000
Petrol Olimpija	Ljubljana	Arena Stožice	12,500
Rogaška	Rogaška Slatina	ŠD Rogaška Slatina	800
Šenčur	Šenčur	ŠD Šenčur	800
Sixt Primorska	Koper	OŠ Koper Hall	660
Šentjur	Šentjur	Dvorana OŠ Hruševec	700
Zlatorog Laško	Laško	Tri Lilije Hall	2,500

Teams that played in the 2017–18 Adriatic League
Teams that played in the 2017–18 Adriatic League Second Division
Teams that played in the 2017–18 Alpe Adria Cup

=== Personnel and kits ===
Team	President	Coach	Captain	Kit manufacturer	Shirt sponsor
Helios Suns	(Slovenia) David Kubala	(Serbia) Jovan Beader	(Slovenia) Jure Močnik	Spalding	Helios
Hopsi Polzela	(Slovenia) Igor Pungartnik	(Slovenia) Boštjan Kuhar	(Slovenia) Uroš Godler	Macron	–
Ilirija	(Slovenia) Edvard Reven	(Slovenia) Saša Dončić	(Slovenia) Adnan Sarajlić	Spalding	-
Krka	(Slovenia) Brane Kastelec	(Slovenia) Simon Petrov	(Serbia) Dalibor Djapa	Žolna Šport	Krka
Petrol Olimpija	(Slovenia) Tomaž Berločnik	(Slovenia) Zoran Martič	(Slovenia) Domen Lorbek	Macron	Petrol
Rogaška	(Slovenia) Kristijan Novak	(Slovenia) Damjan Novaković	(Slovenia) Miha Fon	Nike	–
Sixt Primorska	(Slovenia) Bojan Čad	(Slovenia) Jurica Golemac	(Slovenia) Nebojša Joksimović	Errea	Sixt
Šenčur	(Slovenia) Janko Sekne	(Slovenia) Rade Mijanović	(Slovenia) Smiljan Pavič	Macron	Gorenjska gradbena družba
Šentjur	(Slovenia) Iztok Špan	(Croatia) Jakša Vulić	(Slovenia) Tomaž Bolčina	Luanvi	-
Zlatorog Laško	(Slovenia) Miro Firm	(Slovenia) Aleš Pipan	(Serbia) Miloš Miljković	Spalding	Pivovarna Laško

=== Managerial changes ===
Team	Outgoing manager	Manner of departure	Date of vacancy	Position in table	Incoming manager	Date of appointment
Sixt Primorska	(Slovenia) Aleksander Sekulić	End of contract	–	Pre-season	(Slovenia) Jurica Golemac	26 May 2017
Šenčur	(Slovenia) Gregor Vodenik	End of contract	–	Pre-season	(Slovenia) Rade Mijanović	17 May 2017
Šentjur	(Slovenia) Jurica Golemac	End of contract	–	Pre-season	(Slovenia) Andrej Žakelj	26 May 2017
Helios Suns	(Slovenia) Dejan Cikić	End of interim spell	-	Pre-season	(Serbia) Jovan Beader	8 May 2017
Šentjur	(Slovenia) Andrej Žakelj	Mutual consent	26 December 2017	9th (3–7)	(Croatia) Jakša Vulić	27 December 2017
Petrol Olimpija	(Slovenia) Gašper Okorn	Mutual consent	8 Januar 2018	2nd (7–5)	(Slovenia) Zoran Martič	8 Januar 2018

== Regular season ==
=== Standings ===
Pos	Team	Pld	W	L	PF	PA	PD	Pts	Qualification
1	Sixt Primorska	18	13	5	1411	1332	+79	31	Qualification to championship group
2	Rogaška	18	11	7	1322	1345	−23	29	Qualification to championship group
3	Petrol Olimpija	18	10	8	1459	1373	+86	28	Qualification to championship group
4	Šenčur	18	10	8	1370	1376	−6	28	Qualification to championship group
5	Helios Suns	18	10	8	1405	1358	+47	28	Qualification to championship group
6	Ilirija	18	9	9	1395	1432	−37	27	Qualification to championship group
7	Krka	18	9	9	1457	1452	+5	27	Qualification to championship group
8	Šentjur	18	7	11	1360	1479	−119	25	Qualification to championship group
9	Hopsi Polzela	18	6	12	1402	1384	+18	24	Qualification to relegation group
10	Zlatorog Laško	18	5	13	1337	1387	−50	23	Qualification to relegation group

Source: KZS.si

== Second stage ==
=== Championship group ===
Pos	Team	Pld	W	L	PF	PA	PD	Pts	Qualification
1	Petrol Olimpija	14	12	2	1153	992	+161	26	Qualification to playoffs
2	Sixt Primorska	14	10	4	1083	1037	+46	24	Qualification to playoffs
3	Krka	14	9	5	1177	1062	+115	23	Qualification to playoffs
4	Rogaška	14	7	7	1036	1012	+24	21	Qualification to playoffs
5	Helios Suns	14	7	7	1100	1090	+10	21	
6	Šenčur GGD	14	5	9	1048	1166	−118	19	
7	Ilirija	14	4	10	1056	1138	−82	18	
8	Šentjur	14	2	12	956	1112	−156	16	

Source: KZS

=== Relegation group ===
Pos	Team	Pld	W	L	PF	PA	PD	Pts	Relegation
1	Hopsi Polzela (O)	10	8	2	909	771	+138	18	
2	Zlatorog Laško (O)	10	8	2	823	695	+128	18	
3	Terme Olimia Podčetrtek	10	6	4	784	790	−6	16	Relegation
4	Mesarija Prunk Sežana	10	4	6	794	808	−14	14	Relegation
5	LHT Castings	10	3	7	796	879	−83	13	Relegation
6	Celje	10	1	9	708	871	−163	11	Relegation

Source: KZS
(O) Play-off winners

== Playoffs ==
Semi-finals
Petrol Olimpija	92	73
Rogaška	79	67
Sixt Primorska	88	61	72
Krka	71	75	74

Final
Petrol Olimpija	90	78	67	89	95
Krka	69	80	83	79	90

== Awards ==
=== Regular season MVP ===
- (Slovenia) Smiljan Pavič (Šenčur)

=== Season MVP ===
- (Slovenia) Smiljan Pavič (Šenčur)

=== Finals MVP ===
- (United States) Devin Oliver (Petrol Olimpija)

=== Weekly MVP ===
==== Regular season ====
Week	MVP	Club	Efficiency
1	(Saint Vincent and the Grenadines) Shawn King	Sixt Primorska	25
2	(United States) Devin Oliver	Petrol Olimpija	25
3	(Slovenia) Smiljan Pavič	Šenčur	41
4 ^{c}	(Slovenia) Domen Bratož	Krka	26
4 ^{c}	(Slovenia) Nejc Zupan	Sixt Primorska	26
5	(Slovenia) Žan Mark Šiško	Ilirija	32
6	(Serbia) Miloš Pešić	Šentjur	45
7	(Croatia) Roko Badžim	Petrol Olimpija	31
8	(United States) Chauncey Collins	Hopsi Polzela	32
9	(Slovenia) Mitja Nikolić	Rogaška	43
10	(United States) Devin Oliver (2)	Petrol Olimpija	38
11	(Slovenia) Mitja Nikolić (2)	Rogaška	44
12	(Slovenia) Smiljan Pavič (2)	Šenčur	34
13	(United States) Rashun Davis	Rogaška	33
14	(United States) Corey Allen	Šentjur	33
15	(Slovenia) Blaž Mahkovic	Helios Suns	26
16	(Slovenia) Jure Pelko	Helios Suns	34
17	(Slovenia) Smiljan Pavič (3)	Šenčur	27
18	(Croatia) Ivan Batur	Rogaška	33

Note

^c – Co-MVP's were announced.

==== Second round ====
Week	MVP	Club	Efficiency
1	(Serbia) Miloš Pešić	Šentjur	30
2	(Croatia) Marjan Čakarun	Sixt Primorska	25
3	(United States) Rashun Davis	Rogaška	26
4	(Slovenia) Smiljan Pavič	Šenčur	38
5	(Serbia) Aleksa Nikolić	Ilirija	36
6	(Croatia) Marjan Čakarun (2)	Sixt Primorska	28
7	(Serbia) Marko Jošilo	Krka	39
8	(Slovenia) Gregor Hrovat	Petrol Olimpija	30
9	(Slovenia) Blaž Mahkovic	Helios Suns	30
10	(United States) Jordan Morgan	Petrol Olimpija	23
11 ^{c}	(United States) Devin Oliver	Petrol Olimpija	24
11 ^{c}	(Slovenia) Matic Rebec	Sixt Primorska	24
12	(Australia) Mitch McCarron	Petrol Olimpija	36
13	(Slovenia) Blaž Mahkovic (2)	Helios Suns	33
14	(Slovenia) Žan Mark Šiško	Ilirija	27

Note

^c – Co-MVP's were announced.

== Statistical leaders ==
=== Performance Index Rating ===
Pos	Player	Club	PIR
1	(Slovenia) Smiljan Pavič	Šenčur	19.63
2	(Croatia) Marjan Čakarun	Sixt Primorska	19.18
3	(Slovenia) Blaž Mahkovic	Helios Suns	19.06

=== Points ===
Pos	Player	Club	PPG
1	(Slovenia) Blaž Mahkovic	Helios Suns	18.97
2	(Serbia) Miloš Pešić	Šentjur	17.55
3	(Slovenia) Dino Murić	Šenčur	16.53

=== Rebounds ===
Pos	Player	Club	RPG
1	(Slovenia) Dino Murić	Šenčur	8.27
2	(Saint Vincent and the Grenadines) Shawn King	Sixt Primorska	8.21
3	(Slovenia) Smiljan Pavič	Šenčur	8.20

=== Assists ===
Pos	Player	Club	APG
1	(Slovenia) Žan Mark Šiško	Ilirija	7.03
2	(Slovenia) Nejc Barič	Zlatorog Laško	5.89
3	(Slovenia) Jure Močnik	Helios Suns	5.79

== Clubs in European competitions ==
Team	Competition	Progress	Ref
Petrol Olimpija	Champions League	Regular season	
