= 2019–20 ABA League First Division =

ABA League 19th season

ABA League First Division
- Season: 2019–20
- Duration: October 4, 2019 – May 26, 2020
- Teams: 12
- TV partners: Arena Sport, O2.TV

Regular season
- Top seed: (Basketball Federation of Serbia) Partizan NIS
- Relegated: None

Finals
- Champions: None declared

Records
- Biggest home win: Crvena zvezda 103–61 Igokea (11 November 2019)
- Biggest away win: Mega 57–94 Budućnost (3 November 2019)
- Highest scoring: Olimpija 112–102 Mega (21 December 2019)
- Highest attendance: 16,531; Partizan 87–82 Budućnost (9 February 2020)
- Lowest attendance: 94; Mornar 95–86 Zadar (17 November 2019)
- All statistics correct as of May 28, 2020.

The 2019–20 ABA League First Division was the 19th season of the ABA League with 12 teams from Bosnia and Herzegovina, Croatia, Montenegro, Slovenia and Serbia participating in it. The season started on 4 October 2019 and played its last games on 9 March 2020 due to the COVID-19 pandemic.

On 12 March 2020, the ABA League Assembly temporarily suspended its competitions due to the COVID-19 pandemic. On 27 May 2020, the ABA League Assembly canceled definitely its competitions due to the COVID-19 pandemic.

Crvena zvezda mts was the defending champion and as a consequence of the COVID-19 pandemic, the ABA League Assembly decided not to recognize any team as the champion for the season.

== Teams ==
=== Promotion and relegation ===
A total of 12 teams will contest the league, including 11 sides from the 2018–19 season and one promoted from the 2018–19 Second Division.

Team promoted from the Second Division

- (Slovenia) Koper Primorska

Team relegated to the Second Division

- (Slovenia) Petrol Olimpija

=== Venues and locations ===
Location of teams in the 2019–20 season
Locations of the teams from Belgrade in the 2019–20 season

Team	Home city	Arena	Capacity
(Montenegro) Budućnost VOLI	Podgorica	Morača Sports Center	6,000
(Slovenia) Cedevita Olimpija	Ljubljana	Arena Stožice	12,480
(Croatia) Cibona	Zagreb	Dražen Petrović Hall	5,400
(Serbia) Crvena zvezda mts	Belgrade	Aleksandar Nikolić Hall	8,000
(Serbia) FMP	Belgrade	Železnik Hall	3,000
(Bosnia and Herzegovina) Igokea	Aleksandrovac	Laktaši Sports Hall	3,050
(Slovenia) Koper Primorska	Koper	Arena Bonifika	3,000
(Slovenia) Krka	Novo Mesto	Leon Štukelj Hall	2,500
(Serbia) Mega Bemax	Belgrade	Ranko Žeravica Sports Hall	5,000
(Montenegro) Mornar	Bar	Topolica Sport Hall	2,625
(Serbia) Partizan NIS	Belgrade	Štark Arena	18,386
(Croatia) Zadar	Zadar	Krešimir Ćosić Hall	7,997

=== Personnel and sponsorship ===
Team	Head coach	Captain	Kit manufacturer	Shirt sponsor
Budućnost VOLI	(Montenegro) Petar Mijović	(Montenegro) Suad Šehović	Spalding	VOLI / Tea Medica
Cedevita Olimpija	(Slovenia) Jurica Golemac	(Slovenia) Jaka Blažič	Adidas	Cedevita / Petrol
Cibona	(Bosnia and Herzegovina) Ivan Velić	(Croatia) Marin Rozić	Adidas	Erste Bank
Crvena zvezda mts	(Serbia) Dragan Šakota	(Serbia) Branko Lazić	Nike	mts
FMP	(Serbia) Vladimir Jovanović	(Serbia) Radoš Šešlija	Cvetex	FMP
Igokea	(Bosnia and Herzegovina) Dragan Bajić	(Serbia) Sava Lešić	GBT	m:tel
Koper Primorska	(Slovenia) Andrej Žakelj	(Slovenia) Alen Hodžić	Erreà	Vehicle Rent
Krka	(Croatia) Vladimir Anzulović	(Slovenia) Jure Balažič	Žolna šport	Krka
Mega Bemax	(Serbia) Dejan Milojević	(Bosnia and Herzegovina) Edin Atić	Adidas	Bemax / Tehnomanija
Mornar	(Montenegro) Mihailo Pavićević	(Montenegro) Marko Mijović	Armani	epcg
Partizan NIS	(Italy) Andrea Trinchieri	(Serbia) Novica Veličković	Under Armour	NIS / mts
Zadar	(Croatia) Danijel Jusup	(Croatia) Ive Ivanov	Adidas	OTP Bank / Crodux

=== Coaching changes ===
Team	Outgoing manager	Date of vacancy	Position in table	Replaced with	Date of appointment	Ref.
Budućnost VOLI	(Croatia) Jasmin Repeša	23 April 2019	Off-season	(Montenegro) Petar Mijović	24 April 2019	
Igokea	(Serbia) Dragan Nikolić	June 2019	Off-season	(Serbia) Aleksandar Trifunović	11 June 2019	
Budućnost VOLI	(Montenegro) Petar Mijović	June 2019	Off-season	(Slovenia) Slobodan Subotić	20 June 2019	
Cedevita Olimpija	First	—	Off-season	(Croatia) Slaven Rimac	8 July 2019	
Budućnost VOLI	(Slovenia) Slobodan Subotić	18 October 2019	3rd (2–0)	(Montenegro) Petar Mijović	19 October 2019	
Zadar	(Croatia) Ante Nazor	19 October 2019	12th (0–3)	(Croatia) Danijel Jusup	23 October 2019	
Crvena zvezda mts	(Serbia) Milan Tomić	22 October 2019	8th (1–2)	(Serbia) Andrija Gavrilović (interim)	22 October 2019	
Igokea	(Serbia) Aleksandar Trifunović	30 October 2019	11th (0–4)	(Bosnia and Herzegovina) Dragan Bajić	30 October 2019	
Krka	(Slovenia) Simon Petrov	5 November 2019	8th (2–3)	(Croatia) Vladimir Anzulović	7 November 2019	
Crvena zvezda mts	(Serbia) Andrija Gavrilović (interim)	23 November 2019	6th (4–3)	(Serbia) Dragan Šakota	23 November 2019	
Koper Primorska	(Slovenia) Jurica Golemac	22 December 2019	5th (8–3)	(Slovenia) Andrej Žakelj	22 December 2019	
Cedevita Olimpija	(Croatia) Slaven Rimac	27 January 2020	3rd (10–7)	(Slovenia) Jurica Golemac	27 January 2020	

== Regular season ==
The regular season starts in September 2019 and ends in March 2020.

=== League table ===
Pos	Team	Pld	W	L	PF	PA	PD	Pts
1	(Serbia) Partizan NIS	21	17	4	1754	1538	+216	38
2	(Montenegro) Budućnost VOLI	21	15	6	1713	1517	+196	36
3	(Serbia) Crvena zvezda mts	21	14	7	1758	1562	+196	35
4	(Slovenia) Cedevita Olimpija	21	13	8	1766	1716	+50	34
5	(Montenegro) Mornar	21	13	8	1774	1754	+20	34
6	(Slovenia) Koper Primorska	21	12	9	1640	1687	−47	33
7	(Serbia) FMP	21	10	11	1767	1729	+38	31
8	(Bosnia and Herzegovina) Igokea	21	7	14	1670	1779	−109	28
9	(Croatia) Cibona	21	7	14	1606	1734	−128	28
10	(Croatia) Zadar	21	6	15	1655	1769	−114	27
11	(Serbia) Mega Bemax	21	6	15	1693	1832	−139	27
12	(Slovenia) Krka	21	6	15	1496	1675	−179	27

Source: Adriatic League

=== Positions by round ===
First place & advance to the playoffs
Advance to the playoffs
Qualification to the relegation playoffs
Relegated

Team ╲ Round	1	2	3	4	5	6	7	8	9	10	11	12	13	14	15	16	17	18	19	20	21	22
(Serbia) Partizan NIS	6	7	5	7	7	5	5	6	4	2	2	2	2	2	1	1	1	2	1	1	1	–
(Montenegro) Budućnost VOLI	3	3	3	3	1	1	1	1	1	1	1	1	1	1	2	2	2	1	2	2	2	–
(Serbia) Crvena zvezda mts	1	5	8	5	5	4	6	4	6	5	6	6	7	6	4	3	3	3	3	3	3	–
(Slovenia) Cedevita Olimpija	2	1	2	1	3	2	2	2	2	3	3	3	3	3	3	4	4	4	4	4	4	–
(Montenegro) Mornar	5	4	4	6	6	7	7	7	7	7	7	7	6	7	6	6	5	5	5	5	5	–
(Slovenia) Koper Primorska	12	8	7	4	4	6	4	3	5	4	4	5	5	5	7	7	6	6	6	6	6	–
(Serbia) FMP	4	2	1	2	2	3	3	5	3	6	5	4	4	4	5	5	7	7	7	7	7	–
(Bosnia and Herzegovina) Igokea	7	10	10	11	9	9	10	11	12	10	10	11	10	9	9	8	8	8	8	8	8	–
(Croatia) Cibona	8	9	11	9	10	10	9	9	8	9	9	9	9	11	10	10	10	9	9	10	9	–
(Croatia) Zadar	10	11	12	12	12	12	12	10	11	12	11	10	11	10	11	11	11	11	12	12	10	–
(Serbia) Mega Bemax	11	12	9	10	11	11	11	12	10	11	12	12	12	12	12	12	12	12	11	9	11	–
(Slovenia) Krka	9	6	6	8	8	8	8	8	9	8	8	8	8	8	8	9	9	10	10	11	12	–

Source: ABA League

=== Results ===
Home \ Away	BUD	COL	CIB	CZV	FMP	IGO	PRI	KRK	MEG	MOR	PAR	ZAD
Budućnost VOLI	—	93–80	87–64	20–0 (Note: Match not played.)	—	99–59	80–83	80–60	90–76	93–88	65–60	93–80
Cedevita Olimpija	81–79	—	79–70	75–64	93–89	78–85	69–72	72–56	112–102	90–91	85–69	90–82
Cibona	78–87	82–84	—	72–86	63–81	66–91	80–78	70–67	76–87	88–92	—	89–60
Crvena zvezda mts	81–89	88–73	102–80	—	95–89	103–61	90–64	101–77	88–70	105–82	92–86	—
FMP	89–79	100–105	88–79	79–87	—	78–73	77–65	84–81	98–79	92–83	57–87	94–67
Igokea	72–83	90–95	84–97	79–94	91–82	—	84–88	92–82	69–72	98–91	73–75	79–71
Koper Primorska	75–78	67–90	79–78	78–90	86–81	—	—	67–63	93–87	101–83	68–56	83–78
Krka	73–72	—	69–77	79–77	65–75	76–75	71–89	—	74–69	67–76	61–76	76–74
Mega Bemax	57–94	63–87	72–76	85–103	95–91	87–76	73–79	88–61	—	—	77–98	98–74
Mornar	92–95	77–70	81–73	71–64	85–82	92–78	99–84	82–73	85–68	—	65–76	95–86
Partizan NIS	87–82	96–95	102–66	75–72	90–85	89–73	81–62	102–80	102–88	88–75	—	87–60
Zadar	82–75	101–63	78–82	78–76	81–76	81–88	99–79	77–85	106–100	83–89	57–72	—

Updated to match(es) played on 9 March 2020. Source: ABA League
Legend: Blue = home team win; Red = away team win.
Matches with lighter background shading were decided after overtime.

== Statistical leaders ==
As of 9 March 2020

=== PIR ===
Pos	Player	Club	PIR
1	(United States) Kendrick Perry	Mega Bemax	20.80
2	(United States) Justin Cobbs	Budućnost VOLI	18.60
3	(Montenegro) Marko Simonović	Mega Bemax	18.10
4	(Slovenia) Jaka Blažič	Cedevita Olimpija	17.90
5	(Serbia) Uroš Luković	Mornar	17.67

=== Points ===
Pos	Player	Club	PPG
1	(United States) Kendrick Perry	Mega Bemax	18.50
2	(United States) Bryon Allen	Zadar	18.21
3	(United States) Rashad Vaughn	Igokea	16.50
4	(United States) Glenn Cosey	Krka	16.39
5	(Georgia (country)) Jacob Pullen	Mornar	16.24

=== Rebounds ===
Pos	Player	Club	RPG
1	(Montenegro) Marko Simonović	Mega Bemax	7.62
2	(Croatia) Domagoj Vuković	Zadar	7.52
3	(Serbia) Marko Jagodić-Kuridža	Crvena zvezda mts	7.06
4	(Bosnia and Herzegovina) Edin Atić	Mega Bemax	6.95
5	(Serbia) Uroš Luković	Mornar	6.94

=== Assists ===
Pos	Player	Club	APG
1	(Slovenia) Žan Mark Šiško	Koper Primorska	9.91
2	(United States) Mike Green	Igokea	6.81
3	(United States) Lorenzo Brown	Crvena zvezda mts	6.33
4	(United States) Kendrick Perry	Mega Bemax	6.20
5	(Croatia) Dominik Mavra	Zadar	5.57

Source: ABA League

== MVP List ==
=== MVP of the Round ===
Round	Player	Team	PIR
1	(United States) Lorenzo Brown	(Serbia) Crvena zvezda mts	30
2	(Montenegro) Derek Needham	(Montenegro) Mornar	34
3	(Slovenia) Jaka Blažič	(Slovenia) Cedevita Olimpija	38
4	(United States) Lance Harris	(Slovenia) Koper Primorska	31
5	(United States) Rashawn Thomas	(Serbia) Partizan NIS	31
6	(United States) Billy Baron	(Serbia) Crvena zvezda mts	27
7	(Georgia (country)) Jacob Pullen	(Montenegro) Mornar	30
8	(Croatia) Filip Bundović	(Croatia) Cibona	34
9	(Croatia) Ivan Novačić	(Croatia) Cibona	28
10	(United States) Lorenzo Brown (2)	(Serbia) Crvena zvezda mts	33
11	(United States) Lance Harris (2)	(Slovenia) Koper Primorska	37
12	(Slovenia) Jaka Blažič (2)	(Slovenia) Cedevita Olimpija	48
13	(Montenegro) Marko Simonović	(Serbia) Mega Bemax	35
14	(Croatia) Domagoj Vuković	(Croatia) Zadar	39
15	(Serbia) Uroš Luković	(Montenegro) Mornar	31
16	(United States) Justin Cobbs	(Montenegro) Budućnost VOLI	33
17	(Montenegro) Marko Simonović (2)	(Serbia) Mega Bemax	32
18	(Slovenia) Jaka Blažič (3)	(Slovenia) Cedevita Olimpija	32
19	(Serbia) Uroš Luković (2)	(Montenegro) Mornar	38
20	(United States) Justin Cobbs (2)	(Montenegro) Budućnost VOLI	33
21	(Montenegro) Derek Needham (2)	(Montenegro) Mornar	27

Source: ABA League

=== MVP of the Month ===
Month	Player	Team	Ref.
2019
October	(Serbia) Aleksa Radanov	(Serbia) FMP	
November	(Croatia) Filip Bundović	(Croatia) Cibona	
December	(United States) Rashawn Thomas	(Serbia) Partizan NIS	
2020
January	(Montenegro) Justin Cobbs	(Montenegro) Budućnost VOLI	
February	(Serbia) Uroš Luković	(Montenegro) Mornar	

== Clubs in European competitions ==
Competition	Team	Progress		Result
EuroLeague	(Serbia) Crvena zvezda mts	Regular season		14th (11–17)
EuroCup	(Serbia) Partizan NIS	Quarterfinals	▲ (2)	0–0 against (Russia) UNICS
EuroCup	(Slovenia) Cedevita Olimpija	Regular season Group C		6th (4–6)
EuroCup	(Montenegro) Budućnost VOLI	Regular season Group D		5th (3–7)
Champions League	(Montenegro) Mornar	Regular season Group C		7th (4–10)

== See also ==
- List of current ABA League First Division team rosters
- 2019–20 ABA League Second Division
- 2019 ABA League Supercup
- 2019–20 Junior ABA League
- 2019–20 WABA League

2019–20 domestic competitions

- 2019–20 Basketball League of Serbia
- (Croatia) 2019–20 HT Premijer liga
- (Slovenia) 2019–20 Slovenian Basketball League
- (Montenegro) 2019–20 Prva A liga
- 2019–20 Basketball Championship of Bosnia and Herzegovina

Teams

- 2019–20 KK Cedevita Olimpija season
- 2019–20 KK Crvena zvezda season
- 2019–20 KK Partizan season

== Notes ==
1. Olimpija Ljubljana and Cedevita Zagreb made a merger and established a new club based in Ljubljana in July 2019 under the name Cedevita Olimpija. Cedevita Olimpija has taken the Cedevita Zagreb's spot in the League.
2. Marko Barać was changing Aleksandar Trifunović in his absence.
