= 2018–19 ABA League Second Division =

ABA League Second Division
- Season: 2018–19
- Duration: September 27, 2018 – March 13, 2019 (Regular season); March 20, 2019 – April 8, 2019 (Playoffs)
- Teams: 12
- TV partner(s): Arena Sport

Regular season
- Top seed: Sixt Primorska
- Relegated: (Serbia) Vršac

Finals
- Champions: (Slovenia) Sixt Primorska (1st title)
- Runners-up: (North Macedonia) MZT
- Semifinalists: (Serbia) Borac (Bosnia and Herzegovina) Spars
- Finals MVP: (Serbia) Marko Jagodić-Kuridža

Statistical leaders
Points	(Montenegro) Pavlićević	20.0
Rebounds	(Serbia) Jagodić-Kuridža	8.9
Assists	(Slovenia) Šiško	7.5
Index Rating	(Serbia) Jagodić-Kuridža	22.5

Records
- Biggest home win: Primorska 102–58 Zrinjski (January 30, 2019)
- Biggest away win: Helios 64–109 Primorska (January 17, 2019)
- Highest scoring: Vršac 102–107 Rogaška (January 9, 2019)
- Winning streak: Sixt Primorska; 11 games
- Losing streak: Vršac; 19 games
- All statistics correct as of March 8, 2019.

The 2018–19 ABA League Second Division was the 2nd season of the ABA Second Division with 12 teams from Bosnia and Herzegovina, Croatia, Montenegro, North Macedonia, Serbia, and Slovenia participating in it.

== Format changes ==
On March 13, 2018, the Adriatic League Assembly decided to abolish the National standings and, as of the 2018–19 season, participants are determined only based on the results in the competitions under the umbrella of the Adriatic League (First Division and Second Division). According to that, the promotion to the First Division is possible only from the Second Division. The last placed of the 2017–18 First Division season lose the right to participate in the 2018–19 season and its place is given to the 2017–18 Champion of the Second Division. Also, as of the 2018–19 season, the 11th placed team of the 2018–19 First Division season and the runners-up of the 2018–19 Second Division season will play in the Qualifiers for a spot in the 2019–20 First Division season. The format of the Qualifiers will be best of three, while the home court advantage will be given to the team that played in the First Division in the previous season.

The maximum number of clubs from one country in the First Division is five, while in the Second Division each country will have two participants. The last placed club in the First Division will have a guaranteed place in the Second Division in the following season. The confirmed competition system shall not be changed until the end of the 2024–25 season, if there are no significant changes in the European basketball by then.

Instead of the Final Four tournament, as of the 2018–19 season, the Second Division champion will be given after the Playoffs, where four best teams of the regular season will compete. The last placed club in the 2017–18 season loses the right to participate in the 2018–19 season, regardless of its result in the national championship.

== Teams ==
=== Team allocation ===
Macedonian League champions Rabotnički withdrew their place in 2018–19 season, as well as the semifinalists Kumanovo and Blokotehna. Their place was taken by Serbian team Vršac.

The labels in the parentheses show how each team qualified for the place of its starting round:

- 1st, 2nd, etc.: National League position after Playoffs
- ABA1: Relegated from the First Division
- WC: Wild card

Regular season
(Serbia) Borac (4th)	(Slovenia) Sixt Primorska (3rd)	(Bosnia and Herzegovina) Zrinjski (1st)	(Montenegro) Sutjeska (3rd)
(Serbia) Dynamic VIP PAY (6th)	(Slovenia) Rogaška (4th)	(Bosnia and Herzegovina) Spars (4th)	(Montenegro) Lovćen 1947 (4th)
(Serbia) Vršac (7th)^{WC}	(Slovenia) Helios Suns (5th)^{WC}	(Croatia) Split (4th)	(North Macedonia) MZT Skopje Aerodrom (ABA1)

=== Venues and locations ===
Location of teams in the 2018–19 ABA League Second Division

Team	Home city	Arena	Capacity
Borac	Čačak	Borac Hall	4,000
Dynamic VIP PAY	Belgrade	Ranko Žeravica Sports Hall	5,000
Helios Suns	Domžale	Komunalni center Hall	2,500
Lovćen 1947	Cetinje	Lovćen SC	1,500
MZT Skopje Aerodrom	Skopje	Jane Sandanski	7,500
Rogaška	Rogaška Slatina	Rogaška Slatina SH	1,100
Sixt Primorska	Koper	Arena Bonifika	3,000
Spars	Sarajevo	Grbavica SH	1,500
Split	Split	Arena Gripe	3,500
Sutjeska	Nikšić	Nikšić SC	3,000
Vršac	Vršac	Millennium Hall	4,400
Zrinjski	Mostar	Bijeli Brijeg Hall	1,000

=== Personnel and sponsorship ===
Team	Head coach	Captain	Kit manufacturer	Shirt sponsor
Borac	(Serbia) Jovica Arsić	(Serbia) Marko Marinović	—	P.S. Fashion
Dynamic VIP PAY	(Serbia) Vladimir Đokić	(Serbia) Vuk Vulikić	NAAI	VIP PAY
Helios Suns	(Slovenia) Dejan Jakara	(Slovenia) Aljaž Bratec	Spalding	Helios, Triglav
Lovćen 1947	(Montenegro) Miodrag Kadija	(Montenegro) Nikola Borilović	NetS	VOLI
MZT Skopje Aerodrom	(North Macedonia) Gjorgji Kočov	(North Macedonia) Damjan Stojanovski	Adidas	Cevahir Holding, UNIBanka
Rogaška	(Slovenia) Damjan Novaković	(Slovenia) Miha Fon	Nike	—
Sixt Primorska	(Slovenia) Jurica Golemac	(Slovenia) Alen Hodžić	Nike	Vehicle Rent
Spars	(Bosnia and Herzegovina) Marko Trbić	(Bosnia and Herzegovina) Adin Vrabac	Adidas	—
Split	(Croatia) Ante Grgurević	(Croatia) Mateo Kedžo	Macron	Bobis
Sutjeska	(Montenegro) Zoran Glomazić		First Ever	EP CG
Vršac	(Greece) Darko Kostić	(Montenegro) Miloš Savović	Spirit	Villager
Zrinjski	(Croatia) Hrvoje Vlašić	(Croatia) Ljubo Šamadan	No1	Mostarsko pivo

=== Coaching changes ===
Team	Outgoing manager	Date of vacancy	Position in table	Replaced with	Date of appointment	Ref.
MZT Skopje Aerodrom	(Serbia) Željko Lukajić	3 April 2018	Off-season	(North Macedonia) Gjorgji Kočov	3 April 2018	
Vršac	(Serbia) Goran Topić	April 2018	Off-season	(Serbia) Mihajlo Mitić	April 2018	
Borac	(Serbia) Raško Bojić	9 April 2018	Off-season	(Serbia) Jovica Arsić	9 April 2018	
Split	(Croatia) Ivica Skelin	29 May 2018	Off-season	(Croatia) Vladimir Anzulović	29 May 2018	
Dynamic VIP PAY	(Serbia) Miroslav Nikolić	4 July 2018	Off-season	(Serbia) Vladimir Đokić	4 July 2018	
Lovćen 1947	(Montenegro) Petar Jovanović	23 August 2018	Off-season	(Montenegro) Miodrag Kadija	23 August 2018	
Vršac	(Serbia) Mihajlo Mitić	24 August 2018	Off-season	(Serbia) Branko Maksimović	24 August 2018	
Helios Suns	(Serbia) Jovan Beader	12 November 2018	10th (2–5)	(Slovenia) Dejan Jakara	12 November 2018	
Vršac	(Serbia) Branko Maksimović	4 January 2019	12th (1–13)	(Greece) Darko Kostić	4 January 2019	
Split	(Croatia) Vladimir Anzulović	5 March 2019	7th (8–12)	(Croatia) Ante Grgurević	5 March 2019	

== Regular season ==
=== League table ===
Pos	Team	Pld	W	L	PF	PA	PD	Pts	Qualification or relegation
1	(Slovenia) Sixt Primorska	22	20	2	1867	1521	+346	42	Advance to the Playoffs
2	(Bosnia and Herzegovina) Spars	22	16	6	1641	1578	+63	38	Advance to the Playoffs
3	(North Macedonia) MZT Skopje Aerodrom	22	15	7	1899	1758	+141	37	Advance to the Playoffs
4	(Serbia) Borac Čačak	22	13	9	1757	1690	+67	35	Advance to the Playoffs
5	(Serbia) Dynamic VIP PAY	22	12	10	1776	1727	+49	34	
6	(Montenegro) Sutjeska	22	12	10	1769	1803	−34	34	
7	(Montenegro) Lovćen 1947	22	11	11	1715	1688	+27	33	
8	(Croatia) Split	22	10	12	1711	1712	−1	32	
9	(Bosnia and Herzegovina) Zrinjski	22	8	14	1713	1815	−102	30	
10	(Slovenia) Rogaška	22	7	15	1726	1785	−59	29	
11	(Slovenia) Helios Suns	22	7	15	1642	1772	−130	29	
12	(Serbia) Vršac	22	1	21	1728	2095	−367	23	Relegation

Source: ABA League Second Division

=== Positions by round ===
First place & advance to the playoffs
Advance to the playoffs
Relegated

Team ╲ Round	1	2	3	4	5	6	7	8	9	10	11	12	13	14	15	16	17	18	19	20	21	22
(Slovenia) Sixt Primorska	1	1	1	1	1	1	1	1	1	1	1	1	1	1	1	1	1	1	1	1	1	1
(Bosnia and Herzegovina) Spars	5	8	4	4	3	2	4	3	2	3	4	4	4	3	3	3	3	3	2	2	2	2
(North Macedonia) MZT Skopje Aerodrom	4	2	3	3	4	3	2	2	3	2	2	2	2	2	2	2	2	2	3	3	3	3
(Serbia) Borac Čačak	8	11	8	9	9	7	9	9	8	6	6	8	8	8	8	8	8	6	6	5	5	4
(Serbia) Dynamic VIP PAY	2	4	6	5	5	6	5	5	6	7	8	7	7	7	5	4	4	4	4	4	4	5
(Montenegro) Sutjeska	12	9	5	7	6	5	6	7	9	9	7	6	6	5	7	5	5	5	5	6	6	6
(Montenegro) Lovćen 1947	6	7	10	10	8	9	7	6	5	4	3	3	3	4	6	7	7	8	7	8	7	7
(Croatia) Split	3	3	2	2	2	4	3	4	4	5	5	5	5	6	4	6	6	7	8	7	8	8
(Bosnia and Herzegovina) Zrinjski	11	10	12	12	10	11	11	11	11	11	10	10	9	10	10	10	10	11	11	11	10	9
(Slovenia) Rogaška	7	6	7	6	7	8	8	8	7	8	9	9	11	9	9	9	9	9	9	9	9	10
(Slovenia) Helios Suns	9	5	9	8	11	10	10	10	10	10	11	11	10	11	11	11	11	10	10	10	11	11
(Serbia) Vršac	10	12	11	11	12	12	12	12	12	12	12	12	12	12	12	12	12	12	12	12	12	12

Source: ABA2

=== Results ===
Home \ Away	BOR	DYN	HEL	LOV	MZT	ROG	PRI	SPA	SPL	SUT	VRS	ZRI
Borac Čačak	—	102–72	81–63	77–76	79–74	89–84	65–73	80–84	79–73	92–68	89–71	82–76
Dynamic VIP PAY	89–98	—	79–71	87–88	98–75	91–74	68–58	79–74	72–78	76–51	95–83	88–81
Helios Suns	76–82	75–77	—	77–74	73–92	66–58	64–109	76–69	78–82	84–76	95–78	82–80
Lovćen 1947	75–70	89–82	79–58	—	67–85	72–71	66–80	68–74	63–65	81–87	81–66	83–73
MZT Skopje Aerodrom	82–57	84–74	92–79	100–90	—	84–70	77–78	93–77	104–87	94–73	78–69	97–75
Rogaška	81–88	75–80	68–63	85–95	102–90	—	74–75	70–81	74–69	95–81	92–80	66–62
Sixt Primorska	97–71	82–67	87–58	77–74	91–84	85–80	—	102–61	78–69	93–66	103–77	102–58
Spars	66–63	88–84	79–66	73–64	71–75	63–59	54–69	—	96–58	76–74	67–54	75–73
Split	81–68	72–78	82–76	71–78	76–78	81–69	75–77	60–63	—	109–87	87–69	78–82
Sutjeska	71–64	80–74	78–70	81–71	91–79	94–79	85–82	67–74	83–90	—	109–91	85–73
Vršac	74–100	99–93	74–106	78–103	88–95	102–107	65–103	76–93	80–96	78–100	—	85–91
Zrinjski	84–81	50–73	96–86	71–78	93–87	94–93	63–66	68–83	80–72	78–82	112–91	—

Updated to match(es) played on March 17, 2019. Source: ABA Second Division
Legend: Blue = home team win; Red = away team win.
Matches with lighter background shading were decided after overtime.

== Playoffs ==
=== Bracket ===
Semifinals
March 20–24
(Slovenia) Sixt Primorska	2
(Serbia) Borac Čačak	0
March 20–24
(Bosnia and Herzegovina) Spars	0
(North Macedonia) MZT Skopje Aerodrom	2

Finals
April 1–8
(Slovenia) Sixt Primorska	3
(North Macedonia) MZT Skopje Aerodrom	0

=== Semifinals ===
Team 1	Series	Team 2	Game 1	Game 2	Game 3
Sixt Primorska (Slovenia)	2–0	(Serbia) Borac Čačak	78–59	73–69	—
Spars (Bosnia and Herzegovina)	0–2	(North Macedonia) MZT Skopje Aerodrom	70–71	70–84	—

=== Finals ===
Team 1	Series	Team 2	Game 1	Game 2	Game 3	Game 4	Game 5
Sixt Primorska (Slovenia)	3–0	(North Macedonia) MZT Skopje Aerodrom	93–71	95–72	66–61	—	—

== Promotion playoffs ==
As of the 2018–19 season, the 11th placed team of the 2018–19 First Division season and the runners-up of the 2018–19 Second Division season will play in the Qualifiers for a spot in the 2019–20 First Division season. The format of the Qualifiers will be best of three, while the home court advantage will be given to the team that played in the First Division in the previous season.

=== Teams ===
- First Division 11th place: (Croatia) Zadar
- Second Division 2nd place: (North Macedonia) MZT Skopje Aerodrom

As the team, coming from the ABA League, Zadar had the home court advantage in the first and third game of the series, while MZT was the host of the second game of the Qualifiers series. Zadar won the series 2−1 and kept its First League status.

=== Results ===
Team 1	Series	Team 2	Game 1	Game 2	Game 3
Zadar (Croatia)	2–1	(North Macedonia) MZT Skopje Aerodrom	83–89	78–77	86−75

== MVP of the Round ==
Round	Player	Team	PIR
1	(United States) James Woodard	(North Macedonia) MZT Skopje Aerodrom	25
2	(Serbia) Marko Jagodić-Kuridža	(Slovenia) Sixt Primorska	39
3	(Serbia) Nemanja Protić	(Bosnia and Herzegovina) Spars	35
4	(Bosnia and Herzegovina) Ibrahim Durmo	(Bosnia and Herzegovina) Spars	28
5	(Croatia) Marko Ramljak	(Bosnia and Herzegovina) Zrinjski	41
6	(Serbia) Radovan Đoković	(Serbia) Borac	32
7	(Montenegro) Miloš Popović	(Montenegro) Lovćen 1947	34
8	(Croatia) Ive Ivanov	(North Macedonia) MZT Skopje Aerodrom	27
9	(Croatia) Sven Smajlagić	(Bosnia and Herzegovina) Zrinjski	37
10	(Montenegro) Milutin Đukanović	(Montenegro) Lovćen 1947	35
11	(Bosnia and Herzegovina) Aleksandar Todorović	(Bosnia and Herzegovina) Zrinjski	36
12	(Serbia) Andrija Bojić	(North Macedonia) MZT Skopje Aerodrom	35
13	(Serbia) Miloš Glišić	(Serbia) Dynamic VIP PAY	37
14	(Serbia) Radovan Đoković (2)	(Serbia) Borac	35
15	(Croatia) Pavle Marčinković	(Croatia) Split	36
16	(Montenegro) Nikola Pavličević	(Montenegro) Sutjeska	35
17	(Serbia) Marko Jagodić-Kuridža (2)	(Slovenia) Sixt Primorska	27
18	(Montenegro) Radosav Spasojević	(Montenegro) Sutjeska	29
19	(Bosnia and Herzegovina) Draško Albijanić	(Bosnia and Herzegovina) Spars	37
20	(Serbia) Ilija Đoković	(Serbia) Borac	30
21	(Montenegro) Aleksa Popović	(Montenegro) Lovćen 1947	33
22	(North Macedonia) Predrag Samardžiski	(North Macedonia) MZT Skopje Aerodrom	39
SF1	(Slovenia) Žan Mark Šiško	(Slovenia) Sixt Primorska	28
SF2	(Croatia) Ive Ivanov (2)	(North Macedonia) MZT Skopje Aerodrom	31
F1	(United States) Lance Harris	(Slovenia) Sixt Primorska	26
F2	(Croatia) Marjan Čakarun	(Slovenia) Sixt Primorska	27
F3	(Serbia) Marko Jagodić-Kuridža (3)	(Slovenia) Sixt Primorska	28

Source: ABA League Second Division

== Attendances ==
Attendances do not include playoff games yet:

Pos	Team	Total	High	Low	Average	Change
1	(Serbia) Borac Čačak	14,750	2,200	700	1,341	−22.4%
2	(North Macedonia) MZT Skopje Aerodrom	12,958	1,500	650	1,178	−40.3%^{1}
3	(Montenegro) Lovćen 1947	10,650	1,150	800	968	+11.5%
4	(Serbia) Vršac	9,940	1,150	800	904	−35.4%
5	(Bosnia and Herzegovina) Spars	9,430	1,200	750	857	n/a
6	(Croatia) Split	8,940	900	690	813	+5.9%
7	(Slovenia) Sixt Primorska	8,770	2,000	400	797	−4.9%
8	(Montenegro) Sutjeska	8,190	1,200	300	745	n/a
9	(Slovenia) Rogaška	7,930	950	400	721	−3.2%
10	(Bosnia and Herzegovina) Zrinjski	7,683	900	200	698	−30.2%
11	(Slovenia) Helios Suns	6,040	850	200	549	n/a
12	(Serbia) Dynamic VIP PAY	5,910	950	100	537	−14.4%
	League total	111,191	2,200	100	842	−7.6%

Updated to match(es) played on March 14, 2019. Source: ABA 2 League
Notes:
1: 2017–18 season average applied to ABA League games

== See also ==
- List of current ABA League Second Division team rosters
- 2018–19 ABA League First Division

2018–19 domestic competitions

- 2018–19 Basketball League of Serbia
- (Croatia) 2018–19 Premijer liga
- (Slovenia) 2018–19 Slovenian Basketball League
- (Montenegro) 2018–19 Prva A liga
- 2018–19 Basketball Championship of Bosnia and Herzegovina
- (North Macedonia) 2018–19 Macedonian First League
