= Tadej Ferme =

Slovenian basketball player

No. 4 – Ilirija
- Position: Guard
- League: Slovenian League; ABA League Second Division

Personal information
- Born: October 17, 1991 (age 35) Celje, Slovenia
- Listed height: 1.81 m (5 ft 11 in)
- Listed weight: 89 kg (196 lb)

Career information
- NBA draft: 2013: undrafted
- Playing career: 2007–present

Career history
- 2007–2013: Šentjur
- 2013: Zlatorog Laško
- 2014: Maribor Nova KBM
- 2014–2017: Rogaška
- 2017–2019: Sixt Primorska
- 2019–2020: Rogaška
- 2020–2023: Helios Suns
- 2023-present: Ilirija

Career highlights
- Slovenian League champion (2019); ABA League 2 champion (2019); 2x Slovenian Cup winner (2018, 2019)

Tadej Ferme (born October 17, 1991 in Celje, Slovenia) is a Slovenian professional basketball player for Ilirija of the Slovenian League. He is a 1.86 m tall Guard.

== Professional career ==
Ferme started playing professional basketball for Šentjur.

In September 2013, Ferme signed with Zlatorog Laško. In December, 2013, he parted ways with Zlatorog Laško and signed with Maribor Nova KBM for the rest of the season.

In July 2014, he signed with Rogaška.

In July 2017, Ferme signed a two-year deal with Sixt Primorska. He rejoined Rogaška in 2019 and averaged 14.2 points and 3.2 assists per game. On July 1, 2020, Ferme signed with Helios Suns.
