= 2018–19 Slovenian Basketball League =

Liga Nova KBM^{1}
- Season: 2018–19
- Duration: 11 October 2018 - 24 May 2019
- Games played: 154
- Teams: 10
- TV partner: Šport TV

Regular season
- Relegated: Ilirija

Finals
- Champions: Sixt Primorska
- Runners-up: Petrol Olimpija
- Semi-finalists: Krka; Helios Suns

The 2018–19 Slovenian Basketball League, also known as Liga Nova KBM due to sponsorship reasons, is the 28th season of the Premier A Slovenian Basketball League. Olimpija are the defending champions.

== Format ==
=== Regular season ===
In the first phase, ten teams competed in a home-and-away round-robin series (18 games total). All teams advanced from the regular season to one of two postseason stages, depending on their league position.

=== Second phase ===
The top six teams from the regular season advanced to the championship phase. These teams started the second phase from scratch, with no results carrying over from the regular season. Each team played a total of 10 games in this phase; as in the regular season, a home-and-away round-robin was used.

The bottom four teams entered a home-and-away round-robin mini-league where two best teams qualify to quarterfinals. Each teams plays 9 games in this phase.

==== Playoffs ====
Eight teams joined the playoffs.

== Teams ==
=== Venues and locations ===
Location of teams in the 2018–19 Slovenian Basketball League

Club	Location	Venue	Capacity
Helios Suns	Domžale	Komunalni center Hall	2,500
Hopsi	Polzela	ŠD Polzela	1,800
Krka	Novo Mesto	ŠD Leona Štuklja	2,500
Ilirija	Ljubljana	Tivoli Hall	4,000
Petrol Olimpija	Ljubljana	Arena Stožice	12,500
Rogaška	Rogaška Slatina	ŠD Rogaška Slatina	800
Šenčur	Šenčur	ŠD Šenčur	800
Sixt Primorska	Koper	Arena Bonifika	5,000
Šentjur	Šentjur	Dvorana OŠ Hruševec	700
Zlatorog Laško	Laško	Tri Lilije Hall	2,500

Teams that play in the 2018–19 Adriatic League
Teams that play in the 2018–19 Adriatic League Second Division
Teams that play in the 2018-19 Alpe Adria Cup

=== Personnel and kits ===
Team	President	Coach	Captain	Kit manufacturer	Shirt sponsor
Helios Suns	(Slovenia) David Kubala	(Slovenia) Dejan Jakara	(Slovenia) Jure Močnik	Spalding	Helios
Hopsi Polzela	(Slovenia) Matej Jelen	(Slovenia) Boštjan Kuhar	(Slovenia) Uroš Godler	Macron	—
Ilirija	(Slovenia) Edvard Reven	(Slovenia) Saša Dončić	(Slovenia) Tevž Ružič	Spalding	—
Krka	(Slovenia) Andraž Šuštarič	(Slovenia) Simon Petrov	(Slovenia) Jure Balažič	Žolna Šport	Krka
Petrol Olimpija	(Slovenia) Tomaž Berločnik	(Slovenia) Jure Zdovc	(Slovenia) Mirza Begić	Peak	Petrol
Rogaška	(Slovenia) Kristijan Novak	(Slovenia) Damjan Novaković	(Slovenia) Miha Vašl	Nike	—
Sixt Primorska	(Slovenia) Bojan Čad	(Slovenia) Jurica Golemac	(Slovenia) Alen Hodžić	Nike	Sixt
Šenčur	(Slovenia) Janko Sekne	(Slovenia) Konstantin Subotić	(Slovenia) Smiljan Pavič	Macron	Gorenjska gradbena družba
Šentjur	(Slovenia) Dušan Debenak	(Croatia) Jakša Vulić	(Slovenia) Tomaž Jereb	Luanvi	—
Zlatorog Laško	(Slovenia) Tanja Seme	(United States) Chris Thomas	(Slovenia) Nejc Barič	Spalding	Pivovarna Laško

=== Managerial changes ===
Team	Outgoing manager	Manner of departure	Date of vacancy	Position in table	Incoming manager	Date of appointment
Zlatorog Laško	(Slovenia) Aleš Pipan	End of contact	–	Pre-season	(United States) Chris Thomas	27 July 2018
Helios Suns	(Serbia) Jovan Beader	Sacked	12 November 2018	9th (1–4)	(Slovenia) Dejan Jakara	12 November 2018
Petrol Olimpija	(Slovenia) Zoran Martič	Mutual consent	18 November 2018	1st (4–2)	(Serbia) Saša Nikitović	19 November 2018
Šenčur	(Slovenia) Rade Mijanović	Sacked	30 December 2018	9th (4–6)	(Slovenia) Konstantin Subotić	1 January 2019
Petrol Olimpija	(Serbia) Saša Nikitović	Mutual consent	19 February 2019	4th (10–8)	(Slovenia) Jure Zdovc	19 February 2019

== Regular season ==
=== League table ===
Pos	Team	Pld	W	L	PF	PA	PD	Pts	Qualification
1	Sixt Primorska	18	13	5	1525	1330	+195	31	Qualification to championship group
2	Krka	18	12	6	1466	1374	+92	30	Qualification to championship group
3	Rogaška	18	11	7	1454	1468	−14	29	Qualification to championship group
4	Petrol Olimpija	18	10	8	1422	1426	−4	28	Qualification to championship group
5	Hopsi Polzela	18	10	8	1465	1390	+75	28	Qualification to championship group
6	Helios Suns	18	9	9	1342	1342	0	27	Qualification to championship group
7	Zlatorog Laško	18	9	9	1392	1433	−41	27	Qualification to relegation group
8	Šentjur	18	8	10	1397	1427	−30	26	Qualification to relegation group
9	Šenčur	18	7	11	1416	1445	−29	25	Qualification to relegation group
10	Ilirija	18	1	17	1381	1625	−244	19	Qualification to relegation group

Source: KZS.si

=== Results ===
Home \ Away	HEL	POL	ILI	KRK	UOL	ROG	SEN	TAJ	PRI	ZLA
Helios Suns	—	76–77	78–60	65–77	72–60	75–82	59–64	59–71	84–77	87–65
Hopsi Polzela	68–52	—	85–74	84–67	76–78	90–100	99–76	74–60	83–93	72–77
Ilirija	76–85	73–104	—	83–85	74–104	74–75	62–81	78–82	80–87	69–80
Krka	66–65	84–58	97–91	—	91–69	81–60	77–85	86–65	90–100	79–68
Petrol Olimpija	68–76	98–95	86–65	76–92	—	99–81	82–70	76–72	81–61	72–83
Rogaška	78–91	69–85	106–99	80–76	87–66	—	85–81	88–74	70–64	75–77
Šenčur	90–101	80–85	81–85	90–86	85–62	79–81	—	78–66	77–89	83–80
Šentjur	75–81	84–64	100–98	86–73	89–98	77–80	85–72	—	88–94	77–71
Sixt Primorska	97–50	92–65	117–67	64–66	80–63	87–79	75–66	92–76	—	84–53
Zlatorog Laško	91–86	57–101	92–73	85–93	77–84	93–78	86–78	65–70	92–72	—

Source: KZS.si
Legend: Blue = home team win; Red = away team win.

== Championship group ==
=== League table ===
Pos	Team	Pld	W	L	PF	PA	PD	Pts	Qualification
1	Sixt Primorska	10	10	0	818	650	+168	20	Qualification to playoffs
2	Petrol Olimpija	10	7	3	726	677	+49	17	Qualification to playoffs
3	Hopsi Polzela	10	5	5	727	763	−36	15	Qualification to playoffs
4	Krka	10	4	6	766	751	+15	14	Qualification to playoffs
5	Rogaška	10	3	7	740	833	−93	13	Qualification to playoffs
6	Helios Suns	10	1	9	691	794	−103	11	Qualification to playoffs

Source: KZS.si

=== Results ===
Home \ Away	HEL	POL	KRK	UOL	ROG	PRI
Helios Suns	—	84–75	76–84	63–69	80–82	67–68
Hopsi Polzela	83–61	—	82–81	65–59	81–76	63–81
Krka	86–58	81–61	—	65–70	99–69	62–85
Petrol Olimpija	74–66	93–72	79–60	—	66–58	72–85
Rogaška	90–83	69–85	90–80	70–75	—	67–95
Sixt Primorska	83–53	78–60	81–68	73–69	89–69	—

Source: KZS.si
Legend: Blue = home team win; Red = away team win.

== Relegation group ==
=== League table ===
Pos	Team	Pld	W	L	PF	PA	PD	Pts	Qualification or relegation
1	Šenčur	15	10	5	1213	1141	+72	25	Qualification to playoffs
2	Zlatorog Laško	15	9	6	1199	1119	+80	24	Qualification to playoffs
3	Šentjur	15	8	7	1133	1180	−47	23	
4	Ilirija	15	3	12	1149	1254	−105	18	Relegation

Source: KZS.si

=== Results ===
Home \ Away	ILI	SEN	TAJ	ZLA	ILI	SEN	TAJ	ZLA
Ilirija	—	79–71	64–60	86–89	—	—	—	82–93
Šenčur	84–75	—	92–82	74–69	94–81	—	—	—
Šentjur	71–67	71–69	—	78–81	90–77	85–96	—	—
Zlatorog Laško	86–73	71–81	76–57	—	—	64–79	96–59	—

Updated to match(es) played on 23 April 2019. Source: KZS.si
Legend: Blue = home team win; Red = away team win.

== Playoffs ==
Seeded teams played at home games 1, 3 and, in the finals, 5.

=== Bracket ===
Quarter-finals
Sixt Primorska	2
Zlatorog Laško	0
Krka	2
Rogaška	0
Petrol Olimpija	2
Šenčur	1
Hopsi Polzela	0
Helios Suns	2

Semi-finals
Sixt Primorska	2
Krka	0
Petrol Olimpija	2
Helios Suns	0

Final
Sixt Primorska	3
Petrol Olimpija	0

=== Quarter–finals ===
Team 1	Series	Team 2	Game 1	Game 2	Game 3
Sixt Primorska	2–0	Zlatorog Laško	98–74	89–68	–
Petrol Olimpija	2–1	Šenčur	79–77	70–73	85–73
Hopsi Polzela	0–2	Helios Suns	82–95	78–80	–
Krka	2–0	Rogaška	77–73	80–74	–

=== Semi-finals ===
Team 1	Series	Team 2	Game 1	Game 2	Game 3
Sixt Primorska	2–0	Krka	85–74	88–76	–
Petrol Olimpija	2–0	Helios Suns	74–60	68–49	–

=== Finals ===
Team 1	Series	Team 2	Game 1	Game 2	Game 3	Game 4	Game 5
Sixt Primorska	3–0	Petrol Olimpija	79–61	76–75	68–63	–	–

== Awards ==
=== Regular season MVP ===
- (Croatia) Davor Konjević (Šentjur)

=== Season MVP ===
- (Croatia) Marjan Čakarun (Sixt Primorska)

=== Finals MVP ===
- (Croatia) Marjan Čakarun (Sixt Primorska)

=== All-League Team ===
- (Slovenia) Jan Špan (Petrol Olimpija)
- (Slovenia) Blaž Mahkovic (Helios Suns)
- (United States) Donovon Jack (Hopsi Polzela)
- (Serbia) Marko Jagodić-Kuridža (Sixt Primorska)
- (Croatia) Marjan Čakarun (Sixt Primorska)

=== Regular season Team ===
- (Slovenia) Nejc Barič (Zlatorog)
- (Slovenia) Blaž Mahkovic (Helios Suns)
- (Serbia) Marko Jagodić-Kuridža (Sixt Primorska)
- (Croatia) Davor Konjević (Šentjur)
- (Bosnia and Herzegovina) Ramo Rizvić (Šenčur)

=== Weekly MVP ===
==== Regular season ====
Week	MVP	Club	Efficiency
1	(Slovenia) Luka Lapornik	Krka	33
2	(Bosnia and Herzegovina) Emir Ahmedović	Šentjur	24
3	(Slovenia) Blaž Mahkovic	Krka	34
4	(Croatia) Davor Konjević	Šentjur	28
5	(Croatia) Davor Konjević (2)	Šentjur	32
6	(Montenegro) Marko Simonović	Petrol Olimpija	35
7	(Croatia) Davor Konjević (3)	Šentjur	47
8	(Croatia) Marjan Čakarun	Sixt Primorska	32
9	(Slovenia) Žan Mark Šiško	Sixt Primorska	29
10	(Slovenia) Žan Mark Šiško (2)	Sixt Primorska	34
11	(Serbia) Marko Jagodić-Kuridža	Sixt Primorska	31
12	(United States) Cleveland Thomas	Zlatorog	28
13	(Bosnia and Herzegovina) Ramo Rizvić	Šenčur	30
14	(Slovenia) Domen Lorbek	Petrol Olimpija	27
15	(South Sudan) Matur Maker	Zlatorog	34
16	(Croatia) Davor Konjević (4)	Šentjur	32
17	(Slovenia) Žan Mark Šiško (3)	Sixt Primorska	27
18	(Croatia) Davor Konjević (5)	Šentjur	34

==== Second round ====
Week	MVP	Club	Efficiency
1	(Slovenia) Smiljan Pavič	Šenčur	26
2	(Croatia) Marjan Čakarun	Sixt Primorska	26
3	(Serbia) Marko Jagodić-Kuridža	Sixt Primorska	23
4	(Serbia) Ivan Marinković	Sixt Primorska	20
5	(United States) L. D. Williams	Ilirja	49
6 ^{c}	(Slovenia) Nejc Barič	Zlatorog	26
6 ^{c}	(United States) Rashun Davis	Rogaška	26
7	(Croatia) Marjan Čakarun (2)	Sixt Primorska	35
8	(United States) Cleveland Thomas	Zlatorog	30
9	(South Sudan) Matur Maker	Zlatorog	40
10^{c}	(Slovenia) Simo Atanacković	Hopsi Polzela	25
10^{c}	(United States) Donovon Jack	Hopsi Polzela	25

Note

^c – Co-MVP's were announced.

== Statistical leaders ==
=== Performance Index Rating ===
Pos	Player	Club	PIR
1	(Croatia) Davor Konjević	Šentjur	22.37
2	(South Sudan) Matur Maker	Zlatorog	18
3	(United States) L. D. Williams	Ilirja	16.86

=== Points ===
Pos	Player	Club	PPG
1	(Croatia) Davor Konjević	Šentjur	19.96
2	(United States) L. D. Williams	Ilirja	18.43
3	(Slovenia) Blaž Mahkovic	Helios Suns	16.54

=== Rebounds ===
Pos	Player	Club	RPG
1	(South Sudan) Matur Maker	Zlatorog	9.59
2	(Croatia) Davor Konjević	Šentjur	7.96
3	(Slovenia) Dino Murić	Šenčur	6.90

=== Assists ===
Pos	Player	Club	APG
1	(Slovenia) Žan Mark Šiško	Sixt Primorska	6.83
2	(United States) Joshua Heath	Ilirija	6.00
3	(United States) Casey Benson	Hopsi Polzela	5.72

== Clubs in European competitions ==
Team	Competition	Progress
Petrol Olimpija	Champions League	Regular season
