= Lance Harris (basketball) =

American basketball player

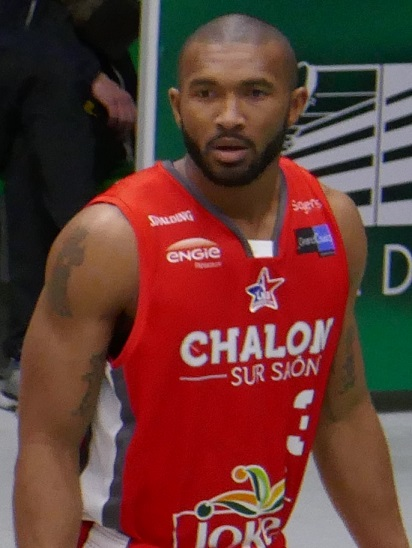

Dubai Basketball
- Title: Assistant coach
- League: ABA League; EuroLeague

Personal information
- Born: November 14, 1984 (age 42) Columbia, Missouri
- Listed height: 6 ft 6 in (1.98 m)
- Listed weight: 210 lb (95 kg)

Career information
- High school: Hickman (Columbia, Missouri)
- College: Kansas State (2003–2007)
- NBA draft: 2007: undrafted
- Playing career: 2007–2019
- Position: Shooting guard

Career history

Playing
- 2007–2008: Zlatorog
- 2008–2010: Kolossos Rodou
- 2010–2011: Igokea
- 2011: Ikaros
- 2011: Reyer Venezia
- 2011–2012: Politekhnika-Halychyna
- 2012–2013: Vanoli Cremona
- 2013–2014: Ural
- 2014–2015: Tofaş
- 2015–2016: Pau-Orthez
- 2016–2018: Élan Chalon
- 2018–2019: Koper Primorska
- 2019: Mornar

Coaching
- 2019–2020: Lindenwood (assistant)
- 2021–2023: Long Island Nets (assistant)
- 2023–2025: Wisconsin Herd (assistant)
- 2025–present: Dubai Basketball (assistant)

Career highlights
- ABA League Top Scorer (2020); Slovenian League champion (2019); ABA League 2 champion (2019); Slovenian Cup winner (2019); French League champion (2017); 2× Greek Dunk champion (2010, 2011)

Lance Harris (born November 14, 1984) is a former American professional basketball player currently working as an assistant coach for Dubai Basketball of the ABA League and the EuroLeague.
