= Nejc Barič =

Slovenian basketball player

No. 9 – Kansai Helios Domžale
- Position: Point guard
- League: Slovenian League; Second ABA League

Personal information
- Born: April 23, 1997 (age 29) Trbovlje, Slovenia
- Listed height: 1.83 m (6 ft 0 in)

Career information
- NBA draft: 2019: undrafted
- Playing career: 2014–present

Career history
- 2014–2019: Zlatorog Laško
- 2019–2020: Koper Primorska
- 2020–2021: Krka
- 2021–2023: Split
- 2023–present: Kansai Helios Domžale

Career highlights
- 2× Slovenian Cup winner (2020, 2021)

Nejc Barič (born April 23, 1997) is a Slovenian professional basketball player for Kansai Helios Domžale of the Slovenian League and the Second ABA League He is a 1.83 m tall point guard.

== Professional career ==
Barič started playing professional basketball for Zlatorog Laško.

In July 2019, Barič signed with Koper Primorska. In July 2020, he signed for Krka. Barič averaged 7.7 points, 4.7 assists, and 2.4 rebounds per game. On August 18, 2021, he signed with Split of the Adriatic League and the Croatian League.

== Personal life ==
His older sister Nika is also a professional basketball player.
