= Nebojša Joksimović (basketball) =

Slovenian basketball player

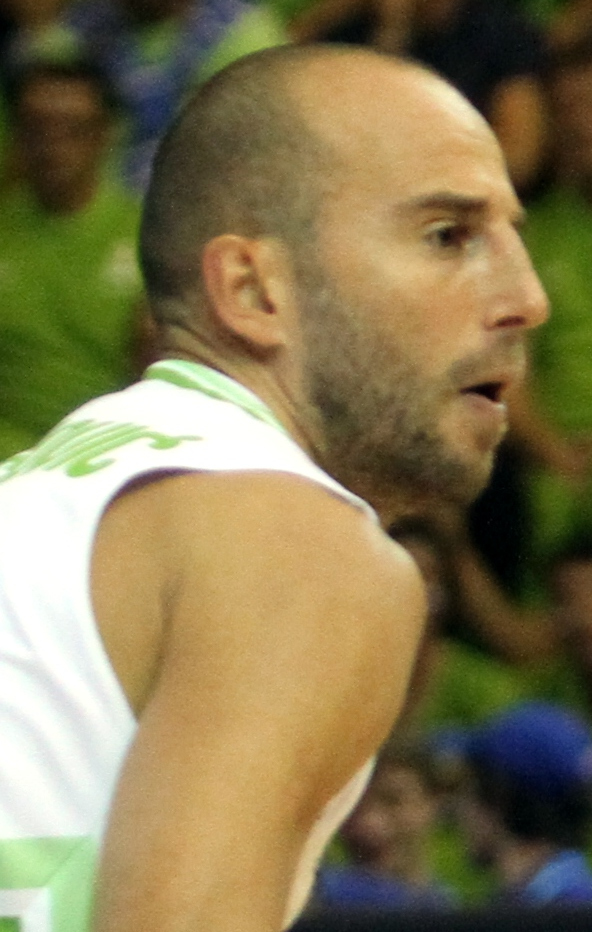
- Joksimović at the EuroBasket 2013

No. 7 – Free agent
- Position: Shooting guard

Personal information
- Born: November 17, 1981 (age 44) Koper, SFR Yugoslavia
- Listed height: 1.93 m (6 ft 4 in)
- Listed weight: 82 kg (181 lb)

Career information
- NBA draft: 2003: undrafted
- Playing career: 2000–present

Career history
- 2000–2003: Koper
- 2003–2005: Pivovarna Laško
- 2005–2009: Hemofarm
- 2009: Lokomotiv-Kuban
- 2010: Scavolini Pesaro
- 2010–2013: Igokea
- 2013–2014: Union Olimpija
- 2014–2015: Krka
- 2015–2017: Cibona
- 2017–2018: Sixt Primorska

Career highlights
- Bosnian League champion (2013); 3× Slovenian Cup winner (2004, 2015, 2018); Bosnian Cup winner (2013)

Nebojša Joksimović (born November 17, 1981) is a Slovenian professional basketball player for Sixt Primorska of the Slovenian League.

== Professional career ==
In August 2013, he signed a one-year deal with Union Olimpija. In July 2014, he signed with another Slovenian team BC Krka. After playing one season for Krka, in October 2015 he moved to the Croatian side Cibona.

In July 2017, he signed with Sixt Primorska.

== Slovenian national team ==
Joksimović played for the Slovenian national team at the 2005 FIBA European Championship, Olympic Qualifying Tournament 2008 and 2013 FIBA European Championship. He also represented Slovenia at the 2015 EuroBasket where they were eliminated by Latvia in eighth finals.

== Personal life ==
Joksimović has Serb ancestry and holds Serbian citizenship besides his native Slovenian.

He is the father of Stefan Joksimović.
