= Marko Jagodić-Kuridža =

Serbian basketball player

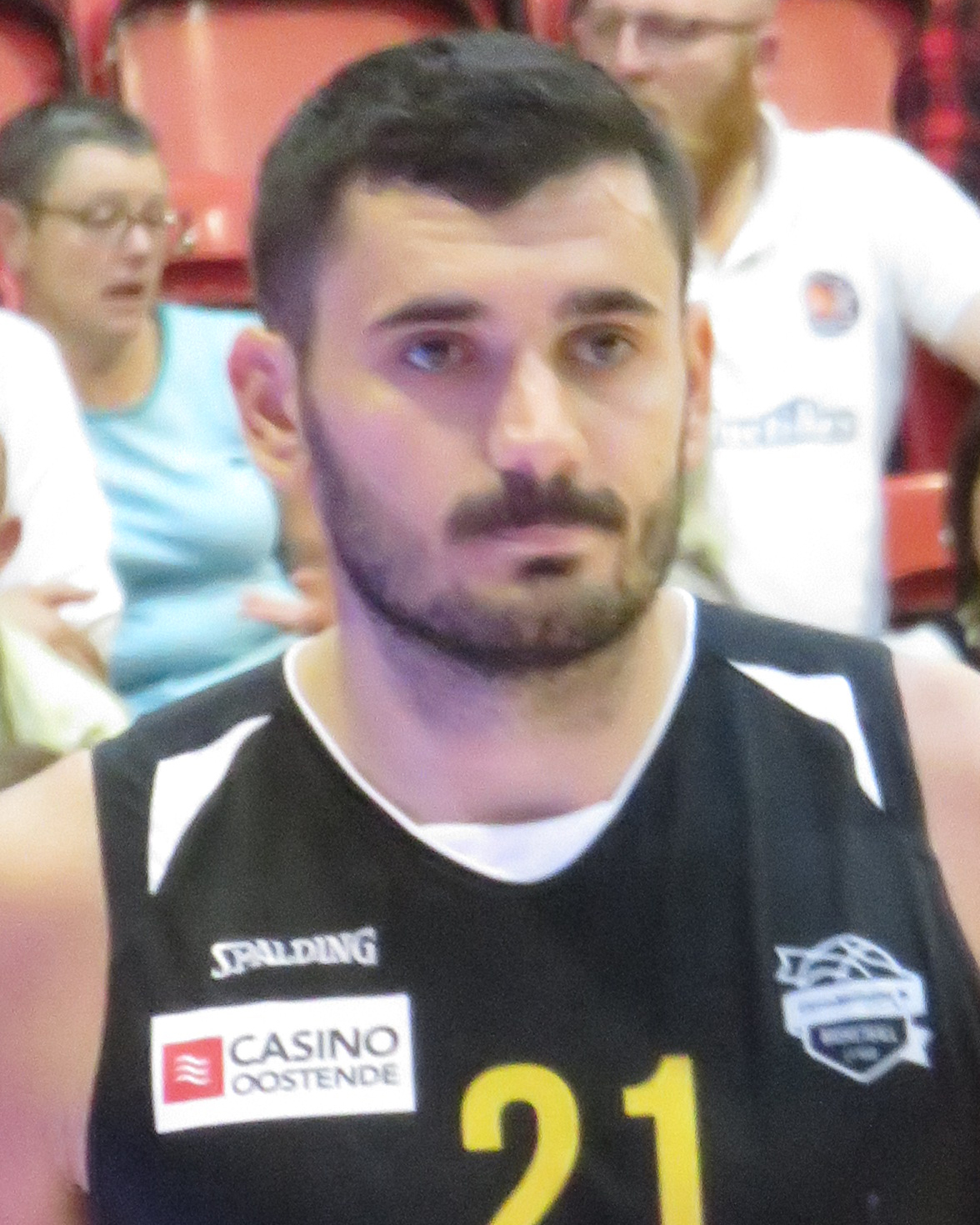
- Jagodić-Kuridža with Oostende in 2016

Personal information
- Born: May 15, 1987 (age 39) Zadar, SR Croatia, SFR Yugoslavia
- Listed height: 2.05 m (6 ft 9 in)
- Listed weight: 104 kg (229 lb)

Career information
- NBA draft: 2009: undrafted
- Playing career: 2005–present
- Position: Power forward

Career history
- 2005–2007: Spartak Subotica
- 2007–2009: Novi Sad
- 2010: Čapljina Lasta
- 2010–2011: Borac Banja Luka
- 2011–2012: Čapljina Lasta
- 2012–2015: Cibona
- 2016: Nymburk
- 2016–2018: Oostende
- 2018–2019: Primorska
- 2019–2021: Crvena zvezda
- 2021–2024: Budućnost
- 2024–present: Vojvodina

Career highlights
- 2× Adriatic League champion (2014, 2021); ABA League Second Division champion (2019); Croatian League champion (2013); Czech League champion (2016); 2× Belgian League champion (2017, 2018); Slovenian League champion (2019); Serbian League champion (2021); 2× Montenegrin League champion (2022, 2023); Croatian Cup winner (2013); 2× Belgian Cup winner (2017, 2018); Slovenian Cup winner (2019); Serbian Cup winner (2021); 2× Montenegrin Cup winner (2022, 2023); 2× Slovenian Supercup winner (2018, 2019); Serbian Cup MVP (2021)

Marko Jagodić-Kuridža (Serbian Cyrillic: Марко Јагодић Куриџа; born May 15, 1987) is a Serbian professional basketball player for KK Vojvodina of the ABA 2 League and the KLS. He also used to represent the senior Serbian national basketball team internationally.

He won national titles with Cibona, Nymburk, Oostende, Primorska, Budućnost and Crvena zvezda as well as two ABA League titles.

== Professional career ==
Jagodić-Kuridža was born in Zadar, present-day Croatia, but grew up in Požega, Serbia. He started his senior career with Spartak Subotica. He then played for Novi Sad of the Basketball League of Serbia. He also played for Borac Banja Luka. While playing with Čapljina Lasta he was named the MVP of the 2011–12 Basketball Championship of Bosnia and Herzegovina.

In July 2012, he signed with Croatian club Cibona. He was the first Serbian basketball player that signed with Cibona after the Yugoslav wars. In his first season with Cibona he won the Croatian League and Cup. In his second year he won the 2013–14 ABA League. On January 1, 2016, after three and a half years in Cibona, he moved to the Czech side ČEZ Nymburk. While playing with Nymburk he won the Czech League. His next club was Oostende where he played two seasons, twice winning the Belgian League and Cup.

On 20 June 2018, he signed for Slovenian team Primorska. While playing with Primorska in the 2018–19 season, Jagodić-Kuridža won the ABA League Second Division as well the all three trophies in Slovenia (League, Cup and Supercup). He also started the 2019–20 season with Primorska, winning the one more Slovenian Supercup. He was named the Finals MVP of the 2018–19 ABA League Second Division.

On 19 December 2019, he left Primorska and signed with Crvena zvezda. In February 2021, he won the Serbian Cup and was also named the Serbian Cup MVP. With Crvena zvezda he also won the ABA League and the Serbian League. On 24 June 2021, he signed a one-year deal with Budućnost. In July 2022, he re-signed with Budućnost for one more season.

== National team career ==
In November 2021, Jagodić-Kuridža made his debut for the Serbian national basketball team during the game vs Latvia in the 2023 FIBA Basketball World Cup qualification. He was on the final roster of Serbia for the EuroBasket 2022.
