= Žan Mark Šiško =

Slovenian basketball player

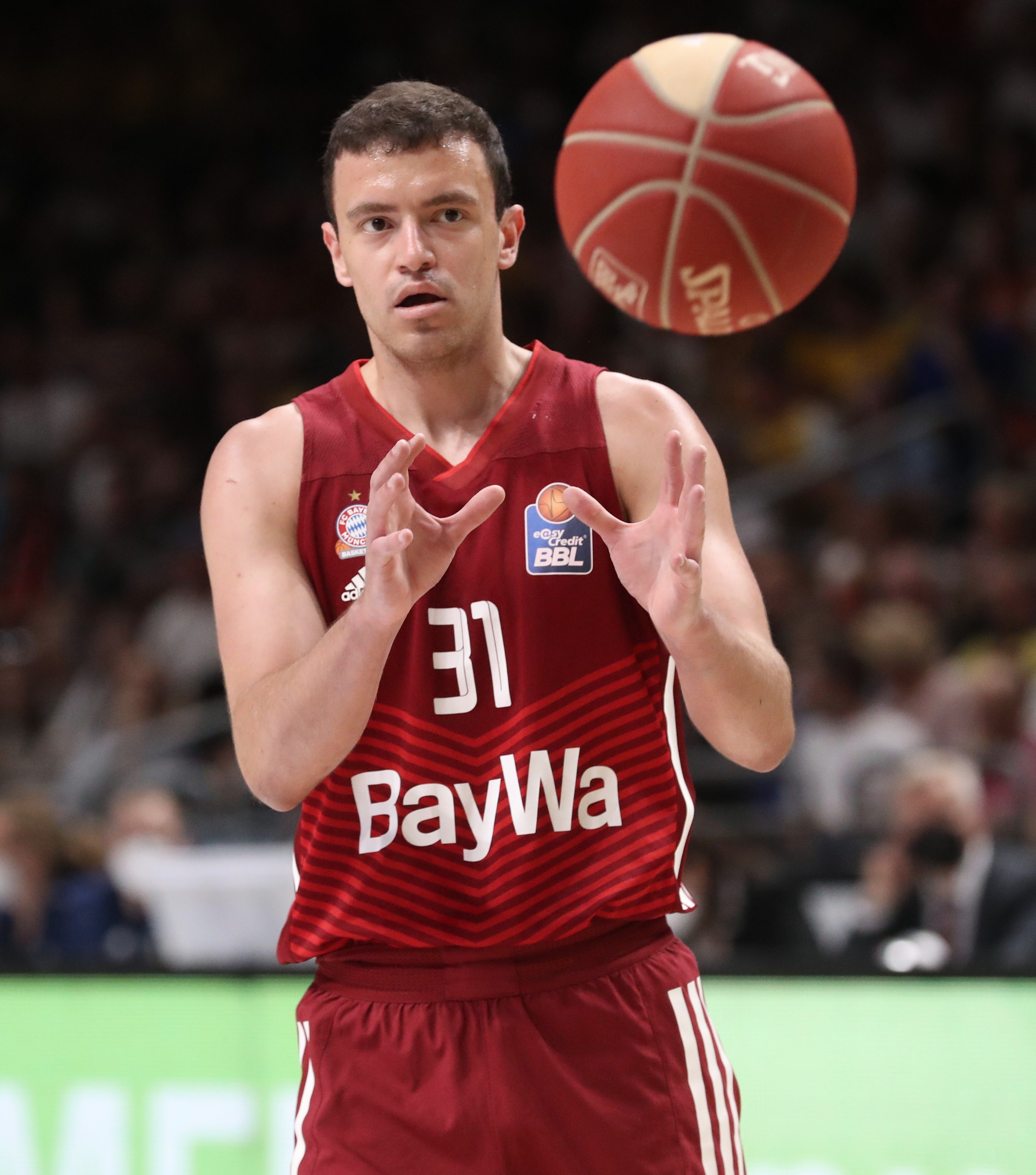
- Šiško with Bayern Munich in 2022

No. 11 – APU Old Wild West Udine
- Position: Point guard
- League: LBA

Personal information
- Born: June 29, 1997 (age 29) Ljubljana, Slovenia
- Listed height: 1.91 m (6 ft 3 in)

Career information
- NBA draft: 2019: undrafted
- Playing career: 2013–2023, 2025–present

Career history
- 2013–2015: Union Olimpija
- 2014–2015: →Škofja Loka
- 2015–2016: Cibona
- 2017–2018: Ilirija
- 2018–2019: Koper Primorska
- 2019–2023: Bayern Munich
- 2023: CB Breogán
- 2025–2026: Cibona
- 2026–present: APU Udine

Career highlights
- ABA League Second Division champion (2019); Slovenian League champion (2019); Croatian League champion (2026); Croatian League assists leader (2026); Slovenian Cup winner (2019); 2× Slovenian Supercup winner (2018, 2019)

Žan Mark Šiško (born June 29, 1997) is a Slovenian professional basketball player for APU Udine of the Lega Basket Serie A (LBA). Standing at 1.91 m (6 ft 3 in), he plays at the point guard position.

== Club career ==
Šiško began his professional career with Slovenian powerhouse Union Olimpija, making his official debut in March 2014 at the age of 16.

During the 2015–16 season, he was part of Croatian team Cibona. On November 1, 2015, Šiško made his ABA League debut in a game against Igokea, finishing the game with 11 points and 3 assists. He saw court during 12 games and averaged 2.9 points and 2 assists.

On December 28, 2019, Šiško signed a contract with German club Bayern Munich.

In July 2022, Šiško extended his contract with Bayern for another two years. In November 2022, he was sidelined from the team for personal reasons for the rest of the season.

On June 21, 2023, Šiško moved to Spanish club CB Breogán.

On August 27, 2025, after 2 years of career break due to personal reasons, Šiško signed with Cibona where he previously played. He led the Croatian League in assists during the 2025–26 season, with 6.7 per game.

On June 29, 2026, Šiško signed with APU Udine of the Italian Lega Basket Serie A (LBA).

== International career ==
On November 24, 2017, Šiško made his debut for the Slovenia national team in the 2019 FIBA Basketball World Cup qualification game against Belarus.
