= Marjan Čakarun =

Croatian basketball player

No. 9 – Cibona
- Position: Center
- League: Favbet Premijer Liga

Personal information
- Born: April 27, 1990 (age 36) Zadar, SR Croatia, SFR Yugoslavia
- Listed height: 2.04 m (6 ft 8 in)
- Listed weight: 103 kg (227 lb)

Career information
- Playing career: 2007–present

Career history
- 2005–2006: Zadar
- 2007–2009: Jazine
- 2009–2012: Borik-Puntamika
- 2012–2013: Jolly
- 2013: Sonik-Puntamika
- 2013–2015: Kvarner 2010
- 2015–2016: Helios Suns
- 2016–2017: Manresa
- 2017–2019: Koper Primorska
- 2019–2022: Szolnoki Olaj KK
- 2022–2023: BC Körmend
- 2024–2025: Kvarner 2010
- 2025: Samobor
- 2025–present: Cibona

Career highlights
- ABA League 2 champion (2019); Stanković Cup (2018); 2× Slovenian League champion (2016, 2019); Croatian League champion (2026); 2× Slovenian Cup winner (2018, 2019); Croatian Second Division (2024); 2× Slovenian League Finals MVP (2016, 2019); Slovenian League MVP (2019); Slovenian Cup MVP (2019)

Marjan Čakarun (born April 27, 1990) is a Croatian professional basketball player for BC Körmend of the Hungarian Basketball League. He is a 2.04 m tall center.

== Career ==
Čakarun signed with Helios Suns in 2015 after playing with Kvarner 2010.

Čakarun signed a two-year contract with Primorska in 2019. He led Primorska to the 2019 Slovenian Cup and was the leading scorer in the final with 32 points.

Čakarun signed two-year contract in July 2023 with then second division Kvarner 2010.
