= Ive Ivanov =

Croatian basketball player (born 1985)

Personal information
- Born: November 13, 1985 (age 41) Zadar, SR Croatia, SFR Yugoslavia
- Listed height: 2.00 m (6 ft 7 in)
- Listed weight: 88 kg (194 lb)

Career information
- NBA draft: 2007: undrafted
- Playing career: 2003–2023
- Position: Power forward

Career history
- 2003–2004: Zadar
- 2004–2007: Borik Puntamika
- 2007–2009: Zabok
- 2009–2010: Borik Puntamika
- 2010–2015: Zadar
- 2015–2016: Krka
- 2016–2017: GKK Šibenik
- 2017–2018: Zadar
- 2018–2019: MZT Skopje
- 2019–2020: Zadar
- 2020–2021: Lions de Genève
- 2021–2023: Široki

Career highlights
- North Macedonia League champion (2019); Slovenian Cup winner (2016); Croatian Cup winner (2020); Swiss Cup winner (2021); SBL Cup winner (2021); SBL Cup MVP (2021)

Ive Ivanov (born November 13, 1985) is a retired Croatian professional basketball player. He played at the power forward position.

== Career ==
Ivanov grew up in Borik Puntamika, but made his pro debut with Zadar in 2003. After the 2003–04 season in which Zadar came second in the Croatian Championship and Cup, Ivanov was passed back to Borik Puntamika. In his first professional season there the club reached the semifinals of the Croatian Cup, even though playing in the second level of the Croatian basketball league. Next season Borik Puntamika reached the top-level league with Ivanov drawing attention to himself and subsequently being called up for the Croatian All-Star game. After spending another season in his youth career club he moved to KK Zabok, another top-level Croatian club. He spent two seasons there and was traded back to Borik Puntamika in 2009. After spending one more season in Borik Puntamika, coach Danijel Jusup returned him to Zadar in the summer of 2010.

He has spent three seasons in KK Zadar since, playing a major role in his club's Croatian League and Adriatic League performances. In the 2010-11 Adriatic league season he averaged 7.3 points, 3.8 reb, 0.9 assists, in the 2012-13 season 5.0 pts, 2.9 reb, 0.7 ass. In the summer of 2013 he decided to sign another one-year contract with Zadar. Despite injuries that forced him to miss a considerable part of the 2013/14 season, he played one of his best games in the last round, when he scored 17 points and made a decisive contribution to his team beating Union Olimpija and keeping its place in the Adriatic League. In August 2014, he extended his contract, making it his fourth season as captain and fifth as a player of KK Zadar.

In July 2015, he signed a two-year contract with the Slovenian club Krka. While playing for Krka he won the Slovenian Cup – his first and only trophy so far. After spending only one season abroad, he followed his coach Vladimir Anzulović from Krka to GKK Šibenik where he signed a two-year contract in July 2016. After one season, he left Šibenik.

On July 25, 2018, Ivanov signed with Macedonian basketball club MZT Skopje.

In July 2019, Ivanov returned to Zadar, signing a one-year deal.

In the 2020 offseason, Ivanov signed with Lions de Genève in Switzerland. He won the Swiss Cup and the SBL Cup with the Lions. In the final of the SBL Cup, Ivanov had 11 points and 8 rebounds and was named the MVP of the competition.

In August 2021, Ivanov signed for Široki of the Championship of Bosnia and Herzegovina and ABA League Second Division. A year later, in August 2022, he signed another one-year deal with Široki.

== Personal life ==
In June 2013 he married his long-time girlfriend Ana with which he had his son Vito a year earlier.
