= Tomaž Berločnik =

Slovenian executive (born 1968)

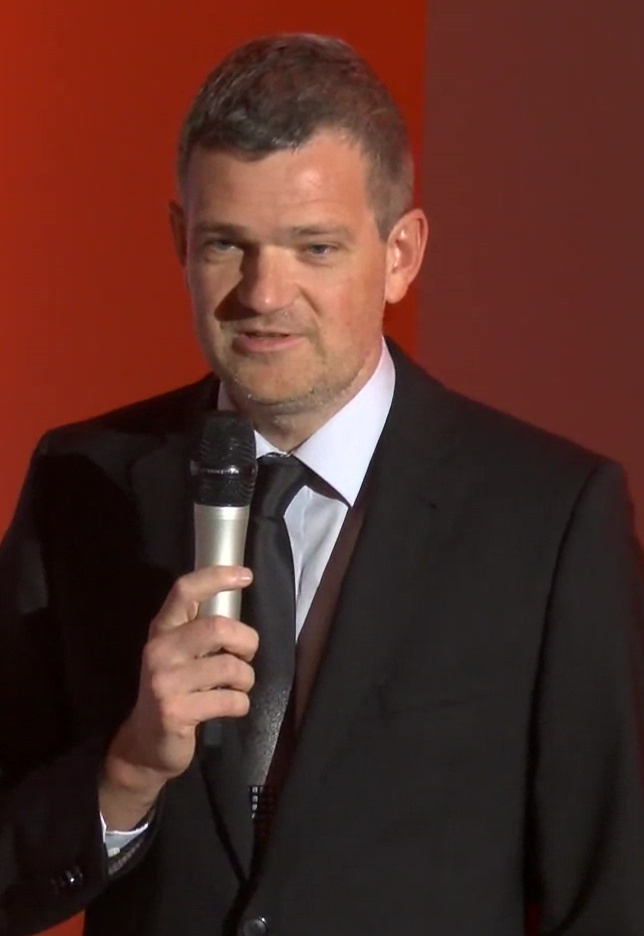
- Tomaž Berločnik
- Born: 1968 (age 57–58)
- Education: University of Ljubljana
- Occupations: business executive; basketball administrator; mechanical engineer

Tomaž Berločnik (born 1968) is a Slovenian business executive, mechanical engineer, and basketball administrator, mainly known as a former CEO of the Slovenian company Petrol Group. Also, he is the president of the men's basketball club Cedevita Olimpija and former president of the basketball club Olimpija Ljubljana.

== Early life and education ==
Berločnik earned his bachelor's degree in mechanical engineering from the University of Ljubljana. At the same university, he earned his master's degree in business administration in 1997.

== Business career ==
After graduation, Berločnik continued his career as a project manager in the companies recovery department of the Slovenian Development Fund.

During the 2000s, Berločnik was a general manager for Slovenian companies Donit Tesnit and Berli. In February 2010, he became the chief executive officer for Istrabenz. He left Instabenz after one year.

On 1 February 2011, Berločnik became the chief executive officer and president of the management board for Petrol Group, the largest Slovenian oil distributing company. In February 2015, he is re-appointed for his second five-year term as the CEO of the company.

Berločnik was a member of the supervisory board for Slovenian companies Elan, Slovenske železnice, Telekom Slovenije, and Petrol.

== Basketball administrator career ==
In July 2017, Berločnik became the president of men's basketball team Olimpija Ljubljana. On 4 June 2019, Berločnik and Croatian businessman Emil Tedeschi announced that Croatian club Cedevita and Olimpija had planned to merge and form a new men's professional basketball club based in Ljubljana. During his tenure as the club's president, Olimpija won the 2017–18 Slovenian League championship.

On 8 July 2019, Berločnik was named the president of newly formed professional basketball club Cedevita Olimpija.

Business positions
Preceded by Aleksander Svetelšek	Chief Executive Officer of Petrol Group; 2011–present	Incumbent
Sporting positions
First	President of KK Cedevita Olimpija; 2019–present	Incumbent
