= Gjorgi Kočov =

Macedonian basketball player and coach

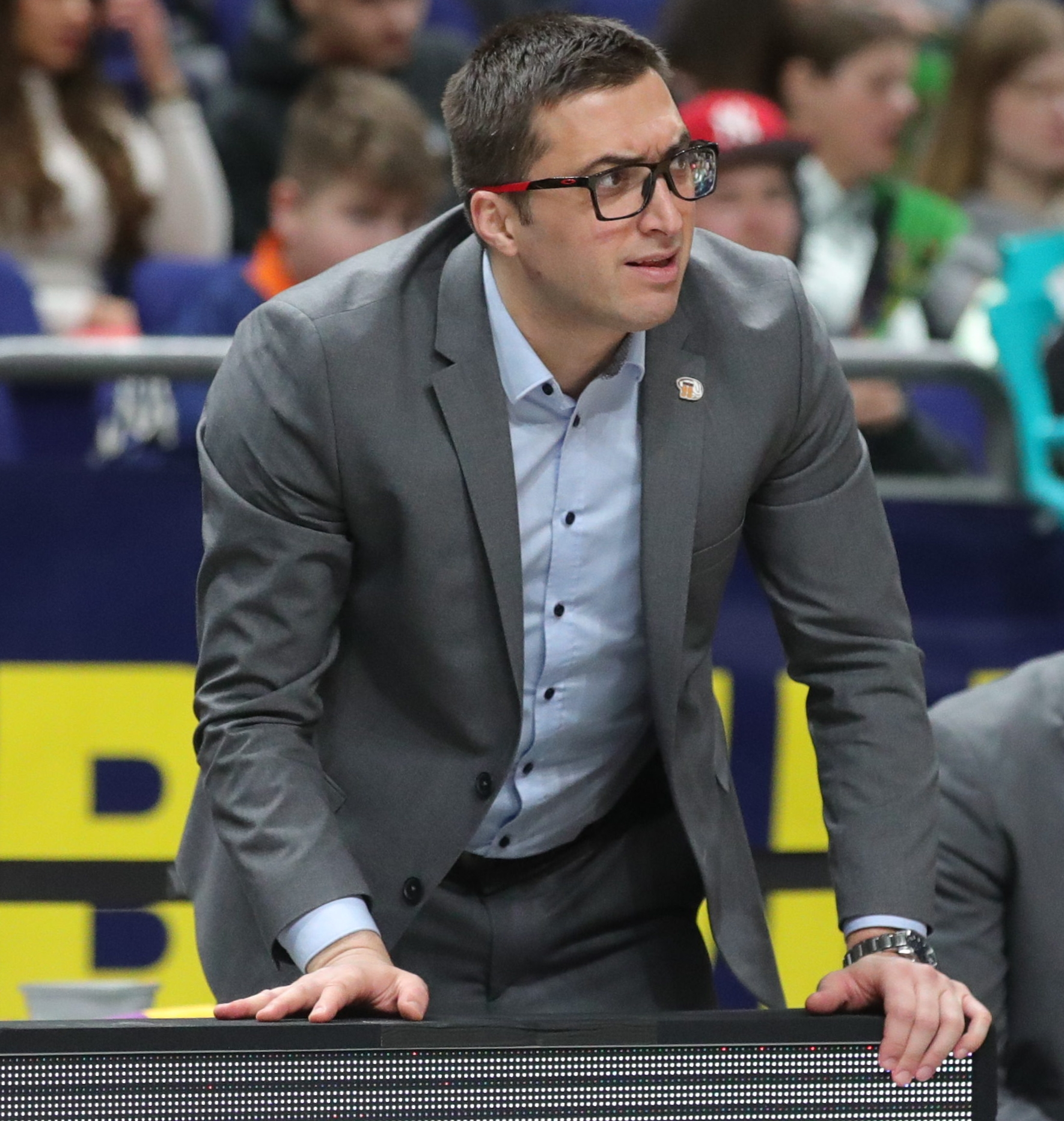
- Kocov in 2022

Niners Chemnitz
- Title: Assistant coach
- League: Basketball Bundesliga; EuroCup

Personal information
- Born: 10 November 1984 (age 42) Skopje, SR Macedonia, SFR Yugoslavia
- Listed height: 1.88 m (6 ft 2 in)
- Listed weight: 92 kg (203 lb)

Career information
- Playing career: 2000–2014
- Position: Point guard

Career history

Playing
- 2000–2008: Rabotnički
- 2008–2010: Vardar
- 2010–2012: MZT Skopje
- 2012–2014: Vardar

Coaching
- 2016–2017: Vardar
- 2017–2018: MZT Skopje (assistant)
- 2018–2021: MZT Skopje
- 2019–2021: North Macedonia (assistant)
- 2021–present: Niners Chemnitz (assistant)

Career highlights
- As player: 7× Macedonian League champion (2001–2006, 2012); 5× Macedonian Cup winner (2003–2006, 2012); As head coach: Macedonian League champion (2019); ABA League Second Division runner-up (2019); Coach of the Year (2019); As assistant coach: FIBA Europe Cup champion (2024)

Gjorgi Kočov (Macedonian: Ѓорѓи Кочов; born 10 November 1984) is a Macedonian professional basketball coach and former player. He currently serves as an assistant coach for Niners Chemnitz of the German Basketball Bundesliga (BBL) and the EuroCup.

== Playing career ==
Kočov started his professional playing career with KK Rabotnički and later played for other Macedonian teams.

== Coaching career ==
Kočov is a graduated basketball coach earning his degree at the Faculty of Physical Education, Sport and Health on Ss. Cyril and Methodius University in Skopje.

In 2014, he started his coaching career as a head coach for Vardar U-18 and U-20 teams with whom in two seasons he won three gold medals.

In 2016, he was named an assistant coach for the Macedonia national under-16 team. On 27 September 2016, Kočov became the head coach of Vardar. In 2016, Kočov was selected for the best coach in junior competition.

In 2017, he was named the head coach of the Macedonia national under-18 team. On 19 December 2017, he became the assistant coach to Željko Lukajić in MZT Skopje that played in the ABA League.

On 3 April 2018, he became the head coach of MZT Skopje. In 2019, he won the Macedonian League and led the team to the final in the ABA League Second Division. In March 2021, he parted ways with MZT Skopje.
