= Zoran Glomazić =

Montenegrin basketball coach

KK Milenijum
- Position: Head coach

Personal information
- Born: June 12, 1963 (age 63) Nikšić, SR Montenegro, SFR Yugoslavia
- Coaching career: 1992–present

Career history

Coaching
- 1992–1993: Alema Nikšić (women's team)
- 2000–2001: Mlagost Gacko
- 2002–2003: Ibon Nikšić
- 2005–2006: Rudar Ugljevik
- 2006–2007: Nikšić
- 2007–2008: Mogren Budva
- 2008–2009: Primorje-Mediteran Herceg Novi
- 2009–2012: HEO
- 2012–2016: Zrinjski
- 2016–2017: Teuta Durrës
- 2017–2018: Teodo Tivat
- 2018–2020: Sutjeska
- 2020–2021: Zrinjski
- 2021–present: Milenijum

Zoran Glomazić (born June 12, 1963) is a Montenegrin basketball coach who serves as a head coach for the KK Milenijum of the Montenegrin Basketball League.

== Coaching career ==
On August 28, 2017, Glomazić became a head coach for the Montenegrin team Teodo Tivat. On February 4, 2018, he terminated contract with Teodo by mutual agreement. On March 28, 2018, he was named a head coach for Sutjeska. He left Sutjeska in July 2020.

He then served as head coach of Zrinjski Mostar, and from November 2021, he is head coach of KK Milenijum of Montenegrin Basketball League.
