= Danijel Jusup =

Croatian professional basketball coach (born 1961)

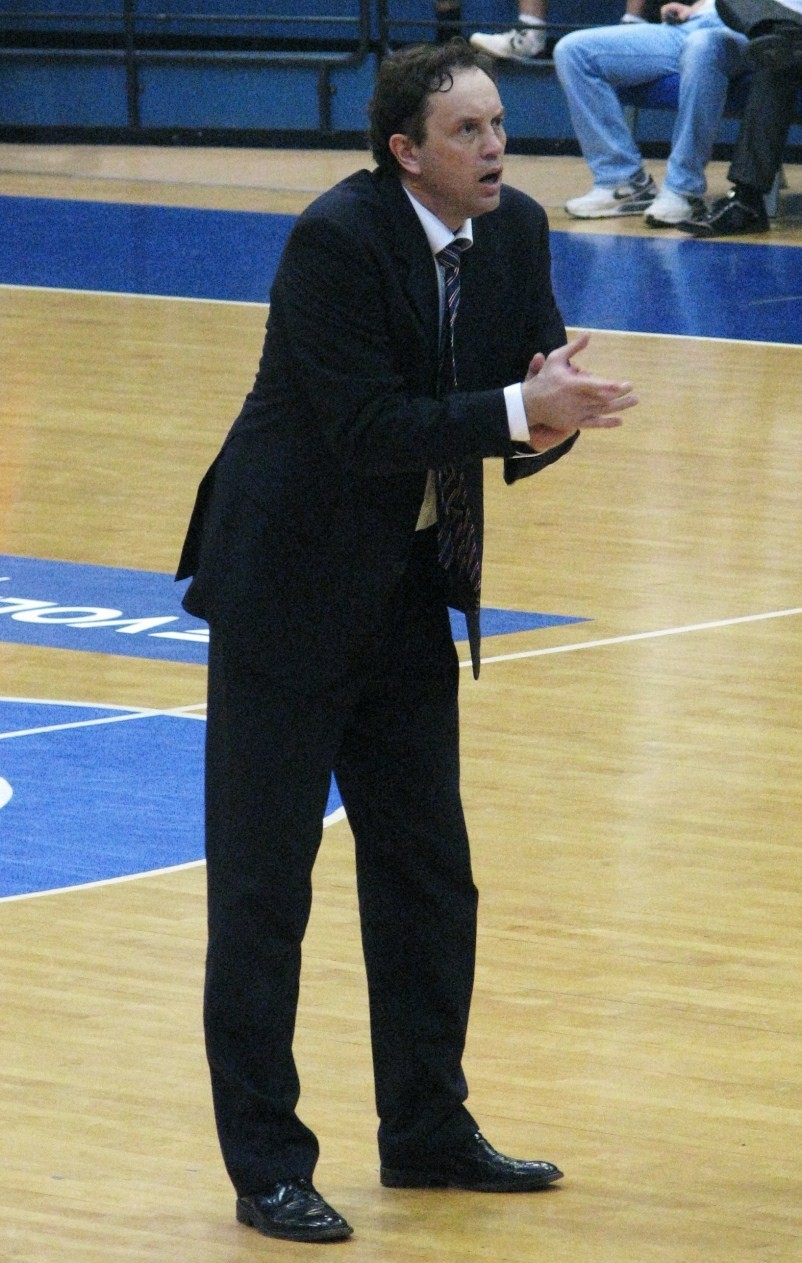
- Jusup coaching Zadar in 2010

Personal information
- Born: 8 September 1961 (age 65) Zadar, PR Croatia, FPR Yugoslavia
- Position: Head coach
- Coaching career: 1992–present

Career history

Coaching
- 1992–1993: Zadar
- 1993–1996: Benston Zagreb
- 1996–1999: Zadar
- 2001: Široki
- 2000–2002: Anwil Włocławek
- 2002–2004: Zadar
- 2004–2005: Split
- 2005: Telekom Baskets Bonn
- 2007–2008: Zagreb
- 2008–2009: Lokomotiv Rostov
- 2010: Široki Eronet
- 2010–2011: Zadar
- 2012–2017: Zagreb
- 2018–2019: Široki
- 2019–2020: Zadar
- 2021–2022: Široki
- 2022–2026: Zadar

Career highlights
- ABA League champion (2003); Bosnian League champion (2019); 3× Croatian League champion (2023–2025); 4× Croatian Cup winner (1998, 2003, 2020, 2024); 2× Croatian Coach of the Year (1998, 2003); ABA League Coach of the Season (2024)

Danijel Jusup (born 8 September 1961) is a Croatian professional basketball coach who was most recently the head coach for Zadar of the ABA League and the Croatian League.

== Coaching career ==
Jusup started his sporting career with Zadar, first as a player, later as a coach. In 1992, at age of 31, he became the head coach for Zadar that played in the Croatian League and the EuroLeague. Altogether, he spent eight years in his hometown club during which he won three Croatian Cups, the Adriatic League and played the finals of the Croatian League three times. Aside from Zadar and Zagreb, Jusup coached Benston Zagreb and Split of the Croatian League, and was named Croatian Coach of the Year twice.

His first international position was the head coach of the Polish First Division club Anwil Wloclawek with which Jusup took part in the Saporta Cup. He also participated in another European second-tier competition, ULEB Cup, with Zadar.

In July 2005, Jusup signed with the German club Telekom Baskets Bonn, but after only six months terminated the contract. During the 2008–09 season he led the Russian Lokomotiv Rostov.

In January 2010, Jusup led Bosnian team Široki Eronet for only one week before returning to Zadar for the fourth time. In the summer of 2012, Jusup signed for Zagreb for the second time. Five days before the start of the 2017–18 season, he left Zagreb.

In April 2018, Jusup signed with Široki of the Bosnian League for the third time in his coaching career.

On 23 October 2019, Jusup was named the head coach for Zadar. He debuted for the fifth time in his coaching career as Zadar coach on 25 October 2019, in the 78–82 loss to Cibona, in the ABA League. In February 2020, Jusup celebrated winning the Krešimir Ćosić Cup for the 2019–20 season. On 24 June 2020, Zadar terminated the contract with Jusup.

On 7 July 2022, Zadar hired Jusup as their new head coach, for the sixth time.
