= Jovan Beader =

Serbian basketball coach

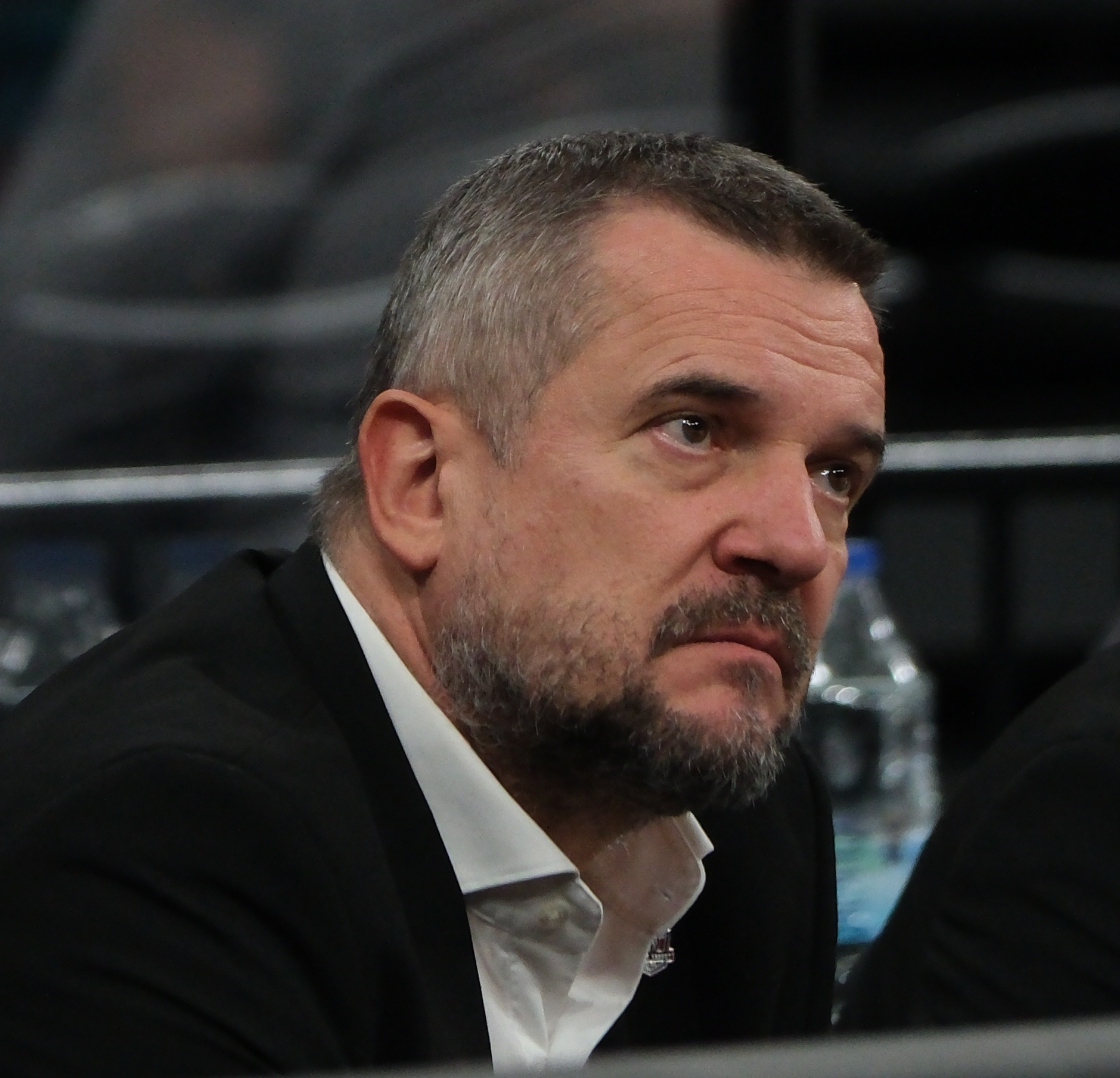

Glint Manisa Basket
- Position: Assistant coach
- League: BSL

Personal information
- Born: June 12, 1970 (age 56) Belgrade, SR Serbia, SFR Yugoslavia
- Coaching career: 2007–present

Career history

Coaching
- 2007–2008: Ryazan
- 2010–2014: Nizhny Novgorod (assistant)
- 2014–2015: Banvit (assistant)
- 2015–2016: Al Kuwait SC (head coach)
- 2017–2018: Helios Suns
- 2019–2020: Koper Primorska (youth)
- 2021–2023: Lokomotiv Kuban (assistant)
- 2023- present: Dynamic Belgrade (assistant, coach for U19)
- 2025–present: Manisa Basket (assistant)

Jovan Beader (Serbian Cyrillic: Јован Беадер; born June 12, 1970) is a Serbian professional basketball coach who is an assistant coach for Manisa Basket of the Basketbol Süper Ligi (BSL).

== Coaching career ==
Beader was an assistant for Nizhny Novgorod (Russia) and Banvit (Turkey) while the head coach was Zoran Lukić.

On May 8, 2017, Beader was named as a head coach for Sloveanian team Helios Suns. On November 12, 2018, he was sacked due to bad results.

In February 2021, he became an assistant coach of Lokomotiv Kuban under Evgeniy Pashutin.
