= James Woodard =

American basketball player (born 1994)

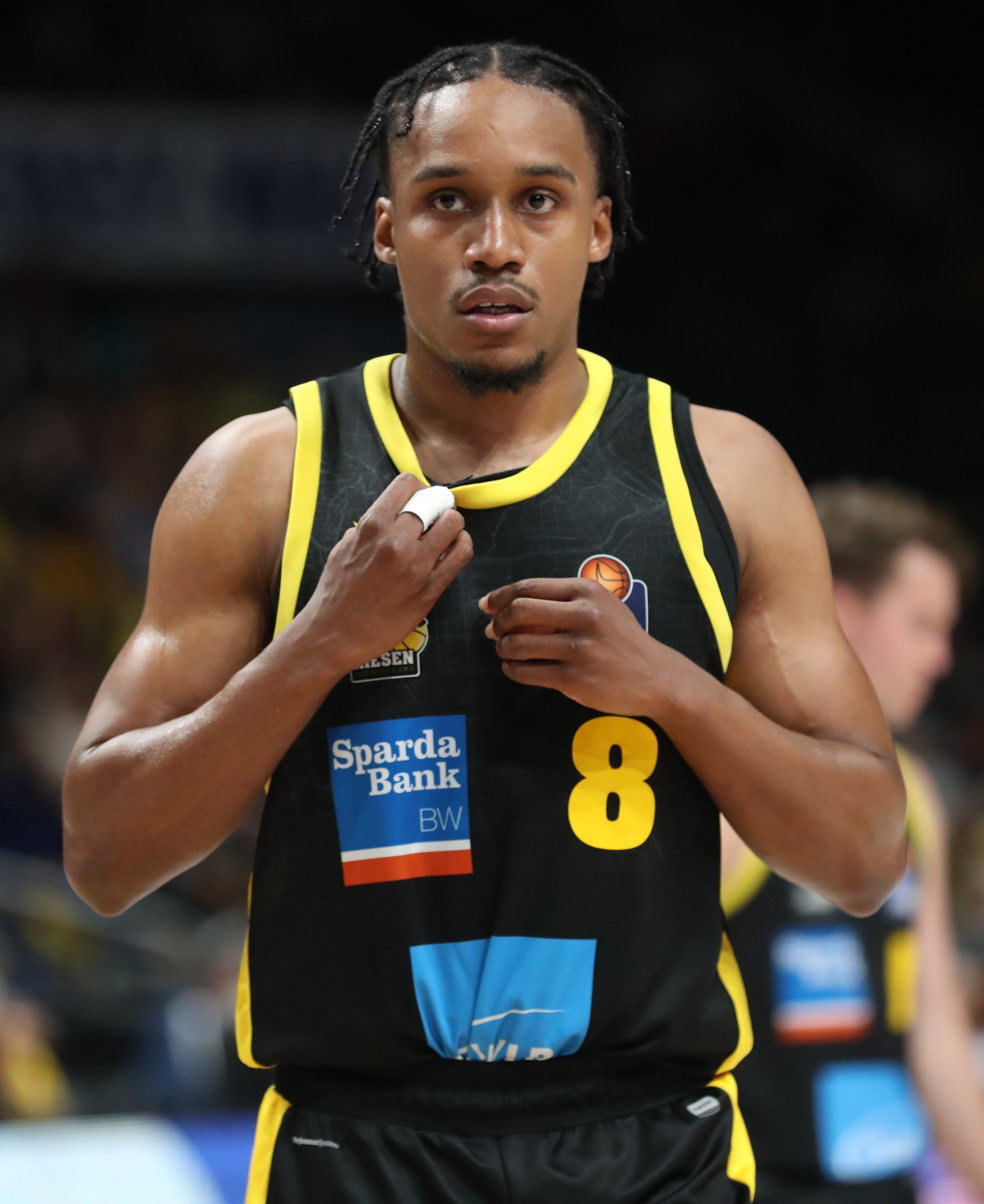
- Woodard playing for Ludwigsburg in 2022

No. 10 – FC Porto
- Position: Shooting guard
- League: Liga Betclic

Personal information
- Born: January 24, 1994 (age 32) Arcadia, Oklahoma, U.S.
- Listed height: 1.91 m (6 ft 3 in)
- Listed weight: 83 kg (183 lb)

Career information
- High school: Edmond Memorial (Edmond, Oklahoma)
- College: Tulsa (2012–2016)
- NBA draft: 2016: undrafted
- Playing career: 2016–present

Career history
- 2016–2017: Rouen Métropole
- 2017–2018: Nevėžis Kedainiai
- 2018–2019: MZT Skopje
- 2019–2020: Medi Bayreuth
- 2020–2021: Pallacanestro Cantù
- 2021: Peristeri
- 2021–2022: Riesen Ludwigsburg
- 2022–2023: Hamburg Towers
- 2023: Esenler Erokspor
- 2023–2024: Darüşşafaka
- 2024–2025: King Szczecin
- 2025–2026: EWE Baskets Oldenburg
- 2026–present: FC Porto

Career highlights
- North Macedonia League champion (2019); Portuguese Super Cup winner (2026); 2× First-team All-AAC (2015, 2016); Second-team All-Conference USA (2014)

James Alexander Woodard (born January 24, 1994) is an American professional basketball player for Porto in the Liga Betclic. He played college basketball at Tulsa from 2012 to 2016.

== College career ==
As a senior at Tulsa in 2015–16, Woodard averaged 15.3 points, 5.2 rebounds and 2.3 assists in 34.1 minutes in 31 appearances. He was named to the First Team All-American Athletic Conference. On November 14, 2015, he scored 23 points and 4 rebounds in an 81–98 win over Central Arkansas Bears.

== Professional career ==
After graduating, on July 8, 2016, Woodard signed with Rouen Métropole of LNB Pro B. On his debut for Rouen Metropole he scored 18 points and 5 rebounds in 76–70 home win against JA Vichy-Clermont Métropole. On August 28, 2017, he signed with Lithuanian basketball club Nevėžis Kėdainiai. On July 27, 2018, he signed with Macedonian basketball club MZT Skopje. On his debut for MZT Skopje on September 27, 2018, he scored 19 points and 4 assists in a 92–79 home win against Helios Suns He was named for MVP of the first round after this game. On June 16, 2019, he signed with Medi Bayreuth.

On July 16, 2020, he has signed with Pallacanestro Cantù of the LBA.

On January 17, 2021, he signed with Peristeri of the Greek Basket League. He averaged 7.3 points, 2.1 rebounds, and 1.4 assists per game.

On July 20, 2021, Woodard signed with MHP Riesen Ludwigsburg of the German Basketball Bundesliga. MHP Riesen Ludwigsburg also plays in the Basketball Champions League.

He signed with Hamburg Towers of the Bundesliga on July 28, 2022.

On December 27, 2023, he signed with Darüşşafaka of the Basketbol Süper Ligi (BSL).

On September 19, 2025, he signed with EWE Baskets Oldenburg in the Basketball Bundesliga (BBL).

== Personal life ==
He is the son of Marcus and Petra Woodard. His brother Jordan played basketball for Oklahoma and professionally.
