= VOLI =

Montenegrin retailer

Voli Trade DOO
- Official logo
- Type: LLC
- Industry: Retail
- Founded: 1995; 31 years ago
- Headquarters: Josipa Broza bb, Podgorica, Montenegro
- Number of locations: 64 (2018)
- Key people: Dragan Bokan (CEO, owner)
- Services: Supermarkets, convenience stores, wholesale, BMW & MINI cars dealer
- Revenue: ▲€368.92 million (2024)
- Net income: ▲€16.33 million (2024)
- Total assets: ▲€133.70 million (2024)
- Total equity: ▲€74.94 million (2024)
- Number of employees: 2,367 (2024)
- Website: kompanija.voli.me

VOLI (full legal name: Voli Trade DOO) is a Montenegrin retailer, with primary activity in operation of supermarkets. With over 2,300 employees, it is the second largest employer in Montenegro.

== Overview ==
The company was founded in 1995, and begun its operations with a single supermarket in Blok 5 neighbourhood of Podgorica. The company has been expanding its retail network ever since, and as of 2012, its food retail market share in Montenegro stands at around 25%.

Its retail network consists of 60 outlets throughout Montenegro, with concepts ranging from convenience stores to a company owned shopping mall, with VOLI hypermarket as anchor tenant. VOLI is also official distributor for Montentegro for several popular regional food brands, such as Carnex, Vital and Vindija.

In addition to its retail business, in 2011 VOLI became authorised dealer for BMW and Mini carmakers for Montenegro.

== Social responsibility ==
In 2011, the company became the general sponsor of KK Budućnost Podgorica, the country's most successful basketball club. The club was renamed KK Budućnost VOLI, and the company's CEO, Dragan Bokan, has become the club's president.

== See also ==
- List of supermarket chains in Montenegro
