= Blaž Mahkovic =

Slovenian basketball player

No. 21 – Krka
- Position: Small forward / power forward
- League: 1. SKL; ABA League

Personal information
- Born: 21 March 1990 (age 36) Kranj, SFR Yugoslavia
- Listed height: 2.01 m (6 ft 7 in)
- Listed weight: 90 kg (198 lb)

Career information
- NBA draft: 2012: undrafted
- Playing career: 2006–present

Career history
- 2006–2009: Triglav Kranj
- 2009–2012: LTHcast Mercator
- 2012–2014: Helios Domžale
- 2014–2016: Union Olimpija
- 2016–2017: Igokea
- 2017–2018: Helios Suns
- 2018: Krka
- 2018–2026: Helios Suns
- 2026–present: Krka

Career highlights
- Bosnian League champion (2017); Bosnian Cup winner (2017); Slovenian Supercup winner (2026)

Blaž Mahkovic (born 21 March 1990) is a Slovenian professional basketball player for Krka of the Slovenian League (1. SKL) and the ABA League. He is a 2.01 m tall forward.

== International career ==
Mahkovic made his debut for the Slovenian national team on 24 November 2017 at the 2019 FIBA Basketball World Cup qualification game against Belarus national team.
