= Slovenian Basketball Cup =

Sports competition in Slovenia

- Sport: Basketball
- Founded: 1991
- Country: Slovenia
- Continent: Europe
- Most recent champion: Cedevita Olimpija (25th title)
- Most titles: Cedevita Olimpija (25 titles)
- Related competitions: Slovenian Basketball League; Slovenian Supercup
- Website: Official website

The Slovenian Basketball Cup is an annual knockout basketball competition between the clubs from Slovenia. It is currently named Pokal Spar due to sponsorship reasons.

== Title holders ==
- 1991–92 Smelt Olimpija
- 1992–93 Smelt Olimpija
- 1993–94 Smelt Olimpija
- 1994–95 Smelt Olimpija
- 1995–96 Kovinotehna Savinjska Polzela
- 1996–97 Smelt Olimpija
- 1997–98 Union Olimpija
- 1998–99 Union Olimpija
- 1999–00 Union Olimpija
- 2000–01 Union Olimpija
- 2001–02 Union Olimpija
- 2002–03 Union Olimpija
- 2003–04 Pivovarna Laško
- 2004–05 Union Olimpija
- 2005–06 Union Olimpija
- 2006–07 Helios Domžale
- 2007–08 Union Olimpija
- 2008–09 Union Olimpija
- 2009–10 Union Olimpija
- 2010–11 Union Olimpija
- 2011–12 Union Olimpija
- 2012–13 Union Olimpija
- 2013–14 Krka
- 2014–15 Krka
- 2015–16 Krka
- 2016–17 Union Olimpija
- 2017–18 Sixt Primorska
- 2018–19 Sixt Primorska
- 2019–20 Koper Primorska
- 2020–21 Krka
- 2021–22 Cedevita Olimpija
- 2022–23 Cedevita Olimpija
- 2023–24 Cedevita Olimpija
- 2024–25 Cedevita Olimpija
- 2025–26 Cedevita Olimpija

== List of finals ==
| Year | Location | Winners | Runners-up | Score | Most valuable player |
|---|---|---|---|---|---|
| 1992 | Škofja Loka | Smelt Olimpija | Tinex Medvode | 108–50 | —N/a |
| 1993 | Postojna | Smelt Olimpija | Optimizem Postojna | 78–77 | —N/a |
| 1994 | Polzela | Smelt Olimpija | Kovinotehna Savinjska | 84–74 | —N/a |
| 1995 | Radenci | Smelt Olimpija | Postojna | 97–77 | (Slovenia) Dušan Hauptman |
| 1996 | Maribor | Kovinotehna Savinjska | BWC Maribor | 94–84 | (Slovenia) Klemen Zaletel |
| 1997 | Polzela | Smelt Olimpija | Kovinotehna Savinjska | 72–60 | —N/a |
| 1998 | Novo Mesto | Union Olimpija | Pivovarna Laško | 101–93 | (United States) Ariel McDonald |
| 1999 | Ljubljana | Union Olimpija | Pivovarna Laško | 73–70 | (Slovenia) Ivica Jurković |
| 2000 | Laško | Union Olimpija | Pivovarna Laško | 71–70 | (Lithuania) Šarūnas Jasikevičius |
| 2001 | Zagorje | Union Olimpija | Krka Telekom | 73–69 | (Croatia) Emilio Kovačić |
| 2002 | Ljubljana | Union Olimpija | Krka | 79–60 | (Czech Republic) Jiří Welsch |
| 2003 | Domžale | Union Olimpija | Geoplin Slovan | 86–72 | —N/a |
| 2004 | Maribor | Pivovarna Laško | Union Olimpija | 82–79 | (Slovenia) Nebojša Joksimović |
| 2005 | Škofja Loka | Union Olimpija | Pivovarna Laško | 107–69 | (Slovenia) Sašo Ožbolt |
| 2006 | Domžale | Union Olimpija | Pivovarna Laško | 78–71 | (Slovenia) Tadej Koštomaj |
| 2007 | Ljubljana | Helios Domžale | Union Olimpija | 77–70 | (Croatia) Robert Troha |
| 2008 | Ljubljana | Union Olimpija | Helios Domžale | 85–66 | (Bosnia and Herzegovina) Jasmin Hukić |
| 2009 | Laško | Union Olimpija | Elektra Esotech | 75–58 | (Bosnia and Herzegovina) Jasmin Hukić |
| 2010 | Novo Mesto | Union Olimpija | Zlatorog Laško | 84–68 | (Slovenia) Gašper Vidmar |
| 2011 | Škofja Loka | Union Olimpija | Helios Domžale | 92–55 | (Slovenia) Sašo Ožbolt |
| 2012 | Brežice | Union Olimpija | Krka | 68–63 | (United States) Deon Thompson |
| 2013 | Celje | Union Olimpija | Helios Domžale | 73–61 | (Slovenia) Dino Murić |
| 2014 | Maribor | Krka | Union Olimpija | 83–70 | (Slovenia) Sani Bečirović |
| 2015 | Laško | Krka | Zlatorog Laško | 77–67 | (United States) Chris Booker |
| 2016 | Ljubljana | Krka | Lastovka | 66–33 | (Slovenia) Luka Lapornik |
| 2017 | Domžale | Union Olimpija | Krka | 86–81 | (Serbia) Nikola Janković |
| 2018 | Ljubljana | Sixt Primorska | Šenčur GGD | 83–63 | (Slovenia) Matic Rebec |
| 2019 | Koper | Sixt Primorska | Hopsi Polzela | 91–72 | (Croatia) Marjan Čakarun |
| 2020 | Ljubljana | Koper Primorska | Cedevita Olimpija | 93–84 | (Bosnia and Herzegovina) Aleksandar Lazić |
| 2021 | Ljubljana | Krka | Šentjur | 72–66 | (Slovenia) Luka Lapornik |
| 2022 | Ljubljana | Cedevita Olimpija | Helios Suns | 99–80 | (Slovenia) Edo Murić |
| 2023 | Maribor | Cedevita Olimpija | Helios Suns | 81–70 | (Slovenia) Alen Omić |
| 2024 | Ljubljana | Cedevita Olimpija | Krka | 87–86 | (Slovenia) Alen Omić |
| 2025 | Ljubljana | Cedevita Olimpija | Krka | 102–71 | (Slovenia) Bine Prepelič |
| 2026 | Šenčur | Cedevita Olimpija | Krka | 99–78 | (United States) Umoja Gibson |

Source: Basketball Federation of Slovenia

== Performance by club ==
| Club | Titles | Runners-up | Years won | Years runners-up |
|---|---|---|---|---|
| Cedevita Olimpija (Note: Including inherited titles of KK Olimpija.) | 25 | 4 | 1992, 1993, 1994, 1995, 1997, 1998, 1999, 2000, 2001, 2002, 2003, 2005, 2006, 2008, 2009, 2010, 2011, 2012, 2013, 2017, 2022, 2023, 2024, 2025, 2026 | 2004, 2007, 2014, 2020 |
| Krka | 4 | 7 | 2014, 2015, 2016, 2021 | 2001, 2002, 2012, 2017, 2024, 2025, 2026 |
| Koper Primorska | 3 | 0 | 2018, 2019, 2020 | |
| Zlatorog Laško | 1 | 7 | 2004 | 1998, 1999, 2000, 2005, 2006, 2010, 2015 |
| Kansai Helios Domžale | 1 | 5 | 2007 | 2008, 2011, 2013, 2022, 2023 |
| Hopsi Polzela | 1 | 3 | 1996 | 1994, 1997, 2019 |
| Postojna | 0 | 2 | | 1993, 1995 |
| Tinex Medvode | 0 | 1 | | 1992 |
| BWC Maribor | 0 | 1 | | 1996 |
| Slovan | 0 | 1 | | 2003 |
| Elektra | 0 | 1 | | 2009 |
| Lastovka | 0 | 1 | | 2016 |
| Šenčur | 0 | 1 | | 2018 |
| Šentjur | 0 | 1 | | 2021 |

== See also ==
- Slovenian Basketball League
- Slovenian Basketball Supercup
