= KK Koper Primorska =

Defunct basketball club in Koper, Slovenia

Koper Primorska
- Nickname: Tigri (The Tigers)
- Leagues: Slovenian League
- Founded: 2016; 9 years ago
- Folded: December 2020; 4 years ago
- History: KK Sixt Primorska; 2016–2019; KK Koper Primorska; 2019–2020
- Arena: Arena Bonifika
- Capacity: 3,000
- Location: Koper, Slovenia
- Team colors: Yellow, blue
- Championships: 1 Slovenian League; 3 Slovenian Cups; 2 Slovenian Supercups; 1 ABA Second Division

Košarkarski klub Koper Primorska (English: Koper Primorska Basketball Club), commonly referred to as KK Koper Primorska, was a men's professional basketball club based in Koper, Slovenia. The club was formed by the merger of KOŠ Koper and KK Lastovka in 2016, and was disbanded in 2020 due to financial problems.

Primorska became the Slovenian champions in 2019, and also won the Slovenian Cup three times in a row between 2018 and 2020.

== History ==
KK Primorska was founded in 2016 by the merger of KK Lastovka and ŠD Koš Koper. The team finished in seventh place in its debut season in the Slovenian national league.

In its second season, Sixt Primorska competed in the second-level regional league, ABA League Second Division, where they lost in the final against KK Krka. During the 2018–19 season, Sixt Primorska won a historic "quadruple" after winning in all four competitions in which they played (national league, domestic cup, domestic supercup, and ABA League Second Division). As a result, they earned a place in the ABA League First Division for the 2019–20 season. Before the 2019–20 season, the club changed its name to Koper Primorska.

In December 2019 it was reported that the club became financially unstable, and that several players, including head coach Jurica Golemac, have left the club. Despite this, the club still managed to win their third consecutive domestic cup title in February 2020 with a win over Cedevita Olimpija. After the season, which ended early because of the COVID-19 pandemic, the club did not obtain a licence for the national top division, issued by the Basketball Federation of Slovenia. However, in late June 2020, the licence was granted after a successful appeal.

On 7 September 2020, Primorska withdrew from the 2020 Slovenian Supercup due to roster problems. In the same month, the club reportedly withdrew from the ABA League due to serious financial difficulties. On 14 September, however, the club officially announced that they had found new partners and would play in the ABA League and the Slovenian top division.

In November 2020, the club became a shareholder of the Adriatic Basketball Association, following a transfer of shares from MZT Skopje. However, in December 2020, Primorska was disqualified from the ABA League after failing to play two consecutive games due to financial problems. Later that month, the club also withdrew from the national league and was disbanded.

== Season-by-season records ==
Season	Tier	League	Pos.	Domestic cup	ABA League		Other competitions	
2016–17	1	1. SKL	7th	Quarterfinals	—		Alpe Adria Cup	QF
2017–18	1	1. SKL	3rd	Winners	Second Division	RU	—	
2018–19	1	1. SKL	1st	Winners	Second Division	W	Slovenian Supercup	W
2019–20	1	1. SKL	Cn.	Winners	First Division	Cn.	Slovenian Supercup	W
2019–20	1	1. SKL	Cn.	Winners	First Division	Cn.	ABA Supercup	SF
2020–21	1	1. SKL	Withdrew		First Division	DQ	—	

== Head coaches ==
- (Slovenia) Aleksander Sekulić, 2016–2017
- (Slovenia) Jurica Golemac, 2017–2019
- (Slovenia) Andrej Žakelj, 2019–2020
