= Aris B.C. in international competitions =

Aris B.C. in international competitions is the history and statistics of Aris B.C. in FIBA Europe and Euroleague Basketball Company competitions.

== 1960s ==
=== 1966–67 FIBA European Cup Winners' Cup, 2nd–tier ===
The 1966–67 FIBA European Cup Winners' Cup was the 1st installment of FIBA's 2nd-tier level European-wide professional club basketball competition FIBA European Cup Winners' Cup (lately called FIBA Saporta Cup), running from December 8, 1966, to April 13, 1967. The trophy was won by Ignis Varese, who defeated Maccabi Tel Aviv by a result of 144–135 in a two-legged final on a home and away basis. Overall, Aris achieved in the present competition a record of 1 win against 1 defeat, in two successive rounds. More detailed:

==== First round ====
- Bye

==== Top 16 ====
- Tie played on January 12, 1967, and on January 19, 1967.

| Team 1 | Agg. | Team 2 | 1st leg | 2nd leg |
|---|---|---|---|---|
| Maccabi Tel Aviv (Israel) | 172–162 | (Greece) Aris | 101–71 | 71–91 |

== 1970s ==
=== 1974–75 FIBA Korać Cup, 3rd–tier ===
The 1974–75 FIBA Korać Cup was the 4th installment of the European 3rd-tier level professional basketball club competition FIBA Korać Cup, running from November 5, 1974, to March 25, 1975. The trophy was won by the title holder Birra Forst Cantù, who defeated CF Barcelona by a result of 181–154 in a two-legged final on a home and away basis. Overall, Aris achieved in present competition a record of 1 win against 1 defeat, in two successive rounds. More detailed:

==== First round ====
- Bye

==== Second round ====
- Tie played on November 26, 1974, and on December 3, 1974.

| Team 1 | Agg. | Team 2 | 1st leg | 2nd leg |
|---|---|---|---|---|
| Levski-Spartak (Bulgaria) | 124–120 | (Greece) Aris | 60–37 | 64–83 |

=== 1976–77 FIBA Korać Cup, 3rd–tier ===
The 1976–77 FIBA Korać Cup was the 6th installment of the European 3rd-tier level professional basketball club competition FIBA Korać Cup, running from October 19, 1976, to April 5, 1977. The trophy was won by Jugoplastika, who defeated Alco Bologna by a result of 87–84 at Palasport della Fiera in Genoa, Italy. Overall, Aris achieved in present competition a record of 0 wins against 2 defeats, in two successive rounds. More detailed:

==== First round ====
- Bye

==== Second round ====
- Tie played on November 16, 1976, and on November 23, 1976.

| Team 1 | Agg. | Team 2 | 1st leg | 2nd leg |
|---|---|---|---|---|
| Aris (Greece) | 147–198 | (Italy) IBP Stella Azzurra | 79–80 | 68–118 |

=== 1977–78 FIBA Korać Cup, 3rd–tier ===
The 1977–78 FIBA Korać Cup was the 7th installment of the European 3rd-tier level professional basketball club competition FIBA Korać Cup, running from November 15, 1977, to March 21, 1978. The trophy was won by Partizan, who defeated Bosna by a result of 117–110 (OT) at Sportska dvorana Borik in Banja Luka, Yugoslavia. Overall, Aris achieved in present competition a record of 0 wins against 2 defeats, in only one round. More detailed:

==== First round ====
- Tie played on November 15, 1977, and on November 22, 1977.

| Team 1 | Agg. | Team 2 | 1st leg | 2nd leg |
|---|---|---|---|---|
| Moderne (France) | 180–117 | (Greece) Aris | 98–46 | 82–71 |

== 1980s ==
=== 1979–80 FIBA European Champions Cup, 1st–tier ===
The 1979–80 FIBA European Champions Cup was the 23rd installment of the European top-tier level professional basketball club competition FIBA European Champions Cup (now called EuroLeague), running from November 11, 1979, to March 27, 1980. The trophy was won by Real Madrid, who defeated Maccabi Tel Aviv by a result of 89–85 at Deutschlandhalle in West Berlin, West Germany. Overall, Aris achieved in the present competition a record of 3 wins against 3 defeats, in only one round. More detailed:

==== First round ====
- Day 1 (October 10, 1979)

| Team 1 | Score | Team 2 |
|---|---|---|
| Aris (Greece) | 76–74 | (Romania) Dinamo București |

- Day 2 (October 18, 1979)

| Team 1 | Score | Team 2 |
|---|---|---|
| Efes Pilsen (Turkey) | 66–63 | (Greece) Aris |

- Day 3 (November 1, 1979)

| Team 1 | Score | Team 2 |
|---|---|---|
| Aris (Greece) | 104–103* | (Israel) Maccabi Tel Aviv |

^{*}Overtime at the end of regulation (95–95).

- Day 4 (November 8, 1979)

| Team 1 | Score | Team 2 |
|---|---|---|
| Dinamo București (Romania) | 77–71 | (Greece) Aris |

- Day 5 (November 22, 1979)

| Team 1 | Score | Team 2 |
|---|---|---|
| Aris (Greece) | 112–87 | (Turkey) Efes Pilsen |

- Day 6 (November 29, 1979)

| Team 1 | Score | Team 2 |
|---|---|---|
| Maccabi Tel Aviv (Israel) | 111–78 | (Greece) Aris |

- Group D standings:

| Pos. | Team | Pld. | Pts. | W | L | PF | PA | PD | Tie-break |
|---|---|---|---|---|---|---|---|---|---|
| 1. | (Israel) Maccabi Tel Aviv | 6 | 11 | 5 | 1 | 588 | 429 | +159 | |
| 2. | (Romania) Dinamo București | 6 | 9 | 3 | 3 | 482 | 461 | +21 | 1–1 (+4) |
| 3. | (Greece) Aris | 6 | 9 | 3 | 3 | 504 | 518 | -14 | 1–1 (-4) |
| 4. | (Turkey) Efes Pilsen | 6 | 7 | 1 | 5 | 398 | 564 | -166 | |

=== 1980–81 FIBA Korać Cup, 3rd–tier ===
The 1980–81 FIBA Korać Cup was the 10th installment of the European 3rd-tier level professional basketball club competition FIBA Korać Cup, running from October 8, 1980, to March 19, 1981. The trophy was won by Joventut Freixenet, who defeated Carrera Venezia by a result of 105–104 (Overtime (sports)|OT) at Palau Blaugrana in Barcelona, Spain. Overall, Aris achieved in the present competition a record of 4 wins against 4 defeats, in three successive rounds. More detailed:

==== First round ====
- Bye

==== Second round ====
- Tie played on November 5, 1980, and on November 12, 1980.

| Team 1 | Agg. | Team 2 | 1st leg | 2nd leg |
|---|---|---|---|---|
| Vasas (Hungary) | 174–187 | (Greece) Aris | 90–97 | 84–90 |

==== Top 16 ====
- Day 1 (December 10, 1980)

| Team 1 | Score | Team 2 |
|---|---|---|
| Carrera Venezia (Italy) | 115–78 | (Greece) Aris |

- Day 2 (December 17, 1980)

| Team 1 | Score | Team 2 |
|---|---|---|
| Aris (Greece) | 101–87 | (Czechoslovakia) Zbrojovka Brno |

- Day 3 (January 14, 1981)

| Team 1 | Score | Team 2 |
|---|---|---|
| Aris (Greece) | 87–83 | (Socialist Federal Republic of Yugoslavia) Jugoplastika |

- Day 4 (January 21, 1981)

| Team 1 | Score | Team 2 |
|---|---|---|
| Aris (Greece) | 85–86 | (Italy) Carrera Venezia |

- Day 5 (January 28, 1981)

| Team 1 | Score | Team 2 |
|---|---|---|
| Zbrojovka Brno (Czechoslovakia) | 114–83 | (Greece) Aris |

- Day 6 (February 4, 1981)

| Team 1 | Score | Team 2 |
|---|---|---|
| Jugoplastika (Socialist Federal Republic of Yugoslavia) | 110–93 | (Greece) Aris |

- Group C standings:

| Pos. | Team | Pld. | Pts. | W | L | PF | PA | PD | Tie-break |
|---|---|---|---|---|---|---|---|---|---|
| 1. | (Italy) Carrera Venezia | 6 | 12 | 6 | 0 | 609 | 534 | +75 | |
| 2. | (Czechoslovakia) Zbrojovka Brno | 6 | 8 | 2 | 4 | 587 | 582 | +5 | 2–2 (+19) |
| 3. | (Socialist Federal Republic of Yugoslavia) Jugoplastika | 6 | 8 | 2 | 4 | 576 | 588 | -12 | 2–2 (+14) |
| 4. | (Greece) Aris | 6 | 8 | 2 | 4 | 527 | 595 | -68 | 2–2 (-30) |

=== 1981–82 FIBA Korać Cup, 3rd–tier ===
The 1981–82 FIBA Korać Cup was the 11th installment of the European 3rd-tier level professional basketball club competition FIBA Korać Cup, running from October 7, 1981, to March 18, 1982. The trophy was won by Limoges CSP, who defeated Šibenka by a result of 90–84 at Palasport San Lazzaro in Padua, Italy. Overall, Aris achieved in present competition a record of 1 win against 1 defeat, in two successive rounds. More detailed:

==== First round ====
- Bye

==== Second round ====
- Tie played on November 4, 1981, and on November 11, 1981.

| Team 1 | Agg. | Team 2 | 1st leg | 2nd leg |
|---|---|---|---|---|
| Limoges CSP (France) | 183–165 | (Greece) Aris | 106–77 | 77–88 |

=== 1982–83 FIBA Korać Cup, 3rd–tier ===
The 1982–83 FIBA Korać Cup was the 12th installment of the European 3rd-tier level professional basketball club competition FIBA Korać Cup, running from October 6, 1982, to March 8, 1983. The trophy was won by the title holder Limoges CSP, who defeated -for second consecutive time- Šibenka by a result of 94–86 at Deutschlandhalle in West Berlin, West Germany. Overall, Aris achieved in present competition a record of 1 win against 3 defeats, in two successive rounds. More detailed:

==== First round ====
- Tie played on October 6, 1982, and on October 13, 1982.

| Team 1 | Agg. | Team 2 | 1st leg | 2nd leg |
|---|---|---|---|---|
| Hapoel Jerusalem (Israel) | 179–180 | (Greece) Aris | 113–87 | 66–93 |

==== Second round ====
- Tie played on November 3, 1982, and on November 10, 1982.

| Team 1 | Agg. | Team 2 | 1st leg | 2nd leg |
|---|---|---|---|---|
| Aris (Greece) | 146–175 | (Italy) Banco di Roma | 86–89 | 60–86 |

=== 1983–84 FIBA European Champions Cup, 1st–tier ===
The 1983–84 FIBA European Champions Cup was the 27th installment of the European top-tier level professional basketball club competition FIBA European Champions Cup (now called EuroLeague), running from September 15, 1983, to March 29, 1984. The trophy was won by Banco di Roma, who defeated FC Barcelona by a result of 79–73 at Patinoire des Vernets in Geneva, Switzerland. Overall, Aris achieved in the present competition a record of 5 wins against 1 defeats, in three successive rounds. More detailed:

==== First round ====
- Tie played on September 15, 1983, and on September 22, 1983.

| Team 1 | Agg. | Team 2 | 1st leg | 2nd leg |
|---|---|---|---|---|
| AEL (Cyprus) | 105–203 | (Greece) Aris | 49–106 | 56–97 |

==== Second round ====
- Tie played on September 29, 1983, and on October 6, 1983.

| Team 1 | Agg. | Team 2 | 1st leg | 2nd leg |
|---|---|---|---|---|
| ASC 1846 Göttingen (West Germany) | 150–168 | (Greece) Aris | 77–91 | 73–77 |

==== Top 12 ====
- Tie played on October 27, 1983, and on November 3, 1983.

| Team 1 | Agg. | Team 2 | 1st leg | 2nd leg |
|---|---|---|---|---|
| Aris (Greece) | 138–143 | (Israel) Maccabi Tel Aviv | 62–68 | 76–75 |

=== 1984–85 FIBA Korać Cup, 3rd–tier ===
The 1984–85 FIBA Korać Cup was the 14th installment of the European 3rd-tier level professional basketball club competition FIBA Korać Cup, running from October 3, 1984, to March 21, 1985. The trophy was won by Simac Milano, who defeated Ciaocrem Varese by a result of 91–78 at Palais du Midi in Brussels, Belgium. Overall, Aris achieved in present competition a record of 8 wins against 4 defeats, in four successive rounds. More detailed:

==== First round ====
- Tie played on October 3, 1984, and on October 10, 1984.

| Team 1 | Agg. | Team 2 | 1st leg | 2nd leg |
|---|---|---|---|---|
| Aris (Greece) | 207–166 | (Bulgaria) Levski-Spartak | 90–66 | 117–100 |

==== Second round ====
- Tie played on October 31, 1984, and on November 7, 1984.

| Team 1 | Agg. | Team 2 | 1st leg | 2nd leg |
|---|---|---|---|---|
| Aris (Greece) | 173–165 | (Socialist Federal Republic of Yugoslavia) Zadar | 84–71 | 89–94 |

==== Top 16 ====
- Day 1 (December 5, 1984)

| Team 1 | Score | Team 2 |
|---|---|---|
| Aris (Greece) | 106–100 | (Spain) Cajamadrid |

- Day 2 (December 12, 1984)

| Team 1 | Score | Team 2 |
|---|---|---|
| Aris (Greece) | 103–90 | (France) Moderne |

- Day 3 (January 9, 1985)

| Team 1 | Score | Team 2 |
|---|---|---|
| Birra Peroni Livorno (Italy) | 100–94 | (Greece) Aris |

- Day 4 (January 16, 1985)

| Team 1 | Score | Team 2 |
|---|---|---|
| Cajamadrid (Spain) | 85–81 | (Greece) Aris |

- Day 5 (January 23, 1985)

| Team 1 | Score | Team 2 |
|---|---|---|
| Moderne (France) | 91–115 | (Greece) Aris |

- Day 6 (January 30, 1985)

| Team 1 | Score | Team 2 |
|---|---|---|
| Aris (Greece) | 83–72 | (Italy) Birra Peroni Livorno |

- Group D standings:

| Pos. | Team | Pld. | Pts. | W | L | PF | PA | PD | Tie-break |
|---|---|---|---|---|---|---|---|---|---|
| 1. | (Greece) Aris | 6 | 10 | 4 | 2 | 582 | 538 | +44 | 1–1 (+5) |
| 2. | (Italy) Birra Peroni Livorno | 6 | 10 | 4 | 2 | 563 | 544 | +19 | 1–1 (-5) |
| 3. | (Spain) Cajamadrid | 6 | 9 | 3 | 3 | 543 | 551 | -8 | |
| 4. | (France) Moderne | 6 | 7 | 1 | 5 | 544 | 599 | -55 | |

==== Semifinals ====
- Tie played on February 20, 1985, and on February 27, 1985.

| Team 1 | Agg. | Team 2 | 1st leg | 2nd leg |
|---|---|---|---|---|
| Aris (Greece) | 151–172 | (Italy) Ciaocrem Varese | 80–77 | 71–95 |

=== 1985–86 FIBA European Champions Cup, 1st–tier ===
The 1985–86 FIBA European Champions Cup was the 29th installment of the European top-tier level professional basketball club competition FIBA European Champions Cup (now called EuroLeague), running from September 19, 1985, to April 3, 1986. The trophy was won by Cibona, who defeated Žalgiris by a result of 94–82 at Sportcsarnok in Budapest, Hungary. Overall, Aris achieved in the present competition a record of 4 wins against 2 defeats, in three successive rounds. More detailed:

==== First round ====
- Tie played on September 19, 1985, and on September 26, 1985.

| Team 1 | Agg. | Team 2 | 1st leg | 2nd leg |
|---|---|---|---|---|
| Partizani Tirana (Albania) | 162-175 | (Greece) Aris | 81–80 | 81–95 |

==== Second round ====
- Tie played on October 3, 1985, and on October 10, 1985.

| Team 1 | Agg. | Team 2 | 1st leg | 2nd leg |
|---|---|---|---|---|
| Bayer 04 Leverkusen (West Germany) | 148-182 | (Greece) Aris | 76–93 | 72–89 |

==== Top 12 ====
- Tie played on October 31, 1985, and on November 7, 1985.

| Team 1 | Agg. | Team 2 | 1st leg | 2nd leg |
|---|---|---|---|---|
| Aris (Greece) | 176-186 | (France) Limoges CSP | 89–81 | 87–105 |

=== 1986–87 FIBA European Champions Cup, 1st–tier ===
The 1986–87 FIBA European Champions Cup was the 30th installment of the European top-tier level professional basketball club competition FIBA European Champions Cup (now called EuroLeague), running from September 18, 1986, to April 2, 1987. The trophy was won by Tracer Milano, who defeated Maccabi Tel Aviv by a result of 71–69 at Centre Intercommunal de Glace de Malley in Lausanne, Switzerland. Overall, Aris achieved in the present competition a record of 3 wins against 1 defeat, in three successive rounds. More detailed:

==== First round ====
- Bye

==== Second round ====
- Tie played on October 2, 1986, and on October 9, 1986.

| Team 1 | Agg. | Team 2 | 1st leg | 2nd leg |
|---|---|---|---|---|
| Aris (Greece) | 240-154 | (Belgium) Sunair Oostende | 115–77 | 125–77 |

==== Top 12 ====
- Tie played on October 30, 1986, and on November 6, 1986.

| Team 1 | Agg. | Team 2 | 1st leg | 2nd leg |
|---|---|---|---|---|
| Aris (Greece) | 147–150 | (Italy) Tracer Milano | 98–67 | 49–83 |

=== 1987–88 FIBA European Champions Cup, 1st–tier ===
The 1987–88 FIBA European Champions Cup was the 31st installment of the European top-tier level professional basketball club competition FIBA European Champions Cup (now called EuroLeague), running from September 24, 1987, to April 7, 1988. The trophy was won by Tracer Milano, who defeated Maccabi Tel Aviv by a result of 90–84 at Flanders Expo in Ghent, Belgium. Overall, Aris achieved in the present competition a record of 11 wins against 7 defeats, in five successive rounds. More detailed:

==== First round ====
- Bye

==== Top 16 ====
- Tie played on October 15, 1987, and on October 22, 1987.

| Team 1 | Agg. | Team 2 | 1st leg | 2nd leg |
|---|---|---|---|---|
| Pully Basket (Switzerland) | 229–240 | (Greece) Aris | 125–127 | 104–113 |

==== Quarterfinals ====
- Day 1 (November 26, 1987)

| Team 1 | Score | Team 2 |
|---|---|---|
| Aris (Greece) | 92–86 | (France) Orthez |

- Day 2 (December 3, 1987)

| Team 1 | Score | Team 2 |
|---|---|---|
| FC Barcelona (Spain) | 88–89 | (Greece) Aris |

- Day 3 (December 10, 1987)

| Team 1 | Score | Team 2 |
|---|---|---|
| Maccabi Tel Aviv (Israel) | 95–91 | (Greece) Aris |

- Day 4 (December 17, 1987)

| Team 1 | Score | Team 2 |
|---|---|---|
| Aris (Greece) | 107–101 | (West Germany) Saturn 77 Köln |

- Day 5 (January 7, 1988)

| Team 1 | Score | Team 2 |
|---|---|---|
| Partizan (Socialist Federal Republic of Yugoslavia) | 101–94 | (Greece) Aris |

- Day 6 (January 14, 1988)

| Team 1 | Score | Team 2 |
|---|---|---|
| Aris (Greece) | 120–99 | (Netherlands) Nashua EBBC |

- Day 7 (January 21, 1988)

| Team 1 | Score | Team 2 |
|---|---|---|
| Aris (Greece) | 120–95 | (Italy) Tracer Milano |

- Day 8 (February 11, 1988)

| Team 1 | Score | Team 2 |
|---|---|---|
| Orthez (France) | 97–81 | (Greece) Aris |

- Day 9 (February 18, 1988)

| Team 1 | Score | Team 2 |
|---|---|---|
| Aris (Greece) | 93–107 | (Spain) FC Barcelona |

- Day 10 (February 25, 1988)

| Team 1 | Score | Team 2 |
|---|---|---|
| Aris (Greece) | 93–77 | (Israel) Maccabi Tel Aviv |

- Day 11 (March 3, 1988)

| Team 1 | Score | Team 2 |
|---|---|---|
| Saturn 77 Köln (West Germany) | 98–100 | (Greece) Aris |

- Day 12 (March 10, 1988)

| Team 1 | Score | Team 2 |
|---|---|---|
| Aris (Greece) | 96–87 | (Socialist Federal Republic of Yugoslavia) Partizan |

- Day 13 (March 17, 1988)

| Team 1 | Score | Team 2 |
|---|---|---|
| Nashua EBBC (Netherlands) | 87–88 | (Greece) Aris |

- Day 14 (March 24, 1988)

| Team 1 | Score | Team 2 |
|---|---|---|
| Tracer Milano (Italy) | 97–82 | (Greece) Aris |

- Quarterfinals group stage standings:

| Pos. | Team | Pld. | Pts. | W | L | PF | PA | PD | Tie-break |
|---|---|---|---|---|---|---|---|---|---|
| 1. | (Socialist Federal Republic of Yugoslavia) Partizan | 14 | 24 | 10 | 4 | 1290 | 1260 | +30 | |
| 2. | (Greece) Aris | 14 | 23 | 9 | 5 | 1346 | 1315 | +31 | 1–1 (+10) |
| 3. | (Italy) Tracer Milano | 14 | 23 | 9 | 5 | 1304 | 1286 | +18 | 1–1 (-10) |
| 4. | (Israel) Maccabi Tel Aviv | 14 | 22 | 8 | 6 | 1326 | 1320 | +6 | |
| 5. | (Spain) FC Barcelona | 14 | 21 | 7 | 7 | 1367 | 1278 | +89 | |
| 6. | (West Germany) Saturn 77 Köln | 14 | 19 | 5 | 9 | 1402 | 1415 | -13 | |
| 7. | (France) Orthez | 14 | 18 | 4 | 10 | 1210 | 1229 | -19 | 1–1 (+3) |
| 8. | (Netherlands) Nashua EBBC | 14 | 18 | 4 | 10 | 1299 | 1441 | -142 | 1–1 (-3) |

==== Final four ====
The 1988 FIBA European Champions Cup Final Four, was the 1987–88 season's FIBA European Champions Cup Final Four tournament, organized by FIBA Europe

- Semifinals: April 5, 1988 at Flanders Expo in Ghent, Belgium.

| Team 1 | Score | Team 2 |
|---|---|---|
| Aris (Greece) | 82–87 | (Italy) Tracer Milano |

- 3rd place game: April 7, 1988 at Flanders Expo in Ghent, Belgium.

| Team 1 | Score | Team 2 |
|---|---|---|
| Partizan (Socialist Federal Republic of Yugoslavia) | 105–93 | (Greece) Aris |

- Final four standings:

| Pos. | Team | Rec. |
|---|---|---|
| | (Italy) Tracer Milano | 2–0 |
| Silver medal | (Israel) Maccabi Tel Aviv | 1–1 |
| Bronze medal | (Socialist Federal Republic of Yugoslavia) Partizan | 1–1 |
| 4th | (Greece) Aris | 0–2 |

=== 1988–89 FIBA European Champions Cup, 1st–tier ===
The 1988–89 FIBA European Champions Cup was the 32nd installment of the European top-tier level professional basketball club competition FIBA European Champions Cup (now called EuroLeague), running from October 13, 1988, to April 6, 1989. The trophy was won by Jugoplastika, who defeated Maccabi Tel Aviv by a result of 75–69 at Olympiahalle in Munich, West Germany. Overall, Aris achieved in the present competition a record of 12 wins against 8 defeats, in five successive rounds. More detailed:

==== First round ====
- Tie played on October 13, 1988, and on October 20, 1988.

| Team 1 | Agg. | Team 2 | 1st leg | 2nd leg |
|---|---|---|---|---|
| AEL (Cyprus) | 143–230 | (Greece) Aris | 67–115 | 76–115 |

==== Top 16 ====
- Tie played on November 3, 1988, and on November 10, 1988.

| Team 1 | Agg. | Team 2 | 1st leg | 2nd leg |
|---|---|---|---|---|
| Södertälje (Sweden) | 175–190 | (Greece) Aris | 93–85 | 82–105 |

==== Quarterfinals ====
- Day 1 (December 8, 1988)

| Team 1 | Score | Team 2 |
|---|---|---|
| Aris (Greece) | 116–83 | (Netherlands) Nashua EBBC |

- Day 2 (December 15, 1988)

| Team 1 | Score | Team 2 |
|---|---|---|
| FC Barcelona (Spain) | 97–81 | (Greece) Aris |

- Day 3 (December 22, 1988)

| Team 1 | Score | Team 2 |
|---|---|---|
| Maccabi Tel Aviv (Israel) | 97–77 | (Greece) Aris |

- Day 4 (January 5, 1989)

| Team 1 | Score | Team 2 |
|---|---|---|
| Aris (Greece) | 89–83 | (Soviet Union) CSKA Moscow |

- Day 5 (January 12, 1989)

| Team 1 | Score | Team 2 |
|---|---|---|
| Jugoplastika (Socialist Federal Republic of Yugoslavia) | 94–83 | (Greece) Aris |

- Day 6 (January 19, 1989)

| Team 1 | Score | Team 2 |
|---|---|---|
| Aris (Greece) | 80–77 | (France) Limoges CSP |

- Day 7 (January 26, 1989)

| Team 1 | Score | Team 2 |
|---|---|---|
| Aris (Greece) | 79–72 | (Italy) Scavolini Pesaro |

- Day 8 (February 2, 1989)

| Team 1 | Score | Team 2 |
|---|---|---|
| Nashua EBBC (Netherlands) | 85–90 | (Greece) Aris |

- Day 9 (February 16, 1989)

| Team 1 | Score | Team 2 |
|---|---|---|
| Aris (Greece) | 90–84 | (Spain) FC Barcelona |

- Day 10 (February 23, 1989)

| Team 1 | Score | Team 2 |
|---|---|---|
| Aris (Greece) | 90–102 | (Israel) Maccabi Tel Aviv |

- Day 11 (March 2, 1989)

| Team 1 | Score | Team 2 |
|---|---|---|
| CSKA Moscow (Soviet Union) | 88–100 | (Greece) Aris |

- Day 12 (March 9, 1989)

| Team 1 | Score | Team 2 |
|---|---|---|
| Aris (Greece) | 96–85 | (Socialist Federal Republic of Yugoslavia) Jugoplastika |

- Day 13 (March 16, 1989)

| Team 1 | Score | Team 2 |
|---|---|---|
| Limoges CSP (France) | 115–106 | (Greece) Aris |

- Day 14 (March 23, 1989)

| Team 1 | Score | Team 2 |
|---|---|---|
| Scavolini Pesaro (Italy) | 99–92 | (Greece) Aris |

- Quarterfinals group stage standings:

| Pos. | Team | Pld. | Pts. | W | L | PF | PA | PD | Tie-break |
|---|---|---|---|---|---|---|---|---|---|
| 1. | (Israel) Maccabi Tel Aviv | 14 | 26 | 12 | 2 | 1314 | 1221 | +93 | |
| 2. | (Spain) FC Barcelona | 14 | 25 | 11 | 3 | 1207 | 1120 | +87 | |
| 3. | (Socialist Federal Republic of Yugoslavia) Jugoplastika | 14 | 22 | 8 | 6 | 1205 | 1167 | +38 | 1–1 (0) |
| 4. | (Greece) Aris | 14 | 22 | 8 | 6 | 1269 | 1261 | +8 | 1–1 (0) |
| 5. | (France) Limoges CSP | 14 | 20 | 6 | 8 | 1269 | 1266 | +3 | |
| 6. | (Italy) Scavolini Pesaro | 14 | 19 | 5 | 9 | 1130 | 1174 | -44 | |
| 7. | (Soviet Union) CSKA Moscow | 14 | 18 | 4 | 10 | 1156 | 1194 | -38 | |
| 8. | (Netherlands) Nashua EBBC | 14 | 16 | 2 | 12 | 1159 | 1306 | -147 | |

==== Final four ====
The 1989 FIBA European Champions Cup Final Four, was the 1988–89 season's FIBA European Champions Cup Final Four tournament, organized by FIBA Europe

- Semifinals: April 4, 1989 at Olympiahalle in Munich, West Germany.

| Team 1 | Score | Team 2 |
|---|---|---|
| Maccabi Tel Aviv (Israel) | 99–86 | (Greece) Aris |

- 3rd place game: April 6, 1989 at Olympiahalle in Munich, West Germany.

| Team 1 | Score | Team 2 |
|---|---|---|
| Aris (Greece) | 88–71 | (Spain) FC Barcelona |

- Final four standings:

| Pos. | Team | Rec. |
|---|---|---|
| | (Socialist Federal Republic of Yugoslavia) Jugoplastika | 2–0 |
| Silver medal | (Israel) Maccabi Tel Aviv | 1–1 |
| Bronze medal | (Greece) Aris | 1–1 |
| 4th | (Spain) FC Barcelona | 0–2 |

== 1990s ==
=== 1989–90 FIBA European Champions Cup, 1st–tier ===
The 1989–90 FIBA European Champions Cup was the 33rd installment of the European top-tier level professional basketball club competition FIBA European Champions Cup (now called EuroLeague), running from September 28, 1989, to April 19, 1990. The trophy was won by Jugoplastika, who defeated FC Barcelona Banca Catalana by a result of 72–67 at Pabellón Príncipe Felipe in Zaragoza, Spain. Overall, Aris achieved in the present competition a record of 10 wins against 8 defeats, in five successive rounds. More detailed:

==== First round ====
- Bye

==== Top 16 ====
- Tie played on October 26, 1989, and on November 2, 1989.

| Team 1 | Agg. | Team 2 | 1st leg | 2nd leg |
|---|---|---|---|---|
| Balkan Botevgrad (Bulgaria) | 179–226 | (Greece) Aris | 91–107 | 88–119 |

==== Quarterfinals ====
- Day 1 (December 7, 1989)

| Team 1 | Score | Team 2 |
|---|---|---|
| Aris (Greece) | 116–92 | (Poland) Lech Poznań |

- Day 2 (December 14, 1989)

| Team 1 | Score | Team 2 |
|---|---|---|
| FC Barcelona Banca Catalana (Spain) | 90–56 | (Greece) Aris |

- Day 3 (January 4, 1990)

| Team 1 | Score | Team 2 |
|---|---|---|
| Aris (Greece) | 95–77 | (Italy) Philips Milano |

- Day 4 (January 11, 1990)

| Team 1 | Score | Team 2 |
|---|---|---|
| Limoges CSP (France) | 94–84 | (Greece) Aris |

- Day 5 (January 18, 1990)

| Team 1 | Score | Team 2 |
|---|---|---|
| Aris (Greece) | 110–102 | (Netherlands) Commodore Den Helder |

- Day 6 (January 25, 1990)

| Team 1 | Score | Team 2 |
|---|---|---|
| Jugoplastika (Socialist Federal Republic of Yugoslavia) | 85–89 | (Greece) Aris |

- Day 7 (February 1, 1990)

| Team 1 | Score | Team 2 |
|---|---|---|
| Aris (Greece) | 98–81 | (Israel) Maccabi Tel Aviv |

- Day 8 (February 8, 1990)

| Team 1 | Score | Team 2 |
|---|---|---|
| Lech Poznań (Poland) | 78–103 | (Greece) Aris |

- Day 9 (February 22, 1990)

| Team 1 | Score | Team 2 |
|---|---|---|
| Aris (Greece) | 94–100 | (Spain) FC Barcelona Banca Catalana |

- Day 10 (March 1, 1990)

| Team 1 | Score | Team 2 |
|---|---|---|
| Philips Milano (Italy) | 100–92 | (Greece) Aris |

- Day 11 (March 8, 1990)

| Team 1 | Score | Team 2 |
|---|---|---|
| Aris (Greece) | 89–79 | (France) Limoges CSP |

- Day 12 (March 15, 1990)

| Team 1 | Score | Team 2 |
|---|---|---|
| Commodore Den Helder (Netherlands) | 72–99 | (Greece) Aris |

- Day 13 (March 22, 1990)

| Team 1 | Score | Team 2 |
|---|---|---|
| Aris (Greece) | 79–80 | (Socialist Federal Republic of Yugoslavia) Jugoplastika |

- Day 14 (March 29, 1990)

| Team 1 | Score | Team 2 |
|---|---|---|
| Maccabi Tel Aviv (Israel) | 94–92 | (Greece) Aris |

- Quarterfinals group stage standings:

| Pos. | Team | Pld. | Pts. | W | L | PF | PA | PD |
|---|---|---|---|---|---|---|---|---|
| 1. | (Spain) FC Barcelona Banca Catalana | 14 | 26 | 12 | 2 | 1291 | 1084 | +207 |
| 2. | (Socialist Federal Republic of Yugoslavia) Jugoplastika | 14 | 25 | 11 | 3 | 1277 | 1114 | +163 |
| 3. | (France) Limoges CSP | 14 | 24 | 10 | 4 | 1320 | 1217 | +103 |
| 4. | (Greece) Aris | 14 | 22 | 8 | 6 | 1296 | 1224 | +72 |
| 5. | (Italy) Philips Milano | 14 | 21 | 7 | 7 | 1271 | 1279 | -8 |
| 6. | (Israel) Maccabi Tel Aviv | 14 | 20 | 6 | 8 | 1185 | 1241 | -56 |
| 7. | (Netherlands) Commodore Den Helder | 14 | 16 | 2 | 12 | 1147 | 1291 | -144 |
| 8. | (Poland) Lech Poznań | 14 | 14 | 0 | 14 | 1147 | 1484 | -337 |

==== Final four ====
The 1990 FIBA European Champions Cup Final Four, was the 1989–90 season's FIBA European Champions Cup Final Four tournament, organized by FIBA Europe.

- Semifinals: April 17, 1990 at Pabellón Príncipe Felipe in Zaragoza, Spain.

| Team 1 | Score | Team 2 |
|---|---|---|
| FC Barcelona Banca Catalana (Spain) | 104–83 | (Greece) Aris |

- 3rd place game: April 19, 1990 at Pabellón Príncipe Felipe in Zaragoza, Spain.

| Team 1 | Score | Team 2 |
|---|---|---|
| Aris (Greece) | 91–103 | (France) Limoges CSP |

- Final four standings:

| Pos. | Team | Rec. |
|---|---|---|
| | (Socialist Federal Republic of Yugoslavia) Jugoplastika | 2–0 |
| Silver medal | (Spain) FC Barcelona Banca Catalana | 1–1 |
| Bronze medal | (France) Limoges CSP | 1–1 |
| 4th | (Greece) Aris | 0–2 |

=== 1990–91 FIBA European Champions Cup, 1st–tier ===
The 1990–91 FIBA European Champions Cup was the 34th installment of the European top-tier level professional basketball club competition FIBA European Champions Cup (now called EuroLeague), running from September 27, 1990, to April 18, 1991. The trophy was won by POP 84, who defeated FC Barcelona Banca Catalana by a result of 70–65 at Palais Omnisports de Paris-Bercy in Paris, France. Overall, Aris achieved in the present competition a record of 9 wins against 7 defeats, in three successive rounds. More detailed:

==== First round ====
- Bye

==== Top 16 ====
- Tie played on October 25, 1990, and on November 1, 1990.

| Team 1 | Agg. | Team 2 | 1st leg | 2nd leg |
|---|---|---|---|---|
| Saab UU (Finland) | 183–256 | (Greece) Aris | 92–116 | 91–140 |

==== Quarterfinals ====
- Day 1 (December 13, 1990)

| Team 1 | Score | Team 2 |
|---|---|---|
| Aris (Greece) | 103–90 | (England) Kingston |

- Day 2 (December 20, 1990)

| Team 1 | Score | Team 2 |
|---|---|---|
| FC Barcelona Banca Catalana (Spain) | 92–64 | (Greece) Aris |

- Day 3 (January 3, 1991)

| Team 1 | Score | Team 2 |
|---|---|---|
| Bayer 04 Leverkusen (Germany) | 98–89 | (Greece) Aris |

- Day 4 (January 10, 1991)

| Team 1 | Score | Team 2 |
|---|---|---|
| Aris (Greece) | 92–71 | (Socialist Federal Republic of Yugoslavia) POP 84 |

- Day 5 (January 17, 1991)

| Team 1 | Score | Team 2 |
|---|---|---|
| Aris (Greece) | 93–81 | (Israel) Maccabi Tel Aviv |

- Day 6 (January 24, 1991)

| Team 1 | Score | Team 2 |
|---|---|---|
| Aris (Greece) | 108–88 | (France) Limoges CSP |

- Day 7 (January 31, 1991)

| Team 1 | Score | Team 2 |
|---|---|---|
| Aris (Greece) | 96–95 | (Italy) Scavolini Pesaro |

- Day 8 (February 7, 1991)

| Team 1 | Score | Team 2 |
|---|---|---|
| Kingston (England) | 97–96* | (Greece) Aris |

^{*}Two overtimes at the end of regulation (82–82 and 89–89).

- Day 9 (February 14, 1991)

| Team 1 | Score | Team 2 |
|---|---|---|
| Aris (Greece) | 93–110 | (Spain) FC Barcelona Banca Catalana |

- Day 10 (February 28, 1991)

| Team 1 | Score | Team 2 |
|---|---|---|
| Aris (Greece) | 133–117 | (Germany) Bayer 04 Leverkusen |

- Day 11 (March 7, 1991)

| Team 1 | Score | Team 2 |
|---|---|---|
| POP 84 (Socialist Federal Republic of Yugoslavia) | 93–63 | (Greece) Aris |

- Day 12 (March 14, 1991)

| Team 1 | Score | Team 2 |
|---|---|---|
| Maccabi Tel Aviv (Israel) | 101–89 | (Greece) Aris |

- Day 13 (March 21, 1991)

| Team 1 | Score | Team 2 |
|---|---|---|
| Limoges CSP (France) | 98–106 | (Greece) Aris |

- Day 14 (March 28, 1991)

| Team 1 | Score | Team 2 |
|---|---|---|
| Scavolini Pesaro (Italy) | 93–89 | (Greece) Aris |

- Quarterfinals group stage standings:

| Pos. | Team | Pld. | Pts. | W | L | PF | PA | PD | Tie-break |
|---|---|---|---|---|---|---|---|---|---|
| 1. | (Spain) FC Barcelona Banca Catalana | 14 | 25 | 11 | 3 | 1276 | 1148 | +128 | |
| 2. | (Socialist Federal Republic of Yugoslavia) POP 84 | 14 | 23 | 9 | 5 | 1208 | 1174 | +34 | |
| 3. | (Italy) Scavolini Pesaro | 14 | 22 | 8 | 6 | 1318 | 1290 | +28 | 2–0 |
| 4. | (Israel) Maccabi Tel Aviv | 14 | 22 | 8 | 6 | 1224 | 1163 | +61 | 0–2 |
| 5. | (Greece) Aris | 14 | 21 | 7 | 7 | 1314 | 1324 | -10 | |
| 6. | (Germany) Bayer 04 Leverkusen | 14 | 20 | 6 | 8 | 1334 | 1392 | -58 | |
| 7. | (England) Kingston | 14 | 18 | 4 | 10 | 1141 | 1221 | -80 | |
| 8. | (France) Limoges CSP | 14 | 17 | 3 | 11 | 1251 | 1354 | -104 | |

=== 1991–92 FIBA European League, 1st–tier ===
The 1991–92 FIBA European League was the 35th installment of the European top-tier level professional basketball club competition FIBA European League (now called EuroLeague), running from September 12, 1991, to April 16, 1992. The trophy was won by Partizan, who defeated Montigalà Joventut by a result of 71–70 at Abdi İpekçi Arena in Istanbul, Turkey. Overall, Aris achieved in the present competition a record of 7 wins against 11 defeats, in three successive rounds. (Note: Due to ongoing Yugoslav Wars, the three former Yugoslavian teams were forced to play all their home games outside their countries. All of them chose cities in Spain as the substitute home courts: eventual winner Partizan played in Fuenlabrada, title holder Slobodna Dalmacija in A Coruña and Cibona in Puerto Real.) More detailed:

==== First round ====
- Tie played on September 12, 1991, and on September 19, 1991.

| Team 1 | Agg. | Team 2 | 1st leg | 2nd leg |
|---|---|---|---|---|
| Partizani Tirana (Albania) | 146–208 | (Greece) Aris | 79–98 | 67–110 |

==== Second round ====
- Tie played on October 3, 1991, and on October 10, 1991.

| Team 1 | Agg. | Team 2 | 1st leg | 2nd leg |
|---|---|---|---|---|
| Śląsk Wrocław (Poland) | 162–181 | (Greece) Aris | 74–75 | 88–106 |

==== Top 16 ====
- Day 1 (October 31, 1991)

| Team 1 | Score | Team 2 |
|---|---|---|
| Aris (Greece) | 103–89 | (Germany) Bayer 04 Leverkusen |

- Day 2 (November 7, 1991)

| Team 1 | Score | Team 2 |
|---|---|---|
| Estudiantes Argentaria (Spain) | 88–58 | (Greece) Aris |

- Day 3 (November 28, 1991)

| Team 1 | Score | Team 2 |
|---|---|---|
| Montigalà Joventut (Spain) | 91–69 | (Greece) Aris |

- Day 4 (December 5, 1991)

| Team 1 | Score | Team 2 |
|---|---|---|
| Aris (Greece) | 74–69 | (Netherlands) Commodore Den Helder |

- Day 5 (December 12, 1991)

| Team 1 | Score | Team 2 |
|---|---|---|
| Maes Pils (Belgium) | 92–76 | (Greece) Aris |

- Day 6 (December 19, 1991)

| Team 1 | Score | Team 2 |
|---|---|---|
| Aris (Greece) | 108–111* | (Italy) Philips Milano |

^{*}Overtime at the end of regulation (98–98).

- Day 7 (January 9, 1992)

| Team 1 | Score | Team 2 |
|---|---|---|
| Aris (Greece) | 75–83 | (Socialist Federal Republic of Yugoslavia) Partizan |

- Day 8 (January 16, 1992)

| Team 1 | Score | Team 2 |
|---|---|---|
| Bayer 04 Leverkusen (Germany) | 126–80 | (Greece) Aris |

- Day 9 (January 23, 1992)

| Team 1 | Score | Team 2 |
|---|---|---|
| Aris (Greece) | 88–99 | (Spain) Estudiantes Argentaria |

- Day 10 (January 30, 1992)

| Team 1 | Score | Team 2 |
|---|---|---|
| Aris (Greece) | 92–118 | (Spain) Montigalà Joventut |

- Day 11 (February 6, 1992)

| Team 1 | Score | Team 2 |
|---|---|---|
| Commodore Den Helder (Netherlands) | 93–79 | (Greece) Aris |

- Day 12 (February 13, 1992)

| Team 1 | Score | Team 2 |
|---|---|---|
| Aris (Greece) | 86–84 | (Belgium) Maes Pils |

- Day 13 (February 20, 1992)

| Team 1 | Score | Team 2 |
|---|---|---|
| Philips Milano (Italy) | 117–86 | (Greece) Aris |

- Day 14 (February 27, 1992)

| Team 1 | Score | Team 2 |
|---|---|---|
| Partizan (Socialist Federal Republic of Yugoslavia) | 99–65 | (Greece) Aris |

- Group B standings:

| Pos. | Team | Pld. | Pts. | W | L | PF | PA | PD | Tie-break |
|---|---|---|---|---|---|---|---|---|---|
| 1. | (Spain) Montigalà Joventut | 14 | 25 | 11 | 3 | 1276 | 1114 | +162 | |
| 2. | (Spain) Estudiantes Argentaria | 14 | 24 | 10 | 4 | 1145 | 1096 | +49 | 1–1 (+1) |
| 3. | (Italy) Philips Milano | 14 | 24 | 10 | 4 | 1264 | 1161 | +103 | 1–1 (-1) |
| 4. | (Socialist Federal Republic of Yugoslavia) Partizan | 14 | 23 | 9 | 5 | 1178 | 1077 | +101 | |
| 5. | (Germany) Bayer 04 Leverkusen | 14 | 21 | 7 | 7 | 1217 | 1154 | +63 | |
| 6. | (Belgium) Maes Pils | 14 | 18 | 4 | 10 | 1112 | 1230 | -118 | |
| 7. | (Greece) Aris | 14 | 17 | 3 | 11 | 1139 | 1359 | -220 | |
| 8. | (Netherlands) Commodore Den Helder | 14 | 16 | 2 | 12 | 1050 | 1190 | -140 | |

=== 1992–93 FIBA European Cup, 2nd–tier ===
The 1992–93 FIBA European Cup was the 27th installment of FIBA's 2nd-tier level European-wide professional club basketball competition FIBA European Cup (lately called FIBA Saporta Cup), running from September 8, 1992, to March 16, 1993. The trophy was won by Sato Aris, who defeated Efes Pilsen by a result of 50–48 at Palasport Parco Ruffini in Turin, Italy. Overall, Sato Aris achieved in the present competition a record of 16 wins against 1 defeat, in six successive rounds. More detailed:

==== First round ====
- Bye

==== Second round ====
- Tie played on September 29, 1992, and on October 6, 1992.

| Team 1 | Agg. | Team 2 | 1st leg | 2nd leg |
|---|---|---|---|---|
| RTI Minsk (Belarus) | 129–224 | (Greece) Sato Aris | 59–117 | 70–107 |

==== Third round ====
- Tie played on October 27, 1992, and on November 3, 1992.

| Team 1 | Agg. | Team 2 | 1st leg | 2nd leg |
|---|---|---|---|---|
| Śląsk Wrocław (Poland) | 155–192 | (Greece) Sato Aris | 80–90 | 75–102 |

==== Top 12 ====
- Day 1 (November 25, 1992)

| Team 1 | Score | Team 2 |
|---|---|---|
| Sato Aris (Greece) | 88–75 | (Israel) Hapoel Galil Elyon |

- Day 2 (December 1, 1992)

| Team 1 | Score | Team 2 |
|---|---|---|
| Sato Aris (Greece) | 104–72 | (France) Pitch Cholet |

- Day 3 (December 8, 1992)

| Team 1 | Score | Team 2 |
|---|---|---|
| Benfica (Portugal) | 67–75 | (Greece) Sato Aris |

- Day 4 (December 15, 1992)

| Team 1 | Score | Team 2 |
|---|---|---|
| Sato Aris (Greece) | 89–56 | (Croatia) Slobodna Dalmacija |

- Day 5 (January 5, 1993)

| Team 1 | Score | Team 2 |
|---|---|---|
| Sato Aris (Greece) | 67–61 | (Ukraine) Budivelnyk |

- Day 6 (January 13, 1993)

| Team 1 | Score | Team 2 |
|---|---|---|
| Hapoel Galil Elyon (Israel) | 80–69 | (Greece) Sato Aris |

- Day 7 (January 20, 1993)

| Team 1 | Score | Team 2 |
|---|---|---|
| Pitch Cholet (France) | 60–70 | (Greece) Sato Aris |

- Day 8 (January 26, 1993)

| Team 1 | Score | Team 2 |
|---|---|---|
| Sato Aris (Greece) | 83–72 | (Portugal) Benfica |

- Day 9 (February 2, 1993)

| Team 1 | Score | Team 2 |
|---|---|---|
| Slobodna Dalmacija (Croatia) | 66–76 | (Greece) Sato Aris |

- Day 10 (February 9, 1993)

| Team 1 | Score | Team 2 |
|---|---|---|
| Budivelnyk (Ukraine) | 80–94 | (Greece) Sato Aris |

- Group B standings:

| Pos. | Team | Pld. | Pts. | W | L | PF | PA | PD | Tie-break |
|---|---|---|---|---|---|---|---|---|---|
| 1. | (Greece) Sato Aris | 10 | 19 | 9 | 1 | 815 | 689 | +126 | |
| 2. | (Israel) Hapoel Galil Elyon | 10 | 17 | 7 | 3 | 828 | 798 | +30 | 1–1 (+3) |
| 3. | (Croatia) Slobodna Dalmacija | 10 | 17 | 7 | 3 | 751 | 708 | +43 | 1–1 (-3) |
| 4. | (Portugal) Benfica | 10 | 14 | 4 | 6 | 768 | 770 | -2 | |
| 5. | (France) Pitch Cholet | 10 | 12 | 2 | 8 | 758 | 844 | -86 | |
| 6. | (Ukraine) Budivelnyk | 10 | 11 | 1 | 9 | 739 | 850 | -111 | |

==== Semifinals ====
- Best-of-3 playoff: Game 1 away on February 18, 1993 / Game 2 at home on February 23, 1993.

| Team 1 | Agg. | Team 2 | 1st leg | 2nd leg | 3rd leg |
|---|---|---|---|---|---|
| NatWest Zaragoza (Spain) | 0–2 | (Greece) Sato Aris | 84–86 | 66–82 | – – – |

==== Final ====
- March 16, 1993 at Palasport Parco Ruffini in Turin, Italy.

| Team 1 | Score | Team 2 |
|---|---|---|
| Efes Pilsen (Turkey) | 48–50 | (Greece) Sato Aris |

=== 1993–94 FIBA European Cup, 2nd–tier ===
The 1993–94 FIBA European Cup was the 28th installment of FIBA's 2nd-tier level European-wide professional club basketball competition FIBA European Cup (lately called FIBA Saporta Cup), running from September 7, 1993, to March 15, 1994. The trophy was won by Smelt Olimpija, who defeated Taugrés by a result of 91–81 at Centre Intercommunal de Glace Malley in Lausanne, Switzerland. Overall, Sato Aris achieved in the present competition a record of 11 wins against 6 defeats, in five successive rounds. (Note: Due to his punishment by FIBA Europe for the episodes after the final against Efes Pilsen in Turin, Sato Aris was forced to play all his home games outside his city. Therefore he played all the home games in Athens at the home court of Panionios.) More detailed:

==== First round ====
- Bye

==== Second round ====
- Tie played on September 27, 1993, and on October 5, 1993.

| Team 1 | Agg. | Team 2 | 1st leg | 2nd leg |
|---|---|---|---|---|
| APOEL (Cyprus) | 133–192 | (Greece) Sato Aris | 76–94 | 57–98 |

==== Third round ====
- Tie played on October 26, 1993, and on November 2, 1993.

| Team 1 | Agg. | Team 2 | 1st leg | 2nd leg |
|---|---|---|---|---|
| Sato Aris (Greece) | 166–156 | (Israel) Hapoel Givatayim | 78–65 | 88–91* |

^{*}The score in the second leg at the end of regulation was 81–68 for Hapoel Givatayim, so it was necessary to play an extra-time to decide the winner of this match.

==== Top 12 ====
- Day 1 (November 23, 1993)

| Team 1 | Score | Team 2 |
|---|---|---|
| Sato Aris (Greece) | 98–95 | (Croatia) Zadar |

- Day 2 (November 30, 1993)

| Team 1 | Score | Team 2 |
|---|---|---|
| Levski Sofia (Bulgaria) | 112–128 | (Greece) Sato Aris |

- Day 3 (December 7, 1993)

| Team 1 | Score | Team 2 |
|---|---|---|
| Sato Aris (Greece) | 83–78 | (Israel) Hapoel Galil Elyon |

- Day 4 (December 14, 1993)

| Team 1 | Score | Team 2 |
|---|---|---|
| Pitch Cholet (France) | 91–87 | (Greece) Sato Aris |

- Day 5 (January 4, 1994)

| Team 1 | Score | Team 2 |
|---|---|---|
| Sato Aris (Greece) | 95–87 | (Portugal) Ovarense |

- Day 6 (January 11, 1994)

| Team 1 | Score | Team 2 |
|---|---|---|
| Zadar (Croatia) | 90–83 | (Greece) Sato Aris |

- Day 7 (January 18, 1994)

| Team 1 | Score | Team 2 |
|---|---|---|
| Sato Aris (Greece) | 83–71 | (Bulgaria) Levski Sofia |

- Day 8 (January 25, 1994)

| Team 1 | Score | Team 2 |
|---|---|---|
| Hapoel Galil Elyon (Israel) | 89–88 | (Greece) Sato Aris |

- Day 9 (February 1, 1994)

| Team 1 | Score | Team 2 |
|---|---|---|
| Sato Aris (Greece) | 92–83 | (France) Pitch Cholet |

- Day 10 (February 8, 1994)

| Team 1 | Score | Team 2 |
|---|---|---|
| Ovarense (Portugal) | 87–103 | (Greece) Sato Aris |

- Group B standings:

| Pos. | Team | Pld. | Pts. | W | L | PF | PA | PD | Tie-break |
|---|---|---|---|---|---|---|---|---|---|
| 1. | (France) Pitch Cholet | 10 | 17 | 7 | 3 | 929 | 861 | +68 | 3–1 |
| 2. | (Greece) Sato Aris | 10 | 17 | 7 | 3 | 940 | 883 | +57 | 2–2 |
| 3. | (Israel) Hapoel Galil Elyon | 10 | 17 | 7 | 3 | 907 | 864 | +43 | 1–3 |
| 4. | (Portugal) Ovarense | 10 | 15 | 5 | 5 | 905 | 895 | +10 | |
| 5. | (Croatia) Zadar | 10 | 13 | 3 | 7 | 897 | 894 | +3 | |
| 6. | (Bulgaria) Levski Sofia | 10 | 11 | 1 | 9 | 827 | 1008 | -181 | |

==== Semifinals ====
- Best-of-3 playoff: Game 1 at home on February 17, 1994 / Game 2 away on February 22, 1994 / Game 3 away on February 24, 1994.

| Team 1 | Agg. | Team 2 | 1st leg | 2nd leg | 3rd leg |
|---|---|---|---|---|---|
| Sato Aris (Greece) | 1–2 | (Slovenia) Smelt Olimpija | 83–79* | 78–84 | 61–74 |

^{*}Overtime at the end of regulation (69–69).

=== 1994–95 FIBA Korać Cup, 3rd–tier ===
The 1994–95 FIBA Korać Cup was the 24th installment of the European 3rd-tier level professional basketball club competition FIBA Korać Cup, running from September 7, 1994, to March 15, 1995. The trophy was won by Alba Berlin, who defeated Stefanel Milano by a result of 172–166 in a two-legged final on a home and away basis. Overall, Aris Intersalonica achieved in present competition a record of 2 wins against 2 defeats, in three successive rounds. More detailed:

==== First round ====
- Bye

==== Second round ====
- Tie played on September 28, 1994, and on October 5, 1994.

| Team 1 | Agg. | Team 2 | 1st leg | 2nd leg |
|---|---|---|---|---|
| Polonia Przemyśl (Poland) | 165–169 | (Greece) Aris Intersalonica | 75–81 | 90–88 |

==== Third round ====
- Tie played on October 26, 1994, and on November 2, 1994.

| Team 1 | Agg. | Team 2 | 1st leg | 2nd leg |
|---|---|---|---|---|
| Dynamo Moscow (Russia) | 185–183 | (Greece) Aris Intersalonica | 99–94 | 86–89 |

=== 1995–96 FIBA Korać Cup, 3rd–tier ===
The 1995–96 FIBA Korać Cup was the 25th installment of the European 3rd-tier level professional basketball club competition FIBA Korać Cup, running from September 6, 1995, to March 13, 1996. The trophy was won by Efes Pilsen, who defeated Stefanel Milano by a result of 146–145 in a two-legged final on a home and away basis. Overall, Aris Moda Bagno achieved in present competition a record of 6 wins against 4 defeats, in four successive rounds. More detailed:

==== First round ====
- Bye

==== Second round ====
- Tie played on September 27, 1995, and on October 4, 1995.

| Team 1 | Agg. | Team 2 | 1st leg | 2nd leg |
|---|---|---|---|---|
| MOL Szolnoki Olaj (Hungary) | 136–172 | (Greece) Aris Moda Bagno | 64–66 | 72–106 |

==== Third round ====
- Tie played on October 25, 1995, and on October 31, 1995.

| Team 1 | Agg. | Team 2 | 1st leg | 2nd leg |
|---|---|---|---|---|
| Stal Bobrek (Poland) | 131–148 | (Greece) Aris Moda Bagno | 80–54 | 51–94 |

==== Top 16 ====
- Day 1 (November 22, 1995)

| Team 1 | Score | Team 2 |
|---|---|---|
| Aris Moda Bagno (Greece) | 81–79 | (Germany) Alba Berlin |

- Day 2 (November 29, 1995)

| Team 1 | Score | Team 2 |
|---|---|---|
| Amway Zaragoza (Spain) | 89–84 | (Greece) Aris Moda Bagno |

- Day 3 (December 6, 1995)

| Team 1 | Score | Team 2 |
|---|---|---|
| Aris Moda Bagno (Greece) | 83–60 | (Italy) Teamsystem Bologna |

- Day 4 (December 13, 1995)

| Team 1 | Score | Team 2 |
|---|---|---|
| Alba Berlin (Germany) | 104–86 | (Greece) Aris Moda Bagno |

- Day 5 (December 20, 1995)

| Team 1 | Score | Team 2 |
|---|---|---|
| Aris Moda Bagno (Greece) | 81–70 | (Spain) Amway Zaragoza |

- Day 6 (January 3, 1996)

| Team 1 | Score | Team 2 |
|---|---|---|
| Teamsystem Bologna (Italy) | 88–84 | (Greece) Aris Moda Bagno |

- Group C standings:

| Pos. | Team | Pld. | Pts. | W | L | PF | PA | PD | Tie-break |
|---|---|---|---|---|---|---|---|---|---|
| 1. | (Italy) Teamsystem Bologna | 6 | 10 | 4 | 2 | 486 | 489 | -3 | 1–1 (+14) |
| 2. | (Germany) Alba Berlin | 6 | 10 | 4 | 2 | 538 | 525 | +13 | 1–1 (-14) |
| 3. | (Greece) Aris Moda Bagno | 6 | 9 | 3 | 3 | 499 | 490 | +9 | |
| 4. | (Spain) Amway Zaragoza | 6 | 7 | 1 | 5 | 495 | 514 | -19 | |

=== 1996–97 FIBA Korać Cup, 3rd–tier ===
The 1996–97 FIBA Korać Cup was the 26th installment of the European 3rd-tier level professional basketball club competition FIBA Korać Cup, running from September 11, 1996, to April 3, 1997. The trophy was won by Aris, who defeated Tofaş by a result of 154–147 in a two-legged final on a home and away basis. Overall, Aris achieved in present competition a record of 12 wins against 4 defeats, in seven successive rounds. More detailed:

==== First round ====
- Bye

==== Second round ====
- Day 1 (October 2, 1996)

| Team 1 | Score | Team 2 |
|---|---|---|
| USK Erpet Praha (Czech Republic) | 88–90 | (Greece) Aris |

- Day 2 (October 9, 1996)

| Team 1 | Score | Team 2 |
|---|---|---|
| Satex Maribor (Slovenia) | 70–75 | (Greece) Aris |

- Day 3 (October 16, 1996)

| Team 1 | Score | Team 2 |
|---|---|---|
| Aris (Greece) | 74–67 | (Croatia) Olimpija Slavoning |

- Day 4 (November 6, 1996)

| Team 1 | Score | Team 2 |
|---|---|---|
| Aris (Greece) | 77–65 | (Czech Republic) USK Erpet Praha |

- Day 5 (November 13, 1996)

| Team 1 | Score | Team 2 |
|---|---|---|
| Aris (Greece) | 77–55 | (Slovenia) Satex Maribor |

- Day 6 (November 20, 1996)

| Team 1 | Score | Team 2 |
|---|---|---|
| Olimpija Slavoning (Croatia) | 71–74 | (Greece) Aris |

- Group A standings:

| Pos. | Team | Pld. | Pts. | W | L | PF | PA | PD | Tie-break |
|---|---|---|---|---|---|---|---|---|---|
| 1. | (Greece) Aris | 6 | 12 | 6 | 0 | 467 | 416 | +51 | |
| 2. | (Slovenia) Satex Maribor | 6 | 8 | 2 | 4 | 470 | 484 | -14 | 2–2 (+13) |
| 3. | (Czech Republic) USK Erpet Praha | 6 | 8 | 2 | 4 | 478 | 493 | -15 | 2–2 (+5) |
| 4. | (Croatia) Olimpija Slavoning | 6 | 8 | 2 | 4 | 468 | 490 | -22 | 2–2 (-18) |

==== Third round ====
- Tie played on December 4, 1996, and on December 11, 1996.

| Team 1 | Agg. | Team 2 | 1st leg | 2nd leg |
|---|---|---|---|---|
| Beşiktaş (Turkey) | 128–142 | (Greece) Aris | 64–65 | 64–77* |

^{*}Game played on January 7, 1997. The original second leg played on December 11, 1996, was abandoned after a massive brawl between Greek and Turkish players.

==== Top 16 ====
- Tie played on January 15, 1997, and on January 22, 1997.

| Team 1 | Agg. | Team 2 | 1st leg | 2nd leg |
|---|---|---|---|---|
| Aris (Greece) | 141–138 | (Federal Republic of Yugoslavia) Beobanka | 80–68 | 61–70 |

==== Quarterfinals ====
- Tie played on February 12, 1997, and on February 19, 1997.

| Team 1 | Agg. | Team 2 | 1st leg | 2nd leg |
|---|---|---|---|---|
| Aris (Greece) | 139–136 | (Greece) Peristeri Radio Korasidi | 75–65 | 64–71 |

==== Semifinals ====
- Tie played on March 5, 1997, and on March 12, 1997.

| Team 1 | Agg. | Team 2 | 1st leg | 2nd leg |
|---|---|---|---|---|
| Aris (Greece) | 163–160 | (Italy) Benetton Treviso | 77–73 | 86–87* |

^{*}The score in the second leg at the end of regulation was 72–68 for Benetton Treviso, so it was necessary to play an extra-time to decide the winner of this match.

==== Finals ====
- Tie played on March 26, 1997, at Alexandreio Melathron in Thessaloniki, Greece and on April 3, 1997, at Bursa Atatürk Spor Salonu in Bursa, Turkey.

| Team 1 | Agg. | Team 2 | 1st leg | 2nd leg |
|---|---|---|---|---|
| Aris (Greece) | 154–147 | (Turkey) Tofaş | 66–77 | 88–70 |

== European competitions ==
| Record | Round | Opponent club | | | |
|---|---|---|---|---|---|
1997–98 FIBA Korać Cup 3rd–tier
| 8–4 | 1st round | Bye | Aris qualified without games | | |
| 8–4 | 2nd round | (Slovenia) ZM Maribor Ovni | 71–53 (a) | 94–59 (h) | |
| 8–4 | 2nd round | (Germany) Trier | 95–55 (h) | 70–81 (a) | |
| 8–4 | 2nd round | (Hungary) Falco Szombathely | 101–62 (h) | 97–81 (a) | |
| 8–4 | 3rd round | (Spain) TDK Manresa | 67–84 (a) | 96–74 (h) | |
| 8–4 | Top 16 | (Latvia) Ventspils | 102–66 (h) | 73–67 (a) | |
| 8–4 | QF | (Italy) Calze Pompea Roma | 79–80 (h) | 79–86 (a) | |
1998–99 FIBA Saporta Cup 2nd–tier
| 12–6 | 1st round | (Sweden) Planja | 92–60 (h) | 103–80 (a) | |
| 12–6 | 1st round | (Bosnia and Herzegovina) Feal Široki | 89–53 (a) | 67–57 (h) | |
| 12–6 | 1st round | (France) Limoges | 55–57 (h) | 79–73 (a) | |
| 12–6 | 1st round | (Germany) Trier | 85–65 (a) | 86–71 (h) | |
| 12–6 | 1st round | (Belgium) Racing Antwerpen | 82–62 (h) | 61–59 (a) | |
| 12–6 | 2nd round | (Lithuania) Lietuvos Rytas | 76–77 (a) | 85–72 (h) | |
| 12–6 | Top 16 | (Latvia) Ventspils | 65–73 (a) | 79–64 (h) | |
| 12–6 | QF | (Slovenia) Pivovarna Laško | 95–72 (h) | 63–72 (a) | |
| 12–6 | SF | (Spain) Pamesa Valencia | 64–70 (a) | 50–58 (h) | |
1999–00 FIBA Korać Cup 3rd–tier
| 4–4 | 1st round | Bye | Aris qualified without games | | |
| 4–4 | 2nd round | (Bulgaria) Levski Sofia | 87–79 (h) | 77–74 (a) | |
| 4–4 | 2nd round | (Cyprus) Apollon Limassol | 94–64 (h) | 73–88 (a) | |
| 4–4 | 2nd round | (Federal Republic of Yugoslavia) FMP | FMP withdrew without games | | |
| 4–4 | 3rd round | (Belgium) Sunair Oostende | 65–75 (a) | 87–71 (h) | |
| 4–4 | Top 16 | (Turkey) Türk Telekom | 59–82 (a) | 62–73 (h) | |
2000–01 FIBA Saporta Cup 2nd–tier
| 6–6 | 1st round | (Turkey) Beşiktaş | 101–87 (a) | 101–98 (h) | |
| 6–6 | 1st round | (Russia) UNICS | 75–73 (h) | 61–93 (a) | |
| 6–6 | 1st round | (Croatia) Zagreb | 20–00 (a) | 20–00 (h) | |
| 6–6 | 1st round | (Portugal) Porto | 66–81 (h) | 73–74 (a) | |
| 6–6 | 1st round | (Germany) Arkadia Traiskirchen Lions | 112–96 (h) | 90–57 (a) | |
| 6–6 | Top 16 | (Greece) Maroussi | 76–88 (h) | 00–20 (a) | |
2002–03 FIBA Europe Champions Cup 4th–tier
| 14–6 | Qualifying round | (Israel) Bnei Herzliya | 75–78 (h) | 101–92 (a) | |
| 14–6 | Qualifying round | (Greece) Maroussi Telestet | 78–90 (a) | 87–78 (h) | |
| 14–6 | Qualifying round | (Cyprus) Keravnos Keo | 83–67 (h) | 69–61 (a) | |
| 14–6 | Qualifying round | (Croatia) Split CO | 97–79 (a) | 111–88 (h) | |
| 14–6 | Final stage | (Greece) Peristeri | 86–84; January 15, Armeets Arena, Sofia | | |
| 14–6 | Final stage | (Bulgaria) Lukoil Academic | 80–81; January 17, Armeets Arena, Sofia | | |
| 14–6 | Top 24 | (France) Strasbourg | 93–87 (h) | 83–103 (a) | |
| 14–6 | Top 24 | (Russia) Khimki | 79–75 (a) | 83–80 (h) | |
| 14–6 | Top 24 | (Israel) Hapoel Tel Aviv | 96–84 (h) | 71–75 (a) | |
| 14–6 | QF | (Bulgaria) Lukoil Academic | 91–73 (h) | 67–77 (a) | |
| 14–6 | SF | (Serbia and Montenegro) Hemofarm | 73–66; May 2, Alexandreio Melathron, Thessaloniki | | |
| 14–6 | F | (Poland) Prokom Trefl Sopot | 84–83; May 4, Alexandreio Melathron, Thessaloniki | | |
2003–04 FIBA Europe League 3rd–tier
| 12–7 | Group stage | (Finland) Honka Playboys | 77–73 (a) | 97–60 (h) | |
| 12–7 | Group stage | (Ukraine) Kyiv | 74–53 (h) | 75–74 (a) | |
| 12–7 | Group stage | (Israel) Hapoel Tel Aviv | 64–71 (a) | 78–67 (h) | |
| 12–7 | Group stage | (Russia) Ural Great Perm | 76–86 (h) | 93–98 (a) | |
| 12–7 | Group stage | (Latvia) Skonto | 88–51 (h) | 107–98 (a) | |
| 12–7 | Group stage | (Germany) GHP Bamberg | 64–78 (a) | 92–81 (h) | |
| 12–7 | Group stage | (Poland) Polonia Warbud | 75–90 (a) | 111–92 (h) | |
| 12–7 | Top 16 | (Poland) Anwil Włocławek | 96–85 (a) | 98–92 (h) | |
| 12–7 | QF | (Greece) Maroussi TIM | 76–85 (a) | 101–93 (h) | 90–99 (a) |
2004–05 ULEB Cup 2nd–tier
| 7–5 | Regular season | (Bulgaria) Lukoil Academic | 91–75 (a) | 91–75 (h) | |
| 7–5 | Regular season | (Turkey) Türk Telekom | 97–58 (h) | 87–78 (a) | |
| 7–5 | Regular season | (Italy) Vertical Vision Cantù | 99–77 (h) | 73–86 (a) | |
| 7–5 | Regular season | (Serbia and Montenegro) Reflex FMP | 77–88 (a) | 76–73 (h) | |
| 7–5 | Regular season | (Russia) Dynamo Moscow | 80–95 (h) | 77–84 (a) | |
| 7–5 | Top 16 | (Lithuania) Lietuvos Rytas | 77–75 (h) | 77–81 (a) | |
2005–06 ULEB Cup 2nd–tier
| 12–5 | Regular season | (Germany) Alba Berlin | 89–86 (a) | 97–80 (h) | |
| 12–5 | Regular season | (Belgium) Eyphony Bree | 81–74 (h) | 64–69 (a) | |
| 12–5 | Regular season | (Latvia) Ventspils | 76–96 (a) | 96–78 (h) | |
| 12–5 | Regular season | (Spain) Adecco Estudiantes | 89–76 (a) | 73–69 (h) | |
| 12–5 | Regular season | (Bulgaria) Lukoil Academic | 97–91 (h) | 65–66 (a) | |
| 12–5 | Top 16 | (Greece) Panionios Forthnet | 72–70 (a) | 112–105 (h) | |
| 12–5 | QF | (France) Adecco ASVEL | 67–60 (a) | 77–67 (h) | |
| 12–5 | SF | (Serbia and Montenegro) Hemofarm | 71–74 (a) | 82–77 (h) | |
| 12–5 | F | (Russia) Dynamo Moscow | 60–73; April 11, Spiroudome, Charleroi | | |
2006–07 Euroleague 1st–tier
| 7–13 | Regular season | (Turkey) Fenerbahçe Ülker | 66–58 (h) | 86–80 (a) | |
| 7–13 | Regular season | (Russia) CSKA Moscow | 68–83 (a) | 62–65 (h) | |
| 7–13 | Regular season | (Italy) Eldo Napoli | 69–71 (a) | 80–72 (h) | |
| 7–13 | Regular season | (France) Pau-Orthez | 74–72 (h) | 62–77 (a) | |
| 7–13 | Regular season | (Italy) Benetton Treviso | 42–64 (a) | 65–60 (h) | |
| 7–13 | Regular season | (Lithuania) Žalgiris | 73–66 (h) | 66–77 (a) | |
| 7–13 | Regular season | (Spain) Winterthur FC Barcelona | 83–86 (a) | 75–82 (h) | |
| 7–13 | Top 16 | (Russia) Dynamo Moscow | 74–86 (h) | 69–71 (a) | |
| 7–13 | Top 16 | (Spain) Unicaja | 74–76 (a) | 83–65 (h) | |
| 7–13 | Top 16 | (Italy) Benetton Treviso | 79–80 (h) | 72–83 (a) | |
2007–08 Euroleague 1st–tier
| 9–11 | Regular season | (Spain) Unicaja | 87–83 (h) | 52–73 (a) | |
| 9–11 | Regular season | (France) Le Mans | 69–66 (a) | 93–74 (h) | |
| 9–11 | Regular season | (Croatia) Cibona VIP | 77–73 (h) | 83–76 (a) | |
| 9–11 | Regular season | (Lithuania) Lietuvos Rytas | 70–77 (a) | 69–72 (h) | |
| 9–11 | Regular season | (Italy) Armani Jeans Milano | 70–77 (h) | 69–77 (a) | |
| 9–11 | Regular season | (Turkey) Efes Pilsen | 67–64 (h) | 84–74 (a) | |
| 9–11 | Regular season | (Israel) Maccabi Tel Aviv | 70–85 (a) | 94–101 (h) | |
| 9–11 | Top 16 | (Turkey) Fenerbahçe Ülker | 88–96 (h) | 60–59 (a) | |
| 9–11 | Top 16 | (Lithuania) Lietuvos Rytas | 74–89 (a) | 83–74 (h) | |
| 9–11 | Top 16 | (Spain) TAU Cerámica | 69–87 (h) | 74–90 (a) | |
2008–09 Eurocup 2nd–tier
| 3–3 | Regular season | (Greece) Panellinios | 71–69 (a) | 72–77 (h) | |
| 3–3 | Regular season | (Israel) Bnei Herzliya | 84–71 (h) | 86–89 (a) | |
| 3–3 | Regular season | (Turkey) Türk Telekom | 79–75 (h) | 65–78 (a) | |
2009–10 Euroleague 1st–tier
| 1–1 | Qualifying round | (Greece) Maroussi | 69–67 (h) | 60–89 (a) | |
2009–10 Eurocup 2nd–tier
| 8–6 | Regular season | (Croatia) Zadar | 73–68 (a) | 73–67 (h) | |
| 8–6 | Regular season | (Israel) Hapoel Migdal | 81–77 (h) | 89–79 (a) | |
| 8–6 | Regular season | (Lithuania) Šiauliai | 91–92 (a) | 85–67 (h) | |
| 8–6 | Top 16 | (Spain) DKV Joventut | 72–74 (a) | 84–54 (h) | |
| 8–6 | Top 16 | (France) Le Mans | 71–72 (h) | 75–79 (a) | |
| 8–6 | Top 16 | (Germany) Alba Berlin | 65–61 (a) | 80–67 (h) | |
| 8–6 | QF | (Spain) Power Electronics Valencia | 64–71 (h) | 67–85 (a) | |
2010–11 Eurocup 2nd–tier
| 8–6 | Qualifying round | (Bulgaria) Lukoil Academic | 78–74 (a) | 92–93 (h) | |
| 8–6 | Regular season | (Ukraine) Azovmash | 88–75 (h) | 82–77 (a) | |
| 8–6 | Regular season | (Israel) Hapoel Gilboa Galil | 92–83 (a) | 91–70 (h) | |
| 8–6 | Regular season | (Croatia) Cedevita | 76–81 (a) | 85–76 (h) | |
| 8–6 | Top 16 | (Ukraine) Budivelnyk | 85–69 (h) | 78–73 (a) | |
| 8–6 | Top 16 | (France) Le Mans | 70–85 (a) | 73–78 (h) | |
| 8–6 | Top 16 | (Germany) Göttingen | 82–84 (h) | 55–74 (a) | |
2011–12 Eurocup 2nd–tier
| 5–7 | Regular season | (Czech Republic) ČEZ Nymburk | 55–64 (h) | 72–78 (a) | |
| 5–7 | Regular season | (Lithuania) Rūdupis Prienai | 71–60 (a) | 96–86 (h) | |
| 5–7 | Regular season | (Netherlands) GasTerra Flames | 58–51 (a) | 79–58 (h) | |
| 5–7 | Top 16 | (Russia) Khimki | 48–73 (h) | 72–88 (a) | |
| 5–7 | Top 16 | (Ukraine) Donetsk | 74–81 (a) | 66–77 (h) | |
| 5–7 | Top 16 | (France) ASVEL | 77–60 (h) | 52–79 (a) | |
2015–16 Eurocup 2nd–tier
| 10–6 | Regular season | (Turkey) Trabzonspor Medical Park | 71–74 (a) | 78–70 (h) | |
| 10–6 | Regular season | (Montenegro) Budućnost VOLI | 75–57 (h) | 56–75 (a) | |
| 10–6 | Regular season | (Russia) UNICS | 74–73 (a) | 76–70 (h) | |
| 10–6 | Regular season | (Romania) Steaua CSM EximBank | 70–66 (h) | 77–67 (a) | |
| 10–6 | Regular season | (Turkey) Banvit | 84–96 (a) | 72–53 (h) | |
| 10–6 | Top 32 | (Lithuania) Neptūnas | 84–58 (h) | 68–72 (a) | |
| 10–6 | Top 32 | (Italy) EA7 Emporio Armani Milano | 54–95 (a) | 83–68 (h) | |
| 10–6 | Top 32 | (Germany) Alba Berlin | 67–82 (a) | 73–63 (h) | |
2017–18 Champions League 3rd–tier
| 4–10 | Regular season | (Turkey) Beşiktaş Sompo Japan | 65–72 (h) | 61–83 (a) | |
| 4–10 | Regular season | (Czech Republic) ČEZ Nymburk | 65–71 (h) | 70–99 (a) | |
| 4–10 | Regular season | (France) Nanterre 92 | 70–62 (h) | 63–91 (a) | |
| 4–10 | Regular season | (Poland) Stelmet Enea Zielona Góra | 70–64 (h) | 80–72 (a) | |
| 4–10 | Regular season | (Italy) Sidigas Scandone | 59–56 (h) | 66–79 (a) | |
| 4–10 | Regular season | (Belgium) Oostende | 66–70 (h) | 67–69 (a) | |
| 4–10 | Regular season | (Germany) Telekom Baskets Bonn | 69–75 (h) | 59–76 (a) | |
2018–19 Champions League 3rd–tier
| 3–1 | First qualifying round | (Georgia (country)) Dinamo Tbilisi | 90–64 (a) | 92–54 (h) | 182–118 |
| 3–1 | Second qualifying round | (Russia) Nizhny Novgorod | 65–63 (a) | 51–62 (h) | 116–125 |
2018–19 FIBA Europe Cup 4th–tier
| 3–3 | Regular season | (Bulgaria) Levski Sofia | 81–76 (h) | 66–77 (a) | |
| 3–3 | Regular season | (Finland) Kataja | 70–79 (h) | 86–88 (a) | |
| 3–3 | Regular season | (Ukraine) Dnipro | 86–61 (h) | 55–51 (a) | |
2022–23 FIBA Europe Cup 4th–tier
| 0–1 | Qualifying round | (Lithuania) Wolves | 72–83; Samokov, Bulgaria | | |
2023–24 EuroCup 2nd–tier
| 9–10 | Regular season | (Lithuania) 7bet-Lietkabelis | 69–60 (h) | 74–84 (a) | |
| 9–10 | Regular season | (Montenegro) Budućnost VOLI | 76–75 (h) | 65–63 (a) | |
| 9–10 | Regular season | (Italy) Dolomiti Energia Trento | 84–77 (h) | 67–69 (a) | |
| 9–10 | Regular season | (Spain) Dreamland Gran Canaria | 66–82 (h) | 65–93 (a) | |
| 9–10 | Regular season | (France) Mincidelice JL Bourg | 68–76 (h) | 65–72 (a) | |
| 9–10 | Regular season | (Germany) ratiopharm Ulm | 88–99 (h) | 86–66 (a) | |
| 9–10 | Regular season | (Poland) Śląsk Wrocław | 93–71 (h) | 80–63 (a) | |
| 9–10 | Regular season | (Turkey) Türk Telekom | 68–66 (h) | 95–85 (a) | |
| 9–10 | Regular season | (Romania) U-BT Cluj-Napoca | 59–61 (h) | 74–90 (a) | |
| 9–10 | Eightfinals | (Ukraine) Prometey | 67–95 (a) | | |
2024–25 EuroCup 2nd–tier
| 3–15 | Regular season | (Lithuania) 7bet-Lietkabelis | 81–66 (h) | 92–74 (a) | |
| 3–15 | Regular season | (Slovenia) Cedevita Olimpija | 75–82 (h) | 79–98 (a) | |
| 3–15 | Regular season | (France) Cosea JL Bourg | 51–92 (h) | 91–88 (a) | |
| 3–15 | Regular season | (Israel) Hapoel Bank Yahav Jerusalem | 68–78 (h) | 85–90 (a) | |
| 3–15 | Regular season | (Turkey) Türk Telekom | 63–68 (h) | 77–87 (a) | |
| 3–15 | Regular season | (Romania) U-BT Cluj-Napoca | 74–89 (h) | 79–87 (a) | |
| 3–15 | Regular season | (Italy) Umana Reyer Venezia | 74–81 (h) | 75–95 (a) | |
| 3–15 | Regular season | (Germany) Veolia Towers Hamburg | 88–90 (h) | 69–93 (a) | |
| 3–15 | Regular season | (Spain) Valencia Basket | 59–63 (h) | 65–106 (a) | |

== Record ==
Aris has overall from 1966 to 1967 (first participation) to 2018–19 (last participation): 270 wins and 1 draw against 188 defeats in 459 games for all European club competitions.

- (1st–tier) FIBA European Champions Cup or FIBA European League & EuroLeague: 81–62 in 143 games.
- (2nd–tier) FIBA European Cup Winner's Cup or FIBA European Cup or FIBA Saporta Cup: 46–20 in 66 games.
- (2nd–tier) ULEB Cup or EuroCup: 56–41 in 97 games.
- (2nd–tier) FIBA Champions League: 16–1–19 in 36 games.
- (3rd–tier) FIBA Korać Cup: 48–34 in 82 games.
- (3rd–tier) FIBA Europe League: 12–7 in 19 games.
- (4th–tier) FIBA Europe Champions Cup: 14–6 in 20 games.

FIBA Europe Cup: 3–3 in 6 games.

== See also ==
- Greek basketball clubs in international competitions
