= Žarko Đurišić =

Montenegrin-Slovenian basketball player

Minnesota Timberwolves
- Title: Director of international player personnel
- League: NBA

Personal information
- Born: March 31, 1961 (age 65) Titograd, PR Montenegro, FPR Yugoslavia
- Listed height: 2.08 m (6 ft 10 in)

Career information
- College: Wichita State (1980–1984)
- NBA draft: 1984: undrafted
- Playing career: 1978–1995
- Position: Center
- Number: 12, 15
- Coaching career: 1996–1996

Career history

Playing
- 1978–1980: Crvena zvezda
- 1984–1985: Budućnost
- 1985–1995: Smelt Olimpija

Coaching
- 1996: Smelt Olimpija

Career highlights
- As player: Saporta Cup winner (1994); 4x Slovenian League champion (1992–1995); 4x Slovenian Cup winner (1992–1995); As coach: Slovenian League champion (1996)
Medals
Men's basketball
Representing Yugoslavia
European Championship for Juniors
Silver medal – second place	1980 Yugoslavia	U18 Team
European Championship for Cadets
Silver medal – second place	1977 France	U16 Team

Žarko Đurišić (Serbian Cyrillic: Жарко Ђуришић; born March 31, 1961), also credited as Zarko Durisic, is a Montenegrin-born Slovenian basketball scout, former player, and former coach who is currently the Director of international player personnel for the Minnesota Timberwolves of the National Basketball Association (NBA).

== Playing career ==
Đurišić started his basketball career playing with the youth teams of Budućnost. In 1978, at age of 17, he moved to Crvena zvezda of the Yugoslav Federal League. He played two seasons there, until 1980. Over 44 regular season games, he averaged 2.5 point per game.

In 1980, Đurišić moved to the United States to play college basketball at Wichita State University where his four seasons in the NCAA Division I with the Shockers were very successful. Arriving to Wichita together with compatriot Zoran Radović, Đurišić joined the squad featuring future NBA players Cliff Levingston, Antoine Carr, Xavier McDaniel and Ozell Jones as the sixth-seeded Wichita State team came within one game of making it to the Final Four, losing the Midwest regional final to first regional seed Louisiana State University.

After finishing college career he went back to the Yugoslav League where he played for Budućnost and Smelt Olimpija. With Olimpija he also played Premier A Slovenian League after 1992.

== National team career ==
=== Yugoslavia national team ===
Đurišić was a member of the Yugoslavia national cadet team that won the silver medal at the 1977 European Championship for Cadets. Over three tournament games, he averaged 4.7 points per game. He also was a member of the Yugoslavia national junior team that participated at the 1979 World Championship for Juniors and also won the silver medal at the 1980 European Championship for Juniors.

=== Slovenia national team ===
Đurišić was a member of the Slovenia national team that participated at the EuroBasket 1993. Over three tournament games, he averaged 4.7 points per game. Slovenia took 14th place at the tournament. He played 27 games for the national team.

== Post-playing career ==
Đurišić briefly coached Smelt Olimpija during the 1995–96 season. He took over the team's coaching reigns from Zmago Sagadin in January 2016, leading them to the Slovenian League title at the end of the season.

Since summer 1996, Đurišić has been affiliated with the Minnesota Timberwolves organization where he heads up the team's international scouting efforts. Positions he previously held with the Wolves include director of college and international player personnel, director of player personnel, and head scout.

== Personal life ==
Đurišić and his wife, Tatjana, have two daughters: Jelena and Aleksandra. Daughter Jelena (born 1989 in Belgrade) is a Slovenian former tennis player.

== Career achievements and awards ==
Player

- European Cup winner: 1 (with Smelt Olimpija: 1993–94)
- Premier A Slovenian League champion: 4 (with Smelt Olimpija: 1991–92, 1992–93, 1993–94, 1994–95)
- Yugoslav Cup winner: 4 (with Smelt Olimpija: 1992, 1993, 1994, 1995)

Coach

- Premier A Slovenian League champion: 1 (with Smelt Olimpija: 1995–96)
