= Boris Gorenc =

Slovenian basketball player

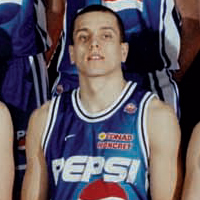
- Gorenc, in 1997.

Personal information
- Born: 3 December 1973 (age 52) Ljubljana, SFR Yugoslavia
- Listed height: 6 ft 6 in (1.98 m)
- Listed weight: 212 lb (96 kg)

Career information
- Playing career: 1990–2008
- Position: Shooting guard / small forward

Career history
- 1990–1996: Olimpija Ljubljana
- 1996–1997: Strasbourg
- 1997–1998: Pau-Orthez
- 1998–1999: Rimini
- 1999–2000: Virtus Bologna
- 2000: Reggiana
- 2000: Andrea Costa Imola
- 2000–2002: Mens Sana Siena
- 2002–2003: Varese
- 2003–2004: Olympiacos
- 2004–2005: Snaidero Udine
- 2005: Olympiacos
- 2005–2007: Khimki
- 2007–2008: Olimpija Ljubljana

Career highlights
- 5× Slovenian League Champion (1992–1996); 4× Slovenian Cup Winner (1992–1995); 2× FIBA Saporta Cup Champion (1994, 2002); FIBA Europe U20 Championship MVP (1994); 4× Slovenian League All-Star (1993–1996); Slovenian League All-Star MVP (1994); 2× Slovenian League All-Star Slam Dunk Winner (1993, 1996); Italian League Top Scorer (2003)

Boris Gorenc (born 3 December 1973) is a former Slovenian professional basketball player, and basketball agent.

== Professional career ==
Gorenc started playing basketball in KK Domžale, before in 1990 he joined KK Olimpija. He had been member Olimpija until 1996, and help team winning five times national championship and Saporta Cup. He moved to France in summer 1996, signed with Strasbourg IG. In 1997, he was invited to train with Chicago Bulls for two months and already signed with them, before he injured knees. He returned to France, signed with Pau-Orthez. However, in January he was released and signed with Pepsi Rimini, where he also played season 1998–1999. In January 2000, he signed with Bipop-Carire R.Emilia. Before season 2000–2001 he signed with Lineltex Imola, but in October he signed with Montepaschi Siena. He stayed in Tuscany until 2002, when he signed with Metis Varese. In the 2003-04 season, he played Euroleague with Olympiacos. Gorenc that last time played for Italian team, Snaidero Cucine. In January he left Italy to re-join Olympiacos. From 2005 to 2007, he played in Russia for BC Khimki. In October 2007, he signed with Olimpija. After many injuries they reached mutual consent in March 2008. He officially announced his retirement in September 2008.

== National team career ==
Gorenc was a regular member of the senior Slovenian national basketball team, between 1992 and 2003. He competed in five EuroBaskets (1993, 1995, 1997, 2001, and 2003).

== Honors and awards ==
=== Olimpija ===
- 5× Slovenian League Champion: (1992, 1993, 1994, 1995, 1996)
- 4× Slovenian Cup Winner: (1992, 1993, 1994, 1995)
- FIBA European Cup Champion: (1994)

=== Siena ===
- FIBA Saporta Cup Champion: (2002)

=== Individual ===
- 1994 European Championship for Men 'Under22 and Under' MVP
- 4× Slovenian League All-Star: (1993, 1994, 1995, 1996)
- Slovenian League All-Star MVP: (1994)
- 2× Slovenian League All-Star Slam Dunk Winner: (1993, 1996)
- Italian League Top Scorer: (2003)

== Career statistics ==
Legend
| GP | Games played | GS | Games started | MPG | Minutes per game |
| FG% | Field-goal percentage | 3P% | 3-point field-goal percentage | FT% | Free-throw percentage |
| RPG | Rebounds per game | APG | Assists per game | SPG | Steals per game |
| BPG | Blocks per game | PPG | Points per game | PIR | Performance index rating |
| **Bold** | Career high |

=== EuroLeague ===
| Year | Team | GP | GS | MPG | FG% | 3P% | FT% | RPG | APG | SPG | BPG | PPG | PIR |
|---|---|---|---|---|---|---|---|---|---|---|---|---|---|
| 2003–04 | Olympiacos | **20** | **13** | 22.3 | **.500** | .281 | **.695** | 2.4 | 1.2 | .7 | .1 | 8.5 | 8.4 |
| 2004–05 | Olympiacos | 6 | 6 | **26.0** | .489 | **.471** | .526 | **3.7** | **3.7** | **1.0** | **.2** | **10.3** | **12.8** |
| 2007–08 | Union Olimpija | 4 | 4 | 24.9 | **.500** | .000 | .533 | 2.5 | 2.0 | — | — | 9.0 | 7.3 |
| Career | | 30 | 23 | 23.4 | .497 | .304 | .634 | 2.7 | 1.8 | .6 | .1 | 8.9 | 9.1 |
