= 1995–96 FIBA Korać Cup =

- League: FIBA Korać Cup
- Sport: Basketball

Finals
- Champions: (Turkey) Efes Pilsen
- Runners-up: (Italy) Stefanel Milano

FIBA Korać Cup seasons
- ← 1994–95 1996–97 →

The 1995–96 FIBA Korać Cup was the 25th edition of FIBA's Korać Cup basketball competition. The Turkish Efes Pilsen defeated the Italian Stefanel Milano in the final. This was the first time a Turkish team won the title.

== Controversy ==
Since Efes Pilsen's Istanbul Factory is in Bahçelievler district, the basketball team of Efes Pilsen is considered the team of Bahçelievler. Saffet Bulut, who was the mayor of Bahçelievler, promised Efes that if they brought the trophy to Turkey, he would erect a statue of the team's success in the most beautiful place in the district. After Efes Pilsen won the Korać Cup, the mayor decided to erect a statue symbolizing the victory. But the metropolitan municipality prevents the district municipality from erecting the statue. Two months later Saffet Bulut met with the Mayor of Istanbul, Recep Tayyip Erdoğan and asked him why the statue was removed. Erdoğan claimed that the statue was of a beer glass, hence an advertisement for Efes. The statue was erected later on and is now currently on Talat Pasha Boulevard.

== Country ranking ==
For the 1995–1996 FIBA European League, the countries are allocated places according to their place on the FIBA country rankings, which takes into account their performance in European competitions from 1992–93 to 1994–95.

Country ranking for 1995–1996 FIBA Korać Cup

| Rank | Country | 1992-93 | 1993-94 | 1994-95 | Average |
|---|---|---|---|---|---|
| 1 | Spain | 212 | 340 | 300 | 284,00 |
| 2 | Greece | 253 | 322 | 249,375 | 274,79 |
| 3 | Italy | 363 | 173 | 260 | 265,33 |
| 4 | France | 219 | 123 | 179 | 173,67 |
| 5 | Croatia | 62,86 | 70 | 68 | 66,95 |
| 6 | Turkey | 58,33 | 73 | 69 | 66,78 |
| 7 | Germany | 37 | 45 | 103 | 61,67 |
| 8 | Israel | 66 | 48 | 61 | 58,33 |
| 9 | Slovenia | 24 | 72,5 | 27,5 | 41,33 |
| 10 | Belgium | 51 | 37 | 24 | 37,33 |
| 11 | Russia | 12 | 10 | 59 | 27,00 |
| 12 | Portugal | 9 | 21 | 25,83 | 18,61 |
| 13 | Ukraine | 15,33 | 13 | 27 | 18,44 |
| 14 | Czech Republic | 13 | 13 | 11 | 12,33 |
| 15 | Hungary | 5,33 | 7,5 | 18 | 10,28 |
| 16 | Poland | 4,5 | 4 | 18,33 | 8,94 |
| 17 | Macedonia | 0 | 20 | 6 | 8,67 |
| 18 | Switzerland | 6 | 9 | 8,5 | 7,83 |
| 19 | Slovakia | 0 | 10 | 8,33 | 6,11 |
| 20 | Romania | 11 | 2 | 4,67 | 5,89 |
| 21 | Lithuania | 3 | 2 | 12 | 5,67 |
| 22 | Latvia | 6 | 2 | 9 | 5,67 |

| Rank | Country | 1992-93 | 1993-94 | 1994-95 | Average |
|---|---|---|---|---|---|
| 23 | Bulgaria | 7,5 | 5,67 | 1,33 | 4,83 |
| 24 | Cyprus | 5,33 | 5,33 | 3 | 4,55 |
| 25 | Austria | 1 | 6 | 4,67 | 3,89 |
| 26 | Luxembourg | 4 | 2 | 2 | 2,67 |
| 27 | Sweden | 0,37 | 1 | 6 | 2,46 |
| 28 | Finland | 3,5 | 1,67 | 2 | 2,39 |
| 29 | England | 0,67 | 4,17 | 2 | 2,28 |
| 30 | Netherlands | 1,67 | 2,33 | 2,5 | 2,17 |
| 31 | Georgia | 2 | 0 | 3,33 | 1,78 |
| 32 | Albania | 1 | 0,67 | 2 | 1,22 |
| 33 | Iceland | 0,33 | 2,5 | 0,2 | 1,01 |
| 34 | Estonia | 1 | 0,33 | 1,67 | 1,00 |
| 35 | Bosnia and Herzegovina | 0 | 0 | 2 | 0,67 |
| 36 | Belarus | 0,4 | 0,5 | 0 | 0,30 |
| 37 | Armenia | 0,4 | 0 | 0 | 0,13 |
| 38 | Moldova | 0 | 0,2 | 0,2 | 0,13 |
| 39 | Denmark | 0 | 0 | 0,2 | 0,07 |
| 40 | Ireland | 0 | 0,2 | 0 | 0,07 |
| 41 | Wales | 0 | 0,2 | 0 | 0,07 |
| 42 | Malta | 0,2 | 0 | 0 | 0,07 |
| 43 | Yugoslavia (banned) | 0 | 0 | 0 | 0 |

== Team allocation ==
The labels in the parentheses show how each team qualified for the place of its starting round:

- 1st, 2nd, 3rd, etc.: League position after Playoffs
- TH: Title holder
- WC: Wild card

Third round
| (Italy) Stefanel Milano (4th) | (Germany) Alba Berlin (2nd)^{TH} | | |
Second round
| (Spain) TDK Manresa (4th) | (Greece) Panionios Afisorama (5th) | (Belgium) Go Pass Verviers-Pepinster (4th) | (Israel) Hapoel Tel Aviv (4th) |
| (Spain) Amway Zaragoza (6th) | (Greece) Aris Moda Bagno (6th) | (Lithuania) Atletas (2nd) | (Russia) CSK VVS (3rd) |
| (Spain) Estudiantes Argentaria (7th) | (Greece) AEK (8th) | (Lithuania) Šilute (5th) | (Portugal) Beira Mar |
| (Spain) Festina Andorra (8th) | (Turkey) Fenerbahçe (2nd) | (Federal Republic of Yugoslavia) Borovica (2nd) | (Ukraine) Mykolaiv (5th) |
| (Italy) Teamsystem Fortitudo Bologna (3rd) | (Turkey) Efes Pilsen (3rd) | (Federal Republic of Yugoslavia) Vojvodina (6th) | |
| (Italy) Cagiva Varese (5th) | (Turkey) PTT (5th) | (France) Pitch Cholet (4th) | |
| (Italy) Scavolini Pesaro (6th) | (Belgium) Racing Antwerpen (3rd) | (Germany) SSV Brandt Hagen (4th) | |
First round
| Croatia Osiguranje Split (3rd) | (England) Manchester Giants (6th) | (Slovakia) Slovakofarma Pezinok (2nd) | (Ukraine) BIPA-Moda Odesa (4th) |
| (Croatia) Franck Dona (4th) | (England) Crystal Palace (WC) | (Slovakia) Chemosvit (3rd) | (Poland) Slask Wroclaw (6th) |
| (Croatia) Slavonska Banka Osijek (5th) | (Bosnia and Herzegovina) Bosna | (Slovakia) Ozeta Trenčín | (Poland) Stal Bobrek Bytom (7th) |
| (Croatia) Kantrida (6th) | (Bosnia and Herzegovina) Brotnjo | (Cyprus) AEK Larnaca (2nd) | (Lithuania) Šiauliai (4th) |
| (Slovenia) Kovinotehna Savinjska Polzela (2nd) | (Bosnia and Herzegovina) Cenex Sarajevo | (Cyprus) Keravnos (3rd) | (Lithuania) Savy Alytus (1st, LKAL)^{WC} |
| (Slovenia) Bavaria Wolltex Maribor (3rd) | (Bosnia and Herzegovina) Vitez | (Cyprus) Omonia | (Bulgaria) Slavia Sofia (2nd) |
| (Slovenia) Satex Maribor (4th) | (France) PSG Racing Basket (6th) | (Sweden) Astra Södertälje (3rd) | (Bulgaria) Ficosota Shumen |
| (Slovenia) Litostroj Slovan (5th) | (France) ASVEL (7th) | (Sweden) Plannja (4th) | (Federal Republic of Yugoslavia) Crvena Zvezda (3rd) |
| (Hungary) ZTE (2nd) | (France) JDA Dijon (8th) | (Sweden) Borås (WC) | (Federal Republic of Yugoslavia) BFC Beočin (4th) |
| (Hungary) MOL Szolnoki Olaj (3rd) | (Russia) Avtodorozhnik (4th) | (Germany) UniVersa Bamberg (3rd) | (Greece) Soulis Sporting (7th) |
| (Hungary) Albacomp Fehérvár (5th) | (Russia) Akvarius Volgograd (5th) | (Germany) Steiner Bayreuth (6th) | (Turkey) Tofaş (4th) |
| (Hungary) Atomerőmű (6th) | (Russia) Spartak Moscow (6th) | (Israel) Hapoel Holon (3rd) | (Luxembourg) Sparta Bertrange |
| (Austria) UKJ Möllersdorf Traiskirchen (2nd) | (Czech Republic) USK Trident Praha (3rd) | (Israel) Maccabi Rishon LeZion (5th) | (Albania) Vllaznia |
| (Austria) ABC Trodat Wels (3rd) | (Czech Republic) Sparta Praha (5th) | (Belgium) Spirou Charleroi (2nd) | (Belarus) Grodno-93 (1st) |
| (Austria) Einkaufswelt Fürstenfeld (4th) | (Czech Republic) Nova Hut Ostrava (6th) | (Belgium) Belgacom Union Mons-Hainaut (6th) | (Moldova) Floare |
| (Austria) Sparkasse Aflenz (5th) | (North Macedonia) MZT Skopje | (Portugal) Ovarense Aerosoles | (Denmark) Aarhus |
| (England) Worthing Bears (4th) | (North Macedonia) Nemetali Strumica | (Portugal) Oliveirense | |
| (England) London Towers (5th) | (North Macedonia) Žito Veles | (Ukraine) Shakhtar Donetsk (3rd) | |

Notes

1. Belgium: Basketball clubs Sobabee Antwerp and Racing Club Mechelen merged in 1995, creating new club Racing Basket Antwerpen which took Mechelen's place in the competition.

== First round ==
| Team 1 | Agg. | Team 2 | 1st leg | 2nd leg |
|---|---|---|---|---|
| Plannja (Sweden) | 160–174 | (Russia) Avtodorozhnik | 82–87 | 78–87 |
| Šiauliai (Lithuania) | 165–163 | (Poland) Slask Wroclaw | 100–88 | 65–75 |
| Möllersdorf Traiskirchen (Austria) | 142–196 | (Federal Republic of Yugoslavia) BFC Beočin | 75–87 | 67–109 |
| Brotnjo (Bosnia and Herzegovina) | 184–176 | (Austria) Sparkasse Aflenz | 88–79 | 96–97 |
| Ovarense Aerosoles (Portugal) | 148–168 | (Belgium) Spirou Charleroi | 82–82 | 66–86 |
| Nemetali Strumica (North Macedonia) | 116–149 | (Hungary) Atomerőmű | 63–71 | 53–78 |
| Ozeta Trenčín (Slovakia) | 127–164 | (Belgium) Belgacom Union Mons | 59–61 | 68–103 |
| Soulis Sporting (Greece) | 161–145 | (Cyprus) AEK Larnaca | 77–61 | 84–84 |
| Savy Alytus (Lithuania) | 40–0 | (Russia) Spartak Moscow | 20–0 | 20–0 |
| Floare (Moldova) | 132–150 | (Bulgaria) Ficosota Shumen | 71–65 | 61–85 |
| Vitez (Bosnia and Herzegovina) | 120–234 | (Croatia) Kantrida | 56–125 | 64–109 |
| Bosna (Bosnia and Herzegovina) | 0–40 | Croatia Osiguranje Split | 0–20 | 0–20 |
| Vllaznia (Albania) | 119–183 | (North Macedonia) Žito | 53–90 | 66–93 |
| Keravnos (Cyprus) | 185–192 | (Bulgaria) Slavia Sofia | 86–69 | 99–123 |
| Slovakofarma Pezinok (Slovakia) | 197–208 | (Denmark) Aarhus | 95–113 | 102–95 |
| BIPA-Moda Odesa (Ukraine) | 150–167 | (Israel) Maccabi Rishon LeZion | 87–78 | 63–89 |
| Kovinotehna Savinjska Polzela (Slovenia) | 164–146 | (Hungary) Albacomp Fehérvár | 90–72 | 74–74 |
| Slavonska Banka Osijek (Croatia) | 137–121 | (Slovakia) Chemosvit | 70–59 | 67–62 |
| Nova Hut Ostrava (Czech Republic) | 151–172 | (Germany) UniVersa Bamberg | 81–88 | 70–84 |
| Omonia (Cyprus) | 163–170 | (Israel) Hapoel Holon | 82–76 | 81–94 |
| ZTE (Hungary) | 158–173 | (Slovenia) Bavaria Wolltex | 63–83 | 95–90 |
| Akvarius Volgograd (Russia) | 150–145 | (Federal Republic of Yugoslavia) Crvena Zvezda | 74–67 | 76–78 |
| ASVEL (France) | 177–161 | (England) Manchester Giants | 83–76 | 94–85 |
| Einkaufswelt Fürstenfeld (Austria) | 167–155 | (Luxembourg) Sparta Bertrange | 90–72 | 77–83 |
| Grodno-93 (Belarus) | 128–168 | (Poland) Stal Bobrek Bytom | 73–83 | 55–83 |
| Shakhtar Donetsk (Ukraine) | 152–121 | (Sweden) Astra Södertälje | 66–41 | 86–80 |
| Cenex (Bosnia and Herzegovina) | 0–40 | (Hungary) MOL Szolnoki Olaj | 0–20 | 0–20 |
| MZT Skopje (North Macedonia) | 161–158 | (Croatia) Franck Dona | 81–64 | 80–94 |
| Borås (Sweden) | 154–149 | (England) Crystal Palace | 96–77 | 58–72 |
| Litostroj Slovan (Slovenia) | 157–171 | (Germany) Steiner Bayreuth | 86–83 | 71–88 |
| Satex Maribor (Slovenia) | 141–152 | (Turkey) Tofaş | 71–76 | 70–76 |
| London Towers (England) | 147–145 | (France) PSG Racing Basket | 68–57 | 79–88 |
| Oliveirense (Portugal) | 177–175 | (England) Worthing Bears | 92–75 | 85–100 |
| JDA Dijon (France) | 149–120 | (Czech Republic) Sparta Praha | 78–51 | 71–69 |
| Trodat Wels (Austria) | 160–147 | (Czech Republic) USK Trident Praha | 84–82 | 76–65 |

== Second round ==
| Team 1 | Agg. | Team 2 | 1st leg | 2nd leg |
|---|---|---|---|---|
| Avtodorozhnik (Russia) | 164–147 | (Lithuania) Atletas | 94–76 | 70–71 |
| Šiauliai (Lithuania) | 169–152 | (Federal Republic of Yugoslavia) BFC Beočin | 82–68 | 87–84 |
| Brotnjo (Bosnia and Herzegovina) | 137–259 | (Belgium) Spirou Charleroi | 69–118 | 68–141 |
| Atomerőmű (Hungary) | 138–195 | (Spain) Estudiantes Argentaria | 68–87 | 70–108 |
| Belgacom Union Mons (Belgium) | 184–199 | (Greece) Soulis Sporting | 92–92 | 92–107 |
| Savy Alytus (Lithuania) | 113–161 | (France) Pitch Cholet | 65–90 | 48–71 |
| Ficosota Shumen (Bulgaria) | 168–183 | (Turkey) PTT | 81–91 | 87–92 |
| Slavia Sofia (Bulgaria) | 159–203 | (Italy) Cagiva Varese | 89–104 | 70–97 |
| Kantrida (Croatia) | 159–169 | (Italy) Scavolini Pesaro | 72–75 | 87–94 |
| Žito (North Macedonia) | 123–149 | Croatia Osiguranje Split | 57–67 | 66–82 |
| Aarhus (Denmark) | 138–168 | (Israel) Maccabi Rishon LeZion | 65–70 | 73–98 |
| Kovinotehna Savinjska Polzela (Slovenia) | 118–154 | (Turkey) Efes Pilsen | 66–76 | 52–68 |
| Slavonska Banka Osijek (Croatia) | 157–175 | (Germany) UniVersa Bamberg | 78–89 | 79–86 |
| Hapoel Holon (Israel) | 135–177 | (Italy) Teamsystem Bologna | 75–89 | 60–88 |
| Bavaria Wolltex (Slovenia) | 169–160 | (Russia) Akvarius Volgograd | 87–77 | 82–83 |
| ASVEL (France) | 182–141 | (Israel) Hapoel Tel Aviv | 93–68 | 89–73 |
| Šilutė (Lithuania) | 184–175 | (Ukraine) Mykolaiv | 100–76 | 84–99 |
| Stal Bobrek Bytom (Poland) | 157–149 | (Ukraine) Shakhtar Donetsk | 79–69 | 78–80 |
| Einkaufswelt Fürstenfeld (Austria) | 151–218 | (Greece) AEK | 88–118 | 63–100 |
| MOL Szolnoki Olaj (Hungary) | 136–172 | (Greece) Aris Moda Bagno | 64–66 | 72–106 |
| MZT Skopje (North Macedonia) | 161–172 | (Russia) CSK VVS | 91–78 | 70–94 |
| Beira-Mar (Portugal) | 178–200 | (Spain) Amway Zaragoza | 92–116 | 86–84' |
| Borås (Sweden) | 154–201 | (Federal Republic of Yugoslavia) Borovica | 78–118 | 76–83 |
| Steiner Bayreut (Germany) | 131–163 | (Greece) Panionios Afisorama | 64–85 | 67–78 |
| London Towers (England) | 153–171 | (Turkey) Tofaş | 83–74 | 70–97 |
| Go Pass Pepinster (Belgium) | 141–165 | (Spain) TDK Manresa | 77–81 | 64–84 |
| Oliveirense (Portugal) | 131–159 | (France) Dijon | 71–71 | 60–88 |
| Fenerbahçe (Turkey) | 159–126 | (Belgium) Racing Basket Antwerpen | 92–61 | 67–65 |
| Brandt Hagen (Germany) | 135–153 | (Federal Republic of Yugoslavia) Vojvodina | 85–77 | 50–76 |
| Trodat Wels (Austria) | 147–165 | (Spain) Festina Andorra | 75–81 | 72–84 |

== Third round ==
| Team 1 | Agg. | Team 2 | 1st leg | 2nd leg |
|---|---|---|---|---|
| Avtodorozhnik (Russia) | 183–204 | (Germany) Alba Berlin | 86–98 | 97–106 |
| Šiauliai (Lithuania) | 130–172 | (Italy) Stefanel Milano | 74–81 | 56–91 |
| Spirou (Belgium) | 170–182 | (Spain) Estudiantes Argentaria | 80–85 | 90–97 |
| Soulis Sporting (Greece) | 166–156 | (France) Pitch Cholet | 95–76 | 71–80 |
| PTT (Turkey) | 121–148 | (Italy) Scavolini Pesaro | 61–73 | 60–75 |
| Croatia Osiguranje Split | 115–132 | (Italy) Cagiva Varese | 54–60 | 61–72 |
| Maccabi Rishon LeZion (Israel) | 118–161 | (Turkey) Efes Pilsen | 59–79 | 59–82 |
| UniVersa Bamberg (Germany) | 132–152 | (Italy) Teamsystem Bologna | 62–72 | 70–80 |
| Bavaria Wolltex (Slovenia) | 161–184 | (France) ASVEL | 98–103 | 63–81 |
| Šilutė (Lithuania) | 179–214 | (Greece) AEK | 79–93 | 100–121 |
| Stal Bobrek Bytom (Poland) | 131–148 | (Greece) Aris Moda Bagno | 80–54 | 51–94 |
| CSK VVS (Russia) | 171–192 | (Spain) Amway Zaragoza | 102–100 | 69–92 |
| Borovica (Federal Republic of Yugoslavia) | 140–162 | (Greece) Panionios Afisorama | 75–77 | 65–85 |
| Tofaş (Turkey) | 134–137 | (Spain) TDK Manresa | 70–64 | 64–73 |
| JDA Dijon (France) | 137–163 | (Turkey) Fenerbahçe | 69–72 | 68–91 |
| Vojvodina (Federal Republic of Yugoslavia) | 145–148 | (Spain) Festina Andorra | 81–69 | 64–79 |

== Group stage ==
Key to colors
| Top two places in each group advance to quarterfinals |

=== Group A ===
| Pos | Team | Pld | W | L | PF | PA | PD | Pts | MIL | FEN | EST | SPO |
|---|---|---|---|---|---|---|---|---|---|---|---|---|
| 1 | (Italy) Stefanel Milano | 6 | 5 | 1 | 533 | 473 | +60 | 11 | — | 79–73 | 87–68 | 110–83 |
| 2 | (Turkey) Fenerbahçe | 6 | 3 | 3 | 511 | 509 | +2 | 9 | 67–81 | — | 100–89 | 98–78 |
| 3 | (Spain) Estudiantes Argentaria | 6 | 2 | 4 | 493 | 518 | −25 | 8 | 86–76 | 76–83 | — | 86–88 |
| 4 | (Greece) Soulis Sporting | 6 | 2 | 4 | 535 | 572 | −37 | 8 | 96–100 | 106–90 | 84–88 | — |

Source: FIBA Europe

=== Group B ===
| Pos | Team | Pld | W | L | PF | PA | PD | Pts | EFES | VAR | PAN | AND |
|---|---|---|---|---|---|---|---|---|---|---|---|---|
| 1 | (Turkey) Efes Pilsen | 6 | 5 | 1 | 429 | 389 | +40 | 11 | — | 80–60 | 68–66 | 78–52 |
| 2 | (Italy) Cagiva Varese | 6 | 4 | 2 | 458 | 429 | +29 | 10 | 80–56 | — | 96–91 | 78–61 |
| 3 | (Greece) Panionios Afisorama | 6 | 3 | 3 | 445 | 431 | +14 | 9 | 68–75 | 68–61 | — | 80–68 |
| 4 | (Spain) Festina Andorra | 6 | 0 | 6 | 380 | 463 | −83 | 6 | 63–72 | 73–83 | 63–72 | — |

Source: FIBA Europe

=== Group C ===
| Pos | Team | Pld | W | L | PF | PA | PD | Pts | FOR | ALBA | ARIS | ZAR |
|---|---|---|---|---|---|---|---|---|---|---|---|---|
| 1 | (Italy) Teamsystem Bologna | 6 | 4 | 2 | 486 | 489 | −3 | 10 | — | 101–79 | 88–84 | 82–81 |
| 2 | (Germany) Alba Berlin | 6 | 4 | 2 | 538 | 525 | +13 | 10 | 86–78 | — | 104–86 | 89–87 |
| 3 | (Greece) Aris Moda Bagno | 6 | 3 | 3 | 499 | 490 | +9 | 9 | 83–60 | 81–79 | — | 81–70 |
| 4 | (Spain) Amway Zaragoza | 6 | 1 | 5 | 495 | 514 | −19 | 7 | 76–77 | 92–101 | 89–84 | — |

Source: FIBA Europe

=== Group D ===
| Pos | Team | Pld | W | L | PF | PA | PD | Pts | ASV | SCA | MAN | AEK |
|---|---|---|---|---|---|---|---|---|---|---|---|---|
| 1 | (France) ASVEL | 6 | 5 | 1 | 463 | 454 | +9 | 11 | — | 66–58 | 91–78 | 69–91 |
| 2 | (Italy) Scavolini Pesaro | 6 | 3 | 3 | 468 | 460 | +8 | 9 | 83–86 | — | 94–69 | 93–86 |
| 3 | (Spain) TDK Manresa | 6 | 2 | 4 | 476 | 492 | −16 | 8 | 71–72 | 90–68 | — | 88–84 |
| 4 | (Greece) AEK | 6 | 2 | 4 | 480 | 481 | −1 | 8 | 73–79 | 63–72 | 83–80 | — |

Source: FIBA Europe

== Quarterfinals ==
| Team 1 | Agg. | Team 2 | 1st leg | 2nd leg |
|---|---|---|---|---|
| Fenerbahçe (Turkey) | 142–151 | (Turkey) Efes Pilsen | 68–95 | 74–56 |
| Cagiva Varese (Italy) | 162–170 | (Italy) Stefanel Milano | 72–81 | 90–89 |
| Alba Berlin (Germany) | 155–157 | (France) ASVEL | 79–75 | 76–82 |
| Scavolini Pesaro (Italy) | 170–184 | (Italy) Teamsystem Bologna | 81–84 | 89–100 |

== Semifinals ==
| Team 1 | Agg. | Team 2 | 1st leg | 2nd leg |
|---|---|---|---|---|
| Efes Pilsen (Turkey) | 193–175 | (Italy) Teamsystem Bologna | 102–78 | 91–97 |
| Stefanel Milano (Italy) | 154–141 | (France) ASVEL | 73–69 | 81–72 |

== Finals ==
| Team 1 | Agg. | Team 2 | 1st leg | 2nd leg |
|---|---|---|---|---|
| Efes Pilsen (Turkey) | 146–145 | (Italy) Stefanel Milano | 76–68 | 70–77 |

== Rosters ==
(Turkey) Efes Pilsen: Petar Naumoski, Ufuk Sarica, Volkan Aydin, Conrad McRae, Tamer Oyguc (C); Murat Evliyaoglu, Mirsad Türkcan. Coach: Aydın Örs
(Italy) Stefanel Milano: Ferdinando Gentile (C), Dejan Bodiroga, Rolando Blackman, Gregor Fucka, Davide Cantarello; Alessandro De Pol, Flavio Portaluppi, Paolo Alberti. Coach: Bogdan Tanjević

1995–96 FIBA Korać Cup Champions

Efes Pilsen
1st title

== See also ==
- 1995–96 Euroleague
- 1995–96 FIBA European Cup
