= Marko Milić (basketball) =

Slovenian basketball player (born 1977)

Personal information
- Born: May 7, 1977 (age 49) Kranj, SR Slovenia, Yugoslavia
- Listed height: 1.99 m (6 ft 6 in)
- Listed weight: 112 kg (247 lb)

Career information
- NBA draft: 1997: 2nd round, 33rd overall pick
- Drafted by: Philadelphia 76ers
- Playing career: 1991–2015
- Position: Power forward
- Number: 12, 20
- Coaching career: 2022–present

Career history

Playing
- 1991–1994: Triglav Kranj
- 1994–1997: Union Olimpija
- 1997–1998: Phoenix Suns
- 1998: Fenerbahçe
- 1999: Phoenix Suns
- 1999–2000: Union Olimpija
- 2000–2001: Real Madrid
- 2001–2002: Fortitudo Bologna
- 2002–2003: Roseto
- 2003–2005: Pesaro
- 2005–2006: Virtus Bologna
- 2006–2007: Union Olimpija
- 2007: Real Madrid
- 2007–2009: Union Olimpija
- 2009: Entente Orléanaise
- 2010–2012: Vanoli Cremona
- 2012–2013: Mahram Tehran
- 2013–2015: Al Kuwait

Coaching
- 2022–2025: Dallas Mavericks (assistant)

Career highlights
- ULEB Cup champion (2007); 3× FIBA EuroStar (1996, 1998, 1999); Spanish League champion (2007); Adriatic League All-Star (2007); 4× Slovenian League champion (1995–1997, 2008); 4× Slovenian Cup winner (1995, 1997, 2000, 2008); 5× Slovenian League All-Star (1994–1997, 2000); 2× Slovenian League All-Star MVP (1997, 2000); 2× Slovenian League All-Star Slam Dunk winner (1994, 1995); Kuwaiti League champion (2014); No. 12 retired by Union Olimpija (2015)
- Stats at NBA.com
- Stats at Basketball Reference

Marko Milić (born May 7, 1977) is a Slovenian basketball coach and former player who most recently served as an assistant coach for the Dallas Mavericks of the National Basketball Association (NBA). He represented the senior Slovenian national basketball team.

== Playing career ==
=== Professional career ===
After being selected by the Philadelphia 76ers in the 1997 NBA draft (34th pick overall), Milić's rights were traded to the Phoenix Suns. After seeing limited NBA duty (44 career games) during his two seasons with the Suns, he returned to Europe and played for Union Olimpija (where he started playing senior basketball), Real Madrid (two stints), Fortitudo Bologna (Italian League runner-up), Pesaro (2004 Italian Cup finalist) and Virtus Bologna. He also represented Fenerbahçe in the first part of the 1998–99 season, due to the NBA season's lockout, returning to Phoenix in January 1999.

Milić won four Slovenian Leagues and four Slovenian Cups with Union Olimpija and led the team to its only EuroLeague Final Four appearance so far, in 1997. With Real Madrid he had his biggest success as a player with the ULEB Cup title of 2007 paired with a Spanish League title that same year. He also won the Kuwait League in 2014.

On October 14, 2015, he announced his retirement from playing professional basketball. On October 29, 2015, Union Olimpija retired Marko Milič's #12 jersey.

=== National team career ===
With the junior national teams of Slovenia, Milič played at the 1994 FIBA Europe Under-22 Championship and the 1996 FIBA Europe Under-22 Championship.

Milić played for the senior national basketball team of Slovenia, from 1995 until 2006. He played at the EuroBasket 1995, EuroBasket 1997, EuroBasket 1999, EuroBasket 2001, EuroBasket 2003, EuroBasket 2005 and 2006 FIBA World Championship.

== Coaching career ==
In 2022, Milić was hired as an assistant coach with the Dallas Mavericks under head coach Jason Kidd who was his teammate in the Phoenix Suns. He stepped down as an assistant coach of the Mavericks on February 9, 2025, following the trade of Luka Dončić.

== Personal life ==
Milić's father, Vladimir Milić, a Serb from Croatia based in Belgrade, was a shotputting champion in former Yugoslavia. His mother, Metka Papler, was also a successful sportswoman in Yugoslavia. His daughter is a tennis player Ela Nala Milić.

== Club career statistics ==
Legend
GP	Games played	GS	Games started	MPG	Minutes per game
FG%	Field-goal percentage	3P%	3-point field-goal percentage	FT%	Free-throw percentage
RPG	Rebounds per game	APG	Assists per game	SPG	Steals per game
BPG	Blocks per game	PPG	Points per game	PIR	Performance index rating
**Bold**	Career high

=== EuroLeague ===
Year	Team	GP	GS	MPG	FG%	3P%	FT%	RPG	APG	SPG	BPG	PPG	PIR
2000–01	Real Madrid	15	8	22.8	.519	**.300**	.556	4.6	1.9	**1.8**	—	9.3	10.9
2001–02	Skipper Bologna	18	15	21.2	.496	.267	.659	3.6	1.4	**1.8**	**.1**	9.3	8.7
2004–05	Scavolini Pesaro	**22**	**19**	26.2	.489	.250	.617	4.6	2.2	1.6	—	10.4	11.2
2006–07	Union Olimpija	11	11	26.8	.611	.200	.550	**6.9**	**2.5**	1.0	**.1**	15.1	**16.3**
2007–08	Union Olimpija	14	14	**30.5**	.517	.125	**.744**	6.4	1.5	1.2	**.1**	**15.6**	15.8
2008–09	Union Olimpija	6	4	21.4	.378	—	.714	3.7	1.3	1.2	—	9.0	9.2
2009–10	Entente Orléanaise	3	1	9.2	**1.000**	—	.667	2.0	—	.3	—	2.7	5.0
Career		89	72	24.5	.513	.239	.628	4.8	1.8	1.5	.0	11.0	11.6

=== NBA ===
==== Regular season ====
Year	Team	GP	GS	MPG	FG%	3P%	FT%	RPG	APG	SPG	BPG	PPG
1997–98	Phoenix	33	0	4.9	.609	.500	.647	.8	.4	.3	.0	2.8
1998–99	Phoenix	11	0	4.8	.400	.000	—	.5	.2	.3	.1	1.5
Career		44	0	4.9	.560	.429	.647	.7	.3	.3	.0	2.5

==== Playoffs ====
Year	Team	GP	GS	MPG	FG%	3P%	FT%	RPG	APG	SPG	BPG	PPG
1998	Phoenix	2	0	2.0	.667	—	—	.5	.0	.5	.0	2.0
Career		2	0	2.0	.667	—	—	.5	.0	.5	.0	2.0
