= 1996–97 Slovenian Basketball League =

- League: Slovenian Basketball League
- Sport: Basketball
- TV partner: RTV Slovenija

Regular season
- Season champions: Smelt Olimpija
- Season MVP: (Croatia) Teo Čizmić

Playoffs
- Finals champions: Smelt Olimpija
- Runners-up: Kovinotehna Savinjska Polzela

Slovenian Basketball League seasons
- ← 1995–96 1997–98 →

The 1996–97 Slovenian Basketball League was the sixth season of the Premier A Slovenian Basketball League, the highest professional basketball league in Slovenia.

== Regular season ==
Pos	Team	P	W	L	F	A	Pts
1	Smelt Olimpija	22	22	0	2038	1485	44
2	Kovinotehna Savinjska	22	14	8	1821	1688	36
3	Republika Postojna	22	12	10	1836	1843	34
4	Helios Domžale	22	12	10	1834	1743	34
5	Pivovarna Laško	22	11	11	1785	1750	34
6	Satex Maribor	22	11	11	1756	1705	33
7	Maribor Ovni	22	11	11	1806	1824	33
8	Idrija	22	10	12	1543	1663	32
9	Litostroj Slovan	22	10	12	1669	1706	32
10	Kraški zidar	22	8	14	1628	1846	28
11	Krško	22	7	15	1660	1786	28
12	Rogaška Donat Mg	22	4	18	1735	2072	25

P=Matches played, W=Matches won, L=Matches lost, F=Points for, A=Points against, Pts=Points

Qualified for the Champions stage
Relegated to the Second league

== Champions standings ==
=== Group A ===
Pos	Team	Total					
		P	W	L	F	A	Pts
1	Smelt Olimpija	12	12	0	1094	803	24
2	Pivovarna Laško	12	5	7	948	963	17
3	Helios Domžale	12	4	8	894	969	16
4	Idrija	12	3	9	838	1039	15

P=Matches played, W=Matches won, L=Matches lost, F=Points for, A=Points against, Pts=Points

=== Group B ===
Pos	Team	Total					
		P	W	L	F	A	Pts
1	Kovinotehna Savinjska	12	8	4	970	888	20
2	Republika Postojna	12	6	6	969	990	18
3	Maribor Ovni	12	6	6	963	999	18
4	Satex Maribor	12	4	8	913	938	16

P=Matches played, W=Matches won, L=Matches lost, F=Points for, A=Points against, Pts=Points

Qualified for the Playoff stage

== Playoffs ==
Semi-finals
A1	Smelt Olimpija	2
B2	Republika Postojna	0
B1	Kovinotehna Savinjska	2
A2	Pivovarna Laško	1

Final
A1	Smelt Olimpija	3
B1	Kovinotehna Savinjska Polzela	1

Slovenian League 1996–97
Champions

Smelt Olimpija
6th title

== Top scorers ==
	Player	Club	Points
1	Matjaž Tovornik	Pivovarna Laško	785
2	Teo Čizmić	Republika Postojna	733
3	Miljan Goljović	Bavaria-Woltex Maribor	691
4	Rade Lisica	Pivovarna Laško	509
5	Veljko Petranović	Polzela	508
6	Jakub Genjac	Helios	491
7	Goran Jagodnik	Polzela	478
8	Kovačević	Republika Postojna	457
9	Mario Primorac	Satex Maribor	453
10	Jadranko Čović	Idrija	399
