= 1995–96 Slovenian Basketball League =

- League: Slovenian Basketball League
- Sport: Basketball
- TV partner: RTV Slovenija

Regular season
- Season champions: Smelt Olimpija

Playoffs
- Finals champions: Smelt Olimpija
- Runners-up: Interier Krško

Slovenian Basketball League seasons
- ← 1994–95 1996–97 →

The 1995–96 Slovenian Basketball League was the fifth season of the Premier A Slovenian Basketball League, the highest professional basketball league in Slovenia.

== Regular season ==
Pos	Team	P	W	L	F	A	Pts
1	Smelt Olimpija	22	17	5	1872	1591	39
2	Interier Krško	22	16	6	1852	1717	38
3	Rogaška Donat Mg	22	14	8	1817	1802	36
4	Kovinotehna Savinjska	22	13	9	1886	1808	35
5	Idrija	22	12	10	1707	1647	34
6	Satex Maribor	22	12	10	1892	1846	34
7	Bavaria Wolltex	22	12	10	1907	1934	34
8	Litostroj	22	11	11	1699	1695	33
9	Republika Postojna (–1)	22	8	14	1757	1784	29
10	Helios Suns	22	6	16	1642	1766	28
11	Iskra Litus Litija	22	6	16	1503	1672	28
12	Triglav Kranj	22	5	17	1634	1906	27

P=Matches played, W=Matches won, L=Matches lost, F=Points for, A=Points against, Pts=Points

Qualified for the Champions stage
Relegated to the Second league

== Champions standings ==
Pos	Team	Total					
		P	W	L	F	A	Pts
1	Smelt Olimpija	28	20	8	2483	2156	48
2	Interier Krško	28	19	9	2409	2259	47
3	Kovinotehna Savinjska	28	16	12	2406	2370	44
4	Idrija	28	14	14	2344	2221	42
5	Satex Maribor	28	14	14	2435	2439	42
6	Rogaška Donat Mg	28	11	17	2216	2384	40
7	Bavaria Wolltex	28	10	18	2522	2623	38
8	Litostroj	28	8	20	2165	2320	36

P=Matches played, W=Matches won, L=Matches lost, F=Points for, A=Points against, Pts=Points

Qualified for the Playoff stage

== Playoffs ==
Semi-finals
1	Smelt Olimpija	2
4	Idrija	0
2	Interier Krško	2
3	Kovinotehna Savinjska	0

Final
1	Smelt Olimpija	3
2	Interier Krško	1

Slovenian League 1995–96
Champions

Smelt Olimpija
5th title
