= 1993–94 Slovenian Basketball League =

- League: Slovenian Basketball League
- Sport: Basketball
- Duration: 18 Sept. 93 – 30 March 94
- TV partner: RTV Slovenija

Regular season
- Season champions: Savinjska Polzela

Playoffs
- Finals champions: Smelt Olimpija
- Runners-up: TAM Bus Miklavž

Slovenian Basketball League seasons
- ← 1992–93 1994–95 →

The 1993–94 Slovenian Basketball League was the third season of the Premier A Slovenian Basketball League, the highest professional basketball league in Slovenia. The first half of the season consisted of 16 teams and two groups (members of SBA league were absent) began on Saturday, 18 September 1993 and ended on 5 December 1993. Kokra Lipje withdrew before the start of the season.

== Green group ==
Pos	Team	P	W	L	F	A	Pts
1	Helios Domžale	14	10	4	1202	1077	24
2	Savinjska Polzela	14	10	4	1079	995	24
3	Litostroj Slovan	14	9	5	1057	1031	23
4	Triglav Kranj	14	9	5	1126	1040	23
5	Rogaška Donat Mg	14	9	5	1087	1089	23
6	Comet	14	5	9	1059	1094	19
7	Ježica	14	2	12	980	1103	16
8	Tinex Norik Medvode	14	2	12	1020	1181	16

P=Matches played, W=Matches won, L=Matches lost, F=Points for, A=Points against, Pts=Points

Qualified for the Green Group

== Red group ==
Pos	Team	P	W	L	F	A	Pts
1	Satex Maribor	12	10	2	1145	988	22
2	Kraški zidar	12	9	3	1009	975	21
3	Idrija	12	7	5	1028	950	19
4	Interier Krško	12	6	6	948	987	18
5	KM Ilirija	12	6	6	1017	991	18
6	Litija	12	3	9	932	996	15
7	Smelt Olimpija mladi	12	1	11	821	1013	13

P=Matches played, W=Matches won, L=Matches lost, F=Points for, A=Points against, Pts=Points

Qualified for the Green Group

== Green group final standings ==
Pos	Team	Total					
		P	W	L	F	A	Pts
1	Savinjska Polzela	14	10	4	1069	976	24
2	Triglav Kranj	14	9	5	1086	1052	23
3	Helios Domžale	14	8	6	1193	1189	22
4	Litostroj Slovan	14	7	7	1031	1043	21
5	Satex Maribor	14	6	8	1260	1252	20
6	Rogaška Donat Mg	14	6	8	1071	1122	20
7	Kraški zidar	14	5	9	1076	1099	19
8	Comet	14	5	9	1042	1101	19

P=Matches played, W=Matches won, L=Matches lost, F=Points for, A=Points against, Pts=Points

Qualified for the Champions stage

== Red group final standings ==
Pos	Team	Total					
		P	W	L	F	A	Pts
1	KM Ilirija	12	12	0	1028	900	24
2	Idrija	12	8	4	946	896	20
3	Litija	12	8	4	939	870	20
4	Interier Krško	12	6	6	904	933	18
5	Smelt Olimpija mladi	12	4	8	810	879	16
6	Tinex Norik Medvode	12	2	10	931	1019	14
7	Ježica	12	2	10	880	941	14

P=Matches played, W=Matches won, L=Matches lost, F=Points for, A=Points against, Pts=Points

Relegated

== Champions standings ==
Pos	Team	Total					
		P	W	L	F	A	Pts
1	Smelt Olimpija	14	12	2	1244	1031	26
2	TAM Bus Miklavž	14	9	5	1191	1136	23
3	Kovinotehna Savinjska	14	6	8	1082	1103	20
4	Postojna	14	6	8	1029	1073	20
5	Triglav Kranj	14	6	8	1074	1094	20
6	Slovenica Koper	14	6	8	1145	1148	20
7	Helios Domžale	14	6	8	1097	1188	20
8	Litostroj Slovan	14	5	9	980	1069	19

P=Matches played, W=Matches won, L=Matches lost, F=Points for, A=Points against, Pts=Points

Qualified for the Playoff stage

== Playoffs ==
Semi-finals
1	Smelt Olimpija	2
4	Postojna	0
2	TAM Bus Miklavž	2
3	Kovinotehna Savinjska Polzela	1

Final
1	Smelt Olimpija	3
2	TAM Bus Miklavž	0

Slovenian League 1993–94
Champions

Smelt Olimpija
3rd title
