= 1994–95 Slovenian Basketball League =

- League: Slovenian Basketball League
- Sport: Basketball
- TV partner: RTV Slovenija

Regular season
- Season champions: Smelt Olimpija

Playoffs
- Finals champions: Smelt Olimpija
- Runners-up: Kovinotehna Savinjska Polzela

Slovenian Basketball League seasons
- ← 1993–94 1995–96 →

The 1994–95 Slovenian Basketball League was the fourth season of the Premier A Slovenian Basketball League, the highest professional basketball league in Slovenia.

== Regular season ==
Pos	Team	P	W	L	F	A	Pts
1	Smelt Olimpija	22	20	2	2005	1616	42
2	Kovinotehna Savinjska	22	16	6	1904	1724	38
3	Satex Maribor	22	14	8	1929	1781	36
4	Triglav Kranj	22	13	9	1698	1690	35
5	Rogaška Donat Mg	22	12	10	1804	1799	34
6	Bavaria Wolltex	22	12	10	1858	1863	34
7	Litostroj Slovan	22	12	10	1826	1692	34
8	Postojna	22	10	12	1715	1770	32
9	Ilirija	22	8	14	1737	1816	30
10	Helios Domžale	22	6	16	1681	1863	28
11	Kraški zidar	22	6	16	1733	1802	28
12	Koper	22	3	19	1660	2134	24

P=Matches played, W=Matches won, L=Matches lost, F=Points for, A=Points against, Pts=Points

Qualified for the Champions stage
Relegated to the Second league

== Champions standings ==
Pos	Team	Total					
		P	W	L	F	A	Pts
1	Smelt Olimpija	28	25	3	2463	2099	53
2	Kovinotehna Savinjska	28	17	11	2410	2313	45
3	Bavaria Wolltex	28	16	12	2434	2404	44
4	Satex Maribor	28	14	14	2477	2466	42
5	Litostroj Slovan	28	12	16	2277	2257	40
6	Rogaška Donat Mg	28	12	16	2279	2367	40
7	Postojna	28	10	18	2225	2374	38
8	Triglav Kranj	28	6	22	2048	2333	34

P=Matches played, W=Matches won, L=Matches lost, F=Points for, A=Points against, Pts=Points

Qualified for the Playoff stage

== Playoffs ==
Semi-finals
1	Smelt Olimpija	2
4	Satex Maribor	1
2	Kovinotehna Savinjska	2
3	Bavaria Wolltex	0

Final
1	Smelt Olimpija	3
2	Kovinotehna Savinjska Polzela	0

Slovenian League 1994–95
Champions

Smelt Olimpija
4th title
