= KK Osječki sokol =

- Nickname: Sokoli ("Falcons")
- Leagues: A-1 Liga
- Founded: 1963
- History: 1963 - Present
- Arena: Sportska dvorana Jug 2 (capacity: 1,250)
- Location: Osijek, Croatia
- Team colors: Blue and White
- President: Miodrag Borojević
- Head coach: Zoran Helbich
Home	Away

Košarkaški klub Osječki sokol is a professional basketball club based in Osijek, Croatia. Osječki sokol currently competes in Croatian second league, division East.

Club was founded in 1996 as KK Hrvatski sokol. In 2005 it merged with troubled traditional Osijek's basketball club KK Olimpija (formerly known as KK Osijek) to form KK Osijek 2006. In 2010 name was changed to the current one.
