= KK ZM Maribor Lumar =

Basketball team based in Maribor, Slovenia

Košarkarski klub ZM Lumar Maribor was a professional basketball team based in Maribor, Slovenia. The club competed in the Slovenian Basketball League during the 1990s and early 2000s and played in European basketball competitions such as Saporta Cup and FIBA Korać Cup.

== History ==
The club was founded as KK Miklavž in the early 1990s. Miklavž, competing under the sponsorship name TAM Bus, debuted in international competitions in the 1993–94 FIBA Korać Cup, where they eliminated German side TTL Bamberg in the first round. In 1994, the club was renamed as Bavaria Wolltex or simply BW Maribor due to sponsorship reasons. After that, the team played in the 1995–96 and 1997–98 editions of the FIBA Korać Cup. They also competed in the 1996–97 FIBA EuroCup, where BW was eliminated in the round of 32 by Fenerbahçe. In 1998, they were renamed as ZM Lumar Maribor. A year later, the club merged with city rivals Branik Maribor and ŽKK Maribor.

In 2005, KK ZM Lumar Maribor was dissolved due to financial difficulties.

=== Team names ===
- Maricom Miklavž (1993)
- TAM Bus Miklavž/Maribor (1993–1994)
- BWC Maribor / BW Maribor / Bavaria Wolltex (1994–1997)
- Maribor Ovni (1997–1998)
- ZM Lumar (1998–1999)

== Honours ==
- Slovenian Basketball League

Runners-up: 1993–94
Semifinals: 1992–93, 1994–95

- Slovenian Basketball Cup

Runners-up: 1996
