= KK Branik Maribor =

Branik Maribor
- Leagues: Slovenian Second League
- Founded: 1948; 78 years ago (as KK Polet); 2001; 25 years ago (as ŠD Primorac)
- Arena: Lukna Sports Hall (Capacity: 2,100)
- Location: Maribor, Slovenia
- Team colors: Black, white
- President: Matjaž Madžarac
- Head coach: Aleš Pipan
- Website: Official website
Home	Away

Košarkarski klub Branik Maribor (English: Basketball Club Branik Maribor), commonly referred to as KK Branik Maribor or simply Branik, is a basketball team based in Maribor, Slovenia. As of the 2026–27 season, Branik competes in the Slovenian Second League, the second level of Slovenian basketball.

Branik was originally formed in 1948 as a basketball section of SŠD Polet, but it disbanded in 2005 due to financial problems. In 2001, a new team known as ŠD Primorac was created, which in 2008 became part of the Branik Sports Association. The club sees itself as the successor to the team that disbanded in 2005.

== History ==
=== 1948–2005 ===
The club was formed in 1948 as a basketball section of SŠD Polet. In 1950, Polet renamed as Branik and won its first Slovenian republic title in 1952 after defeating Krim in the final. In 1966, the club left the Branik Sports Association and renamed as KK Maribor 66. Under that name, they played in the Yugoslav First Federal Basketball League in the 1969–70 season. The club then competed as KK Marles due to the sponsorship agreement, while the Branik Sports Association formed its own team to compete in lower ranks. After Marles relegated to the republic level (third tier in Yugoslavia), both teams merged back in 1975 under the name Branik. In 1987, the club merged with city rivals ŽKK Maribor to form KK Maribor 87 as a new city team. The latter played in the Yugoslav 1. B League, but after Slovenia's independence in 1991 it disintegrated back to ŽKK and Branik. Branik took Maribor 87's place in the Slovenian top division and played there until 2000. All teams based in Maribor, including Branik, folded in 2005.

=== 2008–present ===
ŠD Primorac Basketball School, formed in 2001, joined the Branik Sports Association in 2008 and renamed as AKK Branik in 2011. The team qualified for the Slovenian Second League in the 2007–08 season. Branik was relegated back to the third division after finishing dead last in the 2012–13 season. After KK Maribor went bankrupt in 2015 and Branik remained the only basketball team in the city, the Basketball Federation of Slovenia invited them to compete in the Slovenian Second League for the 2015–16 season.

== Arena ==
The team's home arena is Lukna Sports Hall in Maribor with a capacity of 2,100.

== Season-by-season records ==
Season	League	Position	Season	League	Position
1949	Slovenian League	5th	1969*	Yugoslav Second League West	1st
1950	Slovenian League	2nd	1970*	Yugoslav First Federal League	12th
1951	Slovenian League	2nd	1970*	Yugoslav Second League West	6th
1952	Slovenian League	1st	1971*	Yugoslav Second League West	12th
1953	Slovenian League	?	1972	Slovenian League	12th
1954	Slovenian League	2nd	1973	Slovenian League	8th
1955	Slovenian League	1st	1974	Slovenian League	8th
1956	Slovenian League	2nd	1975	Slovenian League	4th
1957	Slovenian League	5th	1976	Slovenian League	7th
1958	Slovenian League	6th	1977	Slovenian League	6th
1959	Slovenian League	5th	1978	Slovenian League	1st
1960	Slovenian League	6th	1979	Slovenian League	2nd
1961	Slovenian League	4th	1980	Slovenian League	1st
1962	Slovenian League	3rd	1981	Yugoslav Second League West	12th
1963	Slovenian League	5th	1982	Slovenian League	3rd
1964	Slovenian League	5th	1983	Slovenian League	7th
1965	Slovenian League	1st	1984	Slovenian League	3rd
1966*	Slovenian League	3rd	1985	Slovenian League	6th
1967*	Slovenian League	5th	1986	Slovenian League	7th
1968*	Yugoslav Second League West	1st	1987	Slovenian League	2nd

- As Maribor 66
