= Milan Gurović =

Serbian basketball player and coach

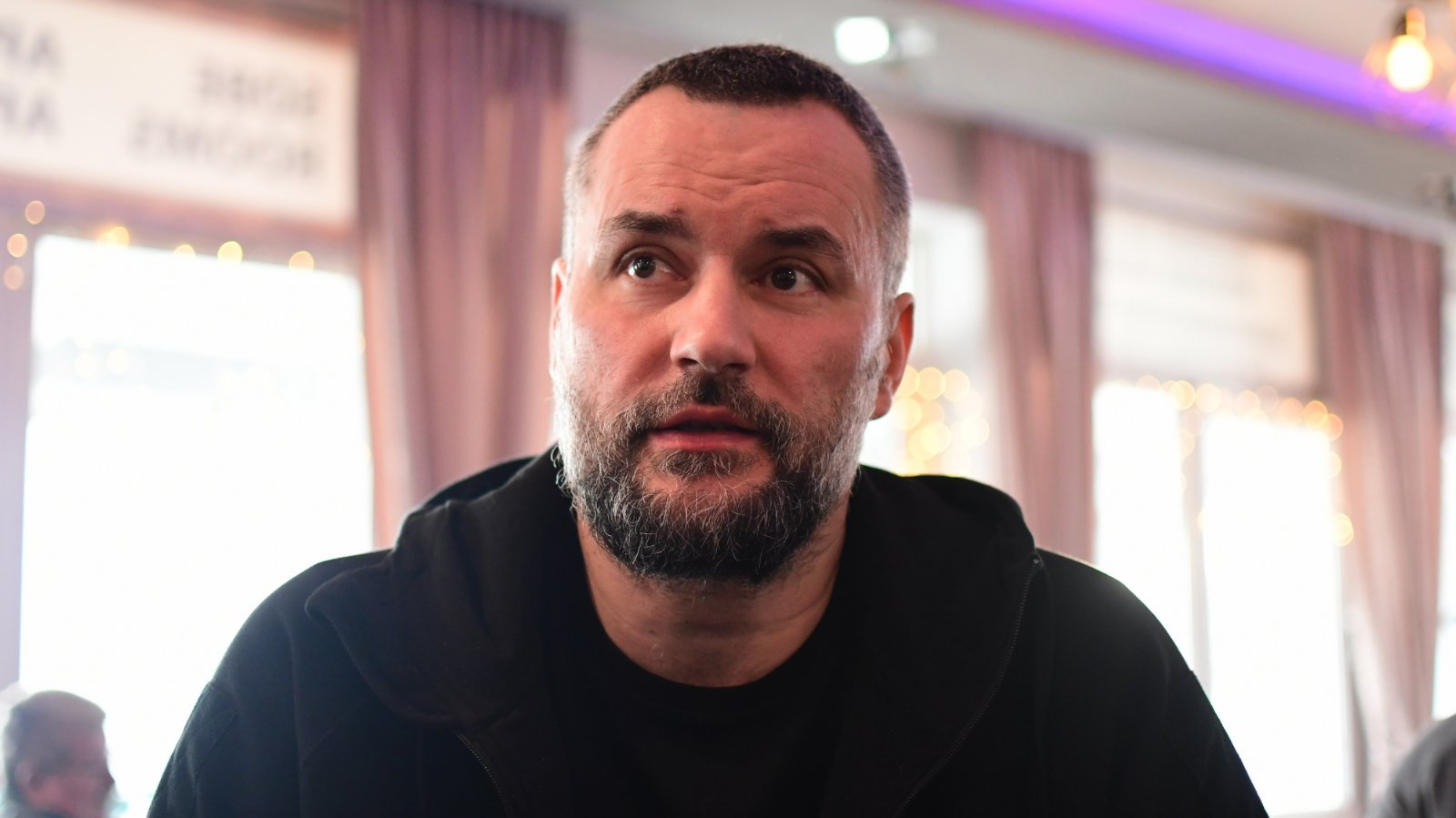
- Gurović in 2022

Personal information
- Born: 17 June 1975 (age 51) Novi Sad, SR Serbia, SFR Yugoslavia
- Listed height: 6 ft 9 in (2.06 m)
- Listed weight: 209 lb (95 kg)

Career information
- NBA draft: 1997: undrafted
- Playing career: 1993–2009
- Position: Shooting guard / small forward
- Number: 8, 11, 15, 32, 51
- Coaching career: 2012–2016

Career history

Playing
- 1993–1998: Peristeri
- 1998–2000: FC Barcelona
- 2000: AEK Athens
- 2000–2001: Telit Trieste
- 2001–2003: Unicaja Málaga
- 2003–2004: NIS Vojvodina
- 2004: Partizan
- 2005: Joventut Badalona
- 2005–2007: Crvena zvezda
- 2007–2008: Prokom Trefl
- 2008–2009: Galatasaray

Coaching
- 2012–2013: Crvena zvezda (assistant)
- 2013–2015: FMP
- 2016: Vršac

Career highlights
- EuroCup Top Scorer (2007); FIBA Korać Cup champion (1999); Spanish League champion (1999); Spanish All-Star Game MVP (2001 II); ABA League MVP (2007); ABA League Top Scorer (2007); Serbian League MVP (2007); Serbian Cup winner (2006); Polish League champion (2008)

Milan Gurović (Serbian Cyrillic: Милан Гуровић; born 17 June 1975) is a Serbian former professional basketball player and current basketball coach. During his pro career, he played for numerous clubs from all over Europe. Gurović was also a member of the senior national teams of both FR Yugoslavia / Serbia and Montenegro and Serbia.

== Early life ==
Gurović was born in Novi Sad, SR Serbia, SFR Yugoslavia to Serbian parents. His father Božidar and mother Mara, both hailed from the vicinity of Trebinje, in Herzegovina. Raised in the Novi Sad neighbourhood of Detelinara with a younger brother, Veljko, young Milan began practicing kung fu at age 11 before taking up basketball two years later.

== Club career ==
=== Early years ===
After beginning to pursue structured basketball at thirteen years of age with KK Slavija Novi Sad, Gurović quickly moved across town to join the youth system of the more established NAP Novi Sad a.k.a. Naftagas Promet under coach Zoran Trivan.

Two years later, at age fifteen, he debuted for NAP's first team thus getting a chance to compete against grown men in the Yugoslav Second Basketball League. He simultaneously attended the streamlined Agricultural High School in Novi Sad.

=== Peristeri ===
Marking himself out quickly as a talented prospect at NAP, in December 1991, Gurović was noticed by a Greek basketball scout who convinced the 16-year-old teenager's parents to authorize their son's move to Greece. Although initially told by the scout that he'd be joining Olympiakos, the teenager ended up at Peristeri, getting attached to its youth team. He would simultaneously train with the club's first team coached by Kostas Politis.

In the 1993-94 season, still part of the youth squad, he began getting occasional first team opportunities.

For five days in the summer of 1994, during his first visit home since moving to Greece, 19-year-old Gurović was attached to the newly-promoted BFC Beočin's training camp in Novi Sad's SPENS arena in order to improve his basketball skills and fitness level. Training for the upcoming 1994-95 YUBA League season, the club's first in FR Yugoslavia's top-tier league, BFC's coaching staff—consisting of head coach Muta Nikolić and his assistant Zoran Trivan (Gurović's old coach at NAP)—decided to accommodate young Gurović, a player not on their roster, in order to help his basketball development.

By the 1994-95 league season, Gurović entered Peristeri's first team permanently. As was the case with many young basketball players from former Yugoslavia at the time (mostly of Serbian ethnicity), he also took Greek citizenship, and thus competed as a domestic player, under the name Milan Malatras.

From summer 1995, for the following two seasons at Peristeri, Gurović was coached by compatriot Dragan Šakota whom the player credits for greatly helping him improve his game and find his footing in a foreign country at such a young age. It was Šakota who moved Gurović to the small forward position having previously been deployed at power forward or even center. Playing alongside another talented Serbian youngster and future star Marko Jarić, who joined the club in 1996, it was not long before Gurović started showing exceptional quality. By his fourth season with the club, 1997–98, he averaged 17.2 points per game.

=== FC Barcelona ===
In the summer of 1998, in-demand Gurović moved to FC Barcelona, signing a two-year contract with an optional third year. Brought in by the Barça management as replacement for forward Marcelo Nicola who moved on to Benetton, the Serb's transfer to Barcelona was a big money deal that heightened expectations. Prior to signing with Barcelona, the forward was very close to joining Ettore Messina's Virtus Bologna, even making a trip to Bologna with his agent Rade Filipovich of BDA Sports International agency and interacting with the team's players Radoslav Nesterović and Predrag Danilović.

Joining the 1998–99 roster featuring compatriot Saša Đorđević, Efthimios Rentzias, incoming Derrick Alston and Rodrigo de la Fuente, including up-and-coming youth players Pau Gasol and Juan Carlos Navarro, Gurović made a valuable contribution to the Barça team that won the Spanish ACB League title and European Korać Cup.

=== 2000–01 season ===
==== Rejecting Panathinaikos ====
Over the summer 2000, Gurović got called up for the FR Yugoslavia national team training camp for the Sydney Olympics before getting cut by the national team's head coach Željko Obradović and thus not included on the final 12-man roster the coach took to Australia. Many years later, Gurović revealed that, following the Olympics, Obradović made him an offer of joining his club side, reigning EuroLeague champion Panathinaikos. However, still mad about not being taken to the Olympics, 25-year-old Gurović rejected the offer, figuring that Obradović was just stroking his ego after cutting him in the national team. Gurović also revealed a later personal realization that rejecting the Panathinaikos offer was a regrettable mistake.

==== Joining AEK ====
Still, despite not taking the Panathinaikos offer, return to Greece was on the cards with their city rivals AEK Athens coached by Dušan Ivković with Martin Müürsepp and new acquisition İbrahim Kutluay on the roster. However, after a good start in Euroleague, the club ran into financial issues that resulted in player salaries being late. Not keen on staying at the club under financial uncertainty, Gurović left AEK in late December 2000 after appearing in only 5 Greek League and 4 EuroLeague games.

==== Finishing the season in Trieste ====
Gurović transferred to Pallacanestro Trieste of the Italian league where he played out the remainder of the 2000–01 season under head coach Cesare Pancotto.

=== Back to Spain: CB Málaga ===
Gurović was on the move again in the summer 2001 transfer season, returning to Spain by joining CB Málaga led by the Serbian coach Božidar Maljković.

In his first season in Andalusia, Gurović averaged 14 points per game over 32 regular season league games as Málaga grabbed the second spot ahead of playoffs. In the playoffs, the team made it to the final, getting swept 3-games-to-0 by the Duško Ivanović-coached Saski Baskonia (TAU Cerámica) featuring Dejan Tomašević, Andrés Nocioni, Luis Scola, and Fabricio Oberto.

==== Celtics pre-season camp ====
Summer 2002 would in many ways be the turning point in Gurović's career. Boston Celtics invited him to their pre-season camp during June 2002 where he appeared alongside some 30 players, including fellow Europeans Jaka Lakovič and Darius Songaila. Without much of chance to play in games mostly led by head coach Jim O'Brien's assistants, Gurović left the camp. Later that summer, twenty-six-year-old Gurović made the final FR Yugoslavia 12-man squad for the 2002 FIBA World Championship in Indianapolis. His exceptional performance against the Americans in the quarterfinals capped off with two big three-pointers in the last quarter further cemented his iconic status with Serbian fans, and also gained him a lot of attention internationally. Following the showing against the Americans, specifically the Celtics star Paul Pierce, Gurović was reportedly approached in Indianapolis by the Celtics coach Jim O'Brien, however, no deal was made again as the player had already re-signed with Málaga.

Back in Málaga for a second season, he featured in 30 ACB regular-season games averaging 10.3ppg as well as in sixteen EuroLeague games where his scoring average was 12.7ppg.

=== 2003-04 season ===
==== Cancelled pre-contract with Saski Baskonia ====
During the summer 2003 transfer window, Gurović was involved in a sequence of events and decisions that eventually led to him surprisingly returning home to play for NIS Vojvodina. Initially, the 28-year-old agreed to a pre-contract with the Duško Ivanović-coached Saski Baskonia, however, after further informing himself about coach Ivanović's gruelling training methods, Gurović decided not to join the club due to personal concerns about incurring long-term injuries as a result of Ivanović's rigid practice regiment.

==== Return home: NIS Vojvodina ====
After not showing up at Vitoria-Gasteiz following his EuroBasket 2003 participation with the Serbia-Montenegro national team, Gurović had to find a new club on a short notice with most top-team rosters around Europe already filled. He began to be courted by KK Hemofarm from Vršac, however, in a sudden turnaround in late September 2003, he decided to go with NIS Vojvodina from his hometown Novi Sad, citing a desire to be closer to his family while signing a two-year contract featuring an opt-out option following the first year. Saski Baskonia sued Gurović for not honouring his commitment to them, and the case went before FIBA's arbitration committee in Geneva that ruled in Vojvodina's favour.

Joining the roster coached by Nikola Lazić, featuring Kebu Stewart, Predrag Šuput, István Németh, Nenad Čanak, and veteran Dejan Radonjić, Gurović simultaneously competed in the Serbia-Montenegro League and Adriatic League. Midway through the season, in December 2003, he unexpectedly received another offer of potentially making the NBA when the San Antonio Spurs, whose head coach Gregg Popovich had noticed Gurović the previous summer in Indianapolis, wanted the player to join as back-up for Hedo Türkoğlu. However, being under contract with Vojvodina, Gurović was not let out of his contract.

=== 2004–05 season ===
==== Aborted transfer to UNICS ====
Following a season in his hometown, Gurović was on the move again. During late summer 2004, he agreed terms with Russian club UNICS from the Tatarstan federal subject, but after arriving in Kazan with his wife and kids in late August and early September to make living arrangements, he had a change of heart. Though satisfied with the club's organizational structure and basketball facilities, Gurović characterized things outside of basketball in Kazan as being below the level he was used to in Greece, Spain, or Serbia, specifically citing being unhappy with the apartment the club provided him with, lack of an English-language school for his kids, and general dissatisfaction with the city as the reasons not to stay in Kazan. He furthermore mentioned that the television coverage he watched while in Kazan of the unfolding Beslan school hostage crisis thousand kilometres away in another Russian city had a bad psychological effect on him that ultimately also affected his decision not to stay in Tatarstan.

==== Two months at Partizan ====
Finally, in late October 2004, Gurović signed for Serbia-Montenegro champions KK Partizan. Playing on three fronts: Serbian league (still in full format), EuroLeague, and regional Adriatic League, Gurović posted a good season. This was the first season that KK Partizan participated in the regional Balkans-wide league after years of pressure to join the competition.

Barely two weeks after signing for Partizan, Gurović became embroiled in controversy launched in the Croatian media regarding his shoulder tattoo of controversial World War II figure Draža Mihailović. Four days before Partizan's mid-November 2004 away game at Cibona, Croatian sports web portal SportNet.hr posted an editorial by Bernard Jurišić headlined "A Chetnik in Partisan Clothing is Coming for a Visit", urging the Croatian public and authorities to "stop a person sporting a tattoo of a Chetnik legend on his arm from entering Croatia". The rest of the Croatian media immediately picked up the story, further whipping up public sentiment against Gurović in the country. What followed was an official state-level reaction, with Croatia's Ministry of the Interior announcing Gurović would be turned away at the border if he tried to enter the country. Due to fears of crowd trouble when Partizan plays away in Croatia, the club decided not to take Gurović on those away trips.

In mid December 2004, less than two months after signing, Gurović and the crno-beli parted company as head coach Duško Vujošević expressed regret about "certain things that have nothing to do with basketball coming to the forefront and affecting the player's life and basketball form". A sizeable portion of the Serbian public saw the behaviour of Partizan's front office as a failure to stick up for their player, however, Gurović himself had only good things to say about his two months at Partizan including praise for the way club management, specifically sports director Dragan Todorić and coach Vujošević, treated him with his only complaints having to do with what he felt to be occasional lack of general support in Serbia from the country's basketball federation and official political circles. But, some two years later, now a member of Partizan's heated cross-town rivals Red Star, Gurović came out saying his Partizan stint was the biggest mistake of his career and that "individuals from Partizan's club management used him for their self-promotion".

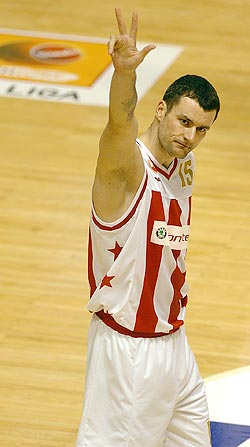
Gurović with Crvena zvezda.

==== Finishing the season at Joventut ====
In late February 2005, following a two-month layover from playing basketball, Gurović signed with Joventut Badalona thus reuniting with head coach Aíto García Reneses who had previously coached the player at Barcelona from 1998 until 2000.

=== Crvena zvezda ===
In early September 2005, Gurović signed a one-year contract with Crvena zvezda thus reuniting with head coach Dragan Šakota who took over the team months earlier. The club also acquired Pero Antić, all of which meant that it entered the season with high hopes and expectations.

Gurović led the team in ULEB Cup (now called EuroCup) during 2005–06.

He especially came into his own throughout fall 2006 at age 31, putting on great scoring displays game after game. At the end of the season Gurović led the ULEB Cup in individual scoring with 25.9 points per game, and he also dominantly won the Adriatic League's scoring title, with 28.6 points per game.

=== Season in Poland ===
Over the summer 2007 transfer window, 32-year-old Gurović signed for the Sopot-based Polish club Prokom Trefl, owned and bankrolled by the Polish billionaire Ryszard Krauze. The veteran, naturally, assumed the role of the team leader and memorably led the team to the Polish league title. His year in Poland was not without controversy either as on 25 May 2008, during game 4 of Polish Basketball League 2007–08 Playoff Finals, Gurović got involved in an infamous brawl with two players from opposing team Turów Zgorzelec - Iwo Kitzinger and Thomas Kelati. After the incident authorities of the DBE took the decision that marked him as the fight's instigator and Milan has been suspended for game 5. He was also fined PLN20,000 (about €6,000).

=== Galatasaray ===
After reportedly being a transfer target of Russian club Triumph Lyubertsy, on August 8, 2008, it was announced that Gurović signed for the Turkish club Galatasaray together with compatriot Dejan Milojević.

On Tuesday 29 September 2009, Milan Gurović announced his retirement from professional basketball. In 2015, discussing his sixteen-year playing career, Gurović listed Saša Đorđević, Juan Carlos Navarro, Dejan Bodiroga, Peja Stojaković, and Vlade Divac as the best players he's played with.

In late August 2010, following a year on the sidelines, 35-year-old Gurović entertained the idea of a return to playing, even offering his services to Crvena zvezda head coach Mihailo Uvalin. Nothing came of it in the end.

== National team career ==
Due to accepting Greek citizenship when he moved to Peristeri early in his career, Gurović's national team status remained unclear for most of the 1990s. As such, he did not feature in FR Yugoslavia youth national teams.

During summer 1998, as a sought-after player about to leave Peristeri for a top European club, 23-year-old Gurović received a Yugoslavia national team call-up from head coach Željko Obradović for the 1998 FIBA World Championship training camp. Two more Yugoslav players from the Greek League with similar legal status—Peja Stojaković and Dragan Tarlać—also received call-ups, however, unlike Gurović, they opted not to show up due to the unclear situation. Gurović, on the other hand, did, fighting for a spot on the team while simultaneously hoping for the best in terms of administrative and legal matters. In the end, despite completing the entire gruelling two-month training camp, Gurović was not allowed to compete for Yugoslavia at the World Championship due to an intervention by the Hellenic Basketball Federation president George Vassilakopoulos.

A year later, the administrative/legal issue was settled and Gurović made the Yugoslavia team at EuroBasket 1999 under the same head coach Željko Obradović. Making his national team major competition debut, the Barcelona forward had an unremarkable tournament—marked by scant playing time, occasional poor shooting that led to DNPs in subsequent games, with his only two notable outings coming in the second round-robin group games versus Spain and Russia—as the team lost in the semi-final to Boša Tanjević's Italy featuring Carlton Myers and Gregor Fučka before winning bronze medal.

Gurović has gold medals at the EuroBasket 2001 and the 2002 FIBA World Championship. He also took part in the EuroBasket 2003 and the EuroBasket 2005.

Prior to the EuroBasket 2007, he was chosen as the first captain of the newly formed senior Serbian national team, under head coach Zoran Slavnić.

== Career statistics ==
Legend
GP	Games played	GS	Games started	MPG	Minutes per game
FG%	Field-goal percentage	3P%	3-point field-goal percentage	FT%	Free-throw percentage
RPG	Rebounds per game	APG	Assists per game	SPG	Steals per game
BPG	Blocks per game	PPG	Points per game	PIR	Performance index rating
**Bold**	Career high

=== EuroLeague ===
Year	Team	GP	GS	MPG	FG%	3P%	FT%	RPG	APG	SPG	BPG	PPG	PIR
2000–01	AEK Athens	4	2	21.9	**.452**	**.400**	.783	2.5	.3	.8	.0	13.0	9.8
2001–02	Unicaja Málaga	11	8	22.7	.337	.320	.826	3.9	.6	.3	.0	11.3	9.3
2002–03	Unicaja Málaga	**16**	8	24.1	.432	.393	.820	3.4	.7	.7	**.1**	12.7	12.7
2004–05	Partizan Belgrade	6	6	27.9	.273	.235	.739	2.3	**1.0**	**1.3**	.0	9.2	3.3
2007–08	Prokom Trefl	12	**11**	**29.1**	.377	.342	**.882**	**4.8**	.9	.8	**.1**	**15.3**	**14.6**
Career		49	39	25.3	.377	.344	.824	3.7	.7	.7	.1	12.6	11.0

== Coaching career ==
Gurović began organizing basketball clinics for kids in Belgrade's Šumice sports center in December 2011.

=== Assistant at Red Star ===
When Milivoje Lazić got named the head coach of Crvena zvezda in July 2012, he selected Gurović to be his first assistant. Lazić got relieved of his duties only two games into the season, but Gurović stayed on in the same role under Lazić's replacement Vlada Vukoičić. Vukoičić wouldn't finish the season either, getting fired just before the Adriatic League Final Four in Laktaši and replaced with Dejan Radonjić. Gurović again continued on as assistant coach, finishing the season in that role, as Crvena zvezda again failed to win either the Adriatic or the Serbian title.

=== Head coaching debut: KK FMP ===
In late June 2013, Gurović got named the head coach of FMP, Crvena zvezda's feeder club competing in the Basketball League of Serbia (KLS).

==== 2013–14 season ====
In his debut season behind the bench, Gurović's FMP team led by a couple of somewhat experienced journeymen — 25-year-old Slobodan Dunđerski and 24-year-old Filip Čović — in addition to talented 19-year-old Nikola Čvorović as well 18-year-olds Đorđe Kaplanović, Marko Gudurić, and Brano Đukanović finished the First League stage of the campaign on top with a 20–6 record, ahead of Crnokosa, Metalac Valjevo, and Borac Čačak, thus qualifying for the Super League stage.

On 7 February 2014 Gurović's FMP pulled out a famous win over favourites KK Partizan in the Serbian Cup quarterfinal: an 85–79 overtime triumph behind Nikola Čvorović's 27 points. The win was still seen as a significant upset despite injury-riddled Partizan fielding a makeshift squad half of which consisted of junior players as proud Gurovic praised his players. In its semifinal versus the Dejan Milojević-coached Mega Basket team, FMP led by 5 at the half on the back of its strong second quarter showing, but collapsed in the third and—despite some improvement in the fourth—lost the game 85–93 as towards the end of the contest Gurović reacted explosively to verbal abuse (he would later reveal consisted of insults against his family) from several spectators behind his bench who were ejected from the arena as a result.

Competing in the eight-team Super League against Serbian clubs from the Adriatic League (Red Star, Partizan, Mega, and Radnički Kragujevac) as well its three First League competitors, FMP managed a 5–9 record that was good enough for 5th spot, just outside a playoff berth. Due to FMP's association with Red Star and Gurović's personal past with Partizan fans as well as FMP's cup win earlier in the season, both of FMP's Super League games against Partizan were especially memorable. The teams met again on 2 June 2014 in Hala sportova with FMP leading throughout the nervy contest and building a 17-point lead heading into the final quarter before Partizan shifted into a higher gear and out shot their opposition 34–13 in the fourth quarter for an 86–82 win. Gurović was targeted throughout the match by Partizan fans and the arena erupted when he pushed Boris Dallo, a move that resulted in an automatic ejection from the sidelines as Partizan coach Duško Vujošević even took to the public address microphone, imploring home fans to calm down.

== Personal life ==
Like a number of Serbian professional basketball players who transferred to the Greek Basket League clubs during the early 1990s—including Dragan Tarlać, Peja Stojaković, Dušan Vukčević, Dušan Jelić, Rasho Nesterović, Miroslav Pecarski, and Marko Jarić—in addition to his native country Serbia, Gurović also holds Greek citizenship, which he obtained for practical reasons of playing without EU administrative restrictions in the Greek Basket League. At the time, Gurović played for Peristeri, where he started his basketball career. In order to get Greek citizenship, his last name was changed; he thus competed under the name Milan Malatras while he was in Greece. The name change was required, as it reflected the citizenship documents submitted. There are rumors that these documents were often falsified, and subject to counterfeiting.

Other than his Draža Mihailović tattoo, Gurović has a tattooed eagle right above it.

Serbian writer Biljana Srbljanović referred to Gurović as "that tattooed fool" in her online exchange with Nebojša Krstić, the adviser to President of Serbia at her blog. When informed and asked by daily tabloid Kurir about Srbljanović's online comments, Gurović responded: "For her information, that 'tattooed fool' speaks, besides Serbian, three foreign languages. I know who this writer is and feel very sorry for her. Women of her age can do or say foolish stuff sometimes if they don't get their portion of cock in the morning. She must've awoken unfucked that day when she said this."

=== Targeted by Partizan fans ===
One year prior to signing with Red Star Belgrade in September 2005, Gurović had been a member of their arch-rivals Partizan Belgrade. As a result, once he joined Red Star, he began to be targeted by the Partizan fans, Grobari, who suddenly turned on him having previously supported him strongly during the forward's Croatia entry ban when he was with Partizan. The antagonism culminated during the 2007 Serbian league playoff final when the Grobari chanted insults and provocations from the stands targeting Milan's wife, children and parents. Milan responded and in TV interview said that "Grobari are cattle". In the second game, when Red Star were hosts, incidents occurred on the stands between Red Star fans Delije and police. Gurović tried to calm Red Star supporters and to defend them from police. Delije chanted "You are Zvezda's chetnik Milan" (Serbian : "Ti si Zvezdin Četnik Milane") and Gurović cried. In the third game, Grobari used Milan's tears as provocation. Partizan won the series 3–1, becoming Serbian champions.

Gurović was elected on 5-year term as a member of the Assembly of the Crvena zvezda Basketball Club on 27 December 2021.

== See also ==
- List of KK Crvena zvezda players with 100 games played

Sporting positions
Preceded by Igor Rakočević	Serbia captain 2007	Succeeded by Nenad Krstić
