= List of ABA League–winning coaches =

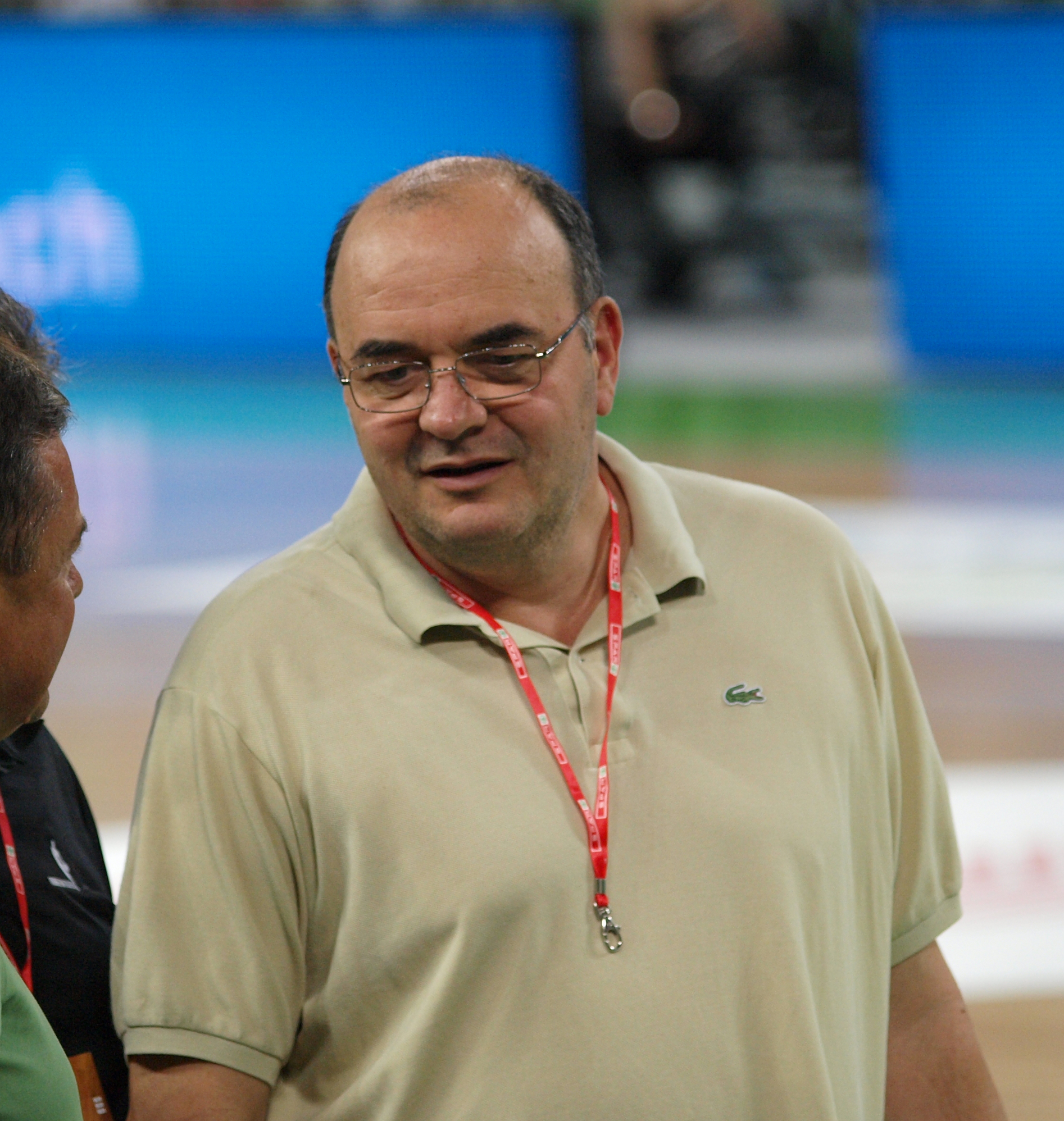
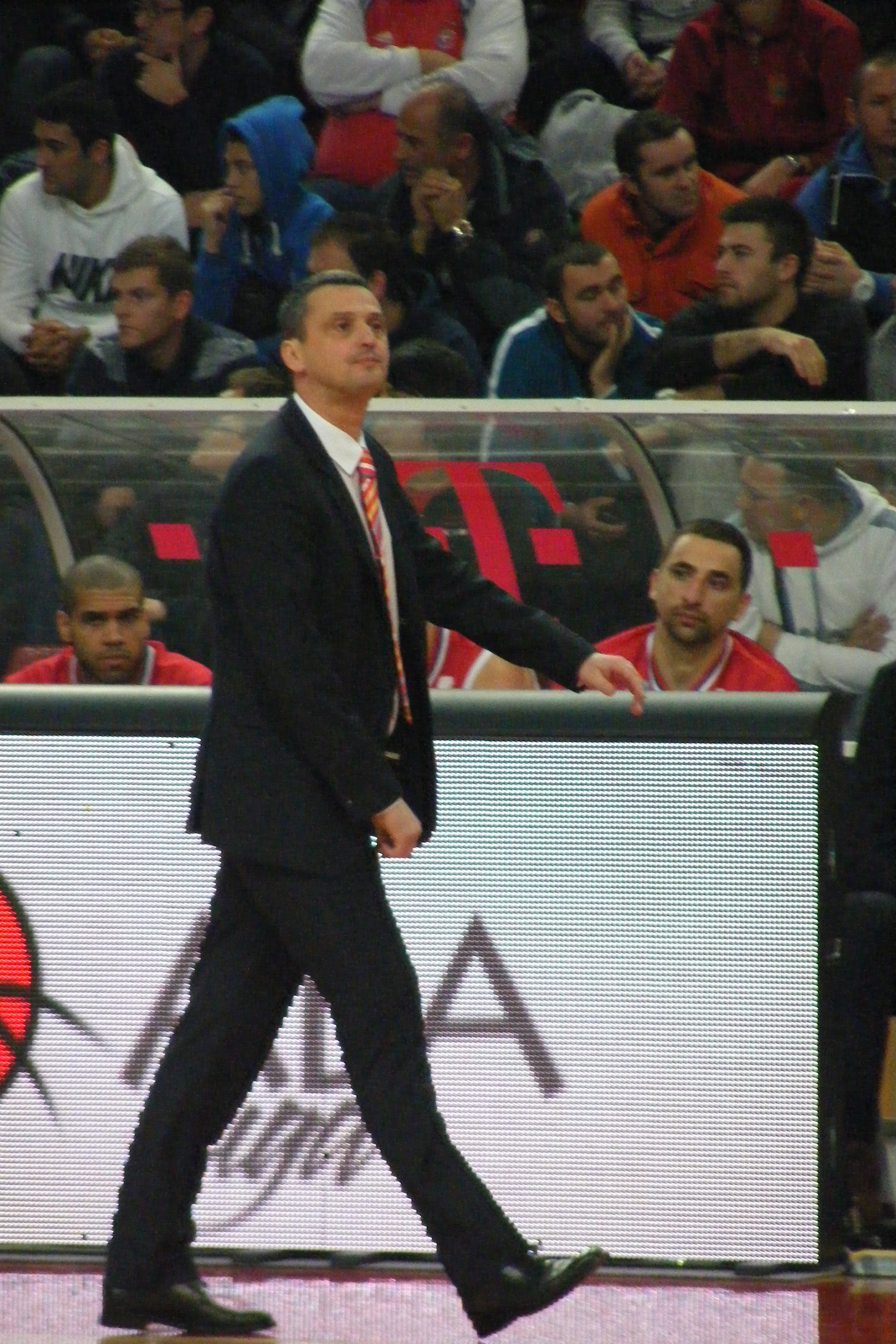
Duško Vujošević and Dejan Radonjić won five ABA League titles each, with KK Partizan and KK Crvena zvezda, respectively.

The list of ABA League-winning coaches shows all head coaches who won the Adriatic League, the Adriatic Basketball Association-run regional men's professional basketball league that features clubs from former Yugoslavia (Bosnia and Herzegovina, Croatia, Montenegro, North Macedonia, Serbia, and Slovenia) along with an occasional club outside of that territory.

== List of winners ==
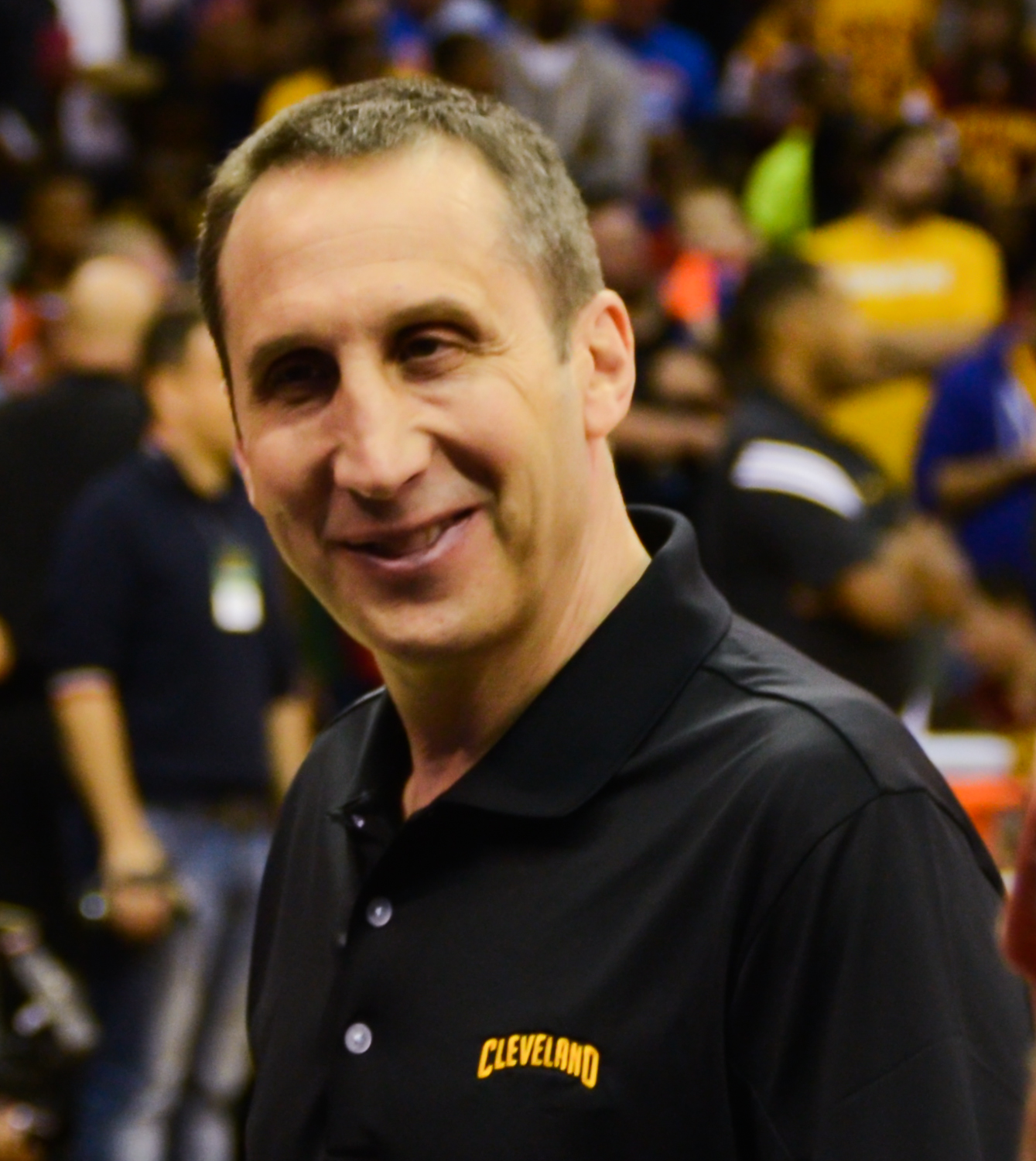
Israeli coach David Blatt is the only coach outside of the former Yugoslavia to win the title.

Tournament	Coach	Winning team	Ref.
2001–02	(Slovenia) Zmago Sagadin	(Slovenia) Union Olimpija	
2002–03	(Croatia) Danijel Jusup	(Croatia) Zadar	
2003–04	(Serbia and Montenegro) Boško Đokić	(Serbia and Montenegro) FMP (Reflex)	
2004–05	(Serbia and Montenegro) Željko Lukajić	(Serbia and Montenegro) Hemofarm	
2005–06	(Serbia and Montenegro) Vlada Vukoičić	(Serbia and Montenegro) FMP	
2006–07	(Montenegro) Duško Vujošević	(Serbia) Partizan	
2007–08	(Montenegro) Duško Vujošević (2)	(Serbia) Partizan Igokea	
2008–09	(Montenegro) Duško Vujošević (3)	(Serbia) Partizan Igokea	
2009–10	(Montenegro) Duško Vujošević (4)	(Serbia) Partizan	
2010–11	(Serbia) Vlada Jovanović	(Serbia) Partizan	
2011–12	(Israel) David Blatt	(Israel) Maccabi Tel Aviv	
2012–13	(Montenegro) Duško Vujošević (5)	(Serbia) Partizan m:ts	
2013–14	(Croatia) Slaven Rimac	(Croatia) Cibona	
2014–15	(Montenegro) Dejan Radonjić	(Serbia) Crvena zvezda Telekom	
2015–16	(Montenegro) Dejan Radonjić (2)	(Serbia) Crvena zvezda Telekom	
2016–17	(Montenegro) Dejan Radonjić (3)	(Serbia) Crvena zvezda mts	
2017–18	(Serbia) Aleksandar Džikić	(Montenegro) Budućnost VOLI	
2018–19	(Serbia) Milan Tomić	(Serbia) Crvena zvezda mts	
2019–20	Canceled due to COVID-19 pandemic in Europe		
2020–21	(Montenegro) Dejan Radonjić (4)	(Serbia) Crvena zvezda mts	
2021–22	(Montenegro) Dejan Radonjić (5)	(Serbia) Crvena zvezda mts	
2022–23	(Serbia) Željko Obradović	(Serbia) Partizan Mozzart Bet	
2023–24	(Greece) Ioannis Sfairopoulos	(Serbia) Crvena zvezda mts	

== Multiple winners ==
Number	Coach	Winning team(s)	First	Last
5	(Montenegro) Duško Vujošević	(Serbia) Partizan	2007	2013
5	(Montenegro) Dejan Radonjić	(Serbia) Crvena zvezda	2015	2022

== See also ==
- List of Serbian League-winning coaches
