= 2014–15 ABA League =

ABA League
- Season: 2014–15
- Duration: October 3, 2014 – March 22, 2015 (Regular season); April 14–30, 2015 (Playoffs)
- Teams: 14
- TV partners: BNT; Doma TV; Happy TV; MKTV; RTCG; RTRS; Sport 1 Sport Klub; Šport TV

Regular season
- Top seed: (Serbia) Crvena Zvezda Telekom
- Season MVP: (Serbia) Nikola Jokić (Mega Leks)
- Relegated: (Bulgaria) Levski Sofia

Finals
- Champions: (Serbia) Crvena Zvezda Telekom; 1st title
- Runners-up: (Croatia) Cedevita
- Semi-finalists: (Montenegro) Budućnost (Serbia) Partizan
- Finals MVP: (Serbia) Boban Marjanović (Crvena Zvezda)

Statistical leaders
Points	(United States) Malcolm Armstead (Krka)	17.5
Rebounds	(Serbia) Nikola Jokić (Mega Leks)	9.2
Assists	(Serbia) Nenad Miljenović (Mega Leks)	8.3

The 2014–15 ABA League was the 14th season of the ABA League, with 14 teams from Serbia, Slovenia, Montenegro, Croatia, Bosnia and Herzegovina, North Macedonia, Hungary and Bulgaria participating in it.

Regular season started on October 3, 2014, and lasted until March 22, 2015, followed by playoffs of the four best placed teams.

== Team information ==
Country	Teams	Team	City	Venue (Capacity)
Serbia	4			
Serbia	4	Crvena Zvezda	Belgrade	Pionir Hall (8,150)
Serbia	4	Mega Leks	Sremska Mitrovica	Sports Hall Pinki (3,000)
Serbia	4	Metalac Farmakom	Valjevo	Valjevo Sports Hall (2,500)
Serbia	4	Partizan	Belgrade	Pionir Hall (8,150)
Croatia	3			
Croatia	3	Cibona	Zagreb	Dražen Petrović Basketball Hall (5,400)
Croatia	3	Cedevita	Zagreb	Mala dvorana Doma sportova (4,000)
Croatia	3	Zadar	Zadar	Krešimir Ćosić Hall (9,000)
Slovenia	2			
Slovenia	2	Krka	Novo mesto	Leon Štukelj Hall (3,000)
Slovenia	2	Union Olimpija	Ljubljana	Arena Stožice (12,480)
Bosnia and Herzegovina	1	Igokea	Aleksandrovac	Laktaši Sports Hall (3,000)
Bulgaria	1	Levski Sofia	Sofia	Universiada Hall (3,000)
Hungary	1	Szolnoki Olaj	Szolnok	Tiszaligeti Sportcsarnok (3,000)
(North Macedonia) Macedonia	1	MZT Skopje Aerodrom	Skopje	Jane Sandanski Arena (6,500)
Montenegro	1	Budućnost VOLI	Podgorica	Morača Sports Center (5,000)

Location of teams in the ABA League 2014–15 (former Yugoslavia)
Location of teams in the 2014–15 ABA League (Hungary)
Location of teams in the 2014–15 ABA League (Bulgaria)

=== Head coaches ===
Team	Head coach
Budućnost VOLI	(Montenegro) Igor Jovović
Cedevita	(Croatia) Jasmin Repeša
Cibona	(Croatia) Slaven Rimac
Crvena Zvezda	(Montenegro) Dejan Radonjić
Igokea	(Serbia) Željko Lukajić
Krka	(Serbia) Aleksandar Džikić
Levski	(Bulgaria) Konstantin Papazov
Mega Leks	(Serbia) Dejan Milojević
Metalac Farmakom	(Serbia) Vladimir Đokić
MZT Skopje Aerodrom	(Slovenia) Aleš Pipan
Partizan	(Montenegro) Duško Vujošević
Szolnoki Olaj	(Serbia) Dragan Aleksić
Union Olimpija	(Slovenia) Memi Bečirovič
Zadar	(Croatia) Ante Nazor

=== Coaching changes ===
Week	Club	Outgoing coach	Date of change	Incoming coach
3rd	MZT Skopje Aerodrom	(Slovenia) Zmago Sagadin	16 October 2014	(North Macedonia) Vrbica Stefanov
7th	MZT Skopje Aerodrom	(North Macedonia) Vrbica Stefanov	5 November 2014	(North Macedonia) Boban Mitev
9th	Igokea	(Serbia) Vlada Jovanović	26 November 2014	(Serbia) Željko Lukajić
16th	MZT Skopje Aerodrom	(North Macedonia) Boban Mitev	6 January 2015	(North Macedonia) Aleksandar Jončevski
22nd	Union Olimpija	(Slovenia) Aleš Pipan	22 February 2015	(Slovenia) Memi Bečirovič
22nd	MZT Skopje Aerodrom	(North Macedonia) Aleksandar Jončevski	27 February 2015	(Slovenia) Aleš Pipan

== Regular season ==
The regular season began on October 3, 2014, and ended on March 22, 2015.

=== Standings ===
Pos	Team	Pld	W	L	PF	PA	PD	Pts	Qualification or relegation
1	(Serbia) Crvena Zvezda	26	24	2	2147	1790	+357	50	Qualification to playoffs
2	(Montenegro) Budućnost VOLI	26	19	7	1993	1816	+177	45	Qualification to playoffs
3	(Croatia) Cedevita	26	18	8	2004	1838	+166	44	Qualification to playoffs
4	(Serbia) Partizan	26	18	8	1924	1778	+146	44	Qualification to playoffs
5	(Slovenia) Union Olimpija	26	15	11	1952	1849	+103	41	
6	(Serbia) Metalac Farmakom	26	13	13	1852	1936	−84	39	
7	(Hungary) Szolnoki Olaj	26	12	14	1863	1922	−59	38	
8	(Croatia) Zadar	26	12	14	1861	1931	−70	38	
9	(Slovenia) Krka	26	12	14	1894	1877	+17	38	
10	(Serbia) Mega Leks	26	11	15	2148	2148	0	37	
11	(Croatia) Cibona	26	10	16	1934	2033	−99	36	
12	(Bosnia and Herzegovina) Igokea	26	9	17	1866	1912	−46	35	
13	(North Macedonia) MZT Skopje Aerodrom	26	7	19	1775	1938	−163	33	
14	(Bulgaria) Levski Sofia	26	2	24	1698	2143	−445	28	Relegated

Source: ABA League

=== Schedule and results ===
Home \ Away	BUD	CDV	CIB	CZV	IGK	KRK	LEV	MEG	MET	MZT	PAR	SZO	UOL	ZDR
(Montenegro) Budućnost		70–80	101–79	76–77	87–72	82–77	20–0 (Note: Decision, round 17 – Budućnost won 20:0)	88–80	65–61	96–69	85–79	75–68	76–61	71–63
(Croatia) Cedevita	80–70		81–79	87–88	68–64	100–75	86–68	103–107	79–66	81–70	70–50	74–73	66–60	71–74
(Croatia) Cibona	67–84	69–71		64–88	78–81	76–81	85–69	84–80	93–91	70–61	64–81	96–92	80–85	77–76
(Serbia) Crvena Zvezda	83–69	78–63	80–64		76–71	85–78	85–55	93–77	82–59	89–56	76–67	90–47	73–65	93–66
(Bosnia and Herzegovina) Igokea	62–70	57–86	61–71	80–85		66–53	87–54	70–63	72–75	61–76	83–77	66–71	83–77	71–56
(Slovenia) Krka	81–90	80–72	70–80	77–67	78–67		72–61	72–80	89–59	85–52	72–78	61–71	71–54	83–80
(Bulgaria) Levski	75–92	78–95	64–74	58–99	77–92	68–70		98–89	66–77	91–90	66–98	61–82	56–78	72–80
(Serbia) Mega Leks	96–84	55–81	78–74	75–77	100–96	81–67	89–68		99–82	103–95	73–75	80–85	85–66	91–84
(Serbia) Metalac	70–69	56–55	67–66	74–82	81–68	69–67	81–54	86–83		69–67	72–83	72–65	67–76	87–93
(North Macedonia) MZT	65–81	61–76	78–65	76–79	76–80	60–72	72–61	84–79	58–64		55–63	74–58	57–76	72–58
(Serbia) Partizan	61–72	76–64	73–64	77–63	74–65	64–68	94–66	89–80	84–77	65–50		62–55	81–74	87–53
(Hungary) Szolnok	72–81	67–74	89–87	65–89	63–60	63–59	81–67	88–77	67–51	73–76	55–60		106–99	82–81
(Slovenia) Union Olimpija	77–66	77–67	74–77	81–91	72–70	73–67	89–70	85–75	69–70	69–56	87–58	79–61		82–60
(Croatia) Zadar	61–73	70–74	77–51	63–79	68–61	79–69	86–75	74–73	85–69	74–69	69–68	71–64	60–67	

Legend: Blue = home team win; Red = away team win.

== Playoffs ==
Semifinals
1	(Serbia) Crvena Zvezda	73	68	95	81
4	(Serbia) Partizan	64	70	85	73
2	(Montenegro) Budućnost VOLI	82	81	57	85	66
3	(Croatia) Cedevita	81	76	85	88	70

Finals
(Serbia) Crvena Zvezda	68	69	62	89
(Croatia) Cedevita	59	65	72	79

=== Semifinals ===
The semifinals will be played in April 2015. Teams 1 & 2 will host Games 1 and 2, plus Game 5 if it is necessary. Teams 3 & 4 will host Game 3, plus Game 4 if it is necessary.

==== Game 1 ====
14 April 2015
18:30

Report

Budućnost VOLI (Montenegro)	82–81	(Croatia) Cedevita
Scoring by quarter: 20–23, 19–21, 20–16, 23–21
Pts: Savović 20; Rebs: Šehović 9 Asts: Cook 5		Pts: Babić 14; Rebs: Delaš 8 Asts: Barać, Gordić 4

Morača Sports Center, Podgorica
Attendance: 3,250
Referees: Ilija Belošević, Matej Boltauzer, Saša Maričić

14 April 2015
21:00

Report

Crvena Zvezda (Serbia)	73–64	(Serbia) Partizan
Scoring by quarter: 24–13, 14–18, 17–21, 18–12
Pts: Jenkins 19; Rebs: Marjanović 9 Asts: Williams, Kalinić 3		Pts: Mačvan 12; Rebs: Mačvan 12; Asts: Mačvan 5

Pionir Hall, Belgrade
Attendance: 5,932
Referees: Sreten Radović, Milivoje Jovčić, Damir Javor

==== Game 2 ====
15 April 2015
18:30

Report

Budućnost VOLI (Montenegro)	81–76	(Croatia) Cedevita
Scoring by quarter: 26–24, 13–15, 22–20, 20–17
Pts: Savović 22; Rebs: Šehović 7 Asts: Cook 11		Pts: Gordić 17; Rebs: Babić 6 Asts: Ukić 4

Morača Sports Center, Podgorica
Attendance: 4,100
Referees: Milivoje Jovčić, Damir Javor, Mario Majkič

15 April 2015
21:00

Report

Crvena Zvezda (Serbia)	68–70	(Serbia) Partizan
Scoring by quarter: 17–22, 18–20, 13–16, 20–12
Pts: Jenkins 19; Rebs: Marjanović 8 Asts: Williams 3		Pts: Mačvan 14; Rebs: Mačvan 17; Asts: Milutinov 4

Pionir Hall, Belgrade
Attendance: 5,983
Referees: Srđan Dožai, Matej Boltauzer, Siniša Herceg

==== Game 3 ====
18 April 2015
18:30

Report

Cedevita (Croatia)	85–57	(Montenegro) Budućnost VOLI
Scoring by quarter: 15–29, 26–12, 17–4, 27–12
Pts: Gordić, Tomas 14; Rebs: Barać 6 Asts: Gordić 6		Pts: Dašić 9 Rebs: Šehović 5 Asts: Cook 4

Dom Sportova, Zagreb
Attendance: 2,950
Referees: Saša Pukl, Marko Juras, Sašo Petek

18 April 2015
21:00

Report

Partizan (Serbia)	85–95	(Serbia) Crvena Zvezda
Scoring by quarter: 20–26, 24–25, 18–22, 23–22
Pts: Milosavljević 23; Rebs: Mačvan 5 Asts: Tepić 3		Pts: Kalinić 25; Rebs: Mitrović 9 Asts: Mitrović 5

Pionir Hall, Belgrade
Attendance: 7,000
Referees: Ilija Belošević, Sreten Radović, Damir Javor

==== Game 4 ====
19 April 2015
19:00

Report

Cedevita (Croatia)	88–85	(Montenegro) Budućnost VOLI
Scoring by quarter: 18–19, 22–17, 23–19, 25–30
Pts: Gordić, Ukić 16; Rebs: Barać 7 Asts: Ukić, Tomas 4		Pts: Planinić, Reynolds 13; Rebs: Vitkovac 7 Asts: Reynolds, Savović 3

Dom Sportova, Zagreb
Attendance: 3,050
Referees: Ilija Belošević, Matej Boltauzer, Uroš Obrknežević

19 April 2015
21:00

Report

Partizan (Serbia)	73–81	(Serbia) Crvena Zvezda
Scoring by quarter: 24–22, 12–16, 22–26, 15–17
Pts: Murić 25; Rebs: Milutinov 8 Asts: Murić, Milosavljević 3		Pts: Williams, Jenkins 19; Rebs: Marjanović 14; Asts: 3 players 3
Crvena Zvezda wins series by 3–1

Pionir Hall, Belgrade
Attendance: 7,000
Referees: Saša Pukl, Sašo Petek, Tomislav Hordov

==== Game 5 ====
22 April 2015
18:30

Report

Budućnost VOLI (Montenegro)	66–70	(Croatia) Cedevita
Scoring by quarter: 14–15, 19–24, 17–14, 16–17
Pts: Planinić, Reynolds 13; Rebs: Savović 7 Asts: Cook 7		Pts: Bilan 16; Rebs: Tomas 6 Asts: Ukić 6
Cedevita wins series by 3–2

Morača Sports Center, Podgorica
Attendance: 4,300
Referees: Damir Javor, Saša Maričić, Mario Majkič

=== Finals ===
==== Game 1 ====
25 April 2015
21:00

Report

Crvena Zvezda (Serbia)	68–59	(Croatia) Cedevita
Scoring by quarter: 24–9, 18–15, 12–20, 14–15
Pts: Mitrović 18; Rebs: Marjanović 12; Asts: Williams 5		Pts: Babić 12; Rebs: Bilan 8 Asts: Žganec, Ukić 4

Pionir Hall, Belgrade
Attendance: 5,526
Referees: Saša Pukl, Zdravko Rutešić, Miloš Koljenšić

==== Game 2 ====
26 April 2015
20:30

Report

Crvena Zvezda (Serbia)	69–65	(Croatia) Cedevita
Scoring by quarter: 22–8, 18–24, 18–16, 11–17
Pts: Marjanović 20; Rebs: Marjanović 14; Asts: Marjanović 5		Pts: Babić 14; Rebs: Žganec 8 Asts: Ukić 10

Pionir Hall, Belgrade
Attendance: 5,405
Referees: Matej Boltauzer, Sašo Petek, Mario Majkič

==== Game 3 ====
29 April 2015
20:30

Report

Cedevita (Croatia)	72–62	(Serbia) Crvena Zvezda
Scoring by quarter: 23–16, 18–17, 27–13, 4–16
Pts: Barać 15; Rebs: Zubčić, Žganec 6 Asts: Ukić 4		Pts: Marjanović 16; Rebs: Kalinić 7 Asts: Mitrović 2

Dom Sportova, Zagreb
Attendance: 3,100
Referees: Matej Boltauzer, Damir Javor, Miloš Koljenšić

==== Game 4 ====
30 April 2015
20:30

Report

Cedevita (Croatia)	79–89	(Serbia) Crvena Zvezda
Scoring by quarter: 25–30, 10–22, 23–17, 21–20
Pts: Zubčić 15; Rebs: Barać 4 Asts: Gordić 4		Pts: Jenkins 17; Rebs: Kalinić 8 Asts: 4 players 3
Crvena Zvezda wins series by 3–1

Dom Sportova, Zagreb
Attendance: 3,050
Referees: Saša Pukl, Sašo Petek, Mario Majkič

2014–15 ABA League Champions
(Serbia)
Crvena Zvezda
1st title

== Attendances ==
=== Average home attendances ===
Pos	Team	GP	Average	High	Low	Annual chg in avg
1	(Serbia) Partizan	15	6,067	7,000	2,500	5 %
2	(Serbia) Crvena Zvezda	17	4,201	5,983	2,237	47 %
3	(Croatia) Zadar	13	3,054	5,000	1,500	9 %
4	(Montenegro) Budućnost VOLI	15	2,881	5,100	1,580	15 %
5	(North Macedonia) MZT Skopje Aerodrom	13	2,529	5,123	900	-21 %
6	(Slovenia) Union Olimpija	13	2,269	5,000	1,000	12 %
7	(Serbia) Mega Leks	13	1,762	2,500	800	38 %
8	(Croatia) Cedevita	17	1,480	3,100	400	-1 %
9	(Serbia) Metalac Farmakom	13	1,446	2,000	800	NA
10	(Bosnia and Herzegovina) Igokea	13	1,400	3,000	500	1 %
11	(Slovenia) Krka	13	1,258	2,000	800	-6 %
12	(Hungary) Szolnoki Olaj	13	1,250	1,500	1,000	-20 %
13	(Bulgaria) Levski Sofia	11	1,145	3,000	300	NA
14	(Croatia) Cibona	13	1,000	2,000	500	-53 %

== Stats leaders ==
=== MVP Round by Round ===
Round	Player	Team	Efficiency
1	(Serbia) Nikola Jokić	(Serbia) Mega Leks	44
2	(United States) Marcus Williams	(Serbia) Crvena Zvezda	29
3	(United States) James Florence	(Croatia) Zadar	31
4	(Serbia) Luka Mitrović	(Serbia) Crvena Zvezda	34
5	(Serbia) Nenad Miljenović	(Serbia) Mega Leks	34
6	(Serbia) Nikola Jokić (2)	(Serbia) Mega Leks	40
7	(Serbia) Nikola Jevtović	(Serbia) Metalac Farmakom	28
8	(Croatia) Josip Sobin	(Croatia) Zadar	36
9	(Hungary) Dávid Vojvoda	(Hungary) Szolnoki Olaj	34
10	(Croatia) Damir Markota	(Croatia) Cibona	28
11	(Serbia) Andrija Bojić	(Serbia) Mega Leks	29
12	(Serbia) Nenad Miljenović (2)	(Serbia) Mega Leks	30
13	(Croatia) Josip Sobin (2)	(Croatia) Zadar	31
14	(Serbia) Nikola Kalinić	(Serbia) Crvena Zvezda	32
15	(Croatia) Josip Sobin (3)	(Croatia) Zadar	38
16	(Serbia) Nenad Miljenović (3)	(Serbia) Mega Leks	33
17	(Serbia) Milan Mačvan	(Serbia) Partizan	30
18	(United States) Chris Booker	(Slovenia) Krka	30
19	(Hungary) Dávid Vojvoda (2)	(Hungary) Szolnoki Olaj	31
20	(Croatia) Miro Bilan	(Croatia) Cedevita	31
21	(Serbia) Nikola Jokić (3)	(Serbia) Mega Leks	37
22	(Serbia) Nenad Miljenović (4)	(Serbia) Mega Leks	35
23	(Serbia) Dejan Musli	(Serbia) Mega Leks	40
24	(Slovenia) Alen Omić	(Slovenia) Union Olimpija	40
25	(Serbia) Nenad Miljenović (5)	(Serbia) Mega Leks	38
26	(Serbia) Nikola Jokić (4)	(Serbia) Mega Leks	39
SF game 1	(Montenegro) Boris Savović	(Montenegro) Budućnost	24
SF game 2	(Serbia) Milan Mačvan (2)	(Serbia) Partizan	28
SF game 3	(Serbia) Nikola Kalinić (2)	(Serbia) Crvena Zvezda	29
SF game 4	(Slovenia) Edo Murić	(Serbia) Partizan	33
SF game 5	(Croatia) Miro Bilan (2)	(Croatia) Cedevita	19
F game 1	(Serbia) Boban Marjanović	(Serbia) Crvena Zvezda	24
F game 2	(Serbia) Boban Marjanović (2)	(Serbia) Crvena Zvezda	39
F game 3	(Serbia) Boban Marjanović (3)	(Serbia) Crvena Zvezda	18
F game 4	(United States) Charles Jenkins	(Serbia) Crvena Zvezda	19

=== MVP of the Month ===
Month	Player	Team	Ref.
October 2014	(Serbia) Nenad Miljenović	(Serbia) Mega Leks	
November 2014	(Serbia) Boban Marjanović	(Serbia) Crvena zvezda	
December 2014	(Croatia) Josip Sobin	(Croatia) Zadar	
January 2015	(Serbia) Milan Mačvan	(Serbia) Partizan	
February 2015	(Serbia) Nikola Jokić	(Serbia) Mega Leks	
March 2015	(Montenegro) Boris Savović	(Montenegro) Budućnost VOLI	

=== Ranking MVP ===
Rank	Name	Team	Efficiency	Games	Average
1.	(Serbia) Nikola Jokić	(Serbia) Mega Leks	527	24	21.96
2.	(Serbia) Nenad Miljenović	(Serbia) Mega Leks	521	24	21.71
3.	(Croatia) Josip Sobin	(Croatia) Zadar	467	24	19.46
4.	(Croatia) Miro Bilan	(Croatia) Cedevita	480	26	18.46
5.	(Serbia) Milan Mačvan	(Serbia) Partizan	372	21	17.71

=== Points ===
Rank	Name	Team	Points	Games	PPG
1.	(United States) Malcolm Armstead	(Slovenia) Krka	439	25	17.56
2.	(Serbia) Nikola Jokić	(Serbia) Mega Leks	370	26	15.42
3.	(United States) James Florence	(Croatia) Zadar	352	23	15.30
4.	(Hungary) Dávid Vojvoda	(Hungary) Szolnoki Olaj	366	25	14.64
5.	(Croatia) Miro Bilan	(Croatia) Cedevita	353	26	14.58

=== Rebounds ===
Rank	Name	Team	Rebounds	Games	RPG
1.	(Serbia) Nikola Jokić	(Serbia) Mega Leks	222	24	9.25
2.	(Croatia) Josip Sobin	(Croatia) Zadar	208	24	8.67
3.	(North Macedonia) Predrag Samardžiski	(North Macedonia) MZT Skopje	120	14	8.57
4.	(Serbia) Nikola Milutinov	(Serbia) Partizan	198	25	7.92
5.	(United States) Chris Booker	(Slovenia) Krka	195	25	7.80

=== Assists ===
Rank	Name	Team	Assists	Games	APG
1.	(Serbia) Nenad Miljenović	(Serbia) Mega Leks	201	24	8.38
2.	(United States) Omar Cook	(Montenegro) Budućnost	147	23	6.39
3.	(United States) Marcus Williams	(Serbia) Crvena zvezda	121	22	5.50
4.	(Serbia) Marko Marinović	(Slovenia) Union Olimpija	127	26	4.88
5.	(Bosnia and Herzegovina) Nemanja Gordić	(Croatia) Cedevita	104	24	4.33

== The ideal five and coach of the season ==
The ideal five of the season were selected by fans and head coaches of the ABA League teams, with both contributing 50% of the final result for every playing position.

Position	Name	Team
PG	(United States) Malcolm Armstead	(Slovenia) Krka
SG	(Montenegro) Suad Šehović	(Montenegro) Budućnost
SF	(Serbia) Aleksandar Pavlović	(Serbia) Partizan
PF	(Serbia) Milan Mačvan	(Serbia) Partizan
C	(Serbia) Boban Marjanović	(Serbia) Crvena zvezda
Coach	(Montenegro) Dejan Radonjić	(Serbia) Crvena zvezda

== ABA League clubs in European competitions ==
Team	Competition	Progress
(Serbia) Crvena Zvezda	Euroleague	Top 16
(Croatia) Cedevita	Eurocup	Eighthfinals
(Montenegro) Budućnost VOLI	Eurocup	Last 32
(Slovenia) Union Olimpija	Eurocup	Last 32
(Serbia) Partizan	Eurocup	Regular Season
(Hungary) Szolnoki Olaj	Eurocup	Regular Season
