= List of BLS-winning head coaches =

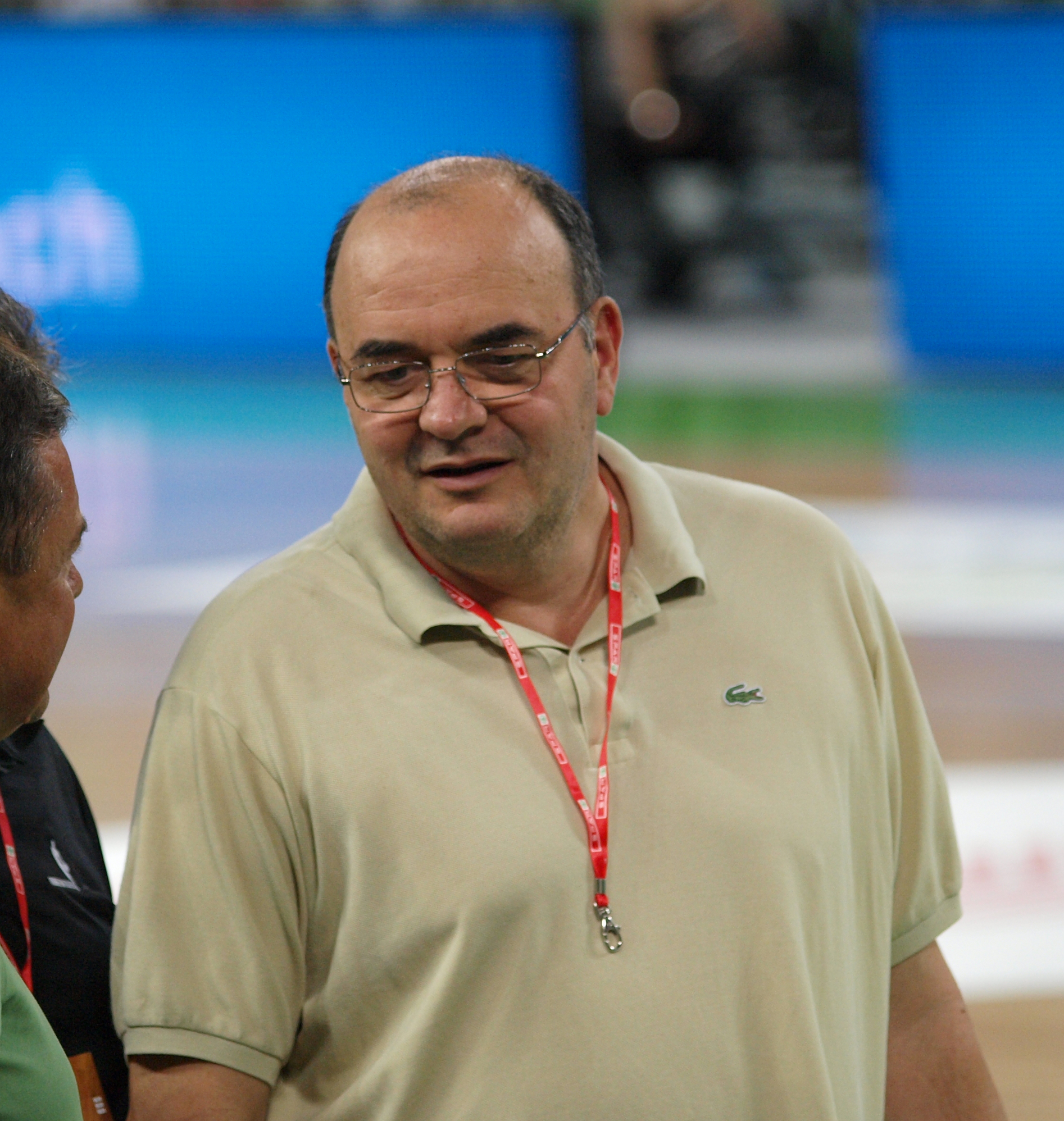
Duško Vujošević won the record six titles with Partizan.

The list of BLS-winning head coaches shows all head coaches who won the Basketball League of Serbia, the top-tier national men's professional basketball league based in Serbia.

== Winners ==
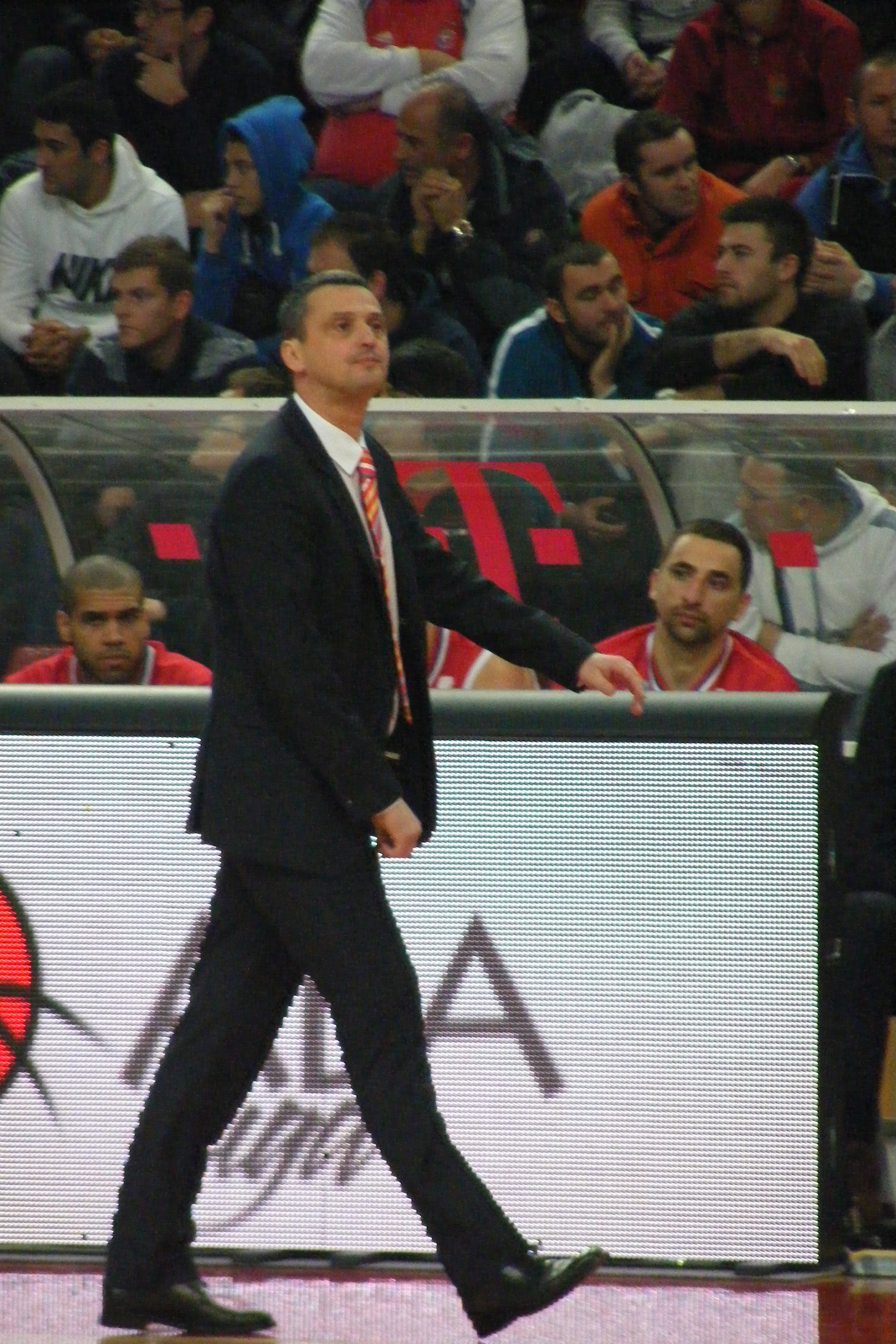
Dejan Radonjić won the title five times with Crvena zvezda.

| Season | Head coach | Team | Ref. |
|---|---|---|---|
| 2006–07 | (Montenegro) Duško Vujošević | Partizan | |
| 2007–08 | (Montenegro) Duško Vujošević (2) | Partizan Igokea | |
| 2008–09 | (Montenegro) Duško Vujošević (3) | Partizan Igokea | |
| 2009–10 | (Montenegro) Duško Vujošević (4) | Partizan | |
| 2010–11 | (Serbia) Vlada Jovanović | Partizan | |
| 2011–12 | (Serbia) Vlada Jovanović (2) | Partizan mt:s | |
| 2012–13 | (Montenegro) Duško Vujošević (5) | Partizan mt:s | |
| 2013–14 | (Montenegro) Duško Vujošević (6) | Partizan | |
| 2014–15 | (Montenegro) Dejan Radonjić | Crvena zvezda Telekom | |
| 2015–16 | (Montenegro) Dejan Radonjić (2) | Crvena zvezda Telekom | |
| 2016–17 | (Montenegro) Dejan Radonjić (3) | Crvena zvezda mts | |
| 2017–18 | (Serbia) Milenko Topić | Crvena zvezda mts | |
| 2018–19 | (Serbia) Milan Tomić | Crvena zvezda mts | |
| 2019–20 | Canceled due to COVID-19 pandemic in Serbia | | |
| 2020–21 | (Montenegro) Dejan Radonjić (4) | Crvena zvezda mts | |
| 2021–22 | (Montenegro) Dejan Radonjić (5) | Crvena zvezda mts | |

== Multiple winners ==
| Number | Coach | Winning team(s) | First | Last |
|---|---|---|---|---|
| 6 | (Montenegro) Duško Vujošević | Partizan | 2007 | 2014 |
| 5 | (Montenegro) Dejan Radonjić | Crvena zvezda | 2015 | 2022 |
| 2 | (Serbia) Vlada Jovanović | Partizan | 2011 | 2012 |

== See also ==
- List of ABA League-winning coaches
- List of Radivoj Korać Cup-winning head coaches
