= 2013–14 ABA League =

ABA League
- Season: 2013–14
- Duration: October 4, 2013 – March 31, 2014 (Regular season); April 24 – 27, 2014 (Final Four)
- Games played: 185
- Teams: 14
- TV partners: Arena Sport; Šport TV; Sport 1; MKTV; RTS; HRT; RTCG

Regular season
- Top seed: (Serbia) Crvena zvezda Telekom
- Season MVP: (Croatia) Dario Šarić (Cibona)
- Relegated: (Bosnia and Herzegovina) Široki

Finals
- Champions: (Croatia) Cibona; 1st title
- Runners-up: (Croatia) Cedevita
- Semi-finalists: (Serbia) Crvena zvezda Telekom (Serbia) Partizan
- Final Four MVP: (Croatia) Dario Šarić (Cibona)

Statistical leaders
Points	(Croatia) Dario Šarić (Cibona)	16.3
Rebounds	(Croatia) Dario Šarić (Cibona)	9.5
Assists	(United States) Jerel Blassingame (Cibona)	7.6

Records
- Highest attendance: 14,210

The 2013–14 ABA League was the 13th season of the ABA League, with 14 teams from Serbia, Slovenia, Montenegro, Croatia, Bosnia and Herzegovina, Macedonia and Hungary participating in it.

Regular season started on October 4, 2013, and lasted until March 31, 2014. The Final Four took place from April 24 to 27, 2014.

== Team information ==
Country	Teams	Team	City	Venue (Capacity)
Serbia	4			
Serbia	4	Crvena Zvezda Telekom	Belgrade	Pionir Hall (8,150)
Serbia	4	Mega Vizura	Smederevo	Sports Hall Smederevo (2,600)
Serbia	4	Partizan NIS	Belgrade	Pionir Hall (8,150)
Serbia	4	Radnički	Kragujevac	Hala Jezero (5,320)
Croatia	3			
Croatia	3	Cibona	Zagreb	Dražen Petrović Basketball Hall (5,400)
Croatia	3	Cedevita	Zagreb	Mala dvorana Doma sportova (4,000)
Croatia	3	Zadar	Zadar	Krešimir Ćosić Hall (10,000)
Bosnia and Herzegovina	2			
Bosnia and Herzegovina	2	Igokea	Aleksandrovac	Laktaši Sports Hall (3,000)
Bosnia and Herzegovina	2	Široki Primorka	Široki Brijeg	Pecara (4,500)
Slovenia	2			
Slovenia	2	Krka	Novo mesto	Leon Štukelj Hall (3,000)
Slovenia	2	Union Olimpija	Ljubljana	Arena Stožice (12,480)
Hungary	1	Szolnoki Olaj	Szolnok	Tiszaligeti Sportcsarnok (3,000)
(North Macedonia) Macedonia	1	MZT Skopje Aerodrom	Skopje	Boris Trajkovski Sports Center (8,000)
Montenegro	1	Budućnost VOLI	Podgorica	Morača Sports Center (5,000)

Location of teams in the ABA League 2013–14 (former Yugoslavia)
Location of teams in the 2013–14 ABA League (Hungary)

=== Head coaches ===
Team	Head coach
Budućnost VOLI	(Montenegro) Igor Jovović
Cedevita	(Croatia) Jasmin Repeša
Cibona	(Croatia) Slaven Rimac
Crvena zvezda Telekom	(Montenegro) Dejan Radonjić
Igokea	(Serbia) Vlada Jovanović
Krka	(Serbia) Aleksandar Džikić
Mega Vizura	(Serbia) Dejan Milojević
MZT Skopje Aerodrom	(Slovenia) Zoran Martič
Partizan NiS	(Serbia) Duško Vujošević
Radnički	(Serbia) Miroslav Nikolić
Szolnoki Olaj	(Serbia) Dragan Aleksić
Široki Primorka	(Bosnia and Herzegovina) Ivan Velić
Union Olimpija	(Slovenia) Aleš Pipan
Zadar	(Croatia) Rajko Vidaković

=== Coaching changes ===
Week	Club	Outgoing coach	Date of change	Incoming coach
7th	Cibona	(Croatia) Neven Spahija	14 November 2013	(Croatia) Slaven Rimac
7th	Igokea	(Bosnia and Herzegovina) Dragan Bajić	16 November 2013	(Bosnia and Herzegovina) Milutin Latinčić
8th	Široki Primorka	(Bosnia and Herzegovina) Damir Vujanović	18 November 2013	(Croatia) Jakša Vulić
10th	MZT Skopje	(Serbia) Vlada Vukoičić	1 December 2013	(Slovenia) Zoran Martič
11th	Szolnoki Olaj	(Austria) Nedeljko Ašćerić	11 December 2013	(Serbia) Dragan Aleksić
17th	Igokea	(Bosnia and Herzegovina) Milutin Latinčić	19 January 2014	(Serbia) Vlada Jovanović
18th	Zadar	(Croatia) Hrvoje Vlašić	28 January 2014	(Croatia) Ivan Sunara
21st	Široki Primorka	(Croatia) Jakša Vulić	24 February 2014	(Croatia) Ivan Velić
23rd	Zadar	(Croatia) Ivan Sunara	9 March 2014	(Croatia) Rajko Vidaković

== Regular season ==
The regular season began on October 4, 2013, and it will end on March 31, 2014.

=== Standings ===
	Team	Pld	W	L	PF	PA	Diff	Points	%
1	(Serbia) Crvena Zvezda Telekom	26	22	4	2017	1725	+292	48	.846
2	(Croatia) Cedevita	26	19	7	1917	1802	+115	45	.731
3	(Serbia) Partizan NIS	26	18	8	1837	1677	+160	44	.692
4	(Croatia) Cibona	26	17	9	2001	1919	+82	43	.654
5	(Montenegro) Budućnost VOLI	26	15	11	1921	1851	+70	41	.577
6	(Bosnia and Herzegovina) Igokea	26	13	13	1857	1935	–78	39	.500
7	(Slovenia) Krka	26	12	14	1815	1810	+5	38	.462
8	(Serbia) Mega Vizura	26	12	14	2111	2122	–11	38	.462
9	(North Macedonia) MZT Skopje Aerodrom	26	12	14	1964	1974	–10	38	.462
10	(Slovenia) Union Olimpija	26	11	15	1788	1804	–16	37	.423
11	(Serbia) Radnički	26	10	16	1977	2099	–122	36	.385
12	(Hungary) Szolnoki Olaj	26	8	18	1793	1937	–144	33	.308
13	(Croatia) Zadar	26	7	19	1776	1956	–180	33	.269
14	(Bosnia and Herzegovina) Široki Primorka	26	6	20	1789	1952	–163	32	.231

Qualified for Final four
Relegated

Pld – Played; W – Won; L – Lost; PF – Points for; PA – Points against; Diff – Difference; Pts – Points.

As of 31 March 2014

=== Schedule and results ===
	BUD	CDV	CIB	CZV	IGK	KRK	MEG	MZT	PAR	RKG	SZO	ŠRK	UOL	ZDR
(Montenegro) Budućnost VOLI		64–60	79–72	62–60	74–63	70–68	83–76	87–79	61–65	79–85	86–77	85–68	76–78	90–68
(Croatia) Cedevita	76–71		67–85	68–64	74–60	83–55	77–73	77–67	68–65	79–71	98–87	85–76	75–60	83–59
(Croatia) Cibona	65–55	66–51		67–76	74–82	92–78	98–96	93–90	80–76	66–82	87–63	91–80	83–71	91–74
(Serbia) Crvena Zvezda	74–64	73–59	88–63		93–59	78–65	86–78	87–77	63–57	88–51	90–64	73–66	87–62	82–69
(Bosnia and Herzegovina) Igokea	75–68	96–89	55–67	52–72		83–74	83–80	65–79	80–83	91–88	72–58	69–60	74–61	65–58
(Slovenia) Krka	60–57	64–65	66–77	69–78	69–66		80–65	73–50	60–52	83–57	73–67	94–67	67–63	79–80
(Serbia) Mega Vizura	92–86	62–72	102–74	86–98	77–91	78–74		101–82	76–81	90–87	95–89	82–73	80–85	91–75
(North Macedonia) MZT Skopje Aerodrom	78–71	75–81	88–93	65–58	90–85	80–75	80–72		69–70	87–95	82–71	88–75	79–60	78–69
(Serbia) Partizan NIS	72–65	77–68	80–71	83–86	67–56	80–67	88–65	66–73		82–70	20–0	63–58	63–53	80–65
(Serbia) Radnički	72–86	61–78	78–71	73–78	82–67	84–77	84–86	69–79	66–92		82–91	75–55	81–66	79–74
(Hungary) Szolnoki Olaj	75–84	68–67	63–64	72–77	79–72	55–63	61–66	81–69	76–71	101–92		71–69	62–71	80–75
(Bosnia and Herzegovina) Široki Primorka	67–81	68–73	73–84	80–79	78–50	63–68	72–86	67–63	60–81	79–81	76–66		60–58	72–58
(Slovenia) Union Olimpija	69–73	69–71	47–74	61–62	62–66	65–57	88–75	73–62	66–59	85–56	74–57	77–62		90–66
(Croatia) Zadar	57–64	66–73	59–53	53–67	79–80	55–57	75–81	72–70	56–64	89–76	71–67	77–69	77–75	

== Final four ==
Matches played on 24–27 April 2014 in Kombank Arena, Belgrade, Serbia.

Semifinals
1	(Serbia) Crvena zvezda	70
4	(Croatia) Cibona	75
2	(Croatia) Cedevita	81
3	(Serbia) Partizan	79

Final
(Croatia) Cibona	72
(Croatia) Cedevita	59

=== Semifinals ===
24 April 2014
20:00

Report

Crvena zvezda Telekom (Serbia)	70–75	(Croatia) Cibona
Pts: Blažič 25; Rebs: Marjanović 7 Asts: Jenkins 8		Pts: Blassingame 28; Rebs: Šarić 15; Asts: Blassingame 9

Kombank Arena, Belgrade
Attendance: 8.212
Referees: Boltauzer Matej, Javor Damir, Obradović Petar

25 April 2014
20:00

Report

Cedevita (Croatia)	81–79	(Serbia) Partizan NIS
Pts: Bilan 14; Rebs: Suton 11; Asts: Babić 8		Pts: Pavlović 25; Rebs: Bogdanović 7 Asts: Tepić 4

Kombank Arena, Belgrade
Attendance: 14 210
Referees: Pukl Saša, Boltauzer Matej, Petek Sašo

=== Final ===
27 April 2014
20:00

Report

Cibona (Croatia)	72–59	(Croatia) Cedevita
Pts: Šarić 23; Rebs: Rozić, Šarić 11; Asts: Blassingame 9		Pts: Zubčić 13; Rebs: Nurkić 7 Asts: Delaš 4

Kombank Arena, Belgrade
Attendance: 2142
Referees: Belošević Ilija, Jovčić Milivoje, Vojinović Milija

2013–14 ABA League Champions
(Croatia)
Cibona
1st title

== Top 10 attendances ==
=== Single game ===
	Round	Game	Home team	Visitor	Attendance	Sources
1	Semifinal		(Croatia) Cedevita	(Serbia) Partizan NIS	14,210	
2	Semifinal		(Serbia) Crvena zvezda Telekom	(Croatia) Cibona	8,212	
3	Regular Season	1	(Serbia) Partizan NIS	(Bosnia and Herzegovina) Igokea	6,500	
4	Regular Season	8	(Serbia) Partizan NIS	(Serbia) Crvena zvezda Telekom	6,500	
5	Regular Season	5	(North Macedonia) MZT Skopje Aerodrom	(Serbia) Partizan NIS	6,200	
6	Regular Season	6	(Serbia) Partizan NIS	(Croatia) Cibona	6,000	
7	Regular Season	2	(Serbia) Partizan NIS	(Serbia) Mega Vizura	5,600	
8	Regular Season	4	(Serbia) Partizan NIS	(Croatia) Zadar	5,500	
9	Regular Season	12	(Serbia) Partizan NIS	(Montenegro) Budućnost VOLI	5,500	
10	Regular Season	12	(North Macedonia) MZT Skopje Aerodrom	(Serbia) Crvena zvezda Telekom	5,300	

=== Average ===
Pos	Team	GP	Average	High	Low
1	(Serbia) Partizan NIS	12	5,775	6,700	4,500
2	(North Macedonia) MZT Skopje Aerodrom	13	3,204	6,200	1,800
3	(Bosnia and Herzegovina) Široki Primorka	13	2,923	4,000	1,500
4	(Serbia) Crvena Zvezda	13	2,855	4,500	1,129
5	(Croatia) Zadar	13	2,808	5,000	2,000
6	(Montenegro) Budućnost VOLI	13	2,496	5,100	1,500
7	(Serbia) Radnički	13	2,446	4,000	1,500
8	(Croatia) Cibona	13	2,150	5,200	750
9	(Slovenia) Union Olimpija	13	2,031	3,800	500
10	(Hungary) Szolnoki Olaj	13	1,570	1,900	1,000
11	(Croatia) Cedevita	13	1,498	3,200	627
12	(Bosnia and Herzegovina) Igokea	13	1,392	3,100	500
13	(Slovenia) Krka	13	1,342	2,000	1,000
14	(Serbia) Mega Leks	13	1,273	2,600	500

- Updated to games played on 31 March 2014

Source: ABA League

== Stats leaders ==
As of 31 March 2014

=== MVP Round by Round ===
Round	Player	Team	Efficiency
1	(United States) Malcolm Armstead	(Slovenia) Krka	30
2	(France) Léo Westermann	(Serbia) Partizan NIS	31
3	(North Macedonia) Todor Gečevski	(North Macedonia) MZT Skopje Aerodrom	39
4	(Croatia) Siniša Štemberger	(Bosnia and Herzegovina) Igokea	35
5	(United States) Tarence Kinsey	(Serbia) Partizan NIS	32
6	(United States) Willie Warren	(Hungary) Szolnoki Olaj	50
7	(Bosnia and Herzegovina) Ratko Varda	(Serbia) Mega Vizura	40
8	(Serbia) Boban Marjanović	(Serbia) Crvena zvezda Telekom	34
9	(Croatia) Miro Bilan	(Croatia) Cedevita	28
9	(Serbia) Bogdan Bogdanović	(Serbia) Partizan NIS	28
9	(United States) Willie Warren (2)	(Hungary) Szolnoki Olaj	28
10	(United States) Jerel Blassingame	(Croatia) Cibona	33
11	(Serbia) Sava Lešić	(Serbia) Radnički	41
12	(Slovenia) Edo Murić	(Slovenia) Krka	32
13	(Serbia) Sava Lešić (2)	(Serbia) Radnički	28
14	(Croatia) Marko Jagodić-Kuridža	(Croatia) Cibona	32
15	(United States) Jerel Blassingame (2)	(Croatia) Cibona	32
15	(Croatia) Dario Šarić	(Croatia) Cibona	32
16	(Lithuania) Deividas Gailius	(Slovenia) Union Olimpija	29
16	(Serbia) Sava Lešić (3)	(Serbia) Radnički	29
16	(Croatia) Dario Šarić (2)	(Croatia) Cibona	29
17	(United States) Charles Jenkins	(Serbia) Crvena zvezda Telekom	30
18	(Croatia) Ivan Buva	(Bosnia and Herzegovina) Široki Primorka	31
19	(Serbia) Bogdan Bogdanović (2)	(Serbia) Partizan NIS	35
20	(Serbia) Marko Marinović	(Serbia) Radnički	35
21	(Croatia) Marin Rozić	(Croatia) Cibona	40
22	(Montenegro) Nikola Ivanović	(Montenegro) Budućnost VOLI	36
23	(Serbia) Aleksandar Cvetković	(North Macedonia) MZT Skopje Aerodrom	33
24	(United States) Johnathon Jones	(Bosnia and Herzegovina) Široki Primorka	31
24	(Serbia) Branko Jorović	(Bosnia and Herzegovina) Igokea	31
25	(Croatia) Dario Šarić (3)	(Croatia) Cibona	30
26	(Serbia) Nenad Miljenović	(Serbia) Mega Vizura	31
SF	(Croatia) Dario Šarić (4)	(Croatia) Cibona	29
F	(Croatia) Dario Šarić (5)	(Croatia) Cibona	33

Source: ABA League

=== Ranking MVP ===
Rank	Name	Team	Efficiency	Games	Average
1.	(Croatia) Dario Šarić	(Croatia) Cibona	550	26	21.15
2.	(United States) Willie Warren	(Hungary) Szolnoki Olaj	307	17	18.06
3.	(Serbia) Sava Lešić	(Serbia) Radnički	453	26	17.42
4.	(Serbia) Nenad Miljenović	(Serbia) Mega Vizura	427	25	17.08
5.	(Serbia) Boban Marjanović	(Serbia) Crvena zvezda	428	26	16.46

=== Points ===
Rank	Name	Team	Points	Games	PPG
1.	(Croatia) Dario Šarić	(Croatia) Cibona	423	26	16.27
2.	(Serbia) Sava Lešić	(Serbia) Radnički	411	26	15.81
3.	(Bosnia and Herzegovina) Nemanja Gordić	(Bosnia and Herzegovina) Igokea	374	24	15.58
4.	(United States) Willie Warren	(Hungary) Szolnoki Olaj	264	17	15.53
5.	(Serbia) Bogdan Bogdanović	(Serbia) Partizan	359	24	14.96

=== Rebounds ===
Rank	Name	Team	Rebounds	Games	RPG
1.	(Croatia) Dario Šarić	(Croatia) Cibona	246	26	9.46
2.	(France) Joffrey Lauvergne	(Serbia) Partizan	184	25	7.36
3.	(Serbia) Boban Marjanović	(Serbia) Crvena zvezda	190	26	7.31
4.	(Serbia) Sava Lešić	(Serbia) Radnički	173	26	6.65
5.	(Serbia) Nemanja Radović	(Serbia) Mega Vizura	126	19	6.63

=== Assists ===
Rank	Name	Team	Assists	Games	APG
1.	(United States) Jerel Blassingame	(Croatia) Cibona	198	26	7.62
2.	(Serbia) Marko Marinović	(Serbia) Radnički	190	26	7.31
3.	(Serbia) Vasilije Micić	(Serbia) Mega Vizura	146	25	5.84
4.	(United States) Willie Warren	(Hungary) Szolnoki Olaj	90	17	5.29
5.	(Serbia) Nenad Miljenović	(Serbia) Mega Vizura	130	25	5.20

== The ideal five and coach of the season ==
The ideal five of the season selected by the fans and head coaches of the ABA League teams.

Position	Name	Team
PG	(United States) DeMarcus Nelson	(Serbia) Crvena zvezda
SG	(Serbia) Bogdan Bogdanović	(Serbia) Partizan
SF	(Croatia) Dario Šarić	(Croatia) Cibona
PF	(France) Joffrey Lauvergne	(Serbia) Partizan
C	(Serbia) Boban Marjanović	(Serbia) Crvena zvezda
Coach	(Montenegro) Dejan Radonjić	(Serbia) Crvena zvezda
