= List of Radivoj Korać Cup–winning head coaches =

Korać Cup-winning head coaches
- Sport: Basketball
- Competition: Radivoj Korać Cup
- Location: Niš (2003, 2008–2010, 2012, 2015–2020, 2022–2023); Novi Sad (2004, 2021); Vršac (2005); Belgrade (2006, 2011, 2014); Kragujevac (2007, 2013)
- Country: Serbia and Montenegro (2003–2006); Serbia (2006–present)

The list of Radivoj Korać Cup-winning head coaches shows all head coaches who won the Radivoj Korać Cup, the top-tier national men's professional basketball cup in Serbia.

== Winners ==
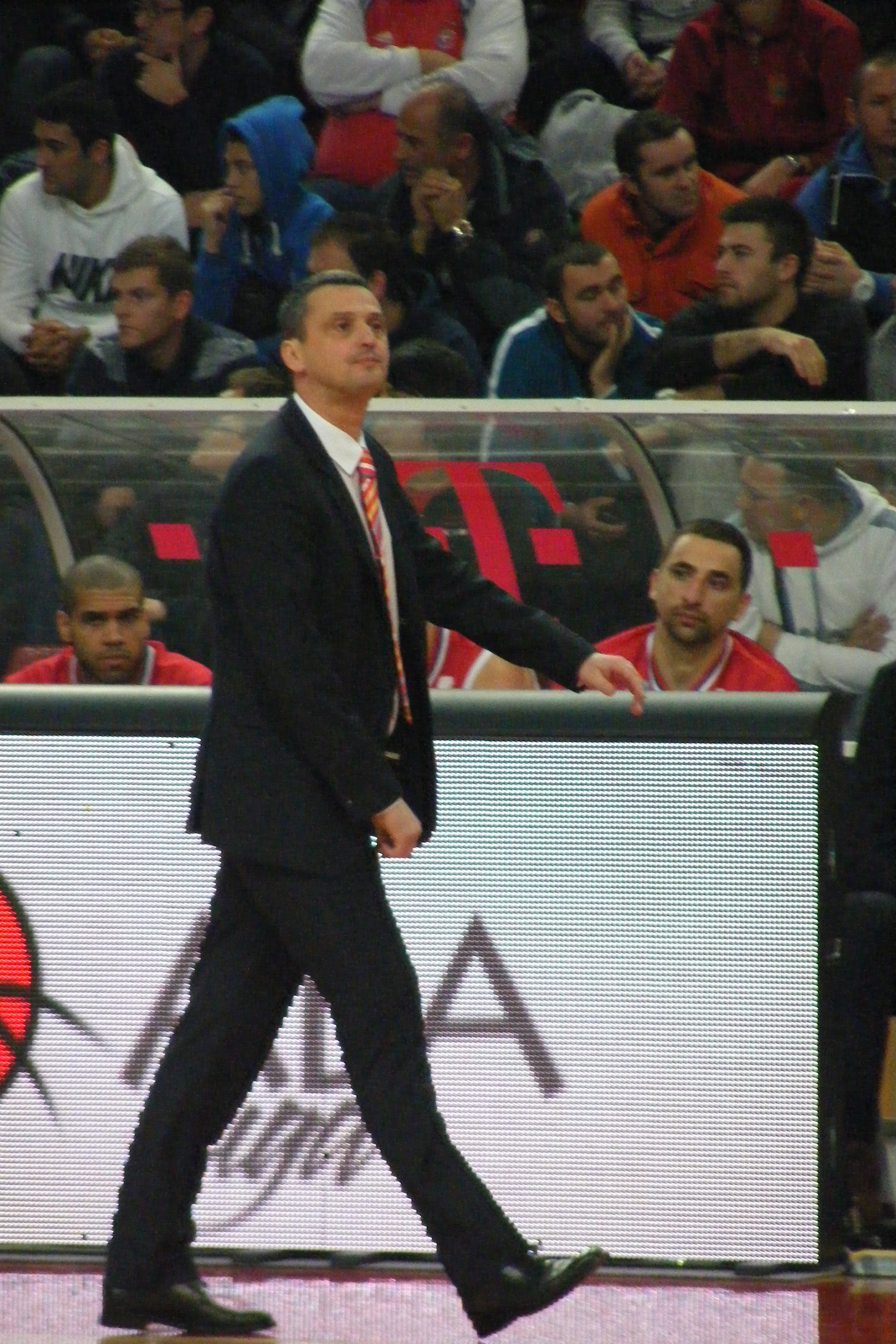
Dejan Radonjić won the cup record five times.

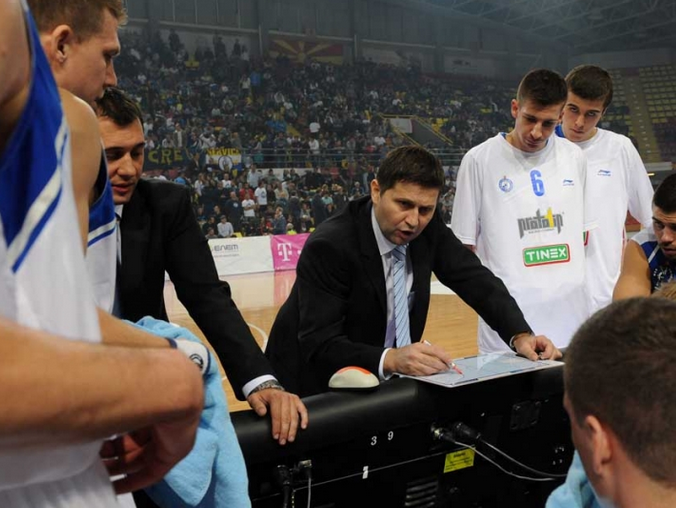
Vlada Vukoičić won two cups with two different clubs.

Season	Head coach	Team	Ref.
2002–03	(Serbia and Montenegro) Vlade Đurović	FMP Železnik	
2003–04	(Slovenia) Zmago Sagadin	Crvena zvezda	
2004–05	(Serbia and Montenegro) Boško Đokić	Reflex	
2005–06	(Serbia and Montenegro) Dragan Šakota	Crvena zvezda	
2006–07	(Serbia) Vlada Vukoičić	FMP Železnik	
2007–08	(Serbia) Duško Vujošević	Partizan	
2008–09	(Serbia) Duško Vujošević	Partizan	
2009–10	(Serbia) Duško Vujošević	Partizan	
2010–11	(Serbia) Vlada Jovanović	Partizan	
2011–12	(Serbia) Vlada Jovanović	Partizan	
2012–13	(Serbia) Vlada Vukoičić	Crvena zvezda Beograd	
2013–14	(Montenegro) Dejan Radonjić	Crvena zvezda Telekom	
2014–15	(Montenegro) Dejan Radonjić	Crvena zvezda Telekom	
2015–16	(Serbia) Dejan Milojević	Mega Leks	
2016–17	(Montenegro) Dejan Radonjić	Crvena zvezda mts	
2017–18	(Serbia) Nenad Čanak	Partizan NIS	
2018–19	(Italy) Andrea Trinchieri	Partizan NIS	
2019–20	(Italy) Andrea Trinchieri	Partizan NIS	
2020–21	(Montenegro) Dejan Radonjić	Crvena zvezda mts	
2021–22	(Montenegro) Dejan Radonjić	Crvena zvezda mts	
2022–23	(Montenegro) Duško Ivanović	Crvena zvezda Meridianbet	
2023–24	(Greece) Ioannis Sfairopoulos	Crvena zvezda Meridianbet	

== Multiple winners ==
Number	Coach	Winning team(s)	First	Last
5	(Montenegro) Dejan Radonjić	Crvena zvezda	2014	2022
3	(Montenegro) Duško Vujošević	Partizan	2008	2010
2	(Serbia) Vlada Jovanović	Partizan	2011	2012
2	(Serbia) Vlada Vukoičić	FMP Železnik, Crvena zvezda	2007	2013
2	(Italy) Andrea Trinchieri	Partizan	2019	2020

== See also ==
- List of BLS-winning head coaches
- Radivoj Korać Cup MVP Award
