= Dejan Milojević =

Serbian basketball player and coach (1977–2024)

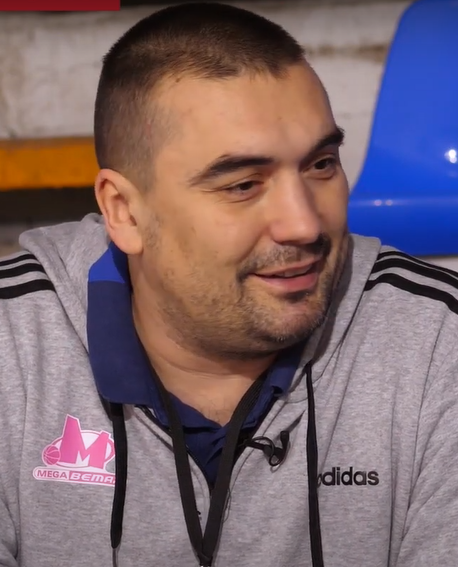
- Milojević as head coach of Mega in 2020

Personal information
- Born: 15 April 1977 Belgrade, SR Serbia, Yugoslavia
- Died: 17 January 2024 (aged 46) Salt Lake County, Utah, U.S.
- Listed height: 6 ft 7 in (2.01 m)
- Listed weight: 254 lb (115 kg)

Career information
- NBA draft: 1999: undrafted
- Playing career: 1994–2009
- Position: Power forward
- Number: 13, 31
- Coaching career: 2012–2024

Career history

Playing
- 1994–1998: Beovuk
- 1998–2000: FMP
- 2000–2004: Budućnost
- 2004–2006: Partizan
- 2006–2008: Pamesa Valencia
- 2008–2009: Galatasaray
- 2009: Partizan

Coaching
- 2012–2020: Mega Basket
- 2021: Budućnost
- 2021–2024: Golden State Warriors (assistant)

Career highlights
- As player: 3× ABA League MVP (2004–2006); 2× ABA League Top Scorer (2005, 2006); 2× ABA League rebounding leader (2004, 2005); 3× YUBA League champion (2001, 2005, 2006); YUBA League MVP (2004); YUBA League Finals MVP (2005); 2× YUBA League rebounding leader (2000, 2003); FR Yugoslavia Cup winner (2001); 3× YUBA All-Star (1999–2001); As head coach: Montenegrin League champion (2021); Serbian Cup winner (2016); Montenegrin Cup winner (2021); As assistant coach: NBA champion (2022)
Medals
Men's basketball
Representing Serbia and Montenegro
EuroBasket
Gold medal – first place	2001 Turkey
'22 & Under' European Championship
Gold medal – first place	1998 Italy

Dejan Milojević (Serbian Cyrillic: Дејан Милојевић; 15 April 1977 – 17 January 2024) was a Serbian professional basketball player and coach. At the time of his death, he was an assistant coach for the Golden State Warriors of the National Basketball Association (NBA).

Standing at 6 ft 7 in (2.01 m), Milojević played professionally as a power forward from 1994 until 2009, appearing for the FR Yugoslavia / Serbia and Montenegro league teams Beovuk, FMP, Budućnost and Partizan, as well as for Pamesa Valencia in Spain, and Galatasaray in Turkey. He was named the Adriatic League Most Valuable Player three times in a row. Milojević played on the FR Yugoslavia national team, winning EuroBasket gold in 2001.

Three years after his 2009 retirement from playing professional basketball, Milojević became a head coach for Mega Basket of the Adriatic Basketball Association (ABA). There, he coached future NBA All-Star and NBA MVP Nikola Jokić. In the 2015–16 season, he coached Mega to their first-ever trophy, the Serbian Cup, as well as their first ABA League finals appearance. In 2021, he won Montenegrin League and Montenegrin Cup titles with Budućnost.

In addition to club coaching, Milojević had a coaching stint with the Serbian national team from December 2019 until September 2021, assisting head coach Igor Kokoškov.

== Early years ==
Born in Belgrade, Milojević was raised in the suburb of Padinska Skela.

Milojević began pursuing organized basketball at age 13, signing up for the KK Tašmajdan youth categories in 1990 through a friend who had already been playing there. Starting out in KK Tašmajdan's youth system, teenage Milojević quickly began dominating over his age group, scoring 141 points in a 202–52 cadet (under-16) win versus OKK Beograd under-16 team in 1991, a still-standing record.

== Professional career ==
His professional career began with Beovuk in 1994. He played there until 1998.

=== FMP Železnik (1998–2000) ===
After winning gold with the FR Yugoslavia under-22 national team at the 1998 '22 and Under' European Championship, 21-year-old Milojević joined the YUBA League club FMP from the Belgrade suburb of Železnik. The club had won the Yugoslav Cup in recent past (1997); however, instead of adding to the cup-winning squad in search of more trophies, FMP—led by owner Nebojša Čović and sporting director Ratko Radovanović—decided to immediately start selling it off and turn to producing and nurturing young talent in an academy-like setup. The team still managed to make YUBA League playoff finals in the 1997–98 season; however, the wholesale clearance of the squad (most of them over the age of 23) continued, with Nikola Jestratijević, Goran Bošković and Dejan Radonjić leaving. The squad that Milojević arrived to in summer 1998 thus, almost exclusively, featured fellow young players (either brought up through the FMP youth system or acquired from smaller teams throughout the FR Yugoslav constituent units of Serbia and Montenegro), such as 22-year-old power forward-center Goran Nikolić, 23-year-old center Dragan Basarić, defensively minded 21-year-old swingman Veselin Petrović, 22-year-old shooting guard Aleksandar Smiljanić, 22-year-old power forward Aleksandar Matić, and supremely talented 17-year-old small forward Mladen Šekularac. Also joining FMP from Beovuk, alongside Milojević, was 19-year-old fellow power forward-center Ognjen Aškrabić.

==== 1998–99 season: reaching Yugoslav Cup final ====
Beginning the 1998–99 season under head coach Boško Đokić, the young FMP team would be taken over by coach Aco Petrović over the course of the season. Playing the small forward position (due to being adjudged to be too small for a power forward), Milojević started the season as the team's fourth or fifth option on offense, playing up to 10–15 minutes per game, with his poor outside shooting preventing him from having a bigger role on the team. FMP managed to pull an upset in the very first game of the league season, beating the reigning champions Crvena zvezda 73–72 behind Vesa Petrović's 21 points as well as his suffocating defence. FMP managed another notable upset in week 6, destroying the favored Partizan 102–84 with Petrović again leading the pack with 25 points. Small forward role player Milojević would soon be given a chance at power forward by coach Petrović at a few warm-up games due the team's entire front line of Nikolić, Aškrabić and Basarić getting injured. Seeing that the power forward spot suited the player much better, coach Petrović continued playing Milojević at the four position despite being considered undersized for it. Playing high energy basketball, the young team managed some notable scalps that season—including beating both Partizan and Crvena zvezda—en route to an 11–11 mid-table league finish, well out of the spots for playoff that did not even end up being played due to the NATO bombing of FR Yugoslavia starting on 24 March 1999.

FMP qualified for the 1999 Yugoslav Cup final tournament, played in extraordinary circumstances under air-raid sirens and threat of aerial bombardment on 20–21 April 1999 at Belgrade's Pionir Hall. After defeating KK Radnički Belgrade in the semis, FMP lost heavily, 80–62, to the Vladislav Lučić-coached Partizan team featuring Dejan Tomašević, Haris Brkić, Miroslav Radošević and Dragan Lukovski, with Milojević scoring the game-high 22 points in front of a packed arena with 7,000 spectators who at one point held up 'Target' signs protesting the NATO assault on Yugoslavia.

While playing a couple of seasons for the club Milojević became famous for his blue-collar and never-quit style of playing. He averaged a double-double in both of his seasons with FMP and won the league MVP award in 1999.

In 2000, Milojević moved to the Podgorica-based Budućnost, where he won his first National Championship in 2001. He spent three more seasons there, improving his skills and his game every year. Already a dominating inside presence, he improved his three-point and free-throw shooting, an area in which he struggled a lot in the early years. While in Budućnost he won a couple more league MVP awards, in 2003 and 2004.

=== Budućnost (2000–2004) ===
Milojević joined the FR Yugoslav champions Budućnost during summer 2000 in a big-money acquisition that saw the Podgorica club reportedly pay FMP a transfer fee in excess of DM1 million (~€600,000). Furthermore, during the same transfer window, the club also acquired shooting guard Igor Rakočević and combo guard Saša Obradović from KK Crvena zvezda, both of whom had just finished competing for FR Yugoslavia at the 2000 Olympics, thus indicating the highest level of expectations for the upcoming 2000–01 season.

==== 2000–01 season: Yugoslav league-cup double and Euroleague debut ====
Playing on a squad coached by Miroslav Nikolić that in addition to high-profile newcomers Rakočević and Obradović also featured established holdovers Dejan Tomašević, Milenko Topić, Vladimir Kuzmanović, Dejan Radonjić and Haris Brkić, new piece Milojević—mostly deployed as Topić's backup at the power forward spot—contributed to Budućnost's domination over the YUBA League competition with a 21–1 regular season record.

The season also saw Milojević make his Euroleague debut in the ULEB version of the competition (without the FIBA-loyal clubs) due to a split between FIBA Europe and ULEB that season. Drawn in a round robin group with FC Barcelona, P.A.O.K. and Scaligera Verona along with minnows London Towers and Frankfurt Skyliners, Budućnost started the competition with a 6–2 record through their first 8 games, losing only to the FC Barcelona team (featuring Pau Gasol, Šarūnas Jasikevičius and Juan Carlos Navarro) twice.

By late December 2000, head coach Nikolić was released and in early 2001 replaced by the high-profile decorated coach Bogdan Tanjević who thus returned to Yugoslav club basketball after more than twenty years since leaving the head coaching post at Bosna in 1980. The club also added some size under the basket by acquiring center Jerome James with NBA experience from the Sacramento Kings.

By the end of the Euroelague group stage, Budućnost managed a 7–3 record that was good for the third spot in the group and a Round-of-16 matchup versus powerhouse Real Madrid. They had a chance to possibly avoid Real and have a home-court advantage in the round-of-16 series had they beaten PAOK away in Thessaloniki; however, that group game ended with an 89-72 PAOK win. Led by Saša Đorđević, Alberto Herreros, Erik Meek, Éric Struelens and Marko Milič, Real easily swept Budućnost 2-games-to-0 in their best-of-three series. With Topić out injured for both games, Milojević had 3 points and 8 rebounds in 17 minutes of action in the first game, a 91–63 blowout in Madrid, while adding 4 points in 14 minutes in the second game in Podgorica. Over 11 Euroleague games he appeared in throughout the season, Milojević averaged 4.6 points per game and 3.2 rebonds per game in 13.5 minutes per game.

Budućnost won the Yugoslav Cup at the final tournament in Vršac, with Milojević contributing 9 points in the final versus Partizan.

=== Partizan (2004–2006) ===
After averaging 20.5 points and 10.8 rebounds per game in the 2003–04 season, his third MVP season, Milojević signed with the three-time defending champion Partizan. Despite having significantly better financial offers from Dynamo Moscow and Crvena zvezda, the sought-after power forward ending up signing for Partizan out of desire to play for coach Duško Vujošević. Although Partizan underachieved in the competition, Milojević was his usual dominant self, averaging 20.8 points, 11.5 rebounds, and just over 3 steals and assists per game. He was also the key player for Partizan's other title rout in the domestic league, as they lost only one game during the playoffs. In the 2005–06 season, Milojević had another double-double EuroLeague season, scoring 16.4 points and grabbing 10 rebounds per game, also winning a couple of Player of the Week honors.

=== Later career ===
From Partizan, Milojević moved to the Spanish side Pamesa Valencia, where he played two seasons, finishing his international career with the Turkish club Galatasaray Café Crown in the 2008–09 season. He moved back to Partizan in July 2009. He announced his retirement on 1 September 2009 due to a recurring knee injury.

== National team career ==
=== Youth ===
Milojević was a member of the Yugoslavia junior national team (representing FR Yugoslavia), together with Igor Rakočević and Marko Jarić, that won the gold medal at the 1998 European Championship for Men '22 and Under' in Trapani, Italy. Over six tournament games, he averaged 3.3 points and 3.5 rebounds per game.

=== Full squad ===
First time Milojević received a training camp invite for the Yugoslavia national team was by head coach Željko Obradović ahead of EuroBasket 1999. The 22-year-old FMP power forward ended up getting cut by Obradović, thus not making the final 12-man squad taken to the championship.

The following summer, right as he was transferring to KK Budućnost, Milojević was called up again by Obradović for the 2000 Olympics training camp. Once again, the player would eventually be cut by Obradović.

With a good season at Budućnost under his belt, Milojević made the Yugoslavia senior national team, selected and coached by Svetislav Pešić, that triumphed dominantly at the EuroBasket 2001 in Turkey. Over the three games where he saw action—group-stage contests versus Germany and Estonia as well as quarterfinal versus Latvia—he averaged 4.7 points and 3.3 rebounds per game.

Pešić called Milojević up again in summer 2002 for the training camp ahead of the 2002 FIBA World Championship; however, an injury eliminated him this time.

Later, he was a member of the Serbia and Montenegro national team that finished 9th at EuroBasket 2005 in his home country. Over three tournament games, he averaged 5.3 points and 2.7 rebounds per game.

In March 2007, six months ahead of EuroBasket 2007, soon-to-be-30-year-old Milojević ruled himself out of national team consideration, citing chronic knee inflammation.

== Coaching career ==
=== Mega (2012–2020) ===
In October 2012, three years after retiring from playing professional basketball, Milojević became the head coach of Serbian team Mega Vizura. In his first season with the team he had great success, leading his team to the Basketball League of Serbia playoff semifinals, thus clinching a spot in the regional Adriatic League for the next season.

In the team's ABA League debut season, he led the team to 8th place with a 12–14 record.

On 1 June 2020, he ended his tenure with Mega Basket. Over 345 games during eight seasons, he had a 173–172 record. During his time with Mega witnessed eleven of his Mega players selected in the NBA draft (Nikola Jokić, Vasilije Micić, Nemanja Dangubić, Timothé Luwawu-Cabarrot, Ivica Zubac, Rade Zagorac, Vlatko Čančar, Ognjen Jaramaz, Alpha Kaba, Goga Bitadze and Marko Simonović).

Milojević got his first taste of the NBA through Summer League coaching stint in the 2018 season with the Houston Rockets.

=== Budućnost (2021) ===
On 28 January 2021, Montenegrin club Budućnost hired Milojević as their new head coach, signing him to a two-and-a-half-year contract. The appointment came one day after the previous head coach Petar Mijović's resignation midway through the 2020–21 season.

On 3 June 2021, Milojević won the Montenegrin Cup tournament following a 102–93 win over Mornar.

Later that month, he won the Montenegrin League Championship after his team had a 3–0 win over Mornar in the 2021 Finals. He left Budućnost in June 2021 to join the Golden State Warriors, thus exercising the NBA opt-out clause in his contract with the Montenegrin club.

=== Golden State Warriors assistant (2021–2024) ===
On 13 August 2021, the Golden State Warriors announced the hiring of Milojević as an assistant coach, reportedly signing him to a "multiyear deal".

Joining the head coach Steve Kerr's staff, alongside two more incoming assistant coaches Jama Mahlalela and Kenny Atkinson, Milojević was tasked with working with squad members playing closer to the basket that the team deploys in stretch four, power forward, forward-center and center positions. For Milojević, that meant primarily focusing on Golden State's recently drafted young center James Wiseman as well as their established squad players Draymond Green and Kevon Looney. Due to Wiseman's multiple injuries throughout the 2021–22 season, Milojević ended up spending more time working with Looney and was credited for helping the seventh-year player improve his rebounding in the regular season and 2022 playoffs. The Warriors went on to defeat the Boston Celtics in the 2022 NBA Finals in six games, giving Milojević his first and only NBA championship, making him the second Serbian assistant coach (after Igor Kokoškov) to win an NBA ring.

== National team coaching ==
On 5 December 2019, Milojević was named an assistant coach for the Serbia national team under Igor Kokoškov. In September 2021, he left the national team as the assistant coach.

== Career statistics ==
Legend
GP	Games played	GS	Games started	MPG	Minutes per game
FG%	Field-goal percentage	3P%	3-point field-goal percentage	FT%	Free-throw percentage
RPG	Rebounds per game	APG	Assists per game	SPG	Steals per game
BPG	Blocks per game	PPG	Points per game	PIR	Performance index rating
**Bold**	Career high

=== EuroLeague ===
Year	Team	GP	GS	MPG	FG%	3P%	FT%	RPG	APG	SPG	BPG	PPG	PIR
2000–01	Budućnost	11	2	13.5	.622	.000	.333	3.2	.2	.6	.0	4.6	3.0
2001–02	Budućnost	8	6	23.4	.545	**.412**	.375	6.4	.4	1.6	**.3**	9.5	9.5
2002–03	Budućnost	**14**	**13**	31.7	.592	.000	.695	6.5	2.4	1.8	.2	11.6	15.1
2004–05	Partizan	6	6	**35.5**	**.634**	.000	.700	**11.5**	**3.3**	**3.5**	**.3**	**20.8**	**30.5**
2005–06	Partizan	12	12	34.6	.419	.294	**.730**	10.1	2.3	1.9	.1	16.4	23.6
Career		51	39	27.6	.539	.214	.662	7.2	1.7	1.7	.2	12.0	15.4

== Death ==
On 16 January 2024, Milojević was hospitalized after suffering a heart attack at a Salt Lake City restaurant while dining with fellow Warriors coaches and players. The hospitalization resulted in the postponement of the Warriors games against the Utah Jazz and Dallas Mavericks, which had been scheduled for the following days. He died the following day, on 17 January, at the age of 46 and was buried in his native Belgrade on 12 February in a ceremony in which many of the Warriors' staff attended.

On 15 February 2024, Milojević was posthumously awarded the Order of Karađorđe's Star (1st class).

== See also ==
- List of Radivoj Korać Cup-winning head coaches
- List of Serbian NBA coaches
- List of foreign NBA coaches
