= Željko Lukajić =

Serbian basketball coach (born 1958)

Spartak Pleven
- Position: Head coach

Personal information
- Born: December 14, 1958 (age 67) Goražde, PR Bosnia-Herzegovina, FPR Yugoslavia
- Coaching career: 1986–present

Career history

Coaching
- 1986–1987: Famos Hrasnica
- 1988–1989: Igman Ilidža
- 1991–1992: Željezničar
- 1992–1993: OKK Kikinda
- 1993–1994: Partizan
- 1994–1995: Borovica
- 1995–1996: PAOK
- 1997–1998: Vojvodina
- 1998–2005: Hemofarm
- 2007: Igokea
- 2007–2008: Lukoil Academic
- 2008–2009: Universitet Yugra Surgut
- 2010–2012: Hemofarm
- 2012–2013: Politekhnika-Halychyna
- 2014–2015: Igokea
- 2017–2018: MZT Skopje
- 2023: Spartak Subotica
- 2023–2024: Joker

Career highlights
- As head coach: Adriatic League champion (2005); Yugoslav Cup winner (1994); Bulgarian League champion (2008); Bulgarian Cup winner (2008); Bosnian Cup winner (2007); Macedonian Cup winner (2018)

Željko "Struja" Lukajić (Serbian Cyrillic: Жељко Лукајић; born December 14, 1958) is a Serbian professional basketball coach.

== Coaching career ==
Lukajić began coaching in 1986 when he was the head coach of KK Famos Hrasnica for the 1986–1987 season. Over two decades he worked with Bosnian and Serbian clubs, including Partizan in 1993–94 season and Hemofarm from 1998 until 2005.

In January 2010, he became the head coach of his former team Hemofarm. He parted ways with the team in January 2012.

Month later, he took the coaching position in the Ukrainian team Politekhnika-Halychyna. He stayed there for one and a half season.

On November 26, 2014, he returned to Igokea to be the team's new head coach; he already had short stint coaching Igokea in 2007.

On December 8, 2017, he became a head coach of Macedonian basketball team MZT Skopje. He left MZT on April 3, 2018.

== See also ==
- List of ABA League-winning coaches
