= Vlada Vukoičić =

Serbian basketball coach

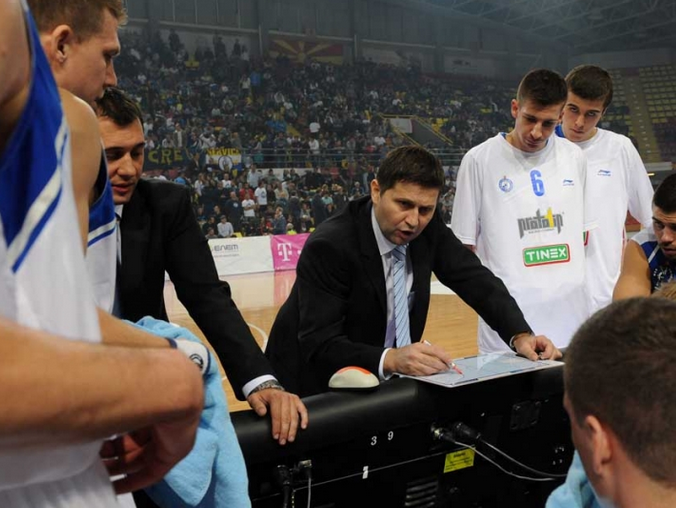
- Vukoičić coaching MZT Skopje in October 2013.

Qingdao Eagles
- Position: Head coach
- League: Chinese Basketball Association

Personal information
- Born: 2 June 1973 (age 53) Belgrade, SR Serbia, SFR Yugoslavia

Career information
- Coaching career: 1994–present

Career history

Coaching
- 1994–2003: FMP (youth)
- 2003–2005: Reflex (assistant)
- 2005–2008: FMP
- 2008: Hemofarm
- 2008: Oostende
- 2008–2009: Bosna
- 2010–2012: Mega Vizura
- 2012–2013: Crvena zvezda
- 2013: MZT Skopje
- 2015: Tadamon Zouk
- 2015–2016: Balkan Botevgrad
- 2016–2018: Mega Bemax (youth)
- 2019–2020; 2021–present: Qingdao Eagles

Career highlights
- Adriatic League champion (2006); Junior Adriatic League champion (2018); 2× Serbian Cup winner (2007, 2013)
Medals
Men's basketball
Head coach for Serbia
U20 European Championship
Gold medal – first place	2007 Italy / Slovenia	Team

Vlada Vukoičić (Serbian: Влада Вукоичић; born 2 June 1973) is a Serbian basketball coach for the Qingdao Eagles of the Chinese Basketball Association.

== Coaching career ==
Vukoičić was 19 years old in 1994 when he began working as coach in KK FMP's youth system. He continued there until 2003 when he got promoted to the position of first team assistant coach. He worked under head coaches Aco Petrović, Vlade Đurović, and Boško Đokić.

=== FMP Železnik ===
Vukoičić's first head coaching appointment came in 2005 at FMP where he ended up spending two and a half seasons. He won the 2005–06 Adriatic League title with the club. Next year he led the team to the semifinals of the 2006–07 ULEB Cup and also won the Serbian Cup. He left the position on 14 January 2008.

=== Hemofarm and Oostende in 2018 ===
On 20 March 2008 KK Hemofarm brought Vukoičić in to replace Miroslav Nikolić. Vukoičić finished out the 2007–08 season at the club before moving on. In the summer of 2008, he was hired by Belgian team BC Oostende, but left in October.

=== Bosna ===
In early November 2008, Vukoičić agreed on terms with KK Bosna, six days after the team's previous head coach Alen Abaz resigned in late October following a loss at KK Budućnost Podgorica in the Adriatic League. Goran Šehovac assumed temporary charge for one game before Vukoičić took over with his Bosna debut taking place in Belgrade away at KK Crvena zvezda.

Vukoičić led the Sarajevo team to the 7th place Adriatic League finish with an 11–15 overall win–loss season record. Under Vukoičić's command, KK Bosna had a 9–11 record. On 12 April 2009, following a Bosnia-Herzegovina league loss away at Borac Banja Luka, Vukoičić offered his resignation. It was not accepted, and he continued on as head coach. In late May 2009, during the Bosnian domestic league finals series, he signed a 4-year contract extension with the club. KK Bosna ended up losing the final series versus HKK Široki 0–2.

Vukoičić started the 2009–10 season as head coach but was fired in early December 2009 following a 1–9 start in the Adriatic League, including a 50-point loss to KK Zadar.

=== Mega Vizura ===
In 2010, Vukoičić became head coach of KK Mega Vizura from Belgrade, in the Basketball League of Serbia. In his first season with the club, Mega Vizura finished the season's initial stage in 4th spot with 15–11 record thus qualifying for the final stage (Superliga) of the competition. That year, Mega Vizura finished in last place with 3–11 record.

=== Crvena zvezda ===
On 4 October 2012 he became head coach of the Serbian team Crvena zvezda, replacing recently fired Milivoje Lazić. Arriving to Crvena zvezda for Vukoičić meant getting reunited with Nebojša Čović whom he worked for over a decade in various capacities at FMP Železnik.

On 15 April, days after a loss to Mega Vizura, Vukoičić's firing was announced while Dejan Radonjić who coached Adriatic League rivals KK Budućnost got named as replacement with club president Čović citing "obvious deterioration of form" as the reason for the change.

=== MZT Skopje ===
On 24 June 2013 he became head coach of the Macedonian basketball champion MZT Skopje. In December 2013 he resigned and was replaced with Zoran Martič.

== National team coaching ==
=== Serbia youth teams ===
In 2007, Basketball Federation of Serbia (KSS) named Vukoičić (at the time coaching FMP Železnik at club level) head coach of the Serbian under-20 national team for the upcoming European under-20 Championship in Slovenia and Italy.

Despite losing their opening game versus co-hosts Slovenia, Vukoičić's team quickly got on track, winning all their games until the end, including the final versus Spain and defending the title.

Four years later in 2011, Vukoičić, now coaching Mega Vizura at club level, was asked to coach the Serbian under-18 team at the Euro championships in Poland.

=== Serbia full squad assistant coach ===
In late summer 2012, ahead of the EuroBasket 2013 qualifying matches, Vukoičić joined the national team's coaching setup as one of the three assistants to Serbia national team's head coach Dušan Ivković. Serbia managed to qualify despite losing 5 matches including to the minnows, Estonia.

== See also ==
- List of Radivoj Korać Cup-winning head coaches
