= Boško Đokić =

Serbian basketball coach and journalist (1953–2019)

Personal information
- Born: 26 October 1953 Belgrade, FPR Yugoslavia
- Died: 26 January 2019 (aged 65) Belgrade, Serbia
- Listed height: 1.90 m (6 ft 3 in)
- Coaching career: 1977–2018

Career history

Coaching
- 1983–1985: BASK
- 1987–1989: Slavonika Osijek
- Kolubara
- BFC Beočin
- 1990–1991: Kikinda
- 1991–1992: Profikolor
- 1993–1994: Vojvodina
- Zdravlje
- 1998: FMP Železnik
- 1999: Radnički Belgrade
- 2001: Avtodor Saratov
- 2002–2003: Mašinac
- 2003–2004: Borac Čačak
- 2004–2005: Reflex
- 2005: Avala Ada
- 2006: Zlatorog Laško
- 2006–2007: Swisslion Vršac
- 2007–2009: Ibon Nikšić
- 2009–2010: Radnički Basket
- 2010–2011: FMP
- 2011–2012: Metalac Valjevo
- 2012–2013: OKK Konstantin
- 2013–2014: Napredak Kruševac
- 2015–2016: Napredak Aleksinac
- 2016–2017: Sloga Kraljevo
- 2017–2018: Novi Pazar

Career highlights
- Adriatic League champion (2004); Serbian Cup winner (2004); Serbian League Cup winner (2010)

Boško Đokić (Serbian Cyrillic: Бошко Ђокић; 26 October 1953 – 26 January 2019) was a Serbian professional basketball coach and journalist.

== Coaching career ==
Đokić coached teams in Croatia, Serbia, Slovenia, Montenegro and Russia.

Between August and November 2005, Đokić coached Avala Ada.

== Personal life ==
Đokić was a columnist for Serbian daily newspaper Danas after 2011. As a journalist, he worked for Studio B, Večernje novosti, Sport, Koš and the Trener magazine.

Đokić and his wife Mirjana had a daughter, Milena.

Đokić died on 26 January 2019 in Belgrade, Serbia.

== Career achievements ==
- Adriatic League champion: 1 (with Reflex: 2003–04 )
- Radivoj Korać Cup winner: 1 (with Reflex: 2004–05)
- Serbian League Cup winner: 1 (with Radnički Basket: 2009–10)

== See also ==
- List of ABA League-winning coaches
- List of Radivoj Korać Cup-winning head coaches
