= Dejan Radonjić (basketball) =

Serbian basketball player and coach from Montenegro

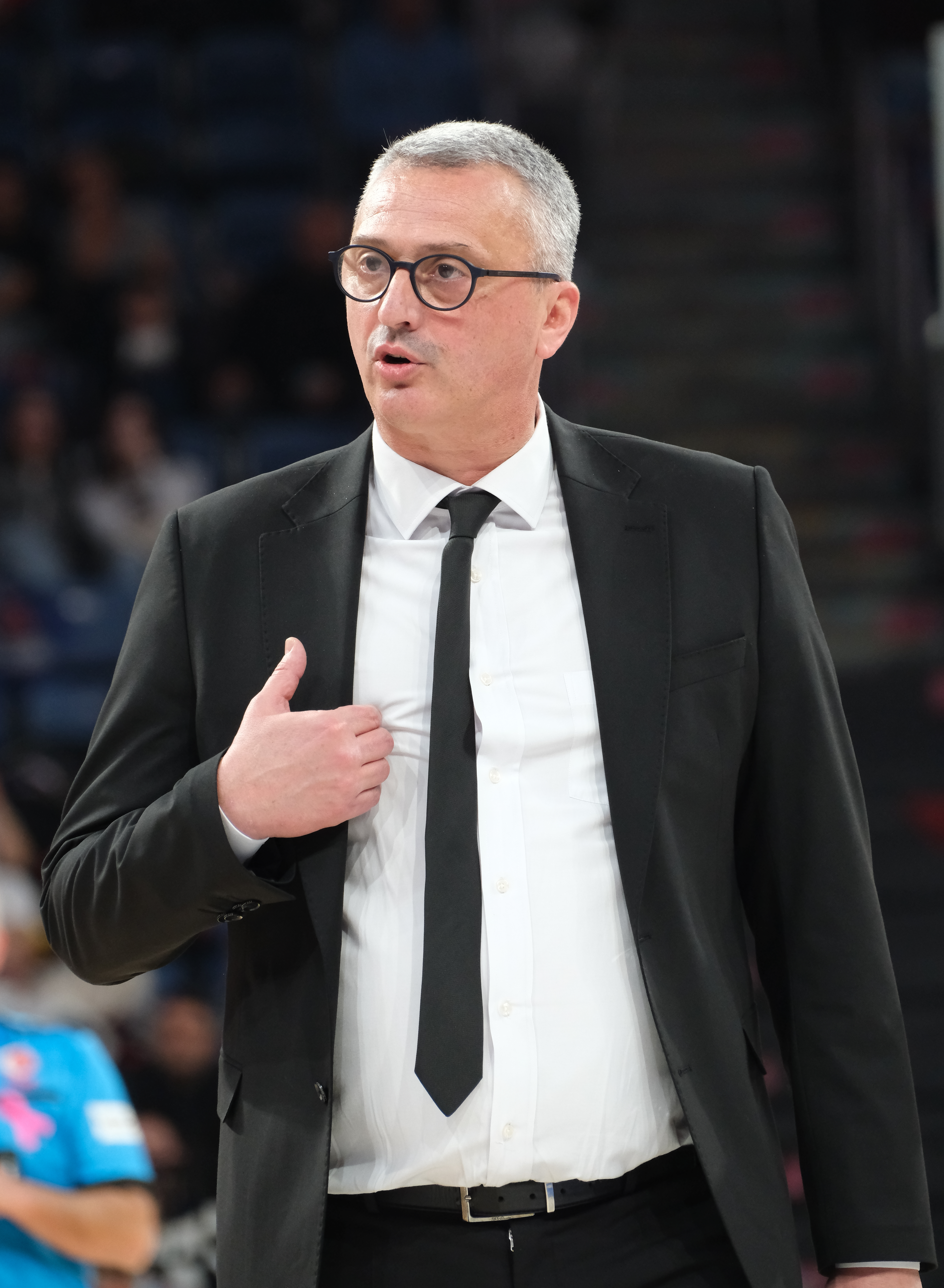
- Radonjić with Bahçeşehir Koleji in 2025

Personal information
- Born: 2 February 1970 (age 56) Titograd, SR Montenegro, Yugoslavia
- Listed height: 1.86 m (6 ft 1 in)

Career information
- NBA draft: 1992: undrafted
- Playing career: 1990–2004
- Position: Point guard
- Coaching career: 2005–present

Career history

Playing
- 1990–1991: Lovćen
- 1991–1993: Budućnost
- 1993–1994: Profikolor
- 1995–1997: Lovćen
- 1997–1998: FMP
- 1998–2002: Budućnost
- 2002–2004: NIS Vojvodina

Coaching
- 2005–2013: Budućnost
- 2013–2017: Crvena zvezda
- 2018–2020: Bayern Munich
- 2020–2022: Crvena zvezda
- 2022–2023: Panathinaikos
- 2023–2025: Bahçeşehir Koleji
- 2026: Zenit Saint Petersburg

Career highlights
- As player: 3× YUBA League champion (1999–2001); Yugoslav Cup winner (2001); As head coach: 5× ABA League champion (2015–2017, 2021, 2022); 7× Montenegrin League champion (2007–2012); 5× Serbian League champion (2015–2017, 2021, 2022); 2× German League champion (2018, 2019); 6× Montenegrin Cup winner (2007–2012); 5× Serbian Cup winner (2014, 2015, 2017, 2021, 2022); 2× ABA League Coach of the Season (2014, 2015)

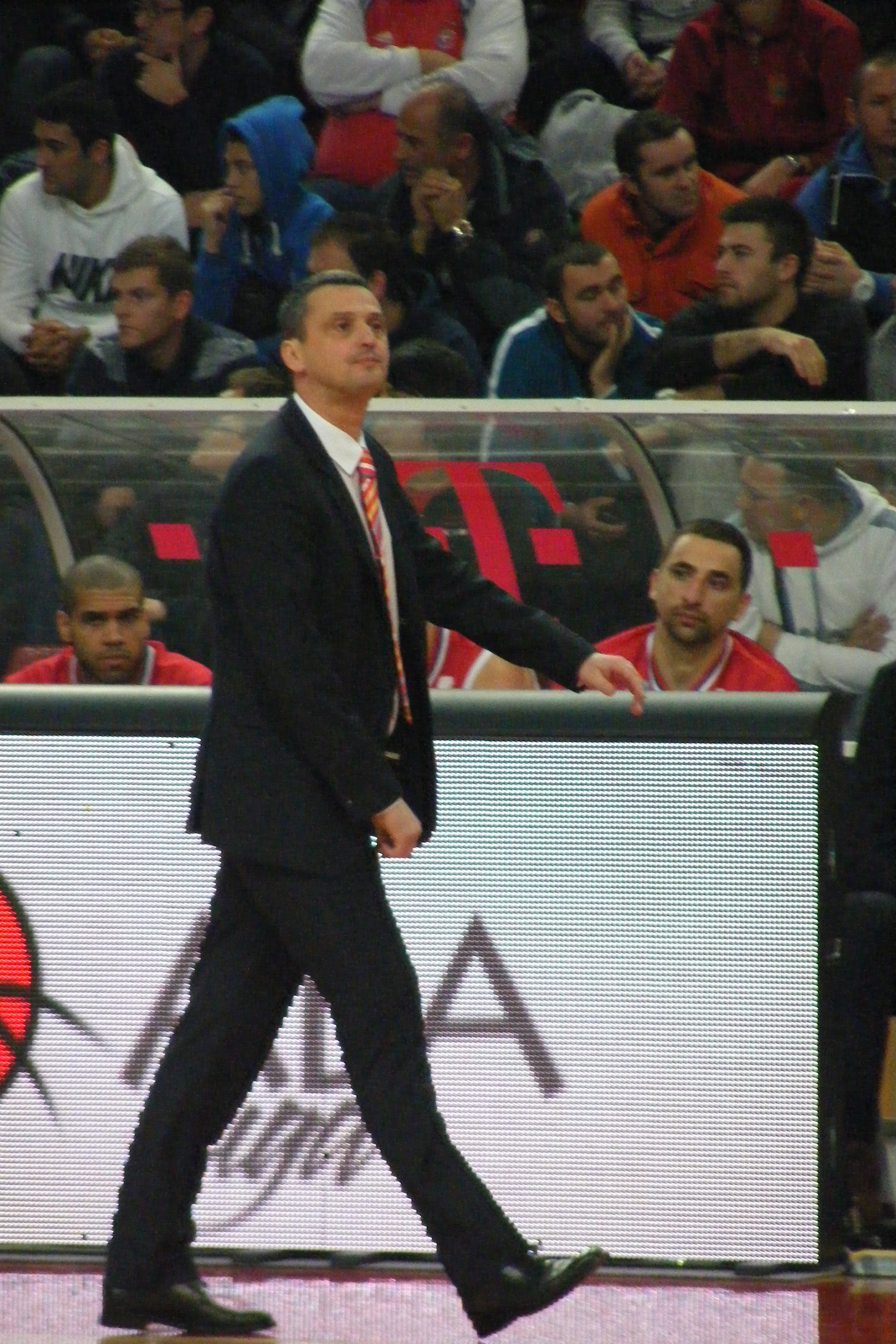
Radonjić with Crvena zvezda in Skopje against MZT in 2013

Dejan Radonjić (Serbian Cyrillic: Дејан Радоњић; born 2 February 1970) is a Montenegrin professional basketball coach and former player. He last worked as the head coach for Zenit Saint Petersburg of the VTB United League.

Standing at 1.86 m (6 ft 1 in), he played in the point guard position for Lovćen, Budućnost, Profikolor, FMP Železnik, and NIS Vojvodina. He won three YUBA League championships and a Yugoslav Cup with Budućnost. He retired as a player with NIS Vojvodina in 2004.

Radonjić became the head coach for Budućnost in 2005. Until 2012, he won seven consecutive Montenegrin League championships and six consecutive Montenegrin Cup tournaments with Budućnost. In 2013, Radonjić joined Serbian team Crvena zvezda. Until 2017, he won both the Adriatic League and Serbian League championships the same 3-in-a-row sequence, as well as three Serbian Cup tournaments. Thereafter, he coached German team Bayern Munich in three seasons, winning two German League championships. In 2021, he returned to Crvena Zvezda.

== Playing career ==
A point guard, Radonjić played 14 seasons in the YUBA League system between 1990 and 2004. During his playing days, he played for Lovćen, Budućnost, Profikolor, FMP Železnik, and NIS Vojvodina. During his second stint with Budućnost (1998–2002), he won three National championships and a Yugoslav Cup. He retired as a player with NIS Vojvodina in 2004.

== Coaching career ==
=== Budućnost (2005–2013) ===
Radonjić began his coaching career back in 2005 at well-known Montenegrin team Budućnost. With them he won seven consecutive Montenegrin League championships, as well as six Montenegrin Cups.

=== Crvena zvezda (2013–2017) ===
In April 2013, following the departure of Vlada Vukoičić, he became the head coach of the Serbian team Crvena zvezda. On 30 June 2015, he signed a two-year extension with Crvena zvezda.

=== Bayern Munich (2018–2020) ===
On 2 April 2018, Radonjić was named the head coach of the German team Bayern Munich, after dismissal of Aleksandar Đorđević. On 7 January 2020, Bayern Munich released head coach Radonjić.

=== Crvena zvezda (2020–2022) ===
On 25 December 2020, Radonjić became the head coach of Crvena zvezda for the second time. On 14 February 2021, Radonjić won his fourth Serbian Cup title following a 73–60 win over Mega Soccerbet in the Final.

On 19 February 2022, Radonjić won his 300th game for Crvena zvezda, in a 72–53 win over Mega Mozzart.

=== Panathinaikos (2022–2023) ===
On 30 June 2022 Radonjić signed a two-year deal with Panathinaikos of the Greek Basket League and the EuroLeague. After poor performance, results and failing to advance in Euroleague play-offs for third year in row, on 21 February 2023 he was fired from Panathinaikos.

=== Bahçeşehir Koleji (2023–2025) ===
On 27 December 2023 he signed with Bahçeşehir Koleji of the BSL. Dejan Radonjic's team Bahçeşehir Koleji took the second place of 2023-24 FIBA Europe Cup trophy against Chemnitz Niners in the final. In June 2025, the team announced he wouldn't continue with the team.

== National team coaching career ==
In 2011, Radonjić had a short stint as the head coach of the Montenegrin national basketball team.

== Career achievements and awards ==
Player

- Yugoslav League champion: 3 (with Budućnost: 1998–99, 1999–00, 2000–01)
- Yugoslav Cup winner: 1 (with Budućnost: 2000–01)

Coach

- ABA League champion: 5 (with Crvena zvezda: 2014–15, 2015–16, 2016–17, 2020–21, 2021–22)
- German League champion: 2 (with Bayern Munich: 2017–18, 2018–19)
- Serbian League champion: 5 (with Crvena zvezda: 2014–15, 2015–16, 2016–17, 2020–21, 2021–22)
- Montenegrin League champion: 6 (with Budućnost: 2006–07, 2007–08, 2008–09, 2009–10, 2010–11, 2011–12)
- Serbian Cup winner: 5 (with Crvena zvezda: 2013–14, 2014–15, 2016–17, 2020–21, 2021–22)
- Montenegrin Cup winner: 6 (with Budućnost: 2006–07, 2007–08, 2008–09, 2009–10, 2010–11, 2011–12)

== Coaching record ==
=== EuroLeague ===
Legend
G	Games coached	W	Games won	L	Games lost	W–L %	Win-loss %

Note: The EuroLeague is not the only competition in which the team played during the season. He also coached in domestic competition, and regional competition if applicable.

Team	Year	G	W	L	W–L%	Result
Crvena zvezda	2013–14	10	4	6	.400	Eliminated in the group stage
Crvena zvezda	2014–15	24	10	14	.417	Eliminated in Top 16 stage
Crvena zvezda	2015–16	27	12	15	.444	Eliminated in Quarterfinal Playoffs
Crvena zvezda	2016–17	30	16	14	.533	Eliminated in the regular season
Bayern Munich	2018–19	30	14	16	.467	Eliminated in the regular season
Bayern Munich	2019–20	17	6	11	.353	Sacked
Crvena zvezda	2020–21	18	5	13	.278	Eliminated in the regular season
Crvena zvezda	2021–22	33	14	19	.424	Eliminated in the regular season
Panathinaikos	2022–23	24	8	16	.333	Sacked
Career		213	89	124	.418	

=== Adriatic League ===
Legend
Regular season	G	Games coached	W	Games won	L	Games lost	W–L %	Win–loss %
Playoffs	PG	Playoff games	PW	Playoff wins	PL	Playoff losses	PW–L %	Playoff win–loss %

Team	Year	G	W	L	W–L%	Finish	PG	PW	PL	PW–L%	Result
Budućnost	2006–07	26	16	10	.615	5th	—	—	—	—	Missed Final Four
Budućnost	2007–08	26	15	11	.577	6th	3	1	2	.333	Lost in First Round
Budućnost	2008–09	26	15	11	.577	6th	—	—	—	—	Missed Final Four
Budućnost	2009–10	26	15	11	.577	5th	—	—	—	—	Missed Final Four
Budućnost	2010–11	26	15	11	.577	4th	1	0	1	.000	Lost in Semifinals
Budućnost	2011–12	26	18	8	.615	4th	1	0	1	.000	Lost in Semifinals
Budućnost	2012–13	26	16	10	.615	5th	—	—	—	—	Missed Final Four
Crvena zvezda	2013–14	26	22	4	.817	1st	1	0	1	.000	Lost in Semifinals
Crvena zvezda	2014–15	26	24	2	.923	1st	8	6	2	.750	Won Championship
Crvena zvezda	2015–16	26	20	6	.769	2nd	5	5	0	1.000	Won Championship
Crvena zvezda	2016–17	26	25	1	.962	1st	6	5	1	.833	Won Championship
Crvena zvezda	2020–21	16	14	2	.875	1st	8	5	3	.625	Won Championship
Career		302	215	87	.712		33	22	11	.667	

== Personal life ==
His son Petar is a basketball coach.

== See also ==
- List of ABA League-winning coaches
- List of KK Crvena zvezda head coaches
- List of Serbian League-winning coaches
- List of Radivoj Korać Cup-winning head coaches
