= Vlada Jovanović =

Serbian basketball coach

Vlade Jovanović
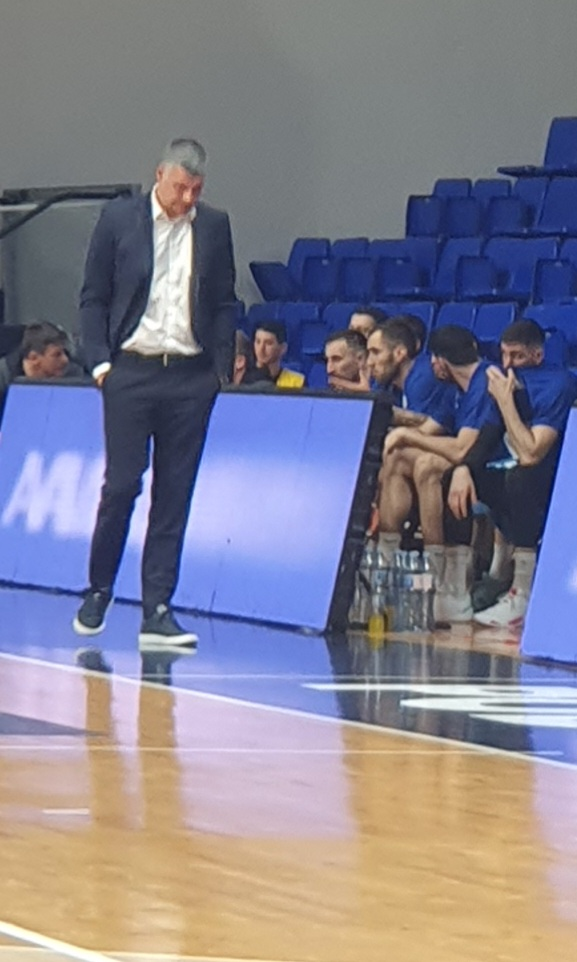
- Jovanović 2023.

Spartak Subotica
- Position: Head coach
- League: Serbian SuperLeague; ABA League; FIBA Champions League

Personal information
- Born: 4 July 1973 (age 53) Čačak, SR Serbia, SFR Yugoslavia

Career information
- NBA draft: 1995: undrafted
- Playing career: 1991–1997
- Coaching career: 1997–present

Career history

Coaching
- 2005–2010: Partizan (assistant)
- 2010–2012: Partizan
- 2012: Donetsk
- 2014: Igokea
- 2016–2018: Lokomotiv Kuban (youth)
- 2018: Lokomotiv Kuban (assistant)
- 2018–2019: Lokomotiv Kuban
- 2019–2020: Shenzhen Aviators (assistant)
- 2020–2022: Mega Basket
- 2022–2023: Budućnost
- 2023–present: Spartak Subotica

Career highlights
- As head coach: ABA League champion (2011); 3× Serbian League champion (2011, 2012, 2026); 2× Serbian Cup winner (2011, 2012); Bosnian League champion (2014); Montenegrin Cup winner (2023); As assistant coach: 4× ABA League champion (2007–2010); 4× Serbian League champion (2007–2010); Serbia and Montenegro League champion (2006); 3× Serbian Cup winner (2008–2010); Russian Cup winner (2018)
Medals
Men's basketball
Head Coach for Serbia
U18 European Championship
Gold medal – first place	2017 Slovakia	U18 Team
Gold medal – first place	2009 France	U18 Team

Vladimir "Vlade" Jovanović (Serbian Cyrillic: Владимир "Владе" Јовановић; born 4 July 1973) is a Serbian professional basketball coach. He currently serves as the head coach for Spartak Subotica of the Serbian SuperLeague, the ABA League, and the FIBA Champions League.

== Early career ==
Jovanović finished primary and high school in Čačak. He graduated from the junior college for coaches in Belgrade in 1999. He is a final year student at the Sports Academy in a basketball study group. During his playing career he was a first-team member of Borac Čačak and Železničar Čačak.

== Coaching career ==
Jovanović started his coaching career in 1997. He was a coach of youth teams of Borac Čačak, Zemun and Partizan Belgrade. In 2005, he was added to the Partizan coaching staff as the first assistant coach to head coach Duško Vujošević. During his tenure as the Partizan assistant coach, he won five Serbian Championships (2006, 2007, 2008, 2009, and 2010), four Adriatic League titles (2007, 2008, 2009 and 2010), and three National Cup titles (2008, 2009, and 2010).

On 28 June 2010, the Partizan managing board promoted him to the club's head coach. In his first season as head coach Jovanović won Serbian Championship title, Radivoj Korać Cup and NLB League trophy. In his second season as head coach Jovanović won the Serbian Championship title and Radivoj Korać Cup. After winning Serbian Championship, he didn't renew his contract with Partizan Belgrade and signed with Donetsk as the new head coach.

In August 2018, Jovanović joined a coaching staff of the Russian team Lokomotiv Kuban. He got fired in March 2019.

=== Mega Basket (2020–22) ===
On 1 June 2020, Jovanović became a head coach for Mega Bemax of the ABA League and the Basketball League of Serbia. He left the club in June 2022.

=== Budućnost (2022–23) ===
On 13 July 2022, Budućnost hired Jovanović as their new head coach.

=== Spartak Subotica (2023–present) ===
In November 2023, Jovanović was named the head coach of Spartak Subotica. During the 2023–24 season, won the ABA League Second Division with the club. In January 2025, he extended his contract with the club for five more seasons. In 2024–25 season, Spartak made the finals of the Serbian League Playoff, where they lost to Partizan Belgrade with 2–0.

== National teams coaching career ==
Jovanović was also a head coach of Serbia under-18 team and has won the gold medal at the 2009 FIBA Europe Under-18 Championship in France. In summer 2010, he coached the same team at the European Championship in Lithuania where they finished fourth. In July 2011, Jovanović was originally supposed to head the Serbian u-19 team at the 2011 FIBA Under-19 World Championship in Latvia, however, the job went to Dejan Mijatović who led the team to the final where they lost to Lithuania.

In 2014, Jovanović was an assistant coach for the Montenegro national team.

== Career achievements ==
As head coach

- ABA League champion: 1 (with Partizan: 2010–11)
- Serbian League champion: 2 (with Partizan: 2010–11, 2011–12)
- Championship of Bosnia and Herzegovina champion: 1 (with Igokea: 2013–14)
- Serbian Cup winner: 2 (with Partizan: 2010–11, 2011–12)

As assistant coach

- ABA League champion: 4 (with Partizan: 2006–07, 2007–08, 2008–09, 2009–10)
- Serbian League champion: 4 (with Partizan: 2006–07, 2007–08, 2008–09, 2009–10)
- Serbia-Montenegro First League champion: 1 (with Partizan: 2005–06)
- Russian Cup winner: 1 (with Lokomotiv Kuban: 2017–18)
- Serbian Cup winner: 3 (with Partizan: 2007–08, 2008–09, 2009–10)

== Coaching record ==
Legend
G	Games coached	W	Games won	L	Games lost	W–L %	Win-loss %

Note: The EuroLeague is not the only competition in which the team played during the season. He also coached in domestic competition, and regional competition if applicable.

Team	Year	G	W	L	W–L%	Result
Partizan	2010–11	16	6	10	.375	Eliminated in Top 16 Stage
Partizan	2011–12	10	4	6	.400	Eliminated in group play
Career		26	10	16	.385	

== Personal life ==
His son Mateja (born 2000) and daughter Marta (born 2002) are basketball players.

== See also ==
- List of ABA League-winning coaches
- List of Radivoj Korać Cup-winning head coaches
