= 2020–21 KK Cedevita Olimpija season =

Cedevita Olimpija
2020–21 season
- Chairman: Tomaž Berločnik
- Head coach: Jurica Golemac
- Arena: Arena Stožice; Tivoli Hall
- Slovenian League: 1st
- Playoffs: Champions
- Adriatic League: 5th
- EuroCup: Top 16
- Adriatic Supercup: Cancelled
- Slovenian Cup: Semifinal
- Slovenian Super Cup: Winner
- Biggest win: +48; 103–55 Podčetrtek (11 May 2021)
- Biggest defeat: –50; 50–100 Helios Suns (11 March 2021)
Home	Away

The 2020–21 season was the second season of KK Cedevita Olimpija since its establishment in 2019. The club competed in the Slovenian League, the Adriatic League, and the EuroCup.

Cedevita Olimpija won their first trophy of the season, the Slovenian Supercup, on 17 September 2020. In May 2021, they won the Slovenian League title after defeating Krka 3–0 in the final.

== Overview ==
The ABA League Assembly and the Basketball Federation of Slovenia cancelled their respective competitions for the 2019–20 season due to the COVID-19 pandemic. On 1 July 2020, forward Mikael Hopkins signed a two-year contract extension.

== Players ==
=== Squad information ===
Note: Flags indicate national team eligibility at FIBA-sanctioned events. Players may hold other non-FIBA nationalities not displayed.

Cedevita Olimpija roster
Players
Coaches
<> <>

Pos.	No.	Nat.	Name	Ht.	Age
PG	6	(Croatia)	Belina, Tomas	1.92 m (6 ft 4 in)	22 – 1 January 2004
G/F	11	(Slovenia)	Blažič, Jaka (C)	1.96 m (6 ft 5 in)	33 – 27 December 1992
G/F	15	(United States)	Brown, Rion	1.98 m (6 ft 6 in)	35 – 9 March 1991
F/C	14	(Slovenia)	Daneu, Žiga	2.06 m (6 ft 9 in)	24 – 10 August 2002
C	27	(Slovenia)	Dimec, Žiga	2.11 m (6 ft 11 in)	33 – 20 February 1993
PG	7	(Slovenia)	Duščak, Dan	1.85 m (6 ft 1 in)	24 – 2 July 2002
PG	30	(Slovenia)	Đurkić, Anže	1.86 m (6 ft 1 in)	22 – 21 November 2003
SF	20	(Slovenia)	Hodžić, Alen	1.91 m (6 ft 3 in)	34 – 11 August 1992
PF	5	(United States)	Hopkins, Mikael	2.06 m (6 ft 9 in)	33 – 23 June 1993
F/C	21	(Hungary)	Jones, Jarrod	2.06 m (6 ft 9 in)	36 – 27 May 1990
PG	4	(Slovenia)	Jovanović, Nil	1.91 m (6 ft 3 in)	23 – 17 April 2003
SF	31	(Slovenia)	Jug, Marcel	1.98 m (6 ft 6 in)	23 – 2 May 2003
F	16	(Slovenia)	Jurković, Robert	2.02 m (6 ft 8 in)	24 – 14 June 2002
C	26	(Slovenia)	Kočevar, Gašper	2.04 m (6 ft 8 in)	22 – 25 January 2004
C	29	(Serbia)	Marinković, Ivan	2.08 m (6 ft 10 in)	32 – 27 November 1993
C	9	(Australia)	Mathiang, Mangok (injured)	2.08 m (6 ft 10 in)	33 – 8 October 1992
SF	8	(Slovenia)	Murić, Edo	2.03 m (6 ft 8 in)	34 – 27 November 1991
C	17	(Slovenia)	Nagode, Klei	2.08 m (6 ft 10 in)	23 – 1 January 2003
G	3	(United States)	Perry, Kendrick	1.83 m (6 ft 0 in)	33 – 23 December 1992
SF	1	(Slovenia)	Radović, Rok	1.99 m (6 ft 6 in)	25 – 4 February 2001
PG	55	(Slovenia)	Rupnik, Luka	1.85 m (6 ft 1 in)	33 – 20 May 1993
F	23	(Slovenia)	Ščuka, Luka	2.08 m (6 ft 10 in)	24 – 23 May 2002
SF	25	(Slovenia)	Todorović, Vukašin	1.98 m (6 ft 6 in)	22 – 14 April 2004

Head coach

- (Slovenia) Jurica Golemac

Assistant coach(es)

- (Croatia) Teo Čizmić
- (Slovenia) Jan Šentjurc

Strength & conditioning coach(es)

- (Croatia) Filip Ujaković

Physiotherapist(s)

- (Slovenia) Rok Žagar
- (Slovenia) Borut Černilogar

Team manager

- (Croatia) Matko Jovanović

Legend

- (C) Team captain
- Injured

=== Players with multiple nationalities ===
- (Croatia) (Slovenia) Tomas Belina
- (Serbia) (Slovenia) Ivan Marinković
- (Hungary) (United States) Jarrod Jones
- (Australia) (South Sudan) Mangok Mathiang

=== Depth chart ===
Pos.	Starting 5	Bench 1	Bench 2
C	Ivan Marinković	Žiga Dimec	Mangok Mathiang
PF	Mikael Hopkins	Jarrod Jones	Luka Ščuka
SF	Edo Murić	Rion Brown	Rok Radović
SG	Jaka Blažič	Alen Hodžić
PG	Kendrick Perry	Luka Rupnik	Dan Duščak

=== Transactions ===
==== Players In ====
No.	Pos.	Nat.	Name	Age	Moving from		Type	Ends	Date	Source
	SG	(Bosnia and Herzegovina)	Aleksa Gatarić	18	Cedevita Junior	(Croatia)	Transfer	Undisclosed	15 May 2020	
3	PG	(United States)	Kendrick Perry	27	Mega Bemax	(Serbia)	End of contract	2021	23 May 2020	
20	SF	(Slovenia)	Alen Hodžić	27	Koper Primorska	(Slovenia)	Parted ways	2022	29 May 2020	
27	C	(Slovenia)	Žiga Dimec	27	Koper Primorska	(Slovenia)	Parted ways	2022	1 June 2020	
19	SF	(Serbia)	Marko Simonović	34	Unicaja Malaga	(Spain)	Loan return	2021	23 June 2020	
7	PG	(Slovenia)	Dan Duščak	18	Real Madrid B	(Spain)	First pro contract	2024	3 July 2020	
9	C	(Australia)	Mangok Mathiang	27	Bahçeşehir Koleji	(Turkey)	End of contract	2021	10 July 2020	
10	PG	(Croatia)	Roko Leni Ukić	35	Antibes Sharks	(France)	End of contract	2021	16 July 2020	
4	SG	(Russia)	Egor Sytnikov	18	Youth system		First pro contract	2024	1 August 2020	
15	G/F	(United States)	Rion Brown	28	Tofaş	(Turkey)	End of contract	2021	7 August 2020	
23	F	(Slovenia)	Luka Ščuka	18	Nova Gorica	(Slovenia)	Transfer	2024	24 September 2020	
21	PF/C	(Hungary)	Jarrod Jones	30	Darüşşafaka	(Turkey)	End of contract	2021	25 September 2020	
55	PG	(Slovenia)	Luka Rupnik	27	Casademont Zaragoza	(Spain)	Transfer	2022	6 December 2020	

==== Players Out ====
No.	Pos.	Nat.	Name	Age	Moving to		Type	Date	Source
2	G/F	(Croatia)	Filip Krušlin	31	Dinamo Sassari	(Italy)	Parted ways	12 April 2020	
33	C	(Germany)	Maik Zirbes	30	Shabab Al Ahli	(United Arab Emirates)	Parted ways	12 April 2020	
13	C	(Bosnia and Herzegovina)	Andrija Stipanović	33	U-BT Cluj-Napoca	(Romania)	Parted ways	12 April 2020	
6	PG	(United States)	Dominic Artis	26	Kolossos Rodou	(Greece)	Parted ways	13 April 2020	
21	PG	(Slovenia)	Domen Bratož	27	Šentjur	(Slovenia)	Parted ways	13 April 2020	
—	SG	(Bosnia and Herzegovina)	Aleksa Gatarić	18	Cedevita Junior	(Croatia)	Loan	15 May 2020	
9	SG	(Slovenia)	Mirko Mulalić	32	Rabotnički	(North Macedonia)	Parted ways	28 May 2020	
17	PF	(Slovenia)	Saša Zagorac	36	Retired		Parted ways	28 May 2020	
4	PF	(Slovenia)	Martin Krampelj	25	GTK Gliwice	(Poland)	Parted ways	28 May 2020	
10	PG	(United States)	Codi Miller-McIntyre	25	Partizan NIS	(Serbia)	End of contract	30 May 2020	
7	SG	(Slovenia)	Petar Vujačić	20	Rogaška	(Slovenia)	Parted ways	16 June 2020	
19	SF	(Serbia)	Marko Simonović	34	Crvena Zvezda	(Serbia)	Parted ways	23 June 2020	
30	G	(Ukraine)	Issuf Sanon	20	Dnipro	(Ukraine)	Parted ways	27 July 2020	
4	SG	(Russia)	Egor Sytnikov	18	Ilirija	(Slovenia)	Loan	11 August 2020	
10	PG	(Croatia)	Roko Leni Ukić	36	Split	(Croatia)	Parted ways	5 January 2021	

== Club ==
=== Technical Staff ===
In August 2020, Jan Šentjurc joined the coaching staff as an assistant coach, while Dragiša Drobnjak left.

The following was the technical staff of Cedevita Olimpija for the 2020–21 season.

Position	Staff member
General Manager	(Croatia) Davor Užbinec
Technical director	(Croatia) Krešimir Novosel
Sports Director	(Slovenia) Sani Bečirovič
Team Manager	(Croatia) Matko Jovanović
Head Coach	(Slovenia) Jurica Golemac
Assistant Coaches	(Croatia) Teo Čizmić
Assistant Coaches	(Slovenia) Jan Šentjurc
Conditioning Coach	(Croatia) Filip Ujaković
Physiotherapist	(Slovenia) Rok Žagar
Physiotherapist	(Slovenia) Borut Černilogar
Physician	(Slovenia) Oskar Zupanc

Source: Coaches & Staff

=== Uniform ===
- Supplier: Adidas
- Main sponsor: Cedevita
- Back sponsor: Triglav (top), Spar (bottom)
- Shorts sponsor: None

Home	Away	Third

== Pre-season and friendlies ==
Win Loss Void

24 August 2020 –	Cibona (Croatia)	Cancelled	(Slovenia) Cedevita Olimpija	Zagreb
		Boxscore		Arena: Dražen Petrović Basketball Hall
Note: Cancelled due to the COVID-19 pandemic in Croatia.

27 August 2020 1	Bayern Munich (Germany)	74–82	(Slovenia) Cedevita Olimpija	Munich
18:00	Scoring by quarter: 21–20, 23–23, 18–20, 12–19
	Pts: Leon Radošević 13; Rebs: not available Asts: not available PIR: not available	Boxscore	Pts: Jaka Blažič 21; Rebs: not available Asts: not available PIR: not available	Arena: Audi Dome; Attendance: BCD; Referees: not available

29 August 2020 2	Ratiopharm Ulm (Germany)	90–89	(Slovenia) Cedevita Olimpija	Ulm
13:00	Scoring by quarter: 27–22, 26–26, 16–22, 21–19
	Pts: Obst, Caupain 15; Rebs: not available Asts: not available PIR: not available	Boxscore	Pts: Kendrick Perry 29; Rebs: Edo Murić 8 Asts: Perry, Hopkins 4 PIR: not available	Arena: Ratiopharm Arena; Attendance: BCD; Referees: not available

2 September 2020 3	Cedevita Olimpija (Slovenia)	93–90	(Czech Republic) ERA Nymburk	Ljubljana
18:00	Scoring by quarter: 27–24, 26–26, 13–16, 27–24
	Pts: Jaka Blažič 23; Rebs: Edo Murić 7 Asts: not available PIR: not available	Boxscore	Pts: Vojtěch Hruban 22; Rebs: not available Asts: not available PIR: not available	Arena: Arena Stožice; Attendance: BCD; Referees: not available

9 September 2020 4	Cedevita Olimpija (Slovenia)	82–65	(Germany) Bayern Munich	Ljubljana
18:00	Scoring by quarter: 24–20, 25–12, 19–18, 14–15
Šport TV 1	Pts: Kendrick Perry 14; Rebs: Ivan Marinković 9 Asts: Blažič, Ukić 5 PIR: not available	Boxscore	Pts: Nick Weiler-Babb 14; Rebs: not available Asts: not available PIR: not available	Arena: Arena Stožice; Attendance: BCD; Referees: not available

12 September 2020 5	Helios Suns (Slovenia)	66–86	(Slovenia) Cedevita Olimpija	Domžale
18:30	Scoring by quarter: 17–17, 20–28, 13–24, 16–17
	Pts: not available Rebs: not available Asts: not available PIR: not available	Boxscore	Pts: Mikael Hopkins 16; Rebs: Mikael Hopkins 9 Asts: not available PIR: not available	Arena: Domžale Sports Hall; Attendance: BCD; Referees: not available

20 September 2020 6	Budućnost VOLI (Montenegro)	72–62	(Slovenia) Cedevita Olimpija	Kranjska Gora
12:00	Scoring by quarter: 17–20, 24–17, 16–8, 15–17
	Pts: Ivanović 20; Rebs: not available Asts: not available PIR: not available	Boxscore	Pts: Blažič 17; Rebs: not available Asts: not available PIR: not available	Arena: Vitranc Hall; Attendance: BCD; Referees: not available

== Competitions ==
=== Overall ===
Competition	Started round	Final position / round	First match	Last match
Slovenian League	Matchday 1	Champions	February 25, 2021	May 30, 2021
Adriatic League	Matchday 1	Matchday 26	September 19, 2020	May 27, 2021
EuroCup	Matchday 1	Top16 Round 6	September 30, 2020	March 9, 2021
Adriatic Supercup	Never started	Cancelled	None	
Slovenian Cup	Quarterfinal	Semifinal	May 11, 2021	May 22, 2021
Slovenian Supercup	Final	Winner	September 17, 2020	

Updated to match played June 7, 2021
Source: Competitions

=== Overview ===
Competition	Record							
Competition	Pld	W	D	L	PF	PA	PD	Win %
Slovenian League	10	7	0	3	773	729	+44	70.00
Slovenian League Playoffs	7	7	0	0	597	417	+180	100.00
Adriatic League	26	18	0	8	2,116	1,947	+169	69.23
EuroCup Regular season	10	7	0	3	838	737	+101	70.00
EuroCup Top 16	6	3	0	3	478	486	−8	50.00
Slovenian Cup	2	1	0	1	183	137	+46	50.00
Slovenian Supercup	1	1	0	0	78	67	+11	100.00
Total	62	44	0	18	5,063	4,520	+543	70.97

Last updated: June 7, 2021
Source: Competitions

=== Slovenian League ===
The club joined the League in the Championship Group of the 2020–21 season.

==== Standings ====
Pos	Team	Pld	W	L	PF	PA	PD	Pts	Qualification
1	Cedevita Olimpija	10	7	3	773	729	+44	17	Qualification to playoffs
2	Krka	10	6	4	830	764	+66	16	Qualification to playoffs
3	Rogaška	10	6	4	791	807	−16	16	Qualification to playoffs
4	Helios Suns	10	5	5	727	709	+18	15	Qualification to playoffs
5	GGD Šenčur	10	3	7	775	773	+2	13	Qualification to playoffs

Source: KZS.si

==== Results summary ====
Overall						Home					Away				
Pld	W	L	PF	PA	PD	W	L	PF	PA	PD	W	L	PF	PA	PD
10	7	3	773	729	+44	4	1	423	343	+80	3	2	350	386	−36

Last updated: April 30, 2021.
Source: Competitive matches

==== Results by round ====
Round	1	2	3	4	5	6	7	8	9	10
Ground	H	H	A	H	A	A	A	H	A	H
Result	W	L	L	W	W	L	W	W	W	W
Position	2	3	4	3	3	2	2	2	3	1

Last updated: April 30, 2021.
Source: Competitive matches
Ground: A = Away; H = Home; R = Rest. Result: L = Loss; W = Win; R = Rest; P = Postponed.

Win Loss

==== Matches ====
Note: All times are CET (UTC+1) as listed by Slovenian League. Some games were played behind closed doors (BCD) due to the COVID-19 pandemic in Slovenia.

25 February 2021 1	Cedevita Olimpija	67–60	GGD Šenčur	Ljubljana
19:00	Scoring by quarter: 15–13, 23–13, 7–15, 22–19
	Pts: Ščuka 24; Rebs: Ščuka 11; Asts: Radović 6 PIR: Ščuka 24	Boxscore	Pts: Martinčič 19; Rebs: Murić 15; Asts: Rizvić 3 PIR: Murić 23	Arena: Arena Stožice; Referees: Boris Krejić, Primož Pipan, Nace Mohorič

4 March 2021 2	Cedevita Olimpija	77–80	Rogaška	Ljubljana
19:00	Scoring by quarter: 20–25, 17–12, 23–30, 17–13
	Pts: Ščuka 23; Rebs: Duščak 11; Asts: Duščak 7 PIR: Duščak 27	Boxscore	Pts: Vujačić 15; Rebs: Gabrovšek 9 Asts: Nichols 11; PIR: Nichols 16	Arena: Arena Stožice; Referees: Blaž Zupančič, Domen Krajnc, Primož Pipan

11 March 2021 3	Helios Suns	100–50	Cedevita Olimpija	Domžale
18:00	Scoring by quarter: 21–10, 23–12, 31–15, 25–13
Sport Klub	Pts: Oman 24; Rebs: Mahkovic 7 Asts: three players 5 PIR: Oman 27	Boxscore	Pts: Ščuka 22; Rebs: Ščuka 9 Asts: Jovanović, Daneu 2 PIR: Ščuka 17	Arena: Komunalni center Hall; Referees: Goran Grbić, Srečko Savić, Matic Palčič

16 March 2021 4	Cedevita Olimpija	99–65	Terme Olimia Podčetrtek	Ljubljana
19:00	Scoring by quarter: 22–10, 29–23, 27–17, 21–15
	Pts: Jones 19; Rebs: Jones 9 Asts: Rupnik 11; PIR: Jones 27	Boxscore	Pts: Cerkovnik 13; Rebs: Cerkovnik 9 Asts: three players 3 PIR: Cerkovnik 22	Arena: Arena Stožice; Referees: Matej Špendl, Domen Krajnc, Grega Oprčkal

23 March 2021 5	Krka	63–76	Cedevita Olimpija	Novo Mesto
20:30	Scoring by quarter: 24–15, 10–24, 17–21, 12–16
Sport Klub	Pts: Vučetić 13; Rebs: Milovanović 6 Asts: Lapornik 4 PIR: Vučetić, Vrabac 10	Boxscore	Pts: Jones, Hopkins 19; Rebs: Hopkins 10; Asts: Perry 5 PIR: Hopkins 25	Arena: Leon Štukelj Hall; Referees: Sašo Petek, Goran Grbić, Žiga Rener

18 March 2021 6	GGD Šenčur	100–63	Cedevita Olimpija	Šenčur
19:00	Scoring by quarter: 26–13, 30–15, 17–14, 27–21
	Pts: Martinčič 20; Rebs: Murić 10; Asts: Novak 6 PIR: Murić 29	Boxscore	Pts: Radović 17; Rebs: Radović 7 Asts: Duščak 6 PIR: Ščuka 14	Arena: Šenčur Sports Hall; Referees: Goran Grbić, Edo Javor, Žiga Rener

29 April 2021 7	Rogaška	66–88	Cedevita Olimpija	Rogaška Slatina
19:00	Scoring by quarter: 18–23, 16–15, 9–26, 23–24
	Pts: Nichols 21; Rebs: Šantelj 6 Asts: Nichols 6 PIR: Nichols 22	Boxscore	Pts: Perry 13; Rebs: Ščuka 8 Asts: Hodžić 4 PIR: Perry 18	Arena: Rogaška Slatina Hall; Referees: Matej Špendl, Domen Krajnc, Matic Palčič
Note: Originally to be scheduled to 2 April 2021, due to the COVID-19 restrictions in Slovenia it was postponed and rescheduled to 29 April 2021.

15 April 2021 8	Cedevita Olimpija	81–66	Helios Suns	Ljubljana
19:00	Scoring by quarter: 19–19, 18–20, 18–13, 26–14
	Pts: Duščak 26; Rebs: Marinković 11; Asts: Duščak 8 PIR: Duščak 23	Boxscore	Pts: Oman 15; Rebs: Oman, Keely 5 Asts: Ferme 9 PIR: Oman 16	Arena: Arena Stožice; Referees: Boris Krejić, Žiga Rener, Matic Palčič

21 April 2021 9	Terme Olimia Podčetrtek	57–73	Cedevita Olimpija	Podčetrtek
19:00	Scoring by quarter: 22–15, 14–26, 11–17, 10–15
	Pts: Strnad 20; Rebs: Cerkovnik 7 Asts: Strnad 4 PIR: Strnad 15	Boxscore	Pts: Hopkins 13; Rebs: Murić 10; Asts: Duščak 5 PIR: Hopkins 17	Arena: Podčetrtek Hall; Referees: Goran Grbić, Damjan Gajšek, Blaž Smrekar

24 April 2021 10	Cedevita Olimpija	99–72	Krka	Ljubljana
18:00	Scoring by quarter: 24–30, 26–13, 25–19, 24–10
Sport Klub	Pts: Brown 17; Rebs: Duščak 5 Asts: Perry 8 PIR: Duščak 20	Boxscore	Pts: Vrabac 17; Rebs: Vrabac 6 Asts: Barič 5 PIR: Vrabac 18	Arena: Arena Stožice; Referees: Blaž Zupančič, Milan Španič, Primož Pipan

==== Playoffs ====
Note: All times are CET (UTC+1) as listed by Slovenian League. Some games were played behind closed doors (BCD) due to the COVID-19 pandemic in Slovenia.

4 May 2021 Quarterfinals 1	Cedevita Olimpija	97–48	Hopsi Polzela	Ljubljana
19:30	Scoring by quarter: 34–16, 16–5, 23–12, 24–15
	Pts: Ščuka 18; Rebs: Jones 9 Asts: Duščak 7 PIR: Ščuka 21	Boxscore	Pts: Jurček 22; Rebs: Miljković 11; Asts: Collins 5 PIR: Jurček 16	Arena: Arena Stožice; Referees: Blaž Zupančič, Primož Pipan, Aleks Kuzmin

6 May 2021 Quarterfinals 2	Hopsi Polzela	70–87	Cedevita Olimpija	Polzela
	Scoring by quarter: 24–15, 13–26, 22–17, 11–29
	Pts: Kosič 19; Rebs: three players 6 Asts: Kosič 6 PIR: Kosič 24	Boxscore	Pts: Blažič 22; Rebs: Jones 9 Asts: Rupnik 7 PIR: Blažič 24	Arena: Polzela Sports Hall; Referees: Marko Vučković, Milan Španič, Matic Palčič

14 May 2021 Semifinals 1	Cedevita Olimpija	89–58	Helios Suns	Ljubljana
20:30	Scoring by quarter: 20–18, 18–18, 24–11, 27–11
Sport Klub	Pts: Jones 19; Rebs: Blažič 8 Asts: Perry 7 PIR: Jones 22	Boxscore	Pts: Lorbek 17; Rebs: Oman 6 Asts: Sekulović 3 PIR: Lorbek 14	Arena: Arena Stožice; Referees: Saša Pukl, Domen Krajnc, Nace Mohorič

17 May 2021 Semifinals 2	Helios Suns	64–79	Cedevita Olimpija	Domžale
18:00	Scoring by quarter: 16–26, 12–24, 19–21, 17–8
Sport Klub	Pts: Lorbek 17; Rebs: Oman 7 Asts: Ferme 10; PIR: Lorbek 14	Boxscore	Pts: Brown 16; Rebs: Jones 7 Asts: Rupnik 7 PIR: Brown 21	Arena: Komunalni center Hall; Referees: Marko Vučković, Blaž Zupančič, Srečko Savić

26 May 2021 Finals 1	Cedevita Olimpija	90–45	Krka	Ljubljana
20:30
Sport Klub		Boxscore		Arena: Arena Stožice

28 May 2021 Finals 2	Krka	64–75	Cedevita Olimpija	Novo Mesto
16:00
Sport Klub		Boxscore		Arena: Leon Štukelj Hall

30 May 2021 Finals 3	Cedevita Olimpija	80–68	Krka	Ljubljana
17:30
Sport Klub		Boxscore		Arena: Arena Stožice

=== Adriatic League ===
==== Regular season ====
Pos	Team	Pld	W	L	PF	PA	PD	Pts	Qualification or relegation
3	(Montenegro) Mornar	26	19	7	2066	1890	+176	45	Advance to the playoffs
4	(Bosnia and Herzegovina) Igokea	26	19	7	1973	1846	+127	45	Advance to the playoffs
5	(Slovenia) Cedevita Olimpija	26	18	8	2116	1947	+169	44	
6	(Serbia) Mega Soccerbet	26	14	12	1996	1955	+41	40	
7	(Serbia) Partizan NIS	26	13	13	2003	1903	+100	39	

Source: ABA League

==== Results summary ====
Overall						Home					Away				
Pld	W	L	PF	PA	PD	W	L	PF	PA	PD	W	L	PF	PA	PD
26	18	8	2116	1947	+169	11	2	1080	942	+138	7	6	1036	1005	+31

Last updated: April 28, 2021.
Source: Competitive matches

==== Results by round ====
Round	1	2	3	4	5	6	7	8	9	10	11	12	13	14	15	16	17	18	19	20	21	22	23	24	25	26
Ground	H	A	H	A	H	A	H	H	A	H	A	H	A	A	H	A	H	A	H	A	A	H	A	H	A	H
Result	W	W	W	L	W	L	W	W	W	W	L	L	W	W	W	W	W	L	W	W	L	W	L	L	W	W
Position	7	3	2	3	5	9	6	5	10	8	10	9	7	7	7	4	4	4	4	3	5	5	6	6	5	5

Last updated: April 28, 2021.
Source: Competitive matches
Ground: A = Away; H = Home; R = Rest. Result: L = Loss; W = Win; R = Rest; P = Postponed.

Win Loss

==== Matches ====
Note: All times are local CET (UTC+1) as listed by the ABA League. Some games were played behind closed doors (BCD) due to the COVID-19 pandemic in Europe.

4 October 2020 1	Cedevita Olimpija (Slovenia)	77–69	(Slovenia) Krka	Ljubljana
20:00	Scoring by quarter: 15–21, 18–15, 25–17, 19–16
	Pts: Brown 21; Rebs: Brown 6 Asts: Perry 6 PIR: Brown 29	Boxscore	Pts: Stipčević 18; Rebs: Vrabac 7 Asts: Barič, Vrabac 2 PIR: Stipčević 20	Arena: Arena Stožice; Attendance: 500; Referees: Damir Javor, Mario Majkić, Matej Špendl

22 October 2020 2	Koper Primorska (Slovenia)	0–20	(Slovenia) Cedevita Olimpija	Koper
17:00	Scoring by quarter: ~~21–27~~, ~~18–27~~, ~~6–27~~, ~~20–21~~
	Pts: ~~Vončina 21~~; Rebs: ~~Macura 9~~; Asts: ~~Rojc 6~~; PIR: ~~Vončina 23~~	Boxscore	Pts: ~~Perry 17~~; Rebs: ~~Marinković 10~~; Asts: ~~Perry 6~~; PIR: ~~Perry 29~~	Arena: Arena Bonifika; Referees: Sašo Petek, Gordan Terlević, Edo Javor
Note: Originally to be scheduled to 10 October, due to the Cedevita Olimpija roster quarantine it was postponed and rescheduled to 22 October. Cedevita Olimpija mts won 102–65 over Koper Primorska. On 17 December 2020, the result was overturned 20–0 for Cedevita Olimpija, following the Koper Primoprska disqualification from the competition. The players statistics were annulled.

16 October 2020 3	Cedevita Olimpija (Slovenia)	94–66	(Croatia) Split	Ljubljana
20:00	Scoring by quarter: 19–19, 23–19, 39–14, 13–14
	Pts: Jones 19; Rebs: Hopkins 8 Asts: Perry 8 PIR: Perry 30	Boxscore	Pts: Luković 12; Rebs: Vranković 5 Asts: Perković, Čampara 3 PIR: Čampara 15	Arena: Tivoli Hall; Referees: Sreten Radović, Radoš Arsenijević, Ivan Stefanović

25 October 2020 4	Partizan NIS (Serbia)	86–77	(Slovenia) Cedevita Olimpija	Belgrade
19:00	Scoring by quarter: 16–19, 22–21, 26–24, 22–13
Arena Sport, B92	Pts: Miller-McIntyre 17; Rebs: Thomas 12; Asts: Gordić 7 PIR: Thomas 21	Boxscore	Pts: Blažič 24; Rebs: Hopkins 13; Asts: Perry 5 PIR: Blažič 29	Arena: Ranko Žeravica Sports Hall; Attendance: 30; Referees: Tomislav Hordov, Miloš Koljenšić, Josip Radojković

21 January 2021 5	Cedevita Olimpija (Slovenia)	95–84	(Montenegro) Budućnost VOLI	Ljubljana
19:00	Scoring by quarter: 16–19, 26–17, 33–20, 20–28
	Pts: Blažič 28; Rebs: Hopkins 9 Asts: Perry 5 PIR: Blažič 31	Boxscore	Pts: Ejim 18; Rebs: Ejim 6 Asts: Cobbs 5 PIR: Ivanović 20	Arena: Arena Stožice; Referees: Damir Javor, Uroš Obrknežević, Ivan Stefanović
Note: Originally to be scheduled to 1 November 2020, due to the Budućnost roster quarantine it was postponed and rescheduled to 5 January 2021, then to 19 January 2021.

30 December 2020 6	FMP (Serbia)	91–88	(Slovenia) Cedevita Olimpija	Belgrade
21:00	Scoring by quarter: 20–27, 24–17, 24–24, 23–20
	Pts: Radovanović 28; Rebs: Radovanović 12; Asts: Čović 8 PIR: Radovanović 39	Boxscore	Pts: Jones 24; Rebs: Hopkins 12; Asts: Blažič 7 PIR: Jones 21	Arena: Železnik Hall; Attendance: 40; Referees: Josip Radojković, Krunoslav Peić, Gordan Terlević
Note: Originally to be scheduled to 8 November, due to the FMP roster quarantine it was postponed and rescheduled to 18 December 2020 and again to 30 December.

15 November 2020 7	Cedevita Olimpija (Slovenia)	97–88	(Serbia) Borac	Ljubljana
17:00	Scoring by quarter: 25–25, 24–14, 24–18, 24–31
	Pts: Blažič 23; Rebs: Blažič, Brown 8 Asts: Perry 6 PIR: Blažič 29	Boxscore	Pts: Narandžić 17; Rebs: Narandžić 8 Asts: Smith, Jones 4 PIR: Narandžić 29	Arena: Arena Stožice; Referees: Saša Pukl, Marko Juras, Vladimir Vesković

22 November 2020 8	Cedevita Olimpija (Slovenia)	103–92(OT)	(Bosnia and Herzegovina) Igokea	Ljubljana
19:00	Scoring by quarter: 23–18, 24–27, 20–18, 20–24, Overtime: 16–5
	Pts: Perry 27; Rebs: Blažič, Brown 6 Asts: Perry 9 PIR: Perry 35	Boxscore	Pts: Waller 17; Rebs: Pot 6 Asts: Atić 7 PIR: Pot, Waller 17	Arena: Arena Stožice; Referees: Milivoje Jovčić, Milan Nedović, Radoš Arsenijević

10 January 2021 9	Zadar (Croatia)	78–80	(Slovenia) Cedevita Olimpija	Zadar
17:00	Scoring by quarter: 12–20, 19–20, 26–26, 21–14
	Pts: Justice 20; Rebs: Carter 6 Asts: Mavra 5 PIR: Justice 19	Boxscore	Pts: Blažič 23; Rebs: Brown 8 Asts: Blažič 5 PIR: Blažič 18	Arena: Krešimir Ćosić Hall; Attendance: 1 Referees: Igor Dragojević, Uroš Nikolić, Aleksandar Milojević
Note: Originally to be scheduled to 5 December 2020, due to the Zadar roster quarantine it was postponed and rescheduled to 10 January 2021.

13 December 2020 10	Cedevita Olimpija (Slovenia)	100–75	(Croatia) Cibona	Ljubljana
21:00	Scoring by quarter: 27–19, 21–10, 31–18, 21–28
	Pts: Jones 18; Rebs: three players 6 Asts: Ukić 8 PIR: Jones 23	Boxscore	Pts: Novačić 15; Rebs: Nakić; Asts: Nakić, Reynolds 4 PIR: Reynolds 18	Arena: Arena Stožice; Referees: Matej Boltauzer, Sreten Radović, Edo Javor

14 April 2021 11	Crvena zvezda mts (Serbia)	82–81	(Slovenia) Cedevita Olimpija	Belgrade
18:00	Scoring by quarter: 24–24, 28–27, 17–14, 13–16
	Pts: Loyd 19; Rebs: Kuzmić 7 Asts: Walden 7 PIR: Loyd, Walden 19	Boxscore	Pts: Perry 19; Rebs: Brown 9 Asts: Blažič, Rupnik 5 PIR: Perry 16	Arena: Aleksandar Nikolić Hall; Attendance: 0 Referees: Uroš Nikolić, Milan Nedović, Dragan Porobić
Note: Originally to be scheduled to 20 December, due to the Crvena zvezda roster quarantine it was postponed and rescheduled to 14 April 2021.

27 December 2020 12	Cedevita Olimpija (Slovenia)	88–93	(Montenegro) Mornar	Ljubljana
19:00	Scoring by quarter: 15–33, 23–22, 26–19, 24–19
	Pts: Blažič 24; Rebs: Blažič 9 Asts: Blažič 5 PIR: Blažič 28	Boxscore	Pts: Pullen 36; Rebs: Jeremić, Luković 6 Asts: Pullen 5 PIR: Pullen 37	Arena: Arena Stožice; Referees: Milan Nedović, Matej Špendl, Rok Misson

2 January 2021 13	Mega Soccerbet (Serbia)	88–93	(Slovenia) Cedevita Olimpija	Belgrade
19:00	Scoring by quarter: 29–28, 20–20, 21–24, 18–21
	Pts: Petrušev, Simonović 21; Rebs: Simonović 8 Asts: Novak 7 PIR: Petrušev 28	Boxscore	Pts: Perry 21; Rebs: Jones 6 Asts: Blažič 7 PIR: Perry 21	Arena: Ranko Žeravica Sports Hall; Attendance: 60; Referees: Tomislav Hordov, Milivoje Jovčić, Denis Hadžić

24 February 2021 14	Krka (Slovenia)	88–95	(Slovenia) Cedevita Olimpija	Novo Mesto
20:00	Scoring by quarter: 35–23, 22–27, 15–23, 16–22
	Pts: Camphor 22; Rebs: Škifić 5 Asts: Barič, Škedelj 3 PIR: Camphor 17	Boxscore	Pts: Hopkins 23; Rebs: Hopkins 12; Asts: Perry 5 PIR: Hopkins 39	Arena: Leon Štukelj Hall; Referees: Matej Boltauzer, Saša Pukl, Matej Špendl
Note: Originally to be scheduled to 9 January 2021, due to the Krka roster quarantine it was postponed and rescheduled to 10 February. Due to the Cedevita Olimpija roster quarantine it was postponed again and rescheduled to 24 February.

17 January 2021 15	Cedevita Olimpija (Slovenia)	20–0	(Slovenia) Koper Primorska	Ljubljana
		Boxscore		Arena: Arena Stožice
Note: The game was not played due to the Koper Primoprska disqualification from the competition.

24 January 2021 16	Split (Croatia)	81–98	(Slovenia) Cedevita Olimpija	Split
15:00	Scoring by quarter: 13–23, 23–20, 23–29, 22–26
	Pts: Luković 16; Rebs: Marić 6 Asts: Ukić, Čampara 6 PIR: Marić 19	Boxscore	Pts: Jones 20; Rebs: Blažič 6 Asts: Rupnik 7 PIR: Jones 23	Arena: Gripe Small Hall; Attendance: 1 Referees: Sreten Radović, Damir Javor, Krunoslav Peić

30 January 2021 17	Cedevita Olimpija (Slovenia)	78–65	(Serbia) Partizan NIS	Ljubljana
19:00	Scoring by quarter: 22–18, 18–19, 22–18, 16–10
	Pts: Blažič 28; Rebs: Hopkins 9 Asts: three players 3 PIR: Blažič 30	Boxscore	Pts: Ognjen Jaramaz 15; Rebs: Thomas 7 Asts: Paige, Janković 2 PIR: Ognjen Jaramaz 16	Arena: Arena Stožice; Referees: Tomislav Hordov, Igor Dragojević, Miloš Koljenšić

8 April 2021 18	Budućnost VOLI (Montenegro)	89–75	(Slovenia) Cedevita Olimpija	Podgorica
18:00	Scoring by quarter: 28–23, 15–25, 25–15, 21–12
	Pts: Cobbs 24; Rebs: Ejim 9 Asts: Ivanović 6 PIR: Cobbs 31	Boxscore	Pts: Blažič 26; Rebs: Hopkins 8 Asts: Blažič, Rupnik 3 PIR: Blažič 26	Arena: Morača Sports Center; Referees: Milivoje Jovčić, Uroš Nikolić, Luka Kardum
Note: Originally to be scheduled to 6 February 2021, due to the Cedevita Olimpija roster quarantine it was postponed and rescheduled to 8 April 2021.

27 February 2021 19	Cedevita Olimpija (Slovenia)	94–86	(Serbia) FMP	Ljubljana
19:00	Scoring by quarter: 27–22, 31–29, 18–17, 18–18
	Pts: Brown 17; Rebs: Jones 7 Asts: Rupnik 8 PIR: Brown 22	Boxscore	Pts: Nenadić 22; Rebs: Đorđević 9 Asts: four players 2 PIR: Nenadić 28	Arena: Arena Stožice; Referees: Luka Kardum, Ernard Karović, Bojan Kruljac

6 March 2021 20	Borac (Serbia)	82–95	(Slovenia) Cedevita Olimpija	Čačak
17:00	Scoring by quarter: 20–27, 22–29, 19–23, 21–16
	Pts: Jones 26; Rebs: Gavrilović 8 Asts: Jones 6 PIR: Jones 36	Boxscore	Pts: Perry 21; Rebs: Brown 7 Asts: Perry 8 PIR: Perry 26	Arena: Borac Hall; Referees: Saša Pukl, Uroš Obrknežević, Gordan Terlević

13 March 2021 21	Igokea (Bosnia and Herzegovina)	76–70	(Slovenia) Cedevita Olimpija	Laktaši
19:00	Scoring by quarter: 17–15, 18–23, 28–20, 13–12
	Pts: Clemmons 16; Rebs: Atić 8 Asts: Clemmons, Carmichael 5 PIR: Clemmons 22	Boxscore	Pts: Perry 13; Rebs: Hopkins 11; Asts: Perry 4 PIR: Hopkins 17	Arena: Laktaši Sports Hall; Referees: Sreten Radović, Josip Radojković, Bojan Kruljac

20 March 2021 22	Cedevita Olimpija (Slovenia)	77–56	(Croatia) Zadar	Ljubljana
21:00	Scoring by quarter: 20–12, 14–9, 20–21, 23–14
	Pts: Brown 20; Rebs: Hopkins 8 Asts: Perry 5 PIR: Hopkins 26	Boxscore	Pts: Vuković 16; Rebs: Vuković 10; Asts: Mavra 5 PIR: Vuković 17	Arena: Arena Stožice; Referees: Uroš Nikolić, Sašo Petek, Radoš Savović

20 April 2021 23	Cibona (Croatia)	93–83	(Slovenia) Cedevita Olimpija	Zagreb
17:00	Scoring by quarter: 24–19, 17–24, 19–17, 33–23
	Pts: Planinić 24; Rebs: Prkačin 7 Asts: Radovčić 8 PIR: Planinić 29	Boxscore	Pts: Perry 23; Rebs: Jones 5 Asts: Blažič, Perry 6 PIR: Perry 28	Arena: Dražen Petrović Hall; Attendance: 20; Referees: Damir Javor, Ernard Karović, Marko Pecelj
Note: Originally to be scheduled to 26 March 2021, due to the Cedevita Olimpija roster quarantine it was postponed and rescheduled to 20 April 2021.

18 April 2021 24	Cedevita Olimpija (Slovenia)	72–89	(Serbia) Crvena zvezda mts	Ljubljana
17:00	Scoring by quarter: 23–20, 9–24, 24–19, 16–26
	Pts: Perry 29; Rebs: Jones 6 Asts: Brown 4 PIR: Perry 28	Boxscore	Pts: Dobrić 26; Rebs: Loyd, Nnoko 5 Asts: Loyd 4 PIR: Dobrić, Loyd 27	Arena: Arena Stožice; Attendance: 0 Referees: Tomislav Hordov, Josip Radojković, Gordan Terlević
Note: Originally to be scheduled to 4 April 2021, due to a large number of confirmed positive COVID-19 cases in Crvena zvezda mts team it was postponed, and rescheduled to 18 April 2021.

11 April 2021 25	Mornar (Montenegro)	71–81	(Slovenia) Cedevita Olimpija	Bar
21:00	Scoring by quarter: 20–23, 20–21, 18–20, 13–17
	Pts: Whitehead 24; Rebs: Vranješ, Smith 5 Asts: Gordić 5 PIR: Whitehead 23	Boxscore	Pts: Perry 21; Rebs: Blažič, Perry 7 Asts: Perry 5 PIR: Perry 24	Arena: Topolica Sport Hall; Attendance: 1 Referees: Sreten Radović, Ilija Belošević, Tomislav Vovk

27 April 2021 26	Cedevita Olimpija (Slovenia)	85–79	(Serbia) Mega Soccerbet	Ljubljana
18:00	Scoring by quarter: 19–30, 20–20, 26–15, 20–14
	Pts: Blažič 30; Rebs: Brown 8 Asts: Blažič 7 PIR: Blažič 30	Boxscore	Pts: Simonović 15; Rebs: Simonović 19; Asts: Smith 8 PIR: Simonović 24	Arena: Arena Stožice; Referees: Sreten Radović, Mario Majkić, Edo Javor

=== EuroCup ===
==== Regular season: Standings ====
Pos	Team	Pld	W	L	PF	PA	PD	Qualification
1	(Spain) Herbalife Gran Canaria	10	8	2	831	765	+66	Advance to Top 16
2	(Slovenia) Cedevita Olimpija	10	7	3	838	737	+101	Advance to Top 16
3	(Italy) Dolomiti Energia Trento	10	6	4	738	713	+25	Advance to Top 16
4	(France) Nanterre 92	10	4	6	791	806	−15	Advance to Top 16
5	(Turkey) Frutti Extra Bursaspor	10	3	7	853	907	−54	
6	(Greece) Promitheas	10	2	8	757	880	−123	

Source: EuroCup Basketball
Rules for classification: All points scored in extra period(s) were not counted in the standings, nor for any tie-break situation.

==== Regular season: Results summary ====
Overall						Home					Away				
Pld	W	L	PF	PA	PD	W	L	PF	PA	PD	W	L	PF	PA	PD
10	7	3	838	737	+101	5	0	427	357	+70	2	3	411	380	+31

Last updated: November 16, 2020.
Source: Competitive matches

==== Regular season: Results by round ====
Round	1	2	3	4	5	6	7	8	9	10
Ground	A	H	H	A	H	H	A	A	H	A
Result	L	W	W	L	W	W	W	L	W	W
Position	4	3	2	3	3	3	2	3	2	2

Last updated: November 16, 2020.
Source: Competitive matches
Ground: A = Away; H = Home; R = Rest. Result: L = Loss; W = Win; R = Rest; P = Postponed.

Win Loss

==== Regular season: Matches ====
Note: All times are CET (UTC+1) as listed by EuroLeague. Some games were played behind closed doors (BCD) due to the COVID-19 pandemic in Europe.

30 September 2020 1	Nanterre 92 (France)	80–76	(Slovenia) Cedevita Olimpija	Nanterre
20:00	Scoring by quarter: 16–20, 18–16, 20–14, 26–26
	Pts: Cordinier 20; Rebs: Kaba 15; Asts: Cordinier, Warren 3 PIR: Cordinier 28	Boxscore	Pts: Perry 21; Rebs: Blažič 9 Asts: Hopkins 4 PIR: Blažič 23	Arena: Maurice Thorez; Attendance: 850; Referees: Carlos Peruga, Marcin Kowalski, Luka Kardum

9 November 2020 2	Cedevita Olimpija (Slovenia)	104–88	(Turkey) Frutti Extra Bursaspor	Bursa
18:30	Scoring by quarter: 27–26, 31–28, 27–22, 19–12
	Pts: Blažič 33; Rebs: Brown 8 Asts: Ukić, Perry 7 PIR: Blažič 39	Boxscore	Pts: Munford 25; Rebs: Batuk 8 Asts: Munford 7 PIR: Munford 31	Arena: Tofaş Nilüfer Salonu; Attendance: BCD; Referees: Miguel Ángel Pérez, Sérgio Silva, Artūras Šukys
Note: The game would have been played on 7 October. The Cedevita Olimpija entire roster had to remain in quarantine due to the requirement of the National Institute of Public Health of Slovenia after one of its players had tested positive for COVID-19. On 9 October, the Euroleague Basketball Disciplinary Judge has declared 20–0 win to Frutti Extra Bursaspor. Ten day late, Euroleague Basketball confirmed the modification of the Special Regulations and removed the 20-0 results for all games. Afterwards, the game was rescheduled to 9 November 2020. Due to having missed two games each so far due to the COVID-19 pandemic, Olimpija and Bursaspor made the rare agreement to play this Round 2 game, which was supposed to have been in Ljubljana, on the court of the visiting team. One result of that decision is that they will play again in 48 hours at the same arena, Tofaş Nilüfer Salonu, on Wednesday in their regularly scheduled Round 7 game in Group D.

13 October 2020 3	Cedevita Olimpija (Slovenia)	84–68	(Spain) Herbalife Gran Canaria	Ljubljana
18:30	Scoring by quarter: 20–20, 22–9, 19–15, 23–24
	Pts: Jones 18; Rebs: Hopkins 11; Asts: Murić 3 PIR: Jones 25	Boxscore	Pts: Wiley 15; Rebs: Wiley 9 Asts: Albicy 7 PIR: Wiley 21	Arena: Arena Stožice; Attendance: BCD; Referees: Ioannis Foufis, Saulius Racys, Denis Hadžić

20 October 2020 4	Dolomiti Energia Trento (Italy)	61–51	(Slovenia) Cedevita Olimpija	Trento
20:00	Scoring by quarter: 15–12, 15–10, 24–12, 7–17
	Pts: Browne 14; Rebs: Williams 10; Asts: Browne 7 PIR: Browne 20	Boxscore	Pts: Perry 13; Rebs: Jones 10; Asts: Perry 4 PIR: Blažič 17	Arena: BLM Group Arena; Attendance: BCD; Referees: Olegs Latisevs, Emilio Perez, Saulius Racys

10 December 2020 5	Cedevita Olimpija (Slovenia)	77–73	(Greece) Promitheas	Ljubljana
18:30	Scoring by quarter: 13–21, 19–20, 27–14, 18–18
	Pts: Perry 24; Rebs: Blažič, Murić 6 Asts: Blažič, Ukić 3 PIR: Blažič 23	Boxscore	Pts: Agbelese 17; Rebs: Mantzaris 10; Asts: Mantzaris 10; PIR: Mantzaris 25	Arena: Arena Stožice; Attendance: BCD; Referees: Joseph Bissang, Sérgio Silva, Rain Peerandi
Note: The game was originally scheduled to be played on 28 October. Promitheas requested the suspension of the game due to local legislation imposing quarantine measures on the team. Afterwards, the game was rescheduled to 10 December 2020.

4 November 2020 6	Cedevita Olimpija (Slovenia)	75–63	(France) Nanterre 92	Ljubljana
18:30	Scoring by quarter: 20–19, 20–9, 21–23, 14–12
	Pts: Brown 17; Rebs: Brown 11; Asts: Perry 10; PIR: Brown 28	Boxscore	Pts: Fevrier 23; Rebs: three players 3 Asts: Warren 3 PIR: Fevrier 15	Arena: Arena Stožice; Attendance: BCD; Referees: Carlos Cortés Rey, Miloš Koljenšić, Kristaps Konstantinovs

11 November 2020 7	Frutti Extra Bursaspor (Turkey)	80–97	(Slovenia) Cedevita Olimpija	Bursa
18:00	Scoring by quarter: 21–33, 22–19, 23–27, 14–18
	Pts: Jones 23; Rebs: Hamilton, Savaş 4 Asts: İlyasoğlu 11; PIR: Jones 20	Boxscore	Pts: Blažič 25; Rebs: Hopkins 8 Asts: Perry 9 PIR: Blažič 32	Arena: Tofaş Nilüfer Salonu; Attendance: BCD; Referees: Luigi Lamonica, Robert Vyklický, Gentian Cici

18 November 2020 8	Herbalife Gran Canaria (Spain)	90–82	(Slovenia) Cedevita Olimpija	Las Palmas
21:00	Scoring by quarter: 16–16, 25–24, 27–24, 22–18
	Pts: Costello 16; Rebs: three players 8 Asts: Ferrari 10; PIR: Costello 27	Boxscore	Pts: Perry 25; Rebs: Hopkins 10; Asts: Perry 7 PIR: Perry 32	Arena: Palacio Multiusos de Gran Canaria; Attendance: BCD; Referees: Spiros Gkontas, Anne Panther, Artūras Šukys

8 December 2020 9	Cedevita Olimpija (Slovenia)	87–65	(Italy) Dolomiti Energia Trento	Ljubljana
18:00	Scoring by quarter: 20–21, 24–14, 26–9, 17–21
	Pts: Blažič 15; Rebs: Jones 8 Asts: Perry 7 PIR: Perry 19	Boxscore	Pts: Williams 20; Rebs: Williams 9 Asts: Martin, Browne 3 PIR: Williams 22	Arena: Arena Stožice; Attendance: BCD; Referees: Jordi Aliaga, Vasiliki Tsaroucha, Kristaps Konstantinovs

16 December 2020 10	Promitheas (Greece)	69–105	(Slovenia) Cedevita Olimpija	Patras
17:30	Scoring by quarter: 23–27, 13–20, 17–37, 16–21
	Pts: Tanoulis 12; Rebs: Mantzoukas 6 Asts: Radičević 5 PIR: Mantzoukas 10	Boxscore	Pts: Blažič 18; Rebs: Marinković 9 Asts: Rupnik 7 PIR: Hopkins 25	Arena: Dimitris Tofalos Arena; Attendance: BCD; Referees: Milivoje Jovčić, Jakub Zamojski, Artem Lavrukhin

==== Top 16: Standings ====
Pos	Team	Pld	W	L	PF	PA	PD	Qualification
1	(Italy) Virtus Segafredo Bologna	6	6	0	549	470	+79	Advance to quarterfinals
2	(Montenegro) Budućnost VOLI	6	3	3	504	495	+9	Advance to quarterfinals
3	(Slovenia) Cedevita Olimpija	6	3	3	478	486	−8	
4	(France) JL Bourg	6	0	6	473	553	−80	

Source: EuroCup Basketball
Rules for classification: All points scored in extra period(s) were not counted in the standings, nor for any tie-break situation.

==== Top 16: Results summary ====
Overall						Home					Away				
Pld	W	L	PF	PA	PD	W	L	PF	PA	PD	W	L	PF	PA	PD
6	3	3	478	486	−8	2	1	259	253	+6	1	2	219	233	−14

Last updated: March 10, 2021.
Source: Competitive matches

==== Top 16: Results by round ====
Round	1	2	3	4	5	6
Ground	A	H	H	A	H	A
Result	L	W	W	W	L	L
Position	3	3	2	2	2	3

Last updated: March 10, 2021.
Source: Competitive matches
Ground: A = Away; H = Home; R = Rest. Result: L = Loss; W = Win; R = Rest; P = Postponed.

Win Loss

==== Top 16: Matches ====
Note: All times are CET (UTC+1) as listed by EuroLeague. Some games were played behind closed doors (BCD) due to the COVID-19 pandemic in Europe.

13 January 2021 1	Segafredo Virtus Bologna (Italy)	90–76	(Slovenia) Cedevita Olimpija	Bologna
18:30	Scoring by quarter: 11–18, 35–16, 14–15, 30–27
	Pts: Belinelli 25; Rebs: Hunter 9 Asts: Teodosić 8 PIR: Belinelli, Hunter 29	Boxscore	Pts: Blažič 25; Rebs: Hopkins 5 Asts: Perry 5 PIR: Perry 28	Arena: Segafredo Arena; Referees: Emilio Pérez, Miloš Koljenšić, Rain Peerandi

19 January 2021 2	Cedevita Olimpija (Slovenia)	74–71	(Montenegro) Budućnost VOLI	Ljubljana
20:30	Scoring by quarter: 14–16, 19–18, 20–21, 21–16
	Pts: Perry, Murić 16; Rebs: Hopkins 9 Asts: Perry 10; PIR: Perry 24	Boxscore	Pts: Della Valle, Reed 11; Rebs: Reed 6 Asts: Cobbs 5 PIR: Mitrović 21	Arena: Arena Stožice; Referees: Joseph Bissang, Mykola Ambrosov, Gentian Cici

27 January 2021 3	Cedevita Olimpija (Slovenia)	94–91	(France) JL Bourg	Ljubljana
20:30	Scoring by quarter: 24–21, 31–30, 15–20, 24–20
	Pts: Blažič 30; Rebs: Blažič, Hopkins 8 Asts: Perry 8 PIR: Blažič 41	Boxscore	Pts: Anđušić 25; Rebs: Courby 7 Asts: Ašćerić 6 PIR: Anđušić 27	Arena: Arena Stožice; Referees: Jordi Aliaga, Nick Van den Broeck, Artūras Šukys

3 February 2021 4	JL Bourg (France)	64–77	(Slovenia) Cedevita Olimpija	Bourg-en-Bresse
21:00	Scoring by quarter: 21–28, 20–11, 14–20, 9–18
	Pts: Ašćerić, Courby 11; Rebs: Pelos 6 Asts: Ašćerić 5 PIR: Ašćerić 15	Boxscore	Pts: Blažič, Brown 15; Rebs: Murić 6 Asts: Perry 4 PIR: Brown 17	Arena: Ekinox; Referees: Miguel Ángel Pérez, Sérgio Silva, Denis Hadžić

2 March 2021 5	Cedevita Olimpija (Slovenia)	98–108(OT)	(Italy) Segafredo Virtus Bologna	Ljubljana
20:30	Scoring by quarter: 22–23, 18–16, 22–17, 29–35, Overtime: 7–17
	Pts: Blažič 29; Rebs: four players 5 Asts: Perry 9 PIR: Blažič 27	Boxscore	Pts: Weems 25; Rebs: Hunter 10; Asts: Teodosić 12; PIR: Hunter 28	Arena: Arena Stožice; Referees: Piotr Pastusiak, Jurgis Laurinavičius, Benjamin Barth

9 March 2021 6	Budućnost VOLI (Montenegro)	79–66	(Slovenia) Cedevita Olimpija	Podgorica
19:00	Scoring by quarter: 17–19, 21–21, 20–17, 21–9
	Pts: Ejim 20; Rebs: D. Nikolić 10; Asts: Cobbs 6 PIR: Ejim 23	Boxscore	Pts: Blažič 18; Rebs: Hopkins 7 Asts: Perry 5 PIR: Jones 16	Arena: Morača Sports Center; Referees: Joseph Bissang, Ingus Baumanis, Mykola Ambrosov

=== Adriatic Supercup ===
The 2020 ABA Super Cup was scheduled to be the fourth tournament of the ABA Super Cup. On 29 June 2020, the ABA League Assembly cancelled the tournament due to the COVID-19 pandemic.

It would have been played between 20 and 23 September 2020 in Podgorica, Montenegro.

=== Slovenian Cup ===
The 2021 Slovenian Cup will be the 30th season of the national cup tournament. The club will join the tournament in the quarterfinals.

Win Loss

All times are local UTC+1.

11 May 2021 Quarterfinal	Cedevita Olimpija	103–55	Terme Olimia Podčetrtek	Ljubljana
19:30
		Boxscore		Arena: Arena Stožice

22 May 2021 Semifinal	Krka	82–80	Cedevita Olimpija	Ljubljana
20:30
Sport Klub		Boxscore		Arena: Kodeljevo Hall

=== Slovenian Supercup ===
The 2020 Slovenian Supercup was the 17th season of the Supercup tournament. It was the club's first appearance in the Supercup.

On 7 September 2020, the Basketball Federation of Slovenia announced that Krka would play in the Supercup, following the withdrawal of Koper Primorska due to roster problems. The game was played behind closed doors due to the COVID-19 pandemic in Slovenia.

Win Loss

17 September 2020 Final	Krka	67–78	Cedevita Olimpija	Kranj
20:00	Scoring by quarter: 15–22, 15–19, 22–17, 15–20
	Pts: Stipčević 19; Rebs: Barič 5 Asts: Vrabac 4 PIR: Vučetić 13	Boxscore	Pts: Perry 20; Rebs: Murić 8 Asts: Perry 5 PIR: Perry 26	Arena: Planina Sports Hall; Attendance: BCD; Referees: Boris Krejić, Milan Nedović, Primož Pipan

== Individual awards ==
=== EuroCup ===
MVP of the Week

Top 16
Week	Player	PIR	Ref.
3	(Slovenia) Jaka Blažič	41	

=== Adriatic League ===
MVP of the Round

Round	Player	Eff.	Ref.
5	(Slovenia) Jaka Blažič	31	
7	(Slovenia) Jaka Blažič (2)	29	
14	(United States) Mikael Hopkins	39	
26	(Slovenia) Jaka Blažič (3)	38	

MVP of the Month

Month	Player	Ref.
2020
November	(Slovenia) Jaka Blažič	
2021
January	(Slovenia) Jaka Blažič (2)	

== Statistics ==
Legend
GP	Games played	GS	Games started	MPG	Minutes per game
FG%	Field-goal percentage	3FG%	3-point field-goal percentage	FT%	Free-throw percentage
RPG	Rebounds per game	APG	Assists per game	SPG	Steals per game
BPG	Blocks per game	PPG	Points per game	PIR	PIR per game

Player	Left during the season

=== EuroCup ===
Player	GP	GS	MPG	2FG%	3FG%	FT%	RPG	APG	SPG	BPG	PPG	PIR
Jaka Blažič	16	16	31:18	.492	.466	.744	4.9	2.3	0.9	0.0	19.1	19.5
Rion Brown	15	7	26:07	.510	.345	.765	4.0	1.1	1.1	0.1	8.2	8.5
Žiga Dimec	8	2	8:49	.471	—	.429	2.6	0.4	0.1	0.1	2.4	2.6
Dan Duščak	3	0	3:56	.000	.000	.500	0.7	0.0	0.3	0.0	0.7	-0.3
Alen Hodžić	14	2	13:35	.538	.278	—	1.6	0.4	0.4	0.0	3.1	1.4
Mikael Hopkins	16	13	24:02	.587	.111	.762	6.6	0.9	0.8	0.4	8.1	10.1
Jarrod Jones	15	7	24:36	.473	.342	.759	4.6	0.5	0.7	0.3	9.9	8.9
Ivan Marinković	11	4	17:03	.543	—	.250	3.3	0.4	0.6	1.4	4.7	3.6
Mangok Mathiang	Did not play											
Edo Murić	16	12	25:59	.592	.384	.571	4.1	0.9	0.8	0.2	9.4	8.8
Kendrick Perry	16	16	27:52	.583	.357	.738	3.1	6.1	1.4	0.1	16.1	19.2
Rok Radović	6	1	5:37	.250	.000	.333	1.7	0.5	0.0	0.2	1.0	0.8
Luka Rupnik	8	0	12:11	.333	.417	.800	1.3	2.1	0.9	0.0	5.5	5.4
Luka Ščuka	1	0	7:38	1.00	—	1.00	2.0	0.0	0.0	0.0	5.0	6.0
Roko Ukić	8	0	14:42	.500	.227	.889	1.0	2.4	0.3	0.1	4.4	5.1

Source: EuroCup

=== Slovenian Supercup ===
Player	GP	GS	MPG	2FG%	3FG%	FT%	RPG	APG	SPG	BPG	PPG	PIR
Jaka Blažič	1	1	28:04	.750	.250	.420	5.0	0.0	2.0	0.0	18.0	11.0
Rion Brown	1	0	6:22	.666	.400	1.000	6.0	1.0	2.0	0.0	12.0	16.0
Žiga Dimec	1	0	09:17	—	—	.500	1.0	1.0	0.0	0.0	1.0	1.0
Dan Duščak	Did not play											
Matic Gorenjc	Did not play											
Alen Hodžić	1	0	15:46	1.000	.000	1.000	1.0	1.0	0.0	0.0	6.0	6.0
Mikael Hopkins	1	1	25:19	.500	.000	.000	4.0	1.0	0.0	1.0	6.0	5.0
Ivan Marinković	1	1	23:42	.500	—	.000	4.0	2.0	1.0	0.0	4.0	7.0
Mangok Mathiang	Not added to the roster											
Edo Murić	1	1	30:42	.290	.250	1.000	8.0	2.0	1.0	0.0	9.0	11.0
Kendrick Perry	1	1	27:45	.710	.200	.780	7.0	5.0	2.0	0.0	20.0	26.0
Rok Radović	Did not play											
Roko Ukić	1	0	13:03	.000	—	1.000	0.0	0.0	0.0	1.0	2.0	-2.0

Source: KZS
