= 2020–21 ABA League First Division =

ABA League First Division
- Season: 2020–21
- Duration: October 2, 2020 – April 27, 2021 (Regular season)
- Games played: 24 each (Note: Additionally, each team was awarded with two 20–0 wins over Koper Primorska following their ejection.)
- Teams: 14 (Note: There is 13 teams in the competition as of December 2020 due to ejection of Koper Primorska.)
- TV partners: Arena Sport, B92

Regular season
- Top seed: (Serbia) Crvena zvezda mts
- Season MVP: (Serbia) Filip Petrušev
- Promoted: (Montenegro) Studentski centar
- Relegated: (Slovenia) Koper Primorska (disqualified)

Finals
- Champions: (Serbia) Crvena zvezda mts (5th title)
- Runners-up: (Montenegro) Budućnost VOLI
- Semi-finalists: (Montenegro) Mornar (Bosnia and Herzegovina) Igokea
- Finals MVP: (Cameroon) Landry Nnoko

Awards
- Top Prospect: (Serbia) Filip Petrušev

Statistical leaders
Points	(Serbia) Filip Petrušev	23.71
Rebounds	(Montenegro) Marko Simonović	8.96
Assists	(Serbia) Filip Čović	6.70
Index Rating	(Serbia) Filip Petrušev	27.95

Records
- Biggest home win: Mornar 109–68 Cibona (12 October 2020)
- Biggest away win: Krka 57–98 Crvena zvezda mts (20 April 2021)
- Highest scoring: Partizan NIS 99–101 Budućnost VOLI (10 October 2020)
- Winning streak: 9 games Crvena zvezda mts
- Losing streak: 26 games (Note: Koper Primorska lost its first nine matches. They have not appeared in rounds 10 and 11. Due to unjustified non-appearance in two consecutive games the club was disqualified from the further competition and forfeited 0–20 for all 26 matches (before and following ejection).); Koper Primorska
- All statistics correct as of May 28, 2021.

The 2020–21 ABA League First Division was the 20th season of the ABA League with 14 teams from Bosnia and Herzegovina, Croatia, Montenegro, Serbia and Slovenia participating in it. The season has started on 2 October 2020.

The season is the first to be played after the previous season was abandoned due to the COVID-19 pandemic. The ABA League Assembly ruled that the 12 teams from the previous season stays in the league and the first two clubs from Second Division were awarded two wild cards.

The Slovenian club Koper Primorska was disqualified from the competition in December 2020 and forfeited 0–20 for all games. Defending champions Crvena zvezda mts won its fifth title following a 3–2 win over Budućnost VOLI in the 2021 Finals.

== Teams ==
=== Promotion and relegation ===
A total of 14 teams will contest the league, including all 12 sides from the previous season and two clubs with wild cards from the 2019–20 Second Division season. Two wild cards were awarded to Borac Čačak and Split, two highest-placed teams.

=== In season disqualification ===
The Slovenian club Koper Primorska was disqualified from the competition on 17 December 2020. Following this disqualification the league remain with 13 clubs for the rest of season.

Disqualified

=== Venues and locations ===
Location of teams in the 2020–21 season
Locations of the teams from Belgrade in the 2020–21 season

Team	Home city	Arena	Capacity
(Serbia) Borac Čačak	Čačak	Borac Hall	4,000
(Montenegro) Budućnost VOLI	Podgorica	Morača Sports Center	6,000
(Slovenia) Cedevita Olimpija	Ljubljana	Arena Stožice	12,480
(Croatia) Cibona	Zagreb	Dražen Petrović Hall	5,400
(Serbia) Crvena zvezda mts	Belgrade	Aleksandar Nikolić Hall	8,000
(Serbia) FMP	Belgrade	Železnik Hall	3,000
(Bosnia and Herzegovina) Igokea	Aleksandrovac	Laktaši Sports Hall	3,050
(Slovenia) Koper Primorska	Koper	Arena Bonifika	3,000
(Slovenia) Krka	Novo Mesto	Leon Štukelj Hall	2,500
(Serbia) Mega Soccerbet	Belgrade	Ranko Žeravica Sports Hall	5,000
(Montenegro) Mornar	Bar	Topolica Sport Hall	2,625
(Serbia) Partizan NIS	Belgrade	Štark Arena	18,386
(Croatia) Split	Split	Arena Gripe	3,500
(Croatia) Zadar	Zadar	Krešimir Ćosić Hall	7,997

=== Personnel and sponsorship ===
Team	Head coach	Captain	Kit manufacturer	Shirt sponsor
Borac Čačak	(Serbia) Marko Marinović	(Serbia) Uroš Čarapić	—	P.S. Fashion
Budućnost VOLI	(Serbia) Dejan Milojević	(Montenegro) Suad Šehović	Spalding	VOLI
Cedevita Olimpija	(Slovenia) Jurica Golemac	(Slovenia) Jaka Blažič	Adidas	Cedevita
Cibona	(Serbia) Vladimir Jovanović	(Croatia) Roko Prkačin	GBT	Erste Bank
Crvena zvezda mts	(Montenegro) Dejan Radonjić	(Serbia) Branko Lazić	Adidas	mts
FMP	(Serbia) Vanja Guša	(Serbia) Radoš Šešlija	Adidas	FMP
Igokea	(Bosnia and Herzegovina) Dragan Bajić	(Serbia) Marko Jošilo	GBT	m:tel
Koper Primorska	(Slovenia) Andrej Žakelj	(Slovenia) Luka Vončina	Erreà	Vehicle rent
Krka	(Slovenia) Dalibor Damjanović	(Slovenia) Luka Lapornik	—	Krka
Mega Soccerbet	(Serbia) Vlada Jovanović	(Serbia) Milenko Tepić	Adidas	Soccerbet / Tehnomanija
Mornar	(Montenegro) Mihailo Pavićević	(Montenegro) Marko Mijović	DaCapo	Bar Municipality / Barsko zlato
Partizan NIS	(Serbia) Aleksandar Matović	(Serbia) Novica Veličković	Under Armour	NIS / mts
Split	(Croatia) Mile Karakaš	(Croatia) Mateo Kedžo	Macron	Jugoplastika
Zadar	(Croatia) Veljko Mršić	(Croatia) Dominik Mavra	Macron	OTP Bank

=== Coaching changes ===
Team	Outgoing manager	Date of vacancy	Position in table	Replaced with	Date of appointment	Ref.
Mega Soccerbet	(Serbia) Dejan Milojević	1 June 2020	Off-season	(Serbia) Vlada Jovanović	1 June 2020	
Crvena zvezda mts	(Serbia) Dragan Šakota	8 June 2020	Off-season	(Serbia) Saša Obradović	10 June 2020	
Zadar	(Croatia) Danijel Jusup	24 June 2020	Off-season	(Croatia) Veljko Mršić	25 June 2020	
Partizan NIS	(Italy) Andrea Trinchieri	2 July 2020	Off-season	(Montenegro) Vlado Šćepanović	9 July 2020	
Partizan NIS	(Montenegro) Vlado Šćepanović	30 October 2020	6th (2–2)	(Serbia) Milivoje Lazić (interim)	30 October 2020	
Partizan NIS	(Serbia) Milivoje Lazić (interim)	5 November 2020	7th (2–3)	(Slovenia) Sašo Filipovski	5 November 2020	
FMP	(Serbia) Vladimir Jovanović	14 December 2020	12th (2–6)	(Serbia) Bojan Đerić (interim)	14 December 2020	
Crvena zvezda mts	(Serbia) Saša Obradović	24 December 2020	1st (9–1)	(Montenegro) Dejan Radonjić	25 December 2020	
Budućnost VOLI	(Montenegro) Petar Mijović	27 January 2021	5th (11–3)	(Serbia) Dejan Milojević	28 January 2021	
Cibona	(Bosnia and Herzegovina) Ivan Velić	31 January 2021	11th (5–10)	(Serbia) Vladimir Jovanović	2 February 2021	
FMP	(Serbia) Bojan Đerić (interim)	13 February 2021	11th (5–10)	(Serbia) Vanja Guša	13 February 2021	
Split	(Croatia) Ivica Skelin	17 February 2021	8th (5–13)	(Croatia) Mile Karakaš	21 February 2021	
Partizan NIS	(Slovenia) Sašo Filipovski	9 March 2021	7th (7–12)	(Serbia) Aleksandar Matović	9 March 2021	
Krka	(Croatia) Vladimir Anzulović	17 March 2021	11th (6–14)	(Slovenia) Dalibor Damjanović	17 March 2021	

== Regular season ==
The regular season began on 2 October 2020.

On 17 December 2020, the Slovenian club Koper Primorska was disqualified from the competition after failing to play two consecutive games due to financial problems. All of the Koper Primorska results were registered with the scores of 20–0 for their opponents and were not awarded a point for the defeat.

=== League table ===
Pos	Team	Pld	W	L	PF	PA	PD	Pts	Qualification or relegation
1	(Serbia) Crvena zvezda mts	26	23	3	2064	1694	+370	49	Advance to the playoffs
2	(Montenegro) Budućnost VOLI	26	22	4	2056	1811	+245	48	Advance to the playoffs
3	(Montenegro) Mornar	26	19	7	2066	1890	+176	45	Advance to the playoffs
4	(Bosnia and Herzegovina) Igokea	26	19	7	1973	1846	+127	45	Advance to the playoffs
5	(Slovenia) Cedevita Olimpija	26	18	8	2116	1947	+169	44	
6	(Serbia) Mega Soccerbet	26	14	12	1996	1955	+41	40	
7	(Serbia) Partizan NIS	26	13	13	2003	1903	+100	39	
8	(Serbia) FMP	26	11	15	2049	2135	−86	37	
9	(Croatia) Cibona	26	10	16	1897	1998	−101	36	
10	(Croatia) Zadar	26	9	17	1804	1923	−119	35	
11	(Serbia) Borac Čačak	26	8	18	1919	1978	−59	34	
12	(Slovenia) Krka	26	8	18	1748	1938	−190	34	
13	(Croatia) Split	26	8	18	1816	1969	−153	34	Qualification to the relegation playoffs
14	(Slovenia) Koper Primorska	26	0	26	0	520	−520	0	Disqualified

Source: ABA League

=== Positions by round ===
The Slovenaian club Koper Primorska was disqualified from the competition on 17 December 2020.

First place & advance to the playoffs	Advance to the playoffs	Qualification to the relegation playoffs	Disqualified

Team ╲ Round	1	2	3	4	5	6	7	8	9	10	11	12	13	14	15	16	17	18	19	20	21	22	23	24	25	26
(Serbia) Crvena zvezda mts	1	1	1	1	1	1	1	1	1	1	1	2	2	4	4	6	6	6	5	5	4	3	2	3	3	1
(Montenegro) Budućnost VOLI	2	4	3	2	3	7	9	7	5	6	7	6	6	6	5	5	5	5	6	6	6	4	4	4	1	2
(Montenegro) Mornar	5	2	5	7	6	3	3	3	3	3	3	3	1	1	1	1	1	2	1	1	1	1	3	2	4	3
(Bosnia and Herzegovina) Igokea	11	8	6	5	2	5	7	8	6	4	4	4	4	3	3	2	2	1	2	2	2	2	1	1	2	4
(Slovenia) Cedevita Olimpija	7	3	2	3	5	9	6	5	10	8	10	9	7	7	7	4	4	4	4	3	5	5	6	6	5	5
(Serbia) Mega Soccerbet	3	5	4	4	4	2	2	2	2	2	2	1	3	2	2	3	3	3	3	4	3	6	5	5	6	6
(Serbia) Partizan NIS	9	11	7	6	7	4	4	4	4	5	5	5	5	5	6	7	7	7	7	7	7	7	7	7	7	7
(Serbia) FMP	4	6	9	9	8	10	11	12	12	12	11	12	10	10	9	10	10	11	13	11	9	9	8	8	8	8
(Croatia) Cibona	13	13	13	12	9	8	8	9	8	10	9	10	12	12	12	12	11	9	9	9	10	10	12	12	11	9
(Croatia) Zadar	10	12	12	8	11	11	12	13	13	13	13	13	13	13	13	13	13	12	11	12	12	12	9	10	9	10
(Serbia) Borac Čačak	6	9	10	13	13	13	13	11	11	11	12	11	11	11	11	11	12	13	12	13	13	13	11	9	10	11
(Slovenia) Krka	8	10	8	10	12	12	10	10	7	7	6	7	8	9	10	9	9	10	10	10	11	11	13	13	13	12
(Croatia) Split	12	7	11	11	10	6	5	6	9	9	8	8	9	8	8	8	8	8	8	8	8	8	10	11	12	13
(Slovenia) Koper Primorska	14	14	14	14	14	14	14	14	14	14	14	14	14	14	14	14	14	14	14	14	14	14	14	14	14	14

Source: ABA League

=== Results ===
The Slovenaian club Koper Primorska was disqualified from the competition on 17 December 2020 and forfeited 0–20 for all matches before and following ejection. The club played nine games before ejection. They have not appeared in rounds 10 and 11. The club was disqualified from the further competition due to unjustified non-appearance in two consecutive games.

Home \ Away	BOR	BUD	COL	CIB	CZV	FMP	IGO	KRK	MEG	MOR	PAR	PRI	SPL	ZAD
Borac Čačak	—	72–76	82–95	77–82	64–95	83–76	78–101	86–90	83–97	76–87	75–71	20–0 (Note: Koper Primoprska was forfeited 0–20 due to unjustified non-appearance.)	90–69	61–65
Budućnost VOLI	86–83	—	89–75	87–68	83–63	77–76	92–64	70–62	92–79	81–74	80–72	20–0 (Note: As of Round 12, Koper Primorska has been forfeited 0–20 as the disqualified club.)	84–59	98–75
Cedevita Olimpija	97–88	95–84	—	100–75	72–89	94–86	103–92	77–69	85–79	88–93	78–65	20–0	94–66	77–56
Cibona	69–64	72–76	93–83	—	66–104	93–80	80–88	78–69	73–77	78–92	75–82	20–0 (Note: Cibona won 91–50. The result was overturned 20–0 for Cibona, following the Koper Primoprska disqualification.)	74–76	77–75
Crvena zvezda mts	83–63	65–67	82–81	85–63	—	101–71	69–66	88–62	92–85	93–62	73–64	20–0	78–76	81–66
FMP	93–87	88–99	91–88	90–86	75–111	—	82–87	91–85	91–92	94–92	90–103	20–0 (Note: FMP won 84–65. The result was overturned 20–0 for FMP, following the Koper Primoprska disqualification.)	96–92	89–99
Igokea	73–71	82–87	76–70	88–80	85–65	84–74	—	77–64	62–84	79–88	90–84	20–0 (Note: Igokea won 89–71. The result was overturned 20–0 for Igokea, following the Koper Primoprska disqualification.)	87–68	72–48
Krka	74–94	70–90	88–95	63–80	57–98	76–97	69–70	—	76–71	74–84	69–50	20–0 (Note: Krka won 74–57. The result was overturned 20–0 for Krka, following the Koper Primoprska disqualification.)	77–71	63–81
Mega Soccerbet	86–84	78–72	88–93	72–71	73–76	76–84	84–86	71–70	—	90–89	88–98	20–0	91–75	90–87
Mornar	86–72	100–92	71–81	109–68	78–86	84–74	90–76	80–61	80–73	—	77–76	20–0 (Note: Mornar won 87–66. The result was overturned 20–0 for Mornar, following the Koper Primoprska disqualification.)	81–71	77–71
Partizan NIS	78–87	99–101	86–77	87–90	85–86	97–74	75–83	91–67	79–77	83–75	—	20–0	80–58	78–63
Koper Primorska	0–20	0–20	0–20 (Note: Cedevita Olimpija won 102–65. The result was overturned 20–0 for Cedevita Olimpija, following Koper Primoprska disqualification.)	0–20	0–20 (Note: Crvena zvezda won 84–72. The result was overturned 20–0 for Crvena zvezda, following the Koper Primoprska disqualification.)	0–20	0–20	0–20	0–20 (Note: Mega Soccerbet won 71–69. The result was overturned 20–0 for Mega Soccerbet, following the Koper Primoprska disqualification.)	0–20	0–20	—	0–20	0–20 (Note: Zadar won 77–55. The result was overturned 20–0 for Zadar, following the Koper Primoprska disqualification.)
Split	74–86	78–77	81–98	77–74	60–71	86–71	78–79	78–80	74–65	87–95	74–86	20–0	—	76–89
Zadar	75–73	62–76	78–80	97–92	70–90	63–76	63–86	70–73	83–90	66–82	96–94	20–0	66–72	—

Source: ABA League
Legend: Blue = home team win; Red = away team win.
Matches with lighter background shading were decided after overtime.

=== Results by round ===
The table lists the results of teams in each round. The Slovenaian club Koper Primorska was disqualified from the competition on 17 December 2020 and forfeited 0–20 for all matches before and following ejection.

Win	Loss	Postponed

Team ╲ Round	1	2	3	4	5	6	7	8	9	10	11	12	13	14	15	16	17	18	19	20	21	22	23	24	25	26
(Serbia) Crvena zvezda mts	W	W	W	W	W	W	W	W	L	W	W	L	W	W	W	W	W	W	W	W	W	L	W	W	W	W
(Montenegro) Budućnost VOLI	W	W	W	W	L	W	W	W	W	W	L	W	W	L	W	W	W	W	W	W	W	W	L	W	W	W
(Montenegro) Mornar	W	W	L	W	W	W	W	W	W	L	W	W	W	W	W	L	W	L	W	W	W	L	W	L	L	W
(Bosnia and Herzegovina) Igokea	L	W	W	W	W	L	W	L	W	W	W	W	L	W	W	W	W	W	L	W	W	W	W	W	L	L
(Slovenia) Cedevita Olimpija	W	W	W	L	W	L	W	W	W	W	L	L	W	W	W	W	W	L	W	W	L	W	L	L	W	W
(Serbia) Mega Soccerbet	W	W	W	L	L	W	W	W	W	L	W	W	L	L	W	W	L	W	W	L	W	L	L	L	L	L
(Serbia) Partizan NIS	L	L	W	W	L	W	W	L	L	W	L	W	W	L	L	W	L	L	L	L	L	W	W	W	W	W
(Serbia) FMP	W	L	L	L	W	W	L	L	L	L	L	L	W	W	W	L	L	L	L	L	W	W	L	W	W	W
(Croatia) Cibona	L	L	L	W	W	L	L	L	W	L	L	L	W	L	L	L	W	W	L	W	L	L	W	L	W	W
(Croatia) Zadar	L	L	L	W	L	L	L	W	L	L	W	W	L	L	L	W	W	W	W	L	L	L	L	W	L	L
(Serbia) Borac Čačak	W	L	L	L	L	L	L	L	L	W	L	W	L	W	L	L	L	W	L	L	W	L	W	L	W	L
(Slovenia) Krka	L	L	W	L	L	L	L	W	W	W	W	L	L	L	L	L	L	L	L	W	L	W	W	L	L	L
(Croatia) Split	L	W	L	W	W	W	L	L	L	L	W	L	L	W	L	L	L	L	W	L	L	W	L	W	L	L
(Slovenia) Koper Primorska	L	L	L	L	L	L	L	L	L	L	L	L	L	L	L	L	L	L	L	L	L	L	L	L	L	L

Source: ABA League

== Playoffs ==
The semi-finals will be played in a best-of-three format, while the Finals were played in a best-of-five format.

Semifinals
1 (Serbia) Crvena zvezda mts	2
4 (Bosnia and Herzegovina) Igokea	1
2 (Montenegro) Budućnost VOLI	2
3 (Montenegro) Mornar	0

Finals
1 (Serbia) Crvena zvezda mts	3
2 (Montenegro) Budućnost VOLI	2

2020–21 ABA League Champions
(Serbia)
Crvena zvezda mts
5th title

=== Semifinals ===
Team 1	Series	Team 2	Game 1	Game 2	Game 3
Crvena zvezda mts (Serbia)	2–1	(Bosnia and Herzegovina) Igokea	76–61	68–81	76–53
Budućnost VOLI (Montenegro)	2–0	(Montenegro) Mornar	97–88	92–81	—

=== Finals ===
Team 1	Series	Team 2	Game 1	Game 2	Game 3	Game 4	Game 5
Crvena zvezda mts (Serbia)	3–2	(Montenegro) Budućnost VOLI	82–78	85–79	71–75	80–81	67–60

== Relegation playoffs ==
The 13th placed team of the First Division season and the runners-up of the Second Division season will play in the Qualifiers for a spot in the next First Division season.

Qualified clubs
Leagues	Clubs
First Division	(Croatia) Split
Second Division	(Bosnia and Herzegovina) Spars

=== Results ===
Team 1	Series	Team 2	Game 1	Game 2	Game 3
Split (Croatia)	2–1	(Bosnia and Herzegovina) Spars	70–76	84–64	90–60

== Statistical leaders ==
As of 28 May 2021

All players statistics from the nine games with Koper Primorska were annulled following their disqualification from the competition.

=== PIR ===
Pos	Player	Club	PIR
1	(Serbia) Filip Petrušev	Mega Soccerbet	27.95
2	(Montenegro) Marko Simonović	Mega Soccerbet	19.17
3	(Montenegro) Justin Cobbs	Budućnost VOLI	18.90
4	(Serbia) Nemanja Nenadić	FMP	18.59
5	(Slovenia) Jaka Blažič	Cedevita Olimpija	18.52

=== Points ===
Pos	Player	Club	PPG
1	(Serbia) Filip Petrušev	Mega Soccerbet	23.71
2	(Slovenia) Jaka Blažič	Cedevita Olimpija	17.22
3	(Serbia) Nemanja Nenadić	FMP	17.05
4	(Georgia (country)) Jacob Pullen	Mornar Bar	16.63
5	(United States) Jordan Loyd	Crvena zvezda mts	16.00

=== Rebounds ===
Pos	Player	Club	RPG
1	(Montenegro) Marko Simonović	Mega Soccerbet	8.96
2	(Serbia) Filip Petrušev	Mega Soccerbet	7.62
3	(United States) Rashawn Thomas	Partizan NIS	7.17
4	(Croatia) Roko Prkačin	Cibona	6.78
5	(United States) Chinanu Onuaku	Zadar	6.52

=== Assists ===
Pos	Player	Club	APG
1	(Serbia) Filip Čović	FMP	6.70
2	(United States) Scoochie Smith	Mega Soccerbet	5.71
3	(Serbia) Jovan Novak	Mega Soccerbet	5.50
4	(Montenegro) Nikola Ivanović	Budućnost VOLI	4.94
5	(Montenegro) Derek Needham	Mornar Bar	4.68

Source: ABA League

== Awards ==
Pos.	Player	Team	Ref.
MVP
F/C	(Serbia) Filip Petrušev	(Serbia) Mega Soccerbet	
Finals MVP
C	(Cameroon) Landry Nnoko	(Serbia) Crvena zvezda mts	
Top Scorer
F/C	(Serbia) Filip Petrušev	(Serbia) Mega Soccerbet	
Best Defensive Player
G/F	(Serbia) Branko Lazić	(Serbia) Crvena zvezda mts	
Top Prospect
F/C	(Serbia) Filip Petrušev	(Serbia) Mega Soccerbet	
Coach of the Season
HC	(Bosnia and Herzegovina) Dragan Bajić	(Bosnia and Herzegovina) Igokea	
The Ideal Starting Five
PG	(United States) Jordan Loyd	(Serbia) Crvena zvezda mts	
SG	(Montenegro) Nikola Ivanović	(Montenegro) Budućnost VOLI	
SF	(Slovenia) Jaka Blažič	(Slovenia) Cedevita Olimpija	
PF	(Montenegro) Marko Simonović	(Serbia) Mega Soccerbet	
C	(Serbia) Filip Petrušev	(Serbia) Mega Soccerbet	

== MVP List ==
=== MVP of the Round ===
Round	Player	Team	PIR
1	(Montenegro) Marko Simonović	(Serbia) Mega Soccerbet	33
2	(Montenegro) Justin Cobbs	(Montenegro) Budućnost VOLI	30
3	(Montenegro) Nikola Ivanović	(Montenegro) Budućnost VOLI	32
4	(United States) Jordan Loyd	(Serbia) Crvena zvezda mts	22
5	(Slovenia) Jaka Blažič	(Slovenia) Cedevita Olimpija	31
6	(Serbia) Marko Radovanović	(Serbia) FMP	39
7	(Slovenia) Jaka Blažič (2)	(Slovenia) Cedevita Olimpija	29
8	(Georgia (country)) Jacob Pullen	(Montenegro) Mornar	38
9	(Serbia) Filip Petrušev	(Serbia) Mega Soccerbet	37
10	(Serbia) Ognjen Dobrić	(Serbia) Crvena zvezda mts	25
11	(Serbia) Filip Petrušev (2)	(Serbia) Mega Soccerbet	36
12	(Croatia) Dominik Mavra	(Croatia) Zadar	47
13	(Serbia) Ognjen Jaramaz	(Serbia) Partizan NIS	33
14	(United States) Mikael Hopkins	(Slovenia) Cedevita Olimpija	39
15	(Serbia) Filip Petrušev (3)	(Serbia) Mega Soccerbet	41
16	(United States) Chinanu Onuaku	(Croatia) Zadar	33
17	(Bosnia and Herzegovina) Nemanja Gordić	(Montenegro) Mornar	30
18	(United States) Chinanu Onuaku (2)	(Croatia) Zadar	41
19	(Montenegro) Marko Simonović (2)	(Serbia) Mega Soccerbet	37
20	(Croatia) Toni Nakić	(Croatia) Cibona	28
21	(Serbia) Nemanja Nenadić	(Serbia) FMP	25
22	(Serbia) Nikola Jovanović	(Bosnia and Herzegovina) Igokea	31
23	(Georgia (country)) Jacob Pullen (2)	(Montenegro) Mornar	30
24	(Serbia) Filip Čović	(Serbia) FMP	32
25	(Montenegro) Justin Cobbs (2)	(Montenegro) Budućnost VOLI	24
26	(Slovenia) Jaka Blažič (3)	(Slovenia) Cedevita Olimpija	38
SF1	(Montenegro) Justin Cobbs (3)	(Montenegro) Budućnost VOLI	34
SF2	(Montenegro) Justin Cobbs (4)	(Montenegro) Budućnost VOLI	28
SF3	(Serbia) Dejan Davidovac	(Serbia) Crvena zvezda mts	33
F1	(United States) Jordan Loyd (2)	(Serbia) Crvena zvezda mts	23
F2	(Serbia) Ognjen Dobrić (2)	(Serbia) Crvena zvezda mts	27
F3	(Montenegro) Nikola Ivanović (2)	(Montenegro) Budućnost VOLI	19
F4	(Montenegro) Justin Cobbs (5)	(Montenegro) Budućnost VOLI	29
F5	(Cameroon) Landry Nnoko	(Serbia) Crvena zvezda mts	28

Source: ABA League

=== MVP of the Month ===
Month	Player	Team	Ref.
2020
October	(Serbia) Filip Petrušev	(Serbia) Mega Soccerbet	
November	(Slovenia) Jaka Blažič	(Slovenia) Cedevita Olimpija	
December	(Serbia) Filip Petrušev (2)	(Serbia) Mega Soccerbet	
2021
January	(Slovenia) Jaka Blažič (2)	(Slovenia) Cedevita Olimpija	
February	(United States) Chinanu Onuaku	(Croatia) Zadar	
March	(Montenegro) Nikola Ivanović	(Montenegro) Budućnost VOLI	
April	(United States) Rashawn Thomas	(Serbia) Partizan NIS	

== Clubs in European competitions ==
Competition	Team	Progress		Result
EuroLeague	(Serbia) Crvena zvezda mts	Regular season		17th (10–24)
EuroCup	(Montenegro) Budućnost VOLI	Quarterfinals	▲ (2)	1–2 vs (France) Monaco
EuroCup	(Serbia) Partizan NIS	Top 16 Group F	▲ (1)	4th (2–4)
EuroCup	(Slovenia) Cedevita Olimpija	Top 16 Group G	▲ (1)	3rd (3–3)
EuroCup	(Montenegro) Mornar	Top 16 Group H	▲ (1)	4th (1–5)
Champions League	(Bosnia and Herzegovina) Igokea	Playoffs Group J	▲ (1)	3rd (3–3)

== See also ==
- List of current ABA League First Division team rosters
- 2020–21 ABA League Second Division
- 2020–21 Junior ABA League
- 2020–21 WABA League

2020–21 domestic competitions

- 2020–21 Basketball Championship of Bosnia and Herzegovina
- (Croatia) 2020–21 HT Premijer liga
- (Montenegro) 2020–21 Prva A liga
- 2020–21 Basketball League of Serbia
- (Slovenia) 2020–21 Slovenian Basketball League

Teams

- 2020–21 KK Cedevita Olimpija season
- 2020–21 KK Crvena zvezda season
- 2020–21 KK Partizan season
