= Rok Radović =

Slovenian basketball player

No. 3 – Cedevita Olimpija
- Position: Small forward / power forward
- League: 1. SKL; ABA League; EuroCup

Personal information
- Born: February 4, 2001 (age 25) Ljubljana, Slovenia
- Listed height: 2.01 m (6 ft 7 in)
- Listed weight: 103 kg (227 lb)

Career information
- Playing career: 2017–present

Career history
- 2017–2019: Cedevita Zagreb
- 2017–2018: →Mladost Čačinci
- 2019–present: Cedevita Olimpija
- 2019: →OKK Beograd
- 2021–2022: →Cedevita Junior

Career highlights
- 5× Slovenian League champion (2021, 2023–2026); 3× Slovenian Cup winner (2023–2026); Slovenian Supercup winner (2020); All-Junior Adriatic League Team (2019)

Rok Radović (born February 4, 2001) is a Slovenian professional basketball player for Cedevita Olimpija of the ABA League. He is a 2.01m tall small forward.

== Professional career ==
Radović started playing professional basketball for Cedevita Zagreb. During the 2019–20 season, he was loaned to OKK Beograd of the Basketball League of Serbia. In August 2021, he joined Cedevita Junior.
