= Blaž Habot =

Slovenian basketball player

Free agent
- Position: Center / power forward

Personal information
- Born: 13 December 2000 (age 25) Maribor, Slovenia
- Listed height: 2.06 m (6 ft 9 in)
- Listed weight: 125 kg (276 lb)

Career information
- NBA draft: 2022: undrafted
- Playing career: 2019–present

Career history
- 2019–2020: Konjice
- 2020–2021: Hopsi Polzela
- 2021–2023: Cedevita Olimpija
- 2021: → Ilirija

Career highlights
- 2× Slovenian League champion (2022, 2023); 2× Slovenian Cup winner (2022, 2023)

Blaž Habot (born 13 December 2000) is a Slovenian professional basketball player. He is a 2.06 m (6 ft 9 in) tall center.

== Career ==
In 2019, Habot started playing senior basketball with Konjice in the Slovenian third division.

In September 2020 he signed with Hopsi Polzela.

On 10 August 2021 Habot signed a four-year contract with Cedevita Olimpija.
