= Luka Rupnik =

Slovenian basketball player

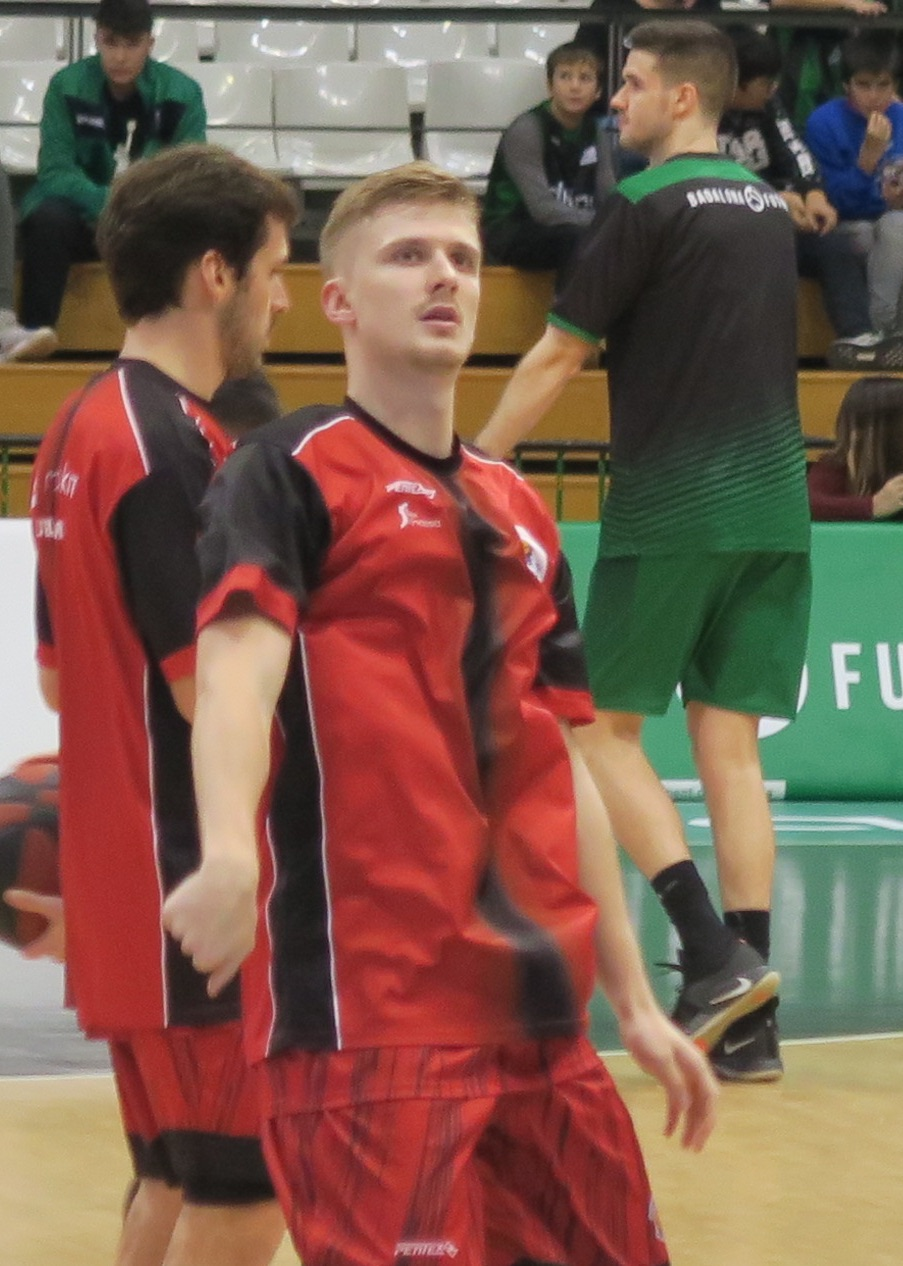
- Rupnik in 2018

Personal information
- Born: 20 May 1993 (age 33) Ljubljana, Slovenia
- Listed height: 1.86 m (6 ft 1 in)
- Listed weight: 80 kg (176 lb)

Career information
- NBA draft: 2015: undrafted
- Playing career: 2009–2025
- Position: Point guard

Career history
- 2009–2012: Slovan
- 2012–2016: Olimpija
- 2016: Força Lleida
- 2016–2019: Fuenlabrada
- 2019–2020: Antwerp Giants
- 2020: Nymburk
- 2020: Zaragoza
- 2020–2021: Cedevita Olimpija
- 2021–2022: Yalovaspor BK
- 2022–2023: San Pablo Burgos
- 2023–2025: Poitiers

Career highlights
- Slovenian League champion (2021); Slovenian Cup winner (2013); Belgian Cup winner (2020); Belgian Basketball Cup MVP (2020); Turkish League assists leader (2022)

Luka Rupnik (born 20 May 1993) is a Slovenian former professional basketball player. He represented the Slovenian national basketball team. Standing at 1.86 m (6 ft 1 in), he plays at the point guard position.

== Professional career ==
After spending four seasons in Slovenian powerhouse Union Olimpija, in Summer 2016 he moved to Actel Força Lleida of the Spanish second division. On 1 November 2016, after averaging 15 points and 6.8 assists in the first six games of the season, he agreed a three-year contract with Liga ACB and EuroCup team Montakit Fuenlabrada.

On 10 September 2019, Rupnik signed one-year contract with Belgian vice-champion Antwerp Giants. Rupnik averaged 10 points, 3.2 rebounds and 5 assists per game in the Belgian league and BCL. On 25 July 2020, he signed with Nymburk of the Czech NBL.

On 16 October 2020, he signed with Casademont Zaragoza of the Liga ACB.

On 6 December 2020, Rupnik signed with Cedevita Olimpija of the Slovenian League. Rupnik averaged 5.3 points and 4.3 assists per game.

On 9 December 2021, Rupnik signed with Semt77 Yalovaspor of the Turkish Basketball Super League (BSL). He averaged 11.7 points, 3.9 rebounds, league-high 8.1 assists and 1.3 steals per game.

On 7 November 2022, Rupnik signed with for San Pablo Burgos of the Spanish LEB Oro until the end of the 2022–23 season.

At the age 31 Rupnik announced retirement from pro basketball.

== International career ==
Rupnik debuted for Slovenia at the EuroBasket 2011. He also represented Slovenia at the EuroBasket 2015 where they were eliminated by Latvia in the round of 16.
