= Rion Brown =

American basketball player (born 1991)

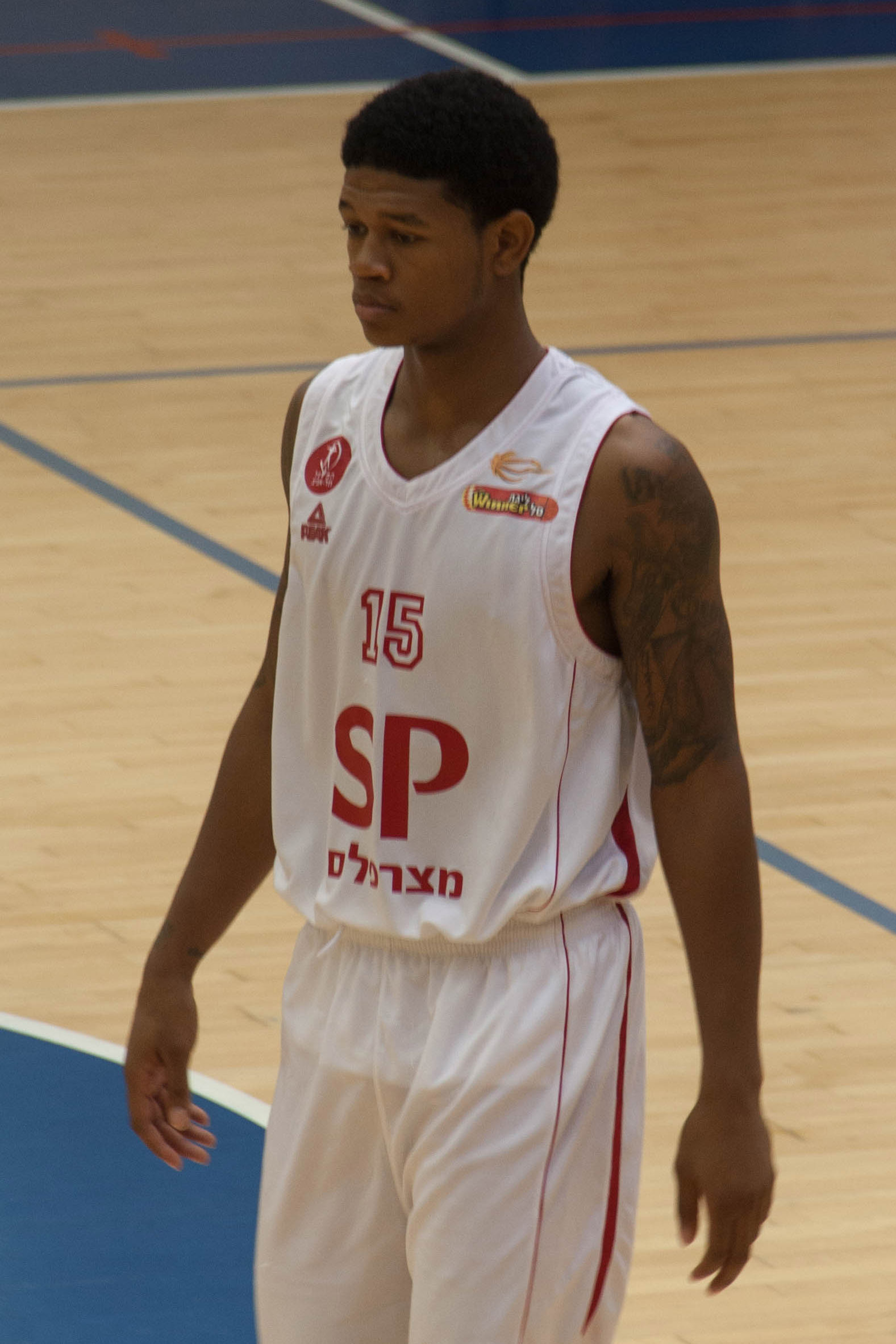
- Brown with Hapoel Tel Aviv, in 2014.

Personal information
- Born: September 3, 1991 (age 35)
- Listed height: 6 ft 6 in (1.98 m)
- Listed weight: 216 lb (98 kg)

Career information
- High school: Liberty County (Hinesville, Georgia)
- College: Miami (Florida) (2010–2014)
- NBA draft: 2014: undrafted
- Playing career: 2014–present
- Position: Small forward / shooting guard

Career history
- 2014: Hapoel Tel Aviv
- 2014–2016: Excelsior Brussels
- 2016–2017: Kataja
- 2017–2018: JDA Dijon
- 2018–2019: Promitheas Patras
- 2019–2020: Panathinaikos
- 2020: Tofaş
- 2020–2021: Cedevita Olimpija
- 2021–2022: BC Enisey
- 2022: Agua Caliente Clippers
- 2022–2023: Nanterre 92
- 2023–2024: ADA Blois
- 2024–2025: Panionios

Career highlights
- Slovenian League champion (2021); Slovenian Supercup winner (2020); Greek League All Star (2019); Finnish League champion (2017); Third-team All-ACC (2014)

Rion Cortez Brown (born September 3, 1991) is an American professional basketball player for Panionios of the Greek Basket League. He is a 6-foot-6-inch (1.98 m) tall swingman.

== Early life ==
Brown attended Liberty County High School, in Hinesville, Georgia, where he played high school basketball. In high school, he was a teammate of Jordan McRae.

== College career ==
Brown played college basketball at the University of Miami, with the Miami Hurricanes, from 2010 to 2014. As a senior, he averaged 15.5 points, 5.8 rebounds, and 2.3 assists per game.

== Professional career ==
Brown began his pro career in 2014, with the Israeli Super League club Hapoel Tel Aviv. Later that same year, he joined the Belgian League club Excelsior Brussels. In 2016, he moved to the Finnish League club Kataja Basket. He joined the French Pro A League club JDA Dijon Basket, in 2017. He moved to the Greek Basket League club Promitheas Patras, in 2018.

On July 19, 2019, Brown signed a two-year (1+1) contract with EuroLeague club and Greek Basket League champions Panathinaikos.

On January 10, 2020, Brown moved to Turkey and signed with EuroCup club Tofaş.

On August 7, he signed for the Slovenian team Cedevita Olimpija.

On August 17, 2021, Brown signed with BC Enisey of the VTB United League. He averaged 11.4 points, 4.9 rebounds, 2.0 assists and 1.3 steals per game.

On March 25, 2022, Brown was acquired via waivers by the Agua Caliente Clippers.

On June 24, 2022, he signed with Nanterre 92 of the French Pro A.

On July 4, 2023, he signed with ADA Blois of the Betclic Élite.

On August 12, 2024, Brown returned to Greece for Panionios.

== Personal life ==
Brown's father, Tico, was also a professional basketball player.
