= Milivoje Lazić =

Serbian basketball player and coach

Personal information
- Born: 13 May 1978 (age 48) Ljubljana, SR Slovenia, Yugoslavia
- Position: Head coach
- Coaching career: 1998–present

Career history

Coaching
- 1998–2005: FMP / Reflex (youth)
- 2005–2010: FMP (assistant)
- 2010–2011: Partizan (assistant)
- 2011–2012: Crvena zvezda (assistant)
- 2012: Crvena zvezda
- 2013–2014: Śląsk Wrocław
- 2020–2021: Partizan (youth)
- 2020: Partizan (interim)
- 2021–2022: Dunav
- 2022–2025: Partizan (youth)

Career highlights
- As assistant coach: 2× ABA League champion (2006, 2011); Serbian League champion (2011); 2× Serbian Cup winner (2007, 2011)

Milivoje Lazić (Serbian Cyrillic: Миливоје Лазић; born 13 May 1978) is a Slovenian-born Serbian professional basketball coach.

== Early life ==
Lazić was born in Ljubljana, SR Slovenia, Yugoslavia (now Slovenia). He played basketball for Smelt Olimpija and the Slovenian under-14 national team. In 1991, he moved to Belgrade, Serbia, following of the breakup of Yugoslavia.

In Serbia, Lazić played for OKK Beograd and Kolubara from Lazarevac. Due to the serious injury, he had to retire from professional basketball.

Lazić earned his master's degree from the University of Belgrade Faculty of Sport and Physical Education.

== Coaching career ==
Lazić began his coaching career with FMP in Belgrade. In 1998, he became the coach for youth teams. In 2005, he got promoted to the senior squad. While working at FMP, Lazić got his first taste of the NBA through Summer League coaching stints in 2007 with the Minnesota Timberwolves, Utah Jazz, Detroit Pistons and Chicago Bulls.

In 2010, Lazić joined the Partizan staff of head coach Vlada Jovanović. A year later, he joined the Crvena zvezda staff of head coach Svetislav Pešić.

After the end of 2011–12 season and resign of coach Pešić, Lazić become the head coach of Crvena zvezda. Later, Lazić got fired on 4 October 2012 after two consecutive losses in the first two games at the start of the 2012–13 Adriatic League season.

In June 2013, he was named the head coach of Śląsk Wrocław of the Polish Basketball League.

In February 2020, Lazić became the head coach of the Partizan under-19 selection. On 30 October 2020, he was named the interim head coach of Partizan, following departure of Vlado Šćepanović. In his Partizan debut on 31 October, Lazić led the team to a 90–84 overtime loss to Igokea in the Adriatic League. He finished his stint as the interim head coach with a 0–1 record on 5 November.

In September 2021, Dunav added Lazić as their new head coach following a cooperation agreement with Partizan.

== See also ==
- List of KK Crvena zvezda head coaches
- List of KK Partizan head coaches
