= Alen Hodžić =

Slovene basketball player

Free agent
- Position: Shooting guard

Personal information
- Born: August 11, 1992 (age 34) Koper, Slovenia
- Listed height: 1.91 m (6 ft 3 in)
- Listed weight: 82 kg (181 lb)

Career information
- NBA draft: 2014: undrafted
- Playing career: 2008–present

Career history
- 2008–2009: Luka Koper
- 2009–2011: Koš Koper
- 2011–2012: Parklji Ljubljana
- 2012–2013: Helios Suns
- 2013–2016: Portorož
- 2016–2017: Hopsi Polzela
- 2017–2020: Primorska
- 2020–2022: Cedevita Olimpija

Career highlights
- ABA League 2 champion (2019); 2× Slovenian League champion (2019, 2021); 4× Slovenian Cup winner (2018–2020, 2022); Slovenian Supercup winner (2020)

Alen Hodžić (born August 8, 1992, in Koper, Slovenia) is a Slovenian professional basketball player who last played for Cedevita Olimpija of the Slovenian League.

== Professional career ==
Hodžić started playing professional basketball for Luka Koper. In May 2017, Hodžić signed with Sixt Primorska. He helped the club win the Slovenian League and the Slovenian Cup.

On 29 May 2020, he signed a two-year deal with Cedevita Olimpija.

== National team career ==
Hodžić debuted for the Slovenian national basketball team in 2020.

== Personal life ==
He is religiously Muslim of Bosnian descent.
