= Dan Duščak =

Slovenian basketball player

- Duščak in 2026

No. 7 – Bilbao Basket
- Position: Point guard
- League: Liga ACB

Personal information
- Born: 2 July 2002 (age 24) Ljubljana, Slovenia
- Listed height: 1.85 m (6 ft 1 in)

Career information
- Playing career: 2018–present

Career history
- 2018–2020: Real Madrid B
- 2020–2022: Cedevita Olimpija
- 2021–2022: Ilirija
- 2022–2023: Gran Canaria
- 2023–2026: Oviedo
- 2026–present: Bilbao

Career highlights
- EuroCup champion (2023); 2× Slovenian League champion (2021, 2022); 2× Slovenian Supercup winner (2020, 2021)

Dan Duščak (born 2 July 2002) is a Slovenian professional basketball player for Surne Bilbao of the Spanish Liga ACB. He is a 1.85m tall point guard.

== Professional career ==
Duščak made his first basketball steps in KK Grosuplje. In 2017 he moved to Real Madrid where he played for its youth selections.

On 3 July 2020 Duščak signed his first professional with Cedevita Olimpija.

On July 7, 2023, he signed for Alimerka Oviedo of the Spanish Primera FEB.

On June 11, 2026, he signed for Surne Bilbao of the Spanish Liga ACB.

== Personal life ==
His father, Slavko Duščak, is a former international basketball player. Currently, he is a basketball coach at ŽKK Grosuplje.
