= Luka Ščuka =

Slovenian basketball player

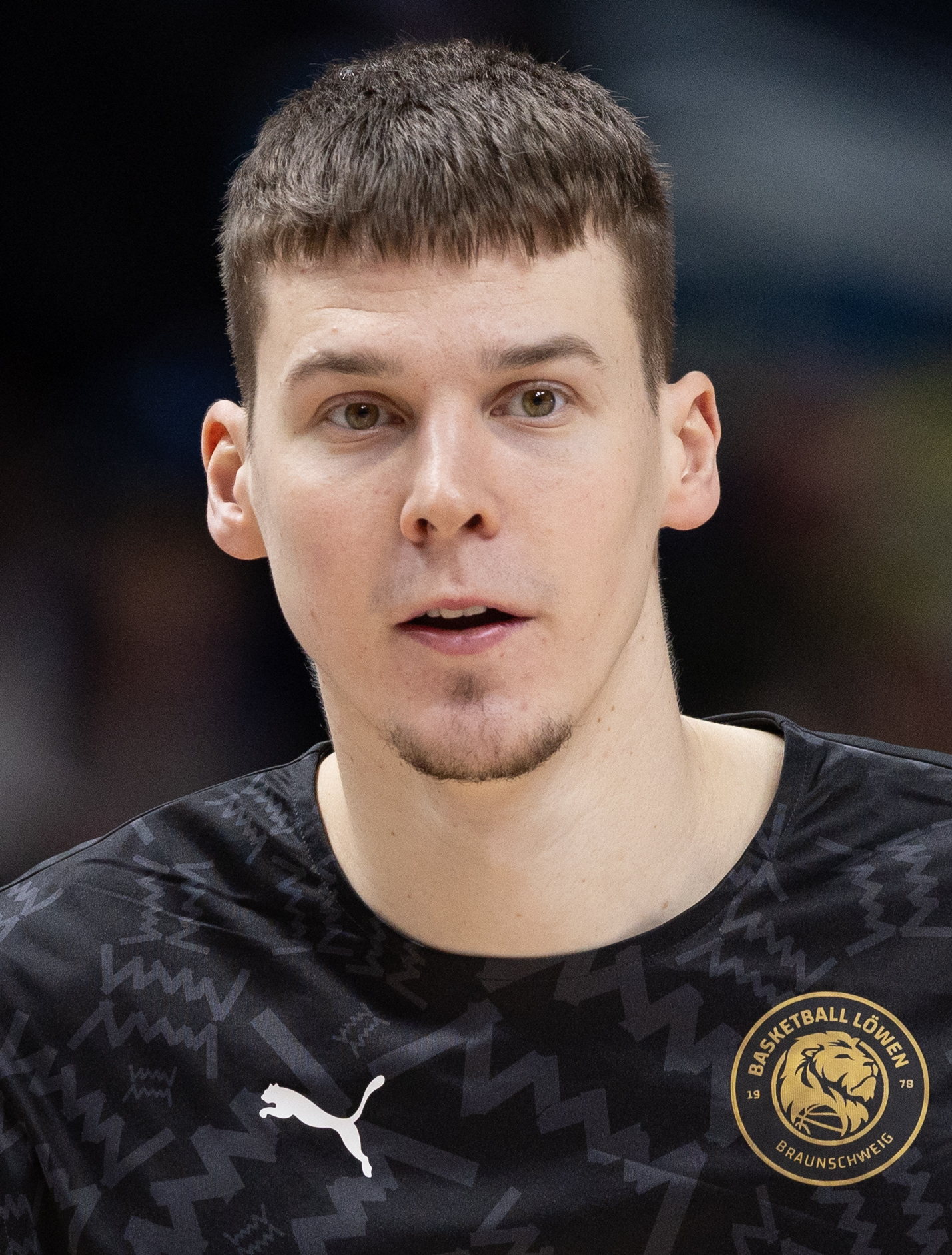

No. 3 – Bàsquet Manresa
- Position: Power forward / small forward
- League: Liga ACB; EuroCup

Personal information
- Born: 23 May 2002 (age 24) Šempeter pri Gorici, Slovenia
- Listed height: 2.08 m (6 ft 10 in)

Career information
- NBA draft: 2024: undrafted
- Playing career: 2020–present

Career history
- 2020–2024: Cedevita Olimpija
- 2022–2023: →Mornar
- 2024–2026: Löwen Braunschweig
- 2026–present: Bàsquet Manresa

Career highlights
- 2× Slovenian League champion (2021, 2024); 2× Slovenian Cup winner (2022, 2024)
Medals
Men's basketball
Representing Slovenia
FIBA U18 European Championship
Bronze medal – third place	2019 Greece	Team

Luka Ščuka (born 23 May 2002) is a Slovenian professional basketball player for Bàsquet Manresa of the Liga ACB and the EuroCup. He is a 2.08 m (6' 10") tall forward.

== Professional career ==
Ščuka started playing basketball for Nova Gorica mladi.

On 24 September 2020 Ščuka signed a four-year contract with the Cedevita Olimpija.

On 23 June 2022 Ščuka was loaned to Mornar of the ABA League and the Montenegrin League.

On July 17, 2024, he signed with Löwen Braunschweig of the Basketball Bundesliga.

Ščuka joined the New York Knicks for the 2025 NBA Summer League.

On November 2, 2026, he signed with Kids&Us Manresa of the Liga ACB and the EuroCup.
