= Maxime Courby =

French basketball player

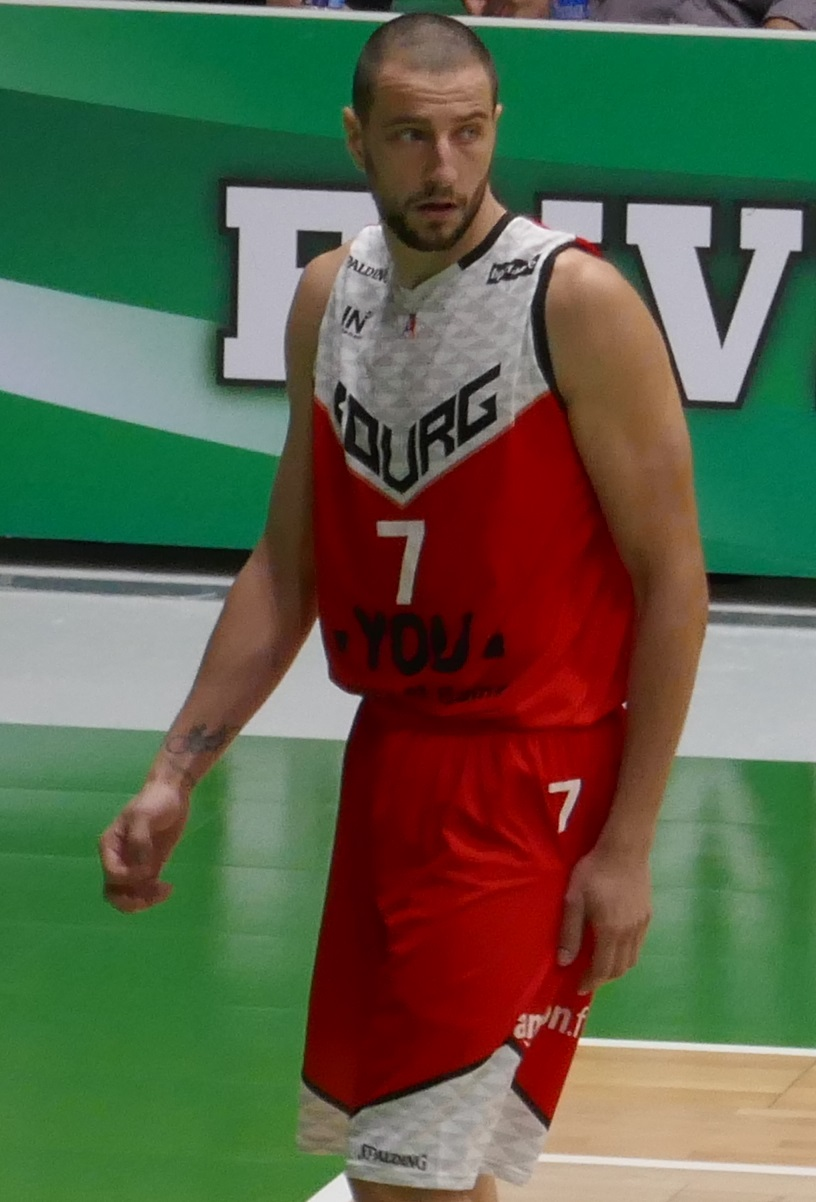

No. 7 – JL Bourg
- Position: Small forward
- League: LNB Pro A EuroCup

Personal information
- Born: 23 November 1990 (age 35) Roubaix, France
- Listed height: 6 ft 7 in (2.01 m)
- Listed weight: 205 lb (93 kg)

Career information
- NBA draft: 2012: undrafted
- Playing career: 2008–present

Career history
- 2008–2010: BCM Gravelines-Dunkerque
- 2010-2012: Antibes Sharks
- 2012–2015: SPO Rouen
- 2015–present: JL Bourg

Career highlights
- LNB Pro B champion (2017)
Medals
Men's basketball
Representing France
FIBA Europe Under-20 Championship
Gold medal – first place	2010 Croatia

Maxime Courby (born 23 November 1990) is a French professional basketball player for JL Bourg of LNB Pro A and the EuroCup.

== Professional career ==
On 15 June 2011 he signed for three seasons at Antibes Sharks.

On 21 June 2012 he signed up for a season with SPO Rouen.

In January 2013, he suffered a broken nose. On 6 April 2013 he suffered a sprained ankle.

On 24 June 2014 he decided to stay in Rouen and honor his last year of contract.

On 30 May 2015 he signed for two years at JL Bourg.
