= Rod Camphor =

American basketball player (born 1992)

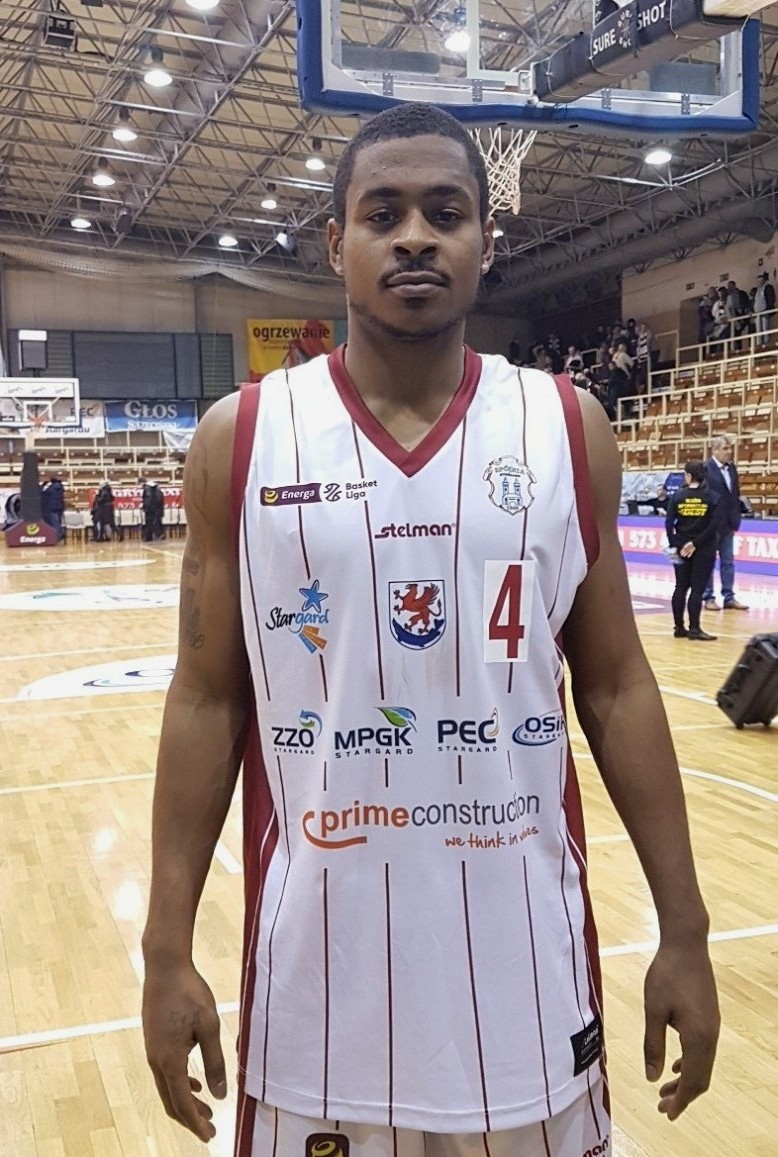
- Camphor with Spójnia Stargard

Free agent
- Position: Point guard / shooting guard

Personal information
- Born: March 10, 1992 (age 34) Baltimore, Maryland, US
- Listed height: 6 ft 3 in (1.91 m)
- Listed weight: 206 lb (93 kg)

Career information
- High school: Paul Laurence Dunbar (Baltimore, Maryland)
- College: Highland CC (2010–2012); Southwestern Oklahoma (2012–2014)
- NBA draft: 2014: undrafted
- Playing career: 2014–present

Career history
- 2014–2015: Nevėžis
- 2015–2016: Bayer Giants Leverkusen
- 2016: KTE-Duna Aszfalt
- 2016–2017: Hamburg Towers
- 2017: Leuven Bears
- 2017–2018: Turów Zgorzelec
- 2018: Kymis
- 2019: Spójnia Stargard
- 2019–2020: Rosa Radom
- 2020–2021: Krka
- 2021: US Monastir
- 2021–2022: Astoria Bydgoszcz
- 2022: Al-Karamah
- 2022–2023: Karditsa

Career highlights
- Slovenian Cup winner (2021); GAC Player of the Year (2014); First-team All-GAC (2014)

Rod Camphor (born March 10, 1992) is an American professional basketball player who last played for Karditsa of the Greek Basket League. He played college basketball at Highland Community College and at Southwestern Oklahoma State. He is a 1.91 m (6 ft 3 in) tall shooting guard.

== High school ==
Camphor attended Paul Laurence Dunbar High School, in Baltimore, Maryland, where he played high school basketball.

== College career ==
Coming from Baltimore, Maryland, Camphor left his hometown after high school and went to Highland Community College. With the local university team, he went to the NJCAA, the league of two-year universities, at the start. In 2012, he moved to Southwestern Oklahoma State University at the NCAA Division II. During his senior year, Camphor averaged 17.7 points per game, being the best scorer of the team.

== Professional career ==
After going undrafted in the 2014 NBA draft, Camphor joined Nevėžis of the Lithuanian League. In December 2015, Camphor signed with Bayer Giants Leverkusen. He went on to average 15.5 points, 3.9 rebounds and 3.3 assists per game. Leverkusen missed this season's relegation in the Bundesliga ProA.

The next season, he joined KTE-Duna Aszfalt in Hungary, but he left the team in order to return to Germany for Hamburg Towers.

On July 12, 2017, he joined Leuven Bears of the Pro Basketball League. He played nine games for his former team registered averages of 8.4 points and 3.8 assists per game. On November, he left the club and joined Turów Zgorzelec.

On June 11, 2018, he joined Kymis of the Greek League. On December 31, 2018, Camphor was amicably released from the Greek team, citing personal reasons.

Camphor spent the 2019–20 season in Poland with Rosa Radom, averaging 16.4 points, 3.1 rebounds and 4.4 assists per game. On July 27, 2020, he has signed with Krka of the Slovenian League. Camphor averaged 8.2 points, 1.8 assists and 1.7 rebounds per game. On October 7, 2021, he signed with US Monastir of the Championnat National A.

Later in the same month he went back to Poland and joined Astoria Bydgoszcz.
