= Mikael Hopkins =

Hungarian-American basketball player

No. 00 – BCM Gravelines-Dunkerque
- Position: Center
- League: LNB Élite

Personal information
- Born: June 23, 1993 (age 33) Washington, D.C., U.S.
- Listed height: 2.06 m (6 ft 9 in)
- Listed weight: 105 kg (231 lb)

Career information
- High school: DeMatha (Hyattsville, Maryland)
- College: Georgetown (2011–2015)
- NBA draft: 2015: undrafted
- Playing career: 2015–present

Career history
- 2015–2016: İstanbul DSİ
- 2017: Samsunspor DSI
- 2017: Yalovaspor
- 2017–2018: Samsunspor DSI
- 2018–2019: Balkan Botevgrad
- 2019–2021: Cedevita Olimpija
- 2021–2023: Reggio Emilia
- 2023–2024: Enisey
- 2024–2025: Fukushima Firebonds
- 2025–2026: Parma Basket Perm
- 2026–present: BCM Gravelines-Dunkerque

Career highlights
- Slovenian League champion (2021); Slovenian Supercup winner (2020); Bulgarian League champion (2019)

Mikael Hopkins (born June 23, 1993) is an American-Hungarian professional basketball player for BCM Gravelines-Dunkerque of the LNB Élite. Standing at 2.06 m (6 ft 9 in), he plays the Center position. He played college basketball for the Georgetown Hoyas.

== High school career ==
Hopkins attended the DeMatha Catholic High School in Hyattsville, Maryland. Hopkins led DeMatha to three conference and city championships.

== College career ==
In October 2010, Hopkins committed to play for the Georgetown Hoyas. As a freshman, Hopkins appeared in 30 games in their 2011–12 season. Over the season, he averaged 2.4 points and 1.1 rebounds in 6.8 minutes per game. On December 3, 2011, he scored season/career-high 12 points and had three rebounds in an 84–44 win over NJIT.

As a sophomore, Hopkins appeared in 32 games (including 31 starts) in the Hoyas' 2012–13 season. At the season's end, he finished sixth on the team in scoring with 5.9 points per game. Also over the season, he averaged 2.9 rebounds, 1.3 assists, 1.1 blocks, and 0.9 steals per game. Hopkins reached double figures in scoring seven times and grabbed at least four rebounds 12 times during the season. On February 11, 2013, Hopkins scored 6 points and had a career-high 9 rebounds against Marquette. On March 15, Hopkins scored a career-high 15 points and had 8 rebounds against Syracuse in the 2013 Big East tournament.

As a junior, Hopkins appeared in all 33 games, including 19 starts, in the Hoyas' 2013–14 season. At the season's end, he finished averaging 6.0 points and 4.9 rebounds per game. Hopkins was third on the team in rebounds and led the team with 50 blocked shots.

As a senior, Hopkins appeared in all 33 games, including 24 starts, in the Hoyas' 2014–15 season.

== Professional career ==
After going undrafted in the 2015 NBA draft, Hopkins joined İstanbul DSİ of the Turkish First League (2nd-tier) for the 2015–16 season. On February 1, 2017, Hopkins signed with Samsunspor DSI of the Turkish First League.

On July 31, 2017, Hopkins signed with Yalova Group BelediyeSpor of the Turkish First League.

In December 2017, he joined back to Samsunspor DSI for the rest of the 2017–18 season.

In August 2018, Hopkins signed for Balkan Botevgrad of the Bulgarian League for the 2018–19 season. Over 16 games at the 2018–19 FIBA Europe Cup season, he averaged 14.7 points, 8.3 rebounds and 2.6 assists per game.

On July 19, 2019, Hopkins signed a two-year contract with Slovenian club Cedevita Olimpija. During the 2020–21 season, he averaged 10.1 points and 6.3 rebounds per game.

On August 1, 2021, Hopkins signed with Reggio Emilia of the Italian Lega Basket Serie A (LBA).

On June 27, 2026, he signed with Gravelines-Dunkerque of the LNB Elite.

== International career ==
Hopkins was nationalized as Hungarian and plays for the Hungary men's national basketball team since 2022.
