= 2022–23 Slovenian Basketball League =

Liga Nova KBM
- Season: 2022–23
- Duration: October 2022 – March 2023
- Teams: 11
- TV partner: Sport Klub

Regular season
- Season MVP: (Slovenia) Blaz Mahkovic

Finals
- Finals MVP: (United States) Yogi Ferrell

Statistical leaders
Points	(United States) Tavian Dunn-Martin	20.1
Rebounds	(Slovenia) Dino Murić	8.2
Assists	(Slovenia) Daniel Vujasinović	9.4

The 2022–23 Slovenian Basketball League, also known as Liga Nova KBM due to sponsorship reasons, is the 32nd season of the Premier A Slovenian Basketball League.

== Format ==
=== Regular season ===
In the first phase, ten teams compete in a home-and-away round-robin series (18 games total). Teams advanced from the regular season to one of two postseason stages, depending on their league position.

=== Second phase ===
The top five teams from the regular season advanced to the championship phase. Cedevita Olimpija start their competition from this phase. These teams start the second phase from scratch, with no results carrying over from the regular season. Each team plays a total of 10 games in this phase; as in the regular season, a home-and-away round-robin is used.

The last five teams enter a home-and-away round-robin playout-league where two best teams qualify to quarterfinals.

==== Playoffs ====
Eight teams join the playoffs.

== Teams ==
LTH Castings was promoted and Triglav Kranj was relegated

=== Venues and locations ===
Location of teams in the 2022–23 Slovenian Basketball League

Club	Location	Venue	Capacity
Cedevita Olimpija	Ljubljana	Arena Stožice	12,500
Helios Suns	Domžale	Komunalni center Hall	2,500
GGD Šenčur	Šenčur	ŠD Šenčur	800
Hopsi	Polzela	ŠD Polzela	1,800
Krka	Novo Mesto	ŠD Leona Štuklja	2,500
Nutrispoint Ilirija	Ljubljana	Tivoli Hall	7,000
Rogaška	Rogaška Slatina	ŠD Rogaška Slatina	800
Šentjur	Šentjur	Dvorana OŠ Hruševec	700
Terme Olimia	Podčetrtek	ŠD Podčetrtek	
LTH Castings	Škofja Loka		
Zlatorog	Laško	Tri Lilije Hall	2,500

Teams that play in the 2022–23 Adriatic League
Teams that play in the 2022–23 Adriatic League Second Division
Teams that play in the 2022–23 Alpe Adria Cup

== Awards ==
=== Regular season MVP ===
- (Slovenia) Blaz Mahkovic (Helios Suns Domzale)

=== Finals MVP ===
- (United States) Yogi Ferrell (KK Cedevita Olimpija)
