= Marko Simonović (basketball, born 1999) =

Montenegrin basketball player (born 1999)

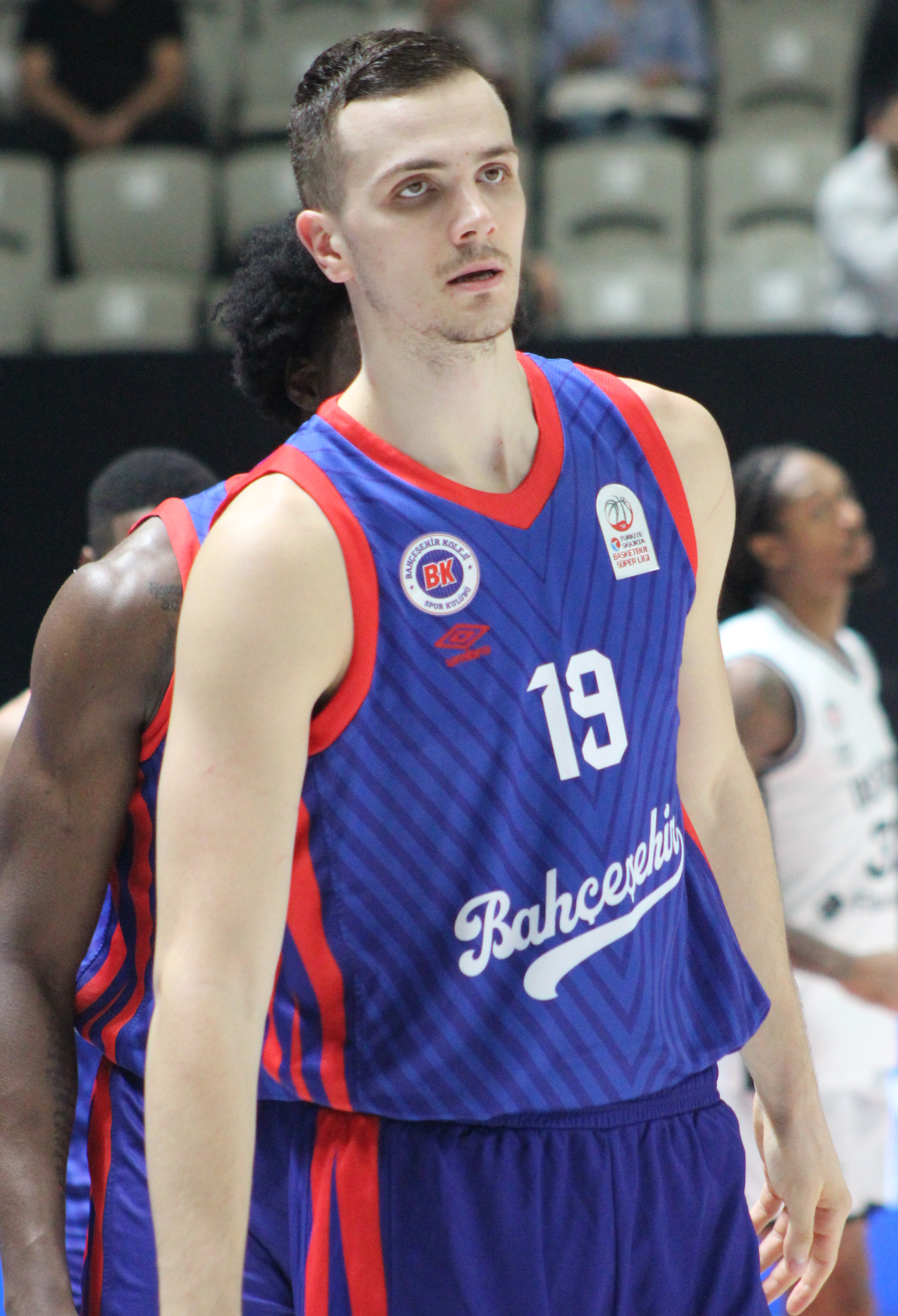
- Simonović with Bahçeşehir Koleji in 2024

No. 19 – BC Roma
- Position: Center / power forward
- League: LBA; EuroCup

Personal information
- Born: October 15, 1999 (age 27) Kolašin, Montenegro, FR Yugoslavia
- Listed height: 7 ft 0 in (2.13 m)
- Listed weight: 240 lb (109 kg)

Career information
- NBA draft: 2020: 2nd round, 44th overall pick
- Drafted by: Chicago Bulls
- Playing career: 2017–present

Career history
- 2017–2018: Mens Sana Siena
- 2018–2019: Petrol Olimpija
- 2018: →Roseto Sharks
- 2019–2021: Mega Basket
- 2021–2023: Chicago Bulls
- 2021–2023: →Windy City Bulls
- 2023–2024: Crvena zvezda
- 2024: →Beşiktaş
- 2024–2025: Bahçeşehir Koleji
- 2025–2026: Türk Telekom
- 2026–present: BC Roma

Career highlights
- All-ABA League Team (2021); ABA League rebounding leader (2021)
- Stats at NBA.com
- Stats at Basketball Reference

Marko Simonović (Serbian Cyrillic: Марко Симоновић; born October 15, 1999) is a Montenegrin professional basketball player for BC Roma of the Italian Lega Basket Serie A (LBA) and the EuroCup.

== Professional career ==
=== Mens Sana (2017–2018) ===
Simonović started playing professional basketball for Italian lower-league club PMS Moncalieri in 2015. In July 2017, Simonović signed a contract for Mens Sana Siena.

=== Olimpija (2018–2019) ===
On June 19, 2018, Simonović signed a multi-year contract for Petrol Olimpija.

=== Mega Basket (2019–2021) ===
On July 19, 2019, Simonović was loaned out to Mega Bemax for two years.

Simonovic averaged 16.8 points per game on 51% shooting from the field on 11.5 attempts per game, 31% from three on 2.5 attempts per game, 80% from the free throw line on 5.2 attempts per game, eight rebounds, 3.5 offensive rebounds, 1.2 assists, one steal, 1.2 blocks, 2.2 turnovers and 3.8 personal fouls per game in a starting role where he played 29.7 minutes a game in a total of 24 games in all competitions.

=== Chicago Bulls (2021–2023) ===
On 18 November 2020, Simonović was selected with the 44th overall pick in the 2020 NBA draft by the Chicago Bulls. In August 2021, Simonović joined the Chicago Bulls for the NBA Summer League. On 9 August, he made his debut in the Summer League in a 94–77 loss to the New Orleans Pelicans in which he posted 13 points and 5 rebounds in 15 minutes. On August 18, 2021, Simonović officially signed a three-year contract with the Bulls. On 22 November, Simonović made his NBA debut in a 109–77 loss to the Indiana Pacers in which he posted one point and one rebound in 7 minutes.

In July 2022, Simonović joined the Bulls for the 2022 NBA Summer League. He was later named to the All-NBA Summer League Second Team.

On 6 July 2023, Simonović was waived by the Bulls.

=== Crvena zvezda (2023–2024) ===
On 8 July 2023, Simonović signed with Serbian powerhouse Crvena zvezda.

=== Beşiktaş (2024) ===
On January 3, 2024, Simonović was loaned to Beşiktaş Emlakjet of the Basketbol Süper Ligi (BSL).

=== Bahçeşehir Koleji (2024–2025) ===
On June 15, 2024, Simonović signed with Bahçeşehir Koleji of the Basketbol Süper Ligi (BSL).

=== Türk Telekom (2025–2026) ===
On July 19, 2025, Simonović signed with Türk Telekom of the Turkish Basketbol Süper Ligi (BSL).

== Career statistics ==
Legend
GP	Games played	GS	Games started	MPG	Minutes per game
FG%	Field-goal percentage	3P%	3-point field-goal percentage	FT%	Free-throw percentage
RPG	Rebounds per game	APG	Assists per game	SPG	Steals per game
BPG	Blocks per game	PPG	Points per game	PIR	Performance index rating
**Bold**	Career high

=== NBA ===
==== Regular season ====
Year	Team	GP	GS	MPG	FG%	3P%	FT%	RPG	APG	SPG	BPG	PPG
2021–22	Chicago	**9**	0	**3.9**	.267	.200	**.727**	**1.1**	.0	**.1**	**.1**	**1.9**
2022–23	Chicago	7	0	2.9	**.286**	**.250**	.500	.3	.0	.0	.0	.9
Career		16	0	3.4	.273	.222	.692	.8	.0	.1	.1	1.4

=== EuroLeague ===
Year	Team	GP	GS	MPG	FG%	3P%	FT%	RPG	APG	SPG	BPG	PPG	PIR
2023–24	Crvena zvezda	11	3	7.5	.419	.182	.750	1.5	.1	.5	—	2.8	1.2
Career		11	3	7.5	.419	.182	.750	1.5	.1	.5	—	2.8	1.2

== See also ==
- List of NBA drafted players from Serbia
- List of Montenegrin NBA players
