= Luka Vončina =

Slovenian basketball player (born 1991)

No. 44 – Ilirija
- Position: Shooting guard
- League: Slovenian League

Personal information
- Born: December 27, 1991 (age 34) Ljubljana, Slovenia
- Listed height: 6 ft 3 in (1.91 m)
- Listed weight: 195 lb (88 kg)

Career information
- College: Charlotte (2010–2012)
- Playing career: 2010–present

Career history
- 2007–2010: Union Olimpija
- 2012–2013: LTH Castings
- 2013–2017: Helios Suns
- 2017–2018: Ilirija
- 2018–2020: Koper Primorska
- 2021–present: Ilirija

Career highlights
- 2x Slovenian League champion (2016, 2019); ABA League 2 champion (2019); 2× Slovenian Cup winner (2019, 2020); Alpe Adria Cup champion (2016)

Luka Vončina (born December 27, 1991, in Ljubljana, Slovenia) is a Slovenian professional basketball player for Ilirija of the Slovenian League. He is a 1.91 m tall Shooting guard.
