= Marko Radovanović =

Serbian basketball player

Personal information
- Born: 3 April 1996 (age 30) Čačak, FR Yugoslavia
- Listed height: 2.08 m (6 ft 10 in)

Career information
- Playing career: 2014–present
- Position: Power forward

Career history
- 2014–2018: Crvena zvezda
- 2014–2016: →FMP
- 2016–2017: →Borac Čačak
- 2017–2018: →FMP
- 2018–2021: FMP
- 2021–2023: Cedevita Olimpija
- 2023–2024: Krka

Career highlights
- Slovenian Cup winner (2022); Euroleague IJT champion (2014)
Medals
Men'sbasketball
Representing Serbia
U18 European Championship
Silver medal – second place	2014 Turkey	Team
FIBA Europe Under-16 Championship
Bronze medal – third place	2012 Lithuania & Latvia	Team

Marko Radovanović (Serbian Cyrillic: Марко Радовановић, born 3 April 1996) is a Serbian professional basketball player who last played for Krka of the Slovenian League. Now he plays for Szolnoki Olajbányász, in the hungarian league.

== Early career ==
Radovanović grew up with KK Mladost Čačak youth system. In 2013, he joined the Crvena zvezda U18 team. He won the 2014 Euroleague NIJT.

== Professional career ==
In April 2014, Radovanović signed a four-year professional contract for Crvena zvezda. Prior to the 2014–15 season he was loaned to FMP where he played for two seasons. In summer 2016, Radovanović was loaned to his hometown team Borac for the 2016–17 season. In June 2017, Radovanović was loaned to FMP.

On 2 July 2021 he signed with Cedevita Olimpija of the Slovenian League.

== National team career ==
Radovanović was a member of the Serbian under-16 team that won the bronze medal the 2012 FIBA Europe Under-16 Championship in Latvia and Lithuania. Over four tournament games, he averaged 2.8 points and 3.8 rebounds per game. Radovanović was a member of the Serbian under-18 team that won the silver medal at the 2014 FIBA Europe Under-18 Championship in Konya, Turkey. Over nine tournament games, he averaged 5.2 points, 4.2 rebounds and 0.4 assists per game. Radovanović was a member of the Serbian under-20 team that competed at the 2016 FIBA Europe Under-20 Championship in Helsinki, Finland. Over nine tournament games, he averaged 4.4 points, 1.4 rebounds and 0.9 assists per game.
