= Dino Murić =

Slovenian basketball player

GGD Šenčur
- Position: Power forward
- League: Slovenian League

Personal information
- Born: February 14, 1990 (age 36) Ljubljana, SFR Yugoslavia
- Listed height: 6 ft 7 in (2.01 m)

Career information
- NBA draft: 2012: undrafted
- Playing career: 2007–present

Career history
- 2004–2010: Parklji
- 2007–2008: → TCG Mercator
- 2010–2015: Union Olimpija
- 2017–present: Šenčur GDD

Career highlights
- 3× Slovenian Cup winner (2011–2013); Slovenian Supercup winner (2013); Slovenian Cup MVP (2013)

Dino Murić (born February 14, 1990) is a Slovenian professional basketball player for Šenčur GGD of the Slovenian League. He is a 2.00 m (6 ft 7 in) tall power forward.

In October 2010, he signed with the Slovenian club Union Olimpija.

== Personal life ==
His younger brother Edo is also a professional basketball player.
