= 2020–21 Slovenian Basketball League =

Liga Nova KBM
- Season: 2020–21
- Duration: October 2020 – March 2021
- Teams: 11
- TV partner: Sport Klub

The 2020–21 Slovenian Basketball League, also known as Liga Nova KBM due to sponsorship reasons, was the 30th season of the Premier A Slovenian Basketball League.

== Format ==
=== Regular season ===
In the first phase, ten teams competed in a home-and-away round-robin series (18 games total). Teams advanced from the regular season to one of two postseason stages, depending on their league position.

=== Second phase ===
The top five teams from the regular season advanced to the championship phase. Cedevita Olimpija started their competition from this phase. These teams started the second phase from scratch, with no results carrying over from the regular season. Each team played a total of 10 games in this phase; as in the regular season, a home-and-away round-robin was used.

The last five teams entered a home-and-away round-robin playout-league where two best teams qualify to quarterfinals. Since KK Koper Primorska had been already disqualified, each team played 6 games in this phase instead of 8. The last team was relegated.

==== Playoffs ====
Eight teams joined the playoffs.

== Teams ==
KK Triglav Kranj was promoted.

Commission of the Basketball Federation of Slovenia hasn't been approved the licence for KK Koper Primorska. On June 30, after club's appeal the licence was granted.

On December 23, Koper Primorska.decided to withdraw from the Liga Nova KBM because of the club's financial instability. All their matches were declared with score 0-20.

=== Venues and locations ===
Location of teams in the 2020–21 Slovenian Basketball League

Club	Location	Venue	Capacity
Cedevita Olimpija	Ljubljana	Arena Stožice	12,500
Helios Suns	Domžale	Komunalni center Hall	2,500
GGD Šenčur	Šenčur	ŠD Šenčur	800
Hopsi	Polzela	ŠD Polzela	1,800
Krka	Novo Mesto	ŠD Leona Štuklja	2,500
Koper Primorska	Koper	Arena Bonifika	5,000
Rogaška	Rogaška Slatina	ŠD Rogaška Slatina	800
Šentjur	Šentjur	Dvorana OŠ Hruševec	700
Terme Olimia	Podčetrtek	ŠD Podčetrtek	
ECE Triglav	Kranj	Planina Sports Hall	800
Zlatorog	Laško	Tri Lilije Hall	2,500

Teams that play in the 2020–21 Adriatic League
Teams that play in the 2020–21 Adriatic League Second Division
Teams that play in the 2020–21 Alpe Adria Cup

=== Managerial changes ===
Team	Outgoing manager	Manner of departure	Date of vacancy	Position in table	Incoming manager	Date of appointment
Terme Olimia Podčetrtek	(Slovenia) Bojan Lazić	End of contract	–	Pre-season	(Slovenia) Davor Brečko	14 August 2020

== Regular season ==
=== League table ===
Pos	Team	Pld	W	L	PF	PA	PD	Pts	Qualification
1	Krka	18	16	2	1384	1101	+283	34	Qualification to championship group
2	GGD Šenčur	18	13	5	1382	1251	+131	31	Qualification to championship group
3	Helios Suns	18	13	5	1271	1102	+169	31	Qualification to championship group
4	Rogaška	18	12	6	1382	1239	+143	30	Qualification to championship group
5	Terme Olimia	18	10	8	1309	1256	+53	28	Qualification to championship group
6	Šentjur	18	10	8	1296	1285	+11	28	Qualification to relegation group
7	Zlatorog Laško	18	6	12	1239	1335	−96	24	Qualification to relegation group
8	Hopsi Polzela	18	6	12	1246	1374	−128	24	Qualification to relegation group
9	ECE Triglav	18	4	14	1150	1356	−206	22	Qualification to relegation group
10	Koper Primorska	18	0	18	0	360	−360	18	Withdrawn

Source: KZS.si

== Championship group ==
=== League table ===
Pos	Team	Pld	W	L	PF	PA	PD	Pts	Qualification
1	Cedevita Olimpija	10	7	3	773	729	+44	17	Qualification to playoffs
2	Krka	10	6	4	830	764	+66	16	Qualification to playoffs
3	Rogaška	10	6	4	791	807	−16	16	Qualification to playoffs
4	Helios Suns	10	5	5	727	709	+18	15	Qualification to playoffs
5	GGD Šenčur	10	3	7	775	773	+2	13	Qualification to playoffs
6	Terme Olimia	10	3	7	727	841	−114	13	Qualification to playoffs

Source: KZS.si

== Relegation group ==
=== League table ===
Pos	Team	Pld	W	L	PF	PA	PD	Pts	Qualification or relegation
1	Šentjur	15	12	3	1238	1114	+124	27	Qualification to playoffs
2	Hopsi Polzela	15	8	7	1231	1197	+34	23	Qualification to playoffs
3	Zlatorog Laško	15	8	7	1155	1152	+3	23	
4	ECE Triglav	15	2	13	1056	1217	−161	17	Relegation

Source: KZS.si

== Playoffs ==
Seeded teams played at home games 1, 3 and, in the finals, 5.

=== Bracket ===
Quarter-finals
Cedevita Olimpija	2
Hopsi Polzela	0
Helios Suns	2
GGD Šenčur	1
Krka	2
Šentjur	1
Rogaška	2
Terme Olimia	0

Semi-finals
Cedevita Olimpija	2
Helios Suns	0
Krka	2
Rogaška	0

Final
Cedevita Olimpija	3
Krka	0

== Awards ==
=== Regular season MVP ===
- (Slovenia) Dino Murić (GGD Šenčur)

=== Season MVP ===
- (Slovenia) Dino Murić (GGD Šenčur)

=== Finals MVP ===
- (United States) Kendrick Perry (Cedevita Olimpija)

== Statistical leaders ==
=== Performance Index Rating ===
Pos	Player	Club	PIR
1	(Slovenia) Dino Murić	Šenčur	24.22
2	(United States) David Nichols	Rogaška	20.03
3	(United States) Logan Routt	Zlatorog	19.90

=== Points ===
Pos	Player	Club	PPG
1	(United States) David Nichols	Rogaška	19.39
1	(Slovenia) Dino Murić	Šenčur	18.39
3	(United States) Malcolm Bernard	Rogaška	17.59

=== Rebounds ===
Pos	Player	Club	RPG
1	(United States) Aaron Carver	Hopsi Polzela	11.87
2	(Slovenia) Dino Murić	Šenčur	11.72
3	(United States) Logan Routt	Zlatorog	10.25

=== Assists ===
Pos	Player	Club	APG
1	(Slovenia) Daniel Vujasinović	Helios Suns	6.48
2	(United States) David Nichols	Rogaška	6.45
3	(Slovenia) Žan Kosić	Hopsi Polzela	6.08

== Slovenian clubs in European competitions ==
Team	Competition	Progress
Cedevita Olimpija	EuroCup	Regular season

== See also ==
- 2020–21 KK Cedevita Olimpija season
