= 2019–20 KK Cedevita Olimpija season =

Cedevita Olimpija
2019–20 season
- Chairman: Tomaž Berločnik
- Head coach: Slaven Rimac (until 27 January 2020); Jurica Golemac (from 27 January 2020)
- Arena: Arena Stožice; Tivoli Hall
- Slovenian League: Cancelled
- Adriatic League: Cancelled
- EuroCup: 6th (Group C)
- Adriatic Supercup: Runners-up
- Slovenian Cup: Runners-up
- Highest home attendance: 5,000, vs. Crvena Zvezda (1 December 2019)
- Lowest home attendance: 500, vs. GGD Šenčur (13 February 2020)
- Average home attendance: 1,638 (EuroCup)
- Biggest win: 103–75 vs. Budućnost VOLI (28 September 2019)
- Biggest defeat: 63–101 vs. Zadar (24 November 2019)
Home	Away

The 2019–20 season was the inaugural season of KK Cedevita Olimpija. The club competed in the Slovenian League, the Adriatic League and the EuroCup.

Cedevita Olimpija has lost two cup finals during the season, the 2019 Adriatic Supercup and the 2020 Slovenian Cup. The Slovenian League and the Adriatic League seasons were cancelled due to the COVID-19 pandemic.

== Overview ==
On 13 June 2019, the management boards of Cedevita and Olimpija have confirmed the appointment of Davor Užbinec as a general manager and Sani Bečirović as a sports director. On 8 July, it's announced that the first club's coach is Croatian coach Slaven Rimac, while the first player is Slovenian player Edo Murić. The Petrol Olimpija players from the 2018–19 season, Marko Simonović, Issuf Sanon, Petar Vujačić and David Kralj joined the club in July. The Cedevita Zagreb players in the previous season, Filip Krušlin, Andrija Stipanović, as well as Murić, joined the club in July.

Newly signed forward Marko Simonović was a member of the Serbia national team at the 2019 FIBA Basketball World Cup in China. On 11 September, guard Jaka Blažič was named the first team captain.

On 28 September 2019, Cedevita Olimpija lost to Partizan NIS in the 2019 ABA Supercup final in Zagreb, Croatia.

=== Season cancellation ===
On 12 March 2020, ABA League Assembly suspended the remainder of the 2019–20 season "until further notice" following the coronavirus pandemic. The club still remains to play one game until the end of the regular season and to reach the 2020 playoffs. On the same day, the Basketball Federation of Slovenia suspended the remainder of the 2020 Championship Group season due to the same reason. Prior to the Slovenian league suspension, the club played two games. On 20 March, the Basketball Federation cancelled its competitions due to the COVID-19 pandemic. On 27 May, the ABA League Assembly cancelled the 2019–20 season due to the COVID-19 pandemic.

== Players ==
=== Squad information ===
Note: Flags indicate national team eligibility at FIBA-sanctioned events. Players may hold other non-FIBA nationalities not displayed.

Cedevita Olimpija roster
Players
Coaches

Pos.	No.	Nat.	Name	Ht.	Age
PG	6	(United States)	Artis, Dominic	1.92 m (6 ft 4 in)	33 – 7 July 1993
G/F	11	(Slovenia)	Blažič, Jaka (C)	1.96 m (6 ft 5 in)	33 – 27 December 1992
PG	21	(Slovenia)	Bratož, Domen	1.89 m (6 ft 2 in)	33 – 23 March 1993
PF	5	(United States)	Hopkins, Mikael	2.06 m (6 ft 9 in)	33 – 23 June 1993
PF	4	(Slovenia)	Krampelj, Martin	2.06 m (6 ft 9 in)	31 – 10 March 1995
SG	2	(Croatia)	Krušlin, Filip	1.96 m (6 ft 5 in)	37 – 18 March 1989
C	29	(Serbia)	Marinković, Ivan	2.08 m (6 ft 10 in)	32 – 27 November 1993
PG	10	(United States)	Miller-McIntyre, Codi	1.91 m (6 ft 3 in)	32 – 1 June 1994
SG	9	(Slovenia)	Mulalić, Mirko	1.95 m (6 ft 5 in)	38 – 16 April 1988
SF	8	(Slovenia)	Murić, Edo	2.03 m (6 ft 8 in)	34 – 27 November 1991
SF	1	(Slovenia)	Radović, Rok	1.99 m (6 ft 6 in)	25 – 4 February 2001
C	13	(Bosnia and Herzegovina)	Stipanović, Andrija	2.08 m (6 ft 10 in)	39 – 18 December 1986
SG	7	(Slovenia)	Vujačić, Petar	1.96 m (6 ft 5 in)	26 – 19 January 2000
PF	17	(Slovenia)	Zagorac, Saša	2.06 m (6 ft 9 in)	42 – 1 January 1984
C	33	(Germany)	Zirbes, Maik	2.08 m (6 ft 10 in)	36 – 29 January 1990

Head coach

- (Slovenia) Jurica Golemac

Assistant coach(es)

- (Croatia) Teo Čizmić
- (Slovenia) Dragiša Drobnjak

Legend

- (C) Team captain
- Injured

=== Players with multiple nationalities ===
- (Serbia) (Slovenia) Ivan Marinković
- (Bosnia and Herzegovina) (Croatia) Andrija Stipanović

=== Depth chart ===
Pos.	Starting 5	Bench 1	Bench 2
C	Andrija Stipanović	Maik Zirbes	Saša Zagorac
PF	Mikael Hopkins	Ivan Marinković	Martin Krampelj
SF	Edo Murić	Mirko Mulalić	Rok Radović
SG	Jaka Blažič	Filip Krušlin	Petar Vujačić
PG	Codi Miller-McIntyre	Dominic Artis	Domen Bratož

=== Transactions ===
==== Players In ====
No.	Pos.	Nat.	Name	Age	Moving from		Type	Ends	Date	Source
8	SF	(Slovenia)	Edo Murić	27	Cedevita	(Croatia)	End of contract	2021	8 July 2019	
12	G	(Slovenia)	David Kralj	20	Šenčur	(Slovenia)	Loan return	Undisclosed	8 July 2019	
7	G	(Slovenia)	Petar Vujačić	19	Šenčur	(Slovenia)	Loan return	2022	8 July 2019	
4	PF	(Slovenia)	Martin Krampelj	24	Creighton Bluejays	(United States)	Undrafted	2021	12 July 2019	
9	SG	(Slovenia)	Mirko Mulalić	31	Balkan Botevgrad	(Bulgaria)	End of contract	2021	17 July 2019	
17	PF	(Slovenia)	Sašo Zagorac	35	Trefl Sopot	(Poland)	End of contract	2021	17 July 2019	
19	SF	(Serbia)	Marko Simonović	33	Zenit Saint Petersburg	(Russia)	End of contract	2021	18 July 2019	
5	PF	(United States)	Mikael Hopkins	26	Balkan Botevgrad	(Bulgaria)	End of contract	2021	19 July 2019	
11	G/F	(Slovenia)	Jaka Blažič	29	Barcelona	(Spain)	End of contract	2021	20 July 2019	
10	PG	(United States)	Codi Miller-McIntyre	25	Zenit Saint Petersburg	(Russia)	End of contract	2020	22 July 2019	
3	PG	(Armenia)	Ryan Boatright	26	Unicaja Málaga	(Spain)	End of contract	2020	30 July 2019	
33	C	(Germany)	Maik Zirbes	29	Guangxi Weizhuang	(China)	End of contract	2020	26 September 2019	
21	PG	(Slovenia)	Domen Bratož	26	Krka	(Slovenia)	End of contract	2020	20 January 2020	
1	SF	(Slovenia)	Rok Radović	18	OKK Beograd	(Serbia)	Loan return	Undisclosed	29 January 2020	
6	PG	(United States)	Dominic Artis	26	Dąbrowa Górnicza	(Poland)	Transfer	2020	30 January 2020	
4	PF	(Slovenia)	Martin Krampelj	24	MoraBanc Andorra	(Andorra)	Loan return	2021	3 February 2020	
29	C	(Serbia)	Ivan Marinković	26	Koper Primorska	(Slovenia)	Parted ways	2022	3 February 2020	
7	SG	(Slovenia)	Petar Vujačić	20	Ilirija	(Slovenia)	Loan return	2022	7 February 2020	
	C	(Croatia)	Matej Bošnjak	18	Cedevita Junior	(Croatia)	Transfer	Undisclosed	19 February 2020	

==== Players Out ====
No.	Pos.	Nat.	Name	Age	Moving to		Type	Date	Source
11	C	(Montenegro)	Marko Simonović	19	Mega Bemax	(Serbia)	Loan	20 July 2019	
12	G	(Slovenia)	David Kralj	20	Helios Suns	(Slovenia)	Loan	12 August 2019	
30	G	(Ukraine)	Issuf Sanon	19	Dnipro	(Ukraine)	Loan	26 August 2019	
7	SG	(Slovenia)	Petar Vujačić	19	Ilirija	(Slovenia)	Loan	11 October 2019	
4	PF	(Slovenia)	Martin Krampelj	24	MoraBanc Andorra	(Andorra)	Loan	17 December 2019	
3	PG	(Armenia)	Ryan Boatright	27	Avtodor Saratov	(Russia)	Parted ways	20 January 2020	
	C	(Croatia)	Matej Bošnjak	18	Cedevita Junior	(Croatia)	Loan	19 February 2020	
19	SF	(Serbia)	Marko Simonović	33	Unicaja Malaga	(Spain)	Loan	24 February 2020	

== Club ==
=== Technical Staff ===
On 27 January 2020, Cedevita Olimpija and coach Slaven Rimac have agreed on terminating their contract on mutual consent. On the same day, Cedevita Olimpija appointed a Slovenian coach Jurica Golemac as the new head coach. In January, an assistant coach Marko Maravič and a conditioning coach Slaven Hlupić left the staff. Filip Ujaković was named the new conditioning coach in January.

Position	Staff member
General Manager	(Croatia) Davor Užbinec
Technical director	(Croatia) Krešimir Novosel
Sports Director	(Slovenia) Sani Bečirovič
Team Manager	(Croatia) Matko Jovanović
Head Coach	(Slovenia) Jurica Golemac
Assistant Coaches	(Croatia) Teo Čizmić
Assistant Coaches	(Slovenia) Dragiša Drobnjak
Conditioning Coach	(Croatia) Filip Ujaković
Physiotherapist	(Slovenia) Rok Žagar
Physiotherapist	(Slovenia) Borut Černilogar
Physician	(Slovenia) Oskar Zupanc

=== Uniform ===
- Supplier: Adidas
- Main sponsor: Cedevita / Petrol
- Back sponsor: Triglav, Spar
- Shorts sponsor: Union

Home	Away

== Pre-season and friendlies ==
Cedevita Olimpija played eight pre-season friendly games. They played at the 2019 Mirza Delibašić Memorial together with Budućnost VOLI (Montenegro), Gaziantep (Turkey), and U-BT Cluj-Napoca (Romania) from 6–7 September in Sarajevo, Bosnia and Herzegovina. Cedevita Olimpija won the 15th Mirza Delibašić Memorial.

Win Loss

28 August 2019 1	Cedevita Olimpija (Slovenia)	75–61	(Slovakia) Inter Bratislava	Rogla
17:00	Scoring by quarter: 22–15, 18–18, 17–9, 18–19
	Pts: Blažič 14; Rebs: not available Asts: not available PIR: not available	Boxscore	Pts: Alcegaire 16; Rebs: not available Asts: not available PIR: not available	Arena: Rogla Sports Hall; Attendance: closed to the public Referees: not available

3 September 2019 2	Cedevita Olimpija (Slovenia)	61–65	(Russia) Nizhny Novgorod	Kranjska Gora
20:30	Scoring by quarter: 12–16, 17–14, 19–17, 13– 18
	Pts: Blažič 16; Rebs: not available Asts: not available PIR: not available	Boxscore	Pts: not available Rebs: not available Asts: not available PIR: not available	Arena: Vitranc Sports Hall; Attendance: closed to the public Referees: not available

6 September 2019 3^{MDM}	Cedevita Olimpija (Slovenia)	92–88(OT)	(Turkey) Gaziantep	Sarajevo
17.00	Scoring by quarter: 17–18, 19–27, 23–17, 26–23, Overtime: 7–3
	Pts: Boatright 26; Rebs: not available Asts: not available PIR: not available	Boxscore	Pts: Jelovac 23; Rebs: not available Asts: not available PIR: not available	Arena: Mirza Delibašić Hall; Attendance: not available Referees: not available

7 September 2019 4^{MDM}	Budućnost VOLI (Montenegro)	70–79	(Slovenia) Cedevita Olimpija	Sarajevo
20.00	Scoring by quarter: 16–33, 14–10, 13–27, 21–9
	Pts: Bamforth 21; Rebs: not available Asts: not available PIR: not available	Boxscore	Pts: Miller-McIntyre 20; Rebs: not available Asts: not available PIR: not available	Arena: Mirza Delibašić Hall; Attendance: not available Referees: not available

11 September 2019 5	Cedevita Olimpija (Slovenia)	69–64	(Germany) ratiopharm Ulm	Ljubljana
18.30	Scoring by quarter: 18–26, 19–21, 13–10, 19–11
Šport TV	Pts: Miller-McIntyre 15; Rebs: three players 6 Asts: not available PIR: not available	Boxscore	Pts: Dragić 16; Rebs: not available Asts: not available PIR: not available	Arena: Tivoli Hall; Attendance: not available Referees: Milan Nedović, Blaž Zupančič, Milan Španić

14 September 2019 6^{DIT}	Cedevita Olimpija (Slovenia)	89–77	(Italy) Vanoli Cremona	Desio
19:00	Scoring by quarter: 28–23, 15–18, 25–16, 21–20
	Pts: Blažič 20; Rebs: Blažič, Krampelj 7 Asts: Hopkins 5 PIR: not available	Boxscore	Pts: Mathews 16; Rebs: not available Asts: not available PIR: not available	Arena: PalaDesio; Attendance: not available Referees: not available

15 September 2019 7^{DIT}	Acqua S.Bernardo Cantù (Italy)	84–78	(Slovenia) Cedevita Olimpija	Desio
19:30	Scoring by quarter: 21–14, 22–29, 21–25, 20–10
	Pts: Pecchia 17; Rebs: not available Asts: not available PIR: not available	Boxscore	Pts: Miller-McIntyre 21; Rebs: Murić 8 Asts: not available PIR: not available	Arena: PalaDesio; Attendance: not available Referees: not available

21 September 2019 8	Cedevita Olimpija (Slovenia)	76–63	(Slovenia) Šentjur	Ljubljana
20:00	Scoring by quarter: 27–19, 16–8, 19–21, 14–15
	Pts: Blažič 22; Rebs: Hopkins 12; Asts: Boatright 5 PIR: not available	Boxscore	Pts: not available Rebs: not available Asts: not available PIR: not available	Arena: Tivoli Hall; Attendance: closed to the public Referees: not available

15 January 2020 9	Cedevita Olimpija (Slovenia)	82–76	(Italy) Allianz Pallacanestro Trieste	Ljubljana
17:30	Scoring by quarter: 22–20, 24–19, 27–13, 9–24
	Pts: Hopkins 17; Rebs: not available Asts: not available PIR: not available	Boxscore	Pts: not available Rebs: not available Asts: not available PIR: not available	Arena: Arena Stožice; Attendance: closed to the public Referees: not available

22 January 2020 10	Cedevita Olimpija (Slovenia)	89–79	(Croatia) Zabok	Ljubljana
19:30	Scoring by quarter: 14–24, 31–17, 15–23, 29–15
	Pts: Krušlin 17; Rebs: not available Asts: not available PIR: not available	Boxscore	Pts: not available Rebs: not available Asts: not available PIR: not available	Arena: Arena Stožice (small hall); Attendance: closed to the public Referees: not available

Notes

- ^{MDM} Mirza Delibašić Memorial
- ^{DIT} Desio International Tournament

== Competitions ==
=== Overall ===
Competition	Started round	Final position / round	First match	Last match
Slovenian League	Matchday 1	Cancelled	February 26, 2020	March 10, 2020
Adriatic League	Matchday 1	Cancelled	October 4, 2019	March 9, 2020
EuroCup	Matchday 1	Matchday 10	October 2, 2019	December 18, 2019
Adriatic Supercup	Quarterfinals	Runners-up	September 26, 2019	September 29, 2019
Slovenian Cup	Quarterfinals 1	Runners-up	February 11, 2020	February 16, 2020

Updated to match played May 28, 2020
Source: Competitions

=== Overview ===
Competition	Record							
Competition	Pld	W	D	L	PF	PA	PD	Win %
Slovenian League	2	2	0	0	168	146	+22	100.00
Adriatic League	21	13	0	8	1,766	1,716	+50	61.90
EuroCup	10	4	0	6	799	812	−13	40.00
Adriatic Supercup	3	2	0	1	281	266	+15	66.67
Slovenian Cup	4	3	0	1	355	345	+10	75.00
Total	40	24	0	16	3,369	3,285	+84	60.00

Last updated: March 10, 2020
Source: Competitions

=== Slovenian League ===
The club will join the League in the second part of the 2019–20 season.

==== Championship group ====
Pos	Team	Pld	W	L	PF	PA	PD	Pts
1	Cedevita Olimpija	2	2	0	168	146	+22	4
2	Krka	3	1	2	224	236	−12	4
3	Hopsi Polzela	3	1	2	227	243	−16	4
4	Helios Suns	3	1	2	208	228	−20	4
5	Koper Primorska	2	1	1	154	132	+22	3

Source: KZS.si

==== Results summary ====
Overall						Home					Away				
Pld	W	L	PF	PA	PD	W	L	PF	PA	PD	W	L	PF	PA	PD
2	2	0	168	146	+22	1	0	86	77	+9	1	0	82	69	+13

Source: Competitive matches

==== Results by round ====
Round	1	2	3	4	5	6	7	8	9	10
Ground	H	H	A	H	A	A	A	H	A	H
Result	W	P	W	P	P	P	P	P	P	P
Position	–	–	–	–	–	–	–	–	–	–

Last updated: May 26, 2020.
Source: Competitive matches
Ground: A = Away; H = Home; R = Rest. Result: L = Loss; W = Win; R = Rest; P = Postponed.

Win Loss Void

==== Matches ====
26 February 2020 1	Cedevita Olimpija	86–77	Krka	Ljubljana
18.30	Scoring by quarter: 20–21, 24–26, 25–20, 17–10
Šport TV	Pts: Hopkins 26; Rebs: Krampelj 6 Asts: Miller-McIntyre 6 PIR: Hopkins 22	Boxscore	Pts: Balažič 15; Rebs: Jošilo, Lapornik 6 Asts: Cosey, Lapornik 5 PIR: Cosey 16	Arena: Arena Stožice; Attendance: 500; Referees: Damir Javor, Milan Španič, Blaž Smrekar

21 March 2020 2	Cedevita Olimpija	Void	Rogaška	Ljubljana
18.30
				Arena: Arena Stožice

10 March 2020 3	Helios Suns	69–82	Cedevita Olimpija	Domžale
18.45	Scoring by quarter: 21–18, 12–22, 18–26, 18–16
Šport TV	Pts: Mahkovic 23; Rebs: Konjević 5 Asts: Mahkovic, Oman, Pelko 4 PIR: Mahkovic 32	Boxscore	Pts: Blažič 17; Rebs: Murić 9 Asts: Miller-McIntyre 7 PIR: Artis 23	Arena: Komunalni center Hall; Attendance: closed to the public Referees: Marko Vučković, Tine Škrbec, Žiga Rener

17 March 2020 4	Cedevita Olimpija	Void	Hopsi Polzela	Ljubljana
18.30
				Arena: Arena Stožice

28 March 2020 5	Koper Primorska	Void	Cedevita Olimpija	Koper
18.00
				Arena: Arena Bonifika

4 April 2020 6	Krka	Void	Cedevita Olimpija	Novo Mesto
18.45
				Arena: Leon Štukelj Hall

11 April 2020 7	Rogaška	Void	Cedevita Olimpija	Rogaška Slatina
19.00
				Arena: Sports Hall Rogaška Slatina

15 April 2020 8	Cedevita Olimpija	Void	Helios Suns	Ljubljana
18.30
				Arena: Arena Stožice

18 April 2020 9	Hopsi Polzela	Void	Cedevita Olimpija	Polzela
19.00
				Arena: Sports Hall Polzela

21 April 2020 10	Cedevita Olimpija	Void	Koper Primorska	Ljubljana
18.30
				Arena: Arena Stožice

=== Adriatic League ===
==== Regular season ====
Pos	Team	Pld	W	L	PF	PA	PD	Pts
2	(Montenegro) Budućnost VOLI	21	15	6	1713	1517	+196	36
3	(Serbia) Crvena zvezda mts	21	14	7	1758	1562	+196	35
4	(Slovenia) Cedevita Olimpija	21	13	8	1766	1716	+50	34
5	(Montenegro) Mornar	21	13	8	1774	1754	+20	34
6	(Slovenia) Koper Primorska	21	12	9	1640	1687	−47	33

Source: Adriatic League

==== Results summary ====
Overall						Home					Away				
Pld	W	L	PF	PA	PD	W	L	PF	PA	PD	W	L	PF	PA	PD
21	13	8	1766	1716	+50	8	3	924	859	+65	5	5	842	857	−15

Source: Competitive matches

==== Results by round ====
Round	1	2	3	4	5	6	7	8	9	10	11	12	13	14	15	16	17	18	19	20	21	22
Ground	A	H	A	H	A	A	H	A	H	A	H	H	A	H	A	H	H	A	H	A	H	A
Result	W	W	W	W	L	W	W	L	W	L	W	W	W	L	L	L	L	W	W	L	W	P
Position	2	1	2	1	3	2	2	2	2	3	3	3	3	3	3	4	4	4	4	4	4	–

Last updated: May 28, 2020.
Source: Competitive matches
Ground: A = Away; H = Home; R = Rest. Result: L = Loss; W = Win; R = Rest; P = Postponed.

Win Loss Void

==== Matches ====
4 October 2019 1	Mega Bemax (Serbia)	63–87	(Slovenia) Cedevita Olimpija	Belgrade
20:00	Scoring by quarter: 8– 16, 24– 25, 17–20, 14– 26
Arena Sport	Pts: Simonović 12; Rebs: Atić 13; Asts: Čarapić 3 PIR: Atić, Simonović 13	Boxscore	Pts: Simonović 24; Rebs: Miller-McIntyre 10; Asts: Blažič 6 PIR: Simonović 28	Arena: Ranko Žeravica Sports Hall; Attendance: 1950; Referees: Josip Radojković, Vladan Šundić, Krunoslav Peić

13 October 2019 2	Cedevita Olimpija (Slovenia)	79–70	(Croatia) Cibona	Ljubljana
17:00	Scoring by quarter: 21–14, 21–17, 15–17, 22–22
TV3 Slovenija	Pts: Miller-McIntyre 24; Rebs: Stipanović 12; Asts: Miller-McIntyre 6 PIR: Miller-McIntyre 26	Boxscore	Pts: Vucić 17; Rebs: Ramljak, Vucić 6 Asts: Rebec 9 PIR: Vucić 17	Arena: Arena Stožice; Attendance: 2350; Referees: Tomislav Hordov, Milivoje Jovčić, Igor Dragojević

19 October 2019 3	Igokea (Bosnia and Herzegovina)	90– 95(OT)	(Slovenia) Cedevita Olimpija	Laktaši
20:00	Scoring by quarter: 27–15, 13–24, 14–13, 17–19, Overtime: 19–24
TV3 Slovenija#BBF3BB	Pts: Evans 20; Rebs: Stević 11; Asts: Evans 6 PIR: Evans 18	Boxscore	Pts: Blažič 30; Rebs: Simonović 7 Asts: Boatright 4 PIR: Blažič 38	Arena: Laktaši Sports Hall; Attendance: 2100; Referees: Matej Boltauzer, Ivan Stefanović, Gordan Terlević

26 October 2019 4	Cedevita Olimpija (Slovenia)	85–69	(Serbia) Partizan NIS	Ljubljana
18:00	Scoring by quarter: 24–21, 19–18, 15–18, 27–12
Arena Sport	Pts: Miller-McIntyre, Simonović 15; Rebs: Zirbes 9 Asts: Miller-McIntyre 7 PIR: Stipanović, Zirbes 19	Boxscore	Pts: Gordić 13; Rebs: Walden 6 Asts: Jaramaz, Thomas 3 PIR: Gordić, Walden 11	Arena: Arena Stožice; Attendance: 4000; Referees: Ilija Belošević, Miloš Koljenšić, Dragan Porobić

2 November 2019 5	Mornar (Montenegro)	77–70	(Slovenia) Cedevita Olimpija	Bar
18.00	Scoring by quarter: 15–22, 14–20, 27–14, 21–14
Arena Sport	Pts: Pullen 17; Rebs: Markota, Needham 5 Asts: Raley-Ross 4 PIR: Raley-Ross 18	Boxscore	Pts: Miller-McIntyre 14; Rebs: Stipanović 7 Asts: Miller-McIntyre, Stipanović 3 PIR: Hopkins, Stipanović 13	Arena: Topolica Sport Hall; Attendance: 2350; Referees: Milan Nedović, Vladan Šundić, Branislav Mrdak

10 November 2019 6	Koper Primorska (Slovenia)	67–90	(Slovenia) Cedevita Olimpija	Koper
20.00	Scoring by quarter: 13–30, 16–17, 23–23, 15–20
TV3 Slovenija	Pts: Čakarun 14; Rebs: Jagodić-Kuridža 6 Asts: Šiško 7 PIR: Čakarun 20	Boxscore	Pts: Miller-McIntyre 15; Rebs: Murić 5 Asts: Miller-McIntyre 9 PIR: Miller-McIntyre 22	Arena: Arena Bonifika; Attendance: 2500; Referees: Saša Pukl, Matej Boltauzer, Jakub Zamojski

16 November 2019 7	Cedevita Olimpija (Slovenia)	93–89	(Serbia) FMP	Ljubljana
20.00	Scoring by quarter: 21–19, 24–20, 28–24, 20–26
TV3 Slovenija	Pts: Miller-McIntyre 21; Rebs: Hopkins 10; Asts: Miller-McIntyre 7 PIR: Miller-McIntyre 27	Boxscore	Pts: Đorđević 17; Rebs: Đorđević 5 Asts: Đoković 8 PIR: Đorđević 22	Arena: Arena Stožice; Attendance: 1800; Referees: Damir Javor, Sašo Petek, Uroš Nikolić

24 November 2019 8	Zadar (Croatia)	101–63	(Slovenia) Cedevita Olimpija	Zadar
20.00	Scoring by quarter: 21–11, 24–15, 27–15, 29–22
TV3 Slovenija	Pts: Ivanov 22; Rebs: Fundić 10; Asts: Ivanov, Junaković, Mavra 4 PIR: Gilbert 26	Boxscore	Pts: Boatright, Miller-McIntyre, Simonović 11; Rebs: Simonović 6 Asts: Boatright, Stipanović 2 PIR: Simonović 13	Arena: Krešimir Ćosić Hall; Attendance: 3000; Referees: Sreten Radović, Uroš Obrknežević, Mario Majkić

1 December 2019 9	Cedevita Olimpija (Slovenia)	75–64	(Serbia) Crvena zvezda mts	Ljubljana
17.00	Scoring by quarter: 14–16, 21–16, 18–16, 22–16
Arena Sport	Pts: Boatright 17; Rebs: Miller-McIntyre 8 Asts: Boatright, Murić, Stipanović 3 PIR: Boatright 24	Boxscore	Pts: L. Brown 17; Rebs: Ognjen Kuzmić 5 Asts: L. Brown 5 PIR: L. Brown 18	Arena: Arena Stožice; Attendance: 5000; Referees: Ilija Belošević, Saša Pukl, Marko Juras

7 December 2019 10	Budućnost VOLI (Montenegro)	93–80	(Slovenia) Cedevita Olimpija	Podgorica
18.00	Scoring by quarter: 26–23, 28–18, 24–22, 15–17
Arena Sport	Pts: Cobbs 20; Rebs: Martin 9 Asts: Ivanović 7 PIR: Ivanović 26	Boxscore	Pts: Blažič 19; Rebs: Blažič 7 Asts: Miller-McIntyre 5 PIR: Blažič 25	Arena: Morača Sports Center; Attendance: 4120; Referees: Tomislav Hordov, Josip Radojković, Denis Hadžić

15 December 2019 11	Cedevita Olimpija (Slovenia)	72–56	(Slovenia) Krka	Ljubljana
20.00	Scoring by quarter: 13–15, 27–16, 18–15, 14–10
TV3 Slovenija	Pts: Simonović 16; Rebs: Hopkins 12; Asts: Boatright 5 PIR: Hopkins 22	Boxscore	Pts: Cosey 17; Rebs: Jones 9 Asts: Rakićević 4 PIR: Jones 23	Arena: Arena Stožice; Attendance: 1250; Referees: Jakub Zamojski, Dragan Porobić, Krunoslav Peić

21 December 2019 12	Cedevita Olimpija (Slovenia)	112–102(OT)	(Serbia) Mega Bemax	Ljubljana
17.00	Scoring by quarter: 21–15, 21–33, 23–23, 22–16, Overtime: 25–15
Arena Sport	Pts: Blažič 33; Rebs: Blažič 9 Asts: Miller-McIntyre 7 PIR: Blažič 48	Boxscore	Pts: Perry 27; Rebs: Simonović 16; Asts: Atić, Perry 5 PIR: Simonović 32	Arena: Tivoli Hall; Attendance: 1500; Referees: Sreten Radović, Radoš Arsenijević, Ivan Stefanović

29 December 2019 13	Cibona (Croatia)	82–84	(Slovenia) Cedevita Olimpija	Zagreb
12.00	Scoring by quarter: 17–26, 21–13, 24–22, 20–23
TV3 Slovenija	Pts: Gibson 20; Rebs: Vucić 6 Asts: Katić 8 PIR: Gibson 20	Boxscore	Pts: Boatright 17; Rebs: Hopkins 9 Asts: Blažič, Boatright, Miller-McIntyre 5 PIR: Blažič 18	Arena: Dražen Petrović Basketball Hall; Attendance: 2100; Referees: Damir Javor, Gordan Terlević, Matej Špendl

5 January 2020 14	Cedevita Olimpija (Slovenia)	78–85	(Bosnia and Herzegovina) Igokea	Ljubljana
12.00	Scoring by quarter: 28–25, 21–21, 14–19, 15–20
TV3 Slovenija	Pts: Miller-McIntyre 22; Rebs: Hopkins 10; Asts: Miller-McIntyre 5 PIR: Miller-McIntyre 23	Boxscore	Pts: Lešić 27; Rebs: Lešić 8 Asts: Green 11; PIR: Lešić 31	Arena: Arena Stožice; Attendance: 1500; Referees: Uroš Obrknežević, Dragan Porobić, Branislav Mrdak

11 January 2020 15	Partizan NIS (Serbia)	96–95	(Slovenia) Cedevita Olimpija	Belgrade
19.00	Scoring by quarter: 23–25, 32–22, 26–22, 15–26
TV3 Slovenija	Pts: Jaramaz 16; Rebs: Zagorac 6 Asts: Gordić, Jaramaz 6 PIR: Jaramaz 23	Boxscore	Pts: Blažič 22; Rebs: Blažič 11; Asts: Boatright 4 PIR: Blažič 24	Arena: Štark Arena; Attendance: 8670; Referees: Ilija Belošević, Uroš Nikolić, Denis Hadžić

18 January 2020 16	Cedevita Olimpija (Slovenia)	90–91(OT)	(Montenegro) Mornar	Ljubljana
17.00	Scoring by quarter: 23–18, 20–26, 20–19, 16–16, Overtime: 11–12
Arena Sport	Pts: Miller-McIntyre 23; Rebs: Hopkins 9 Asts: Miller-McIntyre 4 PIR: Miller-McIntyre 23	Boxscore	Pts: Needham 22; Rebs: Luković 12; Asts: Pullen 7 PIR: Luković 17	Arena: Arena Stožice; Attendance: 1250; Referees: Tomislav Hordov, Miloš Koljenšić, Ivan Stefanović

26 January 2020 17	Cedevita Olimpija (Slovenia)	69–72	(Slovenia) Koper Primorska	Ljubljana
18.00	Scoring by quarter: 19–23, 17–14, 22–18, 11–17
Arena Sport	Pts: Blažič 14; Rebs: Hopkins 9 Asts: Miller-McIntyre 9 PIR: Miller-McIntyre 19	Boxscore	Pts: Hodžić 16; Rebs: Luković, Marinković 7 Asts: Barič 5 PIR: Hodžić 16	Arena: Arena Stožice; Attendance: 1000; Referees: Matej Boltauzer, Sašo Petek, Radoš Arsenijević

1 February 2020 18	FMP (Serbia)	100–105(OT)	(Slovenia) Cedevita Olimpija	Belgrade
19.00	Scoring by quarter: 26–29, 16–22, 22–20, 26–19, Overtime: 10–15
TV3 Slovenija	Pts: Ulubay 26; Rebs: Reath 8 Asts: Pot, Radanov 5 PIR: Ulubay 24	Boxscore	Pts: Blažič 27; Rebs: Simonović 7 Asts: Miller-McIntyre 11; PIR: Blažič 32	Arena: Železnik Hall; Attendance: 1200; Referees: Miloš Koljenšić, Igor Dragojević, Radoš Savović

8 February 2020 19	Cedevita Olimpija (Slovenia)	90–82	(Croatia) Zadar	Ljubljana
18.00	Scoring by quarter: 22–28, 25–22, 25–15, 18–17
Arena Sport	Pts: Blažič 30; Rebs: Hopkins 10; Asts: Miller-McIntyre 5 PIR: Blažič 35	Boxscore	Pts: Ivanov 18; Rebs: Ahmed, Vuković 6 Asts: Mavra 7 PIR: Ivanov 19	Arena: Arena Stožice; Attendance: 2500; Referees: Damir Javor, Denis Hadžić, Krunoslav Peić

1 March 2020 20	Crvena zvezda mts (Serbia)	88–73	(Slovenia) Cedevita Olimpija	Belgrade
21.00	Scoring by quarter: 28–11, 18–17, 18–20, 24–25
Arena Sport	Pts: Jagodić-Kuridža 18; Rebs: Štimac 8 Asts: Brown 4 PIR: Jagodić-Kuridža 19	Boxscore	Pts: Hopkins 18; Rebs: Blažič, Hopkins 8 Asts: Miller-McIntyre 5 PIR: Blažič, Hopkins 16	Arena: Aleksandar Nikolić Hall; Attendance: 4857; Referees: Ilija Belošević, Tomislav Hordov, Mario Majkić

9 March 2020 21	Cedevita Olimpija (Slovenia)	81–79	(Montenegro) Budućnost VOLI	Ljubljana
19.00	Scoring by quarter: 18–18, 20–20, 17–21, 26 –20
TV3 Slovenija	Pts: Miller-McIntyre 17; Rebs: Blažič 14; Asts: Miller-McIntyre 4 PIR: Blažič 18	Boxscore	Pts: Ivanović 19; Rebs: Kilpatrick, Martin, Meiers 5 Asts: Cobbs 4 PIR: Cobbs 21	Arena: Arena Stožice; Attendance: closed to the public Referees: Milivoje Jovčić, Uroš Nikolić, Josip Radojković

14 March 2020 22	Krka (Slovenia)	Void	(Slovenia) Cedevita Olimpija	Novo Mesto
20.00
				Arena: Leon Štukelj Hall; Attendance: closed to the public
Note: Postponed due to the COVID-19 pandemic. Cancelled on 27 May.

=== EuroCup ===
==== Regular season ====
Pos	Team	Pld	W	L	PF	PA	PD	Qualification
1	(Russia) UNICS	10	6	4	783	775	+8	Advance to Top 16
2	(Italy) Germani Brescia Leonessa	10	6	4	705	725	−20	Advance to Top 16
3	(Turkey) Darüşşafaka Tekfen	10	5	5	746	708	+38	Advance to Top 16
4	(Spain) Joventut	10	5	5	838	834	+4	Advance to Top 16
5	(France) Nanterre 92	10	4	6	792	809	−17	
6	(Slovenia) Cedevita Olimpija	10	4	6	799	812	−13	

Source: EuroCup Basketball
Rules for classification: All points scored in extra period(s) were not counted in the standings, nor for any tie-break situation.

==== Results summary ====
Overall						Home					Away				
Pld	W	L	PF	PA	PD	W	L	PF	PA	PD	W	L	PF	PA	PD
10	4	6	799	812	−13	3	2	417	391	+26	1	4	382	421	−39

Source: Competitive matches

==== Results by round ====
Round	1	2	3	4	5	6	7	8	9	10
Ground	H	A	A	H	A	A	H	H	A	H
Result	L	L	L	L	L	W	W	W	L	W
Position	4	6	6	6	6	6	6	6	6	6

Last updated: December 18, 2019.
Source: Competitive matches
Ground: A = Away; H = Home; R = Rest. Result: L = Loss; W = Win; R = Rest; P = Postponed.

Win Loss

==== Matches ====
2 October 2019 1	Cedevita Olimpija (Slovenia)	73–79	(Turkey) Darüşşafaka Tekfen	Ljubljana
19:30 (CET)	Scoring by quarter: 24–12, 11–27, 24–24, 14–16
Šport TV	Pts: Miller-McIntyre 18; Rebs: Miller-McIntyre 6 Asts: Miller-McIntyre 6 PIR: Miller-McIntyre, Stipanović 22	Boxscore	Pts: Colson 16; Rebs: Colson, Hamilton 8 Asts: Browne 4 PIR: Hamilton 17	Arena: Arena Stožice; Attendance: 2400; Referees: Petri Mantyla, Aare Halliko, Clemens Fritz

9 October 2019 2	UNICS (Russia)	80–67	(Slovenia) Cedevita Olimpija	Kazan
19:00 (FET)	Scoring by quarter: 12–15, 26–20, 17–25, 25–7
Šport TV	Pts: Smith 21; Rebs: Kaimakoglou 9 Asts: Smith 6 PIR: Smith 29	Boxscore	Pts: Simonović 13; Rebs: Blažič 8 Asts: Stipanović 4 PIR: Simonović 15	Arena: Basket-Hall Kazan; Attendance: 3473; Referees: Borys Ryzhyk, Tomasz Trawicki, Arturas Sukys

16 October 2019 3	Germani Brescia Leonessa (Italy)	78–71	(Slovenia) Cedevita Olimpija	Brescia
20:45 (CET)	Scoring by quarter: 19–27, 20–19, 16–11, 23–14
Šport TV	Pts: Lansdowne 16; Rebs: Cain, Horton 8 Asts: Vitali 7 PIR: Horton, Vitali 16	Boxscore	Pts: Miller-McIntyre 21; Rebs: Simonović 9 Asts: Stipanović 4 PIR: Hopkins, Simonović 12	Arena: PalaLeonessa; Attendance: 2324; Referees: Spiros Gkontas, Jordi Aliaga, Nick Van den Broeck

23 October 2019 4	Cedevita Olimpija (Slovenia)	87–93	(France) Nanterre 92	Ljubljana
20:30 (CET)	Scoring by quarter: 21–28, 23–24, 23–19, 20–22
Šport TV	Pts: Simonović 21; Rebs: Zirbes 6 Asts: Boatright 5 PIR: Simonović 22	Boxscore	Pts: Moore 25; Rebs: Oliver 7 Asts: Bouquet 5 PIR: Cordinier 30	Arena: Arena Stožice; Attendance: 1114; Referees: Fernando Rocha, Ersan Kartal, Renaud Geller

30 October 2019 5	Joventut Badalona (Spain)	101–81	(Slovenia) Cedevita Olimpija	Badalona
20:45 (CET)	Scoring by quarter: 28–19, 33–22, 20–21, 20–19
Šport TV	Pts: Prepelič 17; Rebs: Kanter 11; Asts: Prepelič 7 PIR: Kanter 19	Boxscore	Pts: Miller-McIntyre 18; Rebs: Miller-McIntyre 4 Asts: Miller-McIntyre 6 PIR: Miller-McIntyre 26	Arena: Pavelló Olímpic de Badalona; Attendance: 2462; Referees: Petri Mantyla, Moritz Reiter, Eduard Udyanskyy

6 November 2019 6	Darüşşafaka Tekfen (Turkey)	72–76	(Slovenia) Cedevita Olimpija	Istanbul
20:15 (FET)	Scoring by quarter: 25–19, 14–27, 21–17, 12–13
Šport TV	Pts: Browne 17; Rebs: Jones 7 Asts: Browne 6 PIR: Browne 18	Boxscore	Pts: Krušlin 17; Rebs: Miller-McIntyre 10; Asts: Miller-McIntyre 9 PIR: Miller-McIntyre 25	Arena: Volkswagen Arena; Attendance: 2223; Referees: Emilio Perez, Petros Papapetrou, Clemens Fritz

13 November 2019 7	Cedevita Olimpija (Slovenia)	81–76	(Russia) UNICS	Ljubljana
18:30 (CET)	Scoring by quarter: 26–20, 15–11, 22–25, 18–20
Šport TV	Pts: Hopkins 20; Rebs: Blažič 6 Asts: Miller-McIntyre 4 PIR: Hopkins 19	Boxscore	Pts: Smith 26; Rebs: Kaimakoglou 7 Asts: Smith 5 PIR: Smith 25	Arena: Arena Stožice; Attendance: 1514; Referees: Ioannis Foufis, Arturas Sukys, Jordi Aliaga

20 November 2019 8	Cedevita Olimpija (Slovenia)	73–62	(Italy) Germani Brescia Leonessa	Ljubljana
18:30 (CET)	Scoring by quarter: 19–20, 19–6, 13–17, 22–19
Šport TV	Pts: Boatright, Miller-McIntyre 14; Rebs: Hopkins, Miller-McIntyre 7 Asts: Boatright 6 PIR: Boatright 19	Boxscore	Pts: Horton 13; Rebs: Cain 8 Asts: Vitali 6 PIR: Moss, Vitali 11	Arena: Arena Stožice; Attendance: 1863; Referees: Daniel Hierrezuelo, Gytis Vilius, Artem Lavrukhin

11 December 2019 9	Nanterre 92 (France)	90–87	(Slovenia) Cedevita Olimpija	Nanterre
20:45 (CET)	Scoring by quarter: 11–30, 21–13, 26–22, 32–22
Šport TV	Pts: Cordinier 23; Rebs: Oliver 6 Asts: Moore 5 PIR: Moore 22	Boxscore	Pts: Boatright 22; Rebs: Miller-McIntyre 7 Asts: Blažič, Boatright, Simonović 3 PIR: Miller-McIntyre 23	Arena: Palais des Sports Maurice Thorez; Attendance: 1630; Referees: Carlos Cortes, Renaud Geller, Semen Ovinov

18 December 2019 10	Cedevita Olimpija (Slovenia)	103–81	(Spain) Joventut Badalona	Ljubljana
18:30 (CET)	Scoring by quarter: 19–21, 32–17, 28–24, 24–19
Šport TV	Pts: Blažič 18; Rebs: Blažič, Murić 5 Asts: Miller-McIntyre 11; PIR: Blažič 30	Boxscore	Pts: Buford, Prepelič 14; Rebs: Kanter 5 Asts: Zisis 5 PIR: Dimitrijević 16	Arena: Arena Stožice; Attendance: 1301; Referees: Jurgis Laurinavicius, Michele Rossi, Sinan Isguder

=== Adriatic Supercup ===
The 2019 Adriatic Supercup was the 3rd season of the Adriatic cup tournament which was held in September 2019 in Zagreb, Croatia. Cedevita Olimpija lost to Partizan NIS in the final.

Win Loss

27 September 2019 Quarterfinals	Cedevita Olimpija (Slovenia)	101–92(OT)	(Serbia) FMP	Zagreb
17:00	Scoring by quarter: 26–20, 19–23, 27–25, 19–23, Overtime: 13–4
Arena Sport	Pts: Blažič 21; Rebs: Blažič 9 Asts: Boatright 8 PIR: Blažič 32	Boxscore	Pts: Jeremić 17; Rebs: Reath 11; Asts: Pot 7 PIR: Pecarski 19	Arena: Dražen Petrović Basketball Hall; Attendance: 500; Referees: Tomislav Hordov, Josip Radojković, Vladan Šundić

28 September 2019 Semifinals	Budućnost VOLI (Montenegro)	75–103	(Slovenia) Cedevita Olimpija	Zagreb
20:00	Scoring by quarter: 20–26, 26–24, 15–28, 14–25
Arena Sport	Pts: Cobbs 17; Rebs: Martin, Ilić 5 Asts: Cobbs 5 PIR: Cobbs 17	Boxscore	Pts: Boatright, Stipanović 15; Rebs: Murić, Blažič 6 Asts: Miller-McIntyre 7 PIR: Stipanović 26	Arena: Dražen Petrović Basketball Hall; Attendance: 300; Referees: Sašo Petek, Marko Juras, Igor Dragojević

28 September 2019 Final	Cedevita Olimpija (Slovenia)	77–99	(Serbia) Partizan NIS	Zagreb
20:00	Scoring by quarter: 20–20, 24–35, 29–29, 4–15
Arena Sport	Pts: Blažič 18; Rebs: Murić 7 Asts: Miller-McIntyre 8 PIR: Boatright 14	Boxscore	Pts: Jaramaz 20; Rebs: Peiners, Thomas 6 Asts: Gordić 8 PIR: Jaramaz 23	Arena: Dražen Petrović Basketball Hall; Attendance: 1000; Referees: Ilija Belošević, Tomislav Hordov, Milan Nedović

=== Slovenian Cup ===
The 2020 Slovenian Cup is the 29th season of the national cup tournament. The club joined the Cup in the quarterfinals.

Win Loss

11 February 2020 Quarterfinals 1	GGD Šenčur	77–85	Cedevita Olimpija	Šenčur
19:00	Scoring by quarter: 27–26, 20–22, 10–18, 20–19
YouTube	Pts: Popadić 22; Rebs: D. Murić 7 Asts: Rojc 4 PIR: Popadić 25	Boxscore	Pts: Blažič 25; Rebs: Hopkins 9 Asts: Miller-McIntyre 9 PIR: Blažič 26	Arena: Šenčur Sports Hall; Attendance: 400; Referees: Marko Vučković, Gašper Kolar, Miha Mauer

13 February 2020 Quarterfinals 2	Cedevita Olimpija	93–83 (178–160 agg.)	GGD Šenčur	Ljubljana
19:30	Scoring by quarter: 24–17, 24–31, 25–17, 20–18
YouTube	Pts: Marinković 18; Rebs: Marinković 10; Asts: Miller-McIntyre 9 PIR: Marinković 29	Boxscore	Pts: D. Murić 22; Rebs: D. Murić 12; Asts: Rojc 7 PIR: D. Murić 25	Arena: Kodeljevo Hall; Attendance: 500; Referees: Sašo Petek, Matej Špendl, Domen Krajnc

15 February 2020 Semifinals	Cedevita Olimpija	93–92(OT)	Krka	Ljubljana
18:30	Scoring by quarter: 19–20, 21–21, 20–29, 23–13, Overtime: 10–9
Šport TV	Pts: E. Murić 29; Rebs: E. Murić 11; Asts: Miller-McIntyre 12; PIR: E. Murić 37	Boxscore	Pts: Balažič 23; Rebs: Lapornik 8 Asts: Cosey 12; PIR: Balažič 22	Arena: Kodeljevo Hall; Attendance: 1,100; Referees: Mario Majkič, Milan Nedović, Matej Špendl

16 February 2020 Final	Koper Primorska	93–84	Cedevita Olimpija	Ljubljana
18:45	Scoring by quarter: 27–32, 23–14, 19–17, 24–21
Šport TV	Pts: Barič 22; Rebs: Lazić 10; Asts: Barič 7 PIR: Barič 26	Boxscore	Pts: Blažič 33; Rebs: Hopkins, Marinković, E. Murić 7 Asts: Miller-McIntyre 7 PIR: Blažič 25	Arena: Kodeljevo Hall; Attendance: 800; Referees: Boris Krejić, Marko Vučković, Blaž Zupančič

== Individual awards ==
=== Adriatic League ===
MVP of the Round

Round	Player	Eff.	Ref.
3	(Slovenia) Jaka Blažič	38	
12	(Slovenia) Jaka Blažič (2)	48	
18	(Slovenia) Jaka Blažič (3)	32	

=== Club Supporters ===
MVP of the Month

Month	Player	Ref.
2019
October	(Slovenia) Jaka Blažič	
November	(United States) Ryan Boatright	
December	(Slovenia) Jaka Blažič (2)	
2020
January	(Slovenia) Jaka Blažič (3)	

== Statistics ==
Legend
GP	Games played	GS	Games started	MPG	Minutes per game
FG%	Field-goal percentage	3FG%	3-point field-goal percentage	FT%	Free-throw percentage
RPG	Rebounds per game	APG	Assists per game	SPG	Steals per game
BPG	Blocks per game	PPG	Points per game	PIR	PIR per game

Player	Left during season

=== Slovenian League ===
Player	GP	GS	MPG	2FG%	3FG%	FT%	RPG	APG	SPG	BPG	PPG	PIR
Dominic Artis	2	0	25:18	.375	.571	.500	4.5	4.5	2.5	0.0	9.5	16.5
Jaka Blažič	2	2	26:25	.286	.500	.800	3.5	0.5	0.0	0.0	18.0	13.0
Domen Bratož	1	0	01:19	—	—	—	1.0	0.0	0.0	0.0	0.0	1.0
Mikael Hopkins	2	0	21:44	.588	.600	.727	5.0	0.5	0.0	1.0	18.5	17.5
Martin Krampelj	2	0	14:25	.500	.000	.500	3.5	0.5	0.5	0.0	3.0	3.0
Filip Krušlin	2	0	22:38	.000	.333	.500	1.0	6.0	0.4	0.0	3.5	4.0
Ivan Marinković	2	2	18:15	.833	—	.444	6.0	0.0	0.5	0.5	12.0	15.0
Codi Miller-McIntyre	2	2	27:12	.353	.333	—	2.5	6.5	0.5	0.0	8.0	6.5
Mirko Mulalić	2	2	16:53	.000	.000	—	1.0	1.0	0.0	0.0	0.0	0.0
Edo Murić	2	2	24:34	.714	.500	.667	5.5	1.5	0.0	0.5	11.5	15.0
Rok Radović	1	0	02:01	—	—	—	0.0	0.0	0.0	0.0	0.0	0.0
Andrija Stipanović	Did not play											
Petar Vujačić	1	0	01:47	—	—	—	0.0	0.0	0.0	0.0	0.0	0.0
Saša Zagorac	Did not play											
Maik Zirbes	Not added to the roster											

Last updated: February 16, 2020.
Source: KZS

=== Adriatic League ===
Player	GP	GS	MPG	2FG%	3FG%	FT%	RPG	APG	SPG	BPG	PPG	PIR
Dominic Artis	4	0	13.3	.571	.556	.800	1.3	2.3	1.3	0.0	6.8	9
Jaka Blažič	21	21	28.5	.521	.362	.804	5.6	2.7	1.1	0.0	15.1	17.9
Domen Bratož	1	0	0.3	0.	0.0	0.0	0.0	0.0	0.0	0.0	0.0	0.0
Mikael Hopkins	21	5	21.0	.540	.353	.778	6.5	0.6	0.4	0.9	9.2	10.7
Filip Krušlin	21	3	17.2	.478	.415	.706	1.6	0.7	0.4	0.0	6.0	5.2
Codi Miller-McIntyre	21	21	29.9	.516	.333	.765	3.8	5.1	1.1	0.0	14.0	15.3
Mirko Mulalić	17	0	12.9	.000	.414	.800	0.6	0.6	0.2	0.1	2.4	0.9
Edo Murić	21	18	22.0	.476	.355	.781	4.1	1.4	0.9	0.1	7.2	7.6
Andrija Stipanović	21	16	17.4	.574	.000	.556	3.4	1.5	0.3	0.3	6.1	6.4
Saša Zagorac	Did not play											
Maik Zirbes	20	5	13.9	.598	.000	.706	3.1	0.3	0.5	0.5	5.8	5.5
Ryan Boatright	13	0	22.5	.524	.338	.774	2.6	2.9	0.7	0.1	11.5	11.4
Martin Krampelj	Did not play											
Marko Simonović	19	16	26.7	.509	.333	.818	3.9	0.6	0.6	0.0	10.4	9
Petar Vujačić	1	0	0.9	0.	0.0	0.0	0.0	0.0	0.0	0.0	0.0	0.0

Last updated: March 9, 2020.
Source: Adriatic League

=== EuroCup ===
Player	GP	GS	MPG	2FG%	3FG%	FT%	RPG	APG	SPG	BPG	PPG	PIR
Jaka Blažič	10	10	27:30	.431	.220	.700	4.0	2.4	0.7	0.1	9.8	8.6
Ryan Boatright	10	1	22:27	.490	.237	0.850	1.8	2.5	0.8	0.0	11.1	8.9
Mikael Hopkins	10	0	19:01	.563	.381	.719	3.6	0.5	0.3	0.6	8.3	8.5
Filip Krušlin	10	1	18:34	.545	.432	.667	1.3	0.6	0.8	0.3	6.6	4.0
Codi Miller-McIntyre	10	9	29:44	.571	.276	.762	5.0	4.5	1.8	0.0	15.2	17.0
Mirko Mulalić	2	0	11:25	1.000	.333	1.000	0.0	1.0	0.0	0.0	5.0	4.5
Edo Murić	10	9	21:26	.600	.419	.667	3.6	1.1	1.3	0.2	8.5	9.1
Marko Simonović	10	10	22:19	.394	.500	.846	3.9	1.1	0.8	0.3	10.2	12.1
Andrija Stipanović	10	6	20:22	.523	.000	.250	3.7	2.1	0.5	0.4	5.0	6.1
Saša Zagorac	Did not play											
Maik Zirbes	10	4	16:14	.621	.000	.667	3.9	0.0	0.3	0.2	4.2	4.5
Martin Krampelj	Did not play											
Petar Vujačić	Did not play											

Last updated: December 18, 2019.
Source: EuroCup

=== ABA Super Cup ===
Player	GP	GS	MPG	2FG%	3FG%	FT%	RPG	APG	SPG	BPG	PPG	PIR
Jaka Blažič	3	3	29.3	.625	.417	.727	5.3	4.0	0.7	0.3	17.7	21.3
Ryan Boatright	3	0	23.8	.200	.611	.833	1.7	3.7	1.3	0.0	15.0	15.7
Mikael Hopkins	3	1	15.2	.545	.000	.333	3.3	0.0	0.3	1.0	4.3	1.3
Martin Krampelj	3	0	2.8	.000	.000	.000	0.0	0.0	0.3	0.0	0.0	-0.7
Filip Krušlin	3	1	17.6	.000	.500	1.000	0.0	0.3	0.7	0.0	4.7	1.3
Codi Miller-McIntyre	3	3	29.7	.567	.125	1.000	4.0	5.0	1.7	0.0	14.3	15.3
Mirko Mulalić	3	1	14.3	1.000	.556	.000	0.7	1.0	0.0	0.3	5.7	5.0
Edo Murić	3	1	25.3	.333	.417	.000	5.3	0.7	0.3	0.0	7.0	6.7
Marko Simonović	3	2	25.1	.500	.412	.769	4.3	2.0	1.0	0.0	13.7	15.3
Andrija Stipanović	3	3	24.0	.650	.000	.615	5.7	2.3	0.3	0.0	11.3	15.0
Petar Vujačić	1	0	4.0	.000	.000	.000	0.0	1.0	0.0	0.0	0.0	0.0
Saša Zagorac	Did not play											
Maik Zirbes	Did not play											

Last updated: September 28, 2019.
Source: ABA League

=== Slovenian Cup ===
Player	GP	GS	MPG	2FG%	3FG%	FT%	RPG	APG	SPG	BPG	PPG	PIR
Dominic Artis	3	0	11:31	.400	.333	.000	1.7	1.7	0.3	0.0	2.3	3.3
Jaka Blažič	4	4	29:02	.520	.394	.905	3.5	2.8	1.0	0.3	21.0	16.0
Domen Bratož	2	0	0:54	.000	.000	.000	0.5	0.0	0.0	0.0	0.0	0.0
Mikael Hopkins	4	4	25:54	.682	.333	.917	7.8	3.0	1.3	0.3	11.0	19.0
Martin Krampelj	1	0	5:25	.000	.000	.000	2.0	0.0	0.0	0.0	0.0	0.0
Filip Krušlin	4	0	20:12	.000	.583	1.000	2.0	0.8	0.3	0.0	11.3	10.8
Ivan Marinković	4	4	27:21	.606	.000	.250	6.3	1.0	0.0	0.5	10.3	12.8
Codi Miller-McIntyre	4	4	30:30	.548	.333	.727	4.3	9.3	1.3	0.3	12.8	19.8
Mirko Mulalić	4	0	18:16	.167	.000	.800	1.8	1.5	0.0	0.0	1.5	0.0
Edo Murić	4	4	32:21	.783	.313	.833	6.3	1.0	1.0	0.3	15.3	17.8
Marko Simonović	1	0	19:33	.000	.000	.500	3.0	0.0	1.0	0.0	2.0	0.0
Andrija Stipanović	Did not play											
Petar Vujačić	1	0	2:37	.000	.500	.000	0.0	0.0	0.0	0.0	3.0	2.0
Saša Zagorac	3	0	8:50	.500	.600	.000	1.3	0.3	0.0	0.0	3.7	3.0
Maik Zirbes	Not added to the roster											

Last updated: February 16, 2020.
Source: KZS

=== Head coaches records ===
Head Coach	Competition	G	W	L	PF	PA	PD	Win %
(Croatia) Slaven Rimac	Adriatic League	17	10	7	1417	1367	+50	.588
(Croatia) Slaven Rimac	EuroCup	10	4	6	799	812	-13	.400
(Croatia) Slaven Rimac	Adriatic Supercup	3	2	1	281	266	+15	.667
(Croatia) Slaven Rimac	Total	30	16	14	2497	2445	+52	.533
(Slovenia) Jurica Golemac	Slovenian League	2	2	0	168	146	+22	1.000
(Slovenia) Jurica Golemac	Adriatic League	4	3	1	349	349	0	.750
(Slovenia) Jurica Golemac	Slovenian Cup	4	3	1	355	345	+10	.750
(Slovenia) Jurica Golemac	Total	10	8	2	872	840	+32	.800

Updated: March 10, 2020

== See also ==
- 2019–20 KK Crvena zvezda season
- 2019–20 KK Partizan season
