= 2019 ABA League Supercup =

Basketball competition

Tournament details
- Dates: 26–29 September
- Season: 2019–20
- Teams: 8
- Defending champions: (Serbia) Crvena zvezda mts

Final positions
- Champions: (Serbia) Partizan NIS
- Runners-up: (Slovenia) Cedevita Olimpija

Tournament statistics
- Matches played: 7

Awards
- Best player: (United States) Rashawn Thomas
- All statistics correct as of September 29, 2019.

The 2019 ABA League Supercup was the 3rd tournament of the ABA League Supercup, featuring teams from the Adriatic League First Division.

== Qualified teams ==
Based on the results in the 2018–19 ABA League First Division season and the 2018–19 ABA League Second Division Champion there are 8 participants at the 2019 Adriatic Supercup. Qualified teams are the seven best placed teams of the First Division season and the Second Division Champion.

Pos.	Adriatic League First Division
1	(Serbia) Crvena zvezda mts
2	(Montenegro) Budućnost VOLI
3	(Slovenia) Cedevita Olimpija
4	(Serbia) Partizan NIS
5	(Serbia) Mega Bemax
6	(Serbia) FMP
7	(Croatia) Cibona (host)
ABA2	(Slovenia) Koper Primorska

== Venue ==
Zagreb	2019 ABA League Supercup (Yugoslavia)
Dražen Petrović Basketball Hall	2019 ABA League Supercup (Yugoslavia)
Capacity: 5,400	2019 ABA League Supercup (Yugoslavia)

== Bracket ==
Source: ABA League

Quarterfinals
27 September
2 (Montenegro) Budućnost VOLI	77
7 (Croatia) Cibona	71
27 September
3 (Slovenia) Cedevita Olimpija (OT)	101
6 (Serbia) FMP	92
26 September
4 (Serbia) Partizan NIS	86
5 (Serbia) Mega Bemax	73
26 September
1 (Serbia) Crvena zvezda mts	82
8 (Slovenia) Koper Primorska	88

Semifinals
28 September
(Montenegro) Budućnost VOLI	75
(Slovenia) Cedevita Olimpija	103
28 September
(Serbia) Partizan NIS	91
(Slovenia) Koper Primorska	77

Final
29 September
(Slovenia) Cedevita Olimpija	77
(Serbia) Partizan NIS	99

== Quarterfinals ==
=== Partizan NIS v Mega Bemax ===
26 September 2019
17:00

Boxsore

Partizan NIS (Serbia)	86–73	(Serbia) Mega Bemax
Scoring by quarter: 18–21, 28–12, 25–16, 15–24
Pts: Paige 21; Rebs: Thomas 7 Asts: Paige 4		Pts: Simonović 17; Rebs: Simonović 9 Asts: four players 3

Dražen Petrović Basketball Hall, Zagreb
Attendance: 500
Referees: Sašo Petek, Marko Juras, Igor Dragojević

=== Crvena zvezda mts v Koper Primorska ===
26 September 2019
20:00

Boxsore

Crvena zvezda mts (Serbia)	82–88	(Slovenia) Koper Primorska
Scoring by quarter: 26–25, 15–21, 21–23, 20–19
Pts: Davidovac 15; Rebs: Gist 6 Asts: Čović 5		Pts: Jagodić-Kuridža 18; Rebs: Jagodić-Kuridža 9 Asts: Šiško 7

Dražen Petrović Basketball Hall, Zagreb
Attendance: 800
Referees: Miloš Koljenšić, Dragan Porobić, Krunoslav Peić

=== Cedevita Olimpija v FMP ===
27 September 2019
17:00

Boxsore

Cedevita Olimpija (Slovenia)	101–92 (OT)	(Serbia) FMP
Scoring by quarter: 26–20, 19–23, 27–25, 16–20, Overtime: 13–4
Pts: Blažič 21; Rebs: Blažič 9 Asts: Boatright 8		Pts: Jeremić 17; Rebs: Reath 11; Asts: Pot 7

Dražen Petrović Basketball Hall, Zagreb
Attendance: 500
Referees: Tomislav Hordov, Josip Radojković, Vladan Šundić

=== Budućnost VOLI v Cibona ===
27 September 2019
20:30

Boxsore

Budućnost VOLI (Montenegro)	77–71	(Croatia) Cibona
Scoring by quarter: 17–16, 19–16, 13–22, 28–17
Pts: Bamforth 25; Rebs: Z. Nikolić 11; Asts: Cobbs 6		Pts: Vucić 16; Rebs: Rhett, Vucić 7 Asts: Rebec 6

Dražen Petrović Basketball Hall, Zagreb
Attendance: 500
Referees: Ilija Belošević, Mario Majkić, Milan Nedović

== Semifinals ==
=== Partizan NIS v Koper Primorska ===
28 September 2019
17:00

Boxsore

Partizan NIS (Serbia)	91–77	(Slovenia) Koper Primorska
Scoring by quarter: 19–22, 24–26, 23–14, 25–15
Pts: Thomas 19; Rebs: Thomas 12; Asts: Jaramaz, Gordić 4		Pts: Holt 17; Rebs: Jagodić-Kuridža 7 Asts: Šiško 5

Dražen Petrović Basketball Hall, Zagreb
Attendance: 450
Referees: Miloš Koljenšić, Mario Majkić, Vladan Šundić

=== Budućnost VOLI v Cedevita Olimpija ===
28 September 2019
20:00

Boxsore

Budućnost VOLI (Montenegro)	75–103	(Slovenia) Cedevita Olimpija
Scoring by quarter: 20–26, 26–24, 15–28, 14–25
Pts: Cobbs 17; Rebs: Martin, Ilić 5 Asts: Cobbs 5		Pts: Boatright 15; Rebs: Murić, Blažič 6 Asts: Miller-McIntyre 7

Dražen Petrović Basketball Hall, Zagreb
Attendance: 300
Referees: Sašo Petek, Marko Juras, Igor Dragojević

== Final ==
29 September 2019
20:00

Boxsore

Cedevita Olimpija (Slovenia)	77–99	(Serbia) Partizan NIS
Scoring by quarter: 20–20, 24–35, 29–29, 4–15
Pts: Blažič 18; Rebs: Murić 7 Asts: Miller-McIntyre 8		Pts: Jaramaz 20; Rebs: Thomas, Peiners 6 Asts: Gordić 8

Dražen Petrović Basketball Hall, Zagreb
Attendance: 1,000
Referees: Ilija Belošević, Tomislav Hordov, Milan Nedović

Starters:			Pts	Reb	Ast
PG	10	(United States) Codi Miller-McIntyre	11	3	8
G/F	11	(Slovenia) Jaka Blažič	18	1	2
SF	8	(Slovenia) Edo Murić	5	7	1
SF	19	(Serbia) Marko Simonović	11	3	11
C	13	(Bosnia and Herzegovina) Andrija Stipanović	8	5	2
Reserves:					
SG	2	(Croatia) Filip Krušlin	3	0	0
PG	3	(Armenia) Ryan Boatright	15	0	1
PF	4	(Slovenia) Martin Krampelj	0	0	0
PF	5	(United States) Mikael Hopkins	3	6	0
SG	7	(Slovenia) Petar Vujačić	DNP		
SG	9	(Slovenia) Mirko Mulalić	3	0	0
PF	17	(Slovenia) Saša Zagorac	DNP		
Head coach:
(Croatian Basketball Federation) Slaven Rimac

Cedevita Olimpija	Partizan

COL	Statistics	PAR
15/30 (50%)	2-pt field goals	25/36 (69%)
13/30 (43%)	3-pt field goals	12/27 (44%)
8/12 (67%)	Free throws	13/19 (68%)
3	Offensive rebounds	4
22	Defensive rebounds	24
25	Total rebounds	28
15	Assists	26
19	Turnovers	13
5	Steals	10
2	Blocks	2
23 (20)	Fouls	21(23)

Starters:			Pts	Reb	Ast
G	2	(United States) Corey Walden	13	0	6
G	10	(Serbia) Ognjen Jaramaz	20	2	5
SF	3	(Serbia) Rade Zagorac	6	3	1
PF	25	(United States) Rashawn Thomas	13	6	3
C	9	(Belarus) Artsiom Parakhouski	2	3	1
Reserves:					
G	5	(United States) Marcus Paige	6	1	1
G	7	(Bosnia and Herzegovina) Nemanja Gordić	12	1	8
PF	12	(Serbia) Novica Veličković	DNP		
PF	14	(Serbia) Stefan Birčević	0	2	0
F/C	21	(Serbia) Nikola Janković	11	4	0
G/F	31	(Latvia) Žanis Peiners	12	6	1
C	42	(United States) William Mosley	4	0	0
Head coach:
(Italian Basketball Federation) Andrea Trinchieri

== See also ==
- 2019–20 ABA League First Division
- 2019–20 KK Cedevita Olimpija season
- 2019–20 KK Crvena zvezda season
- 2019–20 KK Partizan season

== Notes ==
1. Cedevita Zagreb and Olimpija Ljubljana announce that they are about to found a new club based in Ljubljana under the name Cedevita Olimpija. Cedevita Olimpija will take the Cedevita Zagreb's spot in the League.
