= David Kralj =

Slovenian basketball player

KK Zlatorog Laško
- Position: Shooting guard / point guard
- League: Premier A Slovenian Basketball League

Personal information
- Born: 25 January 1999 (age 27) Ljubljana, Slovenia
- Listed height: 1.93 m (6 ft 4 in)
- Listed weight: 95 kg (209 lb)

Career information
- College: Coastal Carolina (2018–2019)
- Playing career: 2017–present

Career history
- 2017–2018: Union Olimpija
- 2017–2018: → LHT Castings
- 2019: Petrol Olimpija
- 2019: → Šenčur
- 2019–2020: Cedevita Olimpija
- 2019–2020: → Helios Suns
- 2020–2021: Šenčur
- 2021–2022: Leuven Bears
- 2022–present: KK Zlatorog Laško

David Kralj (born 25 January 1999) is a Slovenian professional basketball player for KK Zlatorog Laško of the Premier A Slovenian Basketball League. He played college basketball for the Coastal Carolina Chanticleers.

== Early career ==
Kralj played for the Petrol Olimpija youth teams. Over four 2017–18 Junior ABA League games, he averaged 6.4 points, 3.6 rebounds and 1.7 assists per game.

== College career ==
As a freshman, Kralj appeared in 16 games (including 6 starts) at the Coastal Carolina University in their 2018–19 season. In January 2019, he left Coastal Carolina to play professional basketball. Over the season, he averaged 7.5 points, 1.7 rebounds and 1.1 assists per game.

== Professional career ==
In October 2017, Kralj was loaned out to LHT Castings for the 2017–18 Slovenian League season. On 21 April, Kralj recorded career-high 54 points in a 106–102 win over Hopsi Polzela.

After leaving Coastal Carolina in January 2019, Kralj joined Petrol Olimpija. Kralj played only two February games for Olimpija, whereupon he was loaned out to Šenčur for the rest of the 2018–19 season.

Prior to the 2019–20 season, Kralj joined new Slovenian team Cedevita Olimpija. He joined Leuven Bears in 2021 and averaged 8.0 points, 2.8 rebounds, 1.5 assists and 1.2 steals per game. On February 14, 2022, Kralj parted ways with the team. He signed with KK Zlatorog Laško of the Premier A Slovenian Basketball League on March 3, 2022.

== National team career ==
Kralj was a member of the Slovenia national under-16 team at the 2015 FIBA U16 European Division B Championship in Sofia, Bulgaria. Over eight tournament games, he averaged 12.1 points, 4.0 rebounds and 1.6 assists per game.

Kralj was a member of the Slovenia national under-18 team at the 2016 FIBA U18 European Championship in Samsun, Turkey. Over five tournament games, he averaged 7.2 points, 2.6 rebounds and 0.8 assists per game. Also, he was a member of the under-18 team at the 2017 FIBA U18 European Championship in Slovakia. Over five tournament games, he averaged 14.7 points, 5.1 rebounds and 2.1 assists per game.

Kralj was a member of the Slovenia under-20 team that finished 12th at the 2019 FIBA U20 European Championship in Tel Aviv, Israel. Over seven tournament games, he averaged 16.2 points, 5.7 rebounds, and 3.2 assists per game.
