= Edo Murić =

Slovenian basketball player (born 1991)

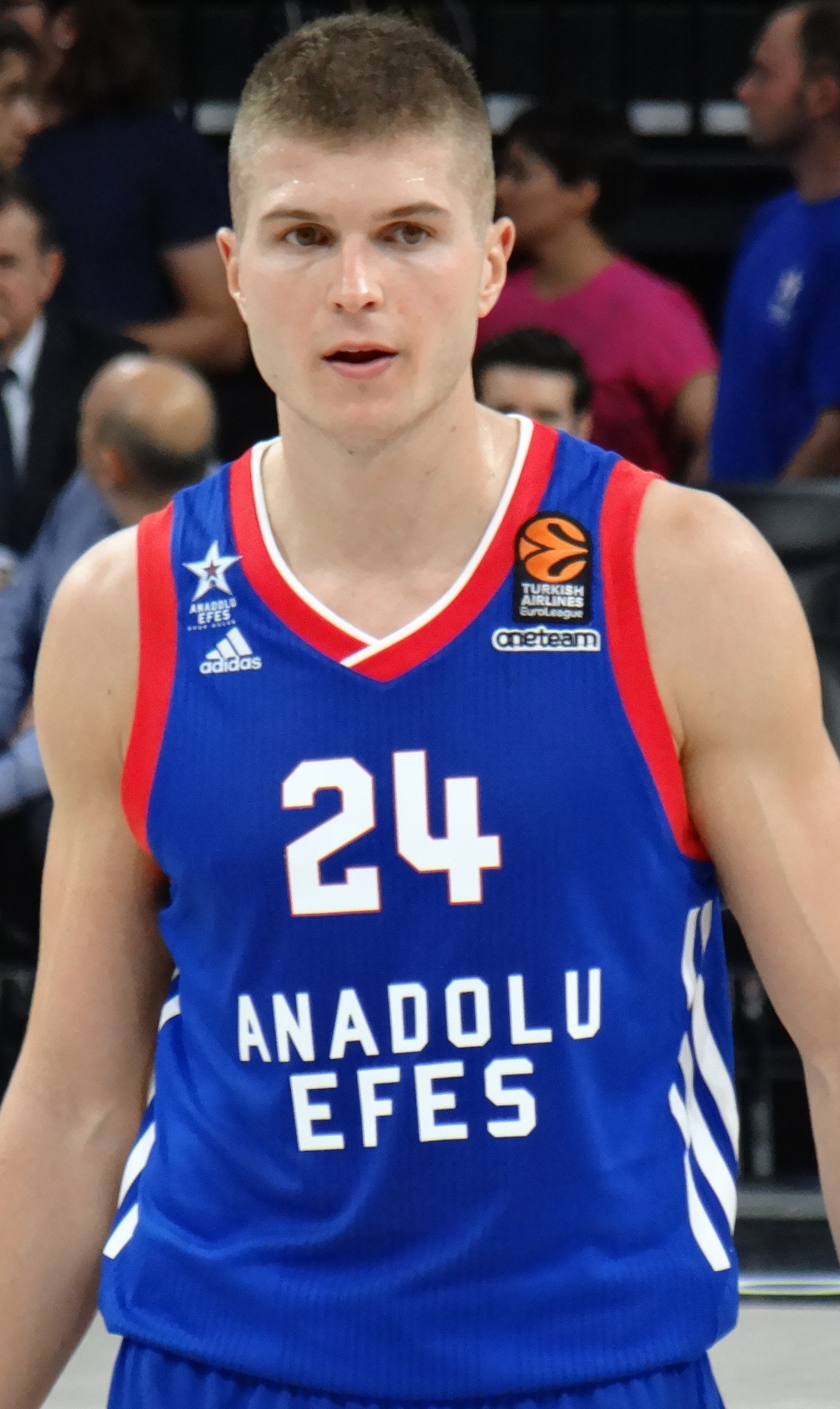
- Murić with Anadolu Efes in 2017

No. 8 – Ilirija
- Position: Small forward
- League: Slovenian League; ABA League

Personal information
- Born: 27 November 1991 (age 34) Ljubljana, Slovenia
- Listed height: 2.03 m (6 ft 8 in)
- Listed weight: 98 kg (216 lb)

Career information
- NBA draft: 2013: undrafted
- Playing career: 2008–present

Career history
- 2008–2010: Parklji
- 2008–2009: →Škofja Loka
- 2010–2014: Krka
- 2014–2016: Partizan
- 2016–2017: Banvit
- 2017: Anadolu Efes
- 2017–2018: Zielona Góra
- 2018–2019: Cedevita
- 2019–2024: Cedevita Olimpija
- 2024–2025: Força Lleida
- 2025–present: Ilirija

Career highlights
- EuroChallenge champion (2011); 8× Slovenian League champion (2011–2014, 2021–2024); 4× Slovenian Cup winner (2014, 2022–2024); Slovenian Cup MVP (2022); Turkish Cup winner (2017); Croatian Cup winner (2019); Slovenian Supercup winner (2020); 3× Slovenian All-Star (2012–2014); European Under-18 All-Star Game (2009)
Medals
Men's basketball
Representing Slovenia
EuroBasket
| Gold medal – first place | 2017 Finland–Israel–Romania–Turkey |

Edo Murić (born 27 November 1991) is a Slovenian professional basketball player for Ilirija of the Slovenian League and the ABA League. He also represents the Slovenian national team. Standing at 2.02 m (6 ft 8 in), he plays the small forward position.

== Professional career ==
Murić started playing basketball for Ljubljana-based team Parklji. In the season 2008–09 he was loaned to TCG Mercator for one season. In the 2009–10 season he returned to Parklji where he stayed until the summer of 2010.

=== Krka ===
In 2010, Murić signed a contract with the Slovenian team Krka. With Krka he won the 2010–11 FIBA EuroChallenge winning 83-77 in the final against Lokomotiv Kuban. In 17 games he averaged 4.9 points, 0.6 assists and 3.3 rebounds per game in the 2010–11 FIBA EuroChallenge. He played four seasons with Krka and won the EuroChallenge, Slovenian Basketball Cup and four times Slovenian League. The 2013–14 season was his last season with Krka and it was also his best season where averaged 13.4 points, 4.7 rebounds and 1.6 assists per game in ABA league.

=== NBA Summer League ===
He played for the Atlanta Hawks 2014 NBA Summer League team. On 12 July 2014, Murić played his first match in NBA Summer League, against Washington Wizards and scored 4 points in 5 minutes on the court. A day later, Edo Murić played his best game in the NBA Summer League against NBA D-League Select, where he scored 4 points and he had 4 rebounds.

=== Partizan ===
On 11 September 2014 Murić signed a three–year deal with the Serbian team Partizan Belgrade.

2014–15 season

On 26 September 2014, Murić made his debut for Partizan in a friendly match against EA7 Milano where he scored 29 points and was most effective player in that match. Murić has made his debut for Partizan in the ABA League against his former club Krka and scored 22 points on 8 October 2014. On 29 October 2014, he played his most efficient match in the Eurocup, against Hapoel Jerusalem; he scored 21 points. On 30 November 2014, in the match against Crvena zvezda, Murić was injured in a duel with his countryman Jaka Blažič and due to that injury he had to pause one month. In Eurocup he played 7 matches and he averaged 14 points, 4.1 rebounds and 2.4 assists per game, all career-high. Over 21 games in the ABA League, he averaged 11.3 points, 3.8 rebounds and 2 assists per game.

=== Turkey, Poland and Croatia ===
On 30 July 2016, Murić signed with Turkish club Banvit for the 2016–17 season.

On 13 September 2017, Murić signed a 1+1 contract with the Turkish club Anadolu Efes. On 16 December 2017, he parted ways with Efes.

On 30 December 2017, Murić signed with Polish club Stelmet Zielona Góra for the rest of the 2017–18 season. On 9 September 2018 Murić and Zielona Góra parted away.

On 16 December 2018, Murić signed with Croatian club Cedevita for the rest of the 2018–19 season.

On 8 July 2019, Murić signed a two-year contract with Slovenian club Cedevita Olimpija, as the first-ever player who signed with the club.

== Slovenian national team ==
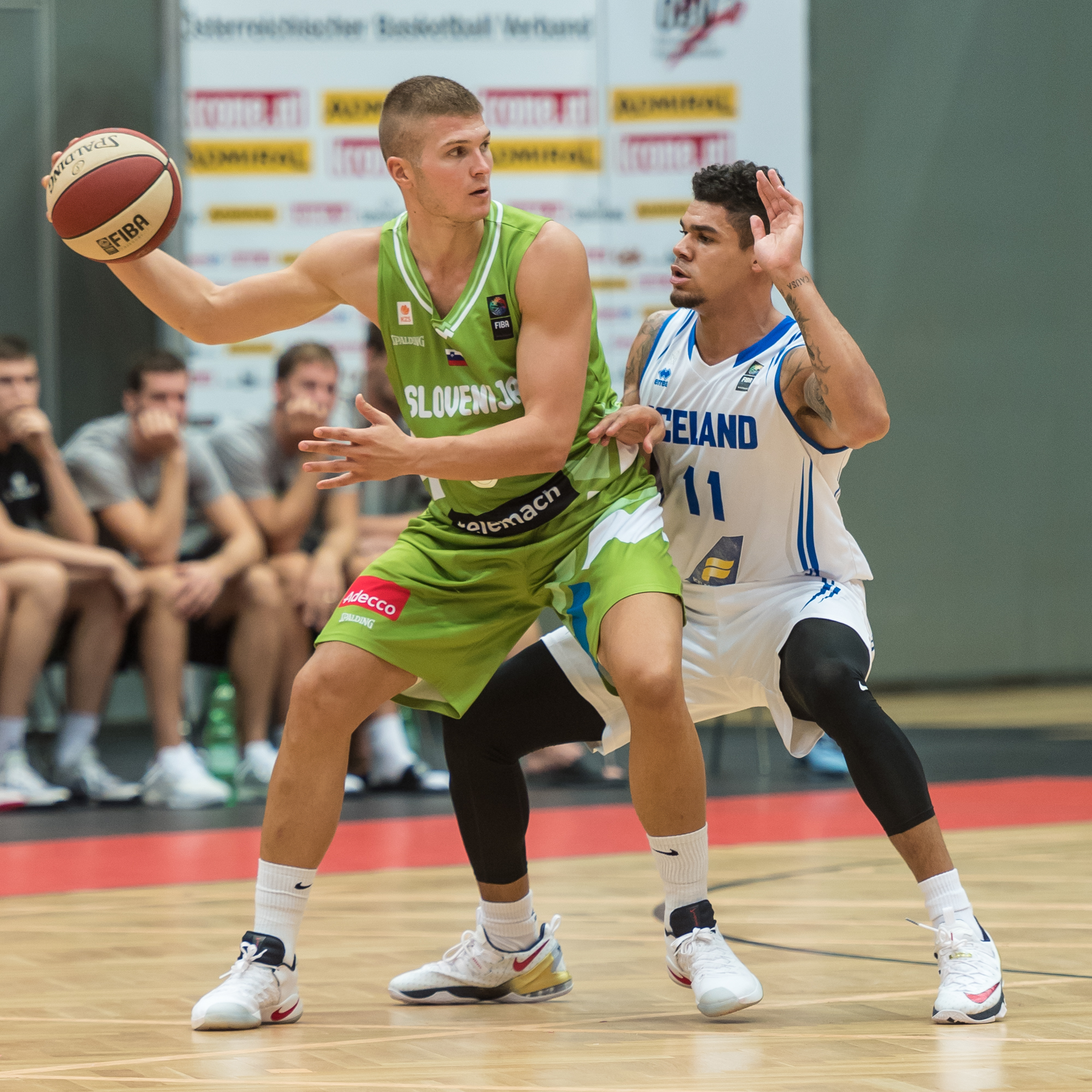
Murić (left) playing for Slovenia in a game against Iceland in 2016

Since 2011 Murić has been member of the senior men's Slovenian national basketball team.

Murić has played on EuroBasket 2011 in Lithuania. On 14 September 2011, Slovenia has stopped in quarterfinals by Spain with 86–64. Slovenia is in victory over Serbia take seventh place and in that match Murić has scored 8 points and had 3 rebounds. Over 11 tournament games, Murić averaged 2.7 points, 0.5 assists and 2.4 rebounds per game.

Murić has played on EuroBasket 2013 in Slovenia. Slovenia has take fifth place after victory over Ukraine 69–63 and Murić has scored 9 points and had 4 rebounds. On FIBA EuroBasket 2013, Murić has played 10 matches and averaged 3.4 points and 2.9 rebounds per game.

On World Cup 2014 in Spain, he has also been a member of Slovenian national basketball team which won seventh place. On 30 August 2014, in the first game of Group C, Slovenia has played against Australia and won with a score 80–90 and Murić has scored 5 points. In the first phase of the tournament, Slovenia dominated in the Group D with 4-1 record together with Lithuania. However, they were stopped in the semifinal game by United States with 76–119 and Edo Murić scored 6 points for almost 10 minutes on the court. Over 7 tournament games, Murić averaged 3.4 points and 2 rebounds per game on 46.2% shooting from the field and 25% from the three-point line.

Murić was part of the national team at the 2017 EuroBasket and 2020 Summer Olympics where Slovenia took gold and fourth place, respectively.

== Personal life ==
He was born in Ljubljana, Slovenia. His older brother Dino is also a professional basketball player. He is also a Bosnian-Slovene of Muslims (ethnic group) descent most likely from either Bosnia or southern Croatia and is a religious Muslim.
