= Marko Popadić =

Serbian basketball player (born 1989)

No. 11 – Gilbertina Soresina
- Position: Point guard
- League: C gold, Italy

Personal information
- Born: 30 August 1989 (age 37) Pančevo, SR Serbia, Yugoslavia
- Listed height: 1.90 m (6 ft 3 in)
- Listed weight: 85 kg (187 lb)

Career information
- NBA draft: 2011: undrafted
- Playing career: 2006–present

Career history
- 2006–2008: Crvena zvezda
- 2008–2009: Al Ittihad Tripoli
- 2009–2010: Smederevo 1953
- 2010–2011: Torrelodones
- 2011–2012: Tamiš
- 2012–2013: Smederevo 1953
- 2013–2014: SEFA Arkadikos
- 2014–2015: Egis Körmend
- 2015–2016: PVSK Veolia
- 2016: Clavijo
- 2016–2017: Holargos
- 2017–2018: Šentjur
- 2018–2020: Šenčur GGD
- 2020–2021: Terme Olimia Podčetrtek
- 2021–2022: Mladost SP, Gilbertina Soresina

Marko Popadić (Serbian Cyrillic: Марко Попадић; born 30 August 1989) is a Serbian professional basketball player for Gilbertina Soresina of the C gold, Italy.

== Professional career ==
A point guard, Popadić played for Crvena zvezda, Al Ittihad Tripoli, Tamiš, Smederevo 1953, SEFA Arkadikos, Egis Körmend, PVSK Veolia, Clavijo, Holargos, Šentjur, Šenčur GGD, Terme Olimia Podčetrtek, Mladost SP and Gilbertina Soresina.

== Personal life ==
His father Miša is a basketball coach, and his mother Vesna Popadić is retired handball player.
