= Šport TV (Slovenia) =

Slovenian sport television channel

- Type: Broadcast, television and online
- Country: Slovenia
- Owner: Šport TV - ASPN d.o.o.
- Launch date: October 14, 2006
- Official website: sport-tv.si

Šport TV (English: Sport TV) is Slovenia's first sport-only television channel. Based in the country's capital, Ljubljana. Television was launched on October 14, 2006. Miro Ćorić is editor-in-chief, Marko Bogovac is general manager.

== TV channels ==
- first channel: Šport TV 1 (Š1)
- second channel: Šport TV 2 (Š2)
- third channel: Šport TV 3 (Š3)

== Broadcasting competitions ==
Soccer:

- Copa del Rey
- A-League
- Czech First League
- Copa América
- AFC Asian Cup
- International Champions Cup
- Toulon Tournament
- UEFA European Championship qualifying

Ice hockey:

- Ice Hockey World Championships
- IIHF World Championship Division I
- Champions Hockey League
- Ice Hockey Federation of Slovenia championship
- Spengler Cup

Handball:

- EHF Champions League
- SEHA League
- Women's EHF Champions League
- Handball-Bundesliga
- DHB-Pokal

Basketball:

- Premier A Slovenian Basketball League
- Liga ACB
- Basketball Champions League
- FIBA Basketball World Cup
- Eurocup Basketball
- NCAA
- Copa del Rey de Baloncesto

Rugby:

- Six Nations Cup
- Pro14

Automoto:

- Motocross World Championship
- Red Bull Air Race World Championship
- Formula E
- Race of Champions

Triathlon:

- ITU World Triathlon Series

Sailing:

- Vendée Globe
- Tahiti Pearl Regatta

Cycling:

- Cape Epic
- Tour of Croatia
