= Ivan Marinković =

Serbian basketball player

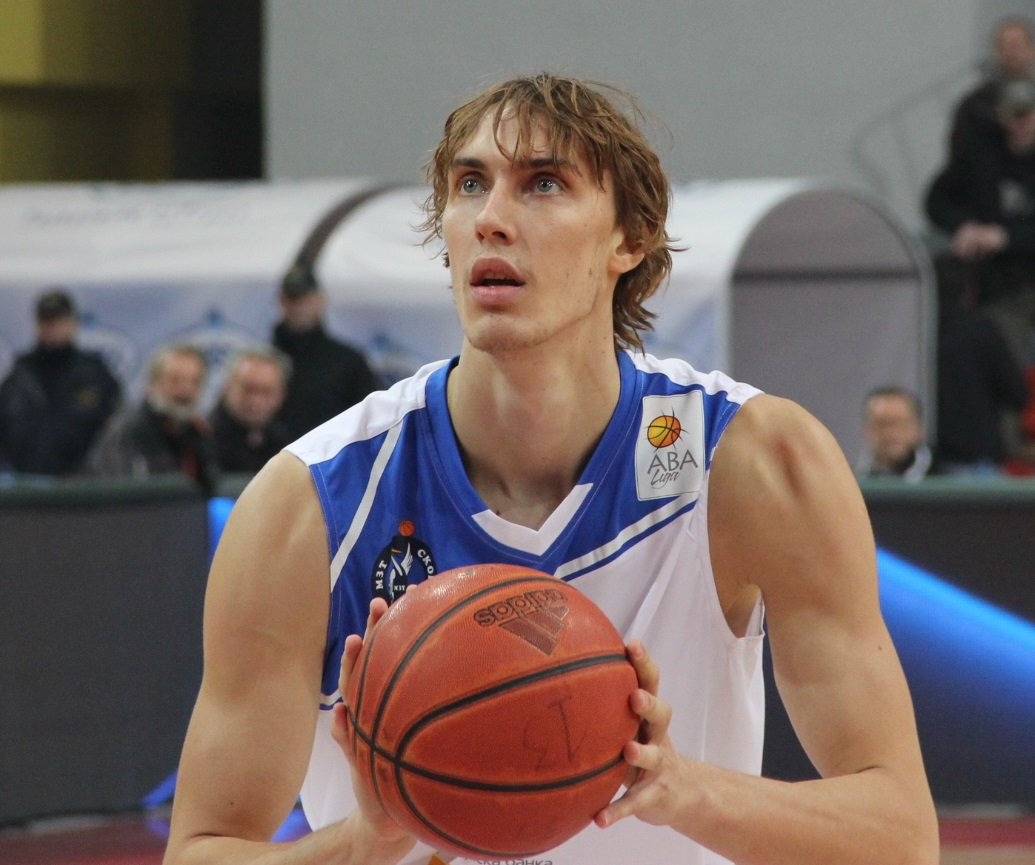
- Marinković with MZT in 2013

No. 17 – Metallurg Magnitogorsk
- Position: Power forward / center
- League: Russian Basketball Super League 1

Personal information
- Born: 27 November 1993 (age 32) Belgrade, FR Yugoslavia
- Listed height: 2.08 m (6 ft 10 in)
- Listed weight: 102 kg (225 lb)

Career information
- NBA draft: 2015: undrafted
- Playing career: 2010–present

Career history
- 2010–2011: Crvena zvezda
- 2011–2013: Partizan
- 2012–2013: → OKK Beograd
- 2013–2014: MZT Skopje
- 2015: Wilki Morskie Szczecin
- 2015–2017: Zadar
- 2017–2018: Yeşilgiresun Belediye
- 2018–2020: Primorska
- 2020–2021: Cedevita Olimpija
- 2021–2022: Borac Čačak
- 2023: Antwerp Giants
- 2023–2024: Hsinchu Lioneers
- 2024: CBet Jonava
- 2024–2025: Bosna
- 2025–2026: NKA Pécs
- 2026–present: Metallurg Magnitogorsk

Career highlights
- 2x Slovenian League champion (2019, 2021); ABA League 2 champion (2019,2025); Slovenian Cup winner (2019); Slovenian Supercup winner (2020); ABA League Top Scorer (2017)

Ivan Marinković (born 27 November 1993) is a Serbian professional basketball player for Metallurg Magnitogorsk of the Russian Basketball Super League 1. He plays the power forward and center positions.

== Club career ==
Marinković went through the youth ranks of KK Crvena zvezda and made a couple of first team appearances during the 2010–11 Adriatic League. In September 2011, he joined KK Partizan, a club where he made his first basketball steps. Three months later he signed his first, 4-year long, professional contract. On 27 August 2012 he was loaned to OKK Beograd till the end of the season. In December 2013, he signed with MZT Skopje for the rest of the season. In December 2014, he left MZT. On 28 January 2015 he moved to Poland and signed with Wilki Morskie Szczecin.

On 21 July 2015 he signed a three-year deal with Zadar.

On 7 August 2017 he signed with Turkish club Yeşilgiresun Belediye.

On 22 June 2018 he signed with Slovenian team Sixt Primorska.

On 4 February 2020 he signed with Cedevita Olimpija of the Slovenian League.

On 31 August 2021 he signed with Borac Čačak of the Basketball League of Serbia and the ABA League.

On 14 November 2023 he signed with Hsinchu Lioneers of the plus League.

== International career ==
Marinković was a member of the Serbian U20 team that reached semifinals on the 2012 European Under-20 Championship.
