= Saša Zagorac =

Slovenian basketball player

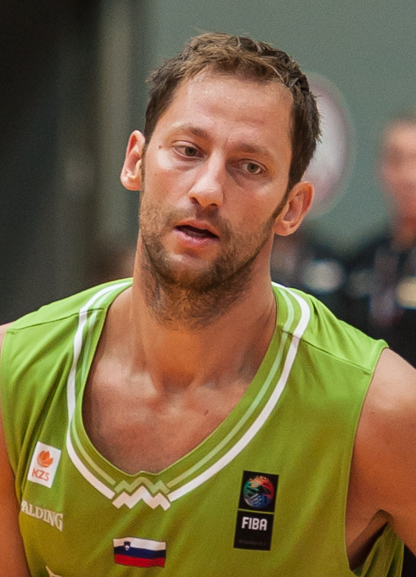
- Zagorac in 2016

Personal information
- Born: 1 January 1984 (age 42) Ljubljana, SR Slovenia, SFR Yugoslavia
- Listed height: 6 ft 9 in (2.06 m)
- Listed weight: 243 lb (110 kg)

Career information
- NBA draft: 2006: undrafted
- Playing career: 2002–2020
- Position: Forward
- Number: 17

Career history
- 2002–2004: Union Olimpija
- 2002–2003: → Birokrat SQL
- 2004–2005: Superfund Kapfenberg
- 2005: KK Rogla Atras
- 2006: Postojnska Jama Postojna
- 2006–2008: Caja Rural Melilla
- 2008–2009: Gandía
- 2009–2010: Alaior Menorcarentals.com Coinga
- 2011: Shiraz
- 2011: Banca Tercas Teramo
- 2011–2012: Knet & Éniac
- 2012: Aget Service Imola
- 2013–2014: Grosuplje
- 2014–2015: Zlatorog Laško
- 2015–2016: Union Olimpija
- 2016: Lukoil Academic
- 2017: Parma Basket
- 2017–2018: Soproni KC
- 2018: Krka
- 2018: Al-Riffa
- 2018-2019: Trefl Sopot
- 2019–2020: Cedevita Olimpija

Career highlights
- Slovenian League champion (2004)
Medals
Men's basketball
Representing Slovenia
EuroBasket
Gold medal – first place	2017 Finland–Israel–Romania–Turkey
Europe U20 Championship
Gold medal – first place	2004 Czech Republic	Team
Europe U18 Championship
Silver medal – second place	2002 Germany

Saša Zagorac (born 1 January 1984) is a Slovenian retired professional basketball player. He plays as forward and is the younger brother of Željko Zagorac. He announced his retirement on 18 July 2020.

== National team career ==
Zagorac was a member of Slovenia U18, U19, U20, and U21 national team. He played at 2005 FIBA Under-21 World Championship. He represented Slovenia at the 2015 EuroBasket where they were eliminated by Latvia in eighth-finals. In 2017 he became a champion in European Basketball Championship; with his experiences he played an important role in Slovenian team's mental preparation and scored some crucial points in semi-final's win over Spain.
