= Codi Miller-McIntyre =

Bulgarian basketball player (born 1994)

- Miller-McIntyre with Olympiacos in 2026

No. 0 – Olympiacos
- Position: Point guard
- League: GBL; EuroLeague

Personal information
- Born: June 1, 1994 (age 32) High Point, North Carolina, U.S.
- Listed height: 6 ft 3 in (1.91 m)
- Listed weight: 199 lb (90 kg)

Career information
- High school: First Assembly Christian School (Concord, North Carolina); Hargrave Military Academy (Chatham, Virginia)
- College: Wake Forest (2012–2016)
- NBA draft: 2016: undrafted
- Playing career: 2016–present

Career history
- 2016–2017: Leuven Bears
- 2017–2018: Parma
- 2018: Texas Legends
- 2018–2019: Zenit Saint Petersburg
- 2019–2020: Cedevita Olimpija
- 2020–2021: Partizan
- 2021: JL Bourg
- 2021–2022: Andorra
- 2022–2023: Gaziantep
- 2023–2024: Baskonia
- 2024–2026: Crvena zvezda
- 2026–present: Olympiacos

Career highlights
- 2× EuroLeague assists leader (2024, 2026); 2× Serbian Cup winner (2025, 2026); Greek Super Cup winner (2026); Pro League Top Scorer (2017); Pro League assists leader (2017); VTB United League assists leader (2018); EuroLeague records since the 2023–24 season: Most assists in a game
- Stats at Basketball Reference

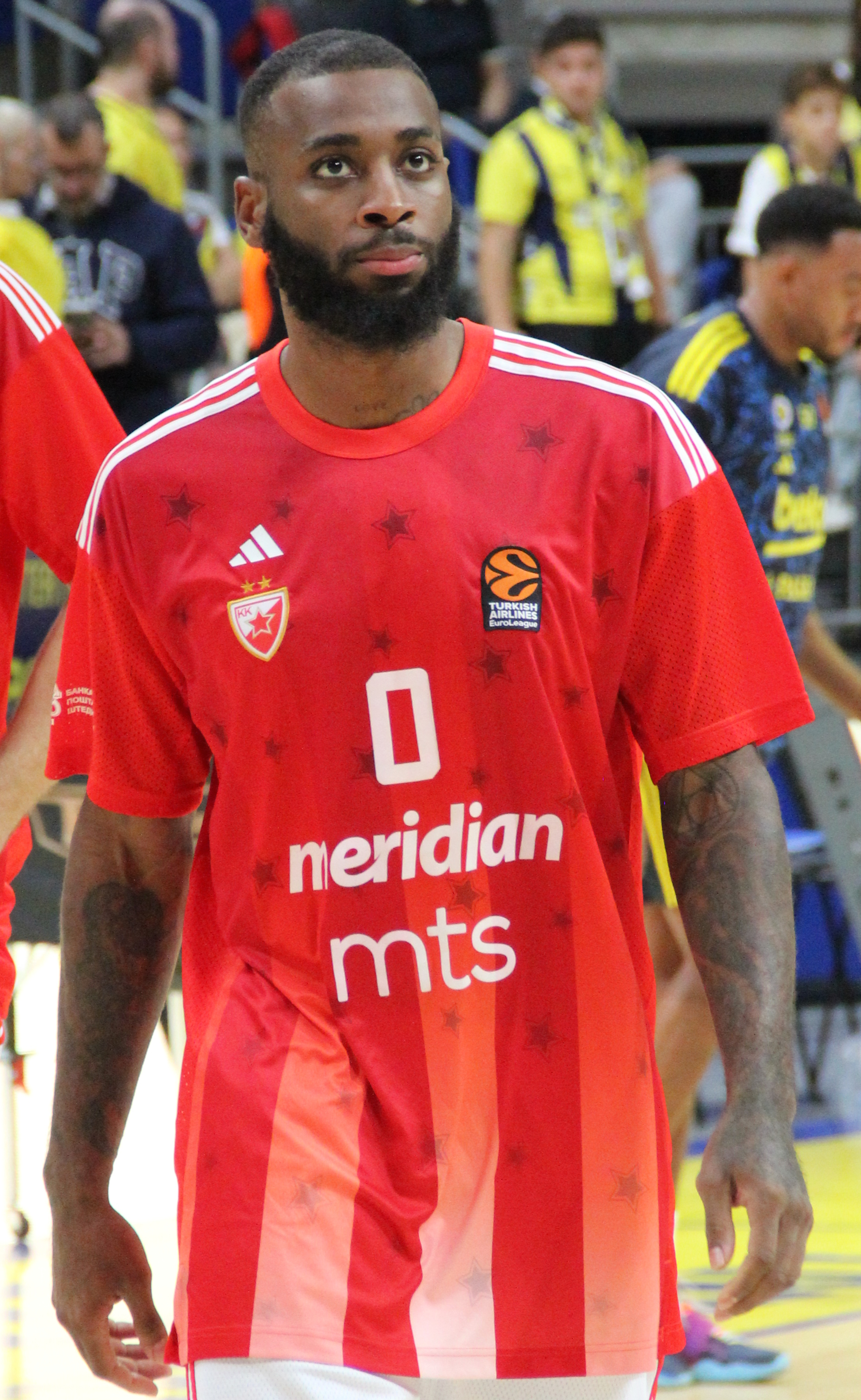
Miller-McIntyre with Crvena zvezda in 2024

Codi Tyree Miller-McIntyre (Bulgarian: Коди Тайри Милър-МакИнтайър; born June 1, 1994) is an American-born naturalized Bulgarian professional basketball player for Olympiacos of the Greek Basket League (GBL) and the Euroleague. He also represents the Bulgarian national team internationally. He is the third player in EuroLeague history to record a triple-double. Miller-McIntyre played four years of college basketball for Wake Forest University.

== High school career ==
Miller-McIntyre first attended First Assembly Christian School in Concord, North Carolina, before he transferred to Hargrave Military Academy in Chatham, Virginia, where he led Hargrave to a 38–1 overall record.

Rated as a four-star recruit in his class, Miller-McIntyre committed to Wake Forest University to play college basketball.

== College career ==
Miller-McIntyre played four seasons of college basketball at Wake Forest. He averaged 9.4 points and four assists per game as a senior. However, the season was hampered after he suffered a fractured left foot in October 2016 and missed the first eight games. He finished with 1,329 points and 441 assists.

=== Freshman season: (2012–13) ===
On January 2, 2013, Miller-McIntyre scored 16 points and 3 assist in a 66–59 win over Xavier. On January 22, 2013, Miller-McIntyre scored 15 points and 3 rebounds in a 86–84 victory against NC State.

=== Sophomore season (2013–14) ===
On November 8, 2013, Miller-McIntyre scored 21 points and 7 rebounds in a 89–78 win over Colgate. On November 12, 2013, Miller-McIntyre put up 23 points, 6 rebounds, and 7 assist in a 98–71 victory against VMI.

== Professional career ==
=== Leuven Bears (2016–2017) ===
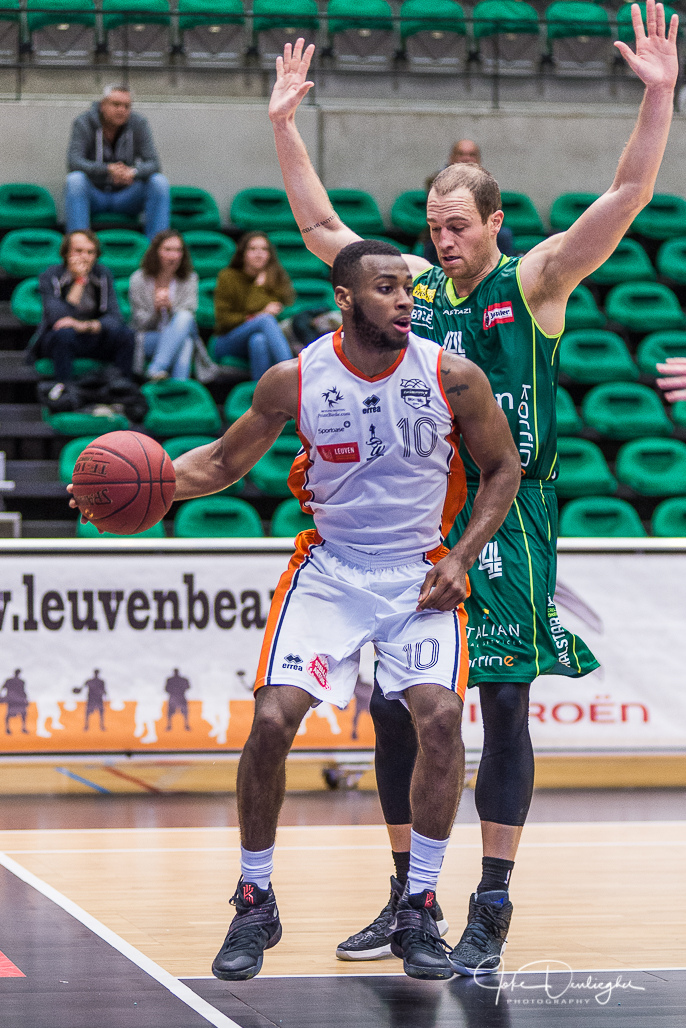
Miller-McIntyre playing for Leuven Bears in 2017

After going undrafted in the 2016 NBA draft, Miller-McIntyre signed his first professional contract with Leuven Bears on August 10, 2016. He led the Belgian league in both scoring and assists.

=== Parma (2017–2018) ===
On July 13, 2017, Miller-McIntyre signed with Parma Basket of the VTB United League. He averaged 16 points, five rebounds and eight assists per game and earned VTB United League All-Star honors. While in Perm, he visited several schools and helped teach English.

=== Texas Legends (2018) ===
On August 1, 2018, Miller-McIntyre signed with the Dallas Mavericks. He was then waived during training camp. He was added to the Mavericks' NBA G League affiliate, the Texas Legends.

=== Zenit Saint Petersburg (2018–2019) ===
On November 24, 2018, Miller-McIntyre returned to Russia to sign with Zenit Saint Petersburg.

=== Cedevita Olimpija (2019–2020) ===
On July 22, 2019, Miller-McIntyre signed a one-year contract with Slovenian club Cedevita Olimpija.

=== Partizan (2020–2021) ===
On July 1, 2020, Miller-McIntyre signed with Partizan Belgrade of the ABA League.

=== JL Bourg (2021) ===
On February 28, 2021, Miller-McIntyre signed with JL Bourg of LNB Pro A.

=== Andorra (2021–2022) ===
On July 13, 2021, Miller-McIntyre signed with Andorra of the Spanish Liga ACB.

=== Gaziantep (2022–2023) ===
On August 1, 2022, he signed with Gaziantep Basketbol of the Basketbol Süper Ligi.

=== Baskonia (2023–2024) ===
On July 17, 2023, Miller-McIntyre signed a two-year deal with Saski Baskonia of the Liga ACB and the EuroLeague.

=== Crvena zvezda (2024–2026) ===
On July 3, 2024, he signed a two-year deal with Crvena zvezda of the ABA League, Basketball League of Serbia (KLS), and the EuroLeague. In April 2026, he made Euroleague history by setting a new single-season assist record by finishing with 289 assists. He broke Nick Calathes record by three assists.

On June 1, 2026, Miller-McIntyre parted ways with the team.

=== Olympiacos (2026–present) ===
On July 2, 2026, Miller-McIntyre signed a three–year contract with Olympiacos of the Greek Basketball League (GBL) and the EuroLeague.

== National team career ==
In January 2023, Miller-McIntyre received Bulgarian citizenship via naturalization and accepted an invite to join the Bulgarian national team.

== Career statistics ==
Legend
| GP | Games played | GS | Games started | MPG | Minutes per game |
| FG% | Field-goal percentage | 3P% | 3-point field-goal percentage | FT% | Free-throw percentage |
| RPG | Rebounds per game | APG | Assists per game | SPG | Steals per game |
| BPG | Blocks per game | PPG | Points per game | PIR | Performance index rating |
| **Bold** | Career high |

=== EuroLeague ===
| * | Led the league |

| Year | Team | GP | GS | MPG | FG% | 3P% | FT% | RPG | APG | SPG | BPG | PPG | PIR |
|---|---|---|---|---|---|---|---|---|---|---|---|---|---|
| 2023–24 | Baskonia | 39 | 36 | 29.5 | **.467** | .290 | .698 | 4.4 | 7.3* | .9 | **.1** | 9.6 | 14.9 |
| 2024–25 | Crvena zvezda | 35 | 34 | 25.5 | .439 | .305 | **.714** | 3.1 | 4.6 | .6 | .0 | 10.3 | 10.9 |
| 2025–26 | Crvena zvezda | **39** | **39** | **30.5*** | .430 | **.330** | .605 | **4.5** | **7.4*** | **1.0** | **.1** | **12.6** | **15.0** |
| Career | | 113 | 109 | 28.4 | .443 | .314 | .665 | 4.0 | 6.5 | .9 | .0 | 10.8 | 13.4 |

=== EuroCup ===
| Year | Team | GP | GS | MPG | FG% | 3P% | FT% | RPG | APG | SPG | BPG | PPG | PIR |
|---|---|---|---|---|---|---|---|---|---|---|---|---|---|
| 2018–19 | Zenit | 8 | 6 | 22.6 | .321 | .273 | .333 | 1.9 | 5.6 | 1.1 | .1 | 5.8 | 6.1 |
| 2019–20 | Cedevita Olimpija | 10 | 9 | **29.7** | **.504** | .276 | .762 | **5.0** | 4.5 | **1.8** | — | **15.2** | **17.0** |
| 2020–21 | Partizan | 12 | 12 | 26.3 | .500 | **.395** | **.769** | 3.9 | 4.5 | 1.7 | .1 | 13.1 | 15.3 |
| 2021–22 | Andorra | **21** | **13** | 26.8 | .464 | .361 | .623 | 3.6 | **6.9** | 1.3 | **.3** | 13.4 | 16.3 |
| Career | | 51 | 40 | 26.6 | .467 | .339 | .680 | 3.7 | 5.7 | 1.5 | .2 | 12.5 | 14.6 |

=== FIBA Europe Cup ===
| Year | Team | GP | GS | MPG | FG% | 3P% | FT% | RPG | APG | SPG | BPG | PPG |
|---|---|---|---|---|---|---|---|---|---|---|---|---|
| 2022–23 | Gaziantep | 13 | 12 | 28.3 | .537 | .415 | .737 | 4.1 | 5.7 | 1.4 | .1 | 14.0 |
| Career | | 13 | 12 | 28.3 | .537 | .415 | .737 | 4.1 | 5.7 | 1.4 | .1 | 14.0 |

=== Domestic leagues ===
| Year | Team | League | GP | MPG | FG% | 3P% | FT% | RPG | APG | SPG | BPG | PPG |
|---|---|---|---|---|---|---|---|---|---|---|---|---|
| 2016–17 | (Belgium) Leuven Bears | PBL | 34 | 33.6 | .443 | .237 | .778 | 4.3 | 5.8 | 1.9 | .1 | 17.2 |
| 2017–18 | (Russia) Parma | VTBUL | 24 | 32.8 | .475 | .304 | .620 | 5.0 | 8.0 | 1.5 | — | 16.0 |
| 2018–19 | (United States) Texas Legends | G League | 8 | 36.5 | .382 | .219 | .769 | 5.9 | 6.6 | 2.0 | — | 10.6 |
| 2018–19 | (Russia) Zenit | VTBUL | 26 | 24.3 | .422 | .381 | .703 | 3.2 | 5.4 | .9 | .1 | 9.3 |
| 2019–20 | (Slovenia) Cedevita Olimpija | 1. SKL | 2 | 27.2 | .350 | .333 | — | 2.5 | 6.5 | .5 | — | 8.0 |
| 2019–20 | (Slovenia) Cedevita Olimpija | ABA | 21 | 30.3 | .477 | .333 | .765 | 3.8 | 5.1 | 1.1 | .0 | 14.0 |
| 2020–21 | (Serbia) Partizan | ABA | 14 | 24.5 | .394 | .333 | .836 | 2.9 | 3.1 | .9 | — | 12.6 |
| 2020–21 | (France) JL Bourg | LNB Élite | 13 | 25.5 | .436 | .327 | .733 | 3.2 | 4.4 | 1.1 | .1 | 10.9 |
| 2021–22 | (Spain) Andorra | ACB | 34 | 26.9 | .455 | .271 | .573 | 3.9 | 5.1 | 1.1 | .1 | 13.7 |
| 2022–23 | (Turkey) Gaziantep | TBSL | 28 | 33.8 | .469 | .306 | .686 | 4.4 | 5.9 | 1.5 | .1 | 15.4 |
| 2023–24 | (Spain) Baskonia | ACB | 33 | 28.7 | .471 | .309 | .729 | 3.1 | 5.9 | 1.1 | .1 | 10.4 |
| 2024–25 | (Serbia) Crvena zvezda | ABA | 33 | 21.1 | .429 | .322 | .836 | 2.2 | 3.7 | .9 | — | 9.4 |
| 2025–26 | (Serbia) Crvena zvezda | ABA | 20 | 21.7 | .468 | .333 | .765 | 2.5 | 4.9 | .8 | — | 9.8 |

=== College ===
| Year | Team | GP | GS | MPG | FG% | 3P% | FT% | RPG | APG | SPG | BPG | PPG |
|---|---|---|---|---|---|---|---|---|---|---|---|---|
| 2012–13 | Wake Forest | 30 | 29 | 28.9 | .414 | .323 | .565 | 2.7 | 2.6 | .6 | — | 8.1 |
| 2013–14 | Wake Forest | **32** | 31 | **32.2** | .433 | .200 | .628 | 3.0 | 4.2 | .8 | — | 12.6 |
| 2014–15 | Wake Forest | **32** | **32** | 31.5 | **.450** | .284 | .644 | **4.8** | **4.3** | **1.0** | **.3** | **14.5** |
| 2015–16 | Wake Forest | 23 | 20 | 30.5 | .413 | **.326** | **.656** | 4.5 | 4.0 | .8 | .1 | 9.4 |
| Career | | 117 | 112 | 30.8 | .431 | .278 | .631 | 3.7 | 3.8 | .8 | .1 | 11.4 |
