= Martin Krampelj =

Slovenian basketball player (born 1995)

- Krampelj in 2026

No. 10 – Bilbao Basket
- Position: Power forward / center
- League: Liga ACB

Personal information
- Born: 10 March 1995 (age 31) Ljubljana, Slovenia
- Listed height: 2.06 m (6 ft 9 in)
- Listed weight: 107 kg (236 lb)

Career information
- High school: Impact Basketball Academy (Sarasota, Florida)
- College: Creighton (2015–2019)
- NBA draft: 2019: undrafted
- Playing career: 2019–present

Career history
- 2019–2020: Cedevita Olimpija
- 2019–2020: →Andorra
- 2020: GTK Gliwice
- 2021–2022: Sioux Falls Skyforce
- 2022: Aguada
- 2022: Hamilton Honey Badgers
- 2022–2023: MKS Dąbrowa Górnicza
- 2023: Givova Scafati
- 2023: BC Astana
- 2023–2024: Iwate Big Bulls
- 2024–2025: Yalovaspor Basketbol
- 2025: Sagesse Club
- 2025–present: Bilbao Basket

Career highlights
- FIBA Europe Cup champion (2026)

Martin Krampelj (born 10 March 1995) is a Slovenian professional basketball player for Bilbao Basket of the Liga ACB. He played college basketball for the Creighton Bluejays.

== Early career ==
Krampelj was a member of youth categories at Grosuplje and later Krka.

== College career ==
In 2015, Krampelj announced his decision to attend the Creighton University in the United States and play for the Creighton Bluejays. Krampelj averaged 11.9 points and 8.1 rebounds per game as a redshirt sophomore, hitting 67.1-percent of his field goals. He tore his ACL in a game against Seton Hall on 17 January 2018, and was forced to miss the rest of the season. As a redshirt junior, Krampelj averaged 13.5 points and 6.9 rebounds per game, shooting 59.2 percent from the floor. He was named Honorable Mention All-Big East and led the Bluejays to a 20–15 record, advancing to the quarterfinals of the National Invitation Tournament. After the season, he opted to forego his final season of eligibility and enter the NBA draft.

== Professional career ==
=== Cedevita Olimpija (2019–2020) ===
After going undrafted in the 2019 NBA draft, Krampelj was named a member of the Denver Nuggets for the 2019 NBA Summer League.

On 12 July 2019, Krampelj signed his first professional contract with Cedevita Olimpija.

==== Loan to MoraBanc Andorra (2019–2020) ====
On 18 December 2019, MoraBanc Andorra announced that they had added Krampelj to their roster on loan from Cedevita Olimpija.

=== GTK Gliwice (2020) ===
On 20 August 2020, Krampelj signed with GTK Gliwice of the PLK. In seven games he averaged 10.0 points, 6.1 rebounds, 1.4 assists and 1.9 steals per game. Krampelj parted ways with the team on 9 October.

=== Sioux Falls Skyforce (2021–2022) ===
In October 2021, Krampelj joined the Sioux Falls Skyforce from the available player pool. On 3 February 2022, Krampelj was removed from the team by the Skyforce.

On 10 February 2022, Krampelj was reacquired and activated by Sioux Falls. He played 31 games and averaged 9.5 points, 5.4 rebounds and 1.1 assists in 19.5 minutes.

=== Aguada (2022) ===
In April 2022, Krampelj signed with Aguada from the Uruguayan League.

=== Hamilton Honey Badgers (2022) ===
On 5 May 2022, Krampelj signed with the Hamilton Honey Badgers of the CEBL.

=== MKS Dąbrowa Górnicza (2022–2023) ===
On 20 September 2022, he has signed with MKS Dąbrowa Górnicza of the Polish Basketball League (PLK).

=== Yalovaspor (2024–2025) ===
On 24 August 2024, he signed with Yalovaspor Basketbol of the Basketbol Süper Ligi (BSL).

=== Sagesse Club (2025) ===
On 14 June 2025, he signed with Sagesse Club of the Lebanese Basketball League (LBL).

=== Bilbao Basket (2025–present) ===
On 5 August 2025, he signed with Bilbao Basket of the Liga ACB. In 2026, Krampelj signed a two-year extension with the club.
