= Ryan Boatright =

American-Armenian basketball player (born 1990)

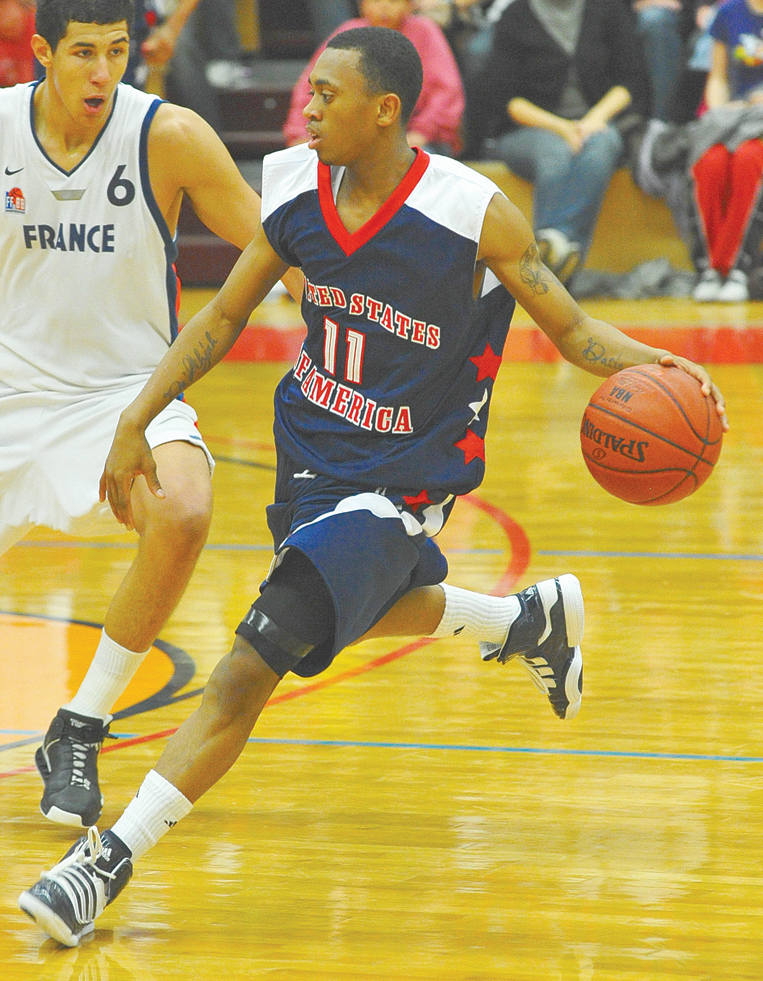
- Boatright in 2010

San Francisco Dons
- Title: Assistant coach
- League: West Coast Conference

Personal information
- Born: December 27, 1992 (age 33) Aurora, Illinois, U.S.
- Listed height: 5 ft 11 in (1.80 m)
- Listed weight: 175 lb (79 kg)

Career information
- High school: East Aurora (Aurora, Illinois)
- College: UConn (2011–2015)
- NBA draft: 2015: undrafted
- Playing career: 2015–2025
- Position: Point guard
- Coaching career: 2026–present

Career history

Playing
- 2015–2016: Grand Rapids Drive
- 2016: Orlandina Basket
- 2016: Guangzhou Long-Lions
- 2016–2017: Cedevita
- 2017–2018: Beşiktaş
- 2018: Agua Caliente Clippers
- 2018–2019: Texas Legends
- 2019: Unicaja
- 2019–2020: Cedevita Olimpija
- 2020: BC Avtodor
- 2020–2021: Rytas Vilnius
- 2021–2022: Paris Basketball
- 2022-2023: Avtodor Saratov
- 2023: BC Parma
- 2023–2024: Bnei Herzliya
- 2024: Apollon Patras
- 2024–2025: Shahrdari Gorgan
- 2025: Brillantes del Zulia

Coaching
- 2026–present: San Francisco (assistant)

Career highlights
- Croatian League champion (2017); Croatian League Finals MVP (2017); Croatian Cup winner (2017); NCAA champion (2014); First-team All-AAC (2015); Illinois Co-Mr. Basketball (2011)
- Stats at Basketball Reference

Ryan Jamar Boatright (born December 27, 1992) is an American-born naturalized Armenian former professional basketball player and coach who is currently an assistant coach for the San Francisco Dons. He represented the Armenian national basketball team in international competition. He completed his college career at University of Connecticut in 2015. Boatright was a key player for the Huskies' 2013–14 NCAA championship team, as he earned 2014 NCAA Final Four All-Tournament team honors.

== High school career ==
Boatright, an Aurora, Illinois native, averaged 31.2 points per game as a senior at East Aurora High School and was named Illinois Co-Mr. Basketball with Chasson Randle.

As a senior, he scored 63 points in a game against Proviso West, and another outing scoring 55 against St. Charles North. Boatright also led the charge in defeating and upsetting the undefeated Benet Academy Redwings in the Sectional Semifinals 60–52. Benet was ranked #1 in the state of Illinois, 7th in the nation with a team that featured Wisconsin-bound Frank Kaminsky. Boatright finished with 29 points and 6 assists. He had originally committed to West Virginia, but changed his mind when the Mountaineers signed another point guard just a day later. He then went on and decided to commit to the University of Connecticut.

== College career ==
=== Freshman year ===
Upon arriving at Connecticut, his eligibility was challenged. After he missed the first three games, the National Collegiate Athletic Association ruled that he would have to serve an additional three-game suspension to bring his total to six games served due to "receiving improper benefits", consisting of more than $8,000 in cash and other impermissible benefits that he and his mother had received. Upon further review, Boatright's suspension was increased to a total of nine games. Nonetheless, as a freshman he averaged 10.4 points, 4.0 assists and 3.3 rebounds in 30.1 minutes per game.

=== Sophomore year ===
Following his return, Boatright along with backcourt teammate Shabazz Napier both rose to the national spotlight as they were highlighted as one of the nation's best backcourts, as they both averaged a combined 33 points and 9 assists per game, outplaying nearly every opponents' backcourt they have played. He kept the momentum up in his sophomore season of 2012–13, raising his scoring average to 15.4. He was named to the USBWA All-District first-team at the conclusion of the season.

=== Junior year ===
On April 26, 2013, Boatright opted to return to the team for his junior year along with teammates Shabazz Napier and DeAndre Daniels. Boatright played 39 of UConn's 40 games, starting 38 of them, averaging 12.1 points, 3.4 assists, 1.6 steals and a career-best 3.5 rebounds. He averaged 13.5 points and 5.0 rebounds in the Final Four and was named to the All-Final Four team. He was one of four Huskies to average double-digit point totals in the inaugural American Athletic Conference tournament. Boatright scored in double-figures in 27 of 39 games and in all six of UConn's NCAA tournament games. He was second on the team this year with 61 steals, which were the most ever for him in a season.

Boatright's defense was a key factor in the Huskies' drive to the 2014 Final Four. He was named to the 2014 All-Final Four team and UConn won the national championship.

=== Senior year ===
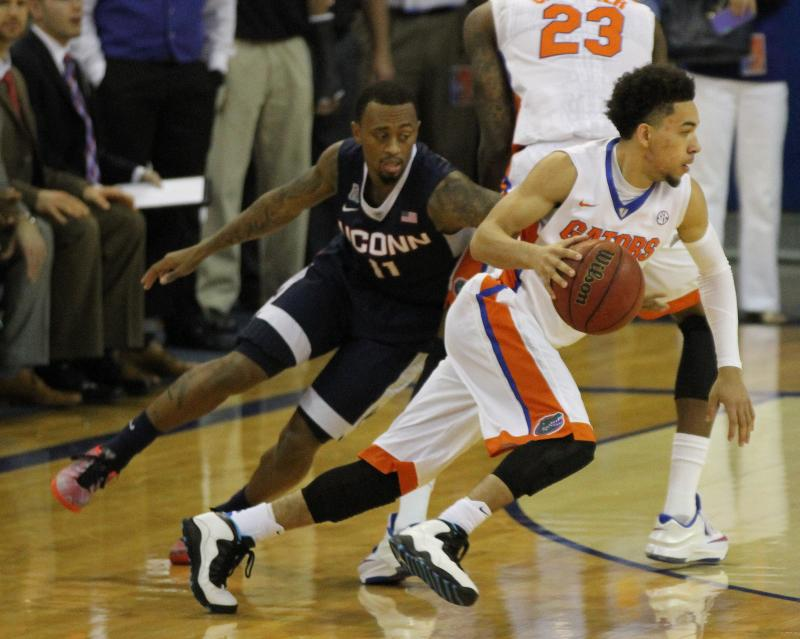
Boatright defending Chris Chiozza of Florida in January 2015

Upon the preseason of the 2014–15 season, Boatright was named the preseason All-American Athletic Conference player of the year and was selected to the preseason first team. Boatright was a unanimous first-team All-American Athletic Conference team selection in 2015.

=== College statistics ===
Year	Team	GP	GS	MPG	FG%	3P%	FT%	RPG	APG	SPG	BPG	PPG
2011–12	Connecticut	25	8	30.1	.421	.377	.690	3.3	4.0	1.2	.2	10.4
2012–13	Connecticut	30	30	36.3	.429	.333	.785	2.9	4.4	1.5	.1	15.4
2013–14	Connecticut	39	38	32.4	.391	.376	.798	3.5	3.4	1.6	.2	12.1
2014–15	Connecticut	34	34	35.8	.423	.411	.850	4.1	3.8	1.4	.2	17.4
Career		128	110	33.8	.416	.380	.794	3.5	3.8	1.4	.2	14.0

== Professional career ==
=== Grand Rapids Drive (2015–2016) ===
After going undrafted in the 2015 NBA draft, Boatright signed with the Brooklyn Nets on July 2 and joined the team for the 2015 NBA Summer League. In nine Summer League games for the Nets, Boatright averaged 14.1 points, 2.3 rebounds and 2.2 assists per game. On October 20, 2015, he was waived by the Nets after appearing in four preseason games.

On October 23, he signed with the Detroit Pistons. He was waived two days later.

On October 31, he was acquired by the Grand Rapids Drive of the NBA Development League as an affiliate player of the Pistons. On January 21, 2016, he was waived by the Drive.

=== Orlandina Basket (2016) ===
On January 26, Boatright signed with Orlandina Basket of the Italian Serie A.

=== Guangzhou Long-Lions (2016) ===
On July 30, 2016, Boatright signed with Guangzhou Long-Lions of the Chinese Basketball Association.

=== Cedevita Zagreb (2016–2017) ===
On November 21, 2016, Boatright signed with Cedevita Zagreb of the Croatian League after leaving China.

=== Beşiktaş (2017–2018) ===
On July 21, 2017, Boatright signed a 1+1 deal with Turkish club Beşiktaş.

=== Agua Caliente Clippers (2018) ===
For the 2018–19 season, Boatwright signed with the Agua Caliente Clippers of the NBA G League.

=== Texas Legends (2018–2019) ===
On December 16, 2018, the Texas Legends announced that they had acquired Boatright from the Agua Caliente Clippers.

=== Unicaja (2019) ===
On January 8, 2019, Unicaja announced that they had acquired Boatright. On May 27, 2019, he left the team.

=== Cedevita Olimpija (2019–2020) ===
On July 30, Boatright signed with Cedevita Olimpija of the ABA League. On January 20, 2020, he left the team.

=== BC Avtodor (2020) ===
On January 29, 2020, Boatright signed with BC Avtodor of the VTB United League. He averaged 16 points per game.

=== Rytas Vilnius (2020–2021) ===
On November 8, 2020, Boatright signed with BC Rytas of the Lithuanian Basketball League. On February 27, 2021, he left the team.

=== Paris Basketball (2021–2022) ===
On March 1, 2021, Boatright signed with Paris Basketball of the LNB Pro A.

=== Second stint with Avtodor Saratov (2022–2023) ===
On August 31, 2022, he has signed with Avtodor Saratov of the VTB United League.

=== Bnei Herzliya (2023–2024) ===
On August 10, 2023, Boatright signed with Bnei Herzliya of the Israeli Basketball Premier League.

=== Shahrdari Gorgan (2024–2025) ===
On September 25, 2024, Boatright signed with Shahrdari Gorgan of the Iranian Basketball Super League.

=== Brillantes del Zulia (2025) ===
On May 3, 2025, Boatright signed with Brillantes del Zulia of the Superliga Profesional de Baloncesto.

== Coaching career ==
On September 14, 2026, Boatright was hired by the University of San Francisco as an assistant basketball coach and the Dons' director of player development.

== National team career ==
Boatright acquired Armenian nationality by naturalization in order to be eligible to play for the Armenia national team, and to bypass team quotas on American players in European leagues.

In 2017, he played for Armenia in Euro pre-qualification Group A for the 2019 FIBA World Cup and the first two games of pre-qualification Group B of EuroBasket 2022 (then called EuroBasket 2021). He left the team in February 2018, with coach Nikša Bavčević saying he had demanded special treatment.

== Personal life ==
Boatright is the son of Mike McAllister and Tanesha Boatright. He has one brother Michael and two younger sisters, Dasia and Deahjay.
