= Mirko Mulalić =

Slovenian basketball player

No. 45 – Ilirija
- Position: Shooting guard

Personal information
- Born: April 16, 1988 (age 38) Ljubljana, SR Slovenia, SFR Yugoslavia
- Listed height: 1.95 m (6 ft 5 in)
- Listed weight: 90 kg (198 lb)

Career information
- NBA draft: 2010: undrafted
- Playing career: 2007–present

Career history
- 2007–2008: Union Olimpija
- 2008: → Triglav Kranj
- 2008–2010: TCG Mercator
- 2010–2011: Geoplin Slovan
- 2011-2012: Velike Lašče
- 2012: Grosuplje
- 2013–2014: Hopsi Polzela
- 2014–2016: Krka
- 2016–2017: Union Olimpija
- 2017–2018: Sixt Primorska
- 2018–2019: Balkan
- 2019–2020: Cedevita Olimpija
- 2021: Rabotnički
- 2021–2022: Alba Fehérvár
- 2022: Cedevita Olimpija
- 2023-2024: Ilirija

Career highlights
- 2× Slovenian League champion (2017, 2023); Bulgarian League champion (2019); 6× Slovenian Cup winner (2015–2018, 2022, 2023); Slovenian Supercup winner (2007, 2014)

Mirko Mulalić (born April 16, 1988) is a Slovenian professional basketball player who last played for Cedevita Olimpija of the Slovenian League and the ABA League.

== Professional career ==
In July 2007, he signed a one-year deal with Union Olimpija. In August 2014, he signed with another Slovenian team BC Krka.

On January 31, 2022, he signed with Cedevita Olimpija of the Slovenian League.
