= Petar Vujačić =

Slovenian basketball player (born 2000)

No. 7 – Zadar
- Position: Shooting guard
- League: ABA League; Croatian League

Personal information
- Born: January 19, 2000 (age 26) Maribor, Slovenia
- Listed height: 1.96 m (6 ft 5 in)

Career information
- NBA draft: 2022: undrafted
- Playing career: 2017–present

Career history
- 2017–2018: Rogaška
- 2018–2019: Petrol Olimpija
- 2019: → Šenčur GGD
- 2019–2020: Cedevita Olimpija
- 2019–2020: → Ilirija
- 2020–2022: Rogaška
- 2022–2024: Mornar
- 2023–present: Zadar

Career highlights
- Croatian League champion (2024); Croatian Cup winner (2024)
Medals
Men's basketball
Representing Slovenia
U18 European Championship Division B
Silver medal – second place	Skopje 2018

Petar Vujačić (born January 19, 2000) is a Slovenian professional basketball player for Zadar of the ABA League and Croatian League.

== Professional career ==
Vujačić started playing professional basketball for Rogaška in 2017. After one year he signed a four-year-contract with Olimpija.

On June 23, 2022, he has signed with Mornar of the ABA League and the Montenegrin League.

== Personal life ==
His step-brother Saša Vujačić is also a professional basketball player who used to play in the NBA.
