= Mate Vucić =

Croatian basketball player

No. 10 – AMW Arka Gdynia
- Position: Center
- League: PLK

Personal information
- Born: November 11, 1997 (age 29) Rijeka, Croatia
- Listed height: 2.04 m (6 ft 8 in)

Career information
- NBA draft: 2019: undrafted
- Playing career: 2014–present

Career history
- 2014–2018: Kvarner 2010
- 2018–2019: Bosco Zagreb
- 2019–2020: Cibona Zagreb
- 2020–2021: SCM U Craiova
- 2021–2022: HKK Široki
- 2022–2023: Krka Novo Mesto
- 2023–2024: Twarde Pierniki Toruń
- 2024–2025: Legia Warsaw
- 2025–2026: Anwil Włocławek
- 2026–present: Arka Gdynia

Career highlights
- PLK champion (2025); PLK rebounding leader (2024); ABA League Second Division champion (2023)

Mate Vucić (born November 11, 1997) is a Croatian professional basketball player for Arka Gdynia of the Polish Basketball League (PLK). He plays at the center position.

== Professional career ==
On April 16, 2023, Vucic helped Krka Novo Mesto to win the ABA League Second Division. During the 2023–24 season he became the best rebounder of Polish Basketball League.

On July 13, 2024, Vucic signed a contract with Legia Warsaw of Polish Basketball League (PLK).

On July 31, 2025, he signed with Anwil Włocławek of the Polish Basketball League (PLK).

On August 1, 2026, he signed with Arka Gdynia of the Polish Basketball League (PLK).
