= Jaka Blažič =

Slovenian basketball player

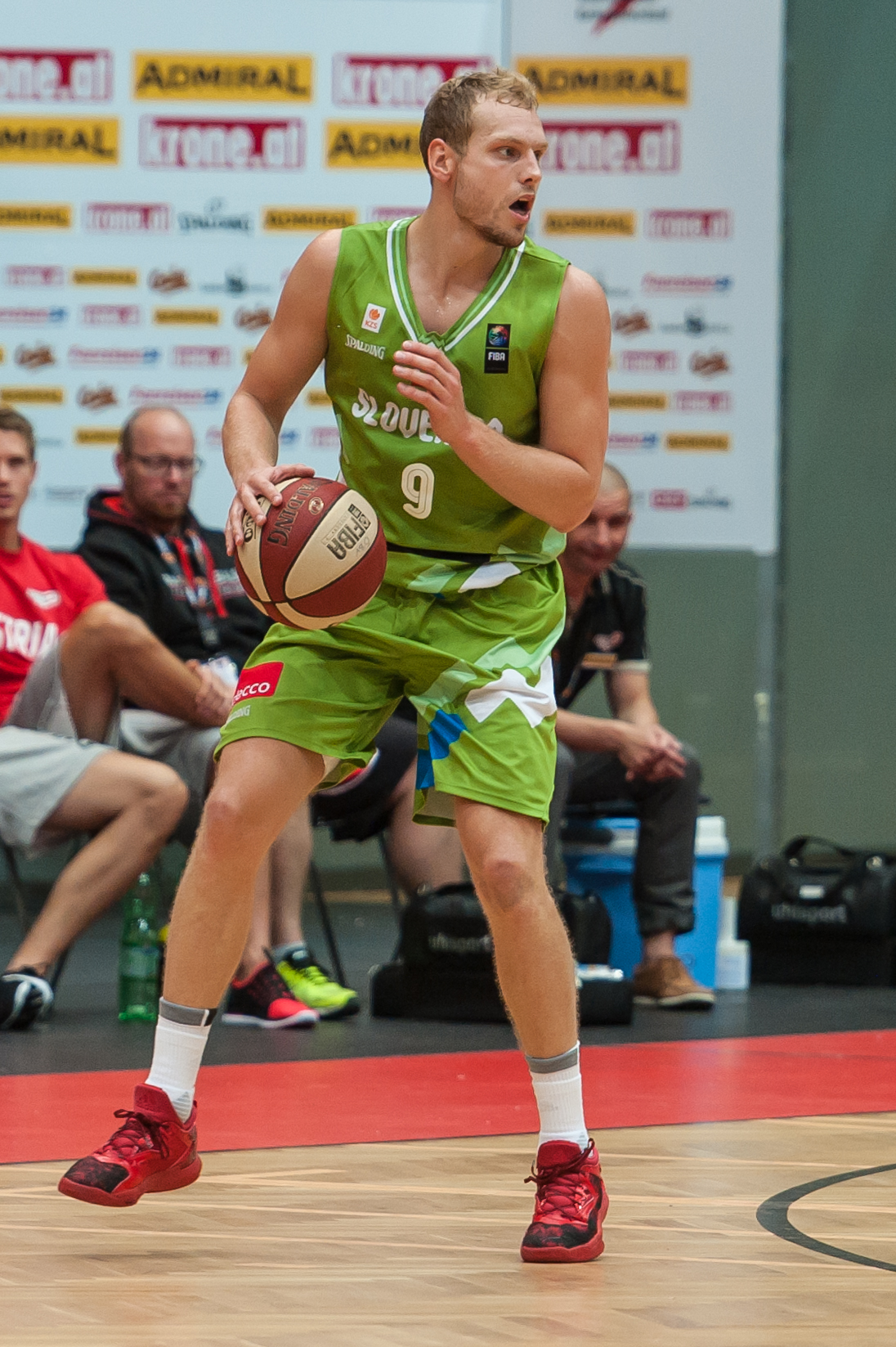
- Blažič in 2016 with Slovenia

No. 11 – Cedevita Olimpija
- Position: Shooting guard / small forward
- League: 1. SKL; ABA League; EuroCup

Personal information
- Born: 30 June 1990 (age 36) Jesenice, SR Slovenia, SFR Yugoslavia
- Listed height: 1.96 m (6 ft 5 in)
- Listed weight: 96 kg (212 lb)

Career information
- NBA draft: 2012: undrafted
- Playing career: 2007–present

Career history
- 2007–2009: Triglav
- 2009–2011: Slovan
- 2011–2013: Olimpija
- 2013–2015: Crvena zvezda
- 2015–2017: Baskonia
- 2017–2018: Andorra
- 2018–2019: Barcelona
- 2019–2022: Cedevita Olimpija
- 2022–2023: Bahçeşehir Koleji
- 2023–present: Cedevita Olimpija

Career highlights
- 2× All-EuroCup Second Team (2021, 2022); EuroCup Top Scorer (2021); ABA League champion (2015); 2× ABA League Ideal Starting Five (2021, 2022); Serbian League champion (2015); 5× Slovenian League champion (2021, 2022, 2024–2026); 5× Slovenian Cup winner (2012, 2013, 2022, 2024–2026); 2× Serbian Cup winner (2014, 2015); 4× Slovenian Supercup winner (2020, 2023, 2024, 2025)
Medals
Men's basketball
Representing Slovenia
EuroBasket
Gold medal – first place	2017 Finland–Israel–Romania–Turkey

Jaka Blažič (born 30 June 1990) is a Slovenian professional basketball player for Cedevita Olimpija of the Adriatic League and the Slovenian Basketball League. He also represented the Slovenian national basketball team. Standing at 1.96 m (6 ft 5 in), he plays the shooting guard and small forward positions.

== Early life ==
Born in the town of Jesenice in a family of athletes—skiing coach father Dušan Blažič and mother Ksenija who had formerly played volleyball—young Jaka took up basketball early. His younger sister Pia would go on to become a professional volleyball player.

== Professional career ==
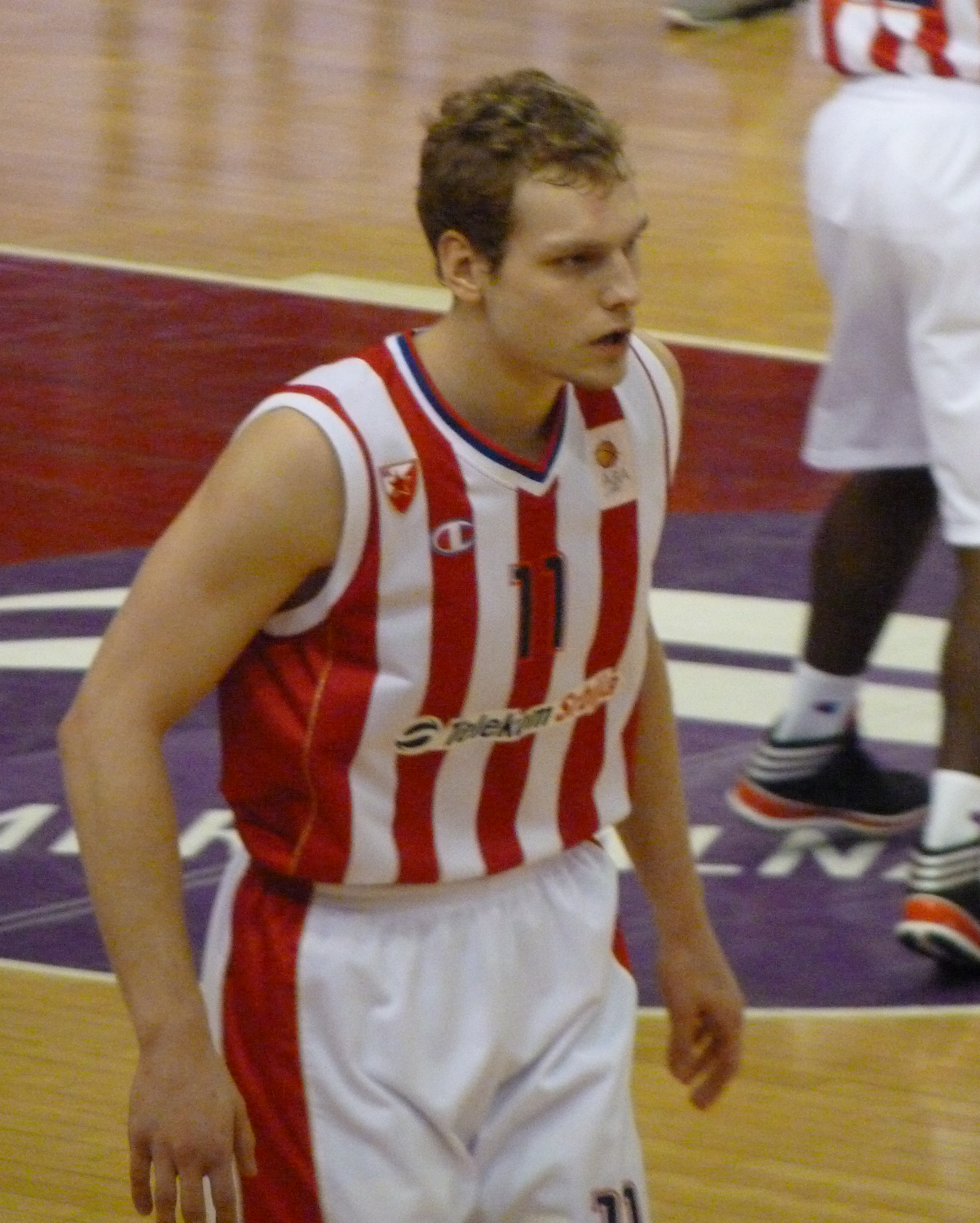
Blažič with Crvena zvezda in December 2013.

Blažič started his professional career in 2007 with Triglav Kranj. From 2009 to 2011 he played with Geoplin Slovan.

In July 2011, he signed a three-year deal with Union Olimpija.

On 18 June 2013 Blažič signed a three-year deal with the Serbian team Crvena zvezda. On 14 September 2015 he parted ways with the club.

One day later, on 15 September 2015, he signed a three-year contract with the Spanish team Baskonia. On 3 July 2017 Blažič parted ways with Baskonia.

On 16 July 2017 Blazič signed with MoraBanc Andorra for the 2017–18 season. On 9 August 2018 Blazič signed a one-year deal with FC Barcelona Lassa of the Liga ACB and the EuroLeague.

On 20 July 2019 Blazič signed a two-year contract with Cedevita Olimpija.

On 2 June 2022 he signed with Bahçeşehir Koleji of the Turkish Basketball Super League (BSL).

On 16 July 2023, Blažič signed for Cedevita Olimpija of the Slovenian Basketball League, the ABA League and the EuroCup. On 10 July 2024, he signed a two-year extension with the club. In 2026, he re-signed for one more season.

== National team career ==
As a member of the senior men's Slovenian national basketball team, Blažič competed at the EuroBasket 2013 and 2014 FIBA World Cup. He also represented Slovenia at the EuroBasket 2015 where they were eliminated by Latvia in eighth finals.

He was part of the national team at the 2017 EuroBasket and 2020 Summer Olympics where Slovenia took gold and fourth place, respectively.

== Career statistics ==
Legend
GP	Games played	GS	Games started	MPG	Minutes per game
FG%	Field-goal percentage	3P%	3-point field-goal percentage	FT%	Free-throw percentage
RPG	Rebounds per game	APG	Assists per game	SPG	Steals per game
BPG	Blocks per game	PPG	Points per game	PIR	Performance index rating
**Bold**	Career high

=== EuroLeague ===
Year	Team	GP	GS	MPG	FG%	3P%	FT%	RPG	APG	SPG	BPG	PPG	PIR
2011–12	Union Olimpija	10	1	14.2	.350	.182	.600	2.4	.4	.2	—	3.6	2.3
2012–13	Union Olimpija	10	9	**28.4**	.373	.278	.731	**4.0**	**1.9**	.5	—	**12.4**	**10.9**
2013–14	Crvena zvezda	10	2	19.7	.462	.345	.750	3.5	1.1	**.9**	**.2**	10.3	8.8
2014–15	Crvena zvezda	24	**10**	21.4	.422	.309	.750	2.8	1.0	.5	.1	9.1	5.8
2015–16	Baskonia	29	3	19.1	.433	.352	.793	3.2	.6	.6	0	7.8	6.4
2016–17	Baskonia	**33**	7	13.6	.397	**.387**	.560	2.1	.5	.5	—	4.7	3.3
2018–19	Barcelona	25	7	13.7	**.465**	**.387**	**.809**	2.3	.6	.4	.1	5.2	5.7
Career		141	39	17.6	.418	.338	.743	2.7	.7	.5	.1	7.0	5.7

== Personal life ==
=== 2014 traffic accident ===
In the early morning hours of Saturday, 4 October 2014, Blažič caused a traffic accident while driving under the influence, slamming his Volkswagen Golf into the back of a taxi vehicle while changing lanes at the corner of Nemanjina and Resavska streets in central Belgrade. No injuries were reported as the traffic patrol administered a breathalyzer test on the twenty-four-year-old KK Crvena zvezda basketball player, determining his blood alcohol level was above the 0.5‰ legal limit in Serbia. Several hours earlier, Friday evening 3 October 2014, Blažič had played in KK Crvena zvezda's opening game of the 2014–15 Adriatic League season versus Levski Sofia, an 85-55 blowout win in which he contributed 8 points including a spectacular dunk.

Later in the day, after paying the RSD16,000 (~€135) fine to the misdemeanor judge, Blažič publicly apologized "to the taxi driver whose car I hit, as well as to my club and its fans" while his club Crvena zvezda fined him according to its own disciplinary code of conduct by reportedly docking the amount of two monthly salaries from his pay.

== See also ==
- List of KK Crvena zvezda players with 100 games played
