= Donat Mg =

Slovenian brand of mineral water

Donat
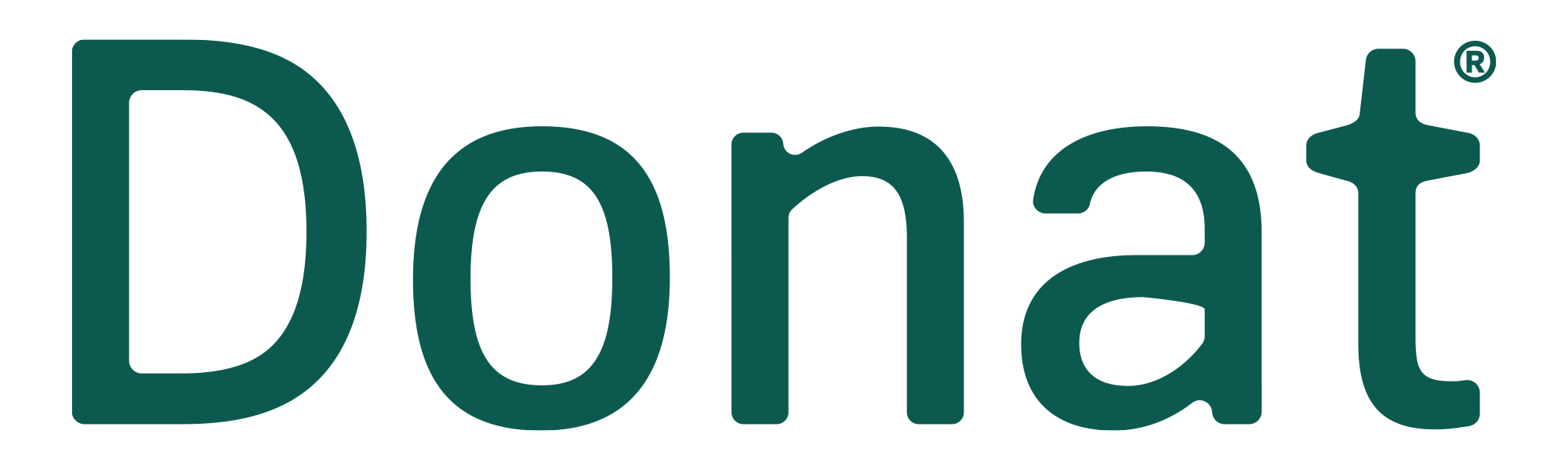
- Donat logo
- Type: mineral water
- Manufacturer: Rogaška Slatina-springs
- Origin: Slovenia
- Introduced: 1908; 118 years ago
- Colour: Transparent
- Website: www.donat.com

Donat is a natural mineral water from the springs of Rogaška Slatina in Slovenia. It has a high content of magnesium. It helps with constipation problems, heartburn and magnesium deficiency problems.

== History ==
Donat was first commercially available in 1908, but the history of Rogaška Slatina springs is much older. Excavation in the area confirmed Celtic and Roman settlements, indicating that the spring was already in use in ancient times.

The first owner of the springs was the parish of the nearby village Sveti Križ, and the first written records about the springs date back to 1141, when the mineral water spring was cited in a document as a boundary point in a property transaction. The first known analysis of the water was carried out in 1572.

=== Habsburg Monarchy ===
In 1670 Paul de Sorbait, Habsburg court physician and professor at the Medical Faculty of Vienna, introduced the water to the court and soon after several other physicians in Vienna and elsewhere in the empire began to prescribe to their patients various therapies with the water. The wells gained much popularity 1665 when the count Petar Zrinski promoted their healing powers. The hospital in Graz even tested it as a clinical medicine. During this time, the first inn by the springs was built in 1676 by Baron Peter Courty. In 1685 the physician Johann Benedikt Gründel from Maribor published the first scientific monograph "Roitschocrene" about the Rogaška mineral water (also called slatina).

In the early 17th century Emperor Leopold I gave the distribution rights to several important citizens of Vienna. In 1721, Emperor Charles VI assigned the sale rights to the Association of Viennese Pharmacists which retained these rights until 1782. Then a period of regression followed as far as the development of Rogaška was concerned, as Emperor Joseph II dissolved the Association of Pharmacists, and ownership fell into the hands of the local owners.

In the early 19th century, the Styrian provincial governor, Count Ferdinand Attems, begun a major campaign for the purchase of land around the Rogaška springs. His intention was supported by the general public and physicians of the empire as he wanted once and for all to prevent uncontrolled and unsafe use of springs and develop a modern, provincial-run spa. The works begun in 1801 and in 1869 the Rogaška water became the third most sold worldwide water immediately after the mineral water from French Vichy and German Selters. It was possible to purchase the water in all of the Austrian provinces, in Italy (Aqua di Cilla), Greece and also in Egypt. It even won a prize at the World's Columbian Exposition - World Exhibition in Chicago in 1893.

Since that time, tourism has been the major player in the area. Several hotels were built in the period of rapid growth between 1840 and 1860, and the new railway line Vienna-Trieste (1857) made the resort more accessible. The resort hosted many illustrious visitors, including members of the royal and ruling families (Habsburg, Bonaparte, Hohenzollern, Bourbon, Obrenović), members of high nobility (Esterhazy, Thurn und Taxis, Della Grazia, Furstenberg, Windischgraetz, Liechtenstein) and many other important guests, including Bishop Strossmayer, English traveler Richard Francis Burton, writer Bertha von Suttner and others. Several celebrities put in regular appearances too, such as the composer Franz Liszt who entertained the guests.

In 1908, a highly mineralized water spring was discovered by a team under the leadership of the geologist and inspector of the Karlovy Vary spa, dr. Joseph Knett. This mineral water was given the name DONAT.

=== Kingdom of Yugoslavia ===
In the interwar period, this part of Slovenia became a part of the Kingdom of Yugoslavia. Rogaška, as the most luxurious and modern resort in the entire territory, attracted the new elite, the government and military authorities and industrial moguls.

=== Communist Yugoslavia ===
Following the Second World War, new wells were found under the guidance of Professor Bać from Sarajevo and in collaboration with the Geological Institute in Ljubljana. This drilling signified a new beginning with regard to research and methods of capturing underground water in Slovenia. Up to the present time, the comprehensive geological, hydro-geological and geophysical research was carried out at Rogaška Slatina under the guidance of Professor Bać and Anton Nosan from the Geological Institute in Ljubljana. On the basis of the positive results of this research, quite a few wells were drilled for the capture of mineral water and CO_{2} gas which ensured a sufficient supply of mineral water, of type Donat (and Tempel), to the Health Spa Resort and its Bottling Complex.

=== Independent Slovenia ===
After Slovenian independence, the resort fell into disuse due to privatization, but it is now back on its feet, still reflecting its glorious past with many 19th century buildings lining the central promenade. Today Rogaška Slatina has several hotels Hoteli Rogaška, health resort Terme Rogaške, Spa park and several other facilities.

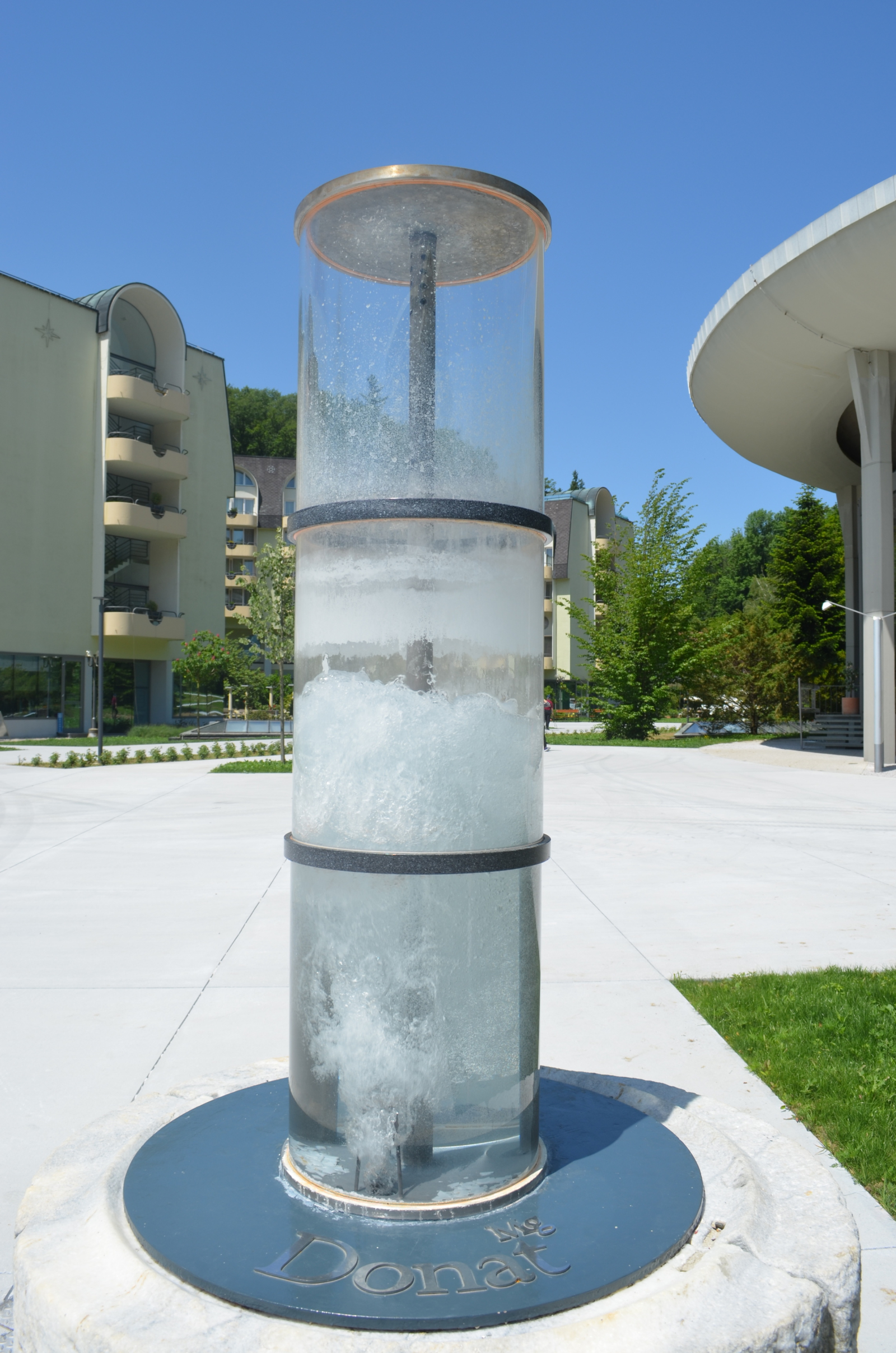
Donat Mg spring in the town of Rogaska Slatina.

Donat is a brand name registered by the company Droga Kolinska (located in Ljubljana) which is in turn owned by Atlantic Grupa and also produces Slovenia's best known soft drink, Cockta. Today, Donat is distributed in various European countries.

=== Production and sales ===
In 1934, most bottles were exported throughout Yugoslavia and abroad from the Tempel spring (90%), then from the Donat (16%) and Styria (14%), a total of 2,500,000 bottles.

In 1974, the bottling plant in Rogaška Slatina marketed Donat and Styria as medicinal water, and Tempel as table water. Styria was not sold due to insufficient quantity, and the other two were sold throughout Yugoslavia and Europe. They were in third place among Yugoslavian sellers of mineral water, after Radenska and Knjaz Miloš. Unlike Italy and France, they did not bottle mineral water, despite technical and financial obstacles, because CO_{2} evaporates from them, and they wanted to sell strongly carbonated water. At that time, bottles were already more expensive than water itself, and plastic baskets for bottles were also very expensive.

In 1975, geophysicist Janez Lapajne near Spodnja Kostrivnica determined the location for the most important well for pumping Donat Mg.

In 1976, Donat was succeeded by Donat Mg.

In 1977, Donat Mg surpassed Tempel for the first time in terms of production. Sales and exports grew.

In 1985, in addition to Donat Mg, Rogaška table mineral water was also sold. They opened a new filling line.

In 1986, a new distribution center was built in the port of Belgrade.

== Mineral content ==
Mineral contents

Total Dissolved Solids (TDS)	13197 mg/L
Calcium (Ca^{2+})	362 mg/L
Magnesium (Mg^{2+})	1040 mg/L
Sodium (Na^{+})	1570 mg/L
Potassium (K^{+})	17 mg/L
Chloride (Cl^{−})	74.4 mg/L
Sulfate (SO_{4}^{2−})	2092 mg/L
Fluoride (F^{−})	0.17 mg/L
Nitrate (NO_{3}^{−})	0.1 mg/L
Manganese (Mn^{2+})	0.11 mg/L
Aluminum (Al^{3+})	0.2 mg/L
Strontium (Sr^{2+})	9.8 mg/L

The recommended amount is 500 mL per day.

== Effects ==
=== Constipation ===
Because of its hyperosmolarity, Donat Mg is a natural osmotic laxative. It is classified as a saline laxative.

Its effectiveness as a laxative is due to sulphate salts (magnesium sulphate or Epsom salt and sodium sulphate or Glauber's salt) and around 1000 mg/L of magnesium. Sulphates draw water from the cells of the intestinal wall by osmosis, increasing the volume of intestinal content 3 to 5 times; this exerts pressure on the intestinal wall and triggers its peristalsis or movement. Magnesium also additionally stimulates the intestinal hormones that boost peristalsis.

=== Heartburn ===
The stomach makes 2 to 3 litres of acidic fluids each day. These consist mostly of hydrochloric acid and pepsin (an enzyme that speeds up the metabolism of proteins). Donat Mg contains approximately 7,800 mg of hydrogen carbonate. This high hydrogen carbonate content has a great capacity for bonding to acids and buffering free acids. It bonds to stomach acid in equal amounts.

Therefore, Donat Mg is a natural replacement for medicines against excess stomach acid.

=== Magnesium deficiency ===
Magnesium is one of the most important minerals and is essential for good health.

The amount of an element as important as magnesium is carefully regulated by the body. If cells begin to lack magnesium, the body replaces it from its own stores – from the bones and the liver. If the balance of magnesium is negative, the following general signs of deficiency quickly become apparent: constipation, loss of appetite, feeling unwell, fatigue, low energy, muscle spasms, pins and needles, irritability, sleep disorders, headaches, poor concentration and psychological changes.

Experts have determined that the recommended daily dose of magnesium for adults is 375 mg that means that 0,3-0,4 litres of Donat Mg natural mineral water is enough to satisfy the recommended daily allowance of magnesium.

== Clinical study ==
The clinical study conducted by the analysis & realize GmbH Institute from Berlin, Germany, has scientifically proven that Donat Mg is effective in stimulating digestion. The study was performed in accordance with all the professional codes of conduct governing the clinical trial of medicinal products. The study covered a sample of subjects with constipation problems based on clinical parameters. After six weeks, the subjects who consumed Donat Mg experienced three times more frequent bowel movement than the subjects from the control group. During the study, more than 94% of trial subjects and 97% of investigators stated that Donat Mg was effective, well tolerated and that it had improved their quality of life. For safety and effectiveness assessment of Donat Mg natural mineral water with regard to bowel function was conducted a randomised, placebo-controlled, double-blind clinical trial.
