= KK Cedevita Olimpija =

Basketball club in Ljubljana, Slovenia

Cedevita Olimpija
- Nickname: Zmaji (The Dragons)
- Leagues: Slovenian First League; ABA League; EuroCup
- Founded: 8 July 2019; 7 years ago
- History: KK Cedevita Olimpija (2019–present)
- Arena: Arena Stožice; Tivoli Hall
- Capacity: 12,480 (Stožice); 4,500 (Tivoli)
- Location: Ljubljana, Slovenia
- Team colors: Green, orange, white
- Main sponsor: Atlantic Grupa
- President: Emil Tedeschi
- General manager: Davor Užbinec
- Head coach: Zvezdan Mitrović
- Team captain: Jaka Blažič
- Championships: 6 Slovenian Championships; 5 Slovenian Cups; 6 Slovenian Supercups; 70 Inherited trophies
- Retired numbers: 3 (10, 12, 13)
- Website: cedevita.olimpija.com
| Home | Away | Third |

Košarkarski klub Cedevita Olimpija (English: Cedevita Olimpija Basketball Club), commonly referred to as KK Cedevita Olimpija or simply Cedevita Olimpija, is a men's professional basketball club based in Ljubljana, Slovenia. The club competes in the Slovenian First League, the ABA League, and the EuroCup.

The club was established in 2019 after the merger of the most successful Slovenian club Olimpija and the Croatian club Cedevita. Cedevita Olimpija inherited 70 trophies of both predecessors and their competition licences for its inaugural season.

== History ==
=== Background ===
KK Cedevita Olimpija is an outcome of a merger of two clubs from neighboring countries, the Slovenian club Petrol Olimpija from Ljubljana and the Croatian team Cedevita from Zagreb, which is the first such instance of two clubs from different countries merging.

Olimpija was the winner of 17 Slovenian Championships and 20 Slovenian Cups. It traces its history back to 1946 and adopted the name Olimpija in 1955. The club was an early power in the Yugoslav League with Ivo Daneu leading Olimpija to six domestic titles between 1957 and 1970. After Slovenia's independence in 1991, Olimpija won ten out of eleven championships between 1992 and 2002. Olimpija won the FIBA Saporta Cup in the 1993–94 season, and Arriel McDonald and Marko Milič helped it to the 1997 Euroleague Final Four. Over the years, Olimpija had a streak of 17 straight EuroLeague appearances and it won the inaugural Adriatic League in the 2001–02 season. Olimpija won the Slovenian League in 2009 and brought home its sixth straight Slovenian Cup in 2013 before going on a four-year trophy drought. During that span, Olimpija made its EuroCup debut in the 2013–14 season, but it wasn't until the 2016–17 season that it got back to its winning ways with the Slovenian League and Cup double. Olimpija won its last Slovenian League championship in the 2017–18 season.

Cedevita was the winner of five Croatian League Championships and seven Croatian Cup tournaments. It was founded in Zagreb in 1991 as KK Botinec. The club reached the first-tier league in 2002, but its ambitions rose when Atlantic Grupa took over in 2005 and the club changed its name to Cedevita. The club reached the 2011 EuroCup Final Four; Dontaye Draper was named EuroCup MVP, and Aleksandar Petrović EuroCup Coach of the Year. A year later, Cedevita won its first title, the Croatian Cup, led by veteran forward Matjaž Smodiš. Cedevita made its EuroLeague debut in the 2012–13 season, which it finished with a 2–8 record. That turned out to be a title-less season, but the last such for Cedevita, which celebrated a Croatian double in each of the next five years. In the 2015–16 EuroLeague, Cedevita reached the Top 16. The club also won the inaugural Adriatic Supercup in 2018. In 2019, Cedevita won the Croatian Cup for the sixth season in a row.

=== Establishment ===
On 4 June 2019, it was announced that Cedevita and Petrol Olimpija plan to merge and form Cedevita Olimpija, a new men's professional basketball club based in Ljubljana, Slovenia. On 13 June, the management boards of Cedevita and Olimpija have confirmed the appointment of Davor Užbinec as a general manager and Sani Bečirovič as a sports director. On 25 June, the EuroCup Board confirmed the club's participation in the 2019–20 EuroCup season. On 8 July, the club was officially established with Slaven Rimac being confirmed as the first team head coach, as well as Tomaž Berločnik named the president of the club.

KK Cedevita continued to compete under the name Cedevita Junior, and reached the top division of Croatian basketball in 2020–21.

=== Inaugural season and first titles ===
Slovenian forward Edo Murić became the first-ever player who signed for the club. Next to players added from Cedevita and Petrol Olimpija rosters, the club signed veterans Mirko Mulalić, Saša Zagorac, and Marko Simonović, as well as Martin Krampelj, Mikael Hopkins, Jaka Blažič, Codi Miller-McIntyre, and Ryan Boatright. On 11 September 2019, guard Jaka Blažič was named the first team captain. In September 2019, Cedevita Olimpija lost to Partizan in the 2019 ABA Supercup final. The team also finished as runners-up of the Slovenian Cup. In EuroCup, Olimpija participated in Group C and finished in sixth place, before the competition was cancelled in the playoffs due to the COVID-19 pandemic. The Slovenian League and the ABA League were also cancelled. In mid-season, former Olimpija player Jurica Golemac replaced Rimac as head coach.

In the 2020–21 season, Cedevita Olimpija signed two Slovenian international players, Žiga Dimec and Luka Rupnik, and the top scorer of the 2019–20 ABA League season, Kendrick Perry. At the beginning of the season, the club won its first trophy since the merger as they beat Krka in the Slovenian Supercup. In the EuroCup and the ABA League, Cedevita Olimpija was only one win away from advancing to the playoffs. However, the team won the national league for the first time in three years after sweeping Krka 3–0 in the final. At the beginning of the 2021–22 season, Cedevita Olimpija won its tenth Supercup title after beating Krka, which was followed by their first Slovenian Cup title in five years after defeating Helios Suns in the final, their second trophy of the season.

== Identity ==
The main colours of Cedevita Olimpija are green and orange. Green has been used by Olimpija, while orange was used by Cedevita. The crest consists of a green dragon, one of the symbols of the city of Ljubljana, and a capital letter 'C' in orange, which stands for Cedevita. In addition, the entire crest is framed in green.

== Home arena ==
Cedevita Olimpija play their home games at Arena Stožice, often referred to as Zmajevo gnezdo (Dragon's Nest) in Slovenian media. It was opened in August 2010 after fourteen months of construction and is part of the Stožice Sports Park complex. Arena has a seating capacity of 12,480.

Occasionally, Cedevita Olimpija play their home games at the Tivoli Hall, which has a capacity of 4,500.

== Players ==
=== Current roster ===
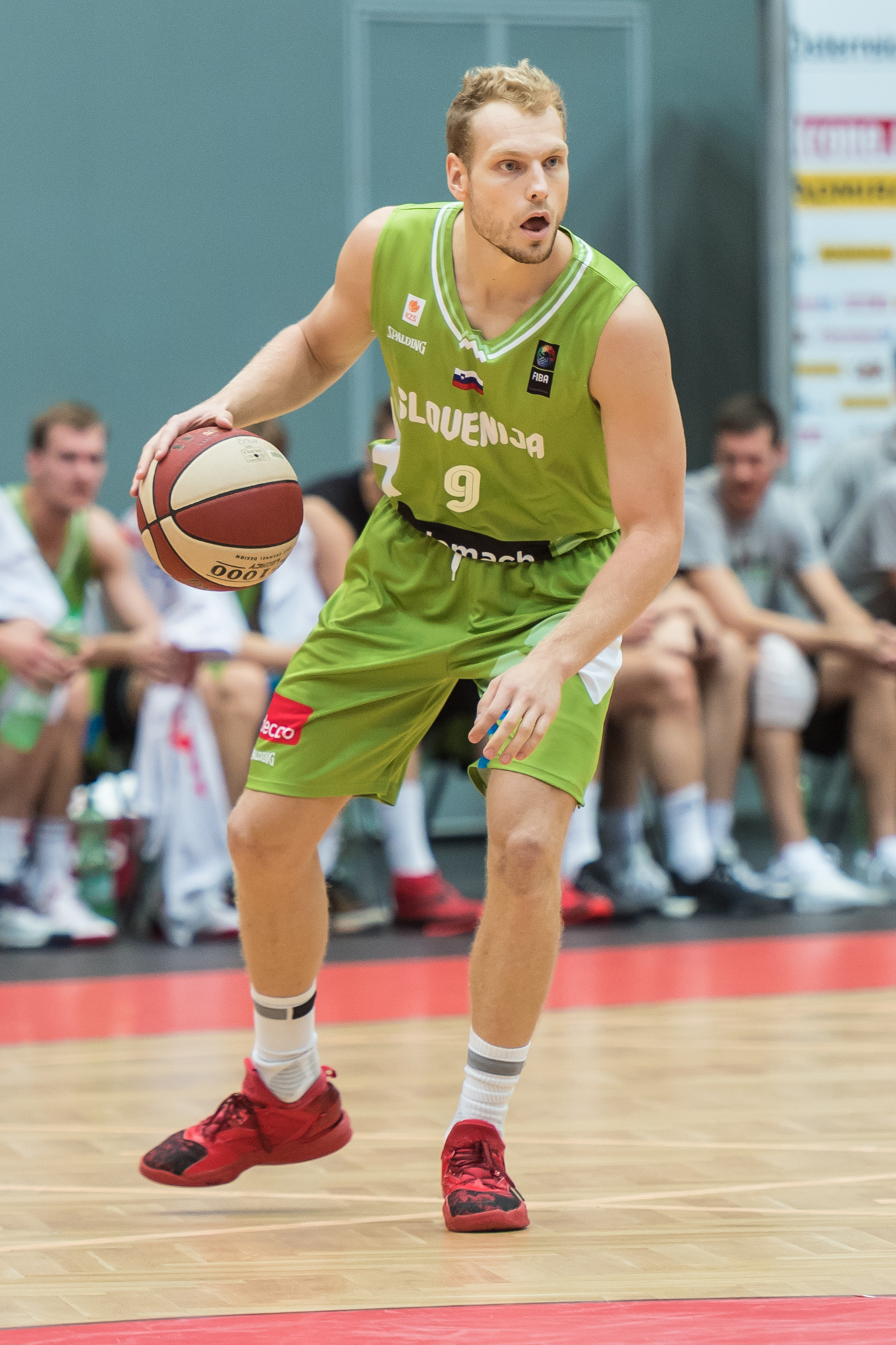
Jaka Blažič, the current club captain

Note: Flags indicate national team eligibility at FIBA-sanctioned events. Players may hold other non-FIBA nationalities not displayed.

Cedevita Olimpija roster
Players
Coaches

| Pos. | No. | Nat. | Name | Ht. | Age |
|---|---|---|---|---|---|
| SG | 0 | (United States) | Brandon Murray | 1.96 m (6 ft 5 in) | 24 – 7 February 2002 |
| PG | 1 | (United States) | Anthony Cowan Jr. | 1.83 m (6 ft 0 in) | 29 – 7 October 1997 |
| F | 3 | (Slovenia) | Rok Radović | 2.00 m (6 ft 7 in) | 25 – 4 February 2001 |
| PG | 4 | (United States) | Jordan Gainey | 1.93 m (6 ft 4 in) | 24 – 26 June 2002 |
| SG | 6 | (Latvia) | Rihards Lomažs | 1.93 m (6 ft 4 in) | 30 – 13 April 1996 |
| PG | 7 | (Turkey) | Derin Can Ustun | 1.93 m (6 ft 4 in) | 19 – 7 March 2007 |
| PF/C | 8 | (France) | Cameron Houindo | 2.04 m (6 ft 8 in) | 18 – 10 January 2008 |
| SG | 11 | (Slovenia) | Jaka Blažič (C) | 1.96 m (6 ft 5 in) | 36 – 30 June 1990 |
| PF/C | 14 | (South Africa) | Osayi Osifo | 2.06 m (6 ft 9 in) | 26 – 6 April 2000 |
| F | 20 | (Slovenia) | Miha Cerkvenik | 2.01 m (6 ft 7 in) | 25 – 9 November 2001 |
| PF | 21 | (United States) | Matthew Hurt | 2.06 m (6 ft 9 in) | 26 – 20 April 2000 |
| G/F | 22 | (Canada) | Noah Kirkwood | 1.99 m (6 ft 6 in) | 26 – 27 December 1999 |
| G | 23 | (Slovenia) | Urban Kroflič | 1.98 m (6 ft 6 in) | 20 – 28 March 2006 |
| PF | 24 | (Croatia) | David Škara | 2.01 m (6 ft 7 in) | 31 – 26 February 1995 |
| C | 34 | (United States) | Jayce Johnson | 2.12 m (6 ft 11 in) | 29 – 1 August 1997 |

Head coach

- (Montenegro) Zvezdan Mitrović

Assistant coach(es)

- (Serbia) Đorđe Adžić
- (Slovenia) Dalibor Damjanović
- (Slovenia) Grega Nachbar

Strength & conditioning coach(es)

- (Croatia) Filip Ujaković

Physiotherapist(s)

- (Slovenia) Borut Černilogar
- (Slovenia) Jakob Jesih

Team manager

- (Slovenia) Matic Zupanc

Legend

- (C) Team captain
- Injured

- Roster
Updated: 23 September 2026

=== Retired numbers ===
Cedevita Olimpija retired numbers
| No. | Nat. | Player | Position | Tenure | Ceremony date |
|---|---|---|---|---|---|
| 10 | (Slovenia) | Dušan Hauptman | SG | 1982–1998^{OL} | 29 January 2023 |
| 12 | (Slovenia) | Marko Milič | PF | 1994–1997, 1999–2000, 2006–2007, 2007–2009^{OL} | 28 October 2015 |
| 13 | (Slovenia) | Ivo Daneu | PG/SG | 1956–1970^{OL} | 7 November 2007 |

Notes

- ^{OL} Played for KK Olimpija Ljubljana (1946–2019)

=== Notable former players ===
Note: Flags indicate national team eligibility at FIBA-sanctioned events. Players may hold other non-FIBA nationalities not displayed.

Criteria

To appear in this section a player must have either:

- Set a club record or won an individual award while at the club
- Played at least one official international match for their national team at any time
- Played at least one official NBA match at any time.

- (Slovenia) Saša Ciani
- (Slovenia) Žiga Daneu
- (Slovenia) Žiga Dimec
- (Slovenia) Zoran Dragić
- (Slovenia) Gregor Glas
- (Slovenia) Alen Hodžić
- (Slovenia) Jaka Klobučar
- (Slovenia) Edo Murić
- (Slovenia) Aleksej Nikolić
- (Slovenia) Alen Omić
- (Slovenia) Bine Prepelič
- (Slovenia) Klemen Prepelič
- (Slovenia) Matic Rebec
- (Slovenia) Luka Rupnik
- (Slovenia) Luka Ščuka
- (Slovenia) Saša Zagorac
- (Armenia) Ryan Boatright
- (Austria) Luka Brajkovic
- (Austria) Rašid Mahalbašić
- (Bosnia and Herzegovina) Amar Alibegović
- (Bosnia and Herzegovina) Andrija Stipanović
- (Bulgaria) Codi Miller-McIntyre
- (Canada) Melvin Ejim
- (Canada) Thomas Kennedy
- (Croatia) Lovro Gnjidić
- (Croatia) Karlo Matković
- (Croatia) Roko Ukić
- (Georgia (country)) Jacob Pullen
- (Germany) Maik Zirbes
- (Greece) Zach Auguste
- (Hungary) Mikael Hopkins
- (Hungary) Jarrod Jones
- (Kosovo) Dominic Artis
- (Kosovo) Shawn Jones
- (Montenegro) Justin Cobbs
- (Montenegro) Kendrick Perry
- (Serbia) Ognjen Jaramaz
- (Serbia) Marko Jeremić
- (Serbia) Marko Simonović
- (United States) Yogi Ferrell
- (United States) D.J. Stewart Jr.

== Head coaches ==
- (Croatia) Slaven Rimac (2019–2020)
- (Slovenia) Jurica Golemac (2020–2023)
- (Slovenia) Miro Alilović (2023) (interim)
- (Italy) Simone Pianigiani (2023–2024)
- (Slovenia) Zoran Martić (2024)
- (Montenegro) Zvezdan Mitrović (2024–present)

== Trophies and awards ==
=== Trophies won ===
- Slovenian Championship
  - Winners (6) – 2020–21, 2021–22, 2022–23, 2023–24, 2024–25, 2025–26
- Slovenian Cup
  - Winners (5) – 2022, 2023, 2024, 2025, 2026
- Slovenian Supercup
  - Winners (6) – 2020, 2021, 2022, 2023, 2024, 2025

=== Inherited trophies ===
After Olimpija Ljubljana and Cedevita Zagreb merged into Cedevita Olimpija, the newly-formed club obtained the right to the trophies of the two predecessors clubs.

| Honours | | No. | Years |
National league – 28
| Yugoslav League (1946–1991)^{OL} | Winners | 6 | 1957, 1959, 1961, 1962, 1966, 1969–70 |
| Slovenian League (1991–2019)^{OL} | Winners | 17 | 1991–92, 1992–93, 1993–94, 1994–95, 1995–96, 1996–97, 1997–98, 1998–99, 2000–01, 2001–02, 2003–04, 2004–05, 2005–06, 2007–08, 2008–09, 2016–17, 2017–18 |
| Croatian League (1991–2019)^{CZ} | Winners | 5 | 2013–14, 2014–15, 2015–16, 2016–17, 2017–18 |
National cup – 27
| Slovenian Cup (1991–2019)^{OL} | Winners | 20 | 1992, 1993, 1994, 1995, 1997, 1998, 1999, 2000, 2001, 2002, 2003, 2005, 2006, 2008, 2009, 2010, 2011, 2012, 2013, 2017 |
| Croatian Cup (1991–2019)^{CZ} | Winners | 7 | 2012, 2014, 2015, 2016, 2017, 2018, 2019 |
National supercup – 10
| Slovenian Supercup (2003–2019)^{OL} | Winners | 8 | 2003, 2004, 2005, 2007, 2008, 2009, 2013, 2017 |
| Croatian Supercup (2011–2015)^{CZ} | Winners | 2 | 2011, 2015 |
Regional competitions – 4
| ABA League (2001–2019)^{OL} | Winners | 1 | 2001–02 |
| Central European League (1992–1994)^{OL} | Winners | 2 | 1992–93, 1993–94 |
| ABA League Supercup (2017–2018)^{CZ} | Winners | 1 | 2017 |
European competitions – 1
| FIBA Saporta Cup (1966–2002)^{OL} | Winners | 1 | 1993–94 |

Notes

- ^{OL} Won by KK Olimpija Ljubljana (1946–2019)
- ^{CZ} Won by KK Cedevita Zagreb (1991–2019)

== Management ==
- President: Emil Tedeschi
- Vice-presidents: Tomaž Berločnik, Damjan Kralj, Andrej Slapar
- Management board: David Kovačič, Nada Drobne Popović, Blaž Brodnjak, Emil Tedeschi Jr., Zoran Stankovič, Jurij Žurej, Enzo Smrekar
- General manager: Davor Užbinec
- Sporting director: Chechu Mulero
- Technical director: Krešimir Novosel
