= Istrabenz =

- Type: public company
- Industry: Conglomerate
- Founded: 1948
- Defunct: 2024
- Fate: Merged with Slovenian State Holdings
- Headquarters: Koper, Slovenia
- Key people: Igor Bavčar, CEO
- Revenue: ▲US$941 million (2007)
- Number of employees: 4,722 (2007)
- Website: www.istrabenz.si

Istrabenz was one of Slovenia's largest holding company, with a total of 73 companies under its management. In 2024 it was merged into its parent company Slovenian State Holdings (SDH).

== Activities ==
- Food (24 companies): Droga Kolinska d.d., Grand Kafa AD Beograd, Štark AD Beograd, Palanački Kiseljak AD Smederevska Palanka
- Investments (10 companies)
- Tourism (8 companies): Istrabenz Marina Invest d.o.o., Istrabenz Turizem d.d. Portorož, Marina Koper d.o.o., Istrabenz Hoteli d.o.o. Portorož, Imperial Palace d.o.o.
- Energy (18 companies): Instalacija d.o.o. Koper

== History ==
Istrabenz entered the Ljubljana Stock Exchange in 1997.

Istrabenz financed the growth of Openad until the holding ran out of cash in 2008.

From 2002 to 2009, the company was headed by Igor Bavčar, Slovenia's former interior minister. In September 2009, Igor Bavčar was detained on suspicions of corruption and money laundering while he was head of Istrabenz.

In July 2010, Istrabenz sold major food manufacturer Droga Kolinska to Atlantic Grupa for €382 million.

In September 2015, Istrabenz sold the Kempinski Palace Portorož for $25 million. In March 2016, Istrabenz Turizem sold the Grand Hotel Adriatic in Opatija to Croatian company Teri-trgovina as part of a disinvestment program.

In June 2016, Istrabenz sold the remaining 51% it held in Istrabenz plini (gas subsidiary) to Italian Siad.

In September 2024, SDH announced that Istrabenz would merge with Istrabenz, which had reported losses for several years before. As part of the merger, SDH took over 50% of the shares of Adriafin.
