= Rogaška Slatina =

- Town
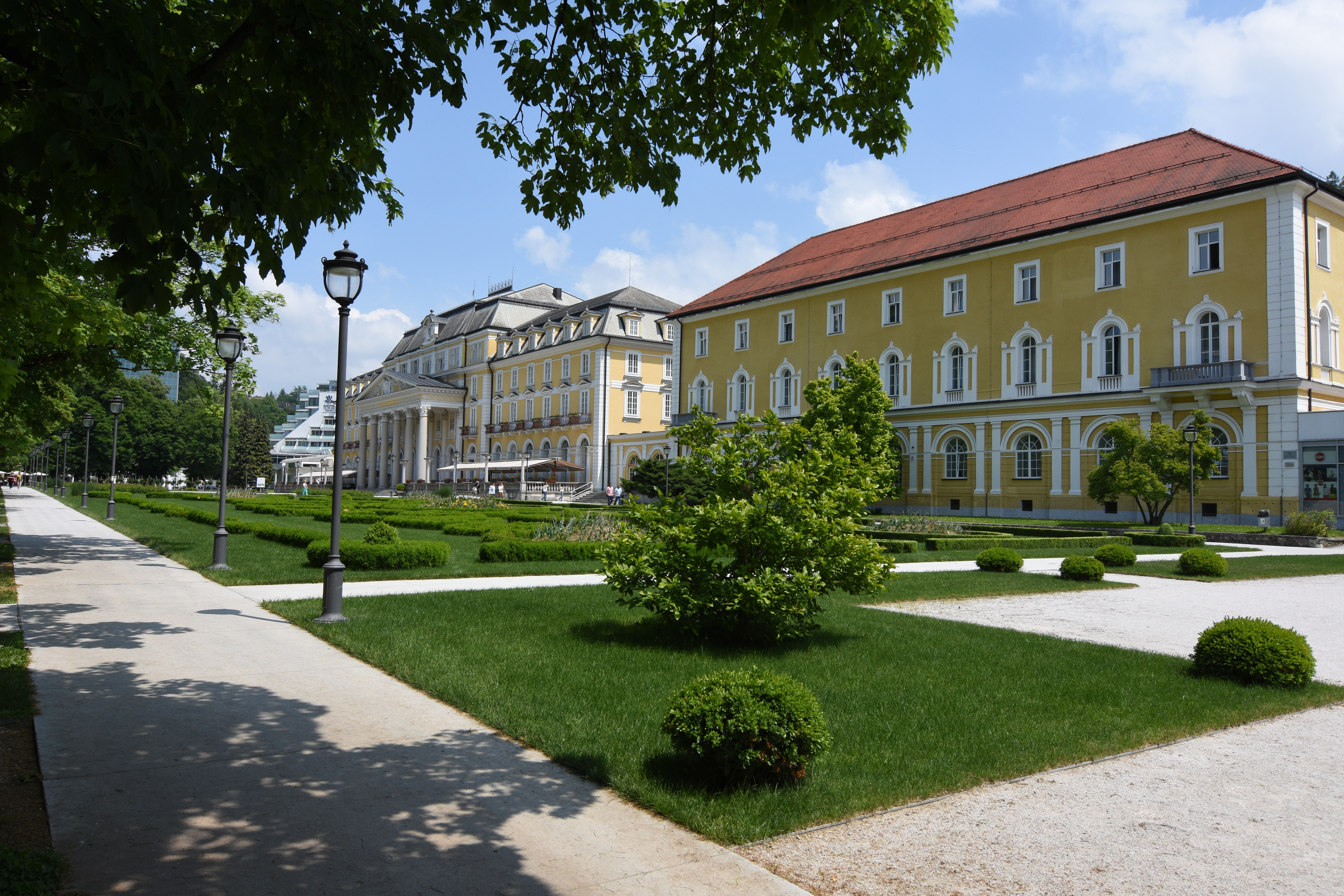
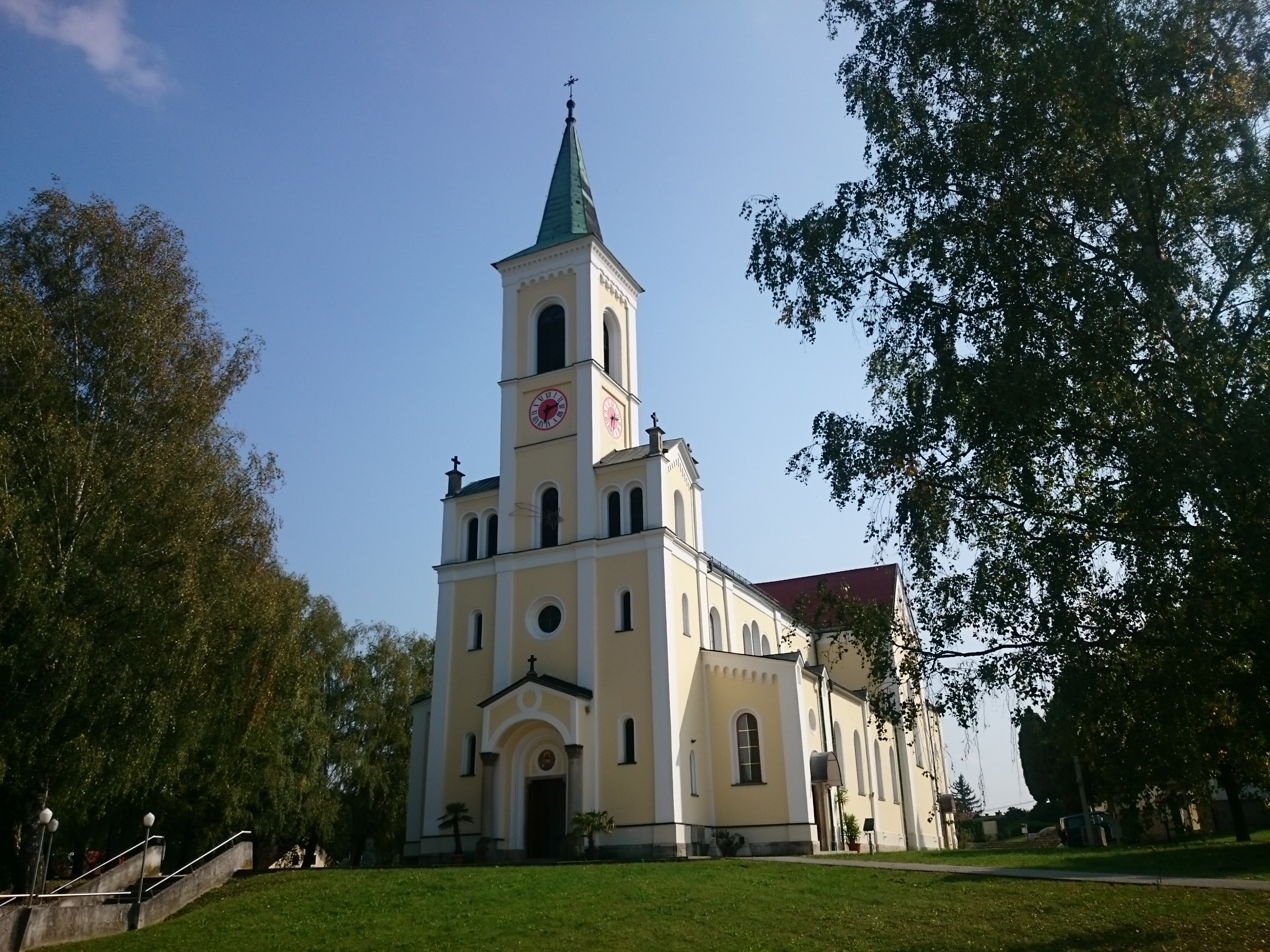
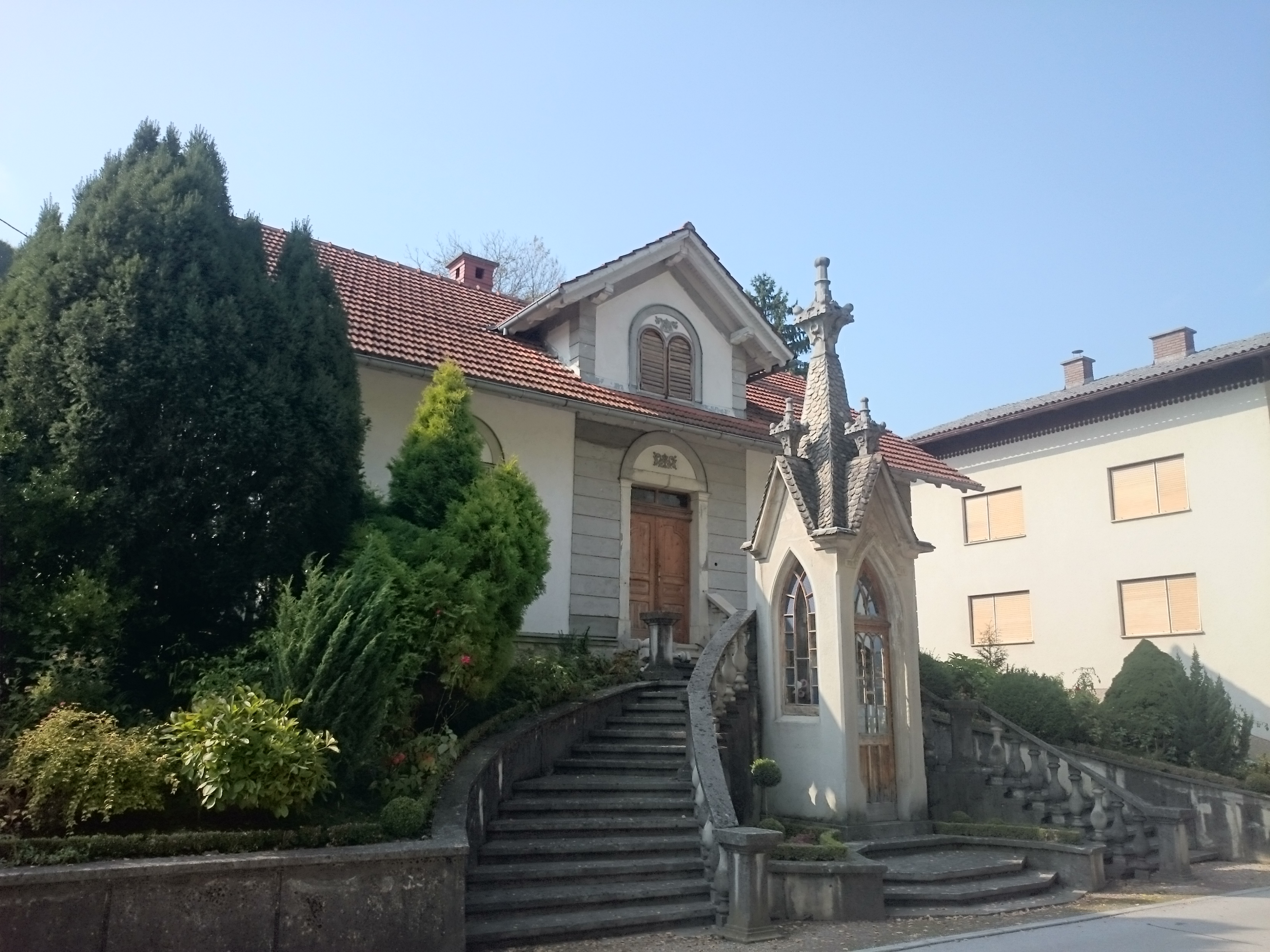
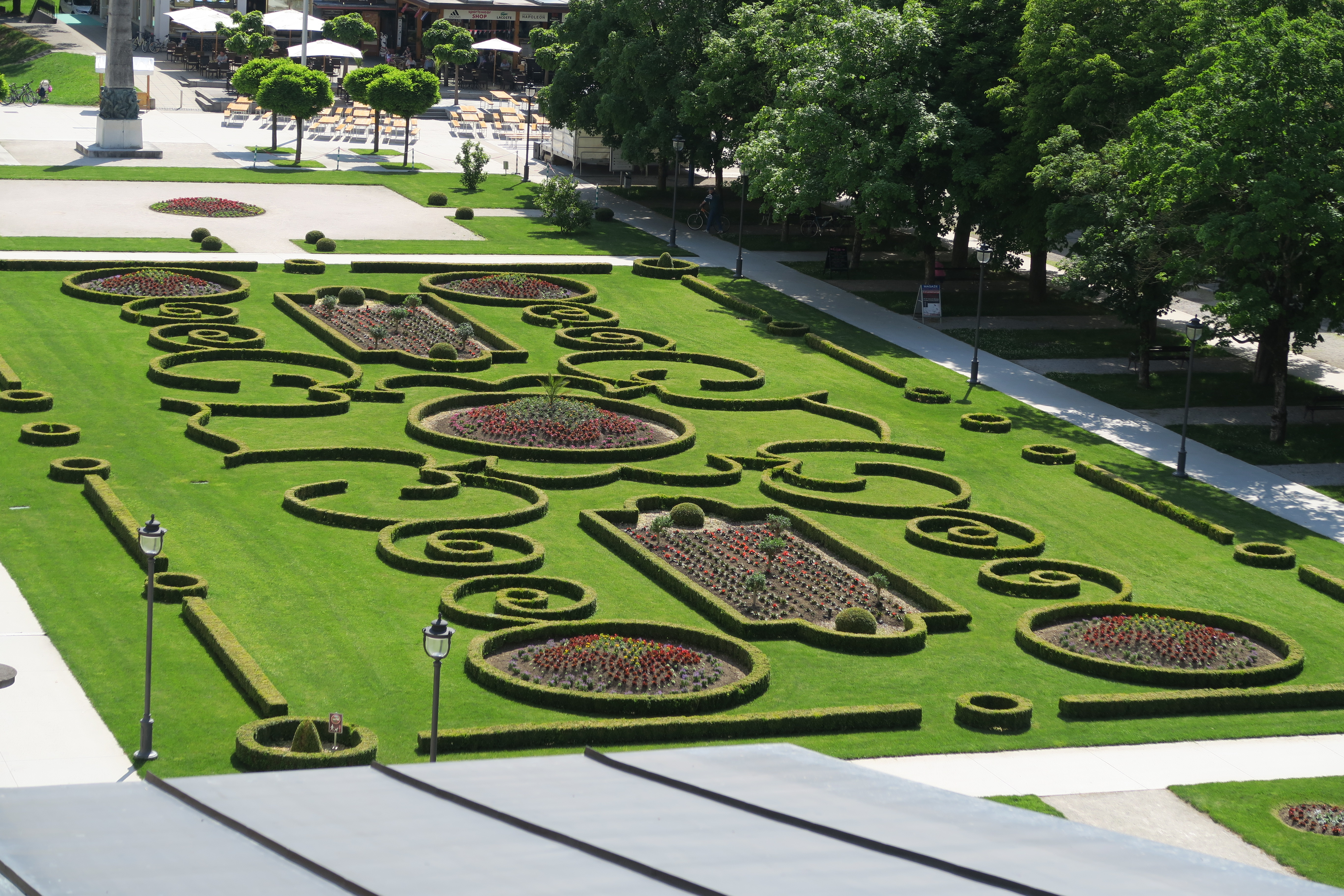
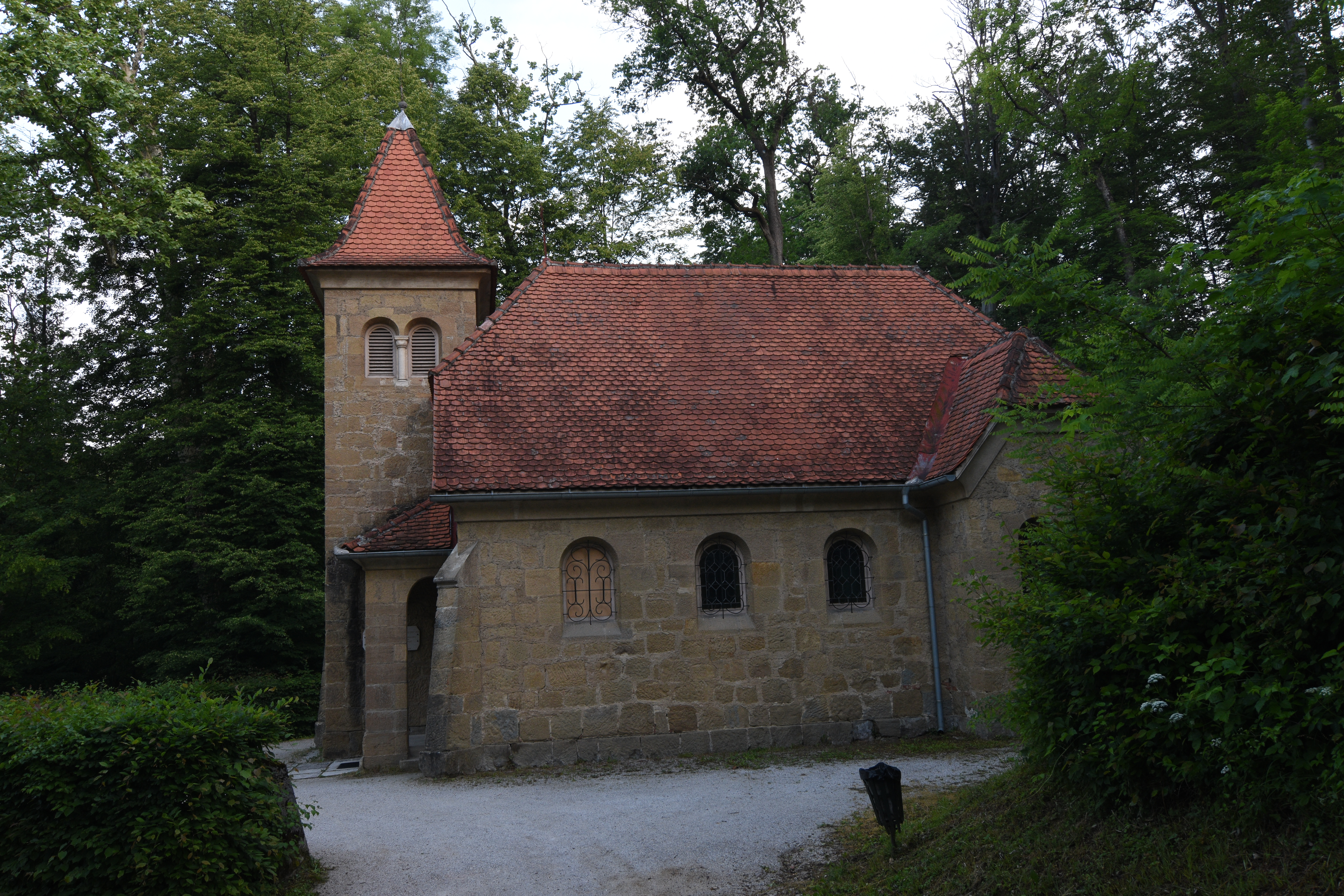
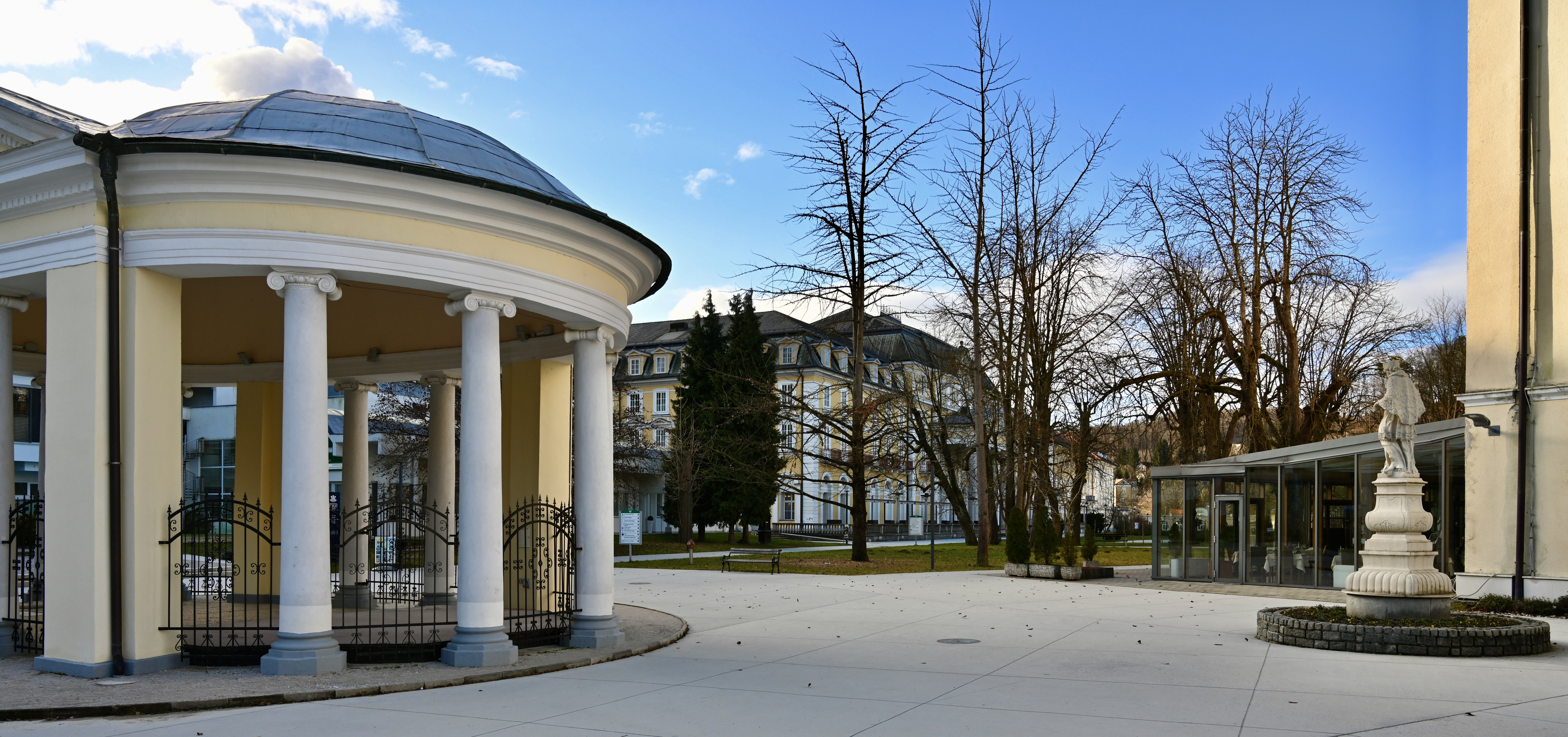
- From top, left to right: Grand Hotel and the main street, Holy Cross Church, Town villa, Town park, Chapel

- Flag Coat of arms

- Location in Slovenia
- Coordinates: 46°13′53″N 15°38′17″E
- Country: Slovenia
- Traditional region: Styria
- Statistical region: Savinja
- Municipality: Rogaška Slatina

Government
  - Mayor: Branko Kidrič

Area
  - Total: 5.44 km^{2} (2.10 sq mi)
- Elevation: 223.6 m (734 ft)

Population (2021)
  - Total: 5,082
  - Density: 934/km^{2} (2,420/sq mi)

Rogaška Slatina (pronounced [ɾɔˈɡáːʃka ˈsláːtina]; German: Rohitsch-Sauerbrunn) is a town in eastern Slovenia. It is the largest settlement in, and the seat of, the Municipality of Rogaška Slatina. It is known for its curative mineral water, spa, and crystal glass.

== Name ==
The name Rogaška Slatina literally means 'Rogatec springs', referring to a source of mineral water. The springs were dubbed Roitschocrene 'Rogatec springs' (< Greek κρήνη crene 'spring') in 1687 by Johann Benedikt Gründel. The settlement was known as Rohitsch-Sauerbrunn or Sauerbrunn Curort in German (and in older sources also Roitscher Sauerbrunn). Older sources also contain the Slovene names Slatina Zdravišče and Slatina Rogačka.

== History ==
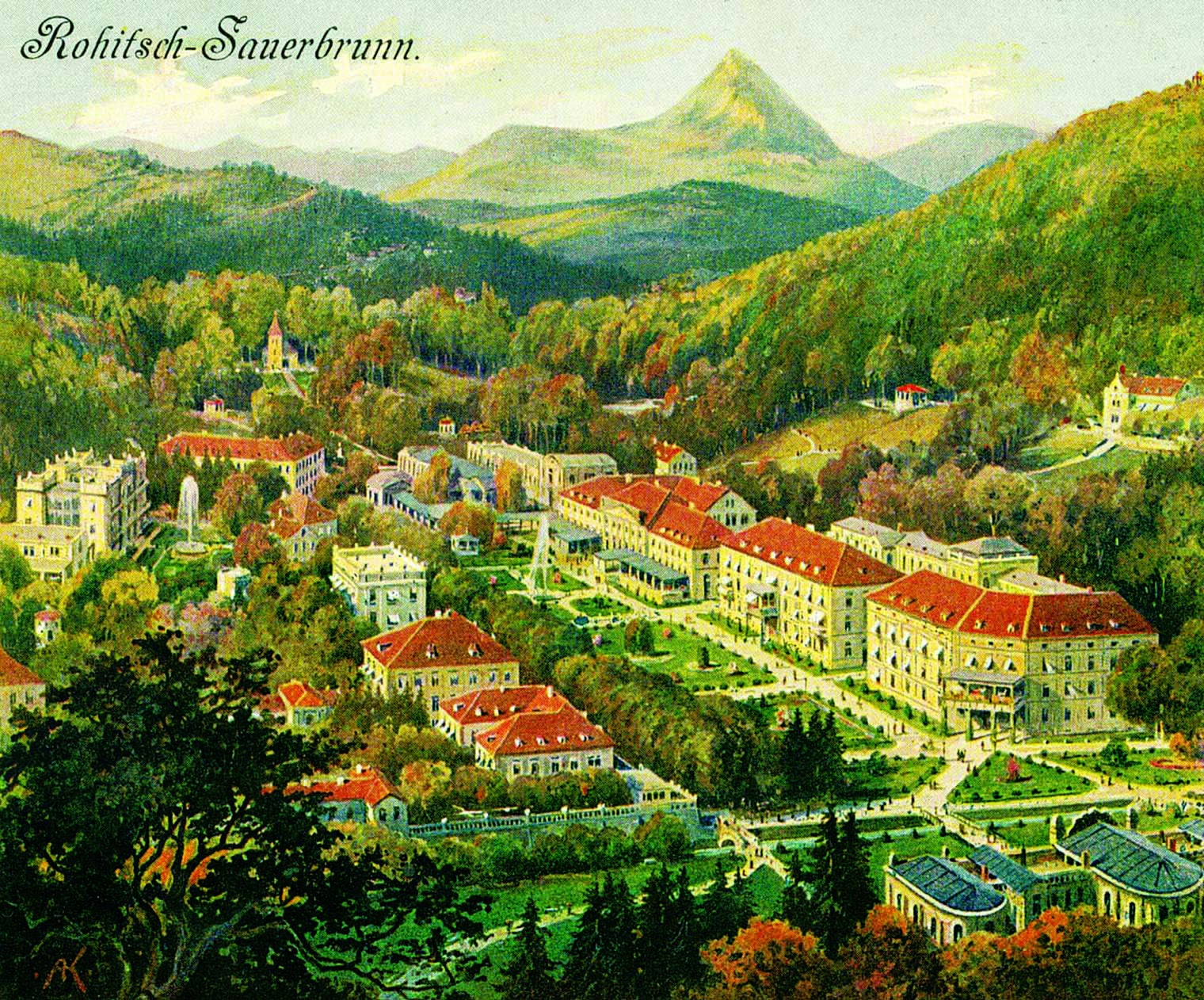
Rogaška Slatina on an early 20th-century postcard

The Rogaška Slatina area was inhabited in antiquity, and a Roman road led to the settlement. A document from the Archbishopric of Salzburg dating from 1141 mentions a Roman stone next to a spring in the settlement. The 16th-century alchemist Leonhard Thurneysser was the first to describe the spring. The spring was also described by the imperial physician Paul de Sorbait in 1679, by the Carniolan physician Marko Gerbec circa 1700, and by Joseph Karl Kindermann in his 1798 history of Styria (Repertorium der steiermärkischen Geschichte, Geographie, Topographie, Statistik und Naturhistorie). The historian Rudolf Gustav Puff described Rogaška Slatina in a special publication, and 24 lithographs of the town were created by the artist Josip Reiterer in the early 19th century. The chemist Adolf Režek set up a small chemistry laboratory in Rogaška Slatina in 1931 and published various material about the town.

=== World War II ===
Between 1941 and 1945, the Rogaška Slatina area was annexed by Nazi Germany. The Wehrmacht's 132nd infantry division entered the spa on April 11, 1941, only five days after the invasion of Yugoslavia. In the following weeks, the a complex administration was set up. Because of Rogaška Slatina's health and glassmaking importance, large accommodation capacity, and position along the German–Croatian state border on the Sotla River, it was transformed into one of the key outposts of annexed Lower Styrian territory.

=== Mass graves ===
Rogaška Slatina is the site of two known mass graves from the period immediately after the Second World War. The Sovinec Ravine Mass Grave (Slovene: Sovinčev graben) is located in the southeast part of the town, in a ravine above the railroad tracks. It contains the remains of 18 to 20 Croatians that were captured and then killed at the site in May and June 1945. The Flower Hill Mass Grave (Grobišče Cvetlični hrib) lies east of the town and is believed to occupy the entire ravine below the former Triglav Hotel. It contains the remains of an unknown number of victims murdered after the war and/or victims murdered by the Nazis during the war.

== Spa ==
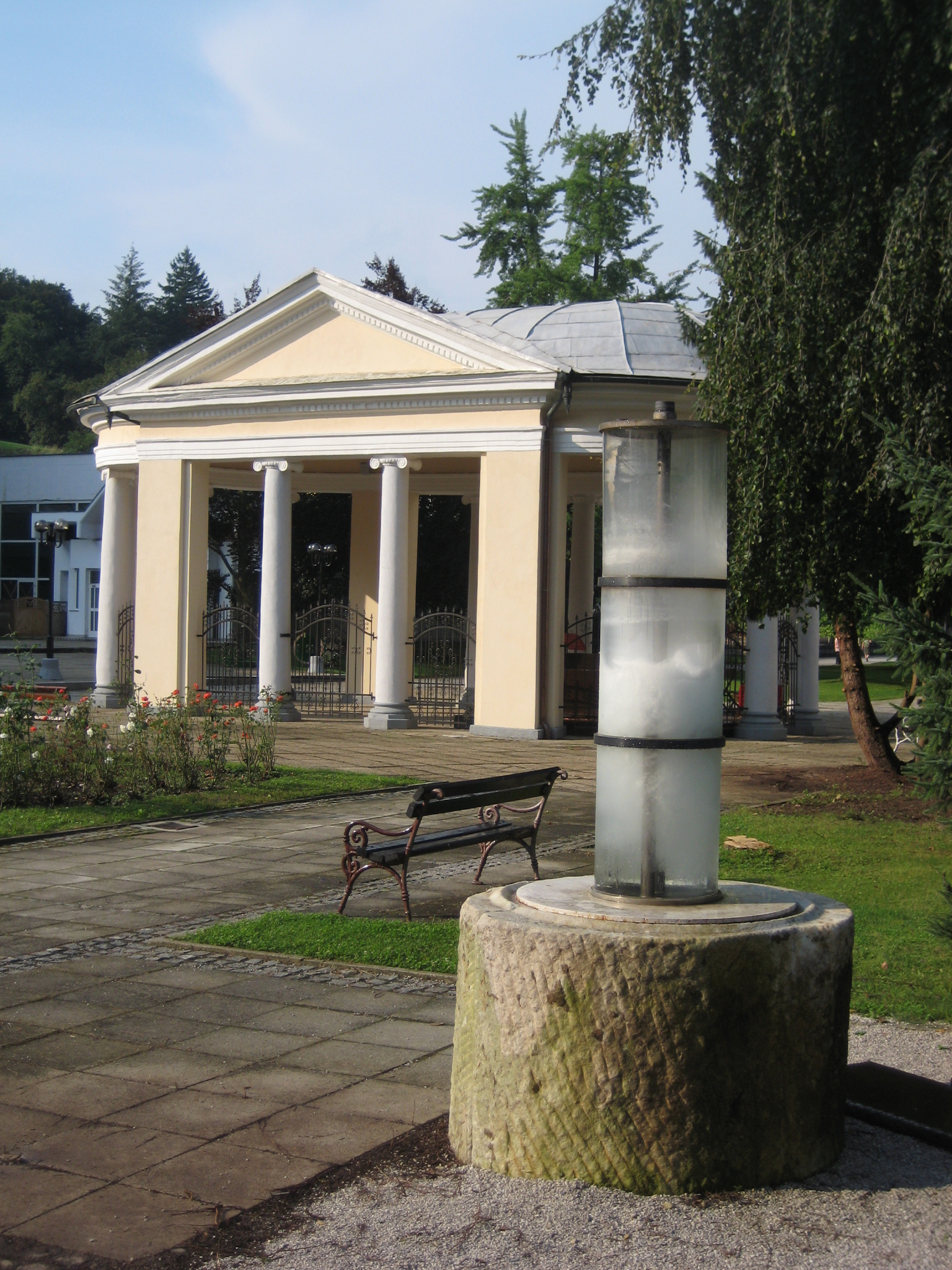
Donat and Tempel Pavilion

Rogaška Slatina is a synonym for health-resort tourism in Slovenia. For centuries the curative mineral water rich in magnesium (branded as Donat Mg), the picturesque countryside, and other local attractions have attracted visitors to the area. Roman inscriptions referring to the spa waters have been found. A wooden fence was built around the spring in the 17th century, and the water flowed through a wooden trough. The castle lord Peter de Curti built an inn at the site in 1676 and charged people to visit the springs. At that time the water was also bottled in bottles produced by a nearby glass works. The neoclassical Tempel Pavilion was built in 1819 and designed by Nikola Pertsch.

== Churches ==
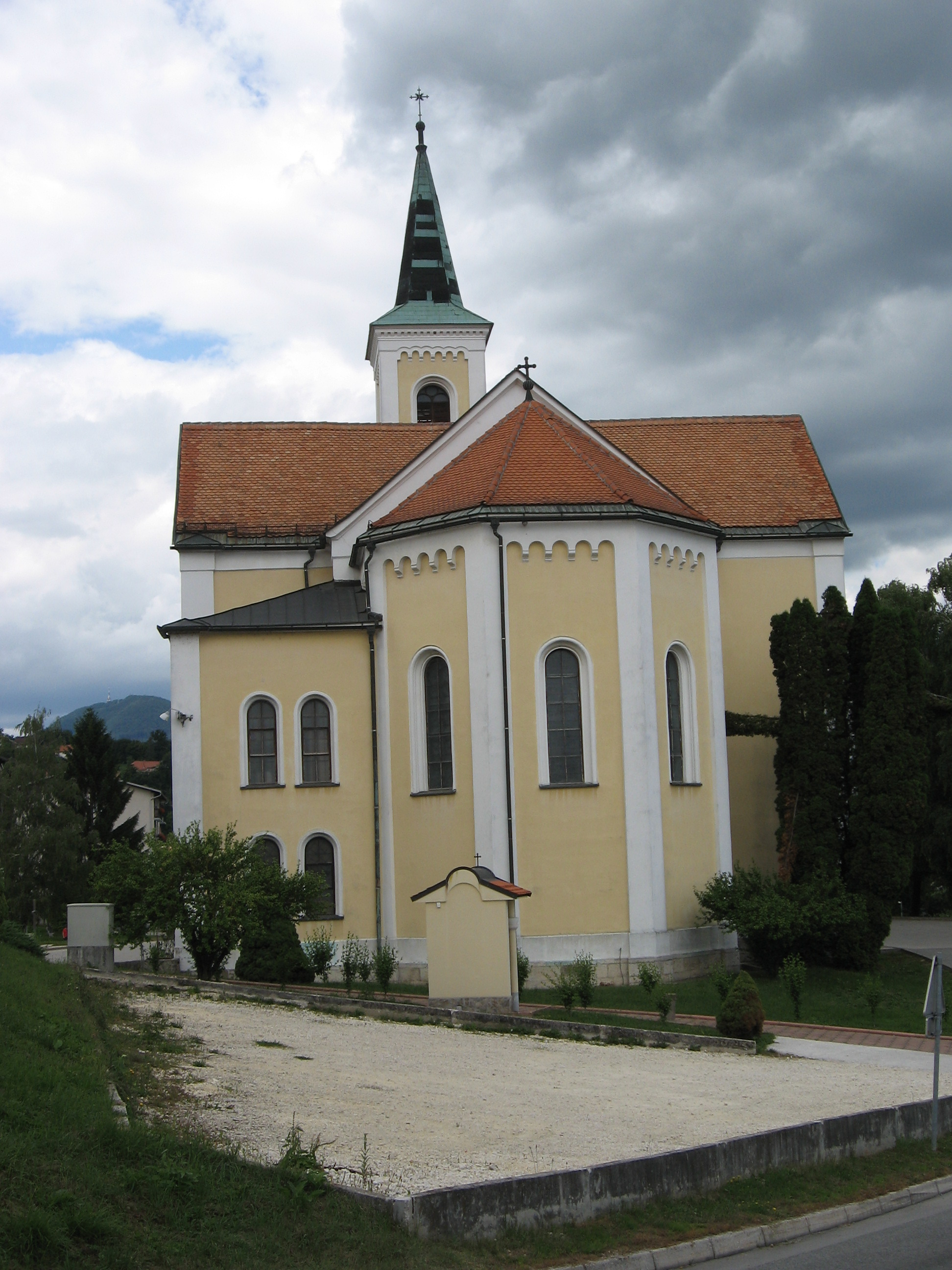
Holy Cross Parish Church

The parish church in the town is dedicated to the Holy Cross and belongs to the Roman Catholic Diocese of Celje. The current structure at the site was built between 1864 and 1866 in a Neo-Romanesque style. The earliest mention of a church at the site is in a manuscript from 1304, although the church predated that time. That building was Romanesque, and it was razed in 1863 to make way for today's church.

Another church, next to the village of Prnek, is dedicated to the Holy Trinity. It also belongs to the Parish of Rogaška Slatina. It was built in the 17th century and contains a gilded altar dating to between 1650 and 1675. The rest of the internal furnishings are from the 18th and 19th centuries.

== Notable people ==
Notable people that were born or lived in Rogaška Slatina include:

- Hilarij Froelich (1811–1878), medical writer
- Franjo Kolterer (1888–1964), medical writer
- Avgust Lavrenčič (1925–1996), painter and scenographer
- Ela Peroci (1922–2001), children's writer
- Miloš Verk (1890–1952), cartographer

== Demographics ==
Historical population
Year	1948	1953	1961	1971	1981	1991	2002	2011	2021
Pop.	986	1,311	1,445	1,830	4,457	4,922	4,801	5,111	5,082
±%	—	+33.0%	+10.2%	+26.6%	+143.6%	+10.4%	−2.5%	+6.5%	−0.6%
Population size may be affected by changes in administrative divisions.

== Gallery ==
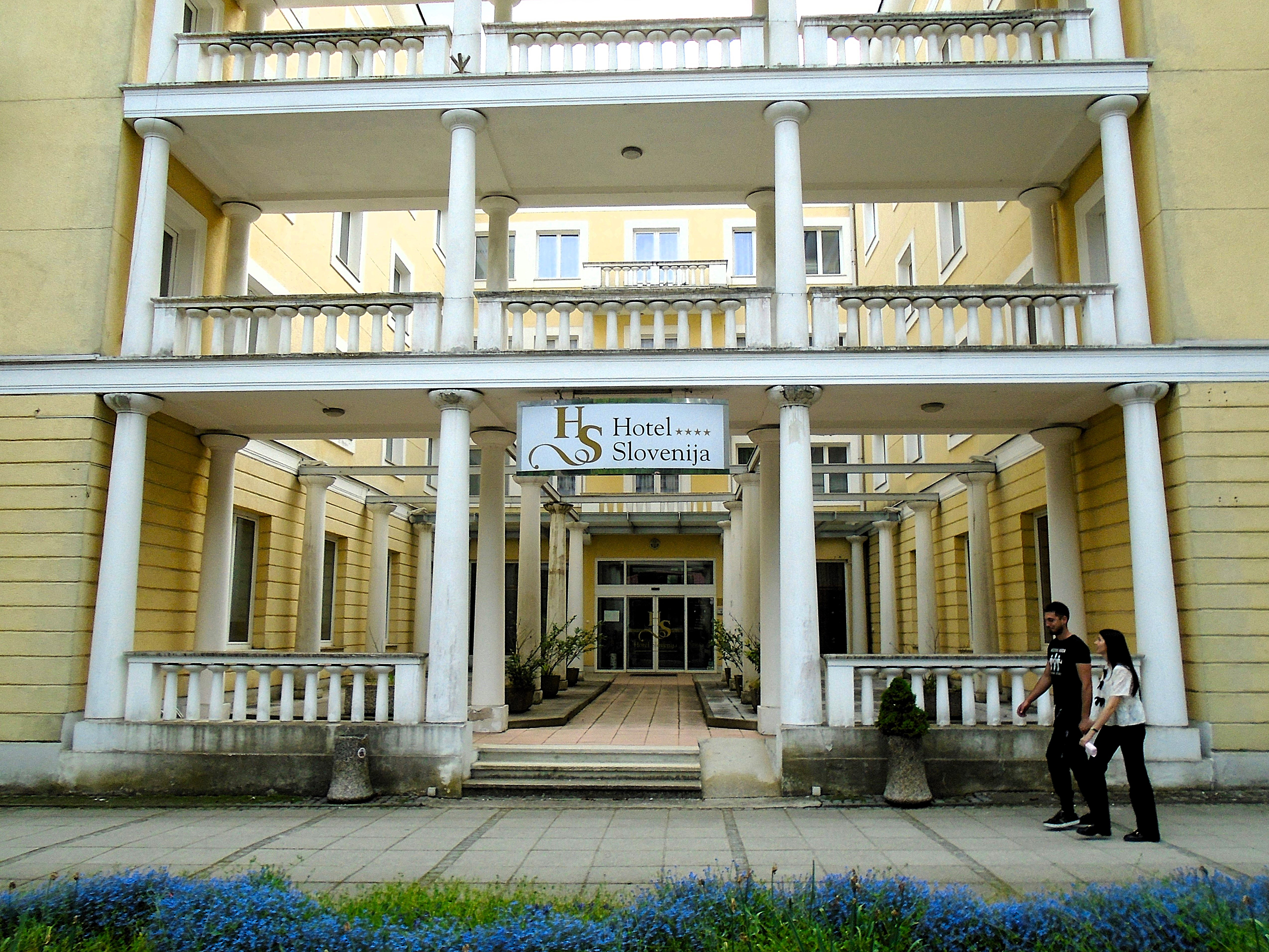
Slovenija Hotel

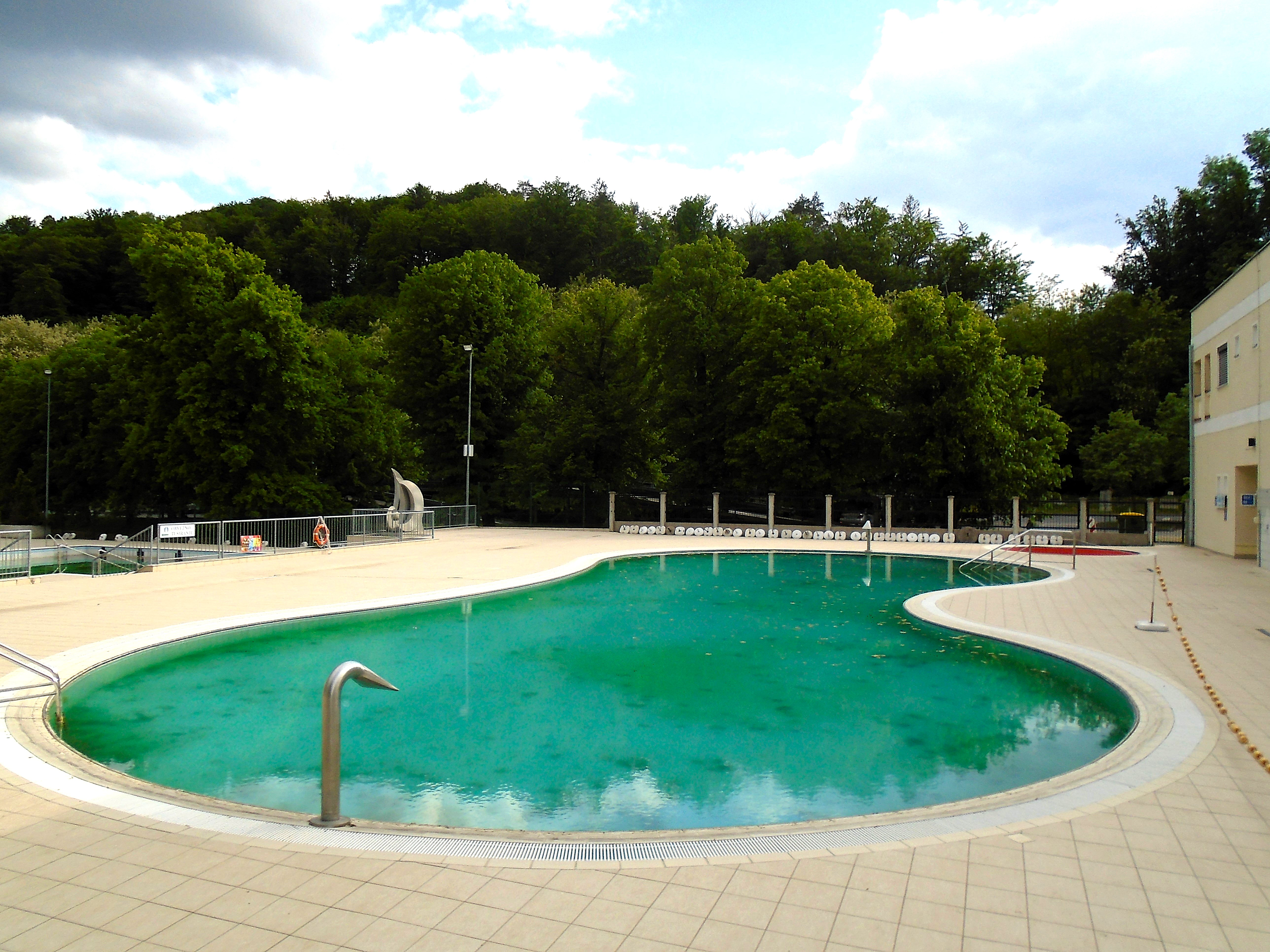
Round swimming pool

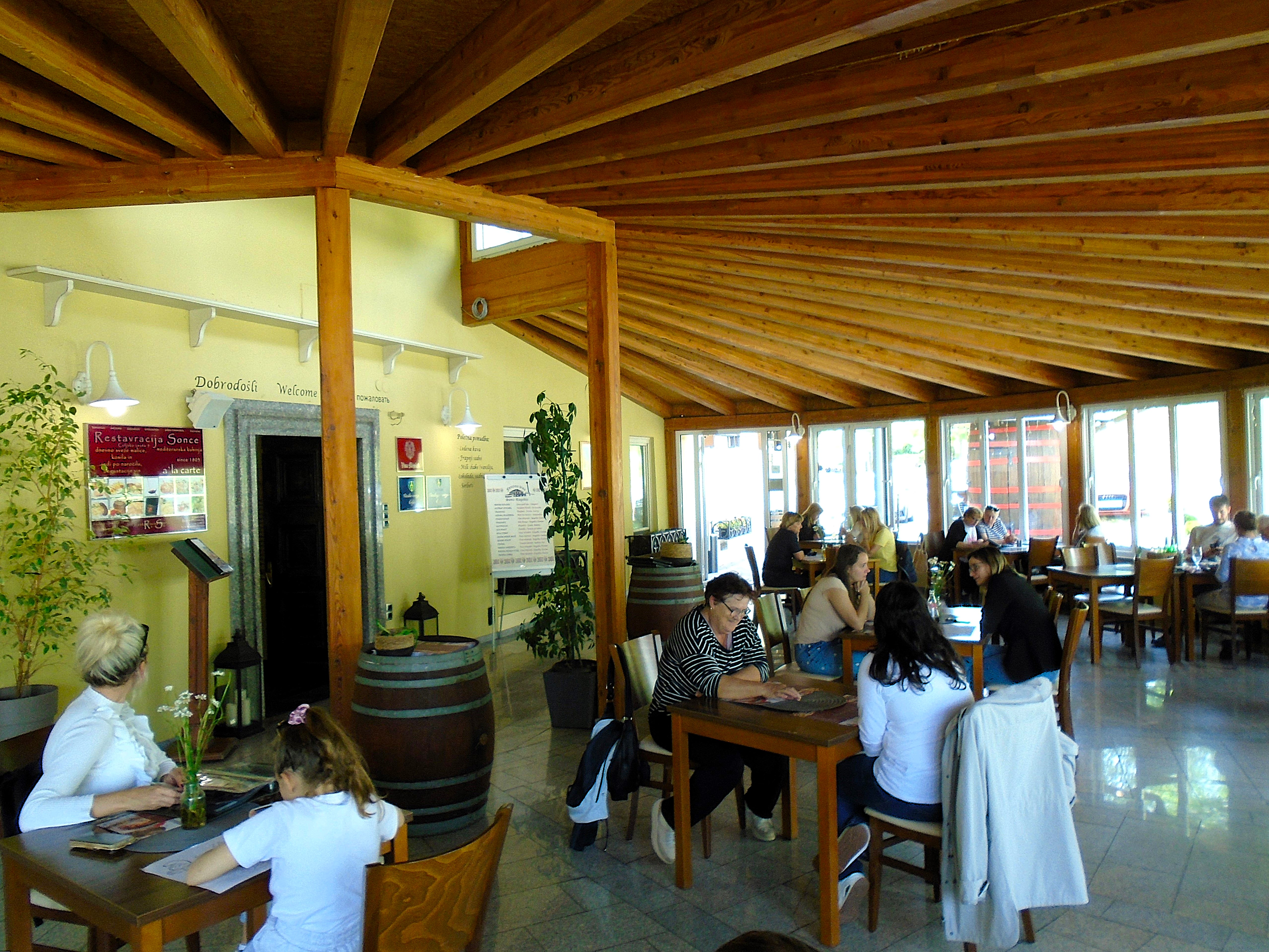
Sonce Restaurant interior
