= Emil Tedeschi =

Croatian entrepreneur

- Occupation: Entrepreneur
- Known for: Founder, and majority owner of the Atlantic Grupa

Emil Tedeschi (born 6 April 1967) is a Croatian entrepreneur, founder, and majority owner of the Atlantic Grupa.

== Early life and education ==
Tedeschi's family is originally from Venice, and his great-grandfather came to the island of Korčula as a merchant. Tesdeschi's father, Svetozar Emil Tedeschi, was a lawyer who worked in managerial positions in a couple of companies, but at the end of the 1980s he moved to Trieste where he started a trading company for small-border trade with an Italian partner. Mother Đurđica was a judge on Korčula and a judge of the Municipal Court in Zagreb, and today, in retirement, she is known as a fashion connoisseur.

He holds a degree in Economics and Management from ZSEM (Zagreb School of Economics and Management) and he studied in Università per i Stranieri di Perugia, Italy and INSEAD Fontainebleau, France. Today he is a Clinical Professor of Entrepreneurship and Strategy, as well as an Advisory Board Member of ZSEM.

== Career ==
Tedeschi started working in his father's company in Trieste in 1989. Then, he moved to Meteor Holding, a pulp and paper trading company in London. At 22, he became the director of the Milan branch.

In 1991, he founded Atlantic Trade independently, starting with six employees from the Zagreb branch of Meteor Holding. The company initially grew by selling Wrigley chewing gum and Ferrero chocolate bars. Atlantic Trade expanded through strategic acquisitions, including Cedevita and Neva from Pliva and later the Slovenian company Droga Kolinska for 382 million euros in 2010. This purchase was funded by the company's own money, bank loans, and mezzanine financing from the European Bank for Reconstruction and Development.

Tedeschi's business has 5,400 employees and generates over 900 million euros in revenue annually. Additionally, he owns the private chain of pharmacies, Farmacia.

He was named manager of the year in 2002 by the Croatian Association of Managers (CROMA), and in 2005 by the business magazine Privredni vjesnik. In 2006, he was chosen by the expert jury of Kapital Network as a businessman of the year.

From 2005 to 2007, he was the president of the Croatian Association of Employers and a member of the Economic and Social Council. He is also a member of the Trilateral Commission. He is the honorary consul of Ireland in the Republic of Croatia, and a member of the Harvard Kennedy School Dean's Council, the INSEAD Alumni Association, the Programme Council of the ZSEM, the Business Council at the Faculty of Economics in Ljubljana, as well as the Council of the University of Rijeka. Also, Tedeschi is a chairman of the Ernst and Young Entrepreneur of the Year award jury in Croatia.

In 2010, he received the award "Večernjak pečat" as the businessman of the year in the region of Southeast Europe, and the state decoration of the Order of Danica Hrvatska with the image of Blaž Lorković for special services to the economy.

From 2010 to 2015, he was a member of the Economic Council of the President of the Republic. In 2011, he was awarded the honorary "Heart of Sarajevo" for his long-term support of the Sarajevo Film Festival.

== Personal life ==
Tedeschi is married to Maja Tedeschi. They have two children.

He is the owner of the basketball club Cedevita Junior and the president of the basketball club Cedevita Olimpija in Ljubljana.
