= Stolypin International Institute of Informatization and Public Administration =

Russian research institute

Stolypin International Institute
- МИИГУ им. П.А. Столыпина
- Motto: Science and Education for the Peace and Sustainable Development in the Worldwide!
- Type: Unitary
- Established: 1998
- Affiliations: Russian Association of Legal Education, Russian Association of Culture and Arts Employers
- Location: Moscow, Russia
- Campus: Urban
- Website: miigu.ru

Stolypin International Institute of Informatization and Public Administration (Stolypin International Institute) is a scientific and educational International non-governmental organization with the head office in Moscow, Russia and representative offices in Geneva, Switzerland and Vienna, Austria.

== International work and recognition ==
Stolypin International Institute, as an organisation that has special competence and known within the fields, was granted the Special Consultative Status with the United Nations Economic and Social Council in the 2019 and was recognized and put on consular records at the Ministry of Foreign Affairs of the Russian Federation.

== National work and recognition ==
Stolypin International Institute is the innovation platform of the State Russian Academy of Educational Sciences, Stolypin International Institute holds a state federal licence to conduct higher education in Russian Federation, accredited by the Ministry of Labour and Social Protection of the Russian Federation.

Even though organization is small, it conducts scientific researches on the important fields which are financed from private sector and governmental funds, including the grant of the President of the Russian Federation.

Institute have representatives in most authoritative expert commissions before governmental bodies including: Federal Assembly of the Russian Federation, Ministry of Justice of the Russian Federation, Civic Chamber of the Russian Federation, Federal Chamber of Culture of the Russian Federation, Moscow State Duma.

Early Institute conducts 6 scientific conferences. Each year approximately 1000 articles are published.

Even though organization conduct researches and prepares specialists on the corruption counteraction, human rights protection and other fields there are a number of known cases when on local and municipal government level rights of the Institute have been violated and abused.
