= Davor Užbinec =

Croatian business manager and basketball executive

- Occupations: business manager; basketball executive
- Basketball career

Career history

Playing
- Medveščak

Coaching
- Medveščak

Davor Užbinec is a Croatian business manager and professional basketball executive, currently serving as the general manager of Slovenian club KK Cedevita Olimpija.

Užbinec was a general manager of a Croatian club Cedevita, from 2015 to 2019.

== Business career ==
During his business career, Užbinec worked for Rotoplast, Bakrotisak, HON-ING, La log, and Lura. In the Atlantic Grupa he worked for twelve years.

== Basketball executive career ==
=== KK Cedevita (2005–2019) ===
Užbinec joined Zagreb-based basketball club Cedevita in 2005 as a board member. In 2010, he became a vice president of the club. In October 2015, Užbinec was named the general manager of the club, right after then-general manager Krešimir Novosel became the manager for the Adriatic Basketball Association.

During his tenure as the club's general manager, Cedevita won three Croatian League championships (2016, 2017, and 2018) and four Krešimir Ćosić Cup tournaments (2016, 2017, 2018, and 2019).

=== KK Cedevita Olimpija (2019–present) ===
In July 2019, Užbinec became the first general manager of Cedevita Olimpija, a newly-formed basketball club based in Ljubljana, Slovenia.

Sporting positions
First	General Manager of KK Cedevita Olimpija; 2019–present	Incumbent
Preceded by Krešimir Novosel	General Manager of KK Cedevita; 2015–2019	Succeeded by Tomislav Zebić as GM of Cedevita Junior
