= Openad =

Former online marketplace

OpenAd.net was an online marketplace for buying and selling creative ideas for use in advertising, marketing and design. The core of its services was giving idea buyers (marketers, advertisers) direct access to a variety of unpublished ideas offered to them by over 11,500 freelance "creatives" from 125 countries worldwide.

The whole process of buying ideas takes place on-line, directly between advertisers/marketers and creatives, disintermediating agencies in the process. Clients have the option of setting a pitch deadline and a license price for pitched ideas, while creatives have the option of setting a licensing price for ideas in the Gallery. Clients receive on average from 20 to 100 creative solutions and can decide to license one, more or none of the ideas proposed. Marketers pay $3,000 to $100,000 to post "briefs" describing proposed assignments on its Web site. Ideas accepted by clients are subject to negotiation with the creator, with OpenAd.net collecting a 22½% commission on the transaction.

OpenAd.net has been used by mainstream advertising purchasers such as FHM, which has used the service three times for various campaigns.

As of January 2, 2010 public records indicate OpenAd.net website is no longer available.

== User accounts ==
The OpenAd.net website offered two types of user accounts for:

- Creatives (Sellers): Sellers' accounts enable creatives to upload their ideas to the Gallery or respond to clients’ briefs. Registration is free of charge for creatives. Students also have a chance to compete in the OpenAd Talent pitches.
- Buyers (Clients): Clients' account privileges depend on the chosen Membership package. The annual Membership fee depends on:
  - The number of online briefs the client wishes to post
  - The number of Gallery categories the clients wishes to have access to
  - The number of user accounts desired.

== History ==
The author of the idea is Vital Verlic, who established the company in 2003. The majority stake of OpenAd AG in Switzerland is owned by a Slovenian holding company Istrabenz, which backed the project in 2004. OpenAd.net is managed by Katarina Skoberne, a former television and advertising executive in Slovenia.

OpenAd.net's subsidiaries are in New York (OpenAd Inc.), London (OpenAd UK Ltd) and Ljubljana (OpenAd d.o.o), with representatives in Sydney and Buenos Aires. In 2006, OpenAd.net was nominated for the Webby Awards in the "Best service" category.

== Case studies ==
- Ontrac Global
- AC Intercar
- Etam
- Emap
- Lastminute.com

== Sources ==
- AdAge
- Campaign Brief
- Campaign Magazine
- The Independent
- International Herald Tribune
- Webby awards
- Bizcommunity
