= Cockta =

Slovenian soft drink

- Type: Soft drink
- Manufacturer: Droga Kolinska d.d.
- Origin: Yugoslavia (now Slovenia)
- Introduced: 8 March 1953; 73 years ago
- Flavor: Rose hip, lemon and orange
- Website: www.cockta.eu

Cockta (pronounced [ˈkòːkta]) is a soft drink from Slovenia. Its main ingredient comes from dog rose hip; the other ingredients come from 11 different herbs, lemon, orange, and caramel coloring. Its original variant contains neither caffeine nor orthophosphoric acid.

== Origins ==
The origins of the Cockta drink begin in the early 1950s. In 1952, Ivan Deu, the Director of the state-owned corporation Slovenijavino, came up with the idea of producing an original, refreshing Slovenian beverage which would be able to compete against soft drinks from abroad (particularly Coca-Cola), which were not yet being sold in Yugoslavia. The chemical engineer, Emerik Zelinka, an employee of the Slovenijavino research labs, created the drink with a new, different taste, derived from an undisclosed blend of eleven different herbs and spices; including the rose hip, a prominent flavour within Cockta's blend. The drink was introduced to the market for the first time on 8 March 1953 at a ski jumping competition at Planica.

== Ownership ==
In 2000, the Cockta brand was bought by the Kolinska food company, known today as Droga Kolinska d.d. In mid-2010, Croatian holding company Atlantic Grupa d.d. acquired Droga Kolinska.

== Sales ==
In the first year of production, four million Cockta bottles were sold in Slovenia alone. Ten years later, sales climbed to 71 million. From Slovenia, Cockta spread across the common market of the other republics of Yugoslavia, but no dedicated bottling facilities were established.

== Marketing ==
The initial Cockta launch and marketing campaign was carefully designed. The first bottle and label for Cockta was created by Sergej Pavlin, then a young architecture student. Pavlin also designed other aspects of the brand's visual image, including the design for Cockta delivery trucks and cardboard packaging for Cockta's bottles.

The original Cockta marketing campaign featured a suntanned young woman, with a hairstyle considered trendy at the time, in a ponytail, with blue eyes, holding in her hands a bottle of the new beverage. The sports event at Planica where Cockta was launched was the earliest form of sports sponsorship in Slovenia.

In 2006, Cockta sponsored the MaxCards World Championships, held in Ljubljana.

In 2013, survey conducted by Valicon placed Cockta 6th in a list of the top 25 strongest brands in Slovenia. Brand strength was calculated based on brand awareness, experience and usage.

In 2019, "Cockta Free" came onto the market, with this variant containing no added sugar. Cockta is available in 275ml glass bottles, 330ml cans, 0.5 liter and 1.5 liter plastic bottles. Cockta Free is available in 275ml glass bottles, 330ml cans, 0.5 liter and 1.5 liter plastic bottles.

In 2023, Cockta's version of an orangeade launched, called "Cockta Blondie,” and a later flavor in 2026 called “Cockta Lime.”

=== Slogans ===
- 1980 - Pijača vaše in naše mladosti (The Drink Of Your Youth and Ours)
- 1983 - Še vedno najboljša (Still the Best)
- 2001 - Prve ne pozabiš nikoli (You Never Forget Your First one)
- 2002 - Cockte pogrešam (I Miss Cockta; homophone: phonetically read as "How Much I Miss You" when translated)
- 2005 - Ješ MaxCards, Spiš MaxCards, Piješ Cockto! (You Eat MaxCards, You Sleep MaxCards, You Drink Cockta!)
- Brez kofeina - brez kisline - brez heca! (No Caffeine - No Sour Taste - No Kidding!)
- 2012 - Osveži življenje (Freshen [your] life)
- 2018 - Cockta za vedno (Cockta Forever)

== Gallery ==
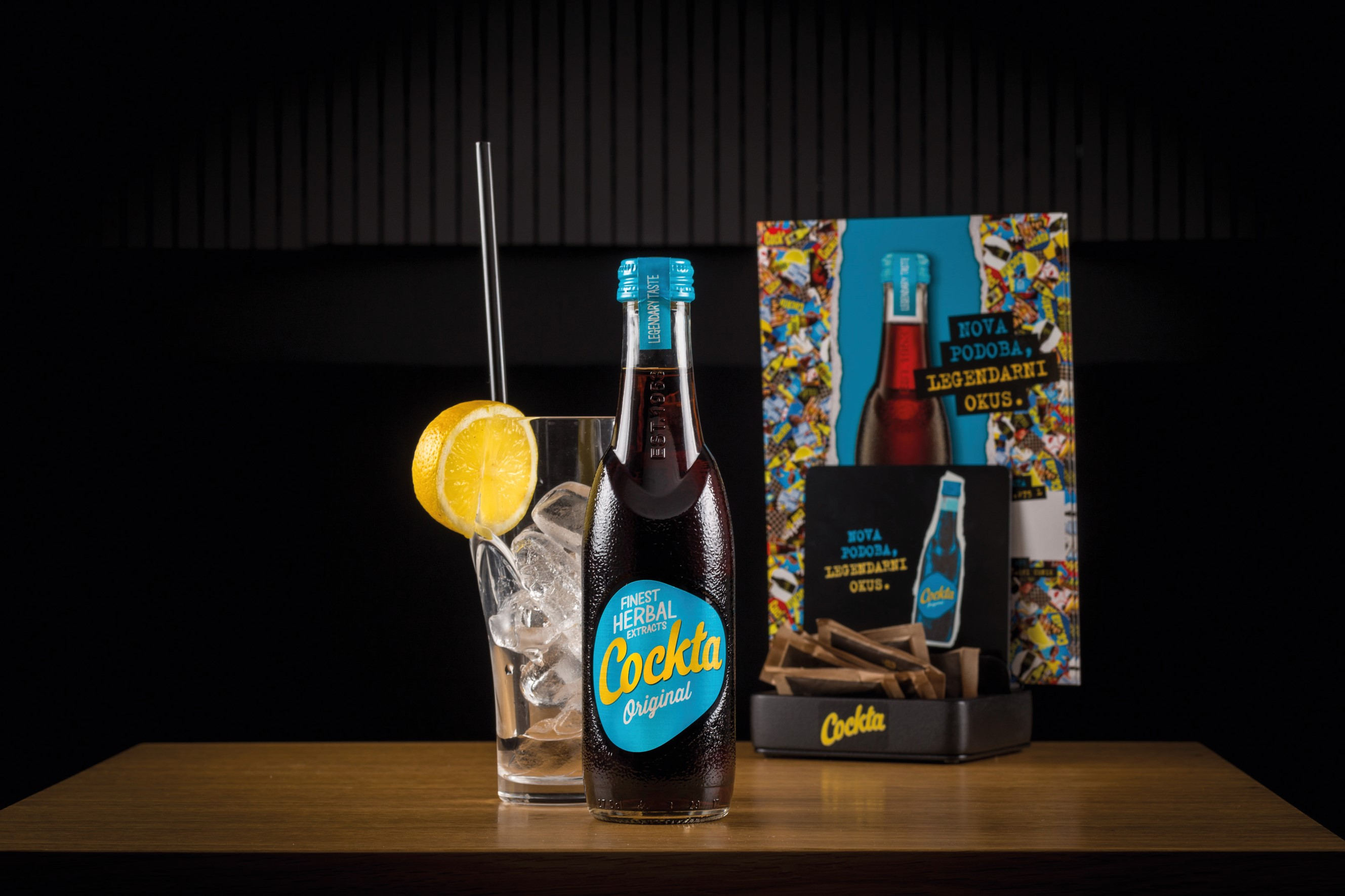
Cockta since 2018

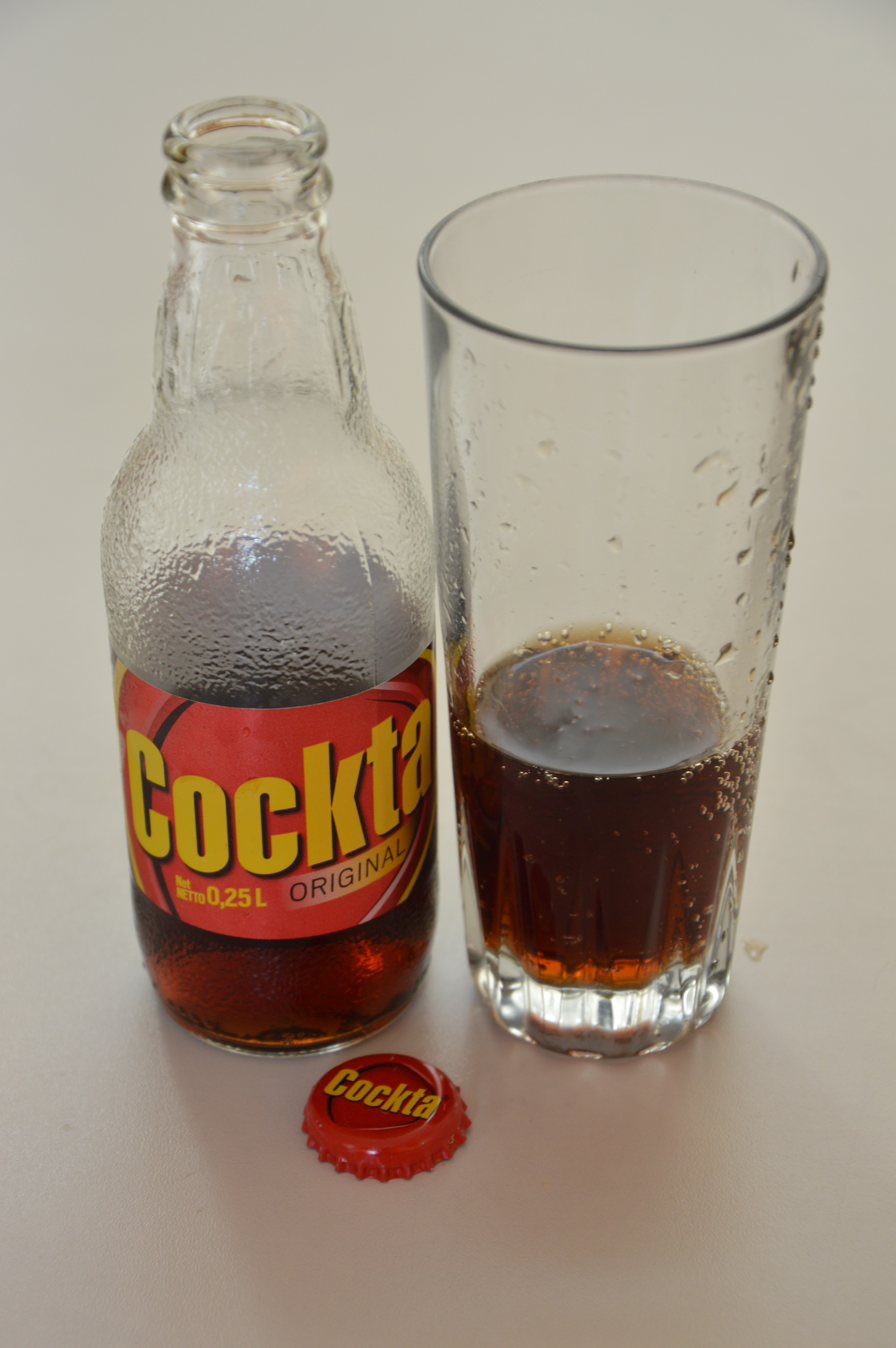
Cockta from 2015

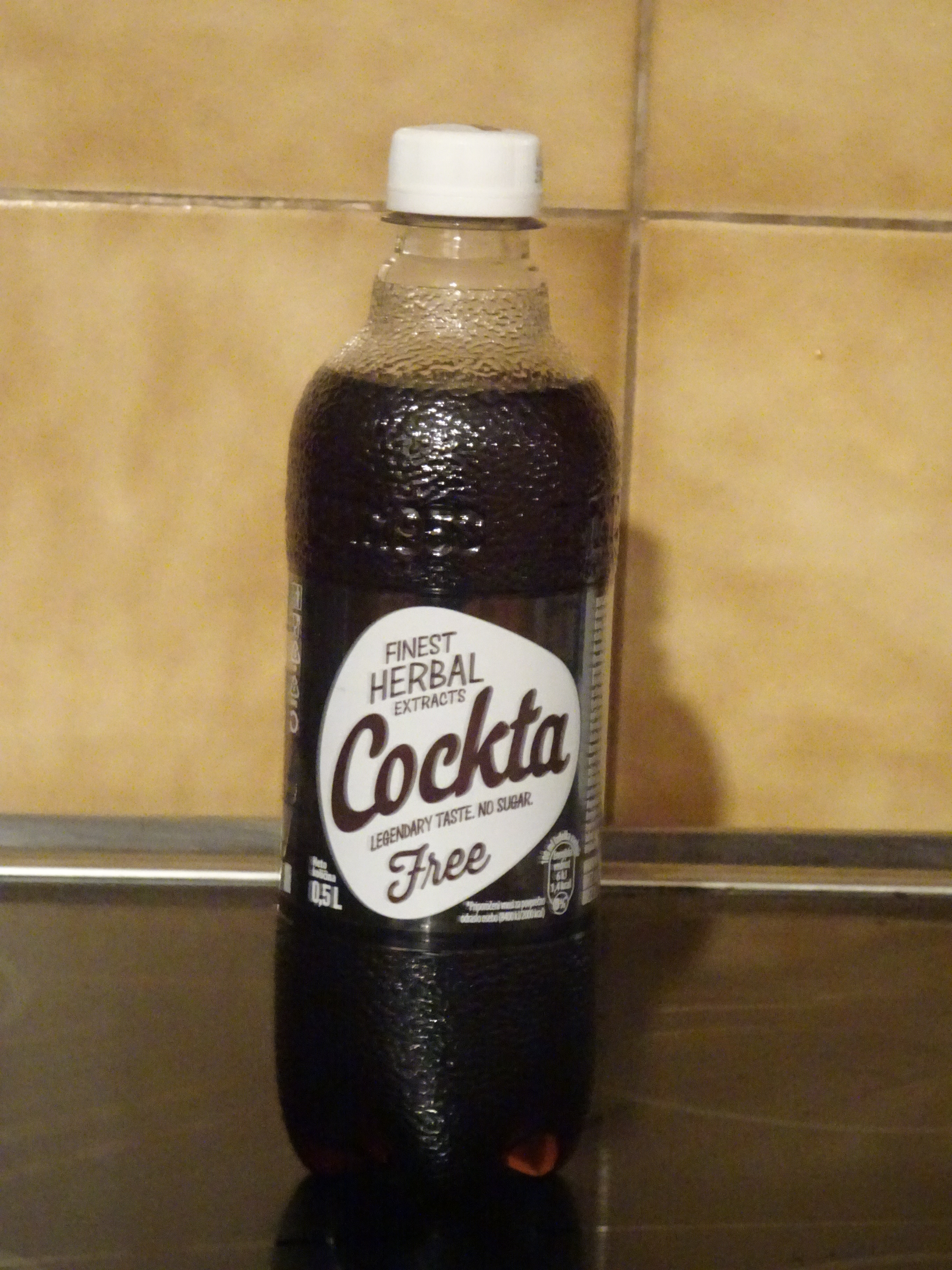
Cockta Free from 2019

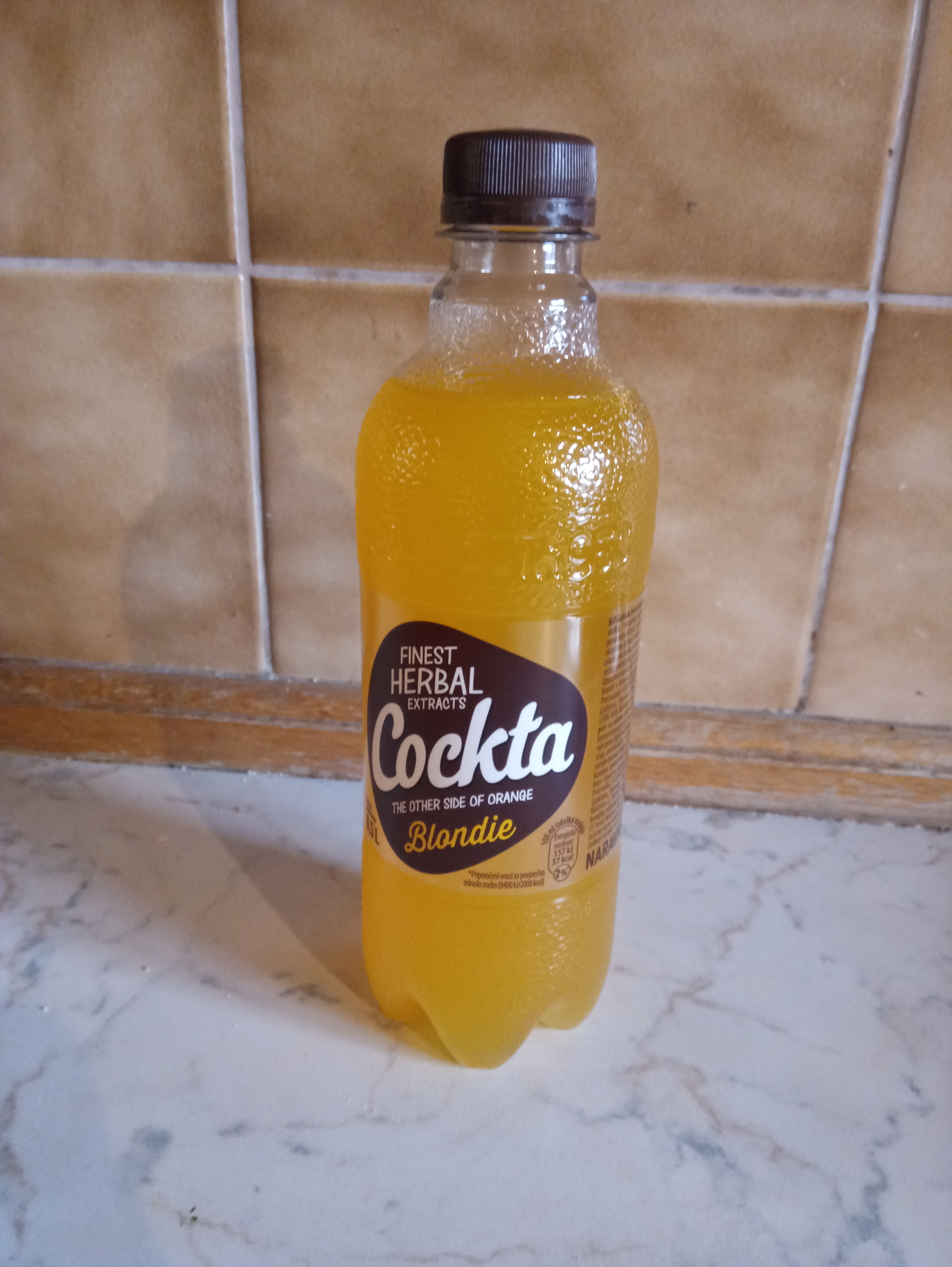
Cockta Blondie from 2022

== See also ==
- Polo-Cockta, a drink brand in Poland
