= Atlantic Grupa =

Croatian public limited company

Atlantic Grupa d.d.
- Type: Public
- Traded as: ZSE: ATGR
- ISIN: HRATGRRA0003
- Industry: Fast moving consumer goods, production and distribution
- Founded: 1991; 35 years ago
- Founder: Emil Tedeschi
- Headquarters: Zagreb, Croatia
- Key people: Emil Tedeschi (CEO); Zoran Stanković, Neven Vranković, Lada Tedeschi Fiorio, Srećko Nakić, Enzo Smrekar (Members of Management Board)
- Revenue: ▲€1.19 billion (2025)
- Operating income: 44,680,000 euro (2023)
- Net income: ▲€106 million (2025)
- Total assets: ▲€907.7 million (2023)
- Total equity: ▲€446.3 million (2023)
- Owner: EMyberg d.o.o (50.2%); Lada Tedeschi Fiorio (5.8%); Pension Funds (35.3%); Others (as of 31 December 2023)
- Number of employees: 5,354 (2023)
- Website: www.atlantic.hr/en

Atlantic Grupa d.d. is a Croatian multinational company whose business operations include the production, development, sales and distribution of consumer goods with simultaneous market presence in over 40 countries around the world.

Atlantic Grupa is one of the leading FMCG companies in the region. Its primary activities comprise the production and distribution of food products, including sports nutrition products and dietary supplements. Additionally, Atlantic Grupa is also a manufacturer of over-the-counter drug medicines and the company also operates the Farmacia chain of pharmacies. Finally, Atlantic Grupa has a regional and international distribution network through which, in addition to its range of brands, it also distributes a range of products from external partners.

The company's headquarters are in Zagreb, while 17 production facilities are located in Croatia, Slovenia, Bosnia and Herzegovina, Serbia and North Macedonia. Atlantic Grupa owns companies and representative offices in 10 countries.

== History ==
=== 1991–2001: Foundation and domestic expansion ===
The beginning of Atlantic Grupa dates back to 1991 when Atlantic Trade d.o.o., a company for distribution of consumer goods, was founded. In the following years, the company grew into a national distributor with distribution centres in Zagreb, Split, Rijeka and Osijek and a distribution portfolio from principals such as Wrigley, Procter & Gamble, Johnson & Johnson, etc.

In 1991, Atlantic Trade was incorporated and the development of consumer goods distribution started across Croatia.

In 1997, the company invested in the "Ataco" distribution system in Bosnia & Herzegovina. In 1998, Atlantic Grupa launched the first Croatian ready-made sandwich for broad distribution named Montana.

=== 2001–present: Regional expansion ===
With the opening of the representative office in Bosnia & Herzegovina in 2001 the company became a regional company, which was in later years followed by own distribution companies in Serbia, North Macedonia and Slovenia. In addition to being a distribution company, with the acquisition of Cedevita d.o.o. in 2001, Atlantic Grupa also became a production company.

In 2001, Atlantic Grupa acquired Croatian instant vitamin drink producer Cedevita d.o.o. In the following year, it incorporated Atlantic Grupa d.o.o.

In 2003, it acquired Croatian cosmetics company Neva d.o.o. It also started up a distribution company Atlantic Trade Skopje d.o.o. In 2004, the Croatian manufacturer of all-purpose skin and lip balm Melem, was purchased in the same year.

In 2005, Atlantic Grupa acquired German sports food producer Multipower, which marked the first acquisition outside of former Yugoslavia. In 2006, the company established a representative office in Moscow. In the same year, the company was transformed into a joint stock company.

In 2007, it purchased Fidifarm, leading Croatian producer of OTC medicines Also, it acquired Serbian instant vitamin drink producer Multivita d.o.o., thus cementing leadership status in the region in the industry of vitamin drinks. In the same year, after the implementation of the initial public offering of shares, Atlantic Grupa d.d. was listed on the official market of the Zagreb Stock Exchange.

In 2008 the company started to acquire pharmacy institutions and form its own pharmacy chain Farmacia. In 2010, it purchased Droga Kolinska, the leading Slovenian food producer, for 382 million euros. The acquisition of Kalničke Vode Bio Natura d.d. came in the same year.

In 2013, the company established a collaboration with Unilever. In 2015, Atlantic Grupa acquired Foodland, Serbian producer of homemade fruit and vegetable products e.g. jams, juices

== Organisation ==
=== Organisational structure ===
The business organisation of Atlantic Grupa comprises two basic segments:

- Business operations of Atlantic Grupa may be followed through business activities of special business units related to individual product type, and special sales units which cover all major markets as well as strategic sales channels.
- Corporate support functions are centrally organised and, depending on their respective functional area, provide support to the development and management of the entire Atlantic Grupa.

=== Corporate government ===
Atlantic Grupa's corporate management structure is based on a dual system consisting of the company's Supervisory Board and Management Board. Together with the General Assembly, a body in which shareholders accomplish their rights in Company matters, they represent the three principal bodies of the company.

==== Management board ====
Atlantic Grupa's management board is composed of the president and CEO, vice president for finance, vice president for corporate affairs, vice president for strategy, business development and growth, vice president for distribution and vice president for savoury spreads, Donat Mg and international expansion. Alongside the management board operates the Strategic Management Council, which represents a multifunctional body dealing with vital strategic and operational corporate issues.

- Emil Tedeschi: president of the management board
- Zoran Stanković: vice president for finance
- Neven Vranković: vice president for corporate affairs
- Lada Tedeschi Fiorio: group vice president for strategy, business development and growth
- Srećko Nakić: group vice president for distribution
- Enzo Smrekar: group vice president for savoury spreads, Donat Mg and international expansion

==== Supervisory board ====
Supervisory board of Atlantic Grupa comprises seven members, representatives of the academic and business community as well as shareholders. Members of supervisory board are:

- Zdenko Adrović: president
- Siniša Petrović: deputy of the president of the supervisory board
- Lars Peter Elam Håkansson: member
- Franz-Josef Flosbach: member
- Saša Pekač: member
- Anja Svetina Nabergoj: member

== Brands ==
=== Atlantic's brands ===
Atlantic Grupa develops its brands in 6 strategic business units (SBU): beverages, coffee, snacks, savoury spreads, pharma and personal care, and sports and functional food

- Beverages
  Cedevita
  Multivita
  Cockta
  Donat Mg
  Kala
  Kalnička
- Coffee
  Barcaffè
  Grand kafa
  Bonito
- Snacks
  Smoki
  Najlepše želje
  Bananica
  Chipsos
  Prima
  Sweet
  Štark waffles
  Štark cookies
- Savoury spreads
  Argeta
  Argeta Exclusive
  Argeta Junior
  Argeta Delight
  Granny's Secret
  Amfissa
  Montana
- Pharma and personal care
  Farmacia
  Dietpharm
  Fidifarm
  Bebi
  Bebi premium
- Sports and functional foods
  Multipower
  Champ
  Multaben

=== Principals' brands ===
Atlantic Grupa distributes the entire product range from Atlantic's own production and the assortment of external principals. In Croatia, Serbia, Slovenia, North Macedonia, Russia and Austria, Atlantic owns its own distribution companies while distribution in B&H and Montenegro is organised in cooperation with the partner company Ataco.

Atlantic Grupa's portfolio is approximately 70% Atlantic's brands, with the rest being principals' brands.

- Distribution
  Unilever
  Ferrero
  Hipp
  Johnson & Johnson
  Mars
  Nestle
  Red Bull
  Duracell
  Wrigley
  SAB Miller
  Schwartau
  Suntory Global Spirits
  Vitamin Well
