= Hipp =

Hipp is a surname. Notable people with the surname include:

- Bryan Hipp (1968–2006), extreme metal guitarist
- Christopher Hipp (1961–2009), inventor of the blade server
- D. Richard Hipp (born 1961), American free software programmer
- Hanna Hipp, Polish lyric mezzo-soprano
- Hans Hipp
- James William Hipp (born 1934), American music educator
- Joe Hipp (born 1962), U.S. professional boxer
- John Hipp, American criminologist
- Josef Hipp (1927–1959), German Olympic athlete
- Jutta Hipp (1925–2003), German-born jazz pianist and painter
- I. M. Hipp (born 1956), American football running back
- Matthäus Hipp (1813–1893), German clock maker, inventor of Hipp-Toggle
- Michal Hipp (born 13 March 1963), Slovak footballer and manager
- Paul Hipp (born 1963), American actor, singer, songwriter and filmmaker
- Van Hipp Jr. (born 1960), chairman of the South Carolina Republican Party

== See also ==
- Hipp Holding, a German-Swiss baby food manufacturer.
- Health Insurance Premium Payment Program (HIPP)
