= Cedevita =

Croatian company producing a wide range of drinks

Cedevita d.o.o.
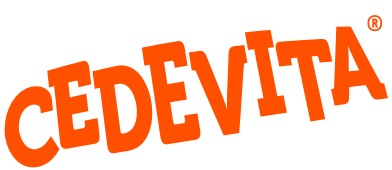
- Type: Subsidiary
- Industry: Beverage
- Founded: 1929
- Headquarters: Zagreb, Croatia
- Products: Drink mixes, soft vitamin drinks
- Number of employees: cca 500
- Parent: Atlantic Grupa
- Website: www.cedevita.com

Cedevita d.o.o. is a Croatian company which produces a wide range of instant drinks, and dietetic products. A notable owner of the company was the Croatian pharmaceutical company Pliva d.d. Since 2001, Cedevita has been part of the Atlantic Grupa.

== Background and history ==
Cedevita began production in 1929 in Borongaj, Zagreb (where the main factory still operates) as a branch of the Swiss company Wander AG to produce dietetic products. In 1947, a new facility was built in Trogir for processing of plants and manufacturing of teas. The company sponsors KK Cedevita Olimpija, a basketball club in Ljubljana, Slovenia.

== Cedevita instant vitamin drinks ==
The first instant vitamin drink (orange flavored) was created in 1969. However, production did not start until 1970. In 1985, the company launched the lemon flavor drink, and in 1990, grapefruit. Wild berry and apple flavours were introduced in 1999. Other flavors include tropical fuit and mandarin. A sugar-free version was introduced in 1985. A product line called "Cedevita Junior" was designed for children, with a higher percentage of vitamins and minerals.

According to data published by Atlantic Grupa, Cedevita is Atlantic's best-selling brand. Cedevita is in the Consumer Healthcare Division, accounting for 24% of the sales.

=== Market position ===
Cedevita d.o.o. has a leading position (over 50% of the market) in the segment of instant vitamin drinks on the Croatian market and in Bosnia and Herzegovina, Slovenia, and Serbia.

== Product line ==
- Cedevita (instant drink)
- Vitamin enriched candies (product lines include: Cedevita, Pepermint, Rondo C, and Vau Vau)
- Teas (Cedevita brand name)
- Dietetic products (Naturavita brand name)
- Rondosept (pastilles prescribed for oral inflammation and pharyngitis)
- Rehidromiks (pastilles for acute or chronic diarrhea).
