= Representative office =

A representative office is an office established by a government, international organization, company or a legal entity to represent its interests and conduct political, diplomatic, economic, commercial, cultural, marketing, and other activities, generally in a foreign country or jurisdiction where a formal diplomatic mission, branch office, or subsidiary is not warranted. Representative offices are generally easier to establish than branches, subsidiaries, or formal diplomatic missions, as they typically do not engage in direct commercial transactions or enjoy the full privileges accorded to diplomatic missions, and therefore may be subject to less extensive regulation.

Representative offices are widely used by governments, international organizations, and companies for liaison, diplomatic, commercial, and other activities. Consequently, representative offices tend to be utilized for activities such as diplomatic and political liaison, sourcing of products, quality control, and general liaison activities between the headquarters and the representative office overseas. A representative office is known in France as a bureau de liaison.

== Applications ==
=== Diplomacy ===
Representative offices are also used in international relations as alternatives to formal diplomatic missions, particularly by governments that do not maintain formal diplomatic relations with the host country. Examples include the representative offices maintained by various countries in Taiwan and Palestine.

=== Ukraine ===
Foreign companies on purpose to promote products or services in Ukraine, have the right to open a representative office. Offices are opened in order to promote (less for the purpose of direct and indirect sales) of goods and/or services of the company, through advertising campaigns, market research, distribution support, etc. Under Ukrainian law, Branches & Representative offices are established without constituting a separate legal entity. Ministry of Economy of Ukraine is the main authority to register representatives. Representatives may have a bank account (in local and foreign currency) and obtain a seal (emblem). Financing received from main office, is fully exempt from income tax if it was properly used by office (inc. salary, rent payment, advertising campaign, market research, etc).

Registration of representative offices and obtaining a certificate of registration is the basis to obtain a residence permit for foreign employees of representative office. Certificate of registration enables a temporary duty and value-added tax (VAT) free import in Ukraine of property and equipment required.

== See also ==
- diplomatic mission
- De facto embassy
