= Paul de Sorbait =

Austrian physician and sanitary engineer (1624–1691)

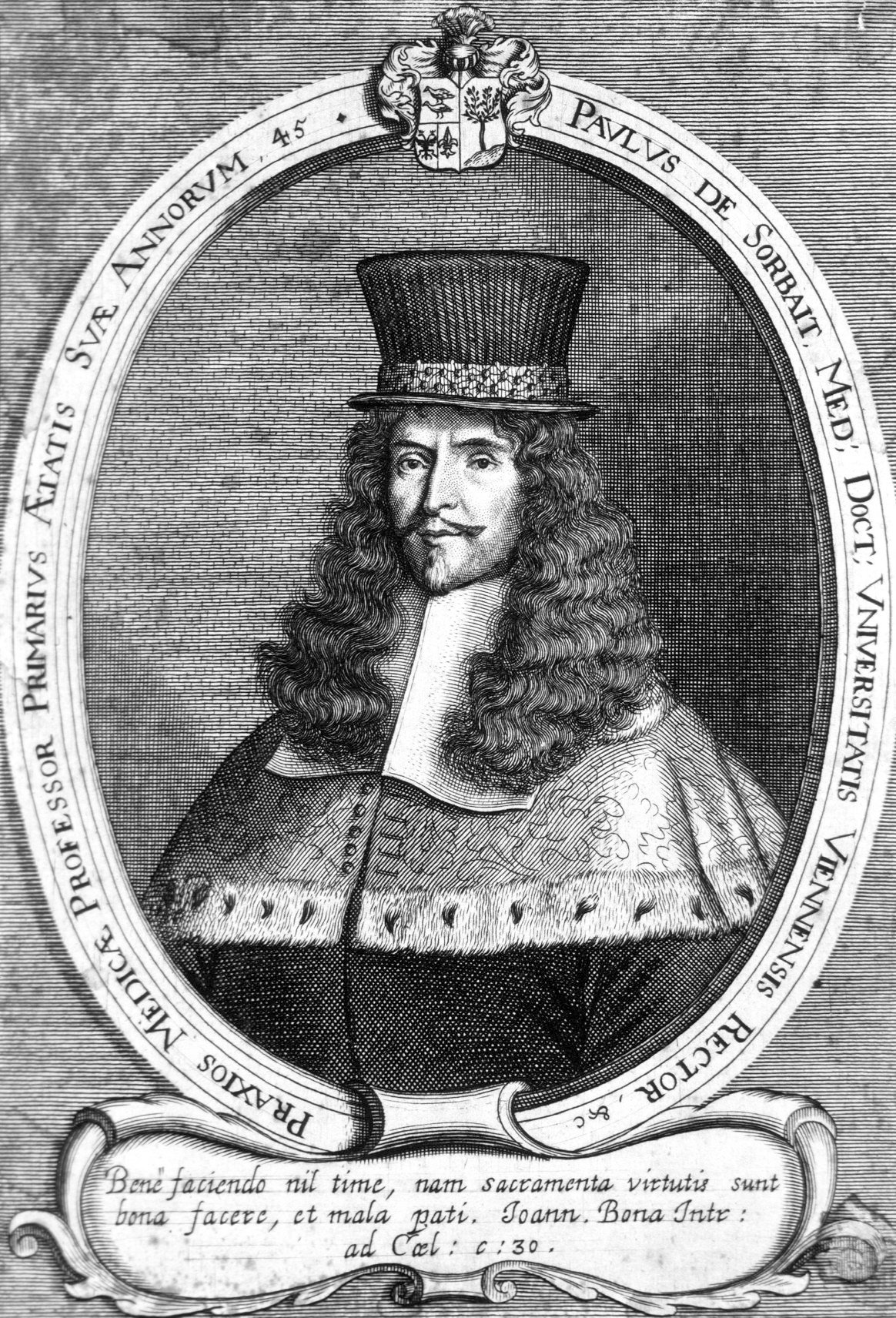

Paul de Sorbait (b. in Hainault, 25 January 1624; d. Vienna, 19 April 1691) was an Austrian physician and sanitary engineer.

He went to school in Paderborn, then attended the University of Padua, where apparently he obtained his degree of Doctor of Philosophy and Medicine. He practiced as a physician in Rome, Cologne, and Arnhem, and in August, 1652, was made a member of the medical faculty of the University of Vienna. In 1655 he became professor of theoretical medicine at the same university, and in 1666 professor of practical medicine. In 1658 he was appointed court-physician to the Empress-Dowager Eleonora. In 1676 he rebuilt at his own expense the students' hall "Goldberg" and added a chapel to it. During the Great Plague of Vienna (1679), the Emperor Leopold I appointed him official councillor and chief supervisor of sanitary conditions in Vienna. Soon after this he was ennobled.

In 1681 he resigned his professorship and founded a scholarship for medical students. During the siege of Vienna by the Turks in 1683 he commanded the company formed of students as chief sergeant-major. His tomb is in the Cathedral of St. Stephen in Vienna. In 1909 the national association of the official doctors of Austria selected Sorbait's portrait as the insignia of the association. He gained a reputation as a teacher in Vienna by encouragement of anatomy and botany, as well as by adherence to the Hippocratic school. His prominent position in the year 1679 gave him the opportunity to organize sanitary conditions in Vienna.

== Published works ==
- "Universa medicina tam theorica quam practica" etc. (Nuremberg, 1672, 1675); this is his chief work. It was issued in a revised and enlarged form under the title: "Praxios medicae tractatus VII" (Vienna, 1680 and 1701);
- "Discursus academicus in renovatione magistratus civici", 7 Jan., 1669, in German; "Resignatio rectoratus", 25 Nov., 1669;
- "Exhortatio in honorem St. Barbarae", 25 Jan., 1664; all these are to be found in the "Prax. med. tract.", 578–90;
- "Die Johann Wilhelm Mannagellasche Pestordnung im Auftrag der Regierung von P. Sorbait herausgegeben und vermehrt" (1679);
- "Consilium medicum seu dialogus loimicus de peste Viennensi" (Vienna, 1679; also in German, 1679; 1713; Berlin, 1681), Sorbait's most popular book.

== Sources ==
Attribution

- Cites:
  - Oesterreichischer Galenus, dass ist Lob- Leich- und Ehrenpredig Thro Magnificenz dess Wohl-Edel Gebohrnen und hochgelehrten Pauli de Sorbait von P. Emericus Pfendtner O.F.M., 10 Mai, 1691 (Vienna);
  - Leopold Senfelder, Paul de Sorbait in Wiener klinische Rundschau (1906), nos. 21–27, 29–30.
