= Droga Kolinska =

Slovenian food processing company

- Industry: Branded food
- Founded: 1996; 30 years ago
- Owner: Atlantic Grupa (100%)
- Website: drogakolinska.si

Droga Kolinska is a Slovenian food processing company from Slovenia, majority owned by Croatian Atlantic Grupa.

== History ==
Droga Kolinska came into existence with the merger of the companies Droga d.d. from Portorož and Kolinska d.d. from Ljubljana.

In November 2010, Istrabenz sold its majority share in Droga Kolinska to Croatian Atlantic Grupa for a total of 382 million euros (243.11 million euros and debts).
