= 2020–21 Hrvatski telekom Premijer liga =

Hrvatski telekom Premijer liga
- Season: 2020–21
- Duration: 18 September 2020 – March 2021 (Regular season)
- Teams: 12
- TV partners: HRT; Arena Sport

Regular season
- Top seed: Zadar
- Season MVP: (Croatia) Henrik Širko (Šibenka)
- Promoted: Cedevita Junior
- Relegated: Hermes Analitica

Finals
- Champions: Zadar
- Runners-up: Split
- Semifinalists: Cibona; Gorica
- Finals MVP: (Croatia) Dominik Mavra (Zadar)

Statistical leaders
Points	(Montenegro) Milija Miković (Šibenka)	19.4
Rebounds	(United States) Hasan Varence (Alkar)	8.5
Assists	(Croatia) Borna Kapusta (Gorica)	6.1

Records
- Biggest home win: Split 125–59 Hermes (10 January 2021)
- Biggest away win: Hermes 76–116 Cibona (10 November 2020)
- Highest scoring: Hermes 115–111 Furnir (14 October 2020)
- Winning streak: Gorica; 3 games
- Losing streak: Hermes; 4 games
- All statistics correct as of February 14, 2021.

The 2020–21 Hrvatski telekom Premijer liga (Croatian: Hrvatski telekom Premijer liga 2020./21.) was the 30th season of the HT Premijer liga, the top-tier professional basketball league in Croatia. The season started on 18 September 2020.

== Format ==
All participants in Premijer liga including teams that play ABA League joined the regular season. It will play with a triple round-robin format where the eight first qualified teams joined the playoffs, while the penultimate will be play relegation playoffs and last qualified one was relegated.

== Current teams ==
=== Promotion and relegation ===
Since the previous season was cancelled, there was no promotion and relegation.

=== Venues and locations ===
Location of teams in the 2020–21 HT Premijer liga

Team	Home city	Arena	Capacity
Adria Oil Škrljevo	Čavle	Mavrinci Hall	720
Alkar	Sinj	Ivica Glavan Ićo Sports Hall	600
Cibona	Zagreb	Dražen Petrović Basketball Hall	5,400
Furnir	Zagreb	Dubrava Sports Hall	2,000
Gorica	Velika Gorica	Velika Gorica City Sports Hall	620
Hermes Analitica	Zagreb	Dražen Petrović Basketball Hall	5,400
Sonik Puntamika	Zadar	Jazine Basketball Hall	3,000
Split	Split	Arena Gripe	3,500
Šibenka	Šibenik	Baldekin Sports Hall	900
Vrijednosnice	Osijek	Gradski vrt Hall	3,538
Zabok	Zabok	Zabok Sports Hall	3,000
Zadar	Zadar	Krešimir Ćosić Hall	8,500

Teams that play in the 2020–21 First Adriatic League
Teams that play in the 2020–21 Second Adriatic League
Teams that play in the 2020–21 Alpe Adria Cup

=== Personnel and sponsorships ===
Team	Head coach	Captain	Kit manufacturer	Shirt sponsor
Adria Oil Škrljevo	(Croatia) Damir Rajković	(Croatia) Josip Barnjak	GBT	Renault RB Auto / Metis d.o.o.
Alkar	(Croatia) Denis Bobeta	(Croatia) Hrvoje Vučić	Jako	IDS Šibenik
Cibona	(Serbia) Vladimir Jovanović	(Croatia) Roko Prkačin	Visual	Erste Bank
Furnir	(Croatia) Jeronimo Šarin	(Croatia) Petar Perić	No1	Furnir
Gorica	(Croatia) Josip Sesar	(Croatia) Ivan Majcunić	Sportika	Matić Tech Cut
Hermes Analitica	(Croatia) Božidar Bilafer	(Croatia) Filip Kordić	Adidas	Orlando
Sonik Puntamika	(Croatia) Stipe Kuliš	(Croatia) Dino Palčić	Adidas	Sonik
Split	(Croatia) Mile Karakaš	(Croatia) Mateo Kedžo	Macron	Jugoplastika
Šibenka	(Croatia) Dženan Rahimić	(Croatia) Domagoj Bašić	Errea	NP Krka
Vrijednosnice	(Croatia) Stipe Šarlija	(Croatia) Robert Kujundžić	Nike	Vrijednosnice Osijek
Zabok	(Croatia) Ivan Tomas	(Croatia) Antonio Črnjević	Luanvi	Terme Tuhelj
Zadar	(Croatia) Veljko Mršić	(Croatia) Dominik Mavra	Macron	OTP Bank

== Regular season ==
=== Standings ===
Pos	Team	Pld	W	L	PF	PA	PD	Pts	Qualification or relegation
1	Zadar	33	29	4	2840	2313	+527	62	Advance to the playoffs
2	Split	33	26	7	2951	2554	+397	59	Advance to the playoffs
3	Cibona	33	26	7	2975	2424	+551	59	Advance to the playoffs
4	Gorica	33	24	9	2894	2522	+372	57	Advance to the playoffs
5	Sonik Puntamika	33	18	15	2635	2774	−139	51	Advance to the playoffs
6	Adria Oil Škrljevo	33	18	15	2653	2712	−59	51	Advance to the playoffs
7	Zabok	33	15	18	2562	2663	−101	48	Advance to the playoffs
8	Šibenka	33	13	20	2795	2949	−154	46	Advance to the playoffs
9	Vrijednosnice	33	10	23	2708	2899	−191	43	
10	Alkar	33	9	24	2602	2794	−192	42	
11	Furnir	33	7	26	2658	3004	−346	40	Qualification to the relegation playoffs
12	Hermes Analitica (R)	33	3	30	2561	3226	−665	36	Relegation to the First League

Updated to match(es) played on 18 April 2021. Source: HKS
(R) Relegated

=== Results ===
Home \ Away	ADR	ALK	CIB	FUR	GOR	HER	SON	SPL	ŠIB	VRI	ZAB	ZAD
Adria Oil Škrljevo	—	95–74	65–93	97–78		89–72	62–93	66–76	88–77		77–75	
Alkar		—	66–99	94–89			85–94	69–92	112–102	86–99	73–84	
Cibona			—	85–67	79–69		108–77		96–67	102–70	85–69	62–81
Furnir		83–98		—	84–78	87–103	77–80	88–95		90–64		67–82
Gorica	111–73	98–75			—	113–67		79–73	86–82		90–68	72–70
Hermes Analitica	70–95	75–88		115–111	76–116	—	76–98	69–84	64–84		64–70	
Sonik Puntamika	81–69			80–70	69–90	89–80	—	80–77		97–92		78–73
Split	89–77	84–71	96–85				92–70	—			102–69	
Šibenka				74–90	67–79	90–64	98–84	111–96	—		87–81	
Vrijednosnice	83–69				86–106	101–85		82–86	93–91	—	79–76	69–78
Zabok	66–75	83–82	53–82	92–82	68–79		88–76			98–81	—	66–80
Zadar	99–68	91–63	73–70		74–55	94–73		88–61	92–52	73–70		—

Updated to match(es) played on 6 January 2021. Source: HKS
Legend: Blue = home team win; Red = away team win.

== Playoffs ==
Quarterfinals
1	Zadar	2
8	Šibenka	0
4	Gorica	2
5	Sonik Puntamika	0
2	Split	2
7	Zabok	0
3	Cibona	2
6	Adria Oil Škrljevo	0

Semifinals
1	Zadar	2
4	Gorica	1
2	Split	2
3	Cibona	0

Final
1	Zadar	3
2	Split	2

== Relegation playoffs ==
As of the 2020–21 season, team who lost the 2020–21 First League final and the 11th placed team of the 2020–21 Premijer liga season will play in the Qualifiers for a spot in the 2021–22 Premijer liga season.

=== Teams ===
- 11th Premijer liga team: Furnir
- 2nd First League team: Dinamo Zagreb

=== Results ===
Team 1	Series	Team 2	Game 1	Game 2	Game 3
Dinamo Zagreb	156-163	Furnir	84-87	72-76	–
