= 2022–23 Hrvatski telekom Premijer liga =

32nd season of the Premijer liga

HT Premijer Liga
- Season: 2022–23
- Dates: 30 September 2022 – 4 June 2023
- Teams: 12

Regular season
- Top seed: Zadar
- Relegated: Gorica

Finals
- Champions: Zadar
- Runners-up: Split
- Semifinalists: Cibona; Cedevita Junior

Seasons
- ← 2021–22 2023–24 →

The 2022–23 Hrvatski telekom Premijer liga (Croatian: Hrvatski telekom Premijer liga 2022./23) was the 32nd season of the HT Premijer liga, the top-tier professional basketball league in Croatia.

== Format ==
The league consisted of 12 teams. The first half of the season was played by a two-round system, while the teams in the second half of the season were divided into two groups; Championship Round (Croatian: Liga za prvaka) consisted of the top six teams from the first half of the season, while Relegation and Promotion Round (Croatian: Liga za ostanak) consisted of the remaining six teams from the first half of the season.

The top four teams of Championship Round will secure a spot in the playoffs semifinals.

== Current teams ==
=== Promotion and relegation ===
Team promoted from the First League

- Dinamo Zagreb (First League champion)
- Bosco

Team relegated to the First League

- Vrijednosnice Osijek
- Sonik Puntamika

=== Venues and locations ===
Location of teams in the 2022–23 HT Premijer liga

Team	Home city	Arena	Capacity
Alkar	Sinj	Ivica Glavan Ićo Sports Hall	600
Bosco	Zagreb	Boško Božić-Pepsi Sports Hall	2,500
Cibona	Zagreb	Dražen Petrović Basketball Hall	5,400
Cedevita Junior	Zagreb	Dom Sportova	3,100
DepoLink Škrljevo	Čavle	Mavrinci Hall	720
Dinamo Zagreb	Zagreb		
Furnir	Zagreb	Dubrava Sports Hall	2,000
Gorica	Velika Gorica	Velika Gorica City Sports Hall	620
Split	Split	Arena Gripe	3,500
Šibenka	Šibenik	Baldekin Sports Hall	900
Zabok	Zabok	Zabok Sports Hall	3,000
Zadar	Zadar	Krešimir Ćosić Hall	8,500

Teams that play in the 2022–23 First Adriatic League
Teams that play in the 2022–23 Second Adriatic League
Teams that play in the 2022–23 Alpe Adria Cup

NOTE: Vrijednosnice Osijek although relegated to the First League also plays in the 2022–23 Second Adriatic League.

== Croatian clubs in European competitions ==
Team	Competition	Progress
Cedevita	FIBA Europe Cup	Qualifying Round
