= 2023–24 Favbet Premijer liga =

33rd season of the Favbet Premijer liga

Favber Premijer Liga
- Season: 2023–24
- Dates: 28 September 2023 – 2 June 2024
- Teams: 12

Regular season
- Top seed: Zadar
- Relegated: Bosco; DepoLink Škrljevo

Finals
- Champions: Zadar
- Runners-up: Split
- Semifinalists: Cibona; Dinamo Zagreb

Seasons
- ← 2022–23 2024–25 →

The 2023–24 Favbet Premijer liga is the 33rd season of the HT Premijer liga, the top-tier professional basketball league in Croatia.

== Format ==
The league consisted of 12 teams. The first half of the season was played by a two-round system, while the teams in the second half of the season were divided into two groups; Championship Round (Croatian: Liga za prvaka) consisted of the top six teams from the first half of the season, while Relegation and Promotion Round (Croatian: Liga za ostanak) consisted of the remaining six teams from the first half of the season.

The top four teams of Championship Round secured a spot in the playoffs semifinals.

== Current teams ==
=== Promotion and relegation ===
Team promoted from the First League

- Dubrovnik (First League champion)

Team relegated to the First League

- Gorica

=== Venues and locations ===
Location of teams in the 2023–24 Favbet Premijer liga

Team	Home city	Arena	Capacity
Alkar	Sinj	Ivica Glavan Ićo Sports Hall	600
Bosco	Zagreb	Boško Božić-Pepsi Sports Hall	2,500
Cibona	Zagreb	Dražen Petrović Basketball Hall	5,400
Cedevita Junior	Zagreb	Dom Sportova	3,100
DepoLink Škrljevo	Čavle	Mavrinci Hall	720
Dinamo Zagreb	Zagreb	Dražen Petrović Basketball Hall	5,400
Dubrovnik	Dubrovnik	Športska dvorana Gospino polje	2,500
Dubrava	Zagreb	Dubrava Sports Hall	2,000
Split	Split	Arena Gripe	3,500
Šibenka	Šibenik	Baldekin Sports Hall	900
Zabok	Zabok	Zabok Sports Hall	3,000
Zadar	Zadar	Krešimir Ćosić Hall	8,500

Teams that play in the 2023–24 First Adriatic League
Teams that play in the 2023–24 Second Adriatic League
Teams that play in the 2023–24 Alpe Adria Cup

== Standings ==
Pos	Team	Pld	W	L	GF	GA	GD	Pts	Qualification or relegation
1	Zadar	33	31	2	2927	2351	+576	64	Advance to the Playoffs
2	Split	33	28	5	2857	2400	+457	61	Advance to the Playoffs
3	Cibona	33	22	11	2639	2514	+125	55	Advance to the Playoffs
4	Cedevita Junior	33	21	12	2870	2660	+210	54	Advance to the Playoffs
5	Dinamo Zagreb	33	20	13	2805	2575	+230	53	Advance to the Playoffs
6	Zabok	33	17	16	2724	2711	+13	50	Advance to the Playoffs
7	Dubrovnik	33	15	18	2485	2530	−45	48	Advance to the Playoffs
8	Dubrava	33	14	19	2649	2742	−93	47	Advance to the Playoffs
9	Šibenka	33	13	20	2649	2706	−57	46	
10	Alkar	33	9	24	2567	2739	−172	42	
11	DepoLink Škrljevo	33	7	26	2716	3066	−350	40	Play-Out Round
12	Bosco	33	1	32	2349	3243	−894	34	Relegation to the Prva muška liga

Source: HKS

== Play-Out Round ==
Team 1	Agg.	Team 2	1st leg	2nd leg
DepoLink Škrljevo	166–189	Vrijednosnice Osijek	81–80	85–109

== Playoffs ==
Teams in bold advanced to the next round. The numbers to the left of each team indicate the team's seeding, the numbers to the right indicate the result of games including result in bold of the team that won in that game, and the numbers furthest to the right indicate the number of games the team won in that round.

Quarterfinals
**1**	**Zadar**	**78**	**90**	**2**
8	Dubrava	61	78	0
4	Cedevita Junior	**95**	71	89	1
**5**	**Dinamo Zagreb**	82	**102**	**100**	**2**
**2**	**Split**	**100**	**82**	**2**
7	Dubrovnik	78	74	0
**3**	**Cibona**	**92**	70	**97**	**2**
6	Zabok	75	**73**	67	1

Semifinals
**1**	**Zadar**	**83**	**78**	**2**
5	Dinamo Zagreb	68	67	0
**2**	**Split**	**89**	**96**	**2**
3	Cibona	74	67	0

Finals
**1**	**Zadar**	78	**92**	77	**84**	**93**	**3**
2	Split	**85**	71	**87**	55	66	2

Source: HKS
