= 2018–19 Premijer liga =

28th season of the HT Premijer liga

Hrvatski telekom Premijer liga
- Season: 2018–19
- Duration: October 6, 2018 – April 20, 2019 (Regular season); April 23, 2019 – May 30, 2019 (Playoffs)
- Teams: 12
- TV partner(s): HRT; Arena Sport

Regular season
- Top seed: Zadar
- Promoted: Dubrava; Sonik-Puntamika
- Relegated: Bosco

Finals
- Champions: Cibona (19th title)
- Runners-up: Cedevita
- Semifinalists: Split; Zadar
- Finals MVP: (Croatia) Damir Markota

Statistical leaders
Points	(Croatia) Hrvoje Vučić (Alkar)	17.6
Rebounds	(Nigeria) Abdul-Malik Abu (Vrijednosnice Osijek)	9.1
Assists	(Slovakia) Mario Ihring (Vrijednosnice Osijek)	6.7

Records
- Biggest home win: Šibenik 115–62 Hermes Analitica (March 16, 2019)
- Biggest away win: Bosco 67–107 Cibona (October 23, 2018)
- Highest attendance: 4,000; Zadar 94–72 Šibenik (December 18, 2018)
- All statistics correct as of May 30, 2019.

The 2018–19 HT Premijer liga was the 28th season of the HT Premijer liga, the highest professional basketball league in Croatia. It started on October 6, 2018 and finished on May 30, 2019.

== Format ==
As in the previous season, all participants in Premijer liga including teams that play ABA League joined the regular season. It was played with a double round-robin format where the eight first qualified teams joined the playoffs, while the penultimate will be play relegation playoffs and last qualified one was relegated.

== Current teams ==
=== Promotion and relegation ===
Teams promoted from the First League

- Bosco
- Gorica

Teams relegated to the First League

- Jazine Arbanasi
- Kaštela
- Zagreb

=== Locations and team informations ===
Location of teams in the 2018–19 HT Premijer liga

Team	Coach	City	Venue	Capacity
Adria Oil Škrljevo	(Croatia) Damir Rajković	Škrljevo	Dvorana Mavrinci	720
Alkar	(Croatia) Srđan Helbich	Sinj	Sportska dvorana Ivica Glavan Ićo	600
Bosco	(Croatia) Matija Brkljačić	Zagreb	Sportska dvorana Trnsko	2,500
Cedevita	(Croatia) Dražen Orešković	Zagreb	Dom sportova	3,100
Cibona	(Bosnia and Herzegovina) Ivan Velić	Zagreb	Dražen Petrović Hall	5,400
Gorica	(Croatia) Josip Sesar	Velika Gorica	Dvorana srednjih škola Velika Gorica	1,000
Hermes Analitica	(Croatia) Zvonimir Mravak	Zagreb	Dražen Petrović Hall	5,400
Split	(Croatia) Ante Grgurević	Split	Arena Gripe	3,500
Šibenik	(Croatia) Miro Jurić	Šibenik	Sportska dvorana Baldekin	900
Vrijednosnice	(Croatia) Domagoj Kujundžić	Osijek	Gradski vrt Hall	3,538
Zabok	(Croatia) Ivan Tomas	Zabok	Zabok Sports Hall	3,000
Zadar	(Croatia) Ante Nazor	Zadar	Krešimir Ćosić Hall	7,997

Teams that play in the 2018–19 First Adriatic League
Teams that play in the 2018–19 Second Adriatic League
Teams that play in the 2018-19 Alpe Adria Cup

=== Coaching changes ===
Team	Outgoing manager	Date of vacancy	Position in table	Replaced with	Date of appointment	Ref.
Šibenik	(Croatia) Vladimir Anzulović	10 May 2018	Pre-season	(Croatia) Miro Jurić	11 May 2018	
Split	(Croatia) Ivica Skelin	28 May 2018	Pre-season	(Croatia) Vladimir Anzulović	28 May 2018	
Cedevita	(Slovenia) Jure Zdovc	6 June 2018	Pre-season	(Croatia) Slaven Rimac	8 August 2018	
Cibona	(Croatia) Ante Nazor	6 June 2018	Pre-season	(Bosnia and Herzegovina) Ivan Velić	8 June 2018	
Zadar	(Croatia) Aramis Naglić	21 June 2018	Pre-season	(Slovenia) Aleš Pipan	28 June 2018	
Zabok	(Croatia) Ivan Perinčić	25 July 2018	Pre-season	(Croatia) Ivan Tomas	9 August 2018	
Zadar	(Slovenia) Aleš Pipan	23 October 2018	3rd (2–1)	(Croatia) Ante Nazor	24 October 2018	
Cedevita	(Croatia) Slaven Rimac	25 October 2018	1st (3–0)	(Croatia) Ivan Kapov	26 October 2018	
Cedevita	(Croatia) Ivan Kapov	21 December 2018	4th (7–4)	(Croatia) Dražen Orešković	21 December 2018	
Bosco	(Croatia) Matija Brkljačić	6 January 2019	12th (1–10)	(Croatia) Ivica Burić	6 January 2019	
Vrijednosnice	(Croatia) Vladimir Krstić	9 January 2019	8th (5–6)	(Croatia) Domagoj Kujundžić	11 January 2019	
Split	(Croatia) Vladimir Anzulović	5 March 2019	4th (10–5)	(Croatia) Ante Grgurević	5 March 2019	
Bosco	(Croatia) Ivica Burić	8 March 2019	12th (1–14)	(Croatia) Matija Brkljačić	8 March 2019	

== Regular season ==
=== League table ===
Pos	Team	Pld	W	L	PF	PA	PD	Pts	Qualification or relegation
1	Zadar	22	18	4	1895	1704	+191	40	Advance to the playoffs
2	Cibona	22	17	5	2009	1675	+334	39	Advance to the playoffs
3	Split	22	14	8	1840	1702	+138	36	Advance to the playoffs
4	Cedevita	22	13	9	1805	1729	+76	35	Advance to the playoffs
5	Vrijednosnice	22	12	10	1805	1858	−53	34	Advance to the playoffs
6	Gorica	22	11	11	1891	1795	+96	33	Advance to the playoffs
7	Zabok	22	11	11	1740	1749	−9	33	Advance to the playoffs
8	Šibenik	22	10	12	1839	1812	+27	32	Advance to the playoffs
9	Adria Oil Škrljevo	22	10	12	1801	1824	−23	32	
10	Alkar	22	7	15	1717	2018	−301	29	
11	Hermes Analitica (O)	22	7	15	1893	2091	−198	29	Qualification to the relegation playoffs
12	Bosco (R)	22	2	20	1689	1967	−278	24	Relegation to First League

(O) Play-off winners; (R) Relegated

=== Results ===
Home \ Away	ADR	ALK	BOS	CED	CIB	GOR	HER	SPL	SIB	VRI	ZAB	ZAD
Adria Oil Škrljevo	—	93–62	96–82	79–61	66–86	82–79	79–84	74–89	83–78	79–66	63–66	87–88
Alkar	73–79	—	86–80	79–96	89–101	85–64	96–82	79–95	91–86	82–78	84–82	62–103
Bosco	88–93	78–87	—	73–53	67–107	73–96	92–103	77–79	74–87	66–71	81–94	88–101
Cedevita	86–79	103–75	93–76	—	99–84	71–66	83–79	79–78	100–103	82–59	80–77	73–77
Cibona	101–92	100–55	94–64	94–73	—	77–83	132–77	99–84	92–87	89–71	88–68	76–55
Gorica	91–82	104–79	98–68	75–92	83–76	—	98–99	97–87	86–87	117–76	82–69	77–85
Hermes Analitica	96–99	92–86	76–82	93–103	90–102	90–109	—	71–90	88–86	97–103	99–78	95–79
Split	87–77	97–49	94–70	61–77	70–67	79–86	86–76	—	81–65	93–84	82–64	75–76
Šibenik	100–84	88–79	81–68	96–88	72–86	86–79	115–62	83–76	—	65–72	72–73	70–73
Vrijednosnice	97–79	121–91	93–84	83–78	78–108	82–80	79–77	75–78	104–95	—	87–75	88–69
Zabok	78–81	97–77	97–79	74–72	73–74	73–61	96–84	86–91	79–65	84–69	—	91–88
Zadar	86–75	99–71	88–79	69–63	79–76	97–80	118–83	91–88	94–72	90–69	90–66	—

Source: Eurobasket.com
Legend: Blue = home team win; Red = away team win.

== Playoffs ==
Quarterfinals and semifinals will be played in a best-of-three-games format, while the finals in a best-of-five one.

Quarterfinals
1	Zadar	2
8	Šibenik	0
4	Cedevita	2
5	Vrijednosnice	0
2	Cibona	2
7	Zabok	0
3	Split	2
6	Gorica	1

Semifinals
1	Zadar	2
4	Cedevita	3
2	Cibona	3
3	Split	0

Final
4	Cedevita	0
2	Cibona	4

=== Quarterfinals ===
Team 1	Series	Team 2	Game 1	Game 2	Game 3
Zadar	2–0	Šibenik	82–73	86–66	–
Cibona	2–0	Zabok	76–66	85–79	–
Split	2–1	Gorica	102–71	80–89	73–65
Cedevita	2–0	Vrijednosnice	104–86	102–80	–

=== Semifinals ===
Team 1	Series	Team 2	Game 1	Game 2	Game 3	Game 4	Game 5
Zadar	2–3	Cedevita	67–75 (OT)	57–96	85–83	84–78	71–72
Cibona	3–0	Split	89–82	88–66	83–78	–	–

=== Finals ===
Team 1	Series	Team 2	Game 1	Game 2	Game 3	Game 4	Game 5	Game 6	Game 7
Cedevita	0–4	Cibona	84–88	82–90	65–76	98–100	–	–	–

== Relegation playoffs ==
As of the 2018–19 season, team who lost the 2018–19 First League final and the 11th placed team of the 2018–19 Premijer liga season will play in the Qualifiers for a spot in the 2019–20 Premijer liga season.

=== Teams ===
- 11th Premijer liga team: Hermes Analitica
- 2nd First League team: Dubrava

=== Results ===
Team 1	Series	Team 2	Game 1	Game 2	Game 3
Hermes Analitica	2–0	Dubrava	85–82	83–72	–

== Croatian clubs in European competitions ==
Team	Competition	Progress
Cedevita	EuroCup	Top 16

== See also ==
- 2018–19 ABA League First Division
- 2018–19 ABA League Second Division
- 2018–19 First League
- 2018–19 Croatian First Women's Basketball League
