= 2017–18 A-1 League =

HT Premijer liga
- Season: 2017–18
- Duration: October 6, 2017–April 26, 2018 (Regular season); May 2, 2018–June 3, 2018 (Playoffs)
- Teams: 13
- TV partners: HRT; Arena Sport

Regular season
- Top seed: Cedevita
- Promoted: Bosco; Gorica
- Relegated: Zagreb; Ribola Kaštela; Jazine Arbanasi

Finals
- Champions: Cedevita (5th title)
- Runners-up: Cibona
- Semi-finalists: Split; Zadar

Statistical leaders
Points	(United States) Steven Gray (Zadar)	19.8
Rebounds	(Croatia) Luka Žorić (Cibona)	8.1
Assists	(Slovenia) Mirza Sarajlija (Jazine Arbanasi)	6.0

The 2017–18 HT Premijer liga was the 27th season of the HT Premijer liga, the highest professional basketball league in Croatia. It started on 6 October 2017 and finished on 3 June 2018.

Cedevita retained the title and achieved their fifth league overall.

== Format ==
As in the previous season, all participants in A-1 League including teams that play ABA League joined the regular season. It was played with a double round-robin format where the eight first qualified teams joined the playoffs while the last qualified one was relegated.

== Current teams ==
Location of teams in the A-1 League 2017–18

After the resign of Jolly Šibenik to its berth, the league was reduced to 13 teams. Jazine and Ribola Kaštela were promoted from the previous season. They would replace Gorica and Kvarner 2010.

Team	Coach	City	Venue	Capacity
Alkar	(Croatia) Srđan Helbich	Sinj	ŠD Sinj	1,500
Cedevita	(Slovenia) Jure Zdovc	Zagreb	Dom Sportova	3,100
Cibona	(Croatia) Ante Nazor	Zagreb	Dražen Petrović Basketball Hall	5,400
Hermes Analitica	(Croatia) Zvonimir Mravak	Zagreb	ŠD Prirodoslovne škole Vladimir Prelog	600
Jazine Arbanasi	(Croatia) Luka Bujas	Zadar	Jazine Basketball Hall	3,000
Ribola Kaštela	(Croatia) Ivica Ćelan	Kaštel Sućurac	Sportska dvorana Sokolana	1,500
Split	(Croatia) Ivica Skelin	Split	Arena Gripe	3,500
Šibenik	(Croatia) Vladimir Anzulović	Šibenik	Sportska dvorana Baldekin	1,726
Škrljevo	(Croatia) Damir Rajković	Škrljevo	Dvorana Mavrinci	1,000
Vrijednosnice	(Croatia) Vladimir Krstić	Osijek	Gradski Vrt	3,538
Zabok	(Croatia) Ivan Perinčić	Zabok	Zabok Sports Hall	3,000
Zadar	(Croatia) Aramis Naglić	Zadar	Dvorana Krešimir Ćosić	10,000
Zagreb	(Croatia) Nikola Garma	Zagreb	ŠD Trnsko	2,500

Teams that play in the 2017–18 First Adriatic League
Teams that play in the 2017–18 Second Adriatic League
Teams that play in the 2017-18 Alpe Adria Cup

== Regular season ==
=== League table ===
Pos	Team	Pld	W	L	PF	PA	PD	Pts	Qualification or relegation
1	Cedevita	24	23	1	2153	1584	+569	47	Qualification to playoffs
2	Zadar	24	23	1	2266	1789	+477	47	Qualification to playoffs
3	Cibona	24	18	6	2145	1810	+335	42	Qualification to playoffs
4	Split	24	16	8	2102	1924	+178	40	Qualification to playoffs
5	Šibenik	24	16	8	1875	1771	+104	40	Qualification to playoffs
6	Škrljevo	24	13	11	2003	1993	+10	37	Qualification to playoffs
7	Zabok	24	12	12	1876	1821	+55	36	Qualification to playoffs
8	Vrijednosnice Osijek	24	8	16	1796	1923	−127	32	Qualification to playoffs
9	Alkar	24	7	17	1733	1994	−261	31	
10	Hermes Analitica	24	7	17	1759	1974	−215	31	
11	Jazine Arbanasi (R)	24	5	19	1819	2147	−328	29	Relegation
12	Ribola Kaštela (R)	24	4	20	1696	2100	−404	28	Relegation
13	Zagreb (R)	24	4	20	1929	2322	−393	28	Relegation

(R) Relegated

== Playoffs ==
Quarterfinals and semifinals were played in a best-of-three-games format, while the finals in a best-of-five one (1-3-5).

Quarterfinals
1	Cedevita	2
8	Vrijednosnice	0
4	Split	2
5	Šibenik	0
2	Zadar	2
7	Zabok	0
3	Cibona	2
6	Škrljevo	1

Semifinals
1	Cedevita	2
4	Split	1
2	Zadar	1
3	Cibona	2

Final
1	Cedevita	3
3	Cibona	1

=== Quarterfinals ===
Team 1	Series	Team 2	Game 1	Game 2	Game 3
Cedevita	2–0	Vrijednosnice	101–67	89–62	—
Zadar	2–0	Zabok	98–76	87–69	—
Cibona	2–1	Škrljevo	88–65	61–62	116–77
Split	2–0	Šibenik	94–76	84–82	—

=== Semifinals ===
Team 1	Series	Team 2	Game 1	Game 2	Game 3
Cedevita	2−1	Split	84−80	66–75	95–64
Zadar	1−2	Cibona	89−78	86–96	88–96

=== Finals ===
Team 1	Series	Team 2	Game 1	Game 2	Game 3	Game 4
Cedevita	3–1	Cibona	87–96	82–73	81–54	77–68
