= 2021–22 Hrvatski telekom Premijer liga =

Hrvatski telekom Premijer liga
- Season: 2021–22
- Duration: 18 September 2021 – March 2022 (Regular season); March – April 2022 (Championship Round and Relegation and Promotion Round); May – June 2022 (Playoffs)
- Teams: 12
- TV partner(s): HRT; Arena Sport

Regular season
- Top seed: Cibona
- Season MVP: (Croatia) Toni Jelenković (Adria Oil Škrljevo)
- Promoted: Dinamo
- Relegated: Vrijednosnice Osijek

Finals
- Champions: Cibona
- Runners-up: Zadar
- Semifinalists: Gorica; Split
- Finals MVP: (Croatia) Toni Nakić (Cibona)

Statistical leaders
- Points: (Croatia) Josip Barnjak (Adria Oil Škrljevo)
- Rebounds: (Croatia) Patrik Jambrović (Šibenka)
- Assists: (Croatia) Borna Kapusta (Gorica)

The 2021–22 Hrvatski telekom Premijer liga (Croatian: Hrvatski telekom Premijer liga 2021./22.) was the 31st season of the HT Premijer liga, the top-tier professional basketball league in Croatia.

== Format ==
The league will consist of 12 teams. The first half of the season will be played by a two-round system, while the teams in the second half of the season will be divided into two groups; Championship Round (Croatian: Liga za prvaka) will consist of the top six teams from the first half of the season, while Relegation and Promotion Round (Croatian: Liga za ostanak) will consist of the remaining six teams from the first half of the season.

The top four teams of Championship Round will secure a spot in the playoffs semifinals.

== Current teams ==
=== Promotion and relegation ===
Team promoted from the First League

- Cedevita Junior

Team relegated to the First League

- Hermes Analitica

=== Venues and locations ===
Location of teams in the 2021–22 HT Premijer liga

Team	Home city	Arena	Capacity
Adria Oil Škrljevo	Čavle	Mavrinci Hall	720
Alkar	Sinj	Ivica Glavan Ićo Sports Hall	600
Cibona	Zagreb	Dražen Petrović Basketball Hall	5,400
Cedevita Junior	Zagreb	Dom Sportova	3,100
Furnir	Zagreb	Dubrava Sports Hall	2,000
Gorica	Velika Gorica	Velika Gorica City Sports Hall	620
Sonik Puntamika	Zadar	Jazine Basketball Hall	3,000
Split	Split	Arena Gripe	3,500
Šibenka	Šibenik	Baldekin Sports Hall	900
Vrijednosnice	Osijek	Gradski vrt Hall	3,538
Zabok	Zabok	Zabok Sports Hall	3,000
Zadar	Zadar	Krešimir Ćosić Hall	8,500

Teams that play in the 2021–22 First Adriatic League
Teams that play in the 2021–22 Second Adriatic League
Teams that play in the 2021–22 Alpe Adria Cup

=== Personnel and sponsorships ===
Team	Head coach	Captain	Kit manufacturer	Shirt sponsor
Adria Oil Škrljevo	(Croatia) Damir Rajković	(Croatia) Josip Barnjak	GBT	Adria Oil / Erste Bank
Alkar	(Croatia) Marko Trninić	(Croatia) Hrvoje Vučić	No1	Hotel Alkar
Cibona	(Serbia) Vladimir Jovanović	(Croatia) Roko Prkačin	Visual	Erste Bank
Cedevita Junior	(Croatia) Damir Mulaomerović	(Croatia) Emir Šabić	Adidas	Cedevita / INA
Furnir	(Croatia) Jeronimo Šarin	(Croatia) Petar Perić	No1	Furnir
Gorica	(Croatia) Mladen Starčević	(Croatia) Ivan Majcunić	Sportika	Matić Tech Cut
Sonik Puntamika	(Croatia) Stipe Kuliš	(Croatia) Dino Palčić	No1	Sonik
Split	(Croatia) Srđan Subotić	(Croatia) Mateo Kedžo	Macron	Optika Anda
Šibenka	(Croatia) Damir Milačić	(Croatia) Domagoj Bašić	Errea	NP Krka
Vrijednosnice	(Croatia) Marko Mandić	(Croatia) Šime Lisica	STX	Vrijednosnice Osijek / Id Eko
Zabok	(Croatia) Ivan Tomas	(Croatia) Antonio Črnjević	Luanvi	Terme Tuhelj
Zadar	(Croatia) Vladimir Anzulović	(Croatia) Dominik Mavra	Macron	OTP Bank

== Regular season ==
=== Standings ===
Pos	Team	Pld	W	D	L	PF	PA	PD	Pts	Qualification
1	Zadar	22	17	0	5	1869	1595	+274	51	Qualification to Championship Round
2	Cibona	22	17	0	5	1884	1569	+315	51	Qualification to Championship Round
3	Split	22	17	0	5	1820	1563	+257	51	Qualification to Championship Round
4	Cedevita Junior	22	17	0	5	1862	1685	+177	51	Qualification to Championship Round
5	Gorica	22	13	0	9	1772	1710	+62	39	Qualification to Championship Round
6	Zabok	22	10	0	12	1684	1754	−70	30	Qualification to Championship Round
7	Adria Oil Škrljevo	22	10	0	12	1768	1797	−29	30	Qualification to Relegation and Promotion Round
8	Furnir	22	7	0	15	1592	1751	−159	21	Qualification to Relegation and Promotion Round
9	Alkar	22	7	0	15	1696	1861	−165	21	Qualification to Relegation and Promotion Round
10	Šibenka	22	6	0	16	1590	1789	−199	18	Qualification to Relegation and Promotion Round
11	Vrijednosnice	22	6	0	16	1690	1857	−167	18	Qualification to Relegation and Promotion Round
12	Sonik Puntamika	22	5	0	17	1563	1859	−296	15	Qualification to Relegation and Promotion Round

Updated to match(es) played on April 8, 2022. Source: HKS
