= Filip Bundović =

Croatian basketball player (born 1994)

No. 43 – KK Zagreb
- Position: Power forward
- League: First Men's Basketball League

Personal information
- Born: 16 February 1994 (age 32) Zagreb, Croatia
- Listed height: 6 ft 7.5 in (2.02 m)
- Listed weight: 205 lb (93 kg)

Career information
- NBA draft: 2016: undrafted
- Playing career: 2011–present

Career history
- 2011–2015: Cedevita
- 2011–2012: → Mladost
- 2012–2013: → Zabok
- 2013–2014: → Mladost
- 2014–2015: → Zabok
- 2015–2016: Mitteldeutscher
- 2016: Estudiantes B
- 2016–2017: Cedevita
- 2017: Zrinjski
- 2017–2018: Šibenik
- 2018: Z-Mobile Prishtina
- 2018: Bandirma Kirmizi
- 2018–2021: Cibona
- 2021: Rabotnički
- 2021–2022: Cedevita Junior
- 2022–2023: Cibona
- 2024–2025: Cibona
- 2026–present: KK Zagreb

Career highlights
- Croatian League champion (2019); Croatian Cup winner (2023)
Medals
Men's basketball
Representing Croatia
European U-16 Championship
Gold medal – first place	2010 Montenegro	U-16 Team

Filip Bundović (born February 16, 1994) is a Croatian professional basketball player currently playing for KK Zagreb in the Croatian second-tier First Men's Basketball League. Standing at 2.02 m, he plays at the power forward position.

== Youth career ==
Bundović played for the youth selections for his hometown club Cedevita. He first came to attention of the national sports media in 2012 after Cedevita defeated the much favourized Zagreb in the finals of the Croatian junior basketball league. Zagreb's team included Dominik Mavra and future NBA players Dario Šarić and Mario Hezonja, but the Finals MVP award went to Bundović.

== Professional career ==
He signed his first professional contract with Cedevita, but spent most of his four-year contract playing for the First division Zabok and Second division Mladost. In the fall of 2015, for the first time he went abroad by signing for the German League Mitteldeutscher for whom he played ten matches in which he scored 5.7 points with 2.2 rebounds on average. The second half of the season he spent playing for Estudiantes B. In the Liga EBA he played 13 games and averaged 14.1 points and 5.8 rebounds.

In 2017 he returned to his youth club Cedevita where he played for the B team in the Croatian League. In 14 played games he made 13.7 points and 4.7 rebounds in average. In March 2017 he signed for Zrinjski Mostar for the rest of the season. In the Bosnian League he averaged only 3.4 points.

Bundović started the 2017–18 season in Šibenik. Until his departure from Šibenik in the 15 games he played in the Croatian League he made 11.6 points and 4.5 rebounds in an average 16 minutes spent on court. In March 2018 he left Šibenik. The rest of the season he spent in Z-Mobile Prishtina of the Kosovo Basketball Superleague. In Prishtina he achieved his most impressive stats: 20.8 ppg and 8.3 rpg.

In September 2018 Bundović signed for Bandirma Kirmizi of the Turkish Basketball First League (second tier). After playing only one game for the Turkish side he moved back to home city, this time to Cibona. In July 2019, Bundović extended his contract with Cibona for another two years.

In February 2021, Bundović left Cibona and joined Rabotnički of the Macedonian First League and ABA League Second Division.

In September, 2021, Bundović returned to the Croatian League signing a two-month contract with Cedevita Junior.

After spending a season in Cedevita Junior, in September 2022, he returned to Cibona.

Bundović suffered a shoulder injury in March, 2023 and did not play for Cibona until the end of the 2023–24 season. After spending half of the 2023–24 season without a contract, in January 2024 Bundović signed with Cibona again.

== National team career ==
Bundović played for the Croatian national team youth selections. He played for the Croatia national under-16 basketball team at the 2010 FIBA Europe Under-16 Championship where his team won the gold medal. He was the team's leader in scoring and rebounds second to Dario Šarić only. He missed the 2012 FIBA Europe Under-18 Championship where Croatia won gold again because of an injury. He later played at the 2011 FIBA Under-19 World Championship and 2014 FIBA Europe Under-20 Championship, winning the 8th and 4th place respectively.

Bundović debuted for the Croatian A team in November 2021 at the 2023 FIBA Basketball World Cup qualification game against Slovenia. He was the top scorer for Croatia at that game.
