= 2014–15 A-1 League =

A-1 League
- Season: 2014–15
- Duration: October 4, 2014 – June 13, 2015
- Teams: 11 + 3
- TV partner(s): HRT; SportKlub

Regular season
- Top seed: Cedevita
- Promoted: Škrljevo
- Relegated: Slavonski Brod (withdrew)

Finals
- Champions: Cedevita; 2nd title
- Runners-up: Cibona
- Semifinalists: Zadar; Zagreb

Statistical leaders
Points	(Croatia) Filip Tončinić (Vrijednosnice Osijek)	20.8
Rebounds	(Croatia) Filip Tončinić (Vrijednosnice Osijek)	8.8
Assists	(Croatia) Lovre Bašić (Zadar)	5.9
- All statistics correct as of 01 December 2015.

The 2014–15 A-1 League (Croatian: A-1 liga 2014./15.) was the 24th season of the A-1 League, the highest professional basketball league in Croatia.

The first half of the season consisted of 10 teams and 90-game regular season. For second half of the season clubs was divided into two groups. Championship group consisted of 3 teams from ABA League and the best 5 teams from first half of the season. Relegation group consisted of bottom 5 teams from first half of the season.

Cedevita won its second Croatian league title against Cibona with a 3–1 win in the final series.

== Teams and venues ==
- Withdrew
  - ~~Križevci~~ (11th)
- Promoted from A-2 Liga
  - Ribola Kaštela (Champion)
  - Gorica (Runner-up)

	Teams	Team	City	Venue (Capacity)
Regular season teams	11			
Regular season teams	11	Alkar	Sinj	Športska dvorana Sinj (1,500)
Regular season teams	11	Gorica	Velika Gorica	Dvorana srednjih škola Velika Gorica (1,000)
Regular season teams	11	Jolly Jadranska banka Šibenik	Šibenik	Sportska dvorana Baldekin (1,500)
Regular season teams	11	Kvarner 2010	Rijeka	Dvorana Dinko Lukarić (1,100)
Regular season teams	11	Ribola Kaštela	Kaštela	Školska športska dvorana Kaštel Sućurac (1,600)
Regular season teams	11	Slavonski Brod	Slavonski Brod	Športska dvorana Vijuš (2,200)
Regular season teams	11	Split	Split	Arena Gripe (6,000)
Regular season teams	11	Šibenik	Šibenik	Sportska dvorana Baldekin (1,500)
Regular season teams	11	Vrijednosnice Osijek	Osijek	Gradski vrt Hall (1,448)
Regular season teams	11	Zabok	Zabok	Športska dvorana Bedekovčina (2,500)
Regular season teams	11	Zagreb	Zagreb	Športska dvorana Trnsko (2,500)
Teams already qualified for Championship Round	3			
Teams already qualified for Championship Round	3	Cedevita	Zagreb	Dom Sportova (3,100)
Teams already qualified for Championship Round	3	Cibona	Zagreb	Dražen Petrović Basketball Hall (5,400)
Teams already qualified for Championship Round	3	Zadar	Zadar	Krešimir Ćosić Hall (8,500)

Location of teams in the A-1 League 2013–14

== Regular season ==
Pos	Team	Pld	W	L	PF	PA	PD	Pts	Qualification or relegation
1	Zagreb	20	15	5	1654	1453	+201	35	Clinched champions league berth
2	Zabok	20	14	6	1489	1426	+63	34	Clinched champions league berth
3	Šibenik	20	14	6	1576	1515	+61	34	Clinched champions league berth
4	Kvarner 2010	20	13	7	1640	1511	+129	33	Clinched champions league berth
5	Alkar	20	11	9	1496	1467	+29	31	Clinched champions league berth
6	Jolly JBŠ	20	11	9	1432	1427	+5	31	
7	Split	20	8	12	1463	1463	0	28	
8	Ribola Kaštela	20	8	12	1602	1668	−66	28	
9	Gorica	20	7	13	1539	1581	−42	27	
10	Vrijednosnice Osijek	20	7	13	1412	1498	−86	27	
11	Slavonski Brod (Note: KK Slavonski Brod ceased to exist due to financial troubles in December 2014)	20	2	18	708	1002	−294	22	Relegated

Source: Crosarka.com & Scoresway.com

=== Results ===
Home \ Away	ALK	GOR	JOL	KVA	KŠT	SBR	SPL	ŠIB	VRO	ZAB	ZAG
Alkar		81–79	69–59	92–78	88–59	20–0	72–62	83–89	81–89	96–93	66–90
Gorica	87–67		63–76	67–84	109–77	20–0	75–87	85–89	94–82	60–70	70–78
Jolly	79–71	90–76		81–65	76–71	76–68	70–63	70–86	77–68	73–61	52–59
Kvarner	90–68	93–69	83–72		90–72	92–82	73–69	99–85	91–68	93–81	76–81
Kaštela	73–68	97–105	96–85	88–97		20–0	85–83	74–83	87–76	66–75	101–90
Slavonski Brod	65–86	71–72	0–20	0–20	90–88		0–20	0–20	74–64	0–20	58–97
Split	67–73	83–87	66–69	92–79	81–85	83–79		79–70	81–65	78–64	84–72
GKK Šibenik	79–78	86–70	86–65	106–101	86–102	80–62	95–86		73–60	65–75	92–91
Vrijednosnice Osijek	64–81	86–80	88–79	68–84	85–75	20–0	83–56	64–66		60–70	76–74
Zabok	78–67	87–86	77–59	82–79	116–110	64–59	77–74	83–82	80–73		76–78
Zagreb	87–89	97–85	111–104	88–73	85–76	20–0	90–69	89–72	95–73	82–61	

Source: Scoresway.com
Legend: Blue = home team win; Yellow = draw; Red = away team win.

== Championship round ==
Pos	Team	Pld	W	L	PF	PA	PD	Pts	Qualification	CED	CIB	ZD	ZAG	ŠIB	KVA	ZAB	ALK
1	Cedevita	14	12	2	1260	954	+306	26	Clinched playoffs berth		76–77	93–68	95–77	83–71	90–58	104–75	99–46
2	Cibona	14	11	3	1143	988	+155	25	Clinched playoffs berth	70–90		78–67	107–62	84–73	88–72	96–62	90–69
3	Zadar	14	10	4	1087	960	+127	24	Clinched playoffs berth	68–54	70–60		64–71	79–74	89–60	98–64	77–63
4	Zagreb	14	7	7	1107	1135	−28	21	Clinched playoffs berth	91–92	74–75	79–88		84–89	85–72	91–88	75–63
5	Šibenik	14	7	7	1055	1086	−31	21		59–104	71–61	61–73	91–97		74–77	72–63	77–67
6	Kvarner	14	5	9	1072	1141	−69	19		75–87	71–88	86–85	80–74	81–85		88–68	97–66
7	Zabok	14	2	12	963	1192	−229	16		53–95	61–81	56–80	62–71	78–91	90–84		71–61
8	Alkar	14	2	12	908	1139	−231	16		66–98	70–88	61–81	69–76	55–67	72–71	80–72	

Source: Scoresway.com

== Relegation and promotion rounds ==
=== Relegation round ===
Teams "carried" the results of the matches played between them from the regular season.

Pos	Team	Pld	W	L	PF	PA	PD	Pts	Qualification	JOL	GOR	KŠT	VRO	SPL
1	Jolly JBŠ	16	10	6	1297	1221	+76	26			87–91	75–81	94–65	72–66
2	Gorica	16	8	8	1377	1381	−4	24		93–87		87–79	84–86	77–83
3	Ribola Kaštela	16	8	8	1307	1382	−75	24		84–111	97–92		777–75	74–83
4	Vrijednosnice Osijek	16	7	9	1256	1284	−28	23		84–72	85–98	71–75		84–77
5	Split	16	7	9	1240	1209	+31	23	Relegation/promotion play off	66–77	99–66	88–67	78–72	

=== Promotion round ===
Pos	Team	Pld	W	L	PF	PA	PD	Pts	Promotion or qualification	ŠKR	HER	POD	JAZ	POŽ
1	Škrljevo	8	6	2	692	574	+118	14	Promotion		75–60	117–75	79–84	100–63
2	Hermes Analitica	8	6	2	724	661	+63	14	Promotion/relegation play off	80–82		100–89	99–87	108–77
3	Podravac	8	4	4	627	642	−15	12		68–78	72–76		80–78	89–58
4	Jazine	8	4	4	680	637	+43	12		82–76	91–100	70–76		85–64
5	Požega	8	0	8	540	749	−209	8		62–85	88–101	65–78	63–103	

=== Relegation/Promotion play-off ===
Relegation league 5th-placed team faces the 2nd-placed Promotion league side in a two-legged play-off. The winner on aggregate score after both matches will earn a spot in the 2015–16 A-1 League.

==== Hermes Analitica vs. Split ====
May 19
18:45

Hermes Analitica	90–103	Split
Scoring by quarter: 22-29, 17-31, 32-17, 19-26

Sportska dvorana KGTŠ, Zagreb

May 23
18:30

Split	91–79	Hermes Analitica
Scoring by quarter: 28-20, 20-21, 15-19, 28-19

Arena Gripe, Split

Split retained its A-1 League status.

== Playoffs ==
=== Bracket ===
Semifinals
1	Cedevita	2
4	Zagreb	0
2	Cibona	2
3	Zadar	0

Finals
1	Cedevita	3
2	Cibona	1
