= Ante Krapić =

Croatian basketball player

No. 23 – Bosco
- Position: Forward
- League: Prva muška liga

Personal information
- Born: December 19, 1985 (age 40) Zadar, SR Croatia, SFR Yugoslavia
- Listed height: 6 ft 8 in (2.03 m)

Career information
- Playing career: 2003–present

Career history
- 2003–2006: Borik-Puntamika
- 2006–2007: Kaptol
- 2007–2008: Borik-Puntamika
- 2008–2010: Zabok
- 2010–2011: Cibona
- 2011–2012: Zadar
- 2012–2013: Zagreb
- 2013–2014: Pitesti
- 2014: Ploiești
- 2014–2015: ZTE
- 2015–2016: KK Zabok
- 2016: Lietkabelis Panevėžys
- 2016–2018: Zagreb
- 2018–2019: Hermes Analitica
- 2019–2020: SZTE-Szedeák
- 2020: Hermes Analitica
- 2020–2021: Gorica
- 2021–present: Bosco

Career highlights
- Romanian League champion (2014)

Ante Krapić (born December 19, 1985) is a Croatian professional basketball player currently playing for Bosco of the Croatian second-tier Prva muška liga. Standing at 2.03 m, he plays at the forward positions.
