= 2022–23 ABA League Second Division =

European basketball league

ABA League Second Division
- Season: 2022–23
- Duration: October 2022 – April 2023
- Games played: 13 each
- Teams: 14
- TV partner: Arena Sport
- All statistics correct as of February 26, 2022.

The 2022–23 ABA League Second Division is the 6th season of the ABA Second Division with 14 teams from Bosnia and Herzegovina, Croatia, Montenegro, North Macedonia, Serbia, and Slovenia participating in it.

== Clubs ==
A total of 14 clubs contest the league for the 2022–23 season, based on the results in the domestic championships and taking into consideration the results in the previous season. On the ABA Assembly session, held on 19 July 2022 in Zagreb, was confirmed clubs for the 2022–23 season.

=== Distribution ===
The following is the access list for this season.

Access list for the 2022–23 ABA League Second Division
	Clubs entering in this round	Clubs advancing from the previous round
Regular season (14 clubs)	2 highest-placed clubs from each of the six national leagues (12 in total); 1 club relegated from the 2021-22 ABA League First Division; 1 club with a wild card	
Playoffs (8 clubs)		8 highest-placed clubs from the regular season

=== Club allocation ===
Location of teams in the 2022–23 season

The labels in the parentheses show how each team qualified for the place of its starting round:

- 1st–5th: Positions in national leagues at the end of season.
- ABA1: Relegated from the First Division.
- TH: Title holder.
- WC: Wild card.

Regular season
(Basketball Federation of Bosnia and Herzegovina) Široki (2nd)	(Basketball Federation of Slovenia) Helios Suns (2nd)	(Basketball Federation of Montenegro) Sutjeska (2nd)	(Basketball Federation of Serbia) Zlatibor (1st)^{TH}
(Basketball Federation of Bosnia and Herzegovina) Spars Ilidža (3rd)	(Basketball Federation of Slovenia) GGD Šenčur (3rd)	(Basketball Federation of Montenegro) Podgorica (3rd)	(Basketball Federation of Serbia) Sloga (2nd)
(Basketball Federation of Bosnia and Herzegovina) Borac Banja Luka (5th)^{WC}	(Croatian Basketball Federation) Gorica (4th)	(Basketball Federation of North Macedonia) Pelister (2nd)	
(Basketball Federation of Slovenia) Krka (ABA1)	(Croatian Basketball Federation) Vrijednosnice (12th)	(Basketball Federation of North Macedonia) TFT Skopje (4th)	

Bosnian clubs Leotar and Sloboda Tuzla failed to receive wildcards.

=== Personnel and sponsorship ===
Team	Home city	Head coach	Captain	Kit manufacturer	Shirt sponsor
Borac Banja Luka	Banja Luka	(Montenegro) Zoran Kašćelan	(Bosnia and Herzegovina) Srđan Gavrić	Kelme	wwin
Gorica	Velika Gorica	(Croatia) Braslav Turić	(Bosnia and Herzegovina) Ante Mašić	Alpas	—
Helios Suns	Domžale	(Slovenia) Dejan Jakara	(Slovenia) Aljaž Bratec	Spalding	Helios / Triglav
Krka	Novo Mesto	(Slovenia) Gašper Okorn	(Croatia) Rok Stipčević	Peak	Krka
Pelister	Bitola	(North Macedonia) Marjan Ilievski	(North Macedonia) Boban Stajić	Unit sport	—
Podgorica	Podgorica	(Montenegro) Nebojša Bogavac	(Montenegro) Vladan Kaluđerović	NetS	Bemax
Sloga	Kraljevo	(Serbia) Marko Dimitrijević	(Serbia) Stefan Matović	Maluro	—
Spars Ilidža	Ilidža	(Montenegro) Miodrag Kadija	(Bosnia and Herzegovina) Harun Zrno	No1	Visit Sarajevo
Sutjeska	Nikšić	(Montenegro) Darko Vujačić	(Montenegro) Marko Ćalić	Ardu Sport	—
GGD Šenčur	Šenčur	(Serbia) Miljan Pavković	(Slovenia) Dino Murić		GGD / ELCI
Široki	Široki Brijeg	(Bosnia and Herzegovina) Ivan Velić	(Bosnia and Herzegovina) Jure Zubac	Ardu Sport	TT Kabeli
TFT Skopje	Skopje	(North Macedonia) Boro Smilkovski	(North Macedonia) Edis Nuri		—
Vrijednosnice	Osijek	(Croatia) Srđan Heblich	(Croatia) Veljko Budimir	STX	VROS
Zlatibor	Čajetina	(Serbia) Strajin Nedović	(Serbia) Nemanja Protić	Ardu Sport	Boje i fasade Maxima

=== Coaching changes ===
Team	Outgoing manager	Date of vacancy	Position in table	Replaced with	Date of appointment	Ref.
Borac Banja Luka	(Serbia) Dragan Nikolić	17 April 2022	Off-season	(Montenegro) Zoran Kašćelan	17 April 2022	
Krka	(Slovenia) Dalibor Damjanović	June 2022	Off-season	(Slovenia) Gašper Okorn	24 June 2022	
Široki	(Croatia) Danijel Jusup	7 July 2022	Off-season	(Bosnia and Herzegovina) Ivan Velić	22 July 2022	
Gorica	(Croatia) Mladen Starčević	July 2022	Off-season	(Croatia) Vladimir Krstić	29 July 2022	
Gorica	(Croatia) Vladimir Krstić	15 November 2022	13th (0–2)	(Croatia) Braslav Turić	15 November 2022	

== Regular season ==
The Regular season is split in five tournaments featuring two or three rounds.

=== League table ===
Pos	Team	Pld	W	L	PF	PA	PD	Pts	Qualification or relegation
1	(Basketball Federation of Slovenia) Helios Suns	13	12	1	1154	937	+217	25	Advance to the Playoffs
2	(Basketball Federation of Slovenia) Krka	13	10	3	1114	1013	+101	23	Advance to the Playoffs
3	(Basketball Federation of Montenegro) Podgorica	13	9	4	1026	910	+116	22	Advance to the Playoffs
4	(Basketball Federation of Bosnia and Herzegovina) Borac WWIN	13	9	4	1077	961	+116	22	Advance to the Playoffs
5	(Basketball Federation of Bosnia and Herzegovina) Široki	13	9	4	1008	958	+50	22	Advance to the Playoffs
6	(Basketball Federation of Serbia) Zlatibor	13	9	4	1120	1022	+98	22	Advance to the Playoffs
7	(Basketball Federation of Montenegro) Sutjeska	13	8	5	983	940	+43	21	Advance to the Playoffs
8	(Basketball Federation of North Macedonia) Pelister	13	7	6	1052	1067	−15	20	Advance to the Playoffs
9	(Basketball Federation of Serbia) Sloga	13	6	7	1023	1064	−41	19	
10	(Basketball Federation of Slovenia) GGD Šenčur	13	4	9	942	968	−26	17	
11	(Basketball Federation of North Macedonia) TFT Skopje	13	3	10	984	1129	−145	16	
12	(Basketball Federation of Bosnia and Herzegovina) Spars Ilidža	13	2	11	962	1153	−191	15	
13	(Croatian Basketball Federation) Gorica	13	2	11	962	1135	−173	15	
14	(Croatian Basketball Federation) Vrijednosnice	13	1	12	944	1094	−150	14	

Source: ABA2

== Playoffs ==
Based on the results and position of the clubs in the standings after the regular season, Playoffs will take place with teams from 1st to 8th position. The Quarterfinals will be played in knockout pairs 1–8, 2–7, 3–6, 4–5. The winners of the Quarterfinals will qualify to the Semifinals and the winners of the Semifinals will play the Final.

=== Bracket ===
Knock-out elimination phases were played under single-game format.

Quarterfinals
12 April
1 (Basketball Federation of Slovenia) Helios Suns	101
8 (Basketball Federation of North Macedonia) Pelister	47
12 April
4 (Basketball Federation of Bosnia and Herzegovina) Borac Banja Luka	72
5 (Basketball Federation of Bosnia and Herzegovina) Široki	80
12 April
2 (Basketball Federation of Slovenia) Krka	91
7 (Basketball Federation of Montenegro) Sutjeska	82
12 April
3 (Basketball Federation of Montenegro) Podgorica	89
6 (Basketball Federation of Serbia) Zlatibor	64

Semifinals
14 April
1 (Basketball Federation of Slovenia) Helios Suns	91
5 (Basketball Federation of Bosnia and Herzegovina) Široki	71
14 April
2 (Basketball Federation of Slovenia) Krka	86
3 (Basketball Federation of Montenegro) Podgorica	74

Final
16 April
1 (Basketball Federation of Slovenia) Helios Suns	82
2 (Basketball Federation of Slovenia) Krka	83

== Clubs in European competitions ==
Competition	Team	Progress	Result
Basketball Champions League	(North Macedonia) TFT Skopje	Qualifying rounds, Group A	Eliminated in quarterfinals by (Germany) Niners Chemnitz, 77–96

== See also ==
- List of current ABA League Second Division team rosters
- 2022–23 ABA League First Division

2022–23 domestic competitions

- (Basketball Federation of Bosnia and Herzegovina) 2022–23 Basketball Championship of Bosnia and Herzegovina
- (Croatian Basketball Federation) 2022–23 HT Premijer liga
- (Basketball Federation of Montenegro) 2022–23 Prva A liga
- (Basketball Federation of North Macedonia) 2022–23 Macedonian First League
- (Basketball Federation of Serbia) 2022–23 Basketball League of Serbia
- (Basketball Federation of Slovenia) 2022–23 Slovenian Basketball League

== Notes ==
1. In case of Serbia (Basketball League of Serbia) and Montenegro (Prva A Liga), playoff round results in their leagues are not considered for the ABA 2 League qualification.
