= Damir Markota =

Croatian basketball player

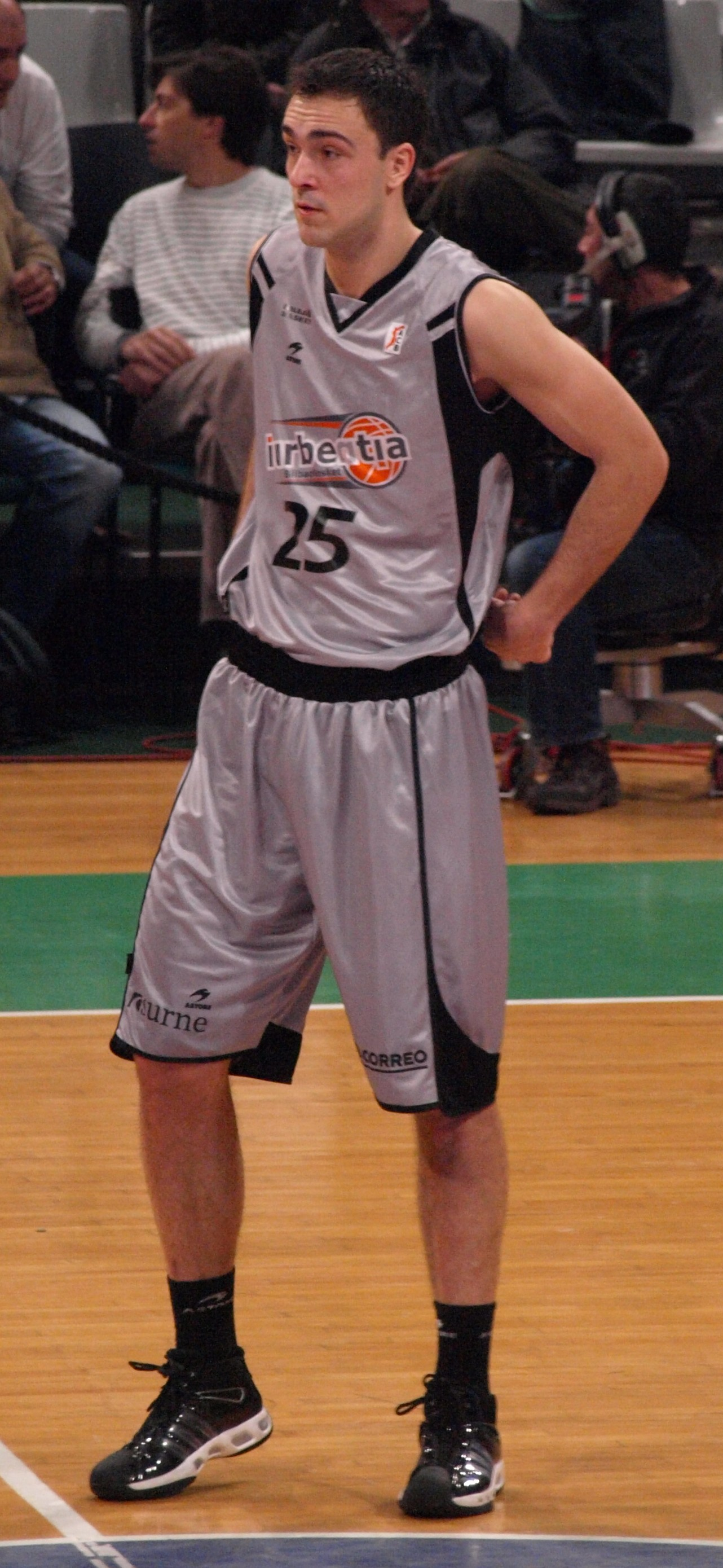
- Markota with Iurbentia Bilbao in 2009

Personal information
- Born: December 26, 1985 (age 40) Sarajevo, SR Bosnia and Herzegovina, SFR Yugoslavia
- Listed height: 2.08 m (6 ft 10 in)
- Listed weight: 102 kg (225 lb)

Career information
- NBA draft: 2006: 2nd round, 59th overall pick
- Drafted by: San Antonio Spurs
- Playing career: 2001–2023
- Position: Power forward

Career history
- 2001–2006: Cibona
- 2001–2002: →Zabok
- 2002–2003: →Šanac Karlovac
- 2006–2007: Milwaukee Bucks
- 2007: Tulsa 66ers
- 2007–2008: Spartak St. Petersburg
- 2008: Žalgiris Kaunas
- 2008: Cibona
- 2008–2009: ViveMenorca
- 2009–2010: Bilbao Basket
- 2010–2012: Union Olimpija
- 2012: Zagreb
- 2012–2013: Beşiktaş
- 2013: Brose Baskets
- 2013–2014: Bilbao Basket
- 2014–2015: Cibona
- 2015–2017: İstanbul BB
- 2017: Uşak Sportif
- 2017–2018: Cedevita
- 2018–2019: Cibona
- 2019–2020: Mornar
- 2020: Zabok
- 2020–2021: Cibona
- 2022–2023: Dinamo Zagreb

Career highlights
- Baltic League champion (2008); 3× Croatian League champion (2006, 2018, 2019); Lithuanian League champion (2008); Lithuanian Cup winner (2008); Slovenian Cup winner (2011); Croatian Cup winner (2018)
- Stats at NBA.com
- Stats at Basketball Reference

Damir Markota (born Damir Omerhodžić on December 26, 1985) is a Croatian former professional basketball player. Standing at 2.08 m (6 ft 10 in), he plays at the power forward position.

== Professional career ==
Markota, born in Sarajevo (then SR Bosnia and Herzegovina, SFR Yugoslavia), fled Bosnia during the war and settled in Sweden, where he began to practice basketball. He played together with Maciej Lampe in Stockholm, until moving to Croatia when he was fourteen, after being invited to play in the Croatian league. Markota signed with KK Cibona, but was loaned to Zabok and Karlovac Šanac until the end of 2002–03. Subsequently, he received Croatian citizenship (holding Swedish as well), declining an offer to play for the Swedish national basketball team.

Markota was an early candidate for the 2004 NBA draft, but soon withdrew his name from consideration. He was later invited to the Croatian national team, and in 2005 he changed his last name from "Omerhodžić" to "Markota" (his mother's maiden name).

He was eventually chosen by the San Antonio Spurs in the second round of the 2006 NBA draft, 59th overall, then immediately traded to the Milwaukee Bucks. During the summer of 2006, the Bucks signed Markota to a multi-year contract after the Spurs traded his draft rights for the higher of the Bucks’ two 2007 NBA draft second-round picks.

In February 2007, the Bucks assigned Markota to Tulsa 66ers of the NBA Development League, in order to further improve his play.

On September 7, Markota was waived by the Bucks, and signed with Russian team Spartak St. Petersburg on a two-year contract two days later. However, in early 2008, he switched to Lithuanian club Žalgiris Kaunas.

On August 14, 2008, Markota was signed by Cibona, returning to the team he represented as a youngster but, after a series of unsatisfying performances upon recovering form knee injury, he was suspended for clashing with the coach.

On October 28, 2008 ViveMenorca, of the Spanish ACB, announced the signing of Markota. In January 2009, he joined Iurbentia Bilbao.

On September 1, 2010, he signed a one-year deal with Union Olimpija in Slovenia. In January 2012 he left Union Olimpija due to lack of payment and signed with KK Zagreb.

He signed a contract with Beşiktaş in August 2012. On September 27, 2013, he signed a three-month contract with Brose Baskets. On November 25, 2013, he signed with his former club Bilbao Basket until the end of the season.

In October 2014 Markota returns to Cibona for the third time signing a contract to last until the end of the season. On January 2, 2015, he parted ways with Cibona. The same day he signed with Turkish team İstanbul BB.

On June 17, 2017, Markota signed with Turkish club Uşak Sportif. On December 4, 2017, he parted ways with Uşak, and signed with Croatian club Cedevita.

In September 2018 Markota returned to Cibona for the fourth time in his career.

In July 2019 Markota signed with the Montenegrin Mornar.

Markota started the 2020–21 season with the Croatian side Zabok but on October 23, 2020, he signed with Cibona for the fifth time in his career. After a conflict with coach Vladimir Jovanović, in April 2021, Markota left Cibona.

In February 2022, Markota signed with Dinamo of the Croatian second-tier Prva muška liga.

== National team career ==
Markota has also been a member of the senior men's Croatian national basketball team. With Croatia's senior national team, he played at the EuroBasket 2007, EuroBasket 2011, EuroBasket 2013 and the 2014 FIBA Basketball World Cup.

== Career statistics ==
=== NBA ===
==== Regular season ====
| Year | Team | GP | GS | MPG | FG% | 3P% | FT% | RPG | APG | SPG | BPG | PPG |
|---|---|---|---|---|---|---|---|---|---|---|---|---|
| 2006–07 | Milwaukee | 30 | 0 | 5.7 | .365 | .375 | .636 | 1.0 | .2 | .1 | .0 | 1.7 |
| Career | | 30 | 0 | 5.7 | .365 | .375 | .636 | 1.0 | .2 | .1 | .0 | 1.7 |

Legend
| GP | Games played | GS | Games started | MPG | Minutes per game |
| FG% | Field-goal percentage | 3P% | 3-point field-goal percentage | FT% | Free-throw percentage |
| RPG | Rebounds per game | APG | Assists per game | SPG | Steals per game |
| BPG | Blocks per game | PPG | Points per game | PIR | Performance index rating |
| **Bold** | Career high |

=== EuroLeague ===
| Year | Team | GP | GS | MPG | FG% | 3P% | FT% | RPG | APG | SPG | BPG | PPG | PIR |
|---|---|---|---|---|---|---|---|---|---|---|---|---|---|
| 2001–02 | Cibona | 1 | 0 | .2 | .000 | .000 | .000 | .0 | .0 | .0 | .0 | .0 | .0 |
| 2003–04 | Cibona | 1 | 0 | 2.0 | .1000 | .000 | .000 | 1.0 | .0 | .0 | .0 | 2.0 | 2.0 |
| 2004–05 | Cibona | 11 | 8 | 13.3 | .435 | .238 | .500 | 2.0 | .4 | .4 | .1 | 3.5 | 1.4 |
| 2005–06 | Cibona | 19 | 0 | 20.1 | .610 | .323 | .615 | 5.1 | .6 | .4 | .3 | 7.8 | 8.1 |
| 2007–08 | Žalgiris | 6 | 0 | 13.2 | .462 | .200 | .1000 | 2.0 | .8 | .3 | .5 | 3.5 | 2.0 |
| 2010–11 | Union Olimpija | 15 | 15 | 26.2 | .508 | .275 | .724 | 4.5 | 1.9 | .7 | .1 | 8.5 | 8.8 |
| 2011–12 | Union Olimpija | 7 | 5 | 26.0 | .769 | .143 | .700 | 6.0 | 1.4 | .4 | .1 | 4.7 | 9.1 |
| 2012–13 | Beşiktaş | 24 | 17 | 24.2 | .510 | .319 | .824 | 5.1 | 1.4 | .7 | .2 | 8.7 | 10.2 |
| 2013–14 | Brose Baskets | 6 | 3 | 16.3 | .500 | .214 | .000 | 2.7 | 1.0 | .5 | .0 | 4.2 | 4.3 |

== See also ==
- List of youngest EuroLeague players
