= Bariša Krasić =

Bosnian basketball player and coach

Personal information
- Born: 16 September 1978 (age 48) Mostar, SR Bosnia and Herzegovina, SFR Yugoslavia
- Listed height: 6 ft 8 in (2.03 m)

Career information
- Playing career: 1999–2015
- Position: Power forward
- Coaching career: 2015–present

Career history

Playing
- 1999–2002: HKK Brotnjo Čitluk
- 2001–2004: Cibona
- 2004–2005: Panellinios
- 2005–2006: Artland Dragons
- 2006: Cedevita
- 2006–2008: Cibona
- 2008–2009: Keravnos
- 2009–2010: Cedevita
- 2011–2012: Bosco
- 2012–2013: Zadar
- 2013–2014: ETHA Engomis
- 2014: Rabotnički
- 2014: Sigal Prishtina
- 2014–2015: Velika Gorica

Coaching
- 2015–2017: Cibona (assistant)
- 2018–2022: Cibona (assistant)
- 2022: Cibona (interim)
- 2022–2024: Cibona (assistant)
- 2024: Cibona

Career highlights
- As player: 2× Croatian League champion (2002, 2007); Croatian Cup winner (2002); As assistant coach: 2× Croatian League champion (2019, 2022); 2× Croatian Cup winner (2022, 2023)

Bariša Krasić (born 16 September 1978) is a Bosnian professional basketball coach and former player who last served as head coach for Cibona of the ABA League and the Croatian League.

Krasić started his career playing with HKK Brotnjo Čitluk, the local club of his hometown of Čitluk near Međugorje, Bosnia and Herzegovina. He played for the Bosnia and Herzegovina national team. He last played for Velika Gorica.
