= Jasmin Repeša =

Croatian basketball coach

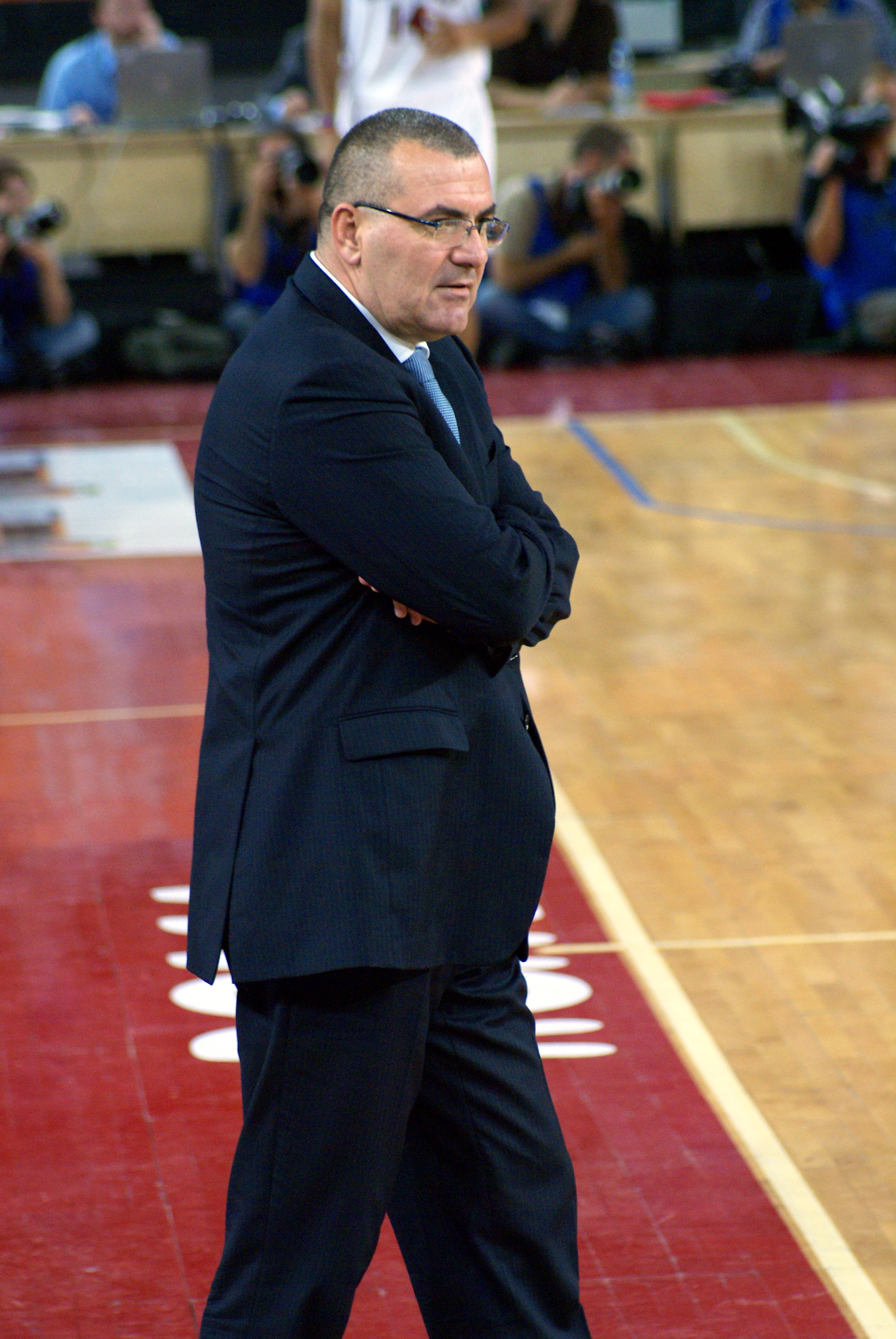
- Repeša with Lottomatica Roma in 2007

Napoli Basket
- Title: Head coach
- League: LBA; EuroCup

Personal information
- Born: 1 June 1961 (age 65) Čapljina, PR Bosnia and Herzegovina, FPR Yugoslavia

Career information
- Playing career: 1978–1988
- Position: Power forward / center
- Coaching career: 1986–present

Career history

Playing
- 1978–1988: Čapljina

Coaching
- 1986–1988: Čapljina
- 1990–1992: Novi Zagreb (assistant)
- 1992–1994: Cibona (assistant)
- 1994–1995: Dubrava
- 1995–1996: Croatia (assistant)
- 1995–1997: Cibona
- 1997–2000: Tofaş
- 2000–2001: Split
- 2001: Śląsk Wrocław
- 2001–2002: Cibona
- 2002–2006: Fortitudo Bologna
- 2006–2008: Virtus Roma
- 2006–2009: Croatia
- 2010–2011: Benetton Treviso
- 2011–2012: Cibona
- 2012–2015: Croatia
- 2012–2013: Unicaja Málaga
- 2013–2015: Cedevita
- 2015–2017: Olimpia Milano
- 2018: Bosnia and Herzegovina
- 2018–2019: Budućnost
- 2020–2021: VL Pesaro
- 2021: Fortitudo Bologna
- 2022–2023: VL Pesaro
- 2024–2025: Trapani Shark
- 2026–present: Napoli

Career highlights
- As a head coach: 6× Croatian League champion (1996, 1997, 2002, 2012, 2014, 2015); 2× Turkish League champion (1999, 2000); 2× Italian League champion (2005, 2016); 4× Croatian Cup winner (1996, 2002, 2014, 2015); 2× Turkish Cup winner (1999, 2000); 2× Italian Cup winner (2016, 2017); Montenegrin Cup winner (2019); 2× Italian Supercup winner (2005, 2016); FIBA European Selection Team (1996)

Jasmin Repeša (born 1 June 1961) is a Bosnian-born Croatian professional basketball coach, and former player. He currently serves as head coach for Napoli of the Italian Lega Basket Serie A (LBA) and the EuroCup.

Repeša has won numerous pro club competitions during his coaching career, and was also a somewhat successful basketball player during his playing days, especially with KK Čapljina early on in his pro career. His son Dino, born in 1992, is also working as a basketball coach.

== Early life ==
Repeša was a basketball player for his hometown team KK Čapljina during the 1980s.

== Coaching career ==
On 21 June 2013, Repeša was appointed head coach of Cedevita of the Croatian League. His son Dino was named his assistant. In his inaugural season, the club won the domestic league championship and managed to reach the semifinals of the ABA League playoffs. In April 2015 Repeša announced his departure from Cedevita bench at the end of the season, citing health reasons. On 25 June he officially resigned and was replaced with Veljko Mršić, his assistant.

On 26 June 2015, Repeša signed a contract to become the head coach of Italian team Olimpia Milano. In June 2017 he was sacked. On 30 December 2018, Repeša was named the head coach of Budućnost, after Aleksandar Džikić resigned. In April 2019 following a loss to Crvena zvezda in the ABA League finals, Repeša resigned.

On 23 June 2020, Repeša came back to Italy, signing a deal with Victoria Libertas Pesaro of the LBA. He decided to exit from the contract at the end of the season.

On 24 May 2021, Repeša signed a multi-year contract to come back at Fortitudo Bologna of the Italian Serie A. However, on 26 September 2021, he resigned from his post after only one game of regular season.

After spending a year as the sport manager at the Croatian Basketball Federation, in June 2024, Repeša was announced as the head coach for the newly promoted Trapani Shark of the Italian Lega Basket Serie A. He led the team to the best record of 22–8 in this season, including the team qualified to the 2025 Italian Basketball Cup until being eliminated by the seventh-seeded Trieste in the quarterfinals and he led the team into second place in the league's standings and reaching to the playoffs for the first time in the history. He led the team in the playoffs before being eliminated by Brescia in the semifinals. That means Repeša made his best performance in the season which the team qualified to European competitions in the following 2025–26 Basketball Champions League for the first time in history. On 4 December 2025, Repeša eventually left Trapani.

== Coaching record ==
Legend
G	Games coached	W	Games won	L	Games lost	W–L %	Win-loss %

Note: The EuroLeague is not the only competition in which the team played during the season. He also coached in domestic competition, and regional competition if applicable.

=== EuroLeague ===
Team	Year	G	W	L	W–L%	Result
Cibona	1995–96	16	8	8	.500	Eliminated in group stage
Cibona	1996–97	29	17	12	.586	Eliminated in Top 16 stage
Tofaş	1999–00	26	12	14	.462	Eliminated in group stage
Split	2000–01	23	15	8	.652	Eliminated in quarterfinal stage
Śląsk Wrocław	2001–02	4	0	4	.000	Fired
Cibona	2001–02	8	3	5	.375	Eliminated in regular season
Cibona	2002–03	3	1	2	.333	Fired
Fortitudo Bologna	2002–03	16	9	7	.563	Eliminated in Top 16 stage
Fortitudo Bologna	2003–04	22	14	8	.636	Lost in the final game
Fortitudo Bologna	2004–05	20	16	4	.800	Eliminated in Top 16 stage
Fortitudo Bologna	2005–06	20	12	8	.600	Eliminated in Top 16 stage
Virtus Roma	2006–07	20	7	13	.350	Eliminated in Top 16 stage
Virtus Roma	2007–08	20	8	12	.400	Eliminated in Top 16 stage
Virtus Roma	2008–09	6	5	1	.833	Resigned
Unicaja	2012–13	24	15	9	.625	Eliminated in Top 16 stage
Cedevita	2014–15	10	3	7	.300	Eliminated in regular season
Olimpia Milano	2015–16	10	3	7	.300	Eliminated in regular season
Olimpia Milano	2016–17	30	8	22	.267	Eliminated in regular season
Budućnost	2018–19	15	3	12	.200	Eliminated in regular season
Career		322	159	163	.494	

== National team coaching career ==
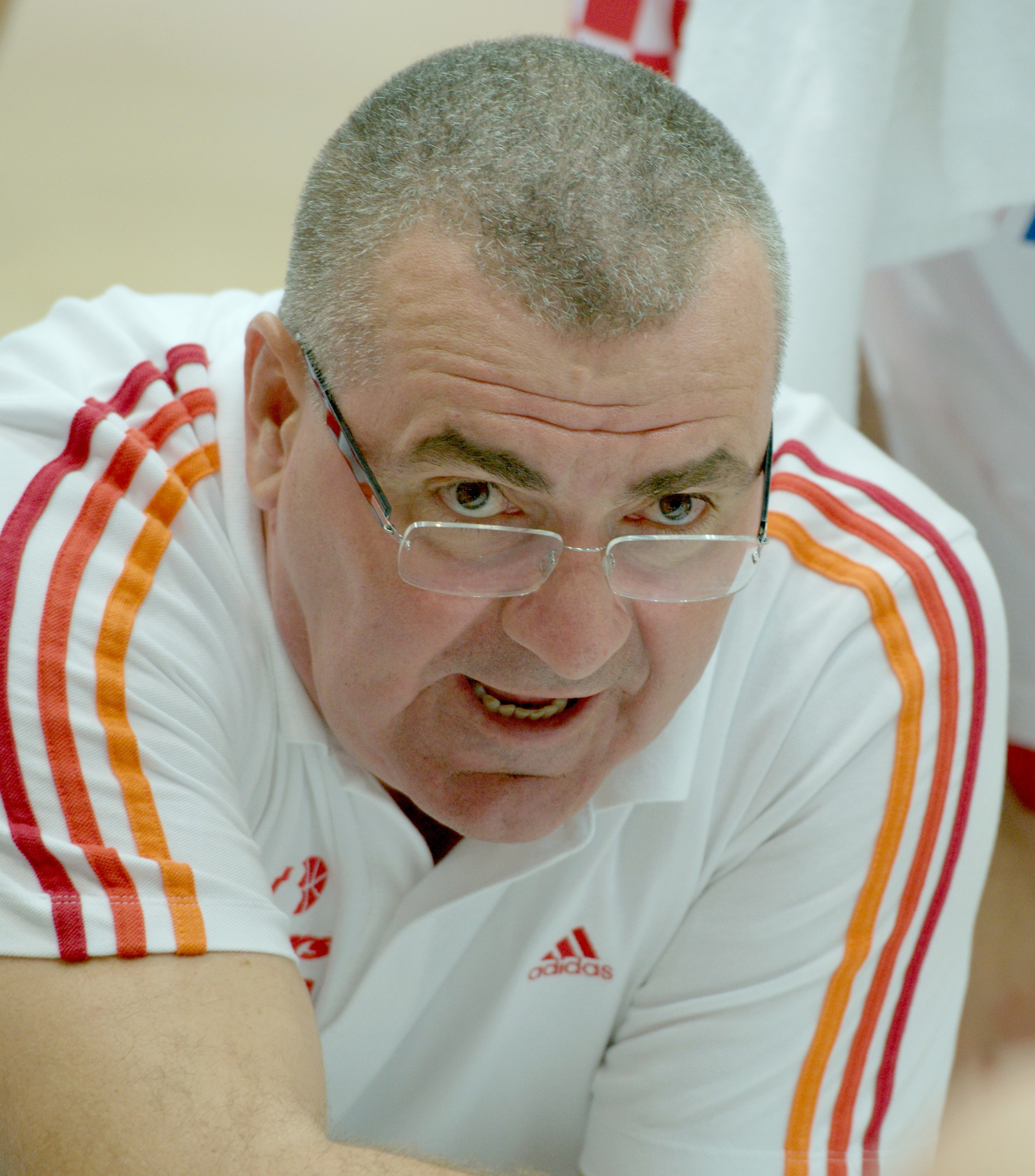
Repeša with Croatia in 2012, during the friendly match against Austria, ahead of the 2013 EuroBasket

In 2005 after Croatia's unsuccessful EuroBasket tournament, Neven Spahija resigned from the national team bench and Repeša took the head coach role. He led the squad at the 2007 EuroBasket, 2008 Summer Olympic Games and at the 2009 EuroBasket.

On 9 February 2012, following the unsuccessful 2011 EuroBasket, Repeša took Croatia bench the second time in his coaching career, this time instead of Josip Vranković, leading the team at the 2013 EuroBasket in Slovenia, where Croatia managed to reach the semifinal of that tournament after 18 years; he also led them at the 2014 World Cup in Brazil, after which Repeša parted ways with the Croatian national team.

On 2 September 2018, Repeša was named the interim head coach of the Bosnia and Herzegovina national basketball team, after Duško Vujošević resigned due to the health reasons. On 12 November 2018, the Basketball Federation of Bosnia and Herzegovina (KSBiH) named Vedran Bosnić as the permanent head coach of the team.
