= Ante Nazor =

Ante Nazor may refer to:

- Ante Nazor (basketball) (born 1978), Croatian basketball coach
- Ante Nazor (historian) (born 1968), Croatian historian
