= Voloder =

Voloder may refer to:

== Places ==
- Voloder, Bosnia and Herzegovina, a village near Bosanska Krupa
- Voloder, Croatia, a village near Popovača

== People ==
- Damir Voloder (born 1959), Croatian basketball coach and player
- Esma Voloder, Bosnian-Australian actress, model and beauty pageant titleholder
- Robert Voloder (born 2001), German footballer
