= Dominik Mavra =

Croatian basketball player

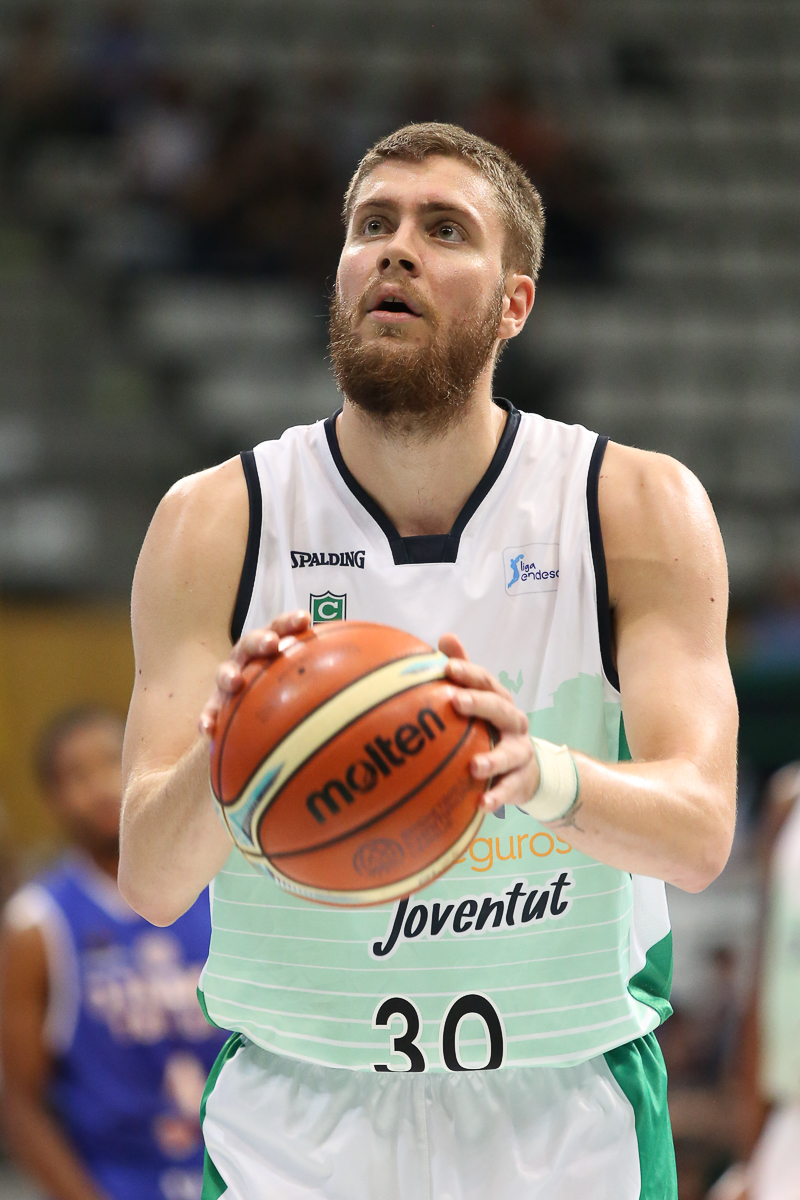
- with Joventut Badalona

No. 19 – Río Breogán
- Position: Point guard
- League: Liga ACB

Personal information
- Born: June 15, 1994 (age 32) Zadar, Croatia
- Listed height: 1.95 m (6 ft 5 in)
- Listed weight: 92 kg (203 lb)

Career information
- NBA draft: 2016: undrafted
- Playing career: 2011–present

Career history
- 2011–2012: Zagreb
- 2013: Split
- 2013–2015: Cibona
- 2015–2016: Dąbrowa Górnicza
- 2016–2017: Karpoš Sokoli
- 2017: Joventut
- 2017–2018: MZT Skopje
- 2018: Lietkabelis
- 2019: Krka
- 2019–2022: Zadar
- 2022–2023: Split
- 2023–2024: Avtodor
- 2024–present: Río Breogán

Career highlights
- Adriatic League champion (2014); Croatian League champion (2021); Macedonian Cup winner (2017); 2× Croatian Cup winner (2020, 2021); Macedonian Cup MVP (2017); Croatian Cup MVP (2020); Croatian League Finals MVP (2021)
Medals
Men's basketball
Representing Croatia
FIBA Europe Under-18 Championship
Gold medal – first place	2012 Lithuania/Latvia	U-18 Team
FIBA Europe Under-16 Championship
Gold medal – first place	2010 Montenegro	U-16 Team

Dominik Mavra (born June 15, 1994) is a Croatian professional basketball player currently playing for Río Breogán of the Spanish League. Standing at 1.95 m (6 ft 5 in), he plays the point guard and shooting guard positions.

== Professional career ==
He started playing basketball in the Zadar youth selections, but was not recognized as a perspective talent a decided to move to Zagreb. Alongside teammates Dario Šarić and Mario Hezonja, he won the 2011 Euroleague Basketball Nike International Junior Tournament. Unsatisfied with his status in the senior team in September 2012 he moved to the Belgian Pepinster, but quickly returned to Zagreb and signed a new contract, without playing any official game for Pepinster. As the situation was not changing to his benefit, in January 2013 Mavra moved to Split. In April 2013, unsatisfied with his play time and unpaid salaries, he left Split.

On December 27, 2013, he signed a contract with Cibona. In his first season in Cibona, Mavra was spending a very limited time on the court and played a minor role in their surprising 2013–14 ABA League championship run. His role in the team changed in December 2014 following the departure of team's then starting point guard Jerel Blassingame, and Mavra started spending much more time on the court. He started the 2015/16 season with a considerable amount of time on court, but with the arrival of James Florence and new head coach Damir Mulaomerović Mavra was sided to the bench and in December 2015 decided to move to the Polish MKS Dąbrowa Górnicza where Dražen Anzulović was head coach.

On October 12, 2016, Mavra signed with Macedonian club Karpoš Sokoli.

On July 25, 2017, Mavra signed with Spanish club Joventut Badalona. On November 3, 2017, he left Joventut and signed with MZT Skopje. On January 14, 2018, at the match of the 16th round between MZT Skopje Aerodrom and Cibona, Dominik Mavra achieved 18 points, 6 rebounds, 10 assists and a valuation of 34 in less than 35 minutes spent on court. He had the highest valuation of the round in the ABA League. On February 5, 2018, he left MZT Skopje.

On February 6, 2018, Mavra signed a contract with BC Lietkabelis of the Lithuanian Basketball League.

On January 16, 2019, Mavra signed with Krka of the Slovenian League and ABA League. He joined Zadar in 2019 and averaged 11 points and 5 assists per game. Mavra re-signed with the team on June 27, 2020.

After spending a season in Split, in July 2023, Mavra signed with the Russian Avtodor of the VTB United League.

After spending a season in Avtodor where he averaged 11 points, 3 rebounds and 5.6 assists in the VTB United League, in November, 2024, Mavra signed with Río Breogán of the Spanish League. There he reunited with coach Veljko Mršić who coached him in Zadar and the Croatia national team as well.

== International career ==
He had a successful career with the Croatian national basketball team youth selections. He won gold at the 2010 FIBA Europe Under-16 Championship and at the 2012 FIBA Europe Under-18 Championship. He also played at the 2013 FIBA Under-19 World Championship and the 2014 FIBA Europe Under-20 Championship where Croatia finished 8th and 4th respectively.

He debuted for the Croatian national basketball team senior team at the 2019 FIBA Basketball World Cup qualifying games.
