= Ante Nazor (basketball) =

Croatian basketball coach

Omiš
- Position: Head coach
- League: First Men's Basketball League

Personal information
- Born: 30 November 1978 (age 47) Split, SR Croatia, SFR Yugoslavia
- Coaching career: 2008–present

Career history

Coaching
- 2008–2009: Posušje
- 2008–2009: Croatia (youth; assistant)
- 2009–2010: Čapljina Lasta
- 2010–2015: Croatia (youth)
- 2010–2011: Omiš
- 2012–2013: Zadar
- 2013–2014: Split
- 2014–2016: Zadar
- 2016–2017: MZT Skopje
- 2017–2018: Cibona
- 2018–2019: Zadar
- 2020: ZTE
- 2021–2022: Prishtina
- 2022–present: Omiš

Career highlights
- Macedonian League champion (2017)
Medals
Men's basketball
Representing Croatia
FIBA U-19 World Cup
Silver medal – second place	2015 Greece	U-19 Team
FIBA U-17 World Cup
Bronze medal – third place	2012 Lithuania	U-17 Team
FIBA Europe Under-18 Championship
Silver medal – second place	2013 Latvia	U-18 Team
Bronze medal – third place	2014 Turkey	U-18 Team
FIBA Europe Under-16 Championship
Gold medal – first place	2011 Czech Republic	U-16 Team

Ante Nazor (born 30 November 1978) is a Croatian professional basketball coach currently serving as the head coach and general manager of all club's youth selections at Omiš Čagalj Tours of the Croatian second-tier First Men's Basketball League.

== Coaching career ==
Nazor started his coaching career in his early twenties as coach of the Split youth teams.

He spent two Olympic cycles coaching the Croatia men's national basketball team youth selections; first as assistant coach to Vlado Vanjak at the 2008 FIBA Europe Under-18 Championship earning the bronze medal, after which he assisted Boro Kurtović at the 2009 FIBA Under-19 World Championship earning the bronze medal again. Next year he became head coach and continued winning medals: gold at the 2011 FIBA Europe Under-16 Championship, bronze at the 2012 FIBA Under-17 World Championship, silver at the 2013 FIBA Europe Under-18 Championship, bronze at the 2014 FIBA Europe Under-18 Championship and silver at the 2015 FIBA Under-19 World Championship.

He coached Zadar during the 2012–13 season, then again during the 2014–15 and 2015–16 seasons.

On 30 November 2016, he was named head coach of MZT Skopje Aerodrom. He helped the team avoid relegation from the ABA League and win the Macedonian League title which was his first club trophy.

On 13 November 2017, he was named head coach of Cibona. At the end of the season in which Cibona lost in the finals of the national cup and championship from their city rivals Cedevita, in June 2018 Nazor and Cibona failed to renew their contract.

On 24 October 2018, he became head coach of Zadar for the third time in his career. After a fairly successful season in which the club avoided relegation from the ABA League First Division and made it the semi-finals of the 2018–19 Croatian League and 2019 Croatian Cup, in June 2019 Nazor signed a new two-year contract with Zadar. On 19 October 2019, he was sacked by the club following the series of poor performance in the opening of the new ABA League season (0–3).

In January 2020, Nazor signed for ZTE of the Hungarian League as head coach. After a series of bad results, in December 2020, Nazor left ZTE.

On 28 June 2021, Nazor was appointed head coach of KB Prishtina of the Kosovo Basketball Superleague.
