= Veljko Mršić =

Croatian basketball coach and player

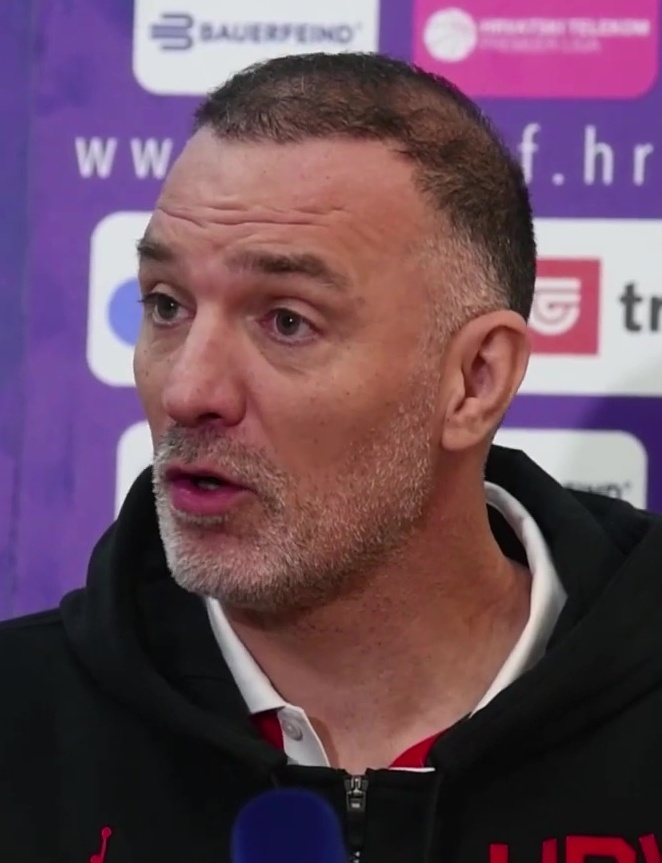
- Mršić in 2021 with the Croatian national team

Personal information
- Born: 13 April 1971 (age 55) Split, SR Croatia, Yugoslavia
- Listed height: 6 ft 8 in (2.03 m)
- Listed weight: 220 lb (100 kg)

Career information
- NBA draft: 1993: undrafted
- Playing career: 1989–2005
- Position: Shooting guard / small forward
- Coaching career: 2006–present

Career history

Playing
- 1989: Borac Čapljina
- 1989–1995: Cibona
- 1996: Nesas
- 1996–1997: Žalgiris Kaunas
- 1997–1998: Cibona
- 1998–1999: Varese
- 1999–2002: Málaga
- 2002: Olympiacos
- 2002–2003: Casademont Girona
- 2003: Pippo Milano
- 2003: Granada
- 2004: Split
- 2004: Ülkerspor
- 2004–2005: Kyiv

Coaching
- 2006: Split
- 2007: Varese
- 2012: Cibona
- 2015–2017: Cedevita
- 2017–2018: Bilbao Basket
- 2019–2022: Croatia (men's)
- 2020–2021: Zadar
- 2022–2024: Río Breogán
- 2025: Split
- 2025–2026: Dinamo Sassari

Career highlights
- As a player: FIBA Korać Cup champion (2001); 5× Croatian League champion (1992–1995, 1998); Lithuanian League champion (1997); Italian League champion (1999); Croatian Cup winner (1995); 2× FIBA European Selection Team (1995, 1998); 2× Spanish ACB All-Star (1999, 2001 (I)); As a head coach: Stanković Cup winner (2019); 4× Croatian League champion (2015–2017, 2021); 4× Croatian Cup winner (2016, 2017, 2021, 2025)
Medals
Men's basketball
Representing Croatia
FIBA World Cup
Bronze medal – third place	1994 Canada
EuroBasket
Bronze medal – third place	1993 Germany
Bronze medal – third place	1995 Greece

Veljko Mršić (pronounced [ʋěːʎko mr̂ʃitɕ]; born 13 April 1971) is a Croatian professional basketball coach and former player, who most recently served as the head coach of Dinamo Sassari of the Lega Basket Serie A (LBA). He has previously worked with many Croatian clubs, and also the national team.

== Playing career ==
Mršić was a member of the FIBA European Selection team in 1995.

== National team career ==
Mršić was a member of the Croatia men's national basketball team, which won bronze medals at the 1994 World Championship, 1993 EuroBasket and at the 1995 EuroBasket. He was also on the squad for the 1996 Summer Olympic Games, 1999 EuroBasket and for the 2001 EuroBasket.

== Coaching career ==
=== Split (2006) ===
Mršić started his head coaching career with his hometown club Split. On 15 June 2006, he was named head coach of the club, but following a series of poor results in the NLB League, he was sacked on 13 December 2006.

=== Varese (2007–2008) ===
Following the dismissal at his hometown, Mršić was appointed head coach for Pallacanestro Varese of the Italian Serie A on 13 June 2007.

=== Cedevita (2011–2012, 2013–2017) ===
In 2011 Mršić was named head coach of the Cedevita junior team, with which he celebrated winning the 2012 Croatian championship title. Later he worked as an assistant coach under Cedevita head coach Jasmin Repeša, who left the club for health reasons in June 2015 when Mršić succeeded him as the new head coach of the senior team.

In Mršić's inaugural season with Cedevita, the club won the Croatian League title and reached the playoffs of the ABA League.

In the following season, Cedevita again won the national league title, but lost the ABA League playoffs final game tie to Serbian team Crvena zvezda. In May 2017 Mršić was fired from Cedevita and replaced by renowned Slovenian coach Jure Zdovc.

=== Cibona (2012) ===
On 11 June 2012, Mršić was named head coach of Cibona. He signed a three-year deal, but on 26 November 2012, he was sacked.

=== Bilbao Basket (2017–2018) ===
On 27 November 2017, Mršić was named head coach of the Spanish Liga ACB team Bilbao Basket. On 30 April 2018, he parted ways with the Spanish team, which was then taken by Slovenian coach Jaka Lakovič.

=== Zadar (2020–2021) ===
On 25 June 2020, Mršić was named head coach of Croatian club Zadar. In his inaugural season at the club, he celebrated winning the national cup title in February 2021.

In June 2021 Mršić led Zadar to win the national league title, for the first time since the 2007–08 season. In July 2021, he left Zadar.

=== Río Breogán (2022–2024) ===
On January 20, 2022, he has signed with Río Breogán of the Liga ACB. In December 2024, after a bad start of the 2024–25 ACB season, winning in only two of the first nine games, Mršić was replaced by Luis Casimiro as the head coach.

=== Split (2025) ===
In January 2025, Mršić was back in Split, the club where he started his coaching career.

=== Dinamo Sassari (2025–2026) ===
On November 4, 2025, Mršić was named head coach of the Italian club Dinamo Sassari of the Lega Basket Serie A (LBA). He was originally tasked with guiding the team away from the relegation fight, but at the end of the season, Sassari was relegated from LBA, and Mršić was not extended as coach.

== Coaching record ==
Legend
G	Games coached	W	Games won	L	Games lost	W–L %	Win-loss %

Note: The EuroLeague is not the only competition in which the team played during the season. He also coached in domestic competition, and regional competition if applicable.

=== EuroLeague ===
Team	Year	G	W	L	W–L%	Result
Cedevita	2015–16	10	4	6	.400	Eliminated in Top 16 stage
Career		10	4	6	.400	

== National team coaching ==
=== Croatia (2019–2022) ===
On 2 May 2019, the Croatian Basketball Federation announced Mršić was appointed head coach of the Croatian national basketball team.

Mršić debuted at Croatia bench at the 2019 NBA Summer League, while in July he celebrated winning the Stanković Cup title in China.

On 5 February 2020, Mršić published the roster for the 2022 EuroBasket qualifiers, bringing back two experienced players, Krunoslav Simon and Roko Ukić, on the national squad. On 21 and 24 February, Croatia opened qualifiers with two consecutive wins, against Sweden (72–56) and the Netherlands (69–59). On 29 November 2020, Croatia secured its place in the finals with an 87–72 victory over Sweden. On 20 January 2022, Mršić left his post as the national head coach.

== Awards and accomplishments ==
Club titles that Mršić won as a senior level player:

- Croatian League Champion:
  - 1993, 1994, 1995, 1998
- Lithuanian League Champion:
  - 1997
- Italian League Champion:
  - 1999
- FIBA Korać Cup Champion:
  - 2000–01
- Croatian Cup Winner:
  - 1995

Club titles that Mršić won as a head coach:

- Croatian League Champion: (with Cedevita: 2014–15, 2015–16, 2016–17; with Zadar: 2020–21)
- Croatian Cup Winner: (with Cedevita: 2015–16, 2016–17; with Zadar: 2020–21)
