= First Men's Basketball League =

2nd-tier men's professional basketball league

- Founded: 2017
- First season: 2017–18
- Country: Croatia
- Confederation: FIBA Europe
- Level on pyramid: 2nd
- Promotion to: Premijer liga
- Website: hks-cbf.hr

First Men's League (Croatian: Prva muška liga) is a second-tier professional men's basketball league in Croatia. The league was founded in 2017 replacing the former A2 Basketball League.

League champions are automatically promoted to Premijer Liga, while runners-up enter a promotion playoff against the next-to-last placed team from Premijer Liga.

== History ==
Season	Teams	Champions	Runners-up
2017–18	12	KK Gorica (Velika Gorica)	KK Bosco (Zagreb)
2018–19	12	KK Puntamika (Zadar)	KK Dubrava (Zagreb)
2019–20	Season canceled due to the COVID-19 pandemic.		
2020–21	12	KK Cedevita Junior (Zagreb)	KK Dinamo (Zagreb)
2021–22	12	KK Dinamo (Zagreb)	KK Bosco (Zagreb)
2022–23	12	KK Dubrovnik (Dubrovnik)	KK Kaštela (Kaštel Sućurac)
2023–24	14	KK Kvarner 2010 (Rijeka)	KK Vrijednosnice (Osijek)
2024–25	14	KK Samobor (Samobor)	HAKK Mladost (Zagreb)
2025–26	14	KK Škrljevo (Škrljevo)	KK Kaštela (Kaštela Sućurac)

== Current teams ==
The following is the list of 14 clubs for the 2024–25 season, scheduled to start in October 2024.

- KK Bosco
- KK Crikvenica
- KK Škrljevo
- KK Đakovo
- KK Gorica
- KK Hermes Analitica
- KK Jazine
- KK Marsonia
- HAKK Mladost
- KK Omiš
- KK Kaštela
- KK Samobor
- KK Puntamika
- KK Zagreb
