= Ivan Velić =

Bosnian basketball player and coach

Personal information
- Born: 19 October 1972 (age 54) Livno, SR Bosnia and Herzegovina, Yugoslavia

Career information
- NBA draft: 1994: undrafted
- Playing career: 1990–2002
- Position: Head coach
- Coaching career: 2004–present

Career history

Playing
- 1999–2002: Troglav Livno

Coaching
- 2004–2010: Široki (assistant)
- 2010–2013: Široki
- 2015: Jolly Šibenik
- 2015–2016: Krka
- 2016–2017: Jolly Šibenik
- 2018: Sloboda Tuzla
- 2018–2021: Cibona
- 2022–2025: Široki
- 2025–2026: Šibenka

Career highlights
- 3× Bosnian League champion (2010–2012); Croatian League champion (2019); 2× Bosnian Cup winner (2011, 2012)

Ivan Velić (born 19 October 1972) is a Bosnian professional basketball coach and former player, who most recently served as the head coach for Šibenka of the Croatian Basketball League.

== Coaching career ==
Velić spent most of his coaching career with Široki. He had two stints with Jolly Šibenik of the Croatian League, with whom, in the 2016–17 season, he finished in second place in the domestic cup, while the club also reached the play-offs of the national championship.

On 21 June 2015, Velić was hired by Krka to be their head coach. In 2018, Velić worked with Sloboda Tuzla as head coach.

On 8 June 2018, Velić was appointed the head coach of Croatian club Cibona. In June 2019, he celebrated winning the national championship with the club. On 1 April 2020, Cibona confirmed temporary termination of the contract with Velić due to the coronavirus outbreak in Croatia. On 31 January 2021, Velić and Cibona parted ways. In July 2022, Široki named Velić as their new head coach.

== National team coaching career ==
Velić served as the head coach in the past of both the Bosnia and Herzegovina national under-18 team, as well as the Croatia national under-20 team.

He was also assistant coach of the senior men's Bosnia and Herzegovina national team under the head coach Duško Ivanović. In September 2017, Velić joined coaching staff of the Croatian national team. He left the Croatian staff in 2018.
