= Damir Voloder =

Croatian basketball player and coach

Personal information
- Born: 20 November 1959 (age 66) Vukovar, PR Croatia, FPR Yugoslavia
- Listed height: 1.80 m (5 ft 11 in)

Career information
- Playing career: 1973–2003
- Position: Point guard

Career history

Playing
- 1973–1975: Vuteks
- 1975–1989: Borovo Vukovar
- 1989–1990: MZT Skopje
- 1990–1991: Kikinda
- 1991–1992: Split
- 1992–1997: Osijek
- 1997–1999: Telecomp Vinkovci
- 1999–2003: Osijek

Coaching
- Osijek
- 2007–2008: Vukovar
- 2008–2010: Vrijednosnice
- 2011–2012: ŽKK Mursa

Damir Voloder (born November 20, 1959) is a Croatian professional basketball coach and former player.
