= KK Bosco =

Croatian basketball club

Bosco
- Leagues: HT Premijer liga
- Founded: 1992; 29 years ago
- Arena: Boško Božić-Pepsi Sports Hall (Capacity: 2,500)
- Location: Zagreb, Croatia
- Team colors: Blue and White
- President: Ivan Marijanović
- Head coach: Matija Brkljačić
- Website: kkbosco.hr
Home	Away

Košarkaški klub Bosco (English: Bosco Basketball Club), commonly referred to as KK Bosco Zagreb, KK Bosco or simply Bosco, is a Croatian professional basketball club based in Zagreb, Croatia. The club competes in the HT Premijer liga.

== History ==
The club was founded in 1992. The club administration adopted the statute of the society on 12 January 2002. The founding assembly was held on 22 April 2002 and the City Office for General Affairs of the City of Zagreb approved the statute on 18 October the same year.

In April 2019, after one season playing in the first-tier HT Premijer liga, the club was relegated to the second tier Prva Muška Liga.

== Activities ==
The club practices volleyball, mini-table, table tennis, all merged into the Sports Association SALOM, which has organized the international games of the youths three times.

The club's sports hall is located at the Matija Gubec elementary school in the Knežija neighbourhood. Club selections have competed in various Croatian league championships.

The club has many professional basketball and junior league basketball players. To be mentioned are Ivan Velić (former Cibona head coach), Bariša Krasić (Cibona assistant coach), Dražen Dizdar (full professor at KIF), Damir Knjaz (full professor at KIF and formerly KIF Dean), Željko Birkić (Chief of the Zadar County Sports Committee), Vinko Batinić (director of HKK Široki) and Davor Bernardić (former president of the Social Democratic Party of Croatia), while some still play basketball at the top level: Andrija Stipanović, Mladen Primorac, Marin Pehar, Karlo Žganec, etc.

== Notable coaches ==
- (Croatia) Ivica Burić
