= KK Zagreb =

Zagreb
- Nickname: Mravi (The Ants)
- Founded: 1970
- Dissolved: 2018
- History: KK Siget (1970–1976); OKK Novi Zagreb (1976–1991); KK Zagreb (1991–2018)
- Arena: Boško Božić-Pepsi Hall (Capacity: 3,000); Dražen Petrović Basketball Hall (Capacity: 5,400)
- Location: Zagreb, Croatia
- Team colors: Yellow and Blue
- Championships: 1 Croatian Championship; 3 Croatian Cups
- Website: kk-zagreb.hr
Home	Away

Košarkaški klub Zagreb (English: Zagreb Basketball Club), commonly referred to as KK Zagreb or simply Zagreb, was a professional basketball club based in Zagreb, Croatia. It competed in the ABA League and the Croatian League. In the 2011–12 season, the club competed in the modern EuroLeague. Now the name KK Zagreb is holding previous club: KK Zapruđe.

== History ==
The club was founded in 1970 under the name KK Siget after the Siget neighbourhood in Zagreb. In 1976 it was renamed to KK Novi Zagreb to represent Novi Zagreb, part of Zagreb located south of the Sava river. After Croatia became independent country, "Novi" was just dropped out and the club name got its simpler and present form - KK Zagreb. From the beginnings Zagreb players were known under the nickname Ants as a symbol of hard work and team spirit.

Since its establishment KK Zagreb worked its way up over 19 years to join the famed first division in ex-Yugoslavia in 1989. Though it carries the name of a great basketball capital KK Zagreb had always lived a bit in the shadow of cross-town rival Cibona but since the beginning of the Croatian League in the early 1990s Zagreb has made a name of its own, becoming one of the better teams in the country. Until the late 2000s club was mainly known for its youth categories which won numerous Croatian and European titles, while senior team was always in the shadow of Croatian basketball Big Three - Cibona, Zadar and Split. In recent years, when its became a permanent member of the EuroChallenge Cup competition, the club increased its budget with an intention to make another step forward in its ambitious plans and won its first domestic trophies, the Croatian Cup in 2008 and 2010. It was only a matter of time, when the team will move from its traditional base in Trnsko school sports hall (capacity 3,000) to a bigger one, which happened in 2010, when they moved to Dražen Petrović Basketball Hall, home of their better known rival Cibona. Moving to a new and bigger hall proved to be some kind of "growing up" for KK Zagreb as the club won double title, winning both Championship of Croatia and Croatian Cup in 2011. Zagreb played in the 2011–12 Turkish Airlines Euroleague competition. In 2018 the club was dissolved.

A phoenix club was established in the same year.

== Season by season ==
Season	Tier	League	Pos.	W–L	Croatian Cup	European competitions		
2011–12	1	A-1 Liga	5th	6–8	Runner-up	1 Euroleague	RS	2–8
2012–13	1	A-1 Liga	7th	16–16	Quarterfinalist			
2013–14	1	A-1 Liga	5th	17–15	Runner-up			
2014–15	1	A-1 Liga	4th	22–14	Quarterfinalist			
2015–16	1	A-1 Liga	5th	24–10	Quarterfinalist			
2016–17	1	A-1 Liga	8th	12–16	Quarterfinalist			
2017–18	1	A-1 Liga	13th	4–20	Quarterfinalist			

== Honours ==
- Croatian Championship: 1
  - 2011
- Croatian Cup: 3
  - 2008, 2010, 2011

== Notable players ==
Note: Flags indicate national team eligibility at FIBA-sanctioned events. Players may hold other non-FIBA nationalities not displayed.

Criteria

To appear in this section a player must have either:

- Set a club record or won an individual award while at the club
- Played at least one official international match for their national team at any time
- Played at least one official NBA match at any time.

- (Croatia) Aleksandar Petrović
- (Croatia) Ivan Meheš
- (Croatia) Krunoslav Simon
- (Croatia) Mario Kasun
- (Croatia) Damir Mulaomerović
- (Croatia) Dario Šarić
- (Croatia) Josip Sesar
- (Croatia) Mario Stojić
- (Croatia) Marko Tomas
- (Croatia) Ante Tomić
- (Croatia) Luka Žorić
- (Croatia) Mario Hezonja
- (Croatia) Damir Milačić
- (Kosovo) (Croatia) Jan Palokaj
- (Slovenia) Sašo Ožbolt
- (United States) T. J. Ford
- (United States) Diante Garrett
- (United States) Sean May
- (United States) Alex Renfroe
- (United States) Mike James
- (United States) Josh Heytvelt
