= Gradski vrt Hall =

Sport venue in Osijek

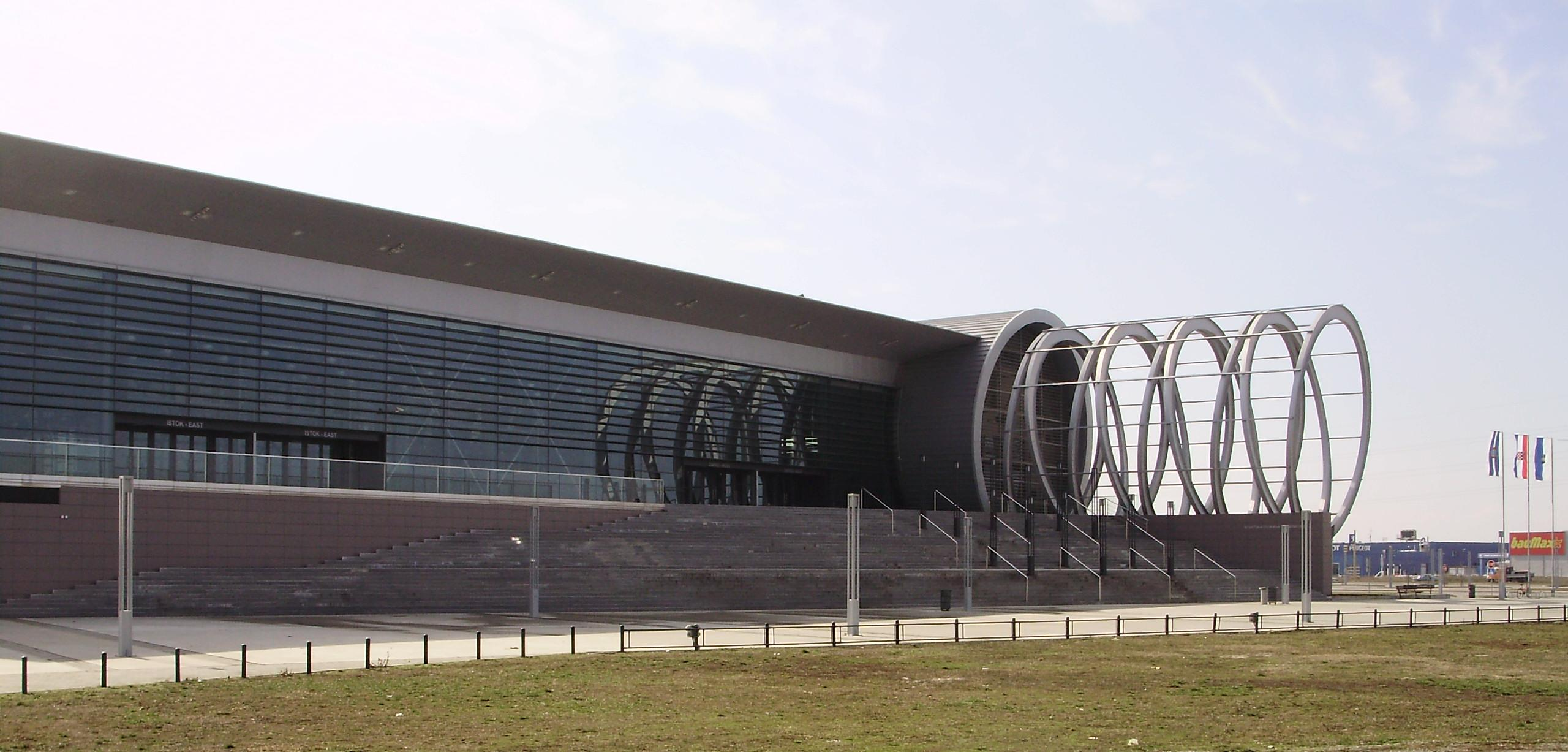
- Interactive map of Gradski vrt Hall
- Address: 23 Knez Trpimir Street
- Location: Osijek, Croatia
- Coordinates: 45°32′41″N 18°41′39″E
- Owner: City of Osijek
- Operator: Športski objekti d.d.
- Capacity: Hall A: 3,538 (4,438 basketball configuration); Hall B: 1,770; Halls C, D & F: each 200

Construction
- Groundbreaking: 11 October 2006
- Opened: 28 December 2008; 17 years ago
- Cost: € 30 million
- Architects: Gordana Domić, i.a. and Boris Koružnjak, d.i.a.

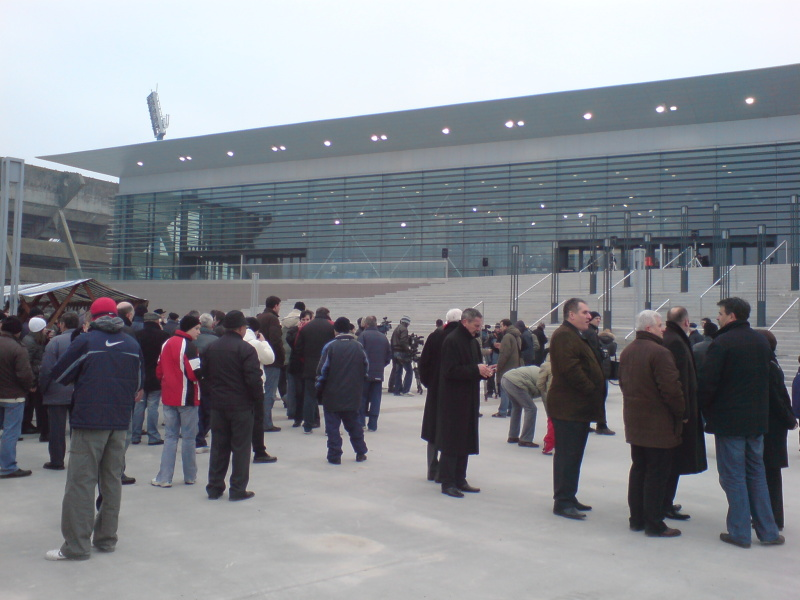
Gradski vrt Hall, opening day; 28 December 2008

Gradski vrt Hall is a multi-purpose indoor arena in Osijek, Croatia. The complex is used mostly for handball and basketball matches. The complex has 7 main halls, two of them with spectator seats, bigger one capacity of 3,538 (4,438 basketball configuration) and a smaller one 1,770, there are two more smaller halls for fighting sports training. The complex also contains the biggest indoor track and field compound in Croatia. It was also used as one of the venues during the 2009 World Men's Handball Championship. In 2017 the venue hosted the 2017 Davis Cup World Group first round between Croatia and Spain.

== Building levels ==
- Ground level – Level ± 0,00 (Halls A, C, D, G, H, saunas, swimming pool, locker rooms, sanitary facilities, sport medicine, shops, coffee bars, technical support, staff, etc.)
- 1st Level – Level +5,00 (Hall B, sport club premises, V.I.P., press, coffee shop, entrance hall, galleries, sanitary facilities etc.)
- 2nd Level – Level +9,00 (Track and field tunnel (F), technical support, staff, etc.)
- 3rd Level – Level +12,00 (Sport commentator gallery, TV, technical support)

The gross surface of entire complex is 18,590 m^{2}.

== Dimensions ==
- Big hall (A – 35x50 m)
- Smaller halls (C, D – 2 x 22x16 m)
- Gym (G – 10.25x9.6 m)
- Aerobic and fitness (H – 9.2x9.6 m) and saunas with a small swimming pool (18.5x10.6 m) locker rooms, sanitary facilities, sport medicine, doping control etc., are placed on the ground level ±0,00.
- Basketball hall (B – 30x32+10 m)
- Track and field tunnel (F – 87x16 m)

Except sport events this complex host all kind of entertainment, cultural and media events as well as expos.

== See also ==
- List of indoor arenas in Croatia
- List of indoor arenas in Europe
