= KK Hermes Analitica =

Hermes Analitica
- Nickname: Analitičari (The Analysts)
- Leagues: Croatian League
- Founded: 1997; 23 years ago
- Arena: Dražen Petrović Basketball Hall
- Capacity: 5,400
- Location: Zagreb, Croatia
- Team colors: Black and Red
- President: Ivan Svoboda
- Head coach: Božidar Bilafer

Košarkaški klub Hermes Analitica (English: Hermes Analitica Basketball Club), commonly referred to as KK Hermes Analitica or simply Hermes Analitica, is a men's professional basketball club based in Zagreb, Croatia. The club competes in the Croatian League.

The club is sponsored and was founded by the medical and pharmaceutical equipment company of the same name.
