= Arena Gripe =

Indoor arena in Croatia

Coordinates: 43°30′32.9″N 16°27′4″E

Gripe Sports Center
- Športski centar Gripe
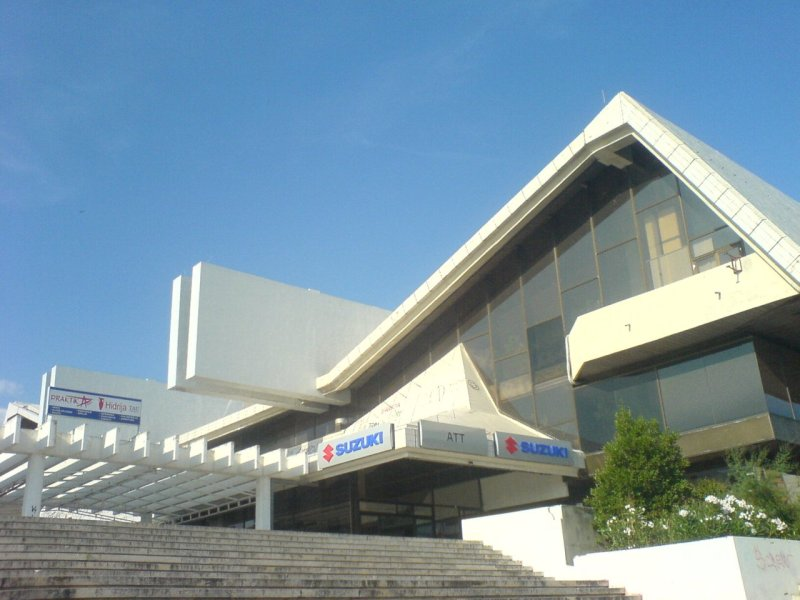
- Interactive map of Gripe Sports Center
- Location: Split, Croatia
- Owner: City of Split
- Capacity: Big hall: 6,000; Small hall: 3,500
- Surface: Hardwood

Construction
- Opened: 1979; 47 years ago
- Architects: Živorad Janković; Slaven Rožić

Tenants
- KK Split; Split Tommy

Gripe Sports Center (Croatian: Športski centar Gripe) is a sports complex located in the Gripe city district of Split, Croatia. It features four indoor halls hosting many sports events and concerts. The seating capacity of the small indoor hall is 3,500, and of the biggest one is 6,000.

== History ==
The sports complex was built in the late 1970s, for the 1979 Mediterranean Games. The sports complex has been used as the home venues of the KK Split basketball team, and the MNK Split Tommy futsal team.

== Structure ==
Two night clubs are incorporated into the center, as well as numerous shops, coffeehouses, and restaurants.

== See also ==
- List of indoor arenas in Croatia
- List of indoor arenas in Europe
