= KK Vrijednosnice Osijek =

Basketball club in Osijek, Croatia

Vrijednosnice Osijek
- Nickname: Brokeri (The Brokers)
- Leagues: HT Premijer liga
- Founded: 1980; 45 years ago
- History: 1980–present
- Arena: Gradski vrt Hall
- Capacity: 4,448
- Location: Osijek, Croatia
- Team colors: Yellow and Blue
- President: Alexander Hrkač
- Head coach: Marko Mandić
- Website: kkvrijednosniceosijek.hr
Home	Away

Košarkaški klub Vrijednosnice Osijek (transl. Vrijednosnice Osijek Basketball Club), commonly referred to as KK Vrijednosnice Osijek, is a men's professional basketball club based in Osijek, Croatia. They are currently competing in the HT Premijer liga.

Founded in the village of Darda as KK Darda in 1980, club was relocated to Osijek in the summer of 2014. The club's second team remained in Darda and competes in Croatian second basketball league under the name KK Vrijednosnice Osijek Darda.

== Name changes ==
- OKK Darda: 1980–1991
- Inactive due to the Croatian War of Independence: 1991–1998
- ŠKK Darda: 1998–2004
- KK Darda: 2004–2006
- KK Vrijednosnice Osijek Darda: 2006–2014
- KK Vrijednosnice Osijek: 2014–present

== Players ==
=== Current roster ===
Note: Flags indicate national team eligibility at FIBA-sanctioned events. Players may hold other non-FIBA nationalities not displayed.

KK Vrijednosnice Osijek roster
Players
Coaches

Pos.	No.	Nat.	Name	Ht.	Age
PG	1	(South Sudan)	Makoi, Anyiarbany	1.93 m (6 ft 4 in)	25 – 3 July 2000
G	4	(Croatia)	Lisica, Šime Lovre	1.90 m (6 ft 3 in)	26 – 25 August 1998
PG	5	(Croatia)	Flanjak, Gabrijel	1.89 m (6 ft 2 in)	20 – 26 March 2005
PG	6	(Croatia)	Filipović, Franco	1.86 m (6 ft 1 in)	24 – 7 April 2001
SF	8	(Croatia)	Tomljenović, Tadej	1.92 m (6 ft 4 in)	23 – 13 February 2002
PF	9	(Croatia)	Tokić, Matej	2.04 m (6 ft 8 in)	22 – 24 November 2002
SG	10	(Croatia)	Špehar, Luka	1.95 m (6 ft 5 in)	24 – 9 February 2001
G/F	11	(Croatia)	Porobić, Vito	1.98 m (6 ft 6 in)	24 – 24 April 2001
SF	12	(South Sudan)	Kuany, Kuany	2.00 m (6 ft 7 in)	31 – 8 July 1994
SF	13	(Bosnia and Herzegovina)	Bošnjak, Marko	1.98 m (6 ft 6 in)	25 – 12 February 2000
C	14	(Bosnia and Herzegovina)	Simanić, Stefan	2.07 m (6 ft 9 in)	23 – 2 August 2001
C	15	(Bosnia and Herzegovina)	Topolović, Đorđe	2.08 m (6 ft 10 in)	24 – 7 July 2001
G	19	(Croatia)	Jurić, Marin	1.92 m (6 ft 4 in)	22 – 26 February 2003

Head coach

- (Croatia) Marko Mandić

Assistant coach(es)

- (Croatia) Nedjeljko Matić

Legend

- (C) Team captain
- Injured

- Roster
Updated: December 31, 2021

== Head coaches ==
- (Croatia) Renato Martinko (2006–2007)
- (Croatia) Damir Voloder (2008–2010)
- (Serbia) Dejan Srzić (2010–2011)
- (Bosnia and Herzegovina) Senad Muminović (2011–2014)
- (Croatia) Vladimir Krstić (2014–2019)
- (Croatia) Domagoj Kujundžić (2019–2020)
- (Croatia) Stipe Šarlija (2020–2021)
- (Croatia) Marko Mandić (2021–present)
