= KK Dubrava =

Dubrava
- Leagues: Premijer liga
- Founded: 22 April 1976; 50 years ago
- History: KK Benston Zagreb (1993–2000); KK Dona (2000–2001); KK Dubrava (2001–2019); KK Dubrava Furnir (2019–2020); KK Furnir (2020–present); KK Dubrava
- Arena: Dubrava Sports Hall
- Capacity: 2,000
- Location: Zagreb, Croatia
- Head coach: Tihomir Bujan
- Website: Club website

Košarkaški klub Dubrava (English: Dubrava Basketball Club), commonly referred to as KK Dubrava or simply Dubrava, is a men's professional basketball club based in Dubrava, Zagreb, Croatia.

== History ==
The club was founded on 22 April 1976. It advanced into the first Croatian basketball league between 1986 and 1989, which was at the time a second-tier league under the Yugoslav Basketball League. In 1993 they advanced to the A-1 Liga, the first-tier league of the Republic of Croatia, under the name Benston, when their primary sponsor was the tobacco factory Tvornica Duhana Zagreb. In 1996, they entered a European competition for the first time.

At the start of the 2000–01 season, they changed their name to KK Dona, again for sponsorship reasons. In the 2005–06 season they were relegated from the A-1 to the A-2 Liga but returned the following season.

== Honours ==
- Croatian A2-second tier (3): 1992 (C Group), 1992-93 (Central division), 2005-06 (Central division)

== Season by season ==
Season	Tier	Division	Pos.	Croatian Cup	European competitions		
2025–26	1	Premijer liga	7th	Eigthfinal	R European North Basketball League	R16	4-5
