= KK Škrljevo =

Croatian basketball team

KK DepoLink Škrljevo
- Leagues: Croatian League
- Founded: 1973; 52 years ago
- History: 1973–present
- Arena: Dvorana Kostrena
- Location: Škrljevo, Croatia
- Team colors: White and Green
- President: Vice Sep
- Head coach: Petar Maleš
- Website: Club website
Home	Away

Košarkaški klub Škrljevo (English: Škrljevo Basketball Club) or simply Škrljevo, also known as DepoLink Škrljevo due to sponsorship reasons, is a men's professional basketball club based in the village of Škrljevo, Croatia, but plays its games in nearby municipality of Čavle.

== Players ==
=== Current roster ===
Note: Flags indicate national team eligibility at FIBA-sanctioned events. Players may hold other non-FIBA nationalities not displayed.

KK DepoLink Škrljevo roster
Players
Coaches

Pos.	No.	Nat.	Name
F	0	(Croatia)	Ivan Gulin
F	4	(Croatia)	Martin Jelic
G	6	(Croatia)	Vigo Bart
SF	7	(Croatia)	Robert Kujundzic
G	8	(United States)	Derryck Thornton
G/F	9	(Croatia)	Mario Rajcic
C	10	(Croatia)	Sandro Antunovic
G	11	(United States)	Griffin Ramme
G	12	(Croatia)	Vito Smojver
G	13	(Croatia)	Frane Butorac
G	14	(Croatia)	Jakov Rajkovic
C	15	(Croatia)	Viktor Saric
C	16	(Croatia)	Luka Cosic
F/C	40	(Croatia)	Luka Barišić
G	44	(Croatia)	Noa Svoboda

Head coach

(Croatia) Petar Maleš

Legend

- (C) Team captain
- Injured

- Roster
Updated: 21 March 2023
