= Premijer liga (Croatian basketball) =

Croatian basketball league

Super Sport Premijer liga
- Founded: 1991; 35 years ago
- Country: Croatia
- Confederation: FIBA Europe
- Number of teams: 12
- Level on pyramid: 1
- Relegation to: Prva muška liga
- Domestic cup: Krešimir Ćosić Cup
- Current champions: Cibona (21st title) (2025–26 season)
- Most championships: Cibona (21 titles)
- Website: www.hks-cbf.hr

The Super Sport Premijer liga (English: Super Sport Premier League, lit. 'Super Sport Premier League'), also known as simply Premijer liga, is the first tier level men's professional basketball league in Croatia. It began in 1991, following the breakup of SFR Yugoslavia and therefore the Yugoslav League, and is organized by the Croatian Basketball Federation.

Favbet Premijer liga, which is played under FIBA rules, currently consists of 12 teams. The most successful club is KK Cibona with 19 championship titles.

== History ==
Prior to 1991, clubs from Croatia played in the Yugoslav First Federal League. From the inaugural season in 1946, three Croatian clubs won 15 national championships in total; Zadar (six titles), Split (six titles), and Cibona (three titles).

== Logos, names, and sponsorship names ==
- 1991–2009A-1 Liga
- 2004–2005A-1 Ožujsko Liga
- 2005–2017A-1 Liga
- 2017–2023Hrvatski Telekom Premijer Liga
- 2023–2025Favbet Premijer Liga
- 2025–presentSuperSport Premijer Liga

== Title holders ==
- 1991–92: Cibona
- 1992–93: Cibona (2)
- 1993–94: Cibona (3)
- 1994–95: Cibona (4)
- 1995–96: Cibona (5)
- 1996–97: Cibona (6)
- 1997–98: Cibona (7)
- 1998–99: Cibona (8)
- 1999–00: Cibona (9)
- 2000–01: Cibona (10)
- 2001–02: Cibona VIP (11)
- 2002–03: Split CO
- 2003–04: Cibona VIP (12)
- 2004–05: Zadar
- 2005–06: Cibona VIP (13)
- 2006–07: Cibona VIP (14)
- 2007–08: Zadar (2)
- 2008–09: Cibona VIP (15)
- 2009–10: Cibona VIP (16)
- 2010–11: Zagreb CO
- 2011–12: Cibona (17)
- 2012–13: Cibona (18)
- 2013–14: Cedevita
- 2014–15: Cedevita (2)
- 2015–16: Cedevita (3)
- 2016–17: Cedevita (4)
- 2017–18: Cedevita (5)
- 2018–19: Cibona (19)
- 2019–20: Season canceled due to COVID-19 pandemic
- 2020–21: Zadar (3)
- 2021–22: Cibona (20)
- 2022–23: Zadar (4)
- 2023–24: Zadar (5)
- 2024–25: Zadar (6)
- 2025–26: Cibona (21)

== Performance by club ==
| Club | Champions | Winning years |
|---|---|---|
| Cibona | 21 | 1991–92, 1992–93, 1993–94, 1994–95, 1995–96, 1996–97, 1997–98, 1998–99, 1999–00, 2000–01, 2001–02, 2003–04, 2005–06, 2006–07, 2008–09, 2009–10, 2011–12, 2012–13, 2018–19, 2021–22, 2025–26 |
| Zadar | 6 | 2004–05, 2007–08, 2020–21, 2022–23, 2023–24, 2024–25 |
| Cedevita | 5 | 2013–14, 2014–15, 2015–16, 2016–17, 2017–18 |
| Split | 1 | 2002–03 |
| Zagreb | 1 | 2010–11 |

== Playoffs finals ==
Winners in matches between first & fourth and second & third in regular season play against each other for the title

| Season | Home court advantage | Result | Home court disadvantage | 1st of Regular Season | Record |
|---|---|---|---|---|---|
| 1991–92 | Cibona | 2–1 | Zadar | Cibona | 8–2 |
| 1992–93 | Cibona | 2–1 | Slobodna Dalmacija | Cibona (2) | 17–1 |
| 1993–94 | Cibona | 3–0 | Croatia Osiguranje | Cibona (3) | 14–0 |
| 1994–95 | Cibona | 3–1 | Zrinjevac | Cibona (4) | 12–2 |
| 1995–96 | Cibona | 3–1 | Croatia Osiguranje | Cibona (5) | 25–3 |
| 1996–97 | Cibona | 3–1 | Croatia Osiguranje | Cibona (6) | 19–3 |
| 1997–98 | Cibona | 3–1 | Zadar | Cibona (7) | 24–2 |
| 1998–99 | Zadar | 1–3 | Cibona | Zadar | 19–3 |
| 1999–00 | Zadar | 0–2 | Cibona | Zadar (2) | 20–2 |
| 2000–01 | Cibona | 3–0 | Split CO | Cibona (8) | 18–4 |
| 2001–02 | Cibona VIP | 2–0 | Zadar | Cibona VIP (9) | 12–2 |
| 2002–03 | Split CO | 2–0 | Cibona VIP | Split CO | 12–2 |
| 2003–04 | Cibona VIP | 3–1 | Zadar | Cibona VIP (10) | 13–1 |
| 2004–05 | Zadar | 3–2 | Cibona VIP | Zadar (3) | 12–2 |
| 2005–06 | Cibona VIP | 2–1 | Zadar | Cibona VIP (11) | 14–0 |
| 2006–07 | Cibona VIP | 3–2 | Zadar | Cibona VIP (12) | 12–2 |
| 2007–08 | Zadar | 3–2 | Split CO | Zadar (4) | 13–1 |
| 2008–09 | Cibona VIP | 3–1 | Zadar | Cibona VIP (13) | 13–1 |
| 2009–10 | Cibona VIP | 3–2 | Zadar | Cibona VIP (14) | 12–2 |
| 2010–11 | Cedevita | 0–3 | Zagreb CO | Cedevita | 12–2 |
| 2011–12 | Cibona | 3–1 | Cedevita | Cibona (15) | 14–0 |
| 2012–13 | Cibona | 3–0 | Zadar | Cibona (16) | 12–2 |
| 2013–14 | Cedevita | 3–0 | Cibona | Cedevita (2) | 13–1 |
| 2014–15 | Cedevita | 3–1 | Cibona | Cedevita (3) | 12–2 |
| 2015–16 | Cedevita | 3–0 | Cibona | Cedevita (4) | 13–1 |
| 2016–17 | Cibona | 2–3 | Cedevita | Šibenik | 21–5 |
| 2017–18 | Cedevita | 3–1 | Cibona | Cedevita (5) | 23–1 |
| 2018–19 | Cibona | 4–0 | Cedevita | Zadar (5) | 18–4 |
| 2019–20 | Season canceled due to the COVID-19 pandemic | | | | |
| 2020–21 | Zadar | 3–2 | Split | Zadar (6) | 29–4 |
| 2021–22 | Cibona | 3–2 | Zadar | Cibona (17) | 25–7 |
| 2022–23 | Split | 0–3 | Zadar | Split (2) | 26–6 |
| 2023–24 | Zadar | 3–2 | Split | Zadar (7) | 31–2 |
| 2024–25 | Zadar | 3–1 | Split | Zadar (8) | 30–3 |
| 2025–26 | Zadar | 2–3 | Cibona | Zadar (9) | 29–4 |

=== By club ===
| Club | W | L | Total |
|---|---|---|---|
| Cibona | 21 | 7 | 28 |
| Zadar | 6 | 13 | 19 |
| Cedevita | 5 | 3 | 8 |
| Split | 1 | 10 | 11 |
| Zagreb | 1 | 0 | 1 |
| Zrinjevac | 0 | 1 | 1 |

== All–time national champions ==
Total number of national champions won by Croatian clubs. Table includes titles won during the Yugoslav First Federal League (1945–1992).

| Club | Champions | Winning years |
|---|---|---|
| Cibona | 24 | 1981–82, 1983–84, 1984–85, 1991–92, 1992–93, 1993–94, 1994–95, 1995–96, 1996–97, 1997–98, 1998–99, 1999–00, 2000–01, 2001–02, 2003–04, 2005–06, 2006–07, 2008–09, 2009–10, 2011–12, 2012–13, 2018–19, 2021–22, 2025–26 |
| Zadar | 12 | 1965, 1967, 1967–68, 1973–74, 1974–75, 1985–86, 2004–05, 2007–08, 2020–21, 2022–23, 2023–24, 2024–25 |
| Split | 7 | 1970–71, 1976–77, 1987–88, 1988–89, 1989–90, 1990–91, 2002–03 |
| Cedevita | 5 | 2013–14, 2014–15, 2015–16, 2016–17, 2017–18 |
| Zagreb | 1 | 2010–11 |

== Topscorers ==
| Year | Player | Team | PPG |
|---|---|---|---|
| 1996-97 | (Croatia) Josip Sesar | KK Zagreb | 21.5 |
| 1997-98 | | | |
| 1998-99 | (Croatia) Josip Sesar (2) | KK Zagreb | 22.9 |
| 1999-00 | (Croatia) Marko Bulic | Karlovac | 25.3 |
| 2000-01 | (Croatia) Jan Zemljic | GKK Šibenka | 30.8 |
| 2001-02 | (Croatia) Marino Baždarić | KK Kvarner | 26.6 |
| 2002-03 | (Croatia) Marko Popović | KK Zadar | 24.2 |
| 2003-04 | (Croatia) Neven Cuzela | KK Istra | 19.9 |
| 2004-05 | (Croatia) Roko Ukić | KK Split | 23.5 |
| 2005-06 | (Croatia) Roko Ukić (2) | KK Split | 23.5 |
| 2006-07 | (Puerto Rico) Larry Ayuso | KK Split | 28.2 |
| 2007-08 | (Croatia) Marko Car | KK Osijek 2006 | 21.3 |
| 2008-09 | (Croatia) Toni Bizaca | Trogir ZP | 22.4 |
| 2009-10 | (Croatia) Toni Bizaca (2) | Trogir ZP | 21.0 |
| 2010-11 | (Croatia) Hrvoje Puljko | KK Kvarner | 23.0 |
| 2011-12 | (Croatia) Ivan Mimica | KK Split | 18.8 |
| 2012-13 | (United States) Ronald Ross | Jolly JBŠ | 20.6 |
| 2013-14 | (Croatia) Dario Saric | KK Cibona | 19.3 |
| 2014-15 | (Croatia) Filip Tončinić | KK Osijek 2006 | 20.8 |
| 2015-16 | (United States) James Florence | KK Cibona | 18.7 |
| 2016-17 | (United States) Brandon Johnson | KK Alkar | 22.3 |
| 2017-18 | (United States) Steven Gray | KK Zadar | 19.8 |
| 2018-19 | (Croatia) Hrvoje Vucic | KK Alkar | 17.6 |
| 2019-20 | (Croatia) Antonio Jordano | KK Osijek 2006 | 18.9 |
| 2020-21 | (Montenegro) Milija Miković | GKK Šibenka | 19.4 |
| 2021-22 | (United States) Patrick McGlynn | KK Alkar | 20.4 |
| 2022-23 | (United States) Derryck Thornton | KK Škrljevo | 20.6 |
| 2023-24 | (Croatia) Filip Vujicic | KK Dubrovnik | 16.7 |
| 2024-25 | (Montenegro) Vladimir Mihailović | KK Zadar | 17.4 |
| 2025-26 | (Croatia) Luka Krajnović | KK Samobor | 17.3 |

Source: eurobasket.com

=== Players with most topscorer awards ===
| Player | Wins | Years |
|---|---|---|
| (Croatia) Toni Bizaca | 2 | 2009, 2010 |
| (Croatia) Roko Ukić | 2 | 2005, 2006 |
| (Croatia) Josip Sesar | 2 | 1997, 1999 |

== Awards ==
=== MVP ===
| Year | Player | Team |
|---|---|---|
| 1996-97 | (Croatia) Josip Sesar | KK Zagreb |
| 1999-00 | (Croatia) Dino Radja (Croatian) (United States) Marcus Norris (Foreigner) | KK Zadar; KK Slavonski Brod |
| 2000-01 | (Croatia) Marijan Mance | KK Cibona |
| 2001-02 | (Croatia) Nikola Prkačin | KK Cibona |

=== Most Improved player ===
| Year | Player | Team |
|---|---|---|
| 1999-00 | (Croatia) Dalibor Bagarić | Benston Zagreb |

=== Best defender ===
| Year | Player | Team |
|---|---|---|
| 1999-00 | (Croatia) Davor Marcelić | KK Cibona |

== Players with 3 or more trophies ==
| Championships | Player |
|---|---|
| 8 | (Croatia) Davor Kus |
| 8 | (Croatia) Davor Marcelić |
| 7 | (Croatia) Marin Rozić |
| 7 | (Croatia) Karlo Žganec |
| 6 | (Bosnia and Herzegovina) Dževad Alihodžić |
| 6 | (Croatia) Marko Arapović |
| 6 | (Croatia) Lovro Mazalin |
| 6 | (Croatia) Veljko Mršić |
| 6 | (Croatia) Davor Pejčinović |
| 6 | (Croatia) Slaven Rimac |
| 6 | (Croatia) Ivica Žurić |
| 5 | (Croatia) Vladan Alanović |
| 5 | (Croatia) Damir Mulaomerović |
| 5 | (Croatia) Sandro Nicević |
| 5 | (Croatia) Nikola Prkačin |
| 5 | (Croatia) Josip Sesar |
| 5 | (Croatia) Tomislav Zubčić |
| 4 | (Croatia) Lukša Andrić |
| 4 | (Croatia) Luka Babić |
| 4 | (Croatia) Miro Bilan |
| 4 | (Croatia) Gordan Giriček |
| 4 | (Croatia) Alan Gregov |
| 4 | (Croatia) Marko Ramljak |
| 4 | (Croatia) Mate Skelin |
| 4 | (Croatia) Marko Tomas |
| 4 | (Croatia) Andrija Žižić |
| 3 | (Croatia) Ivan Grgat |
| 3 | (Croatia) Toni Katić |
| 3 | (Bosnia and Herzegovina) Bariša Krasić |
| 3 | (Croatia) Marijan Mance |
| 3 | (Croatia) Pavle Marčinković |
| 3 | (Croatia) Damir Markota |
| 3 | (Bosnia and Herzegovina) Džanan Musa |
| 3 | (Croatia) Fran Pilepić |
| 3 | (Croatia) Zdravko Radulović |
| 3 | (Croatia) Ivan Ramljak |
| 3 | (Croatia) Damir Rančić |
| 3 | (Croatia) Marko Šamanić |
| 3 | (Croatia) Roko Ukić |
| 3 | (Croatia) Josip Vranković |

Source: basketball.hr

== Coaches with 2 or more trophies ==
| Championships | Coach |
|---|---|
| 6 | (Croatia) Aleksandar Petrović |
| 6 | (Croatia) Jasmin Repeša |
| 4 | (Croatia) Veljko Mršić |
| 3 | (Croatia) Dražen Anzulović |
| 3 | (Croatia) Danijel Jusup |
| 2 | (Croatia) Velimir Perasović |
| 2 | (Croatia) Neven Spahija |

Source: basketball.hr

== See also ==
- Krešimir Ćosić Cup
- Croatian First Women's Basketball League
- Croatian Basketball All-Star Game
