= KK Gorica =

Basketball club in Velika Gorica, Croatia

- Leagues: ABA League Second Division; Croatian League
- Founded: 1969; 56 years ago
- History: Gorički OKK (1969–1970); KK Radnik (1970–1992); KK Media (1992–1997); KK Gorica (1997–present)
- Arena: Velika Gorica City Sports Hall
- Capacity: 620
- Location: Velika Gorica, Croatia
- Team colors: Red, Black, White
- President: Duško Radović
- Website: kkgorica.hr

Košarkaški klub Gorica (transl. Gorica Basketball Club), commonly referred to as KK Gorica or simply Gorica, is a men's professional basketball club based in Velika Gorica, Croatia. The club competes in the ABA League Second Division and the Croatian League.

== History ==
The club's greatest success so far came when they got promoted to the Croatian League after winning the 2nd-tier league in 2014.

== Players ==
=== Current roster ===
Note: Flags indicate national team eligibility at FIBA-sanctioned events. Players may hold other non-FIBA nationalities not displayed.

Gorica roster
Players
Coaches

Pos.	No.	Nat.	Name	Ht.	Age
SF	8	(Bosnia and Herzegovina)	Mašić, Ante	2.00 m (6 ft 7 in)	39 – 28 October 1985
SG	9	(Croatia)	Savić, Emil	2.00 m (6 ft 7 in)	27 – 26 March 1998
F	11	(Croatia)	Batur, Ivan	2.03 m (6 ft 8 in)	33 – 4 July 1991
G	15	(Croatia)	Uljarević, Karlo	1.88 m (6 ft 2 in)	26 – 20 November 1998
PF	24	(Croatia)	Baković, Marko	2.05 m (6 ft 9 in)	32 – 22 February 1993
SG	–	(Croatia)	Majić, Ivan Tvrtko	1.94 m (6 ft 4 in)	27 – 29 January 1998
SF	–	(Croatia)	Cvitković, Tomislav	2.06 m (6 ft 9 in)	26 – 19 May 1998

Head coach

- (Croatia) Vladimir Krstić

Legend

- (C) Team captain
- Injured

- Roster
Updated: August 6, 2022

== Trophies ==
- First Men's Basketball League (1): 2017-18

== Notable former players ==
- (Croatia) Mario Kasun
- (Croatia) Robert Troha
- (Croatia) Ivica Zubac
- (Croatia) Ante Žižić
