= KK Zabok =

Professional basketball club from Zabok, Croatia

- Leagues: Croatian League
- Founded: 1977
- History: 1977–present
- Arena: Sportska dvorana Zabok
- Capacity: 3,000
- Location: Zabok, Croatia
- Team colors: Blue and Yellow
- President: Goran Tomek
- Head coach: Ivan Tomas
- Website: kkzabok.hr
Home	Away

Košarkaški klub Zabok (English: Zabok Basketball Club) is a professional basketball club based in Zabok, Croatia. It competes in the Croatian League.

== History ==
The club was founded in 1977 under the name KK Ivo Lola Ribar after the World War II partisan hero. In 1981 club changed its name to the present one, KK Zabok.
