= 2015–16 A-1 League =

A-1 League
- Season: 2015–16
- Duration: October 3, 2015 – June 3, 2016
- Teams: 11 + 3
- TV partner(s): HRT

Regular season
- Top seed: Cedevita
- Promoted: Hermes Analitica
- Relegated: Ribola Kaštela

Finals
- Champions: Cedevita
- Runners-up: Cibona
- Semifinalists: Kvarner; Zadar

Statistical leaders
Points	(United States) James Florence (Cibona)	18.7
Rebounds	(Croatia) Kristijan Krajina (Šibenik)	10.4
Assists	(Croatia) Teo Petani (Šibenik)	7.0
- All statistics correct as of 26 March 2016.

The 2015–16 A-1 League (Croatian: A-1 liga 2015./16.) was the 25th season of the A-1 League, the highest professional basketball league in Croatia.

The first half of the season consists of 11 teams and 110-game regular season. For second half of the season clubs will be divided into two groups. Championship group will consist of 3 teams from ABA League and the best 5 teams from first half of the season. Relegation group will consist of bottom 6 teams from first half of the season.

== Teams and venues ==
- Promoted from A-2 Liga
  - Škrljevo (Champion)

	Teams	Team	City	Venue (Capacity)
Regular season teams	11			
Regular season teams	11	Alkar	Sinj	Športska dvorana Sinj (1,500)
Regular season teams	11	Gorica	Velika Gorica	Gradska sportska dvorana Velika Gorica (300)
Regular season teams	11	Jolly Jadranska banka Šibenik	Šibenik	Sportska dvorana Baldekin (1,500)
Regular season teams	11	Kvarner 2010	Rijeka	Dvorana Dinko Lukarić (1,100)
Regular season teams	11	Ribola Kaštela	Kaštela	Školska sportska dvorana Kaštel Sućurac (1,600)
Regular season teams	11	Split	Split	Arena Gripe (6,000)
Regular season teams	11	Škrljevo	Čavle	Dvorana Mavrinci (720)
Regular season teams	11	Šibenik	Šibenik	Sportska dvorana Baldekin (1,500)
Regular season teams	11	Vrijednosnice Osijek	Osijek	Gradski vrt Hall (1,448)
Regular season teams	11	Zabok	Zabok	Športska dvorana Bedekovčina (2,500)
Regular season teams	11	Zagreb	Zagreb	Športska dvorana Trnsko (2,500)
Teams already qualified for Championship Round	3			
Teams already qualified for Championship Round	3	Cedevita	Zagreb	Dom Sportova (3,100)
Teams already qualified for Championship Round	3	Cibona	Zagreb	Dražen Petrović Basketball Hall (5,400)
Teams already qualified for Championship Round	3	Zadar	Zadar	Krešimir Ćosić Hall (8,500)

Location of teams in the A-1 League 2013–14

== Regular season ==
Pos	Team	Pld	W	L	PF	PA	PD	Pts	Qualification
1	Zagreb	20	17	3	1717	1460	+257	37	Championship round
2	Kvarner 2010	20	14	6	1652	1564	+88	34	Championship round
3	Split	20	13	7	1569	1492	+77	33	Championship round
4	Šibenik	20	11	9	1548	1570	−22	31	Championship round
5	Gorica	20	10	10	1605	1580	+25	30	Championship round
6	Škrljevo	20	10	10	1573	1585	−12	30	Relegation round
7	Zabok	20	9	11	1401	1405	−4	29	Relegation round
8	Jolly JBŠ	20	8	12	1499	1532	−33	28	Relegation round
9	Alkar	20	8	12	1458	1537	−79	28	Relegation round
10	Vrijednosnice Osijek	20	7	13	1424	1490	−66	27	Relegation round
11	Ribola Kaštela	20	3	17	1488	1719	−231	23	Relegation round

Source: Crosarka.com and Scoresway.com

=== Results ===
Home \ Away	ALK	GOR	JOL	KVA	KŠT	SPL	ŠKR	ŠIB	VRO	ZAB	ZAG
ALK		64–67	70–65	74–88	75–73	78–62	63–59	68–70	77–68	69–61	79–92
GOR	95–74		93–84	70–94	98–66	78–80	85–79	93–84	107–103	78–71	82–75
JOL	85–78	78–70		70–66	72–82	67–69	77–66	74–79	65–61	83–64	77–84
KVA	104–87	81–77	78–67		97–69	91–93	89–95	73–69	88–74	76–83	69–99
KŠT	86–88	72–99	83–73	81–91		77–84	72–74	63–69	89–80	61–83	64–92
SPL	81–67	86–61	97–79	73–75	96–83		70–77	97–79	69–61	85–69	74–59
ŠKR	93–81	78–74	94–96	89–92	86–78	75–63		85–68	84–77	87–68	71–92
ŠIB	72–60	87–81	70–83	76–80	106–82	79–77	90–79		70–65	80–62	82–89
VRO	69–63	59–67	81–77	62–68	82–76	70–64	80–67	90–66		58–54	64–67
ZAB	79–66	79–66	60–58	64–74	70–53	77–79	72–63	79–71	71–50		69–74
ZAG	68–77	85–73	87–69	92–84	104–78	89–67	98–72	96–76	101–70	74–69	

Legend: Blue = home team win; Yellow = draw; Red = away team win.

Source: Scoresway.com

== Championship round ==
Pos	Team	Pld	W	L	PF	PA	PD	Pts	Qualification	CED	CIB	ZD	KVA	ZAG	SPL	GOR	ŠIB
1	Cedevita	14	13	1	1330	978	+352	27	Clinched Playoffs berth		83–77	109–70	107–60	116–79	109–83	100–56	104–53
2	Cibona	14	11	3	1239	1072	+167	25	Clinched Playoffs berth	81–76		76–65	89–88	107–88	78–79	78–65	99–66
3	Zadar	14	8	6	1132	1062	+70	22	Clinched Playoffs berth	57–67	83–82		81–66	104–87	90–49	68–70	108–69
4	Kvarner	14	7	7	1119	1139	−20	21	Clinched Playoffs berth	85–97	73–89	86–67		89–76	47–69	88–78	84–77
5	Zagreb	14	7	7	1117	1180	−63	21		64–85	95–101	75–68	83–79		75–72	91–71	82–68
6	Split	14	5	9	1012	1070	−58	19		58–67	69–96	78–90	73–79	68–50		75–56	78–65
7	Gorica	14	4	10	1043	1182	−139	18		91–96	71–94	79–86	80–91	66–82	78–77		99–91
8	Šibenik	14	1	13	1007	1316	−309	15		64–114	71–92	69–95	73–104	86–90	90–84	65–83	

Source: Scoresway.com

== Relegation and promotion rounds ==
=== Relegation round ===
Teams "carried" the results of the matches played between them from the regular season.

Pos	Team	Pld	W	L	PF	PA	PD	Pts	Qualification or relegation	ALK	ZAB	VRO	JOL	ŠKR	KŠT
1	Alkar	20	12	8	1450	1438	+12	32			70–55	85–59	75–68	73–75	81–79
2	Zabok	20	11	9	1397	1317	+80	31		58–65		66–59	75–79	92–88	89–46
3	Vrijednosnice Osijek	20	11	9	1399	1433	−34	31		61–49	65–58		81–67	80–69	87–78
4	Jolly JBŠ	20	11	9	1476	1454	+22	31		27–10	51–62	73–66		82–73	73–64
5	Škrljevo	20	10	10	1585	1562	+23	30	Relegation/Promotion Play off	78–74	91–73	97–63	81–85		90–85
6	Ribola Kaštela	20	5	15	1504	1607	−103	25	Relegated	91–104	55–87	68–72	94–71	91–70	

=== Promotion round ===
Pos	Team	Pld	W	L	PF	PA	PD	Pts	Promotion or qualification	HER	JAZ	STO	BOR	MEĐ
1	Hermes Analitica	8	8	0	782	614	+168	16	Promotion		84–78	98–71	103–73	105–76
2	Jazine	8	5	3	637	594	+43	13	Promotion/relegation play off	74–79		82–74	95–74	85–64
3	Stoja	8	3	5	625	633	−8	11		78–93	64–55		68–76	94–60
4	Borovo	8	3	5	639	726	−87	11		68–111	76–87	80–102		101–81
5	Međimurje	8	1	7	624	740	−116	9		96–109	79–81	89–74	79–91	

=== Relegation/Promotion play-off ===
Relegation league 5th-placed team Škrljevo faces the 2nd-placed Promotion league side Jazine in a two-legged play-off. The winner on aggregate score after both matches will earn a spot in the 2016–17 A-1 League.

==== Škrljevo vs. Jazine ====
May 18 2016
19:30

Boxscore

Škrljevo	90–83	Jazine
Scoring by quarter: 18:21, 23:24, 26:15, 23:23
Pts: Kus 26		Pts: three players 16

Dvorana Mavrinci, Čavle
Attendance: -
Referees: -

May 22 2016
20:00 CEST

Boxscore

Jazine	75–78	Škrljevo
Scoring by quarter: 25:15, 12:25, 22:19, 16:19
Pts: Mrva 17		Pts: Kus 20

Krešimir Ćosić Hall, Zadar
Attendance: Alfred Jovović (Velika Gorica)
Zlatko Galiot (Zagreb)
Alan Blašković (Križevci)

Škrljevo retained its A-1 League status

== Playoffs ==
=== Bracket ===
Semifinals
1	Cedevita	2
4	Kvarner	0
2	Cibona	2
3	Zadar	1

Finals
1	Cedevita	3
2	Cibona	0

=== Semifinals ===
The semifinals are best-of-3 series.

==== Cedevita vs. Kvarner ====
May 18 2016
19:00 CEST

Boxscore

Cedevita	115–59	Kvarner
Scoring by quarter: 29:13, 33:18, 27:13, 26:15
Pts: Bilan 23; Rebs: Mazalin, Žorić 7 Asts: three players 5		Pts: Veljačić 16; Rebs: Marić 5 Asts: Marinelli 5
1-0

Dom Sportova, Zagreb
Attendance: 275
Referees: Alfred Jovović (Velika Gorica)
Luka Kardum (Šibenik)
Josip Jurčević (Split)

May 22 2016
17:00 CEST

Boxscore

Kvarner	64–83	Cedevita
Scoring by quarter: 20:24, 19:20, 20:21, 5:18
Pts: Marić 21; Rebs: Marić 11; Asts: Marinelli 4		Pts: Pullen, Žorić 12; Rebs: Babić 7 Asts: Gordić, Pullen 2
2-0

Dvorana Zamet, Rijeka
Attendance: 100
Referees: Roko Hordov (Zadar)
Damir Palavra (Zagreb)
Martin Vulić (Zadar)

==== Cibona vs. Zadar ====
May 18 2016
17:00 CEST

Boxscore

Cibona	104–79	Zadar
Scoring by quarter: 30:21, 22:16, 29:20, 23:22
Pts: Florence 19; Rebs: Žižić 12; Asts: Šiško 6		Pts: Barać 17; Rebs: Barać 8 Asts: Delaš 5
1-0

Dražen Petrović Basketball Hall, Zagreb
Attendance: 750
Referees: Siniša Herceg (Zabok)
Josip Radojković (Split)
Tomislav Vovk (Slavonski Brod)

May 21 2016
20:00 CEST

Boxscore

Zadar	73–70	Cibona
Scoring by quarter: 21:19, 21:12, 17:14, 14:25
Pts: Bašić 20; Rebs: three players 7 Asts: Bašić 3		Pts: Barać 19; Rebs: Rozić, Žižić 9 Asts: Krušlin 4
1-1

Krešimir Ćosić Hall, Zadar
Referees: Sreten Radović (Dubrovnik)
Srđan Dožai (Zagreb)
Nikola Perlić (Velika Gorica)

May 25 2016
20:00 CEST

Boxscore

Cibona	80–71	Zadar
Scoring by quarter: 18:15, 25:12, 16:21, 21:23
Pts: Florence 27; Rebs: Žižić 13; Asts: Krušlin, Šiško 4		Pts: Kraljević 20; Rebs: Ramljak 8 Asts: Bašić 5
2-1

Dražen Petrović Basketball Hall, Zagreb
Attendance: 3500
Referees: Sreten Radović (Dubrovnik)
Srđan Dožai (Zagreb)
Siniša Herceg (Zabok)

=== Finals ===
The semifinals are best-of-5 series.

==== Cedevita vs. Cibona ====
May 29 2016
20:00 CEST

Boxscore

Cedevita	87–76	Cibona
Scoring by quarter: 19:19, 20:24, 20:16, 28:17
Pts: Babić 20; Rebs: Babić 10; Asts: Gordić 9		Pts: Krušlin, Žožić 13; Rebs: Žižić, Ante Toni Žižić 6 Asts: Florence 6
1-0

Dom Sportova, Zagreb
Attendance: 1700
Referees: Sreten Radović (Dubrovnik)
Srđan Dožai (Zagreb)
Josip Radojković (Split)

May 31 2016
20:50 CEST

Boxscore

Cibona	83–97	Cedevita
Scoring by quarter: 25:32, 16:25, 19:24, 23:16
Pts: Sirišćević 25; Rebs: Slavica 10; Asts: Krušlin 7		Pts: White 19; Rebs: White 6 Asts: Babić 6
2-0

Dražen Petrović Basketball Hall, Zagreb
Attendance: 2000
Referees: Siniša Herceg (Zabok)
Roko Hordov (Zadar)
Alfred Jovović (Velika Gorica)

June 3 2016
20:00 CEST

Boxscore

Cedevita	84–77	Cibona
Scoring by quarter: 30:22, 22:20, 19:19, 13:16
Pts: Bilan 20; Rebs: Bilan, Babić 12; Asts: Babić 5		Pts: Siriščević 22; Rebs: Gospić 8 Asts: Florence 6
3-0

Dom Sportova, Zagreb
Attendance: 2000
Referees: Sreten Radović (Dubrovnik)
Srđan Dožai (Zagreb)
Roko Hordov (Zadar)

== Stats leaders ==
=== MVP of the Round ===
Championship round

Round	Player	Team	Efficiency
1	(Croatia) Luka Žorić	Cedevita	35
2	(Croatia) Ante Toni Žižić	Cibona	55
3	(Croatia) Fran Pilepić	Cedevita	35
4	(Croatia) Petar Marić	Kvarner	29
5	(United States) James Florence	Cibona	39
6	(Croatia) Miro Bilan	Cedevita	32
7	(Croatia) Ante Toni Žižić (2)	Cibona	34
8	(Croatia) Boris Barać	Zadar	27
9	(Croatia) Ante Toni Žižić (3)	Cibona	36
10	(Croatia) Ante Delaš	Zadar	30
11	(Croatia) Paolo Marinelli	Kvarner	31
12	(United States) James Florence (2)	Cibona	37
13	(Croatia) Ante Toni Žižić (4)	Cibona	52
14	(Croatia) Jakov Vladović	Zagreb	39

Play off

Round	Player	Team	Efficiency
1	(Croatia) Miro Bilan (2)	Cedevita	33
2	(Croatia) Petar Marić (2)	Kvarner	28
3	(Croatia) Filip Kraljević	Zadar	25
4	(Croatia) Luka Babić	Cedevita	25
5	(United States) James White	Cedevita	31
6	(Croatia) Miro Bilan (3)	Cedevita	27
