= 2019–20 GKK Šibenka season =

Šibenka
2019–20 season
- Chairman: (Croatia) Ante Burić
- Head coach: (Croatia) Miro Jurić (Croatia) Edi Dželalija
- Arena: Baldekin Sports Hall
- Croatian League: Canceled
- Krešimir Ćosić Cup: Quarter-finals
Home	Away
- All statistics correct as of July 9, 2020.

The 2019–20 GKK Šibenka season is the 10th season in the existence of the club. The club played in the Croatian League.

== Overview ==
On 13 June 2019, club's main sponsor Doğuş Group reported they will leave the club after 7 years as the main sponsor. On 27 June 2019, it was established a new board and owner led by the president Ante Burić. On 6 August 2019, club board reported that the club was changed name to GKK Šibenka (Građanski košarkaški klub Šibenka fully).

== Players ==
=== Squad information ===
GKK Šibenka roster
Players
Coaches

Pos.	No.	Nat.	Name	Ht.	Wt.
G/F	3	(Croatia)	Mileković, Ivan	1.96 m (6 ft 5 in)		38 – 18 August 1988
G	5	(Croatia)	Šarić, Domagoj	1.92 m (6 ft 4 in)		27 – 15 April 1999
G	6	(Croatia)	Živković, Ivan	1.96 m (6 ft 5 in)		24 – 22 January 2002
G/F	7	(Croatia)	Vuko, Tonko	2.03 m (6 ft 8 in)	103 kg (227 lb)	32 – 7 July 1994
G	8	(Croatia)	Gulin, Ivan	1.96 m (6 ft 5 in)		24 – 9 November 2001
G	9	(Croatia)	Bašić, Domagoj (C)	1.95 m (6 ft 5 in)		40 – 25 March 1986
PF	12	(Croatia)	Ivišić, Zvonimir	2.12 m (6 ft 11 in)		23 – 9 August 2003
C	13	(Croatia)	Vraneš, Ivan	2.06 m (6 ft 9 in)		30 – 25 May 1996
PF	14	(Croatia)	Ivišić, Tomislav	2.12 m (6 ft 11 in)		23 – 9 August 2003
G	20	(Croatia)	Klarin, Antonio	1.85 m (6 ft 1 in)		23 – 17 April 2003
SF	23	(Croatia)	Nakić, Toni	2.03 m (6 ft 8 in)		27 – 1 June 1999
SG	24	(Croatia)	Pleadin, Juraj	1.93 m (6 ft 4 in)		23 – 10 April 2003
PG	25	(Croatia)	Vlaić, Marko	1.98 m (6 ft 6 in)		26 – 25 June 2000
PG	50	(Croatia)	Vladović, Jakov	1.87 m (6 ft 2 in)	86 kg (190 lb)	43 – 17 April 1983
C		(Croatia)	Jurković, Valentin	2.09 m (6 ft 10 in)	100 kg (220 lb)	32 – 10 January 1994

Head coach

- (Croatia) Edi Dželalija

Assistant coach(es)

- (Croatia) Petar Maleš
- (Croatia) Dženan Rahimić

Physiotherapist(s)

- (Croatia) Slaven Periša

Legend

- (C) Team captain
- Injured

- Roster
Updated: January 28, 2020

=== Depth chart ===
Pos.	Starting 5	Bench 1	Bench 2	Bench 3
C	Ivan Vraneš	Valentin Jurković	Zvonimir Ivišić
PF	Tonko Vuko
SF	Toni Nakić	Tomislav Ivišić
SG	Ivan Mileković	Domagoj Bašić	Juraj Pleadin	Ivan Živković
PG	Jakov Vladović	Domagoj Šarić	Ivan Gulin	Marko Vlaić

=== Transactions ===
==== Players In ====
No.	Pos.	Nat.	Name	Moving from		Date	Source
13	C	(Bosnia and Herzegovina)	Mladen Primorac	Bosco	(Croatia)	19 July 2019	
3	G/F	(Croatia)	Ivan Mileković	Adria Oil Škrljevo	(Croatia)	24 July 2019	
4	PG	(Croatia)	Jakov Vladović	Cedevita Junior	(Croatia)	12 August 2019	
0	C	(United States)	Eric Cobb	Connecticut	(United States)	20 September 2019	
15	SF	(Montenegro)	Vladimir Dašić	Zadar	(Croatia)	20 September 2019	
13	C	(Croatia)	Ivan Vraneš	Gorica	(Croatia)	11 December 2019	
	C	(Croatia)	Valentin Jurković	SC Luetzel Basketball	(Germany)	7 January 2020	

==== Players Out ====
No.	Pos.	Nat.	Name	Moving to		Date	Source
23	PG	(Montenegro)	Nikola Korač	Novi Pazar	(Serbia)	July 2019	
3	G/F	(Croatia)	Ivan Mileković	Adria Oil Škrljevo	(Croatia)	July 2019	
44	PG	(Croatia)	Martin Klepo	Pula 1981	(Croatia)	13 August 2019	
13	C	(Bosnia and Herzegovina)	Mladen Primorac			9 November 2019	
15	SF	(Montenegro)	Vladimir Dašić			2 December 2019	
0	C	(United States)	Eric Cobb			13 December 2019	
44	PF	(Croatia)	Pavao Paić			28 January 2020	

== Club ==
=== Technical Staff ===
Position	Staff member
General Manager	(Croatia) Damir Grandeš
Sports Director	(Croatia) Filip Vukičević
Head coach	(Croatia) Edi Dželalija
Assistant coaches	(Croatia) Petar Maleš
Assistant coaches	(Croatia) Dženan Rahimić
Conditioning coach	(Croatia) Krešo Baljkas
Physiotherapist	(Croatia) Slaven Periša

== Competitions ==
=== Croatian League ===
==== Regular season ====
Pos	Team	Pld	W	L	PF	PA	PD	Pts
3	Split	21	15	6	1823	1645	+178	36
4	Gorica	21	15	6	1756	1585	+171	36
5	Šibenka	21	12	9	1689	1687	+2	33
6	Vrijednosnice	21	11	10	1861	1889	−28	32
7	Zabok	21	9	12	1714	1646	+68	30

Source: Croatian Basketball Federation

Win Loss

==== Matches ====
28 September 2019 1	Šibenka	75–62	Hermes Analitica	Šibenik
19:00	Scoring by quarter: 20–16, 11–14, 22–17, 22–15
		Report		Arena: Baldekin Sports Hall; Attendance: 800

5 October 2019 2	Sonik Puntamika	58–76	Šibenka	Zadar
19:00	Scoring by quarter: 13–21, 14–20, 21–17, 10–18
		Report		Arena: Jazine Basketball Hall; Attendance: 200
