= 2019–20 Hrvatski telekom Premijer liga =

Hrvatski telekom Premijer liga
- Season: 2019–20
- Duration: September 2019 – March 2020
- Teams: 12
- TV partners: HRT; Arena Sport

Regular season
- Season MVP: None
- Promoted: None
- Relegated: None

Finals
- Champions: Null and void
- All statistics correct as of 1 April 2020.

The 2019–20 Hrvatski telekom Premijer liga was the 29th season of the HT Premijer liga, the highest professional basketball league in Croatia. The regular season started in September 2019. On 1 April 2020, the Croatian Basketball Federation canceled the season due to ongoing coronavirus pandemic.

== Format ==
All participants in Premijer liga including teams that play ABA League joined the regular season. It will play with a triple round-robin format where the eight first qualified teams joined the playoffs, while the penultimate will be play relegation playoffs and last qualified one was relegated.

== Current teams ==
=== Promotion and relegation ===
Teams promoted from the First League

- Dubrava Furnir
- Sonik Puntamika

Teams relegated to the First League

- Bosco
- Cedevita Junior

=== Venues and locations ===
Location of teams in the 2019–20 HT Premijer liga

Team	Home city	Arena	Capacity
Adria Oil Škrljevo	Čavle	Mavrinci Hall	720
Alkar	Sinj	Ivica Glavan "Ićo" Sports Hall	600
Cibona	Zagreb	Dražen Petrović Basketball Hall	5,400
Dubrava Furnir	Zagreb	Dubrava Sports Hall	2,000
Gorica	Velika Gorica	Velika Gorica High Schools' Hall	1,000
Hermes Analitica	Zagreb	Dražen Petrović Basketball Hall	5,400
Sonik Puntamika	Zadar	Jazine Basketball Hall	3,000
Split	Split	Arena Gripe	3,500
Šibenka	Šibenik	Baldekin Sports Hall	900
Vrijednosnice	Osijek	Gradski vrt Hall	3,538
Zabok	Zabok	Zabok Sports Hall	3,000
Zadar	Zadar	Krešimir Ćosić Hall	7,997

Teams that play in the 2019–20 First Adriatic League
Teams that play in the 2019–20 Second Adriatic League
Teams that play in the 2019–20 Alpe Adria Cup

=== Personnel and sponsorships ===
Team	Head coach	Captain	Kit manufacturer	Shirt sponsor
Adria Oil Škrljevo	(Croatia) Damir Rajković		GBT	Renault RB Auto / Metis d.o.o.
Alkar	(Croatia) Damir Milačić		Jako	IDS Šibenik
Cibona	(Bosnia and Herzegovina) Ivan Velić	(Croatia) Marin Rozić	Visual	Erste Bank
Dubrava Furnir	(Croatia) Vladimir Krstić		Legea	
Gorica	(Croatia) Josip Sesar		Sportika	Matić Tech Cut
Hermes Analitica	(Croatia) Gordan Zadravec		Adidas	Orlando
Sonik Puntamika	(Croatia) Šime Kraljević		Adidas	Sonik
Split	(Croatia) Ivica Skelin	(Croatia) Mateo Kedžo	Macron	Bobis
Šibenka	(Croatia) Edi Dželalija	(Croatia) Domagoj Bašić	Errea	NP Krka
Vrijednosnice	(Croatia) Domagoj Kujundžić	(Croatia) Nikola Turalija	Nike	
Zabok	(Croatia) Ivan Tomas		Joma	Terme Tuhelj
Zadar	(Croatia) Danijel Jusup	(Croatia) Ive Ivanov	Visual	Crodux / OTP Bank

=== Coaching changes ===
Team	Outgoing manager	Date of vacancy	Position in table	Replaced with	Date of appointment	Ref.
Alkar	(Croatia) Srđan Helbich	June 2019	Pre-season	(Croatia) Damir Milačić	18 June 2019	
Hermes Analitica	(Croatia) Zvonimir Mravak	August 2019	Pre-season	(Croatia) Gordan Zadravec	August 2019	
Zadar	(Croatia) Ante Nazor	19 October 2019	8th (2–1)	(Croatia) Danijel Jusup	23 October 2019	
Šibenka	(Croatia) Miro Jurić	2 November 2019	3rd (4–2)	(Croatia) Edi Dželalija	4 November 2019	
Dubrava Furnir	(Croatia) Darko Krunić	18 November 2019	11th (1–7)	(Croatia) Vladimir Krstić	19 November 2019	
Split	(Croatia) Ante Grgurević	8 December 2019		(Croatia) Ivica Skelin	8 December 2019	

== Regular season ==
=== League table ===
Pos	Team	Pld	W	L	PF	PA	PD	Pts
1	Zadar	21	18	3	1929	1587	+342	39
2	Cibona	21	17	4	2017	1553	+464	38
3	Split	21	15	6	1823	1645	+178	36
4	Gorica	21	15	6	1756	1585	+171	36
5	Šibenka	21	12	9	1689	1687	+2	33
6	Vrijednosnice	21	11	10	1861	1889	−28	32
7	Zabok	21	9	12	1714	1646	+68	30
8	Alkar	21	8	13	1649	1824	−175	29
9	Sonik Puntamika	21	7	14	1602	1704	−102	28
10	Adria Oil Škrljevo	21	7	14	1630	1819	−189	28
11	Dubrava Furnir	21	5	16	1618	1965	−347	26
12	Hermes Analitica	21	2	19	1548	1932	−384	23

Source: Croatian Basketball Federation

=== Results ===
Home \ Away	ADR	ALK	CIB	DUB	GOR	HER	SON	SPL	ŠIB	VRI	ZAB	ZAD
Adria Oil Škrljevo	—	87–74	55–114	80–83	72–91	77–63	68–60	69–97	87–90	96–89	103–97	72–79
Alkar	72–68	—	81–98	93–76	77–84	0	102–89	68–95	87–73	89–90	76–73	93–84
Cibona	0	103–72	—	107–64	84–89	122–75	102–58	96–66	111–77	101–97	82–87	90–71
Dubrava Furnir	68–84	88–81	78–113	—	0	91–84	87–80	74–86	78–88	87–96	84–106	76–113
Gorica	79–88	91–74	50–75	95–60	—	85–66	91–74	81–87	99–80	102–90	87–63	74–73
Hermes Analitica	88–84	76–79	70–111	71–88	82–117	—	77–88	67–106	62–88	90–95	80–78	88–106
Sonik Puntamika	75–60	64–74	81–85	86–66	67–74	78–65	—	93–90	58–76	68–84	75–66	61–80
Split	97–78	99–69	82–74	93–71	71–65	86–71	0	—	79–92	100–73	92–77	67–80
Šibenka	82–70	83–72	76–96	95–72	58–82	75–62	87–80	71–79	—	74–85	81–70	74–81
Vrijednosnice	108–96	91–72	87–99	94–79	95–96	72–71	102–95	99–103	0	—	89–85	75–87
Zabok	109–62	86–51	58–77	99–66	82–63	92–71	83–92	85–74	74–83	85–78	—	59–80
Zadar	104–74	116–93	79–77	121–82	67–61	114–69	85–80	92–74	103–76	114–72	0	—

Source: Croatian Basketball Federation
Legend: Blue = home team win; Red = away team win.

== See also ==
- 2019–20 ABA League First Division
- 2019–20 ABA League Second Division
- 2019–20 Croatian First Basketball League
- 2019–20 Croatian Women's Basketball League

Teams

- 2019–20 GKK Šibenka season

== Notes ==
1. After the end of the previous season, Cedevita decided to move to Ljubljana, Slovenia and agreed with Slovenian club Olimpija Ljubljana to make a fusion and establish the new Slovenian club Cedevita Olimpija. As well, Cedevita Junior is formed in Zagreb. The current Cedevita Junior is not a direct fused Cedevita follow-up, which is why the Croatian Basketball Federation did not approve of Cedevita Junior's performance in the 2019–20 season. Instead of Cedevita Junior, Dubrava was promoted to the first tier.
