= Slavko Duščak =

Slovene basketball player and coach

Personal information
- Born: 2 January 1974 (age 52) Ljubljana, SFR Yugoslavia
- Listed height: 6 ft 3 in (1.91 m)

Career information
- Playing career: 1991–2007
- Position: Shooting guard

Career history

Playing
- 1991–1995: Slovan
- 1996-2000: Smelt Olimpija
- 2000–2002: Pivovarna Laško
- 2002–2004: Krka
- 2004: Teramo Basket
- 2005: Elektra Esotech
- 2005: Anwil Włocławek
- 2006: Soproni KC
- 2007: Union Olimpija
- 2009: Koper

Coaching
- 2012–2013: Postojna (assistant)
- 2013: Postojna
- 2013–2014: Slovan (assistant)
- 2014–2015: ŽKK Grosuplje (assistant)
- 2015–2022: ŽKK Grosuplje
- 2022–: ŽKD Ježica

Career highlights
- 4x Slovenian League champion (1997, 1998, 1999, 2003); 3x Slovenian Cup winner (1997, 1998, 1999)

Slavko Duščak (born January 2, 1974) is a Slovenian professional basketball coach and former player.

== Professional career ==
Duščak played for Slovan, Olimpija, Pivovarna Laško, Krka, Teramo Basket, Elektra Esotech, Anwil Włocławek, Soproni KC and Koper.

== National team career ==
Duščak was a member of the Slovenia national basketball team. Over 29 appearances he scored 140 points. He competed at Eurobasket 2003.

== Personal life ==
His son Dan (born 2002) is a professional basketball player for Cedevita Olimpija.
