= 2016–17 A-1 League =

A-1 League
- Season: 2016–17
- Duration: 5 October 2016 – 23 April 2017 (Regular season); 26 April 2017 – 1 June 2017 (Playoffs)
- Games played: 182
- Teams: 14
- TV partner(s): HRT; Arena Sport

Regular season
- Top seed: Šibenik
- Promoted: Jazine Arbanasi
- Relegated: Kvarner 2010

Finals
- Champions: Cedevita (4th title)
- Runners-up: Cibona
- Semifinalists: Šibenik; Split

Statistical leaders
Points	(United States) Brandon Johnson (Alkar)	22.3
Rebounds	(Croatia) Miro Bilan (Cedevita)	8.2
Assists	(United States) Brandon Johnson (Alkar)	8.1

Records
- Biggest home win: Jolly JBŠ 91–49 Gorica
- Biggest away win: Zabok 69–93 Šibenik
- Highest scoring: Gorica 124–113 Hermes
- Highest attendance: 6,000; Cibona vs. Cedevita; Finals, Game 5
- Lowest attendance: 20; Hermes Analitica vs. Šibenik
- All statistics correct as of 12 May 2017.

The 2016–17 A-1 League (Croatian: A-1 liga 2016./17.) was the 26th season of the A-1 League, the highest professional basketball league in Croatia. The season started on 5 October 2016 and finished on 1 June 2017. Cedevita won its fourth national championship after defeating Cibona in the playoffs final.

== Format ==
All participants in A-1 League including teams that played in the ABA League joined the regular season. It was played in a double round-robin format where the eight first qualified teams joined the playoffs while the last qualified one was directly relegated and the 13th qualified played a relegation playoff.

== Teams ==
Location of teams in the A-1 League 2016–17

Team	Coach	City	Venue	Capacity
Alkar	(Croatia) Damir Milačić	Sinj	Sinj Sports Hall	1,500
Cedevita	(Croatia) Veljko Mršić	Zagreb	Dom Sportova	3,100
Cibona	(Croatia) Damir Mulaomerović	Zagreb	Dražen Petrović Basketball Hall	5,400
Gorica	(Bosnia and Herzegovina) Boris Džidić	Velika Gorica	Velika Gorica High Schools' Hall	1,000
Hermes Analitica	(Croatia) Zvonimir Mravak	Zagreb	Vladimir Prelog Science and Mathematics School's Sports Hall	600
Jolly Jadranska banka Šibenik	(Bosnia and Herzegovina) Ivan Velić	Šibenik	Baldekin Sports Hall	1,500
Kvarner 2010	(Croatia) Marijan Mance	Rijeka	Dinko Lukarić Hall	1,100
Split	(Croatia) Ivica Skelin	Split	Arena Gripe	3,500
Šibenik	(Croatia) Vladimir Anzulović	Šibenik	Baldekin Sports Hall	1,500
Škrljevo	(Croatia) Damir Rajković	Škrljevo	Mavrinci Hall	1,000
Vrijednosnice Osijek	(Croatia) Vladimir Krstić	Osijek	Gradski vrt Hall	3,538
Zabok	(Croatia) Dragutin Črnjević	Zabok	Zabok Sports Hall	3,000
Zadar	(Croatia) Aramis Naglić	Zadar	Krešimir Ćosić Hall	8,500
Zagreb	(Croatia) Danijel Jusup	Zagreb	Trnsko Sports Hall	2,500

Teams that play in the 2016–17 Adriatic League
Teams that play in the 2016–17 Alpe Adria Cup

== Regular season ==
=== League table ===
Pos	Team	Pld	W	L	PF	PA	PD	Pts	Qualification or relegation
1	Šibenik	26	21	5	2254	1932	+322	47	Qualification to playoffs
2	Split	26	21	5	2137	1949	+188	47	Qualification to playoffs
3	Jolly JBŠ	26	20	6	2215	1957	+258	46	Qualification to playoffs
4	Cibona	26	20	6	2241	2012	+229	46	Qualification to playoffs
5	Zadar	26	19	7	2185	1989	+196	45	Qualification to playoffs
6	Cedevita	26	18	8	2226	1889	+337	44	Qualification to playoffs
7	Vrijednosnice	26	13	13	1964	1934	+30	39	Qualification to playoffs
8	Zagreb	26	12	14	2147	2179	−32	38	Qualification to playoffs
9	Škrljevo	26	10	16	1975	2028	−53	36	
10	Zabok	26	8	18	2127	2352	−225	34	
11	Alkar	26	6	20	1923	2235	−312	32	
12	Hermes Analitica	26	6	20	2043	2362	−319	32	
13	Gorica	26	6	20	2022	2324	−302	32	Qualification to relegation playoffs
14	Kvarner 2010 (R)	26	2	24	1897	2214	−317	28	Relegation to A-2 Liga

Source: Croatian Basketball Federation
(R) Relegated

=== Results ===
Home \ Away	ALK	CED	CIB	GOR	HER	JOL	KVA	SPL	ŠIB	ŠKR	VRO	ZAB	ZAD	ZAG
Alkar		63–83	80–98	95–78	89–64	63–85	89–71	56–93	81–89	75–73	54–87	76–78	89–83	72–90
Cedevita	111–71		90–71	92–70	106–85	82–66	75–43	69–76	64–69	93–78	75–65	112–81	77–75	95–73
Cibona	89–60	71–69		90–65	96–78	78–87	93–77	76–70	94–83	98–71	97–69	94–83	102–88	91–87
Gorica	94–67	68–88	70–80		124–113	92–109	92–82	60–79	81–99	73–83	80–64	109–95	81–99	78–87
Hermes Analitica	89–80	67–106	80–89	99–73		79–90	81–78	69–76	61–92	97–77	80–87	93–86	73–96	82–92
Jolly JBŠ	101–76	84–78	80–75	91–49	100–59		87–81	98–62	77–76	86–74	74–62	94–78	87–57	96–79
Kvarner	53–57	78–85	86–98	73–77	78–72	76–92		81–88	76–98	67–93	50–47	76–69	72–77	67–72
Split	85–74	66–63	82–75	89–70	91–61	85–77	88–69		107–106	78–71	84–80	105–68	91–94	77–71
GKK Šibenik	78–70	95–81	67–69	100–75	93–75	87–77	94–75	92–73		88–68	78–66	89–64	64–53	108–73
Škrljevo	91–84	80–77	74–92	85–69	87–77	80–93	83–72	59–61	60–74		59–75	90–58	67–70	74–55
Vrijednosnice Osijek	76–69	70–98	78–71	92–78	101–76	62–64	84–66	62–72	80–81	72–75		84–78	77–80	75–63
Zabok	104–84	85–103	78–84	78–68	83–88	98–85	85–83	71–86	69–93	88–80	76–85		87–84	83–95
Zadar	101–67	71–63	90–80	97–53	92–76	84–72	101–64	84–89	80–76	74–65	73–64	95–81		94–86
Zagreb	80–71	68–91	70–90	98–95	100–69	85–63	96–75	93–84	83–85	82–78	69–75	114–118	86–93	

Source: Eurobasket.com
Legend: Blue = home team win; Red = away team win.

== Playoffs ==
Quarterfinals
1	Šibenik	2
8	Zagreb	0
4	Cibona	2
5	Zadar	1
3	Jolly JBŠ	0
6	Cedevita	2
2	Split	2
7	Vrijednosnice	1

Semifinals
1	Šibenik	0
4	Cibona	2
6	Cedevita	2
2	Split	0

Final
4	Cibona	2
6	Cedevita	3
