= 2017 A1 League playoffs =

The 2017 A-1 League Playoffs was a play-off tournament that decided the winner of the 2016–17 A-1 League. The playoffs started on April 25, 2017 and finished on June 1, 2017. Cedevita won its fourth consecutive title defeating Cibona 3–2 in the final series.

== Bracket ==
Quarterfinals
1	Šibenik	2
8	Zagreb	0
5	Cibona	2
4	Zadar	1
3	Jolly JBŠ	0
6	Cedevita	2
2	Split	2
7	Vrijednosnice	1

Semifinals
Šibenik	0
Cibona	2
Cedevita	2
Split	0

Finals
Cibona	2
Cedevita	3

== Quarterfinals ==
=== (1) Šibenik vs. (8) Zagreb ===
27 April
18:00

Šibenik	84–78	Zagreb
Pts: Halilović 21; Rebs: Halilović 10

Sportska dvorana Baldekin, Šibenik

30 April
12:00

Zagreb	96–123	Šibenik
Pts: Božić 29		Pts: Siriščević, Halilović 13

Trnsko Sports Hall, Zagreb

Šibenik won series 2–0

=== (4) Cibona vs. (5) Zadar ===
27 April
20:00

Cibona	95–81	Zadar
Pts: Žorić 26

Dražen Petrović Basketball Hall, Zagreb

30 April
18:00

Zadar	68–56	Cibona

Krešimir Ćosić Hall, Zadar

4 May
20:00

Cibona	88–66	Zadar

Dražen Petrović Basketball Hall, Zagreb

Cibona won series 2–1

=== (3) Jolly JBŠ vs. (6) Cedevita ===
26 April

Jolly JBŠ	66–85	Cedevita

Sportska dvorana Baldekin, Šibenik

29 April
17:00

Cedevita	85–65	Jolly JBŠ

Dom Sportova, Zagreb

Cedevita won series 2–0

=== (2) Split vs. (7) Vrijednosnice ===
26 April

Split	67–59	Vrijednosnice

Arena Gripe, Split

29 April
19:00

Vrijednosnice	85–65	Split

Gradski vrt Hall, Osijek

3 May
18:00

Split	64–57	Vrijednosnice

Arena Gripe, Split

Split won series 2–1

== Semifinals ==
=== (1) Šibenik vs. (5) Cibona ===
7 May
18:00

Šibenik	67–70	Cibona
Pts: Siriščević 14

Sportska dvorana Baldekin, Šibenik

10 May
18:00

Cibona	72–66	Šibenik

Dražen Petrović Basketball Hall, Zagreb

Cibona won series 2–0

=== (2) Split vs. (6) Cedevita ===
7 May
20:30

Split	78–97	Cedevita

Arena Gripe, Split

11 May
20:00

Cedevita	82–52	Split

Dom Sportova, Zagreb

Cedevita won series 2–0

== Final ==
=== (5) Cibona vs. (6) Cedevita ===
17 May
20:00

Cibona	73–79	Cedevita
Pts: Žorić 24		Pts: Krušlin 18

Dražen Petrović Basketball Hall, Zagreb
Attendance: 3,000

20 May
20:00

Cedevita	85–91	Cibona
Pts: Boatright 17		Pts: Rozić 20

Dom Sportova, Zagreb
Attendance: 2,000

25 May
20:15

Cibona	72–67	Cedevita
Pts: Šakić 25		Pts: Bilan 19

Dražen Petrović Basketball Hall, Zagreb
Attendance: 5,000

28 May
20:00

Cedevita	79–54	Cibona
Pts: Musa 16		Pts: Bošnjak 14

Dom Sportova, Zagreb
Attendance: 3,000

1 June
20:00

Cibona	75–78	Cedevita
Pts: Žorić 17		Pts: Boatright 22

Dražen Petrović Basketball Hall, Zagreb
Attendance: 6,000

Cedevita won series 3–2
