= Petar Marić =

Croatian basketball player

No. 5 – Jazine
- Position: Shooting guard
- League: Croatian League

Personal information
- Born: 2 November 1987 (age 39) Zadar, SR Croatia, SFR Yugoslavia
- Listed height: 6 ft 5 in (1.96 m)

Career information
- NBA draft: 2009: undrafted
- Playing career: 2005–present

Career history
- 2005–2006: Voštarnica
- 2006–2007: Zagreb
- 2007–2008: Vajda Čakovec
- 2008–2010: Voštarnica
- 2010–2012: Borik Puntamika
- 2012–2015: Zabok
- 2015–2016: Kvarner 2010
- 2016–2017: Cibona
- 2017–2018: Zabok
- 2018–2019: Zadar
- 2019–2020: Sonik-Puntamika
- 2020–2021: Zabok
- 2021–2022: Sonik-Puntamika
- 2022–present: Jazine

Petar Marić (born November 2, 1987) is a Croatian professional basketball player for Jazine of the Croatian second-tier Prva muška liga. Standing at 1.96 m, he plays at the shooting guard position.

== Biography ==
Marić played for the youth selections for his hometown club Zadar. He signed his first professional contract with another club from Zadar, Voštarnica. Since 2010 he plays in the Croatian top-tier A-1 Liga. He spent the longest period, altogether four seasons in two stints, in Zabok, a team he also captained.

After a very good season in Kvarner 2010 in Summer 2016 he was signed by Croatian power-house Cibona where he spent one season.

After spending another season in Zabok, in July 2018 he signed a one-year contract with Zadar.

In September 2019, Marić renewed his contract with Zadar by one more year. In December, 2019, his contract with Zadar was terminated and Marić moved back to Sonik-Puntamika. Marić averaged 12.7 points, 3.3 rebounds, 3.1 assists and 1.3 steals per game. On 1 October 2020, he rejoined Zabok.
