= Henrik Širko =

Croatian basketball player

No. 31 – Zabok
- Position: Small forward

Personal information
- Born: January 23, 1993 (age 33) Šibenik, Croatia
- Listed height: 1.98 m (6 ft 6 in)
- Listed weight: 94 kg (207 lb)

Career information
- Playing career: 2008–present

Career history
- 2008–2011: Šibenka
- 2011–2014: Kvarner 2010
- 2014–2015: Zadar
- 2015–2018: Split
- 2018–2019: Peristeri
- 2019–2020: Peja
- 2020–2021: Šibenka
- 2021: Peja
- 2021–2023: Ylli
- 2023–2025: Prishtina
- 2025: Bora
- 2025–present: Zabok

Career highlights
- Balkan League champion (2024); Kosovo Superleague champion (2022); Kosovo Cup winner (2020); Kosovo Cup MVP (2020); Croatian League MVP (2021)

Henrik Širko (born January 23, 1993) is a Croatian professional basketball player currently playing for Bora of the Kosovo Basketball Superleague. Standing at 1.98 m, he plays at the small forward position.

== Professional career ==
Širko started playing basketball in his home town of Šibenik, but never spent much time on court until he moved to Kvarner coached by Aramis Naglić. He spent a season in Zadar before moving to Split. After spending three seasons there affirming himself as one of the key players of the club, in July 2018 he signed with the Greek Peristeri.

In August 2019, he joined Zabok of the Croatian League, signing an open contract allowing him to leave the club easily if a better offer occurred. Without playing a single game for Zabok, in September 2019, Širko moved to Peja of the Kosovo Superleague.

On August 8, 2020, Širko returned to his hometown signing with Šibenka of the Croatian League.

Širko returned to Peja of the Kosovo Basketball Superleague at the start of the 2021–22 season. In December, 2021, he moved to Golden Eagle Ylli playing in the same league.
