= 2002–03 ULEB Cup Semi finals =

The 2002–03 ULEB Cup Semi finals basketball statistics are here. The 2002–03 ULEB Cup was the inaugural season of Europe's secondary level professional club basketball tournament, the ULEB Cup, which is organised by Euroleague Basketball.

== Semifinal 1 ==
	Home team	Score	Away team	Venue	Attendance	Date
Game 1	DKV Joventut (Spain)	82 - 69	(Slovenia) Krka Novo Mesto	Pabellon Municipal, Badalona	11554	March 18, 2003
Game 2	Krka Novo Mesto (Slovenia)	82 - 66	(Spain) DKV Joventut	Leon Štukelj Hall, Novo Mesto	2000	March 25, 2003

=== Semifinal 2 ===
	Home team	Score	Away team	Venue	Attendance	Date
Game 1	Pamesa Valencia (Spain)	68 - 55	(Spain) Adecco Estudiantes	Fuente San Luis, Valencia	8800	March 18, 2003
Game 2	Adecco Estudiantes (Spain)	75 - 68	(Spain) Pamesa Valencia	Palacio Vistalegre, Madrid	14000	March 26, 2003

== See also ==
- 2002–03 in Spanish basketball
