= Paolo Marinelli =

Croatian basketball player (born 1995)

Fiorenzuola Bees
- Position: Point guard
- League: Serie A2

Personal information
- Born: 10 April 1995 (age 31) Rijeka, Croatia
- Listed height: 1.91 m (6 ft 3 in)
- Listed weight: 82 kg (181 lb)

Career information
- NBA draft: 2017: undrafted
- Playing career: 2011–present

Career history
- 2011–2013: Split
- 2013–2016: Union Olimpija
- 2015–2016: → Kvarner 2010
- 2016–2017: Cibona
- 2017–2020: Krka
- 2020–2021: Dzūkija Alytus
- 2021: Adria Oil Škrljevo
- 2021: Mons-Hainaut
- 2021–2023: Évreux
- 2023: CSU Sibiu
- 2023–2025: Kvarner 2010
- 2025–2026: Split
- 2026–present: Fiorenzuola Bees

Career highlights
- Croatian Cup winner (2026); Stanković Cup winner (2018)
Medals
Men's basketball
Representing Croatia
World U-17 Championship
Bronze medal – third place	2012 Lithuania	U-17 Team
European U-18 Championship
Silver medal – second place	2013 Latvia	U-18 Team
European U-16 Championship
Gold medal – first place	2011 Czech Republic	U-16 Team

Paolo Marinelli (born 10 April 1995) is a Croatian professional basketball player for the Fiorenzuola Bees of the Italian Serie A2. Standing at 1.91 m (6' 3") he plays at the point guard position.

== Professional career ==
Marinelli started playing basketball for the youth selection of KK Jadran before joining Akademija Vujčić in 2011. He made his senior debut against KK Alkar in A-1 Liga in February 2012, when he played 7 minutes. After his debut, he became a regular player for Split, playing in A-1 Liga and Adriatic League.

In August 2013, Marinelli signed four-year contract with Union Olimpija.

In his first season in Ljubljana, Marinelli had a minor role in the team, playing 9 games in the Adriatic League.

After struggling with injuries in the Olimpija roster in November 2014, Marinelli got more chances on the pitch. On 3 December 2014, he scored a career-high 18 points in an 89 - 67 win over Szolnoki Olaj KK (Round 8, Eurocup).

On 11 August 2015 he was loaned to Kvarner 2010 of the Croatian A-1 Liga for the 2015–16 season.

On 7 November 2021, Marinelli signed in Belgium with Belfius Mons-Hainaut of the BNXT League.

In December 2021, Marinelli signed with Évreux of the French second-tier Pro B league.

== Personal life ==
Marinelli is a member of the Italian Community in Dalmatia.

== Individual awards ==
- 2013 FIBA Europe Under-18 Championship: All-Tournament Team
