= Veljačić =

Veljačić is a surname. Notable people with the surname include:

- Mauro Veljačić (born 1993), Croatian basketball player
- Miranda Veljačić (born 1976), Croatian architect
