= Jakov Vladović =

Croatian basketball player (born 1983)

Sonik-Puntamika
- Title: Assistant coach
- League: Croatian League

Personal information
- Born: 17 April 1983 (age 43) Zadar, SR Croatia, SFR Yugoslavia
- Listed height: 1.87 m (6 ft 2 in)
- Listed weight: 86 kg (190 lb)

Career information
- NBA draft: 2005: undrafted
- Playing career: 2001–2021
- Position: Point guard
- Number: 4, 5, 15

Career history
- 2001–2007: Zadar
- 2007–2009: Zagreb
- 2009–2010: Lokomotiv Rostov
- 2010–2011: Zadar
- 2011–2012: Široki WWin
- 2012–2013: Krka
- 2013–2014: Union Olimpija
- 2014: Zagreb
- 2014–2015: Lietkabelis
- 2015–2016: Zagreb
- 2016–2018: Zadar
- 2018: Jazine Arbanasi
- 2018–2019: Hermes Analitica
- 2019: Cedevita
- 2019–2020: Šibenka
- 2020–2021: Sonik-Puntamika

Coaching
- 2021–present: Sonik-Puntamika (assistant)

Career highlights
- ABA League champion (2003); Croatian League champion (2005); Bosnian League champion (2012); Slovenian League champion (2013); 5× Croatian Cup winner (2003, 2005–2008); Bosnian Cup winner (2012)
Medals
Men's basketball
Representing Croatia
Mediterranean Games
| Gold medal – first place | 2009 Pescara | Team competition |

Jakov Vladović (born 17 April 1983) is a Croatian professional basketball coach and former basketball player. Standing at 1.87 m, he played at the point guard position.

== Professional career ==
Vladović began his career in Zadar. He spent there six seasons during which we won the Adriatic League, the Croatian League and four Croatian Cups.

In the summer of 2007, he moved to Zagreb. In his first season there, he wins another Croatian Cup. During the 2008–09 season he had a lot of health problems, which is why he missed a significant number of games. In the Adriatic League he played only 11 games with an average of 10.8 points, two assists and 2.3 rebounds in 24:42 minutes. At the end of the season he left KK Zagreb and agreed to a one-year collaboration with Russian top-level club Lokomotiv Rostov.

In 2010, he returns to Zadar, now playing as the captain of the team (11.7 points, 4.3 rebounds, 2.9 assists in the Adriatic League). The next season, he played at the Bosnian Široki Wwin and won the Bosnian League and Cup.

The 2012–13 season the spent at Krka, participating in the Adriatic League (8.3 points, 4.0 rebounds, 4.3 assists), EuroChallenge (10.7 points, 4.8 rebounds, 3.5 assists ) and winning the Slovenian League.

In October 2013, he signed with Union Olimpija.

In December 2014, he signed with the Lithuanian team Lietkabelis.

In March 2015, Vladović once more returned to Zagreb.

After one season spent in Zagreb, Vladović once again returns to Zadar. This time he spent two seasons in Zadar. The better part of the 2017–18 season he missed due to injury.

In September 2018 he signed with the second hometown club of his career, Jazine Arbanasi. After playing only one game for them in the Croatian League, he signed another short-term contract with another team playing in the Croatian League, Hermes Analitica.

On 4 January 2019, he parted ways with Hermes Analitica and signed for Cedevita to play in the club's "B team" competing in the Croatian League.

On 12 August 2019, he signed with GKK Šibenka.

In September 2020, Vladović signed with his home town club Sonik-Puntamika playing in the Croatian League.

In August 2021, Vladović announced his retirement from his basketball career at age 38.

== Coaching career ==
In the summer of 2021, Vladović was named the assistant coach of the team in which he ended his playing career, Sonik-Puntamika.

== Croatian national team ==
Vladović was a member of the Croatian national team B, which won the gold medal at the 2009 Mediterranean Games in Pescara.
