= Trey Freeman =

American basketball player (born 1992)

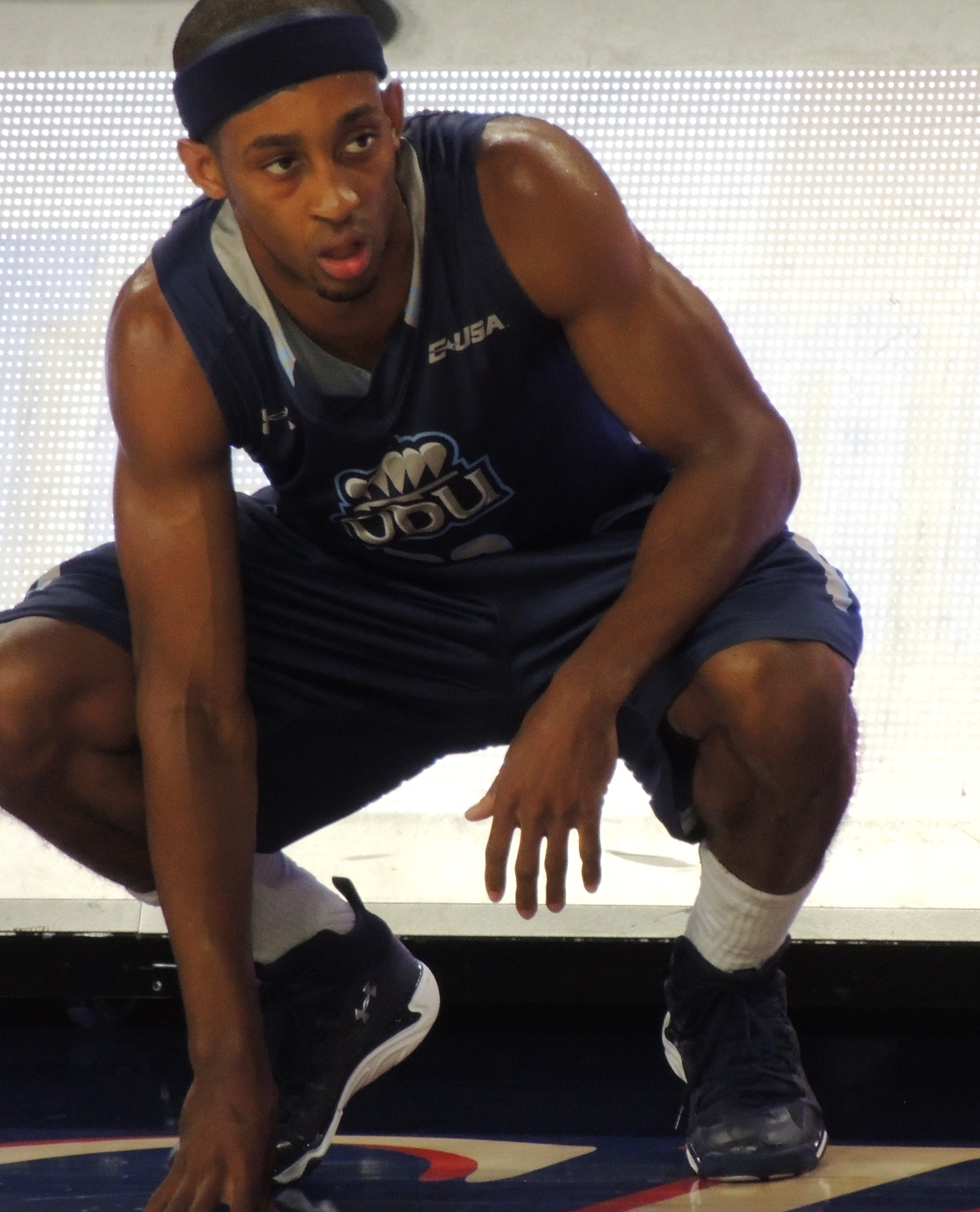
- Freeman waiting to check into a 2015 game

Šibenka
- Position: Point guard / shooting guard
- League: Croatian League

Personal information
- Born: October 12, 1992 (age 34) Virginia Beach, Virginia
- Listed height: 6 ft 3 in (1.91 m)
- Listed weight: 185 lb (84 kg)

Career information
- High school: Kellam (Virginia Beach, Virginia)
- College: Campbell (2011–2013); Old Dominion (2014–2016)
- NBA draft: 2016: undrafted
- Playing career: 2016–present

Career history
- 2016–2017: Grand Rapids Drive
- 2017–2020: Indios de Mayagüez
- 2020–present: Šibenka

Career highlights
- 2× First-team All-Conference USA (2015, 2016); Conference USA Newcomer of the Year (2015); Big South Freshman of the Year (2012)
- Stats at Basketball Reference

James H. "Trey" Freeman III (born October 12, 1992) is an American professional basketball player for Šibenka of the Croatian League. He played college basketball for Old Dominion University and Campbell University.

== High school career ==
Freeman attended Floyd E. Kellam High School where he averaged 20 points, 5.1 rebounds, 4.8 assists and 1.9 steals per game while shooting 60.5 percent from the field, 49.1 percent from 3-point territory as a senior, leading the Knights to the Beach District regular season and tournament championships with a 27–0 record. For his efforts, he was named Beach District Player of the Year and first-team all-district as well as to the Virginian-Pilot All-Tidewater First Team.

== College career ==
Freeman originally committed to Campbell. As a freshman, he averaged 13.9 points and 3.8 assists per game and was named the Big South Conference Freshman of the Year. After a strong sophomore season, Freeman elected to transfer to Old Dominion. He applied for a waiver of the NCAA (NCAA) transfer redshirt rule, but his waiver was denied. Freeman had two productive seasons at Old Dominion, earning first-team All-Conference USA honors both seasons. For his career, Freeman scored 2,000 points.

== Professional career ==
After going undrafted in the 2016 NBA draft, Freeman joined the Houston Rockets for the 2016 NBA Summer League. On September 26, 2016, he signed with the Detroit Pistons, but was waived on October 22 after appearing in one preseason game. On October 30, he was acquired by the Grand Rapids Drive of the NBA Development League as an affiliate of the Pistons.

On July 4, 2017, Freeman entered Baloncesto Superior Nacional (BSN) in Puerto Rico for the Mayagüez Indios.

On August 5, 2020, Freeman signed with Šibenka of the Croatian League.

== Personal life ==
The son of James and Dr. Miriam Freeman, he has one sister, Shawna, and two brothers, Aric and Adrian. He majored in sport management.
