= Mustafa Abdul-Hamid =

American basketball player (born 1988)

Personal information
- Born: June 2, 1988 (age 38) St. Louis, Missouri, U.S.
- Listed height: 6 ft 2 in (1.88 m)
- Listed weight: 195 lb (88 kg)

Career information
- High school: Country Day (Ladue, Missouri)
- College: UCLA (2006–2010)
- NBA draft: 2010: undrafted
- Playing career: 2010–2014
- Position: Point guard

Career history
- 2010–2011: Hemofarm
- 2011: Lille
- 2011–2012: Krka
- 2012–2013: Oldenburg
- 2014: Hoops Club
- 2014: Artland Dragons

Career highlights
- Pac-10 All-Academic First Team (2010)

Sean Mustafa Abdul-Hamid (born June 2, 1988) is an American former professional basketball player.

== Early life & college career ==
Abdul-Hamid was a four-year varsity basketball letterwinner and three-time team captain at Mary Institute and St. Louis Country Day School. He was selected ABC League Player of the Year, first team All-League and second team All-State. He graduated with honors and a 3.95 GPA. He was a Signet Society member and a National Achievement Scholarship Semifinalist. He was also accepted into Harvard.

Abdul-Hamid played for the UCLA Bruins from 2006 to 2010.

== Professional career ==
In August 2010, Abdul-Hamid signed a one-year contract with Hemofarm from Serbia. However, in March 2011, he moved to France and signed with Lille for the rest of the 2010–11 season.

In December 2011, Abdul-Hamid signed with the Slovenian team Krka, but was released later that month. However, in February 2012, after the unexpected departure of Ben Hansbrough, Krka re-signed him until the end of the 2011–12 season.

In September 2012, Abdul-Hamid signed a two-month contract with Oldenburg of Germany, as a replacement for injured Chris Kramer. In February 2013, he was re-signed by the German team for the remainder of the 2012–13 season.

In January 2014, Abdul-Hamid signed with Hoops Club in Lebanon. In March 2014, he returned to Germany and signed with Artland Dragons for the rest of the season.

== Personal life ==
He is the son of Stephen Abdul-Hamid and Marva Williams. He has two younger brothers.
