= Teo Petani =

Croatian basketball player

Sonik-Puntamika
- Position: Point guard
- League: Croatian League

Personal information
- Born: March 2, 1988 (age 38) Zadar, SR Croatia, SFR Yugoslavia
- Listed height: 6 ft 3 in (1.91 m)
- Listed weight: 80 kg (176 lb)

Career information
- Playing career: 2008–present

Career history
- 2008–2011: Borik-Puntamika
- 2011–2012: Jolly Šibenik
- 2012–2013: Đuro Đaković
- 2013–2017: Šibenik
- 2017–2018: BK Levickí Patrioti
- 2018: Jazine Arbanasi
- 2018–present: Sonik-Puntamika

Teo Petani (born March 2, 1988) is a Croatian professional basketball player for Sonik-Puntamika of the Croatian League. Standing at 1.91 m (6 ft 3 in), he plays as a point guard. He was born in Zadar, to an Arbanasi family.
