= Tornado Zadar =

Croatia sports supporter group

- Nickname: Tornado
- Established: 1965
- Type: Supporters' group Ultras group
- Team: KK Zadar; NK Zadar
- Location: Zadar, Croatia
- Arena: Krešimir Ćosić Hall; Stadion Stanovi
- Colors: Blue, white

Tornado Zadar is a supporter group from Zadar, Croatia. They are mainly supporters of the KK Zadar basketball team. The official name of this civil association is in Croatian Udruga navijača Tornado Zadar, which translated means Civil association of the supporters Tornado Zadar. The association is registered with the Croatian NGO register under the number 13000768.

== History ==
Tornado Zadar has been organized since 1965. and is a second oldest supporters association in Croatia after Torcida Split with whom they are friends. The sixties and seventies were the golden age for the association, after which the enthusiasm of the members were slowly declining, the culmination of which happened in 1999, when the core of the association members retired, leaving the association for good.

The 2002 was essential for the association because the young generation of the supporters started to regroup and to refurbish the association.

== Activities ==
Association Tornado Zadar mostly supports basketball club KK Zadar, but also football club NK Zadar as well as other sport teams from Zadar. It is accustomed that any match of the KK Zadar is followed by a group of Tornado supporters. They don't have exact rivalry (although some see Šibenski funcuti group from Šibenik as their rivals) but they are at odds mostly with clubs from Zagreb, or internationally from Serbia and their respective ultras. Throughout the era of former Yugoslavia the tensions were high on matches with KK Crvena Zvezda.

In 2009. a book titled "Posljednja generacija istoka" was released, which deals with the supporters group. The book itself does not have a publisher, can not be bought from a book store, and only 300 copies were printed.

The group is known for the harsh and loud atmosphere they create on home venues, the state of the art Krešimir Ćosić Hall and run-down Stadion Stanovi. They have their own sections on those venues. In the old Jazine Basketball Hall they would be grouped mostly on the eastern stand.

The association doesn't have a direct political orientation, although they have sent some political messages; usually reflecting opinions of most inhabitants of Zadar.

The association is known for writing letters and press releases regarding their stand about the happenings in sport life in Croatia in general and in Zadar in particular.

Tornado Zadar was responsible for organizing fireworks show in 2011 for their basketball team KK Zadar a day before the big game to show their enormous support to their basketball team who was experiencing some bad luck on the play court. The city walls looked as if were "on fire".

In 2011 the association organized charity fundraising called "Let's help the family of Tihomir Purda". The aim of that humanitarian action was to financially help the family of the war veteran who was held in custody in Zenica on the basis of international arrest warrant issued by Serbian prosecution In 2012 Tornado Zadar supported humanitarian aid aiming at collecting financial support for the war veterans surviving with €19 per month. The members gave financial support as well as support in material things like hygiene products.

In 2023, during a basketball game against KK Crvena zvezda, the supporters chanted "Oh Croatian mother, we will slaughter the Serbs" and "Oh Croatia, oh Croatia, independent state" in reference to the mass slaughter of Serbs during WWII by the Croatian Ustaše. The match was also preceded by a hooligan attack and assault on a Serbian journalist and member of Crvena Zvezda board of directors.
