= 2000–01 Slovenian Basketball League =

- League: Slovenian Basketball League
- Sport: Basketball
- TV partner: RTV Slovenija

Regular season
- Season champions: Union Olimpija

Playoffs
- Finals champions: Union Olimpija
- Runners-up: Krka Telekom

Slovenian Basketball League seasons
- ← 1999–2000 2001–02 →

The 2000–01 Slovenian Basketball League, known as Liga Kolinska for sponsorship reasons, was the tenth season of the Premier A Slovenian Basketball League, the highest professional basketball league in Slovenia.

== Regular season ==
| Pos | Team | P | W | L | F | A | Pts |
| 1 | Union Olimpija | 32 | 30 | 2 | 3099 | 2128 | 62 |
| 2 | Krka Telekom | 32 | 27 | 5 | 2897 | 2520 | 59 |
| 3 | Geoplin Slovan | 32 | 19 | 13 | 2696 | 2610 | 51 |
| 4 | Pivovarna Laško | 32 | 19 | 13 | 2834 | 2796 | 51 |
| 5 | Rogla Zreče | 32 | 14 | 18 | 2722 | 2917 | 46 |
| 6 | Kraški zidar | 32 | 13 | 19 | 2410 | 2705 | 45 |

| Pos | Team | P | W | L | F | A | Pts |
| 7 | Helios Domžale | 32 | 16 | 16 | 2607 | 2569 | 48 |
| 8 | Kemoplast Alpos | 32 | 14 | 18 | 2805 | 2865 | 46 |
| 9 | Triglav Kranj | 32 | 14 | 18 | 2402 | 2536 | 46 |
| 10 | Zagorje Banka Zasavje | 32 | 11 | 21 | 2639 | 2839 | 43 |
| 11 | Savinjski Hopsi | 32 | 9 | 23 | 2566 | 2830 | 41 |
| 12 | Loka kava | 32 | 6 | 26 | 2502 | 2864 | 38 |

P=Matches played, W=Matches won, L=Matches lost, F=Points for, A=Points against, Pts=Points

| Qualified for the Playoff stage |

== Playoffs ==
Semi-finals
1 | Union Olimpija | 2
4 | Pivovarna Laško | 0
2 | Krka Telekom | 2
3 | Geoplin Slovan | 0

Final
1 | Union Olimpija | 3
2 | Krka Telekom | 0

Slovenian League 2000–2001
Champions
Union Olimpija
9th title
