= Vladimir Anzulović =

Croatian basketball player and coach

Dinamo
- Title: Head coach
- League: Croatian League

Personal information
- Born: 6 February 1978 (age 48) Zagreb, SR Croatia, SFR Yugoslavia
- Listed height: 1.86 m (6 ft 1 in)

Career information
- NBA draft: 2002: undrafted
- Playing career: 1996–2010
- Position: Point guard
- Coaching career: 2011–present

Career history

Playing
- 1996–1997: Kantrida Rijeka
- 1997–1999: Zrinjevac
- 1999–2000: Zagreb
- 2000–2002: Krka
- 2002: Anwil Włocławek
- 2002–2003: Krka
- 2003: MOL Szolnoki
- 2003–2004: Dubrava
- 2004–2005: Krka
- 2005: Debreceni
- 2005: Iraklis
- 2006–2007: Zadar
- 2007–2008: Kvarner Novi Resort
- 2008–2009: Verviers-Pepinster
- 2009: Hopsi Polzela
- 2009–2010: KK Rudar

Coaching
- 2011–2012: Krka (assistant)
- 2012–2014: Kvarner 2010
- 2014–2015: Director of youth program KK Krka+ Kolpa Črnomelj
- 2015–2016: Director of youth program + Krka (assistant)
- 2016: Krka
- 2016–2018: Šibenik
- Croatia U18 - head coach
- 2018: Croatia U18 - head coach
- 2018–2019: Split
- 2019: Croatia national basketball B TEAM - students team- head coach
- 2021–2022: Zadar
- 2022–2023: Tindastóll
- 2023: Dinamo
- 2023-2025: BC Zhejiang Golden Bulls

Career highlights
- As player: Croatian Cup winner (2007); As head coach: assistant coach winner (2012); Slovenian Cup -head coach winner (2016); Slovenian Cup -head coach winner (2016); Slovenian Cup -head coach winner (2016); Croatian Basketball Championship - head coach 1st place regular seaqson (2016); -head coach winner (2017); -head coach 2nd place (2022); CBA - consultant + assist coach 3rd place (2024)
Medals
Men's basketball
Representing Croatia
European U-18 Championship
| Gold medal – first place | 1996 France |

Vladimir Anzulović (born 6 February 1978) is a Croatian professional basketball coach and former player currently serving as a consultant and assistant coach for BC Zhejiang Golden Bulls of the Chinese Basketball Association - CBA.

== Playing career ==
Anzulović played pro basketball as a point guard from 1996 to 2010.

For the senior Croatia national team he played total 7 games (2 friendly, 5 officially). Anzulović played five official games at FIBA EuroBasket 2003 qualification, scoring total 22 points.

== Coaching career ==
Anzulović firstly worked in Slovenia as an assistant coach to coach Sekulic, together they become national champions in 2012. In June 2012 he become head coach of BC Kvarner 2010, he spent there 2 years, coaching youngest team in Croatia won 5th and 7th place in national championship. In August 2014 BC Krka hired him as chief of youth program. Season 2015-2016 he started as an assistant coach of first team, in January he become head coach and succeeds to win Slovenian Cup in the 2016.

In June 2016, he was hired as the head coach for Šibenik. In his inaugural season at the club, Šibenik won 1st place in the regular part of Croatian Championship, qualifying for Adriatic league, finishing on 2nd place, while in the next season, they won 5th place in Croatian championship with youngest team of the competition.

In the summer of 2017 he was head coach of Croatian National team U-18, won the European Championship, division B.In the summer of 2018 he coached Croatian National team U-18,11th place on European Championship, division A. On 29 May 2018, he was hired as the head coach for Split. In the summer of 2019, he coached the Croatia national team at the Universiade.

On 7 November 2019, Anzulović replaced Simon Petrov as the head coach of the Slovenian team Krka. On 17 March 2021, Krka parted ways with him.

On 23 October 2021, Zadar hired Anzulović as their new head coach. Team won 2nd place of Croatian Championship and reached the finals. He left after one season.

In July 2022, Anzulović was hired as the head coach of Úrvalsdeild karla club Tindastóll. He left the team in January 2023 due to financial problems.

In March 2023, Anzulović was named head coach of Dinamo of the Croatian Leaguereaching playoffs first time in club's history.

In May 2023 he was named as consultant and assistant coach of BC Zhejiang Golden Bulls of the Chinese Basketball Association -CBA. Season 2023-2024 they finished in 3rd place with score of 41-11. In the season 2024-2025 club won 9th place with score of 30-16.

In July 2025 was named head coach of KK Cedevita Junior but was fired in November 2025 due to bad results.

== Personal life ==
His older brother Dražen is also a basketball coach.
