= Lovre Bašić =

Croatian basketball player

Kvarner
- Position: Point guard
- League: Croatian Basketball League

Personal information
- Born: January 10, 1995 (age 31) Zadar, Croatia
- Listed height: 1.90 m (6 ft 3 in)
- Listed weight: 86 kg (190 lb)

Career information
- NBA draft: 2017: undrafted
- Playing career: 2012–present

Career history
- 2012–2019: Zadar
- 2019–2020: Vrijednosnice Osijek
- 2020–2021: Liège Basket
- 2021–2022: Jazine
- 2022: Posušje
- 2022: Široki
- 2022–2023: Alkar
- 2023: Nevėžis
- 2024–2025: Zabok
- 2025–2026: Golden Eagle Ylli
- 2026–present: Kvarner

Career highlights
- Stanković Cup winner (2018)
Medals
Men's basketball
Representing Croatia
European U-16 Championship
Gold medal – first place	2011 Czech Republic	U-16 Team

Lovre Bašić (born 10 January 1995) is a Croatian professional basketball player currently playing for Kvarner of the Croatian Basketball League. Standing at 1.90 m, he plays at the point guard position.

== Playing career ==
Bašić grew up playing as a point guard for Zadar of the Croatian League. On the beginning of the 2015–16 season he became the second youngest captain in history of the club, Giuseppe Gjergja being the only younger one in 1957.

In August, 2019, he moved to Vrijednosnice Osijek.

In May 2020, Bašić moved to Liège Basket of the Belgian League. He parted ways with the team on September 21, 2021.

In November, 2021, Bašić signed with Jazine, the development team of Zadar competing in the Croatian second-tier Prva muška liga. He averaged 12 points, 5.8 assists, 2.6 rebounds, and 1.4 steals per game.

On February 9, 2022, Bašić signed with HKK Posušje of the Basketball Championship of Bosnia and Herzegovina.

In August 2022, Bašić signed with another club from Herzegovina, Široki. In October 2022, Bašić reinjured his knee and was released from Široki.

In December, 2022, Bašić signed with Alkar of the Croatian League.

On 20 July 2023, Bašić signed with Nevėžis Kėdainiai of the Lithuanian Basketball League (LKL). On 13 December, he parted ways with the team.

In January, 2024, Bašić signed with Egis Körmend of the Hungarian League.

== National team career ==
Bašić played with the Croatia national team youth selections. With the Croatia national under-16 team, he played at the 2011 FIBA Europe Under-16 Championship where he won gold. He also played at the 2014 FIBA Europe Under-20 Championship where Croatia finished fourth.

Bašić debuted for the Croatia national B team at the 2018 Stanković Cup.
