= Ivan Blaće =

Croatian basketball player

Personal information
- Born: 1 July 1984 (age 42) Šibenik, SR Croatia, SFR Yugoslavia

Career information
- Playing career: 2005–2017
- Position: Forward

Career history
- 2005–2010: Šibenka Dalmare
- 2010–2017: Šibenik

Ivan Blaće (born 1 July 1984) is a Croatian former professional basketball player.

== Personal life ==
He was born in Šibenik in July 1984. In 2017, he married Croatian model Maja Spahija.
