= 1999–2000 Slovenian Basketball League =

- League: Slovenian Basketball League
- Sport: Basketball
- TV partner: RTV Slovenija

Regular season
- Season champions: Pivovarna Laško
- Season MVP: (Lithuania) Šarūnas Jasikevičius

Playoffs
- Finals champions: Krka Telekom
- Runners-up: Pivovarna Laško

Slovenian Basketball League seasons
- ← 1998–99 2000–01 →

The 1999–2000 Slovenian Basketball League, known as Liga Kolinska for sponsorship reasons, was the ninth season of the Premier A Slovenian Basketball League, the highest professional basketball league in Slovenia.

== Regular season ==
Pos	Team	P	W	L	F	A	Pts
1	Pivovarna Laško	32	30	2	2845	2345	62
2	Union Olimpija	32	28	4	2780	2023	60
3	Krka Telekom	32	22	10	2535	2312	54
4	Slovan	32	15	17	2342	2371	47
5	Savinjski Hopsi	32	14	18	2501	2563	46
6	Triglav Kranj	32	13	19	2329	2547	45

Pos	Team	P	W	L	F	A	Pts
7	Zagorje	32	17	15	2323	2455	49
8	Kraški zidar	32	12	20	2391	2458	44
9	Loka kava	32	12	20	2314	2475	44
10	Rogla Atras Zreče	32	11	21	2369	2525	43
11	Helios Domžale	32	11	21	2466	2692	43
12	ZM Maribor	32	7	25	2265	2694	39

P=Matches played, W=Matches won, L=Matches lost, F=Points for, A=Points against, Pts=Points

Qualified for the Playoff stage
Relegated to the Second league

== Playoffs ==
Semi-finals
1	Pivovarna Laško	2
4	Geoplin Slovan	0
2	Union Olimpija	0
3	Krka Telekom	2

Final
1	Pivovarna Laško	1
3	Krka Telekom	3

Slovenian League 1999–2000
Champions

Krka Telekom
1st title
