= Miralem Halilović =

Bosnian basketball player (born 1991)

No. 7 – Cholet Basket
- Position: Center
- League: LNB Élite; Champions League

Personal information
- Born: July 22, 1991 (age 35) Tuzla, SR Bosnia and Herzegovina; SFR Yugoslavia
- Listed height: 2.08 m (6 ft 10 in)
- Listed weight: 107 kg (236 lb)

Career information
- NBA draft: 2013: undrafted
- Playing career: 2007–present

Career history
- 2007–2010: Sloboda Dita
- 2010–2014: Zagreb
- 2014: Dzūkija
- 2015: Zagreb
- 2015: Krka
- 2015–2016: Zagreb
- 2016–2017: GKK Šibenik
- 2017–2020: Orléans Loiret
- 2020–2022: Metropolitans 92
- 2022–2023: Nanterre 92
- 2023–2024: Galatasaray Ekmas
- 2024–2025: Dinamo Sassari
- 2025–2026: Bosna
- 2026–present: Cholet Basket

Career highlights
- Croatian League champion (2011); Croatian Cup winner (2011); LNB Pro A All-Star (2019)

Miralem Halilović (born 22 July 1991) is a Bosnian professional basketball player for Cholet Basket of LNB Pro A. He is also the captain of the Bosnia and Herzegovina national basketball team. He plays at the power forward and center positions.

== Career ==
Miralem grew up with Sloboda Dita and went on to spend four seasons playing for Zagreb.

After three months spent at Lithuanian Dzūkija at the beginning of the 2014–15 season, he briefly returned to Zagreb and signed a three-month contract with Krka-Telekom in March 2015.

=== Zagreb ===
In July 2015, he returned to KK Zagreb, signing a contract for one season.

=== GKK Šibenik ===
In August 2016, he signed with GKK Šibenik.

=== Orléans Loiret Basket ===
In June 2017, he signed with French club Orléans Loiret Basket of the LNB Pro B.

=== Metropolitans 92 ===
On April 27, 2020, he signed with Metropolitans 92 of the LNB Pro A.

=== Nanterre 92 ===
On June 27, 2022, he signed with Nanterre 92 of the LNB Pro A.

=== Galatasaray Ekmas ===
On July 4, 2023, he signed with Galatasaray Ekmas of the Turkish Basketbol Süper Ligi (BSL).

=== Dinamo Sassari ===
On May 27, 2024, he signed with Dinamo Sassari of the Lega Basket Serie A (LBA).

=== Cholet Basket ===
On June 18, 2026, he signed with Cholet Basket of LNB Pro A.
