= Miro Jurić =

Croatian basketball player and coach

Šibenka
- Position: Assistant coach
- League: Croatian League

Personal information
- Born: 10 August 1972 (age 54) Šibenik, SR Croatia, SFR Yugoslavia
- Listed height: 1.96 m (6 ft 5 in)

Career information
- NBA draft: 1994: undrafted
- Playing career: 1990–
- Coaching career: 2010–present

Career history

Playing
- Šibenka
- Split CO
- KK Rijeka
- Široki
- Šibenka

Coaching
- 2010–2018: Šibenik (assistant)
- 2018–2019: Šibenka
- 2020–present: Šibenka (assistant)
Medals
Men's basketball
Representing Croatia
FIBA World Cup
| Bronze medal – third place | 1994 Canada | Team |
Representing Yugoslavia
European Championship for Cadets
| Silver medal – second place | 1989 Spain | Team |

Miro Jurić (born 10 August 1972) is a Croatian professional basketball coach and former player. He is an assistant coach for Šibenka of the Croatian League.

== National team career ==
Jurić was a member of the cadet Yugoslavia national team that won the silver medal at the 1989 European Championship in Spain.

He was also a member of the senior Croatia national team that won the bronze medal at the 1994 World Cup.

== Coaching career ==
=== Šibenka (2010–2019; 2020–present) ===
Following his retirement from playing professional basketball, Jurić was appointed assistant coach for Šibenka under the coaching staff of the head coach Jeronimo Šarin, in 2010, which role he took alongside Nenad Amanović and his former team-mate Petar Maleš.

On 11 May 2018, after the head coach Vladimir Anzulović parted ways with the club, Jurić was named his successor as the head coach at his hometown club. In his official head coaching debut, on 6 October, Jurić led the team to an 86–79 home win against Gorica.

On 2 November 2019, following a 111–77 away loss to Cibona in the Croatian League, he was sacked by the club.

On 24 June 2020, following the appointment of Dženan Rahimić as head coach for Šibenka, Jurić was named his assistant.
