= Fran Pilepić =

Croatian basketball player

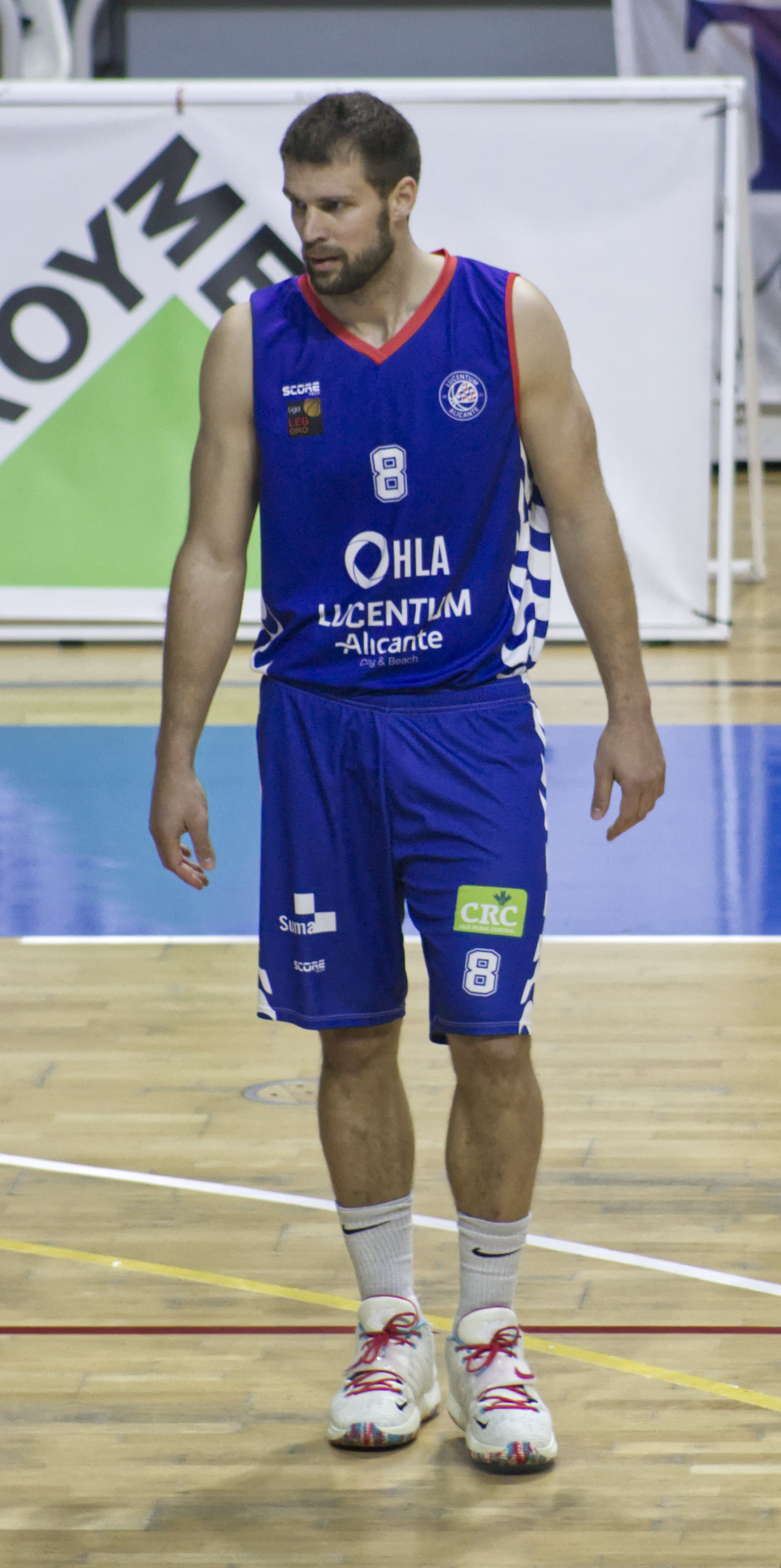

Personal information
- Born: May 5, 1989 (age 37) Rijeka, SR Croatia, SFR Yugoslavia
- Listed height: 6 ft 4 in (1.93 m)
- Listed weight: 190 lb (86 kg)

Career information
- NBA draft: 2011: undrafted
- Playing career: 2007–present
- Position: Shooting guard

Career history
- 2007–2008: Crikvenica
- 2008–2009: Kvarner
- 2009–2010: Svjetlost Brod
- 2010–2012: HKK Široki
- 2012–2014: Bilbao
- 2014–2016: Cedevita
- 2016–2017: Cantù
- 2017–2018: Selçuklu Belediyesi
- 2018: Lietkabelis
- 2018–2019: Cibona
- 2020–2023: Adria Oil Škrljevo
- 2021–2022: Lucentum Alicante
- 2022–2023: Club Ourense Baloncesto
- 2023–2024: Sanat Mes Rafsanjan
- 2024–2025: Kožuv

Career highlights
- 2× Bosnian League champion (2011, 2012); 3× Croatian League champion (2015, 2016, 2019); 2× Bosnian Cup winner (2011, 2012); 2× Croatian Cup winner (2015, 2016)

Fran Pilepić (born May 5, 1989) is a Croatian professional basketball player for Kožuv in the Macedonian League. Standing at 6 ft 4 in (1.93 m), he plays the shooting guard position.

== Professional career ==
On June 30, 2014, he signed a three-year deal with the Croatian team Cedevita. On July 25, 2016, he left Cedevita.

On August 28, 2016, he signed with Italian club Pallacanestro Cantù for the 2016–17 season.

In August 2017, he signed with Selçuklu Belediyesi of the Turkish Basketball Second League.

In August 2018, he signed with the Lithuanian Lietkabelis.

In December 2018, he signed with the Croatian Cibona.

In December 2020, after a year and a half long break during which he was dealing with a back problem, Pilepić signed for Adria Oil Škrljevo of the Croatian League.

== Euroleague career statistics ==
Legend
GP	Games played	GS	Games started	MPG	Minutes per game
FG%	Field-goal percentage	3P%	3-point field-goal percentage	FT%	Free-throw percentage
RPG	Rebounds per game	APG	Assists per game	SPG	Steals per game
BPG	Blocks per game	PPG	Points per game	PIR	Performance index rating
**Bold**	Career high

Year	Team	GP	GS	MPG	FG%	3P%	FT%	RPG	APG	SPG	BPG	PPG	PIR
2014–15	Cedevita	10	**10**	**23.4**	.516	**.532**	**1.000**	**1.4**	**1.5**	**.6**	.0	**11.7**	**9.3**
2015–16	Cedevita	**22**	1	17.6	**.529**	.484	**1.000**	1.3	.9	.4	**.1**	6.4	4.8
Career		32	11	19.4	.523	.505	1.000	1.3	1.1	.4	.0	8.1	6.2
