= Domagoj Šarić =

Croatian basketball player

No. 5 – Šibenka
- Position: Point guard
- League: Croatian League

Personal information
- Born: April 15, 1999 (age 27) Šibenik, Croatia
- Listed height: 6 ft 4 in (1.93 m)

Career information
- NBA draft: 2021: undrafted
- Playing career: 2014–present

Career history
- 2014–present: Šibenka
Medals
Men's basketball
Representing Croatia
FIBA Europe U18 Championship B
Gold medal – first place	2017 Estonia	National U-18 Team
FIBA Europe Under-20 Championship
Silver medal – second place	2018 Germany	U-20 Team

Domagoj Šarić (born 4 April 1999) is a Croatian professional basketball player who currently plays for Šibenka of the Croatian League. Šarić also plays for the Croatia men's national under-19 basketball team.

In 2014 Šarić signed with GKK Šibenka where he has played a total of 37 games over three season averaging 3.7 points per game in just 6.7 minutes per game.
