= 1997–98 Slovenian Basketball League =

- League: Slovenian Basketball League
- Sport: Basketball
- TV partner: RTV Slovenija

Regular season
- Season champions: Union Olimpija

Playoffs
- Finals champions: Union Olimpija
- Runners-up: Kovinotehna Savinjska Polzela

Slovenian Basketball League seasons
- ← 1996–97 1998–99 →

The 1997–98 Slovenian Basketball League was the seventh season of the Premier A Slovenian Basketball League, the highest professional basketball league in Slovenia.

== Regular season ==
Pos	Team	P	W	L	F	A	Pts
1	Union Olimpija	28	26	2	2423	1609	54
2	Pivovarna Laško	28	23	5	2385	1951	51
3	Kovinotehna Savinjska	28	19	9	2369	2039	47
4	Krka	28	18	10	2270	2055	46
5	ZM Maribor Ovni	28	15	13	1984	2050	43
6	Postojna	28	13	15	2102	2273	41
7	Slovan	28	13	15	2006	2053	41
8	Helios Domžale	28	12	16	2035	2160	40
9	Kraški zidar	28	12	16	2081	2270	40
10	Pošta Maribor Branik	28	10	18	1980	2127	38
11	Idrija	28	6	22	1995	2341	34
12	Krško	28	1	27	1899	2601	29

P=Matches played, W=Matches won, L=Matches lost, F=Points for, A=Points against, Pts=Points

Qualified for the Playoff stage
Relegated to the Second league

== Playoffs ==
Quarterfinals
1	Union Olimpija	2
8	Kraški zidar	0
4	Krka	2
5	ZM Maribor Ovni	1
2	Pivovarna Laško	2
7	Slovan	0
3	Kovinotehna Savinjska	2
6	Postojna	0

Semifinals
1	Union Olimpija	2
4	Krka	0
2	Pivovarna Laško	1
3	Kovinotehna Savinjska	2

Finals
1	Union Olimpija	3
3	Kovinotehna Savinjska Polzela	0

Slovenian League 1997–98
Champions
Union Olimpija
7th title
