= 1998–99 Slovenian Basketball League =

- League: Slovenian Basketball League
- Sport: Basketball
- TV partner: RTV Slovenija

Regular season
- Season champions: Union Olimpija

Playoffs
- Finals champions: Union Olimpija
- Runners-up: Pivovarna Laško

Slovenian Basketball League seasons
- ← 1997–98 1999–2000 →

The 1998–99 Slovenian Basketball League, known as Liga Kolinska for sponsorship reasons, was the eighth season of the Premier A Slovenian Basketball League, the highest professional basketball league in Slovenia.

== Regular season ==
Pos	Team	P	W	L	F	A	Pts
1	Union Olimpija	32	29	3	2738	2060	61
2	Pivovarna Laško	32	27	5	2848	2317	59
3	Krka	32	23	9	2602	2343	55
4	Savinjski Hopsi	32	20	12	2513	2342	52
5	ZM Lumar Maribor^{1}	32	13	19	2508	2627	45
6	Loka kava	32	11	22	2226	2555	43

Pos	Team	P	W	L	F	A	Pts
7	Slovan	32	14	18	2504	2468	46
8	Postojna	32	13	19	2296	2543	45
9	Triglav Kranj	32	11	21	2277	2426	43
10	Kraški zidar	32	11	21	2271	2467	43
11	Pošta Maribor Branik^{1}	32	11	21	2308	2573	43
12	Helios Domžale	32	9	23	2268	2638	41

P=Matches played, W=Matches won, L=Matches lost, F=Points for, A=Points against, Pts=Points

Qualified for the Playoff stage
Withdrew from competition

^{1}ZM Lumar merged with Branik after the season.

== Playoffs ==
Semi-finals
1	Smelt Olimpija	2
4	Savinjski Hopsi	1
2	Pivovarna Laško	2
3	Krka	1

Final
1	Smelt Olimpija	3
2	Pivovarna Laško	0

Slovenian League 1998–99
Champions
Union Olimpija
8th title
