= Mauro Veljačić =

Croatian basketball player

Personal information
- Born: June 22, 1993 (age 33) Crikvenica, Croatia
- Listed height: 1.83 m (6 ft 0 in)

Career information
- Playing career: 2009–present
- Position: Guard

Career history
- 2009–2012: KK Crikvenica
- 2012–2017: Kvarner 2010
- 2017–2018: Nevėžis
- 2018–2019: Split

Mauro Veljačić (born 22 June 1993) is a Croatian former professional basketball player.
