= Filip Kraljević =

Croatian basketball player

No. 47 – KK Dinamo
- Position: Center
- League: Premijer liga Alpe Adria Cup

Personal information
- Born: December 13, 1989 (age 36) Mostar, SR Bosnia and Herzegovina, Yugoslavia
- Listed height: 2.13 m (7 ft 0 in)

Career information
- NBA draft: 2011: undrafted
- Playing career: 2007–present

Career history
- 2007–2009: Cibona
- 2007–2009: → Rudeš
- 2009–2012: Cedevita
- 2009–2010: → Mladost
- 2010–2011: → Zabok
- 2012: → Zabok
- 2012–2013: Split
- 2013–2016: Zadar
- 2016–2017: CAI Zaragoza
- 2017–2018: Zadar
- 2018: Cibona
- 2019–2021: Široki
- 2021: Zadar
- 2021–2022: HydroTruck Radom
- 2022–2023: Široki
- 2023–present: KK Dinamo

Career highlights
- Croatian League champion (2021); Croatian Cup winner (2021)

Filip Kraljević (born December 13, 1989) is a Croatian professional basketball player for KK Dinamo of the Premijer liga and the Alpe Adria Cup. He plays the center position.

== Playing career ==
Kraljević started playing basketball at the age of 16 in his hometown Široki Brijeg. Shortly after, he moved to the Cibona junior team. The first two years of his senior career he spent on a loan in Rudeš in the A-2 League. At the age of 20 he signs with Cedevita but spends most of his contract on loan in their reserve team Mladost (A-2 League) and in Zabok (A-1 Liga). In the Summer of 2012 he signs with Split where he spent one season after which he signed with Zadar.

In August 2016, Kraljević leaves Croatia to sign with Spanish club CAI Zaragoza. In January 2021, he signed with Zadar for his third stint with the club.

In August, 2021, Kraljević signed with HydroTruck Radom of the and the Polish League.

In August 2022, Kraljević returned to Široki, signing a two-year contract.

== National team career ==
Kraljević was part of the Croatian national team at the 2009 FIBA Europe Under-20 Championship. He was part of the preliminary Croatian national squad for the 2016 FIBA World Olympic Qualifying Tournament in Turin but did not make the final roster.
