= Jazine Basketball Hall =

Indoor arena in Croatia

Coordinates: 44°6′39″N 15°13′59″E

- Dvorana Jazine
- Interactive map of Jazine Basketball Hall
- Location: Zadar, Croatia
- Owner: City of Zadar
- Capacity: 3,500

Construction
- Opened: 1968; 52 years ago

Tenants
- Jazine Arbanasi; Sonik-Puntamika

Jazine Basketball Hall (Croatian: Dvorana Jazine) is an indoor sports arena located in Jazine, Zadar, Croatia. The official seating capacity of the arena is 3,500 people.

== History ==
It was opened in 1968 after a construction period of 70 days. It was home of the KK Zadar basketball team until 2008. Tornado Zadar usually positioned itself on eastern stand.
