= Damir Milačić =

Croatian basketball player and coach

Prishtina
- Title: Head coach
- League: Kosovo Basketball Superleague

Personal information
- Born: 25 February 1975 (age 51) Slavonski Brod, SR Croatia, SFR Yugoslavia
- Listed height: 1.84 m (6 ft 0 in)

Career information
- Playing career: 1992–2010
- Position: Point guard
- Coaching career: 2009–present

Career history

Playing
- 1992–1999: Zagreb
- 1999–2000: Union Olimpija
- 2000–2001: Hopsi Polzela
- 2001–2002: Zadar
- 2002–2004: Verviers-Pepisnter
- 2004–2005: Spirou Charleroi
- 2005–2006: Pivovarna Laško
- 2006: Racing Antwerp
- 2006–2008: Cedevita
- 2008–2009: U-Mobitelco Cluj-Napoca
- 2009–2010: Fortuna Zaprešić

Coaching
- 2009–2012: Susedgrad Moslavina
- 2012–2015: Croatia U20
- 2012–2015: Alkar
- 2015–2016: Jolly Šibenik
- 2016–2017: Alkar
- 2017–2018: Kangoeroes Willebroek
- 2019–2021: Alkar
- 2021–2024: Šibenik
- 2024–2025: Peja
- 2025–present: Prishtina

Damir Milačić (pronounced [dǎːmir ˈmilat͡ʃit͡ɕ]; born 25 February 1975) is a Croatian professional basketball coach and former player who is currently the head coach of Prishtina in the Kosovo Basketball Superleague. Standing at 1.84 m (6 ft 0 in), he played as point guard in his career, and also represented the Croatian national team. In 2012 Milačić turned to coaching, starting at Alkar.
