= Ivan Siriščević =

Croatian basketball player

Vienna
- Position: Small forward / shooting guard
- League: Austrian Basketball Superliga

Personal information
- Born: April 30, 1987 (age 39) Split, SR Croatia, SFR Yugoslavia
- Listed height: 1.98 m (6 ft 6 in)
- Listed weight: 88 kg (194 lb)

Career information
- NBA draft: 2007: undrafted
- Playing career: 2003–present

Career history
- 2003–2008: Split
- 2008–2010: Široki Primorka
- 2010–2011: Kecskeméti
- 2011–2012: Timișoara
- 2012–2013: Oberwart Gunners
- 2013–2014: Split
- 2014–2015: Cibona
- 2015: Mitteldeutscher BC
- 2015–2016: Cibona
- 2016–2017: Šibenik
- 2017–2018: SCM CSU Craiova
- 2018–2019: BCM U Pitesti
- 2019–2020: Zadar
- 2020–2021: Solin
- 2021–present: Vienna

Career highlights
- Croatian Cup winner (2020)

Ivan Siriščević (born 30 April 1987) is a Croatian professional basketball player currently playing for BC Vienna of the Austrian Basketball Superliga.
