= Edi Dželalija =

Croatian basketball coach (born 1969)

Personal information
- Born: November 28, 1969 (age 56) Šibenik, SR Croatia, SFR Yugoslavia
- Position: Head coach
- Coaching career: 1991–present

Career history

Coaching
- 1991–1992: Šibenka (assistant)
- 1993–1998: Triglav Osiguranje Rijeka (juniors)
- 1998–2003: Triglav Osiguranje Rijeka (assistant)
- 2003–2006: Svjetlost Brod
- 2003–2004: Croatia (assistant)
- 2004–2006: Croatia U18
- 2006–2007: Široki
- 2008–2009: Svjetlost Brod
- 2009–2010: KK Rudar
- 2010–2011: KK Kraljevica
- 2011–2013: Jolly JBS Šibenik (women)
- 2013–2014: Tajfun Šentjur
- 2015–2016: Amal Essaouira
- 2017–2018: BC Razmi
- 2018–2019: Kuwait
- 2019–2020: Šibenka
- 2020–2021: Peja, Kosovo
- 2021–2022: Al Arabi, Kuwait
- 2023–2024: Depolink,Škrljevo, Croatia
- 2024–2025: Al Arabi, Kuwait: Croatian Coach of the Year (2012)

Edi Dželalija (pronounced [ědi džèlalȉjā]; born November 28, 1969) is a Croatian professional basketball coach.

== Coaching career ==
=== First years ===
Born in Šibenik, Dželalija graduated from the Rijeka Faculty od Kinesiology and the Faculty of Economics. In 1991, he started his professional basketball coaching career with Šibenka, where he worked as an assistant coach to Anđelko Matov. Later, he worked five years as junior team head coach and five years as assistant coach of Rijeka-based team Triglav Osiguranje.

=== Svjetlost Brod and Croatia (2003–2006) ===
In 2003, Dželalija was appointed head coach of Svjetlost Brod, which he led to the Final Four of the Croatian Championship.

After he worked as an assistant coach to Neven Spahija at the 2003 EuroBasket, Dželalija took over Croatia national under-18 team in 2004 and led them at the 2005 FIBA Europe Under-18 Championship, winning eleventh place, and at the 2006 FIBA Europe Under-18 Championship, winning tenth place.

=== Jolly JBS Šibenik (2011–2013) ===
In 2011, he was appointed head coach for Jolly Šibenik, a women's club from his hometown. In inaugural season, the club reached semifinals of the Croatian Championship and Dželalija won the Croatian Coach of the Year award in 2012. Later, he led Tajfun Šentjur from Slovenia, Amal Essaouira from Morocco, BC Razmi from Georgia, while from 2018 to 2019, he worked as head coach of the Kuwait national team.

=== Šibenka (2019–2020) ===
On 4 November 2019, Dželalija was appointed head coach of Šibenka. In his debut, he led the club to a 74–81 loss to Zadar.

On 24 June 2020, after the expiration of the contract, Dželalija did not renew it and left Šibenka.

== Style of coaching ==
During his presentation as new head coach at Šibenka, he emphasized that he wants and prefers fast, modern and, for spectators, attractive basketball. With his ability and experience, he has particularly distinguished himself as head coach of the Kuwait national team between 2018 and 2019.
