= GKK Šibenka =

Šibenka
- Nickname: Građani (The Citizens); Narančasti (The Oranges)
- Leagues: First League
- Founded: 2 November 2010; 15 years ago
- History: KK Šibenik Stari Grad (2010–2011); GKK Šibenik (2011–2019); GKK Šibenka (2019–present)
- Arena: Baldekin Sports Hall
- Capacity: 900
- Location: Šibenik, Croatia
- Team colors: Orange and Black
- Head coach: Anđelko Matov
- Championships: 1 First League
- Website: sibenka.hr
Home	Away

Građanski košarkaški klub Šibenka, commonly referred to as GKK Šibenka or simply Šibenka, is a men's professional basketball club from Šibenik, Croatia, that plays in the second-tier First League. The club considers itself a successor to notable and folded KK Šibenik.

On 9 April 1983, Šibenka and Bosna played the deciding game 3 of their national league playoff final series that was decided in the last second: with Bosna up by a point and the clock winding down as Šibenka had the last possession, Bosna's Sabit Hadžić was adjudged to have fouled Šibenka's Dražen Petrović as he went up for a shot at the buzzer. Since being in the act of shooting, Petrović got two free throws and proceeded to score both, winning the game and championship for his team. Next morning, the Basketball Federation of Yugoslavia (KSJ) presidency reviewed the game on account of supposed refereeing irregularities. They decided to void the result, ordering a rematch in Novi Sad. Šibenka decided to boycott the decision. Since Šibenka failed to show up for the Novi Sad game, the title got awarded to Bosna.

== History ==
The club was founded on 2 November 2010 under the name of Šibenik Stari Grad (English: Šibenik Old Town). In August 2011, the club changed its name to GKK Šibenik. As famous club, KK Šibenik, bankrupted, GKK Šibenik competed with local Jolly Šibenik to become most popular basketball club in town, carrying the legendary club's colors and playing in the same basketball hall, Baldekin. GKK Šibenik won the sympathies of many Šibenik residents who now see the club as a successor to the famous KK Šibenik.

In 2012–13 season of the second-tier A-2 Liga, the club came first being promoted to the A-1 League. Today, they also plays in the first tier of the Croatian basketball league system, HT Premijer liga. In September 2016, the club management announced replacing Jeronimo Šarin with Vladimir Anzulović as head coach, and signing Miralem Halilović, Ive Ivanov, Luka Pandurić, and Ivan Siriščević. Lastly, the club finished in third in the domestic league season, defeating Zagreb in the playoffs quarter-finals, and losing to powerhouse, Cibona, in the semifinals of the 2016–17 A-1 League playoffs. In the next season, the club finished in fifth place after losing in the quarter-finals of the championship playoffs to Split. Head coach Anzulović left bench, which was taken by his former assistant, Miro Jurić.

On 13 June 2019, after domestic league season was finished, a longtime main sponsor, Doğuş Group, announced that they will leave the club after six years of the partnership. On 27 June, the club confirmed and presented newly formed board led by its president, Ante Burić. On 6 August, the club management announced the club has changed name to GKK Šibenka (Građanski košarkaški klub Šibenka fully; English: Šibenka Citizens' Basketball Club).

== Home arena ==
Šibenka plays their home games at the Baldekin Sports Hall, which is located in Šibenik. The arena was opened in 1973. It has a seating capacity of 900 or 1,726 if needed.

== Honours ==
=== Domestic competitions ===
- First Men's League

Winners (1): 2012–13

== Players ==
=== Current roster ===
GKK Šibenka roster
Players
Coaches

Pos.	No.	Nat.	Name	Ht.	Wt.
PG	5	(Croatia)	Šarić, Domagoj	1.92 m (6 ft 4 in)		27 – 15 April 1999
G	6	(Croatia)	Živković, Ivan	1.96 m (6 ft 5 in)		24 – 22 January 2002
SG	8	(Croatia)	Gulin, Ivan	1.96 m (6 ft 5 in)		24 – 9 November 2001
SG	9	(Croatia)	Bašić, Domagoj (C)	1.95 m (6 ft 5 in)		40 – 25 March 1986
C	13	(Croatia)	Solomun, Bruno	2.06 m (6 ft 9 in)	98 kg (216 lb)	29 – 27 June 1997
PG	20	(Croatia)	Klarin, Antonio	1.85 m (6 ft 1 in)		23 – 17 April 2003
SG	24	(Croatia)	Pleadin, Juraj	1.93 m (6 ft 4 in)		23 – 10 April 2003
SF	25	(Croatia)	Vlaić, Marko	1.98 m (6 ft 6 in)		26 – 25 June 2000
C	44	(Croatia)	Jurković, Valentin	2.09 m (6 ft 10 in)	100 kg (220 lb)	32 – 10 January 1994
G		(Croatia)	Andabaka, Kristijan	1.95 m (6 ft 5 in)	93 kg (205 lb)	29 – 30 July 1997
PG		(United States)	Freeman, Trey	1.91 m (6 ft 3 in)	84 kg (185 lb)	33 – 12 October 1992
PF		(Montenegro)	Miković, Milija	2.05 m (6 ft 9 in)	107 kg (236 lb)	32 – 25 March 1994
SF		(Croatia)	Širko, Henrik	1.98 m (6 ft 6 in)	94 kg (207 lb)	33 – 23 February 1993
C		(Croatia)	Vraneš, Ivan	2.06 m (6 ft 9 in)		30 – 25 May 1996

Head coach

- (Croatia) Anđelko Matov

Assistant coach(es)

- (Croatia) Miro Jurić

Physiotherapist(s)

- (Croatia) Slaven Periša

Legend

- (C) Team captain
- Injured

- Roster

=== Depth chart ===
Pos.	Starting 5	Bench 1	Bench 2	Bench 3
C	Valentin Jurković	Bruno Solomun	Ivan Vraneš
PF	Milija Miković
SF	Henrik Širko	Marko Vlaić
SG	Ivan Gulin	Domagoj Bašić	Juraj Pleadin	Trey Freeman
PG	Ivan Živković	Kristijan Andabaka	Domagoj Šarić	Antonio Klarin

== Head coaches ==
- (Croatia) Jeronimo Šarin (2010–2016)
- (Croatia) Vladimir Anzulović (2016–2018)
- (Croatia) Miro Jurić (2018–2019)
- (Croatia) Edi Dželalija (2019–2020)
- (Croatia) Dženan Rahimić (2020–2021)
- (Croatia) Damir Milačić (2021–present)

== Management ==
Current staff
- President: (Croatia) Ante Nakić
- Vice-president: (Croatia) Ivan Baranović
- Members of the Board of Directors: (Croatia) Ivica Žurić; (Croatia) Krešimir Lokas; (Croatia) Nikola Grubić
- Team manager: (Croatia) Krešo Baljkas
- Business director: (Croatia) Damir Grandeš

Source: Board of Directors

== Notable players ==
- (Croatia) Roko Badžim
- (Croatia) Domagoj Bašić
- (Croatia) Ivan Blaće
- (Croatia) Filip Bundović
- (Montenegro) Vladimir Dašić
- (Greece) Georgios Diamantakos
- (Croatia) Nikola Došen
- (United States) Trey Freeman
- (Croatia) Tomislav Gabrić
- (Bosnia and Herzegovina) Miralem Halilović
- (Croatia) Ive Ivanov
- (Croatia) Martin Junaković
- (Croatia) Franko Kaštropil
- (Montenegro) Nikola Korač
- (Montenegro) Milija Miković
- (Croatia) Ivan Mileković
- (Croatia) Ozren Mišić
- (Croatia) Toni Nakić
- (Croatia) Teo Petani
- (Croatia) Krešimir Radovčić
- (Croatia) Ivan Siriščević
- (Croatia) Nik Slavica
- (Croatia) Ljubo Šamadan
- (Croatia) Henrik Širko
- (Turkey) İzzet Türkyılmaz
- (Croatia) Toni Vitali
- (Croatia) Jakov Vladović
- (Croatia) Zoran Vrkić
- (Croatia) Filip Vukičević

== See also ==
- KK Šibenik
- ŽKK Šibenik
