= KK Krka =

Basketball club in Novo Mesto, Slovenia

Krka
- Leagues: Slovenian First League; ABA League
- Founded: 1948; 78 years ago
- History: KK Novo mesto Partizan (1948–1963); KK Novoteks (1963–1992); KK Novo mesto 1992 (1992–1997); KK Krka (1997–present)
- Arena: Leon Štukelj Sports Hall
- Capacity: 2,500
- Location: Novo Mesto, Slovenia
- Team colors: Green, white
- Main sponsor: Krka d. d.
- President: Nejc Koračin
- General manager: Jure Balažić
- Head coach: Domen Zevnik
- Team captain: Blaž Mahkovic
- Championships: 7 National Championships; 4 National Cups; 6 Slovenian Supercups; 1 EuroChallenge; 2 ABA League Second Divisions
- Website: basketkrka.si
Home	Away

Košarkarski klub Krka (English: Basketball Club Krka), commonly referred to as KK Krka or simply Krka, is a Slovenian professional basketball team based in Novo Mesto that competes in the Slovenian First League and the ABA League. They play their home games at Leon Štukelj Sports Hall. The club is a founding member and shareholder of the Adriatic Basketball Association.

== History ==
=== 1948–2002 ===
The first basketball club in Novo Mesto was founded in 1948. In 1983, the club won its first Slovenian national championship. After that, however, basketball saw a decline in Novo Mesto that lasted until the Slovenian independence in 1991. Soon, the team was climbing through the lower divisions and earned a promotion to the Slovenian First League in 1997, when it also took the name of its sponsor, Krka. A fourth-place finish in the national league allowed the club to qualify for the Korać Cup for the 1998–99 season. The big breakthrough came a year later, however, as Krka defeated historical rival Olimpija in the Slovenian championship finals to win the national title. That year, the team also played in the Saporta Cup. In 2000–01, Krka lost to Olimpija in the national league finals. In 2001–02, Krka qualified for the EuroLeague. Though Krka missed the Top 16, it was able to defeat all its opponents once, including Real Madrid, Panathinaikos, CSKA Moscow, and Skipper Bologna. At home, Krka finished as the runners-up in the Adriatic League, in the Slovenian Championship, and the national cup, losing to Olimpija on all three occasions.

=== 2002–2010 ===
Krka zoomed to the 2003 ULEB Cup double finals, narrowly losing to Pamesa Valencia despite being the only ULEB Cup team to win in Valencia. Krka won their second Slovenian championship, beating Olimpija in the finals.

Zoran Martić resigned during the 2003–04 season after poor results in the Euroleague, and was replaced by Petar Skansi. Krka finished the Euroleague with only two wins. In the Adriatic League and the Slovenian League, Krka finished in 7th place. A loss against Helios Domžale in the quarterfinals meant relegation from the Adriatic League. The 2005–06 season was one of the worst in the club's history after Krka finished in last place after the regular season. In the relegation group, Krka finished 9th and avoided the drop. In the 2007–08 season, Krka finished third in the domestic league and replaced Geoplin Slovan in the Adriatic League. Krka was one of three Slovenian clubs representing Slovenia in the regional Adriatic League in the 2008–09 season, finishing in 11th place. In 1. SKL Krka finished third.

Aleksandar Džikić became head coach of the club for the 2009–10 season. Finishing first after the regular part of the season and second in the championship group, the team qualified for the semifinals. They then defeated Helios 2–1 in the series, reaching the finals for the first time since 2003. Krka defeated Olimpija 3–2 in the final and won the national title.

=== 2010–11 season: National and Eurochallenge champions ===
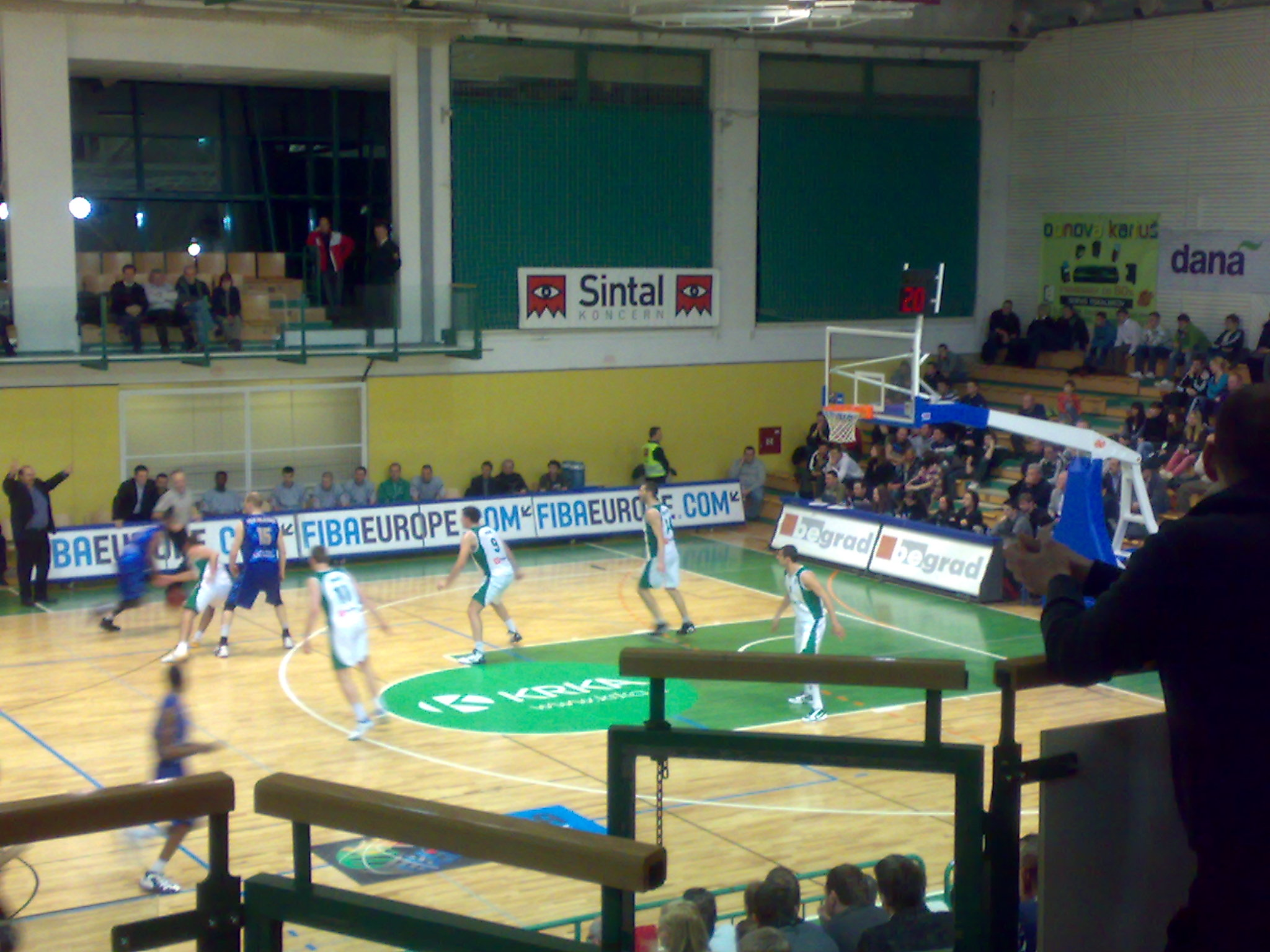
Eurochallenge game

Aleksandar Džikić was confirmed as head coach for the 2010–11 season. He got a new assistant coach for help, Aleksander Sekulić. Krka qualified for Adriatic League and decided to compete in the third-rank European league called FIBA EuroChallenge. The season started with a win in the Slovenian Supercup, beating Olimpija in Maribor. Krka qualified for Adriatic League Final 4, where they lost against Olimpija in the semifinals. They also made it to the EuroChallenge Final 4 where they won the club's first European trophy, beating Oostende in the semifinal and Lokomotiv-Kuban in the final. They finished the Slovenian League in first place with one loss. In the semifinals Krka defeated Zlatorog Laško 2–0. The successful season ended on 11 June when Krka won the Slovenian League after beating Olimpija 3–2 in the final, thus winning their fourth national title and the second in a row.

=== 2011–12 season: back to EuroCup, national champions ===
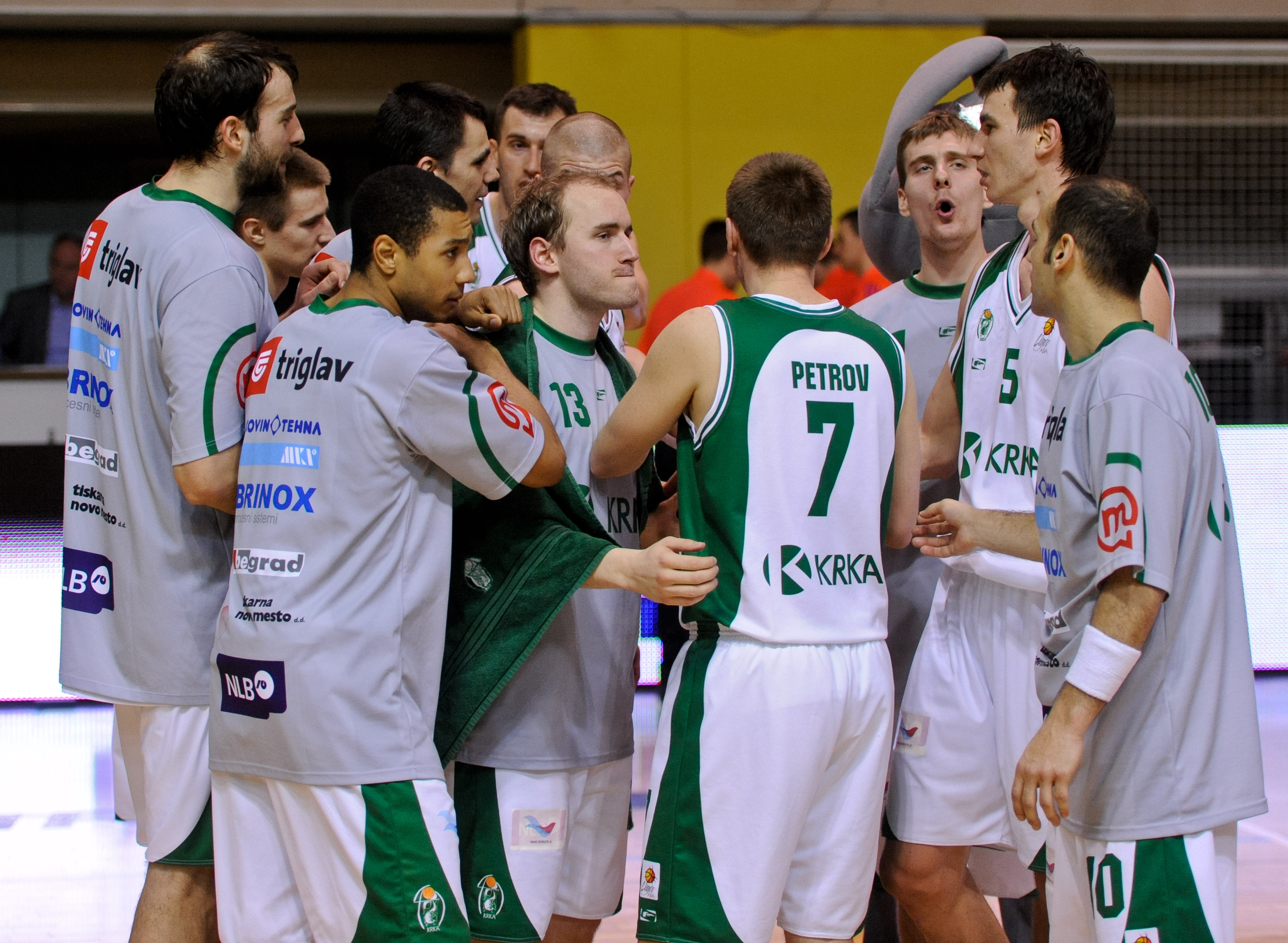
Krka team in 2012

Krka competed in the ABA league, Eurocup, Slovenian Cup, and Slovenian Telemach League. Coach Aleksandar Džikić was replaced with Nenad Trajković. Dušan Đorđević, Goran Ikonić, Dragiša Drobnjak and Chris Booker has left the club. Their replacements were Jaka Klobučar, Curtis Stinson, Marko Đurković, Jimmy Baxter, and Jerome Jordan. The club had two players on the Slovenian national team, Edo Murić and Zoran Dragić. Krka had successfully started a season in October, winning Slovenian Supercup over Olimpija. In November, Jaka Klobučar and Curtis Stinson left the club. Klobučar's wish was to play in a foreign country, while Stinson went to surgery (broken ankle). Krka bought Allan Ray who played only three games. After an excellent performance against Le Mans, he moved to France. His replacement was Mustafa Abdul-Hamid.

On 1 December, coach Trajković moved to the Phoenix Suns and was replaced with his assistant Sekulić. Also, Jerome Jordan left the club (NBA-out clause), along with Jimmy Baxter (denied documents) and Marko Đurković (poor performances). On 29 December Krka announced three new players, Ben Hansbrough from Bayern München, Uroš Lučić from Radnički Kragujevac, who already played for Krka in the 2009–10 season and Jure Lalić, who came from Cibona. In January 2012, the club released Mustafa Abdul-Hamid, but after one month he came back to the club in February 2012. The club also announced a new player on PG position. That became Afik Nissim. The season ended with winning their fifth national championship, the third in a row.

=== 2012–13 season: return to Eurochallenge ===
The club competed in the ABA league, Slovenian Telemach League, EuroChallenge and Slovenian Cup. After winning the national trophy in the previous season, Sekulić continued as the main coach. New assistant coach became Gašper Potočnik and former Krka player Simon Petrov. Club signed Jaka Klobučar, Jakov Vladović and Jurica Golemac and two youngsters, Erjon Kastrati and Tomaž Bolčina. Jure Balažić changed clubs and went to Turkey while Simon Petrov retired and became an assistant coach. Krka started the season with a Slovenian Supercup win over Olimpija (84–81) on 25 September in Grosuplje. On 30 December, Matjaž Smodiš and president Brane Kastelec announced his comeback to his home club. Due to bad results, especially defeat in the semifinals of the national cup against Helios on 11 February, main coach Sekulić was released. Gašper Potočnik became a new head coach, who was previously an assistant. In March, Krka signed combo guard Jerime Anderson, who played his first game in the national championship against Helios. In the championship, Krka finished the regular season in first place with only one defeat (9–1). In the semifinals, the team won 2–0 against Zlatorog Laško and advanced to the finals against Olimpija, where Krka won the series 3–1, clinching its fourth consecutive title and sixth overall. The last game had a huge contribution from Matjaž Smodiš who scored 21 points and successfully ended his career.

=== 2013–14 season: Džikić comeback ===
On 18 June 2013, Krka signed a two-year contract with Aleksandar Džikić. The first team addition was Jasmin Hukić, signed on 25 June. Club added Croatian power forward Zvonko Buljan and Slovenian guard Luka Lapornik on 12 July.

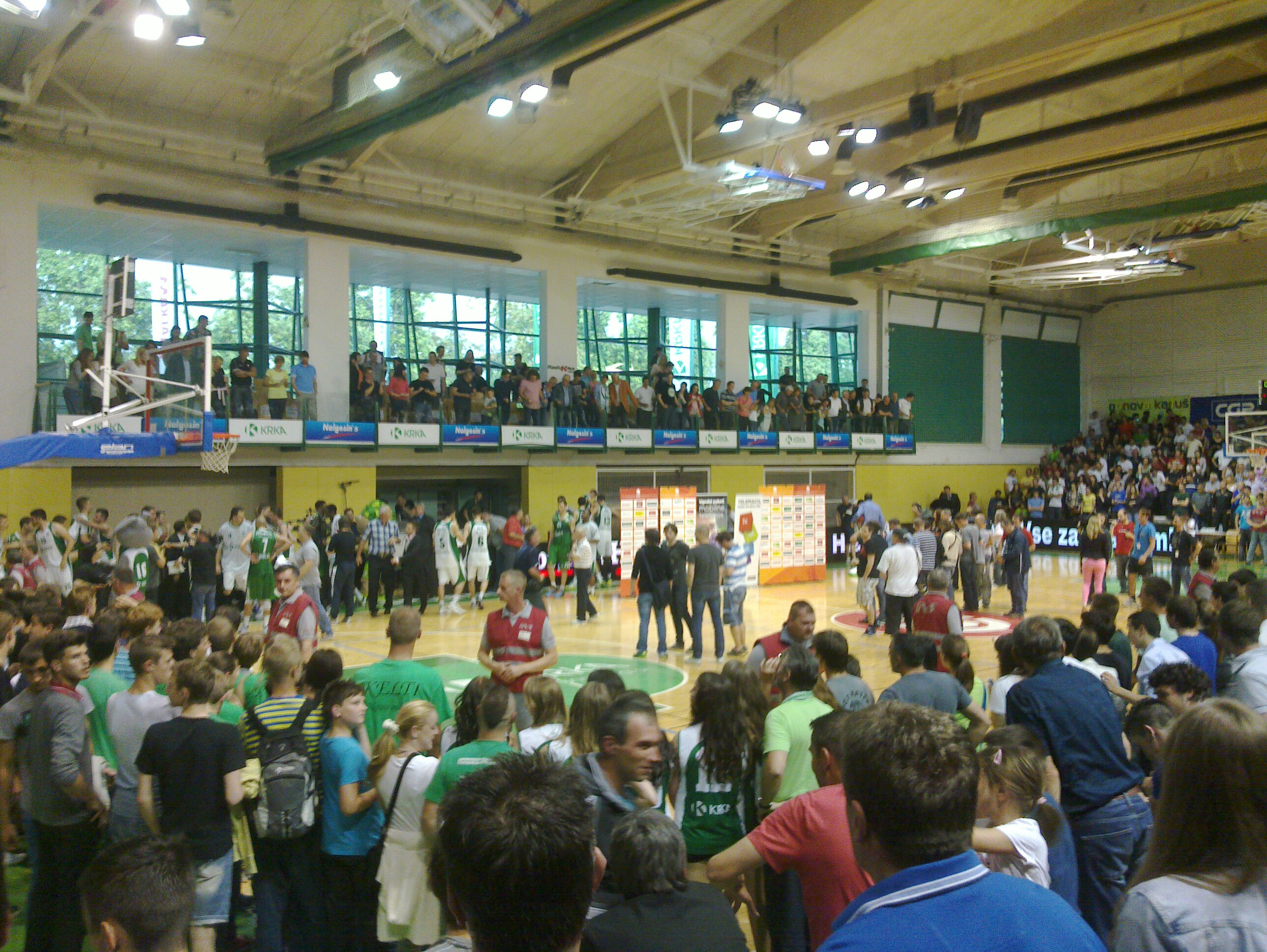
National title winners in 2014

On 24 July, the club announced the signing of Derrick Nix on a three-year contract, but because of his improper behavior, they terminated his contract and signed Chris Booker instead. American PG Malcolm Armstead joined the club on 30 July. In the middle of the season, Sani Bečirović, a Slovenian international, joined the team. 2013–14 was the first season in which Krka won the national cup and after winning the national championship in May 2014, Krka won their first "double crown" in the history of the club. Jaka Klobučar was awarded the Slovenian League MVP title. Krka finished in seventh place in the Adriatic League, just a spot away from directly qualifying for EuroCup.

=== 2014–15 season: Cup winners, semifinals of the national championship ===
On 14 June, two new players were confirmed, Cameroonian Alexis Wangmene and Mirko Mulalić, while Smiljan Pavič, Jaka Klobučar, Sani Bečirović, Zvonko Buljan, Marko Pajić, and Edo Murić have left the club. Aleksandar Džikić kept his place as head coach. On 26 June 2014, ULEB decided that Krka can not play in its hall, resulting in an absence from the European competitions for the first time in four years. Krka eventually played in the Slovenian and ABA league. On 9 July, Krka signed a one-year contract with former Slovenian national team player Nebojša Joksimović. In July, Krka announced that Christopher Booker decided to come back to Novo Mesto and extended his contract. Before the start of the season, Krka won the Slovenian Supercup against Olimpija. The ABA League season started with a 5–1 record, but it was followed by nine defeats in the next ten games. In January, a new five-win streak started and in February, the team won its second national cup against Zlatorog Laško. After eight defeats in the regular season of the Slovenian League, Krka finished first in the championship round (8–2). After the quarterfinal win against Portorož in the playoffs (2–0), the team was eliminated in the semifinals by Tajfun.

=== 2015–present ===
On 21 June 2015, Ivan Velić was hired as a new head coach. Vladimir Anzulović became a new assistant coach, previously head coach of KK Kolpa Črnomelj.

In the next few seasons, Krka struggled in the Slovenian League, getting eliminated in the semifinals in 2016 and 2017. Krka made the finals in 2018 but lost to Olimpija. In 2016, Krka also won the Slovenian Cup and Slovenian Supercup. Krka also struggled in the Adriatic League, and were relegated to the newly established ABA League Second Division for the 2017–18 season. In their first ABA Second Division season, Krka qualified for the 2018 ABA League Second Division Final Four, which they won by beating Borac Čačak in the semifinals and Primorska in the final. Marko Jošilo was named the MVP of the finals, and Krka was promoted back to the Adriatic League first division.

== Arena ==
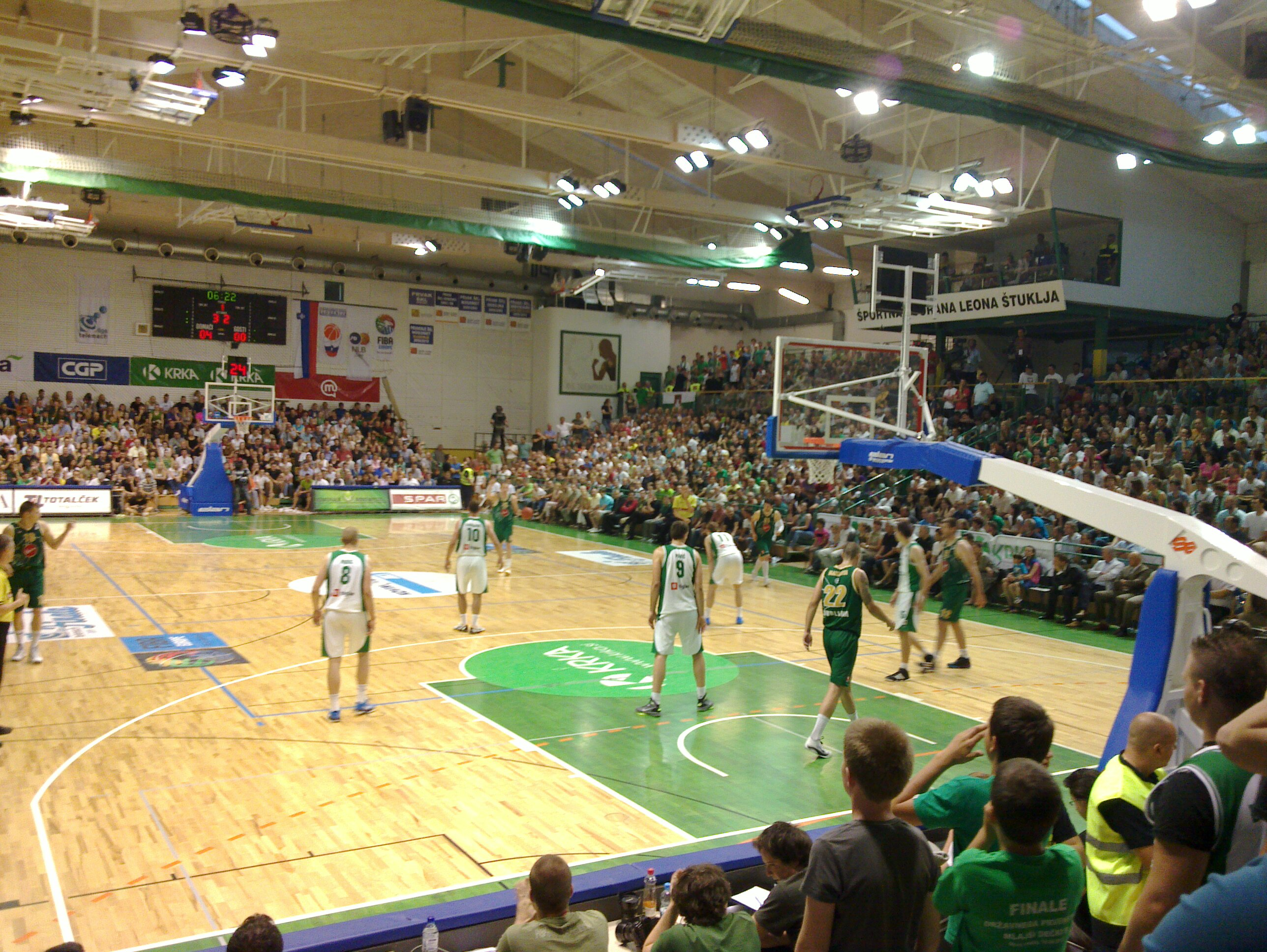
Fifth game of the Slovenian League finals in 2011, showing Leon Štukelj Sports Hall from the southeast side

The first ground of the club was an outdoor asphalt playground called Loka, near the river Krka. In the 1970s, Krka moved to the first indoor arena in Novo Mesto, named Marof. It has a capacity of 1,500 spectators. Marof was the home court of Krka for over 30 years and is still being used as a training court. The 2009–10 season playoff finals were also played in Marof.

Today, Krka play their home games at Leon Štukelj Sports Hall with a capacity of 2,500 seats, located in the school center in the southwestern part of Novo Mesto. It is the town's primary sports gym and is the venue for many events, as it is the largest hall in Novo Mesto and Lower Carniola.

A new arena with around 5,000 seats was planned for EuroBasket 2013 in Slovenia, but the project was cancelled as well as Novo Mesto's bid for EuroBasket.

== Current roster ==
=== Squad information ===
Note: Flags indicate national team eligibility at FIBA-sanctioned events. Players may hold other non-FIBA nationalities not displayed.

KK Krka roster
Players
Coaches

Pos.	No.	Nat.	Name	Ht.	Age
G	2	(Slovenia)	Jazon Krošelj	1.89 m (6 ft 2 in)	18 – 20 September 2008
G	5	(United States)	Diante Baldwin	1.85 m (6 ft 1 in)	32 – 17 October 1994
SG	6	(Slovenia)	Timotej Balažić	1.97 m (6 ft 6 in)	18 – 8 March 2008
G	7	(Slovenia)	Jon Dolničar	1.83 m (6 ft 0 in)	21 – 16 December 2004
PF	8	(Slovenia)	Lenart Sirc	2.03 m (6 ft 8 in)	22 – 17 December 2003
G	9	(Serbia)	Đorđe Božić	1.98 m (6 ft 6 in)	25 – 15 February 2001
F	10	(Slovenia)	Urban Oman	1.98 m (6 ft 6 in)	27 – 2 December 1998
PF	11	(Slovenia)	Uroš Šikanić	2.02 m (6 ft 8 in)	24 – 16 December 2001
F	17	(Slovenia)	Jaka Klobučar	2.02 m (6 ft 8 in)	23 – 27 March 2003
F	21	(Slovenia)	Blaž Mahkovic (C)	2.01 m (6 ft 7 in)	36 – 21 March 1990
PF	23	(United States)	Naje Smith	2.01 m (6 ft 7 in)	26 – 5 April 2000
C	30	(United States)	Galin Smith	2.07 m (6 ft 9 in)	27 – 29 December 1998
SG	31	(Slovenia)	Jan Rebec	1.92 m (6 ft 4 in)	33 – 28 September 1993

Head coach

- (Slovenia) Domen Zevnik

Assistant coach(es)

- (Slovenia) Tin Hvalec
- (Croatia) Leon Stipaničev
- (Slovenia) Matic Šiška

Strength & conditioning coach(es)

- (Slovenia) Gašper Šoln

Physiotherapist(s)

- (Slovenia) Davorin Matković

Legend

- (C) Team captain
- Injured

- Roster
Updated: 27 September 2026

== Season-by-season records ==
Key

- 3R = Third round
- R32 = Round of 32
- GS = Group stage
- RS = Regular season
- RU = Runners-up
- C = Champions
- L16 = Last 16

Season	Tier	Domestic league	Pos	Domestic cup	Supercup	Adriatic League		European competitions	
1992–93	4	4. League	1st			—N/a			
1993–94	3	3. League (2. SKL)	6th			—N/a			
1994–95	3	3. League (2. SKL)	1st			—N/a			
1995–96	2	2. League (A2)	2nd			—N/a			
1996–97	2	2. League (A2)	1st			—N/a			
1997–98	1	1. A SKL	4th	Third place		—N/a			
1998–99	1	Liga Kolinska	3rd	Quarterfinals		—N/a		3 Korać Cup	3R
1999–00	1	Liga Kolinska	1st	Third place		—N/a		2 Saporta Cup	R32
2000–01	1	Liga Kolinska	2nd	Runners-up		—N/a		1 SuproLeague	GS
2001–02	1	HYPO Liga	2nd	Runners-up		Runners-up		1 Euroleague	RS
2002–03	1	1. A SKL	1st	Quarterfinals		7th place		2 ULEB Cup	RU
2003–04	1	1. A SKL	5th	Quarterfinals	Runners-up	7th place		1 Euroleague	RS
2004–05	1	1. A SKL	6th						
2005–06	1	1. A SKL	9th						
2006–07	1	Liga UPC Telemach	6th	Semifinals					
2007–08	1	Liga UPC Telemach	3rd	Semifinals					
2008–09	1	Liga UPC Telemach	3rd	Semifinals		11th place			
2009–10	1	Telemach League	1st	Semifinals					
2010–11	1	Telemach League	1st	Quarterfinals	Winners	Semifinals		3 EuroChallenge	C
2011–12	1	Telemach League	1st	Runners-up	Winners	11th place		2 Eurocup	L16
2012–13	1	Telemach League	1st	Semifinals	Winners	9th place		3 EuroChallenge	RS
2013–14	1	Telemach League	1st	Winners	Runners-up	7th place		3 EuroChallenge	L16
2014–15	1	Telemach League	3rd	Winners	Winners	9th place			
2015–16	1	Liga Nova KBM	3rd	Winners	Runners-up	12th place		3 Europe Cup	R32
2016–17	1	Liga Nova KBM	3rd	Runners-up	Winners	14th place			
2017–18	1	Liga Nova KBM	2nd	Semifinals	Runners-up	Second Division	C		
2018–19	1	Liga Nova KBM	4th	Quarterfinals		First Division	10th		
2019–20	1	Liga Nova KBM	can.	Semifinals		First Division	can.		
2020–21	1	Liga Nova KBM	2nd	Winners	Runners-up	First Division	12th		
2021–22	1	Liga Nova KBM	4th	Semifinals	Runners-up	First Division	14th		
2022–23	1	Liga Nova KBM	3rd	Quarterfinals		Second Division	C		
2023–24	1	Liga Nova KBM	3rd	Runners-up		First Division	14th		
2024–25	1	Liga OTP banka	2nd	Runners-up	Runners-up	First Division	14th		
2025–26	1	Liga OTP banka	2nd	Runners-up	Runners-up	First Division	13th		

== Honours ==
=== Domestic competitions ===
- Slovenian League

Champions (7): 1999–2000, 2002–03, 2009–10, 2010–11, 2011–12, 2012–13, 2013–14
Runners-up (6): 2000–01, 2001–02, 2017–18, 2020–21, 2024–25, 2025–26

- Slovenian Cup

Winners (4): 2014, 2015, 2016, 2021
Runners-up (7): 2001, 2002, 2012, 2017, 2024, 2025, 2026

- Slovenian Supercup

Winners (6): 2010, 2011, 2012, 2014, 2016, 2026
Runners-up (8): 2003, 2013, 2015, 2017, 2020, 2021, 2024, 2025

=== European competitions ===
- ULEB Cup

Runners-up: 2002–03

- FIBA EuroChallenge

Winners: 2010–11

=== Regional competitions ===
- Adriatic League

Runners-up: 2001–02

- ABA League Second Division

Winners (2): 2017–18, 2022–23

== List of head coaches ==
- (Croatia) Živko Ljubojević (1997–1999)
- (Croatia) Ivan Sunara (1999–2000)
- (Slovenia) Aleš Pipan (2000–2001)
- (Croatia) Neven Spahija (2001–2003)
- (Slovenia) Zoran Martič (2003)
- (Slovenia) Slavko Kovačevič (interim) (2003)
- (Croatia) Petar Skansi (2003–2004)
- (Slovenia) Slavko Kovačevič (2004)
- (Federal Republic of Yugoslavia) Predrag Jaćimović (interim) (2004)
- (Federal Republic of Yugoslavia) Predrag Milović (2004–2005)
- (Croatia) Leon Stipaničev (2005)
- (Federal Republic of Yugoslavia) Predrag Milović (2005–2007)
- (Slovenia) Rade Mijanović (2007–2008)
- (Croatia) Ivan Sunara (2008–2009)
- (Serbia) Aleksandar Džikić (2009–2011)
- (Serbia) Nenad Trajković (2011)
- (Slovenia) Aleksander Sekulić (2011–2013)
- (Slovenia) Gašper Potočnik (2013)
- (Serbia) Aleksandar Džikić (2013–2015)
- (Bosnia and Herzegovina) Ivan Velić (2015–2016)
- (Croatia) Vladimir Anzulović (2016)
- (Slovenia) Dejan Mihevc (2016–2017)
- (Slovenia) Simon Petrov (2017–2019)
- (Croatia) Vladimir Anzulović (2019–2021)
- (Slovenia) Dalibor Damjanović (2021–2022)
- (Slovenia) Gašper Okorn (2022–2024)
- (Slovenia) Dejan Jakara (2024–2026)
- (Slovenia) Domen Zevnik (2026–present)
