= KK Jazine =

KK Jazine Arbanasi
- League: First Men's Basketball League
- Arena: Jazine Basketball Hall
- Capacity: 3,000
- Location: Zadar, Croatia
- Head coach: Marko Selin
- Team captain: Ante Beljan
- Championships: 1 First League

Košarkaški klub Jazine Arbanasi, also known as KK Jazine Arbanasi or simply Jazine Arbanasi, is a men's professional basketball club based in Zadar, Croatia. It competes in the second-tier First League.

The club plays home matches in the Jazine Basketball Hall, sometimes in the Krešimir Ćosić Hall. The club competed for a number of years in the First Men's Basketball League, but for the 2016–17 season it was promoted to the top HT Premijer liga.

Since September, 2020, the club is officially the development team of KK Zadar.

== Notable players ==
- (Croatia) Pankracije Barać
- (Croatia) Teo Petani
- (Croatia) Juraj Segarić

== Honours ==
Domestic league

- A-2 Liga: 2016–17
