= KK Sonik-Puntamika =

KK Aleta Puntamika
- Leagues: Croatian League
- Founded: 1974
- History: 1974–present
- Arena: Jazine Basketball Hall (Capacity: 3,500)
- Location: Zadar, Croatia
- Team colors: White, green
- President: (Croatia) Miro Dundov
- Head coach: (Croatia) Jakov Vladović
- Championships: 1 Prva Muška Liga
Home	Away

KK Aleta Puntamika is a Croatian professional basketball team from the city of Zadar. The club currently plays in the HT Premijer liga.

== History ==
Košarkaški klub Puntamika founded in 1974, and the first match was played on the concrete playground at School of Economics. Game against KK Stanovi, a team that game was led by Tomo Mičić, the first unofficial coach Puntamika. In early 1976 under the guidance of coach Zdenko Užović, the club moves to the first official competition - Zadar Municipal League. Already in the first performance in the local league Borik has overwhelmingly won first place in the next championships earned the right to play in a higher class of competition, the A-group basketball league of northern Dalmatia.

In the 1982–83 season club is played in basketball league in Croatia - South Group, Borik won first place for the first time in its history became a champion of Dalmatia. That same year, won the Cup of Dalmatia. In Dalmatian championship 1983-84 again were the best. At the next Cup in season 1984–85. were included in the newly unified republic under a new division called "Borik - Kompas," under which they played two seasons with a lot of success. Twice they were junior champions Yugoslavia. For the first time in Domžale at year 1987, and again in Zadar at 1988 year.

In 1990 the club's original name was returned Puntamika, formed a club basketball school, and from season 1990-91 Puntamika played in the southern group of HKL's. In the 1992–93 season club is received award from Croatian Basketball Federation for the most established club, a championship finish in third place. In the 1994–95 season, Puntamika provided playing in Croatian basketball Championship. From 2009–10 season, the club president is Mirko Jošić.
