= KK Kvarner 2010 =

- Leagues: Super Sport Premijer liga
- Founded: 2010 (Merger of KK Torpedo and KK Jadran)
- Arena: Dvorana Dinko Lukarić
- Capacity: 1,100
- Location: Rijeka, Croatia
- Team colors: Blue and White
- President: Luka Ivančić
- Head coach: Slaven Rimac
Home	Away

Košarkaški klub Kvarner 2010 (English: Kvarner 2010 Basketball Club) is a professional basketball club based in Rijeka. It competes in the highest basketball league in Croatia.

== History ==
The club was founded in 2010 by a merger of two clubs from Rijeka, KK Torpedo and KK Jadran. Although they share the same name and much of the legacy, the new club is not to be confused with the old Kvarner. The original KK Kvarner was founded in 1946, and its greatest success was the final of the Yugoslav Basketball Cup in 1976–77 and 1980–81. Historically, the club played in the Yugoslav First Basketball League for six seasons in total: in 1974–75, 1976–79, 1980–81 and 1982–83. Their top finish was eighth in 1976–77. During its history, the club has changed its name to Istravino, Croatia Line, Sava Osiguranje and Triglav Osiguranje. The club finished third in 2000–01 season and fourth in the 2001–02 season of Croatia's A-1 Liga, and participated in the inaugural season of the regional ABA League. The original Kvarner produced some well known Croatian basketball players, including the 1992 Summer Olympics silver medalist Aramis Naglić, Davor Kus, Fran Pilepić, Ivo Nakić and Marino Baždarić. In the last several years of its history, the club was called Kvarner Novi Resort. In 2009, the original Kvarner ceased functioning due to high debt that could not be serviced.
