= 2011–12 Slovenian Basketball League =

1. A SKL
- Season: 2011–12
- Duration: 15 October 2011 – 3 March 2012
- Teams: 10 + 2
- TV partner: RTV Slovenija

Regular season
- Top seed: Helios Domžale
- Season MVP: (United States) Travis Nelson

Finals
- Champions: Krka Novo Mesto; 5th title
- Runners-up: Union Olimpija
- Semifinalists: Helios Domžale; Zlatorog Laško
- Finals MVP: (Israel) Afik Nissim

Statistical leaders
Points	(United States) Travis Nelson	21.8
Rebounds	(Serbia) Miloš Miljković	8.6
Assists	(Slovenia) Luka Rupnik	5.4

The 2011–12 Telemach League was the 21st season of the Premier A Slovenian Basketball League, the highest professional basketball league in Slovenia. The first half of the season consisted of 10 teams and the 90-game regular season (18 games for each of the 10 teams) began on Friday, 15 October 2011 and ended on 3 March 2012. The second half of the season consisted of 2 teams from the Adriatic League and the best 6 teams from the first half of the season.

== Teams for the 2011–12 season ==
Team	City	Arena	Capacity	Head coach
Elektra	Šoštanj	Šoštanj Sport Hall	600	Gašper Potočnik
Geoplin Slovan	Ljubljana	Kodeljevo Sports Hall	1,540	Gašper Okorn
Helios	Domžale	Komunalni center Hall	2,500	Zmago Sagadin
Hopsi	Polzela	Polzela Sport Hall	1,800	Jernej Kobale
Krka*	Novo Mesto	Leon Štukelj Hall	2,800	Nenad Trajković
LTH Castings Mercator	Škofja Loka	Poden Hall	500	–
Maribor	Maribor	Tabor Hall	3,261	Slobodan Rmuš
Olimpija*	Ljubljana	Arena Stožice	12,500	Sašo Filipovski
Parklji	Ljubljana	ŠRC Ježica	300	Tone Corel
Rogaška Crystal	Rogaška Slatina	II. OŠ Rogaška Slatina	800	Matej Bakšič
Šentjur	Šentjur	Hruševec Sports Hall	450	Damjan Novaković
Zlatorog	Laško	Tri Lilije Hall	2,500	Rado Trifunović

Teams from the Adriatic League

Telemach League 2011–12 club Locations

== Regular season ==
=== A League standings ===
Pos	Team	P	W	L	F	A	Pts
1	Helios Domžale	18	16	2	1478	1263	34
2	Zlatorog Laško	18	13	5	1403	1225	31
3	Elektra	18	12	6	1251	1153	30
4	Šentjur	18	12	6	1485	1399	30
5	Maribor	18	10	8	1381	1276	28
6	Hopsi Polzela	18	9	9	1346	1352	27
7	Rogaška Crystal	18	8	10	1219	1257	26
8	Geoplin Slovan	18	7	11	1320	1359	25
9	LTH Castings Mercator	18	2	16	1171	1386	20
10	Parklji Ljubljana	18	1	17	1171	1555	19

P=Matches played, W=Matches won, L=Matches lost, F=Points for, A=Points against, Pts=Points

Qualified for the Champions stage

=== Stats Leaders ===
Statistic	Player	Team	Average
Ranking per game	(United States) Travis Nelson	Šentjur	21.81
Points per game	(United States) Travis Nelson	Šentjur	17.75
Rebounds per game	(Bosnia and Herzegovina) Esmir Rizvić	Parklji Ljubljana	9.25
Assists per game	(Slovenia) Luka Rupnik	Geoplin Slovan	5.41
Steals per game	(Slovenia) Miha Fon	Geoplin Slovan	2.00
Blocks per game	(United States) Travis Nelson	Šentjur	1.25

== Champions standings ==
Pos	Team	Total					
		P	W	L	F	A	Pts
1	Krka	10	8	2	763	646	18
2	Olimpija	10	7	3	680	641	17
3	Helios Domžale	10	6	4	769	739	16
4	Zlatorog Laško	10	5	5	667	686	15
5	Elektra	10	4	6	678	730	14
6	Šentjur	10	0	10	719	834	10

P=Matches played, W=Matches won, L=Matches lost, F=Points for, A=Points against, Pts=Points

Qualified for the Playoff stage

== Relegation league ==
Pos	Team	P	W	L	F	A	Pts
1	Hopsi Polzela	28	16	10	2199	2076	46
2	Maribor	28	18	10	2182	1970	46
3	Rogaška Crystal	28	13	15	1962	1944	41
4	Geoplin Slovan	28	12	16	2096	2123	40
5	LTH Castings Mercator	28	5	23	1866	2111	33
6	Parklji Ljubljana	28	1	27	1751	2409	29

P=Matches played, W=Matches won, L=Matches lost, F=Points for, A=Points against, Pts=Points

Relegated

== Playoffs ==
Semi-finals
1	Krka	2
4	Zlatorog Laško	0
2	Olimpija	2
3	Helios Domžale	0

Final
1	Krka	3
2	Olimpija	1

== Finals ==
TV SLO 2

17 May
8:00 pm

Report

Krka 65, Olimpija 76
Scoring by quarter: 8–18, 18–15, 14–15, 25–28
Pts: Jure Lalić 13; Rebs: Jure Lalić 10; Asts: Bojan Krivec 4	Pts: Jaka Blažič 15; Rebs: Blažič, Dašić 8 each Asts: Jan Močnik 4

Leon Štukelj Hall, Novo Mesto
Attendance: 2,000
Referees: Matej Boltauzer, Damir Javor, Sašo Petek

TV SLO 2

20 May
7:30 pm

Report

Olimpija 65, Krka 75
Scoring by quarter: 19–20, 15–19, 16–18, 15–18
Pts: Jaka Blažič 20; Rebs: Sasu Salin 6 Asts: Sasu Salin 3	Pts: Zoran Dragić 15; Rebs: Zoran Dragić 8 Asts: Krivec, Dragić, Nissim 3 each

Arena Stožice, Ljubljana
Attendance: 4,000
Referees: Saša Pukl, Roman Kolar, Mario Majkič

TV SLO 2

22 May
6:45 pm

Report

Krka 72, Olimpija 63
Scoring by quarter: 12–16, 23–13, 21-13, 16–21
Pts: Afik Nissim 17; Rebs: Smiljan Pavič 9 Asts: Afik Nissim 6	Pts: Deon Thompson 22; Rebs: Goran Jagodnik 7 Asts: Sasu Salin 5

Leon Štukelj Hall, Novo Mesto
Attendance: 2,400
Referees: Saša Pukl, Damir Javor, Andrej Lovšin

TV SLO 2

24 May
6:45 pm

Report

Olimpija 55, Krka 67
Scoring by quarter: 18–16, 16–17, 14–14, 7–20
Pts: Deon Thompson 18; Rebs: Jagodnik, Dašić 5 each Asts: Močnik, Jeretin 2 each	Pts: Afik Nissim 18; Rebs: Jure Lalić 7 Asts: Zoran Dragić 5
Krka wins Slovenian League Finals series, 3–1

Arena Stožice, Ljubljana
Attendance: 4,100
Referees: Matej Boltauzer, Sašo Petek, Mario Majkič

Telemach League 2011–12
Champions

Krka
5th title

== Awards ==
=== Regular season MVP ===
- (United States) Travis Nelson (Šentjur)

=== Season MVP ===
- (United States) Travis Nelson (Šentjur)

=== Finals MVP ===
- (Israel) Afik Nissim (Krka)

=== Weekly MVP ===
==== Regular season ====
Week	MVP	Club	Efficiency
1	(United States) Travis Nelson	Šentjur	25
2	(Slovenia) Salih Nuhanović	Elektra Šoštanj	28
3	(Bosnia and Herzegovina) Esmir Rizvić	Parklji	27
4	(Serbia) Miloš Miljković	Rogaška Crystal	28
5	(Croatia) Igor Marić	Šentjur	31
6	(Slovenia) Sanel Bajramlić	Elektra Šoštanj	23
7 ^{c}	(Croatia) Igor Marić (2)	Šentjur	31
7 ^{c}	(Croatia) Drago Pašalić	Helios Domžale	31
8 ^{c}	(Croatia) Alen Blesić	Rogaška Crystal	26
8 ^{c}	(Serbia) Ivan Držić	Šentjur	26
8 ^{c}	(Croatia) Ante Đugum	Slovan	26
9 ^{c}	(Slovenia) Klemen Prepelič	Helios Domžale	24
9 ^{c}	(Bosnia and Herzegovina) Esmir Rizvić (2)	Parklji	24
10	(Slovenia) Salih Nuhanović (2)	Elektra Šoštanj	27
11	(United States) Travis Nelson (2)	Šentjur	27
12	(Slovenia) Boban Tomić	Rogaška Crystal	30
13	(Uzbekistan) Dmitry Sviridov	Hopsi Polzela	25
14	(United States) Travis Nelson (3)	Šentjur	33
15	(United States) Travis Nelson (4)	Šentjur	31
16	(Croatia) Igor Marić (3)	Šentjur	27
17	(Slovenia) Klemen Prepelič (2)	Helios Domžale	29
18	(Slovenia) Boban Tomić (2)	Rogaška Crystal	31

Note

^c – Co-MVP's were announced.

==== Second round ====
Week	MVP	Club	EFF
1	(Slovenia) Boban Tomić	Rogaška Crystal	30
2	(Croatia) Ante Đugum	Slovan	29
3 ^{c}	(Serbia) Đorđe Lelić	Elektra Šoštanj	26
3 ^{c}	(Serbia) Vladimir Panić	Zlatorog Laško	26
4	(Slovenia) Blaž Mahkovic	LTH Castings Mercator	30
5	(Slovenia) Luka Rupnik	Slovan	34
6	(Slovenia) Klemen Prepelič	Helios Domžale	39
7 ^{c}	(Slovenia) Zoran Dragić	Krka Novo Mesto	26
7 ^{c}	(Uzbekistan) Dmitry Sviridov	Hopsi Polzela	26
8	(Slovenia) Erjon Kastrati	LTH Castings Mercator	25
9	(Slovenia) Ilija Gavrić	Maribor Messer	29
10	(Slovenia) Jaka Blažič	Union Olimpija	32

== Statistics leaders ==
=== Performance Index Rating ===
Pos	Player	Club	PIR
1	(United States) Travis Nelson	Šentjur	20.88
2	(Slovenia) Boban Tomić	Rogaška Crystal	17.11
3	(Slovenia) Marko Pajić	Slovan	15.43

=== Points ===
Pos	Player	Club	PPG
1	(United States) Travis Nelson	Šentjur	17.46
2	(Slovenia) Klemen Prepelič	Helios Domžale	16.70
3	(Slovenia) Boban Tomić	Rogaška Crystal	15.75

=== Rebounds ===
Pos	Player	Club	RPG
1	(Serbia) Miloš Miljković	Rogaška Crystal	8.57
2	(Croatia) Ante Đugum	Slovan	8.18
3	(Slovenia) Marko Pajić	Slovan	7.39

=== Assists ===
Pos	Player	Club	APG
1	(Slovenia) Luka Rupnik	Slovan	5.33
2	(United States) Patrick Rembert	Šentjur	5.14
3	(Slovenia) Dejan Hohler	Hopsi Polzela	4.44
