= 2012–13 Slovenian Basketball League =

1. A SKL
- Season: 2012–13
- Duration: 20 October 2012 – 20 May 2013
- Teams: 12
- TV partner: RTV Slovenija

Regular season
- Top seed: Zlatorog Laško
- Season MVP: (United States) Kervin Bristol
- Relegated: LTH Castings Mercator

Finals
- Champions: Krka (6th title)
- Runners-up: Union Olimpija
- Semifinalists: Zlatorog Laško; Maribor
- Finals MVP: (Slovenia) Matjaž Smodiš

Statistical leaders
Points	(Slovenia) Sašo Zagorac	17.5
Rebounds	(United States) Kervin Bristol	10.9
Assists	(Slovenia) Daniel Vujasinović	5.8

The 2012–13 Telemach League was the 22nd season of the Premier A Slovenian Basketball League, the highest professional basketball league in Slovenia. The first half of the season consisted of 10 teams and a 90-game regular season (18 games for each of the 10 teams) and began on Saturday, 20 October 2012. The second half of the season consisted of two teams from the Adriatic League and the best four teams from first half of the season.

== Teams for the 2012–13 season ==
Team	City	Arena	Capacity	Head coach
Elektra	Šoštanj	Šoštanj Sports Hall	600	Sebastjan Krašovec
Grosuplje	Grosuplje	Brinje Sports Hall	800	Tone Krump
Helios	Domžale	Komunalni center Hall	2,500	Zmago Sagadin
Hopsi	Polzela	Polzela Sports Hall	1,800	Jernej Kobale
Krka*	Novo Mesto	Leon Štukelj Hall	2,800	Aleksander Sekulić
LTH Castings Mercator	Škofja Loka	Poden Hall	500	Gašper Potočnik
Maribor	Maribor	Tabor Hall	3,261	Igor Kuzma
Olimpija*	Ljubljana	Arena Stožice	12,500	Sašo Filipovski
Rogaška Crystal	Rogaška Slatina	II. OŠ Rogaška Slatina	800	Dragan Višnjevac
Slovan	Ljubljana	Kodeljevo Sports Hall	1,540	Gašper Okorn
Tajfun	Šentjur	Hruševec Sports Hall	450	Damjan Novaković
Zlatorog	Laško	Tri Lilije Hall	2,500	Miloš Šporar

Teams from the Adriatic League

2012–13 Telemach League club locations

== Regular season ==
	Team	Pld	W	L	PF	PA	Pts
1	Zlatorog Laško	18	13	5	1384	1326	31
2	Maribor	18	12	6	1418	1309	30
3	Helios Domžale	18	12	6	1343	1255	30
4	Tajfun	18	12	6	1445	1375	30
5	Rogaška Crystal	18	11	7	1215	1234	29
6	Elektra Šoštanj	18	8	10	1248	1224	26
7	Slovan	18	6	12	1321	1347	24
8	LTH Castings Mercator	18	6	12	1322	1402	24
9	Hopsi Polzela	18	6	12	1287	1390	24
10	Grosuplje	18	4	14	1295	1416	22

Qualified for the Champions stage

Pld – Played; W – Won; L – Lost; PF – Points for; PA – Points against; Pts – Points.

== Champions standings ==
Pos	Team	Total					
		P	W	L	F	A	Pts
1	Krka	10	9	1	784	669	19
2	Olimpija	10	7	3	758	674	17
3	Maribor	10	5	5	724	743	15
4	Zlatorog Laško	10	3	7	753	799	13
5	Helios Domžale	10	3	7	664	715	13
6	Tajfun	10	3	7	691	774	13

P=Matches played, W=Matches won, L=Matches lost, F=Points for, A=Points against, Pts=Points

Qualified for the Playoff stage

== Relegation league ==
Pos	Team	P	W	L	F	A	Pts
1	Rogaška Crystal	28	17	11	1960	1958	45
2	Hopsi Polzela	28	13	15	2132	2169	41
3	Slovan	28	12	16	2059	2067	40
4	Elektra Šoštanj	28	12	16	1992	2005	40
5	Grosuplje	28	10	18	1969	2086	38
6	LTH Castings Mercator	28	7	21	1999	2151	35

P=Matches played, W=Matches won, L=Matches lost, F=Points for, A=Points against, Pts=Points

Relegated

== Playoffs ==
Semi-finals
1	Krka	2
4	Zlatorog Laško	0
2	Olimpija	2
3	Maribor	0

Final
1	Krka	3
2	Olimpija	1

== Finals ==
TV SLO 2

13 May
8:00 pm

Report

Krka 81, Olimpija 68
Scoring by quarter: 15–18, 22–17, 26–20, 18–13
Pts: Jakov Vladovic 15; Rebs: Jaka Klobucar 8 Asts: Jakov Vladovic 8	Pts: Jaka Blazic 19; Rebs: Jaka Blazic 5 Asts: Jan Mocnik 4

Leon Štukelj Hall, Novo Mesto
Attendance: 1,500
Referees: Saša Pukl, Andrej Lovšin, Boris Krejić

TV SLO 2

15 May
6:00 pm

Report

Olimpija 77, Krka 79
Scoring by quarter: 16–15, 18–27, 16–18, 27–19
Pts: Jaka Blazic 16; Rebs: Alen Omic 6 Asts: Mocnik, Blazic, Bubnic, Perkovic 2 each	Pts: Domen Lorbek 17; Rebs: Smiljan Pavic 12; Asts: Jaka Klobucar 4

Arena Stožice, Ljubljana
Attendance: 3,000
Referees: Matej Boltauzer, Sašo Petek, Milan Nedović

TV SLO 2

17 May
8:00 pm

Report

Krka 68, Olimpija 73
Scoring by quarter: 22–23, 11–19, 12-13, 23–18
Pts: Jakov Vladovic 13; Rebs: Jaka Klobucar 9 Asts: Jakov Vladovic 5	Pts: Jaka Blazic 17; Rebs: Alen Omic 5 Asts: Klemen Prepelic 8

Leon Štukelj Hall, Novo Mesto
Attendance: 3,000
Referees: Damir Javor, Mario Majkič, Boris Krejić

TV SLO 2

20 May
6:00 pm

Report

Olimpija 61, Krka 71
Scoring by quarter: 11–18, 19–18, 16–18, 15–17
Pts: Prepelic, Salin 14 each Rebs: Alen Omic 7 Asts: Mocnik, Prepelic 3 each	Pts: Matjaž Smodiš 21; Rebs: Jakov Vladovic 6 Asts: Domen Lorbek 4
Krka wins Slovenian League Finals series, 3–1

Arena Stožice, Ljubljana
Attendance: 3,300
Referees: Sašo Petek, Andrej Lovšin, Mario Majkič

Telemach League 2012–13
Champions

Krka
6th title

== Awards ==
=== Regular season MVP ===
- (Slovenia) Dejan Mlakar (Slovan)

=== Season MVP ===
- (United States) Kervin Bristol (Hopsi Polzela)

=== Finals MVP ===
- (Slovenia) Matjaž Smodiš (Krka)

=== Weekly MVP ===
==== Regular season ====
Week	MVP	Club	Efficiency
1 ^{c}	(Slovenia) Boban Tomić	LTG Castings Mercator	26
1 ^{c}	(Canada) David Collins	Elektra Šoštanj	26
2	(Canada) Jasonn Hannibal	Hopsi Polzela	24
3	(Canada) Jasonn Hannibal (2)	Hopsi Polzela	28
4	(Slovenia) Anže Pelc	Tajfun	30
5	(Slovenia) Boban Tomić (2)	LTG Castings Mercator	25
6	(Croatia) Mladen Primorac	Tajfun	28
7	(Slovenia) Samo Udrih	Zlatorog Laško	38
8	(Serbia) Miloš Miljković	Rogaška	31
9	(Canada) David Collins (2)	Elektra Šoštanj	32
10	(Slovenia) Dejan Mlakar	Slovan	35
11	(Slovenia) Jure Pelko	Maribor Messer	33
12 ^{c}	(Slovenia) Robert Abramović	LTG Castings Mercator	24
12 ^{c}	(Slovenia) Andrej Podvršnik	Elektra Šoštanj	24
13	(Slovenia) Uroš Zadnik	Zlatorog Laško	29
14	(Slovenia) Goran Jagodnik	Hopsi Polzela	30
15	(Slovenia) Sašo Zagorac	Grosuplje	26
16	(Slovenia) Dejan Mlakar (2)	Slovan	44
17	(Slovenia) Daniel Vujasinović	Hopsi Polzela	26
18	(Slovenia) Stipe Modrić	Slovan	24

Note

^c – Co-MVP's were announced.

==== Second round ====
Week	MVP	Club	EFF
1	(Slovenia) Luka Lapornik	Zlatorog Laško	35
2	(Serbia) Đorđe Majstorović	Helios Domžale	25
3	(Slovenia) Alen Omić	Union Olimpija	24
4 ^{c}	(Slovenia) Klemen Prepelič	Union Olimpija	26
4 ^{c}	(Bosnia and Herzegovina) Igor Josipović	Maribor Messer	26
5	(Slovenia) Samo Udrih	Zlatorog Laško	27
6	(Slovenia) Dino Murić	Union Olimpija	28
7	(Slovenia) Smiljan Pavič	Krka Novo Mesto	33
8	(Slovenia) Dino Murić (2)	Union Olimpija	25
9	(Croatia) Damir Rančić	Helios Domžale	21
10	(Serbia) Đorđe Majstorović (2)	Helios Domžale	31

== Statistics leaders ==
=== Performance Index Rating ===
Pos	Player	Club	PIR
1	(United States) Kervin Bristol	Hopsi Polzela	20.07
2	(Serbia) Miloš Miljković	Rogaška	17.46
3	(Slovenia) Goran Jagodnik	Hopsi Polzela	16.78

=== Points ===
Pos	Player	Club	PPG
1	(Slovenia) Sašo Zagorac	Grosuplje	17.50
2	(Slovenia) Goran Jagodnik	Hopsi Polzela	17.28
3	(Slovenia) Robert Abramović	LTH Castings Mercator	16.79

=== Rebounds ===
Pos	Player	Club	RPG
1	(United States) Kervin Bristol	Hopsi Polzela	10.86
2	(Slovenia) Dino Murić	Union Olimpija	8.11
3	(Serbia) Miloš Miljković	Rogaška	8.07

=== Assists ===
Pos	Player	Club	APG
1	(Slovenia) Daniel Vujasinović	Hopsi Polzela	5.81
2	(Slovenia) Bojan Jovanović	Maribor Messer	5.28
3	(Slovenia) Boban Tomić	LTH Castings Mercator	5.00

Category	Player	Stat
Points per game	(Slovenia) Sašo Zagorac (Grosuplje)	17.5
Rebounds per game	(United States) Kervin Bristol (Hopsi Polzela)	10.9
Assists per game	(Slovenia) Daniel Vujasinović (Hopsi Polzela)	5.9
Steals per game	(Slovenia) Samo Udrih (Zlatorog Laško)	1.9
Blocks per game	(United States) Kervin Bristol (Hopsi Polzela)	2.4
Field goal percentage	(Croatia) Mladen Primorac (Tajfun)	51.8%
Free throw percentage	(Slovenia) Goran Jagodnik (Hopsi Polzela)	90.4%
Three-point field goal percentage	(Slovenia) Jure Besedič (Helios Domžale)	47.2%
