= 2010–11 Slovenian Basketball League =

1. A SKL
- Season: 2010–11
- Duration: 16 October 2010 – 11 June 2011
- Teams: 9 + 2
- TV partner: RTV Slovenija

Regular season
- Top seed: Krka Novo Mesto
- Season MVP: (United States) Gregg Thondique

Finals
- Champions: Krka Novo Mesto; 4th title
- Runners-up: Union Olimpija
- Semifinalists: Helios Domžale; Zlatorog
- Finals MVP: (Slovenia) Zoran Dragić

Statistical leaders
Points	(United States) Benjamin Raymond	17.7
Rebounds	(United States) Gregg Thondique	10.5
Assists	(Serbia) Igor Mijajlović	4.7

The 2010–11 Slovenian Basketball League (official: 2010–11 Telemach League) was the 20th season of the Premier A Slovenian Basketball League, the highest professional basketball league in Slovenia. Krka Novo Mesto won its 4th national championship.

== Teams for the 2010–11 season ==
Team	City	Arena	Capacity	Head coach
Elektra	Šoštanj	Šoštanj Sport Hall	600	Dušan Hauptman
Geoplin Slovan	Ljubljana	Kodeljevo Sports Hall	1,540	Gašper Okorn
Helios	Domžale	Komunalni center Hall	2,500	Rado Trifunović
Hopsi	Polzela	Polzela Sport Hall	1,800	Tonči Mašina
Krka*	Novo Mesto	Leon Štukelj Hall	2,800	Aleksandar Džikić
LTHcast Mercator	Škofja Loka	Poden Hall	500	Gašper Potočnik
Maribor Messer	Maribor	Tabor Hall	3,261	Slobodan Rmuš
Šentjur	Šentjur	Hruševec Sports Hall	450	Damjan Novaković
Union Olimpija*	Ljubljana	Arena Stožice	12,500	Jure Zdovc
Parklji	Ljubljana	ŠRC Ježica	300	Đorđe Đokić
Šentjur	Šentjur	Hruševec Sports Hall	450	Damjan Novaković
Zlatorog Laško	Laško	Tri Lilije Hall	2,500	Aleš Pipan

Teams from the Adriatic League

Telemach League 2010–11 club Locations

== Regular season ==
Pos	Team	P	W	L	F	A	Pts
1	Helios Domžale	16	15	1	1264	1065	31
2	Zlatorog Laško	16	12	4	1282	1153	28
3	Hopsi Polzela	16	11	5	1208	1147	27
4	Geoplin Slovan	16	10	6	1259	1186	26
5	Elektra Šoštanj	16	9	7	1132	1058	25
6	Maribor Messer	16	6	10	1191	1194	22
7	Šentjur	16	6	10	1213	1256	22
8	LTHcast Mercator	16	3	13	1085	1248	19
9	Parklji Ljubljana	16	0	16	1106	1433	16

P=Matches played, W=Matches won, L=Matches lost, F=Points for, A=Points against, Pts=Points

Qualified for the Champions stage

== Champions standings ==
Pos	Team	P	W	L	F	A	Pts
1	Krka	14	13	1	1183	893	27
2	Union Olimpija	14	10	4	1111	917	24
3	Helios Domžale	14	10	4	1109	1064	24
4	Zlatorog Laško	14	8	6	997	1002	22
5	Geoplin Slovan	14	5	9	970	1057	19
6	Hopsi Polzela	14	5	9	977	1055	19
7	Maribor Messer	14	3	11	964	1140	17
8	Elektra Šoštanj	14	2	12	900	1083	16

P=Matches played, W=Matches won, L=Matches lost, F=Points for, A=Points against, Pts=Points

Qualified for the Playoff stage

== League for place 9-11 ==
Pos	Team	P	W	L	F	A	Pts
1	Šentjur	4	3	1	357	286	7
2	LTHcast Mercator	4	2	2	281	314	6
3	Parklji Ljubljana	4	1	3	296	334	5

P=Matches played, W=Matches won, L=Matches lost, F=Points for, A=Points against, Pts=Points

== Playoffs ==
Semi-finals
1	Krka	2
4	Zlatorog Laško	0
2	Union Olimpija	2
3	Helios Domžale	0

Final
1	Krka	3
2	Union Olimpija	2

== Finals ==
TV SLO 2

2 June
6:00 pm

Report

Krka 78, Union Olimpija 55
Scoring by quarter: 24–15, 13–15, 22–10, 19–28
Pts: Dušan Djordjević 19; Rebs: Jure Balažič 8 Asts: Dušan Djordjević, Bojan Krivec 3	Pts: Kenny Gregory 11; Rebs: Giorgi Shermadini 6 Asts: Sašo Ožbolt 5

Leon Štukelj Hall, Novo Mesto
Attendance: 2,400
Referees: Saša Pukl, Matej Boltauzer, Tomo Kovačič

TV SLO 2

4 June
5:30 pm

Report

Union Olimpija 61, Krka 59
Scoring by quarter: 12–18, 19–18, 13–10, 17–13
Pts: Goran Jagodnik, Giorgi Shermadini 12; Rebs: Goran Jagodnik 6 Asts: Kenny Gregory, Vlado Ilievski 2	Pts: Zoran Dragić 15; Rebs: Zoran Dragić 9 Asts: Dušan Djordjević 4

Arena Stožice, Ljubljana
Attendance: 5,000
Referees: Matej Boltauzer, Damir Javor, Matej Špendl

TV SLO 2

7 June
8:00 pm

Report

Krka 63, Union Olimpija 69
Scoring by quarter: 23–15, 9–24, 13-13, 18–17
Pts: Jure Balažič 15; Rebs: Zoran Dragić 9 Asts: Dušan Djordjević 8	Pts: Jaka Klobučar 15; Rebs: Damir Markota 7 Asts: Sašo Ožbolt 4

Leon Štukelj Hall, Novo Mesto
Attendance: 2,500
Referees: Saša Pukl, Andrej Lovšin, Sašo Petek

TV SLO 2

9 June
8:00 pm

Report

Union Olimpija 61, Krka 63
Scoring by quarter: 10–27, 22–13, 9–12, 20–11
Pts: Jaka Klobučar 15; Rebs: Damir Markota 7 Asts: Sašo Ožbolt 3	Pts: Chris Booker 13; Rebs: Chris Booker, Zoran Dragić 8 Asts: Dušan Djordjević 5

Arena Stožice, Ljubljana
Attendance: 7,500
Referees: Damir Javor, Roman Kolar, Mario Majkič

TV SLO 2

11 June
8:00 pm

Report

Krka 64, Union Olimpija 57
Scoring by quarter: 17–7, 8–21, 14–9, 25–20
Pts: Jure Balažič 14; Rebs: Zoran Dragić 13; Asts: Dušan Djordjević 3	Pts: Kenny Gregory 12; Rebs: Goran Jagodnik 7 Asts: Vlado Ilievski 6
Krka wins Slovenian League Finals series, 3–2

Leon Štukelj Hall, Novo Mesto
Attendance: 2,900
Referees: Saša Pukl, Matej Boltauzer, Damir Javor

Telemach League 2010–11
Champions

Krka
4th title

== Awards ==
=== Regular season MVP ===
- (United States) Gregg Thondique (Hopsi Polzela)

=== Season MVP ===
- (United States) Gregg Thondique (Hopsi Polzela)

=== Finals MVP ===
- (Slovenia) Zoran Dragić (Krka)

=== Weekly MVP ===
==== Regular season ====
Week	MVP	Club	Efficiency
1	(Serbia) Miloš Miljković	Elektra Šoštanj	36
2 ^{c}	(Slovenia) Dejan Hohler	Šentjur	23
2 ^{c}	(Slovenia) Matej Venta	Hopsi Polzela	23
3	(Slovenia) Primož Brolih	Maribor Messer	29
4	(Slovenia) Salih Nuhanović	Elektra Šoštanj	27
5 ^{c}	(Slovenia) Salih Nuhanović (2)	Elektra Šoštanj	29
5 ^{c}	(Slovenia) Aljoša Remus	Maribor Messer	29
6	(Serbia) Vladimir Panić	Zlatorog Laško	36
7	(Slovenia) Dario Krejič	Parklji Ljubljana	34
8	(Slovenia) Miloš Paravinja	Parklji Ljubljana	23
9	(Slovenia) Daniel Vujasinović	Zlatorog Laško	40
10	(Slovenia) Boris Jeršin	Elektra Šoštanj	37
11	(United States) Gregg Thondique	Hopsi Polzela	27
12	(Slovenia) Salih Nuhanović (3)	Elektra Šoštanj	37
13	(Serbia) Vladimir Panić (2)	Zlatorog Laško	35
14	(Serbia) Miloš Miljković (2)	Elektra Šoštanj	32
15	(Serbia) Vladimir Panić (3)	Zlatorog Laško	30
16	(Slovenia) Elvis Kadić	Maribor Messer	39
17	(Slovenia) Matej Krušič	Geoplin Slovan	30
18	(Slovenia) Tomo Čajič	LTHcast Mercator	48

Note

^c – Co-MVP's were announced.

==== Second round ====
Week	MVP	Club	EFF
1	(United States) Gregg Thondique	Hopsi Polzela	41
2	(Serbia) Igor Mijajlović	Hopsi Polzela	31
3	(Slovenia) Salih Nuhanović	Elektra Šoštanj	27
4	(Serbia) Vladimir Panić	Zlatorog Laško	30
5	(United States) Benjamin Raymond	Helios Domžale	36
6	(Serbia) Vladimir Panić (2)	Zlatorog Laško	35
7	(Slovenia) Žiga Zagorc	Helios Domžale	30
8	(Serbia) Vladimir Panić (3)	Zlatorog Laško	35
9	(Slovenia) Smiljan Pavić	Krka	31
10	(United States) Benjamin Raymond (2)	Helios Domžale	31
11	(Uzbekistan) Dmitry Sviridov	Hopsi Polzela	31
12	(Serbia) Dalibor Djapa	Slovan	31
13	(Serbia) Vladimir Panić (4)	Zlatorog Laško	34
14	(United States) Benjamin Raymond (3)	Helios Domžale	38

== Statistics leaders ==
=== Performance Index Rating ===
Pos	Player	Club	PIR
1	(United States) Gregg Thondique	Hopsi Polzela	22.84
2	(United States) Benjamin Raymond	Helios Domžale	19.79
3	(Croatia) Teo Šimović	Šentjur	17.60

=== Points ===
Pos	Player	Club	PPG
1	(United States) Benjamin Raymond	Helios Domžale	17.68
2	(Slovenia) Jure Eržen	Parklji	16.86
3	(Croatia) Teo Šimović	Šentjur	16.60

=== Rebounds ===
Pos	Player	Club	RPG
1	(United States) Gregg Thondique	Hopsi Polzela	10.53
2	(Croatia) Teo Šimović	Šentjur	8.75
3	(United States) Benjamin Raymond	Helios Domžale	7.42

=== Assists ===
Pos	Player	Club	APG
1	(Serbia) Igor Mijajlović	Hopsi Polzela	4.68
2	(Slovenia) Primož Brolih	Maribor Messer	4.42
3	(Slovenia) Boris Jeršin	Elektra	4.14
