= Lorbek =

Lorbek is a surname. Notable people with the surname include:

- Domen Lorbek (born 1985), Slovenian basketball player
- Erazem Lorbek (born 1984), Slovenian basketball player
- Klemen Lorbek (born 1988), Slovenian basketball player
- Nik Lorbek (born 1996), Slovenian footballer
