= Dončić =

Dončić (/ˈdɒntʃɪtʃ/; Slovene: [ˈdòːntʃitʃ]; Cyrillic: Дончић) is a Serbo-Croatian surname. It is spelled as Dončič in Slovenia. It may refer to:

- Danilo Dončić (born 1969), Serbian football manager
- Luka Dončić (born 1999), Slovenian basketball player
- Saša Dončić (born 1974), Slovenian basketball player and coach
- Siniša Hajdaš Dončić (born 1974), Croatian politician
