= Močnik (surname) =

Močnik is a surname. Notable people with the surname include:

- Jan Močnik (born 1987), Slovene basketball player
- Jure Močnik (born 1985), Slovene basketball player
- Rastko Močnik (born 1944), Slovene sociologist
