= Jure Lalić =

Croatian basketball player

Personal information
- Born: 8 February 1986 (age 40) Makarska, SR Croatia, SFR Yugoslavia
- Listed height: 6 ft 11 in (2.11 m)
- Listed weight: 242 lb (110 kg)

Career information
- NBA draft: 2008: undrafted
- Playing career: 2004–present
- Position: Center
- Number: 21

Career history
- 2001–2004: Amfora Makarska
- 2004–2008: Zadar
- 2008–2010: Spirou Charleroi
- 2010: Olimpija Ljubljana
- 2010–2011: Cibona
- 2012–2013: Krka
- 2013–2014: Lukoil Academic
- 2014–2015: Cibona
- 2015: Zielona Góra
- 2015–2016: Krka
- 2016–2018: MZT Skopje
- 2018–2019: Krka
- 2019–2020: Kaposvár

Career highlights
- 2× Croatian League (2005, 2008); Belgian League (2009); 2× Slovenian League (2012, 2013); Polish League (2015); Macedonian League (2017); 3× Croatian Cup (2005−2007); Belgian Cup (2009); Poland Cup (2015); Slovenian Cup (2016); Macedonian Cup (2018)

Jure Lalić (born 8 February 1986) is a Croatian professional basketball player who plays for Kaposvár of the Hungarian League.
