= Zoran Dragić =

Slovenian basketball player (born 1989)

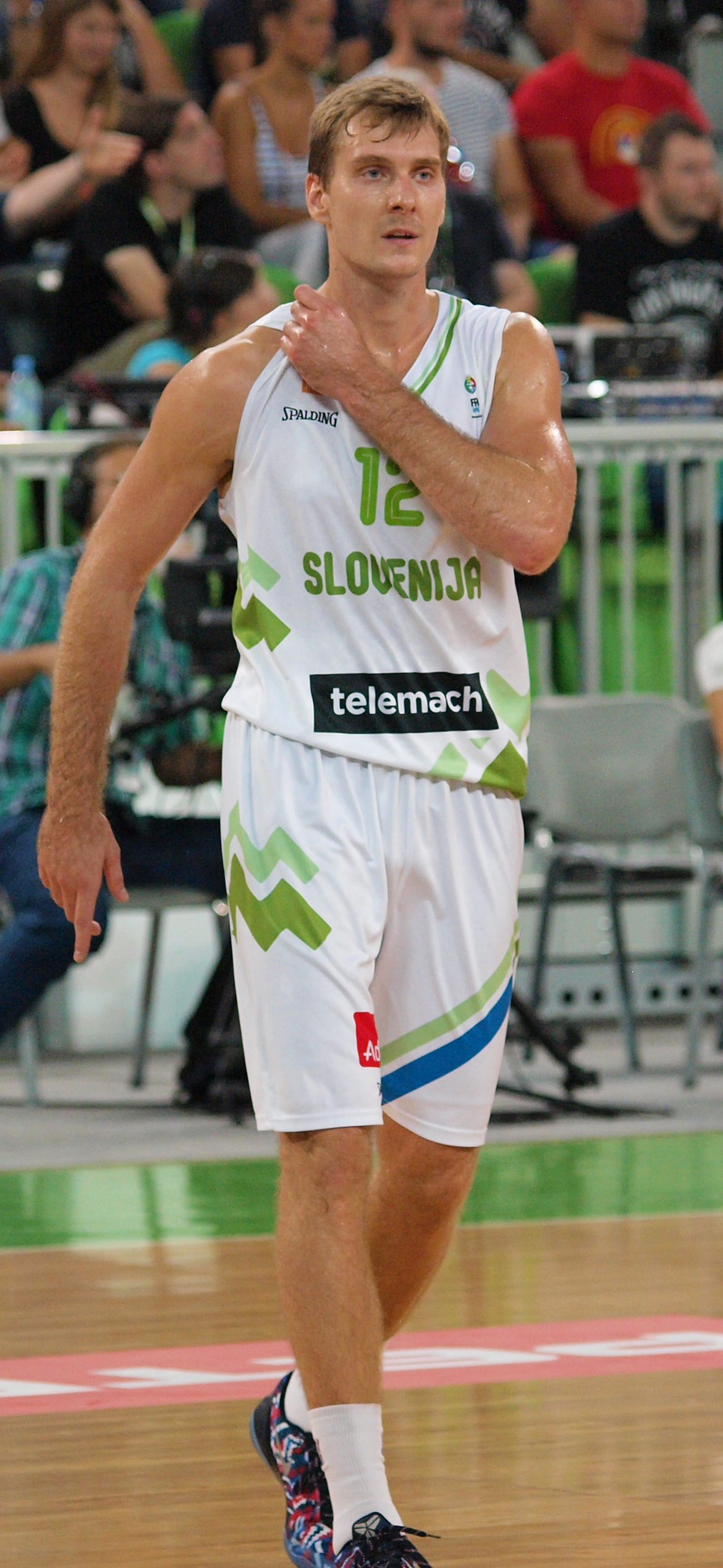
- Dragić in a friendly match vs Serbia in 2015

Free agent
- Position: Shooting guard / small forward

Personal information
- Born: June 22, 1989 (age 37) Ljubljana, SR Slovenia, Yugoslavia
- Listed height: 1.96 m (6 ft 5 in)
- Listed weight: 91 kg (201 lb)

Career information
- NBA draft: 2011: undrafted
- Playing career: 2004–present

Career history
- 2004–2005: KD Ilirija
- 2005–2006: Janče STZ
- 2006–2010: KD Slovan
- 2010–2012: BC Krka
- 2012–2014: Unicaja Málaga
- 2014–2015: Phoenix Suns
- 2015: Miami Heat
- 2015: → Sioux Falls Skyforce
- 2015–2016: BC Khimki
- 2016–2017: Olimpia Milano
- 2017–2018: Anadolu Efes
- 2019: Pallacanestro Trieste
- 2019–2020: Ratiopharm Ulm
- 2020–2021: Saski Baskonia
- 2021: Žalgiris Kaunas
- 2022–2023: Cedevita Olimpija
- 2024–2025: Bilbao Basket
- 2025–2026: Split

Career highlights
- FIBA Europe Cup champion (2025); 5× Slovenian League champion (2011, 2012, 2022–2024); Spanish League champion (2020); Italian Cup winner (2017); Turkish Cup winner (2018); 3× Slovenian Cup winner (2022–2024); Croatian Cup winner (2026); 2× Slovenian Supercup winner (2010, 2011); 2× Italian Super Cup winner (2016, 2017); Slovenian League Finals MVP (2011)
- Stats at NBA.com
- Stats at Basketball Reference

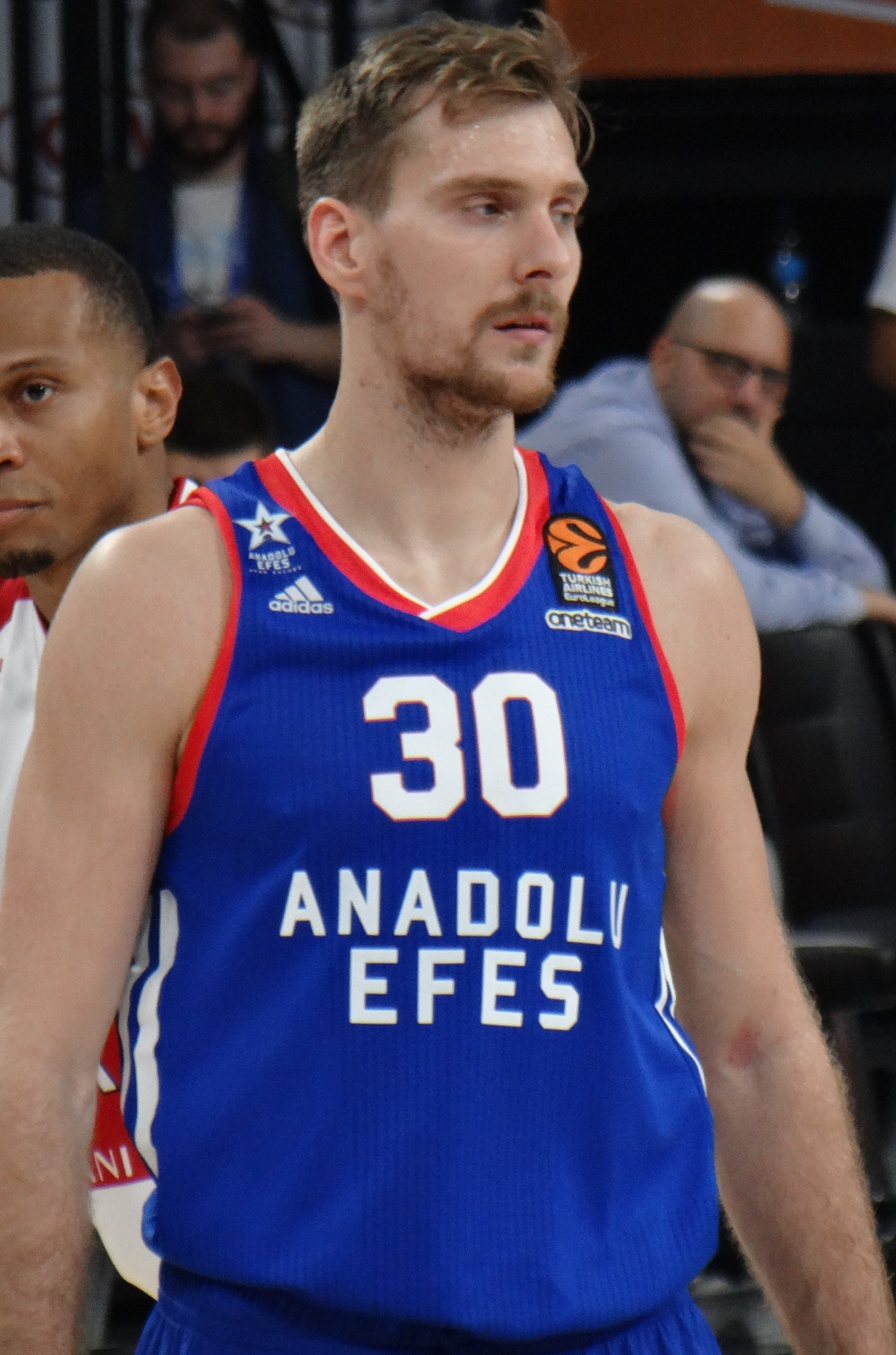
Dragić with Anadolu Efes in 2017

Zoran Dragić (born June 22, 1989) is a Slovenian professional basketball player who most recently played for Split of the Croatian League and the ABA League. He also represented the Slovenian national basketball team internationally. Standing at 1.96 m (6 ft 5 in), he plays the shooting guard and small forward positions. He is the younger brother of Goran Dragić.

== Professional career ==
=== Early years ===
In 2004, Dragić joined Ilirija of the Slovenian 1B league for the 2004–05 season. A year afterwards, he joined Janče STZ of the Slovenian D2 league for the 2005–06 season. During 2006, he signed with Geoplin Slovan of the Slovenian League where he went on to play four seasons for them. In 2010, he signed with Krka where he went on to play two seasons for them.

=== Málaga (2012–2014) ===
In July 2012, Dragić joined the Houston Rockets for the 2012 NBA Summer League. On August 20, 2012, he signed a two-year deal with Unicaja Málaga of the Liga ACB. On July 8, 2014, he signed a two-year contract extension with Unicaja Málaga. However, after agreeing to sign with the Phoenix Suns, Dragić and Málaga agreed to part ways on September 26, 2014.

=== Phoenix Suns (2014–2015) ===
On September 29, 2014, Dragić signed a two-year deal with the Phoenix Suns. He went on to make his NBA debut on November 15, 2014, against the Los Angeles Clippers. He and Goran, alongside teammates Markieff and Marcus Morris, all briefly played together for the Suns during the fourth quarter of their 112–96 victory over the Philadelphia 76ers on January 2, 2015. It marked the first time in the NBA's history that two different pairs of brothers played together for the same team at the same time. In what was just his third game of the season, he also recorded his first NBA stats with 3 points, 1 rebound, and 1 assist.

=== Miami Heat (2015) ===
On February 19, 2015, Zoran and his brother Goran were traded to the Miami Heat in a three-team deal also involving the New Orleans Pelicans. On March 4, he was assigned to the Sioux Falls Skyforce of the NBA Development League. On March 15, he was recalled by Miami. In the Heat's season finale against the Philadelphia 76ers on April 15, Dragić scored a season-high 22 points. In July 2015, he joined the Heat for the 2015 NBA Summer League. On July 27, Dragić was traded to the Boston Celtics, along with a 2020 second round pick and cash considerations, in exchange for a 2019 second round pick. However, on August 10, he was waived by the Celtics.

=== Return to Europe ===
On August 13, 2015, Dragić signed a two-year deal with the Russian club Khimki. After one season he left Khimki, and on July 7, 2016, he signed with Italian club Olimpia Milano. He was released from Milano on November 20, 2017. The next day, he signed with Turkish club Anadolu Efes.

His season ended prematurely on February 20, 2018, when he suffered a torn anterior cruciate ligament. Dragić nursed and recovered from his injury and returned in January 2019.

He signed with Serie A club Alma Trieste on January 8, 2019, until the end of the 2018–2019 season.

On August 6, 2019, he signed with ratiopharm Ulm of the German Basketball Bundesliga (BBL).

On January 30, 2020, Dragić officially signed with Liga ACB club Baskonia for the rest of the season, making his return to the EuroLeague. He signed a contract extension with the team on August 5.

On October 30, 2021, Dragić signed with Žalgiris Kaunas of the Lithuanian Basketball League, for the remainder of the season. He parted ways with the team on December 31.

On January 9, 2022, Dragić signed with Cedevita Olimpija of the Slovenian League and the ABA League.

On August 6, 2024, he signed with Bilbao Basket of the Spanish Liga ACB.

On September 20, 2025, he signed with Split of the Croatian League and ABA League.

== National team career ==
Dragić started playing for the Slovenian national junior team in the 2007 FIBA Europe Under-18 Championship. He also participated in the 2009 FIBA Europe Under-20 Championship, during which he would be the tournament's 4th best scorer, throughout the entire competition.

In 2011, Dragić participated with the Slovenian senior squad, alongside his brother, Goran, during the EuroBasket 2011 tournament. After the success he had in 2011, he also played for Slovenia in the EuroBasket 2013 tournament, and helped the team finish with a better place in the final standings than the previous tournament. He went on to play for Slovenia in the 2014 FIBA Basketball World Cup, where his performance became a leading catalyst for his eventual signing with the Phoenix Suns later that year.

He represented Slovenia at the EuroBasket 2015, where they were eliminated by Latvia in the round of 16. After an absence at the 2017 tournament, Dragić was on the roster for EuroBasket 2022 where Slovenia was eliminated in the quarter-finals by Poland.

== Career statistics ==
Legend
GP	Games played	GS	Games started	MPG	Minutes per game
FG%	Field-goal percentage	3P%	3-point field-goal percentage	FT%	Free-throw percentage
RPG	Rebounds per game	APG	Assists per game	SPG	Steals per game
BPG	Blocks per game	PPG	Points per game	PIR	Performance index rating
**Bold**	Career high

=== NBA ===
==== Regular season ====
Year	Team	GP	GS	MPG	FG%	3P%	FT%	RPG	APG	SPG	BPG	PPG
2014–15	Phoenix	6	0	2.2	.250	.000	**.667**	**.5**	.2	.0	.0	1.0
2014–15	Miami	**10**	**1**	**6.2**	**.409**	**.333**	.500	**.5**	**.4**	**.2**	.0	**2.2**
Career		16	1	4.7	.367	.214	.600	.5	.3	.1	.0	1.8

=== EuroLeague ===
Year	Team	GP	GS	MPG	FG%	3P%	FT%	RPG	APG	SPG	BPG	PPG	PIR
2012–13	Unicaja	22	13	16.3	.398	.129	.741	**3.0**	.5	.7	.0	4.5	4.5
2013–14	Unicaja	22	**19**	22.9	.413	.354	.703	2.7	1.6	.7	.1	**10.9**	**10.0**
2015–16	Khimki	24	5	16.7	**.490**	.338	.662	2.5	.8	**.8**	.0	8.0	7.6
2016–17	Milano	23	14	19.2	.445	.296	.727	2.2	.7	.7	**.2**	7.0	4.8
2017–18	Anadolu Efes	14	10	**28.1**	.429	.304	**.853**	2.1	**2.7**	**.8**	.1	10.6	9.6
2019–20	Baskonia	5	1	17.4	.367	**.357**	.706	2.0	.4	.6	—	7.8	6.0
2020–21	Baskonia	**33**	3	18.0	.421	.284	.787	1.6	.9	.6	—	8.5	6.8
2021–22	Žalgiris	9	5	13.2	.293	.250	.700	1.2	.6	.4	.1	3.9	2.1
Career		152	70	19.1	.425	.300	.737	2.2	1.0	.7	.1	7.9	6.7

== Personal life ==
His father is of Serbian descent. Dragić's older brother, Goran, most recently played for the Milwaukee Bucks and who is now in retirement. The two brothers were teammates on both the Suns and Heat during the 2014–15 season. During an interview with Goran in 2014, it was revealed that Zoran was also married.
