= Klemen Lorbek =

Slovenian basketball player

Personal information
- Born: June 26, 1988 (age 38) Ljubljana, SR Slovenia, SFR Yugoslavia
- Listed height: 1.98 m (6 ft 6 in)

Career information
- Playing career: 2003–2012
- Position: Point guard / shooting guard

Career history
- 2003–2004: Union Olimpija
- 2004–2005: Triglav Kranj
- 2005–2006: Helios Domžale
- 2006–2007: Union Olimpija
- 2006–2007: → Postojna
- 2007–2010: Hopsi Polzela
- 2010: Helios Domžale
- 2010–2011: Union Olimpija
- 2011: KD Slovan
- 2011–2012: KK Parklji Ljubljana

Klemen Lorbek (born June 26, 1988) is a Slovenian professional basketball player and younger brother of Erazem Lorbek and Domen Lorbek. He is 198 cm tall.

== Pro career ==
Lorbek has played with Union Olimpija, Triglav Kranj, Helios Domžale, Postojna and Hopsi Polzela.

== Slovenian national team ==
He was member of the Slovenian Junior national team; played at the 2005 Junior European Championship in Belgrade; played at the 2006 Junior European Championship in Greece; was member of the Slovenian Cadets National team; played at the 2004 Cadets European Championship in Bulgaria.
