= Afik Nissim =

Israeli basketball player (born 1981)

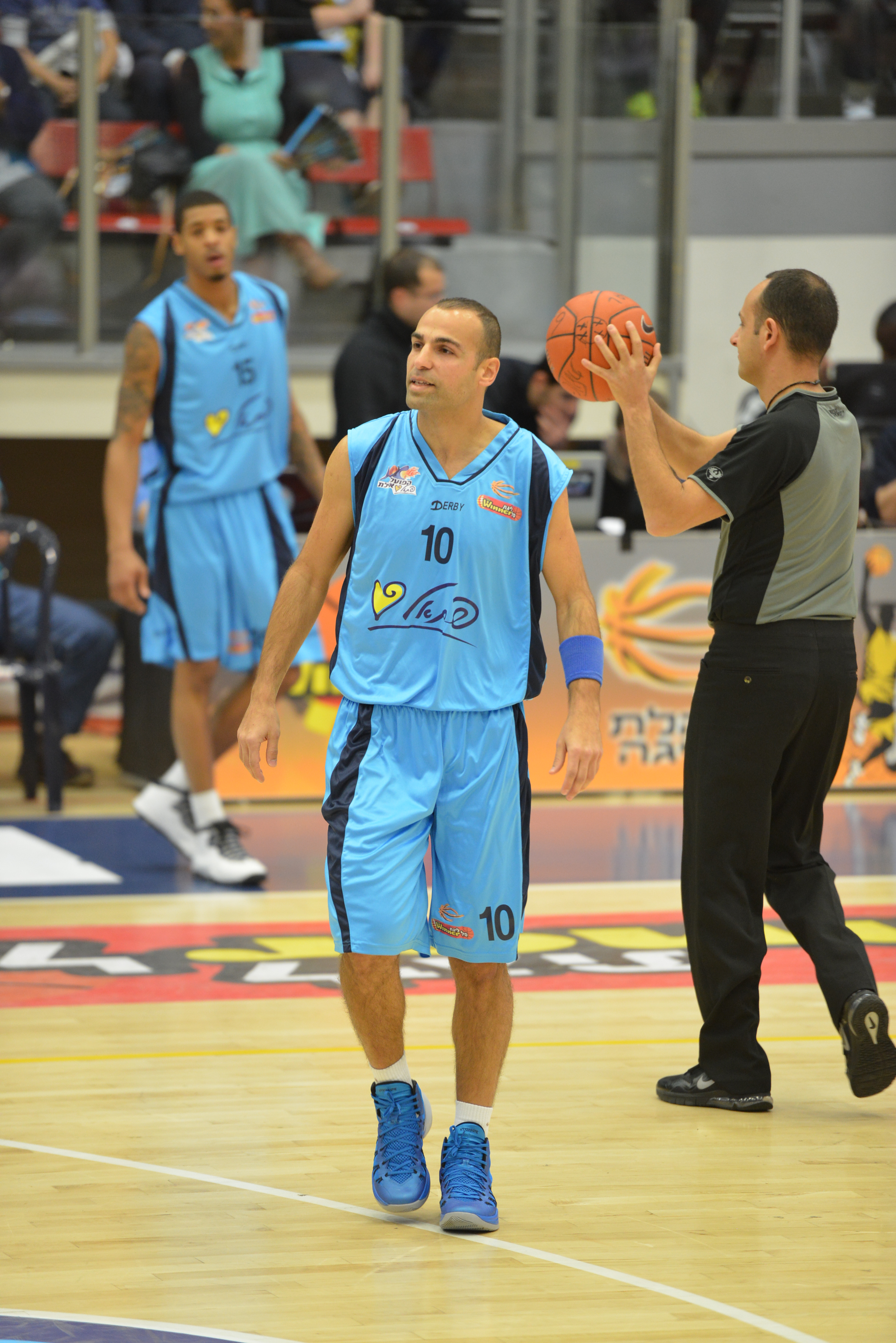
- Nissim with Hapoel Eilat, 2013

Personal information
- Born: 31 January 1981 (age 45) Rehovot, Israel
- Listed height: 1.85 m (6 ft 1 in)
- Listed weight: 83 kg (183 lb)

Career information
- Playing career: 1998–2021
- Position: Point guard / shooting guard

Career history
- 1998–2002: Maccabi Rishon LeZion
- 2002–2003: Hapoel Haifa/Ramat HaSharon
- 2003–2005: Strasbourg IG
- 2005–2006: Lokomotiv Kuban
- 2006: Kyiv
- 2006–2008: Strasbourg IG
- 2008–2010: Prima Veroli
- 2010–2011: ČEZ Nymburk
- 2011–2012: Enisey
- 2012: Krka
- 2012–2018: Hapoel Eilat
- 2018–2021: Elitzur Yavne

Career highlights
- French League champion (2005); 2× Italian LNP Cup winner (2009, 2010); Czech Cup winner (2011); Czech League champion (2011); Slovenian League champion (2012); Slovenian League Finals MVP (2012); 4× Israeli League All-Star (2013, 2014, 2016, 2017)

Afik Haim Nissim (Hebrew: אפיק ניסים; born 31 January 1981) is an Israeli former professional basketball player. Standing at 6 ft 1 in (1.85 m), he played at the point guard and shooting guard positions. Currently, he serves as the founder and CEO of the "Win Assist" non-profit organization.

== Early life ==
Nissim was born in Rehovot, Israel, to a Tunisian-Jewish family. He played for Maccabi Rishon LeZion youth team.

== Professional career ==
In 1998, Nissim started his professional career in Maccabi Rishon LeZion.

In 2003, Nissim signed a two-year deal with the French team Strasbourg IG. Nissim won the French League Championship with Strasbourg in 2005.

On 11 July 2008, Nissim signed with the Italian team Prima Veroli under head coach Andrea Trinchieri and alongside his teammate Kyle Hines. Nissim won the Italian LNP Cup with Veroli for two consecutive years.

On 14 September 2010, Nissim signed a one-year deal with the Czech team ČEZ Nymburk under head coach Ronen Ginzburg. Nissim won the 2011 Czech League Championship and the 2011 Czech State Cup titles with Nymburk.

On 13 September 2011, Nissim signed with the Russian team Enisey for the 2011–12 season.

On 8 January 2012, Nissim parted ways with Enisey to join KK Krka of the Slovenian Basketball League for the remainder of the season. Nissim won the 2012 Slovenian League Championship with Krka, earning the Finals MVP honors.

On 8 October 2012, Nissim returned to Israel and signed with Hapoel Eilat. In his third season with Eilat, Nissim helped the team reach the 2015 Israeli League Finals, where they eventually lost to Hapoel Jerusalem.

On 24 August 2016, Nissim signed a two-year contract extension with Hapoel Eilat.

On 18 November 2017, Nissim recorded a career-high 32 points, along with 3 rebounds and 4 assists, shooting 13-for-17 from the field, in an 88–82 win over Hapoel Gilboa Galil.

On 6 November 2018, Nissim signed a one-year deal with Elitzur Yavne of the Israeli National League. In 28 games played for Yavne, he averaged 10.4 points, 1.7 rebounds and 3.4 assists per game.

On 7 July 2019, Nissim signed a one-year contract extension with Yavne.

== National team career ==
Nissim was a member of the Israel national basketball team. He participated in the 2005, 2011 and 2013 Eurobasket tournaments.

Nissim was also a member of the Israeli National Under-20 team. In July 2000, he helped the Israeli team reach the 2000 FIBA Europe Under-20 Championship Final, where they eventually lost to Slovenia.

== Career statistics ==
Legend
GP	Games played	MPG	Minutes per game	FG%	Field goal percentage
3P%	3-point field goal percentage	FT%	Free throw percentage	RPG	Rebounds per game
APG	Assists per game	SPG	Steals per game	BPG	Blocks per game
PPG	Points per game	**Bold**	Career high		Led the league

=== EuroCup ===
Year	Team	GP	GS	MPG	FG%	3P%	FT%	RPG	APG	SPG	BPG	PPG	PIR
2006–07	(France) Strasbourg	**14**	2	20.0	.453	.383	.886	1.4	2.0	**.9**	**.1**	11.1	10.3
2007–08	(France) Strasbourg	10	0	21.9	.390	**.476**	.857	1.9	2.0	.6	.0	10.4	9.7
2010–11	(Czech Republic) Nymburk	11	**9**	**27.6**	**.508**	.405	.889	**2.9**	**2.4**	.8	.0	**12.6**	**12**
2011–12	(Slovenia) Krka	6	6	15.5	.385	.357	**.938**	1.8	2.2	.8	.0	8.3	7.8
**Career**		41	17	21.1	.448	.411	.891	2	2.1	.8	.0	11	9.3

=== Domestic Leagues ===
Year	Team	League	GP	MPG	FG%	3P%	FT%	RPG	APG	SPG	BPG	PPG
1998–99	(Israel) Maccabi Rishon	IPL	9	8.3	**.625**	.438	.600	.8	1.0	.0	.0	4.4
1999–00	(Israel) Maccabi Rishon	IPL	20	23.5	.500	.438	.868	.8	1.8	1.1	.0	11.3
2000–01	(Israel) Maccabi Rishon	IPL	28	-	.462	.326	.875	1.9	3.1	1.0	.0	12.5
2001–02	(Israel) Maccabi Rishon	IPL	27	28.0	.426	.279	.814	1.6	1.9	.9	.0	10.2
2002–03	(Israel) Ramat HaSharon	IPL	27	**34.3**	.530	.422	.826	2.1	3.9	1.6	.0	**16.2**
2003–04	(France) Strasbourg	Pro A	34	18.0	.446	.405	.792	1.5	3.2	.5	.0	8.1
2004–05	(France) Strasbourg	Pro A	37	19.8	.465	.455	.825	1.5	2.2	.6	.0	10.0
2005–06	(Russia) Lokomotiv Kuban	RBSL 1	22	-	.364	**.463**	.882	2.0	2.1	1.0	.0	11.1
2006	(Ukraine) BC Kyiv	UBSL	16	-	.525	.433	**.962**	**3.1**	**5.1**	.7	.0	10.9
2006–07	(France) Strasbourg	Pro A	35	21.1	.446	.397	.878	1.6	2.5	.4	.0	11.3
2007–08	(France) Strasbourg	Pro A	25	24.6	.373	.291	.833	1.6	3.0	.8	.0	9.9
2008–09	(Italy) Prima Veroli	Serie A2	30	29.3	.495	.317	.808	2.3	3.7	**2.2**	.0	14.2
2009–10	(Italy) Prima Veroli	Serie A2	40	30.7	.557	.399	.860	2.4	4.1	1.2	.0	14.8
2010–11	(Czech Republic) ČEZ Nymburk	NBL	22	22.4	.500	.324	.940	2.8	2.5	.4	.0	11.2
2011–12	(Russia) Enisey	VTB	10	21.0	.383	.412	.800	1.4	2.4	.4	**.1**	6.8
2012	(Slovenia) Krka	1. SKL	16	24.6	.491	.361	.892	1.8	3.5	1.0	.0	10.0
2012–13	(Israel) Hapoel Eilat	IPL	27	25.0	.421	.377	.891	1.7	2.9	1.3	.0	12.0
2013–14	(Israel) Hapoel Eilat	IPL	36	24.8	.418	.388	.881	1.3	3.5	.5	.0	12.0
2014–15	(Israel) Hapoel Eilat	IPL	**44**	29.5	.417	.335	.912	2.1	3.6	1.1	.0	11.8
2015–16	(Israel) Hapoel Eilat	IPL	37	26.7	.363	.319	.890	1.3	4.0	.9	.0	9.3
2016–17	(Israel) Hapoel Eilat	IPL	35	16.3	.458	.450	.903	.7	1.2	.3	.0	9.1
2017–18	(Israel) Hapoel Eilat	IPL	34	13.4	.410	.364	.833	.8	1.6	.3	.0	5.4
2018–19	(Israel) Elitzur Yavne	INL	28	25.4	.475	.377	.820	1.7	3.4	.6	.1	10.4

Source: Basket.co.il & RealGM
