= Stipe Modrić =

Slovenian professional basketball coach (born 1979)

Zadar
- Position: Head coach
- League: Croatian League; ABA League

Personal information
- Born: 8 May 1979 (age 47) Sinj, SR Croatia, SFR Yugoslavia
- Listed height: 6 ft 10 in (2.08 m)

Career information
- Playing career: 1996–2018
- Coaching career: 2018–present

Career history

Playing
- 1996–1997: Alkar
- 1997–1998: Union Olimpija (2nd team)
- 1998–1999: Geoplin Slovan
- 1999–2003: Union Olimpija
- 2003: Ludwigsburg
- 2003–2006: Geoplin Slovan
- 2006: Cholet Basket
- 2007: Cedevita
- 2007–2008: Geoplin Slovan
- 2008–2009: Anwil Włocławek
- 2009–2010: Union Olimpija
- 2010–2011: Anwil Włocławek
- 2011–2012: Astrum Levice
- 2012–2014: Geoplin Slovan
- 2014—2015: Portorož
- 2015–2018: Ilirija

Coaching
- 2018–2019: Petrol Olimpija (assistant)
- 2019–2022: Ilirija (assistant)
- 2023–2026: Ilirija
- 2026–present: Zadar

Career highlights
- ABA League winner (2002); 2× Slovenian League champion (2001, 2002); 4× Slovenian Cup winner (2001–2003, 2010)

Stipe Modrić (pronounced [stǐːpe mǒːdritɕ]; born 8 May 1979) is a Croatian-Slovenian professional basketball coach and former player. He is the current head coach for Zadar of the Croatian League and the ABA League.

Born in Sinj to a Croat father, Modrić played at the position of forward and power forward. During his career, he had played for Alkar, Union Olimpija, Ludwigsburg, Geoplin Slovan, Cedevita, Anwil Włocławek, and Astrum Levice.

On 11 December 2012, he returned to Geoplin Slovan.

Modrić won the 2000–01 and 2001–02 Slovenian national championship with Olimpija. He also won the 2000, 2001 and 2002 Slovenian national cup with Olimpija, and won the 2001–02 ABA Goodyear League with the same team. He played in the 2000 Slovenian All Star game and was an occasional member of the Slovenia national team.
