= Daniel Vujasinović =

Slovenian basketball player

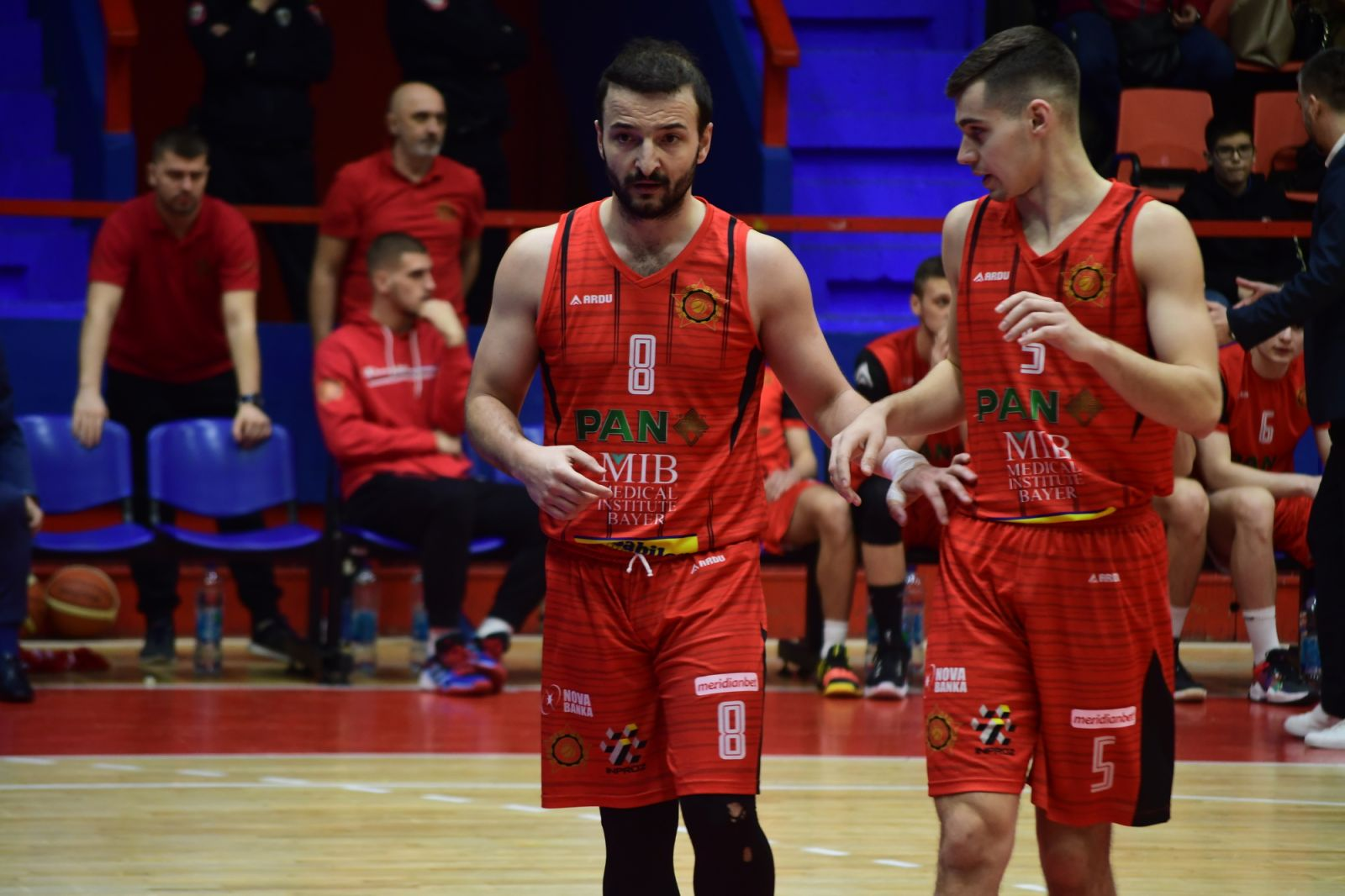
- Vujasinović (left) with Sloboda Tuzla in 2022.

No. 22 – KD Hopsi Polzela
- Position: Point guard
- League: Liga OTP banka

Personal information
- Born: 13 September 1989 (age 37) Zagreb, SFR Yugoslavia
- Listed height: 1.79 m (5 ft 10 in)
- Listed weight: 97 kg (214 lb)

Career information
- NBA draft: 2011: undrafted
- Playing career: 2004–present

Career history
- 2004–2006: Elektra Šoštanj
- 2006–2009: Hopsi Polzela
- 2009–2012: Zlatorog Laško
- 2012–2014: Hopsi Polzela
- 2014–2015: Básquet Coruña
- 2015–2016: Zlatorog Laško
- 2016–2017: Tajfun
- 2017–2019: Sixt Primorska
- 2019–2020: Rogaška
- 2020–2021: Helios Suns
- 2021–2022: Zdravlje
- 2022: Sloboda Tuzla
- 2022: Šentjur
- 2023: Zlatorog Laško
- 2023: Kvarner 2010
- 2024-present: KD Hopsi Polzela

Career highlights
- Slovenian League champion (2019); ABA League 2 champion (2019); 2x Slovenian Cup winner (2018, 2019); Croatian Second Division (2024)

Daniel Vujasinović (born 13 September 1989) is a Slovenian professional basketball player for Kvarner 2010 Rijeka. He is a 1.82 m (6 ft 0 in) tall point guard.

== Career ==
After spending several years in Slovenia, Vujasinović made a tryout with Bilbao Basket in 2009, but finally he came back to his native land.

In the 2012–13 and the 2013–14 Slovenian Basketball League seasons, Vujasinović finished as the top assistant.

In August 2014, Vujasinović signed for Spanish LEB Oro team Básquet Coruña for his first experience out of the Slovenian Basketball League.

On 20 June 2020 he signed with Helios Suns of the Slovenian League.

== International career ==
Vujasinović played the 2008 and 2009 Under-20 European championships with the Slovenian national team.
