= Saša Dončić =

Slovenian basketball player and coach (born 1974)

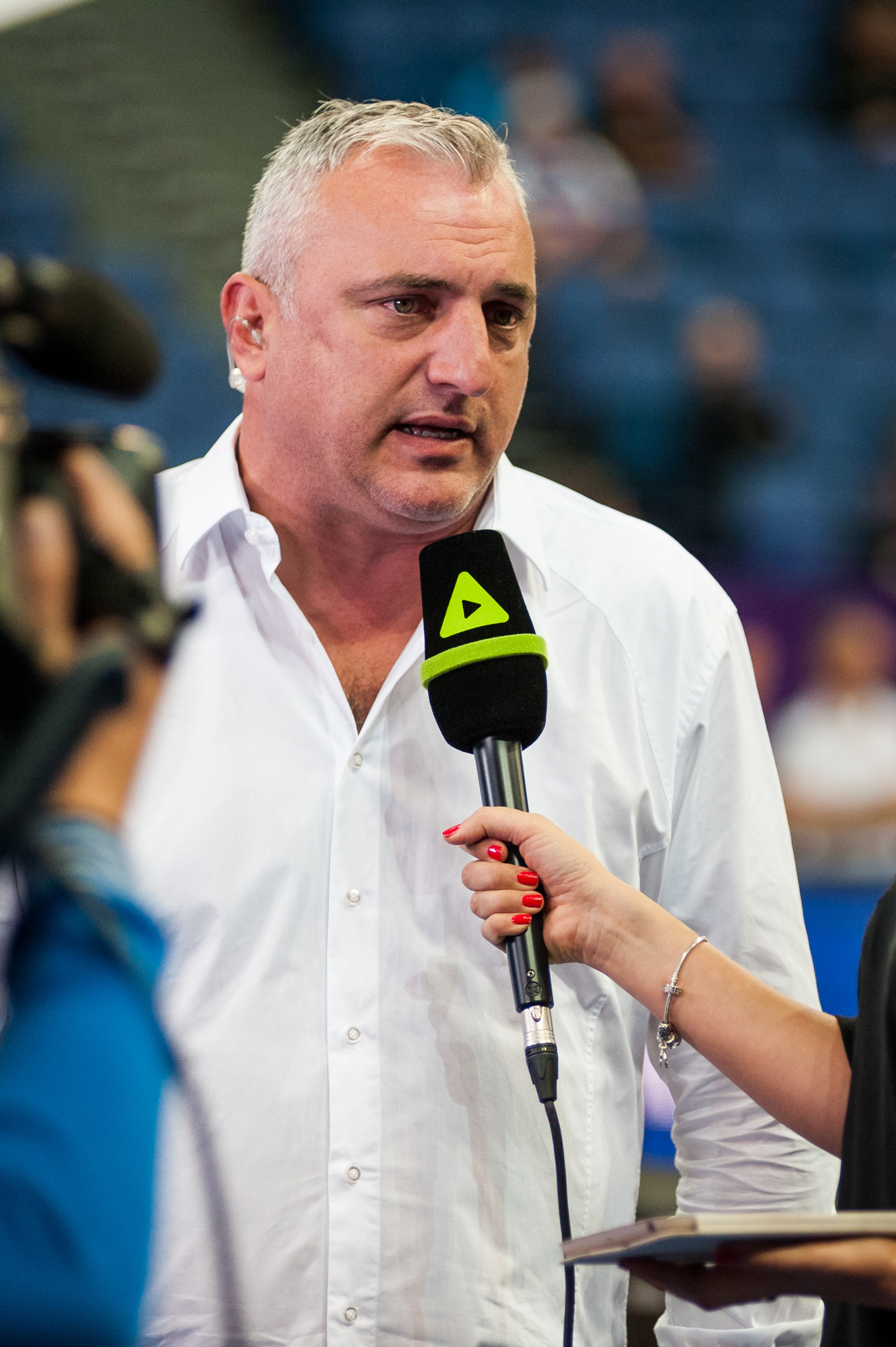
- Dončić, in Helsinki, during the EuroBasket 2017 tournament

Personal information
- Born: June 14, 1974 (age 52) Šempeter pri Gorici, SR Slovenia, SFR Yugoslavia
- Listed height: 6 ft 7.5 in (2.02 m)
- Listed weight: 234 lb (106 kg)

Career information
- Playing career: 1993–2010
- Position: Shooting guard / small forward
- Number: 4
- Coaching career: 2010–present

Career history

Playing
- 1993–1994: Ilirija
- 1994–1995: Postojna
- 1995–1996: Idrija
- 1996–1999: Pivovarna Laško
- 1999–2000: Loka Kava
- 2000–2001: Krka
- 2001: Loka Kava
- 2001–2002: Sloga Telekom Srbija
- 2002: ALM Évreux
- 2002–2003: Slovan
- 2003–2004: Pivovarna Laško
- 2004–2006: Slovan
- 2006–2007: Domžale
- 2007–2008: Olimpija
- 2008–2009: Slovan
- 2010: Avantgard Radovljica

Coaching
- 2010–2011: Avantgard Radovljica
- 2012–2013: Škofja Loka
- 2015: Slovenia B (assistant)
- 2015–2019: Ilirija
- 2019: Šentjur
- 2020–2022: Nutrisport Ilirija

Career highlights
- As player: 2× Slovenian League champion (2007, 2008); 3× Slovenian Cup winner (2004, 2007, 2008); Slovenian Supercup winner (2007); 6× Slovenian All-Star Game (2001, 2003, 2004, 2005, 2006, 2007); As coach: 2× 2. SKL champion (2017, 2021); 3. SKL champion (2016)

Saša Dončić (Serbian Cyrillic: Саша Дончић; born June 14, 1974) is a Serbian-Slovenian professional basketball coach and former player. He last served as head coach of Ilirija in the Slovenian League. He is the father of NBA player Luka Dončić.

As a player, Dončić started his professional career in Ilirija, Ljubljana in the 1992–1993 season and played in several clubs in Slovenia throughout his career that included international club appearances in Serbia and France. He mainly played at the shooting guard and small forward positions, but could also play at power forward if needed.

== Professional career ==
During his pro club career, Dončić won 2 Slovenian Premier A League championships (2007, 2008), and three Slovenian Cups, (2004, 2007, 2008). He also won the Slovenian Supercup, in 2007. He played in the European-wide top-tier-level league, the EuroLeague, during the 2007–08 season.

== National team career ==
Dončić was a member of the Yugoslavia national cadet team at the 1991 FIBA Europe Under-16 Championship in Greece. Over four tournament games, he averaged 2.0 points per game.

In 2004, he played in two games for the senior Slovenian national basketball team at the FIBA EuroBasket 2005 qualification.

== Coaching career ==
After retiring from playing professional basketball, Dončić began his career working as a basketball coach in 2010.

== Personal life ==
Dončić was born in Šempeter pri Gorici, Yugoslavia, now present-day Slovenia. His family is of Serbian descent.

He was married to Slovenian model and beauty salon owner Mirjam Poterbin, until their divorce in 2008. Their son Luka, who is also a professional basketball player, currently plays with the Los Angeles Lakers in the NBA.
