= Uroš Slokar =

Slovenian basketball player

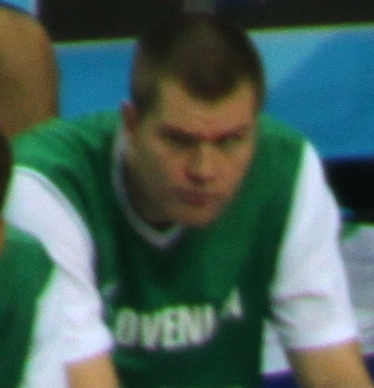

Personal information
- Born: 14 May 1983 (age 43) Ljubljana, SR Slovenia, Yugoslavia
- Listed height: 2.10 m (6 ft 11 in)
- Listed weight: 112 kg (247 lb)

Career information
- High school: Bežigrad (Ljubljana, Slovenia)
- NBA draft: 2005: 2nd round, 58th overall pick
- Drafted by: Toronto Raptors
- Playing career: 2001–2021
- Position: Power forward / center
- Number: 4, 5, 10, 55
- Coaching career: 2021–present

Career history

Playing
- 2001–2003: Slovan Ljubljana
- 2003–2005: Benetton Treviso
- 2005: Snaidero Udine
- 2005–2006: Benetton Treviso
- 2006–2007: Toronto Raptors
- 2007–2008: Triumph Lyubertsy
- 2008–2009: Fortitudo Bologna
- 2009–2010: Union Olimpija
- 2010: Montepaschi Siena
- 2010–2011: Assignia Manresa
- 2011–2012: Virtus Roma
- 2012–2013: Gran Canaria
- 2013: Alba Berlin
- 2013–2015: Estudiantes
- 2015–2016: Baloncesto Sevilla
- 2016: Juvecaserta Basket
- 2017: Pallacanestro Cantù
- 2018–2021: SAM Basket Massagno

Coaching
- 2021–present: SAM Basket Massagno (assistant)

Career highlights
- Slovenian League Rookie of the Year (2002); NBA Atlantic Division champion (2007); Slovenian SuperCup Championship (2009); 2× Italian champion (2006, 2010); 3× Italian Cup winner (2004, 2005, 2010); German Cup champion (2013); German Supercup champion (2013); As coach: Swiss League Cup champion (2023); Swiss Supercup champion (2023)
- Stats at NBA.com
- Stats at Basketball Reference

Uroš Slokar (Slovene pronunciation: [ˈurɔʃ ˈslokar]; born 14 May 1983) is a Slovenian former professional basketball player who last played for Pallacanestro Cantù of the Lega Basket Serie A.

== Professional career ==
After playing two seasons in the Slovenian basketball league, Slokar moved to Italy's Serie A in 2003, where he represented Benetton Treviso and Pallalcesto Amatori Udine. Upon his 2005 NBA draft selection by the Toronto Raptors (58th overall), he remained a further season in Europe. In his 2006-2007 NBA season the Raptors won a first ever Atlantic Division title.

On 16 August 2007 Slokar signed a one-year deal with Triumph Lyubertsy, formerly known as Dynamo Moscow Region, which plays in the Russian Super League and the European Eurocup. After one season in Russia, he returned to Italy and signed with Fortitudo Bologna for the next two years.

For the 2009–10 season he returned to Slovenia, where he played for Union Olimpija. He later left the club for Montepaschi Siena.

In October 2010 he signed with the Spanish League club Assignia Manresa.

In August 2011, he signed with Lottomatica Roma. One year later, in July 2012, he came back to Spain to play with CB Gran Canaria. On 31 October 2013 he signed a six-week contract with Alba Berlin.

On 16 December 2013 he signed a two-month deal with CB Estudiantes. On 18 February 2014 he was re-signed for the rest of the season. On 29 October 2014 he again re-signed with Estudiantes.

On 28 August 2015 he signed with Baloncesto Sevilla, ending his contract with the Andalusian club on 19 January 2016.

On 28 February 2016 Slokar signed with Serie A team Juvecaserta Basket for the rest of the season.

On 29 December 2016 Slokar signed with Pallacanestro Cantù for the remainder of the season.

== National team career ==
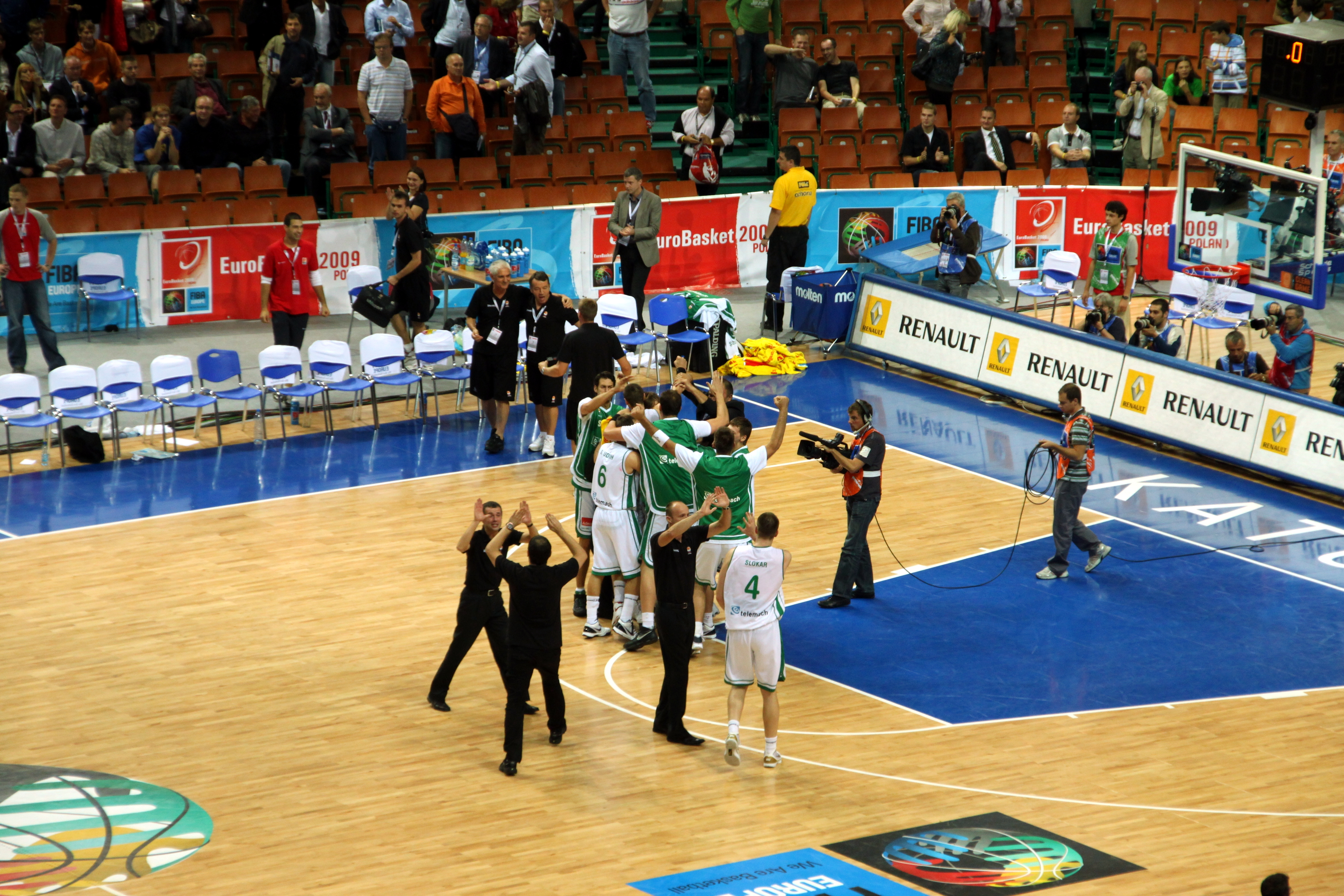
Slokar (#4) at EuroBasket 2009

Internationally, Slokar has played with Slovenia at the 1999 FIBA Europe Under-16 Championship, the 2000 FIBA Europe Under-18 Championship, the 2002 FIBA Europe Under-20 Championship, the 2005 FIBA European Championship, the 2007 FIBA European Championship, the 2009 FIBA European Championship, the 2011 FIBA European Championship, the 2013 FIBA European Championship, the 2015 FIBA European Championship, the FIBA World Olympic Qualifying Tournament for Men 2008, the 2006 FIBA World Championship, the 2010 FIBA World Championship and the 2014 FIBA World Championship.

== Career statistics ==
Legend
| GP | Games played | GS | Games started | MPG | Minutes per game |
| FG% | Field goal percentage | 3P% | 3-point field goal percentage | FT% | Free throw percentage |
| RPG | Rebounds per game | APG | Assists per game | SPG | Steals per game |
| BPG | Blocks per game | PPG | Points per game | **Bold** | Career high |

=== NBA ===
==== Regular season ====
| Year | Team | GP | GS | MPG | FG% | 3P% | FT% | RPG | APG | SPG | BPG | PPG |
|---|---|---|---|---|---|---|---|---|---|---|---|---|
| 2006–07 | Toronto | 20 | 0 | 3.6 | .538 | .500 | .692 | .7 | .1 | .1 | .1 | 1.9 |
| Career | | 20 | 0 | 3.6 | .538 | .500 | .692 | .7 | .1 | .1 | .1 | 1.9 |

== Awards and achievements ==
- Slovenian League Rookie of the Year (2002)
- Slovenian SuperCup Championship (2009)
- 2× Italian champion (2006, 2010)
- 3× Italian Cup winner (2004, 2005, 2010)
- German Cup champion (2013)
- German Supercup champion (2013)
