= KK Plama Pur =

- League: Slovenian Fourth League
- Founded: 1956; 70 years ago 1996; 30 years ago (refounded)
- Arena: OŠ Antona Žnideršiča Hall
- Location: Ilirska Bistrica, Slovenia
- Team colors: Blue, white
- Main sponsor: Plama-pur d.o.o.
- President: Edvin Godina
- Head coach: Sašo Ožbolt
- Website: kkplamapur.si
| Home | Away |

Košarkarski klub Plama Pur (English: Plama Pur Basketball Club) is a Slovenian basketball club based in Ilirska Bistrica that competes in the Slovenian Fourth League (4. SKL), the fourth tier of Slovenian basketball.

== History ==
The club was founded in 1956 as a basketball section of TVD Partizan Ilirska Bistrica. It was renamed as KK Lesonit in 1962. The club won the Slovenian Republic League in 1964 and qualified for the Yugoslav First Federal Basketball League. In the 1965 season of the Yugoslav First League, Lesonit won only one match, against KK Rabotnički Skopje, ending the season in last place with one win and 21 defeats in 22 matches. After being relegated from the Yugoslav First League, the club played another three seasons in the Yugoslav Second League before being relegated back to the Slovenian Republic League in 1969. It ceased to operate in the early 1980s, when basketball moved to indoor arenas and Ilirska Bistrica did not have adequate facilities. It was refounded in 1996 and is now named KK Plama Pur Ilirska Bistrica due to sponsorship reasons.

== Results in the Slovenian Second Basketball League ==
- 2013–14 – 2nd place (20 wins/6 losses)
- 2014–15 – 7th place (10 wins/12 losses)
- 2015–16 – 6th place (12 wins/10 losses)
- 2016–17 – 4th place (13 wins/9 losses)

== Honours ==
- Slovenian Republic League
  - Winners: 1964
