= Sašo Ožbolt =

Slovenian basketball player

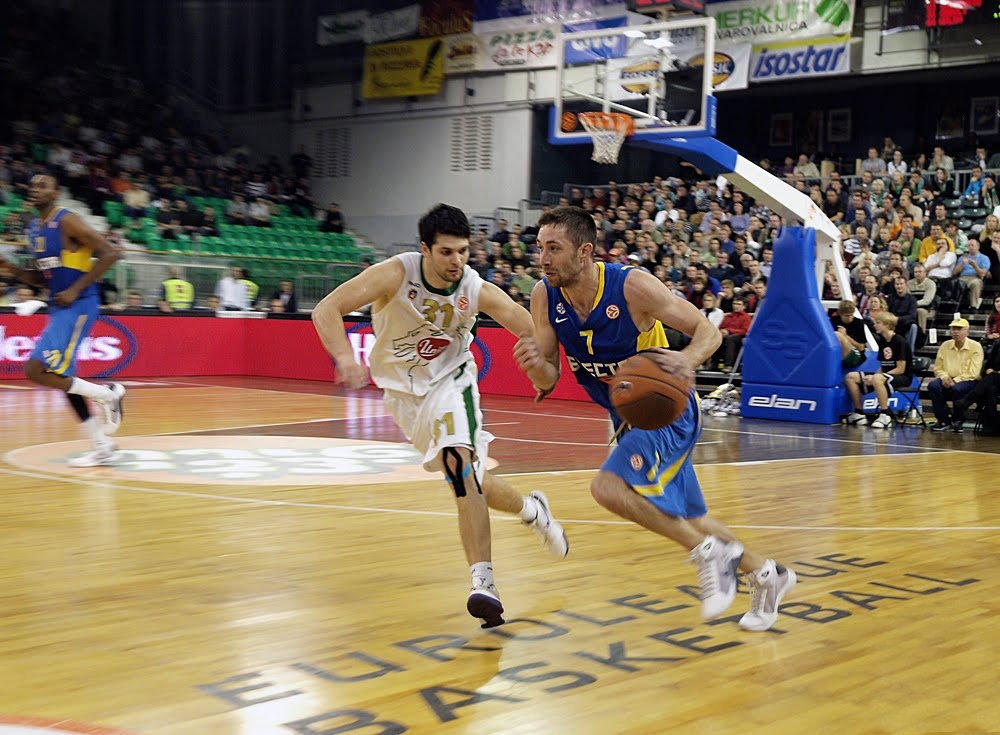
- Ožbolt (left) in 2009.

Plama Pur
- Title: Head coach
- League: Slovenian League

Personal information
- Born: 4 April 1981 (age 45) Dubrovnik, SR Croatia, SFR Yugoslavia
- Listed height: 6 ft 3 in (1.91 m)
- Listed weight: 187 lb (85 kg)

Career information
- NBA draft: 2003: undrafted
- Playing career: 2000–2015
- Position: Guard
- Number: 7

Career history

Playing
- –2000: Portorož
- 2000–2001: Triglav Kranj
- 2001–2011: Union Olimpija
- 2001–2002: → Geoplin Slovan
- 2011–2012: Zagreb
- 2012–2015: Portorož

Coaching
- 2015–2016: Portorož U19 / U17
- 2016–2017: Koper U19
- 2017–2022: Plama Pur (assistant)
- 2017–present: Plama Pur U19
- 2022–present: Plama Pur

Career highlights
- 5× Slovenian League champion (2004–2006, 2008–2009); 7× Slovenian Cup winner (2003, 2005–2006, 2008–2011); 2× Slovenian Cup MVP (2005, 2011)

Sašo Ožbolt (born 4 April 1981) is a Slovenian retired professional basketball player who played for KK Portorož of the Slovenian League. He represented the Slovenian national basketball team at the 2006 FIBA World Championship and Eurobasket 2011.
