= Leon Stergar =

Slovenian basketball player

No. 37 – Limoges CSP
- Position: Shooting guard
- League: LNB Élite

Personal information
- Born: March 17, 2000 (age 26) Brežice, Slovenia
- Listed height: 1.93 m (6 ft 4 in)

Career information
- NBA draft: 2022: undrafted
- Playing career: 2016–present

Career history
- 2016–2018: Krško
- 2018–2024: Krka
- 2019–2020: →Terme Olimia Podčetrtek
- 2024–2025: Kortrijk Spurs
- 2025–present: Limoges CSP

Career highlights
- Slovenian Cup winner (2021)

Leon Stergar (born March 17, 2000) is a Slovenian professional basketball player for Limoges of the LNB Élite. He is a 1.93 m tall shooting guard.

== Professional career ==
Stergar started playing professional basketball for Krško.

In August 2018, Stergar signed a contract with Krka.

On August 23, 2024, he signed with Kortrijk Spurs of the BNXT League.

On July 15, 2025, he signed with Limoges CSP of the LNB Pro A.
