= Boban Tomić =

Slovenian basketball player

BC Komárno
- Title: President/General manager
- League: Eurovia SBL

Personal information
- Born: May 30, 1988 (age 38) Ljubljana, SFR Yugoslavia
- Listed height: 1.90 m (6 ft 3 in)

Career information
- NBA draft: 2010: undrafted
- Playing career: 2006–2019
- Position: Point guard

Career history

Playing
- 2005–2006: Union Olimpija mladi
- 2006–2007: Postojna
- 2007–2008: Hrastnik
- 2008–2009: Postojna
- 2009–2010: LTH Cast Mercator
- 2010–2012: Rogaška
- 2012: LTH Castings Mercator
- 2013: Rogaška
- 2013–2014: Falco KC Szombathely
- 2014–2015: Grosbasket
- 2015: UBSC Raiffeisen Graz
- 2015–2016: Krka
- 2016–2018: Rieker Komárno
- 2018–2019: Levickí Patrioti
- 2019: Petrol Olimpija
- 2019: Rieker Komárno

Coaching
- 2020–2021: BC Komárno

Career highlights
- Alpe Adria Cup (2017)

Boban Tomić (born May 30, 1988) is a Slovenian basketball executive, who is currently president of BC Komárno, Eurovia SBL, and former professional basketball player who last played for Rieker Komárno. He is a 1.90 m tall point guard.
