= Ante Đugum =

Croatian basketball player (born 1988)

Personal information
- Born: March 11, 1988 (age 38) Makarska, SR Croatia, SFR Yugoslavia
- Listed height: 6 ft 11 in (2.11 m)

Career information
- Playing career: 2006–2018
- Position: Center

Career history
- 2006–2008: Zadar
- 2007–2008: → Borik Puntamika
- 2008–2009: Borik Puntamika
- 2009–2010: Kapfenberg Bulls
- 2010: Brotnjo
- 2011: Kapfenberg Bulls
- 2011–2012: Geoplin Slovan
- 2012–2013: Zlatorog Laško
- 2013–2014: Zadar
- 2014–2016: Split
- 2016–2017: Široki
- 2017–2018: Ribola Kaštela

Ante Đugum (born June 20, 1988) is a Croatian former professional basketball player. Standing at 2.11 m, he played at the center position.

Đugum, a native of Vrgorac, played in the Zadar junior team and as a promising young player made his debut for the senior team in the 2006–07 season. He did not manage to establish himself in Zadar's senior team and did not spend much time on court in his first professional season. The next season, he spent on loan in Borik Puntamika. In the summer of 2008 he signed a contract with Cedevita Zagreb but never played for the team. The contract was canceled after only a few weeks. In the autumn of 2008, now as a free player, Đugum returns to Borik Puntamika. The 2009–10 season and part of the 2010-11 he spent in the Austrian League playing for the Kapfenberg Bulls. Part of the 2010–11 season he played for Brotnjo in the Bosnian League. In 2011 he moves to the Slovenian League. In Zlatorog Laško, for the first time in his professional career, Đugum spent a considerable amount of time on court and played a major role in his team's performances. The 2011–12 season he spent in Geoplin Slovan. In the summer of 2013 he signed a three-year contract with Zadar. In September 2014 he moved to KK Split. After two seasons in Split, he moved to Široki of the Bosnian League. In July 2017 he moved back to the Croatian League joining Ribola Kaštela.

Đugum played for the Croatian national team youth selections. He played at the 2004 European U-16 Championship, the 2006 European U-18 Championship and the 2008 European U-20 Championship.
