= Slovenia men's national basketball team =

Slovenia
- FIBA ranking: 14 (1 September 2026)
- Joined FIBA: 1992
- FIBA zone: FIBA Europe
- National federation: KZS
- Coach: Aleksander Sekulić

Olympic Games
- Appearances: 1

FIBA World Cup
- Appearances: 4

EuroBasket
- Appearances: 15
- Medals: (gold) Gold: (2017)
Home	Away

First international
- Slovenia 83–54 Bulgaria (Bilbao, Spain; 22 June 1992)

Biggest win
- Slovenia 122–67 Moldova (Wrocław, Poland; 1 June 1993)

Biggest defeat
- Slovenia 76–119 United States (Barcelona, Spain; 9 September 2014)
Medal record
EuroBasket
Gold medal – first place	2017 Turkey

The Slovenia men's national basketball team (Slovene: Slovenska košarkarska reprezentanca) represents Slovenia in international basketball competitions, and is managed by the Basketball Federation of Slovenia. Since the independence of Slovenia in 1991, the national team has competed at every EuroBasket, and reached the knockout stage at every championship since 2005. Their greatest achievement overall at the tournament came at EuroBasket 2017, where they won all nine games and became European champions.

As of September 2026, Slovenia is ranked 14th in the FIBA World Ranking.

== History ==
Before Slovenia's independence in 1991, Slovenian players represented Yugoslavia. Slovenia joined the International Basketball Federation in 1992 and played its first official game on 22 June 1992 against Bulgaria in the qualification rounds for the 1992 Summer Olympics.

=== FIBA World Cup ===
Slovenia debuted at the FIBA Basketball World Cup in 2006 after qualifying as the sixth-placed team of the EuroBasket 2005. In the 2010, 2014 and 2023 editions, Slovenia reached the quarter-finals; their highest overall finish is seventh place, achieved in 2014 and 2023.

=== EuroBasket ===
Between May and June 1993, Slovenia competed in the qualifiers for the EuroBasket 1993, where the team won all seven games and therefore qualified for its first EuroBasket. At the main tournament, held in Germany, Slovenia finished in 14th place out of 16 teams with one win and two defeats.

Slovenia did not reach the knockout stages of the competition until the 2005 edition, where the team, coached by Aleš Pipan, reached the quarter-finals for the first time. In 2009, Slovenia reached the semi-finals for the first time after eliminating Croatia in the quarter-finals with a 67–65 victory. In the semi-finals, Slovenia lost to Serbia after overtime, and later to Greece in the third place game, finishing the competition in fourth place. In the next two tournaments, in 2011 and 2013, Slovenia was eliminated in the quarter-finals by Spain and France, respectively. In 2015, Slovenia failed to reach the quarter-finals for the first time since the 2003 edition after losing to Latvia in the round of 16.

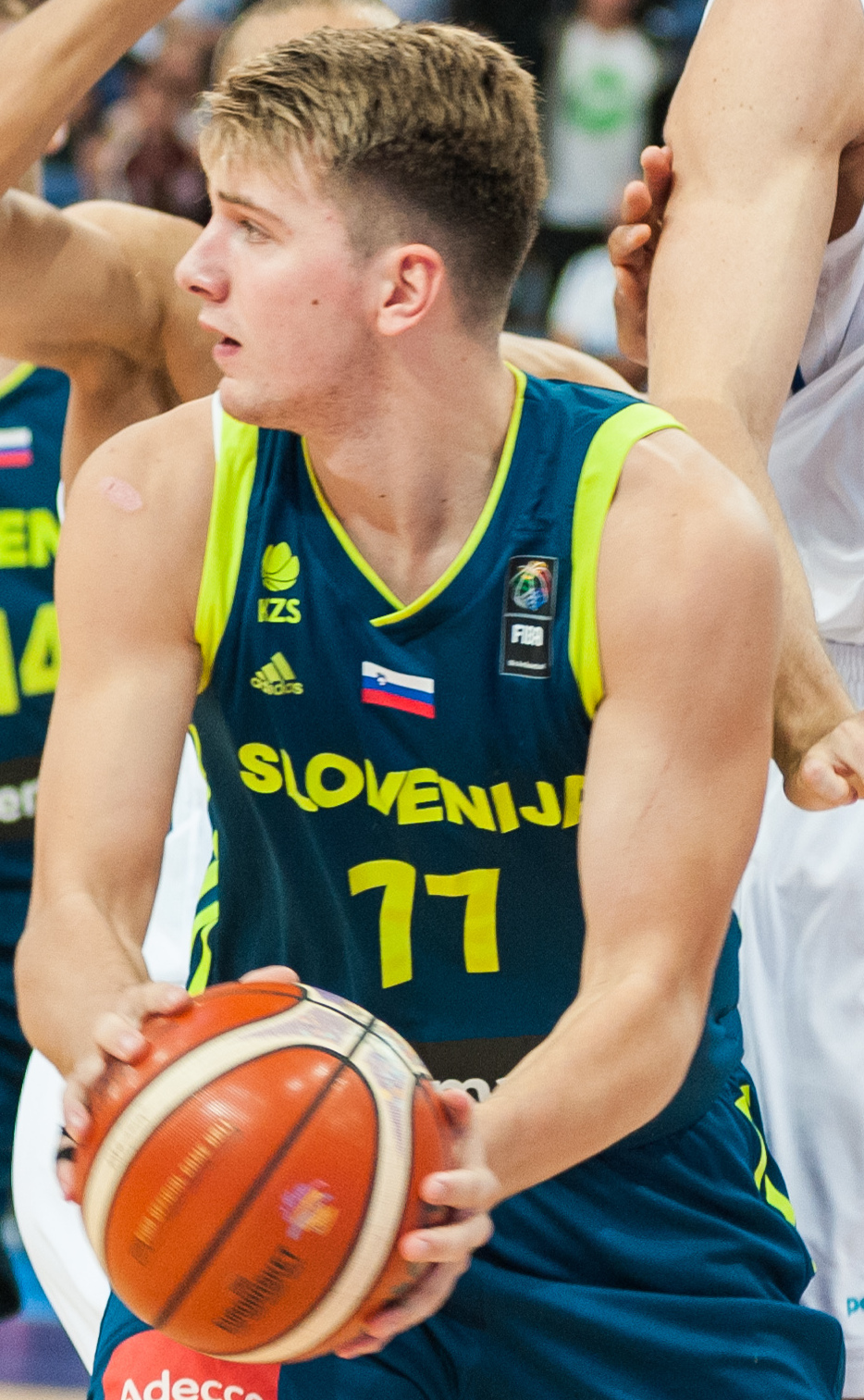
Luka Dončić was the best scorer of Slovenia at the 2020 Olympics, and was also selected in the All-Star Team.

At EuroBasket 2017, Slovenia, captained by Goran Dragić and managed by Igor Kokoškov, won the championship after winning nine consecutive games, including victories against the 2013 winners France and the 2015 winners Spain. Dragić, who scored 35 points in the final against Serbia, was named the most valuable player of the tournament.

=== 2020 Summer Olympics ===
Slovenia qualified for the men's basketball tournament at the 2020 Summer Olympics after competing in the 2020 FIBA Men's Olympic Qualifying Tournaments, winning the tournament in Kaunas. They won all games in the Group B, defeating Poland and Angola. In the Final round, they defeated Venezuela 98–70, and qualified for the final against Lithuania. Slovenia defeated Lithuania 96–85 in Kaunas, led by Luka Dončić (31 points, 11 rebounds, 13 assists), who with his triple-double sent Slovenia to their first Olympic appearance. Dončić was also proclaimed as the MVP of the tournament.

At the Olympics, Slovenia was drawn in the group with the host Japan, Argentina, and reigning world champion Spain. In the opening game, they beat Argentina 118–100. With his 48 points in this game, Dončić tied with Eddie Palubinskas for the second highest points scored in a match in the history of the Olympics. In the next game Slovenia defeated host Japan 116–81. In the final match of the group stage, Slovenia faced Spain, the reigning world champions, and beat them 95–87. Mike Tobey, who was named player of the day by FIBA, recorded a double-double with 16 points and 14 rebounds, while Klemen Prepelič scored the crucial three-pointer that put Slovenia ahead 86–85 two and a half minutes before the end.

The win gave them the group's top seed, and they were set to face Germany in the quarter-finals. Slovenia won their quarter-final, defeating Germany 94–70. Slovenia then lost the dramatic semi-final against France by one point, 90–89. In the last seconds of the game, Nicolas Batum blocked Prepelič's layup attempt, thus preventing Slovenia from reaching the final. In the bronze medal game, Slovenia played against Australia, and lost 107–93. Thus, the team finished its inaugural Olympic tournament in fourth place, and Dončić was selected in the All-Star Team of the tournament.

== Competitive record ==
Key

Champions As host

=== FIBA World Cup ===
World Cup					Qualification		
Year	Position	Pld	W	L	Pld	W	L
1994	Did not qualify				EuroBasket served as qualifiers		
1998	Did not qualify				EuroBasket served as qualifiers		
2002	Did not qualify				EuroBasket served as qualifiers		
2006	9th	6	2	4	EuroBasket served as qualifiers		
2010	8th	9	5	4	EuroBasket served as qualifiers		
2014	7th	7	5	2	EuroBasket served as qualifiers		
2019	Did not qualify				12	3	9
2023	7th	8	5	3	12	7	5
2027	To be determined				To be determined		
Total		30	17	13	24	10	14

=== Olympic Games ===
Olympic Games					Qualifying		
Year	Position	Pld	W	L	Pld	W	L
1992	Did not qualify				11	7	4
1996	Did not qualify				Qualifiers not held		
2000	Did not qualify				Qualifiers not held		
2004	Did not qualify				Qualifiers not held		
2008	Did not qualify				3	2	1
2012	Did not qualify				Did not qualify		
2016	Did not qualify				Did not qualify		
2020	4th	6	4	2	4	4	0
2024	Did not qualify				3	1	2
Total		6	4	2	21	14	7

=== EuroBasket ===
EuroBasket					Qualification		
Year	Position	Pld	W	L	Pld	W	L
1993	14th	3	1	2	7	7	0
1995	12th	6	2	4	6	5	1
1997	14th	5	1	4	10	7	3
1999	10th	6	2	4	10	9	1
2001	15th	3	1	2	10	9	1
2003	10th	4	2	2	10	7	3
2005	6th	6	4	2	6	5	1
2007	7th	9	6	3	Directly qualified		
2009	4th	9	6	3	Directly qualified		
2011	7th	11	6	5	Directly qualified		
2013	5th	11	7	4	Qualified as host		
2015	12th	6	3	3	Directly qualified		
2017	1st	9	9	0	6	6	0
2022	6th	7	5	2	6	4	2
2025	7th	7	4	3	6	4	2
2029	Qualified						
Total		102	59	43	77	63	14

==== Record against other teams at World Cup ====
Country	W–L
Australia	3–0
Angola	1–0
Brazil	1–0
Cape Verde	1–0
Croatia	1–0
Dominican Republic	1–0
(Georgia (country)) Georgia	1–0
Iran	1–0
Mexico	1–0
Puerto Rico	1–0
Senegal	1–0
South Korea	1–0
Tunisia	1–0
Venezuela	1–0
Italy	1–1
Canada	0–1
China	0–1
Germany	0–1
Russia	0–1
Spain	0–1
Lithuania	0–2
Turkey	0–2
United States	0–3
Total	17–13

Last updated: 9 September 2023

==== Record against other teams at EuroBasket ====
Country	W–L
Italy	4–0
Turkey	4–0
(Georgia (country)) Georgia	3–0
Serbia (Note: Includes FR Yugoslavia.)	4–2
Belgium	3–1
Bosnia and Herzegovina	3–1
Finland	3–1
Ukraine	3–1
Hungary	2–0
Iceland	2–0
Bulgaria	1–0
Czech Republic	1–0
Estonia	1–0
(United Kingdom) Great Britain	1–0
Netherlands	1–0
Poland	3–3
North Macedonia	1–1
France	5–6
Greece	3–4
Spain	3–4
Croatia	2–3
Latvia	1–2
Germany	2–4
Lithuania	2–4
Israel	1–3
Russia	0–3
Total	59–43

Last updated: 10 September 2025

== Team ==
=== EuroBasket 2025 roster ===
The following 12 players were selected for EuroBasket 2025.

Slovenia men's national basketball team – EuroBasket 2025 roster
Players
Coaches

Pos.	No.	Name	Age – Date of birth	Height	Club	Ctr.
PF	2	Martin Krampelj	30 – 10 March 1995	2.06 m (6 ft 9 in)	Bilbao	(Spain)
PG	4	Mark Padjen	19 – 25 January 2006	1.98 m (6 ft 6 in)	Ilirija	(Slovenia)
PG	6	Aleksej Nikolić	30 – 21 February 1995	1.91 m (6 ft 3 in)	Cedevita Olimpija	(Slovenia)
SG	7	Klemen Prepelič	32 – 20 October 1992	1.91 m (6 ft 3 in)	Dubai Basketball	(United Arab Emirates)
F	8	Edo Murić	33 – 27 November 1991	2.02 m (6 ft 8 in)	Ilirija	(Slovenia)
F	12	Rok Radović	24 – 4 February 2001	2.01 m (6 ft 7 in)	Cedevita Olimpija	(Slovenia)
C	13	Robert Jurković	23 – 14 June 2002	2.07 m (6 ft 9 in)	Ilirija	(Slovenia)
SF	15	Gregor Hrovat	31 – 18 August 1994	1.96 m (6 ft 5 in)	JDA Dijon	(France)
F	23	Luka Ščuka	23 – 23 May 2002	2.09 m (6 ft 10 in)	Löwen Braunschweig	(Germany)
C	24	Alen Omić (N)	33 – 6 May 1992	2.16 m (7 ft 1 in)	KK Budućnost	(Montenegro)
SG	37	Leon Stergar	25 – 17 March 2000	1.93 m (6 ft 4 in)	Limoges CSP	(France)
SG	77	Luka Dončić (C)	26 – 28 February 1999	2.01 m (6 ft 7 in)	Los Angeles Lakers	(United States)

Head coach

- (Slovenia) Aleksander Sekulić

Assistant coach(es)

- (Slovenia) Luka Bassin
- (Slovenia) Dejan Mihevc
- (Slovenia) Domen Zevnik

Legend

- **(C)** Team captain
- **(N)** Naturalised player
- **Club** – describes last
  club before the tournament
- **Age** – describes age
  on 27 August 2025

=== Head coaches ===
Since 1992, the Slovenia national team has been managed by a total of twelve head coaches. Zmago Sagadin and Jure Zdovc are the only coaches with more than one spell.

1990s and 2000s

Years	Name	Achievements
1992	Zmago Sagadin	—
1993	Janez Drvarič	1993 EuroBasket (14th place)
1994–1995	Zmago Sagadin	1995 EuroBasket (12th place)
1996–1998	Andrej Urlep	1997 EuroBasket (14th place)
1998–2001	Boris Zrinski	1999 EuroBasket (10th place); 2001 EuroBasket (15th place)
2002–2003	Slobodan Subotić	2003 EuroBasket (10th place)
2004–2008	Aleš Pipan	2005 EuroBasket (6th place); 2006 World Cup (9th place); 2007 EuroBasket (7th place)
2009	Jure Zdovc	2009 EuroBasket (4th place)

2010s and 2020s

Years	Name	Achievements
2010	Memi Bečirovič	2010 World Cup (8th place)
2011–2013	Božidar Maljković	2011 EuroBasket (7th place); 2013 EuroBasket (5th place)
2014–2015	Jure Zdovc	2014 World Cup (7th place); 2015 EuroBasket (12th place)
2016–2017	Igor Kokoškov	2017 EuroBasket (Champions)
2017–2020	Rado Trifunović	—
2020–present	Aleksander Sekulić	2020 Summer Olympics (4th place); 2022 EuroBasket (6th place); 2023 World Cup (7th place); 2025 EuroBasket (7th place)

=== Statistics ===
Players in **bold** are still active with Slovenia.

==== Most appearances ====
No.	Name	Years	Caps
1	**Edo Murić**	2011–	102
2	Goran Dragić	2006–2022	90
3	Jaka Lakovič	2001–2013	86
4	**Klemen Prepelič**	2014–	83
5	Jaka Blažič	2013–2024	82
6	Zoran Dragić	2011–2024	77
7	Uroš Slokar	2005–2015	76
8	Goran Jagodnik	1997–2011	75
9	Marijan Kraljević	1992–2003	73
10	Jaka Daneu	1992–1999	67
10	Boris Gorenc	1992–2003	67

As of 31 August 2026. Statistics include official competitive matches only.

==== Top scorers ====
No.	Name	Years	Points	Caps	Points per game
1	**Luka Dončić**	2017–	1,181	48	24.6
2	Goran Dragić	2006–2022	1,095	90	12.2
3	**Klemen Prepelič**	2014–	1,051	83	12.7
4	Teoman Alibegović	1992–2000	990	52	19
5	Jaka Lakovič	2001–2013	880	86	10.2
6	Jure Zdovc	1992–2000	755	53	14.2
7	Zoran Dragić	2011–2024	750	77	9.7
8	Jaka Blažič	2013–2024	728	82	8.9
9	Boštjan Nachbar	1999–2013	627	58	10.8
10	Boris Gorenc	1992–2003	620	67	9.3

As of 31 August 2026. Statistics include official competitive matches only.

=== Retired numbers ===
The Basketball Federation of Slovenia retired Goran Dragić' jersey number 3 ahead of his farewell game on 23 August 2024.

**Slovenia national team retired numbers**
Number	Player	Position	Tenure	Date
3	Goran Dragić	Guard	2006–2022	23 August 2024

=== Past rosters ===
1993 EuroBasket: finished 14th among 16 teams

4 Roman Horvat, 5 Marko Tušek, 6 Jaka Daneu, 7 Darko Mirt, 8 Primoz Bačar, 9 Jure Zdovc, 10 Boštjan Leban, 11 Teoman Alibegović, 12 Boris Gorenc, 13 Marijan Kraljević, 14 Slavko Kotnik, 15 Žarko Durisić (Coach: Janez Drvarič)

1995 EuroBasket: finished 12th among 14 teams

4 Roman Horvat, 5 Matjaž Tovornik, 6 Jaka Daneu, 7 Walter Jeklin, 8 Marijan Kraljević, 9 Jure Zdovc, 10 Marko Tušek, 11 Teoman Alibegović, 12 Marko Milič, 13 Boris Gorenc, 14 Slavko Kotnik, 15 Aleš Kunc (Coach: Zmago Sagadin)

1997 EuroBasket: finished 14th among 16 teams

4 Walter Jeklin, 5 Goran Jagodnik, 6 Jaka Daneu, 7 Radoslav Nesterović, 8 Aleš Kunc, 9 Jure Zdovc, 10 Marko Tušek, 11 Teoman Alibegović, 12 Marko Milič, 13 Boris Gorenc, 14 Ivica Jurković, 15 Radovan Trifunović (Coach: Andrej Urlep)

1999 EuroBasket: finished 10th among 16 teams

4 Jure Zdovc, 5 Walter Jeklin, 6 Jaka Daneu, 7 Sani Bečirović, 8 Marijan Kraljević, 9 Matjaž Tovornik, 10 Matjaž Smodiš, 11 Goran Jagodnik, 12 Marko Milič, 13 Ivica Jurković, 14 Radoslav Nesterović, 15 Ervin Dragsič (Coach: Boris Zrinski)

2001 EuroBasket: finished 15th among 16 teams

4 Beno Udrih, 5 Jaka Lakovič, 6 Boris Gorenc, 7 Sani Bečirović, 8 Marijan Kraljević, 9 Matjaž Smodiš, 10 Marko Tušek, 11 Goran Jagodnik, 12 Marko Milič, 13 Ivica Jurković, 14 Ariel McDonald, 15 Radoslav Nesterović (Coach: Boris Zrinski)

2003 EuroBasket: finished 10th among 16 teams

4 Goran Jurak, 5 Jaka Lakovič, 6 Boris Gorenc, 7 Simon Petrov, 8 Marijan Kraljević, 9 Boštjan Nachbar, 10 Slavko Duščak, 11 Marko Tušek, 12 Marko Milič, 13 Ivica Jurković, 14 Jurica Golemac, 15 Primož Brezec (Coach: Slobodan Subotić)

2005 EuroBasket: finished 6th among 16 teams

4 Goran Jurak, 5 Jaka Lakovič, 6 Aleksandar Ćapin, 7 Sani Bečirović, 8 Radoslav Nesterović, 9 Nebojša Joksimović, 10 Boštjan Nachbar, 11 Erazem Lorbek, 12 Marko Milič, 13 Marko Maravič, 14 Uroš Slokar, 15 Primož Brezec (Coach: Aleš Pipan)

2006 FIBA World Cup: finished 9th among 24 teams

4 Goran Jurak, 5 Jaka Lakovič, 6 Sašo Ožbolt, 7 Sani Bečirović, 8 Radoslav Nesterović, 9 Beno Udrih, 10 Boštjan Nachbar, 11 Željko Zagorac, 12 Marko Milič, 13 Goran Dragić, 14 Uroš Slokar, 15 Primož Brezec (Coach: Aleš Pipan)

2007 EuroBasket: finished 7th among 16 teams

4 Sandi Čebular, 5 Jaka Lakovič, 6 Aleksandar Ćapin, 7 Goran Dragić, 8 Radoslav Nesterović, 9 Matjaž Smodiš, 10 Uroš Slokar, 11 Jaka Klobučar, 12 Goran Jagodnik, 13 Domen Lorbek, 14 Gašper Vidmar, 15 Erazem Lorbek (Coach: Aleš Pipan)

2009 EuroBasket: finished 4th among 16 teams

4 Uroš Slokar, 5 Jaka Lakovič, 6 Samo Udrih, 7 Primož Brezec, 8 Matjaž Smodiš (C), 9 Jaka Klobučar, 10 Boštjan Nachbar, 11 Goran Dragić, 12 Goran Jagodnik, 13 Domen Lorbek, 14 Jurica Golemac, 15 Erazem Lorbek (Coach: Jure Zdovc)

2010 FIBA World Cup: finished 8th among 24 teams

4 Uroš Slokar, 5 Jaka Lakovič (C), 6 Hasan Rizvić, 7 Sani Bečirović, 8 Jaka Klobučar, 9 Samo Udrih, 10 Boštjan Nachbar, 11 Goran Dragić, 12 Goran Jagodnik, 13 Miha Zupan, 14 Gašper Vidmar, 15 Primož Brezec (Coach: Memi Bečirović)

2011 EuroBasket: finished 7th among 24 teams

4 Uroš Slokar, 5 Jaka Lakovič (C), 6 Luka Rupnik, 7 Sašo Ožbolt, 8 Matjaž Smodiš, 9 Samo Udrih, 10 Edo Murić, 11 Goran Dragić, 12 Goran Jagodnik, 13 Zoran Dragić, 14 Mirza Begić, 15 Erazem Lorbek (Coach: Božidar Maljković)

2013 EuroBasket: finished 5th among 24 teams

4 Uroš Slokar, 5 Jaka Lakovič (C), 6 Jure Balažič, 7 Nebojša Joksimović, 8 Edo Murić, 9 Jaka Blažič, 10 Boštjan Nachbar, 11 Goran Dragić, 12 Zoran Dragić, 13 Domen Lorbek, 14 Gašper Vidmar, 15 Mirza Begić (Coach: Božidar Maljković)

2014 FIBA World Cup: finished 7th among 24 teams

4 Jure Balažič, 5 Uroš Slokar, 6 Aleksej Nikolić, 7 Klemen Prepelič, 8 Edo Murić, 9 Jaka Blažič, 10 Miha Zupan, 11 Goran Dragić (C), 12 Zoran Dragić, 13 Domen Lorbek, 14 Jaka Klobučar, 15 Alen Omić (Coach: Jure Zdovc)

2015 EuroBasket: finished 12th among 24 teams

1 Nebojša Joksimović, 5 Luka Rupnik, 7 Klemen Prepelič, 9 Jaka Blažič, 10 Mitja Nikolić, 12 Zoran Dragić, 13 Miha Zupan, 15 Jure Balažič (C), 17 Saša Zagorac, 23 Alen Omić, 24 Jaka Klobučar, 55 Uroš Slokar (Coach: Jure Zdovc)

2017 EuroBasket: finished 1st (gold) among 24 teams

0 Anthony Randolph, 1 Matic Rebec, 3 Goran Dragić (C) & (MVP), 6 Aleksej Nikolić, 7 Klemen Prepelič, 8 Edo Murić, 9 Jaka Blažič, 14 Gašper Vidmar, 17 Saša Zagorac, 22 Žiga Dimec, 31 Vlatko Čančar, 77 Luka Dončić (Coach: Igor Kokoškov)

2020 Olympic Games: finished 4th among 12 teams

5 Luka Rupnik, 6 Aleksej Nikolić, 7 Klemen Prepelič, 8 Edo Murić (C), 10 Mike Tobey, 11 Jaka Blažič, 15 Gregor Hrovat, 27 Žiga Dimec, 30 Zoran Dragić, 31 Vlatko Čančar, 55 Jakob Čebašek, 77 Luka Dončić (Coach: Aleksander Sekulić)

2022 EuroBasket: finished 6th among 24 teams

3 Goran Dragić (C), 4 Žiga Samar, 5 Luka Rupnik, 6 Aleksej Nikolić, 7 Klemen Prepelič, 8 Edo Murić, 10 Mike Tobey, 11 Jaka Blažič, 27 Žiga Dimec, 30 Zoran Dragić, 31 Vlatko Čančar, 77 Luka Dončić (Coach: Aleksander Sekulić)

2023 FIBA World Cup: finished 7th among 32 teams

4 Žiga Samar, 6 Aleksej Nikolić, 7 Klemen Prepelič, 10 Mike Tobey, 11 Jaka Blažič, 15 Gregor Hrovat, 27 Žiga Dimec, 30 Zoran Dragić, 32 Bine Prepelič, 33 Gregor Glas, 55 Jakob Čebašek, 77 Luka Dončić (C) (Coach: Aleksander Sekulić)

2025 EuroBasket: finished 7th among 24 teams

2 Martin Krampelj, 4 Mark Padjen, 6 Aleksej Nikolić, 7 Klemen Prepelič, 8 Edo Murić, 12 Rok Radović, 13 Robert Jurković, 15 Gregor Hrovat, 23 Luka Ščuka, 24 Alen Omić, 37 Leon Stergar, 77 Luka Dončić (C) (Coach: Aleksander Sekulić)

== See also ==
- Slovenia women's national basketball team
- Slovenia men's national under-20 basketball team
- Slovenia men's national under-19 basketball team
- Slovenia men's national under-16 and under-17 basketball team
