= Jan Močnik =

Slovenian basketball player

Personal information
- Born: 27 March 1987 (age 39) Šempeter pri Gorici, SFR Yugoslavia
- Listed height: 5 ft 8.5 in (1.74 m)

Career information
- NBA draft: 2009: undrafted
- Playing career: 2002–2023
- Position: Point Guard

Career history
- 2002–2003: Nova Gorica
- 2003–2006: Kraški zidar Sežana
- 2006–2007: Nova Gorica
- 2007–2008: Union Olimpija
- 2008–2009: PBG Basket Poznań
- 2009: Epic Misel Postojna
- 2009–2010: Snaidero Udine
- 2011–2013: Union Olimpija
- 2014: Slovan
- 2014: Maribor Nova KBM
- 2014: KB Peja
- 2014–2016: Helios Suns
- 2016–2017: HKK Široki
- 2017–2019: BK Olomoucko
- 2019–2023: Gorica

Career highlights
- 2× Slovenian League champion (2008, 2016); 3× Slovenian Cup winner (2008, 2012, 2013); Alpe Adria Cup (2016)

Jan Močnik (born 27 March 1987) is a Slovenian retired professional basketball player.

== Professional career ==
Močnik grew up in Nova Gorica, where he played for local team KK Nova Gorica in the Slovenian second division. He left the team for Kraški zidar Sežana in 2003 and stayed there for three years, before returning to Nova Gorica.

=== Union Olimpija ===
In the 2007–08 season, Močnik signed with the Slovenian Basketball League, Adriatic League and Euroleague club Union Olimpija on a three-year contract. During the 2007–08 season, he won the Slovenian League championship and Slovenian Basketball Cup. In Euroleague, he averaged 1.1 and 0.7 rebounds and 1.3 assists in eleven games. In the Adriatic League, he played 9 minutes per game over 20 games, and he averaged 2.4 points and 0.2 rebounds. He also played in the Slovenian League All-Star game in 2007. In the summer of 2012, he signed a new contract with Union Olimpija.

On 19 December 2014, he signed with the Helios Suns of the Slovenian Basketball League for the 2014–15 season.

On 3 January 2015, Močnik had 17 assists against Portorož, breaking the Slovenian League single-game assists record (held by Daniel Vujasinović and Boris Jeršin for 16). In the 2014–15 season he averaged 12.8 points, 7.0 assists and 1.9 rebounds.

On 9 June 2015, Močnik signed a new one-year deal with Helios.

On 4 November 2016, he signed with HKK Široki of the Bosnian League for the 2016–17 season.

Močnik played two seasons (2017–18 and 2018–19) for the Czech top division team BK Olomoucko. He was one of the starting five in his first season, in which he finished with the highest assists per game, 6.9.

On 4 September 2019, he signed a contract with the Slovenian third division team Gorica.

== International career ==
Močnik was a member of the Slovenia under-20 national team. He played at the 2007 FIBA Europe Under-20 Championship, where he scored 9.3 points and made 5 assists in 8 games.
