= KK Grosuplje =

- Leagues: Slovenian Second League
- Founded: 1997; 28 years ago
- Arena: ŠD Brinje
- Capacity: 800
- Location: Grosuplje, Slovenia
- Team colors: White, black, green
- Head coach: Peter Hojč
- Website: www.kk-grosuplje.si
Home	Away

Košarkarski klub Grosuplje or simply KK Grosuplje is a basketball team based in Grosuplje, Slovenia. The team plays in the Slovenian Second League, the second tier of Slovenian basketball.

In 2012–13, 2013–14 and 2014–15, Grosuplje played in the Slovenian top division.
