= Domen Lorbek =

Slovenian basketball player

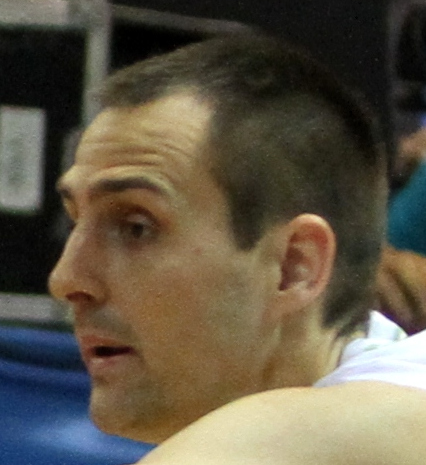
- Lorbek at the EuroBasket 2013

Personal information
- Born: March 6, 1985 (age 41) Kranj, SR Slovenia, SFR Yugoslavia
- Listed height: 6 ft 6.25 in (1.99 m)
- Listed weight: 205 lb (93 kg)

Career information
- NBA draft: 2007: undrafted
- Playing career: 2002–present
- Position: Shooting guard / small forward

Career history
- 2002–2004: Triglav Kranj
- 2004–2006: Helios Domžale
- 2006–2007: Union Olimpija
- 2007–2008: Estudiantes
- 2008–2009: Benetton Treviso
- 2009: Cajasol Sevilla
- 2009–2010: Helios Domžale
- 2010–2011: Lagun Aro
- 2011–2012: Scandone Avellino
- 2012–2013: Krka Novo Mesto
- 2013–2015: Royal Halı Gaziantep
- 2016: Pallacanestro Cantù
- 2016–2017: Real Betis
- 2017–2018: Petrol Olimpija
- 2018: Igokea
- 2018–2019: Petrol Olimpija
- 2021: Helios Suns
- 2022–2023: KK Zlatorog Laško

Career highlights
- 2x Slovenian League champion (2013, 2018)
Medals
Representing Slovenia
FIBA Europe U20 Championship
Gold medal – first place	2004 Czech Republic	U-20 Team
FIBA Europe U18 Championship
Silver medal – second place	2002 Germany	U-18 Team

Domen Lorbek (born March 6, 1985) is a Slovenian professional basketball player who last played for KK Zlatorog Laško of the Slovenian League. He also represented the Slovenian national basketball team internationally. Standing at 1.99 m (6 ft 6.25 in), he primarily plays the shooting guard position, but can also play as small forward. He is a younger brother of Erazem Lorbek and older brother of Klemen Lorbek.

== Professional career ==
Lorbek has played with Ježica, Triglav Kranj, Helios Domžale, Union Olimpija, Estudiantes Madrid, Benetton Treviso and Lagun Aro.

On February 10, 2022, Lorbek signed with KK Zlatorog Laško.

== Slovenian national team ==
Lorbek competed for the senior Slovenian national basketball team at the 2007 FIBA European Championship, Olympic Qualifying Tournament 2008 and 2009 FIBA European Championship.

== Awards and accomplishments ==
=== Krka ===
- Slovenian Supercup Champion: 2012
- Slovenian Supercup MVP: 2012
- Slovenian Champion: 2012–2013

=== Olimpija ===
- Slovenian Champion: 2017–2018
