= Goran Jagodnik =

Slovenian basketball player

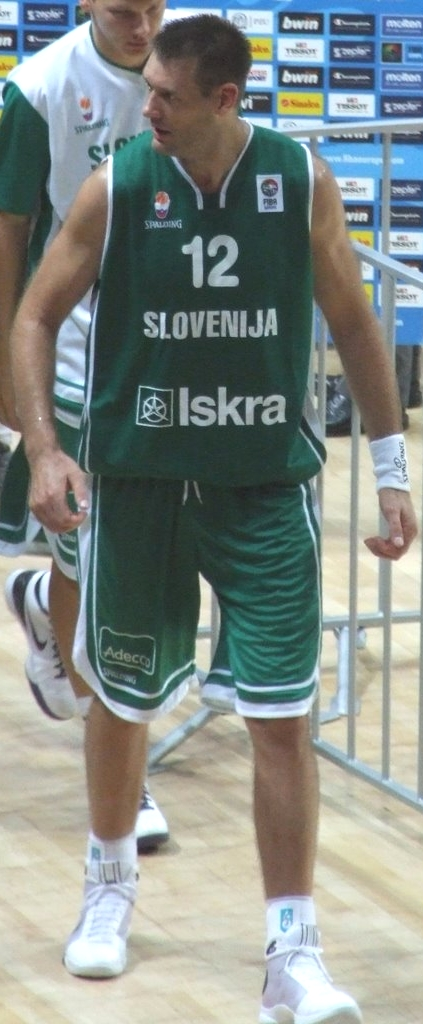
- Jagodnik with Slovenia in 2009

Personal information
- Born: 23 May 1974 (age 52) Postojna, SR Slovenia, SFR Yugoslavia
- Listed height: 2.02 m (6 ft 8 in)
- Listed weight: 103 kg (227 lb)

Career information
- NBA draft: 1996: undrafted
- Playing career: 1991–2017
- Position: Power forward / small forward

Career history
- 1991–1994: Koper
- 1994–1999: Hopsi Polzela
- 1999–2000: Türk Telekom
- 2000–2001: Mydonose Kolejliler
- 2001: Olympique Lausanne
- 2001–2002: Lokomotiv Mineralnye Vody
- 2002–2006: Prokom Trefl Sopot
- 2006: Dynamo Moscow Region
- 2006: Legea Scafati
- 2007: Anwil Włocławek
- 2007–2008: Hemofarm
- 2008–2009: ČEZ Nymburk
- 2009: Hopsi Polzela
- 2009–2010: Hemofarm
- 2010–2012: Union Olimpija
- 2013–2015: Hopsi Polzela
- 2015: Union Olimpija
- 2015–2017: Ilirija

Career highlights
- 3× Polish League champion (2004–2006); Polish Cup winner (2006); 2× Slovenian Cup winner (1996, 2011); Czech League champion (2009); PLK Most Valuable Player (2006); 2× Slovenian League All-Star (1999, 2011); Adriatic League All-Star (2008); 2. SKL MVP (2017)

Goran Jagodnik (born 23 May 1974) is a Slovenian former professional basketball player.

== Professional career ==
During his journeyman career, Jagodnik played for numerous clubs in several countries, most notably with Polish team Prokom Trefl Sopot (four seasons) and Serbian team Hemofarm (two seasons). In his homeland, Jagodnik played with Hopsi Polzela and Union Olimpija.

On 3 March 2015, Union Olimpija announced that he had joined the club for training sessions, with an option of signing a deal until the rest of the season. Two days after that, he was added to the team's Adriatic League roster.

== Slovenian national team ==
Jagodnik was a long-time member of the Slovenian national team, making his debut at EuroBasket 1997. He played at five more European Championships (1999, 2001, 2007, 2009 and 2011), as well as at the 2010 FIBA World Championship.

== Career statistics ==
Legend
GP	Games played	GS	Games started	MPG	Minutes per game
FG%	Field-goal percentage	3P%	3-point field-goal percentage	FT%	Free-throw percentage
RPG	Rebounds per game	APG	Assists per game	SPG	Steals per game
BPG	Blocks per game	PPG	Points per game	PIR	Performance index rating
**Bold**	Career high

=== EuroLeague ===
Year	Team	GP	GS	MPG	FG%	3P%	FT%	RPG	APG	SPG	BPG	PPG	PIR
2004–05	Prokom	**18**	**18**	28.0	.386	.315	.826	6.0	**1.1**	1.5	**.3**	14.8	**12.8**
2005–06	Prokom	14	11	**28.8**	.350	.363	.760	**6.3**	.9	**1.8**	.1	**15.1**	11.6
2010–11	Union Olimpija	16	0	20.5	**.445**	**.390**	**.905**	3.0	.8	.6	—	10.4	8.2
Career		48	29	25.7	.386	.349	.826	5.1	.9	1.3	.2	13.4	10.9
