= KK Ilirija =

Basketball club in Ljubljana, Slovenia

Ilirija
- Leagues: 1. SKL; ABA League
- Founded: 1957; 69 years ago
- Arena: Tivoli Hall
- Capacity: 4,500
- Location: Ljubljana, Slovenia
- Team colors: White, black
- Main sponsor: Perspektiva FT, d.o.o.
- President: Marin Ribać
- Vice-president: Mirza Bešić
- General manager: Saša Dončić
- Head coach: Gašper Okorn
- Team captain: Edo Murić
- Website: www.kkilirija.com
Home	Away

Košarkarski klub Ilirija (English: Ilirija Basketball Club) or simply Ilirija is a basketball team based in Ljubljana, Slovenia. The team competes in the 1. SKL, the top-tier league in Slovenia, and in the regional ABA League.

== Current roster ==
Note: Flags indicate national team eligibility at FIBA-sanctioned events. Players may hold other non-FIBA nationalities not displayed.

Ilirija roster
Players
Coaches

Pos.	No.	Nat.	Name	Ht.	Age
G	1	(United States)	Green Jr., Wendell	1.78 m (5 ft 10 in)	24 – 7 August 2002
SG	3	(Slovenia)	Gabrijel, Bine	1.86 m (6 ft 1 in)	19 – 18 May 2007
SG	4	(Slovenia)	Padjen, Mark	1.96 m (6 ft 5 in)	20 – 25 January 2006
SG	6	(Slovenia)	Škorjanc, Gašper	1.90 m (6 ft 3 in)	22 – 19 February 2004
F	8	(Slovenia)	Murić, Edo (C)	2.02 m (6 ft 8 in)	34 – 27 November 1991
SF	9	(Slovenia)	Tomažič, Tim	1.99 m (6 ft 6 in)	27 – 19 September 1999
PF	11	(Slovenia)	Faganel, Lovro	1.98 m (6 ft 6 in)	19 – 5 September 2007
C	12	(Canada)	Shittu, Simisola	2.08 m (6 ft 10 in)	27 – 7 November 1999
F	13	(Slovenia)	Jurković, Robert	2.08 m (6 ft 10 in)	24 – 14 June 2002
G	14	(Bulgaria)	Raykov, Radoslav	1.98 m (6 ft 6 in)	20 – 18 April 2006
F	23	(Slovenia)	Vukotić, Tristan	2.00 m (6 ft 7 in)	21 – 17 May 2005
SG	35	(Slovenia)	Kureš, Luka	1.92 m (6 ft 4 in)	28 – 28 September 1998
C	51	(Serbia)	Marjanović, Boban	2.24 m (7 ft 4 in)	38 – 15 August 1988
SG	55	(Slovenia)	Boisa, Lian	1.93 m (6 ft 4 in)	19 – 14 August 2007

Head coach

- (Slovenia) Stipe Modrić

Assistant coach(es)

- (Slovenia) Jurij Ucman
- (Slovenia) Luka Bassin

Strength & conditioning coach(es)

- (Slovenia) Klemen Zaletel

Physiotherapist(s)

- (Slovenia) Zoja Ivančič
- (Slovenia) Anže Zakotnik

Team manager

- (Slovenia) Matej Kadak

Legend

- (C) Team captain
- Injured

- Roster
Updated: December 26, 2025

== Honours ==
- Slovenian Republic League

Winners: 1961, 1969, 1971, 1972, 1975, 1982

- Slovenian Second League

Winners: 2016–17, 2020–21

- Slovenian Third Division

Winners: 2015–16

- Slovenian Fourth Division

Winners: 2014–15

== Head coaches ==
The following is a list of head coaches since 2001:

- Vladimir Mićunović, 2001–2002
- Spasoje Todorović, 2002–2005
- Jošo Gagel, 2005–2007
- Dejan Prokić, 2007–2008
- Andrej Božič, 2008–2010
- Drago Dedovič, 2010–2011
- Jure Saje, 2011–2012
- Dejan Prokić, 2012–2013
- Gregor Hafnar, 2013–2014
- Mitja Smole, 2014–2015
- Saša Dončić, 2015–2019
- Luka Bassin, 2019–2020
- Saša Dončić, 2020–2022
- Stipe Modrić, 2022–2026
- Gašper Okorn, 2026–present
