= KK Parklji =

Parklji
- Founded: 1993; 32 years ago
- Folded: 2019; 6 years ago
- Arena: Dvorana OŠ Maksa Pečarja
- Location: Ljubljana, Slovenia
- Team colors: Red, black

Košarkarski klub Parklji (English: Parklji Basketball Club), commonly referred to as KK Parklji or simply Parklji, was a basketball team based in Ljubljana, Slovenia. The club was founded in 1993 and folded in late 2019.
