= KK Maribor =

Maribor
- Nickname: Vijoličasti (The Purples)
- Leagues: Telemach League (2010–2015)
- Founded: 2005; 20 years ago
- Dissolved: 2015; 10 years ago
- Arena: Tabor Hall
- Capacity: 3,261
- Location: Maribor, Slovenia
- Team colors: Purple, white
Home	Away

Košarkarski klub Maribor (English: Maribor Basketball Club), commonly referred to as KK Maribor or simply Maribor, was a professional basketball team based in Maribor, Slovenia. It has been a Premier A Slovenian Basketball League member from 2010 to 2015.

== History ==
The club was founded in 2005 on the base of ŽKK Maribor youth school and KŠ Maribor.

Due to financial problems, the club's board announced bankruptcy on 10 April 2015. The club withdrew from all competitions, including youth selections.

== Season-by-season records ==
Season	Tier	League	Pos.	Postseason	Cup
2006–07	4	3. SKL	2	Promoted	—
2007–08	3	2. SKL	3	Promotion playoffs	—
2008–09	3	2. SKL	1	Promoted	Fifth round
2009–10	2	1. B SKL	1	Promoted	Fourth round
2010–11	1	Telemach League	7	—	Sixth round
2011–12	1	Telemach League	8	—	Quarter-finals
2012–13	1	Telemach League	3	Semifinalist	Quarter-finals
2013–14	1	Telemach League	9	—	Fifth round
2014–15	1	Telemach League	12	Withdrew	Fifth round

== Honours ==
- Slovenian Second Division

2009–10

- Slovenian Third Division

2008–09
