= 2011–12 A-1 League =

- League: A-1 League
- Sport: Basketball
- Duration: October 8, 2011 – March 10, 2012 (Regular season)
- TV partner(s): Sport Klub

Regular season
- Season champions: Zadar
- Season MVP: (United States) Ronald Ross (Jolly JBŠ)
- Top scorer: (Croatia) Ivan Mimica (Split) (21.00 ppg)

Champions Round
- Season champions: Cibona
- Season MVP: (Croatia) Miro Bilan (Cedevita)
- Top scorer: (Croatia) Andrej Štimac (Svjetlost Brod) (18.00 ppg)

Playoff stage

Finals
- Champions: Cibona
- Runners-up: Cedevita

A-1 League seasons
- ← 2010–11 2012–13 →

The 2011–12 A-1 League (Croatian: A-1 liga 2011./12.) was the 21st season of the A-1 League, the highest professional basketball league in Croatia. The first half of the season consisted of 11 teams and 110-game regular season (20 games for each of the 11 teams) began on Friday, October 8, 2011 and ended on Wednesday, March 14, 2012. The second half of the season consisted of 3 teams from ABA League and the best 5 teams from first half of the season. Playoffs started on May 15, 2012 and ended on June 5.

Cibona won its 17th title.

== Team information ==
=== Venues and locations ===
	Teams	Team	City	Venue (Capacity)
Regular season teams	11			
Regular season teams	11	Alkar	Sinj	Športska dvorana Sinj (1,500)
Regular season teams	11	Dubrovnik	Dubrovnik	Športska dvorana Gospino polje (2,500)
Regular season teams	11	Jolly Jadranska banka Šibenik	Šibenik	Sportska dvorana Baldekin (1,500)
Regular season teams	11	Križevci	Križevci	ŠŠD OŠ Ljudevita Modeca (1,600)
Regular season teams	11	Kvarner 2010	Rijeka	Dvorana Dinko Lukarić (1,100)
Regular season teams	11	Sonik Puntamika	Zadar	Jazine Basketball Hall (3,000)
Regular season teams	11	Split	Split	Arena Gripe (6,000)
Regular season teams	11	Svjetlost Brod	Slavonski Brod	Sportska dvorana Vijuš (2,200)
Regular season teams	11	Vrijednosnice OS Darda	Darda	Sportska dvorana Darda (600)
Regular season teams	11	Zabok	Zabok	Športska dvorana Bedekovčina (2,500)
Regular season teams	11	Zadar	Zadar	Krešimir Ćosić Hall (8,500)
Teams already qualified for Champions League	3			
Teams already qualified for Champions League	3	Cedevita	Zagreb	Dom Sportova (3,100)
Teams already qualified for Champions League	3	Cibona	Zagreb	Dražen Petrović Basketball Hall (5,400)
Teams already qualified for Champions League	3	Zagreb	Zagreb	Športska dvorana Trnsko (2,500)

Location of teams in the A-1 League 2011–12

== Regular season ==
Clinched Champions league berth

#	Team	Pts	Pld	W	L	PF	PA
1	Zadar	36	20	16	4	1661	1354
2	Jolly JBŠ	35	20	15	5	1592	1495
3	Split	34	20	14	6	1586	1510
4	Zabok	31	20	11	9	1550	1510
5	Svjetlost Brod	30	20	10	10	1418	1469
6	Alkar	29	20	9	11	1489	1525
7	Vrijednosnice OS Darda	28	20	8	12	1552	1526
8	Sonik Puntamika	28	20	8	12	1434	1466
9	Kvarner 2010	28	20	8	12	1540	1603
10	Križevci	28	20	8	12	1566	1639
11	Dubrovnik	23	20	3	17	1442	1733

== Champions Round ==
Clinched Playoffs berth

#	Team	Pts	Pld	W	L	PF	PA	Diff
1	Cibona	28	14	14	0	1263	996	+267
2	Cedevita	25	14	11	3	1218	1022	+196
3	Split	24	14	10	4	1149	1120	+29
4	Zadar	22	14	8	6	1031	985	+46
5	Zagreb CO	20	14	6	8	1212	1156	+56
6	Svjetlost Brod	17	14	3	11	964	1149	-185
7	Jolly JBŠ	16	14	2	12	1022	1209	-187
8	Zabok	16	14	2	12	1056	1278	-222

== Relegation and Promotion Rounds ==
=== Relegation Round ===
Relegation/Promotion Play off
Relegated

#	Team	Pts	Pld	W	L	PF	PA	Diff
1	Križevci	32	20	12	8	1575	1549	+26
2	Kvarner 2010	31	20	11	9	1582	1555	+27
3	Alkar	31	20	11	9	1591	1588	+3
4	VROS Darda	30	20	10	10	1541	1540	+1
5	Dubrovnik	28	20	8	12	1555	1608	-53
6	Sonik Puntamika	28	20	8	12	1452	1456	-4

=== Promotion Round ===
Promotion League comprises five regional second division winners.

Promoted
Relegation/Promotion Play off

#	Team	Pts	Pld	W	L
1	Osječki sokol	15	8	7	1
2	Crikvenica	14	8	6	2
3	Dubrava	13	8	5	3
4	Međimurje	11	8	3	5
5	Poličnik	8	8	0	8

=== Relegation/Promotion play-offs ===
Relegation league 5th-placed team Dubrovnik faces the 2nd-placed Promotion league side Crikvenica in a two-legged play-off. The winner on aggregate score after both matches will earn a spot in the 2012–13 A-1 League.

==== Dubrovnik vs. Crikvenica ====
May 19
20:00

Report

Crikvenica	61–76	Dubrovnik
Scoring by quarter: 10:27, 23:15, 12:21, 16:13
Pts: Kozlevčar 16		Pts: Petković 22

Gradska sportska dvorana Crikvenica, Crikvenica
Attendance: 350
Referees: Jovović, Perlić, Peić

May 22
20:00

Report

Dubrovnik	98–68	Crikvenica
Scoring by quarter: 25:21, 31:17, 22:13, 20:17
Pts: Došen 27		Pts: Belina 18

Športska dvorana Gospino polje, Dubrovnik
Attendance: 150
Referees: Radojković, Tomić, Stojić

Dubrovnik retained its A-1 League status.

== Playoffs ==
=== Bracket ===
Semifinals
1	Cibona	2
4	Zadar	0
2	Cedevita	2
3	Split	1

Finals
1	Cibona	3
2	Cedevita	1

=== Semifinals ===
The semifinals are best-of-3 series.

==== Cibona vs. Zadar ====
May 15
20:00 CEST

Report

Cibona	86–57	Zadar
Scoring by quarter: 20–10, 19-7, 30–19, 17–21
Pts: Rudež 18		Pts: Vrbanc, Krapić 13
1–0

Dražen Petrović Basketball Hall, Zagreb
Attendance: 3,500
Referees: Radović, Herceg, Radojković

May 18
20:00 CEST

Report

Zadar	62–85	Cibona
Scoring by quarter: 14:9, 18:26, 11:28, 19:22
Pts: Vrbanc, Delaš 13		Pts: Rudež 15
2-0

Krešimir Ćosić Hall, Zadar
Referees: Muhvić, Dožai, Vovk

==== Cedevita vs. Split ====
May 17
20:00 CEST

Report

Cedevita	87–84	Split
Scoring by quarter: 25-23, 14-23, 18-19, 30-19
Pts: Bilan 19		Pts: Vujčić 19
1-0

Dom sportova, Zagreb
Attendance: 2,000
Referees: Muhvić, Hordov, Anzulović

May 19
18:00 CEST

Report

Split	82–79	Cedevita
Scoring by quarter: 27:19, 19:13, 11:22, 25:25
Pts: Mimica 26		Pts: Draper 19
1-1

Arena Gripe, Split
Attendance: 2,500
Referees: Dožai, Vovk, Hordov

May 23
20:00 CEST

Report

Cedevita	96–70	Split
Scoring by quarter: 17:17, 29:13, 20:22, 30:18
Pts: Bilan 17		Pts: Subotić 16
2-1

Dom sportova, Zagreb
Attendance: 3,300
Referees: Muhvić, Radović, Herceg

=== Finals ===
The finals are best-of-5 series.

==== Cibona vs. Cedevita ====
May 26
20:00 CEST

Report

Cibona	84–77	Cedevita
Scoring by quarter: 23:17, 16:18, 22:23, 23:19
Pts: Kus 18		Pts: Bilan 20
1-0

Dražen Petrović Basketball Hall, Zagreb
Attendance: 5,000
Referees: Muhvić, Radović, Vovk

May 29
20:00 CEST

Report

Cedevita	64–82	Cibona
Scoring by quarter: 18:25, 11:19, 15:14, 20:24
Pts: Vukušić, Baždarić 11		Pts: Wright 14
2-0

Dom sportova, Zagreb
Attendance: 3,500
Referees: Dožai, Herceg, Hodrov

June 2
20:15 CEST

Report

Cibona	70–79 (OT)	Cedevita
Scoring by quarter: 22:14, 14:22, 10:17, 20:13, Overtime: 4:13
Pts: Rudež 15		Pts: Baždarić 18
2-1

Dražen Petrović Basketball Hall, Zagreb
Attendance: 5,500
Referees: Radović, Dožai, Herceg

June 5
20:00 CEST

Report

Cedevita	64–77	Cibona
Scoring by quarter: 18:20, 12:18, 20:25, 14:14
Pts: Owens 14		Pts: Kus 18
KK Cibona Zagreb wins series 3-1

Dom sportova, Zagreb
Attendance: 4,000
Referees: Muhvić, Radović, Dožai

A-1 League Finals MVP:

2012 A-1 League
Cibona Zagreb
17th title
