= 2012–13 A-1 League =

- League: A-1 League
- Sport: Basketball
- Duration: October 6, 2012 – March 17, 2013 (Regular season); March 26, 2013 – May 14, 2013 (Champions/Relegation Round)
- Number of teams: 14
- TV partner(s): SportKlub

Regular season
- Season champions: Zagreb
- Season MVP: (United States) Ronald Ross (Jolly JBŠ)
- Top scorer: (United States) Ronald Ross (Jolly JBŠ) (22.12 ppg)

Championship Round
- Season champions: Cibona

Playoff stage

Finals
- Champions: Cibona
- Runners-up: Zadar

A-1 League seasons
- ← 2011–12 2013–14 →

The 2012–13 A-1 League (Croatian: A-1 liga 2012./13.) was the 22nd season of the A-1 League, the highest professional basketball league in Croatia. The first half of the season consists of 10 teams and 100-game regular season (10 games for each of the 10 teams) begins on Saturday, October 6, 2012 and ended on Sunday, March 17, 2012. For second half of the season clubs will be divided into two groups. Championship group will consists of 4 teams from ABA League and the best 4 teams from first half of the season. Relegation group will consist of bottom 6 teams from first half of the season.

== Teams and venues ==
- Relegated to A-2 Liga
  - ~~Sonik Puntamika~~ (14th)
- Promoted from A-2 Liga
  - Osječki sokol (Champion)

	Teams	Team	City	Venue (Capacity)
Regular season teams	10
Regular season teams	10	Alkar	Sinj	Športska dvorana Sinj (1,500)
Regular season teams	10	Dubrovnik	Dubrovnik	Športska dvorana Gospino polje (2,500)
Regular season teams	10	Đuro Đaković	Slavonski Brod	Sportska dvorana Vijuš (2,200)
Regular season teams	10	Jolly Jadranska banka Šibenik	Šibenik	Sportska dvorana Baldekin (1,500)
Regular season teams	10	Križevci	Križevci	ŠŠD OŠ Ljudevita Modeca (1,600)
Regular season teams	10	Kvarner 2010	Rijeka	Dvorana Dinko Lukarić (1,100)
Regular season teams	10	Osječki sokol	Osijek	Sportska dvorana Jug 2 (1,250)
Regular season teams	10	Vrijednosnice OS Darda	Darda	Sportska dvorana Darda (600)
Regular season teams	10	Zabok	Zabok	Športska dvorana Bedekovčina (2,500)
Regular season teams	10	Zagreb	Zagreb	Športska dvorana Trnsko (2,500)
Teams already qualified for Championship Round	4
Teams already qualified for Championship Round	4	Cedevita	Zagreb	Dom Sportova (3,100)
Teams already qualified for Championship Round	4	Cibona	Zagreb	Dražen Petrović Basketball Hall (5,400)
Teams already qualified for Championship Round	4	Split	Split	Arena Gripe (6,000)
Teams already qualified for Championship Round	4	Zadar	Zadar	Krešimir Ćosić Hall (8,500)

Location of teams in the A-1 League 2012–13

== Regular season ==
Clinched Champions league berth

#	Team	Pts	Pld	W	L	PF	PA
1	Zagreb	32	18	14	4	1480	1350
2	Kvarner 2010	31	18	13	5	1379	1218
3	Alkar	30	18	12	6	1405	1334
4	Jolly JBŠ	30	18	12	6	1525	1413
5	Vrijednosnice OS Darda	28	18	10	8	1326	1288
6	Đuro Đaković	28	18	10	8	1366	1358
7	Zabok	25	18	7	11	1371	1337
8	Križevci	24	18	6	12	1304	1440
9	Osječki sokol	23	18	5	13	1371	1505
10	Dubrovnik	19	18	1	17	1248	1532

== Championship Round ==
Clinched Playoffs berth

#	Team	Pts	Pld	W	L	PF	PA	Diff
1	Cibona	26	14	12	2	1186	1060	+126
2	Zadar	25	14	11	3	1175	1072	+103
3	Cedevita	25	14	11	3	1239	997	+242
4	Jolly JBŠ	21	14	7	7	1003	1032	-29
5	Kvarner 2010	21	14	7	7	988	1073	-85
6	Split	19	14	5	9	999	1055	-56
7	Zagreb	16	14	2	12	1102	1195	-93
8	Alkar	15	14	1	13	1015	1223	-208

== Relegation and Promotion Rounds ==
=== Relegation Round ===
Relegation/Promotion Play off
Relegated

#	Team	Pts	Pld	W	L	PF	PA	Diff
1	Đuro Đaković	34	20	14	6	1533	1421	+112
2	VROS Darda	33	20	13	7	1510	1414	+96
3	Zabok	31	20	11	9	1625	1504	+121
4	Osječki sokol	30	20	10	10	1559	1593	-34
5	Križevci (R/P PO)	29	20	9	11	1532	1586	-54
6	Dubrovnik (R)	23	20	3	17	1453	1694	-241

=== Promotion Round ===
Promotion
Relegation/Promotion Play off

#	Team	Pts	Pld	W	L	PF	PA	Diff
1	Šibenik (P)	16	8	8	0	763	606	+157
2	Škrljevo (R/P PO)	13	8	5	3	708	664	+44
3	Belišće	11	8	3	5	593	623	-30
4	Hermes Analitica	11	8	3	5	636	670	-34
5	Čakovec	9	8	1	7	560	709	-149

=== Relegation/Promotion play-off ===
Relegation league 5th-placed team Križevci faces the 2nd-placed Promotion league side Škrljevo in a two-legged play-off. The winner on aggregate score after both matches will earn a spot in the 2013–14 A-1 League.

==== Škrljevo vs. Križevci ====
May 18
20:00

Report

Škrljevo	86–90	Križevci
Scoring by quarter: 27:14, 23:30, 19:30, 17:16
Pts: Salamun 15		Pts: Svoboda 22

Dvorana Mavrinci, Čavle
Attendance: 600
Referees: Perlić, Prpić, Kardum

May 23
20:00

Report

Križevci	91–85	Škrljevo
Scoring by quarter: 21:23, 18:12, 21:21, 31:29
Pts: Svoboda 24		Pts: Salamun 20

Dvorana OŠ Ljudevita Modeca, Križevci
Attendance: 700
Referees: Radojković, Vulić, Stojić

Križevci retained its A-1 League status.

== Playoffs ==
=== Bracket ===
Semifinals
1	Cibona	2
4	Jolly JBŠ	0
2	Zadar	2
3	Cedevita	1

Finals
1	Cibona	3
2	Zadar	0

=== Semifinals ===
The semifinals are best-of-3 series.

==== Cibona vs. Jolly JBŠ ====
May 18
18:30 CEST

Report

Cibona	99–74	Jolly JBŠ
Scoring by quarter: 29:21, 25:20, 24:24, 21:9
Pts: Žižić 21		Pts: Katura 19
1–0

Dražen Petrović Basketball Hall, Zagreb
Attendance: 1,500
Referees: Radović, Vovk, Hordov

May 21
20:15 CEST

Report

Jolly JBŠ	67–73	Cibona
Scoring by quarter: 16:24, 18:18, 20:18, 13:13
Pts: Ross 16		Pts: Strawberry 14
2–0

Sportska dvorana Baldekin, Šibenik
Attendance: 800
Referees: Muhvić, Hordov, Jovović

==== Zadar vs. Cedevita ====
May 19
19:00 CEST

Report

Zadar	79–74	Cedevita
Scoring by quarter: 16:21, 17:14, 27:14, 19:25
Pts: Delaš 20		Pts: Tomas 19
1–0

Krešimir Ćosić Hall, Zadar
Attendance: 6,000
Referees: Muhvić, Anzulović, Radojković

May 22
20:15 CEST

Report

Cedevita	91–61	Zadar
Scoring by quarter: 16:13, 26:11, 25:14, 24:23
Pts: Tomas 20		Pts: Krasić, Nurkić 10
1–1

Dom Sportova, Zagreb
Attendance: 2,200
Referees: Radović, Dožai, Herceg

May 26
20:30 CEST

Report

Zadar	86–81	Cedevita
Scoring by quarter: 19:20, 20:25, 22:16, 25:20
Pts: Vrbanc 14		Pts: Andrić 16
2–1

Krešimir Ćosić Hall, Zadar
Attendance: 7,000
Referees: Muhvić, Anzulović, Vovk

=== Finals ===
The finals are best-of-5 series.

==== Cibona vs. Zadar ====
May 29
20:00 CEST

Report

Cibona	84–68	Zadar
Scoring by quarter: 28:15, 19:22, 18:14, 19:17
Pts: Blassingame, Žižić 20		Pts: Travis 21
1–0

Dražen Petrović Basketball Hall, Zagreb
Attendance: 5,000
Referees: Muhvić, Radović, Vovk

June 1
20:00 CEST

Report

Zadar	76–92	Cibona
Scoring by quarter: 30:19, 18:26, 17:30, 11:17
Pts: Delaš 16		Pts: Blassingame 21
2–0

Krešimir Ćosić Hall, Zadar
Attendance: 10,000
Referees: Dožai, Herceg, Radojković

June 4
20:00 CEST

Report

Cibona	101–83	Zadar
Scoring by quarter: 35:22, 14:20, 23:22, 29:19
Pts: Blassingame 20		Pts: Delaš 17
Cibona wins series 3–0

Dražen Petrović Basketball Hall, Zagreb
Attendance: 5,000
Referees: Muhvić, Radović, Anzulović

2013 A-1 League
Cibona Zagreb
18th title
