= 2009–10 A-1 League =

- League: A-1 League
- Sport: Basketball
- Duration: October 17, 2009 – March 14, 2010 (regular season)

Regular Season
- Season champions: Zabok
- Season MVP: (Croatia) Toni Bizaca (Trogir)
- Top scorer: (Croatia) Toni Bizaca (Trogir) (24.89 ppg)

Champions Round
- Season champions: Cibona

Playoff stage

Finals
- Champions: Cibona
- Runners-up: Zadar

A-1 League seasons
- ← 2008–09 2010–11 →

The 2009–10 A-1 League (Croatian: A-1 liga 2009./10.) was the 19th season of the A-1 League, the highest professional basketball league in Croatia. The first half of the season consisted of 10 teams and 90-game regular season (9 games for each of the 10 teams) began on Saturday, October 17, 2009 and ended on Sunday, March 14, 2010. The second half of the season consists of 4 teams from ABA League and the best 4 teams from first half of the season.

== Team information ==
=== Venues and locations ===
	Teams	Team	City	Venue (Capacity)
Regular season teams	10			
Regular season teams	10	Borik Puntamika	Zadar	Jazine Basketball Hall (3,000)
Regular season teams	10	Dubrava	Zagreb	Športska dvorana Dubrava (1,800)
Regular season teams	10	Dubrovnik	Dubrovnik	Športska dvorana Gospino polje (2,500)
Regular season teams	10	Kaštel Galerija	Kaštel Stari	
Regular season teams	10	Split	Split	Arena Gripe (6,000)
Regular season teams	10	Svjetlost Brod	Slavonski Brod	Sportska dvorana Vijuš (2,200)
Regular season teams	10	Šibenik	Šibenik	Sportska dvorana Baldekin (900)
Regular season teams	10	Trogir	Trogir	Sportska dvorana Vinko Kandija (1,000)
Regular season teams	10	Vrijednosnice OS Darda	Darda	Sportska dvorana Darda (600)
Regular season teams	10	Zabok	Zabok	Športska dvorana Bedekovčina (2,500)
Teams already qualified for Champions League	4			
Teams already qualified for Champions League	4	Cedevita	Zagreb	Sportska dvorana Sutinska vrela (2,000)
Teams already qualified for Champions League	4	Cibona	Zagreb	Dražen Petrović Basketball Hall (5,400)
Teams already qualified for Champions League	4	Zadar	Zadar	Krešimir Ćosić Hall (8,500)
Teams already qualified for Champions League	4	Zagreb	Zagreb	Športska dvorana Trnsko (2,500)

== Regular season ==
Clinched Champions round berth

#	Team	Pts	Pld	W	L	PF	PA
1	Zabok	30	18	12	6	1489	1392
2	Svjetlost Brod	30	18	12	6	1515	1460
3	Trogir	30	18	12	6	1524	1484
4	Vrijednosnice OS Darda	29	18	11	7	1444	1446
5	Borik Puntamika	28	18	10	8	1347	1301
6	Split	27	18	9	9	1420	1335
7	Dubrava	26	18	8	10	1389	1433
8	Dubrovnik	25	18	7	11	1466	1518
9	Šibenik	23	18	5	13	1443	1578
10	Kaštel Galerija	22	18	4	14	1318	1408

== Champions Round ==
Clinched Playoffs berth

#	Team	Pts	Pld	W	L	PF	PA	Diff
1	Cibona	26	14	12	2	1276	1012	+264
2	Zadar	26	14	12	2	1259	1067	+192
3	Cedevita	25	14	11	3	1279	1074	+205
4	Zagreb CO	23	14	9	5	1207	1132	+75
5	Zabok	19	14	5	9	1124	1236	-112
6	Svjetlost Brod	18	14	4	10	1170	1369	-199
7	Trogir	16	14	2	12	1104	1302	-198
8	Vrijednosnice OS Darda	15	14	1	13	984	1211	-227

== Relegation and Promotion Rounds ==
=== Relegation round ===
Promotion Round
Relegated

#	Team	Pts	Pld	W	L	PF	PA	Diff
1	Borik Puntamika	35	10	7	3	1547	1408	+139
2	Split CO	32	10	6	4	1582	1465	+117
3	Dubrava	31	10	6	4	1612	1603	+9
4	Dubrovnik	30	10	5	5	1657	1703	-46
5	Šibenik	27	10	3	7	1621	1736	-115
6	Kaštel Galerija	26	10	3	7	1498	1602	-104

=== Promotion Round ===
Promotion League comprises five regional second division winners.

Promoted

#	Team	Pts	Pld	W	L	PF	PA	Diff
1	Kvarner 2010	19	10	9	1	887	708	+179
2	Alkar	18	10	8	2	790	694	+96
3	Šibenik	16	10	6	4	779	769	+10
4	Mladost	14	10	4	6	733	794	-61
5	Međimurje	12	10	2	8	763	824	-61
5	Belišće	11	10	1	9	695	858	-163

== Playoffs ==
Teams in italics had home advantage. Teams in bold won the playoff series. Numbers to the left of each team indicate the team's original playoff seeding. Numbers to the right indicate the score of each playoff game.

Semifinals
**1**	**Cibona**	**93**	**78**	–
4	Zagreb CO	75	65	–
**2**	**Zadar**	**83**	76	**81**
3	Cedevita	63	**83**	79

Finals
**1**	**Cibona**	76	72	**87**	**78**	**95**
2	Zadar	**80**	**77**	81	71	73
