= 2010–11 A-1 League =

- League: A-1 League
- Sport: Basketball
- Duration: October 9, 2011 – March 12, 2011 (Regular season)

Regular season
- Season champions: Split
- Season MVP: (Croatia) Toni Bizaca (Trogir)
- Top scorer: (Croatia) Toni Bizaca (Trogir) (25.30 ppg)

Champions League
- Season champions: Cedevita

Playoff stage

Finals
- Champions: Zagreb
- Runners-up: Cedevita

A-1 League seasons
- ← 2009–10 2011–12 →

The 2010–11 A-1 League (Croatian: A-1 liga 2010./11.) was the 20th season of the A-1 League, the highest professional basketball league in Croatia. The first half of the season consisted of 10 teams and 90-game regular season (9 games for each of the 10 teams) began on Saturday, October 9, 2010 and ended on Saturday, March 12, 2011. The second half of the season consists of 4 teams from ABA League and the best 4 teams from first half of the season.

== Team information ==
=== Venues and locations ===
	Teams	Team	City	Venue (Capacity)
Regular season teams	10			
Regular season teams	10	Alkar	Sinj	Športska dvorana Sinj (1,500)
Regular season teams	10	Borik Puntamika	Zadar	Jazine Basketball Hall (3,000)
Regular season teams	10	Dubrava	Zagreb	Športska dvorana Dubrava (1,800)
Regular season teams	10	Dubrovnik	Dubrovnik	Športska dvorana Gospino polje (2,500)
Regular season teams	10	Kvarner 2010	Rijeka	Dvorana Dinko Lukarić (1,100)
Regular season teams	10	Split	Split	Arena Gripe (6,000)
Regular season teams	10	Svjetlost Brod	Slavonski Brod	Sportska dvorana Vijuš (2,200)
Regular season teams	10	Trogir	Trogir	Sportska dvorana Vinko Kandija (1,000)
Regular season teams	10	Vrijednosnice OS Darda	Darda	Sportska dvorana Darda (600)
Regular season teams	10	Zabok	Zabok	Športska dvorana Bedekovčina (2,500)
Teams already qualified for Champions League	4			
Teams already qualified for Champions League	4	Cedevita	Zagreb	Sportska dvorana Sutinska vrela (2,000)
Teams already qualified for Champions League	4	Cibona	Zagreb	Dražen Petrović Basketball Hall (5,400)
Teams already qualified for Champions League	4	Zadar	Zadar	Krešimir Ćosić Hall (8,500)
Teams already qualified for Champions League	4	Zagreb	Zagreb	Športska dvorana Trnsko (2,500)

== Regular season ==
Clinched Champions league berth

#	Team	Pts	Pld	W	L	PF	PA
1	KK Split	33	18	15	3	1569	1334
2	KK Borik Puntamika	29	18	11	7	1396	1288
3	KK Alkar	29	18	11	7	1382	1341
4	KK Zabok	28	18	10	8	1416	1383
5	KK Dubrovnik	28	18	10	8	1402	1423
6	KK Kvarner 2010	27	18	9	11	1381	1416
7	KK Vrijednosnice OS Darda	26	18	8	10	1380	1432
8	KK Svjetlost Brod	25	18	7	11	1406	1445
9	KK Dubrava	23	18	5	13	1437	1555
10	KK Trogir	22	18	4	14	1308	1460

== Champions League ==
Clinched Playoffs berth

#	Team	Pts	Pld	W	L	PF	PA	Diff
1	Cedevita	26	14	12	2	1163	1010	+153
2	Zadar	25	14	11	3	1109	943	+166
3	Zagreb CO	25	14	11	3	1224	1043	+181
4	Cibona	21	14	7	7	1153	1115	+38
5	Borik Puntamika	19	14	5	9	976	1073	-97
6	Split	19	14	5	9	991	1095	-104
7	Alkar	18	14	4	10	976	1067	-91
8	Zabok	15	14	1	13	956	1202	-246

== Relegation League ==
Relegation/Promotion Play off
Relegated

#	Team	Pts	Pld	W	L	PF	PA	Diff
1	Dubrava	16	10	6	4			
2	Svjetlost Brod	16	10	6	4			
3	Vros Darda	16	10	6	4			
4	Kvarner 2010	14	10	4	6			
5	Dubrovnik	14	10	4	6			
6	Trogir	14	10	4	6			

== Playoffs ==
=== Bracket ===
Semifinals
1	Cedevita	2
4	Cibona	1
2	Zadar	0
3	Zagreb CO	2

Finals
1	Cedevita	0
3	Zagreb CO	3
