= 2013–14 A-1 League =

A-1 League
- Season: 2013–14
- Duration: October 11, 2013 – June 10, 2014
- Games played: 31
- Teams: 10 +3
- TV partner(s): SportKlub

Regular season
- Top seed: Cedevita
- Promoted: Ribola Kaštela; Gorica
- Relegated: Križevci (withdrew)

Finals
- Champions: Cedevita; 1st title
- Runners-up: Cibona
- Semifinalists: Zadar; Jolly JBŠ

Statistical leaders
| Points | (Croatia) Dario Šarić (Cibona) | 19.3 |
| Rebounds | (Croatia) Dario Šarić (Cibona) | 9.6 |
| Assists | (United States) Jerel Blassingame (Cibona) | 6.2 |
- All statistics correct as of 13 September 2014.

The 2013–14 A-1 League (Croatian: A-1 liga 2013./14.) was the 23rd season of the A-1 League, the highest professional basketball league in Croatia.

The first half of the season consisted of 10 teams and 90-game regular season. For second half of the season clubs was divided into two groups. Championship group consisted of 3 teams from ABA League and the best 5 teams from first half of the season. Relegation group consisted of bottom 5 teams from first half of the season.

For the first time in the history of the club, Cedevita were crowned the Croatian league title champions against Cibona with a 3–0 win in the final series.

== Teams and venues ==
- Relegated to A-2 Liga
  - ~~Dubrovnik~~ (14th)
- Withdrew
  - ~~Osječki sokol~~ (12th)
- Promoted from A-2 Liga
  - Šibenik (Champion)

| | Teams | Team | City | Venue (Capacity) |
|---|---|---|---|---|
| Regular season teams | 10 |
| Regular season teams | 10 | Alkar | Sinj | Športska dvorana Sinj (1,500) |
| Regular season teams | 10 | Slavonski Brod | Slavonski Brod | Sportska dvorana Vijuš (2,200) |
| Regular season teams | 10 | Jolly Jadranska banka Šibenik | Šibenik | Sportska dvorana Baldekin (1,500) |
| Regular season teams | 10 | Križevci | Križevci | ŠŠD OŠ Ljudevita Modeca (1,600) |
| Regular season teams | 10 | Kvarner 2010 | Rijeka | Dvorana Dinko Lukarić (1,100) |
| Regular season teams | 10 | Split | Split | Arena Gripe (6,000) |
| Regular season teams | 10 | Šibenik | Šibenik | Sportska dvorana Baldekin (1,500) |
| Regular season teams | 10 | Vrijednosnice OS Darda | Darda | Sportska dvorana Darda (600) |
| Regular season teams | 10 | Zabok | Zabok | Športska dvorana Bedekovčina (2,500) |
| Regular season teams | 10 | Zagreb | Zagreb | Športska dvorana Trnsko (2,500) |
| Teams already qualified for Championship Round | 3 |
| Teams already qualified for Championship Round | 3 | Cedevita | Zagreb | Dom Sportova (3,100) |
| Teams already qualified for Championship Round | 3 | Cibona | Zagreb | Dražen Petrović Basketball Hall (5,400) |
| Teams already qualified for Championship Round | 3 | Zadar | Zadar | Krešimir Ćosić Hall (8,500) |

Location of teams in the A-1 League 2013–14

== Regular season ==
| Clinched Champions league berth |

| # | Team | Pts | Pld | W | L | PF | PA | Diff |
|---|---|---|---|---|---|---|---|---|
| 1 | Zagreb | 31 | 18 | 13 | 5 | 1479 | 1344 | 135 |
| 2 | Šibenik | 30 | 18 | 12 | 6 | 1465 | 1416 | 49 |
| 3 | Kvarner 2010 | 30 | 18 | 12 | 6 | 1382 | 1264 | 118 |
| 4 | Alkar | 30 | 18 | 12 | 6 | 1430 | 1309 | 121 |
| 5 | Jolly JBŠ | 29 | 18 | 11 | 7 | 1399 | 1322 | 77 |
| 6 | Zabok | 29 | 18 | 11 | 7 | 1440 | 1294 | 146 |
| 7 | Split | 27 | 18 | 9 | 9 | 1465 | 1536 | -71 |
| 8 | VROS Darda | 22 | 18 | 4 | 14 | 1302 | 1421 | -119 |
| 9 | Križevci | 22 | 18 | 4 | 14 | 1370 | 1610 | -240 |
| 10 | Slavonski Brod | 20 | 18 | 2 | 16 | 1287 | 1502 | -216 |

Source: Scoresway.com

== Championship Round ==
| Clinched Playoffs berth |

| # | Team | Pts | Pld | W | L | PF | PA | Diff |
|---|---|---|---|---|---|---|---|---|
| 1 | Cedevita | 27 | 14 | 13 | 1 | 1252 | 1014 | +238 |
| 2 | Cibona | 26 | 14 | 12 | 2 | 1219 | 1025 | +194 |
| 3 | Zadar | 24 | 14 | 10 | 4 | 1168 | 1024 | +144 |
| 4 | Jolly JBŠ | 19 | 14 | 5 | 9 | 1010 | 1091 | -81 |
| 5 | Alkar | 19 | 14 | 5 | 9 | 1019 | 1130 | -111 |
| 6 | Zagreb | 18 | 14 | 4 | 10 | 1106 | 1205 | -99 |
| 7 | Kvarner 2010 | 18 | 14 | 4 | 10 | 962 | 1098 | -136 |
| 8 | Šibenik | 17 | 14 | 3 | 11 | 983 | 1132 | -149 |

== Relegation and Promotion Rounds ==
=== Relegation Round ===
| Relegation/Promotion Play off |

| # | Team | Pts | Pld | W | L | PF | PA | Diff |
|---|---|---|---|---|---|---|---|---|
| 1 | Zabok | 28 | 16 | 12 | 4 | 1353 | 1143 | +210 |
| 2 | Split | 25 | 16 | 9 | 7 | 1338 | 1331 | +7 |
| 3 | PF Križevci | 24 | 16 | 8 | 8 | 1261 | 1343 | -82 |
| 4 | VROS Darda | 23 | 16 | 7 | 9 | 1255 | 1246 | +9 |
| 5 | Slavonski Brod | 20 | 16 | 4 | 12 | 1203 | 1347 | -144 |

=== Promotion Round ===
| Promotion |
| Relegation/Promotion Play off |

| # | Team | Pts | Pld | W | L | PF | PA | Diff |
|---|---|---|---|---|---|---|---|---|
| 1 | Ribola Kaštela (Q) | 15 | 8 | 7 | 1 | | | +113 |
| 2 | Gorica | 14 | 8 | 6 | 2 | | | +93 |
| 3 | Škrljevo | 13 | 8 | 5 | 3 | | | +27 |
| 4 | Grafičar Ludbreg | 9 | 8 | 1 | 7 | | | -99 |
| 5 | Borovo | 8 | 8 | 1 | 7 | | | -136 |

=== Relegation/Promotion play-off ===
Relegation league 5th-placed team faces the 2nd-placed Promotion league side in a two-legged play-off. The winner on aggregate score after both matches will earn a spot in the 2014–15 A-1 League.

==== Gorica vs. Slavonski Brod ====
May 17
17:00

Report

| Gorica | 76–75 | Slavonski Brod |
Scoring by quarter: 11:21, 23:21, 22:19, 20:14
| Pts: Bundović 20 | | Pts: Karlović 20 |

Dvorana srednjih škola, Velika Gorica

May 20
18:00

Report

| Slavonski Brod | 75–58 | Gorica |
Scoring by quarter: 13:18, 21:9, 15:13, 26:18
| Pts: Ćosić 23 | | Pts: Primorac 18 |

Sportska dvorana Vijuš, Slavonski Brod

Slavonski Brod retained its A-1 League status.

== Playoffs ==
=== Bracket ===
Semifinals
1 | Cedevita | 2
4 | Jolly JBŠ | 0
2 | Cibona | 2
3 | Zadar | 0

Finals
1 | Cedevita | 3
2 | Cibona | 0

=== Semifinals ===
The semifinals are best-of-3 series.

==== Cedevita vs. Jolly JBŠ ====
May 24
18:45 CEST

Report

| Cedevita | 77–53 | Jolly JBŠ |
Scoring by quarter: 22:17, 20:4, 15:11, 20:21
| Pts: Bilan, Nurkić 15 | | Pts: Katura 15 |
1–0

Dom Sportova, Zagreb

May 27
20:30 CEST

Report

| Jolly JBŠ | 54–75 | Cedevita |
Scoring by quarter: 16:17, 15:22, 8:11, 15:25
| Pts: Smith 12 | | Pts: Nurkić 15 |
2–0

Sportska dvorana Baldekin, Šibenik

==== Cibona vs. Zadar ====
May 25
20:30 CEST

Report

| Cibona | 87–81 | Zadar |
Scoring by quarter: 25:15, 18:22, 22:15, 22:29
| Pts: Planinić 23 | | Pts: Lyons 19 |
1–0

Dražen Petrović Basketball Hall, Zagreb
Attendance: 800
Referees: Dubravko Muhvić, Sreten Radović, Davor Stojić

May 28
20:30 CEST

Report

| Zadar | 86–90 | Cibona |
Scoring by quarter: 24:14, 22:31, 26:27, 14:18
| Pts: Lyons 18 | | Pts: Šarić 28 |
2–0

Krešimir Ćosić Hall, Zadar
Attendance: 4,500
Referees: Siniša Herceg, Tomislav Vovk, Josip Radojković

=== Finals ===
The semifinals are best-of-5 series.

==== Cedevita vs. Cibona ====
June 03
20:00 CEST

Report

| Cedevita | 84–76 | Cibona |
Scoring by quarter: 26:13, 24:18, 15:29, 19:16
| Pts: Smith 17 | | Pts: Šarić 24 |
1–0

Dom Sportova, Zagreb

June 07
20:00 CEST

Report

| Cibona | 61–69 | Cedevita |
Scoring by quarter: 14:15, 18:22, 19:13, 10:19
| Pts: Šarić 17 | | Pts: Smith 19 |
2–0

Dražen Petrović Basketball Hall, Zagreb

June 03
20:00 CEST

Report

| Cedevita | 87–76 | Cibona |
Scoring by quarter: 28:24, 18:14, 20:17, 21:21
| Pts: Suton 23 | | Pts: Šarić and Blassingame 18 |
Cedevita wins series 3–0

Dom Sportova, Zagreb

2014 A-1 League
Cedevita Zagreb
1st title
