= Ante Delaš =

Croatian basketball player (born 1988)

No. 10 – Ribola Kaštela
- Position: Shooting guard
- League: First Men's Basketball League

Personal information
- Born: March 11, 1988 (age 38) Solin, SR Croatia, SFR Yugoslavia
- Listed height: 6 ft 6.7 in (2.00 m)

Career information
- NBA draft: 2010: undrafted
- Playing career: 2005–present

Career history
- 2005–2010: Split
- 2008–2009: →Trogir
- 2010: →Trogir
- 2010–2011: Alkar Sinj
- 2011–2013: Zadar
- 2013–2015: Cedevita
- 2015: Ribola Kaštela
- 2015–2016: Zadar
- 2016–2017: Belfius Mons-Hainaut
- 2017: Basket Agropoli
- 2017–2018: Anwil Włocławek
- 2018–2020: Steaua București
- 2020–2021: ZTE
- 2021–present: Ribola Kaštela

Career highlights
- 2× Croatian League champion (2014, 2015); Polish League champion (2018); 2× Croatian Cup winner (2014, 2015)

Ante Delaš (born March 11, 1988) is a Croatian professional basketball player for Ribola Kaštela of the Croatian second-tier First Men's Basketball League. He can play at both the point guard and shooting guard positions, making him a classical combo guard, despite his height (2.00 m) and thin physique.

== Professional career ==
Delaš grew up in KK Split and made his pro debut with the team in 2005. He was loaned to KK Trogir competing in the top and second level Croatian basketball leagues. After spending a season in top level Alkar Sinj he was sold to KK Zadar where he played another two seasons in the Croatian League. In the 2012–13 season Zadar surprisingly reached the finals of the play-offs with Delaš profiling himself both as a leader and a legitimate scoring threat. KK Zadar also competed in the 2012-13 Adriatic league season. In his debut season in this league Delaš averaged 6.2 points, 2.6 rebounds and 1.7 assists in 24 games. In the summer of 2013, he signed a three-year deal with Cedevita Zagreb. In June 2015, he left Cedevita.

After playing only one game for Kaštela Ribola in the Croatian League, in October 2015 he returned to Zadar. In June 2016, he left Zadar, and signed with Belfius Mons-Hainaut of the Basketball League Belgium Division I. On February 2, 2017, he parted ways with Mons-Hainaut. The next day, he signed with Basket Agropoli of the Italian Serie A2 Basket.

On August 22, 2017, Delaš signed a tryout contract with Lietkabelis Panevėžys. After one friendly game, he left the club for personal reasons. On August 31, 2017, he signed with Polish club Anwil Włocławek for the 2017–18 season. After spending a season in Poland in which his team won the championship, in September 2018 he moved to the Romanian side Steaua București.

In July 2020, Delaš moved to ZTE of the Hungarian League.

== International career ==
After being a part of Croatian youth national team selections, he was called up by coach Jasmin Repeša for the senior team. He was a member of the Croatian team at the 2013 European Championship, playing only a minor role in Croatia's 4th-place performance.

== Personal life ==
Ante Delaš is the older brother of Mario Delaš, who is also a professional basketball player, and with whom he played with in Split, Cedevita and the Croatian national basketball team.
