= Dario Šarić =

Croatian basketball player (born 1994)

- Šarić with Anadolu Efes in 2026

No. 5 – Anadolu Efes
- Position: Power forward
- League: BSL; EuroLeague

Personal information
- Born: 8 April 1994 (age 32) Šibenik, Croatia
- Listed height: 6 ft 11 in (2.11 m)
- Listed weight: 225 lb (102 kg)

Career information
- NBA draft: 2014: 1st round, 12th overall pick
- Drafted by: Orlando Magic
- Playing career: 2009–present

Career history
- 2009: Zrinjevac
- 2009–2012: Zagreb
- 2010–2011: →Dubrava
- 2012–2014: Cibona
- 2014–2016: Anadolu Efes
- 2016–2018: Philadelphia 76ers
- 2018–2019: Minnesota Timberwolves
- 2019–2023: Phoenix Suns
- 2023: Oklahoma City Thunder
- 2023–2024: Golden State Warriors
- 2024–2025: Denver Nuggets
- 2025–2026: Sacramento Kings
- 2026–present: Anadolu Efes

Career highlights
- NBA All-Rookie First Team (2017); EuroLeague 50–40–90 club (2016); VTB United League Supercup winner (2026); Turkish Cup winner (2015); Turkish Presidential Cup winner (2015); ABA League champion (2014); ABA League MVP (2014); ABA League Final Four MVP (2014); ABA League Top Scorer (2014); ABA League Top Prospect (2014); ABA League Ideal Five (2014); ABA League rebounding leader (2014); Croatian League champion (2013); 2× Croatian Cup winner (2010, 2013); Croatian League Finals MVP (2013); 2× All-Croatian League First Team (2013, 2014); All-Croatian League Second Team (2011); 2× All-Croatian League Forward of the Year (2013, 2014); 2× FIBA European Young Player of the Year (2013, 2014); FIBA Europe Under-18 Championship MVP (2012); FIBA Europe Under-16 Championship MVP (2010)
- Stats at NBA.com
- Stats at Basketball Reference
Medals
Men's basketball
Representing Croatia
FIBA Europe Under-18 Championship
Gold medal – first place	2012 Latvia/Lithuania	U-18 Team
European U-16 Championship
Gold medal – first place	2010 Montenegro	U-16 Team

Dario Šarić (Croatian pronunciation: [dâːrio ʃǎːritɕ]; born 8 April 1994) is a Croatian professional basketball player for Anadolu Efes of the Basketbol Süper Ligi (BSL). He was selected with the 12th overall pick in the 2014 NBA draft. He also represents the senior Croatia national team. He joined the Philadelphia 76ers in 2016 playing two seasons for the team before being traded to the Minnesota Timberwolves. After a season with the team he was traded to the Phoenix Suns in the 2019 offseason and played 4 seasons for the team before being dealt to the Oklahoma City Thunder in the 2023 trade deadline. That following offseason, he joined the Golden State Warriors. He has also played for the Denver Nuggets and the Sacramento Kings.

== Professional career ==
=== Early years ===
Šarić began his professional career in 2009 with Zrinjevac. After joining Zagreb mid-way through the 2009–10 season, and spending much of the 2010–11 season on loan with Dubrava, Šarić won the Città di Roma EuroLeague (IJT) in May 2011, alongside teammates, Mario Hezonja and Dominik Mavra, and progressed to the Final Four of the tournament, where his team eventually won. After he had registered a triple-double in the final game with 19 points, 14 rebounds and 10 assists, in addition to 10 drawn fouls, he was named the MVP of the tournament.

In 2010 and 2011, Šarić was nominated for the FIBA Europe Young Player of the Year Award.

In 2012, he was selected to play for the World Team, for the second year in a row, at the Nike Hoop Summit in Portland, Oregon. In the all-star game, the international players of the World Team beat the US team, with Šarić scoring 13 points and leading in rebounds (14) and assists (5).

He signed with Bilbao Basket and was loaned to Split in 2012. However, due to a sanction by FIBA, forcing the Spanish team to pay a buyout of €550,000, he didn't sign with Bilbao. After that, he trained with Split, but was not playing games with them.

=== Cibona Zagreb (2012–2014) ===
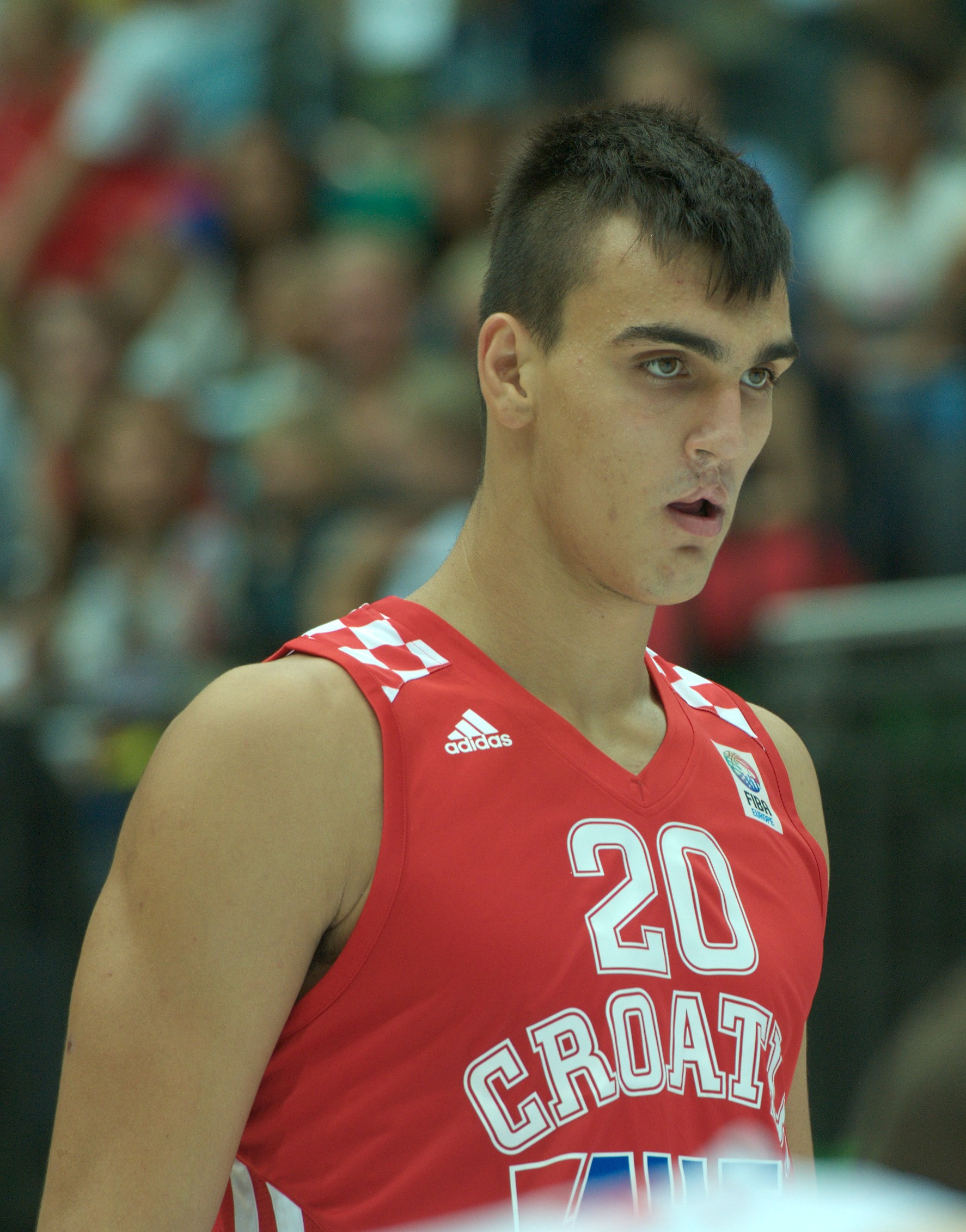
Šarić in 2012

In November 2012, Šarić signed a four-year contract with the Croatian club Cibona.

Again, in 2012, he was nominated for the FIBA Europe Young Men's Player of the Year Award, finishing second.

Šarić had initially decided to declare for the 2013 NBA draft on 4 April 2013. However, two days after the initial declaration, he decided not to participate in it and had planned to play for KK Cibona for at least one more season. Šarić would, however, officially declare himself for the draft once again on 14 April 2013. Finally, Šarić withdrew from the draft altogether, because of his desire to stay in Europe for another year, to gain experience.

In 2013, he won the Croatian National Cup and Croatian League championship with Cibona, and won the MVP award for the Croatian finals.

He was named the 2013 FIBA Europe Young Player of the Year in February 2014. In April 2014, he was selected into the ideal team and also named the MVP of the ABA League, averaging 16.7 points, 9.7 rebounds and 3.2 assists in the regular season. In the Final Four of the competition, Cibona eventually won the league championship, and Šarić was also proclaimed the MVP of the final four. He was also named the ABA League Top Prospect for the 2013–14 season.

=== Anadolu Efes (2014–2016) ===
On 24 June 2014, Šarić signed a 2+1 contract with the Turkish team Anadolu Efes. Cibona also received US$1.2 million in the name of buyout from Anadolu Efes, as Šarić was still under contract with them. He signed the offer days before the 2014 NBA draft commenced. The Orlando Magic selected Šarić 12th overall in the 2014 draft, but his rights were traded to the Philadelphia 76ers for Elfrid Payton on draft night. After the draft, Šarić stated that he planned on playing in Europe for at least one more year, but promised that he would eventually play in the NBA.

At the beginning of the 2014–15 season, Šarić's father criticized Efes's head coach, Dušan Ivković, for not putting Dario in the roster for the Turkish Super League games, openly threatening possible termination of the player's contract, if the situation didn't improve. He was named the EuroLeague 2014–15 season's MVP of the Month for the month of November, becoming the youngest player in EuroLeague history to win the monthly MVP award. Over 4 EuroLeague games in November, he averaged 15.5 points and 7.8 rebounds per game.

In January 2015, he was named the 2014 FIBA Europe Young Men's Player of the Year, his second consecutive award.

Anadolu Efes finished their participation in the EuroLeague season, after they lost their quarterfinal playoffs series to Real Madrid, by a 3–1 series result. Over 27 EuroLeague games played in 2014–15 season, Šarić averaged 9.9 points, 6.4 rebounds, and 2.3 assists per game. In May 2016, he finished second, for the second straight season, in the EuroLeague Rising Star voting.

=== Philadelphia 76ers (2016–2018) ===
On 15 July 2016, Šarić signed with the Philadelphia 76ers. In just his third NBA game, on 1 November, Šarić scored 21 points in a 103–101 loss to the Orlando Magic. On 3 December, he had a second 21-point game in a 107–106 loss to the Boston Celtics. On 9 February 2017, Šarić had a 26-point effort in a 112–111 win over Orlando. On 17 February, he participated in the Rising Stars Challenge during the All-Star Weekend. On 2 March, Šarić was named Eastern Conference Rookie of the Month for games played in February, after his injured teammate, Joel Embiid, had won each month prior. On 9 March, he had a 28-point effort in a 114–108 overtime loss to the Portland Trail Blazers. Three days later, Šarić scored a career-high 29 points in a 118–116 win over the Los Angeles Lakers. He surpassed that mark on 24 March, scoring 32 points in a 117–107 win over the Chicago Bulls. On 3 April, Šarić was named Eastern Conference Rookie of the Month for the second straight month. Following the season, he was named to the NBA All-Rookie First Team and finished second in NBA Rookie of the Year voting, behind Malcolm Brogdon.

On 7 November 2017, Šarić scored a then season-high 25 points in a 104–97 win over the Utah Jazz. It was the 76ers' fifth straight win, their longest since the 2011–12 season. On 18 December, he scored 20 of his 27 points in the second half of the 76ers' 117–115 loss to the Chicago Bulls. Three days later, he had a near triple-double with 18 points, 10 rebounds and nine assists in a 114–109 loss to the Toronto Raptors. On 31 December, Šarić tied a season high with 27 points in a 123–110 win over the Phoenix Suns.

Šarić was named a Rising Star once again during All-Star Weekend 2018, competing for the World team alongside 76ers teammates Joel Embiid and Ben Simmons.

In Game 4 of the 76ers' second-round playoff series against the Celtics, Šarić scored a game-high 25 points in a 103–92 win, helping Philadelphia cut the series deficit to 3–1. The 76ers went on to lose to the Celtics in Game 5, despite Šarić's 27 points and 10 rebounds in a 114–112 loss.

=== Minnesota Timberwolves (2018–2019) ===
On 12 November 2018, Šarić was traded to the Minnesota Timberwolves, along with Jerryd Bayless, Robert Covington and a 2022 second-round pick, in exchange for Jimmy Butler and Justin Patton. He made his debut for the Timberwolves two days later, scoring nine points in 20 minutes off the bench in a 107–100 win over the New Orleans Pelicans. On 24 November, he had 19 points and 14 rebounds in a 111–96 win over the Chicago Bulls.

Šarić was unhappy with his bench role in Minnesota and preferred to start. Since his starting stint with the Timberwolves, Šarić did not see much time as a starter.

=== Phoenix Suns (2019–2023) ===
On 6 July 2019, Šarić, along with the draft rights to Cameron Johnson, were traded to the Phoenix Suns in exchange for the draft rights to Jarrett Culver, completing a trade set on draft day. On 24 November, Šarić scored 18 points and grabbed a career-high 17 rebounds in a 116–104 loss to the Denver Nuggets. He later matched his career-high of 17 rebounds, scoring 19 points this time around, in a 121–119 overtime loss to the San Antonio Spurs on 14 December in Mexico City. After losing his starting spot to Cameron Johnson in the 2020 NBA Bubble during the scrimmage games, Šarić returned as a starter on 10 August, getting 16 points and 9 rebounds in a blowout 128–101 win over the Oklahoma City Thunder. The Suns eventually ended their season with an 8–0 run in the bubble.

Due to the success he had both as a starter last season and as a sixth man off the bench in the 2020 bubble setting, Šarić signed a three-year, $27 million extension with the Suns on 28 November 2020. On 13 January 2021, Šarić was revealed as one of two Suns players to have caught COVID-19 a day after playing the Washington Wizards, who had multiple players catch the virus after that match. While he officially missed only four games to the virus, Šarić remained inactive for a month with leg injuries also affecting him for at least the first half of the season. Overall, he missed 13 straight games that were scheduled at the time, excluding three suspended games due to initial infection, before returning to action on 13 February against the Philadelphia 76ers. On 2 March, Šarić lead the Suns in scoring with a season-high 21 points off the bench in a 114–104 win over the defending champion Los Angeles Lakers. On 6 July 2021, in Game 1 of the 2021 NBA Finals against the Milwaukee Bucks, Šarić suffered a torn anterior cruciate ligament in his right knee, and on the following day the Suns announced that Šarić would be out indefinitely. The Suns went on to lose the series in 6 games.

Šarić underwent surgery on his ACL in early August 2021 and missed the entire 2021–22 NBA season.

On May 5, 2022, Šarić underwent meniscus surgery and was ruled out indefinitely. He returned in time for the start of the 2022–23 season.

=== Oklahoma City Thunder (2023) ===
On February 9, 2023, Šarić was traded, alongside a 2029 second-round pick and cash considerations, to the Oklahoma City Thunder in exchange for Darius Bazley. Šarić made his Thunder debut on February 15, recording 12 points and five rebounds in a 133–96 win over the Houston Rockets.

=== Golden State Warriors (2023–2024) ===
On July 12, 2023, Šarić signed a minimum deal with the Golden State Warriors. Šarić made 64 appearances (nine starts) for Golden State during the 2023–24 NBA season, averaging 8.0 points, 4.4 rebounds, and 2.3 assists.

=== Denver Nuggets (2024–2025) ===
On July 12, 2024, Šarić signed a two-year, $10.6 million contract with the Denver Nuggets. He was sparsely used as part of Denver's rotation during the 2024–25 NBA season, averaging 3.5 points, 3.1 rebounds, and 1.4 assists across 16 appearances (four starts).

=== Sacramento Kings (2025–2026) ===
On July 13, 2025, Šarić was traded to the Sacramento Kings in exchange for Jonas Valančiūnas. Šarić made only five appearances off of the bench for Sacramento during the 2025–26 NBA season, averaging 1.0 point, 1.2 rebounds, and 0.4 assists.

On February 1, 2026, Šarić was traded to the Chicago Bulls in a three-team trade that also involved the Cleveland Cavaliers. Two days later, on February 3, Šarić was traded again to the Detroit Pistons as part of another three-team deal that also involved the Minnesota Timberwolves. On February 9, Šarić was waived by the Pistons.

=== Return to Anadolu Efes (2026–present) ===
On June 16, 2026, Šarić signed with Anadolu Efes of the Basketbol Süper Ligi (BSL), returning to the club for a second stint.

== National team career ==
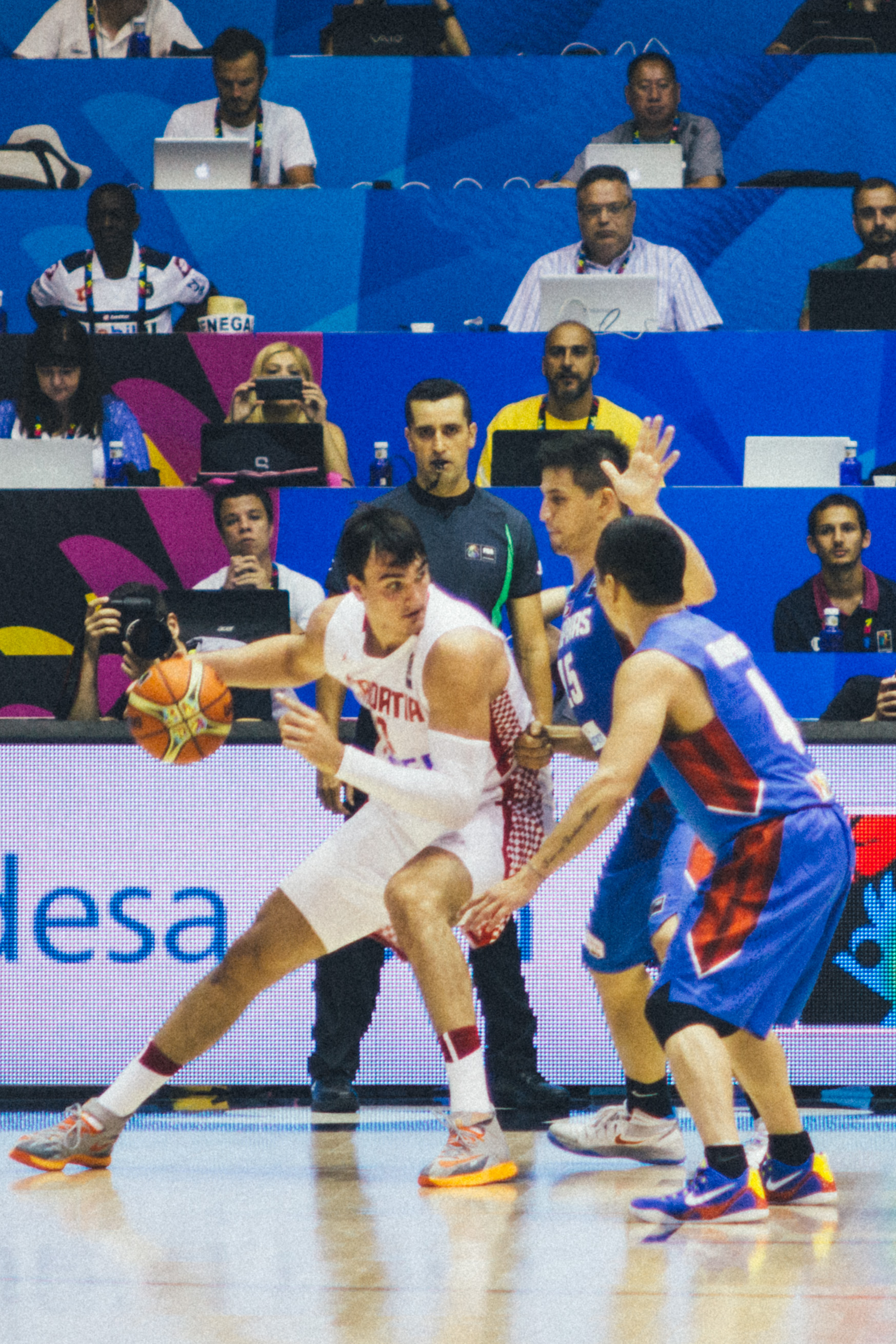
Šarić at the 2014 World Cup

While playing with Croatia's Under-16 national team, Šarić was named the Most Valuable Player of the 2010 FIBA Europe Under-16 Championship in a unanimous vote, after leading the tournament in scoring (24.3 ppg) and rebounding (11.5 rpg), and finishing second in assists (5.8 apg). He registered a triple-double (30 points, 11 rebounds, 11 assists) in the final, becoming only the second player to do so (after Ricky Rubio in 2006).

He won a gold medal with Croatia's Under-18 national team in the 2012 FIBA Europe Under-18 Championship, where he finished first in scoring (25.6 ppg) and second in rebounds (10.1 rpg). Soon after scoring 39 points to lead Croatia to victory in the gold medal game against Lithuania, Šarić was voted unanimously as tournament MVP.

Šarić also played with Croatia's Under-19 national team in the 2011 FIBA Under-19 World Cup, where he finished fourth in scoring (18.1 ppg) and third in rebounds (10.1 rpg), despite being one of the youngest participants at 17 years of age. He also played at the 2013 FIBA Under-19 World Cup, where he averaged 20.3 points, 11.2 rebounds, 4.9 assists per game, and was named to the All-Tournament Team.

Šarić represented the senior men's Croatia men's national basketball team at a major FIBA tournament for the first time at EuroBasket 2013, where he averaged 5.5 points, 3.2 rebounds, and 0.9 assists per game. He then played with Croatia's senior men's team at the 2014 FIBA World Cup, where he averaged 11.7 points, 6.7 rebounds, and 2.3 assists per game.

During the 2014 FIBA World Cup, Šarić had six teeth knocked out in a match against Argentina. He stayed in the game for a few minutes and knocked down a three-pointer before being benched to receive medical attention.

He also played with Croatia at the EuroBasket 2015, where they were eliminated in the eighth finals by Czech Republic. Over 6 tournament games, he averaged 9.7 points, 6.3 rebounds, and 2.7 assists per game, on 44.7% shooting from the field.

Šarić played with Croatia at the 2016 Olympic games, where they were eliminated in the quarter-finals by Serbia. Over 6 tournament games, he averaged 33.1 minutes, 11.8 points, 6.7 rebounds and 3.2 assists per game, on 43.1% shooting from the field.

Šarić represented Croatia at the EuroBasket 2017. Croatia was eliminated in the round of 16 by Russia. Over 5 tournament games, he averaged 32.4 minutes, 14.8 points, 6.7 rebounds, and 2.5 assists per game, on 37.4% field goal shooting.

In 2022, after recovering from meniscus surgery, Šarić played for the Croatian national team during the EuroBasket 2022 tournament.

== Personal life ==
Šarić is married to Karla Sarić. They have a son born in 2022 named Niko.

Šarić was born with a cleft lip. He is the son of basketball-playing parents, Predrag and Veselinka. His nicknames include "The Homie", "Super Dario" and "Šiši" (pronounced "shi-shi").

In 2018, Šarić announced that he would be releasing a documentary about his life titled Always the Same. It was released on March 1, 2020.

Šarić has stated that sharks are his favorite animal.

Šarić has stated that he keeps in touch with former 76ers teammates Furkan Korkmaz and Timothé Luwawu-Cabarrot.

== Career statistics ==
Legend
GP	Games played	GS	Games started	MPG	Minutes per game
FG%	Field-goal percentage	3P%	3-point field-goal percentage	FT%	Free-throw percentage
RPG	Rebounds per game	APG	Assists per game	SPG	Steals per game
BPG	Blocks per game	PPG	Points per game	PIR	Performance index rating
**Bold**	Career high

=== NBA ===
==== Regular season ====
Year	Team	GP	GS	MPG	FG%	3P%	FT%	RPG	APG	SPG	BPG	PPG
2016–17	Philadelphia	**81**	36	26.3	.411	.311	.782	6.3	2.2	.4	**.7**	12.8
2017–18	Philadelphia	78	**73**	29.6	.453	**.393**	.860	**6.7**	**2.6**	.3	**.7**	**14.6**
2018–19	Philadelphia	13	13	**30.5**	.364	.300	.900	6.6	2.0	.2	.3	11.1
2018–19	Minnesota	68	28	23.9	.454	.383	.875	5.5	1.5	**.6**	.1	10.5
2019–20	Phoenix	66	51	24.7	.476	.357	.844	6.2	1.9	**.6**	.2	10.7
2020–21	Phoenix	50	4	17.4	.447	.348	.848	3.8	1.3	**.6**	.1	8.7
2022–23	Phoenix	37	12	14.4	.427	.391	.818	3.8	1.5	.4	.1	5.8
2022–23	Oklahoma City	20	0	13.7	**.515**	.391	.844	3.3	.9	.4	.1	7.4
2023–24	Golden State	64	9	17.2	.466	.376	.849	4.4	2.3	.5	.2	8.0
2024–25	Denver	16	4	13.1	.362	.269	.700	3.1	1.4	.4	.1	3.5
2025–26	Sacramento	5	0	8.2	.167	.333	**1.000**	1.2	.4	.0	.0	1.0
Career		498	230	22.3	.443	.360	.838	5.3	1.9	.6	.2	10.3

==== Playoffs ====
Year	Team	GP	GS	MPG	FG%	3P%	FT%	RPG	APG	SPG	BPG	PPG
2018	Philadelphia	10	**10**	**32.9**	.421	.385	.850	**7.3**	**3.5**	**1.0**	**.4**	**17.2**
2021	Phoenix	**14**	0	10.5	**.467**	**.444**	**.929**	2.5	1.0	.1	.1	4.5
Career		24	10	19.8	.432	.400	.870	4.5	2.0	.5	.2	9.8

=== EuroLeague ===
Year	Team	GP	GS	MPG	FG%	3P%	FT%	RPG	APG	SPG	BPG	PPG	PIR
2011–12	Zagreb	4	3	15.0	.200	.167	.500	4.5	.5	.3	.3	2.0	.8
2014–15	Anadolu Efes	**27**	**22**	**24.4**	.433	.306	.707	**6.4**	**2.3**	**.7**	.4	9.9	12.6
2015–16	Anadolu Efes	24	18	22.4	**.500**	**.403**	**.939**	5.8	1.5	.5	**.5**	**11.7**	**13.5**
Career		55	43	22.9	.457	.350	.783	6.0	1.8	.6	.4	10.1	12.1

== Awards ==
=== Club honours ===
Junior club honours

- Città di Roma Tournament (2010, 2011)
- EuroLeague Junior Tournament (2011)

Senior club honours

- Croatian League Champion (2013)
- Croatian Cup Winner (2013)
- ABA League Champion (2014)
- Turkish Cup Winner (2015)
- Turkish President's Cup Winner (2015)

=== Individual ===
Junior honours

- 2010 Albert Schweitzer Tournament: Burkhard Wildermuth-Award
- 2010 FIBA Europe Under-16 Championship: All-Tournament Team, MVP
- Città di Roma Tournament: All-Tournament Team, MVP (2010, 2011)
- 2011 EuroLeague Junior Tournament: All-Tournament Team, MVP
- 2012 FIBA Europe Under-18 Championship: All-Tournament Team, MVP
- 2013 FIBA Under-19 World Cup: All-Tournament Team

Senior honours

- Croatian League Finals MVP (2013)
- ABA League: First Team, Season MVP, Final Four MVP (2014)
- ABA League Top Scorer (2014)
- ABA League Top Prospect (2014)
- FIBA European Young Player of the Year (2013, 2014)
- NBA All-Rookie First Team (2017)

== See also ==
- List of European basketball players in the United States
