= Mece =

Mece may refer to:

== People ==
- Neti Meçe (born 1995), Albanian football player

== Places ==
- Mece, Croatia
- Mecé, France

== Other ==
- MECE principle, mutually exclusive and collectively exhaustive
