= Damir Rančić =

Croatian basketball player and coach

Split
- Title: Head coach
- League: Croatian League; Europe Cup

Personal information
- Born: 23 June 1983 (age 43) Split, SR Croatia, SFR Yugoslavia
- Listed height: 6 ft 6 in (1.98 m)
- Listed weight: 215 lb (98 kg)

Career information
- NBA draft: 2005: undrafted
- Playing career: 2000–2018
- Positions: Shooting guard, small forward
- Coaching career: 2018–present

Career history

Playing
- 2000–2001: Solin
- 2001–2005: Split
- 2005–2006: Cibona
- 2006–2007: Panellinios
- 2007: Kyiv
- 2007–2008: Panellinios
- 2008–2010: Zadar
- 2010: Obradoiro CAB
- 2010: Panellinios
- 2010–2012: Zagreb
- 2013: Helios Domžale
- 2013–2014: Ribola Kaštela
- 2014: Pallacanestro Firenze
- 2014–2015: Ribola Kaštela
- 2015–2016: Soproni
- 2016–2018: Split

Coaching
- 2018–2025: Ribola Kaštela
- 2026–present: Split

Career highlights
- 3× Croatian League (2003, 2006, 2011); 2× Croatian Cup (2004, 2011); Ukrainian Cup (2007); Croatian Cup F4 MVP (2004); Croatian All-Star Game MVP (2005); Ukrainian Cup MVP (2007); Mediterranean Games MVP (2009)
Medals
Men's basketball
Representing Croatia
Mediterranean Games
Gold medal – first place	2009 Pescara	Team competition

Damir Rančić (born 23 June 1983) is a Croatian professional basketball coach and former player, who currently serves as the head coach for Split of the Croatian League and the Europe Cup.

== Pro career ==
Rančić was born in Split and began his professional career in 2000 with Solin. He then moved to Split in 2001. In 2005, he moved to Cibona Zagreb. He then joined Panellinios, before going to Kyiv. He then returned to Panellinios before moving to Zadar. In 2010, he joined Obradoiro CAB, before returning once again to Panellinios, but left the team soon after for personal reasons.

After retiring as player due to chronicle back problems, in October 2018 he took up coaching Ribola Kaštela, a club he formerly played for.

== Croatian national team ==
Rančić was a member of the Croatian junior national teams. He played at the 1999 FIBA Europe Under-16 Championship. He has also been a member of the senior men's Croatian national basketball team. He played at the EuroBasket 2005 and he won the gold medal at the 2009 Mediterranean Games, where he was also voted the tournament's MVP.
