= Jason George (basketball) =

German basketball player (born 2001)

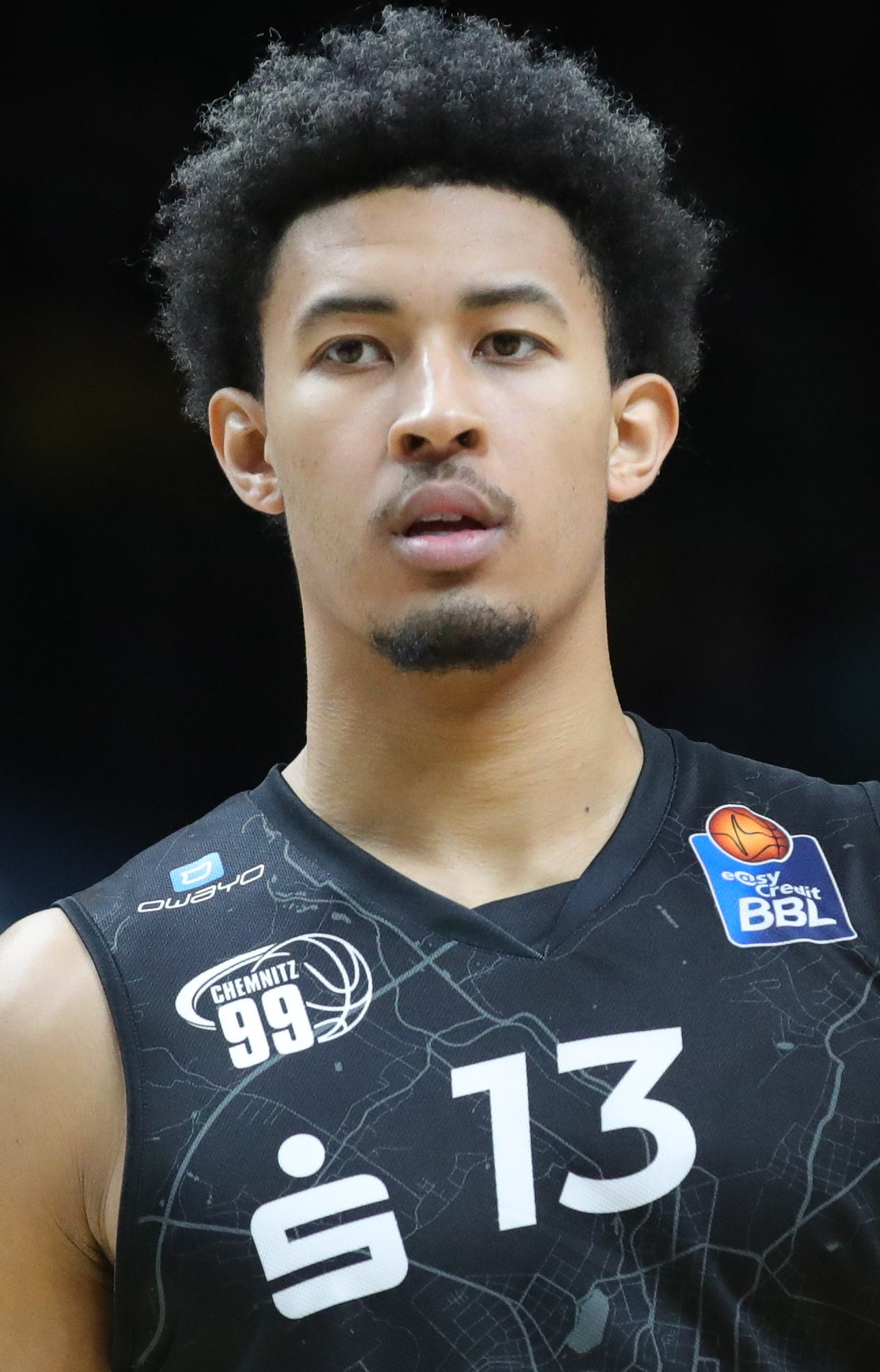
- George in 2023

No. 11 – PS Karlsruhe Lions
- Position: Small forward / shooting guard
- League: ProA

Personal information
- Born: May 21, 2001 (age 25)
- Listed height: 6 ft 6 in (1.98 m)
- Listed weight: 202 lb (92 kg)

Career information
- Playing career: 2018–present

Career history
- 2018–2025: Bayern Munich
- 2018–2021: → Bayern Munich II
- 2022–2024: → Niners Chemnitz
- 2025: BG Hessing Leitershofen
- 2025–present: PS Karlsruhe Lions

Jason George (born May 21, 2001) is a German professional basketball player for PS Karlsruhe Lions of the German ProA. He plays as a swingman. George represented the German national basketball team during the 2016 FIBA U16 European Championship and the 2017 FIBA U18 European Championship.
