= Aleksandar Šćepanović =

Croatian basketball coach and former player

KK Kvarner 2010
- Title: Assistant coach
- League: Basketball Bundesliga

Personal information
- Born: 11 December 1982 (age 43) Rijeka, Croatia
- Listed height: 1.98 m (6 ft 6 in)
- Listed weight: 95 kg (209 lb)

Career information
- Playing career: 1999–2011
- Position: Shooting guard / Small forward
- Coaching career: 2013–present

Career history

Playing
- 1999–2001: HNK Rijeka
- 2002–2007: KK Kvarner
- 2008–2010: KK Dubrovnik

Coaching
- 2013–2014: Kvarner Rijeka (assistant)
- 2014–2015: KIT SC Gequos Karlsruhe
- 2015–2017: PS Karlsruhe Lions
- 2017–2021: Mitteldeutscher BC (assistant)
- 2021–2025: PS Karlsruhe Lions
- 2025: Mitteldeutscher BC (assistant)
- 2025–present: KK Kvarner 2010

Career highlights
- As player: Croatian League All-Star Game (2007); As coach: Eurobasket.com All-German ProA Coach of the Year (2024); German ProA champion (2024)
Medals
Men's basketball
Representing Croatia
FIBA Europe Under-20 Championship
Silver medal – second place	2017 Oradea	U20 Team
Silver medal – second place	2018 Chemnitz	U20 Team

Aleksandar Šćepanović (born 11 December 1982) is a Croatian professional basketball coach and former player who currently serves as head coach for KK Kvarner 2010 in Croatia's Premijer liga. A versatile guard-forward during his playing days, Šćepanović competed mainly in the Croatian League, before transitioning into a coaching career in Germany.

== Playing career ==
Šćepanović started his professional career with Kantrida Rijeka in 1999, where he posted strong offensive numbers. He went on to play for KK Kvarner.

His most notable seasons was with KK Dubrovnik, where in 2009–10 he averaged 13.0 points per game while shooting nearly 46% from three-point range.

== Coaching career ==
Šćepanović began coaching in 2013 as an assistant at Kvarner Rijeka. He then moved to Germany to become head coach of KIT SC Gequos Karlsruhe in the Regionalliga. He led PS Karlsruhe Lions through a series of promotions and deep playoff runs from 2015 to 2017, winning the Regionalliga South-West in 2016 and reaching the ProB finals in 2017.

He served as assistant coach for Mitteldeutscher BC from 2017 to 2021 in the German Basketball Bundesliga, before returning to PS Karlsruhe Lions as head coach. Under his leadership, the team won the German ProA title in 2024 and he was named Eurobasket.com's Coach of the Year.

In May 2025, after six years at the helm, Šćepanović and the PS Karlsruhe Lions mutually agreed to part ways.

In June 2025, he returned to Mitteldeutscher BC as an assistant coach for the 2025–26 Basketball Bundesliga season. He left the club on October 6th, 2025. Šćepanović returned to his native Croatia and on October 15th, 2025 was appointed head coach of Premijer liga side KK Kvarner 2010.

=== National team coaching ===
Šćepanović was also an assistant coach for the Croatia men's national under-20 basketball team at the 2017 FIBA U20 European Championship Division B in Oradea, Romania, and at the 2018 FIBA U20 European Championship in Chemnitz, Germany. The team earned silver medals in both tournaments.

== Personal life ==
Fluent in Croatian, German, and English, Šćepanović is respected for his methodical preparation and player development focus.
