= KK Crikvenica =

Coordinates: 45°10′23.7″N 14°41′25″E

- Nickname: Kirci
- Leagues: A-1 Liga
- Founded: 1975
- History: 1975–present
- Arena: Gradska sportska dvorana Crikvenica, Crikvenica (capacity: )
- Location: Crikvenica, Croatia
- Team colors: Navy and White
- Website: kkcrikvenica.comli.com
| Home | Away |

Košarkaški klub Crikvenica (English: Crikvenica Basketball Club) is a professional basketball club based in Crikvenica, Croatia.

== Notable players ==
- (Croatia) Goran Vrbanc
