= Demond Greene =

German basketball coach

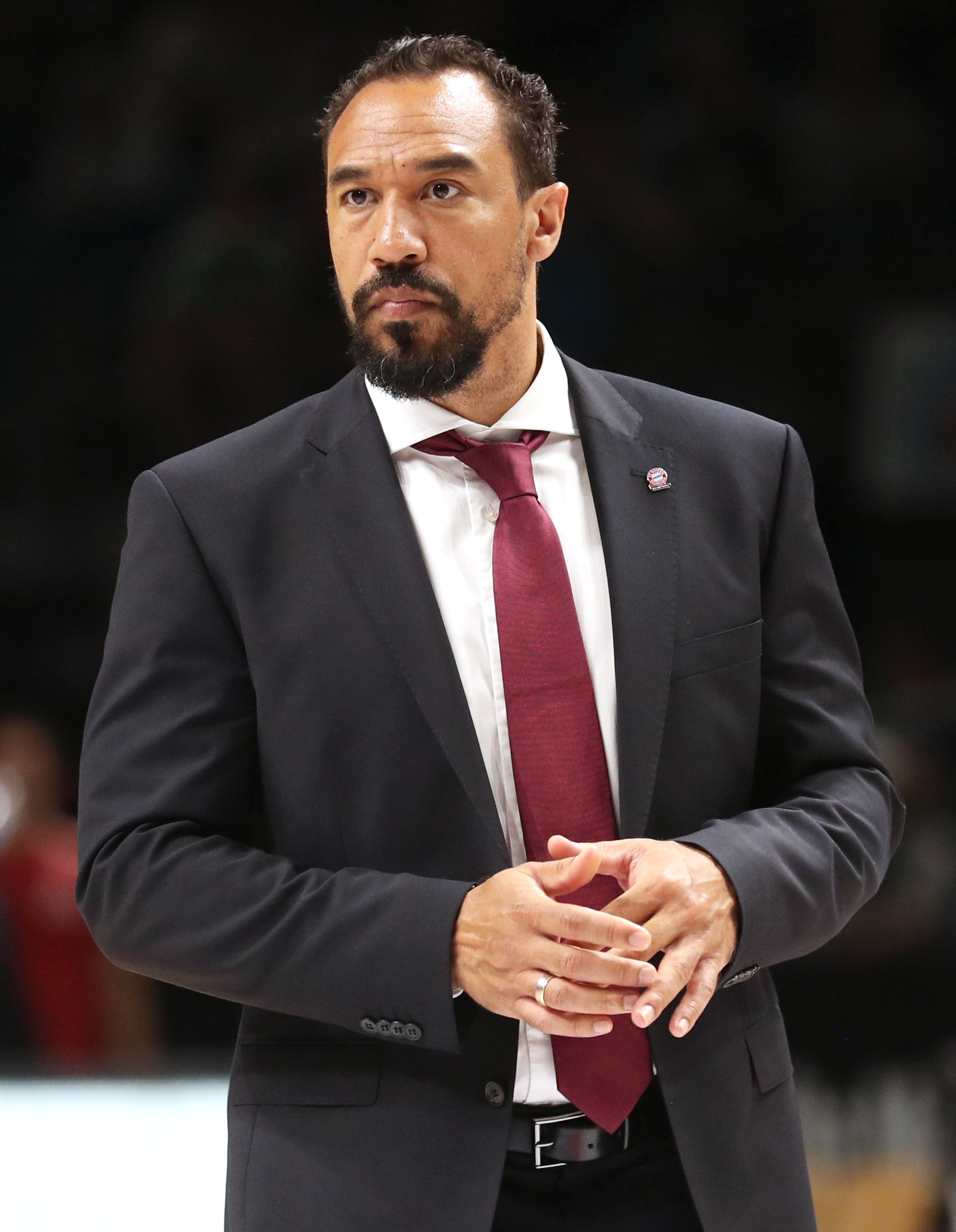
- Greene in 2022

PS Karlsruhe Lions
- Title: Head coach
- League: ProA

Personal information
- Born: 15 June 1979 (age 47) Fort Hood, Texas, U.S.
- Listed height: 1.85 m (6 ft 1 in)
- Listed weight: 95 kg (209 lb)

Career information
- NBA draft: 2001: undrafted
- Playing career: 1997–2014
- Position: Shooting guard
- Number: 24
- Coaching career: 2015–present

Career history

Playing
- 1997–2002: DJK Würzburg
- 2002–2005: Bayer Leverkusen
- 2005–2007: Alba Berlin
- 2007–2009: Brose Baskets
- 2009–2010: Olympia Larissa
- 2010–2014: Bayern Munich

Coaching
- 2018–2020: Bayern Munich II
- 2020–2025: Bayern Munich (assistant)
- 2025–present: PS Karlsruhe Lions

Career highlights
- As player: German League champion (2014); German Cup winner (2006); 4× German League All-Star (2002, 2005, 2006, 2008); German League Newcomer of the Year (2004); No. 24 retired by Bayern Munich; As Coach: German Cup winner (2021)
Medals
Men's basketball
Representing Germany
EuroBasket
Silver medal – second place	2005 Serbia and Montenegro	National Team

Demond Greene (born 15 June 1979) is a German–American professional basketball coach and former player. He is the current head coach for PS Karlsruhe Lions of the ProA. He played professionally for several seasons in, amongst others, the EuroLeague, the Greek Basket League and the German Basketball Bundesliga. Greene was a member of the Germany national team for several years and appeared with the team on both the FIBA World Championship and the Olympics.

== Early life ==
Greene was born in Fort Hood, Texas, to an American father and German mother. The family later moved to Aschaffenburg in Germany where he grew up.

== Professional career ==
Greene played with the number 24 for Bayern Munich from 2010 to 2014. Before transferring to Munich he played one season for the Greek club GS Olympia Larissa of the Greek Basket League. Before that he played two years for Brose Baskets from Bamberg and one year for Alba Berlin. During his time at Bayer Giants Leverkusen (2002–2005), he became one of the best German shooters. From 1997 to 2002 Greene played with DJK Würzburg, where he was a teammate of 13-time NBA All-Star Dirk Nowitzki.

== National team career ==
Greene was a member of the senior German national basketball team. He played at the EuroBaskets of 2005, 2007, and 2009; and also at the FIBA World Cups of 2006 and 2010. He also played at the Summer Olympic Games in 2008.

In all competitions, he averaged 7.3 points, 1.8 rebounds, and 0.7 assists per game.

== Career statistics ==
Legend
GP	Games played	GS	Games started	MPG	Minutes per game
FG%	Field-goal percentage	3P%	3-point field-goal percentage	FT%	Free-throw percentage
RPG	Rebounds per game	APG	Assists per game	SPG	Steals per game
BPG	Blocks per game	PPG	Points per game	PIR	Performance index rating
**Bold**	Career high

=== EuroLeague ===
Year	Team	GP	GS	MPG	FG%	3P%	FT%	RPG	APG	SPG	BPG	PPG	PIR
2007–08	Bamberg	**11**	**11**	**27.0**	**.476**	**.393**	**1.000**	**1.5**	**1.4**	**1.2**	**.0**	**9.2**	**6.1**
Career		11	11	27.0	.476	.393	1.000	1.5	1.4	1.2	.0	9.2	6.1

== Coaching career ==
Until 2018, he served as coach in the Bayern Munich youth set-up, from 2018 to 2020 he was the head coach of Bayern's reserve team and was named an assistant coach of the Bayern Bundesliga squad in 2020.

On June 4, 2025, he signed with PS Karlsruhe Lions of the ProA as head coach.

== Personal life ==
Greene's father is African American, and his mother is German.
