= PS Karlsruhe Lions =

- Leagues: ProA
- Founded: 1961; 65 years ago
- Arena: Europahalle
- Capacity: 3,500
- Location: Karlsruhe, Germany
- President: Danijel Ljubić
- Head coach: Demond Greene
- Team captain: Julian Albus
- Championships: 1 ProA
- Website: psk-lions.de
Home	Away

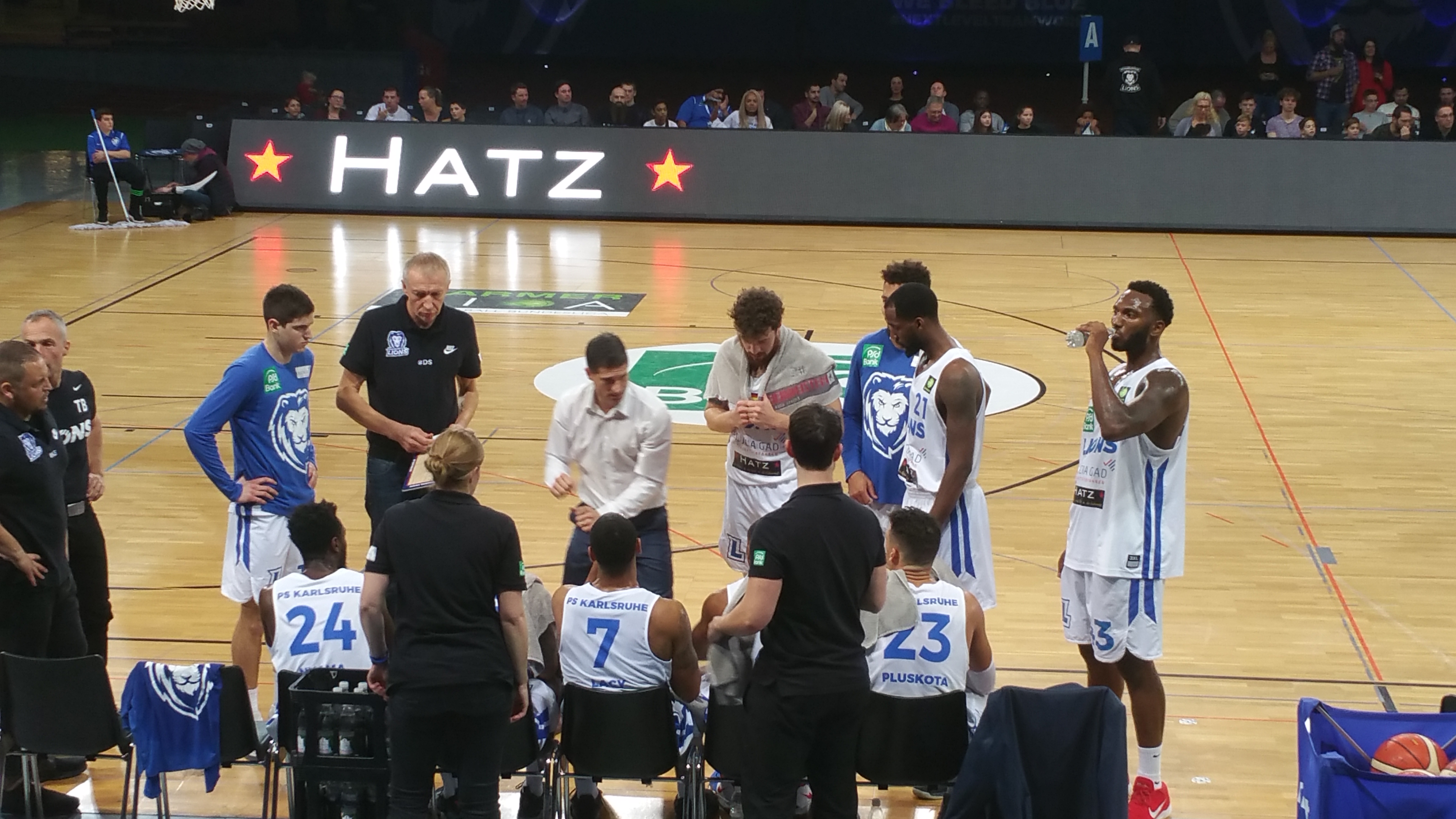
PS Karlsruhe Lions in December 2018

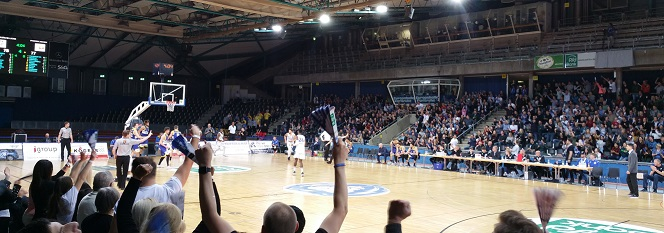
PS Karlsruhe Lions home game in December 2018

The PS Karlsruhe Lions are a German professional basketball team located in Karlsruhe. The team competes in Germany's ProA league, the country's second division. In 2017, the team promoted from the third tier ProB to the second tier. The team is part of the multi-sports club Post Südstadt Karlsruhe (PSK).

As of 2024, the team has been the reigning champion of the German ProA league.

== History ==
Basketball has been played at PSK in the southern Karlsruhe district of Weiherfeld-Dammerstock since 1961. In the following decades, the department celebrated numerous regional and national successes. In 2016, the PS Karlsruhe Lions had four men's teams and two women's teams registered for play. In addition, there were numerous youth teams from U10 to U18. Until 2016, there was a cooperation with BG Karlsruhe, which had emerged in 1993 from the basketball departments of PSK and its neighboring club, FC Südstern. Due to the promotion of the first men's team of the PS Karlsruhe Lions to the 2nd Bundesliga ProB, the cooperation was terminated in May 2016, as both teams competed in the same league in the 2016/17 season. The first Karlsruhe women's team played in the Regionalliga Südwest.

The Lions consolidated their position in the ProA after earning promotion in 2017.

In the 2018–19 season, the Lions reached the ProA playoffs for the first time, advancing to the semifinals before being eliminated by promotion contenders.

During 2020–21, the club struggled to maintain consistency and finished outside the playoff places, instead emphasizing the development of young German talent.

The 2021–22 season marked a return to form, as Karlsruhe qualified for the postseason before exiting in the quarterfinals.

In 2022–23, the Lions finished mid-table and narrowly missed the playoffs, focusing on financial stability and building partnerships for long-term growth.

On 7 April 2024, the Lions' Lachlan Dent set a ProA league record for 3-poniters made in a single game as he hit 10 in the game vs. Paderborn Baskets.

In 2024, the Lions celebrated the greatest success in their club's history by winning the ProA championship and securing promotion to the Basketball Bundesliga (BBL) for the first time. However, the club was unable to obtain a license and thus stayed in the ProA.

== Arenas ==
Until 2017, the club played in the Friedrich-List-Schule, which had a capacity of 862 people. In the 2017–18 season, following the club's promotion to the ProA, the Lions started playing in the Europahalle Karlsruhe which has a capacity of 1,500 people. In 2020, they moved to the Lina-Radke-Halle. (1,500 seats)

For the 2024-25 season, the Lions returned to the Europahalle with an anticipated capacity of 3,500 visitors.

== Honors ==
ProA

- Champions: 2023–24

== Players ==
=== Current roster ===
Note: Flags indicate national team eligibility at FIBA-sanctioned events. Players may hold other non-FIBA nationalities not displayed.

PS Karlsruhe LIONS roster
Players
Coaches

Pos.	No.	Nat.	Name	Ht.	Wt.	Age
PG	0	(Germany)	Scheu, David	1.88 m (6 ft 2 in)	89 kg (196 lb)	23 – 29 October 2003
PG	1	(Germany)	Koch, Noah	1.87 m (6 ft 2 in)	90 kg (198 lb)	19 – 22 March 2007
PG	2	(United States)	Owens, Zac	1.83 m (6 ft 0 in)	81 kg (179 lb)	27 – 22 December 1998
PG	3	(United States)	Williams, Martel	1.91 m (6 ft 3 in)	95 kg (209 lb)	25 – 7 November 2001
PG	4	(United States)	Hart, Isaiah	1.79 m (5 ft 10 in)	83 kg (183 lb)	27 – 5 July 1999
C	7	(Germany)	Oba, Wesley	2.03 m (6 ft 8 in)	99 kg (218 lb)	27 – 30 September 1999
PF	11	(Germany)	George, Jason	2.03 m (6 ft 8 in)	100 kg (220 lb)	25 – 21 May 2001
SF	12	(Germany)	Binapfl, Kilian	1.98 m (6 ft 6 in)	96 kg (212 lb)	26 – 1 January 2000
SG	16	(Germany)	Kendeš, Julijo	1.98 m (6 ft 6 in)	96 kg (212 lb)	19 – 3 December 2006
C	21	(United States)	Jones, Robert	1.98 m (6 ft 6 in)	96 kg (212 lb)	25 – 3 July 2001
PG	22	(Germany)	Koné, Bazoumana	1.98 m (6 ft 6 in)	96 kg (212 lb)	32 – 13 December 1993
C	23	(Germany)	Pluskota, Maurice	2.09 m (6 ft 10 in)	113 kg (249 lb)	34 – 30 May 1992
PF	33	(United States)	Seng, Theo	2.06 m (6 ft 9 in)	104 kg (229 lb)	24 – 12 August 2002
C	77	(Croatia)	Galić, Luka	2.13 m (7 ft 0 in)	99 kg (218 lb)	21 – 18 October 2005

Head coach

- (Germany) Demond Greene

Assistant coach(es)

- (Germany) Aleksandar Nadjfeji

Legend

- (C) Team captain
- Injured

- Roster
Updated: November 16, 2026

== Season by season ==
Season	Tier	League	Pos.	Cup
2013–14	5	2. Regionalliga	2nd	
2014–15	5	2. Regionalliga	Champion	
2015–16	4	1. Regionalliga	Champion	
2016–17	3	ProB	2nd	
2017–18	2	ProA	3rd	
2018–19	2	ProA	8th	
2019–20	2	ProA	15th	
2020–21	2	ProA	11th	
2021–22	2	ProA	7th	
2022–23	2	ProA	3rd	
2023–24	2	ProA	Champion (Note: Despite earning sportive promotion, the club was unable to obtain a license for the Basketball Bundesliga. The club therefore stayed in the ProA.)	First round
2024–25	2	ProA	11th	First round
2025–26	2	ProA	8th	

== Notable players ==
Note: Flags indicate national team eligibility at FIBA-sanctioned events. Players may hold other non-FIBA nationalities not displayed.

Criteria

To appear in this section a player must have either:

- Set a club record or won an individual award while at the club
- Played at least one official international match for their national team at any time
- Played at least one official NBA match at any time.

- (Australia) Lachlan Dent
- (Canada) Abu Kigab
- (Cameroon) Roland Nyama
- (Croatia) Darko Bajo
- (Croatia) Ivan Karačić
- (Czech Republic) Adam Pechacek
- (Denmark) Bakary Dibba
- (Democratic Republic of the Congo) Carl Ona-Embo
- (Ivory Coast) Bazoumana Koné
- (United States) Victor Bailey
- (United States) Lovell Cabbil
- (United States) Greg Foster
- (United States) Justin Gordon
- (United States) Richard Williams

== Head coaches ==
- (United States) Michael Mai (2017–2018)
- (Croatia) Ivan Rudež (2018–2020)
- (Germany) (Croatia) Drazan Salavarda (2020–2021)
- (Croatia) Aleksandar Scepanovic (2021–2025) (ProA winner 2024)
- (Germany) Demond Greene (2025–present)
