= Bazoumana Koné =

Ivorian–German basketball player

No. 22 – PS Karlsruhe Lions
- Position: Point guard / shooting guard
- League: ProA

Personal information
- Born: 13 December 1993 (age 32) Hamburg‑Langenhorn, Germany
- Listed height: 1.93 m (6 ft 4 in)
- Listed weight: 85 kg (187 lb)

Career information
- Playing career: 2012–present

Career history
- 2012–2014: Eisbären Bremerhaven
- 2014–2016: Hamburg Towers
- 2016–2017: Riesen Ludwigsburg
- 2017–2019: Löwen Braunschweig
- 2019–2020: Oklahoma City Blue
- 2020–2021: Löwen Braunschweig
- 2021–2022: Liège Basket
- 2022: Reale Mutua Torino
- 2022–2023: Karlsruhe Lions
- 2023–2025: Würzburg Baskets
- 2026–present: Karlsruhe Lions

Career highlights
- ProA Impact Player of the Game – Nov 2022, Feb 2023

Bazoumana Koné (born 13 December 1993) is an Ivorian-German professional basketball player for the Karlsruhe Lions of the German ProA. He plays as a combo guard and represents the Ivory Coast national team internationally.

== Professional career ==
Koné debuted in the BBL with Eisbären Bremerhaven (2012–2014), before joining Hamburg Towers (2014–2016), and later the Basketball Löwen Braunschweig (2017–2019). In autumn 2019, he was drafted by the Oklahoma City Blue and played three games before an injury ended his stint.

He returned to Europe in 2021 with Liège Basket (Belgium) and moved in March 2022 to Italy's Reale Mutua Torino, averaging 5.8 points per game.

In September 2022, Koné signed with PS Karlsruhe Lions. He earned ProA “Impact Player of the Game” twice: on 22 November 2022 (25 pts, 6 ast, 4 reb, 3 stl) and on 19 February 2023 (30 pts, 8 ast, 3 reb, 2 stl), helping the Lions to the ProA semifinals while averaging 15.2 ppg.

On 24 June 2025, Koné signed a one-year deal with Mitteldeutscher BC, becoming the club's fifth summer addition under head coach Marco Ramondino. On October 10, 2025, SYNTAINICS MBC and point guard Bazoumana Koné mutually agreed to terminate his contract due to differing views on future cooperation after injuries limited him to two preseason appearances.

On October 9, 2026, he signed with Karlsruhe Lions of the German ProA.

== International career ==
Koné participated in the 2023 FIBA Basketball World Cup with the Ivory Coast, averaging 8.3 points, 1.5 rebounds, and 2.5 assists per game.
