= Maurice Pluskota =

German basketball player (born 1992)

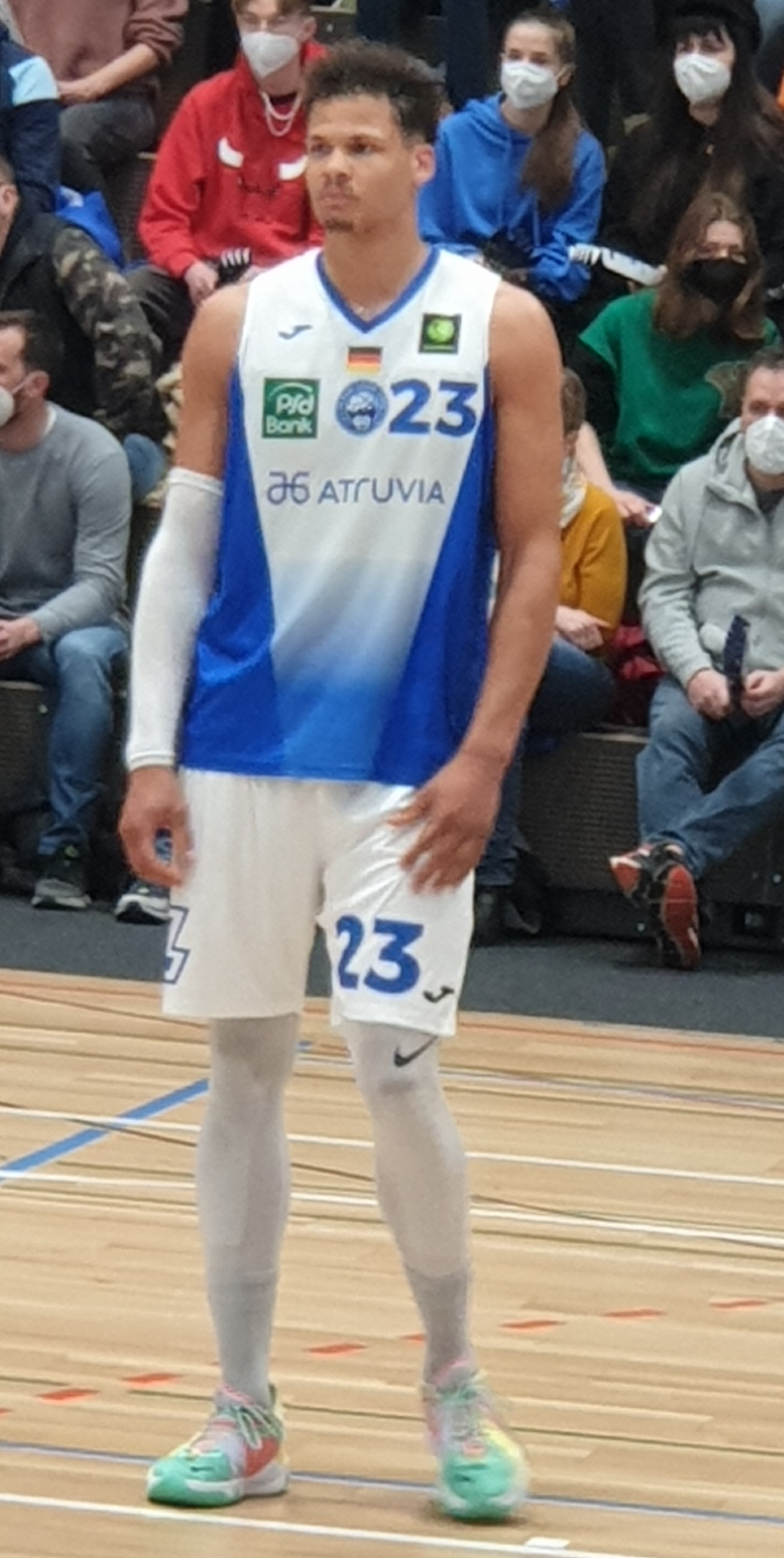
- Pluskota with Karlsruhe in March 2022

No. 23 – PS Karlsruhe Lions
- Position: Center
- League: ProA

Personal information
- Born: 30 May 1992 (age 34) Bremerhaven, Germany
- Listed height: 2.09 m (6 ft 10 in)
- Listed weight: 226 lb (103 kg)

Career information
- Playing career: 2009–present

Career history
- 2009–2013: Eisbären Bremerhaven
- 2011–2013: →Cuxhaven BasCats
- 2013–2015: Löwen Braunschweig
- 2013–2015: →SG Braunschweig
- 2015–2017: Gießen 46ers
- 2017–present: PS Karlsruhe Lions

Maurice Marko Pluskota (born 30 May 1992) is a German basketball player who plays for the PS Karlsruhe Lions of the German ProA. He plays the center position.

== Early career ==
Pluskota began playing basketball in the youth system of Eisbären Bremerhaven. He made his professional debut during the 2010–11 season in the Basketball Bundesliga, Germany’s top-tier league. At the same time, he also played in the second-tier ProA for Cuxhaven BasCats via a dual license agreement.

== Löwen Braunschweig (2013–2015) ==
In 2013, Pluskota transferred to Basketball Löwen Braunschweig, competing again in the Bundesliga. During this time, he also played in the third-tier ProB with the affiliated club SG Braunschweig.

== PS Karlsruhe Lions (2017–2023) ==
In August 2017, Pluskota signed with the PS Karlsruhe Lions in the ProA league. In his first season (2017–18), he averaged 13.3 points and 6.6 rebounds per game, helping Karlsruhe reach the ProA playoff semifinals.

In February 2019, he was sidelined for the remainder of the season after undergoing surgery on his shin.

In the 2019–20 season, which was cut short due to the COVID-19 pandemic, he led the team with 13.5 points and 7.9 rebounds per game.

His strongest statistical season came in 2022–23, when he averaged 15.8 points and 10.5 rebounds per game, again helping the team to the playoff semifinals.

== EPG Baskets Koblenz and return to Karlsruhe (2023–present) ==
In July 2023, Pluskota signed with the newly promoted EPG Baskets Koblenz to continue in the ProA. However, on 27 October 2024, the club announced that Pluskota had requested a contract termination for family reasons, and the request was granted effective 31 October 2024.

Shortly after, he returned to the PS Karlsruhe Lions and resumed his role as team leader. On 15 February 2025, Pluskota recorded 29 points and 13 rebounds in his 188th appearance for Karlsruhe.

== Playing style ==
Pluskota is recognized as a physical presence in the paint, known for his rebounding instincts and interior scoring. He has been a consistent double-double threat in the ProA and is valued for his leadership as team captain in Karlsruhe.

== Personal life ==
In 2024, Pluskota became a father. This development influenced his decision to leave Koblenz mid-season and return to Karlsruhe to be closer to his family.
