= KK Solin =

- Leagues: A-2 Liga
- Founded: 1969; 56 years ago
- Arena: Solin City Sports Hall
- Location: Solin, Croatia

KK Solin is a basketball club based in Solin, Croatia. The club currently competes in the A-2 Liga, the second tier in Croatian basketball. From 1990 to 2002, Solin was co-operating with KK Split.

== Players ==
=== Notable players ===
Note: Flags indicate national team eligibility at FIBA-sanctioned events. Players may hold other non-FIBA nationalities not displayed.

Criteria

To appear in this section a player must have either:

- Set a club record or won an individual award while at the club
- Played at least one official international match for their national team at any time
- Played at least one official NBA match at any time.

Croatia

- Damir Rančić
- Drago Pašalić
- Hrvoje Perić
