= Mece, Croatia =

Mece
- Village (Selo)
- Location within Osijek-Baranja County Location within Croatia Location within Europe
- Coordinates: 45.623°N 18.713°E
- Country: Croatia
- Region: Baranya (Podunavlje)
- County: Osijek-Baranja County
- Municipality: Darda

Area
  - Total: 5.1 km^{2} (2.0 sq mi)

Population (2021)
  - Total: 763
  - Density: 150/km^{2} (390/sq mi)
- Time zone: UTC+1 (CET)
  - Summer (DST): UTC+2 (CEST)

Mece (Hungarian: Mеcepuszta; Serbian Cyrillic: Меце) is a settlement in the region of Baranja, Croatia. Administratively, it is located in the Darda municipality within the Osijek-Baranja County. Population is 882 people.

== See also ==
- Osijek-Baranja County
- Baranja
