= KK Kaštela =

KK Ribola Kaštela
- Leagues: Prva liga
- Founded: 2001
- History: 2001–present
- Arena: Školska sportska dvorana Kaštel Sućurac
- Location: Kaštel Sućurac, Kaštela, Croatia
- Team colors: Yellow and Black
- Head coach: Damir Rančić
- Website: kk-kastela.hr
Home	Away

Košarkaški klub Kaštela (for sponsorship reasons also known as Ribola Kaštela) is a professional basketball club based in Kaštela, Croatia. It competes in the Prva liga.

== Notable players ==
- (Croatia) Dragan Bender
- (Croatia) Ante Žižić

== Notable coaches ==
- (Croatia) Stipe Bralić
- (Croatia) Damir Rančić
