= KK Belišće =

- Leagues: A-2 Liga
- Founded: 1974
- History: 1974 - Present
- Arena: Dvorana osnovne škole Belišće (capacity: 1,000)
- Location: Belišće, Croatia
- Team colors: Red and White
- President: Zoran Uranjek
- Head coach: Antun Katalenić
- Website: kkbelisce.hr
Home	Away

Košarkaški klub Belišće is a Croatian professional basketball club based in a town of Belišće. The club was founded on March 13, 1974 by Stjepan Pedrov.
