= Goran Vrbanc =

Croatian professional basketball player (born 1984)

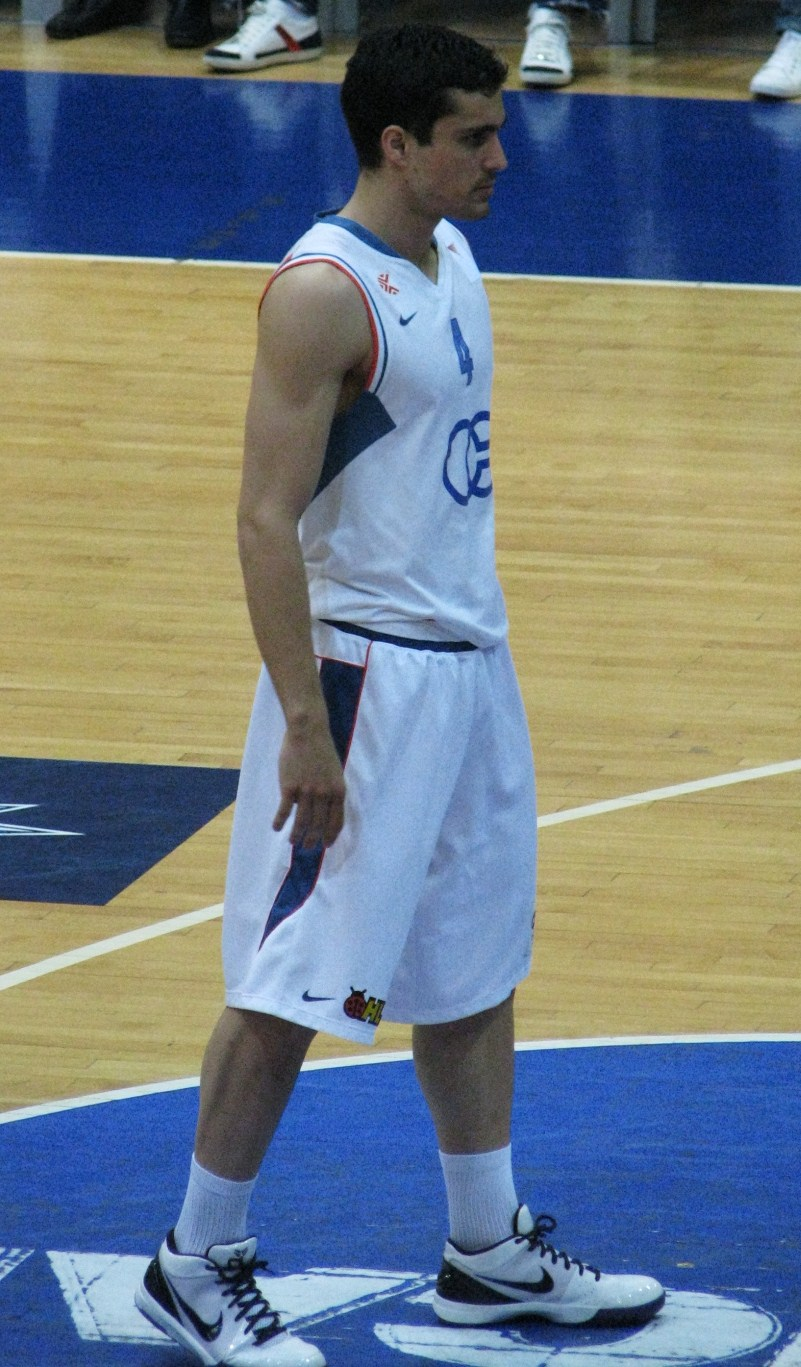
- in 2010

Free agent
- Position: Shooting guard

Personal information
- Born: October 8, 1984 (age 42) Rijeka, SR Croatia, SFR Yugoslavia
- Listed height: 6 ft 4 in (1.93 m)
- Listed weight: 205 lb (93 kg)

Career information
- NBA draft: 2006: undrafted
- Playing career: 2003–present

Career history
- 2003–2006: Kvarner
- 2006–2009: Cibona
- 2009: Široki Eronet
- 2009–2011: Cibona
- 2011–2013: Zadar
- 2013–2014: Lietkabelis
- 2014–2015: AZS Koszalin
- 2015–2016: Zagreb
- 2016: Szolnoki Olaj
- 2016: Sigal Prishtina
- 2016: Karpoš Sokoli
- 2017: Apollon Patras

Career highlights
- 2x A-1 Liga champion (2007), (2010); Croatian Cup winner (2009); 2x Croatian All-star (2005), (2006)

Goran Vrbanc (born October 8, 1984) is a Croatian professional basketball player who last played for Apollon Patras of the Greek A2 League.

== Career ==
Vrbanc debuted with the Croatian basketball club KK Rijeka in 2003. In 2006, he moved to Croatian powerhouse Cibona Zagreb, then to the Bosnian Široki Eronet, and finally back to Croatian KK Cibona and KK Zadar. He played three seasons in the Euroleague with Cibona, averaging a high of 6.3 points per game during his debut season with the club. In January 2014, he signed with BC Lietkabelis.

On 27 October 2016, he signed for Karpoš Sokoli.

On 17 July 2017, he signed for Apollon Patras of the Greek A2 League.
