= KK Trogir =

- Leagues: A-2 Liga - South
- Founded: 1984
- History: 1984 - Present
- Arena: SD Vinko Kandija
- Location: Trogir, Croatia
- Team colors: Blue and White
- President: Ante Piteša
- Head coach: Ante Perica
- Website: kktrogir.hr
| Home | Away |

Košarkaški klub Trogir (English: Trogir Basketball Club) is a professional basketball club based in Trogir, Croatia. It competes in the A-2 Liga - South.
