= KK Križevci =

- Nickname: Žapci ("Frogs")
- Leagues: A-1 Liga
- Founded: 2008
- History: 2008 - 2015
- Arena: ŠŠD OŠ Ljudevita Modeca (capacity: 1,600)
- Location: Križevci, Croatia
- Team colors: Yellow and Blue
- President: Goran Delić
- Website: kk-krizevci.hr
Home	Away

Košarkaški klub Križevci (English: Križevci Basketball Club), also known as KK Prigorje Financije for sponsorship reasons, is a professional basketball club based in Križevci, Croatia. It competes in the Croatian League.

== History ==
The club was founded in 2008 by a group of basketball enthusiast unsatisfied with functioning of KK Radnik Križevci, basketball club that was once one of the best in Croatia. So they decided to form their own club and in only three seasons they have managed to qualify for Croatian first league.
