= Športska dvorana Gospino polje =

Multi-purpose indoor sports arena in Dubrovnik, Croatia

Gospino polje Sports Hall
- Športska dvorana Gospino polje
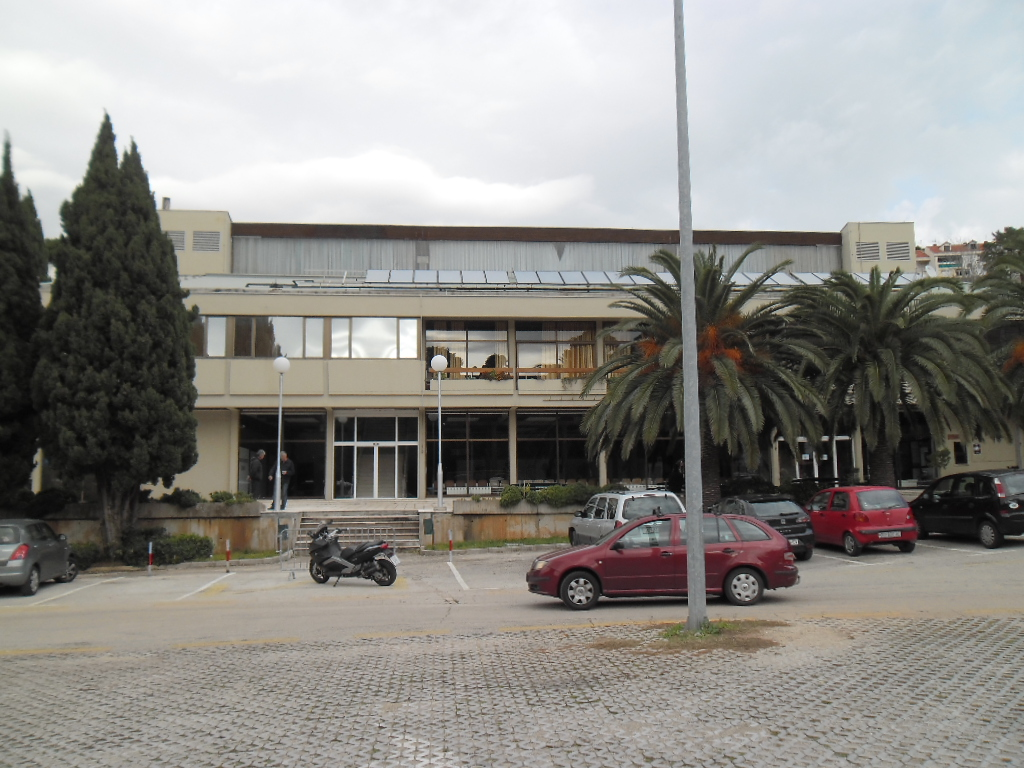
- Interactive map of Gospino polje Sports Hall
- Location: Dubrovnik, Croatia
- Coordinates: 42°38′49.1″N 18°05′16.8″E
- Capacity: 1,400

Construction
- Opened: 1981

Športska dvorana Gospino polje (English: Gospino polje Sports Hall, lit. 'Sports Hall of Our Lady's field') is a multi-purpose indoor sports arena located in Dubrovnik, Croatia.

The arena hosts basketball, including occasional Croatian national team matches and basketball club KK Dubrovnik. It has also hosted international futsal qualifiers.
