= KK Dubrovnik =

Croatian basketball team

- Nickname: Gospari ("The Aristocracy")
- Leagues: Favbet Premijer Liga
- Founded: 1946
- Arena: SD Gospino Polje (capacity: 2,500)
- Location: Dubrovnik, Croatia
- Team colors: White and Red
- President: Marko
- Head coach: Brzica
- 2023-24 position: 7th (15-18)
- Website: kkdubrovnik.hr
Home	Away

Košarkaški klub Dubrovnik (English: Dubrovnik Basketball Club) is a professional basketball club based in Dubrovnik, Croatia. It competes in the top-level Croatian league, the Premijer Liga.

== History ==
The club was founded in 1946 and played all most of its history in lower Yugoslavian and then Croatian leagues. In 2004, the club finally managed to qualify for the first league and they have been playing there ever since.

== Trophies ==
- Croatian A2 League (second tier): 2; 1994-95 (South division), 1997-98

== Notable players ==
- (Croatia) Lukša Andrić
- (Croatia) Adnan Bečić
- (Croatia) Denis Bajramović
- (Croatia) Andro Knego
- (Croatia) Nikola Prkačin
- (Croatia) Hrvoje Perić
- (Croatia) Aleksandar Šćepanović
- (Croatia) Ante Tomić
- (Croatia) Mario Hezonja
