= KK Slavonski Brod =

KK Brod
- Leagues: A-1 Liga
- Founded: 1946
- History: 1946 - 2014
- Arena: Sportska dvorana Vijuš (capacity: 2,200)
- Location: Slavonski Brod, Croatia
- Team colors: Black and White
Home	Away

Košarkaški klub Slavonski Brod (English: Slavonski Brod Basketball Club) is a professional basketball club based in Slavonski Brod, Croatia. It competed in the Croatian League. For many years the club was known as Oriolik, Svjetlost Brod, Brod-Svjetlost and KK Đuro Đaković due to sponsorship reasons.

In December 2014, Slavonski Brod withdrew from Croatian League due to financial troubles.
