= Darda, Croatia =

Darda
- Municipality
- Municipality of Darda; Općina Darda
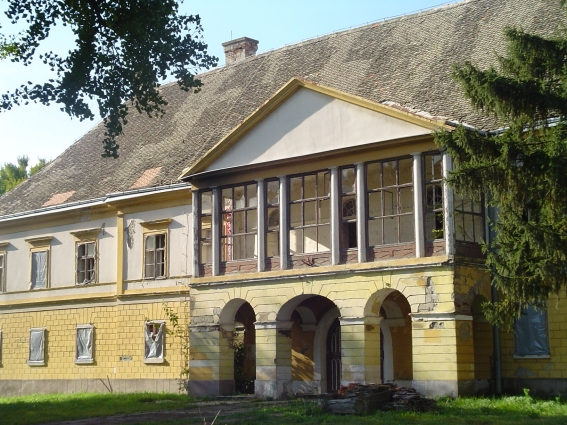

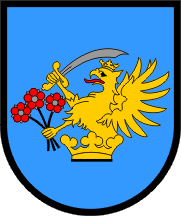
- Coat of arms

- Location of Darda in Croatia Darda (Croatia) Darda (Europe)
- Coordinates: 45°37′40″N 18°41′37″E
- Country: Croatia
- Region: Baranja (Podunavlje)
- County: Osijek-Baranja County

Government
  - Mayor: Anto Vukoje

Area
  - Municipality: 94.1 km^{2} (36.3 sq mi)
  - Urban: 82.6 km^{2} (31.9 sq mi)

Population (2021)
  - Municipality: 5,427
  - Density: 57.7/km^{2} (149/sq mi)
  - Urban: 4,151
  - Urban density: 50.3/km^{2} (130/sq mi)
- Time zone: UTC+1 (CET)
- Website: darda.hr

Darda (Serbian Cyrillic: Дарда, Hungarian: Dárda) is a village and a municipality just north of Osijek, Croatia. It is located across the Drava river in Baranja. At the 2011 census, the village population was 5,323, with a total of 6,908 people in the municipality. The castle of the Hungarian Esterhazy family is located in the center of the Darda.

== Name ==
In Hungarian the town is known as Dárda, in German as Lanzenau, and in Serbian Cyrillic as Дарда. In Hungarian, a dárda (spear, lance) is made by ramming a dagger (tőr) into a long handle or pole. It was a military weapon used by the cavaliers and the infantry in the old times. Darda was first mentioned in Roman times under the name Tarda.

== History ==
It was first mentioned in 1280 as "Turda", later in 1282 as "Tharda", "Thorda", in 1290, 1299 as "Thorda", in 1332–1335 as "Turida", "Torda", later as (Kis-) és (Nagy-) Dárda, Dárda. During the Hungarian administration (13th-16th century), the area was part of the Baranya county. In the 16th-17th century, area was part of the Ottoman Empire and administratively belonged to the Sanjak of Mohaç. Ottoman traveler Evliya Çelebi in 1663 described Darda as an important market place with a strong fortress with towers. According to Çelebi, fortified part of the settlement had 50 houses and one mosque, while part of the settlement outside of the walls had one han and ten shops.

Since the end of the 17th century, the area was part of the Habsburg monarchy and administratively belonged to the Baranya county, which was part of the Habsburg Kingdom of Hungary. Darda was administratively included into the municipality of Baranyavár (Branjin Vrh) and in 1850 offices of local administration of this municipality were moved to Darda. In the end of the 18th century, Darda was a multi-ethnic settlement, mainly populated by Croats and Germans. In 1910, population included Germans, Croats and Hungarians.

Since 1918, Darda part of the Kingdom of Serbs, Croats and Slovenes (later renamed to Yugoslavia). From 1918 to 1922, it was part of the Novi Sad county, from 1922 to 1929 part of the Bačka Oblast, and from 1929 to 1941 part of the Danube Banovina. In 1941 it was occupied and re-annexed by Hungary and was administratively re-included into Baranya county. It was returned to Yugoslav control in 1944 and was administratively part of Vojvodina until 1945, when it was transferred to the People's Republic of Croatia.

Until the end of World War II, the inhabitants were Danube Swabians, also called locally as Stifolder, because their ancestors arrived in the 17th century and 18th century from Fulda (district). Most of the former German settlers were expelled to Allied-occupied Germany and Allied-occupied Austria in 1945–1948, as a result of the Potsdam Agreement.

During the Croatian War of Independence (1991–1995), Darda was incorporated into the unrecognized breakaway Republic of Serbian Krajina. It was returned to Croatian control after the war, following the short period of UN administration (1996–1998).

Darda is underdeveloped municipality which is statistically classified as the First Category Area of Special State Concern by the Government of Croatia.

== Population ==
The municipality of Darda includes following settlements:

- Darda, population: 5,323
- Mece, population: 882
- Švajcarnica, population: 196
- Uglješ, population: 507

Largest ethnic groups in the municipality are (census 2011):

- Croats (55.7%)
- Serbs (23.2%)
- Romani (9.41%)
- Hungarians (6.98%)

== Politics ==
=== Minority councils ===
Directly elected minority councils and representatives are tasked with consulting the local or regional authorities, advocating for minority rights and interests, integration into public life and participation in the management of local affairs. At the 2023 Croatian national minorities councils and representatives elections Hungarians, Roma and Serbs of Croatia each fulfilled legal requirements to elect 10 members municipal minority councils of the Darda Municipality.

== See also ==
- Church of the Saint Archangel Michael, Darda
- Osijek-Baranja County
- Baranja

== Sources ==
- Siniša Đuričić (2023). Сведоци времена: историјски преглед развоја насеља Дарда [Witnesees of Time: Historical Review of the Development of the Darda Settlement] (in Serbian (Cyrillic script)). Vukovar: Joint Council of Municipalities. ISBN 978-953-8489-07-5.
