= 2011 FIBA Europe Under-16 Championship =

2011 EuroBasket Under-16
25th FIBA Europe Under-16 Championship

Tournament details
- Host country: Czech Republic
- Dates: July 28 – August 7, 2011
- Teams: 16
- Venue(s): 3 (in 2 host cities)

Final positions
- Champions: Croatia (3rd title)

Tournament statistics
- MVP: (Croatia) Mario Hezonja
- Top scorer: (Bulgaria) Vezenkov (27.1)
- Top rebounds: (Czech Republic) Peterka (12.6)
- Top assists: (Czech Republic) Kouril (6.1)
- PPG (Team): Serbia (84.4)
- RPG (Team): Croatia (46.1)
- APG (Team): Lithuania (20.6)

Official website
- Official web (archive)

The 2011 FIBA Europe Under-16 Championship was the 25th edition of the FIBA Europe Under-16 Championship. 16 teams featured in the competition, which was held in the Czech Republic, from July 28 to August 7. Croatia won the title for the third time, and the second in a row.

== Teams ==
- Bulgaria
- Croatia
- Czech Republic
- France
- Germany
- Greece
- Italy
- Latvia
- Lithuania
- Montenegro
- Poland
- Russia
- Serbia
- Spain
- Turkey
- Ukraine

== Group stages ==
=== Preliminary round ===
In this round, the sixteen teams are allocated in four groups of four teams each. The top three advanced to the qualifying round. The last team of each group played for the 13th–16th place in the Classification Games.

Team advance to Qualifying Round
Team compete in Classification Round

Times given below are in CEST (UTC+2).

==== Group A ====
Team	Pld	W	L	PF	PA	PD	Pts	Tiebreaker
Czech Republic	3	3	0	233	197	+36	6	
Spain	3	2	1	207	163	+44	5	
Greece	3	1	2	175	208	−33	4	
Poland	3	0	3	180	227	−47	3	

28 July 2011
18:00

Report

Poland	59–73	Greece
Scoring by quarter: 19–16, 13–17, 16–18, 11–22
Pts: Socha, Witlinski 12; Rebs: Jeszke 9 Asts: Brenk 3		Pts: Stamatis 13; Rebs: Kefalas 6 Asts: Liapis 4

Hala Dukla, Pardubice
Attendance: 400
Referees: Alexandru Olaru (ROU), Milan Adamovic (BIH), Aytug Ekti (TUR)

28 July 2011
18:00

Report

Czech Republic	70–67	Spain
Scoring by quarter: 26–20, 21–18, 11–22, 12–7
Pts: Kouril 24; Rebs: Peterka 16; Asts: Kouril 7		Pts: Sans 24; Rebs: Diop 13; Asts: Martin 5

Hala Dukla, Pardubice
Attendance: 1,000
Referees: Luigi Lamonica (ITA), Antonis Demetriou (CYP), Jesed Diaz Bloncourt (PUR)

29 July 2011
15:45

Report

Spain	76–47	Poland
Scoring by quarter: 24–10, 11–16, 18–13, 23–8
Pts: Martin 16; Rebs: Diop 11; Asts: Martin 8		Pts: Witlinski 12; Rebs: Jeszke, Michalik 6 Asts: Walczak 3

Sports Hall Trebes, Hradec Králové
Attendance: 350
Referees: Tomislav Vovk (CRO), Sergiy Zashchuk (UKR), Vladimir Tsekov (BUL)

29 July 2011
18:00

Report

Greece	56–85	Czech Republic
Scoring by quarter: 22–27, 9–16, 11–21, 14–21
Pts: Liapis 12; Rebs: Diamantakos 7 Asts: Charalampopoulos 3		Pts: Kouril 22; Rebs: Peterka 7 Asts: Kouril 7

Sports Hall Trebes, Hradec Králové
Attendance: 900
Referees: Boris Schmidt (GER), Uros Obrknezevic (SRB), Sigmundur Herbertsson (ISL)

30 July 2011
13:30

Report

Spain	64–46	Greece
Scoring by quarter: 11–15, 14–6, 18–16, 21–9
Pts: Sans, Diop 12; Rebs: Martin 9 Asts: Martin 6		Pts: Diamantakos 15; Rebs: Liapis 7 Asts: Charalampopoulos 4

Hala Dukla, Pardubice
Attendance: 200
Referees: Boris Schmidt (GER), Sergiy Zashchuk (UKR), Uros Obrknezevic (SRB)

30 July 2011
20:15

Report

Poland	74–78	Czech Republic
Scoring by quarter: 19–21, 16–17, 25–17, 14–23
Pts: Jeszke 17; Rebs: Jeszke 9 Asts: Zywert 5		Pts: Kouril, Dedek 12; Rebs: Kouril 13; Asts: Kouril 5

Hala Dukla, Pardubice
Attendance: 1,000
Referees: Tomislav Vovk (CRO), Vladan Sundic (MNE), Milan Adamovic (BIH)

==== Group B ====
Team	Pld	W	L	PF	PA	PD	Pts	Tiebreaker
Germany	3	3	0	216	189	+27	6	
Russia	3	2	1	249	239	+10	5	
Serbia	3	1	2	251	227	+24	4	
Montenegro	3	0	3	201	262	−61	3	

28 July 2011
15:45

Report

Russia	67–71	Germany
Scoring by quarter: 14–18, 19–19, 21–15, 13–19
Pts: Martynov 17; Rebs: Sizov, Zhulkov 8 Asts: Fedorchenko 2		Pts: Akpinar 20; Rebs: Ygrai, Wimberg 8 Asts: Taylor 4

Hala Dukla, Pardubice
Referees: Saverio Lanzarini (ITA), Vladimir Tsekov (BUL), Sigmundur Herbertsson (ISL)

28 July 2011
13:30

Report

Montenegro	62–100	Serbia
Scoring by quarter: 16–26, 13–25, 14–31, 19–18
Pts: Savić 18; Rebs: Savić 5 Asts: Djurovic 4		Pts: Djukanovic 20; Rebs: Ristić 13; Asts: Rebić 6

Hala Dukla, Pardubice
Attendance: 100
Referees: Carlos Cortes (ESP), Joseph Bissang (FRA), Petr Hrusa (CZE)

29 July 2011
13:30

Report

Serbia	83–91	Russia
Scoring by quarter: 24–13, 20–27, 19–23, 20–28
Pts: Rebić 26; Rebs: Kaplanović, Ristić 6 Asts: Rebić 5		Pts: Fedorchenko 33; Rebs: Sizov 8 Asts: Khrustalev, Klyundikov 3

Sports Hall Trebes, Hradec Králové
Attendance: 200
Referees: Ioannis Foufis (GRE), Jesed Diaz Bloncourt (PUR), Athanasios Ikonomou (SWE)

29 July 2011
20:15

Report

Germany	71–54	Montenegro
Scoring by quarter: 23–12, 19–16, 9–14, 20–12
Pts: Ney 14; Rebs: Wimberg 6 Asts: Taylor 5		Pts: Djurovic 29; Rebs: Savić 10; Asts: Saric, Pavicevic 3

Sports Hall Trebes, Hradec Králové
Attendance: 189
Referees: Jurgis Laurinavicius (LTU), Antonis Demetriou (CYP), Alakbar Hasanov (AZE)

30 July 2011
15:45

Report

Russia	91–85	Montenegro
Scoring by quarter: 29–27, 26–16, 21–32, 15–10
Pts: Fedorchenko 31; Rebs: Sizov 8 Asts: Fedorchenko 3		Pts: Latković 21; Rebs: Savić 8 Asts: Savić 4

Hala Dukla, Pardubice
Attendance: 350
Referees: Jurgis Laurinavicius (LTU), Sigmundur Herbertsson (ISL), Athanasios Ikonomou (SWE)

30 July 2011
20:15

Report

Serbia	68–74	Germany
Scoring by quarter: 13–19, 21–11, 9–18, 25–26
Pts: Guduric 21; Rebs: Ristić 9 Asts: Rebić 6		Pts: Akpinar 20; Rebs: Akpinar 7 Asts: Taylor 4

Hala Dukla, Pardubice
Attendance: 125
Referees: Tomasz Trawicki (POL), Vladimir Tsekov (BUL), Saverio Lanzarini (ITA)

==== Group C ====
Team	Pld	W	L	PF	PA	PD	Pts	Tiebreaker
France	3	2	1	191	170	+21	5	1–0
Latvia	3	2	1	207	206	+1	5	0–1
Ukraine	3	1	2	197	217	−20	4	1–0
Lithuania	3	1	2	216	218	−2	4	0–1

28 July 2011
18:00

Report

France	71–56	Ukraine
Scoring by quarter: 12–17, 26–8, 16–19, 17–12
Pts: Inglis 18; Rebs: Inglis 9 Asts: Inglis 5		Pts: Boyarkin 19; Rebs: Berezhnyy 10; Asts: Boyarkin 4

Sports Hall Trebes, Hradec Králové
Attendance: 250
Referees: Tomasz Trawicki (POL), Tomislav Vovk (CRO), Alakbar Hasanov (AZE)

28 July 2011
20:15

Report

Latvia	83–80	Lithuania
Scoring by quarter: 19–27, 24–17, 13–19, 27–17
Pts: Smits 23; Rebs: Zvigurs, Smits 7 Asts: Plavnieks 4		Pts: Seskus 20; Rebs: Seskus 12; Asts: Kavaliauskas 4

Sports Hall Trebes, Hradec Králové
Attendance: 348
Referees: Boris Schmidt (GER), Uros Obrknezevic (SRB), Vladan Sundic (MNE)

29 July 2011
18:00

Report

Lithuania	61–55	France
Scoring by quarter: 19–19, 13–15, 13–18, 16–13
Pts: Serkevičius 18; Rebs: Razukas 9 Asts: Verbickas 3		Pts: Inglis 18; Rebs: Inglis 10; Asts: Pontens 2

Hala Dukla, Pardubice
Attendance: 100
Referees: Luigi Lamonica (ITA), Saverio Lanzarini (ITA), Petr Hrusa (CZE)

29 July 2011
20:15

Report

Ukraine	61–71	Latvia
Scoring by quarter: 16–22, 25–20, 11–13, 9–16
Pts: Prokopenko 21; Rebs: Prokopenko 13; Asts: Boyarkin, Kudrya 3		Pts: Geks 14; Rebs: Geks 8 Asts: Plavnieks 7

Hala Dukla, Pardubice
Attendance: 150
Referees: Carlos Cortes (ESP), Aytug Ekti (TUR), Evgeny Vetrov (RUS)

30 July 2011
15:45

Report

France	65–53	Latvia
Scoring by quarter: 16–8, 16–6, 12–16, 21–23
Pts: Rigot 17; Rebs: Rigot 11; Asts: Duwiquet 5		Pts: Smits 13; Rebs: Zvigurs 5 Asts: Plavnieks, Rozins 2

Sports Hall Trebes, Hradec Králové
Attendance: 100
Referees: Luigi Lamonica (ITA), Aytug Ekti (TUR), Evgeny Vetrov (RUS)

30 July 2011
18:00

Report

Lithuania	75–80	Ukraine
Scoring by quarter: 14–31, 23–15, 23–17, 15–17
Pts: Seskus 23; Rebs: Seskus 12; Asts: Verbickas 6		Pts: Kudrya 18; Rebs: Berezhnyy 7 Asts: Boyarkin 12

Sports Hall Trebes, Hradec Králové
Attendance: 125
Referees: Ioannis Foufis (GRE), Antonis Demetriou (CYP), Alakbar Hasanov (AZE)

==== Group D ====
Team	Pld	W	L	PF	PA	PD	Pts	Tiebreaker
Croatia	3	3	0	275	247	+28	6	
Turkey	3	2	1	234	218	+16	5	
Italy	3	1	2	216	222	−6	4	
Bulgaria	3	0	3	229	267	−38	3	

28 July 2011
13:30

Report

Turkey	85–75	Bulgaria
Scoring by quarter: 25–15, 20–17, 20–25, 20–18
Pts: Birsen 17; Rebs: Birsen 11; Asts: Kruszynski 5		Pts: Vezenkov 29; Rebs: Vezenkov, Stoimenov 7 Asts: Vezenkov, Stoimenov 4

Sports Hall Trebes, Hradec Králové
Attendance: 100
Referees: Jurgis Laurinavicius (LTU), Sergiy Zashchuk (UKR), Evgeny Vetrov (RUS)

28 July 2011
15:45

Report

Italy	80–86	Croatia
Scoring by quarter: 15–26, 18–25, 24–16, 23–19
Pts: Maccaferri 23; Rebs: Di Prampero 5 Asts: Maccaferri 4		Pts: Marinelli 20; Rebs: K. Žganec 12; Asts: Hezonja 8

Sports Hall Trebes, Hradec Králové
Attendance: 150
Referees: Ioannis Foufis (GRE), Athanasios Ikonomou (SWE), Martins Briedis (LAT)

29 July 2011
13:30

Report

Croatia	91–85	Turkey
Scoring by quarter: 24–21, 23–20, 19–22, 25–22
Pts: Hezonja 24; Rebs: Gabrić 12; Asts: Bošnjak 4		Pts: Osman 33; Rebs: Ulubay 7 Asts: Özmizrak 5

Hala Dukla, Pardubice
Attendance: 150
Referees: Joseph Bissang (FRA), Alexandru Olaru (ROU), Martins Briedis (LAT)

29 July 2011
15:45

Report

Bulgaria	72–84	Italy
Scoring by quarter: 19–16, 21–25, 19–15, 13–28
Pts: Vezenkov 21; Rebs: Vezenkov 13; Asts: Vezenkov, Mihaylov 4		Pts: Di Prampero 26; Rebs: Benvenuti 12; Asts: Maccaferri 5

Hala Dukla, Pardubice
Attendance: 150
Referees: Tomasz Trawicki (POL), Vladan Sundic (MNE), Milan Adamovic (BIH)

30 July 2011
13:30

Report

Croatia	98–82	Bulgaria
Scoring by quarter: 29–10, 25–19, 26–22, 18–31
Pts: Hezonja 14; Rebs: K. Žganec 14; Asts: K. Žganec 6		Pts: Vezenkov 27; Rebs: Vezenkov 5 Asts: Stoimenov 6

Sports Hall Trebes, Hradec Králové
Attendance: 150
Referees: Joseph Bissang (FRA), Alexandru Olaru (ROU), Petr Hrusa (CZE)

30 July 2011
20:15

Report

Turkey	64–52	Italy
Scoring by quarter: 18–8, 15–11, 15–25, 16–8
Pts: Birsen 16; Rebs: Birsen 11; Asts: Özmizrak 8		Pts: Fontecchio 16; Rebs: Fontecchio 10; Asts: Maccaferri 5

Sports Hall Trebes, Hradec Králové
Attendance: 150
Referees: Jesed Diaz Bloncourt (PUR), Carlos Cortes (ESP), Martins Briedis (LAT)

=== Qualifying round ===
The twelve teams remaining were allocated in two groups of six teams each. The four top teams advanced to the quarterfinals. The last two teams of each group played for the 9th–12th place.

Team advance to Quarterfinals
Team compete in 9th–12th playoffs

==== Group E ====
Team	Pld	W	L	PF	PA	PD	Pts	Tiebreaker
Czech Republic	5	4	1	388	358	+30	9	1–0
Spain	5	4	1	334	277	+57	9	0–1
Germany	5	3	2	314	316	−2	8	
Russia	5	2	3	361	379	−18	7	1–0
Serbia	5	2	3	393	388	+5	7	0–1
Greece	5	0	5	295	367	−72	5	

1 August 2011
15:45

Report

Russia	47–75	Spain
Scoring by quarter: 9–19, 12–22, 8–16, 18–18
Pts: Sizov 16; Rebs: Gankevich 7 Asts: Martynov, Gankevich 2		Pts: De La Blanca 17; Rebs: Diop 8 Asts: Martin 10

Hala Dukla, Pardubice
Attendance: 200
Referees: Luigi Lamonica (ITA), Antonis Demetriou (CYP), Vladimir Tsekov (BUL)

1 August 2011
18:00

Report

Serbia	88–75	Czech Republic
Scoring by quarter: 30–18, 14–18, 24–22, 20–17
Pts: Rebić 21; Rebs: Ristić 8 Asts: Rebić, Gudurić 4		Pts: Kouril, Peterka 20; Rebs: Peterka 17; Asts: Kouril 8

Hala Dukla, Pardubice
Attendance: 500
Referees: Joseph Bissang (FRA), Alakbar Hasanov (AZE), Jurgis Laurinavicius (LTU)

1 August 2011
20:15

Report

Germany	55–49	Greece
Scoring by quarter: 15–9, 13–16, 10–14, 17–10
Pts: Akpinar 13; Rebs: Wimberg 11; Asts: Taylor, Ugrai 2		Pts: Liapis 2 Rebs: Spyridonidis 5 Asts: Poulianitis 2

Hala Dukla, Pardubice
Attendance: 200
Referees: Tomislav Vovk (CRO), Saverio Lanzarini (ITA), Sergiy Zashchuk (UKR)

2 August 2011
15:45

Report

Greece	74–82	Serbia
Scoring by quarter: 18–14, 17–28, 23–17, 18–23
Pts: Liapis 18; Rebs: Spyropoulos 7 Asts: Papadionysioy 7		Pts: Rebić, Djukanovic 16; Rebs: Gudurić 8 Asts: Gudurić 4

Sports Hall Trebes, Hradec Králové
Attendance: 250
Referees: Tomasz Trawicki (POL), Sigmundur Herbertsson (ISL), Vladimir Tsekov (BUL)

2 August 2011
18:00

Report

Czech Republic	80–75	Russia
Scoring by quarter: 15–11, 25–31, 21–14, 19–19
Pts: Peterka 26; Rebs: Peterka 17; Asts: Kouril 8		Pts: Sizov 25; Rebs: Sizov 8 Asts: Martynov 3

Sports Hall Trebes, Hradec Králové
Attendance: 650
Referees: Jesed Diaz Bloncourt (PUR), Vladan Sundic (MNE), Alexandru Olaru (ROU)

2 August 2011
20:15

Report

Spain	54–42	Germany
Scoring by quarter: 15–9, 15–17, 17–5, 7–11
Pts: Sans 12; Rebs: Diop 8 Asts: De La Blanca 3		Pts: Akpinar 12; Rebs: Wimberg 8 Asts: four players 1

Sports Hall Trebes, Hradec Králové
Attendance: 245
Referees: Joseph Bissang (FRA), Athanasios Ikonomou (SWE), Saverio Lanzarini (ITA)

3 August 2011
15:45

Report

Russia	81–70	Greece
Scoring by quarter: 18–17, 21–16, 19–15, 23–22
Pts: Sizov 23; Rebs: Zhulkov 13; Asts: Fedorchenko 4		Pts: Diamantakos 14; Rebs: Charalampopoulos 8 Asts: three players 2

Hala Dukla, Pardubice
Attendance: 200
Referees: Joseph Bissang (FRA), Saverio Lanzarini (ITA), Martins Briedis (LAT)

3 August 2011
20:15

Report

Serbia	72–74	Spain
Scoring by quarter: 17–21, 14–11, 15–16, 26–26
Pts: Djukanovic 17; Rebs: Gudurić 8 Asts: Rebic 4		Pts: Sans 16; Rebs: Sans 11; Asts: Sans 5

Hala Dukla, Pardubice
Attendance: 300
Referees: Ioannis Foufis (GRE), Tomislav Vovk (CRO), Vladimir Tsekov (BUL)

3 August 2011
18:00

Report

Germany	72–78	Czech Republic
Scoring by quarter: 25–29, 16–18, 13–15, 18–16
Pts: Taylor 17; Rebs: Stielow, Ugrai 9 Asts: Akpinar 4		Pts: Kouril 19; Rebs: Peterka 10; Asts: Kouril 7

Hala Dukla, Pardubice
Attendance: 850
Referees: Tomasz Trawicki (POL), Sergiy Zashchuk (UKR), Athanasios Ikonomou (SWE)

==== Group F ====
Team	Pld	W	L	PF	PA	PD	Pts	Tiebreaker
Croatia	5	5	0	400	364	+36	10	
France	5	4	1	323	277	+46	9	
Turkey	5	3	2	339	317	+22	8	
Latvia	5	2	3	328	336	−8	7	
Italy	5	1	4	322	347	−25	6	
Ukraine	5	0	5	296	367	−71	5	

1 August 2011
15:45

Report

Turkey	75–72	Latvia
Scoring by quarter: 8–20, 27–15, 17–15, 23–22
Pts: Birsen 18; Rebs: Birsen 9 Asts: Birsen 6		Pts: Zvigurs 19; Rebs: Zvigurs 11; Asts: Zvigurs 4

Sports Hall Trebes, Hradec Králové
Attendance: 100
Referees: Tomasz Trawicki (POL), Vladan Sundic (MNE), Carlos Cortes (ESP)

1 August 2011
18:00

Report

Italy	56–76	France
Scoring by quarter: 18–19, 21–26, 9–16, 8–15
Pts: Spatti 13; Rebs: Akele 7 Asts: Maccaferri 6		Pts: Inglis 22; Rebs: Inglis, Laporal 9 Asts: four players 2

Sports Hall Trebes, Hradec Králové
Attendance: 250
Referees: Ioannis Foufis (GRE), Milan Adamovic (BIH), Uros Obrknezevic (SRB)

1 August 2011
20:15

Report

Croatia	86–83	Ukraine
Scoring by quarter: 26–17, 22–24, 18–22, 20–20
Pts: Hezonja 19; Rebs: Hezonja 11; Asts: K. Žganec 5		Pts: Sakhniuk 22; Rebs: Sakhniuk 8 Asts: Boyarkin 6

Sports Hall Trebes, Hradec Králové
Attendance: 253
Referees: Boris Schmidt (GER), Martins Briedis (LAT), Petr Hrusa (CZE)

2 August 2011
15:45

Report

Ukraine	45–68	Italy
Scoring by quarter: 7–13, 11–12, 12–24, 15–19
Pts: Dziuba 11; Rebs: Prokopenko 6 Asts: Boyarkin, Bilous 2		Pts: Baldasso, Di Prampero 16; Rebs: Benvenuti 9 Asts: Prampero, Maccaferri 3

Hala Dukla, Pardubice
Attendance: 100
Referees: Jurgis Laurinavicius (LTU), Milan Adamovic (BIH), Antonis Demetriou (CYP)

2 August 2011
18:00

Report

France	51–44	Turkey
Scoring by quarter: 16–15, 6–12, 16–11, 13–6
Pts: Yao-Delon 16; Rebs: Inglis 8 Asts: Joumard 4		Pts: Osman 12; Rebs: Güleryüz 9 Asts: Özmizrak 3

Hala Dukla, Pardubice
Attendance: 125
Referees: Luigi Lamonica (ITA), Uros Obrknezevic (SRB), Sergiy Zashchuk (UKR)

2 August 2011
20:15

Report

Latvia	56–69	Croatia
Scoring by quarter: 13–21, 16–12, 16–21, 11–15
Pts: Geks 16; Rebs: Rozins 6 Asts: four players 3		Pts: Arapović 15; Rebs: Gabrić 12; Asts: three players 2

Hala Dukla, Pardubice
Attendance: 100
Referees: Boris Schmidt (GER), Alakbar Hasanov (AZE), Carlos Cortes (ESP)

3 August 2011
15:45

Report

Turkey	71–51	Ukraine
Scoring by quarter: 20–11, 16–6, 17–22, 18–12
Pts: Kruszynski 19; Rebs: Alemdaroglu 10; Asts: Özmizrak 5		Pts: Dziuba 11; Rebs: Biella 7 Asts: three players 2

Sports Hall Trebes, Hradec Králové
Attendance: 100
Referees: Boris Schmidt (GER), Vladan Sundic (MNE), Milan Adamovic (BIH)

3 August 2011
18:00

Report

Italy	66–76	Latvia
Scoring by quarter: 21–31, 15–13, 18–16, 12–16
Pts: Maccaferri 25; Rebs: Benvenuti 11; Asts: Prampero 1, Benvenuti		Pts: Geks 25; Rebs: Plavnieks 2, Smits 11; Asts: Geks 1

Sports Hall Trebes, Hradec Králové
Attendance: 150
Referees: Jesed Diaz Bloncourt (PUR), Uros Obrknezevic (SRB), Alakbar Hasanov (AZE)

3 August 2011
20:15

Report

Croatia	68–60	France
Scoring by quarter: 13–5, 17–25, 16–12, 22–18
Pts: Hezonja 22; Rebs: Hezonja 8 Asts: Marinelli 4		Pts: Rigot 18; Rebs: Inglis, Biog 7 Asts: Pontens 3

Sports Hall Trebes, Hradec Králové
Attendance: 200
Referees: Jurgis Laurinavicius (LTU), Alexandru Olaru (ROU), Petr Hrusa (CZE)

=== Classification round ===
The last teams of each group in the preliminary round competed in this Classification Round. The four teams played in one group. The last two teams were relegated to Division B for the next season.

Team will be relegated to Division B.
Team will be stay in Division A.

==== Group G ====
Team	Pld	W	L	PF	PA	PD	Pts	Tiebreaker
Lithuania	6	6	0	527	421	+106	12	
Poland	6	4	2	464	464	0	10	
Bulgaria	6	1	5	476	525	−49	7	1–1 +21
Montenegro	6	1	5	402	459	−57	7	1–1 –21

1 August 2011
13:30

Report

Montenegro	55–73	Lithuania
Scoring by quarter: 8–16, 13–26, 16–13, 18–18
Pts: Djurović 19; Rebs: Savić 7 Asts: Djurovic 4		Pts: Seskus 19; Rebs: Seskus 12; Asts: Serkevicius 5

Sports Hall Trebes, Hradec Králové
Attendance: 100
Referees: Jesed Diaz Bloncourt (PUR), Aytug Ekti (TUR), Alexandru Olaru (ROU)

1 August 2011
13:30

Report

Poland	81–66	Bulgaria
Scoring by quarter: 22–17, 17–24, 18–13, 24–12
Pts: Jeszke 21; Rebs: Witlinski 16; Asts: three players 3		Pts: Vezenkov 30; Rebs: Vezenkov 15; Asts: Vezenkov 3

Hala Dukla, Pardubice
Attendance: 100
Referees: Sigmundur Herbertsson (ISL), Evgeny Vetrov (RUS), Athanasios Ikonomou (SWE)

2 August 2011
13:30

Report

Lithuania	85–78	Poland
Scoring by quarter: 18–16, 20–29, 27–17, 20–16
Pts: Seskus 18; Rebs: Razukas 8 Asts: Seskus 10		Pts: Witlinski 35; Rebs: Witlinski 13; Asts: Zywert 11

Sports Hall Trebes, Hradec Králové
Referees: Tomislav Vovk (CRO), Martins Briedis (LAT), Aytug Ekti (TUR)

2 August 2011
13:30

Report

Bulgaria	68–81	Montenegro
Scoring by quarter: 18–20, 15–15, 18–27, 17–19
Pts: Stoimenov 19; Rebs: Vezenkov 11; Asts: Kochev 3		Pts: Savić 22; Rebs: Draskovic 11; Asts: Latkovic 6

Hala Dukla, Pardubice
Attendance: 100
Referees: Ioannis Foufis (GRE), Evgeny Vetrov (RUS), Petr Hrusa (CZE)

3 August 2011
13:30

Report

Poland	67–55	Montenegro
Scoring by quarter: 16–14, 17–18, 21–12, 13–11
Pts: Witlinski 16; Rebs: Witlinski 20; Asts: Walczak 4		Pts: Djurović, Savić 15; Rebs: Savić 11; Asts: Djurovic 5

Sports Hall Trebes, Hradec Králové
Attendance: 80
Referees: Luigi Lamonica (ITA), Sigmundur Herbertsson (ISL), Evgeny Vetrov (RUS)

3 August 2011
13:30

Report

Lithuania	92–77	Bulgaria
Scoring by quarter: 23–18, 27–17, 23–18, 19–24
Pts: Seskus 25; Rebs: Razukas 8 Asts: Jurgutis 7		Pts: Vezenkov 36; Rebs: Vezenkov, Hadzhirusev 6 Asts: Hadzhirusev 5

Hala Dukla, Pardubice
Attendance: 100
Referees: Carlos Cortes (ESP), Antonis Demetriou (CYP), Aytug Ekti (TUR)

5 August 2011
13:30

Report

Bulgaria	85–104	Poland
Scoring by quarter: 13–24, 24–23, 18–29, 30–28
Pts: Verezinkov 35; Rebs: Verezinkov 11; Asts: Verezinkov 7		Pts: Witlinskii 27; Rebs: Verezinkov 11; Asts: Zywert 6

Sports Hall Trebes, Hradec Králové
Attendance: 80
Referees: Jesed Diaz Bloncourt (PUR), Aytug Ekti (TUR), Milan Adamovic (BIH)

5 August 2011
15:45

Report

Lithuania	76–72	Montenegro
Scoring by quarter: 16–20, 24–16, 22–10, 14–26
Pts: Seskus 29; Rebs: Seskus 8 Asts: Seskus 6		Pts: Savić 23; Rebs: Mijatović 8 Asts: Djurovic 9

Sports Hall Trebes, Hradec Králové
Attendance: 100
Referees: Antonis Demetriou (CYP), Athanasios Ikonomou (SWE), Alakbar Hasanov (AZE)

6 August 2011
13:30

Report

Montenegro	64–98	Bulgaria
Scoring by quarter: 20–23, 10–20, 11–30, 23–25
Pts: Savić 16; Rebs: Savić 7 Asts: Latković, Savić 5		Pts: Vezenkov 40; Rebs: Vezenkov 10; Asts: Stoimenov 8

Sports Hall Trebes, Hradec Králové
Attendance: 100
Referees: Sergiy Zashchuk (UKR), Carlos Cortes (ESP), Alakbar Hasanov (AZE)

6 August 2011
15:45

Report

Poland	57–98	Lithuania
Scoring by quarter: 12–15, 16–27, 15–33, 14–23
Pts: Witlinski 15; Rebs: Pruefer 6 Asts: Zywert 5		Pts: Kavaliauskas 15; Rebs: Kavaliauskas 8 Asts: Kavaliauskas 13

Sports Hall Trebes, Hradec Králové
Attendance: 100
Referees: Ioannis Foufis (GRE), Aytug Ekti (TUR), Evgeny Vetrov (RUS)

7 August 2011
13:30

Report

Montenegro	75–77	Poland
Scoring by quarter: 21–22, 21–22, 18–14, 15–19
Pts: Draskovic, Saric 14; Rebs: Draskovic 9 Asts: Savić 5		Pts: Witlnskii 25; Rebs: Witlnskii 10; Asts: Zywert 10

Sports Hall Trebes, Hradec Králové
Attendance: 50
Referees: Alexandru Olaru (ROU), Athanasios Ikonomou (SWE), Saverio Lanzarini (ITA)

7 August 2011
15:45

Report

Bulgaria	82–103	Lithuania
Scoring by quarter: 14–26, 18–21, 12–34, 38–22
Pts: Three players 15; Rebs: Sakinis 6 Asts: three players 5		Pts: Stoimenov 20; Rebs: Vezenkov 11; Asts: Stoimenov 6

Sports Hall Trebes, Hradec Králové
Attendance: 50
Referees: Sigmundur Herbertsson (ISL), Vladan Sundic (MNE), Alakbar Hasanov (AZE)

== Knockout round ==
=== Championship ===
Quarter-finals
August 5
Croatia	88
Russia	62
August 5
Spain	65
Turkey	54
August 5
Czech Republic	68
Latvia	66
August 5
France	60
Germany	56

Semi-finals
August 6
Croatia	64
Spain	60
August 6
Czech Republic	73
France	65

Final
August 7
Croatia	67
Czech Republic	57
Third place
August 7
Spain	61
France	53

=== 5th–8th playoffs ===
Semi-finals
August 6
Russia	73
Turkey	71
August 6
Latvia	68
Germany	53

Fifth place
August 7
Latvia	70
Russia	84
Seventh place
August 7
Turkey	66
Germany	41

=== 9th–12th playoffs ===
Semi-finals
August 5
Serbia	99
Ukraine	69
August 5
Italy	69
Greece	64

Ninth place
August 7
Serbia	83
Italy	75
Eleventh place
August 7
Ukraine	65
Greece	67

==== Quarterfinals ====
5 August 2011
13:30

Report

Spain	65–54	Turkey
Scoring by quarter: 15–11, 18–6, 12–16, 20–21
Pts: Diop 13; Rebs: Diop 10; Asts: Martin 4		Pts: Osman 17; Rebs: Birsen 8 Asts: three players 2

ČEZ Aréna, Pardubice
Attendance: 150
Referees: Tomasz Trawicki (POL), Jurgis Laurinavicius (LTU), Saverio Lanzarini (ITA)

5 August 2011
15:45

Report

Croatia	88–62	Russia
Scoring by quarter: 26–12, 15–13, 30–21, 17–16
Pts: Hezonja 30; Rebs: Hezonja, Bošnjak 11; Asts: K. Žganec 4		Pts: Sizov 21; Rebs: Sizov 7 Asts: five players 1

ČEZ Aréna, Pardubice
Attendance: 250
Referees: Joseph Bissang (FRA), Vladimir Tsekov (BUL), Sigmundur Herbertsson (ISL)

5 August 2011
18:00

Report

Czech Republic	68–66	Latvia
Scoring by quarter: 17–24, 18–13, 17–22, 16–7
Pts: Slanina 20; Rebs: Peterka 14; Asts: Peterka 6		Pts: Ginters 15; Rebs: Smits 13; Asts: Dulevskis, Smits 4

ČEZ Aréna, Pardubice
Attendance: 2,200
Referees: Luigi Lamonica (ITA), Sergiy Zashchuk (UKR), Vladan Sundic (MNE)

5 August 2011
20:15

Report

France	60–56	Germany
Scoring by quarter: 9–10, 14–16, 16–19, 21–11
Pts: Inglis 22; Rebs: Inglis 14; Asts: Rozenfeld 3		Pts: Mayr 16; Rebs: Ugrai 12; Asts: Akpinar 2

ČEZ Aréna, Pardubice
Attendance: 200
Referees: Ioannis Foufis (GRE), Tomislav Vovk (CRO), Uros Obrknezevic (SRB)

==== Classification 9–12 ====
5 August 2011
18:00

Report

Serbia	99–66	Ukraine
Scoring by quarter: 20–20, 32–18, 21–24, 26–4
Pts: Ristić 22; Rebs: Kaplanovic 11; Asts: Guduric 5		Pts: Prokopenko 23; Rebs: Berezhnyy 8 Asts: Boyarkin 5

Sports Hall Trebes, Hradec Králové
Attendance: 50
Referees: Alexandru Olaru (ROU), Aytug Ekti (TUR), Carlos Cortes (ESP)

5 August 2011
20:15

Report

Italy	69–64	Greece
Scoring by quarter: 15–17, 19–20, 12–15, 23–12
Pts: Fontecchio 23; Rebs: Fontecchio 9 Asts: Di Pampero, Fontecchio 4		Pts: Liapis 12; Rebs: Charalampopoulos 5 Asts: Spyridonidis 3

Sports Hall Trebes, Hradec Králové
Attendance: 100
Referees: Boris Schmidt (GER), Evgeny Vetrov (RUS), Petr Hrusa (CZE)

==== Semifinals ====
6 August 2011
18:00

Report

Croatia	64–60	Spain
Scoring by quarter: 15–13, 17–15, 15–12, 17–20
Pts: Hezonja 24; Rebs: K. Žganec 11; Asts: Hezonja, K. Žganec 5		Pts: Diop 16; Rebs: Diop 9 Asts: three players

ČEZ Aréna, Pardubice
Attendance: 1,200
Referees: Boris Schmidt (GER), Jurgis Laurinavicius (LTU), Alexandru Olaru (ROU)

6 August 2011
20:15

Report

Czech Republic	73–65	France
Scoring by quarter: 12–15, 21–14, 20–11, 20–25
Pts: Peterka 25; Rebs: Slanina 9 Asts: Kouril 5		Pts: Rigot 19; Rebs: Delon 9 Asts: Rozenfeld 5

ČEZ Aréna, Pardubice
Attendance: 2,700
Referees: Tomasz Trawicki (POL), Vladimir Tsekov (BUL), Uros Obrknezevic (SRB)

==== Classification 5–8 ====
6 August 2011
15:45

Report

Russia	73–71	Turkey
Scoring by quarter: 21–29, 20–16, 15–12, 17–14
Pts: Sizov 31; Rebs: Sizov 9 Asts: Klaundikov 4		Pts: Birsen 14; Rebs: Birsen 16; Asts: Kruszynski

ČEZ Aréna, Pardubice
Attendance: 200
Referees: Luigi Lamonica (ITA), Athanasios Ikonomou (SWE), Milan Adamovic (BIH)

6 August 2011
13:30

Report

Latvia	68–53	Germany
Scoring by quarter: 15–17, 19–16, 17–11, 17–9
Pts: Geks 19; Rebs: Geks 9 Asts: Plavnieks, Geks 3		Pts: Akpinar 11; Rebs: Ney 7 Asts: Akpinar 4

ČEZ Aréna, Pardubice
Attendance: 100
Referees: Joseph Bissang (FRA), Antonis Demetriou (CYP), Saverio Lanzarini (ITA)

==== 11th place game ====
6 August 2011
18:00

Report

Ukraine	57–67	Greece
Scoring by quarter: 10–18, 22–16, 16–13, 17–20
Pts: Sakhniuk, Dziuba 17; Rebs: Boyarkin 5 Asts: Bezpaliuk, Prokopenko 8		Pts: Liapis, Diamantakos 12; Rebs: Diamantakos 6 Asts: Liapis 3

Sports Hall Trebes, Hradec Králové
Attendance: 80
Referees: Referees: Tomislav Vovk (CRO), Vladan Sundic (MNE), Petr Hrusa (CZE)

==== 9th place game ====
6 August 2011
20:15

Report

Serbia	83–75	Italy
Scoring by quarter: 19–17, 24–15, 19–17, 21–26
Pts: Ristić 24; Rebs: Ristić 11; Asts: Rebić, Djukanovic 4		Pts: Fontecchio 25; Rebs: Vildera 6 Asts: Akele, Basile 2

Sports Hall Trebes, Hradec Králové
Attendance: 80
Referees: Jesed Diaz Bloncourt (PUR), Sigmundur Herbertsson (ISL), Evgeny Vetrov (RUS)

==== 7th place game ====
7 August 2011
13:30

Report

Germany	41–66	Turkey
Scoring by quarter: 12–11, 13–20, 5–15, 11–20
Pts: Akpinar; Rebs: Ney 10; Asts: Ebert 2		Pts: Birsen 12; Rebs: Sanli 6 Asts: three players

ČEZ Aréna, Pardubice
Attendance: 100
Referees: Tomasz Trawicki (POL), Carlos Cortes (ESP), Petr Hrusa (CZE)

==== 5th place game ====
7 August 2011
15:45

Report

Latvia	70–84	Russia
Scoring by quarter: 16–23, 13–24, 18–17, 23–20
Pts: Gluditis 18; Rebs: Ginters 6 Asts: Dulevskis 6		Pts: Sizov 24; Rebs: Gankevich 7 Asts: Klyundikov 4

ČEZ Aréna, Pardubice
Attendance: 200
Referees: Sergiy Zashchuk (UKR), Jesed Diaz Bloncourt (PUR), Aytug Ekti (TUR)

==== Bronze medal game ====
7 August 2011
18:00

France	53–61 (OT)	Spain
Scoring by quarter: 9–14, 12–19, 7–9, 19–5, Overtime: 6–14
Pts: three players 10; Rebs: Rigot; Asts: Joumard, Rozenfeld 3		Pts: Diop 11; Rebs: Diop 11; Asts: Martin 3

ČEZ Aréna, Pardubice
Attendance: 4000
Referees: Jurgis Laurinavicius (LTU), Tomislav Vovk (CRO), Antonis Demetriou (CYP)

==== Final ====
7 August 2011
20:15

Czech Republic	57–67	Croatia
Scoring by quarter: 19–22, 10–19, 10–12, 18–14
Pts: Peterka; Rebs: Peterka; Asts: Kouril		Pts: Hezonja; Rebs: Bošnjak; Asts: Žganec

ČEZ Aréna, Pardubice
Attendance: 5500
Referees: Luigi Lamonica (ITA), Joseph Bissang (FRA), Ioannis Foufis (GRE)

== Final standings ==
Rank	Team	Record
1st place, gold medalist(s)	Croatia	9–0
2nd place, silver medalist(s)	Czech Republic	7–2
3rd place, bronze medalist(s)	Spain	7–2
4th	France	5–4
5th	Russia	5–4
6th	Latvia	4–5
7th	Turkey	5–4
8th	Germany	4–5
9th	Serbia	5–3
10th	Italy	3–5
11th	Greece	2–6
12th	Ukraine	1–7
13th	Lithuania	7–2
14th	Poland	4–5
15th	Bulgaria	1–8
16th	Montenegro	1–8

2011 FIBA Europe U-16 Championship

Croatia
Third title

Team roster

Lovre Bašić, Ivan Jukić, Paolo Marinelli, Domagoj Bošnjak, Mario Hezonja, Karlo Žganec, Dorian Jelenek, Tomislav Gabrić, Leon Tomić, Marko Arapović, Ivan Bender, Bruno Žganec

Head coach: Ante Nazor.

Qualified for the 2012 FIBA Under-17 World Championship
Qualified as the host nation for the 2012 FIBA Under-17 World Championship
Relegated to the 2012 FIBA Europe Under-16 Championship Division B
