= 2012 FIBA Under-17 World Championship =

Tournament details
- Host country: Lithuania
- City: Kaunas
- Dates: 29 June – 8 July
- Teams: 12 (from 5 confederations)
- Venue: 1 (in 1 host city)

Final positions
- Champions: United States (2nd title)

Tournament statistics
- MVP: (United States) Jahlil Okafor
- Top scorer: (Argentina) Deck (21.5)
- Top rebounds: (China) Zhou (10.1)
- Top assists: (Czech Republic) Kouřil (9.6)
- PPG (Team): United States (100)
- RPG (Team): United States (54.8)
- APG (Team): Croatia (18.5)

Official website
- archive.fiba.com

The 2012 FIBA Under-17 World Championship (Lithuanian: 2012 m. FIBA iki 17 metų pasaulio čempionatas) was the 2nd edition of the FIBA Under-17 World Championship, the biennial international men's youth basketball championship contested by the U17 national teams of the member associations of FIBA. It was hosted by Kaunas, Lithuania from 29 June to 8 July 2012.

The United States defeated Australia to win their second title. Jahlil Okafor was named tournament MVP.

== Qualification ==
12 teams have qualified for this year's edition.

- 2011 FIBA Africa Under-16 Championship
  - Egypt
- 2011 FIBA Asia Under-16 Championship
  - China
  - South Korea
- 2011 FIBA Americas Under-16 Championship
  - Argentina
  - Canada
  - United States
- 2011 FIBA Europe Under-16 Championship
  - Croatia
  - Czech Republic
  - France
  - Spain
- 2011 FIBA Oceania Under-16 Championship
  - Australia
- Host country
  - Lithuania

== Preliminary round ==
The draw took place on January 10, 2012.

Team advanced to Quarterfinals
Team competed in Placement matches

Times given below are in EEST (UTC+3).

=== Group A ===
Team	Pld	W	L	PF	PA	PD	Pts
United States	5	5	0	497	334	+163	10
Australia	5	4	1	374	347	+27	9
China	5	3	2	382	397	–11	8
Czech Republic	5	2	3	331	363	–32	7
France	5	1	4	287	333	–46	6
Egypt	5	0	5	338	435	–97	5

29 June 2012
08:45

Report

Egypt	68–80	China
Scoring by quarter: 9–25, 17–18, 19–21, 23–16
Pts: Hosny 20; Rebs: Amin 6 Asts: three players 2		Pts: Zhao Jiwei 25; Rebs: Zhou Qi 14; Asts: Zhao Jiwei 4

Žalgiris Arena, Kaunas
Referees: Sergey Mikhaylov (RUS), Carlos José Julio (ANG), Jakub Zamojski (POL)

29 June 2012
13:15

Report

Czech Republic	70–64	France
Scoring by quarter: 20–15, 16–11, 17–13, 17–25
Pts: Pecháček 24; Rebs: Peterka 8 Asts: Kouřil 15		Pts: Yao-Delon 16; Rebs: Ebreuil 7 Asts: Joumard 4

Žalgiris Arena, Kaunas
Referees: Petri Mäntylä (FIN), Borys Shulga (UKR), Hussain Hassan Ahmed M. Albloushi (UAE)

29 June 2012
15:30

Report

Australia	67–89	United States
Scoring by quarter: 12–18, 21–21, 14–36, 20–14
Pts: Exum 17; Rebs: Duncan 13; Asts: Djeric 6		Pts: Domingo 17; Rebs: Parker 8 Asts: Frankamp 5

Žalgiris Arena, Kaunas
Referees: Guilherme Locatelli (BRA), Alejandro Sanchez Varela R. (URU), Jurgis Laurinavicius (LTU)

30 June 2012
09:00

Report

China	85–92	Australia
Scoring by quarter: 20–30, 29–23, 15–13, 21–28
Pts: Zhou Qi 22; Rebs: Zhou Qi 6 Asts: Zhao Jiwei 4		Pts: Exum 26; Rebs: Exum 8 Asts: Djeric, Exum 3

Žalgiris Arena, Kaunas
Referees: Alejandro Sanchez Varela R. (URU), Petri Mäntylä (FIN), Damir Javor (SLO)

30 June 2012
11:15

Report

France	78–54	Egypt
Scoring by quarter: 18–9, 13–16, 21–13, 26–16
Pts: Inglis 19; Rebs: Inglis 11; Asts: Pontens 7		Pts: Amin 17; Rebs: Mahmoud 9 Asts: Aly 2

Žalgiris Arena, Kaunas
Referees: Borys Shulga (UKR), Roberto José Fernandez Diaz (CRC), Jurgis Laurinavicius (LTU)

30 June 2012
13:30

Report

United States	95–57	Czech Republic
Scoring by quarter: 24–13, 17–9, 23–23, 31–12
Pts: Johnson 16; Rebs: Okafor 14; Asts: Berry 4		Pts: four players 8 Rebs: Pecháček 8 Asts: Kouřil 3

Žalgiris Arena, Kaunas
Referees: Roberto Vazquez (PUR), Chung Yi-Chih (TPE), Sergey Mikhaylov (RUS)

1 July 2012
09:00

Report

France	53–59	China
Scoring by quarter: 11–14, 19–9, 16–24, 7–12
Pts: three players 10; Rebs: Inglis 13; Asts: Rozenfeld 5		Pts: Han Delong 20; Rebs: Zhao Jiwei 7 Asts: Zhou Qi, Zhao Jiwei 7

Žalgiris Arena, Kaunas
Referees: Jurgis Laurinavicius (LTU), Anastasios Piloidis (GRE), Alejandro Sanchez Varela R. (URU)

1 July 2012
11:15

Report

Czech Republic	58–63	Australia
Scoring by quarter: 11–14, 23–15, 11–20, 13–14
Pts: Pecháček 18; Rebs: Peterka 10; Asts: Kouřil 11		Pts: Simmons 26; Rebs: Duncan 12; Asts: Djeric 9

Žalgiris Arena, Kaunas
Referees: Roberto Vazquez (PUR), Sergey Mikhaylov (RUS), Guilherme Locatelli (BRA)

1 July 2012
13:30

Report

Egypt	73–111	United States
Scoring by quarter: 20–25, 17–25, 15–36, 21–25
Pts: Hosny 13; Rebs: Abdeen, Mahmoud 6 Asts: Amin 4		Pts: Frankamp, Parker 18; Rebs: Okafor 7 Asts: Jones 5

Žalgiris Arena, Kaunas
Referees: Eddie Viator (FRA), Borys Shulga (UKR), Hussain Hassan Ahmed M. Albloushi (UAE)

3 July 2012
11:15

Report

China	71–68	Czech Republic
Scoring by quarter: 15–17, 23–13, 15–32, 18–6
Pts: Zhao Jiwei 20; Rebs: Zhou Qi 15; Asts: Zhao Jiwei 3		Pts: Kouřil 20; Rebs: Pecháček 8 Asts: Kouřil 7

Žalgiris Arena, Kaunas
Referees: Damir Javor (SLO), Roberto José Fernandez Diaz (CRC), Carlos José Julio (ANG)

3 July 2012
15:45

Report

Australia	88–73 (OT)	Egypt
Scoring by quarter: 24–16, 6–19, 22–13, 11–15, Overtime: 7–7, 18–3
Pts: Exum 23; Rebs: Simmons 14; Asts: Djeric 8		Pts: Amin 23; Rebs: Abdeen 8 Asts: Nabil, Osama 4

Žalgiris Arena, Kaunas
Referees: Guilherme Locatelli (BRA), Jurgis Laurinavicius (LTU), Chung Yi-Chih (TPE)

3 July 2012
20:25

Report

United States	86–50	France
Scoring by quarter: 16–13, 24–11, 20–8, 26–18
Pts: Okafor 19; Rebs: Okafor 13; Asts: Jones 5		Pts: Cornelie 14; Rebs: Rozenfeld 7 Asts: Inglis 4

Žalgiris Arena, Kaunas
Referees: Anastasios Piloidis (GRE), Alejandro Sanchez Varela R. (URU), Hussain Hassan Ahmed M. Albloushi (UAE)

4 July 2012
13:30

Report

Egypt	70–78	Czech Republic
Scoring by quarter: 11–23, 12–19, 20–18, 27–18
Pts: three players 12; Rebs: Nabil 6 Asts: Nabil 3		Pts: Peterka 21; Rebs: Dědek 10; Asts: Kouřil 12

Žalgiris Arena, Kaunas
Referees: Jakub Zamojski (POL), Roberto Vazquez (PUR), Hussain Hassan Ahmed M. Albloushi (UAE)

4 July 2012
15:45

Report

France	42–64	Australia
Scoring by quarter: 13–16, 8–16, 12–11, 9–21
Pts: Rigot 11; Rebs: Pfister 8 Asts: Rozenfeld 5		Pts: Krslovic 13; Rebs: Krslovic 8 Asts: Jackson, Purchase 5

Žalgiris Arena, Kaunas
Referees: Damir Javor (SLO), Sergey Milhaylov (RUS), Chung Yi-Chih (TPE)

4 July 2012
20:25

Report

United States	116–87	China
Scoring by quarter: 24–20, 29–28, 24–16, 39–23
Pts: Frankamp 17; Rebs: Winslow 12; Asts: Jones 11		Pts: Yang Linyi 19; Rebs: Liu Bo 8 Asts: Heng Yifeng, Zhou Qi 3

Žalgiris Arena, Kaunas
Referees: Jurgis Laurinavicius (LTU), Borys Shulga (UKR), Carlos José Julio (ANG)

=== Group B ===
Team	Pld	W	L	PF	PA	PD	Pts	Tiebreaker
Croatia	5	5	0	423	335	+88	10	
Spain	5	3	2	380	348	+32	8	1–1, +11
Argentina	5	3	2	410	357	+53	8	1–1, +6
Canada	5	3	2	346	349	–3	8	1–1, –17
Lithuania	5	1	4	425	442	–17	6	
South Korea	5	0	5	358	511	–153	5	

29 June 2012
11:00

Report

South Korea	62–80	Spain
Scoring by quarter: 13–19, 13–18, 15–21, 21–22
Pts: Heo Hoon 19; Rebs: Park In-Tae 11; Asts: Lee Min-Young 7		Pts: Diop 17; Rebs: Diop 13; Asts: Sans 7

Žalgiris Arena, Kaunas
Referees: Anastasios Piloidis (GRE), Thomas James Short (USA), Chung Yi-Chih (TPE)

29 June 2012
18:35

Report

Canada	69–63 (OT)	Lithuania
Scoring by quarter: 13–17, 17–21, 17–9, 14–14, Overtime: 8–2
Pts: Shayok, Zabo 16; Rebs: Egi 7 Asts: Zabo 3		Pts: three players 13; Rebs: Šeškus 14; Asts: Jurgutis 4

Žalgiris Arena, Kaunas
Referees: Christopher Antony Reid (AUS), Roberto José Fernandez Diaz (CRC), Damir Javor (SLO)

29 June 2012
20:40

Report

Argentina	68–78	Croatia
Scoring by quarter: 4–28, 18–18, 21–17, 25–15
Pts: Merlo, Deck 17; Rebs: three players 5 Asts: Merlo 2		Pts: Hezonja 24; Rebs: Hezonja 13; Asts: Marinelli 3

Žalgiris Arena, Kaunas
Referees: Roberto Vazquez (PUR), Robert Vyklicky (CZE), Eddie Viator (FRA)

30 June 2012
15:45

Report

Croatia	66–53	Canada
Scoring by quarter: 20–9, 8–13, 13–16, 25–15
Pts: Hezonja 21; Rebs: Gulam 12; Asts: Arapović 4		Pts: Steeves, Shayok 10; Rebs: Steeves 9 Asts: Steeves, Duvivier 2

Žalgiris Arena, Kaunas
Referees: Robert Vyklicky (CZE), Hussain Hassan Ahmed M. Albloushi (UAE), Anastasios Piloidis (GRE)

30 June 2012
18:10

Report

Lithuania	119–108 (OT)	South Korea
Scoring by quarter: 22–26, 31–31, 23–21, 24–22, Overtime: 19–8
Pts: Zalalis 27; Rebs: Šeškus 15; Asts: Jurgutis 5		Pts: Heo Hoon 37; Rebs: An Young-Jun 7 Asts: Heo Hoon 8

Žalgiris Arena, Kaunas
Referees: Thomas James Short (USA), Carlos José Julio (ANG), Eddie Viator (FRA)

30 June 2012
20:25

Report

Spain	58–68	Argentina
Scoring by quarter: 11–16, 15–19, 17–17, 15–16
Pts: Martiin 11; Rebs: Nogues 8 Asts: three players 2		Pts: Deck 28; Rebs: Deck 8 Asts: Merlo 8

Žalgiris Arena, Kaunas
Referees: Christopher Antony Reid (AUS), Jakub Zamojski (POL), Guilherme Locatelli (BRA)

1 July 2012
15:45

Report

South Korea	68–124	Croatia
Scoring by quarter: 18–25, 18–28, 11–26, 23–45
Pts: An Young-Jun 12; Rebs: Park In-Tae 7 Asts: Lee Min-Young, Won Jong-Hoon 3		Pts: Gabrić 21; Rebs: Gabrić 15; Asts: Jukić 7

Žalgiris Arena, Kaunas
Referees: Jakub Zamojski (POL), Christopher Antony Reid (AUS), Chung Yi-Chih (TPE)

1 July 2012
18:10

Report

Lithuania	83–91 (OT)	Spain
Scoring by quarter: 17–13, 15–23, 22–21, 23–20, Overtime: 6–14
Pts: Serkevičius 21; Rebs: Zalalis 10; Asts: Jutgutis 5		Pts: Sans 24; Rebs: Diop 8 Asts: Martin 7

Žalgiris Arena, Kaunas
Referees: Damir Javor (SLO), Petri Mäntylä (FIN), Robert Vyklicky (CZE)

1 July 2012
20:25

Report

Canada	80–76	Argentina
Scoring by quarter: 14–25, 24–12, 16–18, 25–21
Pts: Zabo 18; Rebs: Shayok 8 Asts: Shayok 4		Pts: Deck 19; Rebs: Deck 10; Asts: Merlo 6

Žalgiris Arena, Kaunas
Referees: Roberto José Fernandez Diaz (CRC), Thomas James Short (USA), Carlos José Julio (ANG)

3 July 2012
09:00

Report

Spain	83–62	Canada
Scoring by quarter: 20–20, 18–13, 24–13, 21–16
Pts: Abalde 21; Rebs: Abalde 6 Asts: Sans 9		Pts: Shayok 17; Rebs: Bhullar 8 Asts: Duvivier, Bhullar 2

Žalgiris Arena, Kaunas
Referees: Eddie Viator (FRA), Petri Mäntylä (FIN), Sergey Mikhaylov (RUS)

3 July 2012
13:30

Report

Argentina	106–59	South Korea
Scoring by quarter: 19–12, 31–10, 29–17, 27–20
Pts: Aristu, Lopez 15; Rebs: Deck 6 Asts: Vildoza 8		Pts: Heo Hoon 13; Rebs: Kim Nak-hyeon, Kim Gook-chan 4 Asts: Kim Nak-hyeon 4

Žalgiris Arena, Kaunas
Referees: Robert Vyklicky (CZE), Borys Shulga (UKR), Christopher Antony Reid (AUS)

3 July 2012
18:10

Report

Croatia	82–78	Lithuania
Scoring by quarter: 21–17, 17–20, 20–14, 24–27
Pts: Žganec 20; Rebs: three players 5 Asts: Arapović 4		Pts: Saprykinas 23; Rebs: Šeškus 9 Asts: Šeškus 4

Žalgiris Arena, Kaunas
Referees: Jakub Zamojski (POL), Roberto Vazquez (PUR), Thomas James Short (USA)

4 July 2012
09:00

Report

South Korea	61–82	Canada
Scoring by quarter: 10–20, 17–12, 15–22, 19–28
Pts: Kim Gook-chan 21; Rebs: Kim Nak-hyeon 9 Asts: Heo Hoon 3		Pts: Duvivier 16; Rebs: Jackson 13; Asts: Zabo, Jackson 4

Žalgiris Arena, Kaunas
Referees: Robert Vyklicky (CZE), Guilherme Locatelli (BRA), Thomas James Short (USA)

4 July 2012
11:15

Report

Croatia	73–68	Spain
Scoring by quarter: 15–16, 25–11, 10–27, 23–14
Pts: Hezonja 30; Rebs: Žganec 8 Asts: Marinelli 5		Pts: Diop 29; Rebs: Diop 19; Asts: Martín 5

Žalgiris Arena, Kaunas
Referees: Eddie Viator (FRA), Christopher Antony Reid (AUS), Roberto José Fernandez Diaz (CRC)

4 July 2012
18:10

Report

Lithuania	82–92	Argentina
Scoring by quarter: 16–24, 16–18, 20–22, 30–28
Pts: Šeškus 23; Rebs: Šeškus 9 Asts: Šeškus 5		Pts: Deck 26; Rebs: Deck 9 Asts: Merlo 8

Žalgiris Arena, Kaunas
Referees: Anastasios Piloidis (GRE), Petri Mäntylä (FIN), Alejandro Sanchez Varela R. (URU)

== 9th–12th playoffs ==
Semi-finals
6 July – Kaunas
France	110
South Korea	50
6 July – Kaunas
Egypt	72
Lithuania	73

Ninth place
7 July – Kaunas
France	64
Lithuania	75
Eleventh place
7 July – Kaunas
South Korea	89
Egypt	83

=== Semifinals ===
6 July 2012
09:00

Report

France	110–50	South Korea
Scoring by quarter: 29–12, 23–6, 24–12, 34–20
Pts: Rozenfeld 21; Rebs: Pfister, Cornelie 8 Asts: three players 4		Pts: Heo Hoon 14; Rebs: Park In-Tae 7 Asts: Lee Min-Young 4

Žalgiris Arena, Kaunas
Referees: Anastasios Piloidis (GRE), Alejandro Sanchez Varela R. (URU), Diego Hernan Rougier (ARG)

6 July 2012
11:15

Report

Lithuania	73–72	Egypt
Scoring by quarter: 14–18, 19–19, 22–13, 18–22
Pts: Šeškus 18; Rebs: Giga 6 Asts: Serkevičius 10		Pts: Aly 19; Rebs: Amin 9 Asts: Amin 3

Žalgiris Arena, Kaunas
Referees: Robert Vyklicky (CZE), Guilherme Locetelli (BRA), Chung Yi-Chih (TPE)

=== Eleventh place playoff ===
7 July 2012
09:00

Report

South Korea	89–83	Egypt
Scoring by quarter: 26–17, 20–18, 24–21, 19–27
Pts: Koh Haeng-Seok 29; Rebs: Koh Haeng-Seok, An Young-Jun 6 Asts: Kim Nak-hyeon 6		Pts: Amin 20; Rebs: Hosny 9 Asts: Aly 7

Žalgiris Arena, Kaunas
Referees: Jurgis Laurinavicius (LTU), Chung Yi-Chih (TPE), Diego Hernan Rougier (ARG)

=== Ninth place playoff ===
7 July 2012
11:15

Report

France	64–75	Lithuania
Scoring by quarter: 19–19, 13–14, 16–21, 16–21
Pts: Inglis 21; Rebs: Inglis 16; Asts: Rozenfeld, Inglis 3		Pts: Serkevičius 19; Rebs: Šeškus 6 Asts: Jurgutis 4

Žalgiris Arena, Kaunas
Referees: Petri Mäntylä (FIN), Carlos José Julio (ANG), Alejandro Sanchez Varela R. (URU)

== Knockout stage ==
Quarter-finals
6 July – Kaunas
United States	113
Canada	59
6 July – Kaunas
Spain	64
China	57
6 July – Kaunas
Australia	78
Argentina	59
6 July – Kaunas
Croatia	94
Czech Republic	71

Semi-finals
7 July – Kaunas
United States	95
Spain	66
7 July – Kaunas
Australia	83
Croatia	71

Final
8 July – Kaunas
United States	95
Australia	62
Third place
8 July – Kaunas
Spain	61
Croatia	93

Semi-finals
7 July – Kaunas
Canada	68
China	64
7 July – Kaunas
Argentina	78
Czech Republic	70

Fifth place
8 July – Kaunas
Canada	84
Argentina	79
Seventh place
8 July – Kaunas
China	77
Czech Republic	70

=== Quarterfinals ===
6 July 2012
13:30

Report

Spain	64–57	China
Scoring by quarter: 11–14, 15–17, 17–10, 21–16
Pts: Diop 24; Rebs: Nogues 12; Asts: Martín 2		Pts: Zhou Qi 20; Rebs: Zhou Qi 15; Asts: Heng Yifeng 4

Žalgiris Arena, Kaunas
Referees: Roberto Vazquez (PUR), Jurgis Laurinavicius (LTU), Borys Shulga (UKR)

6 July 2012
15:45

Report

United States	113–59	Canada
Scoring by quarter: 26–15, 20–15, 32–13, 35–16
Pts: Jones 22; Rebs: Winslow 13; Asts: Jones 6		Pts: Jackson 17; Rebs: Jackson 5 Asts: Bhullar 3

Žalgiris Arena, Kaunas
Referees: Eddie Viator (FRA), Sergey Mikhaylov (RUS), Christopher Antony Reid (AUS)

6 July 2012
18:10

Report

Australia	78–59	Argentina
Scoring by quarter: 14–17, 12–13, 27–23, 25–6
Pts: Exum 23; Rebs: Duncan 13; Asts: Djeric 7		Pts: Deck 19; Rebs: Deck 6 Asts: Vildoza 2

Žalgiris Arena, Kaunas
Referees: Roberto José Fernandez Diaz (CRC), Damir Javor (SLO), Thomas James Short (USA)

6 July 2012
20:25

Report

Croatia	94–71	Czech Republic
Scoring by quarter: 24–21, 18–19, 30–26, 22–5
Pts: Bošnjak 21; Rebs: Arapović 11; Asts: Marinelli, Arapović 7		Pts: Peterka 23; Rebs: Peterka 11; Asts: Kouřil 8

Žalgiris Arena, Kaunas
Referees: Jakub Zamojski (POL), Petri Mäntylä (FIN), Carlos José Julio (ANG)

=== 5th–8th semifinals ===
7 July 2012
13:30

Report

China	64–68	Canada
Scoring by quarter: 14–23, 11–13, 17–6, 22–26
Pts: Guo Xiaopeng, Zhou Qi 21; Rebs: Zhou Qi 10; Asts: Zhao Jiwei, Zhou Qi 2		Pts: Jackson 23; Rebs: Shayok 10; Asts: Zabo, Bellot-Green 3

Žalgiris Arena, Kaunas
Referees: Anastasios Piloidis (GRE), Sergey Mikhaylov (RUS), Christopher Antony Reid (AUS)

July 7
15:45

Report

Argentina	78–70	Czech Republic
Scoring by quarter: 13–17, 22–15, 24–20, 19–18
Pts: Deck 28; Rebs: Deck 9 Asts: Merlo 6		Pts: Dědek 15; Rebs: Peterka 8 Asts: Kouřil 9

Žalgiris Arena, Kaunas
Referees: Roberto José Fernandez Diaz (CRC), Borys Sulga (UKR), Thomas James Short (USA)

=== Semifinals ===
7 July 2012
18:10

Report

United States	95–66	Spain
Scoring by quarter: 14–19, 29–18, 26–17, 26–12
Pts: Winslow 17; Rebs: Winslow 13; Asts: Jones 4		Pts: Martín, Adrover 8 Rebs: Bauza 5 Asts: Sans 6

Žalgiris Arena, Kaunas
Referees: Damir Javor (SLO), Robert Vyklicky (CZE), Guilherme Locetelli (BRA)

7 July 2012
20:25

Report

Australia	83–71	Croatia
Scoring by quarter: 21–24, 21–11, 24–16, 17–20
Pts: Djeric 21; Rebs: Duncan 8 Asts: Djeric 9		Pts: Hezonja 28; Rebs: Hezonja, Žganec 7 Asts: Marinelli, Žganec 5

Žalgiris Arena, Kaunas
Referees: Eddie Viator (FRA), Roberto Vazquez (PUR), Jakub Zamojski (POL)

=== Seventh place playoff ===
8 July 2012
13:30

Report

China	77–70	Czech Republic
Scoring by quarter: 20–25, 19–13, 20–21, 18–11
Pts: Wang Zhengbo, Zhou Qi 16; Rebs: Zhou Qi 9 Asts: Zhao Jiwei 6		Pts: Pecháček 16; Rebs: Kouřil 7 Asts: Kouřil 12

Žalgiris Arena, Kaunas
Referees: Petri Mäntylä (FIN), Anastasios Piloidis (GRE), Guilherme Locetelli (BRA)

=== Fifth place playoff ===
8 July 2012
15:45

Report

Canada	84–79	Argentina
Scoring by quarter: 32–22, 12–19, 22–16, 18–22
Pts: Zabo 26; Rebs: three players 7 Asts: Jackson 2		Pts: Deck 26; Rebs: Vaulet, Deck 5 Asts: Merlo 7

Žalgiris Arena, Kaunas
Referees: Borys Shulga (UKR), Robert Vyklicky (CZE), Sergey Mikhaylov (RUS)

=== Bronze medal game ===
8 July 2012
18:00

Report

Spain	61–93	Croatia
Scoring by quarter: 11–15, 12–28, 21–23, 17–27
Pts: Diop 13; Rebs: Diop 5 Asts: Diop 2		Pts: Hezonja 23; Rebs: Hezonja 8 Asts: Marinelli, Bošnjak 5

Žalgiris Arena, Kaunas
Referees: Jakub Zamojski (POL), Roberto Vazquez (PUR), Jurgis Laurinavicius (LTU)

=== Final ===
8 July 2012
20:30

Report

United States	95–62	Australia
Scoring by quarter: 22–14, 16–10, 24–19, 31–19
Pts: Frankamp 22; Rebs: Winslow 11; Asts: Jones 6		Pts: Exum 21; Rebs: Exum 6 Asts: Purchase 4

Žalgiris Arena, Kaunas
Referees: Eddie Viator (FRA), Damir Javor (SLO), Roberto José Fernandez Diaz (CRC)

== Final standings ==
Rank	Team	Record
1st place, gold medalist(s)	United States	8–0
2nd place, silver medalist(s)	Australia	6–2
3rd place, bronze medalist(s)	Croatia	7–1
4th	Spain	4–4
5th	Canada	5–3
6th	Argentina	4–4
7th	China	4–4
8th	Czech Republic	2–6
9th	Lithuania	3–4
10th	France	2–5
11th	South Korea	1–6
12th	Egypt	0–7

== Awards ==
2012 Under-17 World Championship winner

United States
Second title

Most Valuable Player
(United States) Jahlil Okafor

All-Tournament Team

- (Australia) Dante Exum
- (Croatia) Mario Hezonja
- (United States) Justise Winslow
- (Argentina) Gabriel Deck
- (United States) Jahlil Okafor

== Statistical leaders ==
Points

Name	PPG
(Argentina) Gabriel Deck	21.5
(Croatia) Mario Hezonja	20.8
(South Korea) Heo Hoon	17.7
(Australia) Dante Exum	17.3
(Lithuania) Edvinas Šeškus	15.7
(Egypt) Ehab Amin	15.7

Rebounds

Name	RPG
(China) Zhou Qi	10.1
(Croatia) Karlo Žganec	9
(Lithuania) Edvinas Šeškus	9
(United States) Justise Winslow	8.8
(Czech Republic) Martin Peterka	8.6

Assists

Name	APG
(Czech Republic) Radovan Kouřil	9.6
(Australia) Mirko Djeric	5.6
(United States) Tyus Jones	5.4
(Argentina) Alvaro Merlo	5.1
(Croatia) Paolo Marinelli	4.4

Blocks

Name	BPG
(China) Zhou Qi	4
(Egypt) Moataz Hosny	4
(Spain) Ilimane Diop	2.6
(Egypt) Anas Osama Mahmoud	2.1
(South Korea) Park In-Tae	2

Steals

Name	SPG
(China) Zhao Jiwei	2.9
(Spain) Alberto Martín	2.6
(United States) Justise Winslow	2.6
(Egypt) Ehab Amin	2.4
(Croatia) Mario Hezonja	2.3
(Argentina) Alvaro Merlo	2.3

== Referees ==
The International Basketball Federation (FIBA) named the following 19 referees to officiate the basketball games at this tournament.

- (United Arab Emirates) Hussain Hassan Ahmed M. Albloushi
- (Chinese Taipei) Chung Yi-Chih
- (Costa Rica) Roberto José Fernandez Diaz
- (Slovenia) Damir Javor
- (Angola) Carlos Jose Julio
- (Lithuania) Jurgis Laurinavičius
- (Brazil) Guilherme Locatelli
- (Finland) Petri Mantyla
- (Russia) Sergey Mikhaylov
- (Greece) Anastasios Piloidis
- (Australia) Christopher Antony Reid
- (Argentina) Diego Hernan Rougier
- (Uruguay) Alejandro Sanchez Varela
- (United States) Thomas James Short
- (Ukraine) Borys Shulga
- (Puerto Rico) Roberto Vazquez
- (France) Eddie Viator
- (Czech Republic) Robert Vyklicky
- (Poland) Jakub Zamojski

== Broadcasting rights ==
- Lithuania - Lietuvos rytas TV
