= Croatia men's national under-16 and under-17 basketball team =

Croatian youth sports team

Croatia
- Joined FIBA: 1992
- FIBA zone: FIBA Europe
- National federation: Croatian Basketball Federation

U17 World Cup
- Appearances: 2
- Medals: Bronze: 1 (2012)

U16 EuroBasket
- Appearances: 22
- Medals: Gold: 4 (1995, 2010, 2011, 2018)

U16 EuroBasket Division B
- Appearances: 3
- Medals: Gold: 2 (2023, 2026)
Home	Away

Croatia men's national under-16 and under-17 basketball team
Medal record

Men's basketball

Representing Croatia

FIBA U17 World Cup
Bronze medal – third place	2012 Kaunas	

FIBA U16 EuroBasket
Gold medal – first place	1995 Setúbal, Seixal & Almada	
Gold medal – first place	2010 Bar	
Gold medal – first place	2011 Hradec Králové & Pardubice	
Gold medal – first place	2018 Novi Sad	

The Croatia men's national under-16 and under-17 basketball team are boys' basketball teams, administered by the Croatian Basketball Federation, that represent Croatia in international youth men's basketball competitions. The Croatia men's national under-16 basketball team (Hrvatska kadetska reprezentacija) represents Croatia at the FIBA U16 EuroBasket, where it has a chance to qualify for the FIBA U17 World Cup.

== U17 World Cup record ==
Year	Pos.	GP	W	L	Ref.
(Germany) 2010	Did not qualify				
(Lithuania) 2012	Bronze medal	8	7	1	
(United Arab Emirates) 2014	Did not qualify				
(Spain) 2016	Did not qualify				
(Argentina) 2018	7th	7	4	3	
(Spain) 2022	Did not qualify				
(Turkey) 2024	Did not qualify				
(Turkey) 2026	Did not qualify				
(Greece) 2028	To be determined				
Total	2/9	15	11	4	

=== Past rosters ===
2012 Championship	2018 World Cup
4 Josip Gulam; 5 Ivan Jukić; 6 Paolo Marinelli; 7 Domagoj Bošnjak; 8 Mario Hezonja (ATT); 9 Andrija Ćorić; 10 Dorian Jelinek; 11 Tomislav Gabrić; 12 David Škara; 13 Marko Arapović; 14 Ivan Bender; 15 Karlo Žganec	4 Filip Paponja; 5 Roko Gizdavčić; 6 Matej Rudan; 7 Sandro Rašić; 8 Ivan Gulin; 9 Lovro Gnjidić; 10 Roko Škarica; 11 Roko Prkačin; 12 Žarko Parlov; 13 Ivan Perasović; 14 Matej Bošnjak; 15 Viktor Šarić

== U16 EuroBasket record ==
Division A						Division B					
Year	Pos.	GP	W	L	Ref.	Year	Pos.	GP	W	L	Ref.
1971–1991	Part of SFR Yugoslavia										
(Portugal) 1995	1st	7	7	0							
(Belgium) 1997	8th	8	2	6							
(Slovenia) 1999	9th	7	4	3							
(Latvia) 2001	12th	7	1	6							
(Spain) 2003	Did not participate										
(Greece) 2004	10th	8	5	3							
(Spain) 2005	8th	8	4	4							
(Spain) 2006	8th	8	2	6							
(Greece) 2007	8th	8	2	6							
(Italy) 2008	7th	8	4	4							
(Lithuania) 2009	6th	9	4	5							
(Montenegro) 2010	1st	9	7	2							
(Czech Republic) 2011	1st	9	9	0							
(Lithuania) (Latvia) 2012	8th	9	4	5							
(Ukraine) 2013	6th	9	7	2							
(Latvia) 2014	11th	9	4	5							
(Lithuania) 2015	9th	9	4	5							
(Poland) 2016	4th	7	4	3							
(Montenegro) 2017	4th	7	2	5							
(Serbia) 2018	1st	7	6	1							
(Italy) 2019	8th	7	3	4							
(North Macedonia) 2022	14th	7	3	4							
(North Macedonia) 2023	Did not qualify					(Romania) 2023	1st	8	8	0	
(Greece) 2024	16th	7	0	7							
(Georgia (country)) 2025	Did not qualify					(North Macedonia) 2025	8th	8	5	3	
(Romania) 2026	Did not qualify					(North Macedonia) 2026	1st	8	8	0	
Total (Division A)	22/25	174	88	86		Total (Division B)	3/21	24	21	3	

Relegated to the U16 EuroBasket Division B

=== Past rosters ===
1995 Championship	1997 Championship	1999 Championship	2001 Championship	2004 Championship	2005 Championship	2006 Championship
4 Ante Samac; 5 Edo Mlatac; 6 Stjepan Marinović; 7 Jere Macura; 8 Ivan Bračić; 9 Ivan Tomeljak; 10 Bruno Gulin; 11 Andrej Štimac; 12 Domagoj Vidaković; 13 Martin Kuzmić; 14 Nikola Vujčić; 15 Dalibor Bagarić	4 Igor Lovrić; 5 Mladen Gligora; 6 Marko Popović; 7 Marko Morić; 8 Vlado Pašalić; 9 Željko Župić; 10 Tomislav Knežević; 11 Ivan Tomas; 12 Krešimir Lončar; 13 Tomislav Lozančić; 14 Zoran Pehar; 15 Martin Mihajlović	4 Andrija Krešić; 5 Eduard Pulja; 6 Vedran Morović; 7 Krešimir Lončar; 8 Luka Lekić; 9 Marin Vrsaljko; 10 Ozren Mišić; 11 Drago Pašalić; 12 Toni Dijan; 13 Stipe Jeličić; 14 Damir Rančić; 15 Aleksandar Čuić	4 Ante Paić; 5 Ivan Samac; 6 Krunoslav Simon; 7 Petar Babić; 8 Tomislav Ramljak; 9 Damir Markota; 10 Marko Tomas; 11 Nikola Garma; 12 Luka Pavić; 13 Alen Trepalovac; 14 Marko Palada; 15 Ivan Novačić	4 Mario Filipović; 5 Teo Petani; 6 Aleksandar Ugrinoski; 7 Ante Đugum; 8 Davor Galić; 9 Đuro Bjegović; 10 Ante Delaš; 11 Ivan Uvodić; 12 Toni Soda; 13 Filip Vukičević; 14 Marko Sandrić; 15 Jakov Bačić	4 Marko Radić; 5 Luka Klarica; 6 Karlo Vragović; 7 Bojan Bogdanović; 8 Josip Sobin; 9 Ivan Penić; 10 Fran Pilepić; 11 Marijo Hajdić; 12 Ivan Baždarić; 13 Marino Šarlija; 14 Stjepan Tešija; 15 Tomislav Troskot	4 Lovro Reljanović; 5 Toni Prostran; 6 Ivan Kovač; 7 Sven Smajlagić; 8 Luka Mijalić; 9 Goran Fodor; 10 Zvonimir Bagarić; 11 Krešimir Mustapić; 12 Daniel Popović; 13 Mario Delaš; 14 Leon Radošević; 15 Tomislav Zubčić

2007 Championship	2008 Championship	2009 Championship	2010 Championship	2011 Championship	2012 Championship	2013 Championship
4 Ivan Mikulić; 5 Marko Matulja; 6 Luka Pešut; 7 Toni Brnas; 8 Dino Jakoliš; 9 Matteo Juričić; 10 Toni Prostran; 11 Ivan Batur; 12 Ante Čutura; 13 Vilim Poljak; 14 Dragan Sekelja; 15 Domagoj Bubalo	4 Stefan Zadravec; 5 Roko Rogić; 6 Toni Katić; 7 Marko Ramljak; 8 Karlo Pernuš; 9 Marino Kučan; 10 Boris Barać; 11 Alex Percan; 12 Josip Surina; 13 Filip Najev; 14 Danilo Vuković; 15 Dino Repeša	4 Stipe Čubrić; 5 Martin Junaković; 6 Roko Jurlina; 7 Mihael Marić; 8 Henrik Širko; 9 Matej Buovac; 10 Antonio Boban; 11 Stipe Krstanović; 12 Dario Šarić; 13 Luka Vlaić; 14 Marko Ramljak; 15 Josip Mikulić	4 Mislav Brzoja; 5 Martin Junaković; 6 Karlo Lebo; 7 Ivan Jukić; 8 Dino Šamanić; 9 Dario Šarić MVP; 10 Dominik Mavra; 11 Antonio Črnjević; 12 Tomislav Radoš; 13 Nikola Urli; 14 Daniel Zovko; 15 Filip Bundović	4 Lovre Bašić; 5 Ivan Jukić; 6 Paolo Marinelli; 7 Domagoj Bošnjak; 8 Mario Hezonja MVP; 9 Bruno Žganec; 10 Dorian Jelenek; 11 Tomislav Gabrić; 12 Leon Tomić; 13 Marko Arapović; 14 Ivan Bender; 15 Karlo Žganec	4 Emir Šabić; 5 Roko Dominović; 6 Arian Došen; 7 Dragan Bender; 8 Ivan Karačić; 9 Ivan Vučić; 10 Luka Božić; 11 Leon Tomić; 12 Antonio Vranković; 13 Marko Jurica; 14 Lovro Mazalin; 15 Marko Arapović	4 Borna Skokna; 5 Vuk Lazić; 6 Petar Dubelj; 7 Dragan Bender; 8 Franko Kalpić; 9 Toni Kumanović; 10 Nik Slavica; 11 Ivica Zubac; 12 Ante Žižić; 13 Mateo Čolak; 14 Lovro Mazalin; 15 Matej Gašpert

2014 Championship	2015 Championship	2016 Championship	2017 Championship	2018 Championship	2019 Championship	2022 Championship
4 Karlo Uljarević; 5 Ante Martinac; 6 Mate Kalajžić; 7 Luka Kotrulja; 8 Marko Prskalo; 9 Emil Savić; 10 Vuk Lazić; 11 Leo Čizmić; 12 Darko Bajo; 13 Mateo Čolak; 14 Lovro Buljević; 15 Krešimir Ljubičić	4 Antonio Jordano; 5 Mateo Vidović; 6 Antonio Jularić; 7 Ivan Omrčen; 8 Domagoj Šarić; 9 Toni Nakić; 10 Gabriel Marić; 11 Mateo Drežnjak; 12 Ivan Vrgoč; 13 Marin Mihalić; 14 Darko Bajo; 15 Luka Sunara	4 Jure Planinić; 5 Oton Janković; 6 Vito Čubrilo; 7 Kruno Macner; 8 Dino Bistrović; 9 Jan Palokaj; 10 Roko Erslan; 11 Dorian Benković; 12 Emil Sušac; 13 Luka Šamanić; 14 Jakov Kukić; 15 Viktor Šarić	4 Antonio Petrović; 5 Roko Gizdavić; 6 Karlo Lukačić; 7 Sandro Rašić; 8 Ivan Gulin; 9 Ivan Perasović; 10 Matej Rudan; 11 Matej Bošnjak; 12 Roko Škarica; 13 Viktor Šarić; 14 Boris Tišma; 15 Mislav Majić	4 Filip Paponja; 5 Dominik Rašić; 6 Ivan Perasović; 7 Hrvoje Majcunić; 8 Roko Prkačin MVP; 9 Boris Tišma; 10 Duje Brala; 11 Matej Bošnjak; 12 Lukša Buljević; 13 Ante Perkušić; 14 Mario Krešić; 15 Tomislav Ivišić	4 Juraj Pleadin; 5 Antonio Klarin; 6 Nikola Lebo; 7 Zvonimir Ivišić; 8 Antonio Santić; 9 Filip Kalajžić; 11 Noa Svoboda; 12 Duje Brala; 13 Tomislav Ivišić; 14 Roko Rađa; 15 Ante Beljan; 16 Luka Krajnović	4 Nino Žarković; 5 Tonko Škugor; 6 Dino Subašić; 7 Roko Jemo; 8 Dominik Dolić; 9 Ivan Jurić; 11 Ivan Volf; 12 Vito Perković; 13 Michael Ružić; 14 Martin Krešić; 15 Petar Miović; 16 Josip Pavković

== See also ==
- Croatia men's national basketball team
- Croatia men's national under-18 and under-19 basketball team
- Croatia women's national under-16 and under-17 basketball team
