= Damien Inglis =

French basketball player (born 1995)

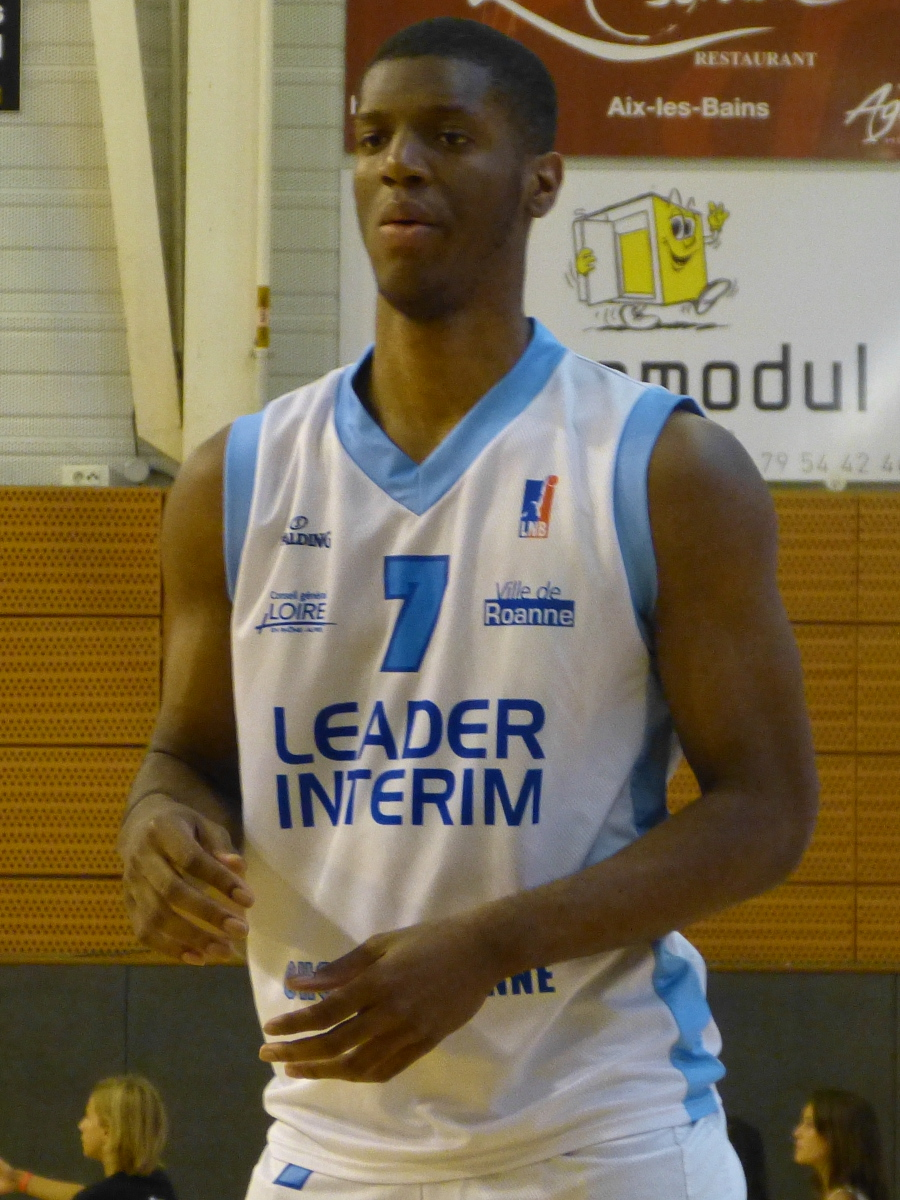
- Inglis with Roanne in 2013.

No. 7 – Bahçeşehir Koleji
- Position: Power forward
- League: Basketbol Süper Ligi; EuroCup

Personal information
- Born: May 20, 1995 (age 31) Cayenne, French Guiana
- Listed height: 6 ft 8 in (2.03 m)
- Listed weight: 240 lb (109 kg)

Career information
- High school: INSEP (Paris, France)
- NBA draft: 2014: 2nd round, 31st overall pick
- Drafted by: Milwaukee Bucks
- Playing career: 2010–present

Career history
- 2010–2013: Centre Fédéral
- 2013–2014: Chorale Roanne
- 2014–2016: Milwaukee Bucks
- 2015: → Canton Charge
- 2016: → Westchester Knicks
- 2016–2017: Westchester Knicks
- 2017: Orlandina
- 2017–2018: SIG Strasbourg
- 2018–2019: Limoges CSP
- 2019–2020: SIG Strasbourg
- 2020–2021: AS Monaco
- 2021–2022: Bilbao
- 2022–2023: Gran Canaria
- 2023–2024: Valencia
- 2024–2026: Yokohama B-Corsairs
- 2026–present: Bahçeşehir Koleji

Career highlights
- EuroCup champion (2021, 2023); French Cup winner (2018)
- Stats at NBA.com
- Stats at Basketball Reference

Damien Roberto Inglis (/ˈdɑːmiən/ DAH-mee-ən; born May 20, 1995) is a French professional basketball player for Bahçeşehir Koleji of the Basketbol Süper Ligi and EuroCup He was selected with the 31st overall pick in the 2014 NBA draft by the Bucks and represents France in international competition.

== Early life ==
Born in Cayenne, French Guiana, Inglis was a big soccer fan, but as his cousins played streetball, he first began playing basketball at age nine before moving to Paris as a teenager. Several years later, he recalled his move to Paris saying, "I was by myself. I left French Guiana when I was 14 years old. My family was far and I had to play basketball. It was cold, it was tough. I was family-sick, homesick. But I really wanted to make it, so that’s why I kept going."

Inglis grew up playing with INSEP, a French training institute for excellence in sports. The school had been previously attended by several promising NBA players such as Tony Parker, Boris Diaw and Ronny Turiaf. During his time with INSEP, he participated in two Nike International Junior Tournaments.

== Professional career ==
=== Centre Fédéral (2010–2013) ===
In association with INSEP, Inglis played for Centre Fédéral de Basket-ball of the Nationale Masculine 1, the third level professional league in France, from 2010 to 2013. While mostly playing for the U21 team in 2010–11, he did manage two games for Centre Fédéral, averaging three points and three rebounds per game. In 2011–12, he played 28 games, averaging 5.9 points and 3.4 rebounds per game.

On October 6, 2012, Inglis recorded 16 points, 11 rebounds and 6 assists against Cognac Charente Basketball and scored a season-high 31 points on November 10, 2012, against ADA Blois Basket, also adding on with nine total rebounds. The team would still lose the game by over 20 points. In 2012–13, he averaged 15.6 points, 7.3 rebounds, 3.8 assists, 1.5 steals and 1.2 blocks per game.

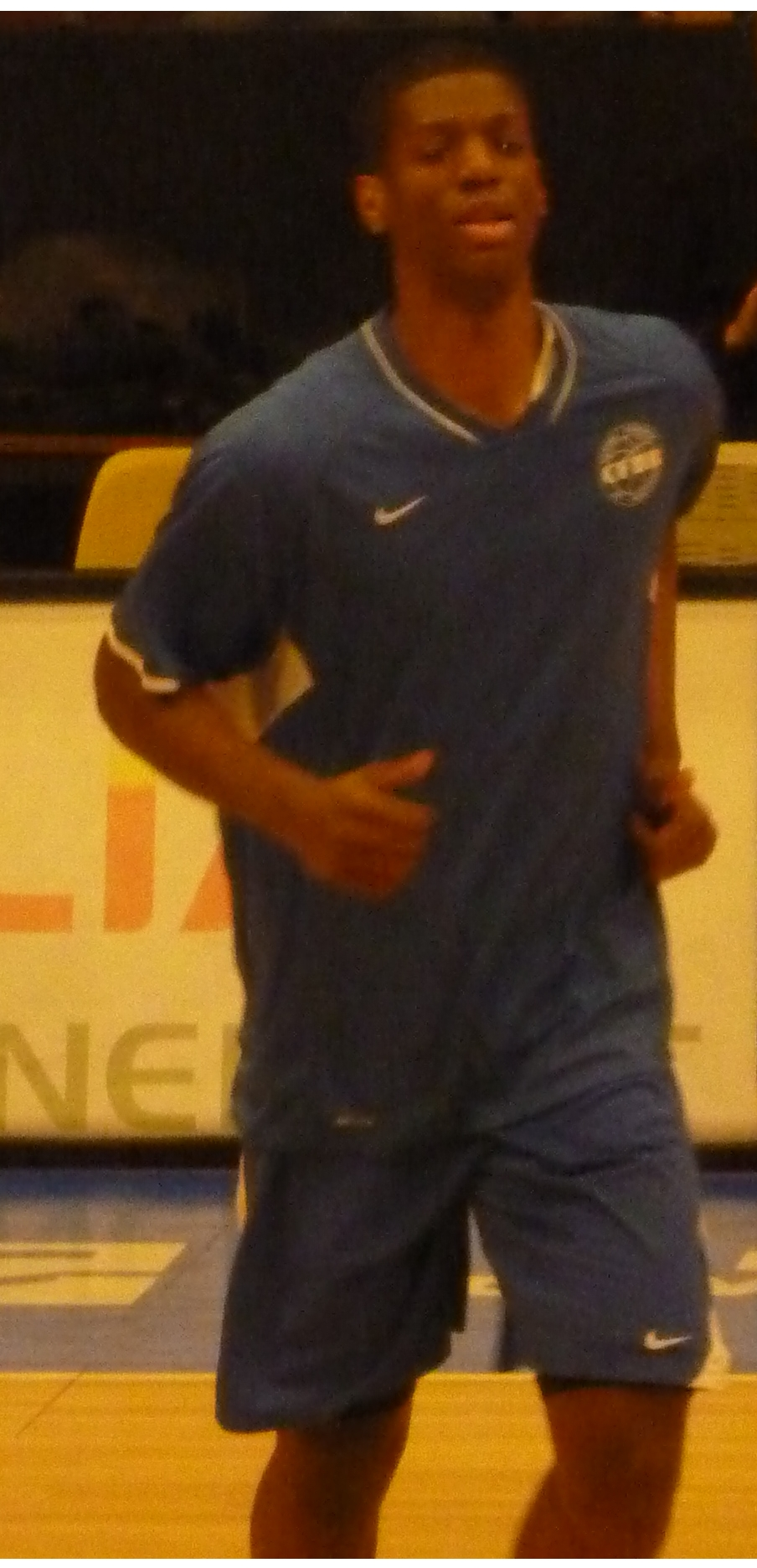
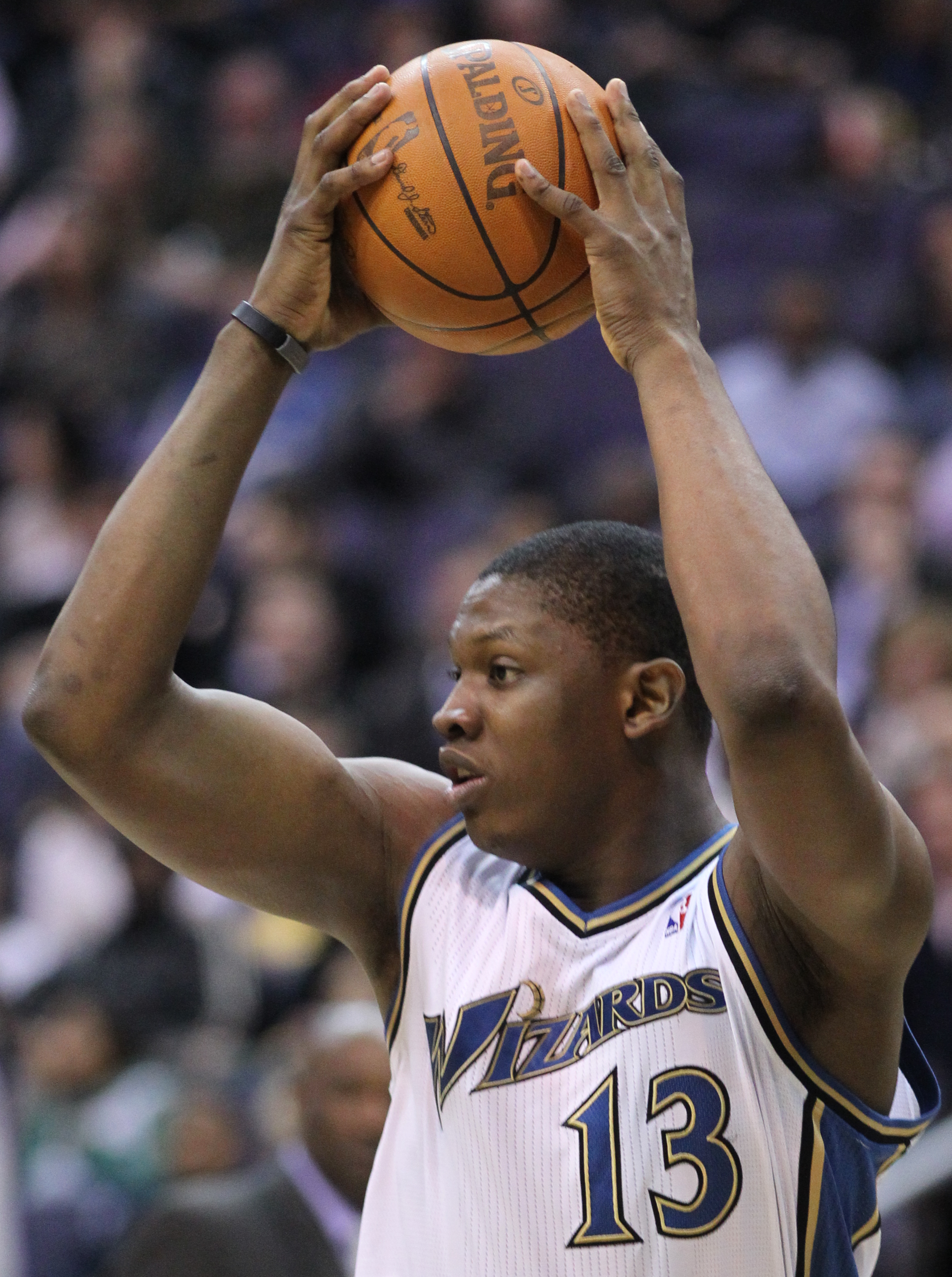
After signing with the Milwaukee Bucks, Inglis (left) became the second active French Guianese player in the NBA, the other one being Kevin Séraphin (right).

Inglis returned to NIJT play on February 22, 2013, against the KK Cedevita junior team, with 17 points, 8 rebounds, and 8 assists. Inglis scored 30 points against the USK Future Stars, marking his career-high scoring record in the event. Due to his success through the competition, Inglis was named to the 2013 NIKE International Junior All-Tournament team. Other recipients of the award were Nikola Jokić, Vasilije Pusica, Nikola Rebić, and Dušan Ristić.

=== Chorale Roanne (2013–2014) ===
On June 4, 2013, Inglis signed a three-year deal with Chorale Roanne Basket of the LNB Pro A. He debuted with the team on October 5, 2013, with 5 points and 2 rebounds against BCM Gravelines. Inglis also shot 2-of-3 from the field and made his only three-pointer attempted. His first double-digit scoring performance took place on November 2, 2013, when he logged 14 points, 7 rebounds, and 1 assist against JDA Dijon Basket. Inglis was finally allowed a start by head coach Luka Pavičević on December 14, 2013, against Orléans Loiret Basket, recording 3 points, 3 rebounds, and 3 assists. In 2013–14, he played 27 games, averaging 4.6 points, 3.6 rebounds and 1.0 assists per game. Following the season, Inglis commented on the experience of playing basketball in France, "My first year on a professional team was great. Even though my team dropped down to the second league, I had a good year. I played against good players. It was a great experience for me."

=== Milwaukee Bucks (2014–2016) ===
On June 26, 2014, Inglis was selected with the 31st overall pick in the 2014 NBA draft by the Milwaukee Bucks. Due to a broken foot he suffered during a pre-draft workout with the Oklahoma City Thunder, he sat out the 2014 NBA Summer League. After the event, Inglis said that Milwaukee would become "one of the destinations" for French Guianese immigrants in the United States. He was also compared with Kevin Séraphin after becoming just the second French Guianese player to be selected in the NBA draft. On August 26, 2014, he signed with the Bucks. Following a CT scan performed in mid-October, Inglis was ruled out for a further six weeks after it was revealed his fractured right foot was not healing properly. Inglis said, "I don't know if they messed up my surgery back in June, but something happened. I'm still not healthy." He was later ruled out for the rest of the 2014–15 season on January 5, 2015, after he underwent successful surgery on his ankle.

In July 2015, Inglis joined the Bucks for the 2015 NBA Summer League where he averaged 3.8 points and 2.5 rebounds in four games, ending what was a successful first outing for Inglis with the Bucks. He made his long-awaited debut for the Bucks in the team's season opener against the New York Knicks on October 28, recording 3 points and 4 rebounds in a 122–97 loss. On November 22, 2015, using the flexible assignment rule, the Bucks assigned Inglis to the Canton Charge, the D-League affiliate of the Cleveland Cavaliers. On December 5, he was recalled by the Bucks. On January 16, 2016, using the flexible assignment rule again, the Bucks assigned Inglis to the Westchester Knicks, the D-League affiliate of the New York Knicks. On February 29, he was recalled by the Bucks after averaging 9.9 points, 4.9 rebounds, 1.7 assists, 1.4 steals and 21.4 minutes in 13 games for Westchester. On June 29, 2016, he was waived by the Bucks.

In July 2016, Inglis joined the New Orleans Pelicans for the 2016 NBA Summer League. On October 11, 2016, he signed with the New York Knicks. He was waived by the Knicks ten days later.

=== Westchester Knicks (2016–2017) ===
On October 31, 2016, Inglis was acquired by the Westchester Knicks of the NBA Development League as an affiliate player of the New York Knicks.

=== SIG Strasbourg (2017–2018) ===
On December 29, 2017, Inglis signed with SIG Strasbourg of the French LNB Pro A. He averaged 6.8 points and 3.1 rebounds per game on the season.

=== Limoges CSP (2018–2019) ===
On October 2, 2018, Inglis signed with Limoges CSP.

=== Return to SIG Strasbourg (2019–2020) ===
On July 5, 2019, after a season with Limoges, he has signed a one-year deal with his old team SIG Strasbourg. Inglis averaged 11 points, 5.4 rebounds and 3 assists per game in Jeep Elite.

=== AS Monaco (2020–2021) ===
On July 27, 2020, he has signed with AS Monaco of the LNB Pro A.

=== Bilbao Basket (2021–2022) ===
On November 16, 2021, he has signed with Bilbao Basket of the Liga ACB.

=== Gran Canaria (2022–2023) ===
On July 24, 2022, he signed with Gran Canaria of the Spanish Liga ACB.

=== Valencia (2023–2024) ===
On July 7, 2023, Inglis signed a two-year contract with Valencia. On June 7, 2024, the Spanish club opted out of their mutual contract. In a total of 70 games, Inglis averaged 7.7 points, 5.1 rebounds and 2 assists per contest.

=== Yokohama B-Corsairs (2024–2026) ===
On September 1, 2024, Inglis signed with Yokohama B-Corsairs of the B.League.

=== Bahçeşehir Koleji (2026–present) ===
On July 1, 2026, he signed with Bahçeşehir Koleji of the Basketbol Süper Ligi (BSL).

== Career statistics ==
Legend
GP	Games played	GS	Games started	MPG	Minutes per game
FG%	Field-goal percentage	3P%	3-point field-goal percentage	FT%	Free-throw percentage
RPG	Rebounds per game	APG	Assists per game	SPG	Steals per game
BPG	Blocks per game	PPG	Points per game	PIR	Performance index rating
**Bold**	Career high

=== NBA ===
Year	Team	GP	GS	MPG	FG%	3P%	FT%	RPG	APG	SPG	BPG	PPG
2015–16	Milwaukee	20	1	7.8	.351	.231	.875	1.6	.5	.3	.2	1.8
Career		20	1	7.8	.351	.231	.875	1.6	.5	.3	.2	1.8

=== EuroLeague ===
Year	Team	GP	GS	MPG	FG%	3P%	FT%	RPG	APG	SPG	BPG	PPG	PIR
2023–24	Valencia	32	23	20.5	.507	.280	.710	4.7	1.7	.7	.2	8.2	9.6
Career		32	23	20.5	.507	.280	.710	4.7	1.7	.7	.2	8.2	9.6

== National team career ==
Inglis first played for the France junior national team at the 2010 FIBA Europe Under-16 Championship, averaging 4.5 points and 5.0 rebounds in 8 games as his team finished sixth place in the competition. Inglis returned to international play at the 2011 FIBA Europe Under-16 Championship, with per-game averages of 14.9 points, 7.8 rebounds, 1.4 assists and 1.6 blocks. He later appeared at the 2012 FIBA Under-17 World Championship, averaging 10.9 points, 7.7 rebounds and 2.4 assists. Inglis also played for France at the 2013 FIBA Europe Under-18 Championship where he averaged 11.8 points, 7.4 rebounds and 3.9 assists per game.
