= Diamantakos =

Diamantakos (Greek: Διαμαντάκος) is a Greek surname. Notable people with the surname include:

- Dimitrios Diamantakos (born 1978), Greek footballer
- Georgios Diamantakos (born 1995), Greek basketball player
