= Boris Tišma =

Croatian basketball player

No. 17 – CB Estudiantes
- Position: Small forward
- League: Primera FEB

Personal information
- Born: 20 February 2002 (age 24) Zagreb, Croatia
- Listed height: 2.05 m (6 ft 9 in)
- Listed weight: 93 kg (205 lb)

Career history
- 2020–2021: Real Madrid
- 2021: →Real Betis
- 2021–2022: Studentski centar
- 2022–2025: Split
- 2025–2026: Zadar
- 2026–present: CB Estudiantes

Career highlights
- Supercopa de España (2020); Croatian Cup winner (2025)
Medals
Men's basketball
Representing Croatia
European U-16 Championship
Gold medal – first place	2018 Serbia	U-16 Team

Boris Tišma (born 20 February 2002) is a Croatian professional basketball player for CB Estudiantes of the Spanish Primera FEB. He was committed to play for the Washington Huskies in the upcoming NCAA season.

== Early life and youth career ==
Tišma grew up playing basketball for Croatian club Dubrava. In 2015, he signed with Real Madrid in Spain and joined its youth academy. He chose Real Madrid over offers from many other clubs, including Cedevita. Tišma learned to speak Spanish after a few months at Real Madrid, with teammate Luka Dončić helping him adjust.

== Professional career ==
On 12 January 2020, Tišma made his professional debut for Real Madrid at the age of 17 years and 11 months. He played 44 seconds in an 87–72 win over Estudiantes in the Liga ACB. On 8 March, Tišma scored his first points, recording two in a 92–70 victory over Zaragoza.

In February, 2021, Tišma was loaned to Real Betis for the rest of the season. Following the 2020–21 season Tišma declared for the 2021 NBA draft.

On 7 July 2021, Tišma signed a multi-year deal with KK Studentski centar (later SC Derby) of the Prva A Liga and the ABA League. On July 19, 2021, he withdrawn his name from consideration for the 2021 NBA draft.

In December, 2022, Tišma moved to Split signing a contract to last until 2025.

== College career ==
On June 18, 2026, Tišma committed to play college basketball for the Washington Huskies.

== National team career ==
Tišma represented Croatia at the 2017 FIBA U16 European Championship in Podgorica, where his team finished in fourth place. He won a gold medal at the 2018 FIBA U16 European Championship in Novi Sad and was named to the all-tournament team after averaging 18 points, five rebounds and 2.7 assists per game. He led all scorers with 24 points in a 71–70 win over Spain in the final.

== Personal life ==
Both of Tišma's parents, Danijela (née Bakić) and Miodrag Tišma, are former basketball players.
