= Saint-Quentin Basket-Ball =

Basketball club in Saint-Quentin, France

Saint-Quentin
- Nickname: SQBB
- Leagues: LNB Élite
- Founded: 1973; 53 years ago
- Arena: Palais des Sports Pierre Ratte
- Capacity: 3,800
- Location: Saint-Quentin, France
- President: Thomas Carlier
- Head coach: Raphaël Pascual
- Team captain: Karvel Anderson
- 2025–26 position: 15th
- Website: sqbb.fr
Home	Away

Saint-Quentin Basket-Ball, commonly known as Saint-Quentin BB, is a French professional basketball club, based in the commune of Saint-Quentin, in the department of Aisne. The team spent much of its history, and is currently in the LNB Élite, the top-tier men's professional basketball league in France. Although they were relegated at the end of the most recent 2025–26 season to the second tier, after Monaco were excluded, Saint-Quentin returned to take their place for the 2026–27 season.

== History ==
Saint-Quentin BB was founded in 1973 from the merger of the Amicale Jumentier and Union sportive des Cheminots. The new club disputes the regional championship Excellence. In 1982, became a new merger between Saint-Quentin BB and Foyer laïque d'Harly.

In 1988, Saint-Quentin BB accessed by 1A (now Pro A). The club then competed with the best teams in the league and finished fifth. In 1990 the club qualifies for the FIBA Korać Cup of the next season. They compete in 1991 with a home victory over the Greek powerhouse of Panathinaikos, but an away defeat.

In 1993, following financial difficulties, Saint-Quentin relegated to National 4 and briefly found Pro B in 2000 (back down the following year) only to return in 2001 until 2009. The team regularly attended the Playoffs, losing in the semifinals in 2006 (opposite Entente Orléanaise) and 2007 (facing Quimper). In 2009, SQBB was relegated to the Men's National 1 league (NM1).

In the 2011-2012 season, SQBB won the National Basketball 1 title and was promoted to the LNB Pro B league for the 2012-2013 season. In the 2022-23 season, SQBB won the Pro B title and was promoted to the LNB Élite league for the 2023-24 season, its first season in the elite league in 31 years.

== Players ==
=== Current roster ===
Note: Flags indicate national team eligibility at FIBA-sanctioned events. Players may hold other non-FIBA nationalities not displayed.

Saint-Quentin Basket-Ball roster
Players
Coaches

Pos.	No.	Nat.	Name	Ht.	Age
PF	00	(Democratic Republic of the Congo)	Munanga, Shekinah	2.02 m (6 ft 8 in)	28 – 18 December 1997
SF	0	(United States)	Cleveland, Matthew	2.01 m (6 ft 7 in)	24 – 15 September 2002
PG	1	(United States)	Neal, Erick	1.78 m (5 ft 10 in)	31 – 15 March 1995
SG	3	(United States)	Anderson, Karvel (C)	1.88 m (6 ft 2 in)	35 – 3 June 1991
F/C	5	(United States)	Krubally, Ousman	2.02 m (6 ft 8 in)	38 – 13 March 1988
SG	9	(United States)	Kinsey, Taevion	1.96 m (6 ft 5 in)	26 – 10 March 2000
F	30	(France)	Rigot, Paul	2.03 m (6 ft 8 in)	31 – 10 February 1995
C	31	(France)	Gavrilovic, Alexandre	2.08 m (6 ft 10 in)	34 – 20 November 1991
G/F	33	(France)	Toupane, Axel	2.01 m (6 ft 7 in)	34 – 23 July 1992
PG	44	(France)	Brena-Chemille, Aurèle	1.92 m (6 ft 4 in)	22 – 14 April 2004
SF	77	(Ivory Coast) (France)	Dally, Jean Philippe	2.00 m (6 ft 7 in)	30 – 8 March 1996

Head coach

- (France) Raphaël Pascual

Assistant coach(es)

- (France) Alvaro Marsán

Legend

- (C) Team captain
- Injured

- Roster
Updated: November 8, 2026

=== Depth chart ===
Pos.	Starting 5	Bench 1	Bench 2
C	Alexandre Gavrilovic	Ousman Krubally
PF	Shekinah Munanga	Paul Rigot
SF	Matthew Cleveland	Jean Philippe Dally	Axel Toupane
SG	Karvel Anderson	Taevion Kinsey
PG	Erick Neal	Aurèle Brena-Chemille

== Notable players ==
=== Retired numbers ===
Saint-Quentin Basket-Ball retired numbers
No	Player	Position	Tenure
25	Hugo Besson	G	2020–2021
7	Benoît Gilet	G	2017–2023
