= Jean Philippe Dally =

French–Ivorian professional basketball player

Jean-Philippe Dally
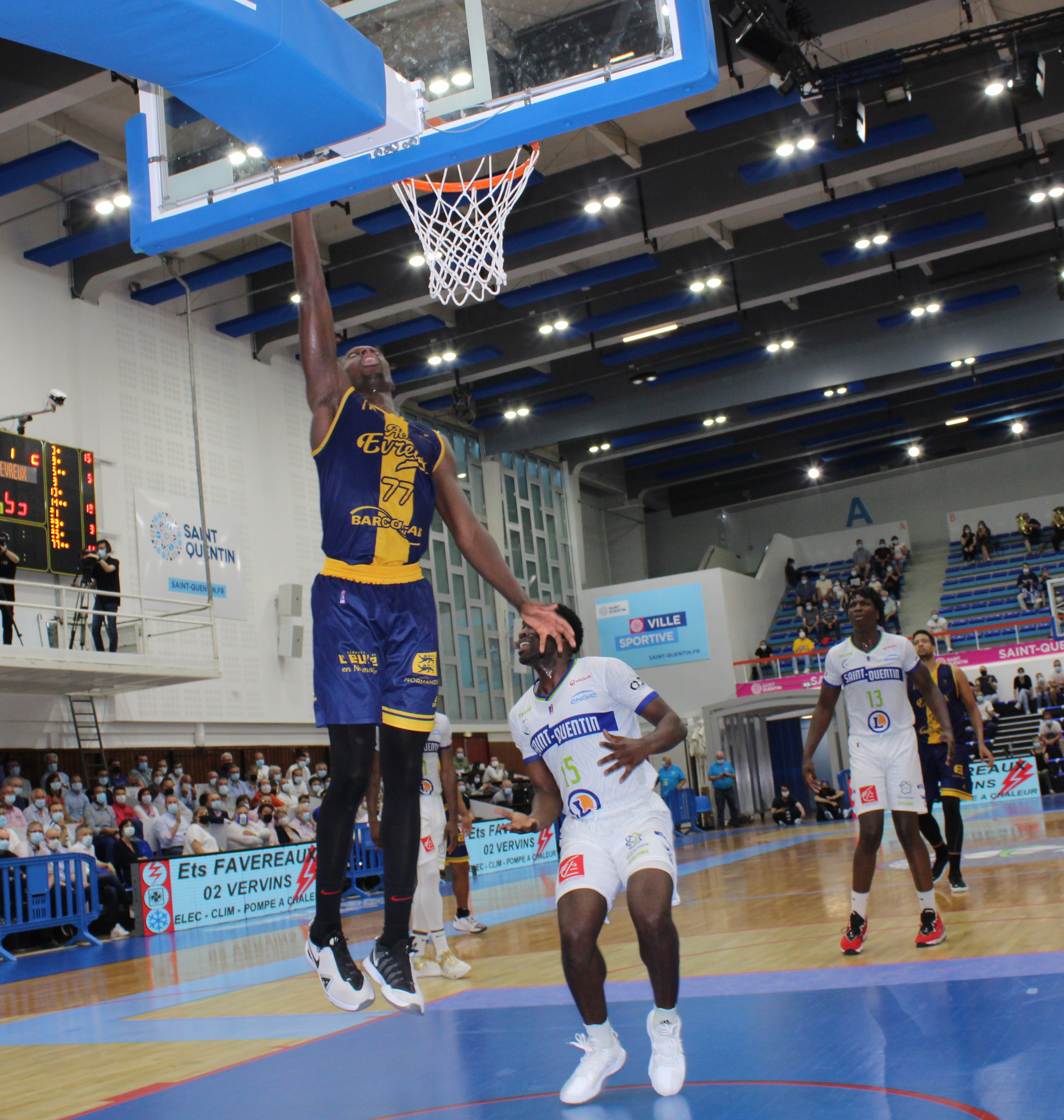

No. 77 – Saint-Quentin
- Position: Small forward
- League: LNB Élite

Personal information
- Born: 8 March 1996 (age 30) Orléans, France
- Listed height: 1.99 m (6 ft 6 in)

Career information
- Playing career: 2014–present

Career history
- 2014–2016: Le Mans (youth)
- 2016–2017: JDA Dijon
- 2017–2019: Orléans Loiret
- 2022–2024: Châlons-Reims
- 2024–2025: JDA Dijon
- 2025–present: Saint-Quentin

Jean-Philippe Dally (born 8 March 1996) is a French–Ivorian professional basketball player for Saint-Quentin of the LNB Élite. In international tournaments, he represents the Ivory Coast national team.

== Early life ==
Dally was born in Orléans, France, on 8 March 1996, and holds both French and Ivorian nationality.

== Professional career ==
Dally came through the youth (Espoirs) system at Le Mans and received his first senior minutes with the club in 2014–15.

He had a first stint at JDA Dijon in 2016–17, then established himself in the French professional leagues, including a spell with Champagne Basket (2022–2024).

On 5 July 2024, Dijon announced that Dally was returning to the club for the 2024–25 season in Betclic Élite. After one season back with Dijon, he signed a two-year deal with Saint-Quentin Basket-Ball on 7 June 2025.

== National team career ==
Originally a France youth international, Dally later committed to Côte d'Ivoire at senior level. He was part of the Ivorian national team for the FIBA Olympic Qualifying Tournament in 2024 and the 2025 AfroBasket in Angola. On 16 August 2025, he came off the bench to score a team-high 18 points and made the decisive put-back at the buzzer to beat Cape Verde 82–81 in the AfroBasket group phase.

== Playing style ==
A 1.99 m (6 ft 6 in) wing, Dally has been deployed at both the small forward and power forward spots and is noted in French media for his versatility and defensive work rate.
