= Brano Đukanović =

Serbian basketball player

No. 10 – Zlatibor
- Position: Shooting guard
- League: Basketball League of Serbia

Personal information
- Born: March 21, 1995 (age 31) Belgrade, Serbia
- Listed height: 1.96 m (6 ft 5 in)
- Listed weight: 87 kg (192 lb)

Career information
- NBA draft: 2017: undrafted
- Playing career: 2013–present

Career history
- 2013–2015: Crvena zvezda
- 2013–2015: → FMP
- 2015–2017: Metalac Valjevo
- 2017–2018: Força Lleida
- 2018–2020: TAU Castelló
- 2020–2021: BC Kalev
- 2021: Atomerőmű SE
- 2022: Club Ourense Baloncesto
- 2022–present: Zlatibor
Medals
Men's basketball
Representing Serbia
U18 European Championship
Bronze medal – third place	2012 Lithuania/Latvia	U18 Team

Brano Đukanović (Serbian Cyrillic: Брано Ђукановић, born 21 March 1995) is a Serbian professional basketball player for Zlatibor.

== Professional career ==
Đukanović grew up with Crvena zvezda youth teams and signed his first professional contract with the club in April 2013. He never played for Zvezda's first team. He was loaned to FMP where he played from 2013 to 2015. From 2015 to 2017 he played with Metalac Valjevo. In August 2017, he signed with Spanish club Força Lleida of the LEB Oro. He finished that season as top 10 scorer. 2018-2020 he played two great seasons in Tau Castellon. 2020-2021 he played in Kalev Cramo VTB league.

In 2021, Đukanović signed with Atomerőmű SE of the Hungarian league and averaged 10.5 points and 1.8 rebounds per game. On January 31, 2022, he signed with Club Ourense Baloncesto of the Spanish LEB Plata.

== National team career ==
He played for national Serbian team U16 . With Serbia's junior national team, Đukanović won the bronze medal at the 2012 FIBA Europe Under-18 Championship. He also played at the 2011 FIBA Europe Under-16 Championship and the 2013 FIBA Europe Under-18 Championship.
