= Arthur Rozenfeld =

French basketball player (born 1995)

Arthur Rozenfeld ארתור רוזנפלד
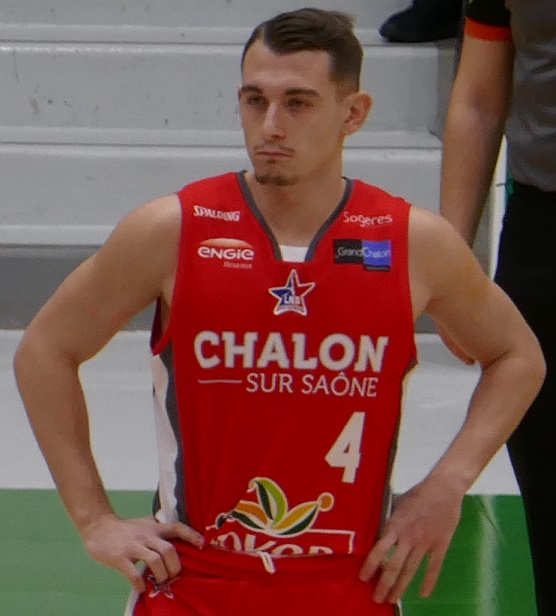
- Rozenfeld in 2017

No. 4 – Maccabi Haifa
- Position: Point guard
- League: Liga Leumit

Personal information
- Born: 8 February 1995 (age 31) Bron, France
- Listed height: 1.83 m (6 ft 0 in)
- Listed weight: 80 kg (176 lb)

Career information
- NBA draft: 2017: undrafted
- Playing career: 2012–present

Career history
- 2012–2015: ASVEL
- 2015–2016: SOMB
- 2016–2017: Chorale Roanne
- 2017–2018: Élan Chalon
- 2018–2019: JL Bourg
- 2019–2020: Vichy-Clermont Métropole Basket
- 2020–2021: Maccabi Ashdod
- 2022–2023: Hapoel Gilboa Galil
- 2023: Ironi Ness Ziona
- 2024–2025: Ironi Nahariya
- 2026–present: Maccabi Haifa

Arthur Rozenfeld (Hebrew: ארתור רוזנפלד; born 8 February 1995) is a French-Israeli professional basketball player who plays point guard for Maccabi Haifa of the Liga Leumit.

== Early life ==
Rozenfeld was born in Bron, France. He is 6 ft 0 in (183 cm) tall, and weighs 182 pounds (83 kg).

== Professional career ==
On 22 July 2015, Rozenfeld signed with the French team Boulogne, where he was Garrett Sim's replacement. He averaged 8.1 points and 3.9 assists per game, in 2015–16.

On 22 June 2016, Rozenfeld signed with the French team Chorale Roanne in the LNB Pro A to become titular leader, averaged 14.5 points and 4.5 assists (9th-best in the league) per game with a .919 free throw percentage (third-best in the league), and was selected most improved of Pro B at the end of season.

He joined the French team Élan Chalon on 30 May 2017. In June 2018, he quit the club. Rozenfeld signed with the French team JL Bourg in the LNB Pro A for a one-year deal.

On 1 July 2019, he signed with the French team Vichy-Clermont Métropole Basket of LNB Pro B. He averaged 7.8 points and 3.4 assists per game.

On 5 December 2022, Rozenfeld signed with Hapoel Gilboa Galil of the Israeli Basketball Premier League.

== International play ==
Rozenfeld played for Team France in the 2011 FIBA Europe Under-16 Championship, 2012 FIBA Under-17 World Championship, 2013 U18 Euro Championship A, 2014 U20 Euro Championship A, and 2015 FIBA Europe Under-20 Championship.
