= Michail Liapis =

Greek basketball player (born 1995)

Iraklis Thessaloniki
- Position: Shooting guard / point guard
- League: Greek Basketball League; FIBA Europe Cup

Personal information
- Born: 11 March 1995 (age 31) Thessaloniki, Greece
- Listed height: 6 ft 3.75 in (1.92 m)
- Listed weight: 185 lb (84 kg)

Career information
- Playing career: 2011–present

Career history
- 2011–2016: PAOK Thessaloniki
- 2016–2017: Kolossos Rodou
- 2017–2018: Politehnica Iași
- 2018: Grindavík
- 2018–2019: Iraklis Thessaloniki
- 2019–2020: Culleredo
- 2020–2021: Kolossos Rodou
- 2021–2022: Charilaos Trikoupis
- 2022–2023: Iraklis Thessaloniki
- 2023–2024: Esperos Lamias
- 2024–2025: Iraklis Thessaloniki
- 2025–2026: Karditsa
- 2026–present: Iraklis Thessaloniki

Michail Liapis (alternate spelling: Michalis) (Greek: Μιχάλης Λιάπης; born 11 March 1995) is a Greek professional basketball player for Iraklis Thessaloniki of the Greek Basketball League (GBL) and the FIBA Europe Cup. He is a 1.92 m (6'3¾") tall point guard and shooting guard.

== Professional career ==
After playing with the youth clubs of PAOK, Liapis began his pro career in 2011, with the senior men's team of P.A.O.K., in the Greek Basketball League. After 5 years, he decided to leave the club and he joined Kolossos Rodou. On 5 July 2017 Liapis joined Politehnica Iași.

In August 2018, Liapis signed with Grindavík of the Icelandic Úrvalsdeild karla. He was released in October 2018 after appearing in two games where he averaged 6.5 points, 4.5 rebounds and 2.0 assists.

He spent the 2019–20 campaign in Spain with KFC Culleredo. Liapis returned to Kolossos Rodou on 23 September 2020. In 16 games, he averaged 1.2 points, playing around 5 minutes per contest. On 6 August 2021 Liapis signed with Greek Elite League club Charilaos Trikoupis Messolonghi. On July 11, 2024, Liapis signed with Iraklis Thessaloniki.

== Greek national team ==
Liapis has been a member of the Greek junior national teams. With the junior national teams of Greece, he played at the 2011 FIBA Europe Under-16 Championship, the 2013 FIBA Europe Under-18 Championship, the 2014 FIBA Europe Under-20 Championship, and the 2015 FIBA Europe Under-20 Championship.
