= CS Politehnica Iași (men's basketball) =

- Nickname: Alb-Albaștrii (The White and Blues); The Studs
- Leagues: Liga Națională
- Founded: 1967; 58 years ago
- History: CS Politehnica Iași (1967–present)
- Arena: Polyvalent Hall
- Capacity: 1,500
- Location: Iași, Romania
- Team colors: White, Blue
- President: Gabriel Toma, Dorin Șchiopu
- Head coach: Branko Jorović
- Website: Official website
Home	Away

CS Politehnica Iași is a professional basketball club, based in Iași, Romania. The club competes in the Liga Națională.

== History ==
The club was founded in 1967 and the best performance of the white and blues was in the 1997-1998 season when they won the bronze medal in the Liga Națională. The team relegated at the end of the 2010-2011 season in the second league.

In the season 2016-2017 the team finally qualified for the Liga I final four, and in the final they managed to get the second place, which guaranteed their access to the 2017–18 Liga Națională.

== Current roster ==
Note: Flags indicate national team eligibility at FIBA-sanctioned events. Players may hold other non-FIBA nationalities not displayed.

CS Politehnica Iași roster
Players
Coaches

Pos.	No.	Nat.	Name	Ht.
PG		(Georgia (country))	Tsintsadze, Giorgi (C)	1.92 m (6 ft 4 in)
G		(Romania)	Nuna, Matei	1.90 m (6 ft 3 in)
F		(Romania)	Amarghioalei, Constantin	1.96 m (6 ft 5 in)
G		(United States)	Taylor, Tayloe	1.88 m (6 ft 2 in)
G		(Greece)	Liapis, Michail	1.92 m (6 ft 4 in)
SF		(Croatia)	Cvetanović, Siniša	2.05 m (6 ft 9 in)
F		(Romania)	Vatră, Răzvan	1.85 m (6 ft 1 in)
F		(Romania)	Buiciuc, Sebastian	1.85 m (6 ft 1 in)
PF		(Romania)	Șolopa, Vlad	2.02 m (6 ft 8 in)
G		(United States)	Jackson, Jalen	1.97 m (6 ft 6 in)
G/F		(Romania)	Popa, Florin.	1.95 m (6 ft 5 in)
PF		(Romania)	Calenic, Andrei	2.03 m (6 ft 8 in)

Head coach

- (Serbia) Branko Jorović

Assistant coach(es)

- (Romania) Constantin Pintilie

Legend

- (C) Team captain
- Injured

- Roster
Updated: 26 September 2017
