= Alexis Spyridonidis =

Greek basketball player

Alexis Spyridonidis Αλέξης Σπυριδωνίδης
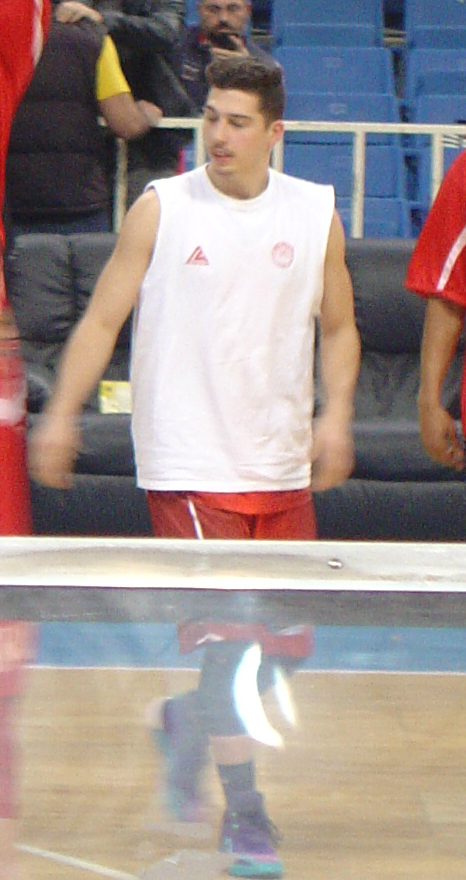
- Spyridonidis with Nea Kifissia in 2016

Aias Evosmou
- Position: Point guard
- League: Greek A2 Basket League

Personal information
- Born: February 3, 1995 (age 31) Nikaia, Athens, Greece
- Listed height: 6 ft 2.75 in (1.90 m)
- Listed weight: 175 lb (79 kg)

Career information
- Playing career: 2012–present

Career history
- 2012–2013: Ilysiakos
- 2013–2015: KAOD
- 2015–2016: Nea Kifissia
- 2016–2018: Koroivos Amaliadas
- 2018–2019: Holargos
- 2019: Clavijo
- 2019–2020: Rethymno Cretan Kings
- 2020–2021: Bisons Loimaa
- 2021–2022: ASK Karditsa
- 2022–2023: Mykonos
- 2023–present: Aias Evosmou

Career highlights
- Greek 2nd Division champion (2022); Finish Second Division champion (2021)

Alexandros "Alexis" Spyridonidis (Greek: Αλέξανδρος "Αλέξης" Σπυριδωνίδης; born February 3, 1995) is a Greek professional basketball player for Aias Evosmou of the Greek A2 Basket League.

== Professional career ==
Spyridonidis began his professional career with the Greek Basket League club Ilysiakos in 2012. In 2013, he signed a four-year contract with KAOD. After the team's relegation to the third division, Spyridonidis moved again to Nea Kifissia.

On September 9, 2016, he joined Koroivos Amaliadas of the Greek Basket League. After spending two years with Koroivos and due to the team's relegation, Spyridonidis left the club and joined the newly promoted to the Greek Basket League club Holargos.

Spyridonidis spent the 2019–20 season with Rethymno Cretan Kings, averaging 1.9 points per game. On October 11, 2020, he joined for Bisons Loimaa of the Finnish Koripallon I-divisioona. With Bisons, he won the Koripallon I-divisioona championship.

== Greek national team ==
With the junior national teams of Greece, Spyridonidis played at the following tournaments: the 2011 FIBA Europe Under-16 Championship, the 2013 FIBA Europe Under-18 Championship and the 2014 FIBA Europe Under-20 Championship.
