= Georgios Diamantakos =

Greek basketball player

Georgios Diamantakos Γιώργος Διαμαντάκος
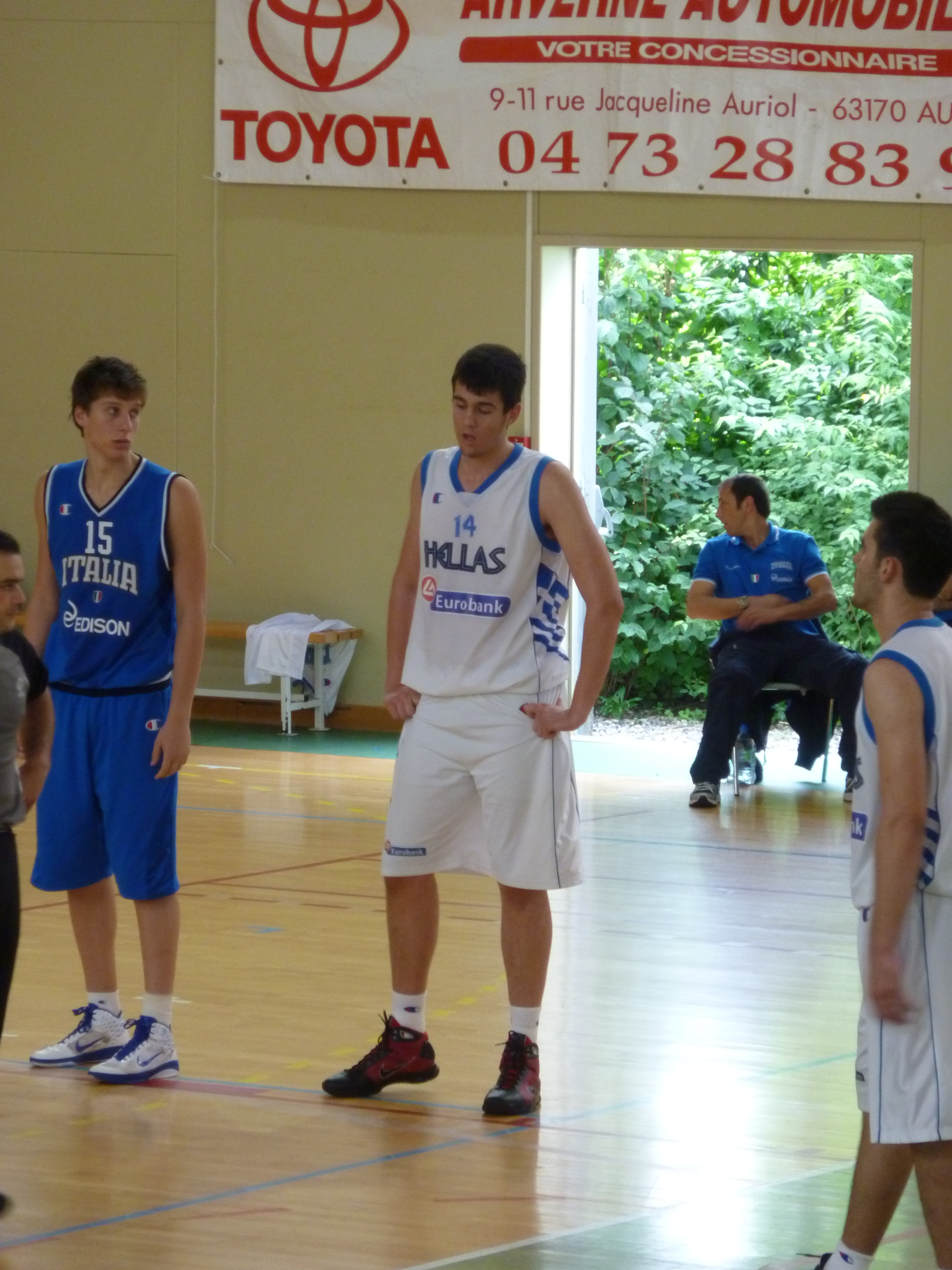
- Georgios Diamantakos in 2011.

Vikos Falcons
- Position: Center
- League: Greek Elite League

Personal information
- Born: January 14, 1995 (age 31) Magoula, Sparti, Greece
- Listed height: 7 ft 1 in (2.16 m)
- Listed weight: 275 lb (125 kg)

Career information
- Playing career: 2012–present

Career history
- 2012–2015: Panathinaikos
- 2015–2016: Darüşşafaka
- 2015: → Nea Kifissia
- 2015–2016: → Spartak Pleven
- 2016: → GKK Šibenik
- 2016–2017: Apollon Patras
- 2017–2018: GSL Faros
- 2018–2020: Ifaistos Limnou
- 2020–2022: Apollon Patras
- 2022–2024: Mykonos
- 2024–2025: Psychiko
- 2025–present: Vikos Falcons

Career highlights
- 2× Greek League champion (2013, 2014); 3× Greek Cup winner (2013–2015); Greek 2nd Division champion (2021)

Georgios Diamantakos (alternate spellings: Giorgos, George) (Greek: Γιώργος Διαμαντάκος; born January 14, 1995) is a Greek professional basketball player for Vikos Falcons Ioannina of the Greek Elite League. He is a right-handed 7 ft. 1 in. (2.16 m) tall center.

== Professional career ==
Diamantakos began his pro career in Greece in 2012, when he played in the Greek League with Panathinaikos, in a game against Peristeri.

In July 2015, he signed with the Turkish club Darüşşafaka, of the Turkish Super League, and was subsequently loaned by them to the Greek club Nea Kifissia. Later, he played in a game with the Bulgarian club, Spartak Pleven, in November 2015. He was then loaned to the Croatian club GKK Šibenik, of the Croatian A-1 League.

In July 2016, he signed with Apollon Patras in Greece.

On August 10, 2017, he joined G.S. Faros Larissas of the Greek Basket League. In summer 2018, Diamantakos followed the team's relocation to the island of Lemnos, under the name Ifaistos Limnou. On July 22, 2019, he renewed his contract with Ifaistos through 2021.

During the 2020–2021 season with Apollon Patras, Diamantakos averaged a career-high of 12.3 points, 8.2 rebounds, and 1.4 blocks per contest, in 16 games total. The club won the Greek 2nd division title and got promoted to the Greek Basket League. During the 2021-22 campaign, in 16 games, he averaged 5 points, 2.9 rebounds and 0.4 blocks, playing around 12 minutes per contest.

In August 2022, Diamantakos signed with ambitious 3rd division club AO Mykonou, in a rather surprising move.

== National team career ==
Diamantakos was a member of the junior national teams of Greece. With Greece's junior national teams, he played at the 2011 FIBA Europe Under-16 Championship, the 2013 FIBA Europe Under-18 Championship, and the 2014 FIBA Europe Under-20 Championship.

== Awards and honors ==
=== Club career ===
- 2× Greek League Champion: (2013, 2014)
- 3× Greek Cup Winner: (2013, 2014, 2015)
- 1x Greek A2 Basket League Champion: (2021)
