= Nikola Rebić =

Serbian basketball player (born 1995)

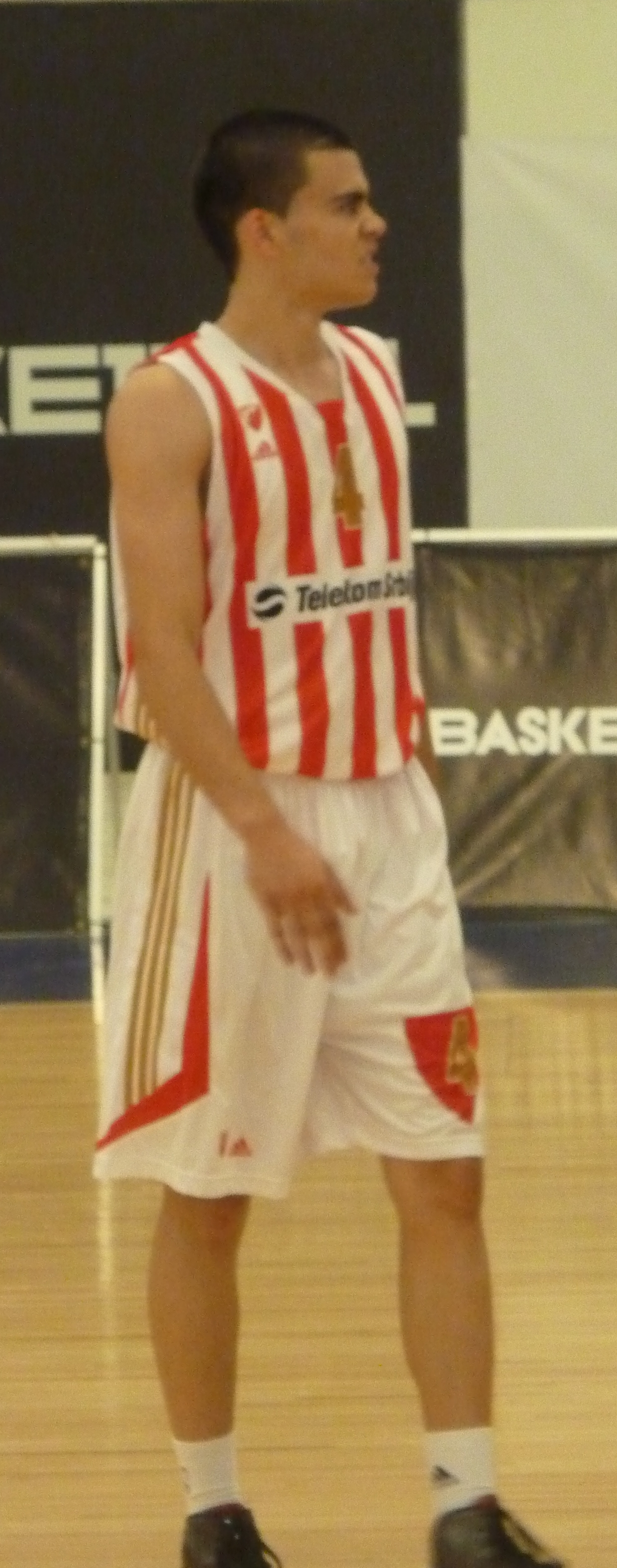
- Rebić with Crvena zvezda junior team in May 2013.

Free agent
- Position: Point guard

Personal information
- Born: 22 January 1995 (age 31) Belgrade, Serbia, FR Yugoslavia
- Listed height: 1.88 m (6 ft 2 in)
- Listed weight: 176 lb (80 kg)

Career information
- NBA draft: 2017: undrafted
- Playing career: 2012–present

Career history
- 2012–2013: Radnički FMP
- 2013–2016: Crvena zvezda
- 2016–2018: Mega Leks
- 2018: Bilbao Basket
- 2018–2019: Mornar Bar
- 2019–2020: BC Enisey
- 2020: Monaco
- 2020–2021: Nanterre 92
- 2021–2022: Mitteldeutscher
- 2022: Avtodor
- 2022–2023: Nizhny Novgorod
- 2023–2024: Samara
- 2024–2025: Büyükçekmece Basketbol
- 2025–2026: Spartak Subotica

Career highlights
- 2× ABA League champion (2015, 2016); 3× Serbian League champion (2015, 2016, 2026); 2× Serbian Cup winner (2014, 2015)
Medals
Men's basketball
Representing Serbia
U20 European Championship
Bronze medal – third place	2014 Greece	Team
Gold medal – first place	2015 Italy	Team
U18 European Championship
Bronze medal – third place	2012 Lithuania/Latvia	Team

Nikola Rebić (Serbian Cyrillic: Никола Ребић, born 22 January 1995) is a Serbian professional basketball player who last played for Spartak Subotica of the Serbian League (KLS) and the ABA League. Standing at 6 ft 2 in (1.88 m), he plays at the point guard position.

== Professional career ==
Nikola grew up with Crvena zvezda youth team and signed his first professional contract with the club in February 2013. He stayed in the team until the end of 2015–16 season.

He signed a contract for the 2016–17 season with the Serbian team Mega Basket. He stayed with them for one and a half season. In February 2018, he signed a contract with the Spanish team Bilbao Basket until the end of season.

In September 2018, he signed a contract with the Montenegrin club Mornar Bar.

On 11 September 2019 he signed with BC Enisey of the VTB United League.

On 26 October 2020 he signed with Monaco of the LNB Pro A.

On 24 December 2020 he signed with Nanterre 92 of the LNB Pro A.

On 4 July 2021 he signed with Mitteldeutscher BC of the German Basketball Bundesliga.

On 15 November 2022 he signed with Nizhny Novgorod of the VTB United League.

On November 26, 2024, he signed with ONVO Büyükçekmece of the Basketbol Süper Ligi (BSL).

On July 22, 2025, he signed with Spartak Subotica of the Serbian League (KLS).
