= Paul Rigot =

French basketball player

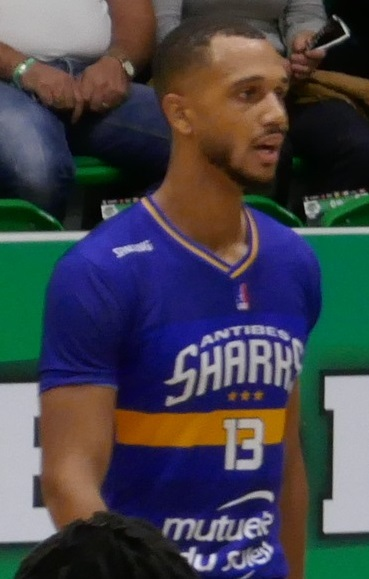

No. 30 – Saint-Quentin
- Position: Small forward / power forward
- League: LNB Élite

Personal information
- Born: February 10, 1995 (age 31) Le Mans, France
- Listed height: 2.03 m (6 ft 8 in)
- Listed weight: 98 kg (216 lb)

Career information
- College: INSEP (2012–2013)
- NBA draft: 2017: undrafted
- Playing career: 2013–present

Career history
- 2013–2014: Limoges
- 2015–2016: Orchies
- 2016–2017: Monaco
- 2017–2019: Antibes
- 2019–2020: Évreux
- 2020–2021: Gravelines-Dunkerque
- 2021–2023: ADA Blois
- 2023–2025: Évreux
- 2025–2026: Fuenlabrada
- 2026–present: Saint-Quentin

Career highlights
- French League champion (2014); Leaders Cup champion (2016)

Paul Rigot (born February 10, 1995) is a French professional basketball player for Saint-Quentin of the French LNB Élite.

== Professional career ==
In 2010, Rigot joined Centre Fédéral de Basket-ball (CFBB), as part of the INSEP program, for the most talented youth basketball players in France. After a year of development, he played with the squad in the Nationale Masculine 1 for the 2011–2012 season. At the end of the 2012–2013 season, he left INSEP.

In May 2013, Rigot worked out alongside Olivier Yao-Delon at JDA Dijon for a roster spot, but only Yao-Delon was retained by Dijon. In June 2013, he joined CSP Limoges, playing there between 2013–2015. In July 2015, Rigot signed with BC Orchies in LNB Pro B.

In August 2016, he took part with Monaco in their summer training camp, to try and obtain a contract. On September 10, 2016, Rigot signed with Monaco. In June 2017, he joined Antibes where he signed a two-year contract.

Rigot played for ALM Évreux Basket in the 2019–20 season. He averaged 12 points, 6 rebounds and 2 assists per game and was the top shooter in LNB Pro B, making 48% of his three-point attempts. On June 4, 2020, he joined Gravelines-Dunkerque.

On August 28, 2025, Rigot signed with Fuenlabrada of the Primera FEB. On August 2, 2026, Saint-Quentin announced that they have signed Rigot for the upcoming season.

On August 2, 2026, he signed with Saint-Quentin Basket-Ball of the French LNB Élite.
