= Karlo Žganec =

Croatian basketball player

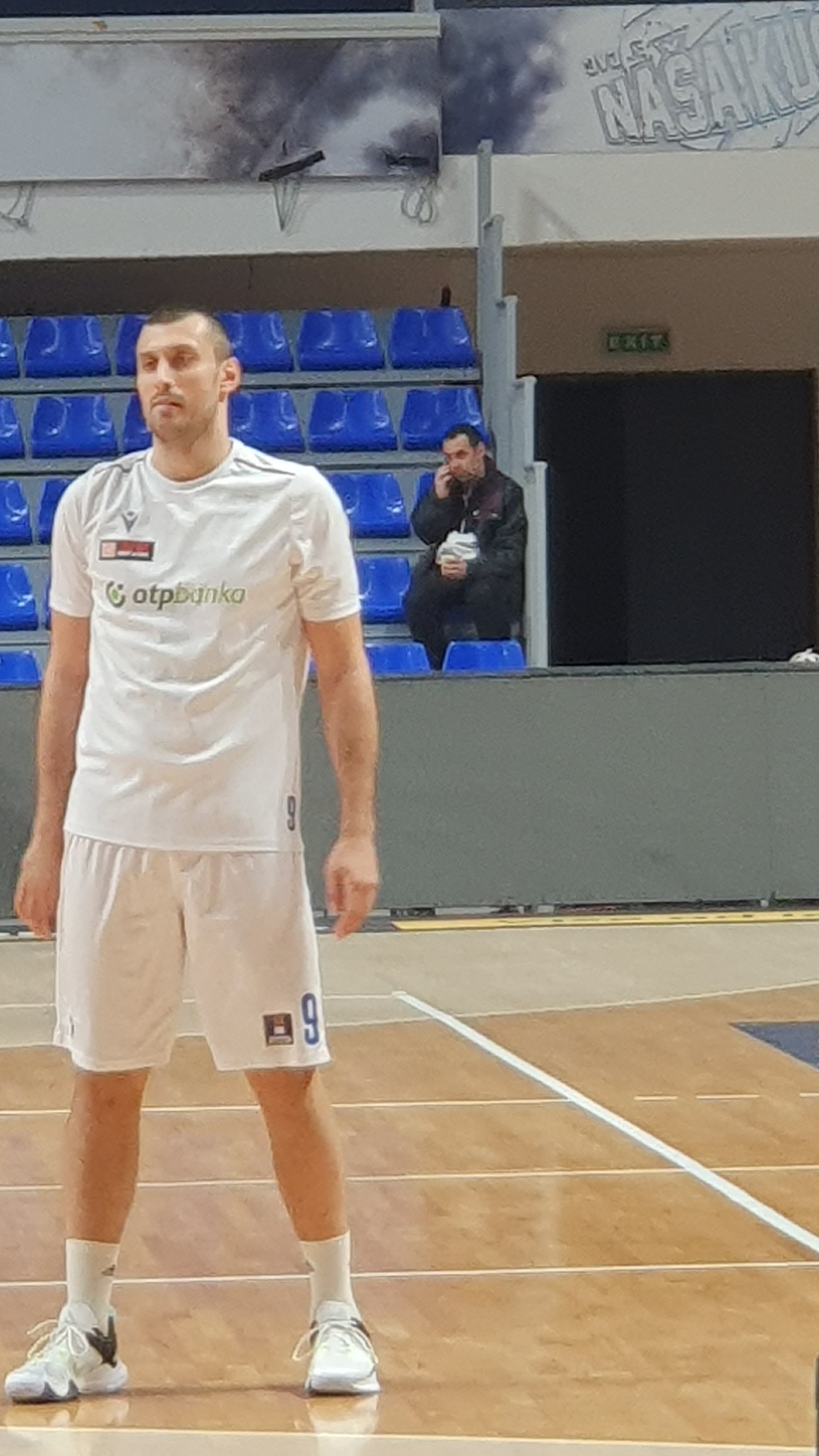

No. 9 – Široki
- Position: Power forward / center
- League: Bosnian League; ABA League

Personal information
- Born: July 25, 1995 (age 31) Zagreb, Croatia
- Listed height: 2.06 m (6 ft 9 in)
- Listed weight: 102 kg (225 lb)

Career information
- NBA draft: 2018: undrafted
- Playing career: 2012–present

Career history
- 2012–2014: Zagreb
- 2014–2019: Cedevita
- 2019–2021: U-BT Cluj-Napoca
- 2021–2022: Split
- 2022–2026: Zadar
- 2026–present: Široki

Career highlights
- 7× Croatian League champion (2015–2018, 2023–2025); 6× Croatian Cup winner (2015–2019, 2024); Stanković Cup (2018); Stanković Cup Best team (2018)
Medals
Men's basketball
Representing Croatia
FIBA Europe Under-18 Championship
Gold medal – first place	2012 Latvia/Lithuania	U-18 Team
Silver medal – second place	2013 Latvia	U-18 Team
European U-16 Championship
Gold medal – first place	2011 Czech Republic	U-16 Team

Karlo Žganec (born 25 July 1995) is a Croatian professional basketball player for Široki in the Bosnian League and the ABA League.

== Playing career ==
On 26 July 2022, Žganec signed a contract with Zadar of the Croatian League for the 2022–23 season.
