= Tomislav Gabrić =

Croatian basketball player

No. 88 – Orléans Loiret Basket
- Position: Forward
- League: Pro B

Personal information
- Born: 17 August 1995 (age 29); Oklaj, Croatia
- Listed height: 2.04 m (6 ft 8 in)
- Listed weight: 95 kg (209 lb)

Career information
- NBA draft: 2017: undrafted
- Playing career: 2011–present

Career history
- 2011–2013: Jolly Šibenik
- 2013–2015: Cibona
- 2015–2016: Metalac Farmakom
- 2016–2017: BCM U Pitesti
- 2017: Universo Treviso Basket
- 2017–2018: Ventspils
- 2018: Šibenik
- 2018–2020: Split
- 2020–2021: Astoria Bydgoszcz
- 2021: EWE Baskets Oldenburg
- 2021–2022: Élan Chalon
- 2022–2023: Kaposvári KK
- 2023–2024: Start Lublin
- 2024–present: Orléans Loiret

Career highlights
- ABA League champion (2014)
Medals
Men's basketball
Representing Croatia
World U-17 Championship
Bronze medal – third place	2012 Lithuania	U-17 Team
FIBA Europe Under-18 Championship
Gold medal – first place	2012 Latvia/Lithuania	U-18 Team
Silver medal – second place	2013 Latvia	U-18 Team
FIBA Europe Under-16 Championship
Gold medal – first place	2011 Czech Republic	U-16 Team

Tomislav Gabrić (born 17 August 1995) is a Croatian professional basketball player for Orléans Loiret of the LNB Pro B. Standing at 2.04 m (6 ft 8 1/2 in), he plays at the forward position.
