= Domagoj Bošnjak =

Croatian basketball player

Personal information
- Born: April 9, 1995 (age 31) Mostar, Bosnia and Herzegovina
- Listed height: 6 ft 6 in (1.98 m)
- Listed weight: 200 lb (91 kg)

Career information
- NBA draft: 2017: undrafted
- Playing career: 2011–present
- Position: Shooting guard / small forward

Career history
- 2011–2015: Široki
- 2014–2015: → Zadar
- 2015–2016: Zadar
- 2016–2018: Cibona
- 2018–2019: Cedevita
- 2019–2020: Rouen
- 2020: Široki

Career highlights
- Bosnian League champion (2012); 2× Bosnian Cup winner (2012, 2014); Croatian Cup winner (2019); Stanković Cup winner (2018)
Medals
Men's basketball
Representing Croatia
World U-17 Championship
Bronze medal – third place	2012 Lithuania	U-17 Team
European U-18 Championship
Silver medal – second place	2013 Latvia	U-18 Team
European U-16 Championship
Gold medal – first place	2011 Czech Republic	U-16 Team

Domagoj Bošnjak (born April 9, 1995) is a Croatian professional basketball player who last played for Široki of the Basketball Championship of Bosnia and Herzegovina and ABA League Second Division. Standing at 1.98 m he plays the shooting guard and small forward positions.

== Professional career ==
Bošnjak started his professional career with Široki during the 2011–12 season. In August 2014 Bošnjak was loaned to Zadar in a one-year deal. After signing for Zadar and spending the 2015–16 season, in August 2016 he moved to Cibona. After spending a season in Cedevita, in August 2019 he moved to Rouen of the French second-tier LNB Pro B League.

In February, 2020, Bošnjak returned to Široki competing in the Bosnian League and the ABA League Second Division.

He had a very successful career with the Croatian national basketball team youth selections winning altogether three medals in international competitions. He was selected in the 2013 FIBA Europe Under-18 Championship All-tournament team.
