= 2015 FIBA Europe Under-20 Championship =

18th edition of the FIBA Europe Under-20 Championship

2015 FIBA U20 European Championship
18th FIBA Under-20 European Basketball Championship

Tournament details
- Host country: Italy
- Dates: 7–19 July 2015
- Teams: 20
- Venues: 3 (in 2 host cities)

Final positions
- Champions: Serbia (3rd title)

Tournament statistics
- MVP: (Serbia) Marko Gudurić

Official website
- FIBA Archive

The 2015 FIBA Europe Under-20 Championship was the 18th edition of the FIBA Europe Under-20 Championship. The competition took place in Lignano Sabbiadoro and Latisana, Italy, from 7 to 19 July 2015.

== Participating teams ==
- Belgium ▲ (Runners-up, 2014 FIBA Europe Under-20 Championship Division B)
- Bosnia and Herzegovina ▲ (Winners, 2014 FIBA Europe Under-20 Championship Division B)
- Bulgaria
- Croatia
- Czech Republic
- France
- Germany
- Great Britain
- Greece
- Israel
- Italy
- Latvia
- Lithuania
- Poland
- Russia
- Serbia
- Slovenia
- Spain
- Turkey
- Ukraine ▲ (3rd place, 2014 FIBA Europe Under-20 Championship Division B)

== First round ==
In this round, the twenty teams were allocated in four groups of five teams each. The top three teams advanced to the Second Round. The last two teams of each group played in the Classification Games.

=== Group A ===
Pos	Team	Pld	W	L	PF	PA	PD	Pts	Qualification
1	France	4	3	1	261	217	+44	7 (Note: France–Belgium 72–50)	Advance to second round
2	Belgium	4	3	1	260	251	+9	7	Advance to second round
3	Italy	4	2	2	239	244	−5	6	Advance to second round
4	Croatia	4	1	3	250	271	−21	5 (Note: Croatia–Bosnia and Herzegovina 77–61)	Classification Group G
5	Bosnia and Herzegovina	4	1	3	240	267	−27	5	Classification Group H

Source: FIBA Archive
Notes:

7 July 2015
18:45

Boxscore

Bosnia and Herzegovina	51–59	Belgium
Scoring by quarter: 12–21, 11–20, 17–2, 11–16
Pts: Polutak 17, Buza 13; Rebs: Lončar, Polutak 8 Asts: Zahiragić, Lužaić 2		Pts: Lecomte 21; Rebs: Bako 11, van Vliet 8 Asts: Hemeleers, Lecomte 2

Pala Getur, Lignano Sabbiadoro – Province of Udine (ITA)
Attendance: 200
Referees: Daniel Hierrezuelo (ESP), Oliver Krause (GER), Martin Horozov (BUL)

7 July 2015
21:00

Boxscore

Croatia	50–53	Italy
Scoring by quarter: 6–16, 17–11, 10–16, 17–10
Pts: Gabrić 16; Rebs: Jukić 14, Gabrić 11; Asts: Žganec 3		Pts: Cappelletti 14, Laquintana 13; Rebs: Fontecchio 9 Asts: Cappelletti 2

Pala Getur, Lignano Sabbiadoro – Province of Udine (ITA)
Attendance: 1600
Referees: Fernando Rocha (POR), Robert Vyklický (CZE), Sergei Beliakov (RUS)

8 July 2015
16:30

Boxscore

France	72–55	Croatia
Scoring by quarter: 15–9, 21–16, 16–15, 20–15
Pts: Bouteille 21, Yabusele 16; Rebs: Yabusele 8 Asts: Duwiquet, Luwawu 3		Pts: Bošnjak 11, Ćorić 10; Rebs: Jukić 7, Perić, Božić 6 Asts: Bošnjak, Božić 2

Palasport Comunale, Lignano Sabbiadoro – Province of Udine (ITA)
Attendance: 60
Referees: Fernando Rocha (POR), Gentian Cici (ALB), Martin Horozov (BUL)

8 July 2015
21:00

Boxscore

Italy	69–73	Bosnia and Herzegovina
Scoring by quarter: 15–20, 20–13, 12–20, 22–20
Pts: Vedovato 12, Laquintana, Vencato 11; Rebs: Vencato 8, Vedovato 6 Asts: Cappelletti 3		Pts: Buza 28, Lakić 14; Rebs: Buza 10, Lakić 8 Asts: Zahiragić 7

Pala Getur, Lignano Sabbiadoro – Province of Udine (ITA)
Attendance: 1100
Referees: Robert Vyklický (CZE), Miloš Koljenšić (MNE), Zdenko Zubak (SVK)

9 July 2015
18:45

Boxscore

Bosnia and Herzegovina	55–62	France
Scoring by quarter: 21–14, 8–22, 17–13, 9–13
Pts: Lakić 16, Polutak 10; Rebs: Gačić, Karamatić, Lakić 7 Asts: Zahiragić 3		Pts: Bouteille 25, Duwiquet 12; Rebs: Kaba 6 Asts: Duwiquet 4

Pala Getur, Lignano Sabbiadoro – Province of Udine (ITA)
Attendance: 250
Referees: Sergiy Zashchuk (UKR), Marek Maliszewski (POL), Mario Majkic (SLO)

9 July 2015
21:00

Boxscore

Belgium	66–60	Italy
Scoring by quarter: 21–19, 11–18, 17–12, 17–11
Pts: Lecomte 19, Kesteloot 15; Rebs: van Vliet 10, Kesteloot 8 Asts: Hemeleers 4		Pts: Laquintana 14, Fontecchio, Zilli 10; Rebs: Akele 9, Flaccadori, Fontecchio 6 Asts: Cappelletti, Fontecchio 3

Pala Getur, Lignano Sabbiadoro – Province of Udine (ITA)
Attendance: 1500
Referees: Oskars Lucis (LAT), Ersan Kartal (TUR), Pedro Coelho (POR)

10 July 2015
18:45

Boxscore

France	72–50	Belgium
Scoring by quarter: 17–15, 19–11, 23–13, 13–11
Pts: Luwawu 17, Rozenfeld 10; Rebs: Lessort 10, Rozenfeld 7 Asts: Duwiquet 2		Pts: Kesteloot 14, Hemeleers 10; Rebs: Bako 8 Asts: Lecomte 2

Palasport Comunale, Lignano Sabbiadoro – Province of Udine (ITA)
Attendance: 120
Referees: Oskars Lucis (LAT), Oliver Krause (GER), James Alexander Boyer (AUS)

10 July 2015
21:00

Boxscore

Croatia	77–61	Bosnia and Herzegovina
Scoring by quarter: 18–16, 17–19, 24–11, 18–15
Pts: Gabrić 29, Bošnjak 17; Rebs: Ćorić 11, Božić 9 Asts: Gulam 6		Pts: Buža, Polutak 19; Rebs: Polutak 12, Buza 9 Asts: Buza 3

Palasport Comunale, Lignano Sabbiadoro – Province of Udine (ITA)
Attendance: 80
Referees: Sergiy Zashchuk (UKR), Gentian Cici (ALB), Pedro Coelho (POR)

11 July 2015
21:00

Boxscore

Italy	57–55	France
Scoring by quarter: 17–15, 13–11, 18–12, 9–17
Pts: Laquintana 15, Vencato 11; Rebs: Akele 8, Zilli 6 Asts: Laquintana, Zilli 2		Pts: Yabusele 13, Cornelie 11; Rebs: Yabusele 9, Bouteille, Lessort 6 Asts: Rozenfeld 3

Pala Getur, Lignano Sabbiadoro – Province of Udine (ITA)
Attendance: 2400
Referees: Daniel Hierrezuelo (ESP), Oliver Krause (GER), Andrei Sharapa (BLR)

11 July 2015
21:00

Boxscore

Belgium	85–68	Croatia
Scoring by quarter: 17–18, 19–14, 25–14, 24–22
Pts: Lecomte 32, Kesteloot 16; Rebs: Kesteloot 11, Vanwijn 6 Asts: Lecomte 6		Pts: Bošnjak 16, Gabrić, Gulam 12; Rebs: Jukić 11, Gabrić 8 Asts: Ćorić 3

Palasport Comunale, Lignano Sabbiadoro – Province of Udine (ITA)
Attendance: 150
Referees: Robert Vyklický (CZE), Pedro Coelho (POR), Martin Horozov (BUL)

=== Group B ===
Pos	Team	Pld	W	L	PF	PA	PD	Pts	Qualification
1	Serbia	4	4	0	353	253	+100	8	Advance to second round
2	Israel	4	3	1	292	299	−7	7	Advance to second round
3	Latvia	4	2	2	268	253	+15	6	Advance to second round
4	Greece	4	1	3	236	261	−25	5	Classification Group H
5	Bulgaria	4	0	4	244	327	−83	4	Classification Group G

Source: FIBA Archive

7 July 2015
14:15

Boxscore

Bulgaria	68–79	Israel
Scoring by quarter: 15–22, 11–25, 23–11, 19–21
Pts: Ivkov 17; Rebs: Milov, Georgiev 4 Asts: Hadzhirusev 2		Pts: Leumi 19; Rebs: Segev 14; Asts: Leumi 5

Pala Getur, Lignano Sabbiadoro – Province of Udine (ITA)
Attendance: 180
Referees: Mindaugas Večerskis (LTU), Ersan Kartal (TUR), Mario Majkic (SLO)

7 July 2015
16:30

Boxscore

Latvia	61–50	Greece
Scoring by quarter: 15–15, 12–15, 15–8, 19–12
Pts: Meznieks 12; Rebs: Šmits 8 Asts: Plavnieks 5		Pts: Christodoulou 10; Rebs: Theodoridis, Spyropoulos 7 Asts: 3 players 1

Pala Getur, Lignano Sabbiadoro – Province of Udine (ITA)
Attendance: 160
Referees: Sergiy Zashchuk (UKR), Haris Bijedić (BIH), Gentian Cici (ALB)

8 July 2015
18:45

Boxscore

Serbia	69–56	Latvia
Scoring by quarter: 18–17, 14–14, 21–17, 16–8
Pts: Davidovac, Tejić 11; Rebs: 3 players 6 Asts: 4 players 2		Pts: Meznieks 14; Rebs: Šmits 16; Asts: 3 players 2

Palasport Comunale, Lignano Sabbiadoro – Province of Udine (ITA)
Attendance: 50
Referees: Daniel Hierrezuelo (ESP), Lorenzo Baldini (ITA), James Alexander Boyer (AUS)

8 July 2015
21:00

Boxscore

Greece	60–51	Bulgaria
Scoring by quarter: 16–13, 12–10, 15–14, 17–14
Pts: Liapis 19; Rebs: Spyropoulos 8 Asts: Chatzinikolas, Christodoulou 2		Pts: Ivkov 17; Rebs: Vangelov 7 Asts: Milov 3

Palasport Comunale, Lignano Sabbiadoro – Province of Udine (ITA)
Attendance: 20
Referees: Sergiy Zashchuk (UKR), Pedro Coelho (POR), Nick Van den Broeck (BEL)

9 July 2015
16:30

Boxscore

Israel	69–64	Greece
Scoring by quarter: 18–10, 18–12, 15–14, 18–28
Pts: Sharon 16; Rebs: 3 players 7 Asts: Sharon 4		Pts: Christodoulou 15; Rebs: Theodoridis 9 Asts: Liapis, Stamatis 3

Palasport Comunale, Lignano Sabbiadoro – Province of Udine (ITA)
Attendance: 70
Referees: Fernando Rocha (POR), Sergei Beliakov (RUS), Mindaugas Večerskis (LTU)

9 July 2015
16:30

Boxscore

Bulgaria	61–104	Serbia
Scoring by quarter: 18–22, 15–34, 13–29, 15–19
Pts: Milov 16; Rebs: Georgiev 5 Asts: Iliev 5		Pts: Gudurić 21; Rebs: Rakićević 7 Asts: Jaramaz 7

Pala Getur, Lignano Sabbiadoro – Province of Udine (ITA)
Attendance: 100
Referees: Zdenko Zubak (SVK), Nick Van den Broeck (BEL), Ciprian Stoica (ROU)

10 July 2015
14:15

Boxscore

Latvia	84–64	Bulgaria
Scoring by quarter: 23–25, 22–10, 17–13, 22–16
Pts: Lomažs 18; Rebs: Šmits 9 Asts: Plavnieks 7		Pts: Iliev, Ivkov 12; Rebs: Kochev 7 Asts: Kochev, Hadzhirusev 3

Palasport Comunale, Lignano Sabbiadoro – Province of Udine (ITA)
Attendance: 60
Referees: Ersan Kartal (TUR), Sergei Beliakov (RUS), Mario Majkič (SLO)

10 July 2015
14:15

Boxscore

Serbia	100–74	Israel
Scoring by quarter: 21–27, 24–9, 29–17, 26–21
Pts: Gudurić 17; Rebs: Rakićević 8 Asts: Jaramaz 5		Pts: Mor 16; Rebs: Mor 6 Asts: Sharon 6

Pala Getur, Lignano Sabbiadoro – Province of Udine (ITA)
Attendance: 80
Referees: Daniel Hierrezuelo (ESP), Lorenzo Baldini (ITA), Nick Van den Broeck (BEL)

11 July 2015
16:30

Boxscore

Greece	62–80	Serbia
Scoring by quarter: 15–17, 11–17, 17–19, 19–27
Pts: Liapis 16; Rebs: Theodoridis 5 Asts: Stamatis 4		Pts: Zagorac 18; Rebs: Zagorac 6 Asts: 3 players 3

Palasport Comunale, Lignano Sabbiadoro – Province of Udine (ITA)
Attendance: 72
Referees: Carmelo Paternico (ITA), Marek Maliszewski (POL), Mario Majkič (SLO)

11 July 2015
16:30

Boxscore

Israel	70–67	Latvia
Scoring by quarter: 14–13, 15–20, 17–15, 24–19
Pts: Sharon 19; Rebs: Weisz 9 Asts: Sharon 3		Pts: Šmits 27; Rebs: Šmits 17; Asts: Lomažs 5

Pala Getur, Lignano Sabbiadoro – Province of Udine (ITA)
Attendance: 120
Referees: Srđan Dožai (CRO), Sergei Beliakov (RUS), Ciprian Stoica (ROU)

=== Group C ===
Pos	Team	Pld	W	L	PF	PA	PD	Pts	Qualification
1	Spain	4	4	0	292	238	+54	8	Advance to second round
2	Czech Republic	4	3	1	318	259	+59	7	Advance to second round
3	Ukraine	4	2	2	285	284	+1	6	Advance to second round
4	Russia	4	1	3	253	263	−10	5	Classification Group G
5	Poland	4	0	4	230	334	−104	4	Classification Group H

Source: FIBA Archive

7 July 2015
14:15

Boxscore

Ukraine	79–55	Poland
Scoring by quarter: 23–12, 23–20, 11–16, 22–7
Pts: Antypov 21; Rebs: Antypov 12; Asts: Sydorov 6		Pts: Nizioł 16; Rebs: Kulka 6 Asts: Dzierżak 5

Palasport Comunale, Lignano Sabbiadoro – Province of Udine (ITA)
Attendance: 40
Referees: Oskars Lucis (LAT), Josip Radojković (CRO), Georgios Poursanidis (GRE)

7 July 2015
16:30

Boxscore

Spain	71–54	Czech Republic
Scoring by quarter: 20–16, 18–14, 13–13, 20–11
Pts: Hernangómez 21; Rebs: Hernangómez, Diop 9 Asts: Sans 3		Pts: Pecháček 18; Rebs: Peterka, Pecháček 7 Asts: Kouril 3

Palasport Comunale, Lignano Sabbiadoro – Province of Udine (ITA)
Attendance: 50
Referees: Ademir Zurapović (BIH), Ciprian Stoica (ROU), Ofer Manheim (ISR)

8 July 2015
14:15

Boxscore

Russia	60–69	Spain
Scoring by quarter: 16–6, 15–26, 16–14, 13–23
Pts: Martynov 16; Rebs: Gankevich 12; Asts: Ukhov 3		Pts: Hernangómez 13; Rebs: Hernangómez 10; Asts: Alonso 4

Palasport Comunale, Lignano Sabbiadoro – Province of Udine (ITA)
Attendance: 50
Referees: Haris Bijedić (BIH), Oliver Krause (GER), Ofer Manheim (ISR)

8 July 2015
18:45

Boxscore

Czech Republic	90–68	Ukraine
Scoring by quarter: 19–23, 24–12, 24–13, 23–20
Pts: Peterka 21; Rebs: Peterka 8 Asts: Kouril 9		Pts: Antypov 21; Rebs: Pryimak 11; Asts: Sydorov 4

Pala Getur, Lignano Sabbiadoro – Province of Udine (ITA)
Attendance: 120
Referees: Srđan Dožai (CRO), Mindaugas Večerskis (LTU), Andres Gaston Bartel Maina (URU)

9 July 2015
14:15

Boxscore

Poland	67–102	Czech Republic
Scoring by quarter: 13–27, 16–33, 21–17, 17–25
Pts: Kulka 17; Rebs: Kulka 6 Asts: Dzierżak 5		Pts: Peterka 22; Rebs: Peterka 11; Asts: Kouril 12

Palasport Comunale, Lignano Sabbiadoro – Province of Udine (ITA)
Attendance: 100
Referees: Miloš Koljenšić (MNE), Mehdi Difallah (FRA), Martin Horozov (BUL)

9 July 2015
21:00

Boxscore

Ukraine	66–59	Russia
Scoring by quarter: 15–17, 12–16, 13–10, 26–16
Pts: Antypov 21; Rebs: Antypov 15; Asts: Sydorov 6		Pts: Popov 20; Rebs: Popov 11; Asts: Gavrilov 2

Palasport Comunale, Lignano Sabbiadoro – Province of Udine (ITA)
Attendance: 60
Referees: Carmelo Paternico (ITA), Josip Radojković (CRO), Andres Gaston Bartel Maina (URU)

10 July 2015
16:30

Boxscore

Russia	81–56	Poland
Scoring by quarter: 30–20, 12–7, 17–14, 22–15
Pts: Gankevich 23; Rebs: Ukhov 7 Asts: Gavrilov 3		Pts: Witliński 17; Rebs: Witliński, Jeszke 7 Asts: Konopatzki 2

Pala Getur, Lignano Sabbiadoro – Province of Udine (ITA)
Attendance: 150
Referees: Haris Bijedić (BIH), Mindaugas Večerskis (LTU), Andres Gaston Bartel Maina (URU)

10 July 2015
18:45

Boxscore

Spain	80–72	Ukraine
Scoring by quarter: 20–21, 13–10, 20–20, 27–21
Pts: García 17; Rebs: Hernangómez 14; Asts: Abalde, Martin 3		Pts: Antypov 21; Rebs: Antypov 6 Asts: Boyarkin 7

Pala Getur, Lignano Sabbiadoro – Province of Udine (ITA)
Attendance: 100
Referees: Ademir Zurapović (BIH), Marek Maliszewski (POL), Ofer Manheim (ISR)

11 July 2015
14:15

Boxscore

Czech Republic	72–53	Russia
Scoring by quarter: 13–21, 12–15, 27–9, 20–8
Pts: Peterka 18, Kouril 14; Rebs: Peterka 12, Pulpan 7 Asts: Kouril 8		Pts: Gankevich 14; Rebs: Gankevich 9 Asts: Gavrilov 4

Palasport Comunale, Lignano Sabbiadoro – Province of Udine (ITA)
Attendance: 70
Referees: Ademir Zurapović (BIH), Nick Van den Broeck (BEL), James Alexander Boyer (AUS)

11 July 2015
14:15

Boxscore

Poland	52–72	Spain
Scoring by quarter: 12–24, 14–12, 12–15, 14–21
Pts: Kulka 14, Wadowski 12; Rebs: Kulka 7, Konopatzki, Witlinski 6 Asts: Wadowski 4		Pts: Hernangómez 14, García 13; Rebs: Sima 10; Asts: Martin 4

Pala Getur, Lignano Sabbiadoro – Province of Udine (ITA)
Attendance: 80
Referees: Lorenzo Baldini (ITA), Zdenko Zubak (SVK), Ofer Manheim (ISR)

=== Group D ===
Pos	Team	Pld	W	L	PF	PA	PD	Pts	Qualification
1	Turkey	4	3	1	248	227	+21	7 (Note: Lithuania–Turkey 50–66)	Advance to second round
2	Lithuania	4	3	1	252	227	+25	7	Advance to second round
3	Germany	4	2	2	237	239	−2	6 (Note: Slovenia–Germany 63–68)	Advance to second round
4	Slovenia	4	2	2	270	286	−16	6	Classification Group H
5	Great Britain	4	0	4	231	259	−28	4	Classification Group G

Source: FIBA Archive
Notes:

7 July 2015
18:45

Boxscore

Turkey	59–57 (OT)	Great Britain
Scoring by quarter: 19–19, 15–6, 8–12, 11–16, Overtime: 6–4
Pts: Birsen 10; Rebs: Koşut 12; Asts: Özmizrak 6		Pts: Lautier-Ogunleye 14; Rebs: Bigby-Williams 14; Asts: Dang-Akodo 5

Palasport Comunale, Lignano Sabbiadoro – Province of Udine (ITA)
Attendance: 50
Referees: Srđan Dožai (CRO), Zdenko Zubak (SVK), Lorenzo Baldini (ITA)

7 July 2015
21:00

Boxscore

Slovenia	63–68	Germany
Scoring by quarter: 13–16, 17–21, 15–22, 18–9
Pts: Mesiček 16; Rebs: Čančar 8 Asts: Mesiček, Nikolič 3		Pts: Obst 15; Rebs: Grof 11; Asts: Obst 2

Palasport Comunale, Lignano Sabbiadoro – Province of Udine (ITA)
Attendance: 100
Referees: Carmelo Paternico (ITA), Miloš Koljenšić (MNE), Mehdi Difallah (FRA)

8 July 2015
14:15

Boxscore

Lithuania	50–66	Turkey
Scoring by quarter: 15–16, 10–18, 11–21, 14–11
Pts: Sabonis 14; Rebs: Sabonis 11; Asts: Sabonis 4		Pts: Özmizrak 14; Rebs: Yasar 6 Asts: Özmizrak 3

Pala Getur, Lignano Sabbiadoro – Province of Udine (ITA)
Attendance: 100
Referees: Carmelo Paternico (ITA), Josip Radojković (CRO), Andrei Sharapa (BLR)

8 July 2015
16:30

Boxscore

Great Britain	72–80	Slovenia
Scoring by quarter: 26–24, 24–15, 9–17, 13–24
Pts: Bigby-Williams 18; Rebs: Bigby-Williams 12; Asts: Dang-Akodo, Nelson 6		Pts: Nikolič 26; Rebs: Nikolič, Ritlop 8 Asts: Barbarič, Mesiček 3

Pala Getur, Lignano Sabbiadoro – Province of Udine (ITA)
Attendance: 100
Referees: Oskars Lucis (LAT), Marek Maliszewski (POL), Mehdi Difallah (FRA)

9 July 2015
14:15

Boxscore

Germany	64–53	Great Britain
Scoring by quarter: 15–8, 15–16, 22–16, 12–13
Pts: Ferner 16; Rebs: Ferner 8 Asts: Obst 5		Pts: Lawson 11; Rebs: Lawson 9 Asts: Dang-Akodo 4

Pala Getur, Lignano Sabbiadoro – Province of Udine (ITA)
Attendance: 100
Referees: Robert Vyklický (CZE), Ademir Zurapovic (BIH), James Alexander Boyer (AUS)

9 July 2015
18:45

Boxscore

Slovenia	60–85	Lithuania
Scoring by quarter: 13–25, 25–23, 14–18, 8–19
Pts: Mesiček 19; Rebs: Nikolič, Čančar 5 Asts: Barbarič 2		Pts: Valinskas 19; Rebs: Sabonis 15; Asts: Zalalis 3

Palasport Comunale, Lignano Sabbiadoro – Province of Udine (ITA)
Attendance: 70
Referees: Haris Bijedić (BIH), Andrei Sharapa (BLR), Georgios Poursanidis (GRE)

10 July 2015
16:30

Boxscore

Lithuania	61–52	Germany
Scoring by quarter: 17–11, 6–22, 22–12, 16–7
Pts: Jurgutis 15; Rebs: Sabonis 14; Asts: Jurgutis 2		Pts: Ugrai 11; Rebs: Ugrai 5 Asts: Akpinar 2

Palasport Comunale, Lignano Sabbiadoro – Province of Udine (ITA)
Attendance: 70
Referees: Srđan Dožai (CRO), Mehdi Difallah (FRA), Georgios Poursanidis (GRE)

10 July 2015
21:00

Boxscore

Turkey	61–67	Slovenia
Scoring by quarter: 25–13, 11–17, 11–12, 14–25
Pts: Birsen, Koşut 13; Rebs: Koşut 9 Asts: Özdemiroglu, Uğurlu 3		Pts: Nikolič 19; Rebs: Nikolič 8 Asts: Nikolič 8

Pala Getur, Lignano Sabbiadoro – Province of Udine (ITA)
Attendance: 300
Referees: Miloš Koljenšić (MNE), Andrei Sharapa (BLR), Ciprian Stoica (ROU)

11 July 2015
18:45

Boxscore

Great Britain	49–56	Lithuania
Scoring by quarter: 9–18, 14–14, 13–16, 13–8
Pts: Bigby-Williams 15; Rebs: Bigby-Williams 7 Asts: Lautier-Ogunleye 3		Pts: Šeškus 14; Rebs: Sabonis 14; Asts: Šeškus 5

Palasport Comunale, Lignano Sabbiadoro – Province of Udine (ITA)
Attendance: 60
Referees: Ersan Kartal (TUR), Gentian Cici (ALB), Andres Gaston Bartel Maina (URU)

11 July 2015
18:45

Boxscore

Germany	53–62	Turkey
Scoring by quarter: 13–12, 15–14, 10–20, 15–16
Pts: Sengfelder 14; Rebs: Mayr 8 Asts: Dizdarević 3		Pts: Koşut, Özmizrak 13; Rebs: Koşut, Yasar 7 Asts: Özmizrak 2

Pala Getur, Lignano Sabbiadoro – Province of Udine (ITA)
Attendance: 300
Referees: Fernando Rocha (POR), Josip Radojković (CRO), Georgios Poursanidis (GRE)

== Second round ==
=== Group E ===
Pos	Team	Pld	W	L	PF	PA	PD	Pts	Qualification
1	Serbia	5	5	0	376	318	+58	10	Advance to Quarterfinals
2	France	5	3	2	307	268	+39	8	Advance to Quarterfinals
3	Latvia	5	2	3	330	313	+17	7 (Note: Latvia 4pts/157:117 (+40) :: Latvia–Italy 82–51, Belgium–Latvia 66–75)	Advance to Quarterfinals
4	Belgium	5	2	3	335	351	−16	7 (Note: Belgium 3pts/132:135 (–3) :: Belgium–Italy 66–60, Belgium–Latvia 66–75)	Advance to Quarterfinals
5	Italy	5	2	3	304	334	−30	7 (Note: Italy 2pts/148:111 (–37) :: Belgium–Italy 66–60, Latvia–Italy 82–51)	9th – 12th place playoffs
6	Israel	5	1	4	323	391	−68	6	9th – 12th place playoffs

Source: FIBA Archive
Notes:

13 July 2015
16:30

Boxscore

Latvia	50–57	France
Scoring by quarter: 9–16, 6–9, 17–13, 18–19
Pts: Meznieks, Šmits 10; Rebs: 3 players 6 Asts: Plavnieks, Paze 3		Pts: Dussoulier 11; Rebs: Kaba 10; Asts: Rozenfeld 5

Pala Getur, Lignano Sabbiadoro – Province of Udine (ITA)
Attendance: 160
Referees: Sergiy Zashchuk (UKR), Josip Radojković (CRO), Martin Horozov (BUL)

13 July 2015
18:45

Boxscore

Israel	68–79	Belgium
Scoring by quarter: 11–19, 18–17, 22–24, 17–19
Pts: Sharon 14; Rebs: Segev 8 Asts: Sharon 6		Pts: Lecomte, Kesteloot 24; Rebs: Bako 17; Asts: Lecomte 5

Pala Getur, Lignano Sabbiadoro – Province of Udine (ITA)
Attendance: 300
Referees: Daniel Hierrezuelo (ESP), Mehdi Difallah (FRA), Mario Majkic (SLO)

13 July 2015
21:00

Boxscore

Italy	61–67	Serbia
Scoring by quarter: 13–11, 19–22, 10–19, 19–15
Pts: Spissu 12; Rebs: Akele, Zilli 5 Asts: Spissu, Fontecchio 3		Pts: Jaramaz 15; Rebs: Gudurić 7 Asts: Gudurić 2

Pala Getur, Lignano Sabbiadoro – Province of Udine (ITA)
Attendance: 2200
Referees: Fernando Rocha (POR), Andrei Sharapa (BLR), Marek Maliszewski (POL)

14 July 2015
14:15

Boxscore

France	70–47	Israel
Scoring by quarter: 22–16, 13–10, 20–7, 15–14
Pts: Luwawu, Cornelie 14; Rebs: Luwawu 8 Asts: Duwiquet 6		Pts: Sharon, Zalmanson 8 Rebs: Mor 10; Asts: 3 players 1

Pala Getur, Lignano Sabbiadoro – Province of Udine (ITA)
Attendance: 100
Referees: Fernando Rocha (POR), Robert Vyklický (CZE), Mario Majkič (SLO)

14 July 2015
16:00

Boxscore

Belgium	74–76	Serbia
Scoring by quarter: 25–14, 9–20, 18–26, 22–16
Pts: Akyazili 19; Rebs: Vanwijn 12; Asts: Lecomte 5		Pts: Tejić 17; Rebs: Zagorac, Tejić 8 Asts: Gudurić 3

Palasport Comunale, Lignano Sabbiadoro – Province of Udine (ITA)
Attendance: 100
Referees: Sergiy Zashchuk (UKR), Mindaugas Večerskis (LTU), Martin Horozov (BUL)

14 July 2015
21:00

Boxscore

Latvia	82–51	Italy
Scoring by quarter: 22–7, 18–8, 17–12, 25–24
Pts: Gluditis 21; Rebs: Geks 7 Asts: Lomažs, Malmanis 3		Pts: Spatti 12; Rebs: Zilli 6 Asts: 4 players 1

Pala Getur, Lignano Sabbiadoro – Province of Udine (ITA)
Attendance: 1500
Referees: Srđan Dožai (CRO), Sergei Beliakov (RUS), Georgios Poursanidis (GRE)

15 July 2015
16:30

Boxscore

Belgium	66–75	Latvia
Scoring by quarter: 16–14, 27–14, 11–18, 12–29
Pts: Lecomte 17; Rebs: Bako 8 Asts: Lecomte 6		Pts: Šmits 26; Rebs: Malmanis, Zvigurs 10; Asts: Lomažs 4

Pala Getur, Lignano Sabbiadoro – Province of Udine (ITA)
Attendance: 350
Referees: Ademir Zurapovic (BIH), Mehdi Difallah (FRA), Mario Majkic (SLO)

15 July 2015
18:45

Boxscore

Serbia	64–53	France
Scoring by quarter: 17–11, 27–10, 13–14, 7–18
Pts: Zagorac 14; Rebs: Tejić 6 Asts: Rebić, Jaramaz 3		Pts: Luwawu 15; Rebs: Lessort 11; Asts: Rozenfeld 4

Pala Getur, Lignano Sabbiadoro – Province of Udine (ITA)
Attendance: 150
Referees: Fernando Rocha (POR), Robert Vyklický (CZE), Pedro Coelho (POR)

15 July 2015
21:00

Boxscore

Israel	64–75	Italy
Scoring by quarter: 12–16, 12–25, 27–18, 13–16
Pts: Leumi 16; Rebs: 3 players 6 Asts: Segal 5		Pts: Fontecchio 17; Rebs: Akele 7 Asts: Fontecchio, Akele 3

Pala Getur, Lignano Sabbiadoro – Province of Udine (ITA)
Attendance: 1300
Referees: Sergiy Zashchuk (UKR), Josip Radojkovic (CRO), Ciprian Stoica (ROU)

=== Group F ===
Pos	Team	Pld	W	L	PF	PA	PD	Pts	Qualification
1	Spain	5	5	0	351	276	+75	10	Advance to Quarterfinals
2	Turkey	5	4	1	330	289	+41	9	Advance to Quarterfinals
3	Czech Republic	5	2	3	361	357	+4	7 (Note: Czech Republic 3pts/150:134 (+7) :: Lithuania–Czech Republic 69–79, Czech Republic–Germany 71–74)	Advance to Quarterfinals
4	Lithuania	5	2	3	312	322	−10	7 (Note: Lithuania 3pts/130:131 (–1) :: Lithuania–Germany 61–52, Lithuania–Czech Republic 69–79)	Advance to Quarterfinals
5	Germany	5	2	3	280	321	−41	7 (Note: Germany 3pts/126:132 (–6) :: Lithuania–Germany 61–52, Czech Republic–Germany 71–74)	9th – 12th place playoffs
6	Ukraine	5	0	5	311	380	−69	5	9th – 12th place playoffs

Source: FIBA Archive
Notes:

13 July 2015
14:15

Boxscore

Lithuania	69–79	Czech Republic
Scoring by quarter: 12–25, 12–13, 26–24, 19–17
Pts: Šeškus 20; Rebs: Sabonis 13; Asts: Valinskas 7		Pts: Skranc 19; Rebs: Peterka 8 Asts: Peterka 3

Pala Getur, Lignano Sabbiadoro – Province of Udine (ITA)
Attendance: 100
Referees: Ersan Kartal (TUR), Nick Van den Broeck (BEL), Ciprian Stoica (ROU)

13 July 2015
16:00

Boxscore

Germany	40–75	Spain
Scoring by quarter: 10–19, 8–19, 12–21, 10–16
Pts: Dizdarevic, Sengfelder 8 Rebs: Ugrai 6 Asts: Ugrai, Mayr 2		Pts: Abalde, Diop 11; Rebs: Nogues, Hernangómez 6 Asts: Martin 6

Palasport Comunale, Lignano Sabbiadoro – Province of Udine (ITA)
Attendance: 100
Referees: Srđan Dožai (CRO), Georgios Poursanidis (GRE), Pedro Coelho (POR)

13 July 2015
18:15

Boxscore

Ukraine	62–79	Turkey
Scoring by quarter: 16–18, 21–16, 12–16, 13–29
Pts: Dziuba 18; Rebs: Antypov 15; Asts: Sydorov, Bilous 4		Pts: Koşut 24; Rebs: Koşut, Birsen 11; Asts: Özmızrak 8

Palasport Comunale, Lignano Sabbiadoro – Province of Udine (ITA)
Attendance: 60
Referees: Carmelo Paternico (ITA), Haris Bijedić (BIH), Andres Gaston Bartel Maina (URU)

14 July 2015
16:30

Boxscore

Spain	68–62	Lithuania
Scoring by quarter: 16–14, 10–17, 24–16, 18–15
Pts: Martin 22; Rebs: Sima, Nogues 6 Asts: Abalde, Martin 2		Pts: Valinskas 15; Rebs: Šeškus, Sabonis 6 Asts: Jurgutis, Aukštikalnis 2

Pala Getur, Lignano Sabbiadoro – Province of Udine (ITA)
Attendance: 200
Referees: Carmelo Paternico (ITA), Gentian Cici (ALB), Marek Maliszewski (POL)

14 July 2015
18:15

Boxscore

Czech Republic	67–75	Turkey
Scoring by quarter: 18–21, 21–24, 14–17, 14–13
Pts: Peterka 21; Rebs: Peterka, Skranc 9 Asts: Kouril 4		Pts: Ulubay 24; Rebs: Ulubay, Koşut 7 Asts: Özmızrak 6

Palasport Comunale, Lignano Sabbiadoro – Province of Udine (ITA)
Attendance: 70
Referees: Oskars Lucis (LAT), Andrei Sharapa (BLR), James Alexander Boyer (AUS)

14 July 2015
18:45

Boxscore

Germany	61–52	Ukraine
Scoring by quarter: 17–15, 20–19, 12–10, 12–8
Pts: Sengfelder 16; Rebs: Sengfelder 12; Asts: Ugrai 4		Pts: Antypov 11; Rebs: Antypov 11; Asts: 3 players 2

Pala Getur, Lignano Sabbiadoro – Province of Udine (ITA)
Attendance: 250
Referees: Daniel Hierrezuelo (ESP), Josip Radojković (CRO), Nick Van den Broeck (BEL)

15 July 2015
14:15

Boxscore

Turkey	48–57	Spain
Scoring by quarter: 14–14, 6–14, 17–18, 11–11
Pts: Birsen 11; Rebs: Birsen, Arar 5 Asts: Geçim, Uğurlu 2		Pts: Hernangómez 15; Rebs: Diop 14; Asts: Abalde 3

Pala Getur, Lignano Sabbiadoro – Province of Udine (ITA)
Attendance: 100
Referees: Srđan Dožai (CRO), Haris Bijedić (BIH), Oliver Krause (GER)

15 July 2015
16:15

Boxscore

Lithuania	70–57	Ukraine
Scoring by quarter: 9–14, 19–15, 24–20, 18–8
Pts: Sabonis 18; Rebs: Sabonis 28; Asts: Sabonis 6		Pts: Balaban 12; Rebs: Antypov 9 Asts: 3 players 2

Palasport Comunale, Lignano Sabbiadoro – Province of Udine (ITA)
Attendance: 49
Referees: Miloš Koljenšić (MNE), Georgios Poursanidis (GRE), Andres Gaston Bartel Maina (URU)

15 July 2015
18:15

Boxscore

Czech Republic	71–74	Germany
Scoring by quarter: 19–23, 15–11, 13–20, 24–20
Pts: Pechacek 14; Rebs: Pechacek 10; Asts: Kouril 5		Pts: Ugrai, Sengfelder 14; Rebs: Grof 10; Asts: Ugrai 3

Palasport Comunale, Lignano Sabbiadoro – Province of Udine (ITA)
Attendance: 100
Referees: Oskars Lucis (LAT), Gentian Cici (ALB), Martio Horozov (BUL)

== Classification groups for 13th – 20th places ==
=== Group G ===
Pos	Team	Pld	W	L	PF	PA	PD	Pts	Team will play in
1	Russia	3	3	0	247	205	+42	6	13th – 16th place playoffs
2	Great Britain	3	2	1	218	195	+23	5	13th – 16th place playoffs
3	Croatia	3	1	2	216	200	+16	4	17th – 20th place playoffs
4	Bulgaria	3	0	3	161	242	−81	3	17th – 20th place playoffs

Source: FIBA Archive

13 July 2015
14:15

Boxscore

Croatia	64–68	Great Britain
Scoring by quarter: 21–20, 11–20, 20–14, 12–14
Scoring by half: 32–40
Pts: Božić 14; Rebs: Bačak 15; Asts: Bošnjak 3		Pts: McSwiggan 13; Rebs: Bigby-Williams 8 Asts: Dang-Akodo 4

Palasport Latisana, Latisana – Province of Udine (ITA)
Attendance: 50
Referees: Sergei Beliakov (RUS), Lorenzo Baldini (ITA), Oliver Krause (GER)

13 July 2015
18:45

Boxscore

Bulgaria	61–84	Russia
Scoring by quarter: 10–18, 15–17, 19–30, 17–19
Scoring by half: 23–35
Pts: Milov 14; Rebs: Kochev 6 Asts: Kochev 3		Pts: Viktorov 20; Rebs: Ukhov 11; Asts: Gavrilov 7

Palasport Latisana, Latisana – Province of Udine (ITA)
Attendance: 30
Referees: Ademir Zurapovic (BIH), Robert Vyklický (CZE), Ofer Manheim (ISR)

14 July 2015
14:15

Boxscore

Great Britain	77–51	Bulgaria
Scoring by quarter: 24–16, 17–7, 16–7, 20–21
Scoring by half: 42–23
Pts: Nelson 17; Rebs: Bigby-Williams 9 Asts: Soluade 3		Pts: Hadzhirusev 12; Rebs: Vangelov 5 Asts: Iliev 3

Palasport Latisana, Latisana – Province of Udine (ITA)
Attendance: 50
Referees: Ademir Zurapović (BIH), Lorenzo Baldini (ITA), Pedro Coelho (POR)

14 July 2015
18:45

Boxscore

Russia	83–71	Croatia
Scoring by quarter: 23–19, 22–11, 20–20, 18–21
Scoring by half: 45–30
Pts: Viktorov 24; Rebs: Gankevich 12; Asts: Gavrilov 8		Pts: Jukić 14; Rebs: Božić 8 Asts: 3 players 2

Palasport Latisana, Latisana – Province of Udine (ITA)
Attendance: 30
Referees: Haris Bijedić (BIH), Ciprian Stoica (ROU), Andres Gaston Bartel Maina (URU)

15 July 2015
14:15

Boxscore

Croatia	81–49	Bulgaria
Scoring by quarter: 26–12, 15–16, 21–11, 19–10
Scoring by half: 41–28
Pts: Božić, Filipović 14; Rebs: Ćorić 7 Asts: 3 players 1		Pts: Milov 11; Rebs: Milov 7 Asts: 3 players 1

Palasport Latisana, Latisana – Province of Udine (ITA)
Attendance: 10
Referees: Mindaugas Vecerskis (LTU), Lorenzo Baldini (ITA), Marek Maliszewski (POL)

15 July 2015
16:30

Boxscore

Russia	80–73	Great Britain
Scoring by quarter: 24–11, 24–17, 13–21, 19–24
Scoring by half: 48–28
Pts: Popov 25; Rebs: Ukhov 6 Asts: Gavrilov 4		Pts: Soluade 19; Rebs: Bigby-Williams 13; Asts: 7 players 1

Palasport Latisana, Latisana – Province of Udine (ITA)
Attendance: 15
Referees: Ersan Kartal (TUR), Zdenko Zubak (SVK), Nick Van den Broeck (BEL)

=== Group H ===
Pos	Team	Pld	W	L	PF	PA	PD	Pts	Team will play in
1	Poland	3	2	1	200	187	+13	5	13th – 16th place playoffs
2	Slovenia	3	2	1	191	195	−4	5	13th – 16th place playoffs
3	Greece	3	1	2	218	184	+34	4	17th – 20th place playoffs
4	Bosnia and Herzegovina	3	1	2	181	200	−19	4	17th – 20th place playoffs

Source: FIBA Archive

13 July 2015
16:30

Boxscore

Bosnia and Herzegovina	59–63	Slovenia
Scoring by quarter: 18–25, 16–9, 13–12, 12–17
Scoring by half: 34–34
Pts: Buza 18, Polutak 15; Rebs: Polutak 10, Buza 9 Asts: Zahiragić 4		Pts: Karavdić 15, Mesiček 13, Ritlop, Šantelj 11; Rebs: Mesiček 9, Ritlop, Šantelj 6 Asts: Nikolič 7, Mesiček 6

Palasport Latisana, Latisana – Province of Udine (ITA)
Attendance: 40
Referees: Oskars Lucis (LAT), Gentian Cici (ALB), James Alexander Boyer (AUS)

13 July 2015
21:00

Boxscore

Greece	71–80 (OT)	Poland
Scoring by quarter: 14–10, 21–13, 14–23, 16–19, Overtime: 6–15
Scoring by half: 35–23 Overtime: 6–15
Pts: Christodoulou 23, Liapis 17; Rebs: Liapis 8, Christodoulou, Theodoridis 5 Asts: Chatzinikolas 3		Pts: Witliński 23, Nizioł 22, Dzierżak, Wadowski 12; Rebs: Jeszke 18, Witliński 7, Nizioł 6 Asts: Jeszke 6

Palasport Latisana, Latisana – Province of Udine (ITA)
Attendance: 50
Referees: Miloš Koljenšić (MNE), Mindaugas Večerskis (LTU), Zdenko Zubak (SVK)

14 July 2015
16:30

Boxscore

Poland	62–66	Bosnia and Herzegovina
Scoring by quarter: 14–20, 9–15, 17–19, 22–12
Scoring by half: 23–35
Pts: Konopatzki 15, Witliński 13; Rebs: Kulka, Witliński 6 Asts: Jeszke, Kulka, Wadowski 1		Pts: Ivković 16, Polutak 12; Rebs: Polutak 9, Ivković, Lužaić, Milanović 5 Asts: Zahiragić 3

Palasport Latisana, Latisana – Province of Udine (ITA)
Attendance: 45
Referees: Ersan Kartal (TUR), Mehdi Difallah (FRA), Zdenko Zubak (SVK)

14 July 2015
21:00

Boxscore

Slovenia	78–72 (OT)	Greece
Scoring by quarter: 11–21, 15–9, 22- 12, 9–15, Overtime: 10–10, 11–5
Scoring by half: 36–30 Overtime: 10–10, 11–5
Pts: Mesiček 27, Nikolič 25, Barbarič 10; Rebs: Mesiček 7 Asts: Nikolič, Špan 6		Pts: Christodoulou, Stamatis 12; Rebs: Kottas 6 Asts: Stamatis 6, Spyropoulos 5

Palasport Latisana, Latisana – Province of Udine (ITA)
Attendance: 50
Referees: Miloš Koljenšić (MNE), Oliver Krause (GER), Ofer Manheim (ISR)

15 July 2015
18:45

Boxscore

Bosnia and Herzegovina	56–75	Greece
Scoring by quarter: 19–19, 0–13, 13–21, 24–22
Scoring by half: 19–32
Pts: Buza 15, Ivković, Milanović 9 Rebs: Buza 11, Lončar, Polutak 7 Asts: Buza, Lužaić 2		Pts: Christodoulou 12, Chatzinikolas 9, 3 players 8 Rebs: Billis 11, Chatzinikolas 6 Asts: Billis 3

Palasport Latisana, Latisana – Province of Udine (ITA)
Attendance: 30
Referees: Daniel Hierrezuelo (ESP), Andrei Sharapa (BLR), James Alexander Boyer (AUS)

15 July 2015
21:00

Boxscore

Poland	58–50	Slovenia
Scoring by quarter: 19–9, 11–16, 16–14, 12–11
Scoring by half: 30–25
Pts: Wadowski 14, Włodarczyk 10; Rebs: Witliński 15, Kulka 6 Asts: Wadowski, Dzierżak 3		Pts: Nikolič 15, Čančar 8 Rebs: Nikolič 10, Barbarič 7 Asts: Špan 2

Palasport Latisana, Latisana – Province of Udine (ITA)
Attendance: 60
Referees: Carmelo Paternico (ITA), Sergei Beliakov (RUS), Ofer Manheim (ISR)

== Classification playoffs for 9th – 20th place ==
=== Classification games for 17th – 20th place ===
17 July 2015
14:15

Boxscore

Croatia	76–45	Bosnia and Herzegovina
Scoring by quarter: 18–15, 22–7, 18–11, 18–12
Pts: Gulam 15, Božić 12; Rebs: Filipović 8, Bačak, Bošnjak 6 Asts: Filipović 6		Pts: Buza 16, Lakić 13; Rebs: Buza 8, Lončar 5 Asts: Buza 6, Zahiragić 3

Palasport Latisana, Latisana – Province of Udine (ITA)
Attendance: 25
Referees: Mindaugas Večerskis (LTU), Mehdi Difallah (FRA), Ofer Manheim (ISR)

17 July 2015
16:30

Boxscore

Greece	74–67	Bulgaria
Scoring by quarter: 16–15, 20–27, 19–11, 9–11
Pts: Liapis, Spyropoulos 14; Rebs: Christodoulou 7 Asts: Christodoulou 9		Pts: Hadzhirusev 16; Rebs: Stavrev, Georgiev 6 Asts: Kochev 5

Palasport Latisana, Latisana – Province of Udine (ITA)
Attendance: 15
Referees: Ersan Kartal (TUR), Andrei Sharapa (BLR), Andres Gaston Bartel Maina (URU)

=== Classification games for 13th – 16th place ===
17 July 2015
18:45

Boxscore

Russia	65–78	Slovenia
Scoring by quarter: 17–18, 17–17, 16–26, 15–17
Pts: Popov 16; Rebs: Popov, Gankevich 8 Asts: Gavrilov 9		Pts: Nikolič 21; Rebs: Čančar 9 Asts: Nikolič 5

Palasport Latisana, Latisana – Province of Udine (ITA)
Attendance: 50
Referees: Fernando Rocha (POR), Oliver Krause (GER), Martin Horozov (BUL)

17 July 2015
21:00

Boxscore

Poland	86–84 (OT)	Great Britain
Scoring by quarter: 22–17, 11–17, 21–16, 19–23, Overtime: 13–11
Pts: Wadowski 20; Rebs: Witliński 11; Asts: Dzierżak 5		Pts: Nelson 26; Rebs: Bigby-Williams 10; Asts: Nelson 8

Palasport Latisana, Latisana – Province of Udine (ITA)
Attendance: 60
Referees: Oskars Lucis (LAT), Robert Vyklický (CZE), James Alexander Boyer (AUS)

=== Classification games for 9th – 12th place ===
17 July 2015
16:00

Boxscore

Germany	46–54	Israel
Scoring by quarter: 17–12, 12–21, 10–9, 7–12
Pts: Ugrai 7 Rebs: Akpinar 8 Asts: Akpinar, Obst 3		Pts: Sharon 15; Rebs: Weisz, Levi 7 Asts: Sharon, Segal 2

Palasport Comunale, Lignano Sabbiadoro – Province of Udine (ITA)
Attendance: 70
Referees: Sergei Beliakov (RUS), Josip Radojković (CRO), Marek Maliszewski (POL)

17 July 2015
18:15

Boxscore

Italy	73–48	Ukraine
Scoring by quarter: 21–13, 24–9, 19–15, 9–11
Pts: Fontecchio 22; Rebs: Fontecchio 6 Asts: 3 players 2		Pts: Orlov 15; Rebs: Orlov 7 Asts: Sydorov 4

Palasport Comunale, Lignano Sabbiadoro – Province of Udine (ITA)
Attendance: 250
Referees: Ademir Zurapović (BIH), Gentian Cici (ALB), Nick Van den Broeck (BEL)

== Championship playoffs ==
Fifth place
E3	Latvia	77
F3	Czech Republic	66
Seventh place
F4	Lithuania	77
E4	Belgium	70

Consolation semifinals
F4	Lithuania	80
E3	Latvia	82 OT
E4	Belgium	81
F3	Czech Republic	96

Quarterfinals
E1	Serbia	82
F4	Lithuania	69
F2	Turkey	72
E3	Latvia	58
F1	Spain	67
E4	Belgium	55
E2	France	80
F3	Czech Republic	58

Semifinals
E1	Serbia	81
F2	Turkey	58
F1	Spain	70
E2	France	61

Final
E1	Serbia	70
F1	Spain	64
Third place
F2	Turkey	84
E2	France	74

=== Quarterfinals ===
17 July 2015
14:15

Boxscore

France	80–58	Czech Republic
Scoring by quarter: 22–21, 20–10, 23–15, 15–12
Scoring by half: 42–31
Pts: Yabusele 13, Cornelie, Sidibe 11; Rebs: Cornelie 10; Asts: Rozenfeld 6, Duwiquet 4		Pts: Peterka 11, Dragoun, Pecháček 10; Rebs: Peterka 4 Asts: Pecháček 5, Pulpan 4

Pala Getur, Lignano Sabbiadoro – Province of Udine (ITA)
Attendance: 140
Referees: Srđan Dožai (CRO), Lorenzo Baldini (ITA), Pedro Coelho (POR)

17 July 2015
16:30

Boxscore

Spain	67–55	Belgium
Scoring by quarter: 16–13, 16–20, 19–7, 16–15
Scoring by half: 32–33
Pts: Hernangómez 17; Rebs: Hernangómez 15; Asts: Martin 5		Pts: Kesteloot 17; Rebs: Bako 7 Asts: Hemeleers 4

Pala Getur, Lignano Sabbiadoro – Province of Udine (ITA)
Attendance: 200
Referees: Sergiy Zashchuk (UKR), Haris Bijedić (BIH), Zdenko Zubak (SVK)

17 July 2015
18:45

Boxscore

Turkey	72–58	Latvia
Scoring by quarter: 22–12, 12–14, 14–18, 24–15
Scoring by half: 34–26
Pts: Birsen 17, Özmızrak 15, Koşut 14; Rebs: Koşut 8, Birsen, Ulubay 6 Asts: Özmızrak, Özdemiroğlu 4		Pts: Gluditis 17, Zvigurs 13, Šmits 12; Rebs: Šmits 11, Malmanis 7 Asts: Gluditis, Lomažs, Paze 2

Pala Getur, Lignano Sabbiadoro – Province of Udine (ITA)
Attendance: 150
Referees: Daniel Hierrezuelo (ESP), Miloš Koljenšić (MNE), Mario Majkič (SLO)

17 July 2015
21:00

Boxscore

Serbia	82–69	Lithuania
Scoring by quarter: 17–13, 30–8, 15–24, 20–24
Scoring by half: 47–21
Pts: Gudurić 17, Davidovac 16, Rebić 15; Rebs: Davidovac 9, Tejić 7 Asts: Rebić, Rakićević, Zagorac 3		Pts: Šeškus, Valinskas 19; Rebs: Sabonis 5 Asts: Kumelis 5

Pala Getur, Lignano Sabbiadoro – Province of Udine (ITA)
Attendance: 400
Referees: Carmelo Paternico (ITA), Georgios Poursanidis (GRE), Ciprian Stoica (ROU)

=== Classification games for 5th – 8th place ===
18 July 2015
14:15

Boxscore

Belgium	81–96	Czech Republic
Scoring by quarter: 19–26, 26–16, 15–31, 21–23
Pts: Lecomte 29, Kesteloot 20; Rebs: Vanwijn, van Vliet 8 Asts: Akyazili, Vanwijn 3		Pts: Peterka 18, Pecháček 16, Šoula 14; Rebs: Skranc 8, Kouril 7 Asts: Kouril 7

Pala Getur, Lignano Sabbiadoro – Province of Udine (ITA)
Attendance: 100
Referees: Miloš Koljenšić (MNE), Haris Bijedić (BIH), Andres Gaston Bartel Maina (URU)

18 July 2015
16:30

Boxscore

Lithuania	80–82 (OT)	Latvia
Scoring by quarter: 23–25, 19–13, 11–14, 17–18, Overtime: 10–12
Pts: Valinskas 19, Sabonis 16; Rebs: Pipiras 9, Sabonis 8 Asts: Kumelis 5		Pts: Gluditis 22, Šmits 13; Rebs: Šmits 12, Malmanis 8 Asts: Paze 4

Pala Getur, Lignano Sabbiadoro – Province of Udine (ITA)
Attendance: 150
Referees: Ersan Kartal (TUR), Lorenzo Baldini (ITA), James Alexander Boyer (AUS)

=== Semifinals ===
18 July 2015
18:45

Boxscore

Spain	70–61	France
Scoring by quarter: 15–10, 20–20, 19–15, 16–16
Pts: Abalde 18, Hernangómez 17; Rebs: Martin 7, Hernangómez 6 Asts: Martin 5		Pts: Rozenfeld 19, Luwawu 12; Rebs: Luwawu 9, Yabusele 8, Kaba 7 Asts: Luwawu 2

Pala Getur, Lignano Sabbiadoro – Province of Udine (ITA)
Attendance: 700
Referees: Ademir Zurapović (BIH), Sergei Beliakov (RUS), Georgios Poursanidis (GRE)

18 July 2015
21:00

Boxscore

Serbia	81–58	Turkey
Scoring by quarter: 16–17, 21–8, 19–13, 25–20
Pts: Gudurić 21, Jaramaz 14, Rebić 11; Rebs: Zagorac 6, 4 players 5 Asts: Gudurić 5, Rebić 3		Pts: Uğurlu 12, Özmızrak 11; Rebs: Koşut 7 Asts: Özmızrak, Uğurlu 4

Pala Getur, Lignano Sabbiadoro – Province of Udine (ITA)
Attendance: 1100
Referees: Oskars Lucis (LAT), Sergiy Zashchuk (UKR), Oliver Krause (GER)

== Final classification games ==
=== Match for 19th place ===
18 July 2015
16:00

Boxscore

Bosnia and Herzegovina	88–78 (OT)	Bulgaria
Scoring by quarter: 19–14, 16–15, 16–26, 21–17, Overtime: 16–6
Pts: Ivković 20; Rebs: Gačić, Lakić 7 Asts: Lužaić, Zahiragić 4		Pts: Iliev, Hadzhirusev 14; Rebs: Milov 8 Asts: Hadzhirusev 4

Palasport Latisana, Latisana – Province of Udine (ITA)
Attendance: 20
Referees: Andrei Sharapa (BLR), Robert Vyklický (CZE), Ofer Manheim (ISR)

=== Match for 17th place ===
18 July 2015
18:30

Boxscore

Croatia	63–52	Greece
Scoring by quarter: 17–14, 18–17, 18–10, 10–11
Pts: Filipović 18; Rebs: Filipović, Božić 8 Asts: Filipović, Božić 3		Pts: Christodoulou 10; Rebs: Christodoulou, Theodoridis 5 Asts: Liapis 3

Palasport Latisana, Latisana – Province of Udine (ITA)
Attendance: 20
Referees: Mindaugas Večerskis (LTU), Mehdi Difallah (FRA), Marek Maliszewski (POL)

=== Match for 15th place ===
19 July 2015
14:00

Boxscore

Russia	62–86	Great Britain
Scoring by quarter: 21–20, 10–23, 14–22, 17–21
Pts: Antonikovskii 16; Rebs: Kulikov 11; Asts: Tukmakov 5		Pts: Nelson 26; Rebs: Bigby-Williams 15; Asts: Nelson 8

Palasport Latisana, Latisana – Province of Udine (ITA)
Attendance: 20
Referees: Zdenko Zubak (SVK), Pedro Coelho (POR), Oliver Krause (GER)

=== Match for 13th place ===
19 July 2015
16:30

Boxscore

Slovenia	86–43	Poland
Scoring by quarter: 24–13, 17–19, 19–4, 26–7
Pts: Mesiček 27; Rebs: Čančar, Šantelj 9 Asts: Nikolič 5		Pts: Niziol 12; Rebs: Witlinski 8 Asts: Stawiak 2

Palasport Latisana, Latisana – Province of Udine (ITA)
Attendance: 60
Referees: Srđan Dožai (CRO), Ersan Kartal (TUR), Mehdi Difallah (FRA)

=== Match for 11th place ===
19 July 2015
16:00

Boxscore

Ukraine	62–72	Germany
Scoring by quarter: 14–23, 18–19, 13–18, 17–12
Pts: Sydorov 12; Rebs: Antypov 13; Asts: Sydorov 3		Pts: Mayr 15; Rebs: Sengfelder 11; Asts: Grof 5

Palasport Comunale, Lignano Sabbiadoro – Province of Udine (ITA)
Attendance: 40
Referees: Mindaugas Večerskis (LTU), Haris Bijedić (BIH), Lorenzo Baldini (ITA)

=== Match for 9th place ===
19 July 2015
18:15

Boxscore

Italy	77–69	Israel
Scoring by quarter: 20–18, 26–14, 18–26, 13–11
Pts: Spissu 15; Rebs: Vedovato 8 Asts: Fontecchio 3		Pts: Mor 24; Rebs: Zalmanson 10; Asts: Sharon, Segal 2

Palasport Comunale, Lignano Sabbiadoro – Province of Udine (ITA)
Attendance: 1000
Referees: Oskars Lucis (LAT), Sergei Beliakov (RUS), Mario Majkič (SLO)

=== Match for 7th place ===
19 July 2015
14:15

Boxscore

Lithuania	77–70	Belgium
Scoring by quarter: 15–21, 15–19, 25–14, 22–16
Pts: Sabonis 19; Rebs: Sabonis 18; Asts: Sabonis, Šeškus 3		Pts: Kesteloot 17; Rebs: Kesteloot 10; Asts: Hemeleers 8

Pala Getur, Lignano Sabbiadoro – Province of Udine (ITA)
Attendance: 100
Referees: Sergiy Zashchuk (UKR), Ciprian Stoica (ROU), Martin Horozov (BUL)

=== Match for 5th place ===
19 July 2015
16:30

Boxscore

Latvia	77–66	Czech Republic
Scoring by quarter: 14–17, 14–18, 27–11, 22–20
Pts: Jaunzems 16; Rebs: Lomažs 9 Asts: Paze 4		Pts: Peterka 13; Rebs: Peterka 9 Asts: 4 players 2

Pala Getur, Lignano Sabbiadoro – Province of Udine (ITA)
Attendance: 120
Referees: Ademir Zurapović (BIH), Andrei Sharapa (BLR), Nick Van den Broeck (BEL)

=== Bronze medal match ===
19 July 2015
18:45

Boxscore

Turkey	84–74	France
Scoring by quarter: 20–15, 26–12, 14–21, 24–26
Pts: Özmızrak, Yaşar 13; Rebs: Özdemiroğlu 8, Özmızrak 7 Asts: Uğurlu 4, Özmızrak 3		Pts: Luwawu 19, Cornelie 12; Rebs: Lessort 9, Yabusele 7 Asts: Duwiquet 4, Rozenfeld 3

Pala Getur, Lignano Sabbiadoro – Province of Udine (ITA)
Attendance: 1000
Referees: Daniel Hierrezuelo (ESP), Josip Radojković (CRO), Gentian Cici (ALB)

=== Final ===
19 July 2015
21:00

Boxscore

Serbia	70–64	Spain
Scoring by quarter: 20–21, 17–15, 16–9, 17–19
Pts: Jaramaz 19, Gudurić 14, Zagorac 11; Rebs: Jaramaz 10, Apić 8, Zagorac 7 Asts: Apić 2		Pts: Hernangómez 18, García 17; Rebs: Hernangómez 9, Diop 8 Asts: Abalde 3

Pala Getur, Lignano Sabbiadoro – Province of Udine (ITA)
Attendance: 2100
Referees: Fernando Rocha (POR), Carmelo Paternico (ITA), Milos Koljenšić (MNE)

== Final standings ==
Rank	Team	Record
1st place, gold medalist(s)	Serbia	10–0
2nd place, silver medalist(s)	Spain	9–1
3rd place, bronze medalist(s)	Turkey	7–3
4th	France	6–4
5th	Latvia	6–4
6th	Czech Republic	5–5
7th	Lithuania	5–5
8th	Belgium	4–6
9th	Italy	5–4
10th	Israel	4–5
11th	Germany	5–4
12th	Ukraine	2–7
13th	Slovenia	6–3
14th	Poland	3–6
15th	Great Britain	3–6
16th	Russia	4–5
17th	Croatia	4–5
18th	Greece	3–6
19th	Bosnia and Herzegovina	3–6
20th	Bulgaria	0–9

2015 FIBA U20 EuroBasket
winners

Serbia
Third title

Team roster:

Nikola Rebić,
Rade Zagorac,
Marko Gudurić,
Petar Rakićević,
Dragan Apić,
Božidar Babović,
Ognjen Jaramaz,
Dejan Davidovac,
Aleksandar Bursać,
Đorđe Kaplanović,
Đoko Šalić,
Marko Tejić

Head Coach:

Vladimir Đokić

Team relegated to the 2016 FIBA U20 European Championship Division B

== Awards ==
Most Valuable Player
(Serbia) Marko Gudurić

=== All-Tournament Team ===
- (Belgium) Manu Lecomte
- (Serbia) Nikola Rebić
- (Serbia) Marko Gudurić
- (Spain) Juancho Hernangómez
- (Turkey) Emircan Koşut
