= 2017 Belgian Basketball Supercup =

2017 bpost Supercup
Oostende	Hubo Limburg United
91	92
- Date: 16 September 2017
- Venue: Sleuyter Arena, Ostend
- MVP: (Belgium) Vincent Kesteloot

The 2017 Belgian Basketball Supercup, for sponsorship reasons the bpost Supercup, was the 20th edition of the annual super cup game in Belgian basketball. Oostende, winner of the 2016–17 Basketball League Belgium Division I, played against at Hubo Limburg United, runners-up of the 2016–17 Belgian Basketball Cup.

The game was played at 16 September 2017 in the Sleuyter Arena in Ostend.

== Match details ==
Oostende won its 10th Supercup, after Mike Myers hit the game-winning buzzer beater. Vincent Kesteloot was named the Most Valuable Player, after he recorded 14 points and 5 assists.

16 September 2017	Oostende	92–91	Hubo Limburg United	Sleuyter Arena, Ostend
20:00	Scoring by quarter: 28–25, 24–24, 17–24, 22–17
	Pts: Kesteloot 14	Boxscore	Pts: Unruh 20

Oostende	Limburg

== See also ==
- 2017–18 Basketball League Belgium Division I
- 2017–18 Belgian Basketball Cup
