= Ugrai =

Ugrai is a surname. Notable people with the surname include:

- Max Ugrai (born 1995), German basketball player
- Roland Ugrai (born 1992), Hungarian footballer
