= Ioannis Chatzinikolas =

Greek basketball player (born 1995)

Ioannis Chatzinikolas Γιάννης Χατζηνικόλας
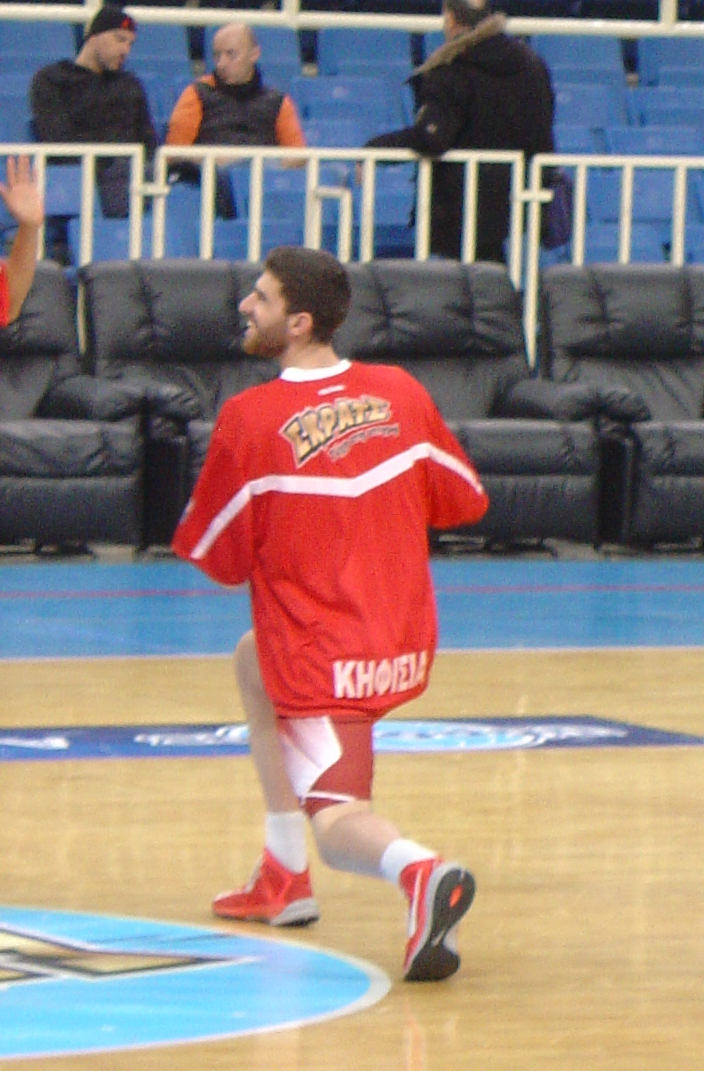
- Chatzinikolas with Nea Kifissia, in 2016.

No. 11 – Doxa Lefkadas
- Position: Point guard / shooting guard
- League: GBL

Personal information
- Born: October 7, 1995 (age 31) Maroussi, Athens, Greece
- Listed height: 6 ft 5 in (1.96 m)
- Listed weight: 200 lb (91 kg)

Career information
- Playing career: 2011–present

Career history
- 2011–2016: Nea Kifissia
- 2014–2015: →Pagrati
- 2016–2017: Koroivos Amaliadas
- 2017–2018: Trikala
- 2018–2019: Ippokratis Kos
- 2019–2020: PAOK
- 2020–2021: Charilaos Trikoupis
- 2021–2022: Oberwart Gunners
- 2022–2023: Panthers Schwenningen
- 2023–2025: Kolossos Rodou
- 2025: Tampereen Pyrintö
- 2025–present: Doxa Lefkadas

Career highlights
- 2x Greek Elite League champion (2013, 2026)

Ioannis Chatzinikolas (alternate spelling: Giannis) (born 7 October 1995) is a Greek professional basketball player for Doxa Lefkadas of the GBL.

== Professional career ==
After playing youth basketball with the junior teams of Nea Kifissia, Chatzinikolas began his professional career in 2011, with the Greek Second Division club Nea Kifissia's senior men's team. In 2014, he was loaned to Pagrati. He left Nea Kifissia, when the club was relegated down from the first-tier level Greek Basket League, to the third-tier level Greek B League, due to financial problems.

On August 3, 2016, he joined Koroivos Amaliadas. On September 10, 2019, Chatzinikolas returned to the first division, signing with PAOK Thessaloniki.

On July 27, 2020, he transferred to the newly promoted team of Charilaos Trikoupis.

Chatzinikolas spent the next two seasons abroad with the Austrian club Oberwart Gunners and the German club Panthers Schwenningen.

In early 2023, Chatzinikolas returned to Greece with Kolossos Rodou. On July 13, 2023, he renewed his contract with Kolossos. On July 3, 2024, he renewed his contract with the island club once more.

On 30 August 2025, he signed with Tampereen Pyrintö in Finnish Korisliiga. On December 9, 2025, he returned to Greece and joined Doxa Lefkadas of the Greek Elite League. After winning the championship and gaining the promotion to the GBL, Chatzinikolas renewed his contract with the club for one more year.

== National team career ==
With the junior national teams of Greece, Chatzinikolas played at the 2013 FIBA Europe Under-18 Championship, and the 2015 FIBA Europe Under-20 Championship.
