= Tasos Spyropoulos =

Greek basketball player

Syllas Aidipsos
- Position: Power forward / center
- League: Greek C Basket League

Personal information
- Born: April 1, 1995 (age 31) Larissa, Greece
- Listed height: 6 ft 10 in (2.08 m)
- Listed weight: 235 lb (107 kg)

Career information
- Playing career: 2011–present

Career history
- 2011–2012: PAOK Thessaloniki
- 2012–2015: Panionios
- 2015–2016: Doukas
- 2016–2017: Gymnastikos Larissas
- 2017–2018: Holargos
- 2018–2022: Ermis Agias / Larisa
- 2022–2024: Mykonos
- 2024–2025: Niki Volos
- 2025–present: Syllas Aidipsos

Anastasios "Tasos" Spyropoulos (Greek: Αναστάσιος "Τάσος" Σπυρόπουλος; born April 1, 1995) is a Greek professional basketball player. He is a 2.08 m (6 ft 10 in) tall power forward-center.

== Professional career ==
Spyropoulos began his professional career on March 9, 2011, during the 2010–11 season, with the Greek Basket League club PAOK. He joined the first division Greek club Panionios in 2012, where he spent three seasons. He then played for Greek 2nd division club Doukas, in the 2015–16 season. He moved to the Greek 2nd division club Gymnastikos Larissas, for the 2016–17 season. He joined the Greek 2nd Division club Holargos, for the 2017–18 season.

From 2018 to 2022, Spyropoulos played for Larisa (formerly known as Ermis Agias). During the 2021-2022 campaign, in 16 league games, he averaged 1.4 points and 1.3 rebounds, playing around 6 minutes per contest. In July 2022, Spyropoulos moved to Mykonos and signed with the local club, following his former coach Giannis Tzimas.

== National team career ==
With the junior national teams of Greece, Spyropoulos played at the 2011 FIBA Europe Under-16 Championship, the 2013 FIBA Europe Under-18 Championship, and the 2015 FIBA Europe Under-20 Championship.
