= Christian Sengfelder =

German basketball player (born 1995)

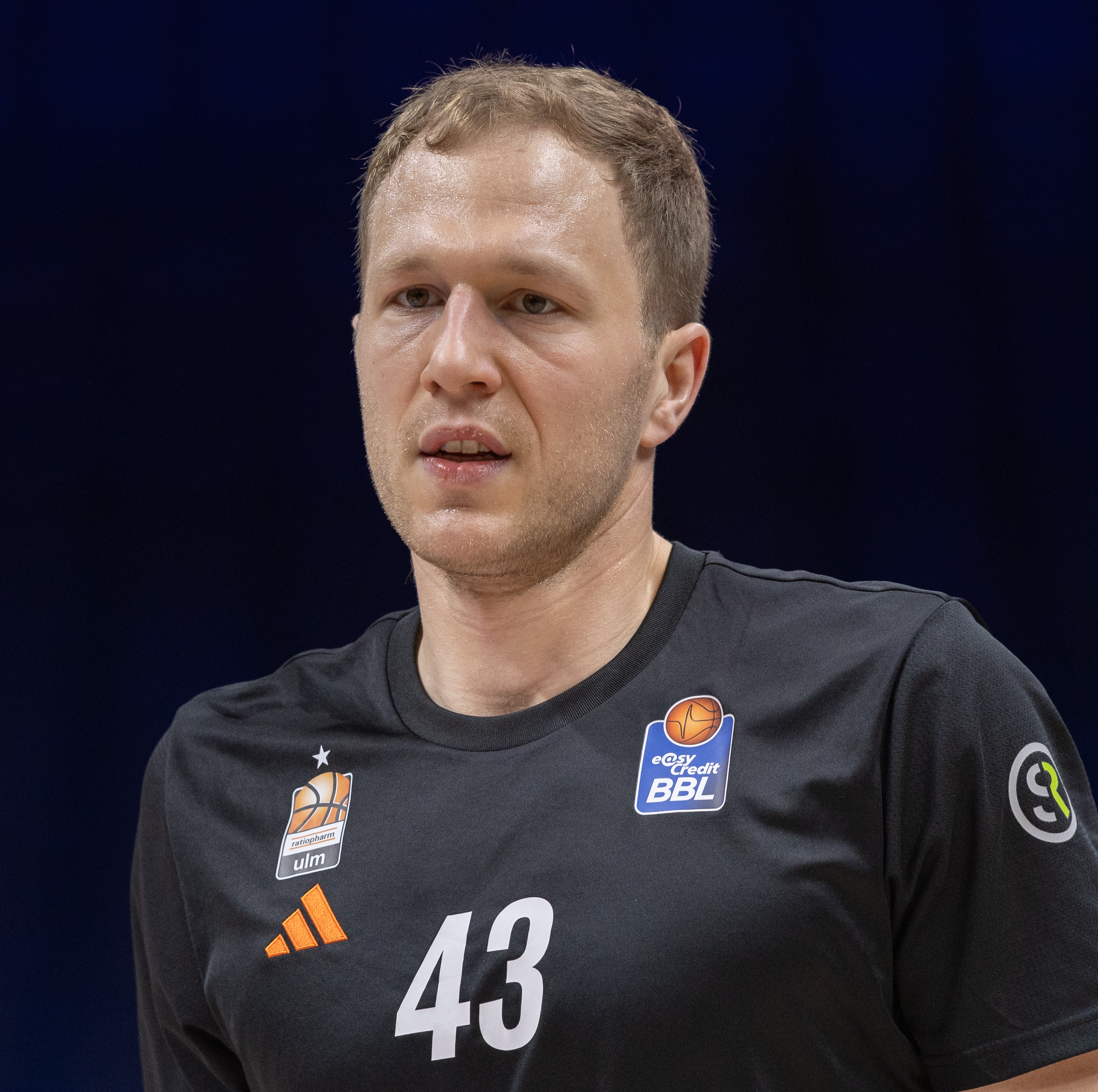

No. 43 – San Pablo Burgos
- Position: Center / power forward
- League: Liga ACB; EuroCup

Personal information
- Born: 28 February 1995 (age 31) Leverkusen, Germany
- Listed height: 2.03 m (6 ft 8 in)
- Listed weight: 108 kg (238 lb)

Career information
- College: Fordham (2014–2017); Boise State (2017–2018)
- NBA draft: 2018: undrafted
- Playing career: 2013–present

Career history
- 2013: Bayer Leverkusen
- 2013–2014: Ehingen Urspring
- 2018–2019: Löwen Braunschweig
- 2019–2023: Bamberg Baskets
- 2023–2024: Telekom Baskets Bonn
- 2024–2025: JDA Dijon
- 2025–2026: Ratiopharm Ulm
- 2026–present: San Pablo Burgos
Medals
Men's basketball
Representing Germany
EuroBasket
| Bronze medal – third place | 2022 Czech Republic–Georgia–Italy–Germany |

Christian Sengfelder (born 28 February 1995) is a German professional basketball player for San Pablo Burgos of the Spanish Liga ACB and the EuroCup. A power forward and center, he played college basketball for the Fordham Rams and the Boise State Broncos.

== College career ==
Prior to the 2014–15 season, Sengfelder joined the Fordham Rams on a basketball scholarship. He went on to play three years for Fordham, where he averaged 11.4 points and 5.8 rebounds per game. Following his junior year, Sengfelder left Fordham as a graduate transfer, to join Boise State University. In his lone season with Boise State, he averaged 11.7 points and 6.4 rebounds per game.

== Professional career ==
Sengfelder began his basketball career, with the youth team of his hometown club Bayer Leverkusen. Before the 2013–14 campaign, he moved to club Ehingen Urspring for one season, before he went on to play college basketball in the United States. At the conclusion of his collegiate career, Sengfelder returned to Germany, and signed with club Löwen Braunschweig for the 2018–19 season.

In June 2019, Sengfelder left Löwen Braunschweig, and signed a three-year contract with club Brose Bamberg. In May 2022, Sengfelder as team captain, signed a contract extension with Bamberg until 2025. However, a year into his extension, Sengfelder and Bamberg agreed to mutually part ways.

After being released from Bamberg, Sengfelder signed a two-year contract with Telekom Baskets Bonn, heading into the 2023–24 season. Following his only season with Bonn, Sengfelder departed from the club with a year left on his contract, to sign with LNB Pro A side JDA Dijon for the 2024–25 season.

On 2 July 2025, Sengfelder signed a two-year contract with club Ratiopharm Ulm ahead of the 2025–26 season.

On 23 July 2026, he signed with San Pablo Burgos of the Liga ACB.

== National team career ==
Sengfelder's first opportunity to represent Germany on the international stage, came on the youth level, at the 2013 FIBA U18 European Championship Division B. During the tournament for the Germany U18 national team, Sengfelder averaged 8.7 points and 4.6 rebounds per game.

Two years later, Sengfelder was selected to the Germany U20 national team for the 2015 FIBA U20 European Championship. He would finish the competition leading the team in scoring at 10.4 points, and rebounding at 6.4 per game.

In February 2019, Sengfelder was called up to the senior Germany national team for the first time. He was named to the team for Germany's final two matches of their 2019 FIBA World Cup qualifying campaign.

Three years later, Sengfelder was selected to represent Germany at the EuroBasket 2022, where he helped Germany win bronze, averaging 7.3 points and 1.7 rebounds per game during the tournament.

== Personal life ==
In November 2020, a biography chronicling the life and basketball career of Sengfelder was published.
