= Daniel Mayr =

German basketball player

No. 42 – ART Giants Düsseldorf
- Position: Center
- League: ProA

Personal information
- Born: July 28, 1995 (age 30) Bonn, Germany
- Listed height: 2.18 m (7 ft 2 in)
- Listed weight: 116 kg (256 lb)

Career information
- Playing career: 2014–present

Career history
- 2008–2014: Science City Jena
- 2014–2016: Bayern Munich
- 2016–2018: Fraport Skyliners
- 2019–2022: EN Baskets Schwelm
- 2022-2023: Panthers Schwenningen
- 2023-present: ART Giants Düsseldorf

Daniel Benjamin Mayr (born July 28, 1995) is a German professional basketball player who plays for ART Giants Düsseldorf of the ProA. Standing at 2.18 m (7 ft 2 in), he plays at the center position.

== Professional career ==
=== Early years ===
He made his first tries on the basketball pitch with the Dragons Rhöndorf. Being 11 years old, he already stood an impressing 1.78 m (5 ft 10 in). In 2008, he moved to Science City Jena. He stayed in the club for six seasons and played in various leagues.

=== Bayern Munich ===
On July 17, 2014, he signed a four-year contract with Bayern Munich and primarily played for the club's development squad in the third division (ProB).

=== Fraport Skyliners ===
On July 6, 2016, he signed with Fraport Skyliners.

=== EN Baskets Schwelm ===
On May 6, 2019, he signed with EN Baskets Schwelm of the German 3rd tier ProB.

=== wiha Panthers Schwenningen ===
On June 28, 2022, he signed with Panthers Schwenningen of the German 2nd tier ProA.

=== ART Giants Düsseldorf ===
On January 10, 2023, he signed with ART Giants Düsseldorf of the German 2nd tier ProA.

== Career statistics ==
Legend
| GP | Games played | GS | Games started | MPG | Minutes per game |
| FG% | Field-goal percentage | 3P% | 3-point field-goal percentage | FT% | Free-throw percentage |
| RPG | Rebounds per game | APG | Assists per game | SPG | Steals per game |
| BPG | Blocks per game | PPG | Points per game | PIR | Performance index rating |
| **Bold** | Career high |

=== EuroLeague ===
| Year | Team | GP | GS | MPG | FG% | 3P% | FT% | RPG | APG | SPG | BPG | PPG | PIR |
|---|---|---|---|---|---|---|---|---|---|---|---|---|---|
| 2015–16 | FC Bayern Munich | **0** | **1** | **15.5** | **.500** | **.000** | **.250** | **2.0** | **.0** | **.0** | **.0** | **1.0** | **.0** |
| **Career** | | 0 | 1 | 15.5 | .500 | .000 | .000 | 2.0 | .0 | .0 | .0 | 1.0 | .0 |

=== BARMER 2. Basketball Bundesliga ProA ===
| Year | Team | GP | GS | MPG | FG% | 3P% | FT% | RPG | APG | SPG | BPG | PPG | PIR |
|---|---|---|---|---|---|---|---|---|---|---|---|---|---|
| 2022–2023 | wiha Panthers Schwenningen | **15** | **na** | **17:19** | **.565** | **.000** | **.424** | **3.9** | **.4** | **.3** | **.8** | **4.4** | **5.7** |
| **Career** | | 15 | na | 17:19 | .565 | .000 | .424 | 3.9 | .4 | .3 | .8 | 4.4 | 5.7 |

== Personal ==
He is the son of former basketball player Rolf "Bibo" Mayr who stands 7 ft 4 in (2.24 m) tall and who won three caps for the German Men's National Team in 1989.
