= Antreas Christodoulou =

Cypriot-Greek basketball player

Andreas Christodoulou
AEL Limassol
- Position: Shooting guard / small forward
- League: Cyprus Basketball Division A

Personal information
- Born: February 22, 1995 (age 31) Limassol, Cyprus
- Listed height: 6 ft 6 in (1.98 m)
- Listed weight: 220 lb (100 kg)

Career information
- Playing career: 2013–present

Career history
- 2013–2015: Olympiacos
- 2015–2016: Koroivos Amaliadas
- 2016–2020: Rethymno Cretan Kings
- 2020–2021: Promitheas Patras
- 2021–2022: PAOK Thessaloniki
- 2022–2025: AEK Larnacas
- 2025–present: AEL Limassol B.C.

Career highlights
- FIBA Intercontinental Cup champion (2013); Greek League champion (2015); Greek Super Cup winner (2020); Cypriot Cup winner (2023); Cypriot League All-Star (2022)

Andreas Christodoulou (alternate spelling: Antreas) (Greek: Ανδρέας Χριστοδούλου; born February 22, 1995) is a Greek Cypriot professional basketball player for AEL Limassol B.C. of the Cypriot League. He is a 1.98 m (6 ft 6 in) in) tall swingman. He can also play at the point guard position, if needed.

== Professional career ==
Christodoulou played with the youth clubs of AEL Limassol and APOEL in Cyprus, before moving to Greece, where he played in the Greek minors with Mantoulidis.

He began his pro career after signing a five-year contract with the EuroLeague champions at the time, Olympiacos, in 2013. With Olympiacos, he won the FIBA Intercontinental Cup in 2013 and the Greek Basket League championship in 2015.

He was loaned to Koroivos for the 2015–16 season. On July 21, 2016, Christodoulou signed a two-year contract with the Rethymno Cretan Kings.

After a fruitful four-year stint with Rethymno, Christodoulou signed with EuroCup side Promitheas on July 20, 2020.

On July 14, 2021, Christodoulou moved to Thessaloniki, signing with PAOK. In 21 games, he averaged 4.4 points, 1.5 rebounds and 0.8 assists, playing around 14 minutes per contest.

On June 20, 2022, Christodoulou returned to Cyprus, signing a three-year deal with AEK Larnacas.

== National team career ==
Christodoulou has been a member of the junior national teams of Cyprus and Greece. With Greece's junior national team, he played at the 2014 FIBA Europe Under-20 Championship, and the 2015 FIBA Europe Under-20 Championship.

He is currently a member of the Cyprus men's national basketball team.

== Domestic leagues ==
| Season | Team | League | GP | MPG | FG% | 3P% | FT% | RPG | APG | SPG | BPG | PPG |
|---|---|---|---|---|---|---|---|---|---|---|---|---|
| 2013–14 | Olympiacos | GBL | 7 | 6.4 | .667 | .168 | .0 | 0.3 | .3 | .0 | .1 | 1.5 |
| 2014–15 | Olympiacos | GBL | 15 | 3.4 | .429 | .200 | .750 | .7 | .1 | .0 | .3 | .8 |
| 2015–16 | Koroivos | GBL | 22 | 12.6 | .429 | .208 | .692 | 1.6 | .6 | .3 | .2 | 4.0 |
| 2016–17 | Rethymno | GBL | 31 | 20.1 | .509 | .263 | .721 | 2.0 | 1.6 | .8 | .3 | 6.5 |
| 2017–18 | Rethymno | GBL | 24 | 20.0 | .417 | .340 | .760 | 1.5 | 1.5 | 1.3 | .5 | 7.4 |
| 2018–19 | Rethymno | GBL | 22 | 22.4 | .435 | .386 | .655 | 2.1 | 1.4 | .0 | .3 | 8.7 |

== Awards and accomplishments ==
- FIBA Intercontinental Cup Champion: (2013)
- Greek League Champion: (2015)
- Greek Super Cup Champion: (2020)
