= Rolands Šmits =

Latvian basketball player

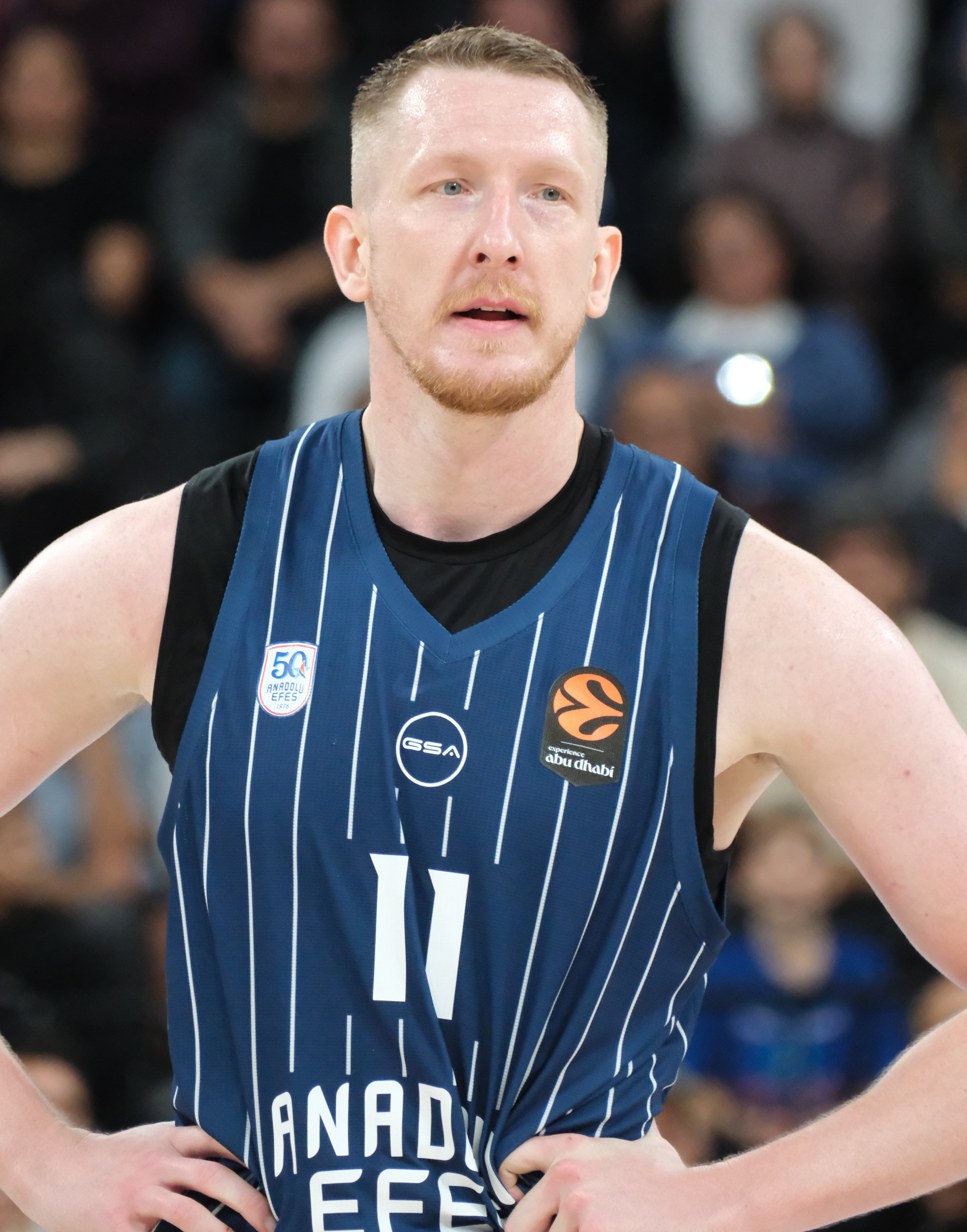
- Šmits with Anadolu Efes in 2026

No. 11 – Baskonia
- Position: Power forward / center
- League: Liga ACB; EuroLeague

Personal information
- Born: June 25, 1995 (age 31) Valmiera, Latvia
- Listed height: 6 ft 10 in (2.08 m)
- Listed weight: 235 lb (107 kg)

Career information
- NBA draft: 2017: undrafted
- Playing career: 2012–present

Career history
- 2012–2017: Fuenlabrada
- 2012–2013: →Óbila
- 2013–2014: →Fuenlabrada
- 2014–2015: →Getafe
- 2017–2022: FC Barcelona
- 2017–2018: →Fuenlabrada
- 2022–2024: Žalgiris Kaunas
- 2024–2026: Anadolu Efes
- 2026: Ningbo Rockets
- 2026–present: Baskonia

Career highlights
- EuroCup Rising Star (2017); Lithuanian League champion (2023); 2× King Mindaugas Cup winner (2023, 2024); Liga ACB champion (2021); 3× Copa del Rey winner (2019, 2021, 2022); Spanish League All-Young Players Team (2017)

Rolands Šmits (born June 25, 1995) is a Latvian professional basketball player for Baskonia of the Liga ACB and the EuroLeague. At a height of 2.08 m (6 ft 10 in), and a weight of 107 kg (235 lbs), he primarily plays at the power forward position, but can also play as small ball center.

== Early career ==
Šmits came up through the junior youth ranks of the Latvian club BK Valmiera. He left his native Latvia, for Spain in 2011. He joined the Spanish club Baloncesto Fuenlabrada, and played for their feeder team in the amateur Spanish fourth-tier level Liga EBA, in the 2011–12 season.

== Professional career ==
Šmits made his debut in the Spanish top-tier level Liga ACB, with Fuenlabrada, during the 2012–13 season, while also seeing action for Grupo Eulen Carrefour El Bulevar de Ávila, in the country’s third-tier division LEB Plata, that same season. From 2013 to 2015, he primarily played for Fuenlabrada's reserve team in LEB Plata sides Fundación Baloncesto Fuenlabrada and the affiliated team Viten Getafe respectively. But, he also earned increasing playing minutes in the top-tier level ACB.

In the 2016–17 season, Šmits won the European-wide 2nd-tier level EuroCup's Rising Star Award, after shooting 55.1% from the field overall, 60.4% from 2 point field goal range, and 48.8% from 3 point field goal range, while averaging 9.4 points, 2.8 rebounds, 0.9 assists, and 0.6 steals per game, with Fuenlabrada during the EuroCup season.

On 18 September 2017, Šmits signed a five-year contract with FC Barcelona, but stayed on loan at Fuenlabrada until the summer of 2018. On 30 June 2022, Šmits parted ways with Barcelona after his contract with the club expired. Over four seasons with Barça from 2018 to 2022, Šmits averaged 4.6 points and 2.8 rebounds in the EuroLeague, along with 5.2 points and 2.6 rebounds in the Liga ACB, mostly serving as a backup for Nikola Mirotić.

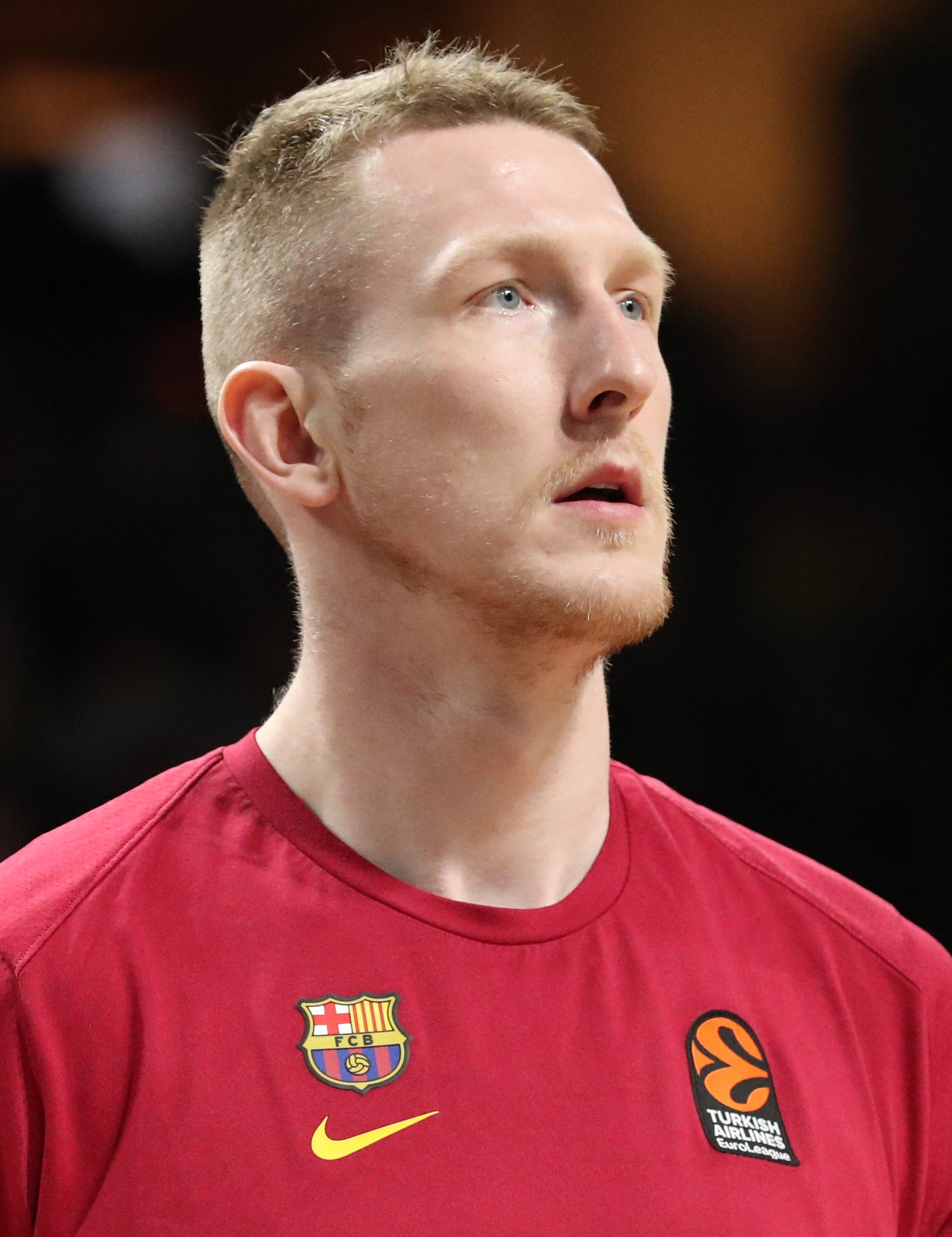
Šmits with FC Barcelona in 2022

On 3 July 2022, Šmits signed a two-year contract with Žalgiris Kaunas of the LKL and the EuroLeague. On 25 May 2023, Šmits agreed on a three-year contract extension until 2026, with opt-out clauses after each season.

On June 15, 2024, he signed with Anadolu Efes of the Turkish Basketbol Süper Ligi. On 15 June 2026, Šmits parted ways with Anadolu Efes after the club announced his departure.

On 24 August 2026, Šmits signed with the Ningbo Rockets of the Chinese Basketball Association (CBA). On 10 November, he was released after appearing in eight games in which the Rockets went 0–8.

On 11 November 2026, Šmits signed with Baskonia of the Liga ACB and the EuroLeague until the end of the season.

== International career ==
Šmits competed with Latvia's junior national teams at the 2011 FIBA Europe Under-16 Championship, and at the 2012 FIBA Europe Under-18 Championship and 2013 FIBA Europe Under-18 Championship. He also played with Latvia's junior national team at the 2014 FIBA Europe Under-20 Championship and at the 2015 FIBA Europe Under-20 Championship.

Šmits received his first cap with the senior men's Latvian national basketball team in 2014. In 2017, Šmits competed with the Latvian national team at the EuroBasket 2017 tournament, averaging 5.6 points and 2.0 rebounds as the team finished 5th overall.

== Awards and accomplishments ==
=== Club ===
FC Barcelona

- Liga ACB: (2021)
- 3× Copa del Rey: (2019, 2021, 2022)

Žalgiris Kaunas

- Lithuanian League: (2023)
- King Mindaugas Cup: (2023)

=== Individual ===
- EuroCup Rising Star: (2017)
- Spanish League All-Young Players Team: (2017)

== Career statistics ==
Legend
GP	Games played	GS	Games started	MPG	Minutes per game
FG%	Field-goal percentage	3P%	3-point field-goal percentage	FT%	Free-throw percentage
RPG	Rebounds per game	APG	Assists per game	SPG	Steals per game
BPG	Blocks per game	PPG	Points per game	PIR	Performance index rating
**Bold**	Career high

=== EuroLeague ===
*	Led the league

Year	Team	GP	GS	MPG	FG%	3P%	FT%	RPG	APG	SPG	BPG	PPG	PIR
2018–19	Barcelona	14	0	11.5	.389	.370	.909	1.6	.5	.3	**.2**	4.4	3.5
2019–20	Barcelona	16	10	9.9	.442	**.474**	.750	1.8	.3	.1	.1	3.1	2.2
2020–21	Barcelona	**41***	8	15.9	**.573**	.396	.767	3.2	.6	.4	**.2**	5.5	6.0
2021–22	Barcelona	36	3	14.8	.477	.196	**.920**	3.1	.6	.4	.1	4.4	4.8
2022–23	Žalgiris	37	**36**	**23.3**	.491	.383	.855	**4.7**	1.1	.4	.1	9.7	9.4
2023–24	Žalgiris	31	24	22.9	.512	.375	.773	4.3	**1.2**	**.6**	.1	**10.5**	**10.5**
Career		175	81	17.6	.500	.361	.824	3.5	.8	.4	.1	6.7	6.7
