= Emircan Koşut =

Turkish basketball player (born 1995)

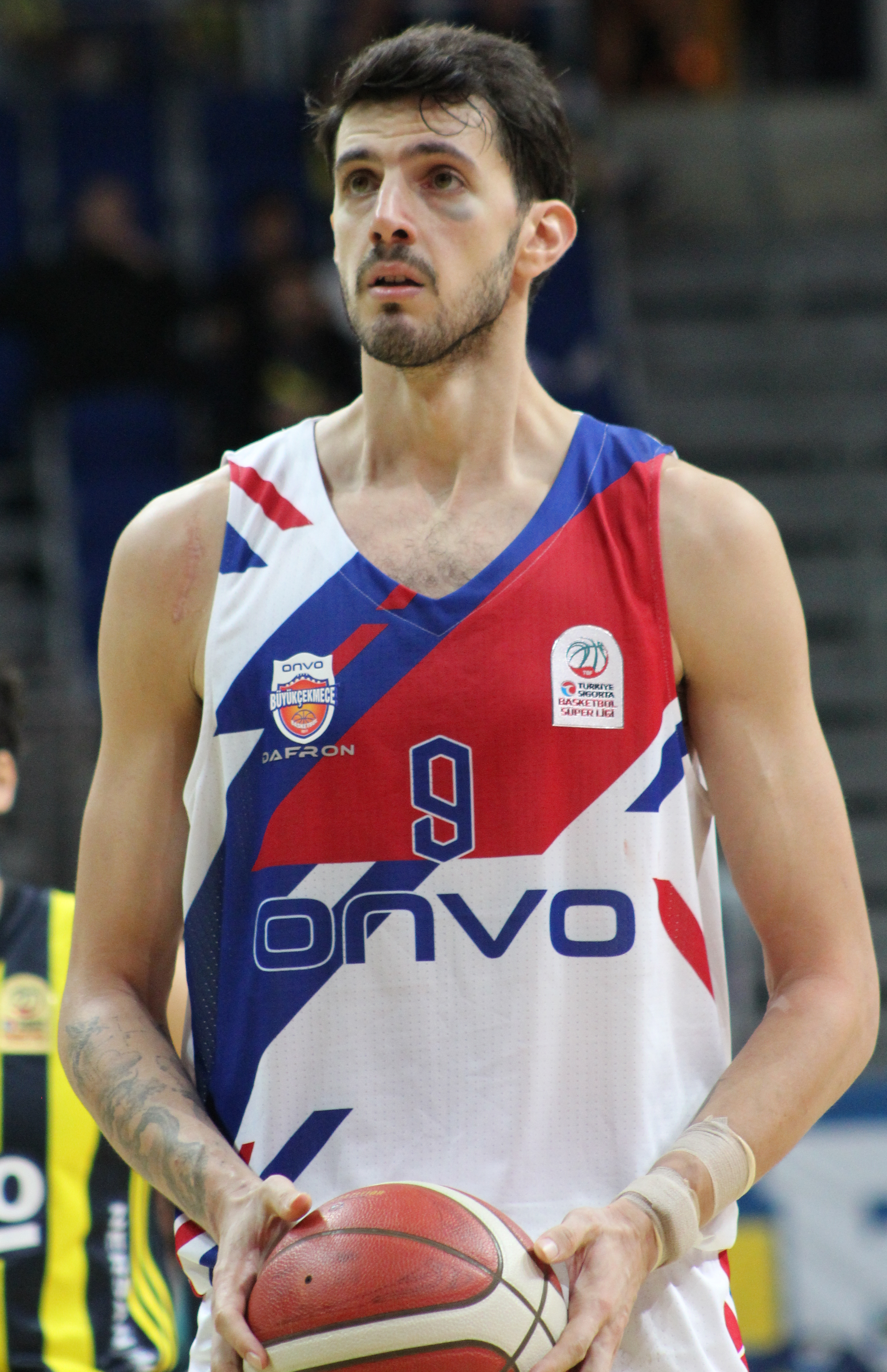

No. 9 – Türk Telekom
- Position: Center / power forward
- League: Basketbol Süper Ligi

Personal information
- Born: 3 July 1995 (age 31) Gaziosmanpaşa, Istanbul, Turkey
- Listed height: 7 ft 1 in (2.16 m)
- Listed weight: 220 lb (100 kg)

Career information
- NBA draft: 2017: undrafted
- Playing career: 2011–present

Career history
- 2011–2016: Anadolu Efes
- 2016–2017: Yeşilgiresun Belediye
- 2017–2021: Darüşşafaka
- 2021–2022: Merkezefendi Bld. Denizli Basket
- 2022–2023: Türk Telekom
- 2023–2025: Büyükçekmece Basketbol
- 2025–present: Türk Telekom

Career highlights
- EuroCup champion (2018)
Medals
Men's basketball
Representing Turkey
FIBA Europe Under-20 Championship
Gold medal – first place	2014 Greece	U20 team
Bronze medal – third place	2015 Italy	U20 team
FIBA Europe Under-18 Championship
Gold medal – first place	2013 Latvia	U18 team

Emircan Koşut (born 3 July 1995) is a Turkish professional basketball player for Türk Telekom of the Turkish Basketbol Süper Ligi (BSL). He plays at the center and power forward positions.

== Professional career ==
=== Early years ===
Koşut was born in Gaziosmanpaşa, Istanbul. He started playing basketball in Bayrampaşa Sancak team when he was ten. In 2011, he moved to the Anadolu Efes junior team.

=== Anadolu Efes ===
In the first year, he played for the junior and youth teams of Efes. He was loaned for the 2012–13 season to TB2L team Pertevniyal which is the pilot club of Anadolu Efes. In the summer of 2014, Koşut moved to Anadolu Efes first team. He was released from the team on 20 June 2016.

== Individual awards ==
- 2015 FIBA Europe Under-20 Championship: All-Tournament Team
