= Stefan Lakić =

Bosnian basketball player

Borac Banja Luka
- Position: Small forward
- League: Bosnian Championship; Second ABA League

Personal information
- Born: 12 January 1995 (age 31) Užice, Serbia, Yugoslavia
- Listed height: 2.01 m (6 ft 7 in)
- Listed weight: 100 kg (220 lb)

Career information
- College: Odessa (2015–2016); Missouri State WP (2016–2017); Samford (2017–2019)
- NBA draft: 2019: undrafted
- Playing career: 2009–present

Career history
- 2011–2013: Varda HE
- 2013–2014: Sloboda Užice
- 2014–2015: Varda HE
- 2019–2020: Leotar
- 2020–2021: Mladost Mrkonjić Grad
- 2021: Gostivar 2015
- 2021–2022: FMP
- 2022–present: Borac Banja Luka

Stefan Lakić (Serbian Cyrillic: Стефан Лакић; born 12 January 1995) is a Bosnian professional basketball player for Borac Banja Luka of the Championship of Bosnia and Herzegovina and the Second ABA League.

== College career ==
Lakić began his collegiate career at Odessa College in Texas. He played in the 2015–16 season where he averaged 2.8 points per game as a freshman. In his sophomore year he played for Missouri State–West Plains averaging 13.9 points and 6.2 rebounds per game. In 2017, Lakić joined Samford University. As a junior, he appeared in all 32 games, including 6 starts, in the Bulldogs' 2017–18 season averaging 4.4 points and 1.8 rebounds per game. As a senior, he appeared in 31 games, including 2 starts in their 2018–19 season averaging 1.8 points and 1.7 rebounds per game.

== Playing career ==
Lakić grew up with Varda HE and played one season in Serbia for Sloboda Užice (2013–14) before he went in September 2015 to the United States where he planned to play college basketball. After went undrafted at the 2019 NBA draft, Lakić moved back to Bosnia where he played for Leotar (2019–20) and Mladost Mrkonjić Grad (2020–21).

In April 2021, Lakić signed a contract with Gostivar 2015 for the rest of the 2020–21 season. In June 2021, Lakić signed a contract with FMP.

== National team career ==
In July 2013, Lakić was a member of the Bosnia and Herzegovina under-18 national team that participated at the FIBA Europe Under-18 Championship in Latvia. Over nine tournament games, he averaged 8.6 points, 4.2 rebounds, and 1.3 assists per game. In July 2015, Lakić was a member of the Bosnia and Herzegovina under-20 national team that participated at the FIBA Europe Under-20 Championship in Italy. Over nine tournament games, he averaged 8.1 points and four rebounds per game.
