= Adam Pecháček =

Czech basketball player

No. 0 – Sluneta Ústí nad Labem
- Position: Power forward
- League: NBL

Personal information
- Born: 19 February 1995 (age 31) Prague, Czech Republic
- Listed height: 6 ft 9 in (2.06 m)
- Listed weight: 220 lb (100 kg)

Career history
- 2011–2014: Virtus Bologna
- 2014–2016: Pallacanestro Reggiana
- 2016: AZS Koszalin
- 2016–2018: Obradoiro CAB
- 2018: Araberri BC
- 2018: Mitteldeutscher BC
- 2019–2020: Phoenix Hagen
- 2020–2021: PS Karlsruhe Lions
- 2021–2022: Artland Dragons
- 2022–2023: Medipolis SC Jena
- 2023–2024: Opava
- 2024–2025: Děčín
- 2025–2026: Sluneta Ústí nad Labem
- 2026–present: Lokomotive Bernau

Adam Pecháček (born 19 February 1995) is a Czech basketball player for Lokomotive Bernau of the German ProB and the Czech national team.

== Early life and youth career ==
Born in Prague, Czech Republic, Pecháček developed as a promising talent in youth basketball circuits. He began playing basketball at an early age and joined the Czech youth national teams, where he showcased his potential in several FIBA junior competitions.

== Professional career ==
Pecháček started his professional career in 2011 with Virtus Bologna in the Italian Lega Basket Serie A, making his debut as a teenager.

In 2014, he transferred to Pallacanestro Reggiana where he played for two seasons and gained EuroCup experience.

Pecháček moved to AZS Koszalin in Poland in 2016 for a brief stint before joining Obradoiro CAB in the Spanish Liga ACB, widely regarded as one of the top domestic leagues in Europe.

After a short stop at Araberri BC, he signed with Mitteldeutscher BC in Germany's Basketball Bundesliga in 2018.

Pecháček had a productive season with Phoenix Hagen in the German ProA league during 2019–20, averaging 13.5 points, 5.0 rebounds, and 1.1 assists per game.

On October 14, 2020, he signed with the PS Karlsruhe Lions.

He continued his career in Germany with Artland Dragons, signing on July 27, 2021. In the 2022–23 season, he played for Medipolis SC Jena before returning to the Czech Republic.

Pecháček joined BK Opava in 2023 and helped the team reach the NBL semifinals. In 2024, he signed with BK Děčín.

== National team career ==
Pecháček has been a regular member of Czech youth national teams and made his senior debut in the mid-2010s. He was part of the Czech Republic squad for EuroBasket 2017, where he appeared in group stage games.

== Career statistics ==
=== Club (selected seasons) ===
- 2019–20 (Phoenix Hagen): 13.5 PPG, 5.0 RPG, 1.1 APG
- 2020–21 (PS Karlsruhe Lions): 12.7 PPG, 5.4 RPG
