= Nedim Buza =

Bosnian basketball player

No. 14 – Spars Ilidža
- Position: Small forward
- League: Bosnian League

Personal information
- Born: May 10, 1995 (age 31) Visoko, Bosnia and Herzegovina
- Listed height: 6 ft 8 in (2.03 m)
- Listed weight: 210 lb (95 kg)

Career information
- NBA draft: 2017: undrafted
- Playing career: 2011–present

Career history
- 2011–2015: Spars
- 2011–2013: →Spars II
- 2015–2019: Oostende
- 2019–2021: Spars
- 2021: Čelik Zenica
- 2021–present: Spars

Career highlights
- 2× Belgian League champion (2016, 2017); 2× Belgian Cup winner (2016, 2017); Bosnian Cup winner (2020)

Nedim Buza (born May 10, 1995) is a Bosnian professional basketball player for Spars Ilidža of the Bosnian League. Standing at 2.03 m (6 ft 8 in), he plays at the small forward position.

== Professional career ==
Buza started his career with Spars Sarajevo. On April 24, 2015, he announced that he would enter the 2015 NBA draft.

At the 2015 Nike Hoop Summit, Buza participated for the World Select Team (against the USA Select Team), and recorded 6 points.

On June 6, 2015, he signed with Belgian team Telenet Oostende.

On August 26, 2019, Buza signed for Spars Ilidža.

== Awards and accomplishments ==
=== Club ===
Oostende

- 2x Belgian League (2016, 2017)
- 2x Belgian Basketball Cup (2016, 2017)

=== Bosnian national team ===
Junior national team

- 2014 FIBA Europe Under-20 Championship Division B: Gold

=== Individual ===
- 2013 Nike International Junior Tournament: All-Tournament Team
