= Jonas Grof =

German basketball player (born 1996)

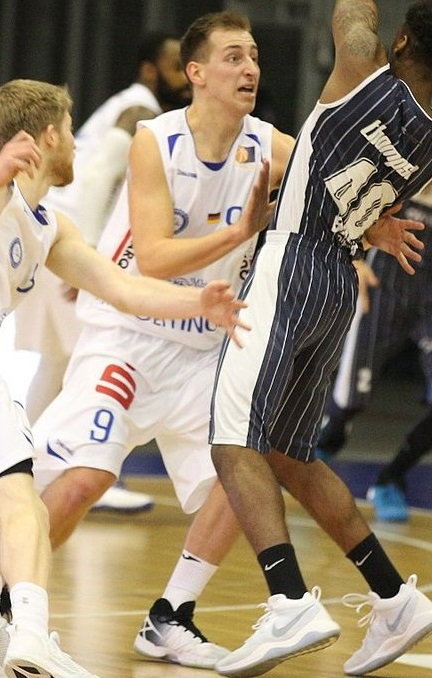

Free Agent
- Position: Point guard

Personal information
- Born: 3 May 1996 (age 30) Herdecke, Germany
- Listed height: 6 ft 7 in (2.01 m)

Career information
- High school: Lee Academy (Lee, Maine)
- Playing career: 2010–present

Career history
- 2010–2012: SV Boele Kabel
- 2012–2016: Iserlohn Kangaroos
- 2014–2016: Phoenix Hagen
- 2016–2017: Oettinger Rockets Gotha
- 2017–2020: Phoenix Hagen
- 2020–2022: Gladiators Trier
- 2022–2026: VFL Astrostars Bochum

Jonas Grof (born 3 May 1996) is a German professional basketball player who last played for VFL Astrostars Bochum of the German ProA league.
