= Vincent Kesteloot =

Belgian basketball player (born 1995)

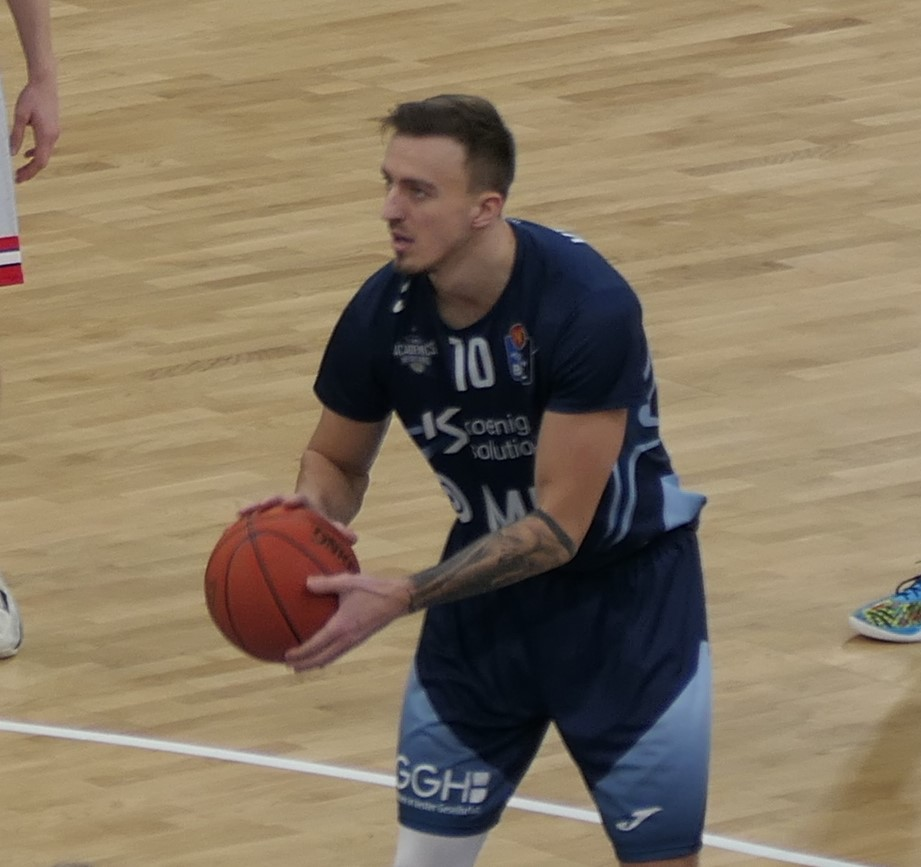
- Kesteloot with Academics Heidelberg in January 2023

No. 32 – Antwerp Giants
- Position: Power forward / small forward
- League: BNXT League

Personal information
- Born: 23 March 1995 (age 31) Antwerp, Belgium
- Listed height: 6 ft 7 in (2.01 m)
- Listed weight: 231 lb (105 kg)

Career information
- Playing career: 2014–present

Career history
- 2014–2016: Okapi Aalstar
- 2016–2019: Oostende
- 2019–2021: Antwerp Giants
- 2021–2022: Spirou
- 2022–2024: MLP Academics Heidelberg
- 2024–2025: Juventus Utena
- 2025–present: Antwerp Giants

Career highlights
- 4× PBL champion (2017–2019, 2025–26); 4× Belgian Cup champion (2017, 2018, 2020, 2026); PBL Most Promising Player (2015)

Vincent Kesteloot (born 23 March 1995) is a Belgian professional basketball player for Antwerp Giants of the BNXT League. Standing at 6 ft 7 in (2.01 m), he plays at the power forward and small forward positions.

== Professional career ==
Kesteloot started his professional career in 2014 with Okapi Aalstar. In his rookie season, he won the Belgian League Most Promising Player Award.

On 13 June 2016, Kesteloot signed a two-year deal with Oostende. On 17 June 2018, he extended his contract with one more year until 2019. With Oostende, Kesteloot won the Belgian Pro Basketball League three consecutive seasons.

On 2 July 2019, Kesteloot signed a two-year contract with Telenet Giants Antwerp.

On 1 September 2021, he signed with Spirou of the BNXT League.

On 1 October 2022, he signed with USC Heidelberg of the Basketball Bundesliga.

On 24 December 2024, Kesteloot signed with Juventus Utena of the Lithuanian Basketball League (LKL) for the rest of the season.

On August 26, 2025, he signed a two-month contract with Antwerp Giants of the BNXT League.

== International career ==
Kesteloot represented Belgium at the 2015 FIBA Europe Under-20 Championship.
