= Imran Polutak =

Professional basketball player

No. 28 – Sloboda Tuzla
- Position: Center
- League: Prvenstvo BiH

Personal information
- Born: 9 July 1996 (age 30) Aarau, Switzerland
- Listed height: 2.09 m (6 ft 10 in)
- Listed weight: 113 kg (249 lb)

Career information
- Playing career: 2014–present

Career history
- 2014–2017: Krka
- 2017: Zabok
- 2017–2018: Zlatorog
- 2018–2019: Gorica
- 2019–2022: Spars Realway
- 2022–2023: Alkar
- 2023–2024: OSE Lions
- 2024–2025: Rabotnički
- 2025: Golden Eagle Ylli
- 2025–2026: Dinamo Zagreb
- 2026–present: Sloboda Tuzla

Imran Polutak (born in Aarau, Switzerland, 9 July 1996) is a Bosnian professional basketball player for Sloboda Tuzla in the Basketball Championship of Bosnia and Herzegovina. Standing at 2.09 m (6' 10") and weighing 113kg (250 lbs), he plays the center position.

== Career ==
The basketball player embarked on their professional career in the 2014/15 season with KK Krka Novo Mesto, where they played for three seasons until 2016/17. Following this, they had a brief stint with KK Zabok for the 2016/17 season before moving to KK Zlatorog Lasko for the 2017/18 season. In 2018/19, the player continued their journey with KK Gorica. A significant phase of their career unfolded between 2019/20 and 2021/22, during which they played for KK Spars Realway. After leaving Spars Realway, they spent the 2022/23 season with KK Alkar. The following year, in 2023/24, the player joined OSE Lions. As of 2024, the player is currently a member of KK Rabotnicki.

Polutak was also a member of Bosnia and Herzegovina international program for some years. He played for Bosnia and Herzegovina Senior National Team back in 2016 and previously for U18 National Team in 2014. Polutak also represented Bosnia at the European Championships (FIBA EuroBasket) U20 Division B in Chalkida (Greece) eight years ago. His stats at that event were 5 games: 7.8ppg, 5.0rpg, 1.4apg, FGP: 42.5%, FT: 55.6%.
