= Ilias Theodoridis =

Greek basketball player

Ilias-Angelos Theodoridis
YMCA Thessaloniki
- Position: Point guard
- League: Greek B Basket League

Personal information
- Born: February 5, 1997 (age 29) Herakleion, Greece
- Listed height: 6 ft 4 in (1.93 m)
- Listed weight: 188 lb (85 kg)

Career information
- Playing career: 2015–present

Career history
- 2015–2018: Rethymno Cretan Kings
- 2018–present: KAO Korinthos

Ilias-Angelos Theodoridis (Greek: Ηλίας-Άγγελος Θεοδωρίδης; born February 5, 1997) is a Greek professional basketball player. He is a 1.96 m (6 ft 5 in) tall point guard.

== Pro career ==
Theodoridis started his basketball career in 2011 playing amateur basketball with Irakleio. He stayed at the club until 2016.

He signed his first professional contract with Rethymno Cretan Kings of the Greek Basket League on 2016. Theodoridis made his professional debut with Rethymno against Apollon Patras on October 10, 2015. He scored his first 5 points against Panathinaikos on February 1, 2016.
