= Leon Šantelj =

Slovenian basketball player

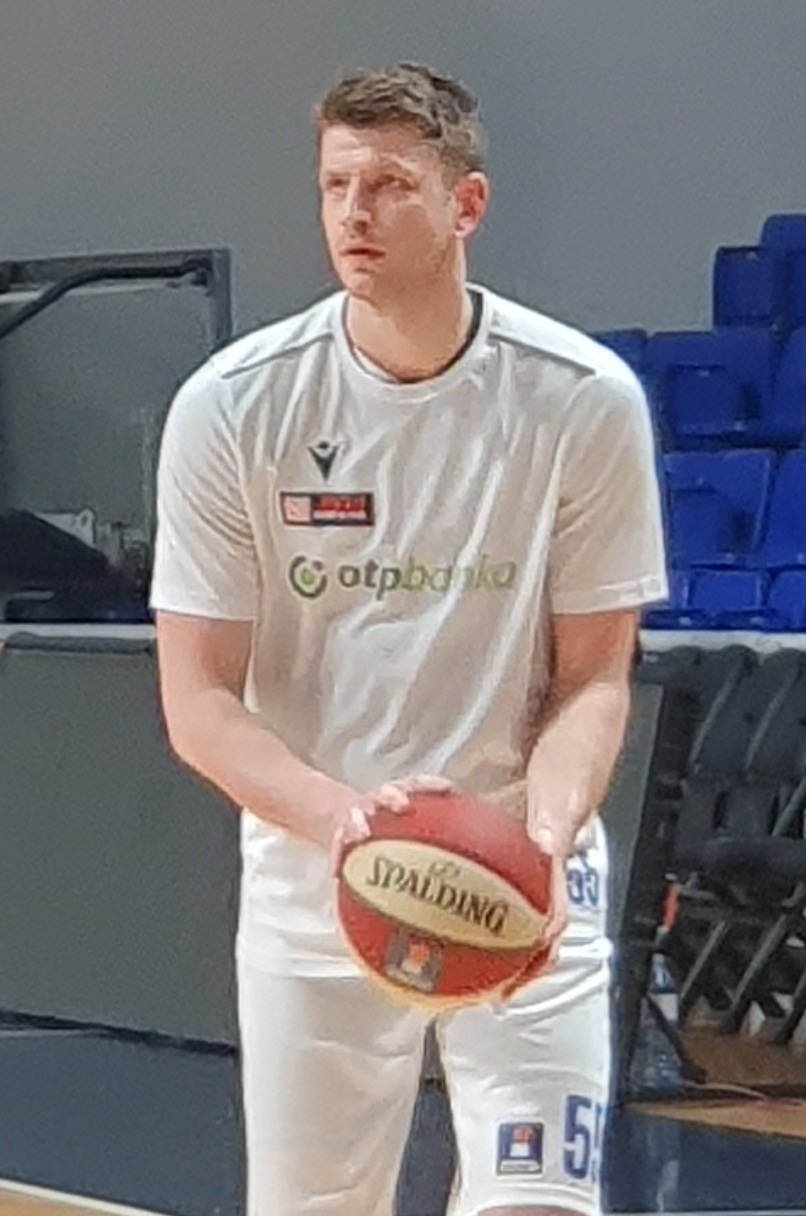

No. 55 – Belfius Mons-Hainaut
- Position: Power forward
- League: Belgian League

Personal information
- Born: April 25, 1995 (age 31) Postojna, Slovenia
- Listed height: 2.05 m (6 ft 9 in)

Career information
- NBA draft: 2017: undrafted
- Playing career: 2012–present

Career history
- 2012–2014: UKK Koper
- 2014–2016: Helios Suns
- 2016: → Plama Pur
- 2016–2019: Rogaška
- 2019–2020: Helios Suns
- 2020: Olomoucko
- 2020–2021: Rogaška
- 2021–2022: Helios Suns
- 2022–2023: Zadar
- 2023–present: Belfius Mons-Hainaut

Career highlights
- Croatian League champion (2023)

Leon Šantelj (born April 25, 1995) is a Slovenian professional basketball player for Belfius Mons-Hainaut of the Belgian League. He is a 2.05 m tall Power forward.

== Professional career ==
Šantelj began the 2020-21 season with BK Olomoucko of the Czech National Basketball League, averaging 9.0 points and 4.3 rebounds per game in six games. On November 1, 2020, he signed with Rogaška.

On 21 July 2022, Šantelj signed a one-year contract with Croatian club Zadar of the ABA League.

== National team career ==
Šantelj made his debut for the Slovenian national team on February 22, 2019, at the 2019 FIBA Basketball World Cup qualification game against Turkey national team.
