= Andrija Ćorić =

Croatian basketball player

Free agent
- Position: Forward

Personal information
- Born: February 1, 1995 (age 31) Antwerp, Belgium
- Listed height: 1.98 m (6 ft 6 in)
- Listed weight: 98 kg (216 lb)

Career information
- NBA draft: 2017: undrafted
- Playing career: 2011–present

Career history
- 2011–2016: Široki Brijeg
- 2016–2018: Cibona
- 2018–2019: Cedevita
Medals
Men's basketball
Representing Croatia
World U-17 Championship
Bronze medal – third place	2012 Lithuania	U-17 Team
FIBA Europe Under-18 Championship
Silver medal – second place	2013 Latvia	U-18 Team

Andrija Ćorić (born 1 February 1995) is a Croatian professional basketball player, currently playing as a forward.
