= Blaž Mesiček =

Slovenian basketball player (born 1997)

LTH Castings
- Position: Shooting guard
- League: 1. SKL

Personal information
- Born: June 12, 1997 (age 29) Ljubljana, Slovenia
- Listed height: 1.98 m (6 ft 6 in)
- Listed weight: 92 kg (203 lb)

Career information
- NBA draft: 2019: undrafted
- Playing career: 2014–present

Career history
- 2013–2016: Union Olimpija
- 2014–2015: → Škofja Loka
- 2016–2018: Enel Basket Brindisi
- 2018: Petrol Olimpija
- 2019: Pistoia Basket 2000
- 2019–2020: Mega Bemax
- 2020–2021: Split
- 2021: Kolossos Rodou
- 2022: OSE Lions
- 2022-2023: Cibona
- 2023: Zob Ahan Isfahan BC
- 2023: Fuenlabrada
- 2024-present: LTH Castings

Career highlights
- Croatian Cup winner (2023)

Blaž Mesiček (born June 12, 1997) is a Slovenian professional basketball player. Born in Ljubljana, Slovenia, he is a 1.98 m (6 ft 6 in) tall shooting guard.

== Playing career ==
He played for his hometown team LOGO Grosuplje and in the summer of 2013 moved to Slovenian powerhouse Union Olimpija where he played for the U-17 and U-19 teams. For the 2014–15 season, he was on loan with Slovenian second-tier club Škofja Loka. He was the best player on the team and one of the best scorer of the league, tallying 21.1 points per contest.

In the summer of 2015, he signed a pro contract with Union Olimpija and received quality minutes in the Adriatic League and the FIBA Eurocup. He was recognized by FIBA and attended the FIBA European U18 All-Star Game during the European Championship 2015 in Lille, France as one of the best 24 young players.

In December 2016, Mesiček signed with Enel Basket Brindisi of the Italian top tier Lega Basket Serie A (LBA).

On August 9, 2018, He signed a two-year contract with Petrol Olimpija. In December 2018, he parted ways with Petrol Olimpija

On January 30, 2019, Mesiček signed a 30-days contract with Pistoia Basket 2000. After his short stint in Italy, he signed for the Serbian team Mega Bemax for the 2019–20 season in October 2019. Mesicek averaged 8.1 points, 2.2 rebounds and 1.5 assists per game.

On October 3, 2020, he signed with Split of the ABA League and the Croatian League. He averaged 10.8 points, 2.6 rebounds and 3,1 assists in the Croatian league, as well as 11.1 points, 2.6 rebounds and 2.8 assists in the Adriatic League.

On July 8, 2021, Mesiček officially signed with Kolossos Rodou of the Greek Basket League. On October 23, he parted ways with the Greek club. In 3 games, he averaged 8.3 points and 2 rebounds per contest.
