= Petr Cornelie =

French-Czech basketball player

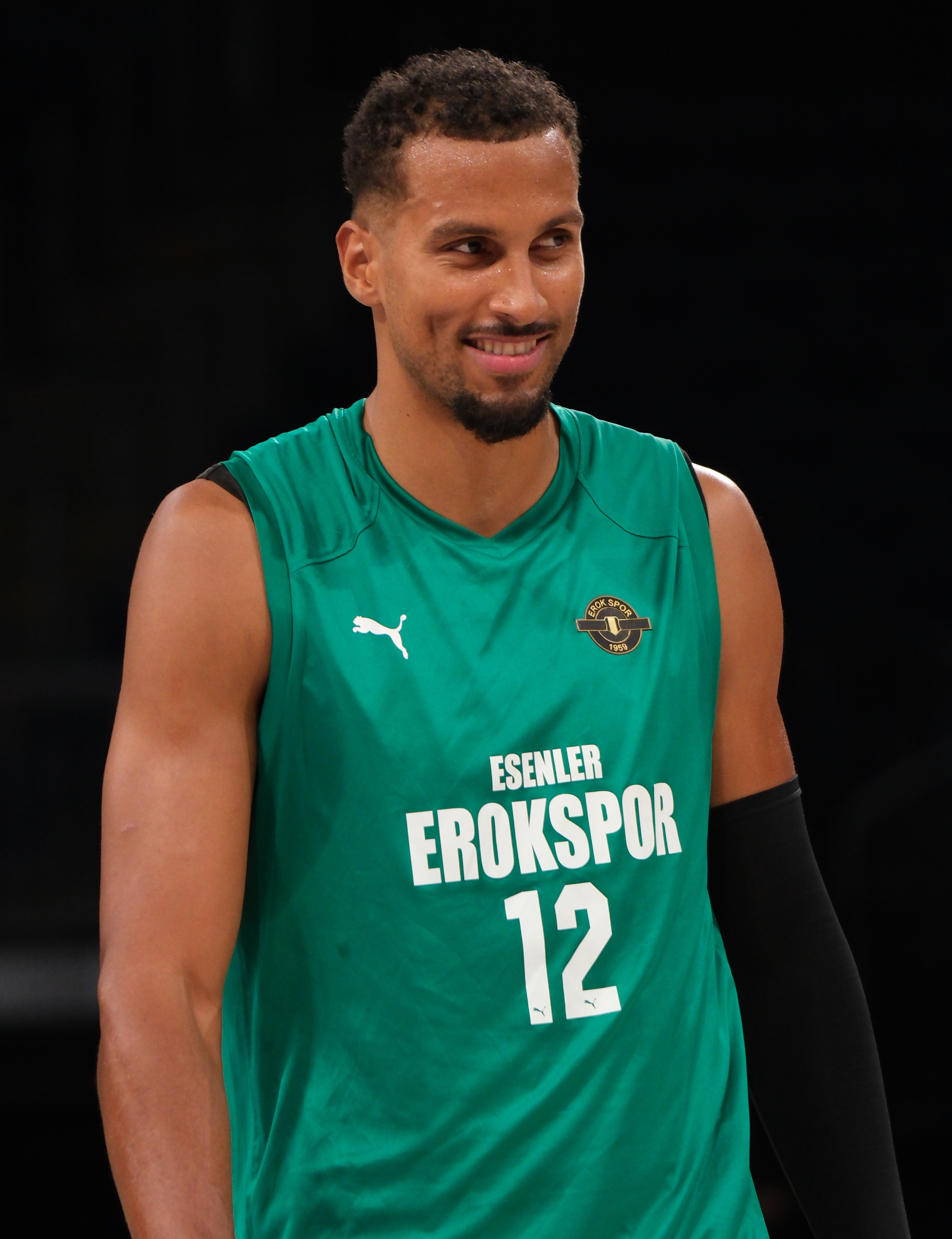
- Cornelie with Esenler Erokspor in 2025

No. 12 – Shanxi Loongs
- Position: Power forward / center
- League: CBA

Personal information
- Born: July 26, 1995 (age 31) Calais, France
- Listed height: 2.10 m (6 ft 11 in)
- Listed weight: 108 kg (238 lb)

Career information
- NBA draft: 2016: 2nd round, 53rd overall pick
- Drafted by: Denver Nuggets
- Playing career: 2013–present

Career history
- 2013–2019: Le Mans Sarthe
- 2017–2018: →Levallois Metropolitans
- 2019–2021: Élan Béarnais Pau-Orthez
- 2021–2022: Denver Nuggets
- 2021: →Grand Rapids Gold
- 2022: Grand Rapids Gold
- 2022–2023: Real Madrid
- 2023–2025: AS Monaco
- 2025–2026: Esenler Erokspor
- 2026–present: Shanxi Loongs

Career highlights
- EuroLeague champion (2023); Spanish Supercup winner (2022); NBA G League rebounding leader (2022); LNB Pro A champion (2024); French Cup winner (2016); French Leaders Cup winner (2014); LNB Pro A Best Young Player (2015)
- Stats at NBA.com
- Stats at Basketball Reference

Petr William Cornelie (born July 26, 1995) is a French-Czech professional basketball player for the Shanxi Loongs of the Chinese Basketball Association (CBA). He stands 2.10 m (6' 11") tall and plays both the power forward and center positions. Cornelie was selected in the second round of the 2016 NBA draft by the Denver Nuggets.

== Early life and career ==
Growing up in Alsace, Cornelie played in the youth ranks of Saint-Joseph Strasbourg, Basket Club Souffelweyersheim and Association sportive d'Electricité de Strasbourg.

== Professional career ==
=== Le Mans Sarthe (2013–2019) ===
At the age of 15, Cornelie joined the youth academy of Le Mans Sarthe Basket. He made his debut on Le Mans' men's team during the 2013–14 season and became a regular on the team the following season. In the 2014–15 season he won the Pro A Rising Star award.

On June 13, 2016, Cornelie was one of 13 different international underclassmen (including one of four other Frenchmen) to enter their names for the 2016 NBA draft. Cornelie was eventually picked by the Denver Nuggets 53rd pick and joined them for the 2016 NBA Summer League. He remained at Le Mans for the 2016–17 campaign. After a disappointing season, in which he averaged 4.1 points and 2.9 rebounds a game for Le Mans, Cornelie joined another Pro A club, the Levallois Metropolitans, on loan in June 2017.

=== Pau-Orthez (2019–2021) ===
On June 20, 2019, Cornelie signed a deal with Élan Béarnais Pau-Orthez of the French LNB Pro A.

=== Denver Nuggets (2021–2022) ===
On September 17, 2021, Cornelie signed a two-way contract with the Denver Nuggets. Under the terms of the deal, he split time between the Nuggets and their NBA G League affiliate, the Grand Rapids Gold. On January 9, 2022, he was waived by the Nuggets.

=== Grand Rapids Gold (2022) ===
On January 15, 2022, Cornelie was acquired via returning player rights by the Grand Rapids Gold.

=== Real Madrid (2022–2023) ===
On July 27, 2022, Cornelie returned to Europe, signing a one-year contract with EuroLeague powerhouse Real Madrid. On June 26, 2023, he parted ways with the Spanish club.

=== AS Monaco (2023–2025) ===
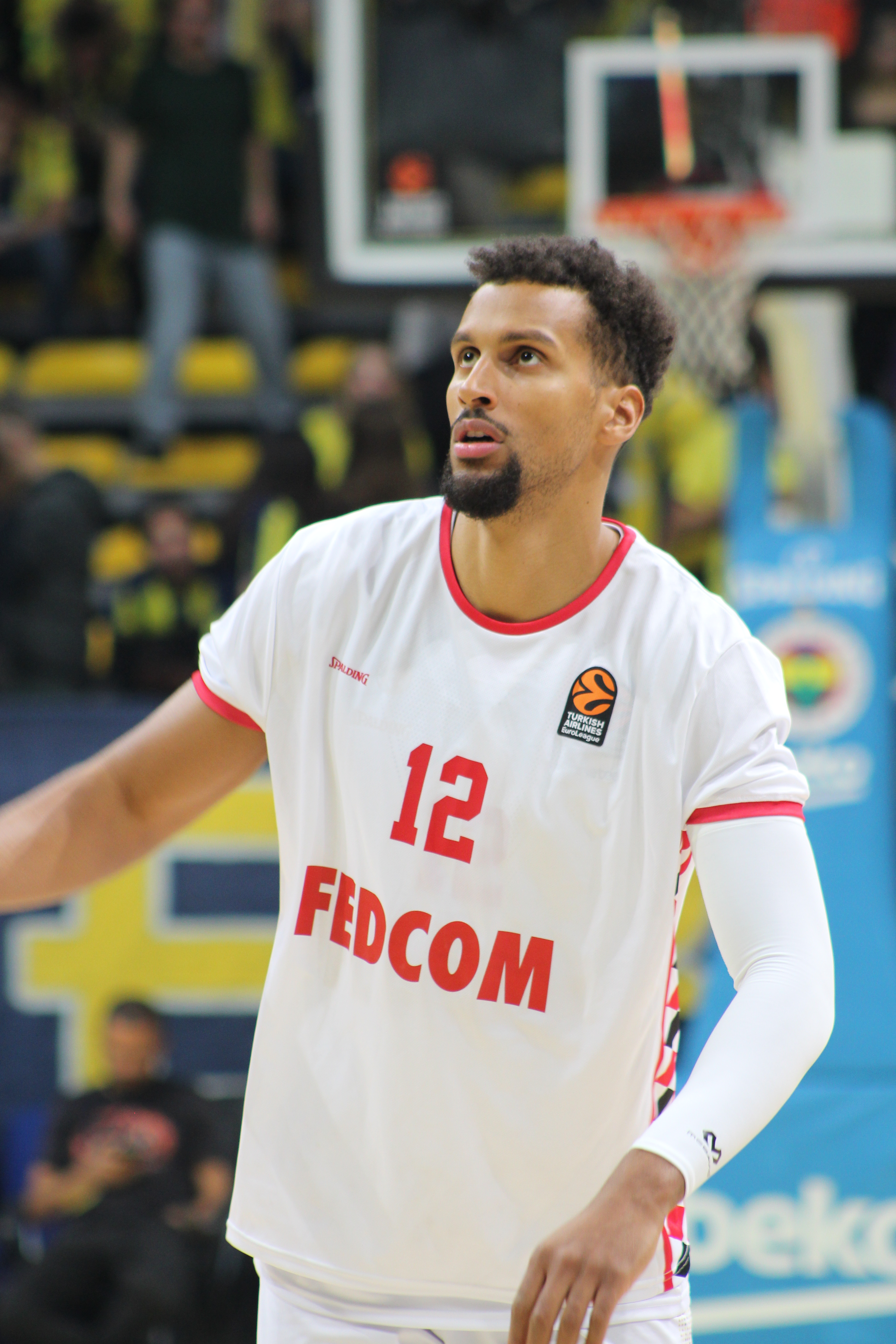
Cornelie with AS Monaco in 2024

On July 19, 2023, Cornelie signed a three-year deal with French champions AS Monaco.

=== Esenler Erokspor (2025–present) ===
On July 27, 2025, he signed with Esenler Erokspor of the Basketbol Süper Ligi (BSL).

== International career ==
Cornelie played for France at the 2012 U17 World Championships in Lithuania, at the 2013 U18 European Championships in Latvia and at the 2015 U20 European Championships in Italy.

== Career statistics ==
Legend
GP	Games played	GS	Games started	MPG	Minutes per game
FG%	Field-goal percentage	3P%	3-point field-goal percentage	FT%	Free-throw percentage
RPG	Rebounds per game	APG	Assists per game	SPG	Steals per game
BPG	Blocks per game	PPG	Points per game	PIR	Performance index rating
**Bold**	Career high

=== NBA ===
==== Regular season ====
Year	Team	GP	GS	MPG	FG%	3P%	FT%	RPG	APG	SPG	BPG	PPG
2021–22	Denver	13	0	2.9	.333	.125	.750	1.1	.2	.1	.1	1.1
Career		13	0	2.9	.333	.125	.750	1.1	.2	.1	.1	1.1

=== EuroLeague ===
†	Denotes seasons in which Cornelie won the EuroLeague

Year	Team	GP	GS	MPG	FG%	3P%	FT%	RPG	APG	SPG	BPG	PPG	PIR
2022–23†	Real Madrid	**33**	**17**	**14.5**	**.511**	**.395**	**.833**	**3.1**	.5	**.3**	.1	**5.8**	**6.7**
2023–24	Monaco	28	3	9.9	.423	.333	.455	1.8	**.7**	**.3**	**.3**	2.7	2.3
Career		61	20	12.4	.481	.375	.714	2.5	.6	.3	.2	4.4	4.7

=== EuroCup ===
Year	Team	GP	GS	MPG	FG%	3P%	FT%	RPG	APG	SPG	BPG	PPG	PIR
2013–14	Le Mans	1	0	2.0	—	—	—	—	—	—	—	0.0	-1.0
2015–16	Le Mans	**10**	**5**	**21.5**	**.339**	**.421**	**.750**	**5.4**	**.4**	**.2**	**.9**	**5.8**	**4.7**
Career		11	5	19.7	.339	.421	.750	4.9	.4	.2	.8	5.3	4.2

=== Basketball Champions League ===
Year	Team	GP	GS	MPG	FG%	3P%	FT%	RPG	APG	SPG	BPG	PPG
2016–17	Le Mans	**16**	6	16.4	.461	.314	**1.000**	**4.9**	.3	**.6**	.4	5.9
2018–19	Le Mans	**16**	3	15.7	**.484**	**.382**	.714	3.2	.4	.3	.3	6.9
2019–20	Élan Béarnais	14	**8**	**21.3**	.475	.333	.688	4.6	**1.0**	.4	**.5**	**7.7**
Career		46	17	17.6	.473	.343	.702	4.2	.6	.4	.4	6.8

=== FIBA EuroChallenge ===
Year	Team	GP	GS	MPG	FG%	3P%	FT%	RPG	APG	SPG	BPG	PPG
2014–15	Le Mans	13	8	14.3	.585	.286	.429	2.9	.5	.4	.5	4.5
Career		13	8	14.3	.585	.286	.429	2.9	.5	.4	.5	4.5

=== Domestic leagues ===
Year	Team	League	GP	MPG	FG%	3P%	FT%	RPG	APG	SPG	BPG	PPG
2013–14	(France) Le Mans	Pro A	1	1.0	—	—	—	—	—	—	—	0.0
2014–15	(France) Le Mans	Pro A	30	16.5	.505	.324	.563	4.4	.5	.3	.8	4.2
2015–16	(France) Le Mans	Pro A	39	19.1	.520	.393	.662	5.1	.3	.3	.4	8.8
2016–17	(France) Le Mans	Pro A	30	13.5	.402	.227	.714	2.9	.6	.2	.4	4.1
2017–18	(France) Metropolitans	Pro A	19	19.2	.468	.400	.773	4.6	.8	.3	.7	5.9
2018–19	(France) Le Mans	LNB Élite	36	16.2	.539	.391	.681	3.6	.3	.3	.6	6.9
2019–20	(France) Élan Béarnais	LNB Élite	25	19.8	.483	.345	.500	5.1	1.2	.1	.4	6.9
2020–21	(France) Élan Béarnais	LNB Élite	34	28.8	.540	.442	.738	7.9	1.5	.7	.3	14.4
2021–22	(United States) Grand Rapids Gold	G League	25	33.2	.497	.362	.688	12.7	2.9	.9	.9	17.8
2022–23	(Spain) Real Madrid	ACB	30	15.2	.393	.262	.806	3.0	.6	.4	.2	4.4
2023–24	(France) Monaco	LNB Élite	43	17.1	.467	.376	.712	4.9	.8	.3	.6	6.5

== Personal life ==
His mother, Pavla Sigmundova, is a former Czech basketball player and his father, Martial Cornelie, played basketball in the Pro B, the second-tier of French basketball. Petr's sister, Jodie Cornelie-Sigmundova, played internationally for the French junior national teams and spent four years on the University of Dayton Flyers women's basketball team.
