= Jure Ritlop =

Slovenian basketball player

Personal information
- Born: 9 June 1995 (age 31) Maribor, Slovenia
- Listed height: 2.05 m (6 ft 9 in)

Career information
- Playing career: 2012–2019
- Position: Power forward

Career history
- 2009–2011: Maribor Messer
- 2011–2017: Krka
- 2011–2014: → Krka mladi
- 2016: → Rogaška

Career highlights
- 2× Slovenian Cup (2015, 2016)

Jure Ritlop (born 9 June 1995) is a Slovenian professional basketball player who last played for KK Krka of the Telemach League.
