= Panthers Schwenningen =

Wiha Panthers Schwenningen
- Leagues: ProA
- Founded: 2006; 20 years ago
- Arena: Deutenberghalle
- Capacity: 1,507
- Location: Villingen-Schwenningen, Germany
- Main sponsor: Wiha Tools
- President: Gabriele Cernoch-Reich
- General manager: Frank Singer
- Head coach: Alen Velčić
- Website: www.blackforest-panthers.com
Home	Uniform

Panthers Schwenningen, for sponsorship reasons Wiha Panthers, is a German basketball club based in Villingen-Schwenningen. The club currently plays in the ProA, the national second tier basketball league. Established in 2006, the club colours are orange and black.

Wiha Tools is main sponsor of the team which is therefore named Wiha Panthers. In the 2018–19 season, Schwenningen was semi-finalist in the third division ProB and was awarded a spot in the ProA.

== Honours ==
- 1. Regionliga

Winners (3): 2009–10, 2016–17, 2017–18
