= Max Ugrai =

German basketball player (born 1995)

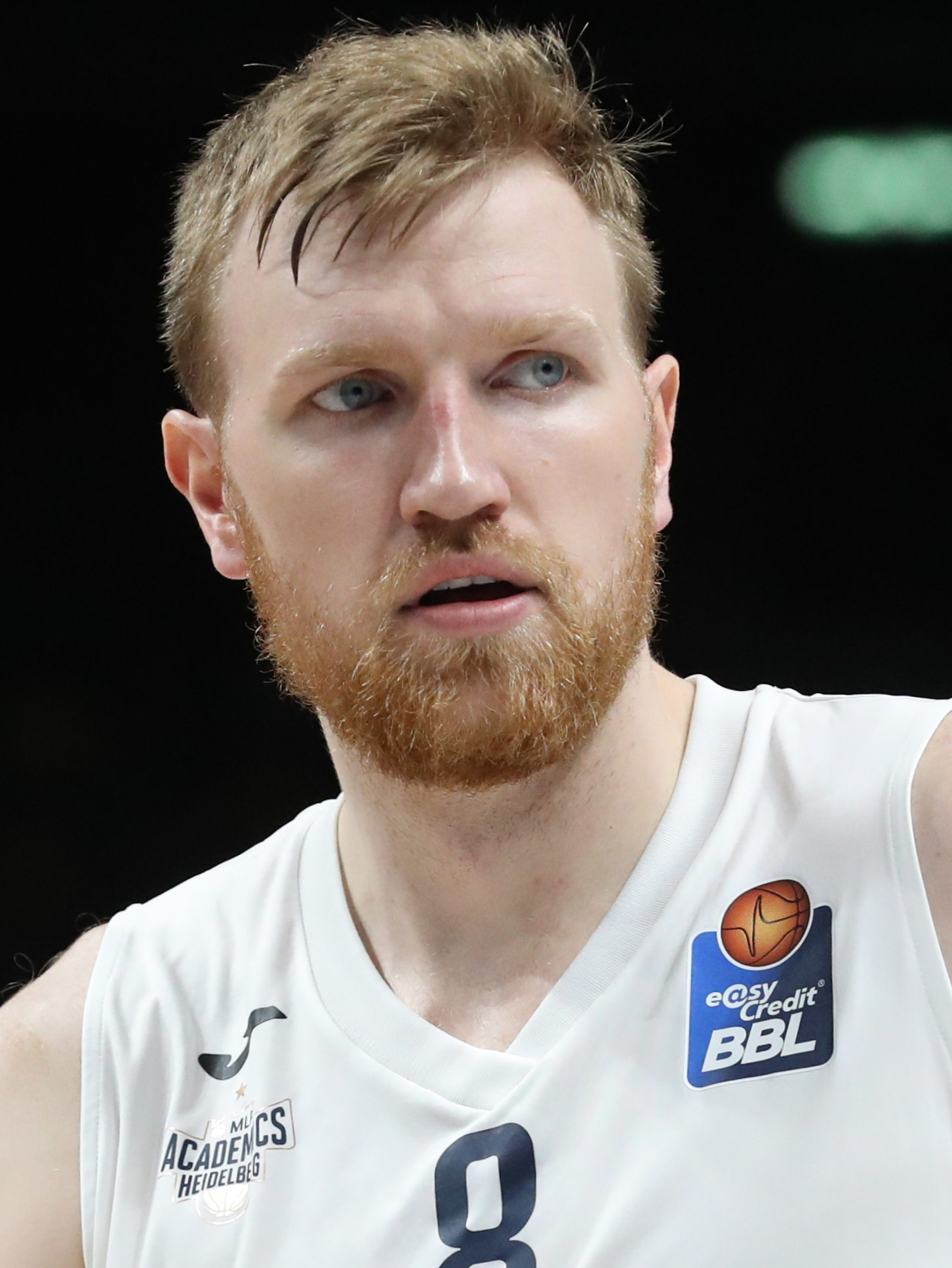
- Max Ugrai in the Basketball Bundesliga for Heidelberg, 2022

No. 6 – Würzburg Baskets
- Position: Small forward
- League: Bundesliga

Personal information
- Born: July 28, 1995 (age 31) Bad Mergentheim, Germany
- Listed height: 6 ft 8.3 in (2.04 m)
- Listed weight: 235.89 lb (107 kg)

Career information
- Playing career: 2012–present

Career history
- 2013–2017: s.Oliver Würzburg
- 2017–2018: Science City Jena
- 2018–2020: Ratiopharm Ulm
- 2020–2021: Eisbären Bremerhaven
- 2021–2023: MLP Academics Heidelberg
- 2023–present: s.Oliver Würzburg
Medals
Men's basketball
Representing Germany

Maximilian Ellis Ugrai (born 28 July 1995) is a German professional basketball player for s.Oliver Würzburg of the Basketball Bundesliga.

== Career ==
Ugrai has already participated as a starter with the German U16 and U18 teams at European Championships. In 2015, Ugrai was nominated for the first time for a training course for the national team.

On June 10, 2017, Ugrai signed with the German team Science City Jena. He averaged 7.4 points a game in 34 Bundesliga contests during the 2017-18 season and moved to fellow Bundesliga team Ratiopharm Ulm in May 2018.

On August 7, 2020, he signed with Eisbären Bremerhaven of the German ProA.

On June 15, 2021, he signed with Academics Heidelberg of the Basketball Bundesliga. With Heidelberg, he was team captain alongside Akeem Vargas.

== Career statistics ==
Legend
GP	Games played	GS	Games started	MPG	Minutes per game
PPG	Points per game	2P%	2-point field-goal percentage	3P%	3-point field-goal percentage
FG%	Field-goal percentage	FT%	Free-throw percentage	RPG	Rebounds per game
APG	Assists per game	SPG	Steals per game	BPG	Blocks per game

=== BBL regular season ===
Saison	Team	GP	GS	MPG	PPG	2P %	3P %	FG %	FT %	RPG	APG	SPG	BPG
2012/13	Würzburg	1	0	20:12	11.0	50.0	66.7	57.1	25.0	4.0	0.0	3.0	0.0
2013/14	Würzburg	14	1	3:45	0.9	33.3	20.0	27.3	83.3	0.7	0.2	0.0	0.0
2015/16	Würzburg	22	6	10:16	3.4	50.0	43.8	48.0	82.6	1.7	0.9	0.1	0.3
2016/17	Würzburg	30	19	17:53	4.3	51.6	30.0	43.1	70.0	2.5	0.9	0.5	0.6
2017/18	Jena	34	27	19:42	7.4	57.7	37.6	47.9	76.6	3.0	0.7	0.6	0.5
2018/19	Ulm												

=== BBL playoffs ===
Saison	Team	GP	GS	MPG	PPG	2P %	3P %	FG %	FT %	RPG	APG	SPG	BPG
2015/16	Würzburg	3	3	13:51	3.3	30.0	50.0	33.3	50.0	1.7	0.0	0.3	0.3
