= List of indoor arenas in Greece =

The following is a list of indoor arenas in Greece, ordered by seating capacity. Indoor stadiums with a capacity of 1,000 or higher are included.

== Current arenas ==
Image	Stadium	Capacity	City	Team	Inaugurated
	Telekom Center Athens	19,443	Athens	Panathinaikos	1995
	Peace and Friendship Stadium	12,940	Piraeus	Olympiacos	1985
	SUNEL Arena	9,025	Athens	AEK	2004
	PAOK Sports Arena	8,142	Thessaloniki	PAOK	2000
	Galatsi Olympic Hall	6,200	Athens		2004
	Alexandreio Melathron	6,104	Thessaloniki	Aris	1966
	Heraklion Indoor Sports Arena	5,500	Heraklion	Irakleio	2007
	Larissa Neapolis Arena	5,500	Larissa	Gymnastikos Larissas / Larisa	1995
	Chalkiopoulio Sports Hall	5,000	Lamia	Esperos Lamias	1995
	Lefkovrisi Indoor Hall	5,000	Kozani		2014
	Dimitris Tofalos Arena	4,200	Patras	Promitheas Patras	1995
	Peristeri Indoor Hall Andreas Papandreou	4,000	Athens	Peristeri	1989
	Philippos Amiridis Indoor Hall	3,957	Xanthi	Aspida Xanthi	2000
	Faliro Sports Pavilion Arena	3,836	Palaio Faliro		2004
	Ioannis Bourousis Karditsa New Indoor Hall	3,500	Karditsa	Kardista	2019
	Apollon Patras Indoor Hall	3,500	Patras	Apollon Patras	1992
	Glyfada Makis Liougas Sportshall	3,500	Athens		1970
	Kallithea Palais des Sports	3,400	Rhodes	Kolossos Rodou	2014
	Chania Kladissos Indoor Hall	3,000	Chania		2005
	Sportshall of Ano Liosia	3,000	Athens		1998
	Korydallos Sports Hall	3,000	Piraeus		1994
	Ivanofeio Sports Arena	2,500	Thessaloniki	Iraklis Thessaloniki	1987
	Nikos Samaras Indoor Hall	2,500	Orestiada		2004
	Trikala Indoor Hall	2,500	Trikala	Aiolos Trikala	1985
	Sporting Sports Arena	2,500	Athens	Sporting	1968
	TEI Indoor Sports Hall	2,400	Heraklion		2004
	Peristeri Olympic Hall	2,305	Athens		2004
	Amaliada Indoor Hall	2,000	Amaliada	Koroivos	1987
	Evosmos Sports Hall	2,000	Thessaloniki		1985
	Aigaleo Stavros Venetis Indoor Hall	2,000	Aigaleo	Aigaleo	1973
	Nea Ionia Municipal Indoor Athletic Center	1,964	Volos		
	Melina Merkouri Rentis Indoor Hall	1,800	Piraeus		2005
	Panellinios Indoor Hall	1,800	Athens	Panellinios	1976
	Dimitris Krachtidis Indoor Hall	1,700	Drama	KAOD	1997
	Maroussi Saint Thomas Indoor Hall	1,700	Athens	Maroussi	1998
	Kalamitsa Indoor Hall	1,650	Kavala	Kavala	
	Tasos Kampouris Kanithou Indoor Hall	1,620	Chalkida		1996
	Melina Merkouri Indoor Hall	1,600	Rethymno	Rethymno	1992
	Pavlos and Thanasis Giannakopoulos Indoor Hall	1,500	Athens	Panathinaikos women's basketball	1959
	E.A. Patras Indoor Hall	1,500	Patras	E.A. Patras	
	Kilkis Indoor Arena	1,400	Kilkis		2015
	Lido Indoor Hall	1,400	Heraklion	Ergotelis	1985
	Mikra Indoor Arena 3	1,380	Thessaloniki		2008
	Kroisos Persis Indoor Hall	1,300	Athens	Milon	1968
	Myrina Indoor Arena Nikos Samaras	1,260	Myrina		
	Venetokleio Indoor Hall	1,242	Rhodes		1997
	Sofia Befon Indoor Hall	1,204	Piraeus	Palaio Faliro	2017
	Mikra Indoor Arena 1	1,200	Thessaloniki		1990
	Michalis Mouroutsos Indoor Hall	1,200	Athens	Dafni	1992
	Markos Foniadakis Indoor Hall	1,100	Ierapetra		
	Heraklion University Sports Hall	1,080	Heraklion		2004

== See also ==
- Basketball in Greece
- List of indoor arenas in Europe
- Lists of stadiums
