= 2014 FIBA Europe Under-20 Championship =

17th edition of the FIBA Europe Under-20 Championship

2014 EuroBasket Under-20
17th FIBA Europe Under-20 Championship

Tournament details
- Host country: Greece
- Dates: 8 – 20 July 2014
- Teams: 20
- Venue(s): 3 (in 2 host cities)

Final positions
- Champions: Turkey (1st title)

Tournament statistics
- MVP: (Turkey) Cedi Osman
- Top scorer: (Bulgaria) Vezenkov (19.3)
- Top rebounds: (Bulgaria) Vezenkov (11.2)
- Top assists: (Slovenia) Rebec (9.0)

Official website
- Official website (archive)

The 2014 FIBA Europe Under-20 Championship was the 17th edition of the FIBA Europe Under-20 Championship. The competition was played in Crete, Greece, from 8 to 20 July 2014. The winners were Turkey. To win the title they beat Spain with a score of 65–57. It was their first ever title win. The runners-up were Spain and third place were Serbia. Defending champions from 2013, Italy, came in at tenth place, their worst result since 2010.

== Participating teams ==
- Bulgaria
- Croatia
- Czech Republic
- France
- Germany
- Great Britain ▲ (Runners-up, 2013 FIBA Europe U20 DivB (Romania))
- Greece
- Hungary ▲ (3rd place, 2013 FIBA Europe U20 DivB (Romania))
- Israel
- Italy
- Latvia
- Lithuania
- Montenegro
- Poland ▲ (Winners, 2013 FIBA Europe U20 DivB (Romania))
- Russia
- Serbia
- Slovenia
- Spain
- Sweden
- Turkey

== Venues ==
2014 FIBA Europe Under-20 Championship is located in Greece	Heraklion		Rethymno
2014 FIBA Europe Under-20 Championship is located in Greece	Heraklion Arena	Heraklion University Hall	Melina Merkouri Hall
2014 FIBA Europe Under-20 Championship is located in Greece	Capacity: 5,222	Capacity: 1,080	Capacity: 1,600

== First round ==
The first-round groups draw took place on 1 December 2013 in Freising, Germany. In this round, the twenty teams were allocated in four groups of five teams each. The top three teams advanced to the Second Round. The last two teams of each group played in the Classification Games.

=== Group A ===
Pos	Team	Pld	W	L	PF	PA	PD	Pts	Qualification
1	Lithuania	4	4	0	304	243	+61	8	Advance to second round
2	Great Britain	4	2	2	250	262	−12	6 (Note: Great Britain-Greece 69–66)	Advance to second round
3	Greece	4	2	2	277	284	−7	6	Advance to second round
4	Latvia	4	1	3	266	284	−18	5 (Note: Latvia-Hungary 84–67)	Classification Group G
5	Hungary	4	1	3	247	271	−24	5	Classification Group H

Source: u20men.fibaeurope.com

=== Group B ===
Pos	Team	Pld	W	L	PF	PA	PD	Pts	Qualification
1	Serbia	4	4	0	294	239	+55	8	Advance to second round
2	Slovenia	4	2	2	262	257	+5	6 (Note: Slovenia 3pts/131:126 (+5) :: Spain-Slovenia 63–71, Germany-Slovenia 63–60)	Advance to second round
3	Spain	4	2	2	257	253	+4	6 (Note: Spain 3pts/128:124 (+4) :: Germany-Spain 53–65, Spain-Slovenia 63–71)	Advance to second round
4	Germany	4	2	2	266	248	+18	6 (Note: Germany 3pts/116:125 (-9) :: Germany-Spain 53–65, Germany-Slovenia 63–60)	Classification Group H
5	Sweden	4	0	4	213	295	−82	4	Classification Group G

Source: u20men.fibaeurope.com

=== Group C ===
Pos	Team	Pld	W	L	PF	PA	PD	Pts	Qualification
1	Turkey	4	4	0	327	279	+48	8	Advance to second round
2	Croatia	4	3	1	290	245	+45	7	Advance to second round
3	Italy	4	2	2	305	314	−9	6	Advance to second round
4	Montenegro	4	1	3	313	316	−3	5	Classification Group G
5	Czech Republic	4	0	4	240	321	−81	4	Classification Group H

Source: u20men.fibaeurope.com

=== Group D ===
Pos	Team	Pld	W	L	PF	PA	PD	Pts	Qualification
1	France	4	3	1	284	265	+19	7 (Note: France-Israel 75–63)	Advance to second round
2	Israel	4	3	1	277	248	+29	7	Advance to second round
3	Poland	4	2	2	269	290	−21	6 (Note: Russia-Poland 71–75)	Advance to second round
4	Russia	4	2	2	270	262	+8	6	Classification Group H
5	Bulgaria	4	0	4	286	321	−35	4	Classification Group G

Source: u20men.fibaeurope.com

== Second round ==
=== Group E ===
Pos	Team	Pld	W	L	PF	PA	PD	Pts	Qualification
1	Serbia	5	4	1	359	303	+56	9	Advance to Quarterfinals
2	Spain	5	3	2	325	320	+5	8 (Note: Spain 4pts/125:120 (+5) :: Spain-Lithuania 65–62, Spain-Greece 60–58)	Advance to Quarterfinals
3	Lithuania	5	3	2	333	338	−5	8 (Note: Lithuania 3pts/135:130 (+5) :: Greece-Lithuania 65–73, Spain-Lithuania 65–62)	Advance to Quarterfinals
4	Greece	5	3	2	343	338	+5	8 (Note: Greece 2pts/123:133 (-10) :: Greece-Lithuania 65–73, Spain-Greece 60–58)	Advance to Quarterfinals
5	Slovenia	5	2	3	336	335	+1	7	9th – 12th place playoffs
6	Great Britain	5	1	4	310	372	−62	6	9th – 12th place playoffs

Source: u20men.fibaeurope.com

=== Group F ===
Pos	Team	Pld	W	L	PF	PA	PD	Pts	Qualification
1	Croatia	5	4	1	364	324	+40	9 (Note: Croatia 3pts/129:125 (+4) :: Turkey-Croatia 70–66, Croatia-France 63–55)	Advance to Quarterfinals
2	Turkey	5	4	1	362	317	+45	9 (Note: Turkey 3pts/134:134 (0) :: Turkey-Croatia 70–66, France-Turkey 68–64)	Advance to Quarterfinals
3	France	5	4	1	331	315	+16	9 (Note: France 3pts/123:127 (-4) :: Croatia-France 63–55, France-Turkey 68–64)	Advance to Quarterfinals
4	Israel	5	2	3	358	350	+8	7	Advance to Quarterfinals
5	Italy	5	1	4	326	367	−41	6	9th – 12th place playoffs
6	Poland	5	0	5	268	336	−68	5	9th – 12th place playoffs

Source: u20men.fibaeurope.com

== Classification groups for 13th – 20th places ==
=== Group G ===
Team	Pld	W	L	PF	PA	PD	Pts
Latvia	3	2	1	203	187	+16	5
Bulgaria	3	2	1	223	207	+16	5
Sweden	3	1	2	186	200	−14	4
Montenegro	3	1	2	188	206	−18	4

=== Group H ===
Team	Pld	W	L	PF	PA	PD	Pts
Russia	3	2	1	204	174	+30	5
Germany	3	2	1	199	165	+34	5
Hungary	3	2	1	185	185	0	5
Czech Republic	3	0	3	163	227	−64	3

== Classification playoffs for 9th – 20th place ==
=== Classification games for 17th – 20th place ===
18 July 2014
12:30

Report

Sweden	58–81	Czech Republic
Scoring by quarter: 27–18, 14–23, 9–23, 8–17

Heraklion Indoor Sports Arena, Heraklion (GRE)
Referees: Doru Vinasi (ROU), Moritz Reiter (GER), Boris Gabara (SVK)

18 July 2014
12:30

Report

Hungary	59–70	Montenegro
Scoring by quarter: 14–23, 18–12, 13–16, 14–19

Heraklion University Sports Hall, Heraklion (GRE)
Referees: Fernando Rocha (POR), Sergiy Zashchuk (UKR), Doru Vinasi (ROU)

=== Classification games for 13th – 16th place ===
18 July 2014
14:45

Report

Latvia	62–67	Germany
Scoring by quarter: 17–15, 14–15, 8–17, 23–20
Pts: Rolands Šmits 14; Rebs: Ilja Gromovs 12; Asts: 3 players tied with 3		Pts: Ismet Akpinar 15; Rebs: Johannes Thiemann 12; Asts: Malik Müller 3, Ismet Akpinar 3

Heraklion University Sports Hall, Heraklion (GRE)
Referees: Igor Dragojević (MNE), Nicolas Maestre (FRA), Torkild Rodsand (NOR)

18 July 2014
17:00

Report

Russia	67–63	Bulgaria
Scoring by quarter: 14–13, 20–21, 15–17, 18–12
Pts: Stanislav Ilnitskiy 17; Rebs: Stanislav Ilnitskiy 9 Asts: Serdar Annaev 6		Pts: Nikolay Stoyanov 17; Rebs: Sasha Vezenkov 11; Asts: Nikolay Marinov 4

Heraklion University Sports Hall, Heraklion (GRE)
Referees: Paolo Taurino (ITA), Boris Gabara (SVK), Omar Bermudez Mariscal (MEX)

=== Classification games for 9th – 12th place ===
18 July 2014
19:15

Slovenia	60–79	Poland

Heraklion University Sports Hall, Heraklion (GRE)

18 July 2014
21:30

Italy	76–67	Great Britain

Heraklion University Sports Hall, Heraklion (GRE)

== Championship playoffs ==
Fifth place
E3	Lithuania	77
E4	Greece	73
Seventh place
F4	Israel	68
F3	France	55

Consolation semifinals
F4	Israel	75
E3	Lithuania	81
E4	Greece	81
F3	France	72

Quarterfinals
E1	Serbia	90
F4	Israel	86
F2	Turkey	79
E3	Lithuania	65
F1	Croatia	82
E4	Greece	68
E2	Spain	50
F3	France	46

Semifinals
E1	Serbia	53
F2	Turkey	66
F1	Croatia	61
E2	Spain	63

Final
F2	Turkey	65
E2	Spain	57
Third place
E1	Serbia	79
F1	Croatia	66

=== Quarterfinals ===
18 July 2014
14:45

Turkey	79–65	Lithuania

18 July 2014
17:00

Serbia	90–86	Israel

18 July 2014
19:15

Spain	50–46	France

18 July 2014
21:30

Croatia	82–68	Greece

=== 5th – 8th place playoffs ===
19 July 2014
14:45

Israel	75–81	Lithuania

19 July 2014
17:00

Greece	81–72	France

=== Semifinals ===
19 July 2014
19:15

Report

Serbia	53–66	Turkey

19 July 2014
21:30

Report

Croatia	61–63	Spain

== Final classification games ==
=== Match for 19th place ===
19 July 2014
14:45

Report

Sweden	58–54	Hungary
Scoring by quarter: 8–16, 12–13, 15–11, 23–14

=== Match for 17th place ===
20 July 2014
17:00

Report

Czech Republic	83–55	Montenegro
Scoring by quarter: 20–11, 17–16, 22–13, 24–15

=== Match for 15th place ===
19 July 2014
19:15

Report

Latvia	72–74	Bulgaria
Scoring by quarter: 12–14, 24–14, 16–22, 20–24

=== Match for 13th place ===
19 July 2014
17:00

Report

Germany	47–52	Russia
Scoring by quarter: 11–21, 12–12, 11–11, 13–8

=== Match for 11th place ===
20 July 2014
12:30

Report

Slovenia	82–85	Great Britain
Scoring by quarter: 18–32, 20–18, 18–15, 26–20

=== Match for 9th place ===
20 July 2014
14:45

Report

Poland	79–75	Italy
Scoring by quarter: 23–17, 21–18, 15–20, 20–20

=== Match for 7th place ===
20 July 2014
14:45

Report

Israel	68–55	France
Scoring by quarter: 13–12, 17–15, 23–13, 15–15

=== Match for 5th place ===
20 July 2014
17:00

Report

Lithuania	77–73	Greece
Scoring by quarter: 28–18, 18–14, 15–24, 16–17

=== Bronze medal match ===
20 July 2014
19:15

Report

Serbia	79–66	Croatia
Scoring by quarter: 17–18, 22–18, 22–12, 18–18

=== Final ===
20 July 2014
21:30

Report

Turkey	65–57	Spain
Scoring by quarter: 14–18, 21–10, 13–18, 17–11
Pts: Osman (20); Rebs: Özmızrak (8); Asts: Birsen (4)		Pts: Paulí (17); Rebs: Hernangómez (8), Saiz (8); Asts: Díaz (5)

Heraklion Indoor Sports Arena, Heraklion (GRE)
Attendance: 3 500
Referees: Ilija Belošević (SRB), Fernando Rocha (POR), Doru Vinasi (ROU)

== Final standings ==
Rank	Team	Record
1st place, gold medalist(s)	Turkey	9–1
2nd place, silver medalist(s)	Spain	7–3
3rd place, bronze medalist(s)	Serbia	8–2
4th	Croatia	7–3
5th	Lithuania	7–3
6th	Greece	6–4
7th	Israel	5–5
8th	France	5–5
9th	Poland	4–5
10th	Italy	4–5
11th	Great Britain	3–6
12th	Slovenia	3–6
13th	Russia	6–3
14th	Germany	5–4
15th	Bulgaria	3–6
16th	Latvia	3–6
17th	Czech Republic	2–7
18th	Montenegro	3–6
19th	Sweden	2–7
20th	Hungary	3–6

2014 FIBA Europe Under-20 Championship
Winners

Turkey
First title

Team relegated to 2015 Euro U-20 Division B

== Awards ==
Most Valuable Player
(Turkey) Cedi Osman

=== All-Tournament Team ===
- (Turkey) Cedi Osman
- (Serbia) Nikola Janković
- (Spain) Willy Hernangómez
- (Bulgaria) Sasha Vezenkov
- (Slovenia) Matic Rebec
