= 2017 FIBA U20 European Championship =

20th edition of the FIBA U20 European Championship

Tournament details
- Host country: Greece
- Dates: 15–23 July
- Teams: 16
- Venue(s): 4 (in 3 host cities)

Final positions
- Champions: Greece (3rd title)
- Runners-up: Israel
- Third place: France
- Fourth place: Spain

Tournament statistics
- Games played: 56
- MVP: (Greece) Vassilis Charalampopoulos
- Top scorer: (Ukraine) Sviatoslav Mykhailiuk (20.4 points per game)

Official website
- www.fiba.basketball

The 2017 FIBA U20 European Championship was the 20th edition of the FIBA U20 European Championship. The competition took place in three Greek cities, Chania, Rethymno and Heraklion, on the island of Crete, from 15 to 23 July 2017.

== Venues ==
2017 FIBA U20 European Championship is located in Greece	Heraklion		Chania	Rethymno
2017 FIBA U20 European Championship is located in Greece	Heraklion Arena	Heraklion University Hall	Kladissos Hall	Melina Merkouri Hall
2017 FIBA U20 European Championship is located in Greece	Capacity: 5,222	Capacity: 1,080	Capacity: 2,400	Capacity: 1,600

== Participating teams ==
- Czech Republic
- France
- Germany
- Greece ▲ (3rd place, 2016 FIBA U20 European Championship Division B)
- Israel
- Italy
- Iceland ▲ (Runners-up, 2016 FIBA U20 European Championship Division B)
- Latvia
- Lithuania
- Montenegro ▲ (Winners, 2016 FIBA U20 European Championship Division B)
- Serbia
- Slovenia
- Spain
- Sweden
- Turkey
- Ukraine

== First round ==
In this round, the 16 teams are allocated in four groups of four teams each. All teams will advance to the Second Round of 16.

=== Group A ===
Pos	Team	Pld	W	L	PF	PA	PD	Pts
1	Greece	3	3	0	253	168	+85	6
2	Sweden	3	2	1	186	201	−15	5
3	Germany	3	1	2	233	209	+24	4
4	Czech Republic	3	0	3	154	248	−94	3

Source: FIBA
Rules for classification: 1) Points; 2) Head-to-head results; 3) Points difference; 4) Points scored.

15 July 2017
13:45

Boxscore

Sweden	72–66	Germany
Scoring by quarter: 17–13, 14–17, 18–18, 23–18
Pts: S. Birgander 19; Rebs: S. Birgander 16; Asts: H. Sjolin 3		Pts: L. Kratzer 14; Rebs: M. Wagner 8 Asts: G. Beyschlag 5

Kladisos Hall, Chania
Attendance: 200
Referees:
(Italy) Tolga Sahin
(Cyprus) Ilias Kounelles
(Slovenia) Boris Krejić

15 July 2017
21:15

Boxscore

Czech Republic	47–88	Greece
Scoring by quarter: 18–28, 14–26, 6–17, 9–17
Pts: T. Dlugos 11; Rebs: O. Sehnal 5 Asts: J. Tuma 3		Pts: D. Skoulidas 12; Rebs: I. Agravanis 7 Asts: A. Koniaris 8

Kladisos Hall, Chania
Attendance: 300
Referees:
(Spain) Vicente Bultó
(Lithuania) Artūras Šukys
(Estonia) Tanel Suslov

16 July 2017
19:00

Boxscore

Germany	90–51	Czech Republic
Scoring by quarter: 18–5, 25–28, 29–9, 18–9
Pts: L. Kratzer 15; Rebs: L. Kratzer 6 Asts: H. Hujic 4		Pts: F. Vana 15; Rebs: F. Vana 3 Asts: O. Sehnal 6

Kladisos Hall, Chania
Attendance: 200
Referees:
(Serbia) Saša Maričić
(Bosnia and Herzegovina) Haris Bijedić
(Iceland) Sigmundur Herbertsson

16 July 2017
21:15

Boxscore

Greece	79–44	Sweden
Scoring by quarter: 16–9, 18–14, 24–13, 21–8
Pts: V. Christidis 15; Rebs: A. Koniaris 4 Asts: V. Charalampopoulos 4		Pts: S. Birgander 13; Rebs: S. Birgander 12; Asts: J. Brandmark 2

Kladisos Hall, Chania
Attendance: 500
Referees:
(Bosnia and Herzegovina) Petar Obradović
(Russia) Sergei Beliakov
(Montenegro) Zdravko Rutešić

17 July 2017
16:45

Boxscore

Czech Republic	56–70	Sweden
Scoring by quarter: 19–21, 17–13, 12–18, 8–18
Pts: M. Roub 13; Rebs: M. Roub 5 Asts: O. Sehnal 4		Pts: S. Birgander 22; Rebs: S. Birgander 15; Asts: S. Berkelund 3

Kladisos Hall, Chania
Attendance: 50
Referees:
(Ukraine) Borys Shulga
(Cyprus) Ilias Kounelles
(Montenegro) Zdravko Rutešić

17 July 2017
21:15

Boxscore

Germany	77–86	Greece
Scoring by quarter: 25–18, 13–19, 17–13, 22–36
Pts: G. Beyschlag 16; Rebs: L. Kratzer 9 Asts: G. Beyschlag 10		Pts: V. Charalampopoulos 18; Rebs: T. Karras 6 Asts: V. Charalampopoulos 6

Kladisos Hall, Chania
Attendance: 600
Referees:
(Italy) Tolga Sahin
(Israel) Omer Esteron
(Estonia) Tanel Suslov

=== Group B ===
Pos	Team	Pld	W	L	PF	PA	PD	Pts
1	France	3	3	0	205	177	+28	6
2	Turkey	3	1	2	205	210	−5	4
3	Iceland	3	1	2	176	190	−14	4
4	Montenegro	3	1	2	196	205	−9	4

Source: FIBA
Rules for classification: 1) Points; 2) Head-to-head results; 3) Points difference; 4) Points scored.

15 July 2017
16:00

Boxscore

Iceland	50–58	France
Scoring by quarter: 9–14, 8–8, 19–16, 14–20
Pts: T. Hlinason 16; Rebs: T. Hlinason 15; Asts: K. Jónsson 4		Pts: A. Noua 12; Rebs: D. Poirier 11; Asts: L. Hergot 4

Kladisos Hall, Chania
Attendance: 300
Referees:
(Serbia) Sasa Maričić
(Russia) Sergei Beliakov
(Israel) Omer Esteron

15 July 2017
18:15

Boxscore

Montenegro	73–69 (OT)	Turkey
Scoring by quarter: 11–16, 18–11, 19–19, 13–15, Overtime: 12–8
Pts: M. Popović 19; Rebs: M. Popović 15; Asts: F. Bakić 3		Pts: B. Durmaz 20; Rebs: Ö. Yurtseven 18; Asts: E. Taskiran 3

Kladisos Hall, Chania
Attendance: 150
Referees:
(Ukraine) Borys Shulga
(Italy) Alessandro Martolini
(Russia) Ilya Putenko

16 July 2017
14:30

Boxscore

France	76–73 (OT)	Montenegro
Scoring by quarter: 15–10, 17–15, 18–18, 13–20, Overtime: 13–10
Pts: E. Okobo 16; Rebs: A. Noua 10; Asts: R. Ona Embo 4		Pts: M. Starovlah 25; Rebs: M. Popović 15; Asts: F. Bakić 5

Kladisos Hall, Chania
Attendance: 100
Referees:
(Bosnia and Herzegovina) Ademir Zurapović
(Cyprus) Ilias Kounelles
(Belarus) Andrei Sharapa

16 July 2017
16:45

Boxscore

Turkey	82–66	Iceland
Scoring by quarter: 13–14, 26–15, 20–14, 23–23
Pts: E. Arna 27; Rebs: E. Arna 12; Asts: C. Havsa 10		Pts: T. Hlinason 12; Rebs: T. Hlinason 10; Asts: Þ. Þorbjarnarson 3

Kladisos Hall, Chania
Attendance: 150
Referees:
(Latvia) Andris Aunkrogers
(Czech Republic) Petr Hrůša
(Croatia) Tomislav Vovk

17 July 2017
14:30

Boxscore

Montenegro	50–60	Iceland
Scoring by quarter: 21–7, 6–22, 17–16, 6–15
Pts: M. Popovic 15; Rebs: M. Popovic 13; Asts: J. Vojinovic 4		Pts: T. Hlinason 19; Rebs: T. Hlinason 13; Asts: H. Hermannsson 6

Kladisos Hall, Chania
Attendance: 100
Referees:
(Greece) Anastasios Piloidis
(Sweden) Rickard Eriksson
(Italy) Alessandro Martolini

17 July 2017
19:00

Boxscore

France	71–54	Turkey
Scoring by quarter: 20–10, 22–11, 13–24, 16–9
Pts: E. Diawara 14; Rebs: E. Diawara 13; Asts: E. Okobo 8		Pts: E. Arna 16; Rebs: Ö. Yurtseven 11; Asts: O. Al 6

Kladisos Hall, Chania
Attendance: 150
Referees:
(Spain) Vicente Bultó
(Slovenia) Boris Krejic
(Russia) Ilya Putenko

=== Group C ===
Pos	Team	Pld	W	L	PF	PA	PD	Pts
1	Israel	3	3	0	275	225	+50	6
2	Lithuania	3	2	1	269	234	+35	5
3	Ukraine	3	1	2	237	245	−8	4
4	Latvia	3	0	3	177	254	−77	3

Source: FIBA
Rules for classification: 1) Points; 2) Head-to-head results; 3) Points difference; 4) Points scored.

15 July 2017
14:30

Boxscore

Ukraine	79–92	Lithuania
Scoring by quarter: 20–36, 20–21, 18–11, 21–24
Pts: S. Mykhailiuk 25; Rebs: D. Skapintsev 9 Asts: V. Zotov 5		Pts: L. Birutis 27; Rebs: M. Echodas 12; Asts: L. Beliauskas 8

Melina Merkouri Hall, Rethymno
Attendance: 100
Referees:
(Bosnia and Herzegovina) Ademir Zurapović
(Iceland) Sigmundur Herbertsson
(Montenegro) Zdravko Rutešić

15 July 2017
19:00

Boxscore

Israel	90–54	Latvia
Scoring by quarter: 23–16, 22–16, 30–9, 15–13
Pts: Y. Zoosman 23; Rebs: N. Artzi 6 Asts: T. Blatt 10		Pts: R. Blumbergs 11; Rebs: R. Birkans 6 Asts: R. Birkans 5

Melina Merkouri Hall, Rethymno
Attendance: 110
Referees:
(Bosnia and Herzegovina) Petar Obradović
(Sweden) Rickard Eriksson
(Croatia) Tomislav Vovk

16 July 2017
14:30

Boxscore

Latvia	62–75	Ukraine
Scoring by quarter: 21–31, 17–16, 15–9, 9–19
Pts: R. Birkans 15; Rebs: R. Blumbergs 9 Asts: R. Birkans 8		Pts: S. Mykhailiuk 26; Rebs: I. Tkachenko 10; Asts: I. Tyrtyshnyk 5

Melina Merkouri Hall, Rethymno
Attendance: 120
Referees:
(Italy) Tolga Şahin
(Italy) Alessandro Martolini
(Turkey) Zafer Yılmaz

16 July 2017
21:15

Boxscore

Lithuania	88–94	Israel
Scoring by quarter: 22–34, 22–22, 18–19, 26–19
Pts: M. Varnas 22; Rebs: M. Varnas 8 Asts: L. Beliauskas 10		Pts: T. Blatt 27; Rebs: T. Blatt 8 Asts: T. Blatt 13

Melina Merkouri Hall, Rethymno
Attendance: 300
Referees:
(Spain) Vicente Bultó
(Slovenia) Boris Krejić
(Russia) Ilya Putenko

17 July 2017
16:45

Boxscore

Ukraine	83–91	Israel
Scoring by quarter: 17–16, 16–24, 20–24, 30–27
Pts: S. Pavlov 13; Rebs: S. Pavlov 10; Asts: S. Mykhailiuk 4		Pts: T. Blatt 23; Rebs: N. Artzi 7 Asts: T. Blatt 5

Melina Merkouri Hall, Rethymno
Attendance: 110
Referees:
(Serbia) Sasa Maricic
(Bosnia and Herzegovina) Haris Bijedic
(Czech Republic) Petr Hrusa

17 July 2017
19:00

Boxscore

Latvia	61–89	Lithuania
Scoring by quarter: 26–18, 12–25, 14–25, 9–21
Pts: V. Kohs 17; Rebs: K. Viksne 6 Asts: N. Zotovs 4		Pts: M. Echodas 17; Rebs: L. Birutis 11; Asts: L. Beliauskas 5

Melina Merkouri Hall, Rethymno
Attendance: 150
Referees:
(Bosnia and Herzegovina) Ademir Zurapović
(Iceland) Sigmundur Herbertsson
(Croatia) Tomislav Vovk

=== Group D ===
Pos	Team	Pld	W	L	PF	PA	PD	Pts
1	Spain	3	3	0	262	218	+44	6
2	Serbia	3	2	1	246	214	+32	5
3	Slovenia	3	1	2	198	236	−38	4
4	Italy	3	0	3	204	242	−38	3

Source: FIBA
Rules for classification: 1) Points; 2) Head-to-head results; 3) Points difference; 4) Points scored.

15 July 2017
16:45

Boxscore

Slovenia	59–91	Spain
Scoring by quarter: 15–30, 15–17, 14–25, 15–19
Pts: Ž. Šiško 15; Rebs: M. Vešl 5 Asts: N. Martincić 2		Pts: S. Yusta 17; Rebs: S. García 5 Asts: S. García 7

Melina Merkouri Hall, Rethymno
Attendance: 150
Referees:
(Latvia) Andris Aunkrogers
(Bosnia and Herzegovina) Haris Bijedić
(Czech Republic) Petr Hrůša

15 July 2017
21:15

Boxscore

Italy	69–77	Serbia
Scoring by quarter: 12–19, 19–26, 21–21, 17–11
Pts: D. Okeke 20; Rebs: D. Okeke 7 Asts: L. Caroti 4		Pts: V. Marinković 30; Rebs: B. Simanić 13; Asts: A. Stepanović 3

Melina Merkouri Hall, Rethymno
Attendance: 300
Referees:
(Greece) Anastasios Piloidis
(Belarus) Andrei Sharapa
(Turkey) Zafer Yılmaz

16 July 2017
16:45

Boxscore

Serbia	82–57	Slovenia
Scoring by quarter: 25–13, 10–13, 15–15, 32–16
Pts: V. Marinković 18; Rebs: S. Peno 6 Asts: S. Peno 5		Pts: U. Durnik 10; Rebs: M. Vešl 5 Asts: Ž. Šiško 4

Melina Merkouri Hall, Rethymno
Attendance: 120
Referees:
(Greece) Anastasios Piloidis
(Sweden) Rickard Eriksson
(Lithuania) Arturas Sukys

16 July 2017
19:00

Boxscore

Spain	83–72	Italy
Scoring by quarter: 27–26, 18–15, 17–15, 21–16
Pts: M. Martí 20; Rebs: S. Yusta 6 Asts: S. García 7		Pts: D. Okeke 16; Rebs: D. Okeke 13; Asts: L. Caroti 8

Melina Merkouri Hall, Rethymno
Attendance: 250
Referees:
(Ukraine) Borys Shulga
(Israel) Omer Esteron
(Estonia) Tanel Suslov

17 July 2017
14:30

Boxscore

Italy	63–82	Slovenia
Scoring by quarter: 13–17, 16–26, 19–16, 15–23
Pts: L. Tote 15; Rebs: D. Okeke 5 Asts: D. Moretti 3		Pts: N. Martincic 20; Rebs: U. Durnik 7 Asts: Ž. Šiško 11

Melina Merkouri Hall, Rethymno
Attendance: 50
Referees:
(Bosnia and Herzegovina) Petar Obradovic
(Russia) Sergei Beliakov
(Belarus) Andrei Sharapa

17 July 2017
21:15

Boxscore

Spain	88–87	Serbia
Scoring by quarter: 24–20, 19–24, 25–15, 20–28
Pts: S. Yusta 26; Rebs: J. Barreiro 9 Asts: S. Garcia 8		Pts: V. Marinković 16; Rebs: N. Rakocevic 8 Asts: S. Jovanovic 4

Melina Merkouri Hall, Rethymno
Attendance: 450
Referees:
(Latvia) Andris Aunkrogers
(Lithuania) Arturas Sukys
(Turkey) Zafer Yılmaz

== Playoff round ==
=== Round of 16 ===
Round of 16
19 July
Greece	56
Montenegro	49
19 July
Slovenia	61
Lithuania	76
19 July
Germany	80
Turkey	77
19 July
Latvia	52
Spain	96
19 July
Israel	79
Italy	71
19 July
Sweden	39
Iceland	73
19 July
Serbia	98
Ukraine	63
19 July
Czech Republic	61
France	88

Quarterfinals
20 July
Greece	76
Lithuania	72
20 July
Germany	61
Spain	69
20 July
Israel	74
Iceland	54
20 July
Serbia	67
France	86

Semifinals
22 July
Greece	77
Spain	56
22 July
Israel	74
France	52

Final
23 July
Greece	65
Israel	56
3rd place match
23 July
Spain	58
France	72

19 July 2017
14:30

Boxscore

Sweden	39–73	Iceland
Scoring by quarter: 16–18, 5–22, 12–21, 6–12
Pts: D. Hansson 12; Rebs: S. Birgander 21; Asts: D. Hansson 2		Pts: K. Jónsson 15; Rebs: T. Hlinason 12; Asts: B. Gylfason 4

Heraklion Arena, Heraklion
Attendance: 100
Referees:
(Bosnia and Herzegovina) Petar Obradovic
(Czech Republic) Petr Hrusa
(Slovenia) Boris Krejic

19 July 2017
14:30

Boxscore

Turkey	77–80	Germany
Scoring by quarter: 17–18, 14–13, 20–25, 26–24
Pts: E. Arna 21; Rebs: F. Korkmaz 6 Asts: F. Korkmaz 3		Pts: M. Wagner 23; Rebs: T. Schneider 9 Asts: G. Beyschlag 8

Heraklion University Hall, Heraklion
Attendance: 80
Referees:
(Latvia) Andris Aunkrogers
(Montenegro) Zdravko Rutesic
(Croatia) Tomislav Vovk

19 July 2017
16:45

Boxscore

Israel	79–71	Italy
Scoring by quarter: 23–15, 15–18, 17–14, 24–24
Pts: N. Artzi 22; Rebs: D. Koperberg 8 Asts: T. Blatt 16		Pts: L. Tote 27; Rebs: D. Okeke 10; Asts: D. Moretti 9

Heraklion Arena, Heraklion
Attendance: 80
Referees:
(Spain) Vicente Bultó
(Estonia) Tanel Suslov
(Bosnia and Herzegovina) Ademir Zurapovic

19 July 2017
16:45

Boxscore

Spain	96–52	Latvia
Scoring by quarter: 24–11, 33–11, 23–15, 16–15
Pts: S. Yusta 18; Rebs: G. Jou 5 Asts: S. Garcia 6		Pts: R. Blumbergs 12; Rebs: E. Hazners 6 Asts: R. Birkans 4

Heraklion University Hall, Heraklion
Attendance: 150
Referees:
(Greece) Anastasios Piloidis
(Bosnia and Herzegovina) Haris Bijedic
(Cyprus) Ilias Kounelles

19 July 2017
19:00

Boxscore

France	88–61	Czech Republic
Scoring by quarter: 23–17, 23–15, 29–16, 13–13
Pts: Okobo 16; Rebs: Gombauld 10; Asts: Bengaber 6		Pts: Roub 11; Rebs: Novak 6 Asts: Sehnal 5

Heraklion University Hall, Heraklion
Attendance: 150
Referees:
(Serbia) Saša Maricic
(Iceland) Sigmundur Herbertsson
(Lithuania) Arturas Sukys

19 July 2017
19:00

Boxscore

Lithuania	76–61	Slovenia
Scoring by quarter: 22–14, 22–19, 14–15, 18–13
Pts: Echodas 22; Rebs: Echodas 9 Asts: Varnas 7		Pts: Baric 13; Rebs: Baric 6 Asts: Baric 4

Heraklion Arena, Heraklion
Attendance: 100
Referees:
(Italy) Tolga Sahin
(Russia) Ilya Putenko
(Turkey) Zafer Yilmaz

19 July 2017
21:15

Boxscore

Greece	56–49	Montenegro
Scoring by quarter: 17–9, 12–18, 19–13, 8–9
Pts: Charalampopoulos 14; Rebs: Charalampopoulos 8 Asts: Charalampopoulos 4		Pts: Grkovic 11; Rebs: Popovic 8 Asts: Bakic 4

Heraklion Arena, Heraklion
Attendance: 500
Referees:
(Ukraine) Borys Shulga
(Russia) Sergei Beliakov
(Belarus) Andrei Sharapa

19 July 2017
21:15

Boxscore

Serbia	98–63	Ukraine
Scoring by quarter: 24–11, 27–17, 25–14, 22–21
Pts: Marinkovic 17; Rebs: Glisic 10; Asts: Music 4		Pts: Mykhailiuk 18; Rebs: Mykhailiuk 9 Asts: Tkachenko 4

Heraklion University Hall, Heraklion
Attendance: 100
Referees:
(Italy) Alessandro Martolini
(Sweden) Rickard Eriksson
(Israel) Omer Esteron

=== 5th–8th place playoffs ===
5th–8th place semifinals
22 July
Germany	81
Lithuania	85
22 July
Iceland	71
Serbia	89

5th place match
23 July
Lithuania	86
Serbia	102
7th place match
23 July
Germany	79
Iceland	73

=== 9th–16th place playoffs ===
9th–16th place quarterfinals
20 July
Montenegro	83
Slovenia	78
20 July
Latvia	57
Turkey	75
20 July
Sweden	76
Italy	66
20 July
Czech Republic	68
Ukraine	75

9th–12th place semifinals
22 July
Montenegro	72
Turkey	80
22 July
Sweden	74
Ukraine	77

9th place match
23 July
Turkey	85
Ukraine	82
11th place match
23 July
Montenegro	65
Sweden	61

13th–16th place semifinals
22 July
Slovenia	78
Latvia	50
22 July
Italy	55
Czech Republic	53

13th place match
23 July
Slovenia	52
Italy	69
15th place match
23 July
Latvia	77
Czech Republic	80

== Final standings ==
Rank	Team	Record
Gold medal	Greece	7–0
Silver medal	Israel	6–1
Bronze medal	France	6–1
4th	Spain	5–2
5th	Serbia	5–2
6th	Lithuania	4–3
7th	Germany	3–4
8th	Iceland	2–5
9th	Turkey	4–3
10th	Ukraine	3–4
11th	Montenegro	3–4
12th	Sweden	3–4
13th	Italy	2–5
14th	Slovenia	2–5
15th	Czech Republic	1–6
16th	Latvia	0–7

Relegated to the 2018 FIBA U20 European Championship Division B

== Awards ==
=== Most Valuable Player ===
Most Valuable Player
(Greece) Vassilis Charalampopoulos

=== All-Tournament Team ===
- (Israel) Tamir Blatt
- (Greece) Vassilis Charalampopoulos
- (Iceland) Tryggvi Hlinason
- (Greece) Antonis Koniaris
- (France) Amine Noua

== Statistical leaders ==
- In order for players to qualify as statistical leaders for the tournament, they had to play in at least 4 games during the competition.

Points

Name	PPG
(Ukraine) Sviatoslav Mykhailiuk	20.4
(Lithuania) Martynas Echodas	17.1
(Lithuania) Laurynas Birutis	17.0
(Turkey) Ömer Yurtseven	17.0
(Israel) Yovel Zoosman	16.3

Rebounds

Name	RPG
(Sweden) Simon Birgander	13.8
(Montenegro) Miloš Popović	13.8
(Iceland) Tryggvi Hlinason	12.2
(Turkey) Ömer Yurtseven	10.8
(Lithuania) Laurynas Birutis	8.7

Assists

Name	APG
(Israel) Tamir Blatt	9.3
(Lithuania) Laurynas Beliauskas	7.7
(Spain) Sergi García	7.3
(Germany) Georg Beyschlag	5.7
(Slovenia) Žan Mark Šiško	5.7

Blocks

Name	BPG
(Iceland) Tryggvi Hlinason	3.3
(Turkey) Berkan Durmaz	2.3
(Serbia) Boriša Simanić	2.3
(Turkey) Ömer Yurtseven	2.3
2 players	2.0

Steals

Name	SPG
(Greece) Antonios Koniaris	3.3
(Ukraine) Vitaliy Zotov	3.3
(Germany) Moritz Wagner	2.7
(Greece) Nikos Diplaros	2.3
(Greece) Dimitris Flionis	2.3

Efficiency

Name	EPG
(Iceland) Tryggvi Hlinason	28.3
(Israel) Tamir Blatt	27.3
(Sweden) Simon Birgander	26.7
(Lithuania) Laurynas Birutis	24.7
(Lithuania) Martynas Echodas	21.7
