= Nik Slavica =

Croatian basketball player

No. 15 – Adria Oil Škrljevo
- Position: Small forward / power forward
- League: Croatian League

Personal information
- Born: February 7, 1997 (age 29) Šibenik, Croatia
- Listed height: 2.05 m (6 ft 9 in)
- Listed weight: 108 kg (238 lb)

Career information
- NBA draft: 2019: undrafted
- Playing career: 2013–present

Career history
- 2013–2017: Cibona
- 2013–2014: → Zrinjevac
- 2017–2018: Cedevita
- 2018: Cibona
- 2019: Šibenka
- 2020: Adria Oil Škrljevo
- 2021–present: Adria Oil Škrljevo

Career highlights
- Croatian League champion (2018); Croatian Cup winner (2018)
Medals
Men's basketball
Representing Croatia
FIBA U19 World Championship
| Silver medal – second place | 2015 Greece | U-19 Team |
FIBA U18 Europe Championship
| Bronze medal – third place | 2014 Turkey | U-18 Team |

Nik Slavica (born 7 February 1997) is a Croatian professional basketball player for Adria Oil Škrljevo of the Croatian League. He can play at either the small forward or power forward positions, with small forward being his main position.

== Early career ==
He was born in Šibenik to a father Nenad, former basketball player. Slavica moved to Zagreb, as a 10-year-old, to play for Cibona's youth teams, and he spent one season on loan at KK Zrinjevac.

== Professional career ==
Following the conclusion of his loan spell at Zrinjevac, during the 2013–14 season, Slavica returned to his parent club of Cibona, and he became a regular on the club's senior men's team, Cibona Zagreb, seeing action in the Croatian League, the ABA League, and the lower-tier level European-wide competitions of the FIBA Europe Cup, and the Basketball Champions League.

Slavica's name was included on a list of early entry candidates for the 2016 NBA draft, but he ultimately withdrew from the draft before the draft withdrawal deadline.

On 30 September 2017, Slavica signed a multi-year contract with Cedevita. In August 2018, he signed with Cibona. Cibona parted ways with him on 28 December 2018.

On 4 January 2019, he signed with home town club GKK Šibenka, but after the end of the season, the club parted ways with him.

In January, 2020, Slavica signed with Adria Oil Škrljevo of the Croatian League. His stay at Škrljevo ended with the Croatian League being halted due to the covid-crisis. A year and eight months later, in November, 2021, he was re-signed with Škrljevo.

== International career ==
Slavica played for the Croatian under-16 junior national team at the 2013 FIBA Europe Under-16 Championship. He helped the Croatian under-18 junior national team win the bronze medal at the 2014 FIBA Europe Under-18 Championship. He also captured a silver medal with Croatia's under-19 junior national team at the 2015 FIBA Under-19 World Championship, while also receiving an All-World Championship Under-19 Honorable Mention status by the basketball website eurobasket.com.
