= Heraklion Indoor Sports Arena =

Sports arena in Crete Region, Greece

- Dyo Aorakia Indoor Hall, Heraklion New Indoor Hall
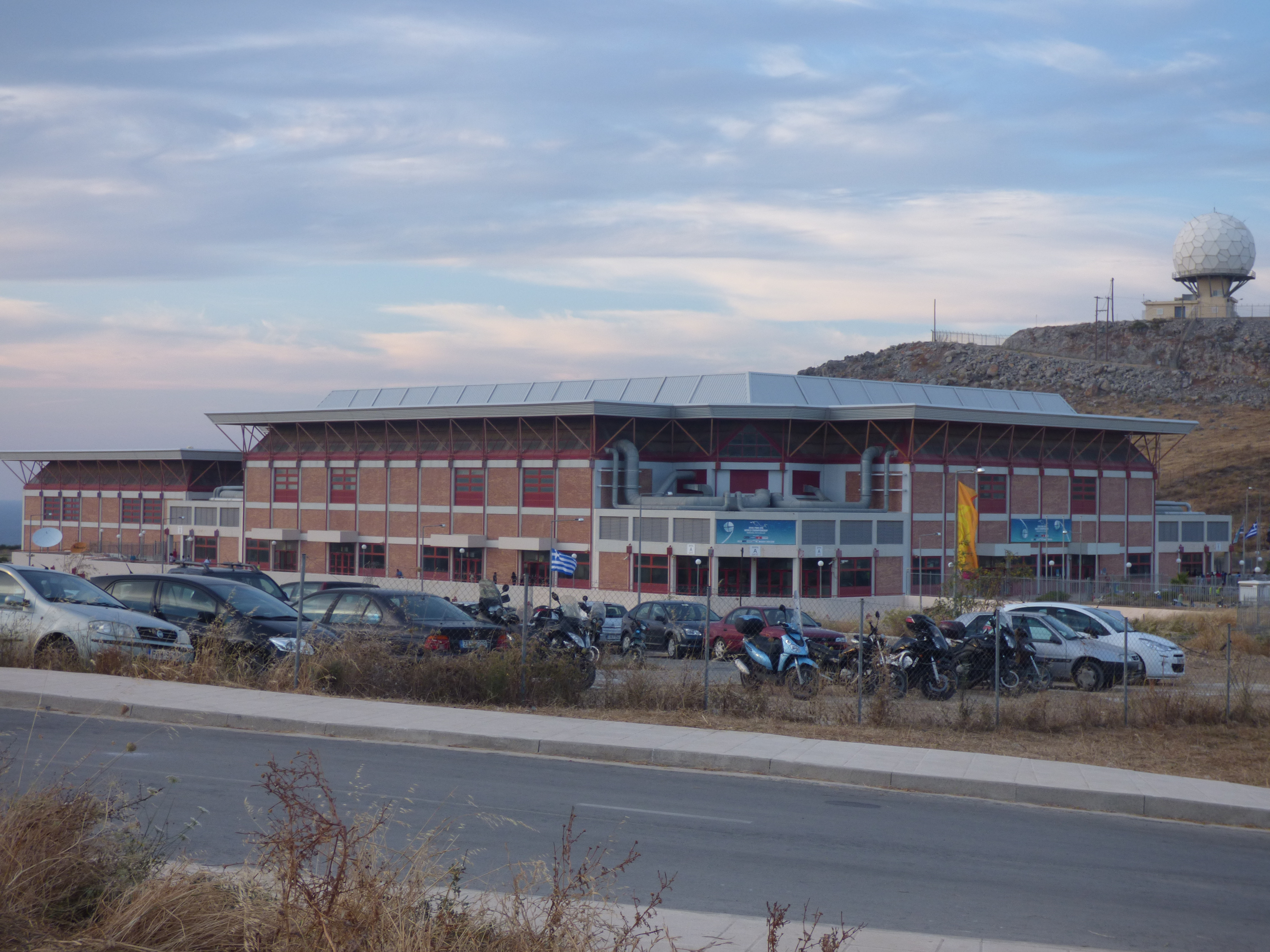
- Heraklion Indoor Sports Arena's exterior.
- Interactive map of Heraklion Indoor Sports Arena
- Full name: Heraklion Indoor Sports Arena
- Location: Heraklion, Crete, Greece
- Coordinates: 35°19′35.955″N 25°10′15.245″E
- Owner: Greek Ministry of Culture, General Secretariat of Sports
- Capacity: Basketball: 5,222 (permanent tier seating); 5,500 (temporary tier seating)
- Surface: Parquet

Construction
- Groundbreaking: 2003
- Opened: 2007
- Cost: €28 million (2003) €34.5 million (in 2016 euros)

Tenants
- Irakleio; OFI; Greek national team (2019 FIBA World Cup qualification games except 2nd Round Game vs.Germany)

Heraklion Indoor Sports Arena, or simply, Heraklion Arena, is a multi-purpose indoor arena that is located in the city of Heraklion, on the island of Crete, in Greece. It is located in a district called Dyo Aorakia (English: Two Aorakia). The arena can be used to host gymnastics, handball, volleyball, basketball, boxing, wrestling, fencing, badminton, table tennis, Judo, MMA, and weightlifting, with its primary use being to host basketball games.

The seating capacity of the arena for basketball games is 5,222 with permanent tier seating, and up to 5,500, including seats for the media, with temporary tier seating. The arena also includes a smaller second sports hall, which is used primarily for training purposes, but that can also host sporting events, a VIP area, a media and press conference room, a weight training room, and a medical room.

== History ==
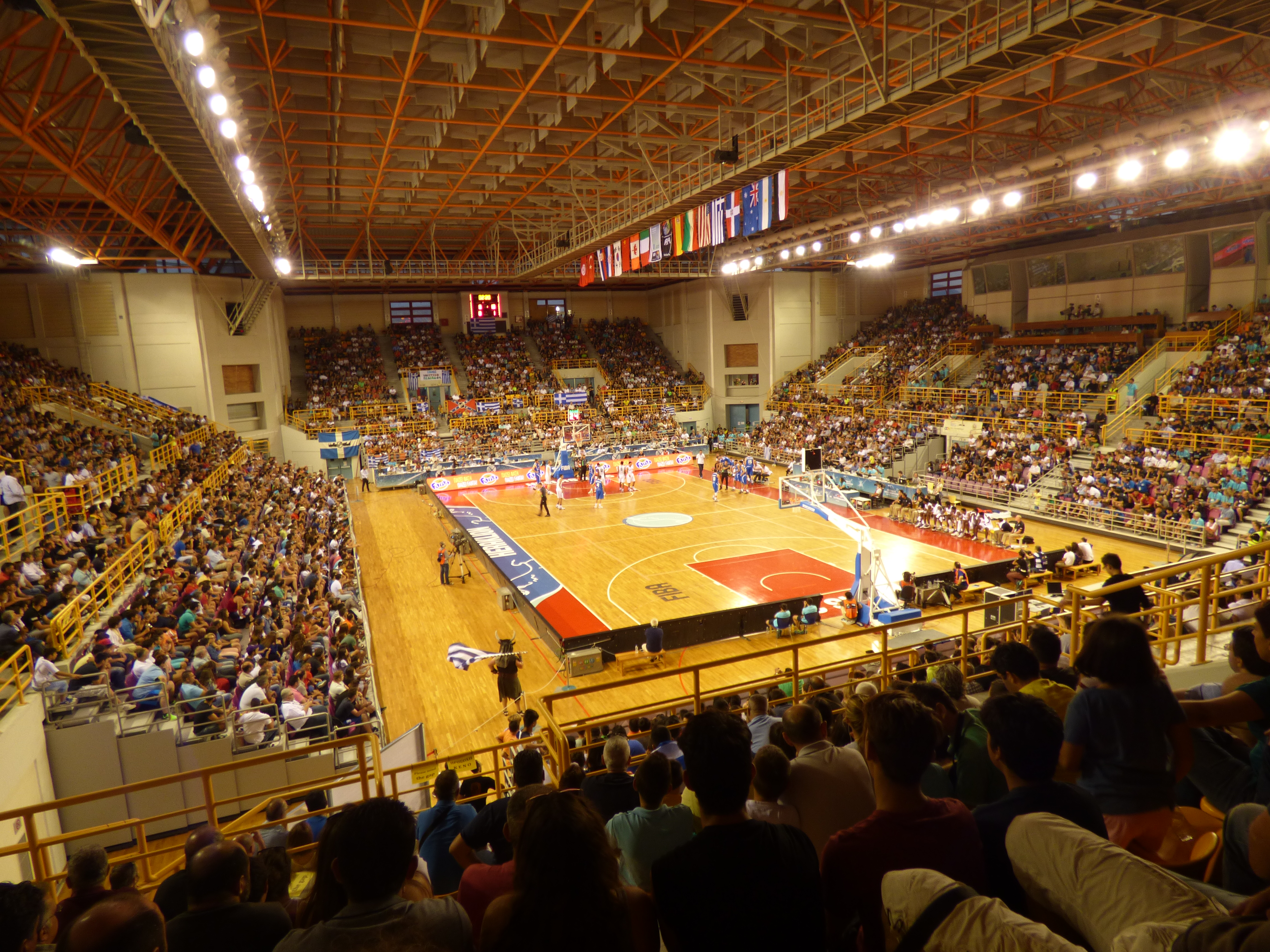
Arena during the 2015 FIBA Under-19 World Cup.

The Hellenic Basketball Federation (E.O.K.) has used the arena for junior Greek national basketball team training, for senior men's Greek national basketball team training and official games, and for Greek Cup games. The arena also hosted the 2010 HEBA Greek All Star Game. On 7 November 2013, Panathinaikos hosted a EuroLeague game against Lokomotiv Kuban at the arena, drawing an attendance of 5,192 people. On 15 October 2015, Olympiacos hosted a EuroLeague game against Cedevita Zagreb at the arena, drawing an attendance of 5,006 people.

The arena also hosted the 2014 FIBA Europe Under-20 Championship, and the 2015 FIBA Under-19 World Cup. During the 2015 FIBA Under-19 World Cup, both the Greece versus Spain and Greece versus USA games, drew crowds of 5,200 people. The arena has also been used as the home arena of the Greek professional basketball club Irakleio. The arena also hosted the final round of the 2017 FIBA Europe Under-20 Championship, where host nation Greece won the final against Israel in front of an audience of 5,200 people.

The arena also hosted most of the senior men's Greek national basketball team's home games during the qualification round for the 2019 FIBA World Cup. In October 2018 it was announced that the arena will host the 2019 Greek Cup Final for a second consecutive year after the 2018 one.

== Events hosted ==
- 2010 Greek Basket League All-Star Game.
- EuroLeague 2013–14 season game between Panathinaikos and Lokomotiv Kuban, November 7, 2013.
- 2014 Greek Cup Final
- EuroLeague 2015–16 season game between Olympiacos and Cedevita Zagreb, October 15, 2015.
- EuroLeague 2017–18 season game between Olympiacos and Baskonia, October 12, 2017.
- 2014 FIBA Europe Under-20 Championship
- 2015 FIBA Under-19 World Cup
- 2017 FIBA Europe Under-20 Championship
- 2018 Greek Cup Final
- 2019 FIBA World Cup qualification
- 2019 Greek Cup Final
- 2019 FIBA Under-19 World Cup
- 2020 Greek Basket League All-Star Game.
- 2020 Greek Cup Final
- 2022 Greek Cup Final Four
- 2023 FIBA U20 European Championship

== See also ==
- List of indoor arenas in Greece
