= Furkan Korkmaz =

Turkish basketball player (born 1997)

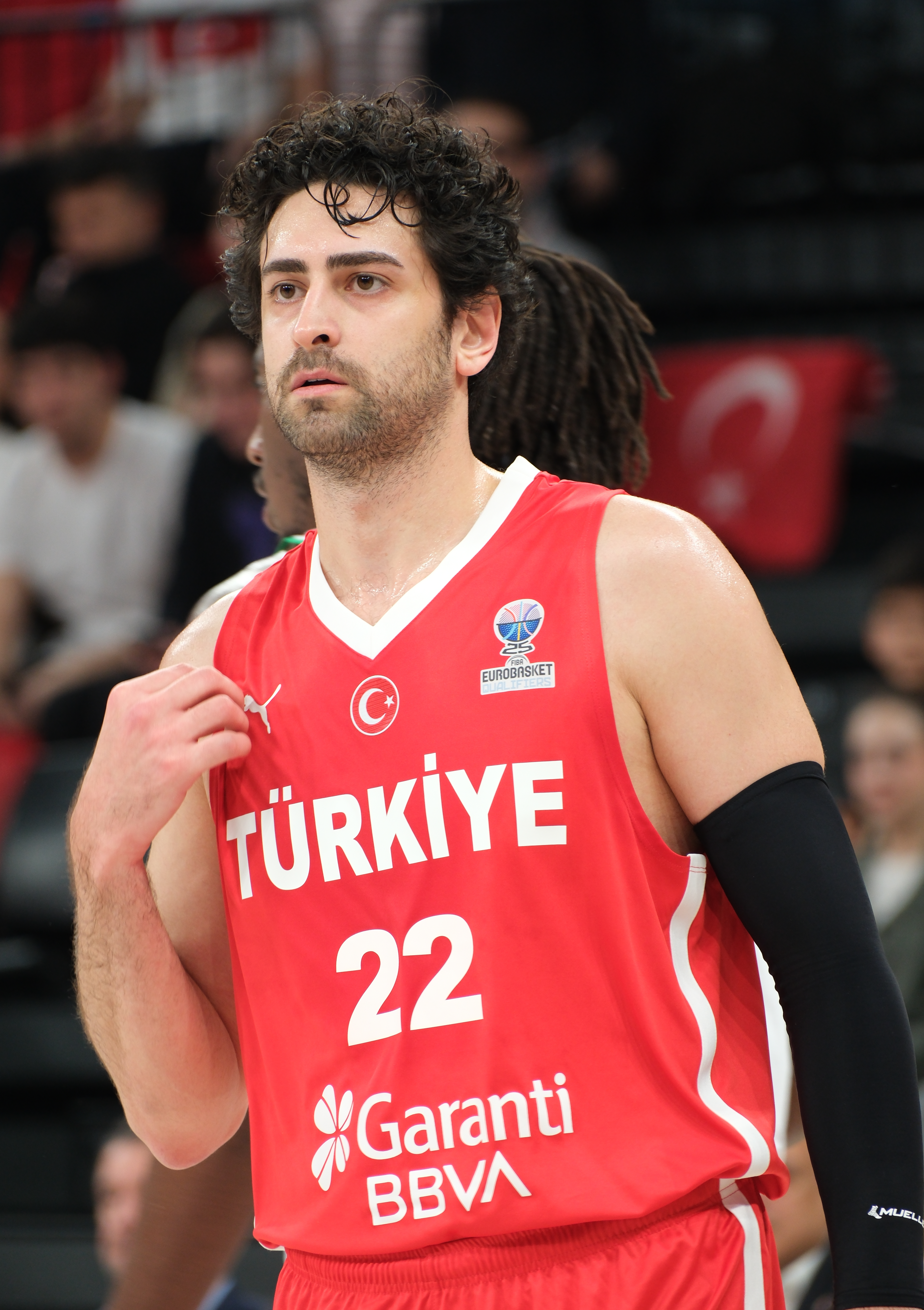
- Korkmaz with Turkey in 2025

No. 30 – Beşiktaş Fuzul
- Position: Small forward / shooting guard
- League: BSL; EuroLeague

Personal information
- Born: July 24, 1997 (age 29) Bakırköy, Istanbul, Turkey
- Listed height: 6 ft 7 in (2.01 m)
- Listed weight: 202 lb (92 kg)

Career information
- NBA draft: 2016: 1st round, 26th overall pick
- Drafted by: Philadelphia 76ers
- Playing career: 2013–present

Career history
- 2013–2017: Anadolu Efes
- 2013–2014: → Pertevniyal
- 2016–2017: → Bandırma
- 2017–2024: Philadelphia 76ers
- 2017: →Delaware 87ers
- 2024: AS Monaco
- 2025: Bahçeşehir Koleji
- 2025–2026: Tofaş
- 2026–present: Beşiktaş

Career highlights
- FIBA Champions League Best Young Player (2017); 2× Turkish Cup winner (2015, 2017); Turkish Supercup winner (2015); 3× Turkish BSL All-Star (2015–2017); Turkish BSL Slam Dunk Contest winner (2016)
- Stats at NBA.com
- Stats at Basketball Reference
Medals
Men's basketball
Representing Turkey
EuroBasket
Silver medal – second place	2025 Cyprus–Finland–Poland–Latvia
U-19 World Cup
Bronze medal – third place	2015 Greece	Team
European U-18 Championship
Gold medal – first place	2014 Turkey	Team
Silver medal – second place	2015 Greece	Team

Furkan Korkmaz (born 24 July 1997) is a Turkish professional basketball player for Beşiktaş of the Turkish Basketbol Süper Ligi (BSL) and the EuroLeague. He was born and raised in Istanbul, and was selected 26th in the 2016 NBA draft by the Philadelphia 76ers. Korkmaz is 6 ft 7 in (2.01 m) tall and plays the shooting guard and small forward positions.

== Early years ==
Korkmaz was born in Bakırköy, Istanbul. He started playing basketball with the school team when he was nine. In 2012, he moved to Anadolu Efes, from Efes' junior team, Yeşilyurt Spor Kulübü, for $250,000, at the age of 15.

== Professional career ==
=== Anadolu Efes (2013–2017) ===
In his first year in the Efes club infrastructure, Korkmaz played for the junior and youth teams of Efes. He was loaned for the 2013–14 season to the Turkish 2nd-tier-level TB2L team Pertevniyal, which was at the time the farm club of Anadolu Efes. In the summer of 2014, Korkmaz moved to the senior men's Anadolu Efes first team. His contract with Efes included a $2 million buyout clause for the NBA.

On June 13, 2016, Korkmaz was one of 13 different international underclassmen to enter the 2016 NBA draft. He was selected 26th in the first round, by the Philadelphia 76ers. After being drafted, Korkmaz decided to return to Anadolu Efes for at least another season.

=== Banvit (2016–2017) ===
In December 2016, Korkmaz was loaned by Anadolu Efes to Banvit. In February 2017, he won the Turkish Cup with Banvit, which was the first trophy in the club's history. In the same season, Korkmaz was the inaugural winner of the Basketball Champions League (BCL) Best Young Player award of the 2016–17 season of the European-wide third-tier level. In the BCL, he reached the championship game of the competition with Banvit, where his team lost 63–59 to Iberostar Tenerife. Korkmaz recorded 4 points and 2 rebounds in the final game.

=== Philadelphia 76ers (2017–2024) ===
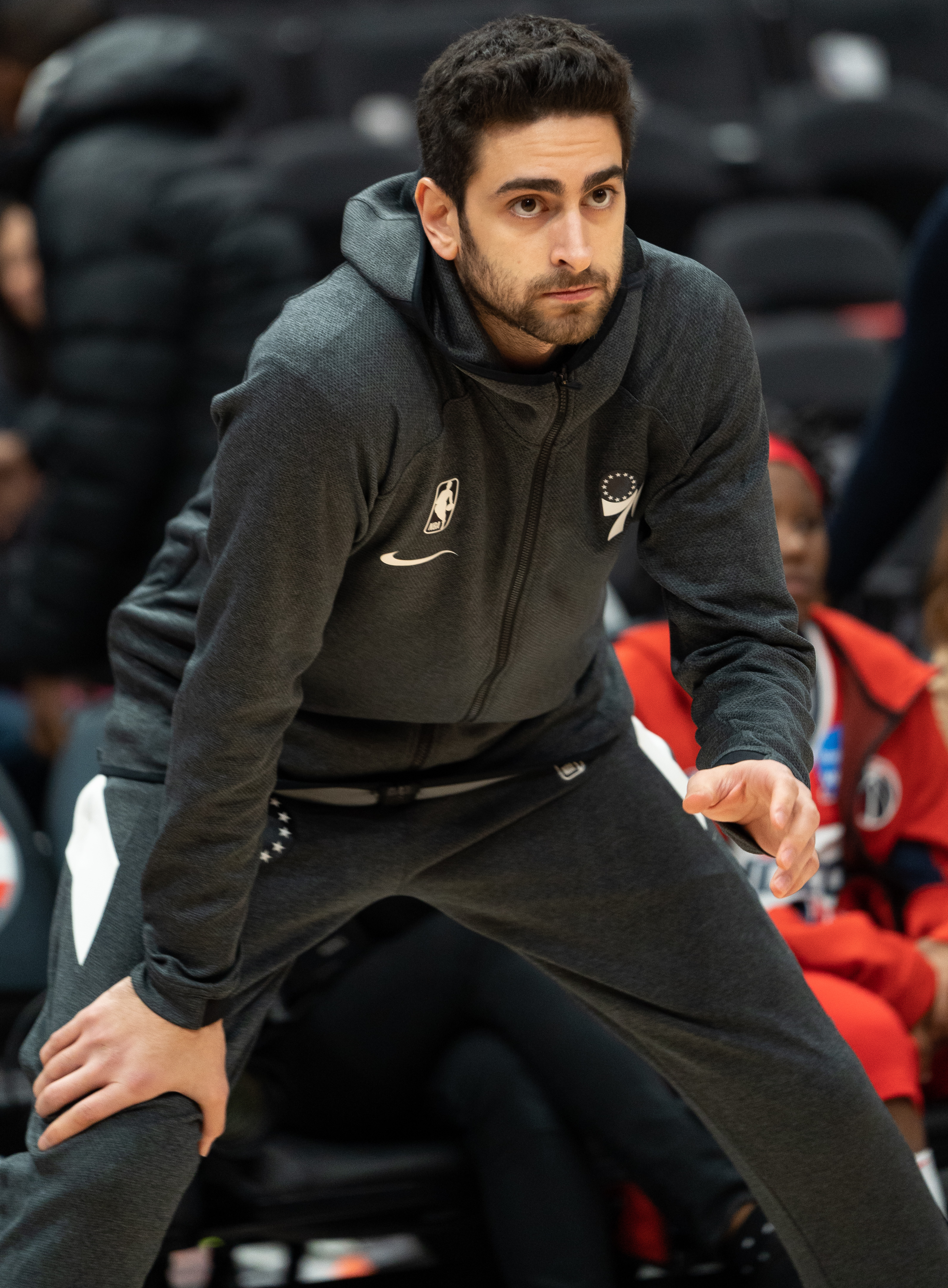
Korkmaz warms up with the Philadelphia 76ers in 2019

On July 4, 2017, Korkmaz signed with the Philadelphia 76ers. During his rookie season, he received multiple assignments to the Delaware 87ers of the NBA G League.

In Philadelphia's first game of the 2018 NBA Summer League, Korkmaz scored 40 points (including 8 three-pointers) in 28 minutes during an 89–95 loss to the Boston Celtics. It was the fifth-best scoring performance in Summer League history.

After not seeing much playing time, Korkmaz requested a trade from the 76ers in November 2018. However, he ultimately stayed with the team On December 10, Korkmaz scored 18 points off the bench in a win over the Detroit Pistons. On December 12, he had his first career start in place of the injured Jimmy Butler.

On July 25, 2019, Korkmaz re-signed with the 76ers on a two-year contract. Throughout the season, he had made his way in and out the starting lineup, playing both shooting guard and small forward. On November 2, Korkmaz hit the game-winner against the Portland Trail Blazers. On February 7, 2020, Korkmaz scored a career-high 34 points off the bench against the Memphis Grizzlies. One game later, Korkmaz went off again, scoring 31 points off the bench against the Chicago Bulls. Korkmaz started 12 games, and averaged a career-high 21.7 minutes a game, and established career-high averages in points and rebounds per game at 9.8 and 2.3, respectively, while shooting a career-high 40.2% in three-point field goal accuracy.

In the 2020–21 season, Korkmaz had 11 starts in the abbreviated season, and averaged 9.1 points per game, along with 2.1 rebounds per game and 37.5% three-point shooting. He had career highs in assists and steals per game, at 1.5 and 0.9, respectively. In the playoffs, Korkmaz made four starts in the 2021 Eastern Conference semifinals against the Atlanta Hawks when Danny Green was injured, ending his season.

On August 9, 2021, Korkmaz re-signed with the 76ers on a three-year contract.

In February 2023, Korkmaz requested a trade from the 76ers for the second time during his stint with the team.

On February 8, 2024, Korkmaz was traded to the Indiana Pacers in a three-team deal involving the Philadelphia 76ers and was waived the next day.

=== AS Monaco (2024) ===
On August 7, 2024, Korkmaz signed with AS Monaco of the LNB Élite.

In October 2024, Korkmaz suffered a slight tear in the right adductor and was expected to miss three to four weeks of action.

=== Bahçeşehir Koleji (2025) ===
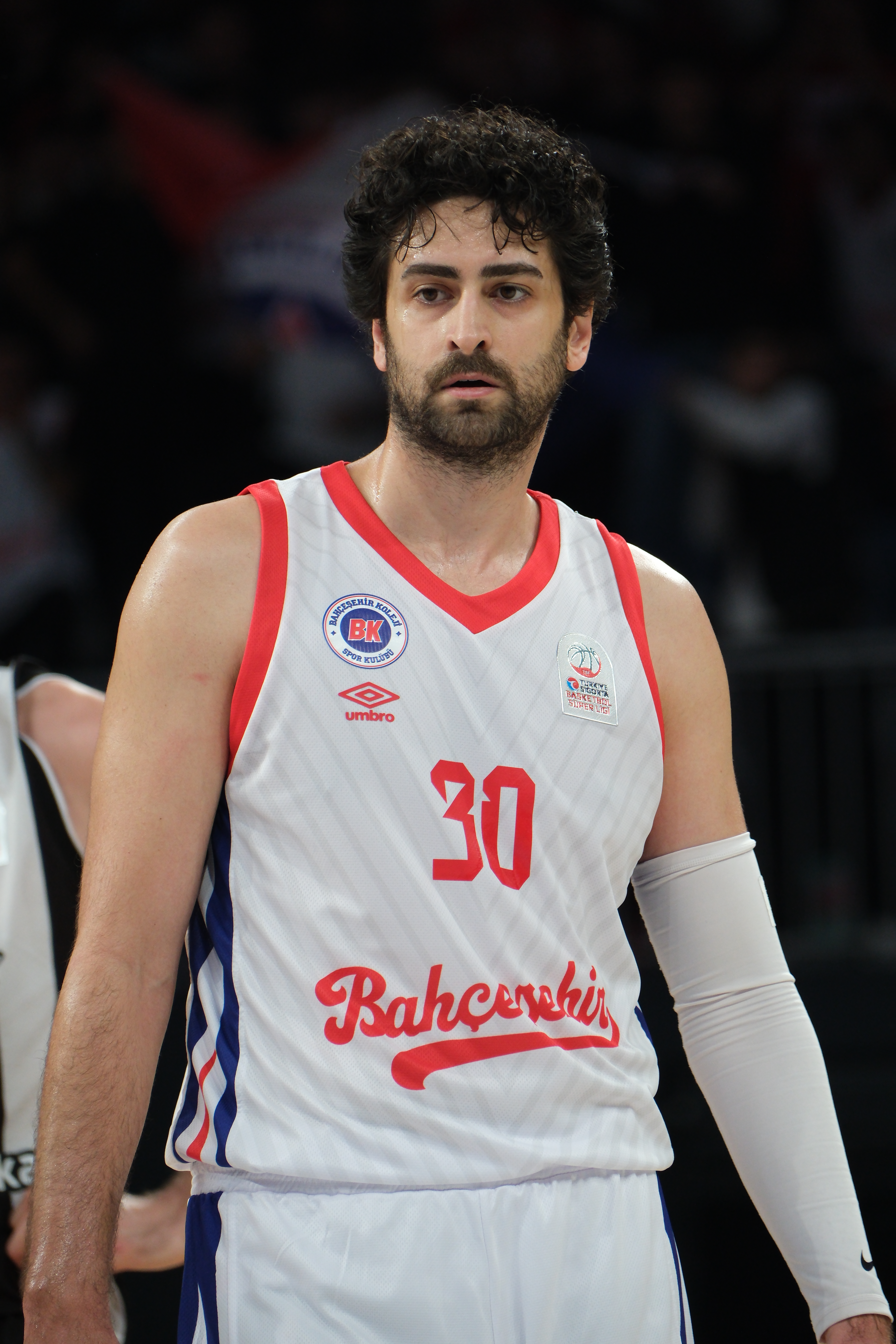
Korkmaz with Bahçeşehir Koleji in 2025

On December 30, 2024, Korkmaz signed with Bahçeşehir Koleji of the Basketbol Süper Ligi (BSL).

=== Tofaş (2025–2026) ===
On October 31, 2025, Korkmaz signed with Tofaş of the Basketbol Süper Ligi (BSL).

=== Beşiktaş (2026–present) ===

On July 2, 2026, Korkmaz signed with Beşiktaş of the Basketbol Süper Ligi (BSL).

== National team career ==
=== Junior national team ===
Korkmaz was a member of the junior national teams of Turkey. With Turkey's junior national teams, he played at: the 2013 FIBA Europe Under-16 Championship, which he led in scoring, the 2014 FIBA Europe Under-18 Championship, where he won a gold medal, the 2015 FIBA Europe Under-18 Championship, where he won a silver medal and was named to the All-Tournament Team, and at the 2015 FIBA Under-19 World Cup, where he won a bronze medal and was named to the All-Tournament Team.

He also played at the 2017 FIBA Europe Under-20 Championship, where he averaged 30.8 points, 10.6 rebounds, 10.8 assists, 8.6 steals, and 2.2 blocks per game, in 30.3 minutes per game. At the 2017 Under-20 tournament, he also shot 35.6% overall from the field, 27.6% from three-point range, and 66.7% from free throw range.

=== Senior national team ===
Korkmaz played with the senior men's Turkish national basketball team at the EuroBasket 2015, and at the 2016 Manila FIBA World Olympic Qualifying Tournament. He also played at EuroBasket 2017.

== Honors ==
=== Club honors ===
Senior club honors

- Turkish Cup Winner: 2015, 2017
- Turkish Supercup Winner: 2015

=== Turkish junior national team ===
- 2014 FIBA Europe Under-18 Championship: Gold
- 2015 FIBA Europe Under-18 Championship: Silver
- 2015 FIBA Under-19 World Cup: Bronze

=== Individual ===
- 2013 FIBA Europe Under-16 Championship: Top Scorer
- 2015 FIBA Europe Under-18 Championship: All Tournament Team
- 2015 FIBA Under-19 World Cup: All Tournament Team
- FIBA Champions League Best Young Player: 2016–17

== Career statistics ==
Legend
GP	Games played	GS	Games started	MPG	Minutes per game
FG%	Field-goal percentage	3P%	3-point field-goal percentage	FT%	Free-throw percentage
RPG	Rebounds per game	APG	Assists per game	SPG	Steals per game
BPG	Blocks per game	PPG	Points per game	PIR	Performance index rating
**Bold**	Career high

=== NBA ===
==== Regular season ====
Year	Team	GP	GS	MPG	FG%	3P%	FT%	RPG	APG	SPG	BPG	PPG
2017–18	Philadelphia	14	0	5.7	.286	.294	.500	.8	.3	.1	.1	1.6
2018–19	Philadelphia	48	7	14.1	.400	.326	**.818**	2.2	1.1	.6	.0	5.8
2019–20	Philadelphia	**72**	12	**21.7**	.430	**.402**	.755	2.3	1.1	.6	**.2**	**9.8**
2020–21	Philadelphia	55	11	19.3	.401	.375	.732	2.1	1.5	**.9**	.2	9.1
2021–22	Philadelphia	67	**19**	21.1	.387	.289	.810	**2.6**	**1.9**	.5	.1	7.6
2022–23	Philadelphia	37	0	9.5	**.432**	.391	.722	1.1	.6	.3	.1	3.8
2023–24	Philadelphia	35	0	8.6	.395	.350	.700	.9	.7	.4	.1	2.5
Career		328	49	16.6	.406	.356	.761	2.0	1.2	.5	.1	6.8

==== Playoffs ====
Year	Team	GP	GS	MPG	FG%	3P%	FT%	RPG	APG	SPG	BPG	PPG
2018	Philadelphia	1	0	1.6	**1.000**	**1.000**	—	.0	.0	.0	.0	3.0
2019	Philadelphia	4	0	8.9	.333	.375	.800	1.5	**1.3**	.0	**.3**	4.8
2020	Philadelphia	4	0	10.1	.000	.000	.600	1.5	.5	.3	.0	.8
2021	Philadelphia	**12**	**4**	**16.2**	.411	.318	.714	**2.0**	.6	**.6**	**.3**	**7.0**
2022	Philadelphia	9	0	6.8	.478	.400	**1.000**	1.3	.4	.1	.1	3.1
2023	Philadelphia	3	0	3.8	.000	.000	**1.000**	.3	.3	.0	.0	.7
Career		33	4	10.4	.387	.314	.750	1.5	.6	.3	.2	4.2

=== EuroLeague ===
Year	Team	GP	GS	MPG	FG%	3P%	FT%	RPG	APG	SPG	BPG	PPG	PIR
2014–15	Anadolu Efes	**19**	1	**10.7**	**.408**	.414	**.789**	**1.4**	**.8**	.6	**.2**	**3.5**	**3.8**
2015–16	Anadolu Efes	**19**	**5**	8.8	.391	**.423**	.571	0.9	.5	.1	**.2**	2.7	1.4
2016–17	Anadolu Efes	2	0	7.0	.200	.000	.000	0.5	.5	**1.5**	.0	1.0	1.5
Career		40	6	9.6	.390	.411	.731	1.1	.7	.4	.1	3.0	2.6
