= Marko Arapović =

Croatian basketball player

Free agent
- Position: Power forward / center

Personal information
- Born: July 20, 1996 (age 30) Zagreb, Croatia
- Listed height: 2.07 m (6 ft 9 in)
- Listed weight: 105 kg (231 lb)

Career information
- NBA draft: 2018: undrafted
- Playing career: 2011–present

Career history
- 2011–2012: Kaptol
- 2012–2014: Cibona
- 2014–2018: Cedevita
- 2018–2020: Galatasaray
- 2021–2022: Krka

Career highlights
- Adriatic League (2014); 5× Croatian League (2013, 2015–2018); 5× Croatian Cup (2013, 2015–2018)
Medals
Men's basketball
Representing Croatia
FIBA U19 World Cup
Silver medal – second place	2015 Greece	U-19 Team
FIBA U17 World Cup
Bronze medal – third place	2012 Lithuania	U-17 Team
FIBA Europe Under-18 Championship
Silver medal – second place	2013 Latvia	U-18 Team
Bronze medal – third place	2014 Turkey	U-18 Team
FIBA Europe Under-16 Championship
Gold medal – first place	2011 Czech Republic	U-16 Team

Marko Arapović (born 20 July 1996) is a Croatian professional basketball player who last played for Krka of the Slovenian League. He plays at the power forward and center positions.

== Professional career ==
Arapović played in the 2015–16 EuroLeague season with Cedevita. Arapović severely injured his left knee during an ABA League semi-final play-off match against Partizan in April 2017. After 13 months of rehabilitation he started playing again in May 2018.

On September 13, 2020, Arapović signed with Split of the Croatian League. Four days later, Split parted ways with him.

On August 17, 2021, he has signed with Krka of the Slovenian League.

== National team career ==
As a member of the Croatia junior national team, Arapović was named to the All-Tournament Team of the 2015 FIBA Under-19 World Cup, where he also won a silver medal.

Arapović was a member of the senior Croatia national basketball team at the 2016 Summer Olympics, but did not spend any time on court.

== Personal life ==
Arapović's father is Franjo Arapović, a former professional basketball player.
