= Diego Flaccadori =

Italian basketball player

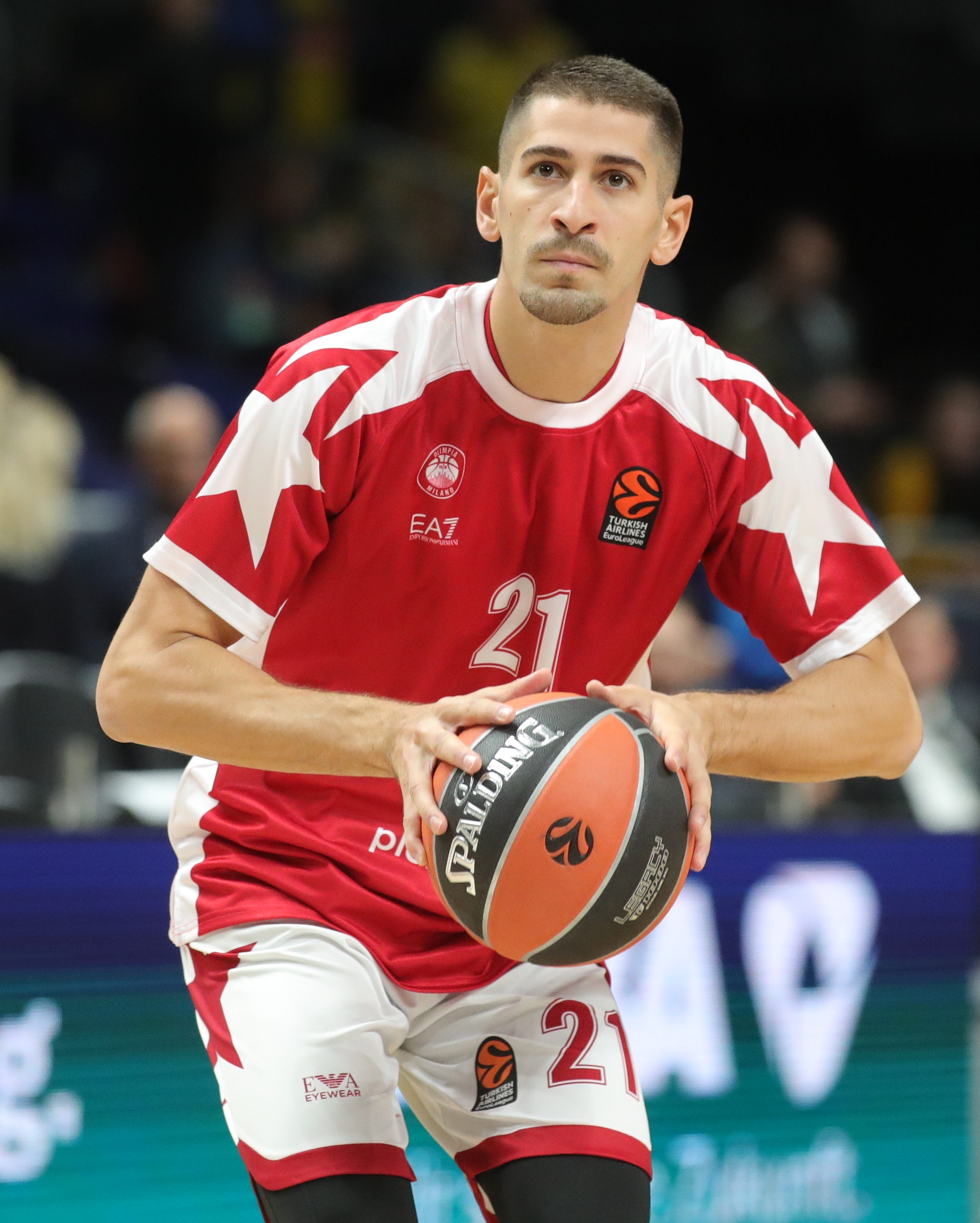
- Flaccadori with Olimpia Milano in 2023

No. 21 – Olimpia Milano
- Position: Point guard / shooting guard
- League: LBA; EuroLeague

Personal information
- Born: 5 April 1996 (age 30) Seriate, Italy
- Listed height: 6 ft 4.75 in (1.95 m)
- Listed weight: 177 lb (80 kg)

Career information
- Playing career: 2014–present

Career history
- 2014–2019: Aquila Trento
- 2019–2021: Bayern Munich
- 2021–2022: →Aquila Trento
- 2022–2023: Aquila Trento
- 2023–present: Olimpia Milano

Career highlights
- 2× Lega Serie A champion (2024, 2026); Italian Cup winner (2026); 3× Italian Supercup winner (2024–2026); 3× LBA Best Player Under 22 (2016–2018)

Diego Flaccadori (born 5 April 1996) is an Italian professional basketball player for Olimpia Milano of the Italian Lega Basket Serie A (LBA) and the EuroLeague. He stands 195 cm (6’4¾") tall, and he can play at both the point guard and shooting guard positions.

== Professional career ==
Flaccadori came through the youth ranks of Excelsior Pallacanestro Bergamo, before transferring to Basket Treviglio, where he made his debut for the club's men's team in the amateur Italian third division during the 2013–14 campaign. He played 26 games in his first year in men's basketball, averaging 2.5 points a contest.

Flaccadori then joined Dolomiti Energia Trento of the professional Italian top-flight level league Serie A in August 2014. In his first season with the team, he saw the court in 34 games in the Italian League, scoring 2.8 points per outing. In the 2015–16 season, he marked his debut on the European club stage, participating in the European 2nd tier Eurocup competition with Trento.

He was an early entry candidate for the 2016 NBA draft, but later removed his name from the list.

On 31 July 2019 Flaccadori signed a two-year contract with Bayern Munich of the German Basketball Bundesliga (BBL) and the EuroLeague.

On 20 July 2021 Flaccadori returned to his former team Aquila Trento on a one-year loan.

== National team ==
Flaccadori was part of the Italian junior national teams on several occasions. He competed in the 2012 FIBA Europe Under-16 Championship, guided the Italian Under-18 national team to gold at the 2014 Albert Schweitzer Tournament, he was picked by the website Eurobasket.com for their unofficial 2014 FIBA Europe Under-18 Championship's Second Team the same year, was named to Eurobasket.com's unofficial 2015 FIBA Under-19 World Championship All-Second Team, and also played at the 2015 FIBA Europe Under-20 Championship.

== Career statistics ==
Legend
GP	Games played	GS	Games started	MPG	Minutes per game
FG%	Field-goal percentage	3P%	3-point field-goal percentage	FT%	Free-throw percentage
RPG	Rebounds per game	APG	Assists per game	SPG	Steals per game
BPG	Blocks per game	PPG	Points per game	PIR	Performance index rating
**Bold**	Career high

=== EuroLeague ===
Year	Team	GP	GS	MPG	FG%	3P%	FT%	RPG	APG	SPG	BPG	PPG	PIR
2019–20	Bayern Munich	22	0	8.5	.356	.143	.727	.5	.6	.1	**.1**	1.9	0.6
2020–21	Bayern Munich	22	4	5.3	.370	**.375**	.800	.5	.7	.1	—	1.2	0.7
2023–24	Olimpia Milano	**26**	**8**	**13.9**	**.375**	.286	**.889**	**1.0**	**1.1**	**.7**	—	**4.6**	**2.8**
Career		70	12	9.5	.370	.266	.837	.7	.8	.3	.0	2.7	1.5

=== EuroCup ===
Year	Team	GP	GS	MPG	FG%	3P%	FT%	RPG	APG	SPG	BPG	PPG	PIR
2015–16	Aquila Trento	**22**	4	15.1	**.427**	.375	**.846**	1.1	1.0	.6	—	5.8	4.5
2017–18	Aquila Trento	16	3	20.9	.292	.122	.795	2.1	2.3	.9	—	6.4	4.4
2018–19	Aquila Trento	8	2	26.5	.419	.261	.727	3.0	3.1	**1.4**	**.3**	10.3	10.8
2021–22	Aquila Trento	15	**15**	27.1	.381	.289	.820	3.1	2.9	.8	—	10.4	8.7
2022–23	Aquila Trento	16	**15**	**27.4**	.420	**.415**	.831	**3.6**	**4.6**	1.2	—	**12.9**	**14.2**
Career		77	39	22.4	.387	.304	.807	2.4	2.6	.9	.0	8.8	8.0

=== Domestic leagues ===
Year	Team	League	GP	MPG	FG%	3P%	FT%	RPG	APG	SPG	BPG	PPG
2013–14	(Italy) BCC Treviglio	Serie A2	20	9.1	.389	.250	.429	1.1	.9	.4	.1	2.6
2014–15	(Italy) Aquila Trento	LBA	25	6.9	.415	.393	.833	.8	.4	.3	—	2.8
2015–16	(Italy) Aquila Trento	LBA	33	15.4	.361	.354	.804	1.7	.9	.5	.1	5.0
2016–17	(Italy) Aquila Trento	LBA	44	21.7	.435	.358	.764	2.2	1.6	.8	.2	9.2
2017–18	(Italy) Aquila Trento	LBA	37	21.7	.372	.326	.737	1.7	1.6	1.0	.1	8.8
2018–19	(Italy) Aquila Trento	LBA	33	21.4	.357	.290	.734	2.4	1.4	.9	.1	8.2
2019–20	(Germany) Bayern Munich	BBL	23	13.4	.388	.250	.793	1.0	1.3	.5	.1	4.2
2020–21	(Germany) Bayern Munich	BBL	24	19.9	.458	.350	.750	2.0	3.8	.8	.1	7.2
2021–22	(Italy) Aquila Trento	LBA	30	31.4	.447	.385	.831	3.9	3.7	1.1	.1	15.3
2022–23	(Italy) Aquila Trento	LBA	33	28.9	.417	.321	.792	4.0	3.3	1.1	.1	13.2
2023–24	(Italy) Olimpia Milano	LBA	39	17.3	.382	.313	.757	1.3	1.7	.6	.1	5.6
