= 2015 FIBA Under-19 World Championship =

U-19 International Basketball tournament

Tournament details
- Host country: Greece
- City: Heraklion
- Dates: 27 June – 5 July
- Teams: 16 (from 5 confederations)
- Venue(s): 2 (in 1 host city)

Final positions
- Champions: United States (6th title)

Tournament statistics
- MVP: (United States) Jalen Brunson
- Top scorer: (Dominican Republic) Feliz (18.9)
- Top rebounds: (Iran) Yousefvand (13.9)
- Top assists: (South Korea) Yoo (6.4)
- PPG (Team): United States (88.3)
- RPG (Team): Canada (51.1)
- APG (Team): Croatia (21.7)

Official website
- www.fiba.basketball

The 2015 FIBA Under-19 World Championship (Greek: Παγκόσμιο Πρωτάθλημα FIBA Under-19 2015) was the 12th edition of the FIBA U19 World Championship, the biennial international men's youth basketball championship contested by the U19 national teams of the member associations of FIBA. It was hosted by Heraklion, Greece, from 27 June to 5 July 2015. It was the third time that Greece hosted the tournament since 1995.

As a result of FIBA rules changes, made effective as of 1 October 2014, this tournament marked the first time that the FIBA Under-19 World Championship used instant replay to review controversial plays and where players were allowed to wear any jersey with numbers from "00" to "99".

The United States won their sixth title by defeating Croatia 79–71 in the final.

== Venues ==
Heraklion		2015 FIBA Under-19 World Championship is located in Greece
Heraklion Indoor Sports Arena	Heraklion University Sports Hall	2015 FIBA Under-19 World Championship is located in Greece
Capacity: 5,222	Capacity: 1,080	2015 FIBA Under-19 World Championship is located in Greece

== Qualified teams ==
Means of qualification	Date	Venue	Berths	Qualified
Host nation	4 February 2014		1	Greece
2014 FIBA Europe Under-18 Championship	24 July – 3 August 2014	Turkey	5	Turkey; Serbia; Croatia; Spain; Italy
2014 FIBA Americas Under-18 Championship	20–24 June 2014	United States	4	United States; Canada; Dominican Republic; Argentina
2014 FIBA Asia Under-18 Championship	19–28 August 2014	Qatar	3	China; Iran; South Korea
2014 FIBA Africa Under-18 Championship	2–10 August 2014	Madagascar	2	Egypt; Tunisia
2014 FIBA Oceania Under-18 Championship	1–6 December 2014	Fiji	1	Australia
Total			16	

== Preliminary round ==
The draw for the tournament was held on 12 March 2015.

All times are local (UTC+3).

=== Group A ===
Pos	Team	Pld	W	L	PF	PA	PD	Pts
1	United States	3	3	0	278	184	+94	6
2	Croatia	3	2	1	278	207	+71	5
3	Egypt	3	1	2	180	262	−82	4
4	Iran	3	0	3	148	231	−83	3

Source: FIBA.com

27 June 2015
17:45

Boxscore

Iran	53–83	United States
Scoring by quarter: 15–15, 9–26, 13–23, 16–19
Pts: Rezaeifar 20; Rebs: Yousefvand 11; Asts: Rezaeifar, Yousefvand 5		Pts: Jackson 20; Rebs: Jackson 10; Asts: Evans 6

Heraklion Indoor Sports Arena, Heraklion
Referees: Michael Weiland (CAN), Hatim Al-Harbi (KSA), Timothy Brown (NZL)

27 June 2015
20:30

Boxscore

Croatia	111–68	Egypt
Scoring by quarter: 26–13, 28–17, 27–17, 30–21
Pts: Slavica 19; Rebs: Slavica 10; Asts: Filipović, Slavica 4		Pts: Abdelrahman 10; Rebs: Khalaf 7 Asts: M. Mohamed 2

Heraklion University Sports Hall, Heraklion
Referees: Elias Koromilas (GRE), José Fernandez (CRC), Ilya Putenko (RUS)

28 June 2015
18:15

Boxscore

United States	103–81	Croatia
Scoring by quarter: 31–22, 27–17, 24–24, 21–18
Pts: Tatum 22; Rebs: Jackson 10; Asts: Brunson 8		Pts: Arapović, Žižić 16; Rebs: Žižić 9 Asts: Slavica 6

Heraklion Indoor Sports Arena, Heraklion
Referees: Guilherme Locatelli (BRA), Ilya Putenko (RUS), Américo Rodríguez (VEN)

28 June 2015
20:00

Boxscore

Egypt	62–59	Iran
Scoring by quarter: 20–17, 20–4, 12–16, 10–22
Pts: T. Mohamed 17; Rebs: Khalaf 7 Asts: Abdelrahman 4		Pts: Yousefvand 22; Rebs: Yousefvand 21; Asts: Rezaeifar 4

Heraklion University Sports Hall, Heraklion
Attendance: 60
Referees: Jean-Charles Collin (FRA), Samir Abaakil (MAR), Rabah Noujaim (LIB)

30 June 2015
16:00

Boxscore

Croatia	86–36	Iran
Scoring by quarter: 17–13, 16–11, 25–7, 28–9
Pts: Božić, Zubac 11; Rebs: Arapović 12; Asts: Kapusta 5		Pts: Rezaeifar 8 Rebs: Yousefvand 4 Asts: Rezaei 3

Heraklion University Sports Hall, Heraklion
Attendance: 80
Referees: Elias Koromilas (GRE), Carlos Júlio (ANG), Rabah Noujaim (LIB)

30 June 2015
16:00

Boxscore

United States	92–50	Egypt
Scoring by quarter: 24–15, 23–8, 20–18, 25–9
Pts: three players 13; Rebs: Giles 12; Asts: Brunson 6		Pts: Khalaf 8 Rebs: Mostafa 8 Asts: M. Mohamed 4

Heraklion Indoor Sports Arena, Heraklion
Referees: Borys Shulga (UKR), Hatim Al-Harbi (KSA), Américo Rodriguez (VEN)

=== Group B ===
Pos	Team	Pld	W	L	PF	PA	PD	Pts
1	Turkey	3	3	0	208	180	+28	6
2	Spain	3	2	1	224	196	+28	5
3	China	3	1	2	198	213	−15	4
4	Argentina	3	0	3	182	223	−41	3

Source: FIBA.com

27 June 2015
13:15

Boxscore

Argentina	64–74	Turkey
Scoring by quarter: 12–18, 9–22, 18–10, 25–24
Pts: Vaulet 15; Rebs: Delfino, Rupcic 6 Asts: Vildoza 4		Pts: Korkmaz 14; Rebs: Arar 10; Asts: Geçim 6

Heraklion Indoor Sports Arena, Heraklion
Referees: Roberto Vázquez (PUR), Jean-Charles Collin (FRA), Rabah Noujaim (LIB)

27 June 2015
16:00

Boxscore

Spain	84–73	China
Scoring by quarter: 17–14, 21–16, 27–27, 19–16
Pts: S. García 19; Rebs: Sima 8 Asts: S. García 8		Pts: Hu Jinqiu 22; Rebs: Hu Jinqiu 11; Asts: Shi Yi 7

Heraklion University Sports Hall, Heraklion
Referees: Guilherme Locatelli (BRA), Aleksandar Glišić (SRB), Ferdinand Pascual (PHI)

28 June 2015
13:15

Boxscore

China	74–67	Argentina
Scoring by quarter: 8–13, 24–14, 14–19, 28–21
Pts: Zhao Yanhao 23; Rebs: Hu Jinqiu 14; Asts: Zhao Yanhao 3		Pts: Vaulet 16; Rebs: Vaulet 8 Asts: three players 3

Heraklion University Sports Hall, Heraklion
Attendance: 70
Referees: Michael Weiland (CAN), Aleksandar Glišić (SRB), Thomas Short (USA)

28 June 2015
16:00

Boxscore

Turkey	72–65	Spain
Scoring by quarter: 18–12, 26–17, 17–16, 11–20
Pts: Korkmaz 14; Rebs: Olmaz 8 Asts: Geçim 6		Pts: Alonso 14; Rebs: Sima 11; Asts: Alonso, S. García 3

Heraklion Indoor Sports Arena, Heraklion
Referees: Roberto Vázquez (PUR), Petar Obradović (BIH), Borys Shulga (UKR)

30 June 2015
13:45

Boxscore

Argentina	51–75	Spain
Scoring by quarter: 3–22, 9–20, 17–17, 22–16
Pts: Gerhardt, Gramajo 9 Rebs: Rupcic 6 Asts: three players 2		Pts: M. García 18; Rebs: Sima 10; Asts: Díaz, López-Arostegui 3

Heraklion University Sports Hall, Heraklion
Referees: Guilherme Locatelli (BRA), Timothy Brown (NZL), Ilya Putenko (RUS)

30 June 2015
13:45

Boxscore

China	51–62	Turkey
Scoring by quarter: 17–11, 17–16, 10–15, 7–20
Pts: Hu Jinqiu 18; Rebs: Hu Jinqiu 13; Asts: Shi Yi 10		Pts: Güven 12; Rebs: Arar 12; Asts: Geçim 7

Heraklion Indoor Sports Arena, Heraklion
Referees: Michael Weiland (CAN), Jean-Charles Collin (FRA), Piotr Pastusiak (POL)

=== Group C ===
Pos	Team	Pld	W	L	PF	PA	PD	Pts
1	Canada	3	3	0	245	161	+84	6
2	Italy	3	2	1	212	207	+5	5
3	Australia	3	1	2	231	207	+24	4
4	Tunisia	3	0	3	162	275	−113	3

Source: FIBA.com

27 June 2015
13:45

Boxscore

Italy	89–62	Tunisia
Scoring by quarter: 23–15, 28–16, 19–14, 19–17
Pts: Flaccadori 21; Rebs: Severini 8 Asts: Flaccadori 8		Pts: Gannouni 15; Rebs: Dhif 8 Asts: Gannouni, Jawadi 3

Heraklion University Sports Hall, Heraklion
Referees: Borys Shulga (UKR), Carlos Júlio (ANG), Américo Rodriguez (VEN)

27 June 2015
15:30

Boxscore

Canada	74–71	Australia
Scoring by quarter: 17–8, 13–22, 22–18, 22–23
Pts: Brooks 22; Rebs: Egi 11; Asts: three players 2		Pts: Vasiljevic 14; Rebs: White 8 Asts: Wilson 4

Heraklion Indoor Sports Arena, Heraklion
Referees: Damir Javor (SLO), Thomas Short (USA), Fabricio Vito (ARG)

28 June 2015
13:45

Boxscore

Australia	67–69	Italy
Scoring by quarter: 16–22, 13–15, 21–11, 17–21
Pts: McVeigh 18; Rebs: McDowell-White, McVeigh 6 Asts: McDowell-White, Wilson 5		Pts: Flaccadori 23; Rebs: Severini 14; Asts: Della Rosa 5

Heraklion Indoor Sports Arena, Heraklion
Attendance: 180
Referees: Antonio Conde (ESP), Julio Anaya (PAN), José Fernandez (CRC)

28 June 2015
15:30

Boxscore

Tunisia	36–93	Canada
Scoring by quarter: 9–21, 2–33, 10–20, 15–19
Pts: Bhouri, Rassil 8 Rebs: Rassil 4 Asts: Dhif 4		Pts: Poyser 22; Rebs: Kigab 9 Asts: Cohee 7

Heraklion University Sports Hall, Heraklion
Referees: Elias Koromilas (GRE), Hatim Al-Harbi (KSA), Piotr Pastusiak (POL)

30 June 2015
18:15

Boxscore

Canada	78–54	Italy
Scoring by quarter: 19–19, 16–11, 23–11, 20–13
Pts: Jackson 16; Rebs: Egi 8 Asts: Cohee 4		Pts: Flaccadori 13; Rebs: Severini 8 Asts: Della Rosa 4

Heraklion University Sports Hall, Heraklion
Attendance: 110
Referees: Damir Javor (SLO), Julio Anaya (PAN), Petar Obradović (BIH)

30 June 2015
18:15

Boxscore

Tunisia	64–93	Australia
Scoring by quarter: 16–24, 19–29, 13–23, 16–17
Pts: Dhif 20; Rebs: Dhif 6 Asts: Methnani 5		Pts: White 18; Rebs: four players 6 Asts: McDowell-White 6

Heraklion Indoor Sports Arena, Heraklion
Referees: Antonio Conde (ESP), Samir Abaakil (MAR), Aleksandar Glišić (SRB)

=== Group D ===
Pos	Team	Pld	W	L	PF	PA	PD	Pts
1	Greece	3	3	0	222	180	+42	6
2	Serbia	3	2	1	255	229	+26	5
3	Dominican Republic	3	1	2	244	241	+3	4
4	South Korea	3	0	3	227	298	−71	3

Source: FIBA.com

27 June 2015
18:15

Boxscore

Dominican Republic	77–82	Serbia
Scoring by quarter: 19–17, 21–25, 18–19, 19–21
Pts: Feliz 26; Rebs: Rodríguez 7 Asts: Matos 4		Pts: Peno 13; Rebs: I. Đoković, Marinković 6 Asts: I. Đoković 8

Heraklion University Sports Hall, Heraklion
Referees: Antonio Conde (ESP), Samir Abaakil (MAR), Julio Anaya (PAN)

27 June 2015
20:30

Boxscore

South Korea	55–83	Greece
Scoring by quarter: 16–19, 12–17, 13–20, 14–27
Pts: Jeon Hyun-woo 20; Rebs: Song Kyo-chang 10; Asts: Yoo Hyeon-jun 8		Pts: Papagiannis 16; Rebs: Papagiannis 16; Asts: Tsalmpouris 5

Heraklion Indoor Sports Arena, Heraklion
Referees: Petar Obradović (BIH), Piotr Pastusiak (POL), David Romano (ISR)

28 June 2015
17:45

Boxscore

Serbia	113–83	South Korea
Scoring by quarter: 24–22, 30–18, 31–26, 28–17
Pts: Simanić 23; Rebs: Lazarević, Simanić 6 Asts: I. Đoković 10		Pts: Jeon Hyun-woo 31; Rebs: Lee Youn-su 8 Asts: Kwon Hyeok-joon 7

Heraklion University Sports Hall, Heraklion
Attendance: 85
Referees: Ferdinand Pascual (PHI), Timothy Brown (NZL), David Romano (ISR)

28 June 2015
20:30

Boxscore

Greece	70–65	Dominican Republic
Scoring by quarter: 22–21, 12–15, 20–12, 16–17
Pts: Stamatis 17; Rebs: Papagiannis 13; Asts: Mitoglou 4		Pts: Rodríguez 15; Rebs: Pérez 8 Asts: Feliz 5

Heraklion Indoor Sports Arena, Heraklion
Attendance: 2,450
Referees: Damir Javor (SLO), Carlos Júlio (ANG), Fabricio Vito (ARG)

30 June 2015
20:30

Boxscore

Dominican Republic	102–89	South Korea
Scoring by quarter: 27–22, 21–24, 25–21, 29–22
Pts: Feliz, Flores 19; Rebs: Feliz 9 Asts: Feliz 6		Pts: Jeon Hyun-woo 19; Rebs: Song Kyo-chang 8 Asts: Song Kyo-chang, Yoo Hyeon-jun 8

Heraklion University Sports Hall, Heraklion
Attendance: 80
Referees: Fabricio Vito (ARG), José Fernandez (CRC), David Romano (ISR)

30 June 2015
20:30

Boxscore

Greece	69–60	Serbia
Scoring by quarter: 15–20, 18–17, 13–10, 23–13
Pts: Toliopoulos 11; Rebs: Mitoglou 8 Asts: Toliopoulos 4		Pts: R. Đoković 14; Rebs: Vučetić 7 Asts: R. Đoković 4

Heraklion Indoor Sports Arena, Heraklion
Attendance: 4,300
Referees: Roberto Vázquez (PUR), Ferdinand Pascual (PHI), Thomas Short (USA)

== Knockout stage ==
=== Bracket ===
Round of 16
1 July
United States	93
Argentina	45
1 July
Italy	82
Dominican Republic	73
1 July
Spain	67
Egypt	60
1 July
Greece	100
Tunisia	48
1 July
Croatia	75
China	68
1 July
Canada	100
South Korea	64
1 July
Turkey	73
Iran	63
1 July
Serbia	56
Australia	69

Quarterfinals
3 July
United States	86
Italy	65
3 July
Spain	59
Greece	70
3 July
Croatia	84
Canada	71
3 July
Turkey	81
Australia	70

Semifinals
4 July
United States	82
Greece	76
4 July
Croatia	91
Turkey	56

Final
5 July
United States (OT)	79
Croatia	71
Third place
5 July
Greece	71
Turkey	80

5–8th place bracket

5–8th place semifinals
4 July
Italy (OT)	83
Spain	77
4 July
Canada	66
Australia	58

Fifth place
5 July
Italy	44
Canada	77
Seventh place
5 July
Spain	72
Australia	103

9–12th place bracket

9–16th place quarterfinals
3 July
Argentina	71
Dominican Republic	66
3 July
Egypt	81
Tunisia	68
3 July
China	54
South Korea	77
3 July
Iran	70
Serbia	83

9–12th place semifinals
4 July
Argentina	74
Egypt	64
4 July
South Korea	109
Serbia (OT)	113

Ninth place
5 July
Argentina	76
Serbia	77
Eleventh place
5 July
Egypt	101
South Korea	88

13–16th place bracket

13–16th place semifinals
4 July
Dominican Republic	78
Tunisia	59
4 July
China	59
Iran	64

13th place
5 July
Dominican Republic	71
Iran	50
15th place
5 July
Tunisia	68
China	80

All times are local (UTC+3).

=== Round of 16 ===
1 July 2015
13:15

Boxscore

Egypt	60–67	Spain
Scoring by quarter: 19–15, 10–21, 8–20, 23–11
Pts: T. Mohamed 17; Rebs: Khalaf, I. Mohamed 7 Asts: M. Mohamed 4		Pts: M. García 21; Rebs: Díaz, Rodríguez 6 Asts: Oroz 4

Heraklion University Sports Hall, Heraklion
Attendance: 60
Referees: Petar Obradović (BIH), José Fernández (CRC), Rabah Noujaim (LIB)

1 July 2015
13:45

Boxscore

Iran	63–73	Turkey
Scoring by quarter: 21–13, 8–20, 17–14, 17–26
Pts: Rezaeifar 14; Rebs: Yousefvand 10; Asts: Allahverdi 5		Pts: Ulubay 16; Rebs: Arar 7 Asts: Geçim 6

Heraklion Indoor Sports Arena, Heraklion
Attendance: 100
Referees: Thomas Short (USA), Carlos Júlio (ANG), Ilya Putenko (RUS)

1 July 2015
15:30

Boxscore

Italy	82–73	Dominican Republic
Scoring by quarter: 18–17, 21–7, 28–27, 15–22
Pts: Severini 21; Rebs: Severini 7 Asts: Flaccadori 8		Pts: Feliz 28; Rebs: Araujo 13; Asts: Flores 4

Heraklion University Sports Hall, Heraklion
Attendance: 90
Referees: Roberto Vázquez (PUR), Antonio Conde (ESP), Ferdinand Pascual (PHI)

1 July 2015
16:00

Boxscore

Croatia	75–68	China
Scoring by quarter: 21–16, 21–14, 16–22, 17–16
Pts: Zubac 23; Rebs: Arapović 11; Asts: Slavica 7		Pts: Sun Minghui 15; Rebs: Fu Hao 12; Asts: Zhao Rui 8

Heraklion Indoor Sports Arena, Heraklion
Attendance: 120
Referees: Fabricio Vito (ARG), Timothy Brown (NZL), David Romano (ISR)

1 July 2015
17:45

Boxscore

Canada	100–64	South Korea
Scoring by quarter: 27–28 , 21–12, 24–6, 28–18
Pts: Jackson 20; Rebs: Brooks 9 Asts: Brooks 9		Pts: Kim Kyung-won 14; Rebs: Kim Kyung-won 7 Asts: Yoo Hyeon-jun 5

Heraklion University Sports Hall, Heraklion
Referees: Damir Javor (SLO), Hatim Al-Harbi (KSA), Aleksandar Glišić (SRB)

1 July 2015
18:15

Boxscore

United States	93–45	Argentina
Scoring by quarter: 26–12, 23–8, 23–11, 21–14
Pts: Giles 17; Rebs: Giles 12; Asts: Brunson 6		Pts: Zurbriggen 13; Rebs: Zurbriggen 6 Asts: Vildoza 3

Heraklion Indoor Sports Arena, Heraklion
Attendance: 500
Referees: Elias Koromilas (GRE), Samir Abaakil (MAR), Jean-Charles Collin (FRA)

1 July 2015
20:00

Boxscore

Australia	69–56	Serbia
Scoring by quarter: 21–18, 21–9, 18–17, 9–12
Pts: McVeigh 18; Rebs: McVeigh 12; Asts: McVeigh, Wilson 2		Pts: Stojanović 15; Rebs: Stojanović 10; Asts: Ostojić 3

Heraklion University Sports Hall, Heraklion
Attendance: 150
Referees: Guilherme Locetelli (BRA), Piotr Pastusiak (POL), Borys Shulga (UKR)

1 July 2015
20:30

Boxscore

Tunisia	48–100	Greece
Scoring by quarter: 11–21, 11–38, 15–25, 11–16
Pts: Gannouni 10; Rebs: Aouichi 5 Asts: Dhif 4		Pts: Dorsey 25; Rebs: Papagiannis 9 Asts: Toliopoulos 9

Heraklion Indoor Sports Arena, Heraklion
Attendance: 2,775
Referees: Michael Weiland (CAN), Julio Anaya (PAN), Américo Rodriguez (VEN)

=== 9–16th place quarterfinals ===
3 July 2015
11:00

Boxscore

Argentina	71–66	Dominican Republic
Scoring by quarter: 19–8, 21–15, 10–24, 21–19
Pts: Fjellerup 12; Rebs: Gerhardt 7 Asts: Gerhardt 6		Pts: Nuñez 16; Rebs: Montero, Rodríguez 8 Asts: Matos 6

Heraklion University Sports Hall, Heraklion
Referees: Petar Obradović (BIH), Timothy Brown (NZL), David Romano (ISR)

3 July 2015
13:15

Boxscore

China	54–77	South Korea
Scoring by quarter: 20–18, 4–29, 11–16, 19–14
Pts: Shao Yinglun 11; Rebs: Shao Yinglun, Zhao Yanhao 8 Asts: Sun Minghui 4		Pts: Kim Kyung-won 26; Rebs: Kim Kyung-won 8 Asts: Yoo Hyeon-jun 8

Heraklion University Sports Hall, Heraklion
Attendance: 55
Referees: Antonio Conde (ESP), Samir Abaakil (MAR), José Fernandez (CRC)

3 July 2015
15:30

Boxscore

Egypt	81–68	Tunisia
Scoring by quarter: 23–20, 17–20, 26–10, 15–18
Pts: Khalaf, M. Mohamed 17; Rebs: Khalaf 17; Asts: Mahran 9		Pts: Gannouni 21; Rebs: Methnani 8 Asts: Jawadi 4

Heraklion University Sports Hall, Heraklion
Attendance: 50
Referees: Borys Shulga (UKR), Hatim Al-Harbi (KSA), Carlos Júlio (ANG)

3 July 2015
17:45

Boxscore

Iran	70–83	Serbia
Scoring by quarter: 13–18, 20–21, 18–20, 19–24
Pts: Yousefvand 24; Rebs: Yousefvand 12; Asts: Allahverdi, Yousefvand 5		Pts: Glišić 16; Rebs: Glišić 8 Asts: I. Đoković 5

Heraklion University Sports Hall, Heraklion
Attendance: 65
Referees: Roberto Vázquez (PUR), Rabah Noujaim (LIB), Ilya Putenko (RUS)

=== Quarterfinals ===
3 July 2015
13:45

Boxscore

Turkey	81–70	Australia
Scoring by quarter: 19–15, 12–17, 24–13, 26–25
Pts: Uğurlu 16; Rebs: Güven 11; Asts: Geçim 10		Pts: McVeigh 14; Rebs: Clark, Gak 5 Asts: three players 3

Heraklion Indoor Sports Arena, Heraklion
Referees: Ferdinand Pascual (PHI), Piotr Pastusiak (POL), Thomas Short (USA)

3 July 2015
16:00

Boxscore

Croatia	84–71	Canada
Scoring by quarter: 23–21, 25–18, 11–15, 25–17
Pts: Božić, Arapović 20; Rebs: Arapović 11; Asts: Arapović, Kapusta 6		Pts: Jackson 20; Rebs: Egi 7 Asts: Brooks, Egi 4

Heraklion Indoor Sports Arena, Heraklion
Referees: Elias Koromilas (GRE), Julio Anaya (PAN), Jean-Charles Collin (FRA)

3 July 2015
18:15

Boxscore

United States	86–65	Italy
Scoring by quarter: 27–20, 26–15, 18–19, 15–11
Pts: Brunson 17; Rebs: Swanigan 12; Asts: Brunson 5		Pts: Flaccadori 21; Rebs: Lupusor 4 Asts: Flaccadori 6

Heraklion Indoor Sports Arena, Heraklion
Attendance: 2,100
Referees: Guilherme Locetelli (BRA), Aleksandar Glišić (SRB), Fabricio Vito (ARG)

3 July 2015
20:30

Boxscore

Spain	59–70	Greece
Scoring by quarter: 14–12, 12–14, 15–25, 18–19
Pts: Sima 22; Rebs: Vilá 8 Asts: Alonso 6		Pts: Charalampopoulos, Dorsey 14; Rebs: Mitoglou 11; Asts: Toliopoulos 6

Heraklion Indoor Sports Arena, Heraklion
Attendance: 5,200
Referees: Damir Javor (SLO), Américo Rodriguez (VEN), Michael Weiland (CAN)

=== 13–16th place semifinals ===
4 July 2015
11:00

Boxscore

Dominican Republic	78–59	Tunisia
Scoring by quarter: 18–9, 16–17, 19–18, 25–15
Pts: Araujo 18; Rebs: Araujo 10; Asts: Valera 7		Pts: Guebellaoui 12; Rebs: Guebellaoui 7 Asts: Bhouri 3

Heraklion University Sports Hall, Heraklion
Attendance: 50
Referees: Aleksandar Glišić (SRB), Rabah Noujaim (LIB), Ilya Putenko (RUS)

4 July 2015
13:15

Boxscore

China	59–64	Iran
Scoring by quarter: 12–12, 16–15, 16–16, 15–21
Pts: Hu Jinqiu, Zhao Yanhao 16; Rebs: Hu Jinqiu 9 Asts: Sun Minghui 9		Pts: Allahverdi 20; Rebs: Yousefvand 15; Asts: Sheikhi, Yousefvand 3

Heraklion University Sports Hall, Heraklion
Attendance: 48
Referees: Fabricio Vito (ARG), Hatim Al-Harbi (KSA), Carlos Júlio (ANG)

=== 9–12th place semifinals ===
4 July 2015
15:30

Boxscore

Argentina	74–64	Egypt
Scoring by quarter: 16–18, 23–16, 19–17, 16–13
Pts: Gerhardt 16; Rebs: Delfino 10; Asts: Fjellerup 5		Pts: T. Mohamed 18; Rebs: T. Mohamed 8 Asts: M. Mohamed 4

Heraklion University Sports Hall, Heraklion
Attendance: 61
Referees: Borys Shulga (UKR), Samir Abaakil (MAR), Julio Anaya (PAN)

4 July 2015
17:45

Boxscore

South Korea	109–113 (OT)	Serbia
Scoring by quarter: 26–27, 25–25, 22–21, 22–22, Overtime: 14–18
Pts: Song Kyo-chang 40; Rebs: Song Kyo-chang 6 Asts: Kwon Hyeok-joon 7		Pts: Glišić, Simanić 17; Rebs: Glišić 12; Asts: I. Đoković, Stojanović 6

Heraklion University Sports Hall, Heraklion
Attendance: 65
Referees: Guilherme Locetelli (BRA), Jean-Charles Collin (FRA), David Romano (ISR)

=== 5–8th place semifinals ===
4 July 2015
13:45

Boxscore

Canada	66–58	Australia
Scoring by quarter: 12–17, 18–14, 20–10, 16–17
Pts: Brooks 19; Rebs: Brooks 11; Asts: Henry, Provo 2		Pts: Vasiljevic 25; Rebs: Vasiljevic 6 Asts: McDowell-White 5

Heraklion Indoor Sports Arena, Heraklion
Attendance: 80
Referees: Thomas Short (USA), José Fernández (CRC), Petar Obradović (BIH)

4 July 2015
16:00

Boxscore

Italy	83–77 (OT)	Spain
Scoring by quarter: 13–25, 16–24, 11–15, 29–5, Overtime: 14–8
Pts: Flaccadori 25; Rebs: Severini 10; Asts: Della Rosa, Flaccadori 8		Pts: M. García, López-Arostegui 16; Rebs: López-Arostegui 9 Asts: Pérez 7

Heraklion Indoor Sports Arena, Heraklion
Attendance: 180
Referees: Elias Koromilas (GRE), Timothy Brown (NZL), Américo Rodriguez (VEN)

=== Semifinals ===
4 July 2015
18:15

Boxscore

Croatia	91–56	Turkey
Scoring by quarter: 22–12, 22–16, 27–17, 20–11
Pts: Arapović 25; Rebs: Arapović 15; Asts: Arapović 6		Pts: Güven 12; Rebs: Arar, Güven 4 Asts: Bayram, Geçim 3

Heraklion Indoor Sports Arena, Heraklion
Attendance: 3,000
Referees: Michael Weiland (CAN), Piotr Pastusiak (POL), Roberto Vázquez (PUR)

4 July 2015
20:30

Boxscore

United States	82–76	Greece
Scoring by quarter: 17–12, 20–20, 20–21, 25–23
Pts: Brunson 30; Rebs: Giles 11; Asts: Brunson 4		Pts: Dorsey 23; Rebs: Charalampopoulos 7 Asts: Toliopoulos 4

Heraklion Indoor Sports Arena, Heraklion
Attendance: 5,200
Referees: Damir Javor (SLO), Antonio Conde (ESP), Ferdinand Pascual (PHI)

=== 15th place game ===
5 July 2015
09:45

Boxscore

Tunisia	68–80	China
Scoring by quarter: 20–21, 16–19, 14–23, 18–17
Pts: Gannouni 17; Rebs: Saidani 9 Asts: Dhif, Gannouni 3		Pts: Zhao Rui 25; Rebs: Zeng Fanri 11; Asts: Zhao Rui 8

Heraklion University Sports Hall, Heraklion
Attendance: 25
Referees: Jean-Charles Collin (FRA), Samir Abaakil (MAR), Ilya Putenko (RUS)

=== 13th place game ===
5 July 2015
12:00

Boxscore

Dominican Republic	71–50	Iran
Scoring by quarter: 16–11, 22–16, 13–18, 20–5
Pts: Feliz 22; Rebs: Rodríguez 8 Asts: Rodríguez 6		Pts: Rezaeifar 19; Rebs: Yousefvand 21; Asts: Allahverdi 5

Heraklion University Sports Hall, Heraklion
Attendance: 35
Referees: Petar Obradović (BIH), Aleksandar Glišić (SRB), Piotr Pastusiak (POL)

=== Eleventh place game ===
5 July 2015
14:15

Boxscore

Egypt	101–88	South Korea
Scoring by quarter: 28–17, 21–19, 26–29, 26–23
Pts: T. Mohamed 27; Rebs: Khalaf 11; Asts: M. Mohamed, T. Mohamed 4		Pts: Kim Kyung-won 24; Rebs: Kim Kyung-won 10; Asts: Yoo Hyeon-jun 8

Heraklion University Sports Hall, Heraklion
Referees: Fabricio Vito (ARG), Hatim Al-Harbi (KSA), Rabah Noujaim (LIB)

=== Ninth place game ===
5 July 2015
16:30

Boxscore

Argentina	76–77	Serbia
Scoring by quarter: 20–14, 11–24, 22–21, 23–18
Pts: Fernández 29; Rebs: Fernández 6 Asts: Gerhardt 6		Pts: Stojanović 18; Rebs: Stojanović 8 Asts: Peno 5

Heraklion University Sports Hall, Heraklion
Attendance: 60
Referees: Thomas Short (USA), Carlos Júlio (ANG), David Romano (ISR)

=== Seventh place game ===
5 July 2015
13:45

Boxscore

Spain	72–103	Australia
Scoring by quarter: 12–21, 13–22, 28–23, 19–37
Pts: López-Arostegui 17; Rebs: Vilá 8 Asts: Alonso 4		Pts: Krebs 31; Rebs: McVeigh, White 7 Asts: McDowell-White 7

Heraklion Indoor Sports Arena, Heraklion
Attendance: 80
Referees: Ferdinand Pascual (PHI), José Fernandez (CRC), Borys Shulga (UKR)

=== Fifth place game ===
5 July 2015
16:00

Boxscore

Italy	44–77	Canada
Scoring by quarter: 9–25, 12–18, 13–16, 10–18
Pts: Mastellari 13; Rebs: Flaccadori 5 Asts: Della Rosa 3		Pts: Brooks 28; Rebs: Jackson 9 Asts: Provo 5

Heraklion Indoor Sports Arena, Heraklion
Attendance: 450
Referees: Antonio Conde (ESP), Julio Anaya (PAN), Timothy Brown (NZL)

=== Bronze medal match ===
5 July 2015
18:15

Boxscore

Greece	71–80	Turkey
Scoring by quarter: 16–16, 15–20, 13–20, 27–24
Pts: Dorsey 19; Rebs: Kottas 8 Asts: Stamatis 3		Pts: Korkmaz 28; Rebs: Korkmaz 8 Asts: Geçim 6

Heraklion Indoor Sports Arena, Heraklion
Referees: Roberto Vázquez (PUR), Guilherme Locatellu (BRA), Américo Rodriguez (VEN)

=== Final ===
5 July 2015
20:30

Boxscore

United States	79–71 (OT)	Croatia
Scoring by quarter: 14–13, 20–18, 16–16, 17–20, Overtime: 12–4
Pts: Brunson 14; Rebs: Giles 16; Asts: Brunson 7		Pts: Slavica 23; Rebs: Zubac 13; Asts: Slavica 6

Heraklion Indoor Sports Arena, Heraklion
Attendance: 2,450
Referees: Damir Javor (SLO), Elias Koromilas (GRE), Michael Weiland (CAN)

== Final standings ==
Rank	Team
1st place, gold medalist(s)	United States
2nd place, silver medalist(s)	Croatia
3rd place, bronze medalist(s)	Turkey
4th	Greece
5th	Canada
6th	Italy
7th	Australia
8th	Spain
9th	Serbia
10th	Argentina
11th	Egypt
12th	South Korea
13th	Dominican Republic
14th	Iran
15th	China
16th	Tunisia

== Statistics and awards ==
=== Statistical leaders ===
Points

Name	PPG
(Dominican Republic) Andrés Feliz	18.9
(Canada) Dillon Brooks	18.8
(Italy) Diego Flaccadori	17.6
(Croatia) Ivica Zubac	17.6
(South Korea) Song Kyo-chang	16.5

Rebounds

Name	RPG
(Iran) Mohammad Yousefvand	13.9
(United States) Harry Giles	10.6
(Croatia) Marko Arapović	10.3
(China) Hu Jinqiu	9.3
(Egypt) Ahmed Khalaf	8.4

Assists

Name	APG
(South Korea) Yoo Hyeon-jun	6.4
(Turkey) Tolga Geçim	6.3
(United States) Jalen Brunson	5.6
(Serbia) Ilija Đoković	5.1
(Italy) Diego Flaccadori	4.9
(Croatia) Borna Kapusta	4.9

Blocks

Name	BPG
(Egypt) Ahmed Khalaf	2.9
(Greece) Georgios Papagiannis	2.6
(Italy) Luca Severini	2.0
(Spain) Yankuba Sima	2.0
(United States) Chinanu Onuaku	1.7

Steals

Name	SPG
(China) Zhao Yanhao	3.3
(Iran) Mohammad Yousefvand	2.7
(Egypt) Mohamed Ibrahim Mohamed	2.4
(United States) Jalen Brunson	2.1
(Italy) Diego Flaccadori	2.1
(Argentina) Ivan Gramajo	2.1
(Turkey) Furkan Korkmaz	2.1
(Australia) William McDowell-White	2.1

=== Awards ===
2015 Under-19 World Championship winner

United States
Sixth title

Most Valuable Player
(United States) Jalen Brunson

All-Tournament Team

- (United States) Jalen Brunson
- (Greece) Tyler Dorsey
- (Turkey) Furkan Korkmaz
- (United States) Harry Giles
- (Croatia) Marko Arapović
