= Andrés Feliz =

Dominican basketball player (born 1997)

- Feliz with Real Madrid in 2026

No. 24 – Real Madrid
- Position: Point guard
- League: Liga ACB; EuroLeague

Personal information
- Born: July 15, 1997 (age 29) Santo Domingo, Dominican Republic
- Listed height: 1.88 m (6 ft 2 in)
- Listed weight: 92 kg (203 lb)

Career information
- High school: West Oaks Academy (Orlando, Florida)
- College: Northwest Florida State (2016–2018); Illinois (2018–2020)
- NBA draft: 2020: undrafted
- Playing career: 2020–present

Career history
- 2021: CB Prat
- 2021–2024: Joventut Badalona
- 2024–present: Real Madrid

Career highlights
- All-EuroCup Second Team (2024); EuroLeague SuperCup champion (2026); Liga ACB champion (2025); All-Liga ACB First Team (2024); First-team NJCAA DI All-American (2018); Nike Hoop Summit (2016)
Medals
Men's basketball
Representing the Dominican Republic
Centrobasket U17 Championship
Gold medal – first place	2013 Puerto Rico	Team
FIBA Americas U18 Championship
Bronze medal – third place	2014 Colorado Springs	Team
Central American and Caribbean Games
Gold medal – first place	2023 San Salvador	Team

Andrés Rafael Feliz Sarita (born July 7, 1997) is a Dominican professional basketball player for Real Madrid of the Liga ACB and the EuroLeague. He played college basketball for the Northwest Florida State Raiders and the Illinois Fighting Illini. He has represented the Dominican Republic in FIBA-sanctioned international youth and senior level competitions and was the top scorer at the 2015 FIBA Under-19 World Championship.

== Early life ==
Feliz grew up in Guachupita, one of the poorest and most dangerous areas of Santo Domingo in the Dominican Republic. His neighborhood received limited access to water and electricity. Because his family could not afford basketball shoes, he played in his school shoes or borrowed them from a friend.

== High school career ==
While at West Oaks Academy in Orlando, Florida, Feliz helped lead his varsity basketball team to consecutive Sunshine Independent Athletic Association state titles and was a two-time tournament MVP. During his junior season, he was teammates with Corey Sanders. As a high school senior, Feliz was named to the World Team in the 2016 Nike Hoop Summit that took place at the Moda Center in Portland, Oregon.

During the summer of 2015, Feliz verbally committed to play for then head coach Orlando Antigua and the South Florida Bulls. He received interest from Louisville, Miami, and Missouri during his recruitment.

College recruiting
Name	Hometown	School	Height	Weight	Commit date
Andrés Feliz; PG	Santo Domingo, Dominican Republic	West Oaks Academy (FL)	6 ft 0 in (1.83 m)	165 lb (75 kg)	Oct 13, 2015
Andrés Feliz; PG	Recruit ratings: No ratings found				
Overall recruit ranking:
Note: In many cases, Scout, Rivals, 247Sports, On3, and ESPN may conflict in their listings of height and weight.; In these cases, the average was taken. ESPN grades are on a 100-point scale.; Sources: "2016 Team Ranking". Rivals.

== College career ==
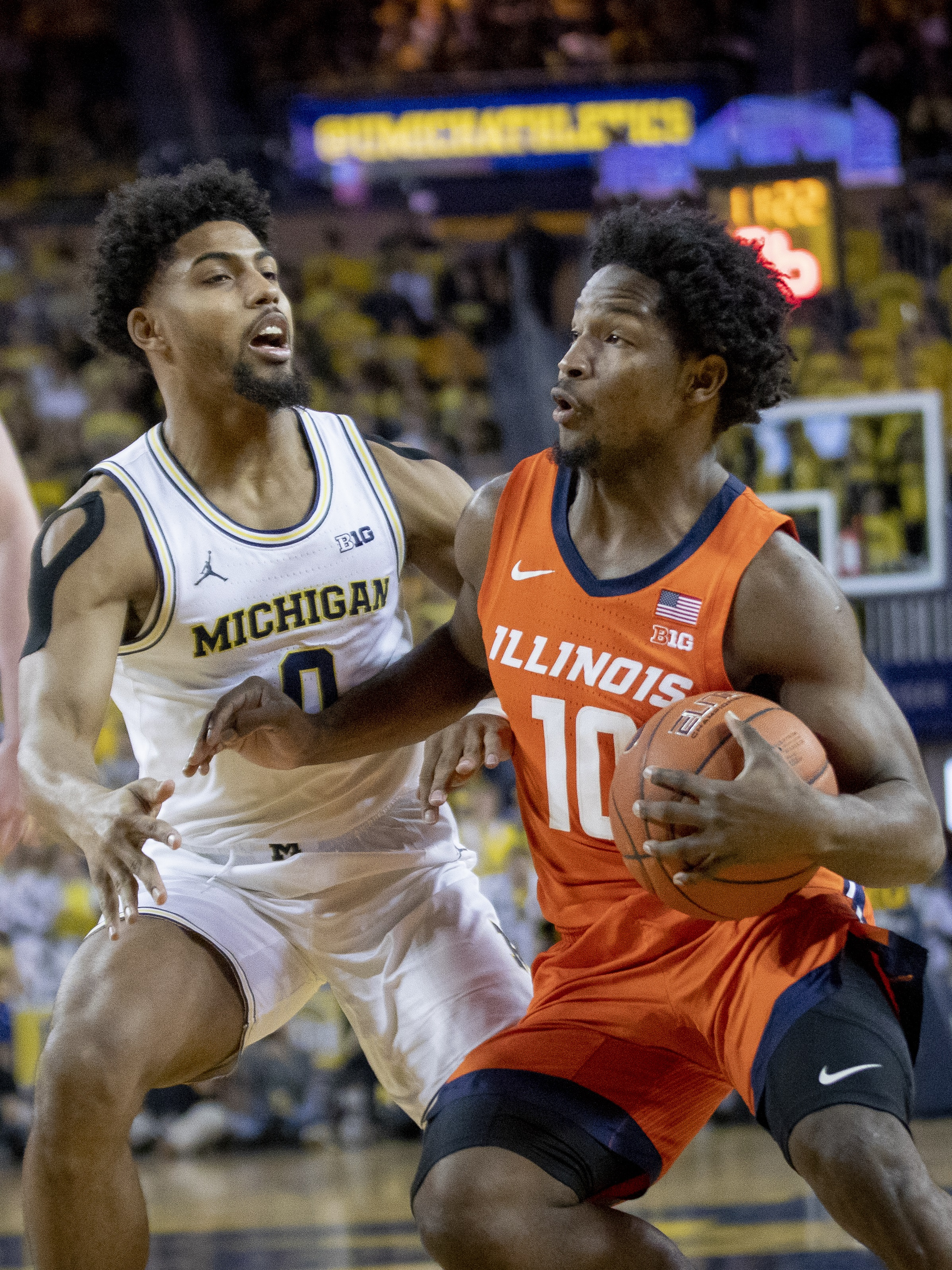
Feliz (right) in January 2020

As a freshman at the University of South Florida, Feliz left school a few days into the semester and immediately enrolled at Northwest Florida State College in Niceville, Florida. As a freshman at Northwest Florida, Feliz averaged 11.6 points per game, 4.7 assists per game, and 3.2 rebounds per game while averaging 57.3 percent from the field. As a sophomore, Feliz led Northwest Florida to a Florida State Title an elite eight appearance in the NJCAA Men's Division I Basketball Championship while averaging 20.0 points, 6.1 assists, 5.7 rebounds and 2.1 steals per game and becoming Northwest Florida State's all-time assists leader. Feliz was named a NJCAA DI First Team All-American and to the 2018 NJCAA DI All-Tournament Team. As the top rated junior college point guard in the United States, Feliz committed to continue his college career playing for head coach Brad Underwood, his former coach Orlando Antigua, and the Illinois Fighting Illini.

As a junior, Feliz was a spark plug coming off the bench, averaging 8.3 points, 2.2 assist, and 2.9 rebounds per game and shot 45-percent from the field and 27-percent from three-point range. He averaged 11 points, 5 rebounds, and 2.9 assists per game as a senior.

Feliz joined House of 'Paign, a team composed primarily of Illinois alumni in The Basketball Tournament 2020. He scored 20 points and had seven rebounds in a 76–53 win over War Tampa in the first round.

== Professional career ==
=== Prat Juventud (2021) ===
On February 13, 2021, Feliz signed with Prat Juventud of the Primera FEB. He played in 15 games and finished the season with 18.9 points, 4.5 rebounds, and 3.3 assists per game.

=== Joventut Badalona (2021–2024) ===
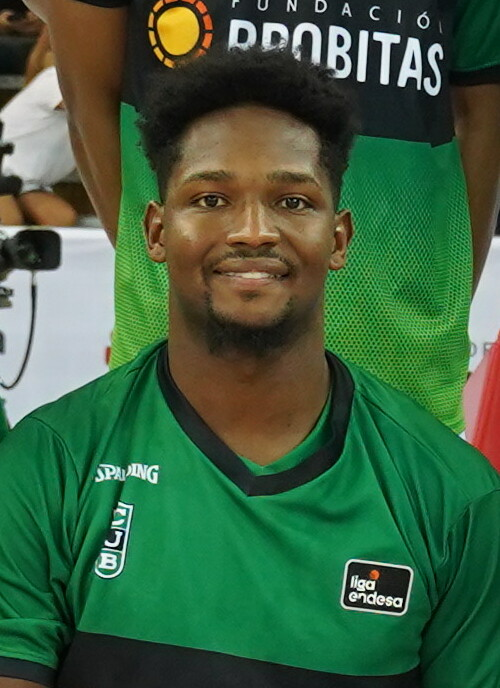
Feliz as a member of Joventut Badalona in 2022–23

On July 13, 2021, Feliz signed a two-year contract with Joventut Badalona of the Spanish Liga ACB.

In June 2022, Feliz extended his contract with the team until June 2025.

In February 2024, Feliz reached an agreement with the team to extend his contract until June 2026.

In March 2024, Feliz was named the best player in Round 16 of the Eurocup basketball for his performance in the match in which his team won 79–88 against Ratiopharm Ulm. This was the first MVP award for Feliz who scored a career-high of 28 points.

In June 2024, Feliz received the award for the best international player in the Spanish league during the 5th Spanish Basketball gala.

On July 3, 2024, the team exercised a release clause on Feliz.

=== Real Madrid (2024–present) ===
In July 2024, Feliz signed with Real Madrid of the Liga ACB and the EuroLeague. He had originally signed with a contract extension with his previous club until 2026, but it included a termination clause of 500,000 euros. He joined the team as a European citizen as he has a Cotonou passport. He signed a contract until 2027.

In October 2024, Feliz was sidelined with a foot injury. Following tests, he was diagnosed with a rupture of the plantar fascia in his right foot.

In May 2026 Feliz played in the Euroleague final against Olympiacos. Feliz missed the potential game-tying three, and Olympiacos went on to win 92–85.

== National team career ==
Feliz made his international debut for the Dominican Republic national basketball team during the 2013 Centrobasket U17 Championship for Men. In 2014, he won a bronze medal playing for the Dominican Republic national team in the 2014 FIBA Americas Under-18 Championship. In 2015, Feliz was the leading scorer in the 2015 FIBA Under-19 World Championship, averaging 18.9 points and 3.7 assists in seven games. He also played for the Dominican Republic national team during the 2015 Pan American Games. Feliz won a gold medal with his national team at the 2023 Central American and Caribbean Games held in San Salvador, El Salvador.

== Career statistics ==
Legend
GP	Games played	GS	Games started	MPG	Minutes per game
FG%	Field goal percentage	3P%	3-point field goal percentage	FT%	Free throw percentage
RPG	Rebounds per game	APG	Assists per game	SPG	Steals per game
BPG	Blocks per game	PPG	Points per game	**Bold**	Career high

=== College ===
==== NCAA Division I ====
Year	Team	GP	GS	MPG	FG%	3P%	FT%	RPG	APG	SPG	BPG	PPG
2018–19	Illinois	**33**	5	22.3	.453	.270	.755	2.9	2.2	**1.0**	.0	8.3
2019–20	Illinois	31	**15**	**26.8**	**.460**	**.274**	**.769**	**5.0**	**2.9**	.7	.0	**11.0**
Career		64	20	24.5	.457	.273	.763	3.9	2.6	.9	.0	9.6

==== JUCO ====
Year	Team	GP	GS	MPG	FG%	3P%	FT%	RPG	APG	SPG	BPG	PPG
2016–17	Northwest Florida State	28	28	25.0	.573	.184	.702	3.2	4.7	1.5	.0	11.6
2017–18	Northwest Florida State	**34**	**33**	**31.0**	**.611**	**.418**	**.772**	**5.7**	**6.1**	**2.1**	**.1**	**20.0**
Career		62	61	28.3	.597	.349	.750	4.6	5.5	1.8	.1	16.2
