= Sergi García (basketball) =

Spanish basketball player

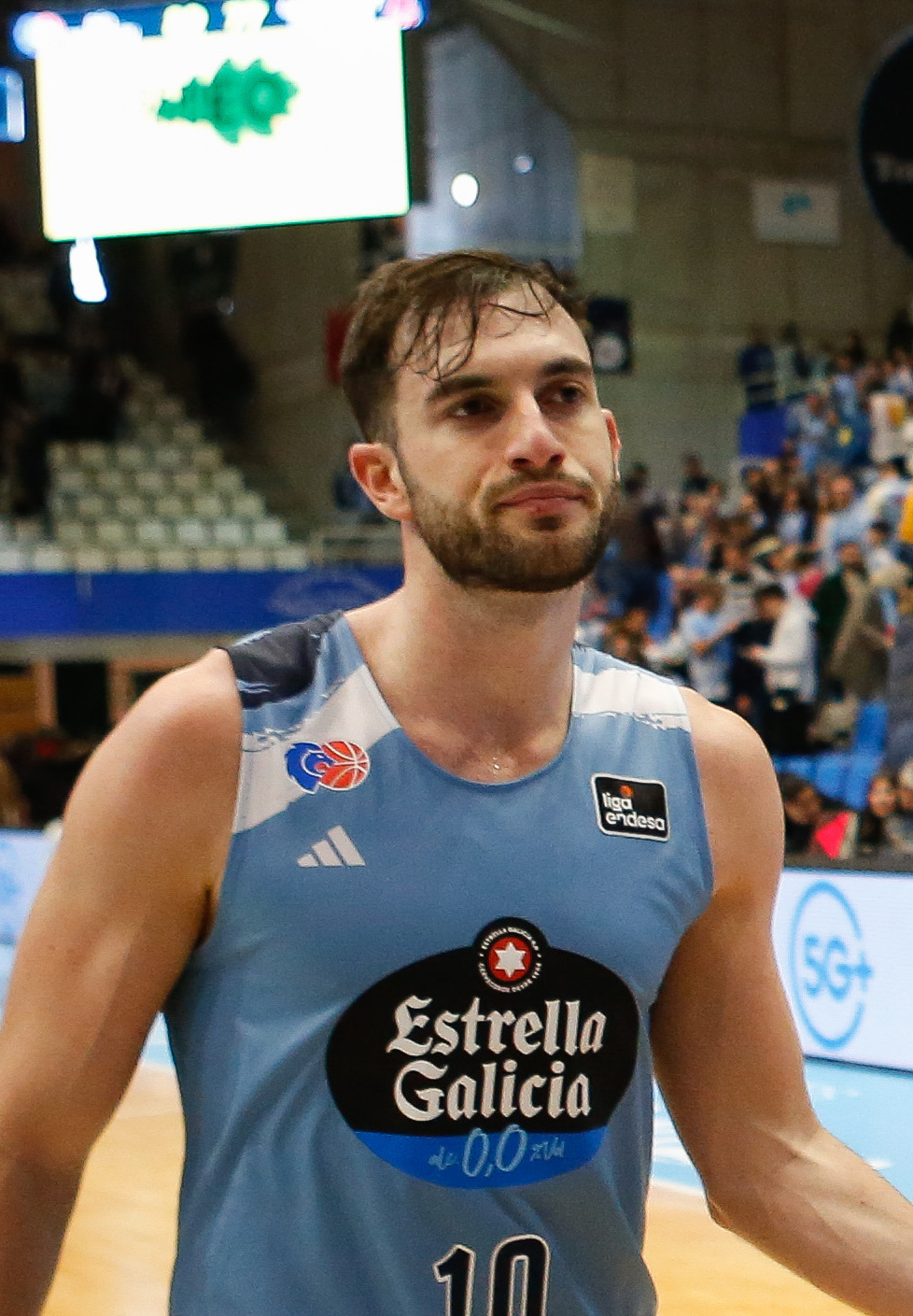
- García with Río Breogán in 2023

No. 17 – Basket Zaragoza
- Position: Point guard
- League: Liga ACB

Personal information
- Born: 17 February 1997 (age 29) Palma de Mallorca, Spain
- Listed height: 1.93 m (6 ft 4 in)
- Listed weight: 82 kg (181 lb)

Career information
- Playing career: 2013–present

Career history
- 2013–2017: CAI Zaragoza
- 2013–2016: →El Olivar
- 2017–2019: Valencia Basket
- 2019: →Rasta Vechta
- 2019–2020: Kirolbet Baskonia
- 2020–2022: Andorra
- 2022: Gran Canaria
- 2022–2024: Río Breogán
- 2024–2025: Granada
- 2025: San Pablo Burgos
- 2025–2026: Estudiantes
- 2026–present: Zaragoza

Career highlights
- EuroCup champion (2019); Liga ACB champion (2020); Spain Cup champion (2026)
Medals
Men's basketball
Representing Spain
U16 European Championship
Gold medal – first place	2013 Ukraine	Team
U20 European Championship
Gold medal – first place	2016 Finland	Team

Sergi García Calvo (born 17 February 1997) is a Spanish professional basketball player for Casademont Zaragoza of the Spanish Liga ACB.

== Professional career ==
A product of Centre de Tecnificació Esportiva Illes Balears, García moved to CAI Zaragoza of the Spanish top flight Liga ACB in 2013. Until 2016, he also saw action for Zaragoza’s affiliate El Olivar.

In 2013, García was named Most Valuable Player of the Jordan Brand Classic Camp in Barcelona.

During the 2017–18 ACB season, Valencia Basket paid off García's contract's rescission clause and subsequently signed him under a four-year contract, including the ongoing season. On 24 July 2019 Valencia Basket loaned him to Rasta Vechta for the 2019–20 season. However, on 5 December 2019 he terminated his contract for signing with EuroLeague team Baskonia. Garcia signed with MoraBanc Andorra of the Liga ACB on 20 July 2020.

On 14 December 2021 Garcia signed a two-month contract with Gran Canaria of the Liga ACB. Gran Canaria announced on 18 February 2022 that they do not extent the contract.

On 10 June 2022 he signed with Río Breogán of the Spanish Liga ACB.

On July 3, 2024, he signed with Covirán Granada of the Liga ACB.

On October 2, 2025, he signed a 2-months contract with San Pablo Burgos of the Spanish Liga ACB.

After a season with Estudiantes in Primera FEB, García returned to Zaragoza of the Liga ACB on July 5, 2026.

=== National team ===
He represented the Spanish national under-16 team at the 2012 and 2013 European Championships, winning the gold medal at the second one. In 2014, he helped the under-17 squad to reach the semifinals at the World Championships.

In 2015, García attended to the under-18 European Championships as well as the under-19 World Championships. He was also a member of the under-20 gold-winning squad at the under-20 European Championship.

In November 2017, García was called up with the national team for playing the two first matches of the 2019 World Cup qualifiers. After not playing the first match, he made his debut in Burgos at the win against Slovenia by 92–84.
