= Heraklion University Sports Hall =

Indoor arena in Heraklion, Crete, Greece

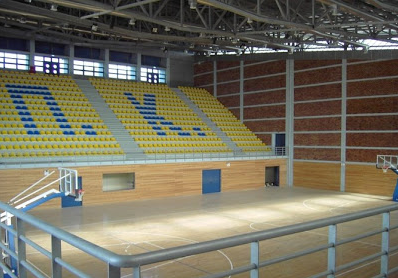
- Interior view of the sports hall
- Interactive map of Heraklion University Sports Hall
- Full name: Heraklion University Sports Hall
- Location: Heraklion, Crete, Greece
- Coordinates: 35.30748°N 25.07845°E
- Owner: Greek Ministry of Culture, General Secretariat of Sports
- Capacity: Concerts: 2,000; Basketball: 1,080
- Surface: Parquet

Construction
- Groundbreaking: 2001
- Opened: 2004

Heraklion University Sports Hall (Greek: Κλειστό Γήπεδο Πανεπιστημίου Ηρακλείου), is a small multi-purpose indoor arena that is located in the city of Heraklion, on the island of Crete, in Greece. It is located near the University of Crete. The indoor hall can be used to host several different events, with its primary use being to host basketball games, concerts, and the graduation ceremonies of the university. The arena's seating capacity for basketball games is 1,080 people.

== History ==
Despite its small size, Heraklion University Sports Hall has been used as venue in several major FIBA international youth basketball tournaments. It hosted the FIBA Under-20 European Championship twice, hosting the 2014 tournament and the 2017 tournament. It also hosted the FIBA Under-19 World Cup twice, hosting the 2015 tournament and the 2019 tournament.

== Major events hosted ==
- 2014 FIBA Under-20 European Championship
- 2015 FIBA Under-19 World Cup
- 2017 FIBA Under-20 European Championship
- 2019 FIBA Under-19 World Cup
