= Chania Kladissos Indoor Hall =

Sports arena on the island of Crete, Greece

Chania Indoor Hall
- Interactive map of Chania Indoor Hall
- Full name: Chania Kladissos Indoor Hall
- Location: Chania, Crete, Greece
- Owner: Municipality of Chania
- Capacity: Basketball: 2,400 (permanent upper tier seating); 3,000 (with retractable lower tier seating)
- Surface: Parquet

Construction
- Groundbreaking: 2002
- Opened: 2005
- Cost: €4.4 million (in 2005 €)

Chania Kladissos Indoor Hall (alternate spellings: Hania, Kladisos) (Greek: Κλειστό Κλαδισού Χανίων) is a multi-purpose indoor sports arena that is located in Chania, on the island of Crete, Greece. The arena is mainly used to host basketball, volleyball, and handball games. The arena has a seating capacity of 3,000 people for basketball games, with 2,400 seats being in the permanent upper tier, and 600 seats being in the retractable lower tier.

The arena also contains a practice facility, and a weight training room.

== History ==
Chania Kladissos Indoor Hall was opened in 2005. The arena hosted the 2014 men's basketball HEBA Greek All Star Game. It also hosted the first round of the 2017 FIBA Europe Under-20 Championship.
