= Melina Merkouri Indoor Hall =

Basketball venue at Rethymno, Crete, Greece

- Rethymno Municipal Indoor Hall
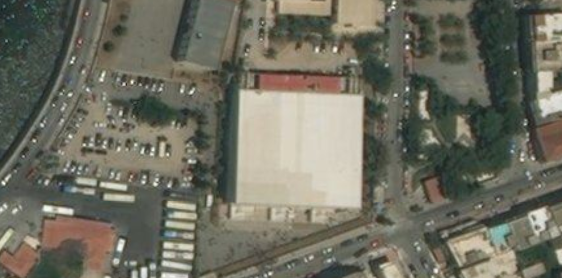
- Interactive map of Melina Merkouri Indoor Hall
- Location: Rethymno, Greece
- Coordinates: 35.3667°N 24.4697°E
- Owner: Rethymno Municipality
- Capacity: 1,600
- Surface: Parquet

Construction
- Opened: 1992
- Renovated: 2007, 2012
- Expanded: 2007

Tenant
- Rethymno Cretan Kings

Melina Merkouri Indoor Hall, or Rethymno Municipal Indoor Hall, is an indoor sporting arena that is located in the city of Rethymno, on the Greek island of Crete. The seating capacity of the arena for basketball games is 1,600 people. The arena is owned by the municipality of Rethymno. The arena is named after the famous Greek actress and politician, Melina Mercouri.

== History ==
The hall was opened in the year 1992. The arena has been used as the home arena of the Greek professional basketball team Rethymno Cretan Kings, of the Greek Basket League.

In recent years, the arena's seating capacity was increased from 1,100 to 1,600. This was done because Rethymno was going to compete in the top-tier level Greek Basket League, for the first time, during the Greek League 2007–08 season. The final phase of the 2007 FIBA Europe Under-16 Championship was held at the arena. The arena also hosted the 2017 FIBA Europe Under-20 Championship.

There are currently plans to further expand the arena again, in the near future.
