= Şahin =

Şahin (Turkish pronunciation: [ʃaːˈhin]; Persian: شاهين, romanized: Shāhīn) is a Turkish and Tatar name of Persian origin that means "hawk" or "falcon" in Persian. This surname has been attributed to individuals and families of different ethnicities, religions and minorities, in the territories of the Republic of Turkey after the fall of the multiethnic Ottoman Empire, following the enactment of the 1934 Surname Law. Variations include the name Shahin, which may be after the 14th century Jewish poet, and Chahine, amongst Christians in Lebanon. Notable people with the name include:

== Surname ==
- Ali Şahin (wrestler) (born 1944), Turkish wrestler
- Arif Sahin (born 1985), Turkish footballer
- Asiye Özlem Şahin (born 1976), Turkish-German boxer
- Ayşe Şahin, Turkish-American mathematician
- Bahanur Şahin Gökalp (born 1991), Turkish volleyball player
- Bekir Şahin (born 1960), Turkish jurist and judge
- Bahar Şahin (born 1997), Turkish actress
- Canan Şahin (born 1970), Turkish-Kurdish multidisciplinary visual artist, activist
- Caner Şahin (born 1992), Turkish actor
- Cansu Şahin (born 1993), Turkish entrepreneur and business executive
- Celal Şahin (1925–2018), Turkish musician and humorist
- Cenk Şahin (born 1994), Turkish footballer
- Devrim Şahin (born 2007), Turkish footballer
- Ebru Şahin (born 1994), Turkish actress
- Elif Şahin (born 2001), Turkish female volleyball player
- Emre Şahin, Turkish director
- Ercan Şahin (born 1971), Turkish folk musician.
- Fatma Şahin (born 1966), Turkish politician
- Fatma Şahin (footballer) (born 1990), Turkish footballer
- Hafize Şahin (born 1992), Turkish sport wrestler
- Hülya Şahin (born 1974), Turkish boxer
- İbrahim Şahin (born 1956), Turkish police chief
- İbrahim Şahin (footballer) (born 1984), Turkish footballer
- İdris Naim Şahin (born 1956), Turkish politician
- İrem Damla Şahin (born 2000), Turkish footballer
- İrfan Şahin (born 1963), Turkish TV executive
- Kemal Şahin, Turkish entrepreneur
- Kenan Şahin (born 1984), Turkish footballer
- Mehmet Ali Şahin (born 1950), Turkish politician
- Metin Şahin (born 1963), European champion Turkish former taekwondo practitioner
- Muammer Şahin (born 1994), Turkish weightlifter
- Murat Şahin (born 1976), Turkish footballer
- Nihat Şahin (born 1989), Turkish footballer
- Nuri Şahin (born 1988), Turkish footballer
- Nuri Şahin (volleyball) (born 1980), Turkish volleyball player
- Ramazan Şahin (born 1983), Turkish freestyle wrestler
- Reyhan Şahin (born 1980 or 1981), German-speaking rapper, radio host and actor of Turkish ethnicity
- Saliha Şahin (born 1998), Turkish female volleybaşş player
- Selçuk Şahin (footballer born 1981), Turkish footballer
- Selçuk Şahin (footballer, born 1983), Turkish footballer
- Selin Şahin (born 1992), Turkish wheelchair basketball player
- Serkan Şahin (born 1988), Turkish footballer
- Sıla Şahin, German-born actress of Turkish descent
- Timuçin Şahin (born 1973), Turkish jazz guitarist
- Turgut Doğan Şahin (born 1988), Turkish footballer
- Tülin Şahin (born 1980), Turkish-Danish top model, television presenter, fashion designer, author, and actress
- Uğur Şahin (born 1965), Turkish-German physician, immunologist and CEO of BioNTech
- Vasip Şahin (born 1964), Turkish civil servant
- Yasemin Şahin (born 1988), Turkish handball player

=== Given name ===
- Şahin Aygüneş (born 1990), Turkish footballer
- Şahin Bey (1877–1920), Turkish militia officer
- Şahin Giray (1745-1787), last khan of Crimea
- Şahin İmranov (born 1980), Azerbaijani boxer
- Şahin Irmak (born 1981), Turkish actor
- Sahin Ismayilov (born 1986), Azerbaijani politician
- Şahin Menge (born 1965), Turkish weightlifter
- Şahin Şenoduncu (born 1994), Turkish race walker
- Şahin Yakut (born 1979), Turkish kickboxer

== See also ==
- Tofaş Şahin, an automobile sold by Tofaş
- Shahin, that also includes listings for Shaheen and Chahine
- Shahinur
