= 2015 FIBA Europe Under-18 Championship =

International basketball competition

2015 EuroBasket Under-18
32nd FIBA Europe Under-18 Championship

Tournament details
- Host country: Greece
- Dates: 23 July – 2 August 2015
- Teams: 16
- Venue(s): 2 (in 1 (Volos) host cities)

Final positions
- Champions: Greece (2nd title)

Tournament statistics
- MVP: (Greece) Vassilis Charalampopoulos
- Top scorer: (Finland) Markkanen (18.2)
- Top rebounds: (Croatia) Zubac (12.9)
- Top assists: (Serbia) Stojanović (7.1)
- PPG (Team): Serbia (74.1)
- RPG (Team): Germany (47.3)
- APG (Team): Serbia (18.6)

Official website
- FIBA Archive

The 2015 FIBA Europe Under-18 Championship was the 32nd edition of the FIBA Europe Under-18 Championship. 16 teams participated in the competition, which was held in Volos, Greece, from 23 July to 2 August 2015.

== Participating teams ==
- Bosnia and Herzegovina
- Croatia
- Czech Republic
- Finland ▲ (3rd place, 2014 FIBA Europe Under-18 Championship Division B)
- France
- Germany ▲ (Winners, 2014 FIBA Europe Under-18 Championship Division B)
- Greece
- Italy
- Latvia
- Lithuania
- Montenegro
- Russia
- Serbia
- Spain
- Turkey
- Ukraine ▲ (Runners-up, 2014 FIBA Europe Under-18 Championship Division B)

== Venues ==
Volos	Portariá	2015 FIBA Europe Under-18 Championship is located in Greece
Nea Ionia Indoor Hall	Portaria Indoor Hall	2015 FIBA Europe Under-18 Championship is located in Greece
Capacity: 1,964	Capacity: 650	2015 FIBA Europe Under-18 Championship is located in Greece

== First round ==
In the first round, the sixteen teams were allocated in four groups of four teams each. The top three teams of each group qualified for the second round. The last team of each group played in the Classification Group G first, then in the 9th–16th place playoffs.

All times are local – Eastern European Summer Time (UTC+3).

=== Group A ===
Pos	Team	Pld	W	L	PF	PA	PD	Pts	Qualification
1	France	3	3	0	215	143	+72	6	Advance to second round
2	Spain	3	2	1	189	181	+8	5	Advance to second round
3	Czech Republic	3	1	2	155	201	−46	4	Advance to second round
4	Ukraine	3	0	3	180	214	−34	3	Classification Group G

Source: FIBA Archive

23 July 2015
14:30

Boxscore

Spain	58–64	France
Scoring by quarter: 16–10, 14–20, 16–18, 12–16
Scoring by half: 30–30
Pts: Vilà 16; Rebs: Vilà 7 Asts: Rico 5		Pts: Loubaki 18; Rebs: Gombauld 8 Asts: Ntilikina 7

Portaria Indoor Hall, Volos – Thessaly (GRE)
Attendance: 100
Referees: Spyridon Gontas (GRE), Ivan Miličević (BIH), Christoph Rohacky (AUT)

23 July 2015
19:00

Boxscore

Czech Republic	68–65	Ukraine
Scoring by quarter: 27–15, 15–25, 16–10, 10–15
Scoring by half: 42–40
Pts: Fleischhans 15; Rebs: Pursl 8 Asts: Fleischhans 4		Pts: Tkachenko 12; Rebs: Tkachenko 12; Asts: Zotov 10

Portaria Indoor Hall, Volos – Thessaly (GRE)
Attendance: 120
Referees: Tomasz Trawicki (POL), Luka Kardum (CRO), Vilius Maciulaitis (LTU)

24 July 2015
14:30

Boxscore

France	75–38	Czech Republic
Scoring by quarter: 20–8, 20–13, 19–7, 16–10
Scoring by half: 40–21
Pts: Gombauld 18; Rebs: Gombauld 10; Asts: Ntilikina 4		Pts: Chaloupa 10; Rebs: Pursl 5 Asts: Cenek, Goga 3

Neo Ionia Indoor Hall, Volos – Thessaly (GRE)
Attendance: 100
Referees: Dragan Nešković (SRB), Zafer Yilmaz (TUR), Henri Hilke (FIN)

24 July 2015
16:45

Boxscore

Ukraine	68–70	Spain
Scoring by quarter: 16–19, 16–15, 15–21, 21–15
Scoring by half: 32–34
Pts: Skapintsev; Rebs: Pavlov 7 Asts: Musiyenko, Tkachenko 5		Pts: Vilà 15; Rebs: Yusta, Mazaira 5 Asts: Rico, Garcia 6

Neo Ionia Indoor Hall, Volos – Thessaly (GRE)
Attendance: 350
Referees: Ivan Miličević (BIH), Nikolaos Somos (GRE), Marek Kukelčik (SVK)

25 July 2015
14:30

Boxscore

Spain	61–49	Czech Republic
Scoring by quarter: 15–8, 17–15, 15–19, 14–7
Scoring by half: 32–23
Pts: Vilà 16; Rebs: Vilà 12; Asts: López-Arostegui 5		Pts: Pursl 12; Rebs: Pursl 11; Asts: Fleischhans 3

Portaria Indoor Hall, Volos – Thessaly (GRE)
Attendance: 150
Referees: Olegs Latisevs (LAT), Dragan Nešković (SRB), Gennadi Ponomarev (RUS)

25 July 2015
16:45

Boxscore

Ukraine	47–76	France
Scoring by quarter: 5–21, 21–11, 6–25, 15–19
Scoring by half: 26–32
Pts: Tkachenko 12; Rebs: Antonenko 6 Asts: Tyrtyshnyk 4		Pts: Denis 13; Rebs: Poirier 9 Asts: Leboeuf 8

Portaria Indoor Hall, Volos – Thessaly (GRE)
Attendance: 100
Referees: Igor Dragojević (MNE), Ciprian Stoica (ROU), Petr Hruša (CZE)

=== Group B ===
Pos	Team	Pld	W	L	PF	PA	PD	Pts	Qualification
1	Germany	3	2	1	204	196	+8	5 (Note: Serbia–Germany 56–65)	Advance to second round
2	Serbia	3	2	1	194	175	+19	5	Advance to second round
3	Latvia	3	1	2	210	212	−2	4 (Note: Montenegro–Latvia 61–70)	Advance to second round
4	Montenegro	3	1	2	171	196	−25	4	Classification Group G

Source: FIBA Archive
Notes:

23 July 2015
16:45

Boxscore

Montenegro	61–70	Latvia
Scoring by quarter: 16–17, 15–16, 14–12, 16–25
Scoring by half: 31–33
Pts: Popović 28; Rebs: Radonjić 7 Asts: Bakić 4		Pts: Kohs 18; Rebs: Raimo 10; Asts: Birkans 6

Portaria Indoor Hall, Volos – Thessaly (GRE)
Attendance: 100
Referees: Manuel Mazzoni (ITA), Nikolaos Somos (GRE), Marek Kukelčik (SVK)

23 July 2015
21:15

Boxscore

Serbia	56–65	Germany
Scoring by quarter: 16–18, 11–13, 16–20, 13–14
Scoring by half: 27–31
Pts: Stojanović 17; Rebs: Miladinović 10; Asts: Stojanović 6		Pts: Mushidi 16; Rebs: Hartenstein 8 Asts: Taras 5

Portaria Indoor Hall, Volos – Thessaly (GRE)
Attendance: 150
Referees: David Romano (ISR), Zafer Yilmaz (TUR), Henri Hilke (FIN)

24 July 2015
19:00

Boxscore

Germany	55–64	Montenegro
Scoring by quarter: 11–10, 16–17, 18–13, 10–24
Scoring by half: 27–27
Pts: Kiel 12; Rebs: Kiel 12; Asts: Zeeb 4		Pts: Bakić 19; Rebs: Radonjić 9 Asts: Popović 5

Neo Ionia Indoor Hall, Volos – Thessaly (GRE)
Attendance: 600
Referees: Milan Brziak (SVK), Luka Kardum (CRO), Gennadi Ponomarev (RUS)

24 July 2015
21:15

Boxscore

Latvia	64–67	Serbia
Scoring by quarter: 15–19, 16–15, 20–14, 13–19
Scoring by half: 31–34
Pts: Zoriks 20; Rebs: Gutmanis, Silins 7 Asts: Zoriks, Raimo 3		Pts: Miladinović 14; Rebs: Miladinović 13; Asts: Stojanović 4

Portaria Indoor Hall, Volos – Thessaly (GRE)
Attendance: 80
Referees: Spyridon Gontas (GRE), Ciprian Stoica (ROU), Rain Peerandi (EST)

25 July 2015
19:00

Boxscore

Serbia	71–46	Montenegro
Scoring by quarter: 24–12, 8–8, 17–18, 22–8
Scoring by half: 32–20
Pts: Glišić 14; Rebs: Glišić 10; Asts: Stojanović 9		Pts: Popović 11; Rebs: Grković 8 Asts: Cupara 4

Neo Ionia Indoor Hall, Volos – Thessaly (GRE)
Attendance: 500
Referees: Manuel Mazzoni (ITA), Zafer Yilmaz (TUR), Yohan Rosso (FRA)

25 July 2015
21:15

Boxscore

Latvia	76–84	Germany
Scoring by quarter: 12–25, 26–20, 18–21, 20–18
Scoring by half: 38–45
Pts: Kohs 27; Rebs: Blumbergs 5 Asts: Zoriks 8		Pts: Hartenstein 21; Rebs: Hartenstein 11; Asts: Mushidi 4

Portaria Indoor Hall, Volos – Thessaly (GRE)
Attendance: 90
Referees: Ivan Miličević (BIH), Nikolaos Somos (GRE), Vilius Maciulaitis (LTU)

=== Group C ===
Pos	Team	Pld	W	L	PF	PA	PD	Pts	Qualification
1	Turkey	3	3	0	209	169	+40	6	Advance to second round
2	Italy	3	2	1	183	171	+12	5	Advance to second round
3	Russia	3	1	2	201	205	−4	4	Advance to second round
4	Finland	3	0	3	193	241	−48	3	Classification Group G

Source: FIBA Archive

23 July 2015
14:30

Boxscore

Finland	62–89	Russia
Scoring by quarter: 12–20, 17–30, 14–25, 19–14
Scoring by half: 29–50
Pts: Markkanen 19; Rebs: Markkanen 4 Asts: Kivimäki 5		Pts: Yakushin 22; Rebs: Sopin 8 Asts: Sopin 6

Neo Ionia Indoor Hall, Volos – Thessaly (GRE)
Attendance: 150
Referees: Igor Dragojević (MNE), Ciprian Stoica (ROU), Julio Cesar Anaya Freile (PAN)

23 July 2015
19:00

Boxscore

Italy	48–49	Turkey
Scoring by quarter: 11–14, 13–16, 12–12, 12–7
Scoring by half: 24–30
Pts: Sgorbati 11; Rebs: Sgorbati, Nwohuocha 6 Asts: Caroti 3		Pts: Korkmaz 19; Rebs: Bayrak 10; Asts: Al 4

Neo Ionia Indoor Hall, Volos – Thessaly (GRE)
Attendance: 700
Referees: Olegs Latisevs (LAT), Dragan Nešković (SRB), Rain Peerandi (EST)

24 July 2015
14:30

Boxscore

Turkey	80–63	Finland
Scoring by quarter: 24–14, 21–23, 20–14, 15–12
Scoring by half: 45–37
Pts: Korkmaz 14; Rebs: Yurtseven 12; Asts: Al, Enes Taskiran 7		Pts: Markkanen 15; Rebs: Markkanen 6 Asts: Maxhuni 4

Portaria Indoor Hall, Volos – Thessaly (GRE)
Attendance: 100
Referees: Borys Ryzhyk (UKR), Tomasz Trawicki (POL), Vilius Maciulaitis (LTU)

24 July 2015
16:45

Boxscore

Russia	54–63	Italy
Scoring by quarter: 4–15, 21–13, 13–24, 16–11
Scoring by half: 25–28
Pts: Yakushin 11; Rebs: Lopatin 11; Asts: Andreev 3		Pts: Caroti 12; Rebs: Cesana 9 Asts: Cesana 6

Portaria Indoor Hall, Volos – Thessaly (GRE)
Attendance: 150
Referees: David Romano (ISR), Petr Hruša (CZE), Yohan Rosso (FRA)

25 July 2015
14:30

Boxscore

Russia	58–80	Turkey
Scoring by quarter: 16–20, 19–10, 5–35, 18–15
Scoring by half: 3530
Pts: Volkhin 11; Rebs: Shpakov, Tonoyan 5 Asts: Sopin 8		Pts: Korkmaz 18; Rebs: Yurtseven 10; Asts: Al 8

Neo Ionia Indoor Hall, Volos – Thessaly (GRE)
Attendance: 100
Referees: Vicente Bulto (ESP), Luka Kardum (CRO), Marek Kukelcik (SVK)

25 July 2015
16:45

Boxscore

Italy	72–68	Finland
Scoring by quarter: 19–13, 10–16, 19–22, 24–17
Scoring by half: 29–29
Pts: Caroti 16; Rebs: 3 players 5 Asts: Moretti 4		Pts: Markkanen 15; Rebs: Laine 8 Asts: Maxhuni 7

Neo Ionia Indoor Hall, Volos – Thessaly (GRE)
Attendance: 200
Referees: Spyridon Gontas (GRE), Christoph Rohacky (AUT), Rain Peerandi (EST)

=== Group D ===
Pos	Team	Pld	W	L	PF	PA	PD	Pts	Qualification
1	Lithuania	3	3	0	215	180	+35	6	Advance to second round
2	Greece	3	1	2	187	171	+16	4 (Note: Greece 3pts/123:101 (+22) :: Greece–Croatia 64–41, Greece–Bosnia and Herzegovina 59–60)	Advance to second round
3	Bosnia and Herzegovina	3	1	2	186	209	−23	4 (Note: Bosnia and Herzegovina 3pts/136:136 (0) :: Croatia–Bosnia and Herzegovina 77–76, Greece–Bosnia and Herzegovina 59–60)	Advance to second round
4	Croatia	3	1	2	184	212	−28	4 (Note: Croatia 3pts/118:140 (–22) :: Greece–Croatia 64–41, Croatia–Bosnia and Herzegovina 77–76)	Classification Group G

Source: FIBA Archive
Notes:

23 July 2015
16:45

Boxscore

Bosnia and Herzegovina	50–73	Lithuania
Scoring by quarter: 17–23, 14–16, 7–16, 12–18
Scoring by half: 31–39
Pts: Atić 18; Rebs: Durmo 5 Asts: Aleksić, Atić 3		Pts: Varnas 19; Rebs: Varnas 10; Asts: Varnas 6

Neo Ionia Indoor Hall, Volos – Thessaly (GRE)
Attendance: 150
Referees: Vicente Bulto (ESP), Milan Brziak (SVK), Gennadi Ponomarev (RUS)

23 July 2015
21:15

Boxscore

Greece	64–41	Croatia
Scoring by quarter: 18–7, 20–16, 20–10, 6–8
Scoring by half: 38–23
Pts: Charalampopoulos 17; Rebs: 3 players 8 Asts: Flionis 6		Pts: Skokna, Vrkic 9 Rebs: Zubac 18; Asts: Kalajžić 3

Neo Ionia Indoor Hall, Volos – Thessaly (GRE)
Attendance: 1400
Referees: Borys Ryzhyk (UKR), Yohan Rosso (FRA), Petr Hruša (CZE)

24 July 2015
19:00

Boxscore

Croatia	77–76	Bosnia and Herzegovina
Scoring by quarter: 11–24, 18–23, 23–15, 25–14
Scoring by half: 29–47
Pts: Zubac 15; Rebs: Zubac 13; Asts: Skokna 5		Pts: Memić 20; Rebs: Gegić 8 Asts: Aleksić 6

Portaria Indoor Hall, Volos – Thessaly (GRE)
Attendance: 100
Referees: Olegs Latisevs (LAT), Manuel Mazzoni (ITA), Julio Cesar Anaya Freile (PAN)

24 July 2015
21:15

Boxscore

Lithuania	70–64	Greece
Scoring by quarter: 10–16, 22–20, 16–10, 22–18
Scoring by half: 32–36
Pts: Beliauskas, Varnas 14; Rebs: Sedekerskis 7 Asts: Varnas 5		Pts: Skoulidas 18; Rebs: Papagiannis 9 Asts: Skoulidas, Charalampopoulos 4

Neo Ionia Indoor Hall, Volos – Thessaly (GRE)
Attendance: 1750
Referees: Vicente Bulto (ESP), Igor Dragojević (MNE), Christoph Rohacky (AUT)

25 July 2015
19:00

Boxscore

Lithuania	72–66	Croatia
Scoring by quarter: 13–19, 21–13, 25–21, 13–13
Scoring by half: 34–32
Pts: Sedekerskis 15; Rebs: Birutis 8 Asts: Varnas 7		Pts: Zubac, Vrkić 17; Rebs: Zubac 11; Asts: Skokna 5

Portaria Indoor Hall, Volos – Thessaly (GRE)
Attendance: 150
Referees: Borys Ryzhyk (UKR), Milan Brziak (SVK), Henri Hilke (FIN)

25 July 2015
21:15

Boxscore

Greece	59–60	Bosnia and Herzegovina
Scoring by quarter: 13–8, 19–22, 19–12, 8–18
Scoring by half: 32–30
Pts: Christidis 16; Rebs: Papagiannis 12; Asts: Lountzis, Charalampopoulos 4		Pts: Gegić 15; Rebs: Đedović 10; Asts: 3 players 3

Neo Ionia Indoor Hall, Volos – Thessaly (GRE)
Attendance: 1500
Referees: Tomasz Trawicki (POL), David Romano (ISR), Julio Cesar Anaya Freile (PAN)

== Second round ==
Twelve advancing teams from the first round were allocated in two groups of six teams each. The top four teams of each group advanced to the quarterfinals. The last two teams of each group played in the 9th–16th place playoffs against the teams from the Group G.

=== Group E ===
Pos	Team	Pld	W	L	PF	PA	PD	Pts	Qualification
1	France	5	4	1	383	307	+76	9	Advance to Quarterfinals
2	Spain	5	3	2	342	323	+19	8 (Note: Spain 4pts/150:135 (+15) :: Serbia–Spain 62–74, Spain–Germany 76–73)	Advance to Quarterfinals
3	Germany	5	3	2	370	344	+26	8 (Note: Germany 3pts/138:132 (+6) :: Serbia–Germany 56–65, Spain–Germany 76–73)	Advance to Quarterfinals
4	Serbia	5	3	2	346	334	+12	8 (Note: Serbia 2pts/118:139 (–21) :: Serbia–Germany 56–65, Serbia–Spain 62–74)	Advance to Quarterfinals
5	Latvia	5	2	3	369	371	−2	7	9th – 16th place playoffs
6	Czech Republic	5	0	5	257	388	−131	5	9th – 16th place playoffs

Source: FIBA Archive
Notes:

27 July 2015
14:30

Boxscore

Latvia	62–91	France
Scoring by quarter: 13–21, 22–23, 17–29, 10–18
Scoring by half: 35–44
Pts: Kohs 16; Rebs: Raimo 5 Asts: Birkans 4		Pts: Loubaki, Gombauld 16; Rebs: Gombauld 11; Asts: Ntilikina 8

Neo Ionia Indoor Hall, Volos – Thessaly (GRE)
Attendance: 150
Referees: Spyridon Gontas (GRE), Julio Cesar Anaya Freile(PAN), Henri Hilke(FIN)

27 July 2015
16:45

Boxscore

Czech Republic	47–74	Germany
Scoring by quarter: 12–20, 13–19, 7–23, 15–12
Scoring by half: 25–39
Pts: David 13; Rebs: Pursl 6 Asts: Fleischhans 6		Pts: Freudenberg 13; Rebs: Keßen 12; Asts: 4 players 4

Neo Ionia Indoor Hall, Volos – Thessaly (GRE)
Attendance: 200
Referees: Igor Dragojević (MNE), Zafer Yilmaz (TUR), Marek Kukelčik (SVK)

27 July 2015
19:00

Boxscore

Serbia	62–74	Spain
Scoring by quarter: 15–14, 17–19, 8–19, 22–22
Scoring by half: 32–33
Pts: Aranitović 17; Rebs: Glišić 8 Asts: Stojanović 3		Pts: Vilà 16; Rebs: Yusta 6 Asts: Rico 6

Portaria Indoor Hall, Volos – Thessaly (GRE)
Attendance: 90
Referees: Borys Ryzhyk (UKR), Milan Brziak (SVK), Vilius Maciulaitis (LTU)

28 July 2015
14:30

Boxscore

Latvia	92–56	Czech Republic
Scoring by quarter: 14–18, 22–8, 20–18, 36–12
Scoring by half: 36–26
Pts: Kohs 22; Rebs: Krumins 9 Asts: Birkans 13		Pts: Fleischhans 11; Rebs: Chaloupka, Pursl 7 Asts: Tuma 3

Neo Ionia Indoor Hall, Volos – Thessaly (GRE)
Attendance: 60
Referees: David Romano (ISR), Ivan Miličević (BIH), Gennadi Ponomarev (RUS)

28 July 2015
16:45

Boxscore

France	64–75	Serbia
Scoring by quarter: 19–18, 19–17, 5–23, 21–17
Scoring by half: 38–35
Pts: Gombauld 13; Rebs: Gombauld 9 Asts: Loubaki 5		Pts: Simanić 27; Rebs: Simanić 9 Asts: Stojanović 7

Neo Ionia Indoor Hall, Volos – Thessaly (GRE)
Attendance: 200
Referees: Manuel Mazzoni (ITA), Zafer Yilmaz (TUR), Nikolaos Somos (GRE)

28 July 2015
21:15

Boxscore

Spain	76–73	Germany
Scoring by quarter: 21–19, 25–18, 16–15, 14–21
Scoring by half: 46–37
Pts: Garcia 23; Rebs: Lopez-Arosteguj 8 Asts: Lopez-Arosteguj 4		Pts: Hartenstein 16; Rebs: Hartenstein 12; Asts: Kiel 4

Portaria Indoor Hall, Volos – Thessaly (GRE)
Attendance: 120
Referees: Spyridon Gontas (GRE), Tomasz Trawicki (POL), Luka Kardum (CRO)

29 July 2015
16:45

Boxscore

Spain	73–75	Latvia
Scoring by quarter: 20–10, 20–32, 22–12, 11–21
Scoring by half: 40–42
Pts: Yusta 19; Rebs: Amo 8 Asts: Rico 4		Pts: Raimo 17; Rebs: Raimo 11; Asts: Birkans 5

Neo Ionia Indoor Hall, Volos – Thessaly (GRE)
Attendance: 200
Referees: Borys Ryzhyk (UKR), Nikolaos Somos (GRE), Vilius Maciulaitis (LTU)

29 July 2015
19:00

Boxscore

Serbia	86–67	Czech Republic
Scoring by quarter: 20–19, 19–20, 28–14, 19–14
Scoring by half: 39–39
Pts: Jovanović 19; Rebs: Miladinović 14; Asts: Stojanović 12		Pts: Pursl 18; Rebs: Pursl 9 Asts: Tuma 4

Portaria Indoor Hall, Volos – Thessaly (GRE)
Attendance: 110
Referees: Spyridon Gontas (GRE), Christoph Rohacky (AUT), Henri Hilke (FIN)

29 July 2015
21:15

Boxscore

Germany	74–89	France
Scoring by quarter: 24–28, 22–14, 10–27, 18–20
Scoring by half: 46–42
Pts: Kratzer, Hartenstein 16; Rebs: Hartenstein 9 Asts: Zeeb 4		Pts: Tchouaffe 21; Rebs: Gombauld 9 Asts: Ntilikina 7

Portaria Indoor Hall, Volos – Thessaly (GRE)
Attendance: 134
Referees: David Romano (ISR), Ciprian Stoica (ROU), Gennadi Ponomarev (RUS)

=== Group F ===
Pos	Team	Pld	W	L	PF	PA	PD	Pts	Qualification
1	Turkey	5	4	1	336	307	+29	9	Advance to Quarterfinals
2	Lithuania	5	3	2	353	329	+24	8 (Note: Lithuania 4pts/143:114 (+29) :: Bosnia and Herzegovina–Lithuania 50–73, Lithuania–Greece 70–64)	Advance to Quarterfinals
3	Bosnia and Herzegovina	5	3	2	306	332	−26	8 (Note: Bosnia and Herzegovina 3pts/110:132 (–22) :: Bosnia and Herzegovina–Lithuania 50–73, Greece–Bosnia and Herzegovina 59–60)	Advance to Quarterfinals
4	Greece	5	3	2	324	293	+31	8 (Note: Greece 2pts/123:130 (–7) :: Lithuania–Greece 70–64, Greece–Bosnia and Herzegovina 59–60)	Advance to Quarterfinals
5	Italy	5	2	3	299	308	−9	7	9th – 16th place playoffs
6	Russia	5	0	5	295	344	−49	5	9th – 16th place playoffs

Source: FIBA Archive
Notes:

27 July 2015
19:00

Boxscore

Russia	65–73	Lithuania
Scoring by quarter: 14–13, 13–16, 14–24, 24–20
Scoring by half: 27–29
Pts: Shpakov 19; Rebs: Yakushin 6 Asts: Yakushin, Sopin 4		Pts: Varnas 19; Rebs: Sedekerskis 7 Asts: Beliauskas, Varnas 4

Neo Ionia Indoor Hall, Volos – Thessaly (GRE)
Attendance: 900
Referees: Dragan Nešković (SRB), Tomasz Trawicki (POL), Rain Peerandi (EST)

27 July 2015
21:15

Boxscore

Bosnia and Herzegovina	57–80	Turkey
Scoring by quarter: 10–18, 12–28, 20–11, 15–23
Scoring by half: 22–46
Pts: Đedović 13; Rebs: Manjgafić 5 Asts: Aleksić, Gegić 2		Pts: Korkmaz 14; Rebs: Yurtseven 11; Asts: Al 5

Portaria Indoor Hall, Volos – Thessaly (GRE)
Attendance: 80
Referees: Vicente Bulto (ESP), Christoph Rohacky (AUT), Yohan Rosso (FRA)

27 July 2015
21:15

Boxscore

Greece	63–52	Italy
Scoring by quarter: 24–11, 8–11, 20–11, 11–19
Scoring by half: 32–22
Pts: Skoulidas 17; Rebs: Papagiannis 10; Asts: Lountzis, Charalampopoulos 3		Pts: Moretti 15; Rebs: Cesana 7 Asts: Cesana, La Torre 3

Neo Ionia Indoor Hall, Volos – Thessaly (GRE)
Attendance: 1500
Referees: Olegs Latisevs (LAT), Ciprian Stoica (ROU), Luka Kardum (CRO)

28 July 2015
19:00

Boxscore

Bosnia and Herzegovina	67–61	Russia
Scoring by quarter: 13–19, 24–7, 20–18, 10–17
Scoring by half: 37–26
Pts: Atić 20; Rebs: 3 players 8 Asts: Atić 5		Pts: Karpenkov 20; Rebs: Karpenkov 9 Asts: Sopin 5

Portaria Indoor Hall, Volos – Thessaly (GRE)
Attendance: 85
Referees: Olegs Latisevs (LAT), Ciprian Stoica (ROU), Henri Hilke (FIN)

28 July 2015
19:00

Boxscore

Italy	77–70	Lithuania
Scoring by quarter: 20–19, 18–20, 22–11, 17–20
Scoring by half: 38–39
Pts: Cesana 22; Rebs: Moretti 6 Asts: Caroti 5		Pts: Sedekerskis 21; Rebs: Echodas 6 Asts: Pilauskas 7

Neo Ionia Indoor Hall, Volos – Thessaly (GRE)
Attendance: 900
Referees: Igor Dragojević (MNE), Petr Hrusa (CZE), Julio Cesar Anaya Freile (PAN)

28 July 2015
21:15

Boxscore

Turkey	54–77	Greece
Scoring by quarter: 8–20, 16–22, 13–21, 17–14
Scoring by half: 24–42
Pts: Gazi 17; Rebs: Yurtseven 7 Asts: Korkmaz 4		Pts: Papagiannis, Charalampopoulos 15; Rebs: Papagiannis 14; Asts: Mouratos 6

Neo Ionia Indoor Hall, Volos – Thessaly (GRE)
Attendance: 1700
Referees: Borys Ryzhyk (UKR), Milan Brziak (SVK), Yohan Rosso (FRA)

29 July 2015
14:30

Boxscore

Italy	59–72	Bosnia and Herzegovina
Scoring by quarter: 11–23, 19–22, 16–9, 13–18
Scoring by half: 30–45
Pts: Bolpin 20; Rebs: Sgorbati, Tote 8 Asts: Caroti, Tote 3		Pts: Atić 24; Rebs: Atić 17; Asts: Atić 5

Neo Ionia Indoor Hall, Volos – Thessaly (GRE)
Attendance: 100
Referees: Tomasz Trawicki (POL), Marek Kukelcik (SVK), Yohan Rosso (FRA)

29 July 2015
19:00

Boxscore

Lithuania	67–73	Turkey
Scoring by quarter: 18–16, 19–27, 14–13, 16–17
Scoring by half: 37–43
Pts: Varnas 25; Rebs: Echodas 9 Asts: Varnas 6		Pts: Korkmaz 22; Rebs: Korkmaz, Yurtseven 12; Asts: Al 4

Neo Ionia Indoor Hall, Volos – Thessaly (GRE)
Attendance: 1500
Referees: Vicente Bulto (ESP), Luka Kardum (CRO), Rain Peerandi (EST)

29 July 2015
21:15

Boxscore

Greece	61–57	Russia
Scoring by quarter: 11–11, 11–19, 21–16, 18–11
Scoring by half: 22–30
Pts: Milentigievits Alifieris 19; Rebs: Charalampopoulos 9 Asts: Diplaros 6		Pts: Yakushin 15; Rebs: Karpenkov 9 Asts: 3 players 2

Neo Ionia Indoor Hall, Volos – Thessaly (GRE)
Attendance: 1750
Referees: Dragan Nešković (SRB), Igor Dragojević (MNE), Julio Cesar Anaya Freile (PAN)

== Classification Group G ==
The last placed team from each group of the first round competed in a classification round-robin group for lower four seeds in 9th–16th place playoff.

Pos	Team	Pld	W	L	PF	PA	PD	Pts
1	Croatia	3	2	1	237	243	−6	5 (Note: Finland–Croatia 65–74)
2	Finland	3	2	1	222	223	−1	5
3	Ukraine	3	1	2	228	240	−12	4 (Note: Ukraine–Montenegro 60–58)
4	Montenegro	3	1	2	217	198	+19	4

Source: FIBA Archive
Notes:

27 July 2015
14:30

Boxscore

Montenegro	68–70	Finland
Scoring by quarter: 15–25, 24–14, 16–10, 13–21
Scoring by half: 39–39
Pts: Čarapić, Bakić 17; Rebs: Radonjić 10; Asts: Bakić 7		Pts: Maxhuni 21; Rebs: Nyman, Markkanen 5 Asts: Knihtinen 4

Portaria Indoor Hall, Volos – Thessaly (GRE)
Attendance: 80
Referees: Manuel Mazzoni (ITA), Petr Hrusa (CZE), Gennadi Ponomarev (RUS)

27 July 2015
16:45

Boxscore

Ukraine	87–95	Croatia
Scoring by quarter: 24–21, 16–19, 21–26, 26–29
Scoring by half: 40–40
Pts: Zotov 20; Rebs: Pavlov 8 Asts: Pavlov 4		Pts: Skokna 30; Rebs: Kalpić 7 Asts: Skokna 5

Portaria Indoor Hall, Volos – Thessaly (GRE)
Attendance: 100
Referees: David Romano (ISR), Nikolaos Somos (GRE), Ivan Miličević (BIH)

28 July 2015
14:30

Boxscore

Finland	87–81	Ukraine
Scoring by quarter: 23–28, 13–16, 25–14, 26–23
Scoring by half: 36–44
Pts: Maxhuni 28; Rebs: Markkanen 10; Asts: Laine 6		Pts: Shibel, Pavlov 16; Rebs: Skapintsev 12; Asts: Zotov 7

Portaria Indoor Hall, Volos – Thessaly (GRE)
Attendance: 70
Referees: Dragan Nešković (SRB), Vilius Maciulaitis (LTU), Marek Kukelčik (SVK)

28 July 2015
16:45

Boxscore

Croatia	68–91	Montenegro
Scoring by quarter: 14–26, 13–24, 18–21, 23–20
Scoring by half: 27–50
Pts: Kalajžić 19; Rebs: Čolak, Mikšić 4 Asts: Kalajžić, Mikšić 3		Pts: Popović 26; Rebs: Popović 11; Asts: Bakić 5

Portaria Indoor Hall, Volos – Thessaly (GRE)
Attendance: 53
Referees: Vicente Bulto (ESP), Christoph Rohacky (AUT), Rain Peerandi (EST)

29 July 2015
14:30

Boxscore

Ukraine	60–58	Montenegro
Scoring by quarter: 13–18, 14–16, 16–14, 17–10
Scoring by half: 27–34
Pts: Tkachenko 11; Rebs: Pavlov 11; Asts: Zotov 4		Pts: Popović 16; Rebs: Radonjić 16; Asts: Bakić 4

Portaria Indoor Hall, Volos – Thessaly (GRE)
Attendance: 80
Referees: Olegs Latisevs (LAT), Zafer Yilmaz (TUR), Milan Brziak (SVK)

29 July 2015
16:45

Boxscore

Finland	65–74	Croatia
Scoring by quarter: 17–25, 9–20, 23–11, 16–18
Scoring by half: 26–45
Pts: Maxhuni 22; Rebs: Markkanen 9 Asts: Knihtinen 3		Pts: Badžim 19; Rebs: Zubac 13; Asts: Mikšić 8

Portaria Indoor Hall, Volos – Thessaly (GRE)
Attendance: 100
Referees: Manuel Mazzoni (ITA), Ivan Miličević (BIH), Petr Hruša (CZE)

== Classification playoffs for 9th – 16th place ==
13th place match
G4	Montenegro	64
G2	Finland	68
15th place match
E6	Czech Republic	91
G3	Ukraine	99

13th – 16th place playoffs
G4	Montenegro	75
E6	Czech Republic	53
G3	Ukraine	77
G2	Finland	88

9th – 16th place playoffs
E5	Latvia	68
G4	Montenegro	65
E6	Czech Republic	70
G1	Croatia	82
F5	Italy	87
G3	Ukraine	69
F6	Russia	87
G2	Finland	64

9th – 12th place playoffs
E5	Latvia	78 OT
G1	Croatia	74
F5	Italy	67
F6	Russia	82

9th place match
E5	Latvia	68
F6	Russia	69
11th place match
G1	Croatia	57
F5	Italy	73

=== Classification games for 9th – 16th place ===
31 July 2015
14:30

Boxscore

Russia	87–64	Finland
Scoring by quarter: 27–21, 22–16, 18–8, 20–19
Scoring by half: 49–37
Pts: Volkhin 21; Rebs: Karpenkov 8 Asts: Sopin 9		Pts: Markkanen 16; Rebs: Markkanen 5 Asts: Laine 3

Portaria Indoor Hall, Volos – Thessaly (GRE)
Attendance: 60
Referees: Dragan Nešković (SRB), Ivan Miličević (BIH), Yohan Rosso (FRA)

31 July 2015
16:45

Boxscore

Italy	87–69	Ukraine
Scoring by quarter: 21–20, 25–14, 16–22, 25–13
Scoring by half: 46–34
Pts: Bolpin 20; Rebs: Guariglia 9 Asts: Cesana, Moretti 3		Pts: Shibel 17; Rebs: Shibel 8 Asts: Zotov 11

Portaria Indoor Hall, Volos – Thessaly (GRE)
Attendance: 74
Referees: Spyridon Gontas (GRE), Vilius Maciulaitis (LTU), Henri Hilke (FIN)

31 July 2015
19:00

Boxscore

Latvia	68–65	Montenegro
Scoring by quarter: 26–19, 13–22, 14–9, 15–15
Scoring by half: 39–41
Pts: 3 players 15; Rebs: Raimo 11; Asts: Birkans, Raimo 5		Pts: Čarapić 26; Rebs: Radonjić 8 Asts: Radonjić 3

Portaria Indoor Hall, Volos – Thessaly (GRE)
Attendance: 60
Referees: Vicente Bulto (ESP), Nikolaos Somos (GRE), Christoph Rohacky (AUT)

31 July 2015
21:15

Boxscore

Czech Republic	70–82	Croatia
Scoring by quarter: 16–22, 25–13, 16–23, 13–24
Scoring by half: 41–35
Pts: Roub 20; Rebs: Roub 8 Asts: 3 players 3		Pts: Skokna 31; Rebs: Zubac 15; Asts: Mikšić 5

Portaria Indoor Hall, Volos – Thessaly (GRE)
Attendance: 70
Referees: David Romano (ISR), Zafer Yilmaz (TUR), Marek Kukelcik (SVK)

=== Classification games for 13th – 16th place ===
1 August 2015
14:30

Boxscore

Ukraine	77–88	Finland
Scoring by quarter: 25–27, 24–17, 15–25, 13–19
Scoring by half: 49–44
Pts: Pavlov 23; Rebs: Tkachenko 11; Asts: Zotov 12		Pts: Markkanen 32; Rebs: Markkanen, Raitanen 7 Asts: Nikkarinen 5

Portaria Indoor Hall, Volos – Thessaly (GRE)
Attendance: 50
Referees: Manuel Mazzoni (ITA), Petr Hrusa (CZE), Marek Kukelcik (SVK)

1 August 2015
16:45

Boxscore

Montenegro	75–53	Czech Republic
Scoring by quarter: 19–18, 16–6, 17–16, 23–13
Scoring by half: 35–24
Pts: Radonjić 19; Rebs: Bakić 11; Asts: Čarapić 7		Pts: David 16; Rebs: Pursl 11; Asts: Fleischhans 3

Portaria Indoor Hall, Volos – Thessaly (GRE)
Attendance: 50
Referees: Borys Ryzhyk (UKR), Ciprian Stoica (ROU), Vilius Maciulaitis (LTU)

=== Classification games for 9th – 12th place ===
1 August 2015
19:00

Boxscore

Latvia	78–74 (OT)	Croatia
Scoring by quarter: 18–12, 12–22, 17–21, 23–15, Overtime: 8–4
Scoring by half: 30–34 Overtime: 8–4
Pts: Blumbergs, Zoriks 16; Rebs: Blumbergs 13; Asts: Raimo 8		Pts: Zubac 22; Rebs: Zubac 17; Asts: Mikšić 4

Portaria Indoor Hall, Volos – Thessaly (GRE)
Attendance: 62
Referees: Milan Brziak (SVK), Gennadi Ponomarev (RUS), Henri Hilke (FIN)

1 August 2015
21:15

Boxscore

Italy	67–82	Russia
Scoring by quarter: 12–19, 17–17, 14–26, 24–20
Scoring by half: 29–36
Pts: Bolpin 16; Rebs: Nwohuocha 6 Asts: Candi 4		Pts: Yakushin 22; Rebs: Karpenkov 9 Asts: 3 players 4

Portaria Indoor Hall, Volos – Thessaly (GRE)
Attendance: 60
Referees: Tomasz Trawicki (POL), Nikolaos Somos (GRE), Luka Kardum (CRO)

== Championship playoffs ==
Fifth place
E1	France	70
E4	Serbia	81
Seventh place
E3	Germany	64
E2	Spain	68

Consolation semifinals
E1	France	62
E3	Germany	55
E4	Serbia	90
E2	Spain	76

Quarterfinals
E1	France	59
F4	Greece	67
F2	Lithuania	73
E3	Germany	71
F1	Turkey	90 OT
E4	Serbia	79
E2	Spain	64
F3	Bosnia and Herzegovina	70

Semifinals
F4	Greece	68
F2	Lithuania	58
F1	Turkey	82
F3	Bosnia and Herzegovina	77

Final
F4	Greece	64
F1	Turkey	61
Third place
F2	Lithuania	74
F3	Bosnia and Herzegovina	49

=== Quarterfinals ===
31 July 2015
14:30

Boxscore

Spain	64–70	Bosnia and Herzegovina
Scoring by quarter: 19–23, 17–17, 19–7, 9–23
Scoring by half: 36–40
Pts: Lopez-Arosteguj 18; Rebs: Martinez 10; Asts: 3 players 4		Pts: Atić 28; Rebs: Atić 12; Asts: Aleksić 7

Neo Ionia Indoor Hall, Volos – Thessaly (GRE)
Attendance: 150
Referees: Olegs Latisevs (LAT), Milan Brziak (SVK), Gennadi Ponomarev (RUS)

31 July 2015
16:45

Boxscore

Turkey	90–79 (OT)	Serbia
Scoring by quarter: 22–21, 20–19, 13–21, 15–9, Overtime: 20–9
Scoring by half: 42–40 Overtime: 20–9
Pts: Korkmaz 21; Rebs: Korkmaz 11; Asts: Al 9		Pts: Aranitović 16; Rebs: Stojanović 13; Asts: Stojanović 6

Neo Ionia Indoor Hall, Volos – Thessaly (GRE)
Attendance: 300
Referees: Manuel Mazzoni (ITA), Ciprian Stoica (ROU), Julio Cesar Anaya Freile (PAN)

31 July 2015
19:00

Boxscore

Lithuania	73–71	Germany
Scoring by quarter: 18–23, 24–20, 19–16, 12–12
Scoring by half: 42–43
Pts: Sedekerskis, Birutis 15; Rebs: Birutis 14; Asts: Varnas 6		Pts: Mushidi 18; Rebs: Hartenstein 11; Asts: Mushidi 5

Neo Ionia Indoor Hall, Volos – Thessaly (GRE)
Attendance: 1500
Referees: Tomasz Trawicki (POL), Igor Dragojević (MNE), Petr Hruša (CZE)

31 July 2015
21:15

Boxscore

France	59–67	Greece
Scoring by quarter: 16–16, 16–18, 14–21, 13–12
Scoring by half: 32–34
Pts: Ntilikina 17; Rebs: Jeanne 15; Asts: 3 players 2		Pts: Papagiannis 21; Rebs: Papagiannis 13; Asts: Charalampopoulos 11

Neo Ionia Indoor Hall, Volos – Thessaly (GRE)
Attendance: 1750
Referees: Borys Ryzhyk (UKR), Luka Kardum (CRO), Rain Peerandi (EST)

=== Classification games for 5th – 8th place ===
1 August 2015
14:30

Boxscore

Serbia	90–76	Spain
Scoring by quarter: 21–21, 28–21, 16–16, 25–18
Pts: Stojanović 26; Rebs: Stojanović 8 Asts: Stojanović 10		Pts: Lopez-Arosteguj 15; Rebs: Barreiro, Vilà 6 Asts: Lopez-Arosteguj 7

Neo Ionia Indoor Hall, Volos – Thessaly (GRE)
Attendance: 100
Referees: Spyridon Gontas (GRE), Christoph Rohacky (AUT), Yohan Rosso (FRA)

1 August 2015
16:45

Boxscore

France	62–55	Germany
Scoring by quarter: 18–8, 18–15, 8–21, 18–11
Pts: Jeanne, Gombauld 12; Rebs: Gombauld 9 Asts: Loubaki, Ntilikina 5		Pts: Mushidi 14; Rebs: 3 players 7 Asts: Mushidi 3

Neo Ionia Indoor Hall, Volos – Thessaly (GRE)
Attendance: 150
Referees: Dragan Nešković (SRB), Zafer Yilmaz (TUR), Ivan Miličević (BIH)

=== Semifinals ===
1 August 2015
19:00

Boxscore

Turkey	82–77	Bosnia and Herzegovina
Scoring by quarter: 18–20, 13–27, 32–16, 19–14
Pts: Taskiran 27; Rebs: Yurtseven 11; Asts: Korkmaz 7		Pts: Atić 25; Rebs: Atić 11; Asts: Atić 8

Neo Ionia Indoor Hall, Volos – Thessaly (GRE)
Attendance: 1500
Referees: Vicente Bulto (ESP), David Romano (ISR), Rain Peerandi (EST)

1 August 2015
21:15

Boxscore

Greece	68–58	Lithuania
Scoring by quarter: 14–12, 15–15, 16–16, 23–15
Pts: Charalampopoulos 22; Rebs: Charalampopoulos 14; Asts: Charalampopoulos 7		Pts: Beliauskas 19; Rebs: Sedekerskis 15; Asts: Varnas 5

Neo Ionia Indoor Hall, Volos – Thessaly (GRE)
Attendance: 1700
Referees: Olegs Latisevs (LAT), Igor Dragojević (MNE), Julio Cesar Anaya Freile (PAN)

== Final classification games ==
=== Match for 15th place ===
2 August 2015
12:00

Boxscore

Czech Republic	91–99 (OT)	Ukraine
Scoring by quarter: 16–24, 27–16, 18–26, 20–15, Overtime: 10–18
Pts: Chaloupka 22; Rebs: Chaloupka 20; Asts: Cenek 8		Pts: Antonenko 29; Rebs: Khokhonyk 11; Asts: Khokhonyk, Musiyenko 6

Portaria Indoor Hall, Volos – Thessaly (GRE)
Attendance: 20
Referees: Igor Dragojević (MNE), Rain Peerandi (EST), Henri Hilke (FIN)

=== Match for 13th place ===
2 August 2015
16:30

Boxscore

Montenegro	64–68	Finland
Scoring by quarter: 10–20, 16–13, 19–16, 19–19
Pts: Bakić 25; Rebs: Bakić 7 Asts: Bakić 3		Pts: Maxhuni 19; Rebs: Raitanen 6 Asts: Nikkarinen, Maxhuni 4

Portaria Indoor Hall, Volos – Thessaly (GRE)
Attendance: 20
Referees: Spyridon Gontas (GRE), David Romano (ISR), Zafer Yilmaz (TUR)

=== Match for 11th place ===
2 August 2015
14:15

Boxscore

Croatia	57–73	Italy
Scoring by quarter: 16–21, 11–24, 20–11, 10–17
Pts: Zubac 18; Rebs: Zubac 11; Asts: Mikšić 6		Pts: Moretti 13; Rebs: Cesana 8 Asts: Cesana 5

Portaria Indoor Hall, Volos – Thessaly (GRE)
Attendance: 20
Referees: Vicente Bulto (ESP), Vilius Maciulaitis (LTU), Christoph Rohacky (AUT)

=== Match for 9th place ===
2 August 2015
18:45

Boxscore

Latvia	68–69	Russia
Scoring by quarter: 18–13, 17–17, 9–23, 24–16
Pts: Krumins 24; Rebs: Blumbergs, Raimo 6 Asts: Zoriks 9		Pts: Volkhin 25; Rebs: Karpenkov, Yakushin 9 Asts: Yakushin 7

Portaria Indoor Hall, Volos – Thessaly (GRE)
Attendance: 20

=== Match for 7th place ===
2 August 2015
14:30

Boxscore

Germany	64–68	Spain
Scoring by quarter: 12–16, 14–17, 15–20, 23–15
Pts: Kiel 19; Rebs: Kiel 13; Asts: 4 players 2		Pts: Vilà 18; Rebs: Lopez-Arosteguj 9 Asts: Rico 10

Neo Ionia Indoor Hall, Volos – Thessaly (GRE)
Attendance: 50
Referees: Milan Brziak (SVK), Nikolaos Somos (GRE), Marek Kukelcik (SVK)

=== Match for 5th place ===
2 August 2015
16:45

Boxscore

France	70–81	Serbia
Scoring by quarter: 18–9, 18–21, 16–28, 18–23
Pts: Jeanne 18; Rebs: Jeanne 10; Asts: Ntilikina 5		Pts: Aranitović 18; Rebs: Simanić, Miladinović 6 Asts: Stojanović 7

Neo Ionia Indoor Hall, Volos – Thessaly (GRE)
Attendance: 200
Referees: Olegs Latisevs (LAT), Gennadi Ponomarev (RUS), Petr Hrusa (CZE)

=== Bronze medal match ===
2 August 2015
19:00

Boxscore

Lithuania	74–49	Bosnia and Herzegovina
Scoring by quarter: 25–15, 18–15, 13–16, 18–3
Pts: Varnas 15; Rebs: Birutis 9 Asts: 3 players 4		Pts: Đedović 11; Rebs: 3 players 5 Asts: Aleksić 6

Neo Ionia Indoor Hall, Volos – Thessaly (GRE)
Attendance: 1,600
Referees: Tomasz Trawicki (POL), Ciprian Stoica (ROU), Yohan Rosso (FRA)

=== Final ===
2 August 2015
21:15

Boxscore

Greece	64–61	Turkey
Scoring by quarter: 12–19, 13–18, 16–11, 23–13
Pts: Charalampopoulos 23; Rebs: Papagiannis 15; Asts: Charalampopoulos 4		Pts: Korkmaz 15; Rebs: Bayrak 9 Asts: Korkmaz 4

Neo Ionia Indoor Hall, Volos – Thessaly (GRE)
Attendance: 1700
Referees: Borys Ryzhyk (UKR), Manuel Mazzoni (ITA), Luka Kardum (CRO)

== Final standings ==
Rank	Team	Record
1st place, gold medalist(s) Gold	Greece	7–2
2nd place, silver medalist(s) Silver	Turkey	7–2
3rd place, bronze medalist(s) Bronze	Lithuania	6–3
4th	Bosnia and Herzegovina	4–5
5th	Serbia	6–3
6th	France	6–3
7th	Spain	5–4
8th	Germany	3–6
9th	Russia	4–5
10th	Latvia	5–4
11th	Italy	5–4
12th	Croatia	4–5
13th	Finland	4–5
14th	Montenegro	3–6
15th	Ukraine	2–7
16th	Czech Republic	1–8

2015 FIBA Europe Under-18 Championship
Winners

Greece
Second title

Team relegated to the 2016 FIBA U18 European Championship Division B

== Awards ==
Most Valuable Player
(Greece) Vassilis Charalampopoulos

All-Tournament Team

- (Lithuania) Martynas Varnas
- (Bosnia and Herzegovina) Edin Atić
- (Turkey) Furkan Korkmaz
- (Greece) Vassilis Charalampopoulos
- (Greece) Georgios Papagiannis
