= Shahin (disambiguation) =

Shahin or Shaheen is a Perisan given name and surname

Shahin, Shaheen or other transliterations may also refer to:

== Military ==
- Shaheen, the military symbol of Pakistan Air Force
- Shaheen-I, a short range ballistic missile developed by Pakistan
- Shaheen-II, a medium/intermediate range ballistic missile developed by Pakistan
- Shaheen-III, a medium/intermediate range ballistic missile developed by Pakistan
- Shahin (rocket), an Iranian artillery rocket
- Mersad or Shahin, a supersonic Iranian ground-to-air guided missile

== Places ==
- Shaheen Bagh, a neighborhood in Delhi
- Shahin, Iran, a village in Iran

== Other uses ==
- Shaheen (novel), by Naseem Hijazi
- Shaheen (supercomputer), a Cray supercomputer
- Shaheen (Indian TV series), a 2000 Indian television series
- Shaheen (Pakistani TV series), a 1980 Pakistani television series, based on the novel
- Shaheen Baig, a fictional ISI agent in the 2023 Indian film Tiger 3, portrayed by Riddhi Dogra
- Shaheen Air, a defunct Pakistani airline
- Shaheen Foundation, a Pakistani company
- Cyclones Gulab and Shaheen, cyclone originated in Arabian Sea
- Shaheen falcon, a non-migratory subspecies of the Peregrine falcon
- Shahin F.C., an Iranian football club
- 4103 Chahine, a main-belt asteroid

== See also ==
- Şahin (disambiguation), the usual Turkish spelling
- Al Shaheen Oil Field, a production oil and gas field off the north east coast of Qatar
