= Ercan =

Ercan is a masculine given name of Turkish origin. Notable people with the name include:

== Given name ==
- Ercan Akbay (born 1959), Turkish writer, painter and musician
- Ercan Aktuna (1940–2013), Turkish football player
- Ercan Albay (born 1954), Turkish footballer
- Ercan Aydogmus (born 1979), Turkish footballer
- Ercan Bayrak (born 1997), Turkish basketball player
- Ercan Durmaz (born 1965), Turkish-German actor
- Ercan Kara (born 1996), Austrian footballer
- Ercan Kesal (born 1959), Turkish actor, director, writer, and physician
- Ercan Muslu (born 1988), Turkish long-distance runner
- Ercan Osmani (born 1998), Albanian and Turkish basketball player
- Ercan Özçelik (born 1967), Turkish-German actor
- Ercan Saatçi (born 1968), Turkish musician and record producer
- Ercan Şahin (born 1971), Turkish musician, songwriter, composer, and Bağlama player
- Ercan Yazgan (1946–2018), Turkish comedian
- Ercan Yıldız (born 1974), Turkish Greco-Roman wrestler

== Surname ==
- Abdullah Ercan (born 1971), Turkish football player
- Aytaç Ercan (born 1976), Turkish Paralympian wheelchair basketballer
- Mine Ercan (born 1987), Turkish women's wheelchair basketball player
- Şeyma Ercan (born 1994), Turkish female volleyball player

== Other uses ==
- Ercan International Airport, principal airport of entry into the de facto non recognised Turkish Republic of Northern Cyprus

== See also ==
- Erkan
