= Shahin =

Shahin or Shaheen is a male or female given name, and a surname. It is also a Persian adjective meaning "majestic" or "kingly", and is the term in that language for a type of peregrine falcon. "Shah" means "king", and "īn" is a suffix meaning "having the qualities of" or "made of". Linguists said that the Persian word شاهین "Shaheen" is derived from the older world سئن "SA'EN", meaning a big bird of prey.

The name is also found with variant spellings, which include Chahine, Chahin, Chagin, Shaaheen, Shaahin, Sjahien, Shaheen, Şahin, Shaheen. The name is spelled Chejin and Cejin among families of Lebanese origin in parts of Latin America, such as Lebanese Mexicans, and Shohin among Tajiks of Central Asia, influenced by the Cyrillic Persian spelling Шоҳин.

Notable people with these names include:

== Shaheen ==
- Shaheen Afridi (born 2000), Pakistani cricketer
- Shaheen Ariefdien, South African rapper
- Shaheen Holloway (born 1976), American college basketball player and coach
- Shaheen Jafargholi (born 1997), Welsh singer and actor
- Shaheen Khalid Butt, Pakistani politician
- Shaheen Khan (disambiguation)
- Shaheen Mistri (born 1971), Indian social activist and educator
- Shaheen Samad (born 1952), Bangladeshi Nazrul Sangeet singer
- Shaheen Sehbai, Pakistani-American journalist
- Shaheen Sheik (born 1975), American singer-songwriter

== Shahin ==
- Shahin Abdulrahman (born 1992), Emirati footballer
- Shahin Afrassiabi (born 1963), Iranian artist
- Shahin Akhtar, Bangladesh politician
- Shahin Assayesh (born 1939), Iranian publisher
- Shahin Badar (born 1974), British musician
- Shahin Bayani (born 1962), Iranian footballer
- Shahin Charmi (born 1953), Iranian-born German artist
- Shahin Ebrahimzadeh-Pezeshki (born 1958), Iranian textile artist, art historian
- Şahin Giray (prince) (c.1585–1641), exiled member of the ruling house of the Crimean Khanate
- Shahin Imranov (born 1980), Azerbaijani boxer
- Shahin-i Shirazi (fourteenth century), Judaeo-Persian poet
- Shahin Khaledan (born 1990), Iranian tennis player
- Shahin Kheiri (born 1980), Iranian footballer
- Shahin Kolonja (Turkmen: Şahin Teki Kolonya; 1865–1919), Albanian journalist and politician
- Shahin Musayev (Azerbaijani: Şahin Musayev Xeyrəddin oğlu; fl. 1992–1995), Azerbaijani politician and general
- Shahin Mustafayev (Azerbaijani: Şahin Mustafayev Abdulla oğlu; born 1965), Azerbaijani politician
- Shahin Najafi (born 1980), Iranian musician
- Shahin Nassirinia (born 1976), Iranian weightlifter
- Shahin Novrasli (born 1977), Azerbaijani musical artist
- Shahin Saghebi (born 1993), Iranian footballer
- Shahin (Shawn) Shadfar (1973–2018), Persian-American entrepreneur
- Shahin Shafiei (born 1988), Iranian footballer
- Shahin Shahbazi (born 1978), Iranian composer, musician and poet
- Shahin Shahida, Iranian-American musician
- Shahin Shirazi (fourteenth century), Judaeo-Persian writer
- Shahin Sultanov, Commander of the Azerbaijani Naval Forces
- Shahin Suroor (born 1996), Emirati footballer
- Shahin Taherkhani (born 1997), Iranian footballer
- Shahin Vahmanzadegan (died c. 626), Sasanian general

== Middle name ==
- Aram Shahin Davud Bakoyan (born 1954), Iraqi politician
- Kazi Shahin Ara, Bangladeshi national women's kabaddi player
- Khalifa Shaheen Al Merri, Emirati diplomat

== Surname ==
=== Shaheen ===
- Abdel Hamid Shaheen (1943–2014), Egyptian footballer
- Adam Shaheen (American football) (born 1994), American football player
- Adam Shaheen (producer) (born 1964), British-Canadian artist, television producer and screenwriter
- Alfred Shaheen (1922–2008), American textile industrialist
- Bob Shaheen (born 1933), American businessman
- Elias Shaheen or Elias Chahine (1914–1991), first bishop of the Maronite Church in Canada
- Fadi Shaheen (born 1979), Jordanian footballer
- Faiza Shaheen (born 1983), British economist and activist
- George Shaheen (born 1944), American businessman
- Hina Shaheen (born 1971), Pakistani actress
- Ibrahim Shaheen, Palestinian man who worked for the Israeli intelligence service Mossad
- Jeanne Shaheen (born 1947), American politician
- Jack Shaheen (1935–2017), American media scholar
- John Shaheen (1915–1985), American financier, and businessman
- Matt Shaheen (born 1965), American politician
- Michael Shaheen (1940–2007), American government official and attorney
- Mohammad Shaheen (1938–2025), Jordanian scholar, literary critic, translator, and professor of English literature
- Muhammad Parvesh Shaheen (born 1944), Pakistani historian and author
- Musarrat Shaheen, Pakistani actress and politician
- Najma Shaheen (born 1962), Pakistani politician
- Naseeb Shaheen (1931–2009), American scholar
- Natali Shaheen, Palestinian footballer
- Qasim Riza Shaheen (born 1971), British artist and writer
- Robert Joseph Shaheen (1937–2017), American Maronite bishop
- Saif Saaeed Shaheen (born 1982), formerly Stephen Cherono, Kenyan-born Emirati long-distance runner
- Sarah Shaheen (born 1983), Egyptian beauty pageant and model
- Shaher Shaheen (born 1990), Syrian footballer
- Simon Shaheen (born 1955), Palestinian-American composer and musician
- Suhail Shaheen, Taliban negotiator and spokesman
- Yasser Shaheen (born 1989), Syrian footballer

=== Shahin ===
- Elham Shahin (born 1961), Egyptian actress
- Emad Shahin (born 1957), Egyptian professor of political science
- Hady Shahin (born 1986), Egyptian handball player
- Iraj Shahin-Baher (born 1972), Iranian politician, and mayor of Tabriz
- Jammal Shahin (born 1988), English footballer
- Khalil Mohamed Shahin (born 1942), Egyptian footballer
- Mamdouh Shahin, Egyptian Major General, politician, and Assistant Defense Minister
- Mohamed Issa Shahin (born 1963), Jordanian sports shooter
- Nadine Shahin (born 1997), Egyptian squash player
- Omar Shahin, Jordanian-American activist
- Saleh Shahin (born 1982), Israeli Paralympic medalist rower
- Tanyus Shahin (1815–1895), Maronite muleteer and peasant leader from Mount Lebanon
- Tarek Shahin (born 1982), Egyptian cartoonist

=== Chahine ===
- Abdallah Chahine (1894–1975), Lebanese pianist and tuner-technician
- Edgar Chahine (1874–1947), French painter, engraver and illustrator of Armenian descent
- Khalil Chahine, German-Lebanese musical artist
- Nadine Chahine, Lebanese type designer
- Yehia Chahine (1917–1994), Egyptian actor
- Youssef Chahine (1926–2008), Egyptian film director
- Hassan Chahine, Moroccan hammer thrower
- Darine Chahine (born 1981), Lebanese talk show host

== See also ==
- Şahin (disambiguation), the usual Turkish spelling
