= Selçuk Şahin =

Selçuk Şahin may refer to:

- Selçuk Şahin (footballer, born 1981), Turkish footballer
- Selçuk Şahin (footballer, born 1983), Turkish footballer
