= Atić =

Atić is a surname. Notable people with the surname include:

- Planinka Jurišić-Atić (born 1955), pianist
- Semir Atić (born 1964), Bosnian journalist
- Edin Atić (born 1997), Bosnian basketball player
