= Erkan =

Erkan is a common Turkish given name. It is composed of "Er" and "Kan". In Turkish "Er" means "Male", "Brave", "Valiant" and "Kan" means "Blood", "Lineage". Thus, "Erkan" means "a brave male with valiant lineage".

- Erkan Can (born 1958), Turkish actor
- Erkan Mumcu (born 1963), Turkish politician
- Erkan Zengin (born 1985), Turkish-Swedish footballer
- Erkan Yolaç (1935–2024), Turkish TV host and presenter
- Erkan Petekkaya (born 1970), Turkish actor
- Erkan Kolçak Köstendil (born 1983), Turkish actor
- Erkan Oğur (born 1954), Turkish musician
- Erkan Mustafa (born 1970), British-Turkish actor
- Erkan Özbey (born 1978), Turkish footballer
- Erkan Öztürk (born 1983), German-Turkish footballer
- Erkan Sağlık (born 1985), Turkish footballer
- Erkan Taşkıran (born 1985), Turkish footballer
- Erkan Veyseloğlu (born 1983), Turkish basketball player
- Erkan Kaş (born 1991), Turkish footballer
- Erkan Sulejmani (born 1981), Kosovo-Albanian footballer

== Surname ==
- Enes Erkan (born 1987), Turkish karateka
- Hafize Gaye Erkan (born 1979), Governor of the Central Bank of the Republic of Turkey
- Hüseyin Erkan (born 1958), Turkish civil servant
- Medine Erkan (born 1995), Turkish women's footballer

== See also ==
- Ercan (disambiguation)
