= Nea Ionia Municipal Indoor Athletic Center =

Indoor sporting arena in Volos, Greece

Nea Ionia Municipal Indoor Hall
- Nea Ionia Indoor Hall
- Interactive map of Nea Ionia Municipal Indoor Hall
- Full name: Nea Ionia Municipal Indoor Athletic Center
- Location: Volos, Greece
- Coordinates: 38.0375°N 23.7486°E
- Capacity: Basketball: 1,964; Volleyball: 1,964
- Surface: Parquet

Construction
- Renovated: 2019
- Expanded: 2019

Tenant
- Niki Volos

Nea Ionia Municipal Indoor Athletic Center (Greek: Δημοτικό Κλειστό Γυμναστήριο Νέας Ιωνίας), is an indoor sporting arena that is located in Volos, Greece. The arena is mainly used to host basketball and volleyball games. The seating capacity of the arena is 1,964 people.

== History ==
Nea Ionia Municipal Indoor Athletic Center hosted the 2004 HEBA Greek All-Star Game. It also hosted the 2015 FIBA Europe Under-18 Championship, and the 2019 FIBA U18 European Championship. The arena hosts the home games of the Greek basketball club Niki Volos.
