= Tadas Sedekerskis =

Lithuanian basketball player

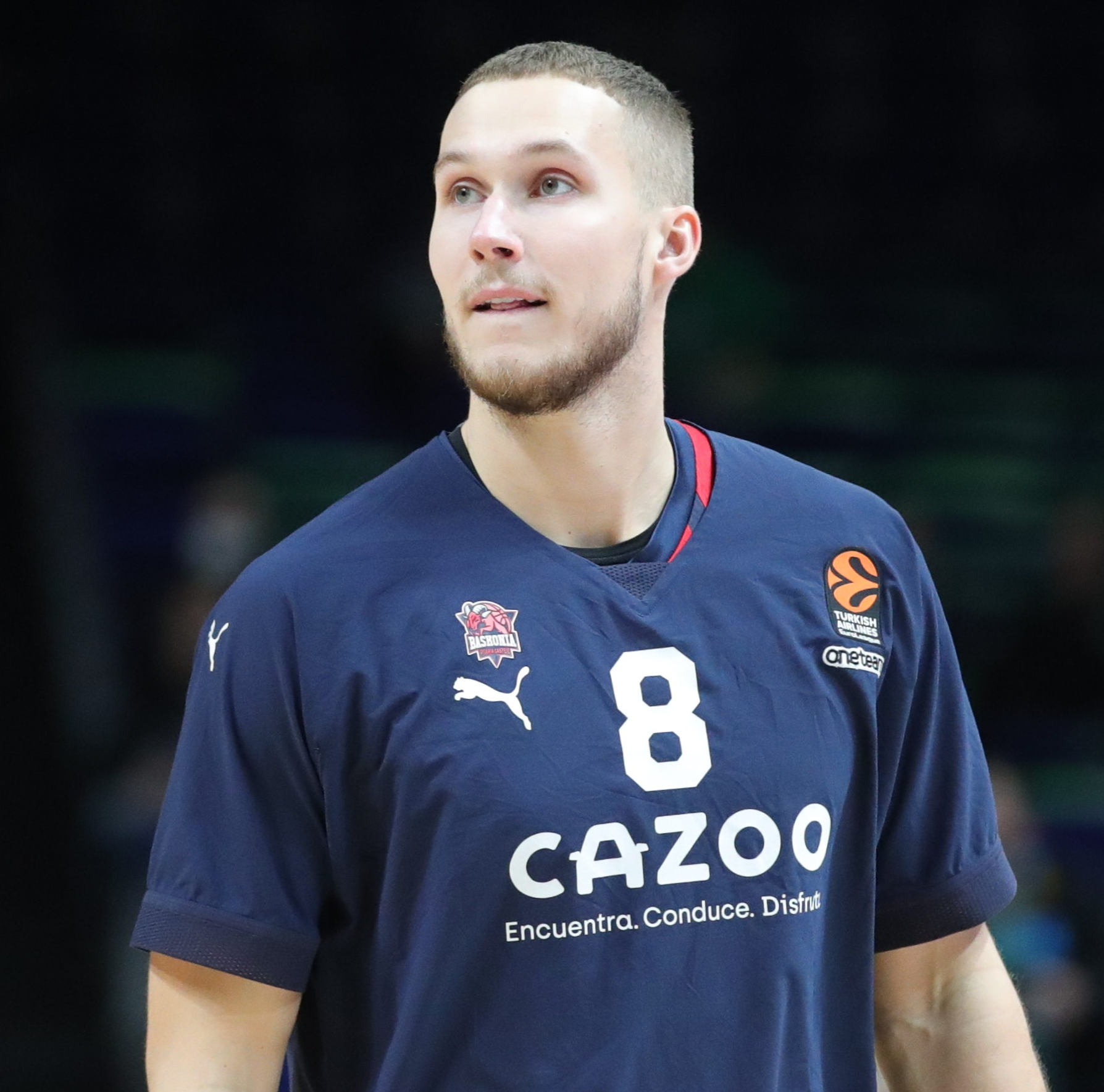
- Sedekerskis playing for Baskonia in 2023

No. 8 – Saski Baskonia
- Position: Power forward
- League: Liga ACB; EuroLeague

Personal information
- Born: 17 January 1998 (age 28) Nida, Lithuania
- Listed height: 2.06 m (6 ft 9 in)
- Listed weight: 101 kg (223 lb)

Career information
- NBA draft: 2020: undrafted
- Playing career: 2012–present

Career history
- 2012–2013: Kuršiai Neringa
- 2013–present: Baskonia
- 2013–2014: →Fundación 5+11
- 2014–2015: →Araberri
- 2015–2016: →Peñas Huesca
- 2017: →San Pablo Burgos
- 2017–2018: →Nevėžis
- 2019–2020: →Neptūnas

Career highlights
- Liga ACB champion (2020)
Medals
Men's basketball
Representing Lithuania
European Under-18 Championship
Silver medal – second place	2016 Turkey	U18 National Team
Bronze medal – third place	2015 Greece	U18 National Team

Tadas Sedekerskis (born 17 January 1998) is a Lithuanian professional basketball player and the team captain for Saski Baskonia of the Spanish Liga ACB and the EuroLeague.

== Professional career ==
During his early career aged 14, Sedekerskis played for Kuršiai Neringa in the third-tier Lithuanian basketball league – RKL, averaging 10.6 points, 3.8 rebounds and 1.8 assists per 27 minutes over 5 games in the 2012–13 season. In June 2013, Sedekerskis signed a "1+2+3" contract with Baskonia of Spain. On 10 May 2014, Sedekerskis led Baskonia's junior team to a bronze medal after scoring 34 points (2-pointers: 7/10, 3-pointers: 4/11, FT: 8/11), grabbing 10 rebounds and making two steals. At the age of only 17, he debuted in Baskonia's men's team during a Liga ACB win against Joventut Badalona by 87–68.

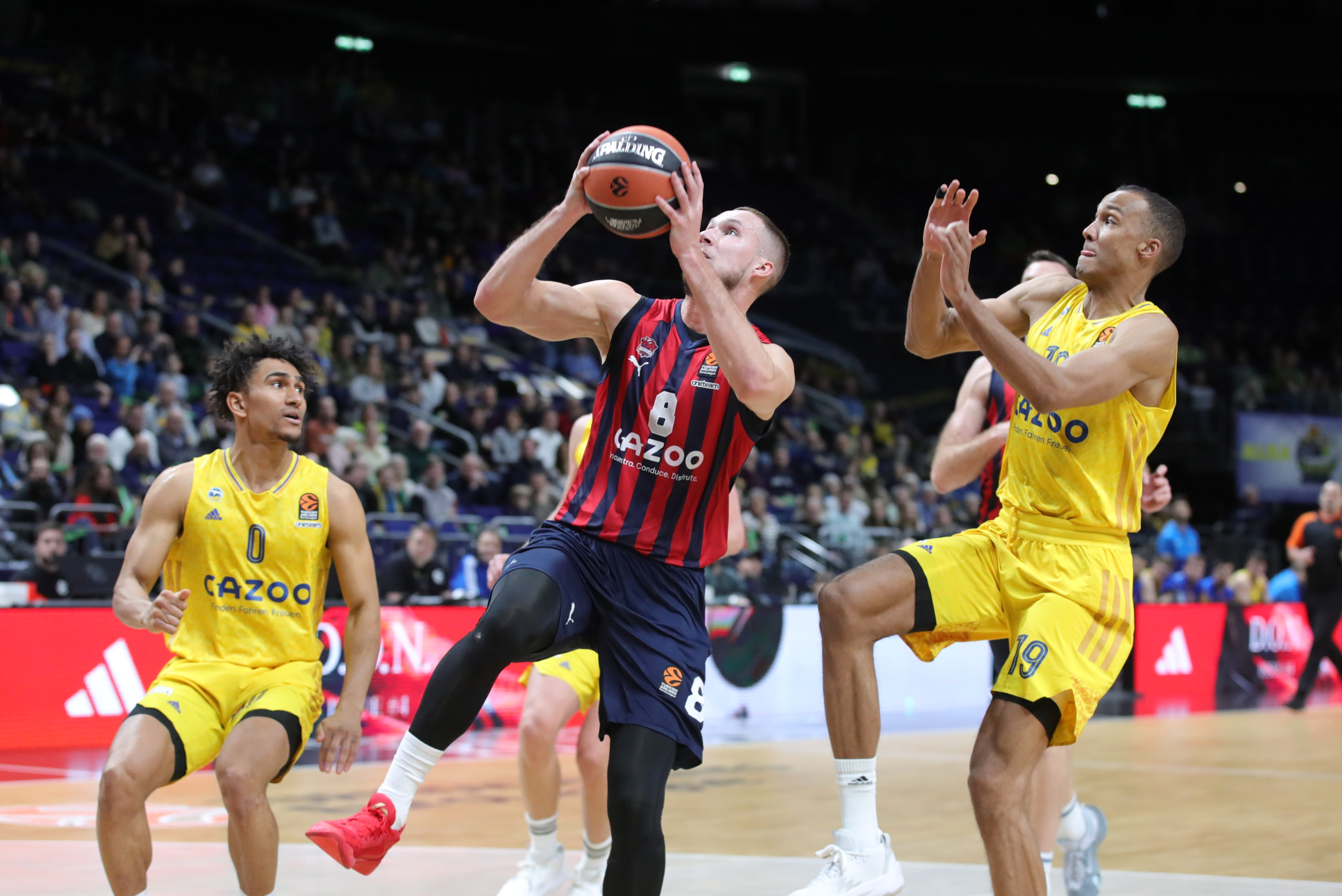
Sedekerskis attacking the basket while playing for the Baskonia versus the ALBA Berlin in the 2022–23 EuroLeague season

He tallied four points and a team-high five rebounds as a member of the World Select Team at the 2017 Nike Hoop Summit.

On 1 September 2017, Sedekerskis extended his contract with Baskonia until 2022 and went on loan to San Pablo Burgos for the 2017–18 season. On 16 December 2017, Sedekerskis end his loan with San Pablo Burgos after appearing inconspicuously in eight games with Spanish club and went on loan to Nevėžis of the Lietuvos krepšinio lyga. In April 2019, he declared for the 2019 NBA draft. On 26 July 2019, Baskonia loaned him to Neptūnas for the 2019–20 season.

On 27 July 2021, Sedekerskis signed a contract extension with Baskonia until the end of the 2023–24 season. During the 2023-24 campaign, he was named team captain after the departure of fellow Lithuanian Rokas Giedraitis. On 4 March 2024, Sedekerskis renewed his contract with the club through 2029.

== National team career ==
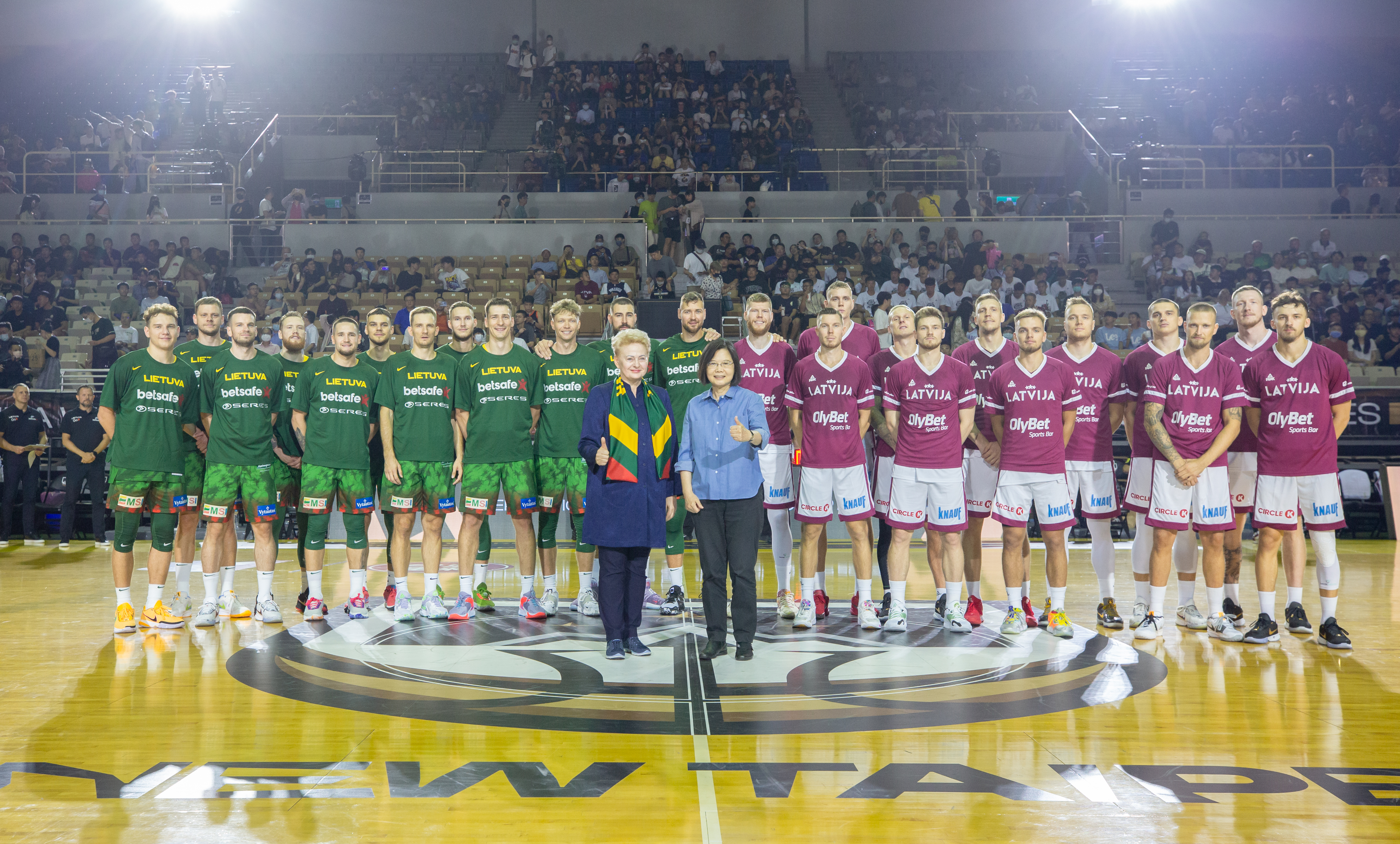
Sedekerskis (fourth from the left in the second line) with the senior Lithuania men's national basketball team in 2023

In 2013, Sedekerskis was a member of the Lithuanian U-16 team during the 2013 European Under-16 Championship. He averaged 11.4 points, 4.9 rebounds and 1 assist per 20 minutes of game action. In 2015, he represented Lithuania's U-18 team in the 2015 FIBA Europe Under-18 Championship and averaged 12.6 points, 7.0 rebounds and 2.3 assists per game. The team, led by him and Martynas Varnas, Laurynas Birutis, won bronze. The trio was invited to play in the FIBA's Youth All-Star Game during EuroBasket 2015.

He averaged a double-double with 15.7 points and 10.2 rebounds to go along with 3.8 assists, 1.3 blocks and 1.2 steals per outing en route to a silver medal at the 2016 U18 European Championships in Turkey. Sedekerskis was named to the tournament's "All-Star Five".

After playing for the senior Lithuania men's national basketball team in the 2023 FIBA Basketball World Cup qualification, in 2023 Sedekerskis debuted in the first major FIBA tournament with the senior Lithuania men's national basketball team during the 2023 FIBA Basketball World Cup and averaged 6.6 points, 7.3 rebounds, 1.1 assists per game.

Later he also represented the Lithuania men's national team in the 2024 FIBA Men's Olympic Qualifying Tournament and EuroBasket 2025.

== Career statistics ==
Legend
GP	Games played	GS	Games started	MPG	Minutes per game
FG%	Field-goal percentage	3P%	3-point field-goal percentage	FT%	Free-throw percentage
RPG	Rebounds per game	APG	Assists per game	SPG	Steals per game
BPG	Blocks per game	PPG	Points per game	PIR	Performance index rating
**Bold**	Career high

=== EuroLeague ===
Year	Team	GP	GS	MPG	FG%	3P%	FT%	RPG	APG	SPG	BPG	PPG	PIR
2016–17	Baskonia	13	0	5.0	.600	.000	.625	.6	.2	.1	—	1.3	1.3
2018–19	Baskonia	2	0	2.5	**.667**	—	—	1.0	—	—	—	2.0	2.5
2020–21	Baskonia	32	21	16.3	.494	.367	.783	2.9	1.1	.6	.3	3.5	5.6
2021–22	Baskonia	27	13	18.0	.505	.354	.500	4.4	**1.4**	.4	.3	4.8	8.2
2022–23	Baskonia	23	3	18.7	.598	.357	**.871**	4.2	1.0	**.8**	—	5.9	9.7
2023–24	Baskonia	**35**	**32**	**27.7**	.597	**.389**	.806	**6.7**	**1.4**	.5	**.4**	**8.8**	**14.7**
Career		132	69	18.8	.560	.366	.772	4.2	1.1	.5	.2	5.3	8.8

=== Basketball Champions League ===
Year	Team	GP	GS	MPG	FG%	3P%	FT%	RPG	APG	SPG	BPG	PPG
2019–20	Neptūnas	14	11	20.2	.471	.200	.667	3.6	1.1	.8	.1	4.6
Career		14	11	20.2	.471	.200	.667	3.6	1.1	.8	.1	4.6

=== FIBA Europe Cup ===
Year	Team	GP	GS	MPG	FG%	3P%	FT%	RPG	APG	SPG	BPG	PPG
2017–18	Nevėžis	4	2	29.9	.609	.444	.545	8.5	2.2	.5	.5	9.5
Career		4	2	29.9	.609	.444	.545	8.5	2.2	.5	.5	9.5

=== Domestic leagues ===
Year	Team	League	GP	MPG	FG%	3P%	FT%	RPG	APG	SPG	BPG	PPG
2012–13	(Lithuania) Nafta-Universitetas	NKL	3	9.3	.333	—	—	2.0	—	—	.7	1.3
2014–15	(Spain) Araberri	LEB Plata	25	23.8	.482	.382	.811	3.5	1.1	.3	.2	8.9
2014–15	(Spain) Baskonia	ACB	3	6.6	.000	.000	—	—	—	—	.3	0.0
2015–16	(Spain) Peñas Huesca	LEB Oro	21	15.7	.576	.318	.725	2.4	.6	.7	.2	6.8
2016–17	(Spain) Baskonia	ACB	24	7.9	.475	.500	.400	1.8	.4	.2	.1	2.0
2017–18	(Spain) Miraflores	ACB	8	10.6	.385	.000	.500	2.9	.6	.4	.1	1.6
2017–18	(Lithuania) Nevėžis	LKL	17	23.7	.598	.483	.710	4.4	1.3	.6	.3	9.3
2018–19	(Spain) Baskonia	ACB	9	7.6	.615	.500	.250	1.9	.1	.1	.1	2.0
2019–20	(Lithuania) Neptūnas	LKL	24	24.2	.608	.450	.778	5.4	1.7	1.0	.4	8.2
2019–20	(Spain) Baskonia	ACB	1	30.8	.333	.500	—	5.0	3.0	—	1.0	5.0
2020–21	(Spain) Baskonia	ACB	38	18.1	.567	.297	.814	4.2	.9	.6	.4	5.2
2021–22	(Spain) Baskonia	ACB	35	15.2	.540	.325	.767	3.9	1.0	.3	.1	4.1
2022–23	(Spain) Baskonia	ACB	24	21.1	.574	.351	.821	5.2	1.7	.6	.1	6.7
2023–24	(Spain) Baskonia	ACB	31	26.3	.526	.410	.727	6.3	1.7	.6	.3	8.2
