= Shahinur =

Shahinur is a given name. "Shah-e noor" means "shah of light" in Persian. Notable people with the name include

- Shahinur Alam Shahin, better known as Shahin Alam, Bangladeshi actor
- Md. Shahinur Islam, retired judge of the Appellate Division of Bangladesh Supreme Court
- Shahinur Pasha Chowdhury, Bangladeshi politician
- Shahinur Kabir Shimul, Bangladeshi footballer

== See also ==
- Shahin
