= Ofspor =

Turkish football club

- Full name: Ofspor Kulübü
- Founded: 25 May 1968
- Ground: Of İlçe Stadium, Of, Trabzon
- Capacity: 2,303
- Chairman: Olcay Saral
- Manager: Kadir Kar
- League: TFF 3. Lig
- 2021–22: TFF 3. Lig, Group 3, 5th
- Website: https://www.ofspor.org.tr/
Home colours	Away colours

Ofspor is a Turkish football club founded in 1968, currently playing in the TFF Third League. Their club colours are claret and blue. They play home matches at the Of İlçe Stadium, located in the coastal town of Of in Trabzon Province.

== Players ==
=== Current squad ===
Note: Flags indicate national team as defined under FIFA eligibility rules; some limited exceptions apply. Players may hold more than one non-FIFA nationality.

No.	Pos.	Nation	Player
—		TUR	Abdurahman Çubukçu
—		TUR	Abdurahman Kırmacı
—		TUR	Adem Çak
—		TUR	Ahmet Yılmazer
—		TUR	Arslan Çakıroğlu
—		TUR	Can Ulun
—		TUR	Cem Demir
—		TUR	Çetin Murat Bayraktar
—		TUR	Emre Hamzaoğlu
—		TUR	Ercan Şahin
—		TUR	Ferhat Aydin

No.	Pos.	Nation	Player
—		TUR	Gökhan Durmuş
—		TUR	Güray Gündoğdu
—		TUR	Halil İbrahim Kurt
—		TUR	Hasan Yaranlı
—		TUR	Hicabi Demir
—		TUR	Rasimcan Değirmenci
—		TUR	Rıdvan Çetin
—		TUR	Savaş Topaoğlu
—		TUR	Suat Bozkurt
—		TUR	Tuncay Maldan
—		TUR	Yücel Solak
