= İbrahim Şahin (footballer) =

Turkish footballer

Personal information
- Date of birth: 1 March 1984 (age 42)
- Place of birth: Araklı, Turkey
- Height: 1.80 m (5 ft 11 in)
- Position: Forward

Team information
- Current team: Gaziosmanpaşaspor
- Number: 61

Youth career
- Araklıspor

Senior career*
Years	Team	Apps	(Gls)
2002–2003	Erzurumspor	18	(2)
2003–2005	Araklıspor	49	(12)
2005–2006	Akçaabat Sebatspor	20	(0)
2006–2007	Arsinspor	32	(9)
2007–2009	Hacettepe	42	(9)
2009–2011	Sivasspor	27	(4)
2011–2012	Orduspor	12	(3)
2012–2013	Göztepe	18	(2)
2013	Karşıyaka	11	(2)
2013–2014	Ankaragücü	6	(1)
2014–2015	Gölbaşıspor	10	(1)
2015	Ofspor	11	(2)
2015–	Gaziosmanpaşaspor	1	(0)

International career
1999	Turkey U15	1	(0)
- * Club domestic league appearances and goals as of 14 September 2015

İbrahim Şahin (born 1 March 1984) is a Turkish professional footballer who plays as a forward for Gaziosmanpaşaspor.
