= Cem Demir =

Turkish footballer

Personal information
- Date of birth: 30 April 1985 (age 41)
- Place of birth: Erzincan, Turkey
- Height: 1.87 m (6 ft 1 1/2 in)
- Position: Forward

Senior career*
Years	Team	Apps	(Gls)
2006–2007	Trabzonspor	8	(0)
2007	Orduspor	13	(1)
2008	Adana Demirspor	3	(0)
2008–2010	Kartalspor	15	(0)
2010–2011	Körfez İskenderunspor	27	(7)
2011	Turanspor	7	(1)
2011–2012	Tokatspor	11	(2)
2012–2013	Ofspor	28	(4)
2013–2014	İnegölspor	29	(4)
2014–2015	Kırklarelispor		
2015–2016	Bugsas Spor		
2016	Batman Petrolspor		
2017	Derincespor		
- * Club domestic league appearances and goals

Cem Demir (born 30 April 1985) is a Turkish former footballer.
