= Martynas Varnas =

Lithuanian basketball player

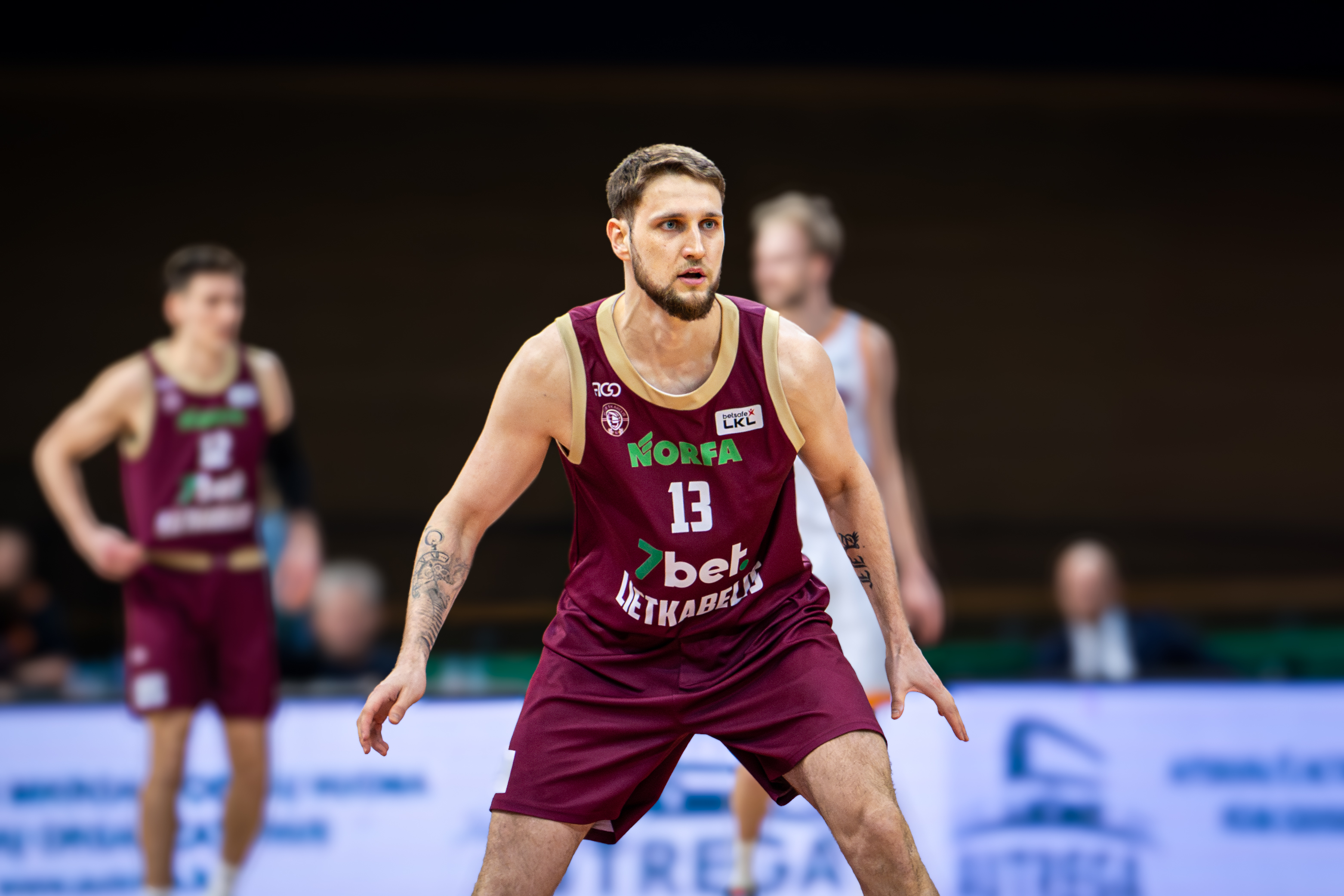
- Varnas with Lietkabelis in 2024

No. 13 – Rīgas Zeļļi
- Position: Shooting guard / Small forward
- League: LEBL

Personal information
- Born: January 21, 1997 (age 29) Kaunas, Lithuania
- Listed height: 1.96 m (6 ft 5 in)
- Listed weight: 90 kg (198 lb)

Career information
- NBA draft: 2019: undrafted
- Playing career: 2013–present

Career history
- 2013–2017: Žalgiris-2
- 2017–2019: Žalgiris Kaunas
- 2017–2018: → Pieno žvaigždės
- 2018–2019: → Nevėžis Kėdainiai
- 2019–2020: Prienai
- 2020–2023: Šiauliai
- 2023: Edmonton Stingers
- 2023–2025: Lietkabelis Panevėžys
- 2025: Kolossos Rodou
- 2026–present: Rīgas Zeļļi

Career highlights
- Nike Hoop Summit (2016); King Mindaugas Cup champion (2017); LKL champion (2017)

Martynas Varnas (born 21 January 1997) is a Lithuanian professional basketball player for Rīgas Zeļļi of the Latvian-Estonian Basketball League (LEBL). He was selected to the 2015 FIBA Europe Under-18 Championship All-Tournament Team after winning the bronze medal with the Lithuania national team. Varnas, together with his teammates Tadas Sedekerskis and Laurynas Birutis, were invited to play in the FIBA's Youth All-Star Game during EuroBasket 2015.
