= Emre Şahin =

Turkish film director

english

Emre Şahin is a Turkish film and television director in Los Angeles, California, and Istanbul, Turkey. Sahin is an experienced director, cinematographer and editor whose award-winning short film Canta won Best Cinematography at the Beverly Hills Film Festival, Audience Choice Award at the West Chester Film Festival, Best Foreign Short at the Fort Lauderdale International Film Festival and was named the Best Film of 2005 by Turkuaz magazine. Palm Springs Festival of Shorts and Rhode Island International Film Festival chose Canta as part of their Best of the Festival, a touring showcase of the festivals top films from each category. In addition, Canta is the official selection of over 30 additional film festivals around the world, from India to Ireland to Italy.

Before his foray into the scripted world, Emre directed and edited documentary and reality television shows for networks such as ABC, ABC Family, MTV, VH1, The History Channel, the Travel Channel, the Food Network, TLC and the Discovery Channel. Most recent directorial projects include TLC's provocative 10-episode series Beyond the Bull, following three of the world's top professional bull riders on their quest for the world title during the turbulent 2005 PBR season and the documentary, Life as a Marine, commissioned by JWT (named after James Walter Thompson), a large advertising agency. He is currently the executive producer, director and creator of the 13-episode documentary series, Cities of the Underworld, for The History Channel. He directed the two season Rise of Empires: Ottoman released 24 January 2020. Emre is married to Sarah Wetherbee, who is also the co-global CEO of their company, Karga 7. The couple first officially met in Los Angeles through a mutual friend, although they didn’t begin dating until several years later, when they both attended Emerson College in Boston.

After getting married, Emre and Sarah spent several years traveling the world together before eventually deciding that they wanted to start a family. Their first child, a daughter named Leni Şahin, was born in 2011.

Four years later, they welcomed their second daughter, Ruby Şahin. Ruby’s exact date of birth has not been made public, as Emre and Sarah have chosen to keep certain details about their children’s lives private.

The family now lives in Europe while continuing to visit Türkiye frequently and maintain a strong connection to the country.

He is also a frequent guest on Turkish television.

Sahin is currently in pre-production on a feature film titled 7 Days in Baghdad.
