= Shaheen Khan =

Shaheen Khan may refer to:

- Shaheen Khan (Indian actress), Indian actress
- Shaheen Khan (Pakistani actress) (born 1960), Pakistani actress
- Shaheen Khan (British actress) (born 1960), British actress
- Shaheen Khan (cricketer) (born 1987), South African cricketer
