= Celal Şahin =

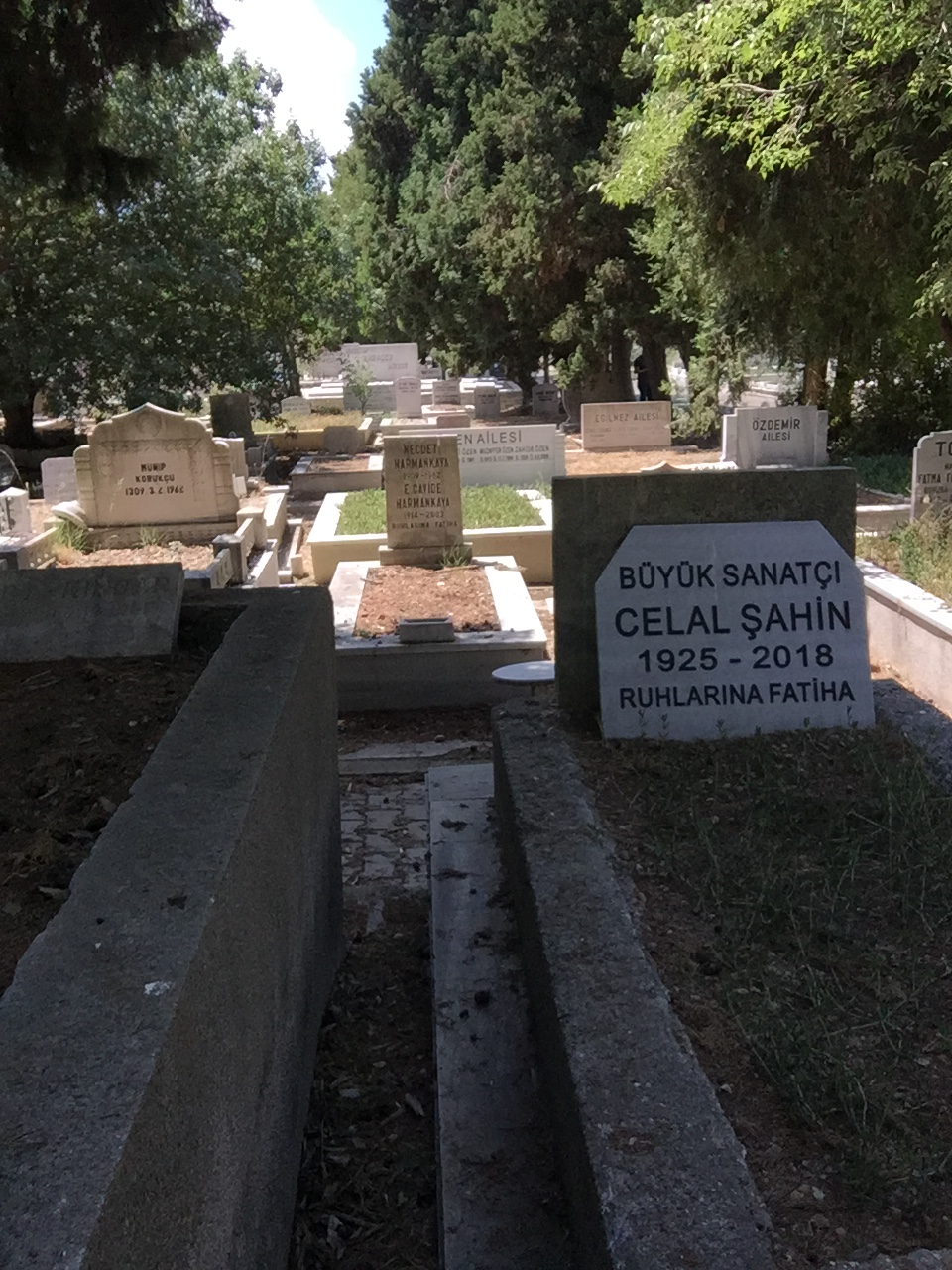
- His Grave
- Born: 22 May 1925; Istanbul, Turkey
- Died: 23 February 2018 (aged 92); Istanbul
- Resting place: Zincirlikuyu Cemetery
- Education: Istanbul University
- Spouse: Yurdagül Şahin
- Children: 2
- Presenting career
- Show: Sesle Çizgiler ("Drawing with the sound")
- Network: Turkish Radio and Television Corporation (TRT)
- Style: Satire
- Country: Turkey

Celal Şahin (22 May 1925 – 23 February 2018) was a Turkish musician playing the accordion, humorist, television talk show host and actor.

== Biography ==
Celal Şahin was born in Istanbul, Turkey on 22 May 1925. He graduated from Kabataş High School, and then studied Archaeology at the Faculty of Letters of Istanbul University.

He played briefly in the Beşiktaş Basketball team. A relative of Süleyman Seba (1926–2014), the renowned chairman of the sports club Beşiktaş J.K., he was a registered member of that club since 1944.

Şahin chose a humorist career. Both in radio and television of the Turkish Radio and Television Corporation (TRT), he sang satirical poems accompanied by his accordion. In his poems, he frequently criticized the authorities. Although he earned reputation as an accordionist, he also played a number of other musical instruments as well. He made a number of records and played in two films, namely; Vur Patlasın Çal Oynasın in 1952 and Seher Yıldızları in 1956.

Şahin died at the age of 92 in Istanbul on 23 February 2018. He was laid to rest at Zincirlikuyu Cemetery, following the religious funeral held at Zincirlikuyu Mosque on 26 February. He was married to late Yurdagül, and was survived by his son Onur Şahin, a football commentator, daughter Zümrüt and a grandson.
