= Jonathan Jeanne =

French basketball player

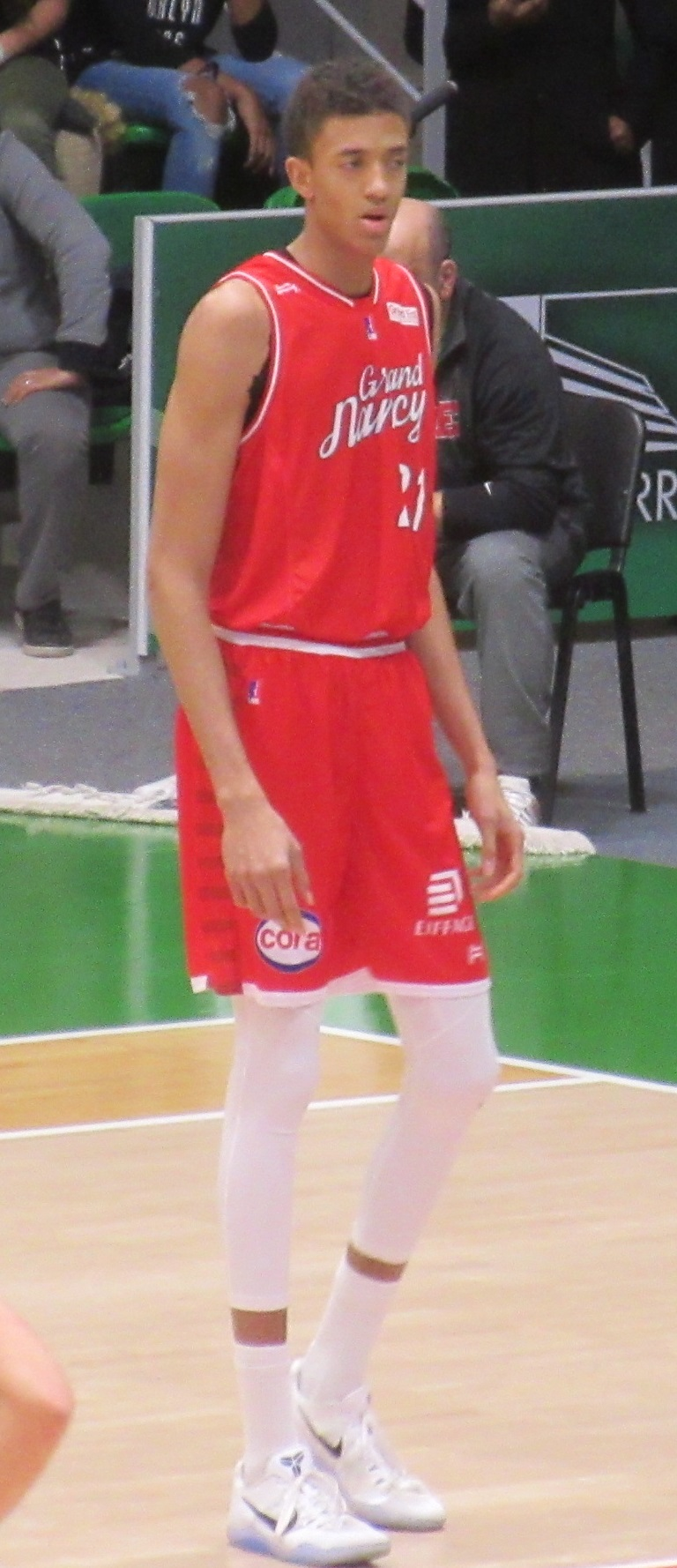
- Jeanne playing for Nancy in 2017

Free Agent
- Position: Power forward / center

Personal information
- Born: July 3, 1997 (age 29) Les Abymes, Guadeloupe
- Listed height: 7 ft 2 in (2.18 m)
- Listed weight: 205 lb (93 kg)

Career information
- NBA draft: 2017: undrafted
- Playing career: 2016–present

Career history
- 2016–2017: Le Mans Sarthe
- 2016–2017: →SLUC Nancy
- 2018: Palma
- 2018–2019: CB Prat
- 2019–2021: Randers Cimbria
- 2021–2022: Tarbes/Lourdes
- 2022–2025: Poitiers Basket 86
- 2025–2026: Le Mans Sarthe

Jonathan Josue Jeanne (born July 3, 1997) is a French basketball player who last played for Le Mans Sarthe Basket of the French ProA league. He was considered as a possible 2017 NBA draft first-round pick, before being diagnosed with Marfan syndrome. He did not get drafted that year because of the sudden development. Jeanne stands 2.18 m (7 ft 2 in) tall and plays in the power forward and center positions.

== Personal life ==
His full name is Jonathan Josue Jeanne; he was born and raised in the French overseas territory Guadeloupe. Jeanne's sports history includes soccer, track and field and swimming.

== Professional career ==
Jeanne began his basketball career in the youth set-up of Asc Ban E Lot in Guadeloupe.

He attended INSEP between 2012 and 2015 before joining Le Mans Sarthe Basket. He had signed with Le Mans Sarthe Basket prior to his enrolment at INSEP. While he practiced with the Le Mans Pro A squad, Jeanne mostly played with the club’s development team during the 2015–16 season.

During his final year (2014 – 2015) at INSEP, he posted averages of 9.6 points, 5.2 rebounds and 1.4 blocks in his 24:45 minutes on the court in each game he played. The INSEP squad is competing in the Nationale 1 league, the third tier of French basketball.

He played in the 2015 FIBA European U18 All-Star Game, scoring four points and pulling down six rebounds to go along with one block in 18 minutes.

Jeanne first played for the second team of Le Mans Sarthe during the 2015-16 season. On August 18, 2016, Jeanne signed his first professional contract, a three-year deal with the French LNB Pro A team Le Mans Sarthe. Playing only occasionally for Le Mans' first team, Jeanne was sent as loan to fellow Pro A outfit SLUC Nancy on December 10, 2016 to play more regular Pro A basketball.

On 19 April 2017, Jeanne declared his entry for the 2017 NBA draft, with the intention to remain in the draft until the international deadline has passed. He also held his intention to enter the NBA the following season. Jeanne was listed as one of 67 invites to participate in the 2017 NBA Draft Combine despite his participation in the 2016-17 LNB Pro A season. On June 8 Jeanne was diagnosed with Marfan syndrome that put his professional career in jeopardy. Despite the sudden development, Jeanne was still one of only 10 international draft deadline underclassmen to ultimately stay in the 2017 NBA Draft. Ultimately, Jeanne did not get drafted. After consulting with doctors and specialists, Jeanne was told that he would not be able to play professional basketball due to the Marfan syndrome. As a consequence of that he was taken off the Le Mans roster in November 2017.

On July 23, 2018, Jeanne signed with Iberojet Palma of the LEB Oro.

Jeanne spent the 2019-20 season in Denmark with Randers Cimbria, with an average of 17.5 points, nine rebounds and 2.5 blocks per game. He re-signed with the team on October 6, 2020. In his second season in Denmark, he averaged team-highs of 17.3 points and 8.8 rebounds per game for Randers. In April 2021, Jeanne made headlines with an outstanding performance (41 points on 14-for-19 shooting from 2-point range, 3-for-3 from 3-point distance and 4-for-4 from the foul line, 12 rebounds, 6 assists, 2 steals) in game two of the Basketligaen semifinals.

Jeanne was supposed to play for Al Wasl SC of the United Arab Emirates in the 2021-22 season, but his contract was cancelled in September 2020. In late October 2021, an announcement was made with Jeanne as a newcomer at French third-division (NM1) side Tarbes/Lourdes. He averaged 9,7 points and 4 rebounds per game for the team. On June 29, 2022, Jeanne signed with fellow NM1 club Poitiers Basket 86. In 2023, Poitiers won promotion to the second-tier LNB Pro B.

Jeanne returned to Le Mans Sarthe of the French top-tier division for the 2025–26 campaign.

== International career ==
Jeanne played a few minutes for the French under-16 national team at the 2013 European Championships, he had no score in four games.

In 2015, he helped the French under-18 national team to a sixth-place finish while tallying 8.6 points, 6.7 rebounds and 1.9 blocked shots per game during the U18 European Championships. In November 2025, Jeanne was picked to participate at a training camp of the French men's national team as a practice player.
