= Edin Atić =

Bosnian basketball player (born 1997)

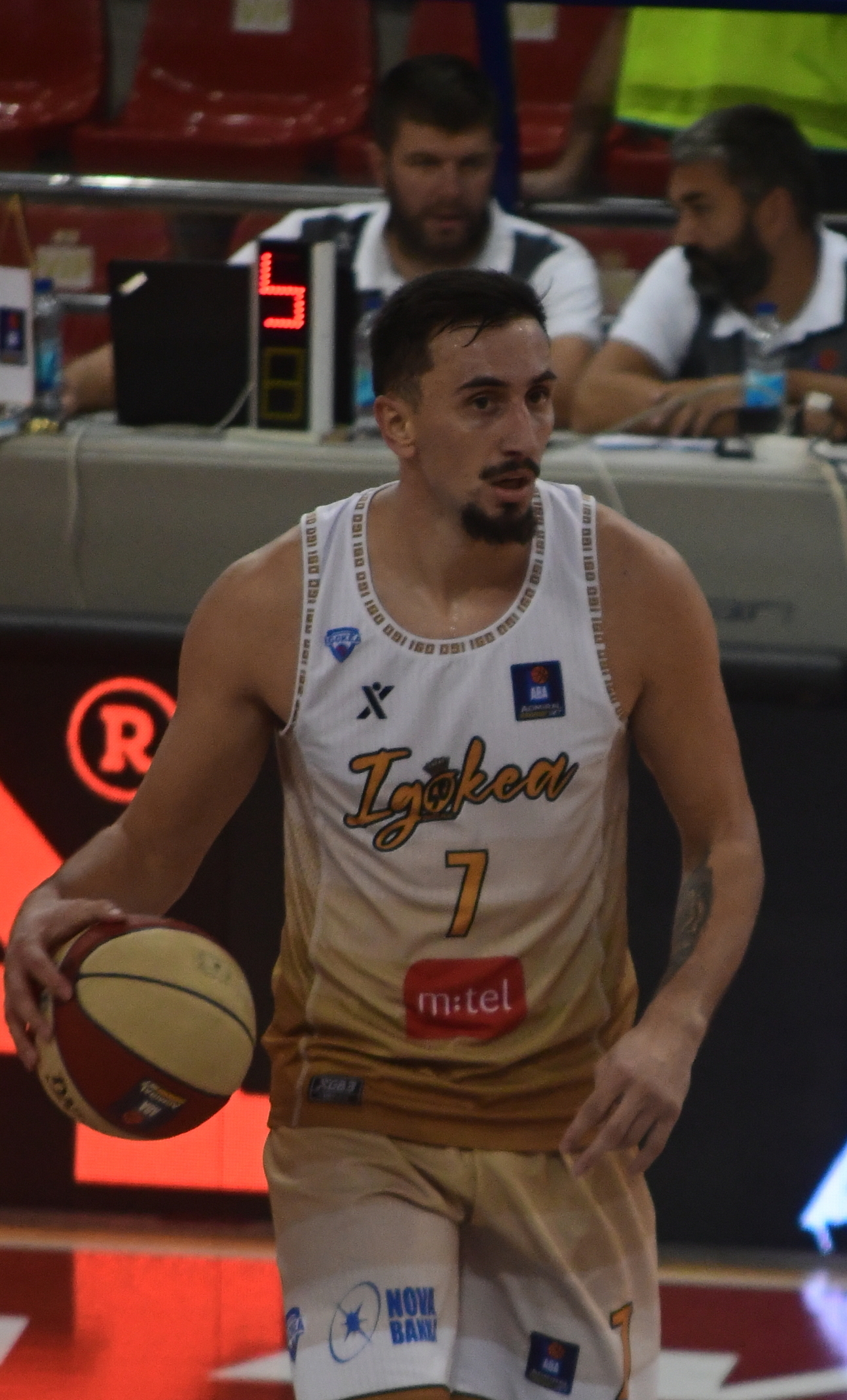
- Atić with Igokea in 2023

No. 5 – Bosna
- Position: Small forward / shooting guard
- League: Bosnian League; ABA League; EuroCup

Personal information
- Born: 19 January 1997 (age 29) Bugojno, Bosnia and Herzegovina
- Listed height: 2.01 m (6 ft 7 in)
- Listed weight: 88.5 kg (195 lb)

Career information
- NBA draft: 2019: undrafted
- Playing career: 2013–present

Career history
- 2013–2015: Spars
- 2015–2018: AEK Athens
- 2016: → Spars
- 2016–2017: → Trikala Aries
- 2018–2020: Mega Bemax
- 2020–2021: Igokea
- 2021–2023: Budućnost
- 2023–2024: Igokea
- 2024–2025: Breogán
- 2025–present: Bosna

Career highlights
- FIBA Champions League champion (2018); Greek Cup winner (2018); Bosnian League champion (2026); 2× Bosnian Cup winner (2021, 2026); 2× Montenegrin League champion (2022, 2023); 2× Montenegrin Cup winner (2022, 2023); Bosnian Sportsman of the Year (2025)

Edin Atić (born 19 January 1997) is a Bosnian professional basketball player for Bosna of the Bosnian League, the ABA League, and the EuroCup. Standing at 6 ft 7 in (2.01 m) and weighing 195 lbs (88 kg), Atić is mainly a shooting guard–small forward, but he can also play as a point forward. He also represents the senior Bosnia and Herzegovina national team.

== Early life ==
Atić was born in Bugojno, Bosnia and Herzegovina. Raised in Donji Vakuf, Atić started playing basketball with Spars.

== Professional career ==
=== Spars Sarajevo ===
In 2013, Atić signed a deal with Sarajevo-based club Spars, of the Bosnian Championship. He stayed a member of Spars from 2013 to September 2015, when the Greek club AEK bought his player rights with a transfer fee. In January 2016, he returned to Spars, after AEK loaned him back to the club, for the remainder of the 2015–16 season.

=== AEK Athens ===
On 1 September 2015, Greek club AEK Athens, of the Greek Basket League, confirmed that Atić would join the club from Spars, for a buyout transfer fee amount of €750,000. Atić signed a six-year contract with AEK, that was worth €1.5 million net income. In January 2016, AEK loaned him back to Spars for the rest of the season.

Before the start of the 2016–17 Greek Basket League season, Atić managed to have some very good friendly games, including a 12-point game against the defending EuroLeague champions, CSKA Moscow. Due to this, AEK initially decided to keep him on their roster for the 2016–17 season, rather than loan him to another club again.

However, due to FIBA's rules and regulations of the FIBA Champions League, he was ruled ineligible to play in the league, because he was not originally registered for the Greek League as a foreign player in the league's first roster designation period. Due to FIBA Champions League rules, such players cannot play in the league, unlike European-wide leagues like the EuroLeague and EuroCup, where no such limitations exist. As a result of this, AEK decided to loan him to another club for the 2016–17 season. With AEK, he won the Greek Cup's, 2018 edition, and also the FIBA Champions League title. On 14 July 2018, Atić was released by the Greek club.

=== Trikala Aries ===
On 2 November 2016, AEK loaned Atić to the Greek club Trikala Aries, for the remainder of the 2016–17 season. However, after playing with Trikala in 7 games during the 2016–17 Greek Basket League season, his player loan was cancelled, and he returned to AEK.

== National team career ==
=== Bosnian junior national team ===
Atić played at the 2014 FIBA Europe Under-18 Championship with the Bosnian Under-18 junior national team, averaging 16.0 points, 5.2 rebounds, and 2.4 assists per game. He also played at the 2015 FIBA Europe Under-18 Championship, where he led his team in scoring, at 16.0 points per game. He also averaged 7.6 rebounds and 3.8 assists per game during the tournament. His team finished the tournament in 4th place, and Atić was named to the All-Tournament Team.

He also played at the 2nd-tier level 2016 FIBA Europe Under-20 Championship Division B tournament, where he averaged 12.1 points, 7.1 rebounds, and 6.1 assists per game.

=== Bosnian senior national team ===
Atić is a member of the senior men's Bosnian national basketball team. With Bosnia, he played at the 2019 FIBA World Cup European qualification.

== Career statistics ==
=== Domestic Leagues ===
==== Regular season ====
Legend
GP	Games played	MPG	Minutes per game	FG%	Field goal percentage
3P%	3-point field goal percentage	FT%	Free throw percentage	RPG	Rebounds per game
APG	Assists per game	SPG	Steals per game	BPG	Blocks per game
PPG	Points per game	**Bold**	Career high		Led the league

Note: Only games in the primary domestic competitions are included. Therefore, games in cup or European competitions are left out.

Year	Team	League	GP	MPG	FG%	3P%	FT%	RPG	APG	SPG	BPG	PPG
2016–17	Trikala	GBL	7	6.4	.357	.167	1.000	1.4	0.4	0.3	0.0	1.9
2017–18	A.E.K.	GBL	13	9.5	.520	.300	.571	1.7	1.1	0.2	0.0	2.5
2018–19	Mega Basket	ABA	20	19.5	.397	.343	.553	4.9	2.2	1.4	0.3	8.3

=== FIBA Champions League ===
†	Denotes seasons in which Atić won the FIBA Champions League

Year	Team	GP	MPG	FG%	3P%	FT%	RPG	APG	SPG	BPG	PPG
2017–18†	A.E.K.	7	9.1	.588	.000	.500	1.9	.3	.3	.0	3.0

== Awards and accomplishments ==
=== Club career ===
- FIBA Champions League Champion: (2018)
- Greek Cup Winner: 2018
- Bosnian League Champion: (2026)
- Bosnian Cup Winner: (2021, 2026)
- Montenegrin League Champion: (2022, 2023)
- Montenegrin Cup Winner: (2022, 2023)

=== Bosnian junior national team ===
- 2015 FIBA Europe Under-18 Championship: All-Tournament Team

=== Individual ===
- Bosnian Sportsman of the Year: 2025
