= Andrei Sopin =

Russian basketball player

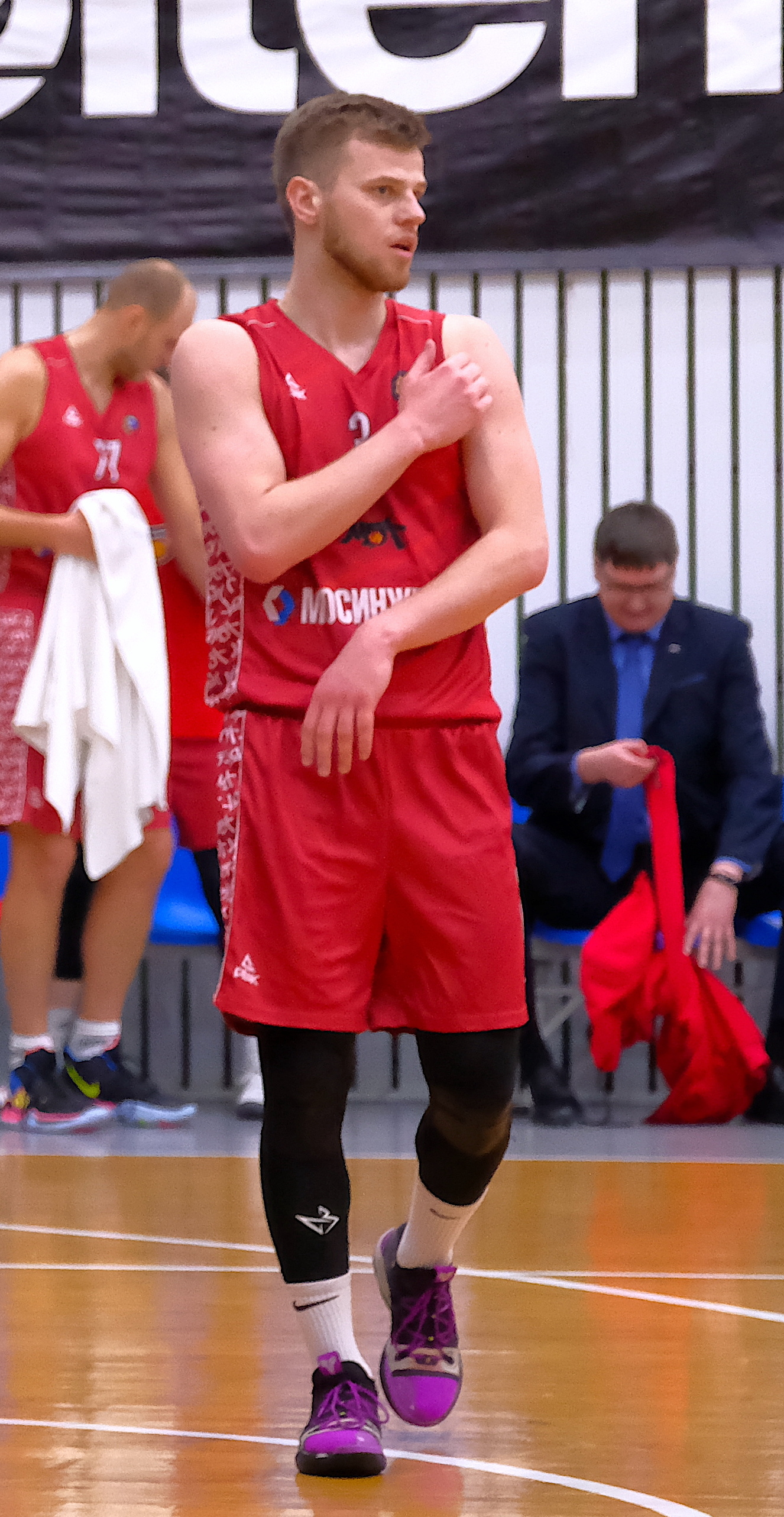

No. 3 – Runa Basket Moscow
- Position: Point guard
- League: VTB United League

Personal information
- Born: July 29, 1997 (age 29) Moscow, Russia
- Listed height: 1.86 m (6 ft 1 in)
- Listed weight: 172 lb (78 kg)

Career information
- Playing career: 2015–present

Career history
- 2015–2021: MBA Moscow
- 2021–present: Runa Basket Moscow

Andrei Sopin (born July 7, 1997) is a Russian professional basketball player, who plays in the senior Russia national basketball team.

== Russian national team ==
Sopin was a member of the Russian junior national teams. With Russia's junior national teams, he played at the 2013 FIBA Europe Under-16 Championship, the FIBA U18 European Championship, and the 2017 FIBA U20 European Championship.

Sopin is a member of the senior Russian national basketball team, with Russia's senior men team, he played at the 2019 FIBA Basketball World Cup where he averaged 2.3 points, 0.3 rebounds and 1 assists per game.
