= İrfan Şahin =

Irfan Sahin
- Born: 1963 (age 62–63); İzmit, TR
- Education: Ankara University Political Science Faculty
- Occupations: CEO, Dogan Tv Holding

İrfan Şahin (born 1963, in İzmit) is a Turkish TV executive.

== Early life and education ==
İrfan Şahin attended primary and secondary education in İzmit, after which he trained as a police officer. While attending the police academy, he also studied political science at Ankara University.

== Career ==
He worked as a deputy inspector at Ankara Police Headquarters for 2 years, followed by 3 years as an auditor at Yapı ve Kredi Bank and then at İktisat Bank.

In 1992, he switched careers and worked at Show TV until 1996, when he moved to Cine5, the first Turkish subscription TV channel. He was employed as a manager there until 2004, with a hiatus in 1998 when he made a brief return to the banking sector. He also held a position as general manager at the monthly magazine Marie Claire.

He started to work for Doğan Group as a general manager at ANS Production Company in 2004. He was the creator and producer of the TV series Gümüş.

In 2006, Şahin became head of the TV channel Kanal D, owned by the Doğan Group. In 2010, he was became CEO of Doğan TV Holding. He left Doğan Group in 2015.
