= Shaheen Sheik =

American singer-songwriter

Shaheen Sheik (born June 17, 1975) is an American, singer, song-writer, producer, dancer and an actor based in Los Angeles, California. Her musical work spans several genres, including rock/pop, electronic and chill-out music. She grew up in Cleveland and Los Angeles, but traces her roots to Tiruchirappalli, Tamil Nadu, India.

== Early years ==
Shaheen Sheik was born in Cleveland, Ohio to Iqbal Sheik, a psychiatrist, and Sharfudheen Sheik, a mechanical engineer. She also has an older brother, Zafar Sheik, a physician in Warren, Ohio. When she was a teenager, Sheik's family moved to Orange County, California.

As a child, Sheik was a studied classical dancer and later in life began studying vocal, guitar and sarod. She received her B.A. in Anthropology from the University of California, Berkeley and then studied law at the University of Virginia School of Law.

== Career ==
During a tour in Mumbai, Sheik was recognized as being "compared to Sheryl Crow and Shawn Colvin" by Express India. In 2008, Sheik released her second album Revolution, a world electronic album and departure from the guitar driven Rock Candy. When discussing Revolution, Sheik has stated that being a trained dancer taught her the connection between rhythm and emotion and that her second album focused on that connection.

After releasing Revolution, Sheik met Swedish producer, SoulAvenue, on MySpace. In 2008, SoulAvenue remixed Wildflower World (Wild Orchid Mix), which was included on Chillbar: Vol. 1. SoulAvenue then remixed Sheik's Revolution track, "Here We Go," which George V Records placed on Buddha Bar XII, mixed by DJ Ravin. On their third collaboration, Sheik and SoulAvenue's co-wrote "One By One", which was included on Buddha Bar XIII, again mixed by DJ Ravin. SoulAvenue and Sheik continue their collaborations to date, with tracks included on Buddha Bar XIV (2012), Buddha Bar XV (2013), Buddha Bar Greatest Hits (2019) and Buddha Bar Summer of Chill (2020).

== Dance ==
Sheik is a classically trained Bharatanatyam dancer and studied under Malathi Iyengar, artistic director of Rangoli Dance Company. In 2005, 2006, and 2008, Sheik received Lestor Horton Dance Award nominations for her performances in 'Ragamalika Varnam,' 'Kodhai's Dream', and Jatiswaram ('Kodhai's Dream'). The Los Angeles Times described Sheik's portrayal of Krishna in 'Kodhai's Dream' as "commanding" and her duet with fellow company dancer, Lakshmi Iyengar, as "a breathtaking finale."

== Personal life ==
In 2007, Sheik married real estate developer, Harpal Sadhal. She gave birth to their daughter in 2010 and their son in 2012.

== Discography ==
Albums

- Live From Santosha (2003)
- In Your Love (EP) (2003)
- Rock Candy (2005)
- Revolution (May 1, 2008)
