= Nedim Đedović =

Bosnian basketball player

Free Agent
- Position: Small forward

Personal information
- Born: February 16, 1997 (age 29) Munich, Germany
- Listed height: 2.05 m (6 ft 9 in)
- Listed weight: 86 kg (190 lb)

Career information
- Playing career: 2014–present

Career history
- 2014–2018: FC Barcelona
- 2014–2017: →FC Barcelona B
- 2017: →Araberri BC
- 2017–2018: →FC Barcelona B
- 2018–2019: Araberri BC
- 2019–2020: Peñas Huesca
- 2020–2022: Melilla
- 2022–2023: CB Morón
- 2023: CB Prat
- 2023–2024: Real Betis

Nedim Đedović (born February 16, 1997) is a Bosnian professional basketball player. He is a 205 cm tall small forward. He is the younger brother of basketball player Nihad Đedović.
