= Selçuk Şahin (footballer, born 1983) =

Turkish footballer

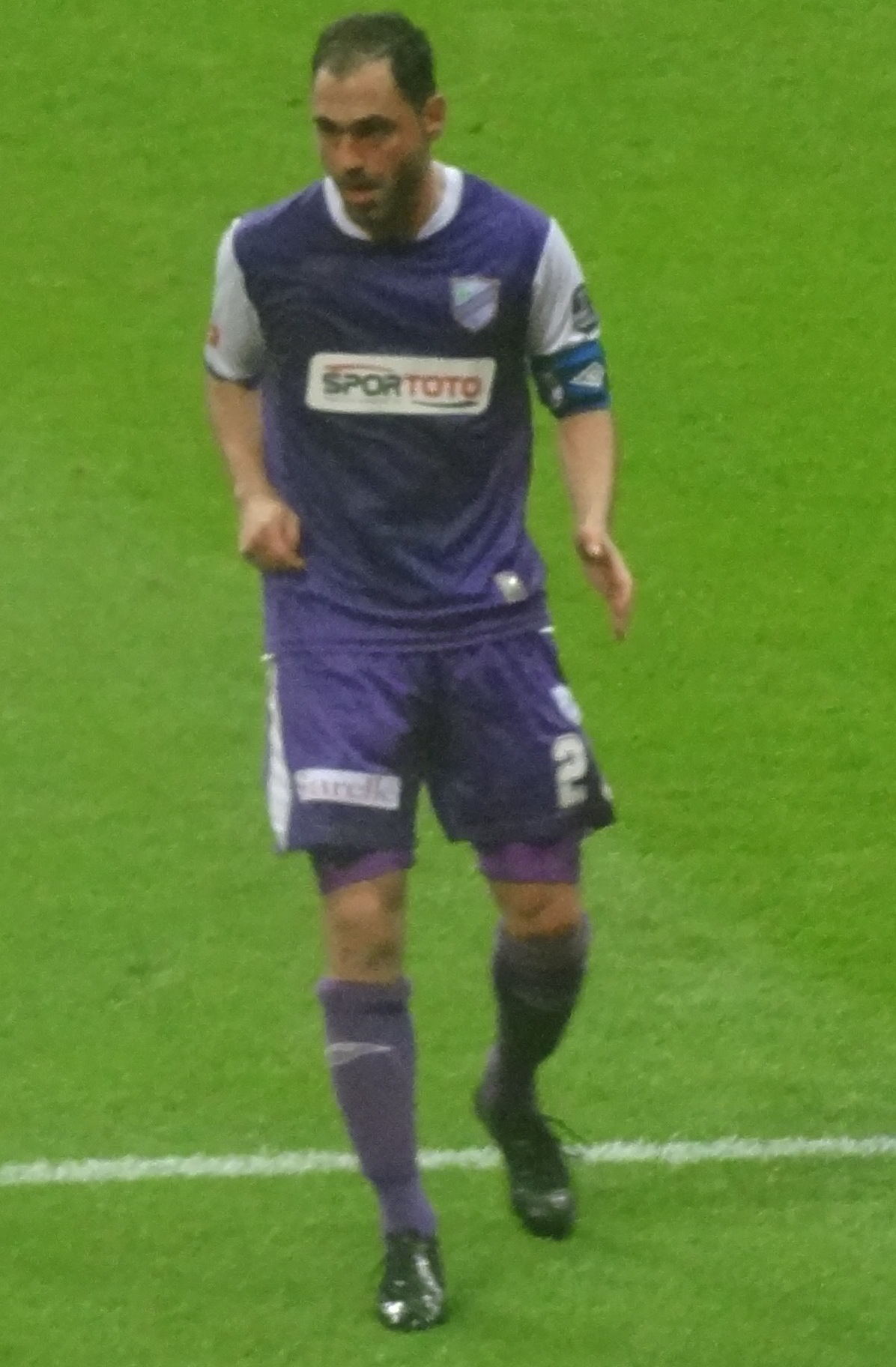

Personal information
- Full name: Selçuk Şahin
- Date of birth: 26 March 1983 (age 43)
- Place of birth: Munich, West Germany
- Height: 1.76 m (5 ft 9 1/2 in)
- Position: Left back

Youth career
- –1996: FC Bayern Munich
- 1996–2002: TSV 1860 München

Senior career*
Years	Team	Apps	(Gls)
2002–2004	TSV 1860 München II	26	(2)
2004–2005	FV Olympia Laupheim		
2005–2006	SSV Ulm 1846	30	(0)
2006–2008	Kartalspor	53	(1)
2008–2010	Hacettepe	44	(2)
2010–2013	Orduspor	47	(1)
2014–2015	Adanaspor	46	(0)
2015	Gümüşhanespor	1	(0)
2016–2019	Anadolu Bayern		
- * Club domestic league appearances and goals as of 14 September 2015

Selçuk Şahin (born 26 March 1983 in Munich, West Germany) is a Turkish retired footballer, who played as a left back.
