= Ercan Bayrak =

Turkish basketball player (born 1997)

No. 13 – Büyükçekmece
- Position: Power forward
- League: TBL

Personal information
- Born: July 9, 1997 (age 29) Istanbul, Turkey
- Listed height: 2.08 m (6 ft 10 in)
- Listed weight: 95 kg (209 lb)

Career information
- Playing career: 2015–present

Career history
- 2015–2016: Fenerbahçe
- 2016–2018: Samsunspor
- 2018–2021: Türk Telekom
- 2021–2022: Samsunspor
- 2022–2023: Yalovaspor
- 2023–2026: Çayırova Belediyesispor
- 2026–present: Büyükçekmece
Medals
Men's basketball
Representing Turkey
FIBA Europe Under-18 Championship
Silver medal – second place	2015 Greece	Team

Ercan Bayrak (born July 9, 1997) is a Turkish professional basketball player for Büyükçekmece of the TBL. Standing at 2.08 m (6 ft 10 in) he plays as a power forward.
