= Ercan Şahin =

Turkish musician (born 1971)

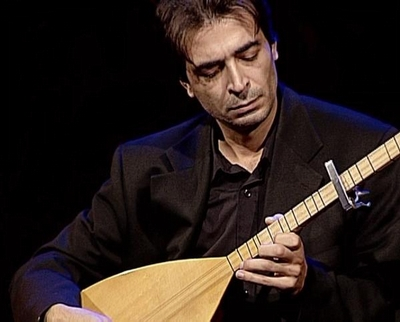
- Ercan Şahin

Background information
- Born: Ercan Şahin; 3 March 1971 (age 54)
- Origin: Sivas, Turkey
- Genres: Folk, jazz, world fusion, Turkish folk
- Occupations: Musician, songwriter, composer, bağlama player
- Instruments: Bağlama, vocals
- Years active: 1999–present
- Website: http://www.ercansahin.org

Ercan Şahin (born 1971 in Turkey) is a Turkish folk musician.

== Early life and education ==
Şahin's parents came from Sivas, a city in Anatolia which is known for its numerous poets and folk singers. At the age of 13, he found his first enquiries and collections of undiscovered Anatolian folk songs by travelling through different regions of Anatolia to get to know the local musical variety closer.

Şahin taught in different "national education centres", youth centres, foundations and private music schools "Bağlama", in Bursa, Turkey. In 1987, he founded his first music group and took part in different concerts in Germany and Turkey, accompanied by many singers and musicians with his "Bağlama".

== Career ==
At the end of 1994, Ercan Şahin moved to Cologne and continued his musical career there. He worked as musician in the Arkadas theatre. Since 1995, he taught the Anatolian stringed instrument "Bağlama" and music theory, particularly for people from Turkey, at the art house "Mosaik" and in different municipal music schools in Germany.

In 1999 Ercan Şahin published his first album Gam Elinden. In the same year, he prepared his pupils for a big musical event. A total of 174 of his Baglama pupils took part in the musical event "Saga of Millenium" in the event centre of Cologne, KölnArena. More than thousand Bağlama players divided the stage of the KölnArena in this arrangement and were accompanied in their repertoire by the Cologne symphony orchestra, an arrangement which earned an entry in the Guinness book of records. In 2002, the same event took place in Istanbul, Turkey.

In 2006, he met the group Ufermann, and published his second album Selam with it.

== Discography ==
- Gam Elinden (1999)
- Selam with the group ufermann(2006)
