= 1996 FIBA Europe Under-20 Championship qualification =

This page describes the qualification procedure for 1996 FIBA Europe Under-20 Championship.

== Qualified teams ==
Qualified as the host nation:

- Turkey

Qualified as the top teams in the previous tournament:

- Belarus
- Italy
- Spain

Qualified through the Qualifying Round

- Belgium
- France
- Greece
- Israel
- Lithuania
- Russia
- Slovenia
- Yugoslavia

== Qualification format ==
The Qualifying Round was held from 24 July to 30 July 1995. There were four groups, one group of six teams and three groups of seven teams. The first and second placed team from each group qualified for 1996 FIBA Europe Under-20 Championship. One team of each group hosted the mini-tournament.

== Qualifying round ==
=== Group A ===
All the games were played in Tallinn, Estonia.

Team	Pld	W	L	PF	PA	PD	Pts	Qualification
Israel	6	6	0	546	497	+49	12	Qualified for the Final Tournament
France	6	4	2	445	408	+37	10 (Note: CRO 70–71 FRA)	Qualified for the Final Tournament
Croatia	6	4	2	507	447	+60	10	
Estonia	6	3	3	486	449	+37	9	
Slovakia	6	2	4	458	512	−54	8 (Note: GEO 78–84 SVK)	
Georgia	6	2	4	465	498	−33	8	
Denmark	6	0	6	433	529	−96	6	

Notes:

24 July
France	66–73	Israel
Denmark	67–89	Estonia
Croatia	93–75	Georgia
25 July
Israel	95–83	Denmark
Estonia	60–68	Croatia
Slovakia	51–75	France
26 July
Croatia	87–99	Israel
Georgia	70–69	Estonia
Denmark	68–77	Slovakia
27 July
France	73–58	Denmark
Slovakia	67–90	Croatia
Israel	86–83	Georgia
28 July
Croatia	70–71	France
Estonia	81–86	Israel
Georgia	78–84	Slovakia
29 July
Denmark	75–99	Croatia
Slovakia	82–94	Estonia
France	84–63	Georgia
30 July
Israel	107–97	Slovakia
Georgia	96–82	Denmark
Estonia	93–76	France

=== Group B ===
All the games were played in Funchal, Portugal.

Team	Pld	W	L	PF	PA	PD	Pts	Qualification
Slovenia	6	6	0	543	403	+140	12	Qualified for the Final Tournament
Lithuania	6	5	1	541	422	+119	11	Qualified for the Final Tournament
Germany	6	4	2	519	423	+96	10	
Portugal	6	3	3	464	423	+41	9	
Macedonia	6	2	4	461	526	−65	8	
Sweden	6	1	5	447	465	−18	7	
Wales	6	0	6	348	661	−313	6	

24 July
Wales	55–120	Germany
Sweden	70–73	Slovenia
Lithuania	78–62	Portugal
25 July
Macedonia	73–99	Slovenia
Sweden	83–91	Lithuania
Wales	47–116	Portugal
26 July
Macedonia	58–86	Lithuania
Wales	58–85	Sweden
Portugal	67–80	Germany
27 July
Slovenia	77–68	Lithuania
Macedonia	92–73	Wales
Germany	72–52	Sweden
28 July
Slovenia	123–52	Wales
Germany	92–68	Macedonia
Portugal	70–66	Switzerland
29 July
Lithuania	125–63	Wales
Slovenia	88–76	Germany
Portugal	85–69	Macedonia
30 July
Lithuania	93–79	Germany
Sweden	91–101	Macedonia
Portugal	64–83	Slovenia

=== Group C ===
All the games were played in Constanța, Romania.

Team	Pld	W	L	PF	PA	PD	Pts	Qualification
Greece	5	5	0	491	397	+94	10	Qualified for the Final Tournament
Belgium	5	4	1	466	414	+52	9	Qualified for the Final Tournament
Romania	5	3	2	436	392	+44	8	
Latvia	5	2	3	404	451	−47	7	
Ukraine	5	1	4	371	410	−39	6	
Finland	5	0	5	394	498	−104	5	

24 July
Greece	82–69	Ukraine
Latvia	87–71	Finland
Romania	87–88	Belgium
25 July
Ukraine	84–88	Latvia
Belgium	71–105	Greece
Romania	84–67	Finland
26 July
Greece	85–72	Latvia
Finland	76–116	Belgium
Romania	68–64	Ukraine
27 July
Greece	128–102	Finland
Ukraine	71–94	Belgium
Romania	114–82	Latvia
28 July
Finland	78–83	Ukraine
Belgium	97–75	Latvia
Romania	83–91	Greece

=== Group D ===
All the games were played in Yambol, Bulgaria.

Team	Pld	W	L	PF	PA	PD	Pts	Qualification
Yugoslavia	6	6	0	639	428	+211	12	Qualified for the Final Tournament
Russia	6	5	1	584	408	+176	11	Qualified for the Final Tournament
Poland	6	3	3	549	528	+21	9 (Note: POL 1–1 (+10); CZE 1–1 (−4); BUL 1–1 (−6))	
Czech Republic	6	3	3	474	502	−28	9	
Bulgaria	6	3	3	514	506	+8	9	
Hungary	6	1	5	477	551	−74	7	
Albania	6	0	6	345	659	−314	6	

Notes:

24 July
Yugoslavia	135–52	Albania
Russia	123–67	Poland
Hungary	80–90	Bulgaria
25 July
Czech Republic	64–92	Yugoslavia
Albania	75–109	Hungary
Bulgaria	75–92	Russia
26 July
Hungary	64–69	Czech Republic
Russia	102–42	Albania
Poland	82–84	Bulgaria
27 July
Czech Republic	57–84	Russia
Albania	41–107	Poland
Yugoslavia	111–71	Hungary
28 July
Poland	102–90	Czech Republic
Russia	79–100	Yugoslavia
Bulgaria	106–61	Albania
29 July
Yugoslavia	104–89	Poland
Hungary	67–104	Russia
Czech Republic	94–86	Bulgaria
30 July
Poland	102–86	Hungary
Albania	74–100	Czech Republic
Bulgaria	73–97	Yugoslavia

== Bibliography ==
- FIBA Archive
- FIBA Europe Archive
