= 2026 FIBA U20 EuroBasket =

International basketball competition

Tournament details
- Host country: Slovenia
- City: Ljubljana
- Dates: 11–19 July 2026
- Teams: 16 (from 1 confederation)
- Venues: 2 (in 1 host city)

Final positions
- Champions: Slovenia (3rd title)
- Runners-up: Serbia
- Third place: Spain
- Fourth place: France

Tournament statistics
- Games played: 56
- Attendance: 24,250 (433 per game)
- MVP: (Slovenia) Mark Padjen
- Top scorer: (Czech Republic) Lukáš Smažák (17.1 ppg)
- Top rebounds: (Lithuania) Mantas Juzėnas (10.3 rpg)
- Top assists: (Spain) Raúl Villar (7.0 apg)
- PPG (Team): Lithuania (89.1 ppg)
- RPG (Team): Serbia (48.0 rpg)
- APG (Team): Slovenia (23.0 apg)

Official website
- www.fiba.basketball

The 2026 FIBA U20 EuroBasket was the 27th edition of the European basketball championship for men's under-20 national teams. The tournament was played in Ljubljana, Slovenia, from 11 to 19 July 2026.

The host team, Slovenia, secured their third overall title with a victory over Serbia in the final, 84–65.

== Participating teams ==
Team	App	Last	Streak	Best placement in the tournament	Prev
Teams maintained from the 2025 edition
Belgium	10th	2025	5	Fourth place (2023, 2024)	12th
Croatia	19th	2023	1	Runners-up (2018)	▲2nd, Div. B
Czech Republic	13th	2025	3	Sixth place (2015, 2024)	9th
France	26th	2025	20	Champions (2010, 2023, 2024)	3rd
Germany	21st	2025	16	Third place (2018, 2019)	13th
Greece	26th	2025	8	Champions (2002, 2009, 2017)	5th
Israel	24th	2025	12	Champions (2018, 2019)	6th
Italy	25th	2025	20	Champions (1992, 2013, 2025)	1st
Latvia	17th	2019	1	Runners-up (2013)	▲1st, Div. B
Lithuania	25th	2025	25	Champions (1996, 2012)	2nd
Poland	9th	2025	6	Eighth place (2024)	10th
Romania	4th	2025	2	Nineth place (1992)	11th
Serbia	17th	2025	4	Champions (2007, 2008, 2015)	4th
Slovenia	25th	2025	6	Champions (2000, 2004)	7th
Spain	27th	2025	27	Champions (2011, 2016, 2022)	8th
Turkey	25th	2024	1	Champions (2014)	▲3rd, Div. B

== First round ==
The draw of the first round was held on 5 February 2026 in Freising, Germany.

In the first round, the teams were drawn into four groups of four. All teams advanced to the playoffs.

All times are local (Central European Summer Time; UTC+2).

=== Group A ===
Pos	Team	Pld	W	L	PF	PA	PD	Pts
1	France	3	3	0	241	176	+65	6
2	Germany	3	1	2	227	245	−18	4
3	Turkey	3	1	2	207	226	−19	4
4	Italy	3	1	2	191	219	−28	4

Source: FIBA

11 July 2026
13:00

Boxscore

Italy	67–85	Germany
Scoring by quarter: 24–26, 9–23, 21–20, 13–16
Pts: Accorsi 15; Rebs: Nistrio, Airhienbuwa 6 Asts: Accorsi, Trucchetti 4		Pts: Biel 17; Rebs: Biel 10; Asts: Müller 6

Arena Stožice II, Ljubljana
Attendance: 80
Referees: Fernando Calatrava (ESP), Marius Ciulin (ROU), Romana Stojanović (CRO)

11 July 2026
15:30

Boxscore

Turkey	57–79	France
Scoring by quarter: 15–21, 12–14, 12–18, 18–26
Pts: Coşkun 15; Rebs: Kaba 5 Asts: Onat 5		Pts: three players 9 Rebs: Diakité 7 Asts: Soulhac 9

Arena Stožice II, Ljubljana
Attendance: 130
Referees: Paulo Marques (POR), Gintaras Maciulis (LTU), Blaž Zupančič (SLO)

12 July 2026
13:30

Boxscore

Germany	76–83	Turkey
Scoring by quarter: 17–22, 17–20, 16–21, 26–20
Pts: Remagen, Loll 24; Rebs: Loll 9 Asts: Kodjoe 5		Pts: Altuntas 19; Rebs: Altuntas 14; Asts: Kutluay, Onat 4

Arena Stožice, Ljubljana
Attendance: 180
Referees: Martin Horozov (BUL), Ivor Matejek (CZE), Chess Van Looy (BEL)

12 July 2026
21:00

Boxscore

France	67–53	Italy
Scoring by quarter: 11–14, 18–12, 24–6, 14–21
Pts: Pons 12; Rebs: Wembanyama 12; Asts: Soulhac 4		Pts: Lonati 15; Rebs: Atamah, Airhienbuwa 7 Asts: three players 2

Arena Stožice, Ljubljana
Attendance: 400
Referees: Georgios Poursanidis (GRE), Roko Hordov (CRO), Blaž Zupančič (SLO)

13 July 2026
20:30

Boxscore

France	95–66	Germany
Scoring by quarter: 16–18, 27–11, 22–20, 30–17
Pts: Pons 23; Rebs: Pons 10; Asts: Sissoko 9		Pts: Baumer 16; Rebs: Kosjoe 6 Asts: Remagen, Abra 4

Arena Stožice II, Ljubljana
Attendance: 250
Referees: Ademir Zurapović (BIH), Ivor Matejek (CZE), Siniša Prpa (SRB)

13 July 2026
21:00

Boxscore

Italy	71–67	Turkey
Scoring by quarter: 27–12, 14–17, 12–16, 18–22
Pts: Airhienbuwa, Lonati 20; Rebs: Airhienbuwa 9 Asts: Accorsi 4		Pts: Onat 17; Rebs: Altuntas 14; Asts: Onat 8

Arena Stožice, Ljubljana
Attendance: 300
Referees: Paulo Marques (POR), Marius Ciulin (ROU), Dimitar Georgiev (BUL)

=== Group B ===
Pos	Team	Pld	W	L	PF	PA	PD	Pts
1	Serbia	3	3	0	252	190	+62	6
2	Lithuania	3	2	1	273	224	+49	5
3	Latvia	3	1	2	221	261	−40	4
4	Poland	3	0	3	202	273	−71	3

Source: FIBA

11 July 2026
18:00

Boxscore

Serbia	84–67	Poland
Scoring by quarter: 23–20, 21–18, 19–16, 21–13
Pts: Džepina 21; Rebs: Džepina 13; Asts: three players 3		Pts: Czapla 16; Rebs: four players 4 Asts: Szelazek 6

Arena Stožice II, Ljubljana
Attendance: 250
Referees: Georgios Poursanidis (GRE), Ivor Matejek (CZE), Chess van Looy (BEL)

11 July 2026
20:30

Boxscore

Latvia	78–104	Lithuania
Scoring by quarter: 26–23, 21–32, 14–24, 17–25
Pts: Kilups 27; Rebs: Drava, Ozols 7 Asts: three players 3		Pts: Rudaitis 19; Rebs: Juzėnas 10; Asts: Laurenčikas 6

Arena Stožice II, Ljubljana
Attendance: 250
Referees: Ademir Zurapović (BIH), Roko Hordov (CRO), Ori Shalhavi (ISR)

12 July 2026
16:00

Boxscore

Lithuania	57–79	Serbia
Scoring by quarter: 12–18, 9–32, 22–13, 14–16
Pts: Juzėnas 13; Rebs: Juzėnas 6 Asts: Grunkis 3		Pts: Džepina, Lučić 12; Rebs: Bošnjaković 6 Asts: Bošnjaković 5

Arena Stožice, Ljubljana
Attendance: 400
Referees: Fernando Calatrava (ESP), Marius Ciulin (ROU), Ori Shalhavi (ISR)

12 July 2026
18:00

Boxscore

Poland	68–77	Latvia
Scoring by quarter: 13–24, 19–16, 15–23, 21–14
Pts: Baganc 13; Rebs: Baganc 9 Asts: three players 2		Pts: Šulcs 22; Rebs: Ozols 9 Asts: four players 3

Arena Stožice II, Ljubljana
Attendance: 150
Referees: Paulo Marques (POR), Gabrielius Simonavičius (LTU), Nataša Dragojević (MNE)

13 July 2026
13:30

Boxscore

Lithuania	112–67	Poland
Scoring by quarter: 30–18, 27–19, 27–16, 28–14
Pts: Juzėnas 46; Rebs: Juzėnas 12; Asts: Grunkis 7		Pts: Miličić 12; Rebs: Kiejzik 5 Asts: Miličić 5

Arena Stožice, Ljubljana
Attendance: 100
Referees: Fernando Calatrava (ESP), Nermin Hodzic (GER), Chess Van Looy (BEL)

13 July 2026
16:00

Boxscore

Serbia	89–66	Latvia
Scoring by quarter: 18–17, 22–20, 24–11, 25–18
Pts: Džepina 20; Rebs: Džepina 8 Asts: Suput 5		Pts: Talcis 13; Rebs: Vavers 6 Asts: Kilups, Vavers 4

Arena Stožice, Ljubljana
Attendance: 230
Referees: Yener Yılmaz (TUR), Valentin Oliot (FRA), Blaz Zupancic (SLO)

=== Group C ===
Pos	Team	Pld	W	L	PF	PA	PD	Pts
1	Spain	3	3	0	246	185	+61	6
2	Croatia	3	2	1	196	202	−6	5
3	Greece	3	1	2	215	219	−4	4
4	Belgium	3	0	3	181	232	−51	3

Source: FIBA

11 July 2026
13:30

Boxscore

Belgium	58–81	Spain
Scoring by quarter: 12–14, 13–22, 20–19, 13–26
Pts: Kekenbosch 21; Rebs: De Mol 7 Asts: Tallir, T'Joncke 3		Pts: Blanco 13; Rebs: Alocen 9 Asts: Villar, Cebolla 6

Arena Stožice, Ljubljana
Attendance: 150
Referees: Lorenzo Baldini (ITA), Gabrielius Simonavičius (LTU), Nataša Dragojević (MNE)

11 July 2026
16:00

Boxscore

Croatia	69–64	Greece
Scoring by quarter: 19–18, 15–17, 19–17, 16–12
Pts: Torbarina, Subašić 15; Rebs: three players 5 Asts: Mirceta, Torbarina 4		Pts: Pagonis 17; Rebs: Pagonis 11; Asts: Patrikis, Pagonis 3

Arena Stožice, Ljubljana
Attendance: 230
Referees: Martin Horozov (BUL), Janis Rozenbergs (LAT), Oleksandr Dotsenko (LUX)

12 July 2026
13:00

Boxscore

Greece	84–69	Belgium
Scoring by quarter: 25–13, 18–11, 18–22, 23–23
Pts: Pagonis 18; Rebs: Chantzis 10; Asts: Nikolaidis 5		Pts: De Mol 18; Rebs: Kekenbosch, Voet 9 Asts: Tallir 5

Arena Stožice II, Ljubljana
Attendance: 40
Referees: Yener Yılmaz (TUR), Nermin Hodzic (GER), Siniša Prpa (SRB)

12 July 2026
20:30

Boxscore

Spain	84–60	Croatia
Scoring by quarter: 19–11, 14–13, 30–22, 21–14
Pts: Arias, Villar 12; Rebs: Alocen 7 Asts: Villar 5		Pts: Skrobot 14; Rebs: three players 4 Asts: Torbarina 4

Arena Stožice II, Ljubljana
Attendance: 200
Referees: Valentin Oliot (FRA), Gintaras Mačiulis (LTU), Dimitar Georgiev (BUL)

13 July 2026
15:30

Boxscore

Belgium	54–67	Croatia
Scoring by quarter: 17–12, 8–18, 15–16, 14–21
Pts: Eruka 12; Rebs: De Mol 12; Asts: Tallir 8		Pts: Subašić 24; Rebs: Kos 9 Asts: Dolic, Bubalo 4

Arena Stožice II, Ljubljana
Attendance: 80
Referees: Lorenzo Baldini (ITA), Janis Rozenbergs (LAT), Ori Shalhavi (ISR)

13 July 2026
18:00

Boxscore

Greece	67–81	Spain
Scoring by quarter: 16–11, 21–26, 15–33, 15–11
Pts: Patrikis 11; Rebs: Patrikis 5 Asts: Chantzis 5		Pts: Torres 12; Rebs: Enabulele 7 Asts: Villar 9

Arena Stožice II, Ljubljana
Attendance: 250
Referees: Martin Horozov (BUL), Lukasz Jankowski (POL), Nataša Dragojević (MNE)

=== Group D ===
Pos	Team	Pld	W	L	PF	PA	PD	Pts
1	Slovenia (H)	3	3	0	262	182	+80	6
2	Israel	3	2	1	242	231	+11	5
3	Czech Republic	3	1	2	220	230	−10	4
4	Romania	3	0	3	185	266	−81	3

Source: FIBA
(H) Hosts

11 July 2026
18:30

Boxscore

Slovenia	77–54	Czech Republic
Scoring by quarter: 22–11, 19–14, 23–14, 13–15
Pts: Bolhar 18; Rebs: Hrabar, Menic 6 Asts: Padjen 8		Pts: Smazak 13; Rebs: Kristan, Soldan 7 Asts: three players 2

Arena Stožice, Ljubljana
Attendance: 1,000
Referees: Yener Yılmaz (TUR), Nermin Hodzic (GER), Siniša Prpa (SRB)

11 July 2026
21:00

Boxscore

Romania	68–78	Israel
Scoring by quarter: 21–24, 16–19, 16–16, 15–19
Pts: Angelian 16; Rebs: Angelian 7 Asts: Szentkuti, Dinu 4		Pts: Keller 21; Rebs: Belaga 10; Asts: Sahar 4

Arena Stožice, Ljubljana
Attendance: 200
Referees: Valentin Oliot (FRA), Łukasz Jankowski (POL), Dimitar Georgiev (BUL)

12 July 2026
15:30

Boxscore

Czech Republic	93–66	Romania
Scoring by quarter: 16–19, 34–21, 21–15, 22–11
Pts: Smazak 25; Rebs: three players 5 Asts: Synáček 5		Pts: Dinu 18; Rebs: Dinu 9 Asts: Dinu 6

Arena Stožice II, Ljubljana
Attendance: 80
Referees: Ademir Zurapović (BIH), Łukasz Jankowski (POL), Romana Stojanović (CRO)

12 July 2026
18:30

Boxscore

Israel	77–90	Slovenia
Scoring by quarter: 21–22, 15–23, 21–25, 20–20
Pts: Sahar 15; Rebs: Sela 7 Asts: three players 3		Pts: Kroflič 17; Rebs: Kroflič 10; Asts: Padjen 6

Arena Stožice, Ljubljana
Attendance: 1,025
Referees: Lorenzo Baldini (ITA), Jānis Rozenbergs (LAT), Oleksander Dotsenko (LUX)

13 July 2026
13:00

Boxscore

Israel	87–73	Czech Republic
Scoring by quarter: 26–16, 23–14, 21–16, 17–27
Pts: Sahar 16; Rebs: Danieli 7 Asts: Sahar, Belaga 7		Pts: Synáček 20; Rebs: Soldán 6 Asts: Smazak 9

Arena Stožice II, Ljubljana
Attendance: 80
Referees: Gintaras Mačiulis (LTU), Roko Hordov (CRO), Romana Stojanović (CRO)

13 July 2026
18:30

Boxscore

Slovenia	95–51	Romania
Scoring by quarter: 30–14, 26–12, 19–10, 20–15
Pts: Padjen 17; Rebs: Kroflič 6 Asts: Padjen 7		Pts: Dinu 18; Rebs: Dinu 6 Asts: Vlaicu 4

Arena Stožice, Ljubljana
Attendance: 850
Referees: Georgios Poursanidis (GRE), Gabrielius Simonavičius (LTU), Oleksander Dotsenko (LUX)

== Final round ==
=== Main bracket ===
Round of 16
A1 France	90
B4 Poland	79
C2 Croatia	93
D3 Czech Republic	69
B2 Lithuania	61
A3 Turkey	67
D1 Slovenia	88
C4 Belgium	61
A2 Germany	88
B3 Latvia	72
C1 Spain	77
D4 Romania	59
B1 Serbia	86
A4 Italy	63
D2 Israel	66
C3 Greece	79

Quarterfinals
A1 France	76
C2 Croatia	66
A3 Turkey	72
D1 Slovenia	90
A2 Germany	69
C1 Spain	88
B1 Serbia	92
C3 Greece	66

Semifinals
A1 France	89
D1 Slovenia	91
C1 Spain	65
B1 Serbia	72

Final
D1 Slovenia	84
B1 Serbia	65
Third place match
A1 France	54
C1 Spain	65

=== Round of 16 ===
15 July 2026
13:00

Boxscore

Spain	77–59	Romania
Scoring by quarter: 27–11, 26–21, 8–16, 16–11
Pts: Alocen 12; Rebs: Enabulele 10; Asts: Villar 9		Pts: Dubuc 11; Rebs: Illeș 8 Asts: four players 4

Arena Stožice II, Ljubljana
Attendance: 80
Referees: Yener Yılmaz (TUR), Gabrielius Simonavičius (LTU), Romana Stojanović (CRO)

15 July 2026
13:30

Boxscore

France	90–79	Poland
Scoring by quarter: 20–26, 26–13, 17–27, 27–13
Pts: Diakite 22; Rebs: Diakite 8 Asts: Sissoko 7		Pts: Kiejzik 22; Rebs: Baganc 7 Asts: Miličić, Prochorowicz 5

Arena Stožice, Ljubljana
Attendance: 150
Referees: Gintaras Maciulis (LTU), Nermin Hodzic (GER), Ori Shalhavi (ISR)

15 July 2026
15:30

Boxscore

Germany	88–72	Latvia
Scoring by quarter: 24–19, 27–30, 21–6, 16–17
Pts: Abra 16; Rebs: Lenke 9 Asts: Remagen, Müller 5		Pts: Niedra 24; Rebs: Ozols 13; Asts: Petrovics 4

Arena Stožice II, Ljubljana
Attendance: 150
Referees: Paulo Marques (POR), Valentin Oliot (FRA), Dimitar Georgiev (BUL)

15 July 2026
16:00

Boxscore

Croatia	93–69	Czech Republic
Scoring by quarter: 17–20, 22–21, 22–18, 32–10
Pts: Subašić 32; Rebs: Škrobot 6 Asts: Bubalo 5		Pts: Smazak 21; Rebs: Matusik, Ivanek 4 Asts: Smazak 5

Arena Stožice, Ljubljana
Attendance: 180
Referees: Georgios Poursanidis (GRE), Marius Ciulin (ROU), Chess Van Looy (BEL)

15 July 2026
18:00

Boxscore

Israel	66–79	Greece
Scoring by quarter: 12–18, 20–19, 16–18, 18–24
Pts: Sahar 20; Rebs: Sela 10; Asts: Belaga 5		Pts: Patrikis 22; Rebs: Chantzis 10; Asts: Chantzis 8

Arena Stožice II, Ljubljana
Attendance: 200
Referees: Ademir Zurapović (BIH), Jānis Rozenbergs (LAT), Blaz Zupancic (SLO)

15 July 2026
18:30

Boxscore

Slovenia	88–61	Belgium
Scoring by quarter: 28–19, 25–13, 21–10, 14–19
Pts: Padjen 20; Rebs: Menic 8 Asts: Kroflič 6		Pts: Tallir 15; Rebs: De Mol 7 Asts: T'Joncke 3

Arena Stožice, Ljubljana
Attendance: 1,125
Referees: Fernando Calatrava (ESP), Łukasz Jankowski (POL), Nataša Dragojević (MNE)

15 July 2026
20:30

Boxscore

Serbia	86–63	Italy
Scoring by quarter: 30–17, 20–15, 24–11, 12–20
Pts: Lučić 17; Rebs: Bundalo 7 Asts: Bošnjaković 5		Pts: Trucchetti 15; Rebs: Atamah, Baiocchi 4 Asts: Lonati 3

Arena Stožice II, Ljubljana
Attendance: 230
Referees: Martin Horozov (BUL), Ivor Matejek (CZE), Oleksandr Dotsenko (LUX)

15 July 2026
21:00

Boxscore

Lithuania	61–67	Turkey
Scoring by quarter: 16–25, 18–12, 6–18, 21–12
Pts: Grunkis 12; Rebs: Juzėnas 11; Asts: Juzėnas, Križanauskas 3		Pts: Onat 23; Rebs: Onat 12; Asts: Aksu 4

Arena Stožice, Ljubljana
Attendance: 250
Referees: Lorenzo Bandini (ITA), Roko Hordov (CRO), Siniša Prpa (SRB)

=== 9th–16th classification playoffs ===
9th–16th place quarterfinals
16 July
B4 Poland	90
D3 Czech Republic	83
16 July
B2 Lithuania	95
C4 Belgium	80
16 July
B3 Latvia	94
D4 Romania	60
16 July
A4 Italy	59
D2 Israel	84

9th–12th place semifinals
18 July
B4 Poland	84
B2 Lithuania	100
18 July
B3 Latvia	74
D2 Israel	96

Ninth place match
19 July
B2 Lithuania	95
D2 Israel	79
Eleventh place match
19 July
B4 Poland	100
B3 Latvia	83

13th–16th place semifinals
18 July
D3 Czech Republic	86
C4 Belgium	82
18 July
D4 Romania	69
A4 Italy	96

13th place match
19 July
D3 Czech Republic	80
A4 Italy	92
15th place match
19 July
C4 Belgium	86
D4 Romania	77

==== 9th–16th place quarterfinals ====
16 July 2026
13:00

Boxscore

Poland	90–83	Czech Republic
Scoring by quarter: 19–19, 29–23, 24–10, 18–31
Pts: Miličić 21; Rebs: Baganc, Luczak 10; Asts: Czapla 7		Pts: Smazak 24; Rebs: Kristan, Ivanek 6 Asts: Cank, Kremen 4

Arena Stožice II, Ljubljana
Attendance: 60
Referees: Fernando Calatrava (ESP), Nermin Hodzic (GER), Oleksandr Dotsenko (LUX)

16 July 2026
15:30

Boxscore

Latvia	94–60	Romania
Scoring by quarter: 20–11, 29–20, 18–15, 27–14
Pts: Šulcs 27; Rebs: Donis 8 Asts: Mucenieks 6		Pts: Illeș 14; Rebs: Illeș 7 Asts: Vlaicu 7

Arena Stožice II, Ljubljana
Attendance: 100
Referees: Gintaras Maciulis (LTU), Gabrielius Simonavičius (LTU), Nataša Dragojević (MNE)

16 July 2026
18:00

Boxscore

Lithuania	95–80	Belgium
Scoring by quarter: 21–19, 18–22, 34–16, 22–23
Pts: Rudaitis 17; Rebs: Juzėnas, Kancevičius 7 Asts: Grunkis, Jokubauskas 5		Pts: Voet 34; Rebs: Voet 9 Asts: Tallir 4

Arena Stožice II, Ljubljana
Attendance: 150
Referees: Georgios Poursanidis (GRE), Marius Ciulin (ROU), Romana Stojanović (CRO)

16 July 2026
20:30

Boxscore

Italy	59–84	Israel
Scoring by quarter: 16–21, 16–18, 11–20, 16–25
Pts: Airhienbuwa 18; Rebs: Atamah 9 Asts: Baiocchi, Trucchetti 3		Pts: Keller 19; Rebs: Sahar 9 Asts: Belaga 9

Arena Stožice II, Ljubljana
Attendance: 100
Referees: Yener Yılmaz (TUR), Łukasz Jankowski (POL), Sinisa Prpa (SRB)

==== 13th–16th place semifinals ====
18 July 2026
13:00

Boxscore

Czech Republic	86–82	Belgium
Scoring by quarter: 21−25, 28−20, 17−21, 20−16
Pts: Synáček 18; Rebs: Kristan, Ivanek 11; Asts: Kremen 4		Pts: De Mol 16; Rebs: Kekenbosch 16; Asts: Tallir 8

Arena Stožice II, Ljubljana
Attendance: 70
Referees: Ademir Zurapović (BIH), Janis Rozenbergs (LAT), Blaz Zupancic (SLO)

18 July 2026
15:30

Boxscore

Romania	69–96	Italy
Scoring by quarter: 19−31, 18−28, 18−26, 14−11
Pts: Dinu 20; Rebs: Illeș 8 Asts: Dinu 5		Pts: Trucchetti 22; Rebs: Baiocchi 7 Asts: Hassan 5

Arena Stožice II, Ljubljana
Attendance: 110
Referees: Martin Horozov (BUL), Nermin Hodzic (GER), Siniša Prpa (SRB)

==== 15th place match ====
19 July 2026
10:00

Boxscore

Belgium	86–77	Romania
Scoring by quarter: 27–19, 18–15, 19–24, 22–19
Pts: Voet 24; Rebs: three players 6 Asts: Tallir 7		Pts: Dinu 19; Rebs: Illeș 12; Asts: Horga, Dinu 6

Arena Stožice II, Ljubljana
Attendance: 30
Referees: Gintaras Mačiulis (LTU), Lukasz Jankowski (POL), Oleksandr Dotsenko (LUX)

==== 13th place match ====
19 July 2026
14:00

Boxscore

Czech Republic	80–92	Italy
Scoring by quarter: 23–18, 25–24, 19–27, 13–23
Pts: Smazak 22; Rebs: Kristan 6 Asts: Kremen 6		Pts: Trucchetti 25; Rebs: Atamah 7 Asts: Lonati 5

Arena Stožice, Ljubljana
Attendance: 100
Referees: Georgios Poursanidis (GRE), Gabrielius Simonavičius (LTU), Ori Shalhavi (ISR)

==== 9th–12th place semifinals ====
18 July 2026
18:00

Boxscore

Poland	84–100	Lithuania
Scoring by quarter: 20–21, 18–30, 24–21, 22–28
Pts: Miličić 21; Rebs: Niedzialkowski 6 Asts: three players 4		Pts: Jokubauskas 21; Rebs: Šacas 8 Asts: Grunkis 7

Arena Stožice II, Ljubljana
Attendance: 160
Referees: Yener Yılmaz (TUR), Roko Hordov (CRO), Nataša Dragojević (MNE)

18 July 2026
20:30

Boxscore

Latvia	74–96	Israel
Scoring by quarter: 20−27, 9−26, 26−22, 19−21
Pts: Kilups 19; Rebs: Ozols 16; Asts: Šulcs 4		Pts: Gold 25; Rebs: Belaga 10; Asts: Belaga 12

Arena Stožice II, Ljubljana
Attendance: 160
Referees: Fernando Calatrava (ESP), Marius Ciulin (ROU), Romana Stojanović (CRO)

==== Eleventh place match ====
19 July 2026
12:30

Boxscore

Poland	100–83	Latvia
Scoring by quarter: 27–12, 27–23, 24–29, 22–19
Pts: Baganc 15; Rebs: Miličić, Niedzialkowski 8 Asts: Galewski, Miličić 7		Pts: Talcis 16; Rebs: Talcis 9 Asts: Martinsons 5

Arena Stožice II, Ljubljana
Attendance: 50
Referees: Yener Yılmaz (TUR), Nermin Hodzic (GER), Romana Stojanović (CRO)

==== Ninth place match ====
19 July 2026
15:00

Boxscore

Lithuania	95–79	Israel
Scoring by quarter: 19–18, 20–23, 30–18, 26–20
Pts: Jokubauskas 31; Rebs: Juzėnas 20; Asts: Grunkis, Juzėnas 6		Pts: Keller 16; Rebs: Belaga 8 Asts: Sahar 8

Arena Stožice II, Ljubljana
Attendance: 80
Referees: Lorenzo Baldini (ITA), Valentin Oliot (FRA), Nataša Dragojević (MNE)

=== Quarterfinals ===
16 July 2026
13:30

Boxscore

France	76–66 (OT)	Croatia
Scoring by quarter: 14–15, 19–17, 11–13, 17–16, Overtime: 15–5
Pts: Diakité 20; Rebs: Diakité, Sankhé 11; Asts: Bracq 6		Pts: Subašić 16; Rebs: Skrobot 8 Asts: Bičić, Torbarina 4

Arena Stožice, Ljubljana
Attendance: 150
Referees: Lorenzo Baldini (ITA), Janis Rozenbergs (LAT), Ori Shalhavi (ISR)

16 July 2026
16:00

Boxscore

Germany	69–88	Spain
Scoring by quarter: 22–22, 15–21, 15–22, 17–23
Pts: Abra 11; Rebs: Lenke 7 Asts: Remagen 5		Pts: Carot 18; Rebs: Carot, Torres 9 Asts: Villar 12

Arena Stožice, Ljubljana
Attendance: 250
Referees: Ademir Zurapović (BIH), Roko Hordov (CRO), Blaz Zupancic (SLO)

16 July 2026
18:30

Boxscore

Turkey	72–90	Slovenia
Scoring by quarter: 22–31, 14–16, 19–25, 17–18
Pts: Coşkun 18; Rebs: Altuntas 6 Asts: three players 3		Pts: Kroflič 26; Rebs: Faganel 10; Asts: Kroflič, Petkovski 5

Arena Stožice, Ljubljana
Attendance: 1,350
Referees: Martin Horozov (BUL), Ivor Matejek (CZE), Dimitar Georgiev (BUL)

16 July 2026
21:00

Boxscore

Serbia	92–66	Greece
Scoring by quarter: 20–16, 30–19, 26–12, 16–19
Pts: Džepina 14; Rebs: Bundalo 7 Asts: Bošnjaković 6		Pts: Pagonis 17; Rebs: Pagonis 7 Asts: Komnianidis, Pagonis 5

Arena Stožice, Ljubljana
Attendance: 350
Referees: Paulo Marques (POR), Valentin Oliot (FRA), Chess Van Looy (BEL)

=== 5th–8th classification playoffs ===
5th–8th place semifinals
18 July
C2 Croatia	72
A3 Turkey	73
18 July
A2 Germany	58
C3 Greece	73

Fifth place match
19 July
A3 Turkey	56
C3 Greece	73
Seventh place match
19 July
C2 Croatia	91
A2 Germany	87

==== 5th–8th place semifinals ====
18 July 2026
13:30

Boxscore

Croatia	72–73	Turkey
Scoring by quarter: 18−19, 13−17, 19−16, 22−21
Pts: Torbarina 16; Rebs: Torbarina 6 Asts: Torbarina 7		Pts: Altuntas 24; Rebs: Onat 10; Asts: Onat 6

Arena Stožice, Ljubljana
Attendance: 130
Referees: Paulo Marques (POR), Valentin Oliot (FRA), Oleksandr Dotsenko (LUX)

18 July 2026
16:00

Boxscore

Germany	58–73	Greece
Scoring by quarter: 11−16, 12−12, 21−18, 14−27
Pts: Müller 15; Rebs: Isichei 9 Asts: Müller 3		Pts: Pagonis 24; Rebs: Chantzis 9 Asts: Nikolaidis 6

Arena Stožice, Ljubljana
Attendance: 180
Referees: Gintaras Maciulis (LTU), Gabrielius Simonavičius (LTU), Chess Van Looy (BEL)

==== Seventh place match ====
19 July 2026

Boxscore

Croatia	91–87	Germany
Scoring by quarter: 23−28, 25−24, 27−16, 16−19
Pts: Dolic 23; Rebs: Majdak 7 Asts: Bubalo, Dolic 5		Pts: Kodjoe 22; Rebs: Jung, Kodjoe 5 Asts: Müller 9

Arena Stožice II, Ljubljana
Attendance: 120
Referees: Fernando Calatrava (ESP), Janis Rozenbergs (LAT), Dimitar Georgiev (BUL)

==== Fifth place match ====
19 July 2026
11:30

Boxscore

Turkey	56–73	Greece
Scoring by quarter: 15–15, 10–25, 14–14, 17–19
Pts: Kutluay 14; Rebs: Onat 5 Asts: Kutluay 3		Pts: Xanthopoulos 23; Rebs: Chantzis 6 Asts: Nikolaidis 6

Arena Stožice, Ljubljana
Attendance: 50
Referees: Martin Horozov (BUL), Ivor Matejek (CZE), Blaž Zupančič (SLO)

=== Semifinals ===
18 July 2026
18:30

Boxscore

France	89–91	Slovenia
Scoring by quarter: 25–27, 22–25, 23–18, 19–21
Pts: Douglas 32; Rebs: Diakité 10; Asts: Ekanga-Ehawa 4		Pts: Padjen 25; Rebs: Faganel, Menic 6 Asts: Padjen 6

Arena Stožice, Ljubljana
Attendance: 2,800
Referees: Georgios Poursanidis (GRE), Lukasz Jankowski (POL), Ori Shalhavi (ISR)

18 July 2026
21:00

Boxscore

Spain	65–72	Serbia
Scoring by quarter: 11−25, 17−17, 21−17, 16−13
Pts: Garmendia 16; Rebs: Carot, Gaspa 5 Asts: Cebolla 4		Pts: Lučić 20; Rebs: Stanojević 11; Asts: Džepina 4

Arena Stožice, Ljubljana
Attendance: 900
Referees: Lorenzo Baldini (ITA), Ivor Matejek (CZE), Dimitar Georgiev (BUL)

=== Third place match ===
19 July 2026
16:30

Boxscore

France	54–65	Spain
Scoring by quarter: 12−11, 15−20, 14−12, 13−22
Pts: Audry 10; Rebs: Wembanyama 6 Asts: Soulhac 3		Pts: Amón, Gaspa 11; Rebs: Villar 9 Asts: Villar 5

Arena Stožice, Ljubljana
Attendance: 720
Referees: Ademir Zurapović (BIH), Roko Hordov (CRO), Siniša Prpa (SRB)

=== Final ===
19 July 2026
19:00

Boxscore

Slovenia	84–65	Serbia
Scoring by quarter: 15−13, 25−19, 23−14, 21−19
Pts: Hrabar 18; Rebs: Menic 7 Asts: Petkovski 7		Pts: Šojić 13; Rebs: Šojić 8 Asts: Šuput 4

Arena Stožice, Ljubljana
Attendance: 6,200
Referees: Paulo Marques (POR), Marius Ciulin (ROU), Chessa Van Looy (BEL)

== Final standings ==
Rank	Team	Record
1st place, gold medalist(s)	Slovenia	7–0
2nd place, silver medalist(s)	Serbia	6–1
3rd place, bronze medalist(s)	Spain	6–1
4th	France	5–2
5th	Greece	4–3
6th	Turkey	3–4
7th	Croatia	4–3
8th	Germany	2–5
9th	Lithuania	5–2
10th	Israel	4–3
11th	Poland	2–5
12th	Latvia	2–5
13th	Italy	3–4
14th	Czech Republic	2–5
15th	Belgium	1–6
16th	Romania	0–7

Relegated to the 2027 FIBA U20 EuroBasket Division B

== Awards ==
The awards were announced on 19 July 2026.

Award	Player
All-Tournament Team	(Slovenia) Mark Padjen
All-Tournament Team	(Slovenia) Urban Kroflič
All-Tournament Team	(Serbia) Nikola Džepina
All-Tournament Team	(Spain) Raúl Villar
All-Tournament Team	(France) Mohamed Diakité
Most Valuable Player	(Slovenia) Mark Padjen
