= 2007 FIBA Europe Under-20 Championship =

International basketball competition

2007 FIBA U20 European Championship
10th FIBA Under-20 European Basketball Championship

Tournament details
- Host country: Slovenia, Italy
- Dates: July 6–15
- Teams: 16 (from 48 federations)
- Venues: 2 (in 2 host cities)

Final positions
- Champions: Serbia (1st title)

Tournament statistics
- MVP: (Serbia) Miloš Teodosić
- Top scorer: (Latvia) Zaķis (24.7)
- Top rebounds: (Lithuania) Butkevicius (11.7)
- Top assists: (Serbia) Teodosić (5.4)
- PPG (Team): Spain (86.0)
- RPG (Team): Latvia (37.2)
- APG (Team): Serbia (13.8)

Official website
- www.fibaeurope.com

The 2007 FIBA Europe Under-20 Championship was the tenth edition of the FIBA Europe Under-20 Championship. The cities of Nova Gorica, in Slovenia, and Gorizia, in Italy, hosted the tournament. Serbia won their first title with that name (they won the 1998 Championship as Yugoslavia and the 2006 Championship as Serbia and Montenegro).

Macedonia and Hungary were relegated to Division B.

== Teams ==
- Bulgaria
- Croatia
- France
- Georgia
- Greece
- Hungary
- Israel
- Italy
- Latvia
- Lithuania
- Macedonia
- Russia
- Serbia
- Slovenia
- Spain
- Turkey

== Preliminary round ==
The sixteen teams were allocated in four groups of four teams each.

Team advanced to Qualifying round
Team competed in Classification round

=== Group A ===
Team	Pld	W	L	PF	PA	Pts
Slovenia	3	3	0	233	212	6
Serbia	3	2	1	258	201	5
France	3	1	2	251	246	4
Hungary	3	0	3	162	245	3

6 July 2007
Serbia	78–80	Slovenia	Nova Gorica
France	92–66	Hungary	Nova Gorica
7 July 2007
Slovenia	84–78	France	Nova Gorica
Hungary	40–84	Serbia	Nova Gorica
8 July 2007
Serbia	96–81	France	Gorizia
Hungary	56–69	Slovenia	Gorizia

=== Group B ===
Team	Pld	W	L	PF	PA	Pts
Russia	3	3	0	235	205	6
Turkey	3	1	2	226	236	4 (1–1 +4)
Lithuania	3	1	2	230	234	4 (1–1 +4)
Greece	3	1	2	208	224	4 (1–1 –8)

6 July 2007
Russia	78–70	Greece	Gorizia
Turkey	90–85	Lithuania	Gorizia
7 July 2007
Lithuania	61–69	Russia	Nova Gorica
Greece	63–62	Turkey	Nova Gorica
8 July 2007
Turkey	74–88	Russia	Nova Gorica
Greece	75–84	Lithuania	Nova Gorica

=== Group C ===
Team	Pld	W	L	PF	PA	Pts
Spain	3	3	0	251	195	6
Israel	3	2	1	209	168	5
Croatia	3	1	2	207	203	4
Macedonia	3	0	3	162	263	3

6 July 2007
Spain	88–69	Croatia	Nova Gorica
Israel	95–65	Macedonia	Nova Gorica
7 July 2007
Macedonia	60–93	Spain	Gorizia
Croatia	64–77	Israel	Gorizia
8 July 2007
Macedonia	70–88	Croatia	Gorizia
Spain	77–73	Israel	Gorizia

=== Group D ===
Team	Pld	W	L	PF	PA	Pts
Italy	3	3	0	252	172	6
Georgia	3	2	1	233	240	5
Bulgaria	3	1	2	221	250	4
Latvia	3	0	3	226	270	3

6 July 2007
Latvia	72–102	Georgia	Gorizia
Italy	86–51	Bulgaria	Gorizia
7 July 2007
Bulgaria	96–89	Latvia	Gorizia
Georgia	56–94	Italy	Gorizia
8 July 2007
Georgia	75–74	Bulgaria	Nova Gorica
Italy	72–65	Latvia	Nova Gorica

== Qualifying round ==
The twelve teams were allocated in two groups of six teams each. The results of the games between the teams from the same group in the preliminary round were taken into account for the ranking in this round.

Team advanced to Semifinals
Team competed in the 5th–8th playoffs
Team competed in the 9th–12th playoffs

=== Group E ===
Team	Pld	W	L	PF	PA	Pts
Serbia	5	4	1	427	385	9 (1–1 +4)
Russia	5	4	1	369	340	9 (1–1 +2)
Slovenia	5	4	1	397	377	9 (1–1 –6)
Turkey	5	2	3	401	422	7
France	5	1	4	393	415	6
Lithuania	5	0	5	377	425	5

10 July 2007
Turkey	83–88	Serbia	Gorizia
Lithuania	84–96	Slovenia	Nova Gorica
Russia	84–79	France	Gorizia
11 July 2007
Serbia	71–65	Russia	Nova Gorica
France	76–71	Lithuania	Gorizia
Slovenia	82–74	Turkey	Nova Gorica
12 July 2007
Turkey	80–79	France	Nova Gorica
Lithuania	76–94	Serbia	Nova Gorica
Russia	63–55	Slovenia	Nova Gorica

=== Group F ===
Team	Pld	W	L	PF	PA	Pts
Spain	5	5	0	441	355	10
Italy	5	4	1	403	327	9
Israel	5	3	2	378	350	8
Bulgaria	5	1	4	352	407	6 (1–1 +17)
Croatia	5	1	4	371	413	6 (1–1 +3)
Georgia	5	1	4	351	444	6 (1–1 –20)

10 July 2007
Georgia	74–81	Israel	Nova Gorica
Bulgaria	70–91	Spain	Nova Gorica
Italy	82–69	Croatia	Gorizia
11 July 2007
Spain	96–68	Georgia	Gorizia
Croatia	70–88	Bulgaria	Nova Gorica
Israel	62–66	Italy	Gorizia
12 July 2007
Georgia	78–99	Croatia	Nova Gorica
Bulgaria	69–85	Israel	Gorizia
Italy	75–89	Spain	Gorizia

== Classification round ==
Team relegated to Division B

=== Group G ===
Team	Pld	W	L	PF	PA	Pts
Greece	3	3	0	224	179	6
Latvia	3	2	1	247	225	5
Macedonia	3	1	2	226	230	4
Hungary	3	0	3	166	229	3

10 July 2007
Greece	84–58	Macedonia	Nova Gorica
Hungary	65–81	Latvia	Gorizia
12 July 2007
Macedonia	86–56	Hungary	Gorizia
Latvia	76–78	Greece	Gorizia
14 July 2007
Hungary	45–62	Greece	Nova Gorica
Macedonia	82–90	Latvia	Nova Gorica

== Knockout stage ==
=== 9th–12th playoffs ===
Playoffs
July 14, Nova Gorica
Croatia	96
Lithuania	82
July 14, Nova Gorica
France	96
Georgia	69

Ninth place
July 15, Nova Gorica
Croatia	82
France	91
Eleventh place
July 15, Nova Gorica
Lithuania	81
Georgia	70

=== 5th–8th playoffs ===
Playoffs
July 14, Gorizia
Israel	74
Turkey	64
July 14, Gorizia
Slovenia	79
Bulgaria	59

Fifth place
July 15, Gorizia
Israel	81
Slovenia	90
Seventh place
July 15, Nova Gorica
Turkey	97
Bulgaria	88

=== Championship ===
Semifinals
July 14, Gorizia
Spain	76
Russia	69
July 14, Gorizia
Serbia	77
Italy	62

Final
July 15, Gorizia
Spain	78
Serbia	87
Third place
July 15, Gorizia
Russia	63
Italy	74

== Final standings ==
Rank	Team
Gold medal	Serbia
Silver medal	Spain
Bronze medal	Italy
4th	Russia
5th	Slovenia
6th	Israel
7th	Turkey
8th	Bulgaria
9th	France
10th	Croatia
11th	Lithuania
12th	Georgia
13th	Greece
14th	Latvia
15th	Macedonia
16th	Hungary

2007 FIBA Europe U-20 Championship

Serbia
First title

Team roster

Miloš Teodosić, Milenko Tepić, Stefan Nikolić, Marko Đurković, Dragan Labović, Maksim Kovačević, Branko Jereminov, Nenad Zivčević, Vladimir Štimac, Ivan Paunić, Nikola Dragović, and Uroš Nikolić. Head coach: Vlada Vukoičić.

== Stats leaders ==
=== Points ===
Rank	Name	Points	Games	PPG
1.	(Latvia) Ronalds Zaķis	148	6	24.7
2.	(Bulgaria) Chavdar Kostov	146	8	18.3
3.	(Israel) Omri Casspi	143	8	17.9
3.	(France) Nando de Colo	143	8	17.9
5.	(Serbia) Dragan Labović	135	8	16.9

=== Rebounds ===
Rank	Name	Points	Games	RPG
1.	(Lithuania) Povilas Butkevicius	82	7	11.7
2.	(Slovenia) Gašper Vidmar	78	8	9.8
3.	(Spain) Xavi Rey	76	8	9.5
4.	(Latvia) Ronalds Zaķis	54	6	9.0
5.	(Croatia) Ante Tomić	65	8	8.1

=== Assists ===
Rank	Name	Points	Games	APG
1.	(Serbia) Miloš Teodosić	43	8	5.4
2.	(Slovenia) Jan Močnik	40	8	5.0
3.	(Turkey) Mehmet Yağmur	32	8	4.0
4.	(North Macedonia) Aleksandar Kostoski	23	6	3.8
5.	(France) Aldo Curti	30	8	3.8

== All-Tournament Team ==
- (Serbia) Miloš Teodosić
- (Russia) Alexey Shved
- (Italy) Luigi Datome
- (Serbia) Dragan Labović
- (Spain) Xavi Rey
