= 2006 FIBA Europe Under-20 Championship =

International basketball competition

2006 FIBA U20 European Championship
9th FIBA Under-20 European Basketball Championship

Tournament details
- Host country: Turkey
- Dates: July 14–23
- Teams: 16 (from 48 federations)
- Venue: 1 (in 1 host city)

Final positions
- Champions: Serbia and Montenegro (2nd title)

Tournament statistics
- MVP: (Turkey) Ersan İlyasova
- Top scorer: (Latvia) Kalve (20.5)
- Top rebounds: (Spain) Suárez (10.4)
- Top assists: (Latvia) Jeromanovs (6.3)
- PPG (Team): Bulgaria (81.4)
- RPG (Team): Spain (41.6)
- APG (Team): Russia (15.8)

Official website
- Official website (archive)

The 2006 FIBA Europe Under-20 Championship was the ninth edition of the FIBA Europe Under-20 Championship. The city of İzmir, in Turkey, hosted the tournament. Serbia and Montenegro won their second title, the first one with that name (they won the 1998 Championship) as Yugoslavia.

Germany and Belarus were relegated to Division B.

== Teams ==
- Belarus
- Bulgaria
- Croatia
- France
- Germany
- Greece
- Hungary
- Israel
- Italy
- Latvia
- Lithuania
- Russia
- Serbia and Montenegro
- Slovenia
- Spain
- Turkey

== Preliminary round ==
The sixteen teams were allocated in four groups of four teams each. Note that while Serbia and Montenegro dissolved into Serbia and Montenegro in June 2006, they still competed as one team.

Team advanced to Quarter-Final round
Team competed in Classification round

=== Group A ===
Team	Pld	W	L	PF	PA	Pts
Serbia and Montenegro	3	3	0	231	176	6
Croatia	3	2	1	231	215	5
Belarus	3	1	2	199	222	4
Latvia	3	0	3	217	251	3

14 July 2006
Serbia and Montenegro	72–61	Latvia	İzmir
Croatia	64–58	Belarus	İzmir
15 July 2006
Belarus	57–81	Serbia and Montenegro	İzmir
Latvia	79–95	Croatia	İzmir
16 July 2006
Latvia	77–84	Belarus	İzmir
Croatia	72–78	Serbia and Montenegro	İzmir

=== Group B ===
Team	Pld	W	L	PF	PA	Pts
Italy	3	2	1	212	177	5 (1–1 +2)
Slovenia	3	2	1	235	202	5 (1–1 +1)
Israel	3	2	1	206	205	5 (1–1 –3)
Hungary	3	0	3	169	238	3

14 July 2006
Israel	66–64	Italy	İzmir
Slovenia	92–60	Hungary	İzmir
15 July 2006
Hungary	68–72	Israel	İzmir
Italy	74–70	Slovenia	İzmir
16 July 2006
Slovenia	73–68	Israel	İzmir
Italy	74–41	Hungary	İzmir

=== Group C ===
Team	Pld	W	L	PF	PA	Pts
France	3	2	1	251	195	5 (1–1 +23)
Turkey	3	2	1	209	168	5 (1–1 +3)
Russia	3	2	1	207	203	5 (1–1 –26)
Germany	3	0	3	162	263	3

14 July 2006
Russia	63–92	France	İzmir
Turkey	83–45	Germany	İzmir
15 July 2006
Germany	51–81	Russia	İzmir
France	60–66	Turkey	İzmir
16 July 2006
France	99–66	Germany	İzmir
Turkey	60–63	Russia	İzmir

=== Group D ===
Team	Pld	W	L	PF	PA	Pts
Greece	3	2	1	228	222	5
Lithuania	3	2	1	261	255	5
Bulgaria	3	1	2	238	249	4
Spain	3	1	2	235	236	4

14 July 2006
Spain	73–75	Bulgaria	İzmir
Lithuania	71–81	Greece	İzmir
15 July 2006
Bulgaria	86–98	Lithuania	İzmir
Greece	69–74	Spain	İzmir
16 July 2006
Greece	78–77	Bulgaria	İzmir
Spain	88–92	Lithuania	İzmir

== Quarter-Final round ==
The eight teams were allocated in two groups of four teams each.

Team advanced to Semifinals
Team competed in 5th–8th playoffs

=== Group E ===
Team	Pld	W	L	PF	PA	Pts
Serbia and Montenegro	3	3	0	246	204	6
Slovenia	3	2	1	245	244	5
France	3	1	2	202	204	4
Lithuania	3	0	3	239	280	3

18 July 2006
Serbia and Montenegro	101–68	Lithuania	İzmir
Slovenia	67–65	France	İzmir
19 July 2006
Lithuania	94–100	Slovenia	İzmir
France	58–60	Serbia and Montenegro	İzmir
20 July 2006
France	79–77	Lithuania	İzmir
Serbia and Montenegro	85–78	Slovenia	İzmir

=== Group F ===
Team	Pld	W	L	PF	PA	Pts
Turkey	3	2	1	244	205	5
Italy	3	2	1	215	219	5
Croatia	3	1	2	233	249	4
Greece	3	1	2	222	241	4

18 July 2006
Croatia	87–72	Greece	İzmir
Italy	53–75	Turkey	İzmir
19 July 2006
Greece	70–76	Italy	İzmir
Turkey	91–72	Croatia	İzmir
20 July 2006
Croatia	74–86	Italy	İzmir
Turkey	78–80	Greece	İzmir

== Classification round ==
The eight teams were allocated in two groups of four teams each.

Team competed to 9th–12th playoffs
Team competed in 13th–16th playoffs

=== Group G ===
Team	Pld	W	L	PF	PA	Pts
Russia	3	3	0	245	149	6
Spain	3	2	1	228	183	5
Belarus	3	1	2	173	219	4
Hungary	3	0	3	147	242	3

18 July 2006
Belarus	50–78	Spain	İzmir
Hungary	36–82	Russia	İzmir
19 July 2006
Russia	86–52	Belarus	İzmir
Spain	89–56	Hungary	İzmir
20 July 2006
Belarus	71–55	Hungary	İzmir
Russia	77–61	Spain	İzmir

=== Group H ===
Team	Pld	W	L	PF	PA	Pts
Bulgaria	3	2	1	245	220	5
Israel	3	2	1	226	214	5
Germany	3	1	2	216	222	4
Latvia	3	1	2	239	270	4

18 July 2006
Israel	67–64	Germany	İzmir
Latvia	90–89	Bulgaria	İzmir
19 July 2006
Germany	86–76	Latvia	İzmir
Bulgaria	77–64	Israel	İzmir
20 July 2006
Germany	66–79	Bulgaria	İzmir
Latvia	73–95	Israel	İzmir

== Knockout stage ==
=== 13th–16th playoffs ===
Playoffs
July 22, İzmir
Belarus	59
Latvia	63
July 22, İzmir
Hungary	70
Germany	63

Thirteenth place
July 23, İzmir
Latvia	101
Hungary	69
Fifteenth place
July 23, İzmir
Belarus	59
Germany	81

Belarus and Germany were relegated to Division B.

=== 9th–12th playoffs ===
Playoffs
July 22, İzmir
Israel	61
Russia	66
July 22, İzmir
Bulgaria	80
Spain	72

Ninth place
July 23, İzmir
Russia	84
Bulgaria	88
Eleventh place
July 23, İzmir
Israel	74
Spain	82

=== 5th–8th playoffs ===
Playoffs
July 22, İzmir
Greece	50
France	76
July 22, İzmir
Croatia	81
Lithuania	62

Fifth place
July 23, İzmir
France	58
Croatia	63
Seventh place
July 23, İzmir
Greece	78
Lithuania	82

=== Championship ===
Semifinals
July 22, İzmir
Italy	83
Serbia and Montenegro	89
July 22, İzmir
Turkey	96
Slovenia	62

Final
July 23, İzmir
Serbia and Montenegro	64
Turkey	58
Third place
July 23, İzmir
Italy	75
Slovenia	83

== Final standings ==
Rank	Team
Gold medal	Serbia and Montenegro
Silver medal	Turkey
Bronze medal	Slovenia
4th	Italy
5th	Croatia
6th	France
7th	Lithuania
8th	Greece
9th	Bulgaria
10th	Russia
11th	Spain
12th	Israel
13th	Latvia
14th	Hungary
15th	Germany
16th	Belarus

2006 FIBA Europe U-20 Championship

Serbia and Montenegro
Second title

Team Roster

Tadija Dragićević, Milenko Tepić, Boris Bakić, Novica Veličković, Dragan Labović, Nenad Mijatović, Branko Jereminov, Miljan Rakić, Nikola Peković, Ivan Paunić, Nikola Dragović, and Ivan Maraš. Head coach: Miroslav Nikolić.

== Stats leaders ==
=== Points ===
Rank	Name	Points	Games	PPG
1.	(Latvia) Ernests Kalve	164	8	20.5
2.	(Slovenia) Emir Preldžič	162	8	20.3
3.	(Lithuania) Martynas Pocius	160	8	20.0
4.	(Bulgaria) Kaloyan Ivanov	153	8	19.1
5.	(France) Souarata Cissé	147	8	18.4

=== Rebounds ===
Rank	Name	Points	Games	RPG
1.	(Spain) Carlos Suárez	83	8	10.4
2.	(Slovenia) Emir Preldžić	75	8	9.4
3.	(Bulgaria) Kaloyan Ivanov	72	8	9.0
4.	(Bulgaria) Dejan Ivanov	70	8	8.8
5.	(Hungary) Miklós Szabó	67	8	8.4

=== Assists ===
Rank	Name	Points	Games	RPG
1.	(Latvia) Edgars Jeromanovs	50	8	6.3
2.	(Russia) Anton Ponkrashov	44	8	5.5
3.	(Lithuania) Mantas Kalnietis	38	8	4.8
4.	(Belarus) Maksim Shustau	30	8	3.8
5.	(Italy) Alessandro Piazza	30	8	3.8

== All-Tournament Team ==
- (Turkey) Ersan İlyasova
- (Turkey) Cenk Akyol
- (Slovenia) Emir Preldžić
- (Serbia and Montenegro) Nikola Peković
- (Italy) Luca Vitali
