= 2005 FIBA Europe Under-20 Championship =

International basketball competition

2005 FIBA U20 European Championship
8th FIBA Under-20 European Basketball Championship

Tournament details
- Host country: Russia
- Dates: July 8–17
- Teams: 16 (from 48 federations)
- Venue: 1 (in 1 host city)

Final positions
- Champions: Russia (1st title)

Tournament statistics
- MVP: (Russia) Nikita Kurbanov
- Top scorer: (Croatia) Markota (18.3)
- Top rebounds: (Croatia) Markota (10.8)
- Top assists: (Slovenia) Močnik (5.0)
- PPG (Team): Lithuania (81.4)
- RPG (Team): Latvia/Ukraine (41.1)
- APG (Team): Spain (14.0)

Official website
- Official website (archive)

The 2005 FIBA Europe Under-20 Championship was the eighth edition of the FIBA Europe Under-20 Championship. The city of Chekhov, in Russia, hosted the tournament. Russia won their first title.

Ukraine and the Czech Republic were relegated to Division B.

== Format change ==
For the first time, the format of the competition was changed. Four more teams entered the competition, and another round was played. The two last teams were relegated to Division B.

== Teams ==
- Belarus
- Croatia
- Czech Republic
- France
- Germany
- Greece
- Israel
- Italy
- Latvia
- Lithuania
- Russia
- Serbia and Montenegro
- Slovenia
- Spain
- Turkey
- Ukraine

== Preliminary round ==
The sixteen teams were allocated in four groups of four teams each.

Team advanced to Quarter-Final round
Team competed in Classification round

=== Group A ===
Team	Pld	W	L	PF	PA	Pts
Greece	3	3	0	239	176	6
Latvia	3	2	1	218	202	5
Ukraine	3	1	2	203	223	4
Germany	3	0	3	190	249	3

8 July 2005
Germany	60–89	Greece	Chekhov
Ukraine	72–73	Latvia	Chekhov
9 July 2005
Greece	87–60	Ukraine	Chekhov
Latvia	89–67	Germany	Chekhov
10 July 2005
Germany	63–71	Ukraine	Chekhov
Latvia	56–63	Greece	Chekhov

=== Group B ===
Team	Pld	W	L	PF	PA	Pts
Lithuania	3	3	0	303	183	6
Italy	3	2	1	214	214	5
Belarus	3	1	2	174	209	4
Czech Republic	3	0	3	161	246	3

8 July 2005
Belarus	72–52	Czech Republic	Chekhov
Italy	77–109	Lithuania	Chekhov
9 July 2005
Belarus	49–93	Lithuania	Chekhov
Czech Republic	52–73	Italy	Chekhov
10 July 2005
Czech Republic	57–101	Lithuania	Chekhov
Italy	64–53	Belarus	Chekhov

=== Group C ===
Team	Pld	W	L	PF	PA	Pts
Russia	3	2	1	303	183	5
France	3	2	1	214	214	5
Croatia	3	1	2	174	209	4
Slovenia	3	1	2	161	246	4

8 July 2005
France	66–57	Slovenia	Chekhov
Croatia	68–83	Russia	Chekhov
9 July 2005
Slovenia	62–81	Croatia	Chekhov
Russia	76–60	France	Chekhov
10 July 2005
France	76–57	Croatia	Chekhov
Russia	64–65	Slovenia	Chekhov

=== Group D ===
Team	Pld	W	L	PF	PA	Pts
Serbia and Montenegro	3	3	0	226	180	6
Israel	3	2	1	199	198	5
Spain	3	1	2	216	204	4
Turkey	3	0	3	170	229	3

8 July 2005
Serbia and Montenegro	80–73	Spain	Chekhov
Israel	73–65	Turkey	Chekhov
9 July 2005
Israel	71–65	Spain	Chekhov
Serbia and Montenegro	78–52	Turkey	Chekhov
10 July 2005
Israel	55–68	Serbia and Montenegro	Chekhov
Spain	78–53	Turkey	Chekhov

== Quarter-Final round ==
The eight teams were allocated in two groups of four teams each.

Team advanced to Semifinals
Team competed in 5th–8th playoffs

=== Group E ===
Team	Pld	W	L	PF	PA	Pts
Russia	3	3	0	233	185	6
Israel	3	1	2	183	201	4
Greece	3	1	2	180	202	4
Italy	3	1	2	207	215	4

12 July 2005
Greece	51–60	Israel	Chekhov
Italy	72–76	Russia	Chekhov
13 July 2005
Israel	60–64	Italy	Chekhov
Russia	71–50	Greece	Chekhov
14 July 2005
Greece	79–71	Italy	Chekhov
Russia	86–63	Israel	Chekhov

=== Group F ===
Team	Pld	W	L	PF	PA	Pts
Lithuania	3	2	1	228	204	5
Serbia and Montenegro	3	2	1	207	187	5
France	3	1	2	188	213	4
Latvia	3	1	2	184	203	4

12 July 2005
Latvia	53–73	Serbia and Montenegro	Chekhov
Lithuania	87–65	France	Chekhov
13 July 2005
France	56–54	Latvia	Chekhov
Serbia and Montenegro	62–67	Lithuania	Chekhov
14 July 2005
Latvia	77–74	Lithuania	Chekhov
France	67–72	Serbia and Montenegro	Chekhov

== Classification round ==
The eight teams were allocated in two groups of four teams each.

Team competed to 9th–12th playoffs
Team competed in 13th–16th playoffs

=== Group G ===
Team	Pld	W	L	PF	PA	Pts
Croatia	3	3	0	244	187	6
Turkey	3	2	1	211	206	5
Ukraine	3	1	2	199	229	4
Czech Republic	3	0	3	192	224	3

12 July 2005
Ukraine	59–68	Turkey	Chekhov
Czech Republic	56–72	Croatia	Chekhov
13 July 2005
Croatia	90–61	Ukraine	Chekhov
Turkey	73–65	Czech Republic	Chekhov
14 July 2005
Ukraine	79–71	Czech Republic	Chekhov
Croatia	82–70	Turkey	Chekhov

=== Group H ===
Team	Pld	W	L	PF	PA	Pts
Spain	3	3	0	227	163	6
Slovenia	3	2	1	205	185	5
Belarus	3	1	2	186	220	4
Germany	3	0	3	173	223	3

12 July 2005
Germany	52–73	Spain	Chekhov
Belarus	56–74	Slovenia	Chekhov
13 July 2005
Slovenia	76–61	Germany	Chekhov
Spain	86–56	Belarus	Chekhov
14 July 2005
Germany	60–74	Belarus	Chekhov
Slovenia	55–68	Spain	Chekhov

== Knockout stage ==
=== 13th–16th playoffs ===
Playoffs
July 16, Chekhov
Ukraine	65
Germany	81
July 16, Chekhov
Belarus	76
Czech Republic	59

Thirteenth place
July 17, Chekhov
Germany	59
Belarus	54
Fifteenth place
July 17, Chekhov
Ukraine	76
Czech Republic	50

Ukraine and the Czech Republic were relegated to Division B.

=== 9th–12th playoffs ===
Playoffs
July 16, Chekhov
Croatia	87
Slovenia	95
July 16, Chekhov
Spain	77
Turkey	61

Ninth place
July 17, Chekhov
Slovenia	69
Spain	80
Eleventh place
July 17, Chekhov
Croatia	83
Turkey	65

=== 5th–8th playoffs ===
Playoffs
July 16, Chekhov
Latvia	69
Greece	84
July 16, Chekhov
France	93
Italy	57

Fifth place
July 17, Chekhov
Greece	78
France	77
Seventh place
July 17, Chekhov
Latvia	85
Italy	69

=== Championship ===
Semifinals
July 16, Chekhov
Serbia and Montenegro	56
Russia	64
July 16, Chekhov
Lithuania	67
Israel	66

Final
July 17, Chekhov
Russia	61
Lithuania	53
Third place
July 17, Chekhov
Serbia and Montenegro	63
Israel	45

2005 FIBA Europe U-20 Championship

Russia
First title

== Final standings ==
Rank	Team
Gold medal	Russia
Silver medal	Lithuania
Bronze medal	Serbia and Montenegro
4th	Israel
5th	Greece
6th	France
7th	Latvia
8th	Italy
9th	Spain
10th	Slovenia
11th	Croatia
12th	Turkey
13th	Germany
14th	Belarus
15th	Ukraine
16th	Czech Republic

== Stats leaders ==
=== Points ===
Rank	Name	Points	Games	PPG
1.	(Croatia) Damir Markota	146	8	18.3
2.	(Israel) Lior Eliyahu	144	8	18.0
2.	(Lithuania) Renaldas Seibutis	139	8	17.4
4.	(Spain) Marc Gasol	134	8	16.8
5.	(Italy) Marco Belinelli	133	8	16.6

=== Rebounds ===
Rank	Name	Points	Games	RPG
1.	(Croatia) Damir Markota	86	8	10.8
2.	(Latvia) Kaspars Bērziņš	71	7	10.1
3.	(Ukraine) Oleksiy Pecherov	66	7	9.4
4.	(Spain) Marc Gasol	74	8	9.3
5.	(Serbia and Montenegro) Nikola Peković	73	8	9.1

=== Assists ===
Rank	Name	Points	Games	RPG
1.	(Slovenia) Jure Močnik	40	8	5.0
2.	(Spain) Sergio Rodríguez	33	8	4.1
3.	(Turkey) Barış Ermiş	26	7	3.7
4.	(Belarus) Dzmitry Akulich	29	8	3.6
5.	(France) Yannick Bokolo	26	5	3.3

== All-Tournament Team ==
- (Russia) Nikita Kurbanov
- (Lithuania) Renaldas Seibutis
- (Lithuania) Artūras Jomantas
- (Serbia and Montenegro) Luka Bogdanović
- (Israel) Lior Eliyahu
