= 2004 FIBA Europe Under-20 Championship =

International basketball competition

2004 FIBA U20 European Championship
7th FIBA Under-20 European Basketball Championship

Tournament details
- Host country: Czech Republic
- Dates: July 23 – August 1
- Teams: 12 (from 48 federations)
- Venue: 1 (in 1 host city)

Final positions
- Champions: Slovenia (2nd title)

Tournament statistics
- MVP: (Slovenia) Erazem Lorbek
- Top scorer: (Greece) Vasileiadis (25.5)
- Top rebounds: (Lithuania) Jankūnas (12.1)
- Top assists: (Spain) Sada (4.7)
- PPG (Team): Russia (82.5)
- RPG (Team): Lithuania (39.1)
- APG (Team): Czech Republic (13.5)

Official website
- Official website (archive)

The 2004 FIBA Europe Under-20 Championship was the seventh edition of the FIBA Europe Under-20 Championship. The city of Brno, in the Czech Republic, hosted the tournament. Slovenia won their second title.

== Teams ==
- Belarus
- Croatia
- Czech Republic
- Greece
- Israel
- Latvia
- Lithuania
- Russia
- Serbia and Montenegro
- Slovenia
- Spain
- Ukraine

== Qualification ==
Twenty-five national teams entered the qualifying round. They were allocated in five groups. The first two teams from groups A, B, C, D and the first three teams from group E qualified for the tournament, where they joined Czech Republic (qualified as hosts).

Group A

Team	Pld	W	L	PF	PA	PD	Pts
Spain	3	3	0	296	188	+108	6
Israel	3	2	1	267	240	+27	5
France	3	1	2	271	257	+14	4
Luxembourg	3	0	3	175	324	−149	3

Group B

Team	Pld	W	L	PF	PA	PD	Pts
Croatia	4	4	0	413	337	+76	8
Ukraine	4	3	1	348	281	+67	7
Italy	4	2	2	348	310	+38	6
Bulgaria	4	1	3	269	328	−59	5
Portugal	4	0	4	284	406	−122	4

Group C

Team	Pld	W	L	PF	PA	PD	Pts
Lithuania	4	4	0	401	302	+99	8
Latvia	4	3	1	339	272	+67	7
Germany	4	2	2	303	330	−27	6
Sweden	4	1	3	282	330	−48	5
Finland	4	0	4	265	356	−91	4

Group D

Team	Pld	W	L	PF	PA	PD	Pts
Russia	4	4	0	347	265	+82	8
Serbia and Montenegro	4	2	2	319	283	+36	6
Poland	4	2	2	301	295	+6	6
Slovakia	4	1	3	311	402	−91	5
Estonia	4	1	3	292	325	−33	5

Group E

Team	Pld	W	L	PF	PA	PD	Pts
Greece	5	5	0	442	332	+110	10
Slovenia	5	4	1	345	305	+40	9
Belarus	5	2	3	359	390	−31	7
Turkey	5	2	3	373	365	+8	7
Switzerland	5	1	4	283	365	−82	6
Hungary	5	1	4	355	400	−45	6

== Preliminary round ==
The twelve teams were allocated in two groups of six teams each.

Team advanced to Quarterfinals
Team competed in 9th–12th playoffs

=== Group A ===
Team	Pld	W	L	PF	PA	Pts
Russia	5	4	1	412	374	9
Israel	5	3	2	404	407	8
Czech Republic	5	2	3	353	379	7
Latvia	5	2	3	361	372	7
Spain	5	2	3	388	378	7
Croatia	5	2	3	384	392	7

23 July 2004
Latvia	68–72	Israel	Brno
Russia	89–72	Czech Republic	Brno
Spain	82–75	Croatia	Brno
24 July 2004
Israel	83–90	Russia	Brno
Croatia	69–76	Latvia	Brno
Czech Republic	69–65	Spain	Brno
25 July 2004
Russia	78–73	Latvia	Brno
Spain	77–86	Israel	Brno
Czech Republic	64–82	Croatia	Brno
27 July 2004
Croatia	54–86	Russia	Brno
Latvia	79–72	Spain	Brno
Israel	78–68	Czech Republic	Brno
28 July 2004
Spain	92–69	Russia	Brno
Czech Republic	80–65	Latvia	Brno
Israel	84–104	Croatia	Brno

=== Group B ===
Team	Pld	W	L	PF	PA	Pts
Greece	5	4	1	429	380	9
Lithuania	5	4	1	454	427	9
Serbia and Montenegro	5	4	1	377	349	9
Slovenia	5	2	3	389	398	7
Ukraine	5	1	4	377	404	6
Belarus	5	0	5	331	399	5

23 July 2004
Lithuania	81–47	Belarus	Brno
Ukraine	62–90	Serbia and Montenegro	Brno
Greece	91–84	Slovenia	Brno
24 July 2004
Slovenia	100–82	Ukraine	Brno
Belarus	60–81	Greece	Brno
Serbia and Montenegro	80–72	Lithuania	Brno
25 July 2004
Belarus	55–84	Slovenia	Brno
Lithuania	93–78	Ukraine	Brno
Greece	72–59	Serbia and Montenegro	Brno
27 July 2004
Serbia and Montenegro	76–62	Belarus	Brno
Slovenia	65–69	Lithuania	Brno
Ukraine	82–91	Greece	Brno
28 July 2004
Serbia and Montenegro	76–47	Slovenia	Brno
Greece	67–73	Lithuania	Brno
Belarus	67–73	Ukraine	Brno

== Knockout stage ==
=== 9th–12th playoffs ===
Playoffs
July 30, Brno
Spain	59
Belarus	84
July 30, Brno
Ukraine	67
Croatia	65

Ninth place
July 31, Brno
Belarus	80
Ukraine	76
Eleventh place
July 31, Brno
Spain	78
Croatia	71

=== Championship ===
Quarterfinals
July 30, Brno
Russia	67
Slovenia	74
July 30, Brno
Lithuania	99
Czech Republic	72
July 30, Brno
Serbia and Montenegro	82
Israel	83
July 30, Brno
Greece	87
Latvia	66

Semifinals
July 31, Brno
Slovenia	97
Lithuania	57
July 31, Brno
Israel	88
Greece	82

Final
August 1, Brno
Slovenia	66
Israel	61
Third place
August 1, Brno
Lithuania	92
Greece	63

==== 5th–8th playoffs ====
Playoffs
July 31, Brno
Russia	95
Czech Republic	62
July 31, Brno
Latvia	71
Serbia and Montenegro	74

Fifth place
August 1, Brno
Russia	86
Serbia and Montenegro	101
Seventh place
August 1, Brno
Czech Republic	79
Latvia	100

2004 FIBA Europe U-20 Championship

Slovenia
Second title

== Final standings ==
Rank	Team
Gold medal	Slovenia
Silver medal	Israel
Bronze medal	Lithuania
4th	Greece
5th	Serbia and Montenegro
6th	Russia
7th	Latvia
8th	Czech Republic
9th	Belarus
10th	Ukraine
11th	Spain
12th	Croatia

== Stats leaders ==
=== Points ===
Rank	Name	Points	Games	PPG
1.	(Greece) Kostas Vasileiadis	204	8	25.5
2.	(Serbia and Montenegro) Ivan Koljević	163	8	20.4
2.	(Israel) Yotam Halperin	163	8	20.4
4.	(Belarus) Vladimir Veremeenko	140	7	20.0
5.	(Spain) Marc Gasol	128	7	18.3

=== Rebounds ===
Rank	Name	Points	Games	RPG
1.	(Lithuania) Paulius Jankūnas	97	8	12.1
2.	(Belarus) Vladimir Veremeenko	77	7	11.0
3.	(Spain) Víctor Sada	64	7	9.1
4.	(Czech Republic) David Steffel	72	8	9.0
5.	(Spain) Marc Gasol	57	7	8.1

=== Assists ===
Rank	Name	Points	Games	RPG
1.	(Spain) Víctor Sada	30	7	4.3
2.	(Lithuania) Artūras Jomantas	31	8	3.9
3.	(Ukraine) Dmytro Diatlovskyi	27	7	3.9
4.	(Croatia) Petar Ćosić	23	7	3.3
5.	(Greece) Vassilis Xanthopoulos	25	8	3.1

== All-Tournament Team ==
- (Israel) Yotam Halperin
- (Serbia and Montenegro) Ivan Koljević
- (Greece) Kostas Vasileiadis
- (Lithuania) Linas Kleiza
- (Slovenia) Erazem Lorbek (MVP)
