= Italy men's national under-20 basketball team =

Italy
- FIBA zone: FIBA Europe
- National federation: Federazione Italiana Pallacanestro
- Coach: Andrea Capobianco

U21 World Championship
- Appearances: 1
- Medals: None

U20 EuroBasket
- Appearances: 25
- Medals: Gold: 3 (1992, 2013, 2025); Silver: 2 (1994, 2011); Bronze: 1 (2007)
Home	Away

The Italy men's national under-20 basketball team is the national representative for Italy in international under-20 men's basketball tournaments. They are administered by the Federazione Italiana Pallacanestro.

The Italian U20 team competes at the FIBA U20 EuroBasket. In 1993, the team competed at the FIBA U22 World Championship.

== Competitive record ==
=== FIBA U20 EuroBasket ===
Year	Position
(Greece) 1992	1st
(Slovenia) 1994	2nd
(Turkey) 1996	5th
(Italy) 1998	6th
(North Macedonia) 2000	DNQ
(Lithuania) 2002	11th
(Czech Republic) 2004	DNQ
(Russia) 2005	8th
(Turkey) 2006	4th
(Slovenia) (Italy) 2007	3rd
(Latvia) 2008	6th
(Greece) 2009	4th
(Croatia) 2010	10th
(Spain) 2011	2nd
(Slovenia) 2012	10th
(Estonia) 2013	1st
(Greece) 2014	10th
(Italy) 2015	9th
(Finland) 2016	5th
(Greece) 2017	13th
(Germany) 2018	8th
(Israel) 2019	13th
(Montenegro) 2022	9th
(Greece) 2023	9th
(Poland) 2024	9th
(Greece) 2025	1st
(Slovenia) 2026	13th
Total	25/27

=== FIBA U21 World Championship ===
Year	Position
(Spain) 1993	4th

== See also ==
- Italy men's national basketball team
- Italy men's national under-19 basketball team
- Italy men's national under-17 basketball team
