= Russia men's national under-20 basketball team =

Youth basketball team representing Russia

Russia
- FIBA zone: FIBA Europe
- National federation: Russian Basketball Federation

U20 EuroBasket
- Appearances: 16
- Medals: Gold: 1 (2005)

U20 EuroBasket Division B
- Appearances: 4
- Medals: None

The Russia men's national under-20 basketball team is a national basketball team of Russia, administered by the Russian Basketball Federation. It represented the country in international men's under-20 basketball competitions.

After the 2022 Russian invasion of Ukraine, FIBA banned Russian teams and officials from participating in FIBA basketball competitions.

== FIBA U20 EuroBasket participations ==
Year	Division A	Division B
1994	7th	
1996	8th	
2000	9th	
2002	4th	
2004	6th	
2005	1st place, gold medalist(s)	
2006	10th	
2007	4th	
2008	9th	
2009	9th	

Year	Division A	Division B
2010	5th	
2011	4th	
2012	11th	
2013	4th	
2014	13th	
2015	16th	
2016		9th
2017		4th
2018		4th
2019		4th

== See also ==
- Russia men's national basketball team
- Russia men's national under-19 basketball team
- Russia women's national under-20 basketball team
