= Greece men's national under-20 basketball team =

Greece
- Joined FIBA: 1932
- FIBA zone: FIBA Europe
- Coach: Kostas Papadopoulos

U20 EuroBasket
- Appearances: 26
- Medals: Gold: 3 (2002, 2009, 2017); Silver: 2 (1992, 2010); Bronze: 2 (2023, 2024)

U20 EuroBasket Division B
- Appearances: 1
- Medals: Bronze: 1 (2016)
Home	Away

The Greece men's national under-20 basketball team (Greek: Εθνική ομάδα καλαθοσφαίρισης Νέων Ανδρών Ελλάδας, (Greek young men's national basketball team) is the representative for Greece in international under-20 men's basketball competitions, and it is organized and run by the Hellenic Basketball Federation (E.O.K.). The Greece men's national under-20 basketball team represents Greece at the FIBA U20 EuroBasket. It was previously known as the Greek Under-22 national basketball team.

== FIBA U20 EuroBasket participations ==
Year	Position
(Greece) 1992	2nd place, silver medalist(s)
(Slovenia) 1994	4th
(Turkey) 1996	6th
(Italy) 1998	11th
(North Macedonia) 2000	7th
(Lithuania) 2002	1st place, gold medalist(s)
(Czech Republic) 2004	4th
(Russia) 2005	5th
(Turkey) 2006	8th
(Slovenia) 2007	13th
(Latvia) 2008	13th
(Greece) 2009	1st place, gold medalist(s)
(Croatia) 2010	2nd place, silver medalist(s)
(Spain) 2011	12th
(Slovenia) 2012	8th
(Estonia) 2013	5th
(Greece) 2014	6th
(Italy) 2015	18th
(Finland) 2016	Div. B (3rd)
(Greece) 2017	1st place, gold medalist(s)
(Germany) 2018	13th
(Israel) 2019	9th
(Montenegro) 2022	12th
(Greece) 2023	3rd place, bronze medalist(s)
(Poland) 2024	3rd place, bronze medalist(s)
(Greece) 2025	5th
(Slovenia) 2026	5th
Total	26/27

== Team ==
Roster for the 2024 FIBA U20 EuroBasket

Greece U20 national basketball team roster
Players
Coaches

Pos.	No.	Name	Age – Date of birth	Height	Club	Ctr.
PG	3	Ioannis Karakostas	19 – 4 February 2004	1.93 m (6 ft 4 in)	AS Papagou	(Greece)
G	5	Nikolaos Plotas	19 – 12 June 2004	1.95 m (6 ft 5 in)	Promitheas	(Greece)
G	6	Theodoros Konstantinidis	19 – 20 February 2004	1.94 m (6 ft 4 in)	PAOK	(Greece)
SF	8	Evdoxios Kapetakis	18 – 9 June 2005	1.97 m (6 ft 6 in)	Karditsa	(Greece)
G	10	Charilaos Paraskevopoulos	19 – 3 January 2005	1.94 m (6 ft 4 in)	APAS "Ta Fanaria"	(Greece)
G	12	Christos Bountouris	20 – 16 January 2004	1.92 m (6 ft 4 in)	GS Sofadon	(Greece)
SG	14	Nikolaos Vasileiou	18 – 3 May 2005	1.95 m (6 ft 5 in)	Promitheas	(Greece)
PF	16	Dimitris Deimezis	20 – 16 January 2004	2.02 m (6 ft 8 in)	Lavrio bc	(Greece)
PF	20	Alexandros Samodurov	18 – 20 April 2005	2.11 m (6 ft 11 in)	Panathinaikos	(Greece)
C	21	Alexis Kamperidis	18 – 20 June 2005	2.08 m (6 ft 10 in)	GS Sofadon	(Greece)
C	33	Apostolos Ioannou	19 – 24 February 2004	2.07 m (6 ft 9 in)	Esperos Lamias BC	(Greece)
PF	35	Vangelis Zougris	19 – 14 October 2004	2.02 m (6 ft 8 in)	Peristeri	(Greece)

Head coach

- (Greece) Konstantinos Papadopoulos

Assistant coach(es)

- (Greece) Dimitrios Gkofas
- (Greece) Grigorios Giasaris
- (Greece) Vasileios Skropolithas

Legend

- Club – describes last
  club before the tournament
- Age – describes age
  on 16 July 2024

== See also ==
- Greece men's national basketball team
- Greece men's national under-21 basketball team
- Greece women's national under-20 basketball team
