= 2008 FIBA Europe Under-20 Championship =

International basketball competition

2008 FIBA U20 European Championship
11th FIBA Under-20 European Basketball Championship

Tournament details
- Host country: Latvia
- Dates: August 1–10
- Teams: 16 (from 48 federations)
- Venue: 1 (in 1 host city)

Final positions
- Champions: Serbia (2nd title)

Tournament statistics
- MVP: (Serbia) Miroslav Raduljica
- Top scorer: (Montenegro) Dašić (22.8)
- Top rebounds: (Serbia) Raduljica (10.9)
- Top assists: (Spain) Colom (6.1)
- PPG (Team): Lithuania (87.8)
- RPG (Team): France (46.9)
- APG (Team): Greece (19.0)

Official website
- Official website (archive)

The 2008 FIBA Europe Under-20 Championship was the eleventh edition of the FIBA Europe Under-20 Championship. The city of Riga, in Latvia, hosted the tournament. Serbia won their second title.

Bulgaria and Georgia were relegated to Division B.

== Teams ==
- Bulgaria
- Croatia
- France
- Georgia
- Greece
- Israel
- Italy
- Latvia
- Lithuania
- Montenegro
- Russia
- Serbia
- Slovenia
- Spain
- Turkey
- Ukraine

== Preliminary round ==
The sixteen teams were allocated in four groups of four teams each.

Team advanced to Qualifying round
Team competed in Classification round

=== Group A ===
Team	Pld	W	L	PF	PA	Pts
Lithuania	3	3	0	271	237	6
Ukraine	3	1	2	263	258	4 (1–1 +7)
Croatia	3	1	2	234	256	4 (1–1 –3)
Greece	3	1	2	218	235	4 (1–1 –4)

1 August 2008
Ukraine	91–93	Lithuania	Riga
Croatia	74–67	Greece	Riga
2 August 2008
Lithuania	88–69	Croatia	Riga
Greece	74–71	Ukraine	Riga
3 August 2008
Croatia	91–101	Ukraine	Riga
Lithuania	90–77	Greece	Riga

=== Group B ===
Team	Pld	W	L	PF	PA	Pts
Italy	3	2	1	198	200	5
Turkey	3	2	1	207	182	5
Israel	3	1	2	216	224	4
Georgia	3	1	2	201	216	4

1 August 2008
Georgia	51–69	Turkey	Riga
Israel	67–69	Italy	Riga
2 August 2008
Turkey	75–65	Israel	Riga
Italy	63–70	Georgia	Riga
3 August 2008
Turkey	63–66	Italy	Riga
Israel	84–80	Georgia	Riga

=== Group C ===
Team	Pld	W	L	PF	PA	Pts
Montenegro	3	3	0	227	197	6
Spain	3	2	1	222	204	5
Latvia	3	1	2	205	204	4
Bulgaria	3	0	3	219	268	3

1 August 2008
Montenegro	74–65	Spain	Riga
Latvia	95–67	Bulgaria	Riga
2 August 2008
Bulgaria	68–76	Montenegro	Riga
Spain	60–46	Latvia	Riga
3 August 2008
Spain	97–84	Bulgaria	Riga
Latvia	64–77	Montenegro	Riga

=== Group D ===
Team	Pld	W	L	PF	PA	Pts
France	3	3	0	262	197	6
Serbia	3	2	1	243	236	5
Russia	3	1	2	234	241	4
Slovenia	3	0	3	193	258	3

1 August 2008
Russia	75–84	Serbia	Riga
Slovenia	46–91	France	Riga
2 August 2008
Serbia	90–78	Slovenia	Riga
France	88–82	Russia	Riga
3 August 2008
Russia	77–69	Slovenia	Riga
France	83–69	Serbia	Riga

== Qualifying round ==
The twelve teams were allocated in two groups of six teams each. The results of the games between the teams from the same group in the preliminary round were taken into account for the ranking in this round.

Team advanced to Semifinals
Team competed in the 5th–8th playoffs
Team competed in the 9th–12th playoffs

=== Group E ===
Team	Pld	W	L	PF	PA	Pts
Lithuania	5	4	1	427	393	9 (1–1 +6)
Turkey	5	4	1	371	344	9 (1–1 +1)
Italy	5	4	1	401	331	9 (1–1 –7)
Ukraine	5	2	3	409	437	7
Croatia	5	1	4	352	402	6
Israel	5	0	5	332	385	5

5 August 2008
Turkey	86–73	Ukraine	Riga
Israel	70–77	Lithuania	Riga
Croatia	52–88	Italy	Riga
6 August 2008
Lithuania	80–84	Turkey	Riga
Ukraine	60–99	Italy	Riga
Israel	62–80	Croatia	Riga
7 August 2008
Turkey	63–60	Croatia	Riga
Ukraine	84–68	Israel	Riga
Italy	79–89	Lithuania	Riga

=== Group F ===
Team	Pld	W	L	PF	PA	Pts
Serbia	5	4	1	405	371	9
Spain	5	3	2	368	343	8 (1–1 +11)
Montenegro	5	3	2	364	333	8 (1–1 +5)
France	5	3	2	382	401	8 (1–1 –16)
Latvia	5	2	3	344	362	7
Russia	5	0	5	346	399	5

5 August 2008
Russia	63–81	Montenegro	Riga
Serbia	80–73	Spain	Riga
Latvia	96–73	France	Riga
6 August 2008
Montenegro	70–75	Serbia	Riga
Spain	92–72	France	Riga
Russia	55–68	Latvia	Riga
7 August 2008
Spain	78–71	Russia	Riga
France	66–62	Montenegro	Riga
Serbia	97–70	Latvia	Riga

== Classification round ==
Team relegated to Division B

=== Group G ===
Team	Pld	W	L	PF	PA	Pts
Greece	3	2	1	265	201	5 (1–1 +34)
Slovenia	3	2	1	246	232	5 (1–1 +5)
Bulgaria	3	2	1	227	251	5 (1–1 –39)
Georgia	3	1	2	224	278	3

10 July 2007
Greece	70–77	Slovenia	Riga
Georgia	75–90	Bulgaria	Riga
12 July 2007
Bulgaria	57–98	Greece	Riga
Slovenia	91–82	Georgia	Riga
14 July 2007
Greece	97–67	Georgia	Riga
Bulgaria	80–78	Slovenia	Riga

== Knockout stage ==
=== 9th–12th playoffs ===
Playoffs
August 9, Riga
Russia	79
Croatia	69
August 9, Riga
Israel	86
Latvia	83

Ninth place
August 10, Riga
Russia	83
Israel	67
Eleventh place
August 10, Riga
Croatia	70
Latvia	94

=== 5th–8th playoffs ===
Playoffs
August 9, Riga
Montenegro	90
Ukraine	53
August 9, Riga
Italy	71
France	56

Fifth place
August 10, Riga
Montenegro	79
Italy	63
Seventh place
August 10, Riga
Ukraine	78
France	96

=== Championship ===
Semifinals
August 9, Riga
Serbia	90
Turkey	69
August 9, Riga
Lithuania	96
Spain	79

Final
August 10, Riga
Serbia	96
Lithuania	89
Third place
August 10, Riga
Turkey	72
Spain	91

== Final standings ==
Rank	Team
Gold medal	Serbia
Silver medal	Lithuania
Bronze medal	Spain
4th	Turkey
5th	Montenegro
6th	Italy
7th	France
8th	Ukraine
9th	Russia
10th	Israel
11th	Latvia
12th	Croatia
13th	Greece
14th	Slovenia
15th	Bulgaria
16th	Georgia

2008 FIBA Europe U-20 Championship

Serbia
Second title

;Team roster

Mladen Jeremić, Stefan Sinovec, Petar Despotović, Nikola Koprivica, Marko Kešelj, Dušan Katnić, Stefan Stojačić, Bojan Radetić, Boban Marjanović, Miroslav Raduljica, Marko Čakarević, and Milan Mačvan. Head coach: Slobodan Klipa.

== Stats leaders ==
=== Points ===
Rank	Name	Points	Games	PPG
1.	(Montenegro) Vladimir Dašić	182	8	22.8
2.	(Georgia (country)) Giorgi Shermadini	129	6	21.5
3.	(Lithuania) Martynas Gecevičius	164	8	20.5
3.	(Russia) Alexey Shved	151	8	18.9
5.	(Bulgaria) Ivan Lilov	113	6	18.8

=== Rebounds ===
Rank	Name	Points	Games	RPG
1.	(Serbia) Miroslav Raduljica	87	8	10.9
2.	(Georgia (country)) Giorgi Shermadini	63	6	10.5
3.	(Montenegro) Vladimir Dašić	71	8	8.9
4.	(Croatia) Miro Bilan	69	8	8.6
5.	(Georgia (country)) Levan Shengelia	51	6	8.5

=== Assists ===
Rank	Name	Points	Games	APG
1.	(Spain) Joaquin Colom	49	8	6.1
2.	(Georgia (country)) Giorgi Gaprindashvili	27	5	5.4
3.	(Turkey) Doğuş Balbay	39	8	4.9
4.	(Lithuania) Žygimantas Janavičius	38	8	4.8
5.	(Ukraine) Vladyslav Tonchenko	37	8	4.6

== All-Tournament Team ==
- (Serbia) Miroslav Raduljica
- (Spain) Joaquin Colom
- (Lithuania) Martynas Gecevičius
- (Spain) Víctor Claver
- (Montenegro) Vladimir Dašić

== See also ==
- U20 European Championship Men 2008 – Division B
