= Latvia men's national under-20 basketball team =

Latvia
- FIBA zone: FIBA Europe
- National federation: Latvian Basketball Association

U20 EuroBasket
- Appearances: 17
- Medals: Silver: 1 (2013)

U20 EuroBasket Division B
- Appearances: 5
- Medals: Gold: 1 (2025); Bronze: 1 (2018)
Home	Away

The Latvia men's national under-20 basketball team (Latvian: Latvijas jaunatnes basketbola izlase līdz 20 gadu vecumam) is a national basketball team of Latvia, administered by the Latvian Basketball Association. It represents the country in international under-20 men's basketball competitions.

== FIBA U20 EuroBasket participations ==
Year	Division A	Division B
1998	12th	
2004	7th	
2005	7th	
2006	13th	
2007	14th	
2008	11th	
2009	10th	
2010	11th	
2011	8th	
2012	6th	
2013	2nd place, silver medalist(s)	

Year	Division A	Division B
2014	16th	
2015	5th	
2016	6th	
2017	16th	
2018		3rd place, bronze medalist(s)
2019	16th	
2022		6th
2023		13th
2024		13th
2025		1st place, gold medalist(s)
2026	12th	

== See also ==
- Latvia men's national basketball team
- Latvia men's national under-19 basketball team
- Latvia women's national under-20 basketball team
