= Croatia men's national under-20 basketball team =

Croatia
- FIBA zone: FIBA Europe
- National federation: Croatian Basketball Federation

U21 World Championship
- Appearances: 1
- Medals: Silver: 1 (2001)

U20 EuroBasket
- Appearances: 19
- Medals: Silver: 1 (2018)

U20 EuroBasket Division B
- Appearances: 5
- Medals: Gold: 1 (2012); Silver: 2 (2017, 2025)

The Croatia men's national under-20 basketball team is a national basketball team of Croatia, administered by the Croatian Basketball Federation. It represents the country in international under-20 men's basketball competitions.

== FIBA U20 EuroBasket participations ==
| Year | Division A | Division B |
|---|---|---|
| 1998 | 9th | |
| 2000 | 4th | |
| 2002 | 8th | |
| 2004 | 12th | |
| 2005 | 11th | |
| 2006 | 5th | |
| 2007 | 10th | |
| 2008 | 12th | |
| 2009 | 8th | |
| 2010 | 4th | |
| 2011 | 16th | |
| 2012 | | 1st place, gold medalist(s) |

| Year | Division A | Division B |
|---|---|---|
| 2013 | 12th | |
| 2014 | 4th | |
| 2015 | 17th | |
| 2016 | | 4th |
| 2017 | | 2nd place, silver medalist(s) |
| 2018 | 2nd place, silver medalist(s) | |
| 2019 | 7th | |
| 2022 | 7th | |
| 2023 | 14th | |
| 2024 | | 10th |
| 2025 | | 2nd place, silver medalist(s) |
| 2026 | 7th | |

== FIBA Under-21 World Championship participations ==
| Year | Result |
|---|---|
| 2001 | 2nd place, silver medalist(s) |

== See also ==
- Croatia men's national basketball team
- Croatia men's national under-18 and under-19 basketball team
- Croatia women's national under-20 basketball team
