= Serbia and Montenegro men's national under-20 basketball team =

Serbia and Montenegro
- FIBA zone: FIBA Europe
- National federation: Basketball Federation of Serbia and Montenegro

U20 EuroBasket
- Appearances: 7
- Medals: Gold: 2 (1998, 2006); Bronze: 2 (1996, 2005)

The Serbia and Montenegro men's national under-20 basketball team was a national basketball team of Serbia and Montenegro, administered by the Basketball Federation of Serbia and Montenegro. It represented the country in international under-20 men's basketball competitions. Initially, the team played under the name FR Yugoslavia.

== FIBA U20 EuroBasket participations ==
Year	Result in Division A
1996	3rd place, bronze medalist(s)
1998	1st place, gold medalist(s)
2000	5th
2002	7th
2004	5th
2005	3rd place, bronze medalist(s)
2006	1st place, gold medalist(s)
