= Lithuania men's national under-20 basketball team =

Lithuania
- FIBA ranking: 6th (As of 13 Dec 2025)
- Joined FIBA: 1936
- FIBA zone: FIBA Europe
- National federation: Lithuanian Basketball Federation
- Nickname(s): Basketball: The Second Religion, Game of the Nation

FIBA U20 EuroBasket
- Appearances: 25
- Medals: Gold: 2 (1996, 2012); Silver: 5 (2005, 2008, 2016, 2022, 2025); Bronze: 1 (2004)
Home	Away

The Lithuania men's national under-20 basketball team (Lithuanian: Lietuvos nacionalinė vaikinų jaunimo iki 20 krepšinio rinktinė), is the representative for Lithuania in international under-20 men's basketball competitions, and it is organized and run by the Lithuanian Basketball Federation. The Lithuania men's national under-20 basketball team represents Lithuania at the FIBA U20 EuroBasket.

The 2012 FIBA Europe Under-20 Championship champions generation (born 1992), led by Jonas Valančiūnas, won every single age-restricted tournament they have competed in. Consequently, the unique Lithuanian generation was nicknamed "Auksinis Lietuvos jaunimas" (English: The Golden Lithuanian Youth).

== FIBA U20 EuroBasket record ==
Year	Pos.	Pld	W	L
(Greece) 1992	Did not participate			
(Slovenia) 1994	Did not qualify			
(Turkey) 1996	1st	7	6	1
(Italy) 1998	8th	8	3	5
(North Macedonia) 2000	10th	5	2	3
(Lithuania) 2002	5th	8	4	4
(Czech Republic) 2004	3rd	8	6	2
(Russia) 2005	2nd	8	6	2
(Turkey) 2006	7th	8	3	5
(Slovenia) 2007	11th	8	2	6
(Latvia) 2008	2nd	8	6	2
(Greece) 2009	5th	9	6	3
(Croatia) 2010	9th	8	5	3
(Spain) 2011	14th	9	4	5
(Slovenia) 2012	1st	9	6	3
(Estonia) 2013	7th	10	6	4
(Greece) 2014	5th	10	7	3
(Italy) 2015	7th	10	5	5
(Finland) 2016	2nd	7	4	3
(Greece) 2017	6th	7	4	3
(Germany) 2018	9th	7	6	1
(Israel) 2019	5th	7	5	2
(Montenegro) 2022	2nd	7	4	3
(Greece) 2023	8th	7	4	3
(Poland) 2024	5th	7	5	2
(Greece) 2025	2nd	7	4	3
(Greece) 2026	9th	7	5	2
Total	25/27	196	118	78

== Current roster ==
2019 FIBA U20 European Championship

Lithuania men's national under-20 basketball team roster
Players
Coaches

Pos.	No.	Nat.	Name	Ht.	Wt.	Age
PG	1	Arnas Velička	19 – 10 December 1999	1.92 m (6 ft 4 in)	BC Žalgiris	(Lithuania)
SF	3	Tadas Vaičiūnas	20 – 21 April 1999	2.00 m (6 ft 7 in)	BC Lietkabelis	(Lithuania)
SG	4	Justinas Leganovič	19 – 15 October 1999	1.92 m (6 ft 4 in)	West Nottingham Academy	(United States)
SG	5	Lukas Uleckas	19 – 6 August 1999	1.95 m (6 ft 5 in)	BC Žalgiris	(Lithuania)
G	6	Ernestas Jonkus	20 – 3 July 1999	1.87 m (6 ft 2 in)	BC Gargždai-SC	(Lithuania)
SG	7	Ignas Sargiūnas	19 – 11 September 1999	1.93 m (6 ft 4 in)	Colorado State University	(United States)
SF	10	Vitalijus Kozys	20 – 30 April 1999	2.00 m (6 ft 7 in)	BC Žalgiris	(Lithuania)
PF	11	Paulius Poška	20 – 23 March 1999	2.04 m (6 ft 8 in)	BC Šilutė	(Lithuania)
PF	18	Grantas Vasiliauskas	20 – 10 January 1999	2.02 m (6 ft 8 in)	BC Jonava	(Lithuania)
F/C	35	Danielius Lavrinovičius	20 – 22 January 1999	2.02 m (6 ft 8 in)	Artland Dragons	(Germany)
F	92	Justas Sakalauskas	20 – 6 February 1999	2.00 m (6 ft 7 in)	BC Vytis	(Lithuania)
PG	99	Marius Valinskas	20 – 4 May 1999	1.87 m (6 ft 2 in)	BC Lietkabelis	(Lithuania)

Head coach

- (Lithuania) Donaldas Kairys

Legend

- (C) Team captain
- Injured

- Roster
Updated: 08-07-2019

== Past rosters ==
1996 FIBA Europe Under-20 Championship – Gold medal (gold)

Tomas Masiulis, Evaldas Jocys, Nerijus Karlikanovas, Mindaugas Timinskas, Kęstutis Šeštokas, Ramūnas Petraitis, Kęstutis Marčiulionis, Dainius Adomaitis, Giedrius Aidietis, Šarūnas Jasikevičius, Andrius Jurkūnas, Virginijus Praškevičius

2004 FIBA Europe Under-20 Championship – Bronze medal (bronze)

Artūras Jomantas, Martynas Mažeika, Laurynas Pečiukaitis, Linas Kleiza, Jonas Mačiulis, Steponas Babrauskas, Valdas Dabkus, Paulius Jankūnas, Paulius Joneliūnas, Marius Prekevičius, Darius Šilinskis, Linas Lekavičius, Mikhail Anisimov (Head coach: Ramūnas Butautas)

2005 FIBA Europe Under-20 Championship – Silver medal (silver)

Artūras Jomantas, Martynas Mažeika, Rolandas Alijevas, Modestas Šidlauskas, Juozas Ramanauskas, Jonas Mačiulis, Renaldas Seibutis, Mantas Kalnietis, Mantas Ruikis, Laimonas Kisielius, Aurimas Truškauskas, Tomas Jasiulionis (Head coach: Rimas Kurtinaitis)

2008 FIBA Europe Under-20 Championship – Silver medal (silver)

Martynas Gecevičius, Pranas Skurdauskas, Rokas Ūzas, Marius Valukonis, Vaidas Čepukaitis, Žygimantas Janavičius, Adas Juškevičius, Vytenis Lipkevičius, Šarūnas Vasiliauskas, Lukas Brazdauskis, Donatas Motiejūnas, Evaldas Zabas (Head coach: Rimvydas Samulėnas)

2012 FIBA Europe Under-20 Championship – Gold medal (gold)

Evaldas Aniulis, Vytenis Čižauskas, Rolandas Jakštas, Deividas Pukis, Dovydas Redikas, Žygimantas Skučas, Edgaras Ulanovas, Tautvydas Sabonis, Arnas Butkevičius, Egidijus Mockevičius, Rokas Giedraitis, Paulius Vaitiekūnas (Head coach: Kazys Maksvytis)

2016 FIBA U20 European Championship – Silver medal (silver)

Ignas Fiodorovas, Margiris Normantas, Tautvydas Paliukėnas, Edvinas Rupkus, Martynas Varnas, Regimantas Miniotas, Laurynas Beliauskas, Laurynas Birutis, Martynas Echodas, Martynas Sajus, Kristupas Žemaitis, Giedrius Stankevičius (Head coach: Tomas Masiulis)

2022 FIBA U20 European Championship – Silver medal (silver)

Edgaras Preibys, Augustas Marčiulionis, Hubertas Pivorius, Jokūbas Rubinas, Mantas Rubštavičius, Dominykas Stenionis, Ugnius Jaruševičius, Augustinas Kiudulas, Dovydas Butka, Martynas Tamulevičius, Nedas Montvila, Tadas Budrys (Head coach: Mindaugas Noreika)

2025 FIBA U20 EuroBasket – Silver medal (silver)

Mantas Juzėnas, Armandas Bancevičius, Jokūbas Rudaitis, Justas Stonkus, Nikas Stuknys, Nedas Raupelis, Mantas Kocanas, Gantas Križanauskas, Aleksas Bieliauskas, Mantas Laurencikas, Deividas Žukauskas, Kristupas Lesčiauskas (Head coach: Darius Songaila)

== See also ==
- Lithuania men's national basketball team
- Lithuania men's national under-18 and under-19 basketball team
- Lithuania women's national under-20 basketball team
