= Turkey men's national under-20 basketball team =

Turkey
- FIBA zone: FIBA Europe
- National federation: Turkish Basketball Federation
- Coach: Serhan Kavut

U21 World Championship
- Appearances: 1
- Medals: None

U20 EuroBasket
- Appearances: 25
- Medals: Gold: 1 (2014); Silver: 1 (2006); Bronze: 3 (1998, 2015, 2016)

U20 EuroBasket Division B
- Appearances: 1
- Medals: Bronze: 1 (2025)
| Home | Away |

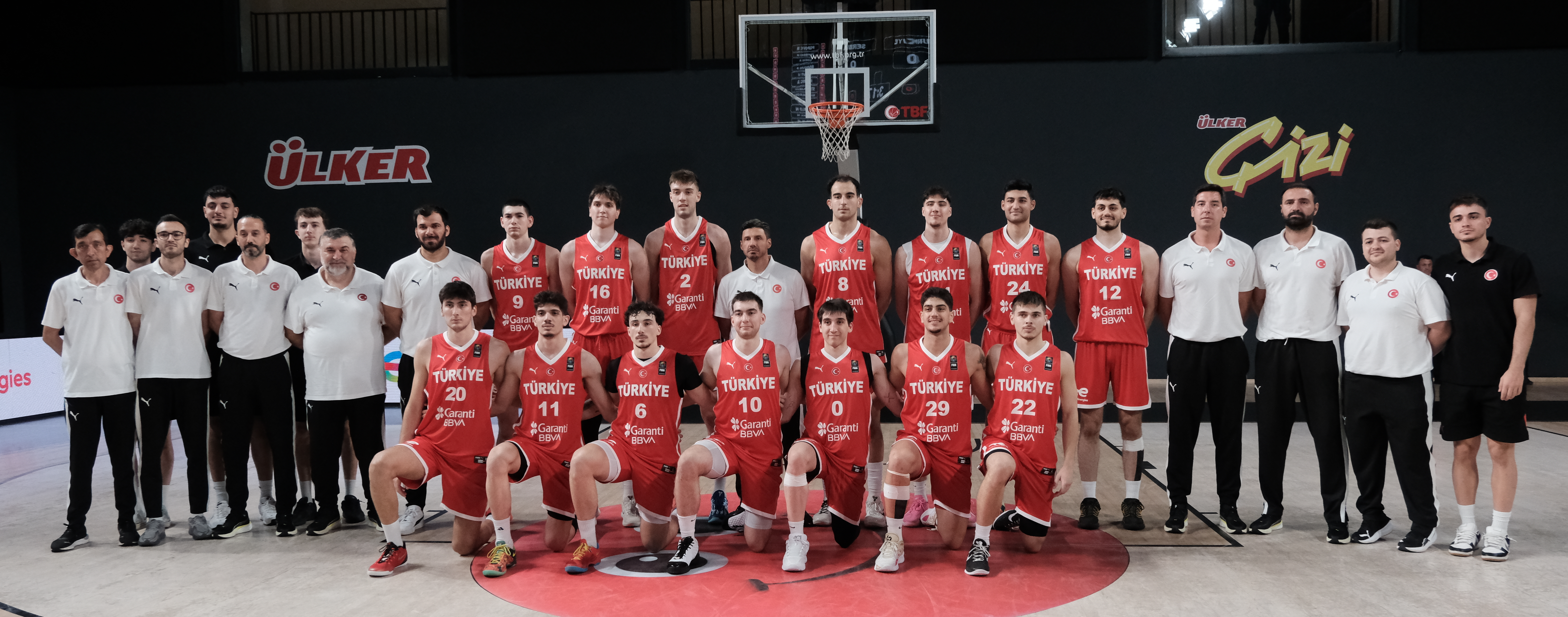
Türkiye national U20 basketball team in 2026

The Turkey men's national under-20 basketball team (Turkish: Ümit Milli Basketbol Takımı) is the national representative for Turkey in international men's under-20 basketball tournaments. They are formed and run by the Turkish Basketball Federation. The U20 team regularly competes at the FIBA U20 EuroBasket and in 2007, the U21 team participated at the FIBA Under-21 World Championship.

== FIBA U20 EuroBasket ==
| Year | Position |
|---|---|
| (Greece) 1992 | 10th |
| (Slovenia) 1994 | 6th |
| (Turkey) 1996 | 4th |
| (Italy) 1998 | 3rd place, bronze medalist(s) |
| (North Macedonia) 2000 | 6th |
| (Lithuania) 2002 | 9th |
| (Czech Republic) 2004 | Did not qualify |
| (Russia) 2005 | 12th |
| (Turkey) 2006 | 2nd place, silver medalist(s) |
| (Slovenia) 2007 | 7th |
| (Latvia) 2008 | 4th |
| (Greece) 2009 | 6th |
| (Croatia) 2010 | 13th |
| (Spain) 2011 | 6th |
| (Slovenia) 2012 | 9th |
| (Estonia) 2013 | 6th |
| (Greece) 2014 | 1st place, gold medalist(s) |
| (Italy) 2015 | 3rd place, bronze medalist(s) |
| (Finland) 2016 | 3rd place, bronze medalist(s) |
| (Greece) 2017 | 9th |
| (Germany) 2018 | 5th |
| (Israel) 2019 | 6th |
| (Montenegro) 2022 | 6th |
| (Greece) 2023 | 7th |
| (Poland) 2024 | 14th |
| (Armenia) 2025 | Division B, 3rd |
| (Slovenia) 2026 | 6th |
| Total | 25/27 (Div. A) 1/20 (Div. B) |

=== Squads ===
2014 FIBA Europe Under-20 Championship - Gold medal

Deniz Çevik, Doğukan Şanlı, Cedi Osman, Metin Türen, Metecan Birsen, Emircan Koşut, Efekan Coşar, Kartal Özmızrak, Berk Demir, Talat Altunbey, Muhsin Yaşar, Tayfun Erülkü - Head coach: Erhan Toker

2015 FIBA Europe Under-20 Championship - Bronze medal

Berk Uğurlu, Doğukan Şanlı, Doğuş Özdemiroğlu, Ege Arar, Metecan Birsen, Emircan Koşut, Tolga Geçim, Kartal Özmızrak, Berk Demir, Okben Ulubay, Muhsin Yaşar, Mert Celep - Head coach: Taner Günay

2016 FIBA Europe Under-20 Championship - Bronze medal

Berk Uğurlu, Doğuş Özdemiroğlu, Ege Arar, Egemen Güven, Kadir Bayram, Mert Çevik, Metehan Akyel, Oğulcan Baykan, Okben Ulubay, Ömer Yurtseven, Tolga Geçim, Yiğit Arslan - Head coach: Ömer Uğurata

== FIBA U21 World Championship ==
| Year | Position |
|---|---|
| (Spain) 1993 | Did not qualify |
| (Australia) 1997 | 6th |
| (Japan) 2001 | Did not qualify |
| (Argentina) 2005 | Did not qualify |
| Total | 1/4 |

== See also ==
- Turkey men's national basketball team
- Turkey men's national under-18 and under-19 basketball team
- Turkey women's national under-20 basketball team
