= Luca Illeș =

Romanian basketball player (born 2007)

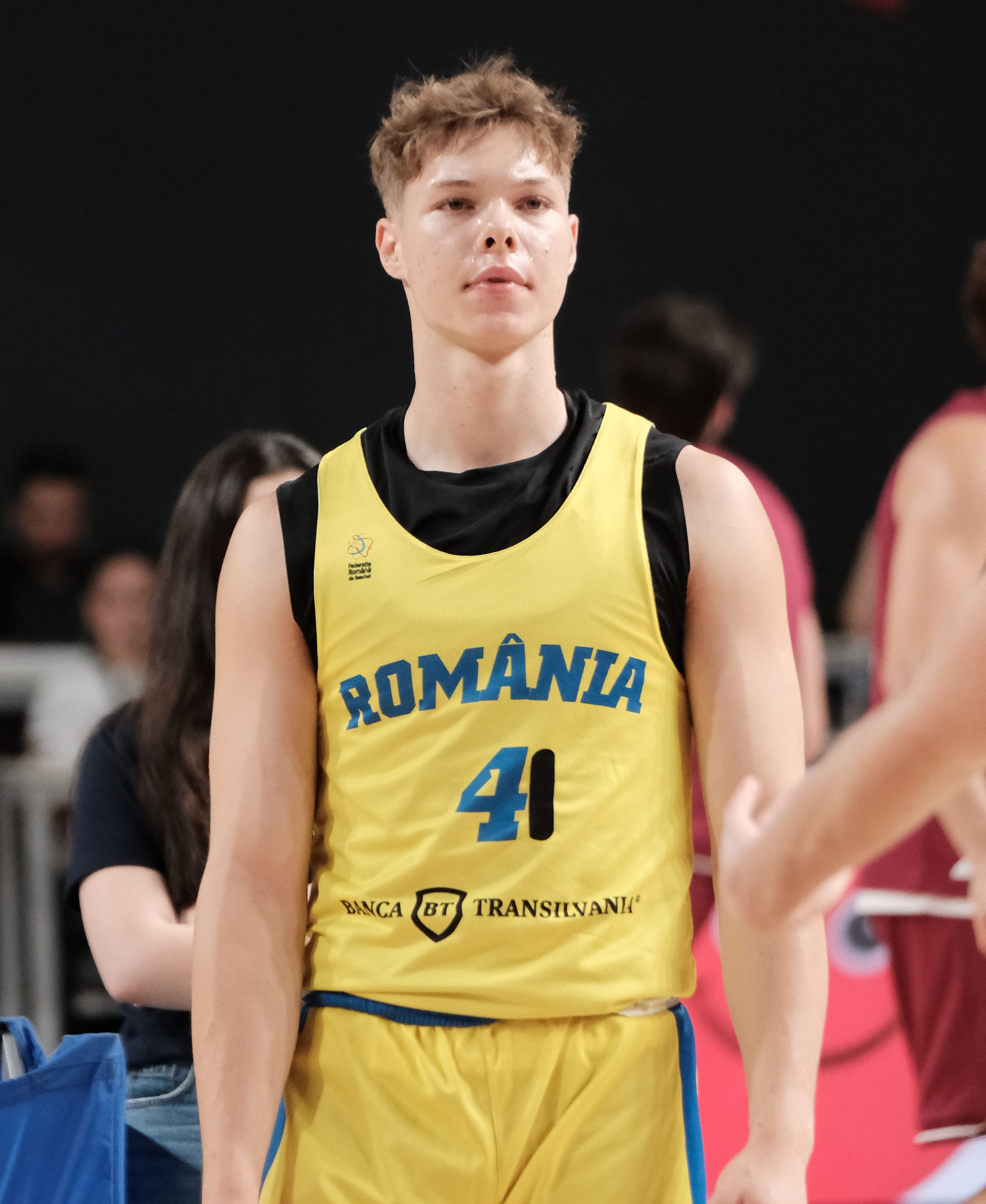
- Illeș with the Romania U20 national team

No. 88 – U-BT Cluj-Napoca
- Position: Point guard
- League: Liga Națională; ABA League; EuroCup

Personal information
- Born: January 8, 2007 (age 19) Timișoara, Romania
- Listed height: 197 cm (6 ft 6 in)
- Listed weight: 90 kg (198 lb)

Career information
- Playing career: 2025–present

Career history
- 2025–present: Partizan
- 2025–2026: →Metalac Valjevo
- 2026–present: →U-BT Cluj-Napoca

Luca-Ionuț Illeș (born January 8, 2007) is a Romanian professional basketball player for U-BT Cluj-Napoca of the Romanian Liga Națională, the ABA League, and the EuroCup, on loan from Partizan Belgrade.

== Early career ==
He played for youth selections of Partizan Mozzart Bet and Mega Basket since season 2022/23.

== Professional career ==
=== Partizan (2025–present) ===
On January 13, 2025, Illeș signed a multi-year contract with Partizan of the Serbian SuperLeague, the ABA League, and the EuroLeague.

==== Loan to U-BT Cluj-Napoca (2026–present) ====
On 16 August 2026, Illeș was loaned to U-BT Cluj-Napoca of the Romanian Liga Națională, the ABA League, and the EuroCup.
