= Spain men's national under-20 basketball team =

Spain
- FIBA ranking: 2nd (As of 13 Dec 2025)
- FIBA zone: FIBA Europe
- National federation: FEB

U21 World Championship
- Appearances: 3
- Medals: None

U20 EuroBasket
- Appearances: 27
- Medals: Gold: 3 (2011, 2016, 2022); Silver: 6 (1996, 2002, 2007, 2014, 2015, 2019); Bronze: 8 (1994, 2000, 2008, 2009, 2010, 2012, 2013, 2026)
Home	Away
Medal record
Event	1st	2nd	3rd
FIBA U21 World Championship	0	0	0
FIBA U20 EuroBasket	3	6	8
Total	3	6	8

The Spain men's national under-20 basketball team is the representative for Spain in international basketball competitions, and it is organized and run by the Spanish Basketball Federation. The U20 team represents Spain at the FIBA U20 EuroBasket. Between 1993 and 2001, the U21 team represented Spain at the former FIBA Under-21 World Championship.

== FIBA U20 EuroBasket record ==
Year	Pos.	Pld	W	L
(Greece) 1992	6th	7	2	5
(Slovenia) 1994	3rd place, bronze medalist(s)	7	5	2
(Turkey) 1996	2nd place, silver medalist(s)	7	5	2
(Italy) 1998	4th	8	3	5
(North Macedonia) 2000	3rd place, bronze medalist(s)	8	7	1
(Lithuania) 2002	2nd place, silver medalist(s)	8	5	3
(Czech Republic) 2004	11th	7	3	4
(Russia) 2005	9th	8	6	2
(Turkey) 2006	11th	8	4	4
(Slovenia) 2007	2nd place, silver medalist(s)	8	7	1
(Latvia) 2008	3rd place, bronze medalist(s)	8	5	3
(Greece) 2009	3rd place, bronze medalist(s)	9	7	2
(Croatia) 2010	3rd place, bronze medalist(s)	9	6	3
(Spain) 2011	1st place, gold medalist(s)	9	9	0
(Slovenia) 2012	3rd place, bronze medalist(s)	9	5	4
(Estonia) 2013	3rd place, bronze medalist(s)	10	6	4
(Greece) 2014	2nd place, silver medalist(s)	10	7	3
(Italy) 2015	2nd place, silver medalist(s)	10	7	3
(Finland) 2016	1st place, gold medalist(s)	7	6	1
(Greece) 2017	4th	7	5	2
(Germany) 2018	7th	7	3	4
(Israel) 2019	2nd place, silver medalist(s)	7	6	1
(Montenegro) 2022	1st place, gold medalist(s)	7	7	0
(Greece) 2023	10th	7	5	2
(Poland) 2024	7th	7	5	2
(Greece) 2025	8th	7	2	5
(Slovenia) 2026	3rd place, bronze medalist(s)	7	6	1
Total	27/27	213	144	69

== FIBA Under-21 World Championship record ==
Year	Pos.	Pld	W	L
(Spain) 1993	7th	8	3	5
(Australia) 1997	7th	8	4	4
(Japan) 2001	5th	8	6	2
(Argentina) 2005	Did not qualify			
Total	3/4	24	13	11

== See also ==
- Spanish Basketball Federation
- Spain national youth basketball teams
