= 2010 FIBA Europe Under-20 Championship =

International basketball competition

2010 FIBA U20 European Championship
13th FIBA Under-20 European Basketball Championship

Tournament details
- Host country: Croatia
- Dates: July 8–18
- Teams: 16 (from 49 federations)
- Venues: 3 (in 3 host cities)

Final positions
- Champions: France (1st title)

Tournament statistics
- MVP: (France) Andrew Albicy
- Top scorer: (Greece) Pappas (22.1)
- Top rebounds: (Turkey) Aldemir (11.6)
- Top assists: (France) Albicy (5.9)
- PPG (Team): Lithuania (77.0)
- RPG (Team): Russia (38.7)
- APG (Team): Lithuania (12.5)

Official website
- Official website (archive)

The 2010 FIBA Europe Under-20 Championship was the 13th edition of the FIBA Europe Under-20 Championship. The cities of Zadar, Crikvenica and Makarska, in Croatia, hosted the tournament. France won their first title.

Netherlands and the Czech Republic were relegated to Division B.

== Teams ==
- Croatia
- Czech Republic
- France
- Germany
- Greece
- Italy
- Latvia
- Lithuania
- Montenegro
- Netherlands
- Russia
- Serbia
- Slovenia
- Spain
- Turkey
- Ukraine

== Preliminary round ==
The sixteen teams were allocated in four groups of four teams each.

Team advanced to Qualifying round
Team competed in Classification round

=== Group A ===
Team	Pld	W	L	PF	PA	Pts
Greece	3	3	0	262	196	6
Ukraine	3	2	1	252	233	5
Latvia	3	1	2	207	226	4
Czech Republic	3	0	3	195	261	3

July 8, 2010
Ukraine	91–70	Latvia	Crikvenica
Czech Republic	67–92	Greece	Crikvenica
July 9, 2010
Latvia	84–53	Czech Republic	Crikvenica
Greece	88–76	Ukraine	Crikvenica
July 10, 2010
Ukraine	85–75	Czech Republic	Crikvenica
Greece	82–53	Latvia	Crikvenica

=== Group B ===
Team	Pld	W	L	PF	PA	Pts	Tie-breaker
Serbia	3	2	1	221	204	5	1–1 (+2)
Montenegro	3	2	1	194	192	5	1–1 (0)
Lithuania	3	2	1	226	212	5	1–1 (−2)
Turkey	3	0	3	197	230	3	

July 8, 2010
Montenegro	63–72	Lithuania	Crikvenica
Turkey	67–82	Serbia	Crikvenica
July 9, 2010
Serbia	59–68	Montenegro	Crikvenica
Lithuania	85–69	Turkey	Crikvenica
July 10, 2010
Turkey	61–63	Montenegro	Crikvenica
Lithuania	69–80	Serbia	Crikvenica

=== Group C ===
Team	Pld	W	L	PF	PA	Pts
France	3	3	0	187	171	6
Russia	3	2	1	211	199	5
Italy	3	1	2	203	199	4
Netherlands	3	0	3	190	222	3

July 8, 2010
Italy	68–73	Russia	Makarska
Netherlands	54–66	France	Makarska
July 9, 2010
Russia	79–71	Netherlands	Makarska
France	61–58	Italy	Makarska
July 10, 2010
Italy	77–65	Netherlands	Makarska
France	60–59	Russia	Makarska

=== Group D ===
Team	Pld	W	L	PF	PA	Pts
Spain	3	2	1	191	183	5
Croatia	3	2	1	197	183	5
Slovenia	3	1	2	201	192	4
Germany	3	1	2	171	202	4

July 8, 2010
Germany	63–61	Spain	Makarska
Slovenia	65–72	Croatia	Makarska
July 9, 2010
Spain	66–61	Slovenia	Makarska
Croatia	66–54	Germany	Makarska
July 10, 2010
Germany	54–75	Slovenia	Makarska
Croatia	59–64	Spain	Makarska

== Qualifying round ==
The twelve teams were allocated in two groups of six teams each. The results of the games between the teams from the same group in the preliminary round were taken into account for the ranking in this round.

Team advanced to Quarter-final
Team competed in the 9th–12th playoffs

=== Group E ===
Team	Pld	W	L	PF	PA	Pts	Tie-breaker
Greece	5	5	0	391	340	10	
Ukraine	5	3	2	386	397	8	
Serbia	5	2	3	335	323	7	1–1 (+2)
Montenegro	5	2	3	355	359	7	1–1 (0)
Lithuania	5	2	3	383	358	7	1–1 (−2)
Latvia	5	1	4	312	385	6	

July 12, 2010
Lithuania	70–75	Greece	Crikvenica
Montenegro	75–88	Ukraine	Crikvenica
Latvia	57–70	Serbia	Crikvenica
July 13, 2010
Greece	83–79	Montenegro	Crikvenica
Lithuania	72–75	Latvia	Crikvenica
Ukraine	66–64	Serbia	Crikvenica
July 14, 2010
Montenegro	70–57	Latvia	Crikvenica
Serbia	62–63	Greece	Crikvenica
Ukraine	65–100	Lithuania	Crikvenica

=== Group F ===
Team	Pld	W	L	PF	PA	Pts
Spain	5	4	1	345	312	9
Croatia	5	4	1	348	293	9
France	5	3	2	277	294	8
Russia	5	2	3	331	353	7
Italy	5	1	4	325	354	6
Slovenia	5	1	4	316	336	6

July 12, 2010
Italy	56–78	Spain	Makarska
Slovenia	43–50	France	Makarska
Croatia	75–61	Russia	Makarska
July 13, 2010
Slovenia	65–80	Italy	Makarska
Russia	70–68	Spain	Makarska
France	40–65	Croatia	Makarska
July 14, 2010
Russia	68–62	Slovenia	Makarska
Spain	69–66	France	Makarska
Croatia	77–63	Italy	Makarska

== Classification round ==
Team relegated to Division B

=== Group G ===
Team	Pld	W	L	PF	PA	Pts
Turkey	6	4	2	420	394	10
Germany	6	4	2	421	390	10
Netherlands	6	3	3	400	415	9
Czech Republic	6	1	5	396	438	7

July 12, 2010
Czech Republic	68–73	Germany	Zadar
Turkey	63–68	Netherlands	Zadar
July 13, 2010
Netherlands	67–75	Czech Republic	Zadar
Germany	65–75	Turkey	Zadar
July 14, 2010
Czech Republic	61–70	Turkey	Zadar
Netherlands	57–67	Germany	Zadar
July 16, 2010
Germany	75–69	Czech Republic	Zadar
Netherlands	70–66	Turkey	Zadar
July 17, 2010
Turkey	74–68	Germany	Zadar
Czech Republic	71–81	Netherlands	Zadar
July 18, 2010
Turkey	72–62	Czech Republic	Zadar
Germany	73–57	Netherlands	Zadar

== Knockout stage ==
=== 9th–12th playoffs ===
Playoffs
July 16, Zadar
Lithuania	74
Slovenia	72
July 16, Zadar
Italy	78
Latvia	73

Ninth place
July 17, Zadar
Lithuania	74
Italy	73
Eleventh place
July 17, Zadar
Slovenia	73
Latvia	76

=== Championship bracket ===
Quarter-finals
July 16, Zadar
Greece	74
Russia	55
July 16, Zadar
Serbia	75
Croatia	76
July 16, Zadar
Ukraine	57
France	80
July 16, Zadar
Spain	64
Montenegro	50

Semi-finals
July 17, Zadar
Greece	71
Croatia	56
July 17, Zadar
France	86
Spain	83

Final
July 18, Zadar
Greece	62
France	73
Third place
July 18, Zadar
Croatia	79
Spain	86

=== 5th–8th playoffs ===
Playoffs
July 17, Zadar
Russia	92
Serbia	80
July 17, Zadar
Ukraine	61
Montenegro	84

Fifth place
July 18, Zadar
Russia	70
Montenegro	60
Seventh place
July 18, Zadar
Serbia	107
Ukraine	93

2010 FIBA Europe U-20 Championship

France
First title

== Final standings ==
Rank	Team
Gold medal	France
Silver medal	Greece
Bronze medal	Spain
4th	Croatia
5th	Russia
6th	Montenegro
7th	Serbia
8th	Ukraine
9th	Lithuania
10th	Italy
11th	Latvia
12th	Slovenia
13th	Turkey
14th	Germany
15th	Netherlands
16th	Czech Republic

== Stats leaders ==
=== Points ===
Rank	Name	Points	Games	PPG
1.	(Greece) Nikos Pappas	199	9	22.1
2.	(Ukraine) Ruslan Otverchenko	169	9	18.8
3.	(Italy) Alessandro Gentile	138	8	17.3
3.	(Ukraine) Kyryl Natyazhko	155	9	17.2
5.	(Montenegro) Vladimir Mihailović	152	9	16.9

=== Rebounds ===
Rank	Name	Points	Games	RPG
1.	(Turkey) Furkan Aldemir	104	9	11.6
2.	(Russia) Vladimir Ivlev	103	9	11.4
3.	(Ukraine) Kyryl Natyazhko	76	9	8.4
4.	(Serbia) Dejan Musli	67	8	8.4
5.	(Montenegro) Bojan Dubljević	70	9	7.8

=== Assists ===
Rank	Name	Points	Games	RPG
1.	(France) Andrew Albicy	53	9	5.9
2.	(Czech Republic) Tomáš Satoranský	49	9	5.4
3.	(Turkey) Ibrahim Yildirim	35	9	3.9
4.	(Spain) Josep Franch	33	9	3.7
5.	(Serbia) Nemanja Nedović	32	9	3.6

== All-Tournament Team ==
- (France) Andrew Albicy (MVP)
- (Greece) Nikos Pappas
- (Greece) Kostas Papanikolaou
- (Croatia) Mario Delaš
- (Spain) Nikola Mirotić
