= 2002 FIBA Europe Under-20 Championship =

International basketball competition

2002 FIBA U20 European Championship
6th FIBA Under-20 European Basketball Championship

Tournament details
- Host country: Lithuania
- Dates: July 26 – August 4, 2002
- Teams: 12 (from 1 federation)
- Venues: 3 (in 3 host cities)

Final positions
- Champions: Greece (1st title)

Tournament statistics
- MVP: (Greece) Nikos Zisis
- Top scorer: (Croatia) Popović (25.0)
- Top rebounds: (Federal Republic of Yugoslavia) Krstić (11.3)
- Top assists: (Croatia) Popović (7.1)
- PPG (Team): Croatia (88.8)
- RPG (Team): Lithuania (43.5)
- APG (Team): Greece (16.8)

Official website
- Official website (archive)

The 2002 FIBA Europe Under-20 Championship (known at that time as 2002 European Championship for Young Men) was the sixth edition of the FIBA Europe Under-20 Championship. The cities of Kaunas, Alytus and Vilnius, in Lithuania, hosted the tournament. Greece won their first title.

== Teams ==
- Croatia
- France
- Greece
- Israel
- Italy
- Lithuania
- Russia
- Slovenia
- Spain
- Turkey
- Ukraine
- Yugoslavia

== Preliminary round ==
The twelve teams were allocated in two groups of six teams each.

Team advanced to Quarterfinals
Team competed in 9th–12th playoffs

=== Group A ===
Team	Pld	W	L	PF	PA	Pts
Slovenia	5	4	1	404	408	9
Yugoslavia	5	4	1	426	383	9
Greece	5	3	2	469	412	8
Lithuania	5	2	3	389	399	7
Italy	5	2	3	415	429	7
Turkey	5	0	5	381	453	5

26 July 2002
Turkey	89–91	Slovenia	Kaunas
Lithuania	68–79	Yugoslavia	Kaunas
Italy	82–81	Greece	Kaunas
27 July 2002
Yugoslavia	90–87	Turkey	Kaunas
Greece	104–93	Lithuania	Kaunas
Slovenia	100–84	Italy	Kaunas
28 July 2002
Greece	89–93	Yugoslavia	Kaunas
Lithuania	64–67	Slovenia	Kaunas
Italy	100–68	Turkey	Kaunas
30 July 2002
Slovenia	71–100	Greece	Kaunas
Turkey	64–77	Lithuania	Kaunas
Yugoslavia	93–64	Italy	Kaunas
31 July 2002
Greece	95–73	Turkey	Kaunas
Lithuania	87–85	Italy	Kaunas
Slovenia	75–71	Yugoslavia	Kaunas

=== Group B ===
Team	Pld	W	L	PF	PA	Pts
Russia	5	4	1	429	380	9
Croatia	5	4	1	454	427	9
Spain	5	3	2	377	349	8
France	5	3	2	389	398	8
Ukraine	5	1	4	377	404	6
Israel	5	0	5	331	399	5

26 July 2002
Israel	64–76	Ukraine	Alytus
Russia	100–93	Croatia	Alytus
Spain	89–53	France	Alytus
27 July 2002
Croatia	95–76	Israel	Alytus
France	88–75	Russia	Alytus
Ukraine	71–75	Spain	Alytus
28 July 2002
France	84–91	Croatia	Alytus
Russia	89–69	Ukraine	Alytus
Spain	64–61	Israel	Alytus
30 July 2002
Ukraine	72–84	France	Alytus
Israel	59–84	Russia	Alytus
Croatia	83–78	Spain	Alytus
31 July 2002
France	80–71	Israel	Alytus
Russia	81–71	Spain	Alytus
Ukraine	89–92	Croatia	Alytus

== Knockout stage ==
=== 9th–12th playoffs ===
Playoffs
August 2, Vilnius
Italy	67
Israel	75
August 2, Vilnius
Turkey	101
Ukraine	98

Ninth place
August 3, Vilnius
Israel	73
Turkey	79
Eleventh place
August 3, Vilnius
Italy	90
Ukraine	77

=== Championship ===
Quarterfinals
August 2, Vilnius
Croatia	80
Greece	81
August 2, Vilnius
France	84
Slovenia	73
August 2, Vilnius
Yugoslavia	71
Spain	72
August 2, Vilnius
Russia	83
Lithuania	75

Semifinals
August 3, Vilnius
Greece	79
France	70
August 3, Vilnius
Spain	86
Russia	81

Final
August 4, Vilnius
Greece	77
Spain	73
Third place
August 4, Vilnius
France	95
Russia	78

==== 5th–8th playoffs ====
Playoffs
August 3, Vilnius
Croatia	88
Slovenia	90
August 3, Vilnius
Yugoslavia	71
Lithuania	72

Fifth place
August 4, Vilnius
Slovenia	74
Lithuania	78
Seventh place
August 4, Vilnius
Croatia	89
Yugoslavia	105

2002 FIBA Europe U-20 Championship

Greece
First title

== Final standings ==
Rank	Team
Gold medal	Greece
Silver medal	Spain
Bronze medal	France
4th	Russia
5th	Lithuania
6th	Slovenia
7th	Yugoslavia
8th	Croatia
9th	Turkey
10th	Israel
11th	Italy
12th	Ukraine
