= 1996 FIBA Europe Under-20 Championship =

International basketball competition

1996 FIBA U20 European Championship
3rd FIBA Under-20 European Basketball Championship

Tournament details
- Host country: Turkey
- Dates: 30 June – 7 July 1996
- Teams: 12 (from 1 federation)
- Venues: 2 (in 2 host cities)

Final positions
- Champions: Lithuania (1st title)

Tournament statistics
- MVP: (Slovenia) Radoslav Nesterović
- Top scorer: (Turkey) Kutluay (22.3)
- Top rebounds: (Slovenia) Nesterović (9.6)
- Top assists: (Russia) Kuzmin (6.0)
- PPG (Team): Lithuania (84.6)
- RPG (Team): Russia (31.6)
- APG (Team): Lithuania (14.4)

The 1996 FIBA Europe Under-20 Championship (known at that time as 1996 European Championship for Men 22 and Under') was the third edition of the FIBA Europe Under-20 Championship. The cities of Bursa and Istanbul, in Turkey, hosted the tournament. Lithuania won their first title.

== Qualification ==
- Belarus
- Belgium
- France
- Greece
- Israel
- Italy
- Lithuania
- Russia
- Slovenia
- Spain
- Turkey
- Yugoslavia

== Preliminary round ==
The twelve teams were allocated in two groups of six teams each.

=== Group A ===
Team	Pld	W	L	PF	PA	PD	Pts	Qualification
Lithuania	5	4	1	423	361	+62	9 (Note: LIT 90–79 ESP)	Advanced to Semifinals
Spain	5	4	1	396	351	+45	9	Advanced to Semifinals
Slovenia	5	3	2	349	335	+14	8	Competed in 5th–8th playoffs
Greece	5	2	3	376	372	+4	7 (Note: ISR 76–101 GRE)	Competed in 5th–8th playoffs
Israel	5	2	3	358	413	−55	7	Competed in 9th–12th playoffs
Belarus	5	0	5	329	399	−70	5	Competed in 9th–12th playoffs

Notes:

30 June 1996
Belarus	65–85	Slovenia	Bursa
Lithuania	90–79	Spain	Bursa
Israel	76–101	Greece	Bursa
1 July 1996
Slovenia	71–70	Lithuania	Bursa
Greece	77–57	Belarus	Bursa
Spain	80–67	Israel	Bursa
2 July 1996
Greece	57–67	Slovenia	Bursa
Israel	70–93	Lithuania	Bursa
Belarus	61–81	Spain	Bursa
3 July 1996
Slovenia	64–69	Israel	Bursa
Spain	82–71	Greece	Bursa
Lithuania	80–71	Belarus	Bursa
4 July 1996
Spain	74–62	Slovenia	Bursa
Belarus	75–76	Israel	Bursa
Greece	70–90	Lithuania	Bursa

=== Group B ===
Team	Pld	W	L	PF	PA	PD	Pts	Qualification
Yugoslavia	5	4	1	369	338	+31	9	Advanced to Semifinals
Turkey	5	3	2	346	297	+49	8 (Note: RUS 51–76 TUR)	Advanced to Semifinals
Russia	5	3	2	376	362	+14	8	Competed in 5th–8th playoffs
Italy	5	2	3	350	376	−26	7 (Note: FRA 64–74 ITA)	Competed in 5th–8th playoffs
France	5	2	3	347	359	−12	7	Competed in 9th–12th playoffs
Belgium	5	1	4	352	408	−56	6	Competed in 9th–12th playoffs

Notes:

30 June 1996
Russia	81–73	Belgium	Istanbul
France	64–74	Italy	Istanbul
Turkey	49–50	Yugoslavia	Istanbul
1 July 1996
Belgium	59–81	France	Istanbul
Yugoslavia	86–66	Russia	Istanbul
Italy	76–87	Turkey	Istanbul
2 July 1996
Yugoslavia	96–82	Belgium	Istanbul
Russia	93–56	Italy	Istanbul
Turkey	58–60	France	Istanbul
3 July 1996
Italy	70–54	Yugoslavia	Istanbul
France	71–85	Russia	Istanbul
Belgium	60–76	Turkey	Istanbul
4 July 1996
Yugoslavia	83–71	France	Istanbul
Italy	74–78	Belgium	Istanbul
Russia	51–76	Turkey	Istanbul

== Knockout stage ==
=== 9th–12th playoffs ===
Playoffs
6 July
France	71
Belarus	104
6 July
Israel	95
Belgium	80

Ninth place
7 July
Belarus	84
Israel	92
Eleventh place
7 July
France	103
Belgium	75

=== 5th–8th playoffs ===
Playoffs
6 July
Greece	81
Russia	80
6 July
Italy	71
Slovenia	69

Fifth place
7 July
Greece	80
Italy	86
Seventh place
7 July
Russia	79
Slovenia	83

=== Championship ===
Semifinals
6 July
Spain	69
Yugoslavia	66
6 July
Turkey	74
Lithuania	84

Final
7 July
Spain	81
Lithuania	85
Third Place
7 July
Yugoslavia	67
Turkey	62

1996 FIBA Europe U-20 Championship

Lithuania
First title

Winning roster:

- Tomas Masiulis (PF)
- Evaldas Jocys (F/C)
- Nerijus Karlikanovas (F)
- Mindaugas Timinskas (G/F)
- Kęstutis Šeštokas (F)
- Ramūnas Petraitis (PG)
- Kęstutis Marčiulionis (PG)
- Dainius Adomaitis (G/F)
- Giedrius Aidietis (C)
- Šarūnas Jasikevičius (PG)
- Andrius Jurkūnas (PF)
- Virginijus Praškevičius (F/C)

== Final standings ==
Rank	Team
Gold medal	Lithuania
Silver medal	Spain
Bronze medal	Yugoslavia
4th	Turkey
5th	Italy
6th	Greece
7th	Slovenia
8th	Russia
9th	Israel
10th	Belarus
11th	France
12th	Belgium
