= France men's national under-20 basketball team =

Youth basketball team representing France

France
- FIBA zone: FIBA Europe
- National federation: French Federation of Basketball

U21 World Championship
- Appearances: 1
- Medals: Silver: 1 (1993)

U20 EuroBasket
- Appearances: 26
- Medals: Gold: 3 (2010, 2023, 2024); Silver: 2 (2009, 2012); Bronze: 5 (1992, 2002, 2011, 2017, 2025)

The France men's national under-20 basketball team is a national basketball team of France, administered by the French Federation of Basketball. It represents the country in under-20 men's international basketball competitions.

== FIBA U20 EuroBasket participations ==
Year	Result in Division A
1992	3rd place, bronze medalist(s)
1994	11th
1996	11th
1998	5th
2000	8th
2002	3rd place, bronze medalist(s)
2005	6th
2006	6th
2007	9th
2008	7th
2009	2nd place, silver medalist(s)
2010	1st place, gold medalist(s)
2011	3rd place, bronze medalist(s)

Year	Result in Division A
2012	2nd place, silver medalist(s)
2013	9th
2014	8th
2015	4th
2016	13th
2017	3rd place, bronze medalist(s)
2018	4th
2019	4th
2022	5th
2023	1st place, gold medalist(s)
2024	1st place, gold medalist(s)
2025	3rd place, bronze medalist(s)
2026	4th

== FIBA Under-21 World Championship participations ==
Year	Result
1993	2nd place, silver medalist(s)

== See also ==
- France men's national basketball team
- France men's national under-19 basketball team
- France women's national under-20 basketball team
