= 1998 FIBA Europe Under-20 Championship =

International basketball competition

1998 FIBA U20 European Championship
4th FIBA Under-20 European Basketball Championship

Tournament details
- Host country: Italy
- Dates: 14–23 July 1998
- Teams: 12 (from 1 federation)
- Venue: (in 1 host city)

Final positions
- Champions: Yugoslavia (1st title)

Tournament statistics
- MVP: (Federal Republic of Yugoslavia) Igor Rakočević
- Top scorer: (Federal Republic of Yugoslavia) Rakočević (21.1)
- Top rebounds: (Italy) Podestà (9.6)
- Top assists: (Lithuania) Marčiulionis (2.3)
- PPG (Team): Yugoslavia (76.4)
- RPG (Team): Lithuania (34.0)
- APG (Team): Yugoslavia (4.8)

The 1998 FIBA Europe Under-20 Championship (known at that time as 1998 European Championship for Men '22 and Under') was the fourth edition of the FIBA Europe Under-20 Championship. The city of Trapani, in Italy, hosted the tournament. Yugoslavia won their first title.

== Teams ==
- Croatia
- Germany
- France
- Greece
- Israel
- Italy
- Latvia
- Lithuania
- Slovenia
- Spain
- Turkey
- Yugoslavia

== Preliminary round ==
The twelve teams were allocated in two groups of six teams each.

Team advanced to Quarterfinals
Team competed in 9th–12th playoffs

=== Group A ===
Team	Pld	W	L	PF	PA	Pts
Germany	5	4	1	347	293	9
Yugoslavia	5	4	1	380	323	9
France	5	2	3	329	319	7
Italy	5	2	3	318	346	7
Croatia	5	2	3	341	409	7
Greece	5	1	4	333	358	6

14 July 1998
Yugoslavia	83–72	Greece	Trapani
France	74–57	Croatia	Trapani
Germany	55–56	Italy	Trapani
15 July 1998
Croatia	64–85	Yugoslavia	Trapani
Greece	64–69	Germany	Trapani
Italy	53–49	France	Trapani
16 July 1998
Germany	98–62	Croatia	Trapani
Yugoslavia	77–69	France	Trapani
Greece	71–58	Italy	Trapani
18 July 1998
France	56–68	Germany	Trapani
Croatia	67–62	Greece	Trapani
Italy	61–80	Yugoslavia	Trapani
19 July 1998
Greece	64–81	France	Trapani
Germany	57–55	Yugoslavia	Trapani
Croatia	91–90	Italy	Trapani

=== Group B ===
Team	Pld	W	L	PF	PA	Pts
Turkey	5	5	0	350	314	10
Slovenia	5	4	1	377	340	9
Lithuania	5	3	2	344	352	8
Spain	5	2	3	383	362	7
Israel	5	1	4	333	364	6
Latvia	5	0	5	343	398	5

14 July 1998
Israel	63–74	Slovenia	Trapani
Lithuania	56–59	Turkey	Trapani
Latvia	72–102	Spain	Trapani
15 July 1998
Slovenia	77–59	Lithuania	Trapani
Spain	67–53	Israel	Trapani
Turkey	63–59	Latvia	Trapani
16 July 1998
Lithuania	76–72	Israel	Trapani
Latvia	73–80	Slovenia	Trapani
Turkey	76–69	Spain	Trapani
18 July 1998
Spain	71–79	Lithuania	Trapani
Israel	79–66	Latvia	Trapani
Slovenia	64–71	Turkey	Trapani
19 July 1998
Latvia	73–74	Lithuania	Trapani
Turkey	81–66	Israel	Trapani
Slovenia	82–74	Spain	Trapani

== Knockout stage ==
=== 9th–12th playoffs ===
Playoffs
22 July
Latvia	75
Croatia	78
22 July
Israel	81
Greece	80

Ninth place
23 July
Croatia	80
Israel	64
Eleventh place
23 July
Latvia	85
Greece	101

=== Championship ===
Quarterfinals
21 July
Germany	69
Spain	71
21 July
Slovenia	77
France	64
21 July
Lithuania	67
Yugoslavia	73
21 July
Turkey	58
Italy	48

Semifinals
22 July
Spain	66
Slovenia	74
22 July
Yugoslavia	66
Turkey	55

Final
23 July
Slovenia	73
Yugoslavia	92
Third place
23 July
Spain	57
Turkey	64

==== 5th–8th playoffs ====
Playoffs
22 July
Germany	78
France	84
22 July
Lithuania	56
Italy	70

Fifth place
23 July
France	55
Italy	39
Seventh place
23 July
Germany	97
Lithuania	95

== Final standings ==
Rank	Team
Gold medal	Yugoslavia
Silver medal	Slovenia
Bronze medal	Turkey
4th	Spain
5th	France
6th	Italy
7th	Germany
8th	Lithuania
9th	Croatia
10th	Israel
11th	Greece
12th	Latvia

1998 European Championship for Men '20 and Under'

Yugoslavia
First title

Team roster

Milan Dozet, Veselin Petrović, Igor Rakočević, Aleksandar Glintić, Stevan Nađfeji, Jovo Stanojević, Marko Jarić, Dragan Ćeranić, Dejan Milojević, Ratko Varda, and Bojan Obradović. Head coach: Goran Bojanić.
