= 2000 FIBA Europe Under-20 Championship =

International basketball competition

2000 FIBA U20 European Championship
5th FIBA Under-20 European Basketball Championship

Tournament details
- Host country: Republic of Macedonia
- Dates: 28 July – 6 August 2000
- Teams: 12 (from 1 federation)
- Venue: 1 (in 1 host city)

Final positions
- Champions: Slovenia (1st title)
- Runners-up: Israel
- Third place: Spain

Tournament statistics
- MVP: (Slovenia) Sani Bečirović
- Top scorer: (North Macedonia) Ilievski (23.0)
- Top rebounds: (Croatia) Žižić (10.3)
- Top assists: (Slovenia) Bečirović (3.3)
- PPG (Team): Lithuania (76.9)
- RPG (Team): Lithuania (32.0)
- APG (Team): Yugoslavia (12.6)

Official website
- Archive website

The 2000 FIBA Europe Under-20 Championship (known at that time as 2000 European Championship for Young Men) was the fifth edition of the FIBA Europe Under-20 Championship. The Biljanini Izvori Sports Hall in Ohrid, Republic of Macedonia, hosted the tournament from 28 July to 6 August 2000. Slovenia won their first title.

== Teams ==
- Croatia
- Czech Republic
- France
- Greece
- Israel
- Lithuania
- Macedonia
- Russia
- Slovenia
- Spain
- Turkey
- Yugoslavia

== Preliminary round ==
The twelve teams were allocated in two groups of six teams each.

Team advanced to Quarterfinals
Team was dropped to 9th–12th place playoffs

=== Group A ===
Team	Pld	W	L	PF	PA	Pts
Yugoslavia	5	4	1	371	335	9
Israel	5	3	2	355	330	8
Greece	5	3	2	397	363	8
Turkey	5	2	3	384	396	7
Lithuania	5	2	3	388	411	7
Macedonia	5	1	4	324	384	6

28 July 2000
Greece	77–80	Israel	Ohrid
Lithuania	89–79	Yugoslavia	Ohrid
Turkey	71–77	Macedonia	Ohrid
29 July 2000
Israel	73–56	Lithuania	Ohrid
Yugoslavia	73–57	Turkey	Ohrid
Macedonia	43–75	Greece	Ohrid
30 July 2000
Turkey	90–78	Lithuania	Ohrid
Macedonia	57–68	Israel	Ohrid
Greece	60–66	Yugoslavia	Ohrid
1 August 2000
Israel	70–72	Turkey	Ohrid
Lithuania	80–87	Greece	Ohrid
Yugoslavia	85–65	Macedonia	Ohrid
2 August 2000
Greece	98–94	Turkey	Ohrid
Yugoslavia	68–64	Israel	Ohrid
Macedonia	82–85	Lithuania	Ohrid

=== Group B ===
Team	Pld	W	L	PF	PA	Pts
Spain	5	5	0	369	299	10
Slovenia	5	3	2	361	357	8
France	5	2	3	333	339	7
Croatia	5	2	3	354	360	7
Russia	5	2	3	352	369	7
Czech Republic	5	1	4	346	391	6

28 July 2000
Czech Republic	75–73	Croatia	Ohrid
Russia	73–74	Slovenia	Ohrid
Spain	68–50	France	Ohrid
29 July 2000
Slovenia	84–80	Czech Republic	Ohrid
Croatia	65–70	Spain	Ohrid
France	70–77	Russia	Ohrid
30 July 2000
Spain	71–68	Slovenia	Ohrid
Croatia	68–89	France	Ohrid
Czech Republic	76–84	Russia	Ohrid
1 August 2000
Russia	63–76	Spain	Ohrid
Slovenia	71–75	Croatia	Ohrid
France	66–62	Czech Republic	Ohrid
2 August 2000
Croatia	73–55	Russia	Ohrid
Spain	84–53	Czech Republic	Ohrid
Slovenia	64–58	France	Ohrid

== Knockout stage ==
=== 9th–12th place playoffs ===
Playoffs
August 4
Czech Republic	71
Lithuania	88
August 4
Russia	75
Macedonia	67

Ninth place
August 5
Lithuania	62
Russia	70
Eleventh place
August 5
Czech Republic	72
Macedonia	83

=== Championship ===
Quarterfinals
August 4
Greece	71
Slovenia	84
August 4
Croatia	69
Yugoslavia	66
August 4
France	55
Israel	72
August 4
Spain	69
Turkey	56

Semifinals
August 5
Slovenia	74
Croatia	73
August 5
Israel	69
Spain	65

Final
August 6
Slovenia	66
Israel	65
Third place
August 6
Croatia	77
Spain	82

==== 5th–8th place playoffs ====
Playoffs
August 5
Greece	73
Yugoslavia	76
August 5
France	51
Turkey	61

Fifth place
August 6
Yugoslavia	78
Turkey	58
Seventh place
August 6
Greece	61
France	48

2000 FIBA Europe U-20 Championship

Slovenia
First title

== Final standings ==
Rank	Team
1st place, gold medalist(s)	Slovenia
2nd place, silver medalist(s)	Israel
3rd place, bronze medalist(s)	Spain
4th	Croatia
5th	Yugoslavia
6th	Turkey
7th	Greece
8th	France
9th	Russia
10th	Lithuania
11th	Macedonia
12th	Czech Republic
