= 2024 FIBA U18 EuroBasket =

International basketball competition

Koripallon alle 18-vuotiaiden Euroopan-mestaruuskilpailut 2024 Europamästerskapet i basket för U18 herrar 2024

Tournament details
- Host country: Finland
- City: Tampere
- Dates: 27 July – 4 August 2024
- Teams: 16 (from 1 confederation)
- Venues: 2 (in 1 host city)

Final positions
- Champions: Germany (1st title)
- Runners-up: Serbia
- Third place: Slovenia
- Fourth place: Israel

Tournament statistics
- MVP: (Israel) Ben Saraf
- Top scorer: (Israel) Ben Saraf (28.1 ppg)
- Top rebounds: (Germany) Hannes Steinbach (12.7 rpg)
- Top assists: (France) Nolan Traore (9.3 apg)

Official website
- www.fiba.basketball

The 2024 FIBA U18 EuroBasket was the 39th edition of the European basketball championship for men's under-18 national teams. The tournament was played in Tampere, Finland, from 27 July to 4 August 2024.

This was also the FIBA Europe's qualifying tournament for the 2025 FIBA Under-19 Basketball World Cup in Switzerland. Top five teams joined the automatically qualified hosts Switzerland.

== Participating teams ==
- Belgium ▲ (Runners-up, 2023 FIBA U18 European Championship Division B)
- Croatia
- Denmark
- Finland
- France
- Germany
- Greece
- Israel
- Italy
- Latvia ▲ (Winners, 2023 FIBA U18 European Championship Division B)
- Lithuania
- Serbia
- Slovenia
- Spain
- Sweden
- Turkey

== First round ==
The draw of the first round was held on 6 February 2024 in Freising, Germany.

In the first round, the teams were drawn into four groups of four. All teams advance to the playoffs.

All times are local (Eastern European Summer Time – UTC+3).

=== Group A ===
Pos	Team	Pld	W	L	PF	PA	PD	Pts
1	Germany	3	3	0	256	197	+59	6
2	Belgium	3	2	1	218	220	−2	5
3	Croatia	3	1	2	228	265	−37	4
4	Turkey	3	0	3	225	245	−20	3

Source: FIBA

27 July 2024
16:00

Boxscore

Belgium	87–71	Croatia
Scoring by quarter: 17–13, 29–17, 19–18, 22–23
Pts: Hodge 20; Rebs: Efono 9 Asts: Tallir, Efono 5		Pts: Juric 19; Rebs: Juric 9 Asts: Dolic, Torbarina 5

Hakametsä 1
Attendance: 306
Referees: Ofer Manheim (ISR), Joona Haaja (FIN), Javier Torres Sanchez (ESP)

27 July 2024
21:00

Boxscore

Germany	81–73	Turkey
Scoring by quarter: 26–24, 19–15, 17–10, 19–24
Pts: Kayil 17; Rebs: Duru 6 Asts: Anderson 7		Pts: Onat 21; Rebs: Altuntas 10; Asts: Aksu 4

Hakametsä 1
Attendance: 233
Referees: Andris Aunkrogers (LAT), Domen Krajnc (SLO), Petar Pesic (SRB)

28 July 2024
15:30

Boxscore

Turkey	73–77	Belgium
Scoring by quarter: 14–21, 17–24, 27–19, 15–13
Pts: Onat 19; Rebs: Altuntas 9 Asts: Ustun 5		Pts: Elouna Eyenga 15; Rebs: Three players 8 Asts: Tallir, Efono 6

Hakametsä 2
Attendance: 185
Referees: Gvidas Gedvilas (LTU), Joona Haaja (FIN), Elvis Binders-Coders (LAT)

28 July 2024
18:00

Boxscore

Croatia	70–99	Germany
Scoring by quarter: 15–18, 22–26, 15–21, 18–34
Pts: Pavkovic 14; Rebs: Grbic, Pavkovic 5 Asts: Four players 3		Pts: Kayil, Anderson 20; Rebs: Steinbach 19; Asts: Anderson 5

Hakametsä 2
Attendance: 52
Referees: Gintaras Maciulis (LTU), Alessandro Perciavalle (ITA), Elias Anttonen (FIN)

29 July 2024
13:00

Boxscore

Turkey	79–87	Croatia
Scoring by quarter: 22–17, 18–28, 21–23, 18–19
Pts: Kaba 19; Rebs: Yaman 6 Asts: Onat 4		Pts: Torbarina 19; Rebs: Juric 9 Asts: Three players 3

Hakametsä 2
Attendance: 143
Referees: Andris Aunkrogers (LAT), Valerio Grigioni (ITA), Gintaras Maciulis (LTU)

29 July 2024
13:30

Boxscore

Belgium	54–76	Germany
Scoring by quarter: 6–26, 12–22, 19–17, 17–11
Pts: Hodge 15; Rebs: Elouna Eyenga 7 Asts: Efono 3		Pts: Steinbach 15; Rebs: Steinbach 15; Asts: Anderson 6

Hakametsä 1
Attendance: 180
Referees: Javier Torres Sanchez (ESP), Hrvoje Cavar (BIH), Petar Pesic (SRB)

=== Group B ===
Pos	Team	Pld	W	L	PF	PA	PD	Pts
1	France	3	3	0	266	203	+63	6
2	Sweden	3	2	1	257	260	−3	5
3	Greece	3	1	2	242	247	−5	4
4	Denmark	3	0	3	257	312	−55	3

Source: FIBA

27 July 2024
13:00

Boxscore

Greece	66–69	France
Scoring by quarter: 20–16, 14–25, 16–17, 16–11
Pts: Liotopoulos 16; Rebs: Abosi, Pagonis 6 Asts: Liotopoulos 7		Pts: Beringer 14; Rebs: Traore 9 Asts: Traore 12

Hakametsä 2
Attendance: 205
Referees: Gvidas Gedvilas (LTU), Valerio Grigioni (ITA), Elvis Binders-Coders (LAT)

27 July 2024
20:30

Boxscore

Denmark	91–108	Sweden
Scoring by quarter: 24–30, 20–26, 23–30, 24–22
Pts: Moller 16; Rebs: Moller 5 Asts: Erichsen 9		Pts: Price 30; Rebs: Obenjo 8 Asts: Price 7

Hakametsä 2
Attendance: 128
Referees: Alessandro Perciavalle (ITA), Elias Anttonen (FIN), Gintaras Maciulis (LTU)

28 July 2024
16:00

Boxscore

Sweden	91–81 (OT)	Greece
Scoring by quarter: 16–26, 18–15, 32–18, 13–20, Overtime: 12–2
Pts: Pohto 24; Rebs: Obenjo 15; Asts: Nzonyansi 9		Pts: Pagonis 24; Rebs: Pagonis 11; Asts: Liotopoulos 7

Hakametsä 1
Attendance: 509
Referees: Ofer Manheim (ISR), Javier Torres Sanchez (ESP), Valerio Grigioni (ITA)

28 July 2024
21:00

Boxscore

France	109–79	Denmark
Scoring by quarter: 32–20, 36–22, 18–18, 23–19
Pts: Essengue 21; Rebs: Essengue 7 Asts: Traore 9		Pts: Norgaard 16; Rebs: Moller 7 Asts: Erichsen 7

Hakametsä 1
Attendance: 167
Referees: Petar Pesic (SRB), Andris Aunkrogers (LAT), Domen Krajnc (SLO)

29 July 2024
15:30

Boxscore

France	88–58	Sweden
Scoring by quarter: 24–21, 14–12, 29–15, 21–10
Pts: Diakite 14; Rebs: Sifferlin 7 Asts: Traore 8		Pts: Price 14; Rebs: Nzonyansi, Lindby 5 Asts: Nzonyansi 3

Hakametsä 2
Attendance: 222
Referees: Ofer Manheim (ISR), Elvis Binders-Coders (LAT), Alessandro Perciavalle (ITA)

29 July 2024
18:00

Boxscore

Denmark	87–95	Greece
Scoring by quarter: 17–25, 12–29, 23–18, 35–23
Pts: Erichsen 21; Rebs: Moller 9 Asts: Erichsen 8		Pts: Pagonis 19; Rebs: Pagonis 10; Asts: Liotopoulos 5

Hakametsä 2
Attendance: 164
Referees: Elias Anttonen (FIN), Domen Krajnc (SLO), Gvidas Gedvilas (LTU)

=== Group C ===
Pos	Team	Pld	W	L	PF	PA	PD	Pts
1	Serbia	3	3	0	272	227	+45	6
2	Italy	3	2	1	251	228	+23	5
3	Israel	3	1	2	243	276	−33	4
4	Latvia	3	0	3	238	273	−35	3

Source: FIBA

27 July 2024
15:30

Boxscore

Italy	72–78	Serbia
Scoring by quarter: 17–17, 19–16, 14–21, 22–24
Pts: Sarr 18; Rebs: Suigo 15; Asts: Miccoli 5		Pts: Dimitrijević 15; Rebs: Bošnjaković 10; Asts: Drezgić, Šojić 4

Hakametsä 2
Attendance: 285
Referees: Can Mavisu (TUR), Christian Theis (GER), Kirile Tvauri (GEO)

27 July 2024
18:00

Boxscore

Latvia	86–90	Israel
Scoring by quarter: 19–14, 24–25, 21–25, 22–26
Pts: Kilups 19; Rebs: Skrinda 14; Asts: Andzevs 6		Pts: Saraf 31; Rebs: Mayer 10; Asts: Saraf 8

Hakametsä 2
Attendance: 147
Referees: Nikola Perlic (CRO), Martin Van Hoye (BEL), Christian Hansen (DEN)

28 July 2024
13:30

Boxscore

Israel	80–89	Italy
Scoring by quarter: 25–20, 20–27, 14–18, 21–24
Pts: Saraf 19; Rebs: Mayer 13; Asts: Saraf 7		Pts: Sarr 18; Rebs: Sarr 13; Asts: Sarr 11

Hakametsä 1
Attendance: 283
Referees: Radomir Vojinovic (MNE), Hrvoje Cavar (BIH), Balazs Meszaros (HUN)

28 July 2024
20:30

Boxscore

Serbia	93–82	Latvia
Scoring by quarter: 24–24, 28–25, 21–11, 20–22
Pts: Drezgić 29; Rebs: Šojić 7 Asts: Srzentić, Stanojević 4		Pts: Sulcs 20; Rebs: Skrinda 10; Asts: Andzevs 4

Hakametsä 2
Attendance: 183
Referees: Yener Yilmaz (TUR), Ioannis Tsibouris (GRE), Martin Van Hoye (BEL)

29 July 2024
16:00

Boxscore

Serbia	101–73	Israel
Scoring by quarter: 26–16, 22–24, 25–16, 28–17
Pts: Kostić 14; Rebs: Tofoski 7 Asts: Tofoski 6		Pts: Belaga 20; Rebs: Belaga 7 Asts: Saraf 4

Hakametsä 1
Attendance: 90
Referees: Edgard Ceccarelli (FRA), Kirile Tvauri (GEO), Martin Van Hoye (BEL)

29 July 2024
21:00

Boxscore

Latvia	70–90	Italy
Scoring by quarter: 15–18, 23–22, 12–23, 20–27
Pts: Skrinda 21; Rebs: Skrinda 10; Asts: Andzevs 6		Pts: Airhienbuwa 17; Rebs: Suigo 10; Asts: Four players 3

Hakametsä 1
Attendance: 83
Referees: Christian Theis (GER), Joona Haaja (FIN), Christian Hansen (DEN)

=== Group D ===
Pos	Team	Pld	W	L	PF	PA	PD	Pts
1	Slovenia	3	3	0	275	218	+57	6
2	Spain	3	1	2	238	223	+15	4
3	Lithuania	3	1	2	259	262	−3	4
4	Finland	3	1	2	181	250	−69	4

Source: FIBA

27 July 2024
13:30

Boxscore

Slovenia	83–79	Spain
Scoring by quarter: 22–19, 21–25, 19–19, 21–16
Pts: Smrekar 22; Rebs: Kroflič 11; Asts: Kroflič 7		Pts: Saint-Supéry 25; Rebs: Saint-Supéry 10; Asts: Saint-Supéry 10

Hakametsä 1
Attendance: 235
Referees: Yener Yilmaz (TUR), Ioannis Tsibouris (GRE), Hrvoje Cavar (BIH)

27 July 2024
18:30

Boxscore

Finland	81–80	Lithuania
Scoring by quarter: 15–23, 21–18, 21–14, 24–25
Pts: Abbey 23; Rebs: Suutela 19; Asts: Nieminen 3		Pts: Jakucionis 18; Rebs: Juzenas 9 Asts: Jakucionis 6

Hakametsä 1
Attendance: 1,522
Referees: Radomir Vojinovic (MNE), Edgard Ceccarelli (FRA), Balazs Meszaros (HUN)

28 July 2024
13:00

Boxscore

Lithuania	95–100	Slovenia
Scoring by quarter: 23–30, 27–15, 23–28, 22–27
Pts: Jakucionis 24; Rebs: Raupelis 10; Asts: Jakucionis, Krizanauskas 5		Pts: Kroflič 20; Rebs: Smrekar 7 Asts: Kroflič 5

Hakametsä 2
Attendance: 215
Referees: Edgard Ceccarelli (FRA), Christian Theis (GER), Kirile Tvauri (GEO)

28 July 2024
18:30

Boxscore

Spain	78–56	Finland
Scoring by quarter: 21–14, 19–15, 23–18, 15–9
Pts: Saint-Supéry 26; Rebs: Valero 8 Asts: Alocen, Saint-Supéry 3		Pts: Abbey 11; Rebs: Suutela 12; Asts: Adler, Suutela 3

Hakametsä 1
Attendance: 1,771
Referees: Nikola Perlic (CRO), Can Mavisu (TUR), Christian Hansen (DEN)

29 July 2024
18:30

Boxscore

Finland	44–92	Slovenia
Scoring by quarter: 18–22, 5–24, 12–26, 9–20
Pts: Ekwere 11; Rebs: Suutela 7 Asts: Blomfelt, Ekwere 3		Pts: Ivicic 23; Rebs: Kroflič 8 Asts: Kroflič, Jereb 4

Hakametsä 1
Attendance: 1,375
Referees: Yener Yilmaz (TUR), Ioannis Tsibouris (GRE), Balazs Meszaros (HUN)

29 July 2024
20:30

Boxscore

Spain	81–84	Lithuania
Scoring by quarter: 24–23, 20–16, 17–16, 20–29
Pts: Gonzalez 26; Rebs: Gonzalez 9 Asts: Saint-Supéry 6		Pts: Indrusaitis 25; Rebs: Juzenas, Jakucionis 5 Asts: Jakucionis 5

Hakametsä 2
Attendance: 485
Referees: Radomir Vojinovic (MNE), Nikola Perlic (CRO), Can Mavisu (TUR)

== Playoff brackets ==
=== Main bracket ===
Round of 16
31 July
Germany	80
Denmark	74
31 July
Italy	85
Lithuania	94
31 July
Sweden	91
Croatia	66
31 July
Slovenia (OT)	91
Latvia	85
31 July
Belgium	66
Greece	62
31 July
Serbia	81
Finland	67
31 July
France	92
Turkey	58
31 July
Spain	89
Israel	102

Quarterfinals
1 August
Germany	87
Lithuania	86
1 August
Sweden	56
Slovenia	79
1 August
Belgium	76
Serbia	88
1 August
France	72
Israel	85

Semifinals
3 August
Germany	88
Slovenia	68
3 August
Serbia (2OT)	115
Israel	114

Final
4 August
Germany	93
Serbia	83
3rd place match
4 August
Slovenia	84
Israel	70

=== 5th place bracket ===
5th–8th place semifinals
3 August
Lithuania	89
Sweden	80
3 August
Belgium	73
France	80

5th place match
4 August
Lithuania	89
France	99
7th place match
4 August
Sweden	81
Belgium	84

=== 9th place bracket ===
9th–16th place quarterfinals
1 August
Denmark	77
Italy	90
1 August
Croatia	60
Latvia	72
1 August
Greece	79
Finland	72
1 August
Turkey	84
Spain	68

9th–12th place semifinals
3 August
Italy	67
Latvia	59
3 August
Greece	81
Turkey	61

9th place match
4 August
Italy	70
Greece	68
11th place match
4 August
Latvia	66
Turkey	89

=== 13th place bracket ===
13th–16th place semifinals
3 August
Denmark	82
Croatia	102
3 August
Finland	65
Spain	71

13th place match
4 August
Croatia	71
Spain	89
15th place match
4 August
Denmark	81
Finland	94

== Playoff results ==
=== Round of 16 ===
31 July 2024
13:00

Boxscore

Sweden	91–66	Croatia
Scoring by quarter: 25–17, 21–17, 25–12, 20–20
Pts: Price 26; Rebs: Obenjo 11; Asts: Price 6		Pts: Juric 19; Rebs: Torbarina 7 Asts: Dolic 4

Hakametsä 2, Tampere
Attendance: 155
Referees: Can Mavisu (TUR), Ioannis Tsibouris (GRE), Balazs Meszaros (HUN)

31 July 2024
13:30

Boxscore

Germany	80–74	Denmark
Scoring by quarter: 21–18, 24–16, 15–18, 20–22
Pts: Steinbach 25; Rebs: Steinbach 17; Asts: Kayil 7		Pts: Erichsen 18; Rebs: Moller 8 Asts: Erichsen 7

Hakametsä 1, Tampere
Attendance: 202
Referees: Joona Haaja (FIN), Radomir Vojinovic (MNE), Martin Van Hoye (BEL)

31 July 2024
15:30

Boxscore

Slovenia	91–85 (OT)	Latvia
Scoring by quarter: 20–15, 16–20, 23–27, 18–15, Overtime: 14–8
Pts: Kroflič 27; Rebs: Kroflič 9 Asts: Smrekar 8		Pts: Sulcs 22; Rebs: Skrinda 15; Asts: Skrinda, Andzevs 5

Hakametsä 2, Tampere
Attendance: 315
Referees: Gintaras Maciulis (LTU), Alessandro Perciavalle (ITA), Kirile Tvauri (GEO)

31 July 2024
16:00

Boxscore

Italy	85–94	Lithuania
Scoring by quarter: 21–26, 18–26, 12–21, 34–21
Pts: Assui 19; Rebs: Suigo 6 Asts: Valesin 5		Pts: Jakucionis 21; Rebs: Raupelis 9 Asts: Indrusaitis 4

Hakametsä 1, Tampere
Attendance: 212
Referees: Andris Aunkrogers (LAT), Petar Pesic (SRB), Domen Krajnc (SLO)

31 July 2024
18:00

Boxscore

France	92–58	Turkey
Scoring by quarter: 22–6, 21–14, 21–22, 28–16
Pts: Traore 16; Rebs: Essengue 9 Asts: Traore 6		Pts: Onat 16; Rebs: three players 5 Asts: Onat 4

Hakametsä 2, Tampere
Attendance: 305
Referees: Christian Theis (GER), Elias Anttonen (FIN), Christian Hansen (DEN)

31 July 2024
18:30

Boxscore

Serbia	81–67	Finland
Scoring by quarter: 21–16, 16–10, 22–24, 22–17
Pts: Dimitrijević 15; Rebs: Miloš Šojić 11; Asts: Šojić 4		Pts: Adler 17; Rebs: Suutela 7 Asts: Blomfelt 4

Hakametsä 1, Tampere
Attendance: 1,023
Referees: Edgard Ceccarelli (FRA), Ofer Manheim (ISR), Javier Torres Sanchez (ESP)

31 July 2024
20:30

Boxscore

Spain	89–102	Israel
Scoring by quarter: 18–19, 20–25, 19–29, 32–29
Pts: Gonzalez 32; Rebs: Carot 9 Asts: three players 4		Pts: Saraf 40; Rebs: Saraf 8 Asts: Mayer 7

Hakametsä 2, Tampere
Attendance: 480
Referees: Gvidas Gedvilas (LTU), Valerio Grigioni (ITA), Elvis Binders–Coders (LAT)

31 July 2024
21:00

Boxscore

Belgium	66–62	Greece
Scoring by quarter: 11–22, 17–13, 18–19, 20–8
Pts: Hodge 15; Rebs: Hodge 10; Asts: Tallir 7		Pts: Liotopoulos 14; Rebs: Patrikis 12; Asts: Abosi, Avdalas 2

Hakametsä 1, Tampere
Attendance: 155
Referees: Yener Yilmaz (TUR), Nikola Perlic (CRO), Hrvoje Cavar (BIH)

=== 9th–16th place quarterfinals ===
1 August 2024
13:00

Boxscore

Denmark	77–90	Italy
Scoring by quarter: 15–23, 14–24, 22–23, 26–20
Pts: Norgaard 21; Rebs: Novovic 6 Asts: Braikia 5		Pts: Atamah 16; Rebs: Iannuzzi 6 Asts: Valesin 9

Hakametsä 2, Tampere
Attendance: 125
Referees: Radomir Vojinovic (MNE), Christian Theis (GER), Balazs Meszaros (HUN)

1 August 2024
15:30

Boxscore

Croatia	60–72	Latvia
Scoring by quarter: 20-21, 18-20, 12-15, 10-16
Pts: Pavkovic 14; Rebs: Juric 8 Asts: Torbarina 4		Pts: Skinda 22; Rebs: Vavers 8 Asts: Sulcs 7

Hakametsä 2, Tampere
Attendance: 95
Referees: Javier Torres Sanchez (ESP), Ofer Manheim (ISR), Martin Van Hoye (BEL)

1 August 2024
18:00

Boxscore

Greece	79–72	Finland
Scoring by quarter: 18–17, 19–17, 26–17, 16–21
Pts: Liotopoulos 20; Rebs: Spartalis 7 Asts: Liotopoulos 5		Pts: Abbey 21; Rebs: Adler 9 Asts: three players 3

Hakametsä 2, Tampere
Attendance: 500
Referees: Valerio Grigioni (ITA), Gvidas Gedvilas (LTU), Domen Krajnc (SLO)

1 August 2024
20:30

Boxscore

Turkey	84–68	Spain
Scoring by quarter: 22–16, 28–13, 25–22, 9–17
Pts: Altuntas 22; Rebs: Altuntas 13; Asts: Onat 6		Pts: Gonzalez 20; Rebs: Enabulele 9 Asts: Alocen, Sola 4

Hakametsä 2, Tampere
Attendance: 175
Referees: Alessandro Perciavalle (ITA), Nikola Perlic (CRO), Christian Hansen (DEN)

=== 13th–16th place semifinals ===
3 August 2024
13:30

Boxscore

Denmark	82–102	Croatia
Scoring by quarter: 17–30, 17–24, 29–29, 19–19
Pts: Allersted 17; Rebs: Moller 10; Asts: Moller 7		Pts: Volf 21; Rebs: Grbic, Torbarina 7 Asts: Jemo 8

Hakametsä 1, Tampere
Attendance: 105
Referees: Christian Theis (GER), Gintaras Maciulis (LTU), Ioannis Tsibouris (GRE)

3 August 2024
16:00

Boxscore

Finland	65–71	Spain
Scoring by quarter: 13–18, 27–14, 13–20, 12–19
Pts: Abbey 21; Rebs: Suutela 8 Asts: Heinonen 5		Pts: Gonzalez 30; Rebs: Gonzalez, Carot 8 Asts: Saint-Supéry 10

Hakametsä 1, Tampere
Attendance: 775
Referees: Yener Yilmaz (TUR), Radomir Vojinovic (MNE), Kirile Tvauri (GEO)

=== 15th place match ===
4 August 2024
13:30

Boxscore

Denmark	81–94	Finland
Scoring by quarter: 24–26, 20–23, 20–32, 17–13
Pts: Moller 18; Rebs: Moller 11; Asts: Braikia 6		Pts: Adler 23; Rebs: Ekwere 7 Asts: Ekwere, Adler 5

Hakametsä 1, Tampere
Attendance: 425
Referees: Alessandro Perciavalle (ITA), Martin Van Hoye (BEL), Domen Krajnc (SLO)

=== 13th place match ===
4 August 2024
13:30

Boxscore

Croatia	71–89	Spain
Scoring by quarter: 20–16, 13–29, 25–22, 13–22
Pts: Torbarina 13; Rebs: Pavkovic, Volf 5 Asts: Torbarina 4		Pts: Saint-Supéry 20; Rebs: Gonzalez 6 Asts: Saint-Supéry 10

Hakametsä 2, Tampere
Attendance: 105
Referees: Gvidas Gedvilas (LTU), Joona Haaja (FIN), Can Mavisu (TUR)

=== 9th–12th place semifinals ===
3 August 2024
13:00

Boxscore

Italy	67–59	Latvia
Scoring by quarter: 13–17, 9–17, 30–9, 15–16
Pts: Assui 16; Rebs: Atamah 9 Asts: Sarr, Valesin 5		Pts: Skrinda 16; Rebs: Skrinda 10; Asts: Andzevs 8

Hakametsä 2, Tampere
Attendance: 129
Referees: Ofer Manheim (ISR), Christian Hansen (DEN), Domen Krajnc (SLO)

3 August 2024
15:30

Boxscore

Greece	81–61	Turkey
Scoring by quarter: 14–14, 21–21, 24–11, 22–15
Pts: Pagonis 19; Rebs: Abosi 8 Asts: Avdalas 5		Pts: Ustun 11; Rebs: Altuntas 7 Asts: Alisan 5

Hakametsä 2, Tampere
Attendance: 137
Referees: Hrvoje Cavar (BIH), Martin Van Hoye (BEL), Balazs Meszaros (HUN)

=== 11th place match ===
4 August 2024
11:00

Boxscore

Latvia	66–89	Turkey
Scoring by quarter: 17–22, 15–24, 21–12, 13–31
Pts: Skrinda 18; Rebs: Skrinda 8 Asts: Andzevs 7		Pts: Ustun 20; Rebs: Altuntas 9 Asts: Ustun 10

Hakametsä 2, Tampere
Attendance: 64
Referees: Ofer Manheim (ISR), Christian Hansen (DEN), Ioannis Tsibouris (GRE)

=== 9th place match ===
4 August 2024
16:00

Boxscore

Italy	70–68	Greece
Scoring by quarter: 8–8, 23–30, 25–12, 14–18
Pts: Sarr 24; Rebs: Sarr 12; Asts: Miccoli 5		Pts: Pagonis 14; Rebs: Pagonis 11; Asts: Vlassis, Liotopoulos 3

Hakametsä 2, Tampere
Attendance: 55
Referees: Javier Torres Sanchez (ESP), Kirile Tvauri (GEO), Balazs Meszaros (HUN)

=== Championship quarterfinals ===
1 August 2024
13:30

Boxscore

Germany	87–86	Lithuania
Scoring by quarter: 22–24, 27–23, 15–19, 23–20
Pts: Kayil 22; Rebs: Steinbach 18; Asts: Anderson 7		Pts: Indrusaitis 22; Rebs: Smirnov 8 Asts: Jakucionis, Laurencikas 5

Hakametsä 1, Tampere
Attendance: 245
Referees: Yener Yilmaz (TUR), Elias Anttonen (FIN), Petar Pesic (SRB)

1 August 2024
16:00

Boxscore

Sweden	56–79	Slovenia
Scoring by quarter: 16–21, 16–15, 9–17, 15–26
Pts: Pohto, Lindby 12; Rebs: Pohto 11; Asts: Nzonyansi 9		Pts: Kroflič 21; Rebs: Kroflič 12; Asts: Morano Mahmutovic 5

Hakametsä 1, Tampere
Attendance: 205
Referees: Andris Aunkrogers (LAT), Edgard Ceccarelli (FRA), Elvis Binders–Coders (LAT)

1 August 2024
18:30

Boxscore

Belgium	76–88	Serbia
Scoring by quarter: 18–24, 21–25, 21–20, 16–19
Pts: Hodge 21; Rebs: Giltay 11; Asts: Tallir 9		Pts: Šojić 23; Rebs: Šojić 12; Asts: Drezgić 8

Hakametsä 1, Tampere
Attendance: 285
Referees: Can Mavisu (TUR), Kirile Tvauri (GEO), Ioannis Tsibouris (GRE)

1 August 2024
21:00

Boxscore

France	72–85	Israel
Scoring by quarter: 24–21, 18–20, 15–31, 15–13
Pts: Essengue 28; Rebs: four players 7 Asts: Traore 9		Pts: Mayer 31; Rebs: Mayer 6 Asts: Goldman 6

Hakametsä 1, Tampere
Attendance: 255
Referees: Gintaras Maciulis (LTU), Hrvoje Cavar (BIH), Joona Haaja (FIN)

=== 5th–8th place semifinals ===
3 August 2024
18:00

Boxscore

Lithuania	89–80	Sweden
Scoring by quarter: 19–20, 21–20, 23–20, 26–20
Pts: Indrusaitis 30; Rebs: Raupelis 10; Asts: Indrusaitis, Jakucionis 6		Pts: Price 34; Rebs: Obenjo 10; Asts: Pohto 6

Hakametsä 2, Tampere
Attendance: 105
Referees: Nikola Perlic (CRO), Elias Anttonen (FIN), Can Mavisu (TUR)

3 August 2024
20:30

Boxscore

Belgium	73–80	France
Scoring by quarter: 17–29, 22–21, 13–14, 21–16
Pts: Hodge 16; Rebs: Hodge 8 Asts: Tallir, Hodge 5		Pts: Essengue 22; Rebs: Essengue 12; Asts: Traore 10

Hakametsä 2, Tampere
Attendance: 255
Referees: Petar Pesic (SRB), Javier Torres Sanchez (ESP), Alessandro Perciavalle (ITA)

=== 7th place match ===
4 August 2024
18:30

Boxscore

Sweden	81–84	Belgium
Scoring by quarter: 23–22, 22–16, 17–20, 19–26
Pts: Obenjo 21; Rebs: Obenjo 8 Asts: Price 8		Pts: Efono 26; Rebs: three players 6 Asts: Hodge 6

Hakametsä 2, Tampere
Referees: Radomir Vojinovic (MNE), Elias Anttonen (FIN), Elvis Binders–Coders

=== 5th place match ===
4 August 2024
16:00

Boxscore

Lithuania	89–99	France
Scoring by quarter: 28–27, 16–28, 28–21, 17–23
Pts: Jakucionis 37; Rebs: Juzenas 7 Asts: Jakucionis 7		Pts: Traore 29; Rebs: Essengue 7 Asts: Traore 11

Hakametsä 1, Tampere
Attendance: 305
Referees: Nikola Perlic (CRO), Valerio Grigioni (ITA), Hrvoje Cavar (BIH)

=== Championship semifinals ===
3 August 2024
18:30

Boxscore

Germany	88–68	Slovenia
Scoring by quarter: 18–21, 23–21, 24–12, 23–14
Pts: Anderson 25; Rebs: Steinbach 11; Asts: Kharchenkov 7		Pts: Padjen 18; Rebs: Kroflič 7 Asts: Kroflič 5

Hakametsä 1, Tampere
Attendance: 425
Referees: Andris Aunkrogers (LAT), Joona Haaja (FIN), Valerio Grigioni (ITA)

3 August 2024
21:00

Boxscore

Serbia	115–114 (2OT)	Israel
Scoring by quarter: 23–18, 17–26, 26–19, 23–26, Overtime: 11–11, 15–14
Pts: Drezgić 35; Rebs: Dimitrijević 14; Asts: Drezgić 12		Pts: Saraf 40; Rebs: Saraf 6 Asts: Mayer 8

Hakametsä 1, Tampere
Attendance: 215
Referees: Gvidas Gedvilas (LTU), Edgard Ceccarelli (FRA), Elvis Binders–Coders (LAT)

=== 3rd place match ===
4 August 2024
18:30

Boxscore

Slovenia	84–70	Israel
Scoring by quarter: 24–16, 16–22, 23–13, 21–19
Pts: Hrabar 24; Rebs: Smrekar 9 Asts: Kroflič 9		Pts: Saraf 26; Rebs: Mayer 9 Asts: Mayer 8

Hakametsä 1, Tampere
Attendance: 520
Referees: Petar Pesic (SRB), Christian Theis (GER), Andris Aunkrogers (LAT)

=== Final ===
4 August 2024
21:00

Boxscore

Germany	93–83	Serbia
Scoring by quarter: 33–19, 18–26, 16–13, 26–25
Pts: Anderson 31; Rebs: Kharchenkov 10; Asts: Kharchenkov 8		Pts: Drezgić 30; Rebs: Stanojević 9 Asts: Drezgić 7

Hakametsä 1, Tampere
Attendance: 905
Referees: Yener Yilmaz (TUR), Gintaras Maciulis (LTU), Edgard Ceccarelli (FRA)

== Final standings ==
Rank	Team	Record
1st place, gold medalist(s)	Germany	7–0
2nd place, silver medalist(s)	Serbia	6–1
3rd place, bronze medalist(s)	Slovenia	6–1
4	Israel	3–4
5	France	6–1
6	Lithuania	3–4
7	Belgium	4–3
8	Sweden	3–4
9	Italy	5–2
10	Greece	3–4
11	Turkey	2–5
12	Latvia	1–6
13	Spain	3–4
14	Croatia	2–5
15	Finland	2–5
16	Denmark	0–7

Qualified for the 2025 FIBA Under-19 Basketball World Cup
Relegated to the 2025 FIBA U18 EuroBasket Division B

2024 FIBA U18 EuroBasket champions

Germany
First title

== Awards ==
The awards were announced on 4 August 2024.

Award	Player
All-Tournament Team	(Germany) Christian Anderson Jr.
All-Tournament Team	(Serbia) Savo Drezgić
All-Tournament Team	(Slovenia) Urban Kroflič
All-Tournament Team	(Israel) Ben Saraf
All-Tournament Team	(Germany) Hannes Steinbach
Most Valuable Player	(Israel) Ben Saraf

== See also ==
- 2024 FIBA U18 EuroBasket Division B
- 2024 FIBA U18 EuroBasket Division C
