= Kristers =

Male given name

- Gender: Male
- Language: Latvian
- Name day: 18 December

Origin
- Origin: Latin
- Meaning: follower of Christ
- Region of origin: Latvia

Other names
- Derived: From the Latin name Christianus, which in turn comes from the Greek word khristianós
- Related names: Kristofers, Kristaps, Krists (Latvian); Krister (Swedish); Christer (Scandinavian)

Kristers is a Latvian masculine given name. People bearing the name Kristers include:

- Kristers Aparjods (born 1998), luger
- Kristers Freibergs (born 1992), ice hockey defenceman
- Kristers Gudļevskis (born 1992), ice hockey goaltender
- Kristers Serģis (born 1974), sidecarcross rider
- Kristers Skrinda (born 2006), basketball player
- Kristers Tobers (born 2000), footballer
- Kristers Zoriks (born 1998), basketball player
