= Rasmus Persson =

Rasmus Persson may refer to:

- Rasmus Persson (footballer)
- Rasmus Persson (radio personality)
