= 2025 FIBA U20 EuroBasket =

International youth basketball tournament

Ευρωπαϊκό Πρωτάθλημα Καλαθοσφαίρισης Νέων Ανδρών 2025

Tournament details
- Host country: Greece
- City: Heraklion
- Dates: 12–20 July 2025
- Teams: 16 (from 1 confederation)
- Venues: 2 (in 1 host city)

Final positions
- Champions: Italy (3rd title)
- Runners-up: Lithuania
- Third place: France
- Fourth place: Serbia

Tournament statistics
- Games played: 56
- Attendance: 19,550 (349 per game)
- MVP: (Italy) Francesco Ferrari
- Top scorer: (Slovenia) Jan Vide (17.9 ppg)
- Top rebounds: (Spain) Alvaro Folgueiras (9.7 rpg)
- Top assists: (Greece) Neoklis Avdalas (8.0 apg)
- PPG (Team): Israel (88.4 ppg)
- RPG (Team): Greece (48.0 rpg)
- APG (Team): Greece (23.6 apg)

Official website
- www.fiba.basketball

The 2025 FIBA U20 EuroBasket was the 26th edition of the European basketball championship for men's national under-20 teams. The tournament was played in Heraklion, Greece, from 12 to 20 July 2025.

== Participating teams ==
- Belgium
- Czech Republic
- Finland ▲ (Third place, 2024 FIBA U20 EuroBasket Division B)
- France
- Germany
- Greece
- Iceland
- Israel
- Italy
- Lithuania
- Poland
- Romania ▲ (Winners, 2024 FIBA U20 EuroBasket Division B)
- Serbia
- Slovenia
- Spain
- Ukraine ▲ (Runners-up, 2024 FIBA U20 EuroBasket Division B)

== First round ==
The draw of the first round was held on 28 January 2025 in Freising, Germany.

In the first round, the teams were drawn into four groups of four. All teams advanced to the playoffs.

All times are local (Eastern European Summer Time; UTC+3).

=== Group A ===
Pos	Team	Pld	W	L	PF	PA	PD	Pts
1	Israel	3	3	0	258	218	+40	6
2	Poland	3	2	1	220	220	0	5
3	Spain	3	1	2	226	217	+9	4
4	Finland	3	0	3	206	255	−49	3

Source: FIBA

12 July 2025
13:00

Boxscore

Poland	78–66	Finland
Scoring by quarter: 31–23, 14–20, 20–7, 13–16
Pts: Sternicki 17; Rebs: Szumert 18; Asts: Szpakowski, Szumert 4		Pts: Amzil 19; Rebs: Suutela 11; Asts: three players 3

Nea Alikarnassos Arena
Attendance: 100
Referees: Zdenko Tomasovic (SVK), Iain MacDonald (GBR), Denys Povorozniuk (UKR)

12 July 2025
15:30

Boxscore

Israel	79–74	Spain
Scoring by quarter: 22–15, 28–15, 14–25, 15–19
Pts: Doron 25; Rebs: Michaeli 11; Asts: Vitlem 4		Pts: Langarita 28; Rebs: Iguodala 9 Asts: Fabrega 8

Nea Alikarnassos Arena
Attendance: 150
Referees: Nicolas Maestre (FRA), Alessandro Perciavalle (ITA), Janis Rozenbergs (LAT)

13 July 2025
13:00

Boxscore

Finland	69–88	Israel
Scoring by quarter: 25–20, 10–26, 10–17, 24–25
Pts: Abbey 15; Rebs: Amzil, Suutela 7 Asts: Abbey 5		Pts: Mayer 19; Rebs: Filonenko 7 Asts: Mayer 6

University of Crete Hall
Attendance: 100
Referees: Ilias Kounelles (CYP), Siniša Prpa (SRB), Roko Hordov (CRO)

13 July 2025
20:30

Boxscore

Spain	63–67	Poland
Scoring by quarter: 18–14, 15–10, 19–22, 11–21
Pts: Langarita 16; Rebs: Folgueiras 8 Asts: Fabrega 5		Pts: Szumert 13; Rebs: Sternicki 8 Asts: Szpakowski 7

University of Crete Hall
Attendance: 70
Referees: Ademir Zurapović (BIH), Blaz Zupancic (SLO), Bjarki Thor Davidsson (ISL)

14 July 2025
15:30

Boxscore

Poland	75–91	Israel
Scoring by quarter: 13–19, 27–18, 15–31, 20–23
Pts: Sternicki 22; Rebs: Nowicki 6 Asts: Szpakowski 5		Pts: Michaeli 28; Rebs: Michaeli 12; Asts: Mayer 11

Nea Alikarnassos Arena
Attendance: 200
Referees: Nicolas Maestre (FRA), Ilias Karpanos (GRE), Denys Povorozniuk (UKR)

14 July 2025
18:00

Boxscore

Spain	89–71	Finland
Scoring by quarter: 23–18, 25–18, 21–21, 20–14
Pts: Langarita 24; Rebs: Flores 8 Asts: Fabrega 11		Pts: Ekwere 18; Rebs: Ekwere 8 Asts: Abbey 5

University of Crete Hall
Referees: Mehmet Sahin (TUR), Jan Baloun (CZE), Janis Rozenbergs (LAT)

=== Group B ===
Pos	Team	Pld	W	L	PF	PA	PD	Pts
1	Greece	3	3	0	280	171	+109	6
2	Czechia	3	2	1	223	251	−28	5
3	Lithuania	3	1	2	250	232	+18	4
4	Romania	3	0	3	171	270	−99	3

Source: FIBA

12 July 2025
18:00

Boxscore

Lithuania	65–84	Greece
Scoring by quarter: 9–13, 25–21, 17–28, 14–22
Pts: Stonkus 13; Rebs: Bieliauskas 11; Asts: Stonkus 3		Pts: Samodurov 19; Rebs: Touliatos 8 Asts: Avdalas 7

Nea Alikarnassos Arena
Attendance: 2,100
Referees: Ademir Zurapović (BIH), Siniša Prpa (SRB), Roko Hordov (CRO)

12 July 2025
20:30

Boxscore

Czechia	75–65	Romania
Scoring by quarter: 23–16, 16–17, 21–17, 15–15
Pts: Svoboda 21; Rebs: Zvolanek 10; Asts: Cank 5		Pts: Somacescu 17; Rebs: Nitu 9 Asts: Blidaru, Somacescu 4

Nea Alikarnassos Arena
Attendance: 80
Referees: Blaz Zupancic (SLO), Rainis Värv (EST), Bjarki Thor Davidsson (ISL)

13 July 2025
15:30

Boxscore

Romania	66–106	Lithuania
Scoring by quarter: 23–25, 19–22, 9–30, 15–29
Pts: Somacescu 12; Rebs: Nitu, Diaconescu 5 Asts: four players 2		Pts: Laurencikas 17; Rebs: Bieliauskas 8 Asts: Laurencikas 5

University of Crete Hall
Attendance: 70
Referees: Nicolas Maestre (FRA), Iain Macdonald (GBR), Denys Povorozniuk (UKR)

13 July 2025
18:00

Boxscore

Greece	107–66	Czechia
Scoring by quarter: 30–24, 24–13, 35–14, 18–15
Pts: Samodurov 19; Rebs: Avdalas 15; Asts: Avdalas, Patrikis 5		Pts: Zvolanek 14; Rebs: three players 4 Asts: Svoboda 5

Nea Alikarnassos Arena
Attendance: 1,743
Referees: Julio Anaya (PAN), Alessandro Perciavalle (ITA), Janis Rozenbergs (LAT)

14 July 2025
13:00

Boxscore

Czechia	82–79	Lithuania
Scoring by quarter: 20–21, 22–26, 16–16, 24–16
Pts: Svoboda 19; Rebs: Stranel 6 Asts: Zvolanek 9		Pts: Stonkus, Krizanauskas 15; Rebs: Kocanas 9 Asts: Stuknys 9

University of Crete Hall
Attendance: 70
Referees: Alberto Sanchez (ESP), Siniša Prpa (SRB), Bjarki Thor Davidsson (ISL)

14 July 2025
18:00

Boxscore

Greece	89–40	Romania
Scoring by quarter: 25–8, 22–6, 18–14, 24–12
Pts: Patrikis 19; Rebs: Soulis 9 Asts: Paraskevopoulos 6		Pts: three players 8 Rebs: Nitu 6 Asts: Blidaru 6

Nea Alikarnassos Arena
Attendance: 1,500
Referees: Zdenko Tomasovic (SVK), Lukasz Jankowski (POL), Roko Hordov (CRO)

=== Group C ===
Pos	Team	Pld	W	L	PF	PA	PD	Pts
1	Germany	3	3	0	220	189	+31	6
2	Italy	3	2	1	215	195	+20	5
3	Belgium	3	1	2	189	208	−19	4
4	Ukraine	3	0	3	177	209	−32	3

Source: FIBA

12 July 2025
15:30

Boxscore

Belgium	64–68	Italy
Scoring by quarter: 22–16, 13–14, 10–17, 19–21
Pts: Polet 12; Rebs: Polet 9 Asts: Polet 5		Pts: Ferrari 12; Rebs: Osasuyi 12; Asts: Torresani 4

University of Crete Hall
Attendance: 50
Referees: Julio Anaya (PAN), Alberto Sanchez Sixto (ESP), Vlad-Theodor Cotrobas-Dascalu (ROU)

12 July 2025
18:00

Boxscore

Germany	64–62	Ukraine
Scoring by quarter: 18–15, 11–14, 15–14, 20–19
Pts: Falkenthal 15; Rebs: Defty 8 Asts: Falkenthal 5		Pts: Sushkin 19; Rebs: Sypalo 6 Asts: Sushkin 5

University of Crete Hall
Attendance: 120
Referees: Ilias Kounelles (CYP), Mehmet Sahin (TUR), Henri Hilke (FIN)

13 July 2025
13:00

Boxscore

Italy	67–71	Germany
Scoring by quarter: 12–16, 17–16, 26–14, 12–25
Pts: Ferrari 14; Rebs: Assui, Osasuyi 7 Asts: Assui 3		Pts: Kalu 20; Rebs: Kalu 9 Asts: Falkenthal 6

Nea Alikarnassos Arena
Attendance: 180
Referees: Gvidas Gedvilas (LTU), Lukasz Jankowski (POL), Ilias Karpanos (GRE)

13 July 2025
20:30

Boxscore

Ukraine	55–65	Belgium
Scoring by quarter: 12–10, 19–20, 14–15, 10–20
Pts: Sushkin, Sypalo 9 Rebs: Sypalo 8 Asts: Sushkin 6		Pts: Raedschelders 19; Rebs: Raedschelders 10; Asts: Isebaert 4

Nea Alikarnassos Arena
Attendance: 90
Referees: Luis Castillo (ESP), Jan Baloun (CZE), Ori Shalhavi (ISR)

14 July 2025
15:30

Boxscore

Germany	85–60	Belgium
Scoring by quarter: 28–14, 20–9, 20–16, 17–21
Pts: Kalu 28; Rebs: Defty 13; Asts: Trettin, Falkenthal 6		Pts: Zecevic 17; Rebs: Polet 5 Asts: Efono 7

University of Crete Hall
Attendance: 100
Referees: Ademir Zurapović (BIH), Rainis Värv (EST), Henri Hilke (FIN)

14 July 2025
20:30

Boxscore

Italy	80–60	Ukraine
Scoring by quarter: 27–5, 18–18, 18–20, 17–17
Pts: Torresani 14; Rebs: Ferrari 8 Asts: four players 3		Pts: Sypalo 11; Rebs: Sypalo 10; Asts: Kolawole 6

University of Crete Hall
Attendance: 50
Referees: Blaz Zupancic (SLO), Iain Macdonald (GBR), Vlad-Theodor Cotrobas-Dascalu (ROU)

=== Group D ===
Pos	Team	Pld	W	L	PF	PA	PD	Pts
1	Serbia	3	3	0	272	195	+77	6
2	France	3	2	1	229	201	+28	5
3	Iceland	3	1	2	205	249	−44	4
4	Slovenia	3	0	3	192	253	−61	3

Source: FIBA

12 July 2025
13:00

Boxscore

Serbia	90–76	Iceland
Scoring by quarter: 30–15, 22–17, 22–21, 16–23
Pts: Mikić 16; Rebs: Nikolić, Milošević 5 Asts: Ristić 7		Pts: Sigurtharson 25; Rebs: Ludviksson, Curtis 9 Asts: Curtis, Arnarson 5

University of Crete Hall
Attendance: 100
Referees: Gvidas Gedvilas (LTU), Jan Baloun (CZE), Ori Shalhavi (ISR)

12 July 2025
20:30

Boxscore

France	79–64	Slovenia
Scoring by quarter: 15–17, 17–7, 28–21, 19–19
Pts: Domon 18; Rebs: Jacques 10; Asts: Boisdur 4		Pts: Vide 13; Rebs: Dragan 6 Asts: Vide 5

University of Crete Hall
Attendance: 80
Referees: Luis Castillo (ESP), Lukasz Jankowski (POL), Ilias Karpanos (GRE)

13 July 2025
15:30

Boxscore

Iceland	53–85	France
Scoring by quarter: 12–25, 12–27, 21–10, 8–23
Pts: Bragason 19; Rebs: Ludviksson 11; Asts: Ludviksson 4		Pts: Malwaya 17; Rebs: Domon 8 Asts: Rieber, Domon 6

Nea Alikarnassos Arena
Attendance: 240
Referees: Mehmet Sahin (TUR), Rainis Värv (EST), Vlad-Theodor Cotrobas-Dascalu (ROU)

13 July 2025
18:00

Boxscore

Slovenia	54–98	Serbia
Scoring by quarter: 20–27, 12–16, 13–26, 9–29
Pts: Bandelj 9 Rebs: three players 5 Asts: three players 3		Pts: Gačić 22; Rebs: Malešević 9 Asts: Mušicki 6

University of Crete Hall
Attendance: 110
Referees: Zdenko Tomasovic (SVK), Alberto Sanchez Sixto (ESP), Henri Hilke (FIN)

14 July 2025
13:00

Boxscore

Slovenia	74–76	Iceland
Scoring by quarter: 16–18, 18–21, 12–19, 28–18
Pts: Vide 23; Rebs: Dragan 7 Asts: Vide 5		Pts: Curtis 20; Rebs: Curtis 11; Asts: Arnarson 7

Nea Alikarnassos Arena
Attendance: 80
Referees: Luis Castillo (ESP), Ilias Kounelles (CYP), Ori Shalhavi (ISR)

14 July 2025
20:30

Boxscore

Serbia	84–65	France
Scoring by quarter: 21–14, 22–20, 18–16, 23–15
Pts: Ristić 22; Rebs: Nikolić 10; Asts: Ristić 8		Pts: Malwaya, Domon 11; Rebs: Majstorovic 7 Asts: Pietrus 3

Nea Alikarnassos Arena
Attendance: 300
Referees: Julio Anaya (PAN), Gvidas Gedvilas (LTU), Alessandro Perciavalle (ITA)

== Knockout stage ==
=== Bracket ===
==== Main bracket ====
Round of 16
16 July
A1 Israel	119
B4 Romania	68
16 July
C2 Italy	101
D3 Iceland	58
16 July
A3 Spain	70
B2 Czechia	54
16 July
C4 Ukraine	61
D1 Serbia	75
16 July
A2 Poland	73
B3 Lithuania	84
16 July
C1 Germany	85
D4 Slovenia (OT)	86
16 July
A4 Finland	78
B1 Greece	85
16 July
C3 Belgium	57
D2 France	74

Quarterfinals
17 July
A1 Israel	80
C2 Italy	89
17 July
A3 Spain	66
D1 Serbia	76
17 July
B3 Lithuania	85
D4 Slovenia	67
17 July
B1 Greece	70
D2 France	72

Semifinals
19 July
C2 Italy	85
D1 Serbia	78
19 July
B3 Lithuania	81
D2 France	71

Final
20 July
C2 Italy	83
B3 Lithuania	66
3rd place match
20 July
D1 Serbia	62
D2 France	73

==== 5–8th place bracket ====
5th–8th place semifinals
19 July
A1 Israel	80
A3 Spain	69
19 July
D4 Slovenia	60
B1 Greece	82

5th place match
20 July
A1 Israel	82
B1 Greece	92
7th place match
20 July
A3 Spain	75
D4 Slovenia	77

==== 9–16th place bracket ====
9th–16th place quarterfinals
17 July
B4 Romania	72
D3 Iceland	57
17 July
B2 Czechia	85
C4 Ukraine	65
17 July
A2 Poland	83
C1 Germany	69
17 July
A4 Finland	74
C3 Belgium	79

9th–12th place semifinals
19 July
B4 Romania	61
B2 Czechia	75
19 July
A2 Poland	81
C3 Belgium	64

9th place match
20 July
B2 Czechia	94
A2 Poland	81
11th place match
20 July
B4 Romania	66
C3 Belgium	58

==== 13–16th place bracket ====
13th–16th place semifinals
19 July
D3 Iceland	88
C4 Ukraine	67
19 July
C1 Germany	82
A4 Finland	81

13th place match
20 July
D3 Iceland	56
C1 Germany	63
15th place match
20 July
C4 Ukraine	82
A4 Finland	84

=== Round of 16 ===
16 July 2025
13:00

Boxscore

Israel	119–68	Romania
Scoring by quarter: 35–20, 34–16, 28–19, 22–13
Pts: Abouloff 18; Rebs: Sela 12; Asts: Sela 7		Pts: Nitu, Papuc 10; Rebs: Nitu 6 Asts: Papuc 4

University of Crete Hall
Attendance: 200
Referees: Mehmet Sahin (TUR), Henri Hilke (FIN), Iain MacDonald (GBR)

16 July 2025
13:00

Boxscore

Czechia	54–70	Spain
Scoring by quarter: 16–13, 14–23, 13–20, 11–14
Pts: Zvolanek 12; Rebs: Kristan 6 Asts: three players 3		Pts: Torres de la Torre 20; Rebs: Folgueiras 8 Asts: Fabrega 11

Nea Alikarnassos Arena
Attendance: 230
Referees: Roko Hordov (CRO), Vlad-Theodor Cotrobas-Dascalu (ROU), Gvidas Gedvilas (LTU)

16 July 2025
15:30

Boxscore

Italy	101–58	Iceland
Scoring by quarter: 19–17, 31–11, 21–14, 30–16
Pts: three players 14; Rebs: Osasuyi 12; Asts: Trucchetti 5		Pts: Curtis 11; Rebs: Curtis 7 Asts: Curtis 3

University of Crete Hall
Attendance: 60
Referees: Ademir Zurapović (BIH), Janis Rozenbergs (LAT), Rainis Värv (EST)

16 July 2025
15:30

Boxscore

Serbia	75–61	Ukraine
Scoring by quarter: 18–13, 20–15, 20–20, 17–13
Pts: Gačić 21; Rebs: Nikolić 9 Asts: Ristić 11		Pts: Klitschko 19; Rebs: three players 8 Asts: Sushkin 4

Nea Alikarnassos Arena
Attendance: 190
Referees: Ilias Kounelles (CYP), Lukasz Jankowski (POL), Ilias Karpanos (GRE)

16 July 2025
18:00

Boxscore

Poland	73–84	Lithuania
Scoring by quarter: 20–16, 17–20, 18–23, 18–25
Pts: Cwik 22; Rebs: Nowicki 6 Asts: Szumert 5		Pts: Juzenas 16; Rebs: Bancevicius, Raupelis 8 Asts: Stuknys 9

University of Crete Hall
Attendance: 150
Referees: Julio Anaya (PAN), Alberto Sanchez (ESP), Jan Baloun (CZE)

16 July 2025
18:00

Boxscore

Greece	85–78	Finland
Scoring by quarter: 19–15, 18–18, 21–15, 27–30
Pts: Avdalas 23; Rebs: Samodurov 9 Asts: Avdalas 8		Pts: Abbey, Amzil 22; Rebs: Suutela 9 Asts: Abbey 8

Nea Alikarnassos Arena
Attendance: 1,893
Referees: Luis Castillo (ESP), Bjarki Thor Davidsson (ISL), Blaz Zupancic (SLO)

16 July 2025
20:30

Boxscore

Germany	85–86 (OT)	Slovenia
Scoring by quarter: 23–16, 16–18, 10–20, 23–18, Overtime: 13–14
Pts: Kalu 21; Rebs: Kalu 13; Asts: Falkenthal 5		Pts: Vide 23; Rebs: Urbanija 8 Asts: Pirs 5

University of Crete Hall
Attendance: 130
Referees: Nicolas Maestre (FRA), Zdenko Tomasovic (SVK), Denys Povorozniuk (UKR)

16 July 2025
20:30

Boxscore

France	74–57	Belgium
Scoring by quarter: 17–13, 27–17, 11–12, 19–15
Pts: Pietrus 16; Rebs: Jacques 8 Asts: Boisdur 7		Pts: Efono 14; Rebs: Polet 6 Asts: Polet 4

Nea Alikarnassos Arena
Attendance: 371
Referees: Siniša Prpa (SRB), Alessandro Perciavalle (ITA), Ori Shalhavi (ISR)

=== 9th–16th place quarterfinals ===
17 July 2025
13:00

Boxscore

Romania	72–57	Iceland
Scoring by quarter: 20–22, 15–17, 18–9, 19–9
Pts: Somacescu 28; Rebs: Nitu 16; Asts: Somacescu 5		Pts: Arnarson 23; Rebs: Thrastarson 9 Asts: Arnarson 4

University of Crete Hall
Attendance: 60
Referees: Ilias Kounelles (CYP), Roko Hordov (CRO), Ori Shalhavi (ISR)

17 July 2025
15:30

Boxscore

Czechia	85–65	Ukraine
Scoring by quarter: 23–8, 21–16, 11–21, 30–20
Pts: Svoboda 21; Rebs: M. Zvolanek, J. Zvolanek 8 Asts: J. Zvolanek 8		Pts: Romanytsia 15; Rebs: Klitschko 7 Asts: Romanytsia 3

University of Crete Hall
Attendance: 40
Referees: Gvidas Gedvilas (LTU), Henri Hilke (FIN), Iain Macdonald (GBR)

17 July 2025
18:00

Boxscore

Finland	74–79	Belgium
Scoring by quarter: 17–15, 18–23, 20–29, 19–12
Pts: Ekwere 26; Rebs: Ekwere, Amzil 9 Asts: Abbey 10		Pts: Efono 21; Rebs: Raedschelders 13; Asts: Raedschelders 9

University of Crete Hall
Attendance: 57
Referees: Alberto Sanchez (ESP), Rainis Värv (EST), Bjarki Thor Davidsson (ISL)

17 July 2025
20:30

Boxscore

Poland	83–69	Germany
Scoring by quarter: 21–14, 20–17, 21–22, 21–16
Pts: Szumert 24; Rebs: Szumert 8 Asts: Sowinski 8		Pts: Grey 17; Rebs: Kalu 8 Asts: Krupnikas 4

University of Crete Hall
Attendance: 50
Referees: Blaz Zupancic (SLO), Vlad-Theodor Cotrobas-Dascalu (ROU), Denys Povorozniuk (UKR)

=== 13th–16th place semifinals ===
19 July 2025
13:00

Boxscore

Iceland	88–67	Ukraine
Scoring by quarter: 29–6, 29–21, 13–20, 17–20
Pts: Ingolfsson 27; Rebs: Curtis 8 Asts: Thrastarson 4		Pts: Lokhmanchuk 12; Rebs: Sytar 10; Asts: Sushkin 7

University of Crete Hall
Attendance: 50
Referees: Lukasz Jankowski (POL), Ilias Karpanos (GRE), Vlad-Theodor Cotrobas-Dascalu (ROU)

19 July 2025
15:30

Boxscore

Germany	82–81	Finland
Scoring by quarter: 14–17, 22–22, 23–15, 23–27
Pts: Grey 17; Rebs: Schroeder 7 Asts: Grey 6		Pts: Ekwere 25; Rebs: three players 6 Asts: Abbey 8

University of Crete Hall
Referees: Mehmet Sahin (TUR), Jan Baloun (CZE), Ori Shalhavi (ISR)

=== 15th place match ===
20 July 2025
10:30

Boxscore

Ukraine	82–84	Finland
Scoring by quarter: 28–11, 17–20, 16–20, 21–33
Pts: Sushkin 26; Rebs: Sytar 14; Asts: five players 2		Pts: Ekwere 22; Rebs: Ekwere 7 Asts: Abbey 13

University of Crete Hall
Attendance: 20
Referees: Zdenko Tomasovic (SVK), Janis Rozenbergs (LAT), Bjarki Thor Davidsson (ISL)

=== 13th place match ===
20 July 2025
15:30

Boxscore

Iceland	56–63	Germany
Scoring by quarter: 11–17, 12–10, 19–11, 14–25
Pts: Ingolfsson 25; Rebs: Thrastarson 9 Asts: Arnarson 7		Pts: Grey 18; Rebs: Schroeder 11; Asts: Krupnikas 6

Nea Alikarnassos Arena
Attendance: 100
Referees: Ademir Zurapović (BIH), Siniša Prpa (SRB), Roko Hordov (CRO)

=== 9th–12th place semifinals ===
19 July 2025
18:00

Boxscore

Romania	61–75	Czechia
Scoring by quarter: 14–19, 13–22, 25–18, 9–16
Pts: Nitu 18; Rebs: Oinaru 8 Asts: Nitu 7		Pts: Stranel 17; Rebs: Stranel 14; Asts: three players 2

University of Crete Hall
Attendance: 58
Referees: Siniša Prpa (SRB), Henri Hilke (FIN), Denys Povorozniuk (UKR)

19 July 2025
20:30

Boxscore

Poland	81–64	Belgium
Scoring by quarter: 17–17, 18–16, 23–17, 23–14
Pts: Nowicki 12; Rebs: Nagel, Nowicki 7 Asts: Szpakowski 8		Pts: three players 10; Rebs: Mbessang 8 Asts: Efono 7

University of Crete Hall
Attendance: 30
Referees: Nicolas Maestre (FRA), Iain Macdonald (GBR), Bjarki Thor Davidsson (ISL)

=== 11th place match ===
20 July 2025
13:00

Boxscore

Romania	66–58	Belgium
Scoring by quarter: 20–9, 20–22, 14–14, 12–13
Pts: Nitu 19; Rebs: Diaconescu 9 Asts: Diaconescu 4		Pts: Schoentgen 12; Rebs: Zecevic 12; Asts: Efono 5

University of Crete Hall
Attendance: 69
Referees: Henri Hilke (FIN), Iain Macdonald (GBR), Ilias Karpanos (GRE)

=== 9th place match ===
20 July 2025
15:30

Boxscore

Czechia	94–81	Poland
Scoring by quarter: 26–20, 13–11, 27–25, 28–25
Pts: J. Zvolanek 16; Rebs: Suchanek 10; Asts: Bubenik 6		Pts: Cwik 20; Rebs: Sternicki 8 Asts: Sowinski, Szpakowski 7

University of Crete Hall
Attendance: 36
Referees: Alberto Sanchez (ESP), Ori Shalhavi (ISR), Vlad-Theodor Cotrobas-Dascalu (ROU)

=== Championship quarterfinals ===
17 July 2025
13:00

Boxscore

Israel	80–89	Italy
Scoring by quarter: 25–24, 28–15, 18–25, 9–25
Pts: Michaeli 21; Rebs: Michaeli 8 Asts: Vitlem, Mayer 5		Pts: Assui 22; Rebs: Osasuyi 9 Asts: Trucchetti 5

Nea Alikarnassos Arena
Attendance: 183
Referees: Nicolas Maestre (FRA), Jan Baloun (CZE), Ilias Karpanos (GRE)

17 July 2025
15:30

Boxscore

Spain	66–76	Serbia
Scoring by quarter: 22–16, 13–14, 14–15, 17–31
Pts: Fabrega, Folgueiras 13; Rebs: Folgueiras 11; Asts: Fabrega 8		Pts: Nikolić 22; Rebs: Savanović 10; Asts: Ristić 5

Nea Alikarnassos Arena
Attendance: 412
Referees: Julio Anaya (PAN), Mehmet Sahin (TUR), Janis Rozenbergs (LAT)

17 July 2025
18:00

Boxscore

Greece	70–72	France
Scoring by quarter: 20–24, 19–17, 12–11, 19–20
Pts: Avdalas 17; Rebs: Samodurov 8 Asts: Avdalas 10		Pts: Domon 18; Rebs: Domon 9 Asts: Pietrus, Domon 4

Nea Alikarnassos Arena
Attendance: 3,154
Referees: Ademir Zurapović (BIH), Zdenko Tomasovic (SVK), Lukasz Jankowski (POL)

17 July 2025
20:30

Boxscore

Lithuania	85–67	Slovenia
Scoring by quarter: 27–17, 23–24, 15–18, 20–8
Pts: Bieliauskas 16; Rebs: four players 7 Asts: Laurencikas 6		Pts: Vide 28; Rebs: Vide 8 Asts: Vide, Pirs 2

Nea Alikarnassos Arena
Attendance: 124
Referees: Luis Castillo (ESP), Siniša Prpa (SRB), Alessandro Perciavalle (ITA)

=== 5th–8th place semifinals ===
19 July 2025
13:00

Boxscore

Israel	80–69	Spain
Scoring by quarter: 22–8, 19–13, 29–26, 10–22
Pts: Avneri 22; Rebs: Sela 15; Asts: Vitlem 4		Pts: Navarro 14; Rebs: Folgueiras 12; Asts: Fabrega 6

Nea Alikarnassos Arena
Attendance: 60
Referees: Ademir Zurapović (BIH), Roko Hordov (CRO), Rainis Värv (EST)

19 July 2025
15:30

Boxscore

Slovenia	60–82	Greece
Scoring by quarter: 18–18, 5–21, 26–24, 11–19
Pts: Dragan, Vide 10; Rebs: Vide 9 Asts: Vide 7		Pts: Samodurov 23; Rebs: Soulis 7 Asts: Avdalas 9

Nea Alikarnassos Arena
Attendance: 668
Referees: Gvidas Gedvilas (LTU), Alessandro Perciavalle (ITA), Janis Rozenbergs (LAT)

=== 7th place match ===
20 July 2025
18:00

Boxscore

Spain	75–77	Slovenia
Scoring by quarter: 16–20, 12–7, 23–26, 24–24
Pts: Folgueiras 28; Rebs: Folgueiras 17; Asts: Folgueiras 9		Pts: Vide 20; Rebs: Vide 11; Asts: Razdevsek 7

University of Crete Hall
Attendance: 69
Referees: Ilias Kounelles (CYP), Alessandro Perciavalle (ITA), Denys Povorozniuk (UKR)

=== 5th place match ===
20 July 2025
13:00

Boxscore

Israel	82–92	Greece
Scoring by quarter: 21–21, 19–28, 22–23, 20–20
Pts: Michaeli 22; Rebs: Michaeli 10; Asts: Vitlem 4		Pts: Samodurov 25; Rebs: Avdalas 10; Asts: Avdalas 14

Nea Alikarnassos Arena
Attendance: 380
Referees: Jan Baloun (CZE), Blaz Zupancic (SLO), Rainis Värv (EST)

=== Championship semifinals ===
19 July 2025
18:00

Boxscore

Italy	85–78	Serbia
Scoring by quarter: 27–18, 14–17, 24–13, 20–30
Pts: Ferrari 21; Rebs: Atamah 8 Asts: Torresani, Trucchetti 5		Pts: Savanović 25; Rebs: Mikić 10; Asts: Ristić 7

Nea Alikarnassos Arena
Attendance: 420
Referees: Luis Castillo (ESP), Zdenko Tomasovic (SVK), Ilias Kounelles (CYP)

19 July 2025
20:30

Boxscore

Lithuania	81–71	France
Scoring by quarter: 24–30, 16–12, 23–12, 18–17
Pts: Juzenas 21; Rebs: Raupelis 7 Asts: Stuknys 5		Pts: Domon 15; Rebs: Majstorovic 6 Asts: Wibaut 4

Nea Alikarnassos Arena
Attendance: 395
Referees: Julio Anaya (PAN), Blaz Zupancic (SLO), Alberto Sanchez (ESP)

=== Third place match ===
20 July 2025
18:00

Boxscore

Serbia	62–73	France
Scoring by quarter: 19–17, 11–20, 11–16, 21–20
Pts: Nikolić, Gačić 16; Rebs: Mikić 7 Asts: Avramović 4		Pts: Majstorović 15; Rebs: Majstorovic, Domon 7 Asts: L'Etang, Domon 4

Nea Alikarnassos Arena
Attendance: 350
Referees: Gvidas Gedvilas (LTU), Julio Anaya (PAN), Mehmet Sahin (TUR)

=== Final ===
20 July 2025
20:30

Boxscore

Italy	83–66	Lithuania
Scoring by quarter: 23–17, 19–9, 18–22, 23–18
Pts: Ferrari 26; Rebs: Assui, Osasuyi 9 Asts: Trucchetti 4		Pts: Bieliauskas 17; Rebs: Bieliauskas 12; Asts: Stuknys 9

Nea Alikarnassos Arena
Attendance: 721
Referees: Luis Castillo (ESP), Nicolas Maestre (FRA), Lukasz Jankowski (POL)

== Final standings ==
Rank	Team	Record
1st place, gold medalist(s)	Italy	6–1
2nd place, silver medalist(s)	Lithuania	4–3
3rd place, bronze medalist(s)	France	5–2
4	Serbia	5–2
5	Greece	6–1
6	Israel	5–2
7	Slovenia	2–5
8	Spain	2–5
9	Czech Republic	5–2
10	Poland	4–3
11	Romania	2–5
12	Belgium	2–5
13	Germany	5–2
14	Iceland	2–5
15	Finland	1–6
16	Ukraine	0–7

Relegated to the 2026 FIBA U20 EuroBasket Division B

== Awards ==
The awards were announced on 20 July 2025.

Award	Player
All-Tournament Team	(Italy) Francesco Ferrari
All-Tournament Team	(Lithuania) Mantas Juzėnas
All-Tournament Team	(Serbia) Pavle Nikolić
All-Tournament Team	(Greece) Alexandros Samodurov
All-Tournament Team	(France) Roman Domon
Most Valuable Player	(Italy) Francesco Ferrari
