= Christian Anderson Jr. =

American basketball player (born 2006)

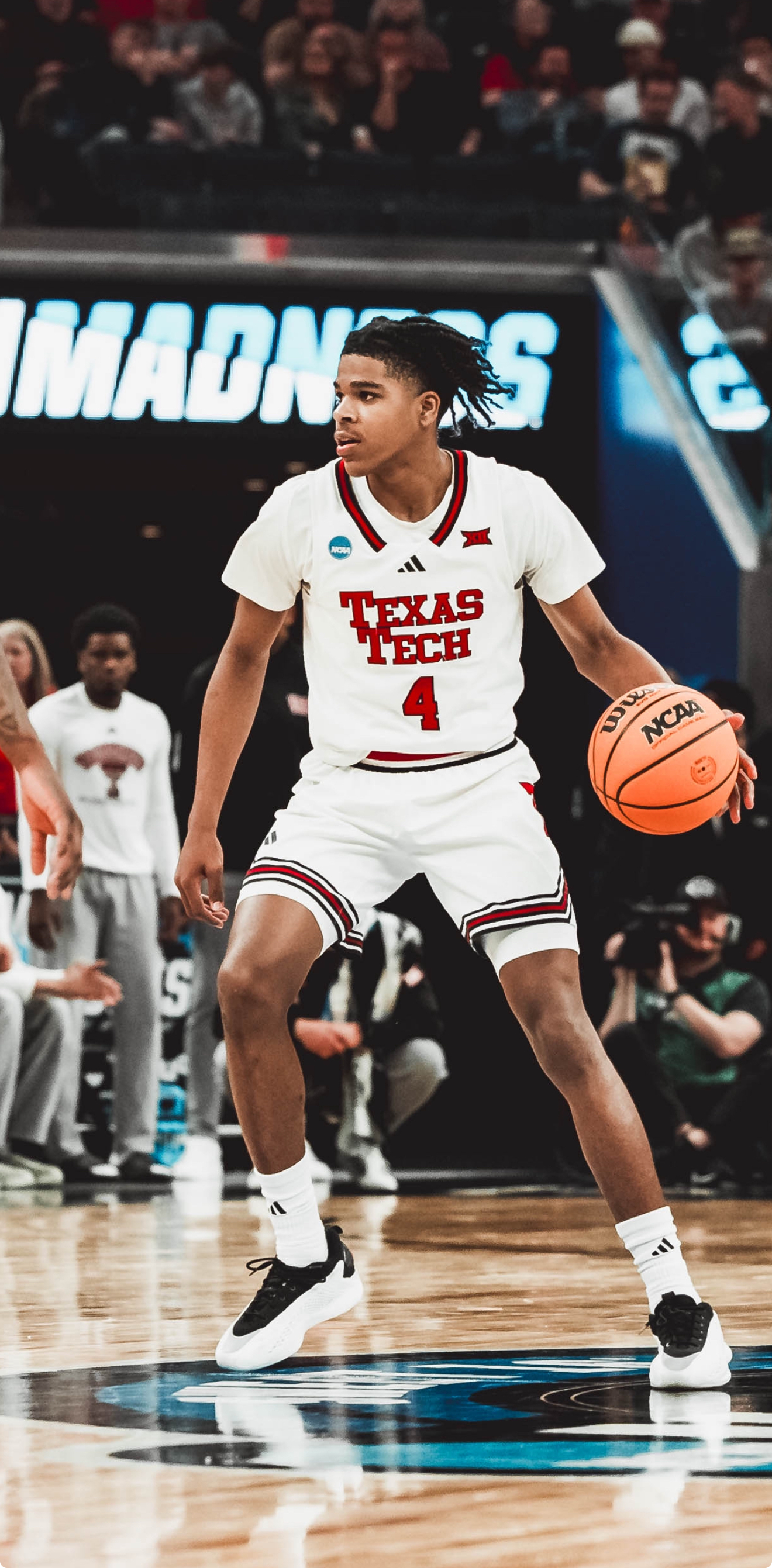
- Anderson with Texas Tech in 2025

No. 5 – Charlotte Hornets
- Position: Point guard
- League: NBA

Personal information
- Born: April 2, 2006 (age 20) Atlanta, Georgia, U.S.
- Listed height: 6 ft 1 in (1.85 m)
- Listed weight: 165 lb (75 kg)

Career information
- High school: Lovett School (Atlanta, Georgia); Oak Hill Academy (Mouth of Wilson, Virginia)
- College: Texas Tech (2024–2026)
- NBA draft: 2026: 1st round, 18th overall pick
- Drafted by: Charlotte Hornets
- Playing career: 2026–present

Career history
- 2026–present: Charlotte Hornets
- 2026: →Greensboro Swarm

Career highlights
- Third-team All-American – AP, TSN, USBWA (2026); First-team All-Big 12 (2026); Big 12 Most Improved Player (2026); Big 12 All-Freshman Team (2025); FIBA U16 EuroBasket Division B MVP (2022)
- Stats at NBA.com
- Stats at Basketball Reference
Medals
Men's basketball
Representing Germany
FIBA U19 World Cup
Silver medal – second place	2025 Switzerland	Team
FIBA U18 EuroBasket
Gold medal – first place	2024 Finland	Team
Bronze medal – third place	2023 Serbia	Team
FIBA U16 EuroBasket
Gold medal – first place	2022 Bulgaria	Team
European Youth Olympic Festival
Bronze medal – third place	2022 Slovakia	Team

Christian Anderson Jr. (born April 2, 2006) is a German-American basketball player for the Charlotte Hornets of the National Basketball Association (NBA). He played college basketball for the Texas Tech Red Raiders.

== High school career ==
During his high school career, Anderson attended both Lovett School in Atlanta and Oak Hill Academy in Mouth of Wilson, Virginia. As a senior, in a matchup versus Montverde Academy and Cooper Flagg, Anderson recorded 20 points, six rebounds, and two assists.

=== Recruiting ===
Rated as a four-star recruit, Anderson initially made a verbal commitment to play college basketball at the University of Michigan. He then committed to Michigan in October 2021, before the start of his sophomore season. However after being committed to the Wolverines for almost three years, Anderson de-committed after head coach Juwan Howard was fired. He ultimately committed to play for the Texas Tech Red Raiders.

== College career ==
On February 22, 2025, Anderson made his first career start, where he notched a career-high 21 points, while adding four rebounds, and four assists in a win over West Virginia. On March 14, he got the start where he scored 19 points in the semifinals of the 2025 Big 12 men's basketball tournament versus Arizona. For his performance during the 2024-25 season, he was named to the Big 12 Conference all-freshman team. Following the season, Anderson declared for the 2026 NBA draft on May 26, 2026.

== Professional career ==
On June 23, 2026, Anderson was selected with the 18th overall pick by the Charlotte Hornets in 2026 NBA Draft.

== National team career ==
Anderson represented the Germany U16 national team at the 2022 European Youth Summer Olympic Festival in Slovakia, leading his team in scoring and winning a bronze medal. Later that summer, he helped the team win the gold medal at the 2022 FIBA U16 European Championship Division B in Bulgaria. Anderson averaged 16.5 points, 2.8 assists, and 2.1 rebounds per game on 57.1 percent shooting, earning tournament MVP honors.

Anderson helped the Germany U18 national team win the bronze medal at the 2023 FIBA U18 European Championship in Serbia after averaging 14 points per game. The next year, he helped Germany to a gold-medal finish at the 2024 FIBA U18 EuroBasket in Finland – their first-ever gold medal at the event. Anderson averaged 20.3 points, five assists, and 2.3 rebounds per game, earning all-tournament honors. In the championship game, he recorded 31 points, five assists, and four rebounds in a 93–83 win over defending champions Serbia.

In July 2025, Anderson helped lead the Germany U19 national team to a silver medal finish at the 2025 FIBA U19 World Cup. He averaged 17.3 points, 4.9 rebounds, and 6.6 assists during the competition, while also earning a spot on the tournament's All-Star Five. Later in the month, Anderson was called up to the senior Germany national team for the first time. He was named to the preliminary roster for the EuroBasket 2025.

== Personal life ==
Anderson's father, Christian Anderson Sr., was a professional basketball player in Germany. His brother, Lucai Anderson, is committed to play college basketball for the Michigan Wolverines in 2027.
