= Nojus Indrušaitis =

Lithuanian basketball player (born 2006)

No. 25 – California Golden Bears
- Position: Shooting guard
- Conference: Atlantic Coast Conference

Personal information
- Born: April 25, 2006 (age 20) Chicago, Illinois, U.S.
- Listed height: 6 ft 5 in (1.96 m)
- Listed weight: 205 lb (93 kg)

Career information
- High school: Brewster Academy (Wolfeboro, New Hampshire)
- College: Iowa State (2024–2025); Pittsburgh (2025–2026); California (2026–present)

Career highlights
- New Hampshire Gatorade Player of the Year (2024)
Medals
Men's basketball
Representing Lithuania
FIBA U16 EuroBasket
Gold medal – first place	2022 North Macedonia	Team

Nojus Indrušaitis (born April 25, 2006) is a Lithuanian-American college basketball player for the California Golden Bears of the Atlantic Coast Conference (ACC). He previously played for the Iowa State Cyclones and Pittsburgh Panthers.

== Personal life ==
Indrušaitis was born in Chicago, Illinois, United States in a family of Lithuanian Americans. Prior to the COVID-19 pandemic, he visited Lithuania almost annually in summers. He is fluent in English and Lithuanian languages.

Indrušaitis attended Brewster Academy in Wolfeboro, New Hampshire. While playing for the Brewster Academy he averaged 14.5 points, 4.6 rebounds per game, and was named the 2024 New Hampshire Gatorade Player of the Year. Indrušaitis became the second Lithuanian American to receive this title, after eventual NBA player Matas Buzelis who received it in 2022.

== US college career ==
In 2024, Indrušaitis had signed a National Letter of Intent with the Iowa State University. While representing the Iowa State Cyclones men's basketball team he received just 5.8 minutes of playing time in 15 games and averaged 2.1 points per game. After the season he entered the NCAA transfer portal, seeking for a bigger role elsewhere.

In 2025, Indrušaitis had signed a National Letter of Intent with the University of Pittsburgh after being actively recruited by its coaches.

== National team career ==
Indrušaitis played for the Lithuania men's national under-16 team in the 2022 FIBA U16 European Championship and led the Lithuania's national team to gold medals. After averaging 15.1 points, 4.6 rebounds, 1.4 assists per game, he was included into the tournament's All-Star Five.

He also represented the Lithuania men's national under-18 team in the 2023 FIBA U18 European Championship (averaged 13.4 points, 3.1 rebounds, and 2.1 assists) and 2024 FIBA U18 EuroBasket (averaged 20.1 points, 4.1 rebounds, and 3 assists), however the Lithuania's national teams were eliminated in the Round of 16 and Quarterfinal respectively.
