= Kasparas Jakučionis =

Lithuanian basketball player (born 2006)

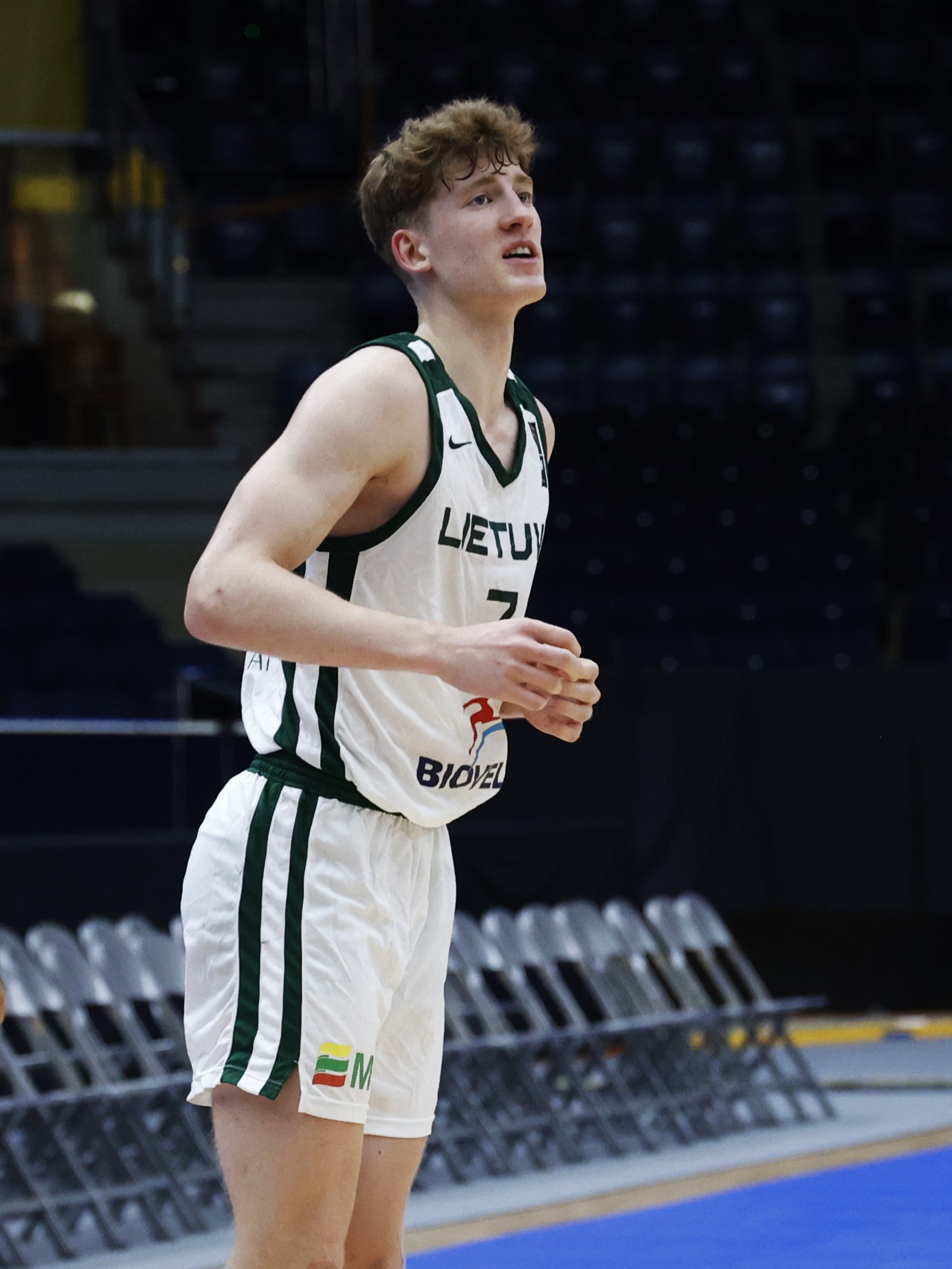
- Jakučionis at the 2024 U18 EuroBasket

No. 25 – Milwaukee Bucks
- Position: Point guard / shooting guard
- League: NBA

Personal information
- Born: 29 May 2006 (age 20) Vilnius, Lithuania
- Listed height: 6 ft 5 in (1.96 m)
- Listed weight: 200 lb (91 kg)

Career information
- College: Illinois (2024–2025)
- NBA draft: 2025: 1st round, 20th overall pick
- Drafted by: Miami Heat
- Playing career: 2020–present

Career history
- 2020–2021: Perlas Vilnius
- 2022–2024: FC Barcelona
- 2022–2024: →FC Barcelona B
- 2025–2026: Miami Heat
- 2025: →Sioux Falls Skyforce
- 2026–present: Milwaukee Bucks

Career highlights
- Second-team All-Big Ten (2025); Big Ten All-Freshman Team (2025); Nike Hoop Summit (2024)
- Stats at NBA.com
- Stats at Basketball Reference
Medals
Men's basketball
Representing Lithuania
FIBA U16 EuroBasket
Gold medal – first place	2022 North Macedonia	Team

Kasparas Jakučionis (born 29 May 2006) is a Lithuanian professional basketball player for the Milwaukee Bucks of the National Basketball Association (NBA). He played college basketball for the Illinois Fighting Illini.

== Early life and youth career ==
Jakučionis was born in Vilnius and started playing basketball in the youth ranks of Perlas Vilnius, a team affiliated with Rytas Vilnius. In 2021, Jakučionis joined the youth ranks of FC Barcelona. In the 2022–23 season, Jakučionis alternated between Barcelona's junior team and the club's reserve team in Liga EBA. Jakučionis would be selected to the 2023–24 under-18 Euroleague All-Tournament Team. He would also make his professional debut for the FC Barcelona first team in April 2023, in a Liga ACB game against Coviran Granada. Upon his debut, he became the third youngest player to play for FC Barcelona in Liga ACB. On 12 January 2024, Jakučionis debuted in the EuroLeague in a game against Žalgiris Kaunas and scored two points.

=== Recruiting ===
On 28 May 2024, Jakučionis committed to play college basketball for Illinois under Brad Underwood. FC Barcelona retained the player's rights upon a possible return to Europe.

College recruiting
Name	Hometown	School	Height	Weight	Commit date
Kasparas Jakučionis; G	Vilnius, Lithuania	FC Barcelona Bàsquet	6 ft 6 in (1.98 m)	200 lb (91 kg)	May 28, 2024
Kasparas Jakučionis; G	Recruit ratings: 247Sports: On3:				
Overall recruit ranking: Rivals: 11 247Sports: 10 On3: 20
Note: In many cases, Scout, Rivals, 247Sports, On3, and ESPN may conflict in their listings of height and weight.; In these cases, the average was taken. ESPN grades are on a 100-point scale.; Sources: "2024 Illinois Commits". Rivals.; "ESPN- Illinois Fighting Illini Men's Basketball Recruiting". ESPN.; "2024 Team Ranking". Rivals.; "Kasparas Jakučionis". 247Sports.; "Kasparas Jakučionis". On3.

== College career ==
Jakučionis made his college basketball debut on 4 November 2024, recording 11 points, seven assists and five rebounds in 26 minutes in a win over Eastern Illinois, setting a record for the most assists in a season-opener by a freshman. Four days later, in his second game, he set a new record with 13 assists against SIU Edwardsville, while also logging his first collegiate double-double with 12 points. On December 16, Jakučionis earned Big Ten Freshman of the Week honors (alongside Dylan Harper) after scoring at least 20 points in five consecutive games and leading the team in scoring. On 6 January 2025, he was named Big Ten Freshman of the Week for the second time (alongside Ace Bailey and Braden Smith) after leading the Fighting Illini to a 3–0 week, averaging a team-best 16 points per game.

At the conclusion of his freshman season, Jakučionis was named to the Big Ten All-Freshman Team and earned second-team All-Big Ten honors. On 14 April, he declared for the 2025 NBA draft, foregoing his remaining college eligibility.

== Professional career ==
=== Miami Heat (2025–2026) ===
On 25 June 2025, Jakučionis was selected by the Miami Heat with the 20th overall pick in the 2025 NBA draft. On 1 July, the Heat signed Jakučionis to a reported four-year, $17.7 million contract. He represented the Heat in the 2025 NBA Summer League.

On 15 November, the Heat assigned Jakučionis to its NBA G League affiliate team, the Sioux Falls Skyforce, for game action after recovering from injuries. On 16 November, Jakučionis debuted in the NBA G League by scoring 12 points, grabbing seven rebounds and dishing out two assists.

On 1 December, Jakučionis made his NBA debut in a 140–123 win against the Los Angeles Clippers. On 19 December, Jakučionis for the first time was a part of the Heat starting five due to injuries of Davion Mitchell and Tyler Herro, and per 35 minutes he scored 17 points, grabbed six rebounds, dished out four assists, while the Heat won the game 129–116 against the Boston Celtics. On 8 February 2026, Jakučionis scored a career-high 22 points and also had three rebounds, six assists, two steals and one block in a 132–101 victory over the Washington Wizards. The next day, on 9 February, Jakučionis demonstrated shooting consistency by once again making six three-point field goals (out of ten) and scored 20 points, along with three rebounds and one assist; however, this time the Heat lost the game 115–111 to the Utah Jazz. On 11 March 2026, Jakučionis began in a starting five and played 30 minutes in a historic game between the Heat and the Washington Wizards during which his teammate Bam Adebayo scored 83 points, the second-highest NBA single-game scoring performance, and Jakučionis contributed to this achievement with his assists to Adebayo. His debut season in the NBA ended when the Heat in the 2026 NBA play-in tournament lost the first game 127–126 after overtime to the Charlotte Hornets and failed to qualify for the 2026 NBA playoffs.

=== Milwaukee Bucks (2026–present) ===
On 6 July 2026, Jakučionis, alongside Tyler Herro, Kel'el Ware, Jaime Jaquez Jr., the rights to Nate Ament and four future draft picks, was traded to the Milwaukee Bucks in exchange for Giannis Antetokounmpo and Bobby Portis. On 21 October, Jakučionis made his Bucks debut, recording 15 points, three rebounds and three assists in a 128–116 loss to the Washington Wizards. On October 25th, he was fined $2,000 by the NBA for flopping in a game against the Chicago Bulls. On 15 November, Jakučionis scored his NBA career-high 25 points, along with five rebounds and five assists, however the Bucks lost 113–106 to the Atlanta Hawks.

== National team ==
Jakučionis was one of the leaders of the Lithuania men's national under-16 basketball team in the 2022 FIBA U16 European Championship where the Lithuanians finished the tournament as undefeated (7–0) and won gold medal. He also represented the Lithuania men's national under-18 basketball team in the 2023 FIBA U18 European Championship (where Lithuania finished 11th) and the 2024 FIBA U18 EuroBasket (where Lithuania finished 6th).

On July 2, 2026, Jakučionis debuted in an official game with the Lithuania men's national basketball team during the 2027 FIBA Basketball World Cup qualification and helped it to reach a 105–85 victory versus the Great Britain men's national basketball team.

== Personal life ==
Jakučionis is fluent in Lithuanian, English and Spanish languages. According to Jakučionis, his childhood hero in the NBA was LeBron James and his play is most influenced by Šarūnas Jasikevičius.

== Career statistics ==
Legend
GP	Games played	GS	Games started	MPG	Minutes per game
FG%	Field-goal percentage	3P%	3-point field-goal percentage	FT%	Free-throw percentage
RPG	Rebounds per game	APG	Assists per game	SPG	Steals per game
BPG	Blocks per game	PPG	Points per game	PIR	Performance index rating
**Bold**	Career high

=== NBA ===
Year	Team	GP	GS	MPG	FG%	3P%	FT%	RPG	APG	SPG	BPG	PPG
2025–26	Miami	53	12	17.8	.429	.423	.879	2.6	2.6	.6	.1	6.2
Career		53	12	17.8	.429	.423	.879	2.6	2.6	.6	.1	6.2

=== College ===
Year	Team	GP	GS	MPG	FG%	3P%	FT%	RPG	APG	SPG	BPG	PPG
2024–25	Illinois	33	33	31.8	.440	.318	.845	5.7	4.7	.9	.3	15.0

=== EuroLeague ===
Year	Team	GP	GS	MPG	FG%	3P%	FT%	RPG	APG	SPG	BPG	PPG	PIR
2023–24	Barcelona	1	0	1.0	1.000	—	—	1.0	—	—	—	2.0	1.0
Career		1	0	1.0	1.000	—	—	1.0	—	—	—	2.0	1.0

=== Domestic leagues ===
Year	Team	League	GP	MPG	FG%	3P%	FT%	RPG	APG	SPG	BPG	PPG
2020–21	Perlas Energija	NKL	1	12.6	.333	—	—	—	—	1.0	—	2.0
2022–23	FC Barcelona	ACB	1	0.5	1.000	1.000	—	—	—	—	—	3.0
2023–24	FC Barcelona	ACB	3	9.8	.667	.625	—	1.3	1.7	.3	—	7.0
