= Francesco Ferrari (basketball) =

Italian basketball player (born 2005)

- Ferrari with Virtus Bologna in 2026

No. 24 – Virtus Bologna
- Position: Power forward / small forward
- League: LBA; EuroLeague

Personal information
- Born: August 18, 2005 (age 21) Novara, Italy
- Listed height: 2.04 m (6 ft 8 in)
- Listed weight: 90 kg (198 lb)

Career information
- Playing career: 2021–present

Career history
- 2021–2024: CB Borgomanero
- 2022–2023: →SC Borgomanero
- 2023–2024: →Olimpia Milano
- 2024–2025: United Eagles Cividale
- 2026–present: Virtus Bologna

Career highlights
- FIBA U20 EuroBasket MVP (2025)
Medals
Men's basketball
Representing Italy
FIBA U20 EuroBasket
Gold medal – first place	2025 Greece	Team

Francesco Ferrari (born August 18, 2005) is an Italian professional basketball player for Virtus Bologna of the Lega Basket Serie A (LBA) and the EuroLeague. He also represents the Italian national team.

== Professional career ==
=== CB Borgomanero (2021–2024) ===
Ferrari developed in the youth sector of CB Borgomanero, the club where his father Federico served as general manager. In the 2021–2022 season he made his senior debut with the first team in Serie B Interregionale, the fourth tier of Italian basketball. The following year he split his time between the same league with College Borgomanero and Serie C Silver with SC Borgomanero, the club's satellite team. During the 2023–2024 season, he averaged 18.6 points, 7.8 rebounds and 1.6 assists per game, once again in Serie B Interregionale. At the same time, he continued to play at youth level.

==== Loan to Olimpia Milano (2023–2024) ====
In February 2024 he competed in and won the LBA Next Gen Cup while on loan at Olimpia Milano, earning Finals MVP honors after posting 26 points, 13 rebounds and a performance index rating of 36.

=== UEB Cividale (2024–2025) ===
Starting from the 2024–2025 season, he officially became a player for United Eagles Basketball Cividale, competing in Serie A2. In his first year with the team coached by Stefano Pillastrini, the nineteen-year-old Ferrari averaged 8.7 points and 5.6 rebounds per game, and was named Italian MVP of the league for the month of January. On 11 June 2025, he renewed his contract with the Friulian club for a further two seasons. On 10 December 2025, in a rescheduled home game of the 14th round won against Urania Milano, the twenty-year-old Ferrari delivered a 36-point performance, shooting 9/12 from two-point range, a perfect 5/5 from three, and 3/5 from the free-throw line. It was the highest scoring game by a 20-year-old Italian player in one of the two top national divisions since Carlton Myers's 1991 performance.

=== Virtus Bologna (2026–present) ===
On 3 January 2026, Ferrari was signed by Virtus Bologna, the reigning Italian championship, on a contract running through 2028.

== National team career ==
Ferrari played for the Italy men's national under-18 basketball team during the 2023 FIBA U18 European Championship (averaged 16.9 points, 9.3 rebounds, 1.3 assists) and 2024 FIBA U20 EuroBasket (8.9 points, 4.4 rebounds, 1.1 assists), his represented teams were eliminated both times in the Round of 16.

In 2025, Ferrari played for the Italian men's national under-20 basketball team in the 2025 FIBA U20 EuroBasket and by averaging 15.9 points, 5.4 rebounds, 1.6 assists per game led his team to gold medals, defeating the Lithuanian national team in the final 83–66. Ferrari was named the MVP of the 2025 FIBA U20 EuroBasket and included into the tournament's All-Star Five.

== Personal life ==
Ferrari's basketball idol is Italian basketball player Danilo Gallinari.
