= Rasmus Persson (radio personality) =

Rasmus Oskar Persson
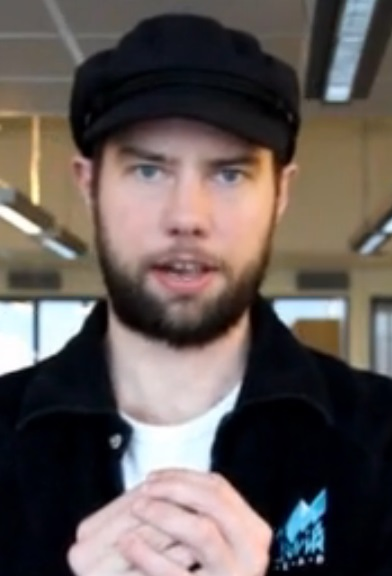
- Born: September 21, 1983 (age 42)
- Other names: "Östanås", "Gandalf Cool"
- Occupation: Radio Personality
- Known for: Host for Radio Programs, Christer, Christer och Morgan Rapporterar, Alphabet, and Satsommar

Rasmus Oskar Persson, born 21 September 1983 in Östanås, Värmland, is a Swedish radio show personality and researcher on the program Christer and Morgan Rapporterar on Swedish National Radio Station P3.

Persson was previously the host and researcher for the precursor radio program, Christer, also on P3. He has also created and hosted his own radio programs with Hanna Andersson, entitled Alphabet and Satsommar (English: Satan's Summer) also on P3.

On February 12, 2015, during a regular portion of the show 'Nyhet eller Bullshit' (English: News or Bullshit), Rasmus read that his home municipality of Munkfors was hosting a 'Day of Happiness' to combat the negative impression of the area. Though it wasn't true, and thus fell under the 'Bullshit' category, members of the Munkfors Municipality Board contacted P3 and Rasmus to ask if they could host the first annual Day of Happiness in Munkfors (Swedish: Glädjens dag i Munkfors). Owing to the humor of April Fools' Day, Munkfors proposed having the day on April 1 and will do so with Rasmus making a presentation to his home municipality.
