= Alexandros Samodurov =

Greek basketball player (born 2005)

Alexandros Samodurov Αλέξανδρος Σαμοντούροβ
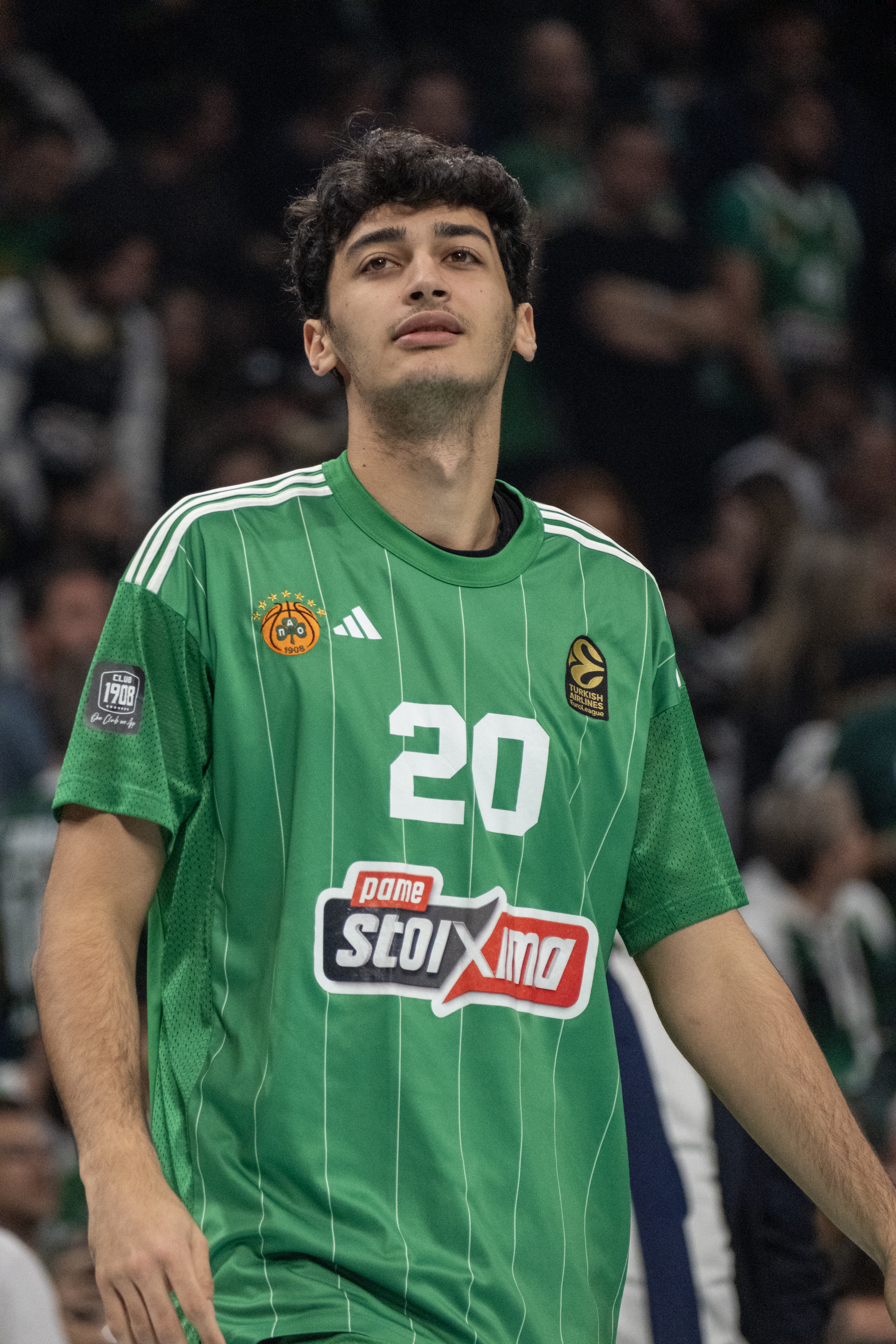
- Samodurov with Panathinaikos in 2025

No. 20 – North Carolina Tar Heels
- Position: Power forward
- League: Atlantic Coast Conference

Personal information
- Born: April 20, 2005 (age 21) Evosmos, Greece
- Listed height: 6 ft 11 in (2.11 m)
- Listed weight: 225 lb (102 kg)

Career information
- College: North Carolina (2026–present)
- Playing career: 2022–present

Career history
- 2022–2026: Panathinaikos
- 2023–2024: →Panerythraikos

Career highlights
- EuroLeague champion (2024); Greek League champion (2024); 2x Greek Cup winner (2025, 2026)
Medals
Men's basketball
Representing Greece
EuroBasket
Bronze medal – third place	2025 Cyprus–Finland–Poland–Latvia
European U-20 Championship
Bronze medal – third place	2024 Poland	Under-20

Alexandros Samodurov (Greek: Αλέξανδρος Σαμοντούροβ; born April 20, 2005) is a Greek college basketball player for North Carolina Tar Heels of the Atlantic Coast Conference (ACC). He is a 2.10 m (6 ft 11 in) tall power forward.

== Early years ==
Samodurov was born and raised in Evosmos, a suburb of Thessaloniki, Greece, to Georgian parents. He started playing basketball as a kid, joining Nikos Chatzivrettas's 10 Academy at the age of 10. His first steps on the next level were made at the 2019 Greek U16 Championship, where he averaged 4.3 points, 3 rebounds and 1 steal in 12 minutes, despite playing two years up, at age 14.

His huge progress paid off in the 2021–22 season, where Samodurov's star shone in the Rising Stars tournament, organized by the Hellenic Basketball Federation, hosting U18 teams. He was named the MVP of the tournament and led 10 Academy to the title, with his numbers being over the top, averaging 25.9 points (75.7% free throws, 66.7% two-pointers and 25.8% three-pointers), 13.3 rebounds, 2.1 assists and 2 blocks, in 35 minutes.

On March 22, 2022, Samodurov signed a six-year contract with Panathinaikos of the Greek Basket League and the EuroLeague. He stayed with 10 Academy for the remainder of the 2021–2022 season. On June 23, 2022, 10 Academy retired Samodurov's jersey.

On October 5, 2023, Samodurov signed a two-way contract with 2nd division club Panerythraikos, while remaining on the active roster of Panathinaikos.

== College career ==
On May 28, 2026, following the announcement of his withdrawal from the 2026 NBA draft, Samodurov announced that he is committed to play college basketball for the North Carolina Tar Heels in the 2026–27 season.

== National team career ==
On June 20, 2022, Samodurov was called up in the Greek U18 national team for the upcoming 2022 FIBA U18 European Championship. One day later, he was also called up by coach Dimitrios Itoudis in the Greek men's national team's selection for the 2023 FIBA Basketball World Cup qualification game against Great Britain.

In 2025, Samodurov represented the Greece men's national under-20 basketball team during the 2025 FIBA U20 EuroBasket and although his team finished 5th he was included into the tournament's All-Star Five.

== Career statistics ==
Legend
GP	Games played	GS	Games started	MPG	Minutes per game
FG%	Field-goal percentage	3P%	3-point field-goal percentage	FT%	Free-throw percentage
RPG	Rebounds per game	APG	Assists per game	SPG	Steals per game
BPG	Blocks per game	PPG	Points per game	PIR	Performance index rating
**Bold**	Career high

=== EuroLeague ===
†	Denotes seasons in which Samodurov won the EuroLeague

Year	Team	GP	GS	MPG	FG%	3P%	FT%	RPG	APG	SPG	BPG	PPG	PIR
2022–23	Panathinaikos	2	0	1.0	.667	—	—	—	—	—	—	2.0	0.5
2023–24†	Panathinaikos	1	0	1.0	.500	**1.000**	—	—	**1.0**	—	—	**3.0**	**3.0**
2024–25	Panathinaikos	6	0	4.1	**.750**	.666	**.750**	**1.2**	.2	—	**.5**	1.8	2.7
2025–26	Panathinaikos	**13**	0	**6.2**	.608	.333	.666	.7	.3	**.1**	**.5**	2.6	2.8
Career		22	0	4.9	.625	.438	.714	.7	.3	.0	.4	2.4	2.5

=== Domestic leagues ===
Year	Team	League	GP	MPG	FG%	3P%	FT%	RPG	APG	SPG	BPG	PPG
2022–23	(Greece) Panathinaikos	GBL	7	6.5	.714	.500	.750	1.6	.1	.3	.1	2.0
2023–24	(Greece) Panerythraikos	HEBA A2	27	15.0	.474	.348	.621	3.1	.6	.5	.8	4.7
2023–24	(Greece) Panathinaikos	GBL	8	14.3	.563	.200	1.000	2.5	.6	.2	.6	2.6

== Personal life ==
Samodurov has two brothers. His younger brother, born in 2008, Angelos, also plays basketball.
