= Ben Saraf =

South African-Israeli basketball player (born 2006)

Ben Saraf בן שרף
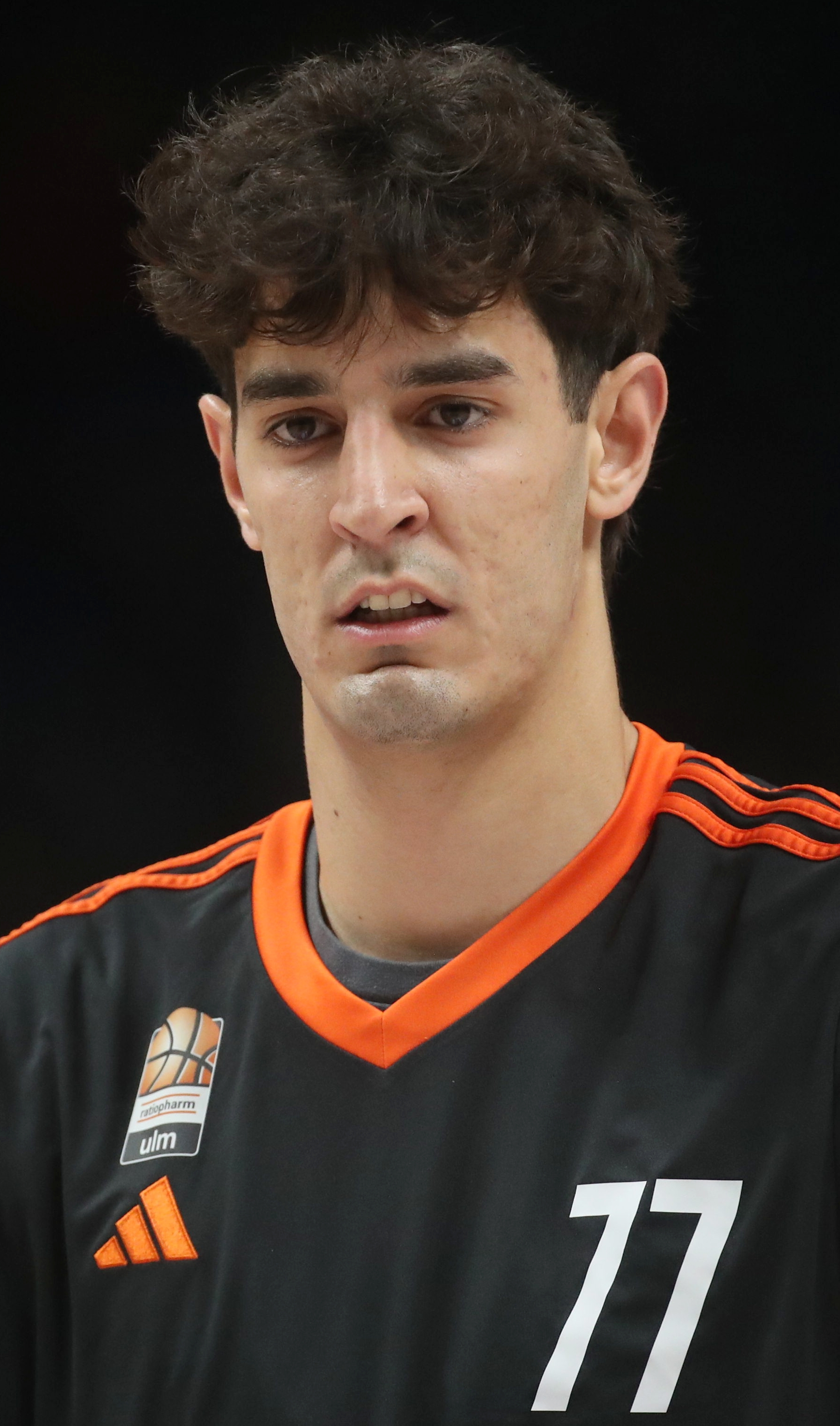
- Saraf with Ratiopharm Ulm in 2025

No. 77 – Brooklyn Nets
- Position: Point guard / shooting guard
- League: NBA

Personal information
- Born: 14 April 2006 (age 20) Johannesburg, South Africa
- Listed height: 6 ft 5 in (1.96 m)
- Listed weight: 212 lb (96 kg)

Career information
- NBA draft: 2025: 1st round, 26th overall pick
- Drafted by: Brooklyn Nets
- Playing career: 2022–present

Career history
- 2022–2023: Elitzur Netanya
- 2023–2024: Ironi Kiryat Ata
- 2024–2025: Ratiopharm Ulm
- 2025–present: Brooklyn Nets
- 2025–2026: →Long Island Nets

Career highlights
- Israeli League Rising Star (2024); FIBA U18 EuroBasket MVP (2024)
- Stats at NBA.com
- Stats at Basketball Reference

Ben Avraham Saraf (Hebrew: בן שרף; born 14 April 2006) is a South African-Israeli professional basketball player for the Brooklyn Nets of the National Basketball Association (NBA). He previously played for Elitzur Netanya, Ironi Kiryat Ata, and Ratiopharm Ulm.

== Early life ==
Saraf is Jewish and was born to Israeli parents in South Africa, where his father worked in the diamond industry. The family returned to Israel when Saraf was three.

Saraf grew up in Moshav Gan Yoshiya in the Emek Hefer Regional Council in Israel. His father Yedid played one season for Bnei Herzliya Basket in the Israeli Basketball Premier League. His mother, Ella Amir Sharaf, grew up in Kibbutz Givat Haim and played basketball for the Israeli women's national team and for a number of years in Israel's second basketball division. He attended Ramot Yam Emek Hefer high school.

== Professional career ==
=== Elitzur Netanya (2022–2023) ===
Saraf began his professional career at 16 years old playing for Elitzur Netanya in the second division Israeli Basketball National League. He averaged 14 points, 3.3 rebounds, and three assists per game during the 2022–23 season. In April 2023, he was named the National League's Sixth Player of the Season and Rookie of the Year.

=== Ironi Kiryat Ata (2023–2024) ===
He signed with Ironi Kiryat Ata of the top division Israeli Basketball Premier League on 11 July 2023. After averaging 10.7 points, 3.2 rebounds, 3.7 assists, and one steal per game in 2023–24, Saraf was named the Israeli Basketball Premier League Rising Star.

=== Ratiopharm Ulm (2024–2025) ===
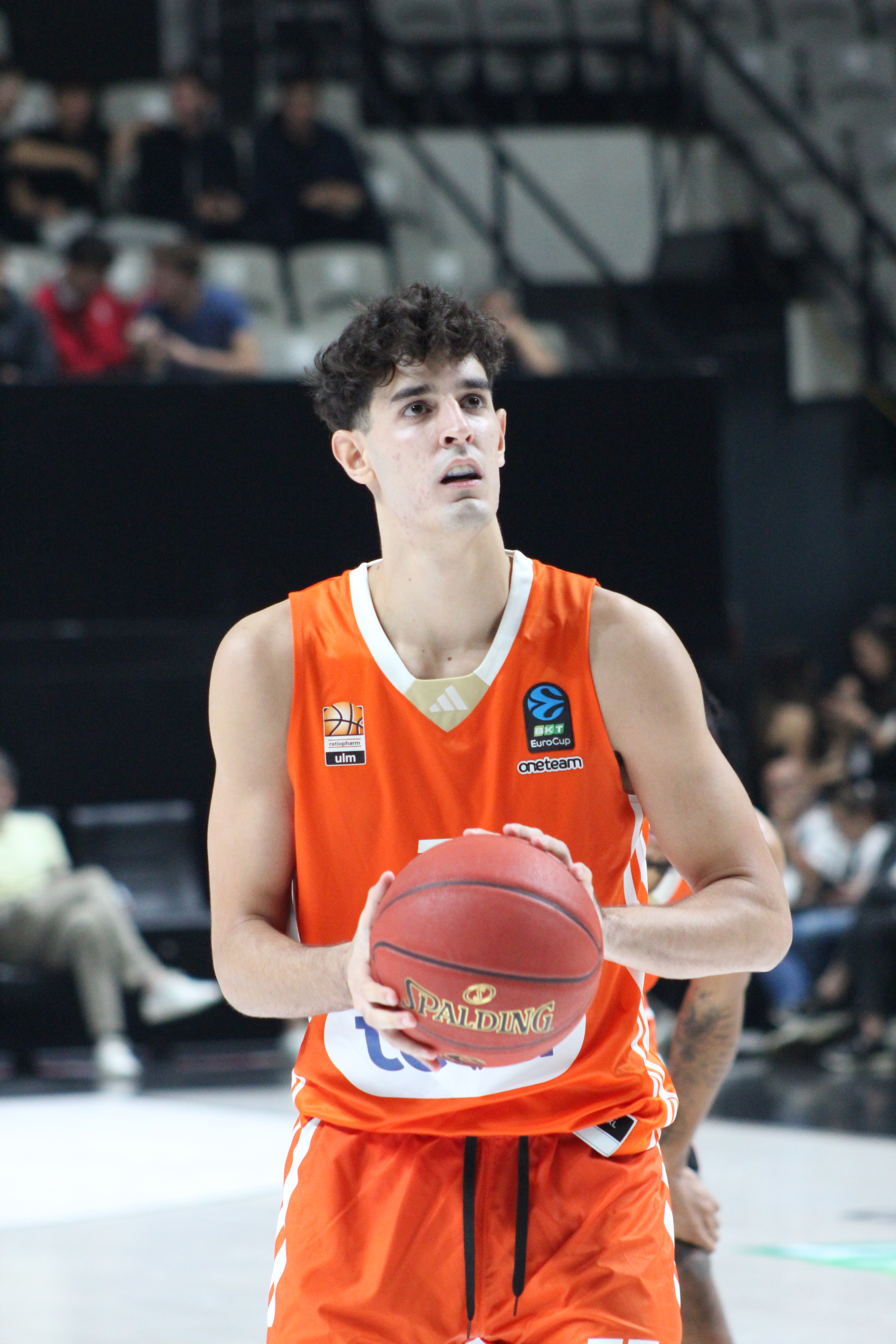
Saraf with Ratiopharm Ulm in 2024

Saraf signed with Ratiopharm Ulm of the Basketball Bundesliga (BBL) in Germany on 20 June 2024. At Ulm, he played for coach Ty Harrelson and had a major role on the team, which reached the Bundesliga finals. He averaged 12.8 points and 4.6 assists per game in 2024–25.

=== Brooklyn Nets (2025–present) ===
Saraf was selected by the Brooklyn Nets with the 26th pick in the 2025 NBA draft on 25 June 2025, side-by-side with American-Israeli Danny Wolf, who was selected with the 27th pick. This marked the first time that two Israeli players were picked by the same team in the NBA draft. Before then, three Israelis were drafted in the NBA draft and played in the NBA: Omri Casspi, T. J. Leaf, and Deni Avdija.

He received a guaranteed two-year contract, for $2.4 million in his rookie season and $2.52 million in his second season. On 15 December 2025, Saraf was assigned to the Nets' G League affiliate, the Long Island Nets.

On October 16, 2026, Saraf was assigned to the Long Island Nets of the NBA G League alongside Joshua Jefferson and Drake Powell.

== National team career ==
Saraf played for the Israel under-16 basketball team in the 2022 FIBA U16 European Championship. He led the tournament in scoring with 24.3 points per game and was named to the 2022 European U16 All-Tournament Team.

Saraf played for the Israel under-18 basketball team in the 2024 FIBA U18 EuroBasket Championship. He again led the tournament in scoring, this time with 28.1 points per game, led the tournament in steals with four per game, was named the tournament MVP, and was named to the 2024 European U18 All-Tournament Team, as Israel finished fourth.

== Career statistics ==
Legend
GP	Games played	GS	Games started	MPG	Minutes per game
FG%	Field goal percentage	3P%	3-point field goal percentage	FT%	Free throw percentage
RPG	Rebounds per game	APG	Assists per game	SPG	Steals per game
BPG	Blocks per game	PPG	Points per game	**Bold**	Career high

=== NBA ===
Year	Team	GP	GS	MPG	FG%	3P%	FT%	RPG	APG	SPG	BPG	PPG
2025–26	Brooklyn	44	11	20.8	.396	.211	.830	2.1	3.3	.9	.2	7.5
Career		44	11	20.8	.396	.211	.830	2.1	3.3	.9	.2	7.5

== See also ==
- List of Jewish basketball players
