= Noa Essengue =

French basketball player (born 2006)

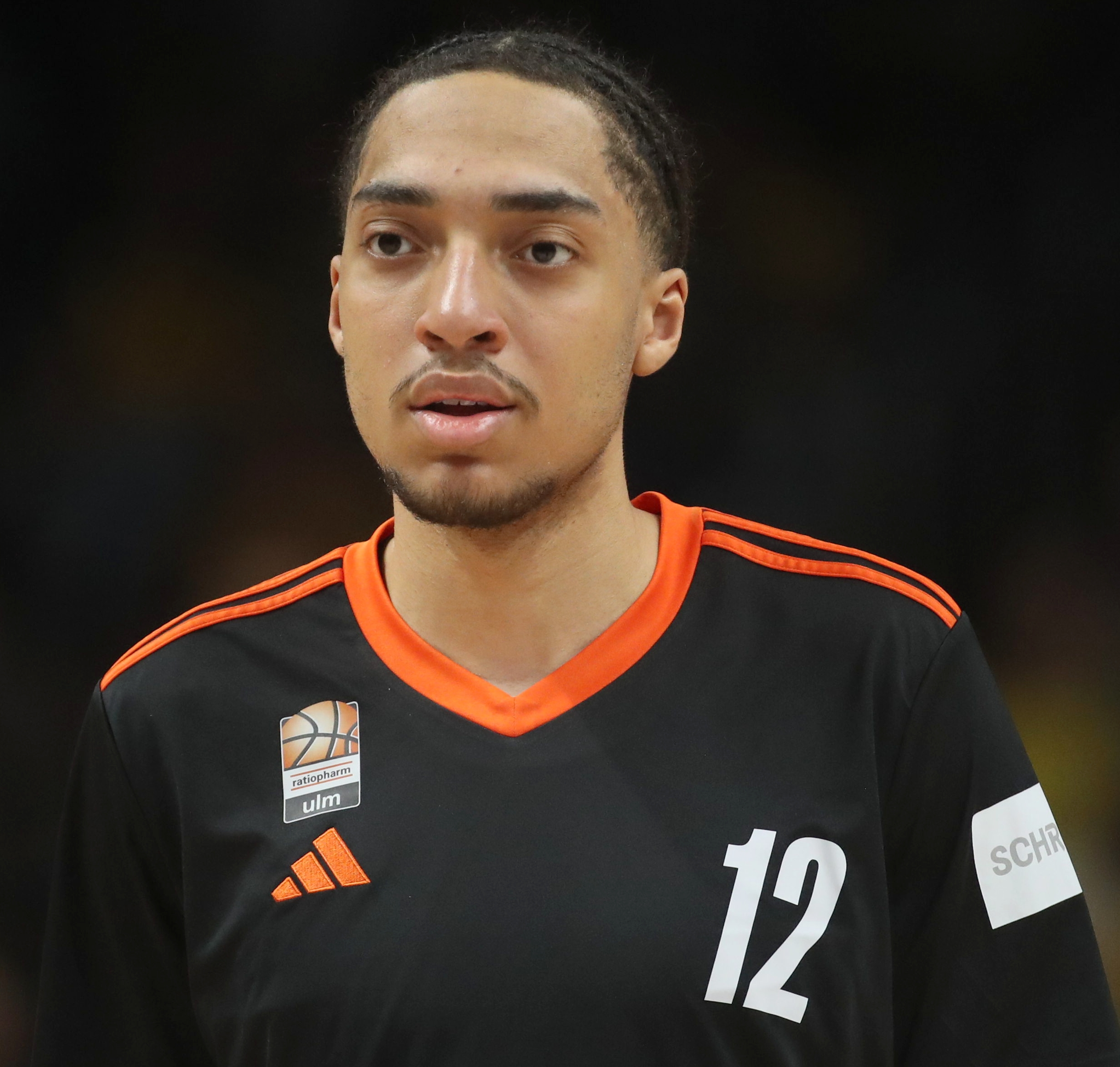
- Essengue with Ulm in 2025

No. 2 – Chicago Bulls
- Position: Power forward
- League: NBA

Personal information
- Born: 18 December 2006 (age 19) Orléans, Loiret, France
- Listed height: 6 ft 9 in (2.06 m)
- Listed weight: 194 lb (88 kg)

Career information
- NBA draft: 2025: 1st round, 12th overall pick
- Drafted by: Chicago Bulls
- Playing career: 2021–present

Career history
- 2021–2023: CFBB
- 2023–2025: Ratiopharm Ulm
- 2023–2024: →OrangeAcademy
- 2025–present: Chicago Bulls
- 2025: →Windy City Bulls
- Stats at NBA.com
- Stats at Basketball Reference
Medals
Men's basketball
Representing France
FIBA U16 European Championship
Bronze medal – third place	2022 North Macedonia	Team

Noa Essengue (born 18 December 2006; French pronunciation: [nɔɑ əsɛnɡe]) is a French professional basketball player for the Chicago Bulls of the National Basketball Association (NBA). He previously played for CFBB, Ratiopharm Ulm, and OrangeAcademy. Essengue was selected in the first round of the 2025 NBA draft by the Bulls with the 12th overall pick.

== Professional career ==
Essengue was born in Orléans and played for the youth teams of Orléans Loiret Basket as a child. He began his professional career playing for Centre Fédéral de Basket-ball, a team affiliated with INSEP, in Nationale Masculine 1 (NM1).

Essengue signed with Ratiopharm Ulm of the Basketball Bundesliga (BBL) on 21 July 2023. He spent most of his first season assigned to OrangeAcademy, Ulm's developmental team. In the 2024–25 season, playing for coach Ty Harrelson at Ulm, Essengue became a "key contributor" for the team, according to FIBA.

On 26 June 2025, Essengue was drafted by the Chicago Bulls with the 12th pick in the NBA draft. On December 3, Essengue was ruled out for the remainder of the season due to a shoulder injury that required surgery. He totaled just over six minutes in his rookie season, going 0-for-3 from the floor. In four games with the G-League Windy City Bulls, Essengue averaged 23 points, 8.5 rebounds in 30.8 minutes.

== National team career ==
Essengue was named to the France under-18 national team to compete in the 2024 FIBA U18 EuroBasket. He was named to the senior team for France's EuroBasket 2025 qualifier matches against Cyprus.

== Career statistics ==
Legend
GP	Games played	GS	Games started	MPG	Minutes per game
FG%	Field goal percentage	3P%	3-point field goal percentage	FT%	Free throw percentage
RPG	Rebounds per game	APG	Assists per game	SPG	Steals per game
BPG	Blocks per game	PPG	Points per game	**Bold**	Career high

=== NBA ===
Year	Team	GP	GS	MPG	FG%	3P%	FT%	RPG	APG	SPG	BPG	PPG
2025–26	Chicago	2	0	3.0	.000	.000	–	.0	.0	.5	.0	.0
Career		2	0	3.0	.000	.000	–	.0	.0	.5	.0	.0
