= Mantas Juzėnas =

Lithuanian basketball player

No. 0 – Saint Mary's Gaels
- Position: Shooting guard / small forward
- League: West Coast Conference

Personal information
- Born: November 16, 2006 (age 19) Kaunas, Lithuania
- Listed height: 6 ft 6 in (1.98 m)
- Listed weight: 205 lb (93 kg)

Career information
- College: Saint Mary's (2025–present)
- Playing career: 2022–present

Career history
- 2022–2023: BC Žalgiris-3
- 2023–2024: BC Žalgiris-2
- 2023–2024: →BC Žalgiris-3
- 2024–2025: BC Žalgiris
- 2024–2025: →BC Žalgiris-2
Medals
Men's basketball
Representing Lithuania
FIBA U16 EuroBasket
Gold medal – first place	2022 North Macedonia	Team
FIBA U20 EuroBasket
Silver medal – second place	2025 Greece	Team

Mantas Juzėnas (born November 16, 2006) is a Lithuanian basketball player for NCAA Division I Saint Mary's College after having played for BC Žalgiris of the Lithuanian Basketball League (LKL) and its reserve teams.

== Professional career ==
In 2022–2025, Juzėnas played for the BC Žalgiris' reserve teams BC Žalgiris-3 in the Regional Basketball League and BC Žalgiris-2 in the National Basketball League.

During the 2024–25 LKL season Juzėnas partly played for the primary BC Žalgiris team in ten Lithuanian Basketball League games and averaged 4.6 points, 1.7 rebounds, 0.8 assists. Moreover, during the 2024–2025 EuroLeague season Juzėnas on 7 November 2024 debuted with the primary team BC Žalgiris in the EuroLeague and in total played in three EuroLeague games.

== College career ==
On 29 April 2025 it was announced that Juzėnas will play for the NCAA Division I Saint Mary's College, starting with the 2025–26 NCAA season.

== National team career ==
Juzėnas played for the Lithuania men's national under-16 team in the 2022 FIBA U16 European Championship (averaged 2.8 points, 4.3 rebounds, and 1.3 assists) and helped the Lithuania's national team to win gold medal.

He also represented the Lithuania men's national under-18 team in the 2023 FIBA U18 European Championship (averaged 9.6 points, 6.6 rebounds, and 1.6 assists) and 2024 FIBA U18 EuroBasket (averaged 11.3 points, 5.6 rebounds, and 2 assists), but Lithuania was eliminated in the round of 16 and quarterfinal respectively.

At age 18, Juzėnas represented the Lithuania men's national under-20 basketball team in the 2025 FIBA U20 EuroBasket. He led Lithuania in the semi-final 81–71 victory versus France by scoring 21 points (7/10 three-pointers). In the final Juzėnas scored only 3 points in a 83–66 loss to Italy, however after averaging 11.7 points, 4.4 rebounds, 1.3 assists, and 1 steal per game Juzėnas was included into the tournament's All-Star Five.
