= Krister =

Krister is a Swedish variant of the Swedish masculine given name Christer. Notable people with the name include:

- Krister Bringéus (born 1954), Swedish diplomat
- Krister Classon (born 1955), Swedish comedian, actor, director and screenwriter
- Krister Dreyer (born 1974), Norwegian musician
- Krister Hammarbergh (born 1963), Swedish politician of the Moderate Party
- Krister Henriksson (born 1946), Swedish actor
- Krister Kumlin (born 1938), Swedish diplomat
- Krister Kristensson (1942–2023), Swedish football player
- Krister Linder (born 1970), Swedish electronic musician
- Krister Nordin (born 1968), Swedish football player
- Krister Örnfjäder (born 1952), Swedish social democratic politician
- Krister Sørgård (born 1970), Norwegian cross country skier
- Krister Stendahl (1921–2008), Swedish theologian
- Krister Wemberg (born 1992), Norwegian football player
- Krister Wickman (1924–1993), Swedish politician
