= Rasmus Persson (footballer) =

Swedish footballer

Personal information
- Full name: Clas Erik Rasmus Persson
- Date of birth: 25 May 1996 (age 30)
- Place of birth: Sweden
- Height: 1.70 m (5 ft 7 in)
- Position: Defender

Team information
- Current team: FK Karlskrona

Youth career
- –2011: IFÖ Bromölla IF
- 2012–: Mjällby AIF

Senior career*
Years	Team	Apps	(Gls)
2014–2016	Mjällby AIF	5	(0)
2017–	FK Karlskrona	0	(0)
- * Club domestic league appearances and goals as of 10 April 2017 (UTC)

Rasmus Persson (born 25 May 1996) is a Swedish footballer who plays for FK Karlskrona as a defender.
