= Ivan Volf =

Croatian-German basketball player (born 2006)

No. 44 – OKK Sloboda Tuzla
- Position: Shooting guard / Small forward
- League: Basketball Championship of Bosnia and Herzegovina

Personal information
- Born: 20 July 2006 (age 20) Germany
- Listed height: 2.01 m (6 ft 7 in)

Career information
- Playing career: 2022–present

Career history
- 2022–2025: Bayern Munich II
- 2024–2025: Bayern Munich
- 2025–2026: SC Rasta Vechta I/II
- 2025–2026: Artland Dragons
- 2026-present: OKK Sloboda Tuzla

Career highlights
- Bundesliga champion (2025)

Ivan Volf (born 20 July 2006) is a professional basketball player for OKK Sloboda Tuzla in the Bosnia and Herzegovinan Basketball Championship of Bosnia and Herzegovina. Standing at 2.01 m (6 ft 7 in), he primarily plays at the shooting guard position, but he can also play at the small forward position. Born in Germany, he has represented Croatia at youth international level.

== Early life and career ==
The son of Croatian parents, Volf was born and raised in Germany. He trained in the youth department of Bayern Munich.

== Professional career ==
In December 2022, Volf made his debut for Munich's second men's team in the 2. Bundesliga ProB. He first played in the Basketball Bundesliga in early November 2024. Later in the 2024–25 season, Bayern won the BBL championship.

In August 2025, Volf moved to SC Rasta Vechta and also plays for their cooperation partner Artland Dragons.

On September 19, 2026 he signed with OKK Sloboda Tuzla

== National team career ==
Volf became a Croatian youth international. He also participated in scouting events organized by the German Basketball Federation.
