= Indian Wells (musician) =

Italian IDM artist

Pietro Iannuzzi known professionally as Indian Wells is an IDM musician.

== Career ==
Iannuzzi's first exposure to electronic music was Massive Attack in the early 2000s. He specifically cites their 1997 album Mezzanine as an influence on his musical style. While attending university a friend showed him audio editing software and he started experimenting with it. The name Indian Wells comes from the tennis Indian Wells Open.

In 2013, Iannuzzi released his debut album called Night Drops which heavily sampled sounds from tennis matches.

Iannuzzi released his sophomore album in 2015 called Pause. The songs were created over a multi-year period and was a transitional album.

His third album was released September 8, 2017. The cover art for the album was made by Chiara Tomati. The album was produced by Friends of Friends.

No One Really Listens to Oscillators was released on July 15, 2022. The cover art for the album was created by Judith Scott. The track titled "Before Life" is dedicated to Iannuzzi's daughter. The album was produced by Max Cooper's Mesh imprint. The focus of the album is on the idea of unfinished works.

== Discography ==
=== Studio albums ===
- Night Drops (2013)
- Pause (2015)
- Pause Rmxs (2015)
- Where the World Ends (2017)
- No One Really Listens to Oscillators (2022)

=== Extended Plays ===
- Night Loops (2013)
- Phase Transition (2018)
- New Ruins (2022)

=== Singles ===
- "Night Loops" (2013)
- "Racquets" (2016)
- "Cascades" (2017)
- "It's Where The World Ends" (2017)
- "Forest Hills" (2017)
- "Closer" (2018)
- "0629" (2019)
- "The Outside" (2020)
- "Black Trees" (2020)
- "New Ruins" (2020)
- "Calabrian Woods" (2022)
- "Before Life" (2022)
- "Four Walls" (2022)
- "When You Were A Child And I Was Young" (2023)
- "Scordato" (2025)

=== Guest appearances ===
- :papercutz – "Rivers – Indian Wells Remix" from Rivers (At Dusk Remixed EP) (2013)
- Heathered Pearls – "Precious Dive – Indian Wells Remix" from Loyal Reworks (2013)
- Max Cooper – "Cascades – Outro Edit" from Anjunadeep 08 (2016)
- Sontag Shegun – "Tail – Indian Wells Remix" from Tale Remixed (2016)
- Sekuoia – "Rayanne (Indian Wells Remix)" from Flac (Remixes) (2017)
- Ricky Eat Acid – "This Is As Close To Heaven As I Get – Indian Wells Remix" from This Is As Close To Heaven As I Get (Indian Wells Remix) (2017)
- Jolly Mare – "Steam Engine – Indian Wells Remix" from Mechanics Remixed (2017)
- Bruce Harper – "Arms (Remix)" from Arms (Remix) (2017)
- Tomas Barford – "Pantheon – Indian Wells Remix" from Paloma Remixes (2018)
- Fla.mingo – "It's Where The World Ends" from FOF10: It's Where The World Ends (2019)
- Audego – "Disconnect (Indian Wells Remix)" from Disconnect (Indian Wells Remix) (2019)
- RYTERBAND – "Brillant Eyes (Indian Wells Remix)" from Brillant Eyes (Indian Wells Remix) (2020)
- Elephantides – "See – Indian Wells Remix" from Floating Tempo (2020)
- Marcus Grimm – "Clouds – Indian Wells Remix" from Somma, Ep. 1 (2022)

=== Compilation appearances ===
- "In The Streets – Heathered Pearls nautical remix" from Extended Current (2014)
- "Cascades" from !Kollections 05: Reflections (2017)
- "Cascades" from !Kollections 06: Summer in the Club (2018)
- "Hope – Indian Wells Remix" from One Hundred Billion Sparks Remixed (2019)
- "Ghost City" from FOF10: Singles 2015–2019 (2019)
- "Ghost City" from FOF10: Friends of Friends at 10 (2019)
- "Vilienza" from Vita lenta (2025)
