= Kristers Skrinda =

Latvian basketball player

No. 12 – Rīgas Zeļļi
- Position: Power forward
- League: LBL; Latvian-Estonian Basketball League

Personal information
- Born: 12 March 2006 (age 20) Rīga, Latvia
- Listed height: 6 ft 10 in (2.08 m)
- Listed weight: 198 lb (90 kg)

Career information
- College: Stanford (2025–present)
- Playing career: 2024–present

Career history
- 2024–2025: Rīgas Zeļļi
Medals
Men's basketball
Representing Latvia
FIBA U18 EuroBasket
Gold medal – first place	2023 Portugal	National team

Kristers Skrinda (born 12 March 2006) is a Latvian basketball player for the Rīgas Zeļļi of the Latvian-Estonian Basketball League. He is 2.08 m (6 ft 10 in) and plays power forward position. Skrinda has committed to Stanford.

== Career ==
In the summer of 2023, Skrinda joined Orange1 Basket academy in Italian city of Bassano del Grappa but spent there only few months. After returning home, on 9 February, 2024, he joined Rīgas Zeļļi.

On 18 November, 2024, Skrinda was announced as the first member of the Cardinal’s recruiting class of 2025.

== National team ==
Skrinda participated in 2023 FIBA U18 European Championship Division B, helping Latvia's junior team to win the tournament. One year later he was one of the best scorers and the second best rebounder of 2024 FIBA U18 EuroBasket.
