= Christer =

Christer or Krister are varieties of the masculine given name Kristian, derived from the Latin name Christianus, which in turn comes from the Greek word khristianós, which means "follower of Christ".

The name, written in its two variants Christer and Krister, is quite common in Norway and Sweden.

Notable people with the name include:

- Catherine Christer Hennix (1948–2023), Swedish-American composer, philosopher, scientist and visual artist associated with drone minimal music
- Christer Abris (formerly Abrahamsson, born 1947), Swedish former ice hockey goaltender
- Christer Adelsbo, born 1962, is a Swedish social democratic politician who has been a member of the Riksdag since 2002
- Christer Basma (born 1972), Norwegian football coach and defender
- Christer Björkman (born 1957), Swedish singer
- Christer Boucht (1911–2009), Finnish-Swedish lawyer, adventure traveller and writer
- Christer Boustedt (1939–1986), Swedish musician and actor
- Christer Dahl (born 1940), Swedish director, script writer and producer
- Christer Ellefsen (born 1978), Norwegian football defender
- Christer Engelhardt, born 1969, is a Swedish social democratic politician who has been a member of the Riksdag since 2002
- Christer Erséus (born 1951), Swedish zoologist
- Christer Flodin (born 1948), Swedish television actor, best known for his appearances in crime drama series
- Christer Fuglesang (born 1957), Swedish physicist and an ESA astronaut
- Christer Fursth (born 1970), Swedish football midfielder
- Christer Gardell (born 1960), Swedish venture capitalist
- Christer George (born 1979), Norwegian football player
- Christer Gulldén (born 1960), Swedish wrestler
- Christer Johansson (poker player), Swedish professional sports better and poker player based in Malmö
- Christer Johansson (skier), Swedish former cross country skier who competed in the 1970s
- Christer Johansson (table tennis) (born 1944), Swedish table tennis player
- Christer Kellgren (born 1958), retired Swedish professional ice hockey player
- Christer Kierkegaard (1918–1999), Swedish Navy rear admiral
- Christer Kleiven (born 1988), Norwegian midfielder who currently plays for Start
- Christer Löfqvist (1944–1978), former international speedway rider
- Christer Lindarw (born 1953), Swedish clothes designer, drag queen artist, leader of drag show group After Dark
- Christer Magnusson (born 1958), Swedish former handball player
- Christer Majbäck (born 1964), Swedish former cross country skier
- Christer Nylander (born 1968), Swedish Liberal People's Party politician, member of the Riksdag since 2002
- Christer Olsson (born 1970), retired professional hockey player
- Christer Pettersson (1947–2004), Swedish criminal, suspect in the 1986 assassination of Olof Palme, Prime Minister of Sweden
- Christer Sjögren (born 1950), Swedish dansband and rock singer
- Christer Skoog (born 1945), Swedish politician
- Christer Sturmark (born 1964), Swedish author, IT-entrepreneur and prominent debater on religion and humanism in Swedish media
- Christer Wallin (born 1969), former freestyle swimmer from Sweden
- Christer Warren (born 1974), English football player
- Christer Winbäck (born 1953), Swedish Liberal People's Party politician, member of the Riksdag since 2002
- Christer Youssef (born 1987), Swedish professional footballer Attacking midfielder
- Christer Zetterberg (1941–2012), Swedish businessman, chairman of investment bank Carnegie
- Lars-Christer Olsson, former UEFA Chief Executive from 2003
- Tom-Christer Nilsen (born 1969), Norwegian politician for the Conservative Party and current deputy county mayor of Hordaland

== See also ==
- Krister, Swedish variant of Christer
