= Neoklis Avdalas =

Greek basketball player (born 2006)

Neoklis Avdalas Νεοκλής Αβδάλας
No. 17 – North Carolina Tar Heels
- Position: Shooting guard / small forward
- Conference: Atlantic Coast Conference

Personal information
- Born: February 4, 2006 (age 20) Athens, Greece
- Listed height: 6 ft 9 in (2.06 m)
- Listed weight: 220 lb (100 kg)

Career information
- College: Virginia Tech (2025–2026); North Carolina (2026–present)
- Playing career: 2021–present

Career history
- 2021–present: Panathinaikos
- 2023–2024: →Karditsa
- 2024–2025: →Peristeri

Career highlights
- Greek Super Cup winner (2021); Greek All-Star (2023); Greek League Most Improved Player (2025); 2× Greek League Best Young Player (2024, 2025)

Neoklis "Neo" Avdalas (Greek: Νεοκλής "Νεο" Αβδάλας; born February 4, 2006) is a Greek college basketball player for the North Carolina Tar Heels of the Atlantic Coast Conference (ACC). he previously played for the Virginia Tech Hokies. Standing at 2.05 m (6 ft 9 in) tall, he can play at the point guard, shooting guard and small forward positions. He is the youngest son of former basketball player Dimitris Avdalas.

== College career ==
On June 16, 2025, Avdalas committed to the Virginia Tech Hokies. After the season ended for his college team, Avdalas returned to Panathinaikos for the remainder of the 2025–26 season.

On March 27, 2026, he entered the NCAA transfer portal after averaging 12.1 points, 4.6 assists, and 3.1 rebounds per game across 31 games in the 2025–2026 season.

On April 13, 2026, Avdalas committed to the North Carolina Tar Heels.

== Professional career ==
Avdalas began his professional career in 2021, with the Greek club Panathinaikos, under coaches Dimitrios Priftis and Georgios Vovoras. During his first season, he appeared in a total of 6 EuroLeague games and 10 Greek Basket League games.

In January 2022, Avdalas signed a new five-year professional contract with Panathinaikos.

On September 20, 2023, Avdalas was loaned to the Greek Basket League team Karditsa for the 2023–2024 campaign.

On July 25, 2024, Avdalas was loaned once more to the Basketball Champions League semi-finalists Peristeri for the 2024–2025 campaign.

== National team career ==
=== Greek junior national team ===
Avdalas represented the Greek Under-16 junior national team, in the International Under-16 Tournament, that took place in Messini, between July 28 and July 31, 2021. Participating teams at that tournament included Greece Under-16, Croatia Under-16, Poland Under-16 and North Macedonia Under-16. Avdalas was the leading scorer of Greece during the tournament, with 68 total points scored, in four games played.

== Career statistics ==
Legend
GP	Games played	GS	Games started	MPG	Minutes per game
FG%	Field-goal percentage	3P%	3-point field-goal percentage	FT%	Free-throw percentage
RPG	Rebounds per game	APG	Assists per game	SPG	Steals per game
BPG	Blocks per game	PPG	Points per game	PIR	Performance index rating
**Bold**	Career high

=== EuroLeague ===
Year	Team	GP	GS	MPG	FG%	3P%	FT%	RPG	APG	SPG	BPG	PPG	PIR
2021–22	Panathinaikos	**6**	0	**2.5**	**.333**	.000	—	—	**.2**	—	—	0.3	-0.3
2022–23	Panathinaikos	1	0	1.0	—	—	—	—	—	—	—	0.0	-1.0
Career		7	0	2.3	.333	.000	—	—	.1	—	—	0.3	-0.4
