= 2018 FIBA U20 European Championship =

21st edition of the FIBA U20 European Championship

Tournament details
- Host country: Germany
- City: Chemnitz
- Dates: 14–22 July
- Teams: 16
- Venue: 2 (in 1 host city)

Final positions
- Champions: Israel (1st title)
- Runners-up: Croatia
- Third place: Germany
- Fourth place: France

Tournament statistics
- Games played: 56
- MVP: (Israel) Yovel Zoosman
- Top scorer: (Sweden) Elijah Clarance (22.4 points per game)

Official website
- www.fiba.basketball

The 2018 FIBA U20 European Championship was the 21st edition of the FIBA U20 European Championship. The competition took place in Chemnitz, Germany from 14 to 22 July 2018. Israel U20 became the European champions for the first time.

== Participating teams ==
- Croatia ▲ (Runners-up, 2017 FIBA U20 European Championship Division B)
- France
- Germany
- Great Britain ▲ (3rd place, 2017 FIBA U20 European Championship Division B)
- Greece
- Iceland
- Israel
- Italy
- Lithuania
- Montenegro
- Romania ▲ (Winners, 2017 FIBA U20 European Championship Division B)
- Serbia
- Spain
- Sweden
- Turkey
- Ukraine

== Venues ==
2018 FIBA U20 European Championship is located in Germany	Chemnitz	
2018 FIBA U20 European Championship is located in Germany	Messe Chemnitz	Richard-Hartmann-Halle
2018 FIBA U20 European Championship is located in Germany	Capacity: 4,000	Capacity: 2,900

== First round ==
In this round, the 16 teams are allocated in four groups of four teams each. All teams will advance to the Second Round of 16.

All times are local (UTC+2).

=== Group A ===
Pos	Team	Pld	W	L	PF	PA	PD	Pts
1	Lithuania	3	3	0	273	222	+51	6
2	Turkey	3	2	1	231	216	+15	5
3	Montenegro	3	1	2	222	253	−31	4
4	Great Britain	3	0	3	206	241	−35	3

Source: FIBA
Rules for classification: 1) Points; 2) Head-to-head results; 3) Points difference; 4) Points scored.

14 July 2018
15:45

Boxscore

Great Britain	62–76	Turkey
Scoring by quarter: 14–21, 13–24, 10–17, 25–14
Pts: Wheatle 16; Rebs: Boachie-Yiadom 9 Asts: Watson-Gayle 5		Pts: Mustafa 20; Rebs: three players 6 Asts: Al 5

Richard-Hartmann-Halle, Chemnitz

14 July 2018
18:00

Boxscore

Lithuania	94–82	Montenegro
Scoring by quarter: 25–9, 25–25, 16–30, 17–5
Pts: Masiulis 21; Rebs: Masiulis 15; Asts: Slavinskas, Velička 5		Pts: M. Popović 27; Rebs: Simonović 17; Asts: M. Popović, V. Popović 4

Richard-Hartmann-Halle, Chemnitz

15 July 2018
13:30

Boxscore

Montenegro	80–70	Great Britain
Scoring by quarter: 26–11, 20–18, 18–21, 16–20
Pts: M. Popović 29; Rebs: M. Popović 17; Asts: Starovlah 5		Pts: Wheatle 26; Rebs: Wheatle 14; Asts: Watson-Gayle 5

Messe Chemnitz, Chemnitz

15 July 2018
18:00

Boxscore

Turkey	66–94	Lithuania
Scoring by quarter: 22–34, 19–16, 13–23, 12–21
Pts: Atar 17; Rebs: Mustafa 6 Asts: Al 5		Pts: Stankevičius 17; Rebs: Tubutis 7 Asts: three players 4

Messe Chemnitz, Chemnitz

16 July 2018
13:30

Boxscore

Montenegro	60–89	Turkey
Scoring by quarter: 20–26, 12–21, 9–22, 19–20
Pts: M. Popović, V. Popović 10; Rebs: Božović 9 Asts: Raspopović 3		Pts: Mustafa 15; Rebs: Doğan 7 Asts: Al 8

Richard-Hartmann-Halle, Chemnitz

16 July 2018
20:15

Boxscore

Great Britain	74–85	Lithuania
Scoring by quarter: 22–29, 16–20, 15–19, 21–17
Pts: Eytle-Rock, Wheatle 14; Rebs: Boachie-Yiadom 10; Asts: Russell 3		Pts: Masiulis 22; Rebs: Kozys 7 Asts: Velička 4

Richard-Hartmann-Halle, Chemnitz

=== Group B ===
Pos	Team	Pld	W	L	PF	PA	PD	Pts
1	Croatia	3	3	0	246	206	+40	6
2	France	3	1	2	198	207	−9	4 (Note: France 1–1, +1 PD; Ukraine 1–1, 0 PD; Spain 1–1, –1 PD)
3	Ukraine	3	1	2	223	238	−15	4
4	Spain	3	1	2	225	241	−16	4

Source: FIBA
Rules for classification: 1) Points; 2) Head-to-head results; 3) Points difference; 4) Points scored.
Notes:

14 July 2018
13:30

Boxscore

Ukraine	82–79	Spain
Scoring by quarter: 25–25, 17–18, 20–20, 20–16
Pts: Niemtsu, Tyrtyshnyk 17; Rebs: Tyrtyshnyk 6 Asts: Horobchenko 5		Pts: Font 28; Rebs: Ehigiator, Vila 7 Asts: Figueras 9

Richard-Hartmann-Halle, Chemnitz

14 July 2018
20:15

Boxscore

France	58–68	Croatia
Scoring by quarter: 21–21, 11–14, 6–17, 20–16
Pts: Tchouaffé 14; Rebs: Rambaut 6 Asts: Goudou-Sinha 4		Pts: Čolak 14; Rebs: Kalajžić, Ljubičić 6 Asts: Kalajžić 5

Richard-Hartmann-Halle, Chemnitz

15 July 2018
15:45

Boxscore

Spain	76–74	France
Scoring by quarter: 20–19, 17–17, 19–20, 20–18
Pts: Font 28; Rebs: Ehigiator 9 Asts: Figueras 7		Pts: Diawara, Tchouaffé 14; Rebs: Bazille, Vautier 7 Asts: three players 2

Richard-Hartmann-Halle, Chemnitz

15 July 2018
15:45

Boxscore

Croatia	93–78	Ukraine
Scoring by quarter: 20–15, 24–26, 30–14, 19–23
Pts: Perković, Nakić 18; Rebs: Nakić 7 Asts: Uljarević 10		Pts: Tyrtyshnyk 23; Rebs: three players 4 Asts: Horobchenko 10

Messe Chemnitz, Chemnitz

16 July 2018
13:30

Boxscore

Ukraine	63–66	France
Scoring by quarter: 12–17, 18–18, 17–12, 16–19
Pts: Voinalovych 23; Rebs: Tyrtyshnyk 7 Asts: Niemtsu 4		Pts: Vautier 15; Rebs: Vautier 13; Asts: N'Doye 6

Messe Chemnitz, Chemnitz

16 July 2018
18:00

Boxscore

Croatia	85–70	Spain
Scoring by quarter: 15–15, 23–22, 23–18, 24–15
Pts: Perković 21; Rebs: Kalajžić 6 Asts: Uljarević, Vrgoč 2		Pts: Puerto 14; Rebs: Tomaic 6 Asts: Figueras 7

Messe Chemnitz, Chemnitz

=== Group C ===
Pos	Team	Pld	W	L	PF	PA	PD	Pts
1	Germany (H)	3	3	0	228	205	+23	6
2	Israel	3	2	1	260	192	+68	5
3	Greece	3	1	2	252	250	+2	4
4	Romania	3	0	3	180	273	−93	3

Source: FIBA
Rules for classification: 1) Points; 2) Head-to-head results; 3) Points difference; 4) Points scored.
(H) Hosts

14 July 2018
15:45

Boxscore

Romania	62–92	Greece
Scoring by quarter: 7–15, 17–25, 22–29, 16–23
Pts: Berculescu-Rovinaru 19; Rebs: Fometescu 6 Asts: Diculescu 5		Pts: Moraitis 16; Rebs: four players 5 Asts: Lountzis, Moraitis 4

Messe Chemnitz, Chemnitz

14 July 2018
20:15

Boxscore

Germany	60–59	Israel
Scoring by quarter: 15–16, 14–14, 15–9, 16–20
Pts: Stanić 12; Rebs: Freudenberg 9 Asts: three players 2		Pts: Brisker 13; Rebs: Moshkovitz 10; Asts: Brisker, Zoosman 3

Messe Chemnitz, Chemnitz

15 July 2018
18:00

Boxscore

Israel	95–48	Romania
Scoring by quarter: 23–11, 26–15, 23–14, 23–8
Pts: Brisker 15; Rebs: Avdija 10; Asts: Shabat, Zoosman 4		Pts: Berceanu 10; Rebs: Diculescu 8 Asts: Mureșan 3

Richard-Hartmann-Halle, Chemnitz

15 July 2018
20:15

Boxscore

Greece	76–82	Germany
Scoring by quarter: 10–14, 27–20, 14–24, 25–24
Pts: Kalaitzakis 21; Rebs: Lountzis 7 Asts: Kalaitzakis 3		Pts: Mushidi 15; Rebs: Olinde 9 Asts: Hundt 6

Messe Chemnitz, Chemnitz

16 July 2018
18:00

Boxscore

Israel	106–84	Greece
Scoring by quarter: 29–13, 34–17, 20–27, 23–27
Pts: Avdija 20; Rebs: Avdija 7 Asts: three players 4		Pts: Kalaitzakis 19; Rebs: Lountzis 6 Asts: Lountzis, Moraitis 4

Richard-Hartmann-Halle, Chemnitz

16 July 2018
20:15

Boxscore

Romania	70–86	Germany
Scoring by quarter: 22–19, 14–20, 28–25, 6–22
Pts: Berculescu-Rovinaru 19; Rebs: Diculescu 11; Asts: Diculescu 7		Pts: Stanić 13; Rebs: Olinde 6 Asts: Haßfurther 5

Messe Chemnitz, Chemnitz

=== Group D ===
Pos	Team	Pld	W	L	PF	PA	PD	Pts
1	Serbia	3	3	0	274	205	+69	6
2	Italy	3	2	1	244	206	+38	5
3	Sweden	3	1	2	229	237	−8	4
4	Iceland	3	0	3	180	279	−99	3

Source: FIBA
Rules for classification: 1) Points; 2) Head-to-head results; 3) Points difference; 4) Points scored.

14 July 2018
13:30

Boxscore

Italy	85–71	Sweden
Scoring by quarter: 28–19, 18–18, 17–12, 22–22
Pts: Lever 27; Rebs: Oxilia 11; Asts: Pajola 5		Pts: Clarance 17; Rebs: three players 7 Asts: Clarance 5

Messe Chemnitz, Chemnitz

14 July 2018
18:00

Boxscore

Iceland	60–107	Serbia
Scoring by quarter: 22–23, 16–24, 12–22, 10–38
Pts: Gudmundsson 18; Rebs: three players 5 Asts: Þorbjarnarson 5		Pts: Marjanović 15; Rebs: Glišić 9 Asts: Vulikić, Tadić 3

Messe Chemnitz, Chemnitz

15 July 2018
13:30

Boxscore

Sweden	91–64	Iceland
Scoring by quarter: 23–25, 24–12, 21–13, 23–14
Pts: Clarance 22; Rebs: Johansson 7 Asts: Clarance, Dibba 5		Pts: Gudmundsson 16; Rebs: Halldórsson 7 Asts: Þorbjarnarson 5

Richard-Hartmann-Halle, Chemnitz

15 July 2018
20:15

Boxscore

Serbia	79–78	Italy
Scoring by quarter: 22–18, 15–22, 22–18, 20–20
Pts: Glišić 16; Rebs: Simanić 7 Asts: Aranitović 4		Pts: Moretti 29; Rebs: Lever 7 Asts: Pajola 5

Richard-Hartmann-Halle, Chemnitz

16 July 2018
15:45

Boxscore

Iceland	56–81	Italy
Scoring by quarter: 11–19, 17–23, 7–22, 21–17
Pts: Sverrisson 11; Rebs: Jónsson 6 Asts: three players 3		Pts: Mezzanotte 14; Rebs: Caruso, Lever 6 Asts: Bucarelli 7

Messe Chemnitz, Chemnitz

16 July 2018
15:45

Boxscore

Sweden	67–88	Serbia
Scoring by quarter: 26–22, 16–21, 10–27, 15–18
Pts: Clarance 27; Rebs: Hook 5 Asts: Clarance 2		Pts: Musić, Simanić 16; Rebs: Glišić 10; Asts: Musić 9

Richard-Hartmann-Halle, Chemnitz

== Final round ==
=== Bracket ===
Round of 16
18 July
Lithuania	70
Spain	75
18 July
Israel	72
Sweden	63
18 July
France	70
Montenegro	37
18 July
Serbia	105
Romania	58
18 July
Turkey	104
Ukraine	46
18 July
Germany	77
Iceland	63
18 July
Croatia	93
Great Britain	62
18 July
Italy	76
Greece	70

Quarterfinals
19 July
Spain	75
Israel	98
19 July
France	60
Serbia	59
19 July
Turkey	61
Germany	78
19 July
Croatia	79
Italy	68

Semifinals
21 July
Israel	83
France	57
21 July
Germany	61
Croatia	69

Final
22 July
Israel	80
Croatia	66
Third place
22 July
France	71
Germany	80

=== Round of 16 ===
18 July 2018
13:30

Boxscore

Croatia	93–62	Great Britain
Scoring by quarter: 24–9, 26–18, 23–19, 20–16
Pts: Kalajžić, Perković 15; Rebs: Ljubičić 6 Asts: Uljarević 9		Pts: Fuller, Wheatle 11; Rebs: three players 6 Asts: Watson-Gayle 3

Messe Chemnitz, Chemnitz
Referees: Hugues Thépénier (FRA), Petar Denkovski (MKD), Alexey Davydov (RUS)

18 July 2018
13:30

Boxscore

Lithuania	70–75	Spain
Scoring by quarter: 21–15, 8–11, 19–18, 22–31
Pts: Masiulis 19; Rebs: Masiulis, Velička 5 Asts: Velička 4		Pts: Font 23; Rebs: Parra 8 Asts: Figueras 6

Richard-Hartmann-Halle, Chemnitz
Referees: Martin Horozov (BUL), Martin Vulić (CRO), Osman Sinan İşgüder (TUR)

18 July 2018
15:45

Boxscore

Italy	76–70	Greece
Scoring by quarter: 21–16, 20–17, 13–17, 22–20
Pts: Oxilia 16; Rebs: Oxilia 14; Asts: Bucarelli 5		Pts: Lountzis 14; Rebs: Christidis 8 Asts: Moraitis 5

Messe Chemnitz, Chemnitz
Referees: Martins Kozlovskis (LAT), Chris Dodds (GBR), Nemanja Ninkovic (SRB)

18 July 2018
15:45

Boxscore

Israel	72–63	Sweden
Scoring by quarter: 23–13, 16–17, 11–14, 22–19
Pts: Avdija 22; Rebs: Moshkovitz 11; Asts: Moshkovitz 3		Pts: Clarance, Czerapowicz 16; Rebs: Clarance 8 Asts: Johansson 3

Richard-Hartmann-Halle, Chemnitz
Referees: Zdravko Rutesic (MTN), Marius Ciulin (ROM), Valerio Grigioni (ITA)

18 July 2018
18:00

Boxscore

Turkey	104–46	Ukraine
Scoring by quarter: 26–12, 30–9, 23–10, 25–15
Pts: Karahan 15; Rebs: Onar 10; Asts: Al 7		Pts: Bondarenko 7 Rebs: Grytsak 6 Asts: Tyrtyshnyk, Yagodin 3

Messe Chemnitz, Chemnitz
Referees: Georgios Poursanidis (GRE), Sigmundur Herbertsson (ISL), Haris Bijedic (BOS)

18 July 2018
18:00

Boxscore

France	70–37	Montenegro
Scoring by quarter: 13–11, 14–7, 22–5, 21–14
Pts: Tchouaffé 15; Rebs: Vautier 9 Asts: Diawara, Goudou-Sinha 4		Pts: M. Popović 11; Rebs: M. Popović 15; Asts: V. Popović, Starovlah 2

Richard-Hartmann-Halle, Chemnitz
Referees: Carsten Straube (GER), Francisco Araña (ESP), Rickard Eriksson (SWE)

18 July 2018
20:15

Boxscore

Germany	77–63	Iceland
Scoring by quarter: 29–5, 15–20, 19–10, 14–28
Pts: Mushidi 18; Rebs: Lagerpusch 10; Asts: Hundt 4		Pts: Hrafnsson 17; Rebs: Stefansson 9 Asts: Gudmundsson 8

Messe Chemnitz, Chemnitz
Referees: Manuel Mazzoni (ITA), Anastasios Piloidis (GRE), Alakbar Hasanov (AZR)

18 July 2018
20:15

Boxscore

Serbia	105–58	Romania
Scoring by quarter: 28–17, 27–8, 31–17, 19–16
Pts: Aranitović 18; Rebs: Đorđević 9 Asts: Musić, Tadić 5		Pts: Berculescu-Rovinaru 11; Rebs: Petrescu 9 Asts: Mureșan 7

Richard-Hartmann-Halle, Chemnitz
Referees: Gintaras Vitkauskas (LTU), Sergiy Zashchuk (UKR), Kfir Mualem (ISR)

=== Quarterfinals ===
19 July 2018
13:30

Boxscore

Spain	75–98	Israel
Scoring by quarter: 25–27, 12–24, 20–17, 18–30
Pts: Parra 24; Rebs: Parra 15; Asts: Figueras 8		Pts: Zoosman 25; Rebs: Beni 10; Asts: Zoosman 5

Messe Chemnitz, Chemnitz
Referees: Georgios Poursanidis (GRE), Carsten Straube (GER), Rickard Eriksson (SWE)

19 July 2018
15:45

Boxscore

Croatia	79–68	Italy
Scoring by quarter: 23–13, 18–28, 15–17, 23–10
Pts: Perković 14; Rebs: Ljubičić 9 Asts: Uljarević 7		Pts: Oxilia 14; Rebs: Oxilia 8 Asts: Bucarelli 5

Messe Chemnitz, Chemnitz
Referees: Martin Horozov (BUL), Zdravko Rutesic (MTN), Sigmundur Herbertsson (ISL)

19 July 2018
18:00

Boxscore

France	60–59	Serbia
Scoring by quarter: 21–9, 16–19, 10–20, 13–11
Pts: Fevrier 20; Rebs: Fevrier 8 Asts: Desseignet 4		Pts: Radanov 20; Rebs: Glišić 10; Asts: Musić 7

Messe Chemnitz, Chemnitz
Referees: Osman Sinan İşgüder (TUR), Marius Ciulin (ROU), Alakbar Hasanov (AZE)

19 July 2018
20:15

Boxscore

Turkey	61–78	Germany
Scoring by quarter: 13–14, 9–27, 19–20, 20–17
Pts: Atar 16; Rebs: Atar 9 Asts: Al 3		Pts: Mushidi 22; Rebs: Stanić 10; Asts: Mushidi 5

Messe Chemnitz, Chemnitz
Referees: Mārtiņš Kozlovskis (LAT), Gintaras Vitkauskas (LTU), Hugues Thépénier (FRA)

=== Semifinals ===
21 July 2018
18:00

Boxscore

Israel	83–57	France
Scoring by quarter: 25–13, 20–12, 21–11, 17–21
Pts: Brisker 18; Rebs: Avdija 7 Asts: Brisker 4		Pts: Goudou-Sinha 14; Rebs: Diawara 6 Asts: Diawara 5

Messe Chemnitz, Chemnitz
Referees: Martin Horozov (BUL), Zdravko Rutesic (MNE), Gintaras Vitkauskas (LTU)

21 July 2018
20:15

Boxscore

Germany	61–69	Croatia
Scoring by quarter: 18–19, 13–13, 16–18, 14–19
Pts: Hassfurther 15; Rebs: Stanić 8 Asts: Hassfurther, Zylka 3		Pts: Kalajžić, Ljubičić 18; Rebs: Kalajžić 11; Asts: Uljarević 7

Messe Chemnitz, Chemnitz
Referees: Manuel Mazzoni (ITA), Francisco Araña (ESP), Osman Sinan İşgüder (TUR)

=== Third place match ===
22 July 2018
16:45

Boxscore

France	71–80	Germany
Scoring by quarter: 26–24, 18–18, 15–17, 12–21
Pts: Diawara 19; Rebs: Diawara 9 Asts: Goudou-Sinha 6		Pts: Stanić 22; Rebs: Freudenberg, Stanić 7 Asts: Hundt 4

Messe Chemnitz, Chemnitz
Referees: Anastasios Piloidis (GRE), Marius Ciulin (ROM), Martin Vulić (CRO)

=== Final ===
22 July 2018
19:00

Boxscore

Israel	80–66	Croatia
Scoring by quarter: 20–16, 25–18, 15–16, 20–16
Pts: Brisker 19; Rebs: Ruina 14; Asts: Zoosman 4		Pts: Kalajžić 18; Rebs: Kalajžić 7 Asts: Uljarević 4

Messe Chemnitz, Chemnitz
Referees: Carsten Straube (GER), Georgios Poursanidis (GRE), Mārtiņš Kozlovskis (LAT)

=== 5th–8th place classification ===
5th–8th place semifinals
21 July
Spain	70
Serbia	89
21 July
Turkey	91
Italy	80

5th place match
22 July
Serbia	73
Turkey	89
7th place match
22 July
Spain	85
Italy	60

=== 9th–16th place classification ===
9th–16th place quarterfinals
19 July
Lithuania	90
Sweden	85
19 July
Montenegro	98
Romania	61
19 July
Ukraine	94
Iceland	72
19 July
Great Britain	77
Greece	64

9th–12th place semifinals
21 July
Lithuania	76
Montenegro	58
21 July
Ukraine	66
Great Britain	82

9th place match
22 July
Lithuania	76
Great Britain	62
11th place match
22 July
Montenegro	98
Ukraine	79

13th–16th place semifinals
21 July
Sweden	80
Romania	72
21 July
Iceland	86
Greece	104

13th place match
22 July
Sweden	64
Greece	77
15th place match
22 July
Romania	84
Iceland	103

== Final standings ==
Rank	Team	Record
1st place, gold medalist(s)	Israel	6–1
2nd place, silver medalist(s)	Croatia	6–1
3rd place, bronze medalist(s)	Germany	6–1
4	France	3–4
5	Turkey	5–2
6	Serbia	5–2
7	Spain	3–4
8	Italy	3–4
9	Lithuania	6–1
10	Great Britain	2–5
11	Montenegro	3–4
12	Ukraine	2–5
13	Greece	3–4
14	Sweden	2–5
15	Iceland	1–6
16	Romania	0–7

Relegated to the 2019 FIBA U20 European Championship Division B

== Awards ==
=== Most Valuable Player ===
Most Valuable Player
(Israel) Yovel Zoosman

=== All-Tournament Team ===
- (Croatia) Mate Kalajžić
- (Germany) Kostja Mushidi
- (Israel) Yovel Zoosman
- (Israel) Deni Avdija
- (Germany) Filip Stanić

== See also ==
- 2018 FIBA U20 European Championship Division B
