= Avdija =

Avdija is a given name and surname. Notable people with the name include:

- Avdija Vršajević (born 1986), Bosnian footballer
- Deni Avdija (born 2001), Israeli basketball player
- Zufer Avdija (born 1959), Serbian–Israeli basketball coach
