= 2016–17 St. John's Red Storm men's basketball team =

American college basketball season

2016–17 St. John's Red Storm men's basketball
- Conference: Big East Conference
- Record: 14–19 (7–11 Big East)
- Head coach: Chris Mullin (2nd season)
- Assistant coaches: Mitch Richmond; Matt Abdelmassih; Greg St. Jean
- Home arena: Carnesecca Arena; Madison Square Garden

2016–17 Big East men's basketball standings
	Conf.				Overall
Team	W		L	PCT	W		L	PCT
No. 1 Villanova †	15	–	3	.833	32	–	4	.889
No. 21 Butler	12	–	6	.667	25	–	9	.735
Creighton	10	–	8	.556	25	–	10	.714
Seton Hall	10	–	8	.556	21	–	12	.636
Providence	10	–	8	.556	20	–	13	.606
Marquette	10	–	8	.556	19	–	13	.594
Xavier	9	–	9	.500	24	–	14	.632
St. John's	7	–	11	.389	14	–	19	.424
Georgetown	5	–	13	.278	14	–	18	.438
DePaul	2	–	16	.111	9	–	23	.281
† 2017 Big East tournament winner Rankings from AP poll

The 2016–17 St. John's Red Storm men's basketball team represented St. John's University during the 2016–17 NCAA Division I men's basketball season. They were coached by alumni and Naismith Memorial Basketball Hall of Fame member Chris Mullin in his second year at the school. They played their home games at Carnesecca Arena and Madison Square Garden as members of the Big East Conference. They finished the regular season 14–19, 7–11 in Big East play to finish in eighth place. They defeated Georgetown in the first round of the Big East tournament before losing to Villanova in the quarterfinals.

== Previous season ==
The Red Storm finished the 2015–16 season with a record of 8–24, 1–17 in Big East play to finish in last place in conference. They lost to Marquette in the first round of the Big East tournament.

== Preseason ==
Prior to the season, St. John's was picked to finish in eighth place in a poll of Big East coaches. Shamorie Ponds was named the preseason Rookie of the Year.

== Offseason ==
=== Departures ===
Name	Number	Pos.	Height	Weight	Year	Hometown	Notes
Christian Jones	2	F	6'7"	230	RS Junior	Arlington, Texas	Graduated; Transferred to UNLV
Durand Johnson	5	G	6'6"	210	Graduate student	Baltimore, Maryland	Graduated
Felix Balamou	10	G	6'4"	205	Senior	Conakry, Guinea	Graduated
Ron M'Vouika	24	G	6'6"	210	Graduate student	Paris, France	Graduated
Yankuba Sima	35	C	6'11"	220	Sophomore	Girona, Spain	Transferred to Oklahoma State (mid-season)

=== 2016 recruiting class ===
College recruiting information
Name	Hometown	School	Height	Weight	Commit date
Shamorie Ponds; PG	Brooklyn, NY	Thomas Jefferson High School	6 ft 1 in (1.85 m)	170 lb (77 kg)	Sep 29, 2015
Shamorie Ponds; PG	Recruit ratings: Scout: Rivals: 247Sports: (88)				
Richard Freudenberg; PF	Heidelberg, Germany	Bayern Munich	6 ft 9 in (2.06 m)	210 lb (95 kg)	Feb 4, 2016
Richard Freudenberg; PF	Recruit ratings: Scout: Rivals: 247Sports: (NR)				
Overall recruit ranking:
Note: In many cases, Scout, Rivals, 247Sports, On3, and ESPN may conflict in their listings of height and weight.; In these cases, the average was taken. ESPN grades are on a 100-point scale.; Sources: "2016 Team Ranking". Rivals.

=== Transfer additions ===
Name	Pos.	Height	Weight	Year	Hometown	Notes
Bashir Ahmed	G/F	6'7"	210	Junior	Bronx, New York	junior college transfer from Hutchinson Community College (2 yrs immediate eligibility)
Marvin Clark Jr.	F	6'7"	225	Junior	Kansas City, Missouri	transfer from Michigan State (2 yrs eligibility remaining)
Justin Simon	G	6'5"	205	Sophomore	Temecula, California	transfer from Arizona (3 yrs eligibility remaining)

=== 2017 Recruiting class ===
College recruiting information (2017)
Name	Hometown	School	Height	Weight	Commit date
Sidney Wilson; SF	Bronx, NY	Brewster Academy	6 ft 7 in (2.01 m)	170 lb (77 kg)	May 20, 2017
Sidney Wilson; SF	Recruit ratings: Scout: Rivals: 247Sports: (81)				
Bryan Trimble; SG	Kansas City, MO	Sunrise Christian Academy	6 ft 3 in (1.91 m)	220 lb (100 kg)	Jun 12, 2017
Bryan Trimble; SG	Recruit ratings: Scout: Rivals: 247Sports: (79)				
Boubacar Diakite; SF	Bamako, Mali	Our Savior New American School	6 ft 7 in (2.01 m)	185 lb (84 kg)	Jun 13, 2016
Boubacar Diakite; SF	Recruit ratings: Scout: 247Sports: (78)				
Overall recruit ranking:
Note: In many cases, Scout, Rivals, 247Sports, On3, and ESPN may conflict in their listings of height and weight.; In these cases, the average was taken. ESPN grades are on a 100-point scale.; Sources: "2017 Team Ranking". Rivals.

== Roster ==
2016–17 St. John's Red Storm men's basketball team
Players
Coaches

Pos.	#	Name	Height	Weight	Year	Previous school	Hometown
G	0	Malik Ellison	6 ft 6 in (1.98 m)	215 lb (98 kg)	So	Life Center Academy	Voorhees, NJ
G/F	1	Bashir Ahmed	6 ft 7 in (2.01 m)	210 lb (95 kg)	Jr	Hutchinson C.C.	Bronx, NY
G	2	Shamorie Ponds	6 ft 1 in (1.85 m)	170 lb (77 kg)	Fr	Thomas Jefferson	Brooklyn, NY
F	3	Amar Alibegović	6 ft 9 in (2.06 m)	240 lb (109 kg)	Jr	Instituto Tecnico Minerva	Rome, Italy
G	4	Federico Mussini	6 ft 2 in (1.88 m)	170 lb (77 kg)	So	Liceo Scientifico Aldo Moro	Reggio Emilia, Italy
G	5	Justin Simon (redshirt)	6 ft 5 in (1.96 m)	205 lb (93 kg)	So	Arizona	Temcula, CA
F	10	Marvin Clark Jr. (redshirt)	6 ft 7 in (2.01 m)	225 lb (102 kg)	Jr	Michigan State	Kansas City, MO
F	11	Tariq Owens	6 ft 11 in (2.11 m)	200 lb (91 kg)	RS So	Tennessee	Odenton, MD
G	12	Elijah Holifield (W)	6 ft 3 in (1.91 m)	185 lb (84 kg)	So	Pace Academy	Atlanta, GA
F	14	Kassoum Yakwe	6 ft 7 in (2.01 m)	210 lb (95 kg)	So	Our Savior New American	Bamako, Mali
G	15	Marcus LoVett Jr.	6 ft 0 in (1.83 m)	175 lb (79 kg)	RS Fr	Morgan Park	Fort Wayne, IN
F	20	Richard Freudenberg	6 ft 9 in (2.06 m)	210 lb (95 kg)	Fr	Luitpold Gymnasium	Heidelberg, Germany
G	23	Justin Cole (W)	6 ft 2 in (1.88 m)	190 lb (86 kg)	Fr	Archbishop Molloy	Rockville Centre, NY
G	24	Brandon Lawrence (W)	6 ft 3 in (1.91 m)	175 lb (79 kg)	Fr	Moreau Catholic	Union City, CA
F	45	Darien Williams	6 ft 8 in (2.03 m)	235 lb (107 kg)	Sr	City College of San Francisco	Cerritos, CA

Head coach

- Chris Mullin (St. John's)

Assistant coach(es)

- Mitch Richmond
- Matt Abdelmassih
- Greg St. Jean

Legend

- (C) Team captain
- (S) Suspended
- (I) Ineligible
- (W) Walk-on
- Injured
- Current redshirt

Roster

== Schedule and results ==
Date time, TV	Rank^{#}	Opponent^{#}	Result	Record	High points	High rebounds	High assists	Site (attendance) city, state
Exhibition
Oct 31, 2016*; 7:00 pm, ESPN3		Baruch	W 99–49		21 – Mussini	12 – Owens	5 – Lovett	Carnesecca Arena (3,727); Queens, NY
Non-conference regular season
Nov 11, 2016*; 9:00 pm, FSN		Bethune-Cookman	W 100–53	1–0	20 – Mussini	4 – Tied	7 – Lovett	Carnesecca Arena (4,371); Queens, NY
Nov 14, 2016*; 6:30 pm, FS1		Binghamton; Battle 4 Atlantis opening round	W 77–61	2–0	23 – Lovett	10 – Ponds	4 – Tied	Carnesecca Arena (4,969); Queens, NY
Nov 18, 2016*; 9:00 pm, BTN		at Minnesota; Gavitt Tipoff Games	L 86–92	2–1	31 – Lovett	10 – Ahmed	5 – Lovett	Williams Arena (8,873); Minneapolis, MN
Nov 23, 2016*; 7:00 pm, AXS TV		vs. No. 24 Michigan State; Battle 4 Atlantis quarterfinals	L 62–73	2–2	20 – Lovett	7 – Tied	3 – Ellison	Imperial Arena (2,344); Nassau, Bahamas
Nov 24, 2016*; 7:00 pm, AXS TV		vs. VCU; Battle 4 Atlantis consolation second round	L 69–75	2–3	18 – Ponds	7 – Tied	5 – Lovett	Imperial Arena (1,362); Nassau, Bahamas
Nov 25, 2016*; 9:30 pm, AXS TV		vs. Old Dominion; Battle 4 Atlantis 7th place game	L 55–63	2–4	16 – Lovett	7 – Ponds	3 – Ponds	Imperial Arena (969); Nassau, Bahamas
Nov 29, 2016*; 6:30 pm, FS2		Delaware State	L 72–79	2–5	19 – Ahmed	9 – Ponds	4 – Ponds	Carnesecca Arena (4,109); Queens, NY
Dec 2, 2016*; 8:00 pm, ESPNews		at Tulane	W 95–75	3–5	18 – Lovett	7 – Ahmed	5 – Lovett	Devlin Fieldhouse (2,563); New Orleans, LA
Dec 5, 2016*; 6:30 pm, FS1		Cal State Northridge	W 76–70	4–5	25 – Ponds	8 – Ahmed	5 – Tied	Carnesecca Arena (3,901); Queens, NY
Dec 8, 2016*; 6:30 pm, FS1		Fordham; Rivalry	W 90–62	5–5	26 – Ponds	8 – Alibegovic	9 – Ponds	Carnesecca Arena (4,474); Queens, NY
Dec 11, 2016*; 12:00 pm, FS1		vs. LIU Brooklyn; Brooklyn Hoops Winter Festival	L 73–74	5–6	18 – Ponds	7 – Williams	5 – Ellison	Barclays Center (7,514); Brooklyn, NY
Dec 18, 2016*; 11:00 am, FS1		vs. Penn State; Madison Square Garden Holiday Festival	L 76–92	5–7	22 – Ellison	11 – Owens	4 – Ponds	Madison Square Garden (8,200); New York City, NY
Dec 21, 2016*; 7:00 pm, FSN		at Syracuse	W 93–60	6–7	21 – Ponds	8 – Yakwe	9 – Lovett	Carrier Dome (18,363); Syracuse, NY
Big East regular season
Dec 29, 2016; 7:00 pm, FS1		No. 13 Butler	W 76–73	7–7 (1–0)	26 – Ponds	7 – Ponds	2 – Lovett	Carnesecca Arena (5,602); Queens, NY
Jan 1, 2017; 2:00 pm, FS1		at DePaul	W 79–73	8–7 (2–0)	22 – Lovett	9 – Williams	8 – Ellison	Allstate Arena (5,152); Rosemont, IL
Jan 4, 2017; 8:30 pm, FS1		No. 10 Creighton	L 72–85	8–8 (2–1)	23 – Lovett	7 – Ahmed	7 – Ellison	Carnesecca Arena (4,928); Queens, NY
Jan 7, 2017; 2:30 pm, FS1		at No. 16 Xavier	L 82–97	8–9 (2–2)	32 – Lovett	7 – Ponds	5 – Ponds	Cintas Center (10,474); Cincinnati, OH
Jan 9, 2017; 6:30 pm, FS1		at Georgetown	L 55–83	8–10 (2–3)	12 – Ponds	6 – Owens	2 – Tied	Verizon Center (5,158); Washington, D.C.
Jan 14, 2017; 12:00 pm, FS1		No. 3 Villanova	L 57–70	8–11 (2–4)	13 – Ponds	7 – Owens	4 – Lovett	Madison Square Garden (17,309); New York City, NY
Jan 16, 2017; 4:30 pm, FS1		DePaul; MLK Day Marathon	W 78–68	9–11 (3–4)	23 – Ellison	9 – Owens	6 – Ponds	Carnesecca Arena (5,602); Queens, NY
Jan 22, 2017; 12:00 pm, FS1		at Seton Hall	L 73–86	9–12 (3–5)	22 – Lovett	7 – Ahmed	4 – Lovett	Prudential Center (9,801); Newark, NJ
Jan 25, 2017; 6:30 pm, FS1		at Providence	W 91–86	10–12 (4–5)	26 – Lovett	6 – Ellison	3 – Tied	Dunkin' Donuts Center (10,314); Providence, RI
Jan 29, 2017; 6:00 pm, FS1		No. 24 Xavier	L 77–82	10–13 (4–6)	23 – Ponds	6 – Owens	6 – Ellison	Madison Square Garden (8,723); New York City, NY
Feb 1, 2017; 7:00 pm, FS2		Marquette	W 86–72	11–13 (5–6)	23 – Ahmed	11 – Owens	5 – Tied	Madison Square Garden (14,201); New York City, NY
Feb 4, 2017; 8:00 pm, CBSSN		at No. 4 Villanova	L 79–92	11–14 (5–7)	23 – Lovett	7 – Ahmed	6 – Lovett	Wells Fargo Center (18,562); Philadelphia, PA
Feb 11, 2017; 12:00 pm, CBSSN		Seton Hall	W 78–70	12–14 (6–7)	19 – LoVett	12 – Owens	6 – LoVett	Madison Square Garden (9,027); New York City, NY
Feb 15, 2017; 8:30 pm, FS1		at No. 24 Butler	L 86–110	12–15 (6–8)	20 – Mussini	6 – Owens	4 – Ponds	Hinkle Fieldhouse (7,719); Indianapolis, IN
Feb 21, 2017; 8:00 pm, FS1		at Marquette	L 71–93	12–16 (6–9)	21 – Ahmed	7 – Ponds	6 – Ponds	BMO Harris Bradley Center (13,370); Milwaukee, WI
Feb 25, 2017; 12:00 pm, FSN		Georgetown	W 86–80	13–16 (7–9)	24 – Ponds	6 – Tied	4 – Lovett	Madison Square Garden (11,277); New York City, NY
Feb 28, 2017; 8:00 pm, CBSSN		at Creighton	L 68–82	13–17 (7–10)	16 – Ponds	7 – Ahmed	3 – Tied	CenturyLink Center (17,006); Omaha, NE
Mar 4, 2017; 12:00 pm, FS2		Providence	L 75–86	13–18 (7–11)	29 – Ponds	7 – Tied	2 – Freudenberg	Madison Square Garden (8,826); New York City, NY
Big East tournament
Mar 8, 2017; 7:00 pm, FS1	(8)	vs. (9) Georgetown; First round	W 74–73	14–18	17 – Ponds	8 – Ellison	6 – Ellison	Madison Square Garden (14,803); New York, NY
Mar 9, 2017; 12:00 pm, FS1	(8)	vs. (1) No. 2 Villanova; Quarterfinals	L 67–108	14–19	12 – Tied	4 – Tied	5 – Lovett	Madison Square Garden (17,324); New York, NY
*Non-conference game. ^{#}Rankings from AP Poll. (#) Tournament seedings in parentheses. All times are in Eastern Time.
