= Elijah Clarance =

Swedish basketball player (born 1998)

Free agent
- Position: Shooting guard

Personal information
- Born: 3 July 1998 (age 28) Malmö, Sweden
- Listed height: 1.93 m (6 ft 4 in)
- Listed weight: 86 kg (190 lb)

Career information
- High school: St. Maria Goretti School (Hagerstown, Maryland)
- College: Illinois State (2017–2018)
- NBA draft: 2019: undrafted
- Playing career: 2018–present

Career history
- 2018–2020: Skyliners Frankfurt
- 2018–2019: →Skyliners Juniors
- 2019–2020: →Heroes Den Bosch
- 2020–2021: Vrijednosnice Osijek
- 2021–2022: Lovćen 1947
- 2022–2023: VEF Riga
- 2024: Paks Atomerőmű
- 2024: Dorados de Chihuahua
- 2024–2025: Kalev/Cramo
- 2025: Dorados de Chihuahua
- 2025–2026: Prishtina
- 2026: Saint-Quentin
- 2026–present: KL Titans

Career highlights
- Estonian Cup winner (2025); Montenegrin League MVP (2022); Montenegrin League Top Scorer (2022); Latvian League champion (2023); Latvian Cup winner (2023)

Elijah Marcus Clarance (born 3 July 1998) is a Swedish professional basketball player who most recently played for Saint-Quentin of the French LNB Élite. Standing at 1.93 m (6 ft 4 in), he plays as a shooting guard.

== Early career ==
Clarance played in the youth section of Swedish club Malbas.

== College career ==
Clarance committed to play college basketball for Illinois State on 14 September 2016. In the 2017–18 season, he made his debut with the team, but saw his season cut short by injury as he averaged 2.7 points and 1.1 rebounds in 21 games.

== Professional career ==
Clarance departed Illinois State to start his professional career with Fraport Skyliners of the Basketball Bundesliga.

On 9 August 2019, Clarance was sent on loan to New Heroes Den Bosch of the Dutch Basketball League (DBL). The 2019–20 season ended prematurely on 20 March because of the COVID-19 pandemic. In 20 games played, Clarance averaged 7.5 points, 2.3 rebounds, 2.8 assists and 1.3 steals per game.

On 1 January 2021, Clarance signed with Croatian club KK Vrijednosnice Osijek until the end of the season. In six games played, he averaged 14.2 points, 4.0 rebounds, 3.0 assists and 1.5 steals per game.

On 28 September 2021, Clarance signed with Lovćen 1947 of the ABA League Second Division and the Montenegrin League. He earned the Montenegrin League MVP and Top Scorer honors after averaging 19.9 points, 4.1 rebounds, 4.9 assists and 1.9 steals in 17 games played during the 2021–22 season.

On 23 December 2022, Clarance signed with VEF Rīga of the Latvian-Estonian League and the Basketball Champions League (BSL). With VEF, Clarance won the Latvian League and the Latvian Cup of the 2022–23 season. He left the team on 9 November 2023.

== National team career ==
With the Sweden Under-20 team, Clarance played at the 2018 FIBA Europe Under-20 Championship. Here, he was the leading scorer of the tournament after averaging 22.4 points per game.

Clarance made his debut for the senior national team at a 2024 FIBA Pre-Qualifying Olympic Qualifying Tournament.

== Personal life ==
Clarance is a Muslim. His mother is Swedish while his father was born in Trinidad. Clarance's older brother is former professional basketball player Bilal Clarance. At an early age, he met Nicolas Lunabba, whose influence guided Clarance, and who wrote the book Will You Care If I Die? about the experience.
