= Yovel Zoosman =

Israeli basketball player (born 1998)

Yovel Zoosman יובל זוסמן
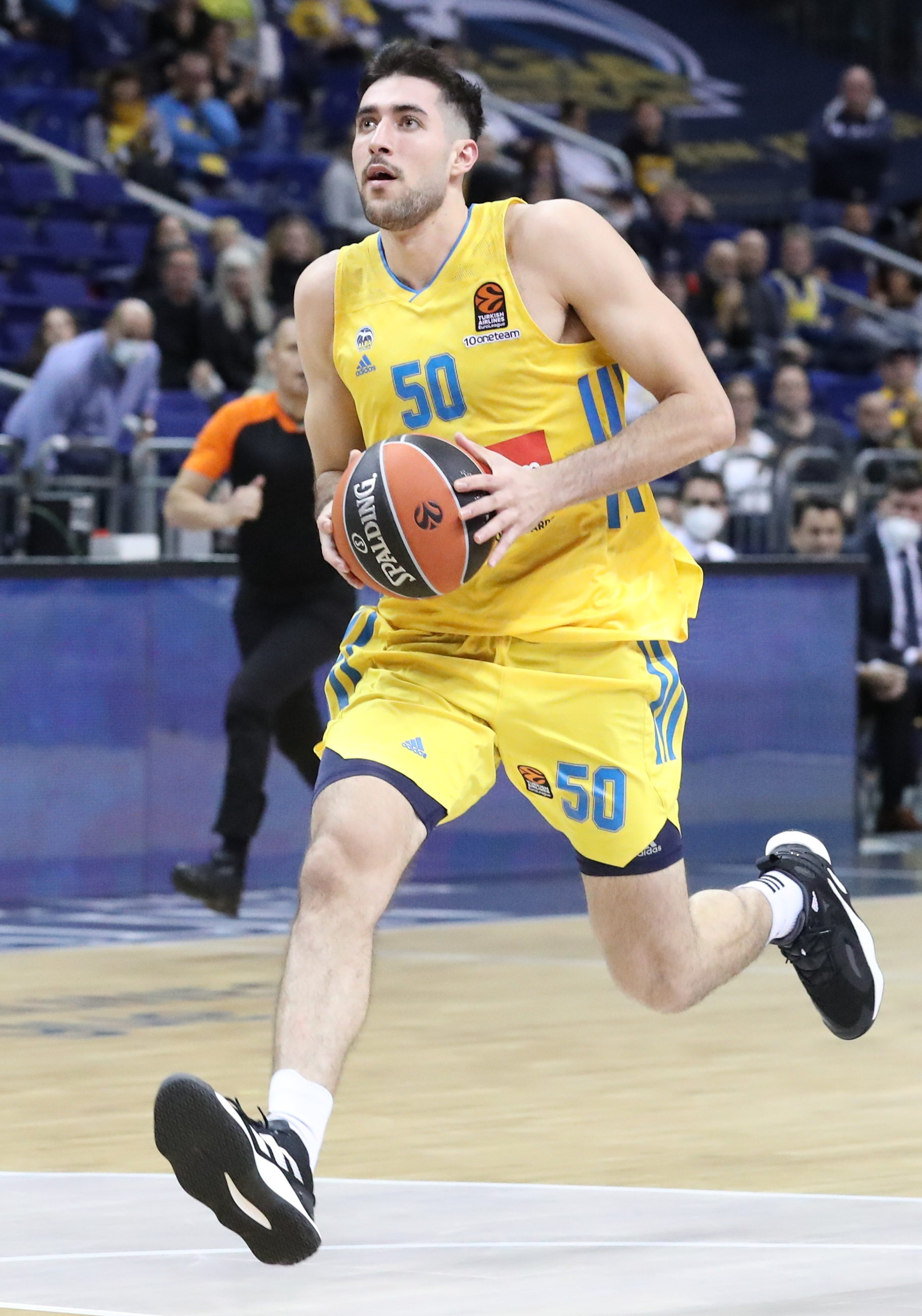
- Zoosman with Alba Berlin in 2021

No. 50 – Hapoel Jerusalem
- Position: Shooting guard / small forward
- League: Israeli Premier League

Personal information
- Born: May 12, 1998 (age 28) Kfar Saba, Israel
- Listed height: 2.01 m (6 ft 7 in)
- Listed weight: 90 kg (198 lb)

Career information
- NBA draft: 2019: undrafted
- Playing career: 2015–present

Career history
- 2015–2021: Maccabi Tel Aviv
- 2016–2017: →Maccabi Ra'anana
- 2021–2023: Alba Berlin
- 2023–present: Hapoel Jerusalem

Career highlights
- German League champion (2022); German Cup winner (2022); 2× Israeli League Defensive Player οf Year (2020, 2025); 4× Israeli Basketball Premier League champion (2018–2021); Israeli SuperCup winner (2025); 2× Israeli Basketball League Cup winner (2017, 2025); Israeli Basketball State Cup winner (2016); Israeli Basketball Premier League All-Star (2019); FIBA Europe Under-20 Championship MVP (2018); Israeli League Rising Star (2018); 3× Israeli Cup winner (2016, 2021, 2024)
Medals
Representing Israel
Men's basketball
FIBA Europe Under-20
Silver medal – second place	2017 Greece	Under-20
Gold medal – first place	2018 Germany	Under-20

Yovel Zoosman (Hebrew: יוֹבֵל זוסמן; born May 12, 1998) is an Israeli professional basketball player for Hapoel Jerusalem of the Israeli Basketball Premier League. Zoosman was named the FIBA Europe Under-20 Championship MVP in 2018. He was named the 2020 and 2025 Israeli Basketball Premier League Defensive Player of the Year.

== Early life and education ==
Yovel Zoosman was born in Kfar Saba, Israel, to a Jewish family. His grandmother Lila Zoosman (née Gestern) was born in Warsaw, Poland, and survived the Holocaust as a young girl. In 1943, she immigrated to Israel as part of the famous "Tehran Children" (Yaldei Tehran)—a group of Polish Jewish children who escaped Nazi-occupied Poland, hid in European monasteries and grew up in orphanages, and was eventually brought to Israel; her parents did not survive the Holocaust. He was raised in Netanya and played for Elitzur Netanya youth team.

He joined Wingate Institute and Maccabi Tel Aviv in his late teens. He was named Yovel because it is the Hebrew word for Jubilee, and he was born 50 years after the Israeli Declaration of Independence, hence why he wears the jersey number 50.

== Professional career ==
=== Maccabi Tel Aviv ===
In 2015, Zoosman started his professional career with Maccabi Tel Aviv of the Israeli Basketball Premier League, with whom at 17 years of age he played in 9 games in 2015–16. On October 18, 2015, Zoosman made his professional debut in an Israeli ISBL game, in an 85–70 win over Bnei Herzliya, recording two points off the bench.

=== Maccabi Ra'anana ===
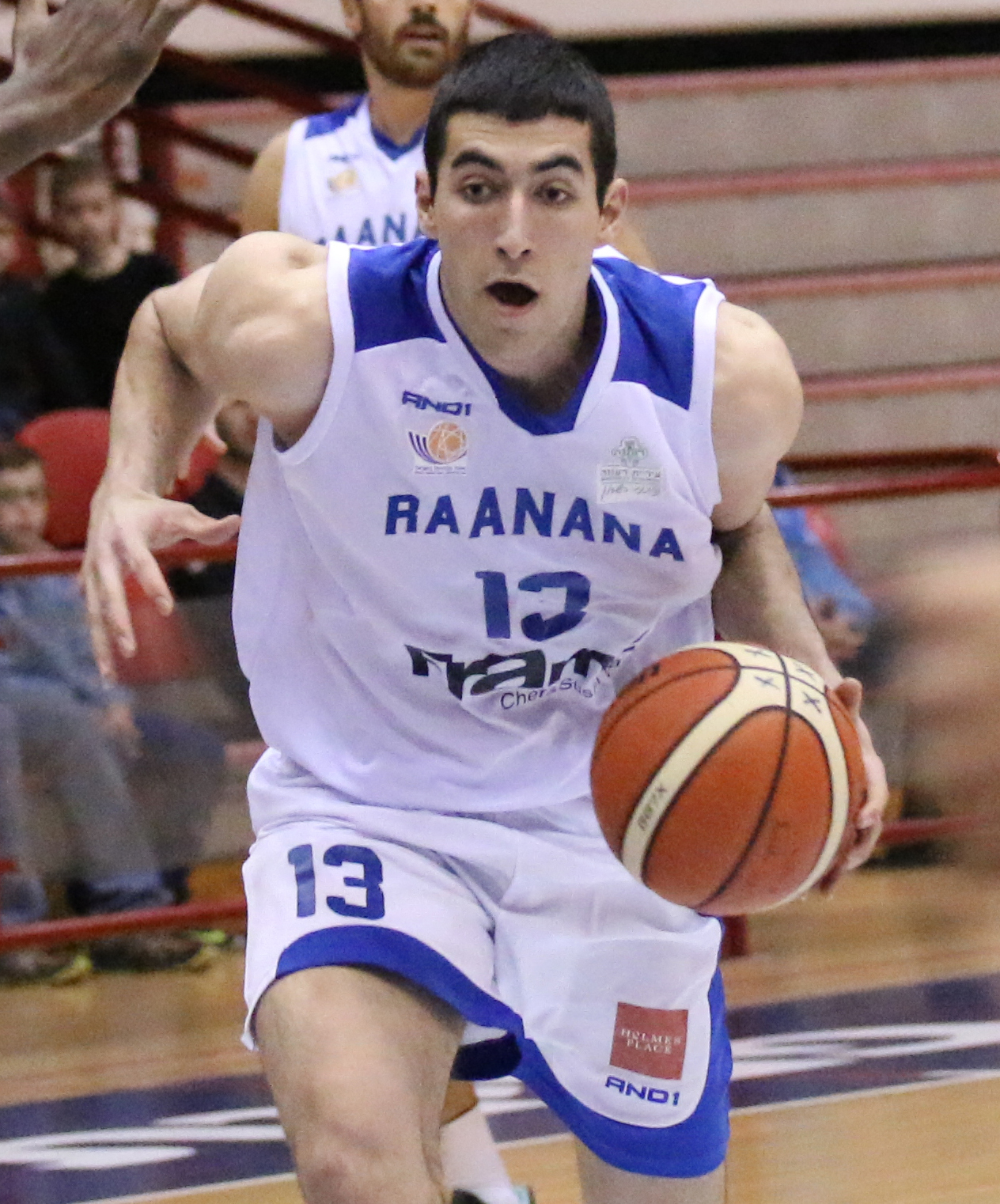
Zoosman with Maccabi Ra'anana in 2017.

On August 24, 2016, Zoosman was loaned to Maccabi Ra'anana of the Liga Leumit, the second-level league in Israel. In 28 games played with Ra'anana, he averaged 11.7 points, 3.6 rebounds, 2.3 assists and 1.8 steals per game, while shooting 41 percent from 3-point range. Zoosman helped Ra'anana reach the Liga Leumit playoffs as the first seed, but they eventually were eliminated by Maccabi Hod HaSharon in the quarterfinals.

=== Return to Maccabi Tel Aviv ===
On July 27, 2017, Zoosman signed a four-year contract extension with Maccabi Tel Aviv. Zoosman helped Maccabi win the 2017 Israeli League Cup and the 2018 Israeli League Championship.

In 2017-18 for the team, he played 50 games and averaged 12.1 minutes, 3.4 points, 1.2 rebounds, and 0.7 assists, while shooting 45.0% from the floor, and 85.7% from the free throw line. On June 8, 2018, Zoosman was named the 2018 Israeli League Rising Star.

On January 11, 2019, Zoosman recorded a EuroLeague career-high of 15 points, shooting 6-of-6 from the field, to go along with six rebounds and two steals, in a 93–76 win over CSKA Moscow. On January 31, 2019, Zoosman was named the Israeli Player of the Month, for games played in January. Zoosman helped Maccabi win the 2019 Israeli League Championship, winning his second straight Israeli League title in the process. In 2018-19 for the team, he played 71 games and averaged 20.3 minutes, 5.7 points, 2.9 rebounds,1.8 assists, and 1.0 steals per game while shooting 45.5% from the floor.

On June 27, 2019, Zoosman joined the Cleveland Cavaliers for the 2019 NBA Summer League. He played seven games, in which he averaged 17.0 minutes, 3.6 points, 2.4 rebounds, and 1.1 steals per game.

In 2019-20 for Maccabi Tel Aviv, he played 50 games and averaged 12.1 minutes, 3.4 points,1.2 rebounds, and 0.7 assists, while shooting 45.0% from the floor, and 85.7% from the free throw line. He was named the 2020 Israeli Basketball Premier League Defensive Player of the Year.

In 2020-21 for Maccabi Tel Aviv, he played 37 games and averaged 17.1 minutes, 4.8 rebounds, 1.4 assists, and 0.8 steals, while shooting 45.0% from the floor, and 85.7% from the free throw line.

=== Alba Berlin ===
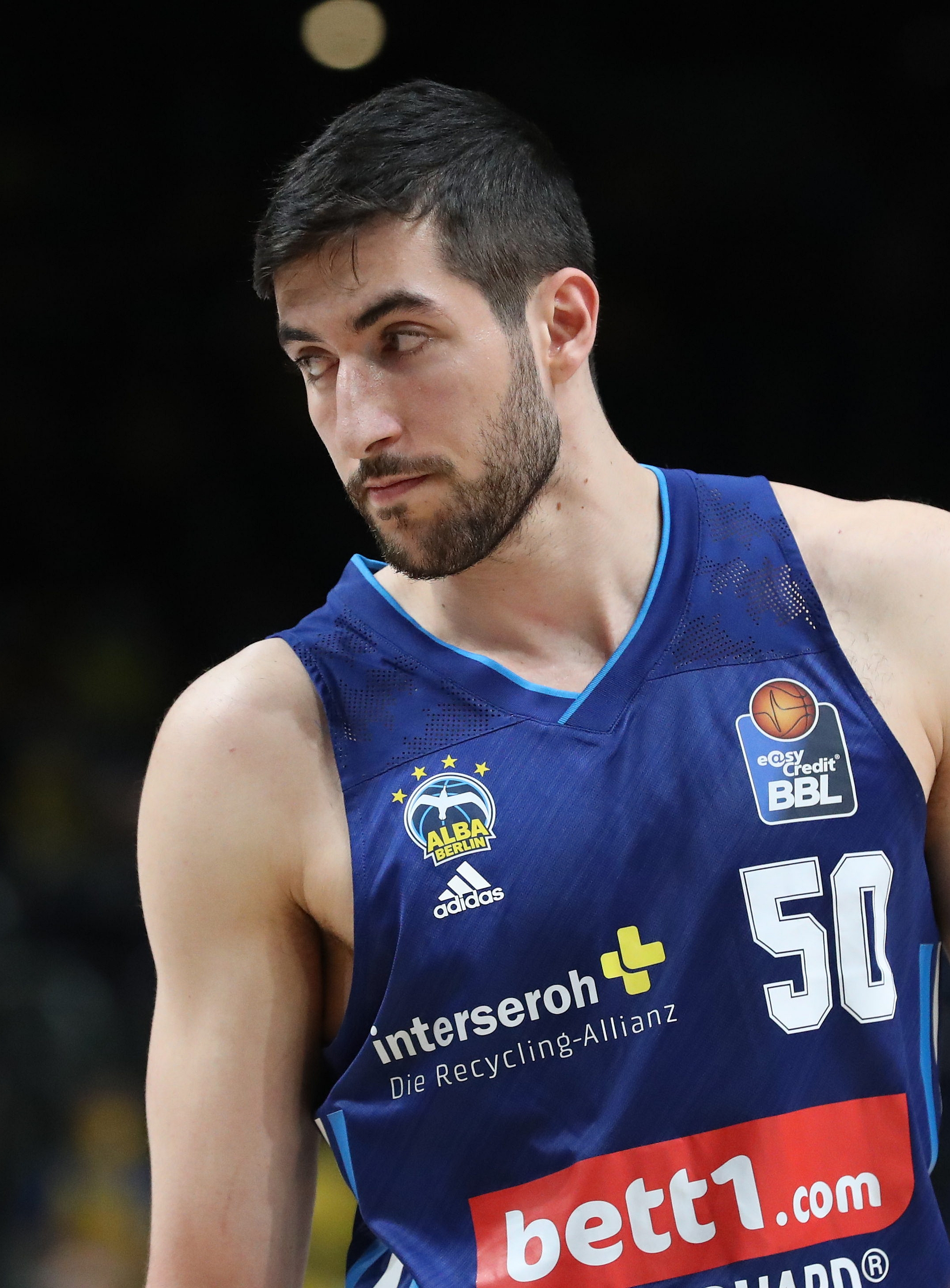
Zoosman with Alba Berlin in 2022

On August 6, 2021, he signed with Alba Berlin of the German Basketball Bundesliga (BBL). In 2021 in the BBL, he averaged 8.1 points, 3.1 rebounds, 1.7 assists, and 1.1 steals per game as he played 20.3 minutes per game.

In 2021-22 he played 72 games and averaged 20.8 minutes, 7.8 points, 3.1 rebounds, 1.4 assists, and 1.0 steals per game.

In 2022-23 he played 56 games and averaged 20.9 minutes, 7.7 points, 3.2 rebounds, 1.7 assists, and 1.2 steals per game, shooting 47.8% from the field, and 80.5% from the free throw line.

=== Hapoel Jerusalem ===
On July 9, 2023, he signed with Hapoel Jerusalem of the Israeli Basketball Premier League. In 2023-24 he played 49 games and averaged 21.3 minutes, 2.2 points, 4.1 minutes, 1.8 assists, and 1.2 steals per game.

In 2024-25 he played 54 games and averaged 26.8 minutes, 10.2 points, 4.1 rebounds, 2.2 assists, and 1.7 steals per game, while shooting 40.4% from three point range.

In 2025–26 with the team he played 37 games and averaged 26.1 minutes, 7.9 points, 4.1 rebounds, 1.5 assists, and 1.2 steals per game, while shooting 45.4% from the field and 42.6% from three point range.

== National team career ==
=== Israeli junior national team ===
Zoosman was a member of the Under-16, Under-18 and Under-20 Israeli national teams.

In the 2016 U18 Euro Championship A, he averaged 15.5 points (9th in the tournament), 8.8 rebounds (8th), and 3.8 steals per game.

In July 2017, Zoosman helped the Israeli Under-20 team reach the 2017 FIBA Europe Under-20 Championship Finals, where they eventually lost to Greece and ended up with a silver medal. Zoosman finished the tournament averaging 16.3 points (6th in the tournament), 5.7 rebounds, 1.9 assists, and 1.9 steals (5th) per game.

In July 2018, Zoosman led the Israeli Under-20 team to a gold medal at the 2018 FIBA Europe Under-20 Championship. He finished the tournament averaging 14.4 points, 4.7 rebounds, 3.6 assists, and 2.3 steals (3rd in the tournament) per game. Zoosman was named the Tournament MVP and also earned a spot in the All-Tournament Team, alongside his teammate Deni Avdija.

=== Israeli senior national team ===
Zoosman is a member of the senior Israeli national team. On February 23, 2018, Zoosman made his first appearance for the senior team in a 2019 FIBA Basketball World Cup qualification match against Great Britain.

== Career statistics ==
Legend
GP	Games played	GS	Games started	MPG	Minutes per game
FG%	Field-goal percentage	3P%	3-point field-goal percentage	FT%	Free-throw percentage
RPG	Rebounds per game	APG	Assists per game	SPG	Steals per game
BPG	Blocks per game	PPG	Points per game	PIR	Performance index rating
**Bold**	Career high

=== EuroLeague ===
Year	Team	GP	GS	MPG	FG%	3P%	FT%	RPG	APG	SPG	BPG	PPG	PIR
2015–16	Maccabi Tel Aviv	1	0	2.7	.000	.000	.000	.0	.0	.0	.0	.0	.0
2017–18	Maccabi Tel Aviv	14	4	8.0	.450	.364	**1.000**	.8	.6	.3	.1	1.8	1.9
2018–19	Maccabi Tel Aviv	30	2	14.7	**.459**	.375	.846	2.0	1.2	.7	**.2**	3.0	3.7
2019–20	Maccabi Tel Aviv	23	**16**	17.3	.438	.282	.840	2.7	1.7	**1.0**	.1	5.4	5.7
2020–21	Maccabi Tel Aviv	11	3	13.2	.333	.389	**1.000**	1.5	.6	.5	.0	2.6	1.6
2021–22	Alba Berlin	**31**	13	21	.443	**.444**	.694	**3.0**	1.2	.8	.1	**7.0**	6.9
2022–23	Alba Berlin	27	5	**21.6**	.445	.324	.880	2.9	**1.8**	**1.0**	**.2**	6.8	**7.2**
Career		137	43	17.1	.498	.368	.795	2.4	1.3	.8	.2	4.9	5.1

=== EuroCup ===
Year	Team	GP	GS	MPG	FG%	3P%	FT%	RPG	APG	SPG	BPG	PPG	PIR
2024–25	Hapoel Jerusalem	18	16	27.1	.441	.368	.759	3.8	1.9	1.7	.3	9.8	10.5
Career		18	16	27.1	.441	.368	.759	3.8	1.9	1.7	.3	9.8	10.5
