= Skyliners Juniors =

Fraport Skyliners Juniors
- Conference: South
- Leagues: ProB
- Founded: 2009; 16 years ago
- Arena: Fraport Arena
- Capacity: 5,002
- Location: Frankfurt, Germany
- Main sponsor: Fraport
- Affiliations: Skyliners Frankfurt; Eintracht Frankfurt
Home	Away

Skyliners Juniors, for sponsorship reasons Fraport Skyliners Juniors, is the reserve team of German basketball club Skyliners Frankfurt. The team is based in Frankfurt. It currently plays in the ProB, the third-tier national division. To develop its young players further, the Skyliners have merged some of their youth departments with Eintracht Frankfurt Basketball.

== Honours ==
ProB

- Runners-up (1) : 2015–16

== Season by season ==
Season	Tier	Division	Pos.	W–L
2014–15	3	ProB	16th	11–14
2015–16	3	ProB	2nd (Note: Resigned to promote to the ProA.)	21–10
2016–17	3	ProB	14th	11–14
2017–18	3	ProB	9th	14–11

== Players ==
=== Current roster ===
Fraport Skyliners Juniors roster
Players
Coaches

Pos.	No.	Nat.	Name
PG	1	(Sweden)	Elijah Clarance
C	8	(Germany)	Tobias Jahn
F	9	(Germany)	Richard Freudenberg
PG	12	(Germany)	Maximilian Begue
G	13	(Germany)	Garai Zeeb
C	14	(Germany)	Aaron Kayser
C	15	(Germany)	Armin Trtovac
G	20	(United Kingdom)	Jules Akodo
C	22	(Germany)	Cosmo Gruehn
SG	30	(United States)	JT Roach
F	31	(Germany)	Calvin Schaum
F	34	(Germany)	Konstantin Schubert

Head coach

(Germany) Sebastian Gleim

Assistant coach(es)

(Germany) Dominik Duclervil

- (Bosnia and Herzegovina) Miran Cumurija

Legend

- (C) Team captain
- Injured

- Roster
Updated: 16 October 2018

=== Notable players ===
Note: Flags indicate national team eligibility at FIBA-sanctioned events. Players may hold other non-FIBA nationalities not displayed.

Criteria

To appear in this section a player must have either:

- Set a club record or won an individual award while at the club
- Played at least one official international match for their national team at any time
- Played at least one official NBA match at any time.

- (United Kingdom) Jules Dang Akodo (2 seasons: 2014–15, 2017–18)
- (Germany) Richard Freudenberg (3 seasons: 2017–present)
- (Germany) Isaac Bonga (2 seasons: 2016–18)
