= Michael Brisker =

Israeli basketball player (born 1998)

Michael Brisker מייקל מור בריסקר
No. 5 – Maccabi Rishon LeZion
- Position: Shooting guard
- League: Israeli Basketball Premier League

Personal information
- Born: February 21, 1998 (age 28) Tel Aviv, Israel
- Listed height: 6 ft 2 in (1.88 m)
- Listed weight: 176 lb (80 kg)

Career information
- Playing career: 2016–present

Career history
- 2016–2019: Maccabi Ra'anana
- 2019–2020: Hapoel Tel Aviv
- 2020–2021: Maccabi Haifa
- 2021–2022: Hapoel Gilboa Galil
- 2022–2023: Ironi Kiryat Ata
- 2023–2024: Rouen Métropole
- 2024–2025: London Lions
- 2026–present: Maccabi Rishon LeZion

Michael Mor Brisker (Hebrew: מייקל מור בריסקר; born February 21, 1998) is an Israeli professional basketball player for Maccabi Rishon LeZion of the Israeli Basketball Premier League. He usually plays at the shooting guard position.

== Biography ==
Brisker is from Tel Aviv, Israel. His father is American-Israeli former basketball player Mark Brisker.

Brisker represented gold medal-winning Israel at the 2018 FIBA U20 European Championship in Germany. He averaged 15.3 points, 3.9 rebounds, 2.9 assists, and 1.9 steals per game.

On January 5, 2020, he signed with Maccabi Haifa in the Israeli Basketball Premier League. In 2020-21 he averaged 9.7 points and 1.6 assists per game, and had an .896 free throw percentage.

On August 8, 2021, he signed with Hapoel Gilboa Galil of the Israeli Basketball Premier League. In 2021-22 he averaged 11.6 points and 2.4 assists per game, and shot .426 from three-point range and .851 from the free-throw line. He was named 2021-2022 Israeli BSL Most Improved Player.

In the summer of 2022 he signed with Ironi Kiryat Ata of the Israeli Basketball Premier League. In 2022-23 he averaged 7.8 points and 2.2 assists per game, while shooting 84% from the free throw line.
