= Zufer Avdija =

Serbian-Israeli basketball player and coach

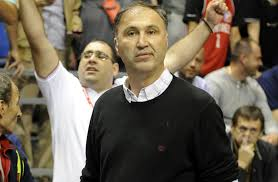
- Avdija in 2015

Bnei Herzliya
- Title: General manager
- League: Israeli Basketball Premier League

Personal information
- Born: 1 October 1959 (age 67) Priština, PR Serbia, FPR Yugoslavia
- Listed height: 2.03 m (6 ft 8 in)

Career information
- NBA draft: 1981: undrafted
- Playing career: 1977–1998
- Position: Power forward
- Number: 9, 12, 15

Career history
- 1977–1979: Elektrokosovo
- 1979–1989: Crvena zvezda
- 1989–1990: Gradine Pula
- 1990–1992: Ramat HaSharon
- 1992–1995: Hapoel Herzliya
- 1995–1996: Rishon LeZion
- 1996–1997: Hapoel Tel Aviv
- 1997–1998: Elitzur Bat Yam
Medals
Men's basketball
Representing Yugoslavia
FIBA World Championship
Bronze medal – third place	1982 Colombia	Team
Mediterranean Games
Gold medal – first place	1983 Morocco	Team
Universiade
Bronze medal – third place	1981 Bucharest	Univ. team

Zufer Avdija (Serbian: Зуфер Авдија, Hebrew: זופר אבדיה; born 1 October 1959) is a Serbian–Israeli professional basketball coach and former player who is the general manager and president of basketball operations for Bnei Herzliya of the Israeli Basketball Premier League. He played for Crvena zvezda in the Yugoslav Basketball League during the 1980s, and for Israeli clubs Ramat HaSharon, Rishon LeZion, Hapoel Tel Aviv, and Elitzur Bat Yam in the 1990s. He represented the Yugoslavia basketball team internationally. His son, Deni, is a current NBA player for the Portland Trail Blazers.

== Early life and career ==
Avdija was born in Priština, SAP Kosovo, PR Serbia, FPR Yugoslavia. He is of ethnic Gorani-Muslim descent (from Gora in southern Kosovo). When he was 15 he briefly played football as a goalkeeper for Ramiz Sadiku youth team in Pristina.

== Club career ==
A power forward, Avdija started his basketball career with his hometown team Elektrokosovo. In 1979, he joined the Belgrade-based team Crvena zvezda of the Yugoslav Basketball League, where he played during the 1980s. He was a team captain.

In the 1990s, Avdija played for Israeli clubs: Ramat HaSharon, Hapoel Herzliya, Rishon LeZion, Hapoel Tel Aviv, and Elitzur Bat Yam.

== International career ==
Avdija was a member of the Yugoslavia national team that won the bronze medal at the 1982 FIBA World Championship in Colombia, alongside teammates from Crvena zvezda, Rajko Žižić and Zoran Radović. He scored his tournament-high with 24 points in a 101–77 win over Uruguay. Over four tournament games, he averaged 8.8 points per game.

Additionally, Avdija also won the gold medal at the 1983 Mediterranean Games in Morocco. He played 50 games for the national team.

== Personal life ==
From his first marriage Avdija has 2 children, a daughter Iva and a son, Andrej.

He later married Sharon Artzi, an Israeli Jew from kibbutz Beit Zera, who is a former track and field athlete and basketball player. Their Israeli-born son, Deni Avdija (born 2001), is also a professional basketball player. Deni was drafted as the 9th overall pick by the Washington Wizards in the 2020 NBA draft and traded to the Portland Trail Blazers in July 2024. Deni Avdija also represents the Israel national team internationally.

== See also ==
- List of KK Crvena zvezda players with 100 games played
- Sports in Israel
- Basketball in Israel
