= Bennet Hundt =

German basketball player (born 1998)

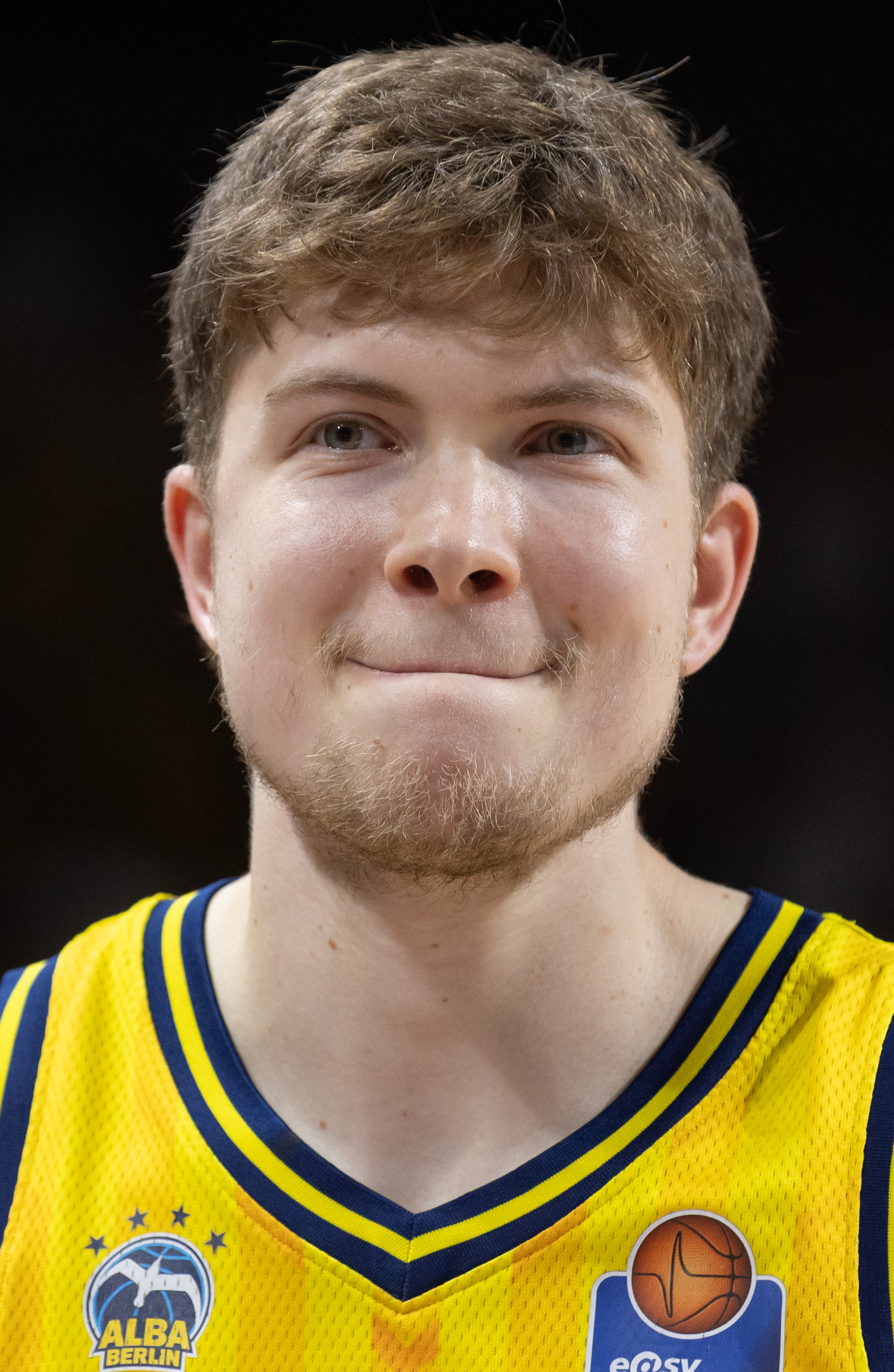
- Hundt with ALBA Berlin in 2026

No. 3 – Gladiators Trier
- Position: Point guard
- League: BBL

Personal information
- Born: 20 August 1998 (age 28) Berlin, Germany
- Listed height: 1.80 m (5 ft 11 in)
- Listed weight: 70 kg (154 lb)

Career information
- High school: Dalton (Dalton, Georgia)
- Playing career: 2016–present

Career history
- 2016–2019: Alba Berlin
- 2016–2019: →SSV Lokomotive Bernau
- 2019–2020: BG Göttingen
- 2020–2021: Brose Bamberg
- 2021–2023: Baskets Oldenburg
- 2023–2025: USC Heidelberg
- 2024–2025: Grupo Alega Cantabria CBT
- 2025–2026: Alba Berlin
- 2026–present: Gladiators Trier

Career highlights
- German Bundesliga Champion (2026); ProB Youngster of the Year (2019)
Medals
Men's basketball
Representing Germany
FIBA U20 European Championship
Bronze medal – third place	2018 Germany	Team

Bennet Hundt (born 20 August 1998) is a German professional basketball player for Gladiators Trier of the German Basketball Bundesliga (BBL). He has represented Germany in several youth international tournaments.

== Early career ==
Hundt grew up in Berlin. He began his youth career at TuS Lichterfelde, competing in the Jugend Basketball Bundesliga, the German under-16 league. In the 2014–15 season, he played for Dalton High School in Dalton, Georgia, where he was an exchange student. He lived with school board member Rick Fromm as his host family. After one year, Hundt joined Alba Berlin and split playing time between the main club in the Basketball Bundesliga (BBL) and the EuroCup, and its affiliated ProB team, SSV Lokomotive Bernau.

== Professional career ==
On 25 June 2019, Hundt signed a one-year contract with BG Göttingen of the BBL. On 6 June 2020, he scored a career-high 30 points, shooting 5-of-9 from three-point range, in an 89–78 win over Crailsheim Merlins in the preliminary round of the 2020 BBL Final Tournament.

On 10 July 2020, Hundt signed a one-year contract with Brose Bamberg of the BBL.

On 2 June 2021 he signed with EWE Baskets Oldenburg of the Basketball Bundesliga.

On 9 January 2023 he transferred to the MLP Academics Heidelberg of the Basketball Bundesliga.

On September 22, 2025, he signed with Alba Berlin of the Basketball Bundesliga (BBL).

On June 28 , 2026, he signed with Gladiators Trier of the German Basketball Bundesliga (BBL).

== National team career ==
Hundt represented Germany in several youth international tournaments. In 2014, he averaged 3.2 points and 1.7 assists per game at the U16 FIBA European Championships. He won a bronze medal at the 2018 FIBA U20 European Championship in Chemnitz. In February 2020, Hundt made his senior national team debut at the EuroBasket qualification stage.

== Personal life ==
Hundt's father Oliver and mother played basketball at the professional level in Germany. His older brother, Jannes, also plays the sport professionally.
