= Filip Stanić =

German basketball player (born 1998)

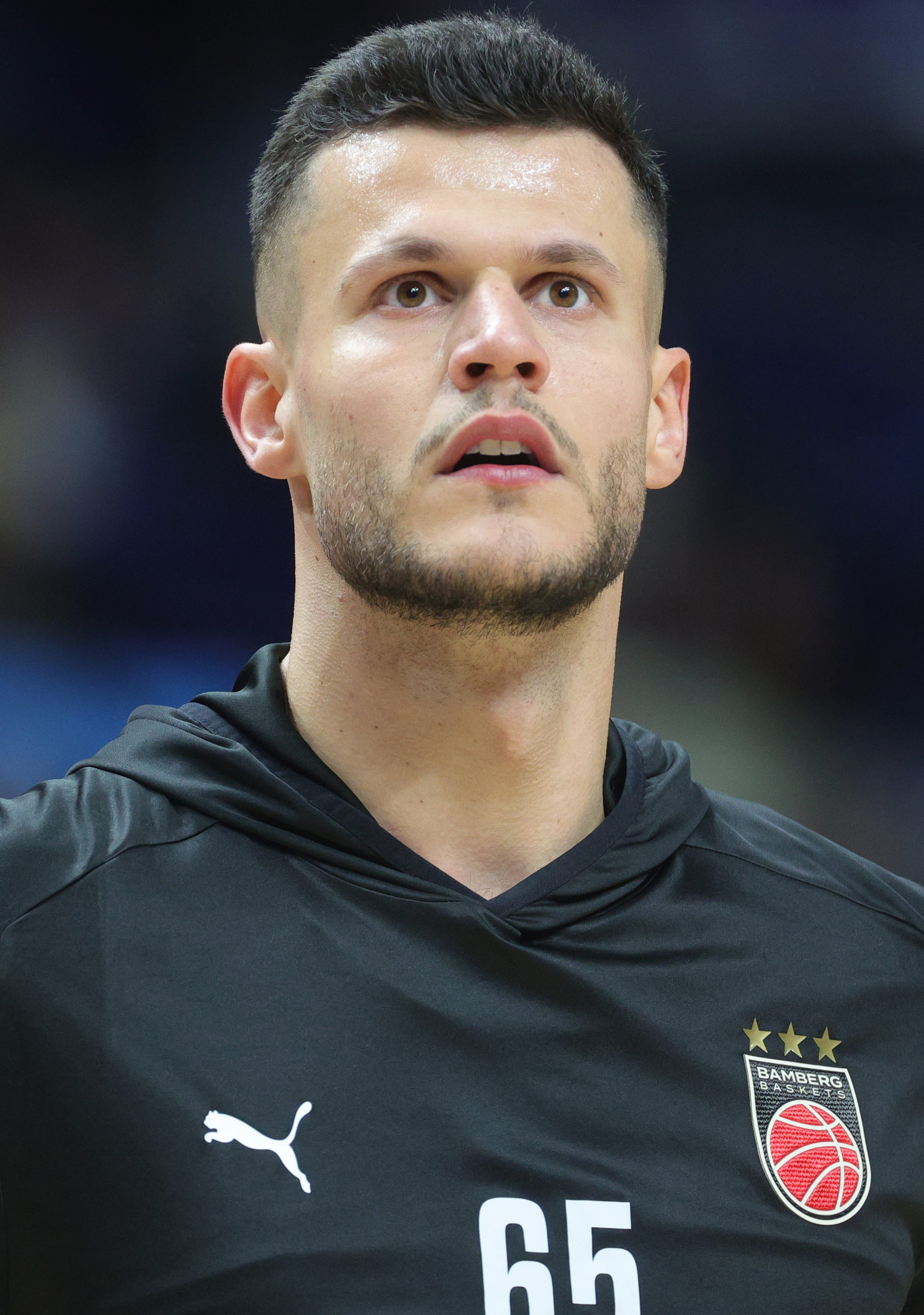
- Stanić with Bamberg Baskets in 2024

No. 65 – Ratiopharm Ulm
- Position: Center
- League: Basketball Bundesliga

Personal information
- Born: 14 January 1998 (age 28) Berlin, Germany
- Listed height: 2.08 m (6 ft 10 in)
- Listed weight: 118 kg (260 lb)

Career information
- Playing career: 2014–present

Career history
- 2015–2017: Alba Berlin
- 2017–2018: Rockets Gotha
- 2018–2020: Mega Bemax
- 2019: →OKK Beograd
- 2020: →EWE Baskets Oldenburg
- 2020–2021: Niners Chemnitz
- 2021–2023: Würzburg Baskets
- 2023–2025: Bamberg Baskets
- 2025–2026: EWE Baskets Oldenburg
- 2026–present: Ratiopharm Ulm
Medals
Men's basketball
Representing Germany
FIBA Europe Under-20 Championship
Bronze medal – third place	2018 Germany	U20 Team

Filip Stanić (born 14 January 1998) is a German professional basketball player for Ratiopharm Ulm of the Basketball Bundesliga (BBL).

== Professional career ==
In July 2018, Stanić signed a multi-year contract for the Mega Bemax of the Basketball League of Serbia. In April 2019, he was loaned to OKK Beograd.

In July 2020, Stanić signed with Niners Chemnitz, newcomers in the Basketball Bundesliga. He played only 13 games for Chemnitz in 2020-21 and was considerably slowed down by injuries. Stanić signed a contract with fellow Bundesliga outfit S.Oliver Würzburg in May 2021.

On June 27, 2023, he signed with Brose Bamberg of the Basketball Bundesliga (BBL).

On June 20, 2025, he signed with EWE Baskets Oldenburg in the Basketball Bundesliga (BBL) for a second stint.

== National team career ==
Stanić was a member of the Germany national under-20 basketball team that won the bronze medal at the 2018 FIBA Europe Under-20 Championship. Over seven tournament games, he averaged 13.6 points, 7.1 rebounds and 1.3 assists per game. At the tournament's end, he got selected to All-Tournament Team.
