= Thibault Desseignet =

French basketball player

No. 20 – Hermine Nantes Basket
- Position: Point guard
- League: LNB Pro B

Personal information
- Born: 16 September 1998 (age 28) Roanne, France
- Listed height: 5 ft 10 in (1.78 m)
- Listed weight: 175 lb (79 kg)

Career information
- Playing career: 2015–present

Career history
- 2015–2018: JL Bourg
- 2018–present: Hermine Nantes Basket

Career highlights
- Pro B champion (2017); Pro B Leaders Cup winner (2020)
Medals
Men's basketball
Representing France
FIBA Europe Under-18 Championship
Gold medal – first place	2016 Turkey

Thibault Desseignet (born 16 September 1998) is a French professional basketball player for Nantes of LNB Pro B.

He joined JL Bourg in 2015. Desseignet injured his shoulder in December 2017. In April 2018 he sprained his ankle and missed some time.
