= Görkem Doğan =

Turkish basketball player (born 1998)

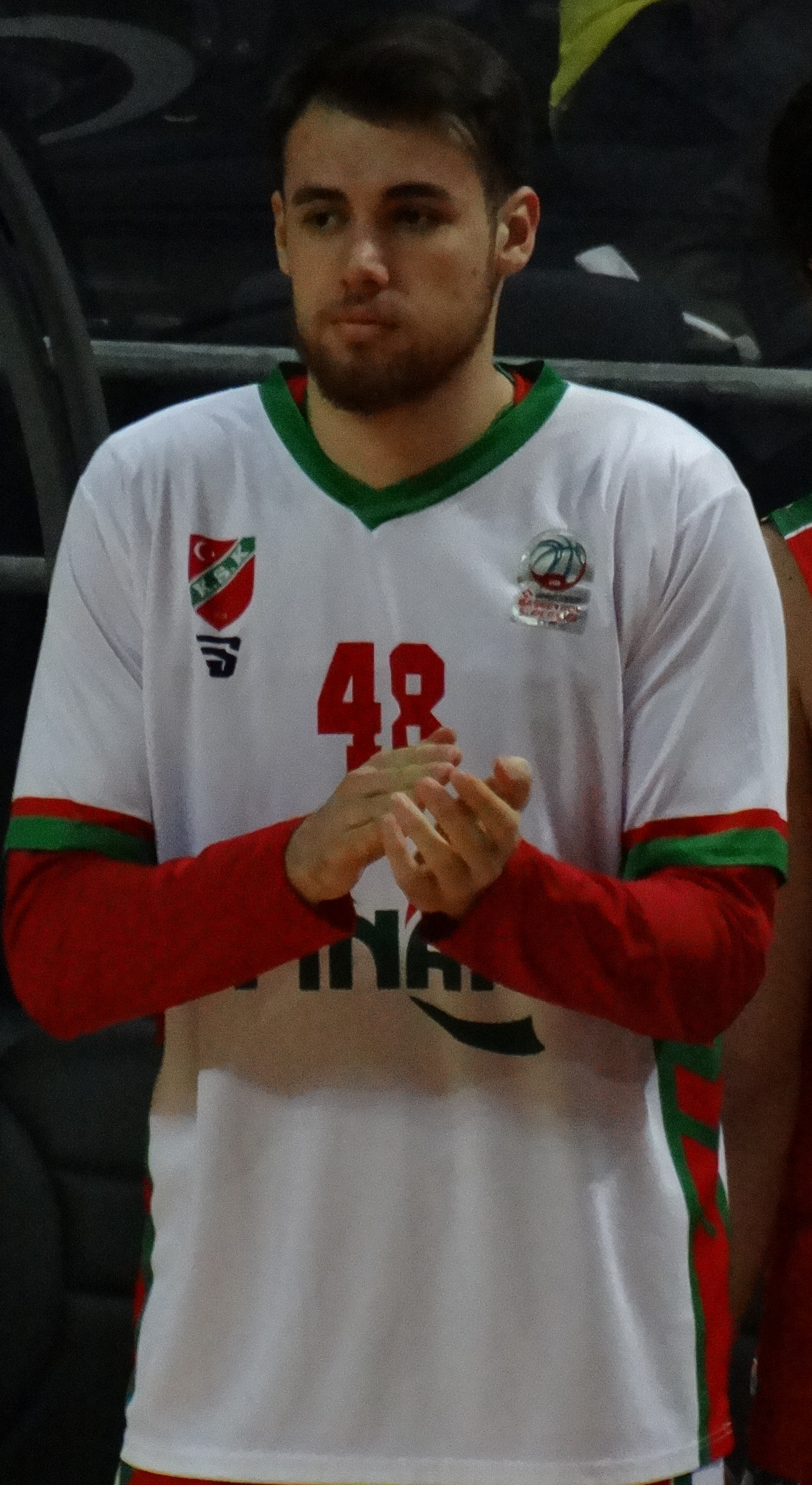

Esenler Erokspor
- Position: Center
- League: TBL

Personal information
- Born: May 11, 1998 (age 28) Bodrum, Muğla, Turkey
- Listed height: 2.08 m (6 ft 10 in)
- Listed weight: 104 kg (229 lb)

Career information
- Playing career: 2016–present

Career history
- 2016–2020: Pınar Karşıyaka
- 2020–2022: Darüşşafaka
- 2022–2023: Bahçeşehir Koleji
- 2023: Merkezefendi Bld. Denizli Basket
- 2023–present: Esenler Erokspor

Görkem Doğan (born May 11, 1998) is a Turkish professional basketball player who plays as a center for Esenler Erokspor of the Türkiye Basketbol Ligi (TBL).

== Professional career ==
=== Pınar Karşıyaka (2016–2020) ===
Görkem Doğan started his professional career at Pınar Karşıyaka in 2016–17 season and stayed with this club for four seasons.

=== Darüşşafaka (2020–2022) ===
On September 28, 2020, he has signed with Darüşşafaka of the Basketbol Süper Ligi (BSL).

=== Bahçeşehir Koleji (2022–2023) ===
On June 27, 2022, he has signed with Bahçeşehir Koleji of the Basketbol Süper Ligi (BSL).

=== Merkezefendi Bld. Denizli Basket (2023) ===
On July 4, 2023, he signed with Merkezefendi Bld. Denizli Basket of the Basketbol Süper Ligi (BSL).

=== Esenler Erokspor (2023–present) ===
On November 2, 2023, he signed with Esenler Erokspor of the Türkiye Basketbol Ligi (TBL).
