= Richard Freudenberg (basketball) =

German basketball player (born 1998)

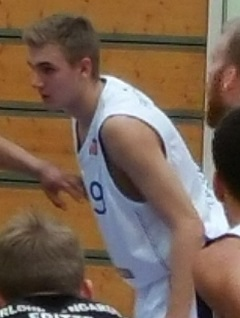
- Freudenberg in 2017.

Personal information
- Born: August 31, 1998 (age 28) Heidelberg, Germany
- Listed height: 6 ft 9 in (2.06 m)
- Listed weight: 210 lb (95 kg)

Career information
- College: St. John's (2016–2017)
- NBA draft: 2018: undrafted
- Playing career: 2015–2022
- Position: Small forward

Career history
- 2015–2016: Bayern Munich
- 2017–2022: Skyliners Frankfurt
- 2017–2020: →Skyliners Juniors
Medals
Men's basketball
Representing Germany
Albert Schweitzer Tournament
Gold medal – first place	2016 Germany	National Team

Richard Nikolaus Freudenberg (born August 31, 1998) is a former German professional basketball player. Standing 6 ft 9 in (2.06 m) tall, he played at the small forward position.

== Playing career ==
=== Early years at Bayern Munich ===
Freudenberg is a product of Bayern Munich, where he came through the youth ranks. Richard began to make noise on the national scene in Germany during the 2012–13 season, when he averaged 21.7 points, 9.0 rebounds, 2.3 steals and 1.7 assists in twelve games of the JBBL, the German 16 under Bundesliga.

In the 2013–14 season, he took his first steps in senior basketball, playing for Bayern Munich's development squad in the fourth-tier of German basketball (Regionalliga), while continuing to be a dominant player at the youth level: He played both for Bayern's under 16 (JBBL) and under 19 (NBBL) squad that season, averaging 20.9 points and 10.3 rebounds in JBBL play, while producing 10.1 points and 3.2 rebounds in the NBBL.

In 2014–15, Freudenberg was instrumental in leading Bayern's under 19 team to the German NBBL title. He turned in averages of 14.8 points and 6.6 rebounds in 17 games that season, while earning NBBL Final Four MVP honors. He also continued to hone his skills going up against grown men with the club's development team in Germany's fourth division, helping the Bayern squad to a third-place finish in the Regionalliga South-East, scoring 7.7 points a game in 17 contests.

He earned a spot on the roster of Bayern's men's team for the 2015–16 campaign, making his debut in Germany's top-flight Basketball Bundesliga (BBL) on October 2, 2015, against Oldenburg. While practicing with Bayern's Bundesliga team, Freudenberg primarily kept playing for the club's men's development team and the under 19 squad.

In February 2016, he attended the "Basketball Without Borders Global Camp" in Toronto, Canada.

=== College basketball ===
In February 2016, it was announced that Freudenberg has verbally committed to St. John's University. He had also considered Vanderbilt, Texas, Gonzaga and Boston College. He averaged 1.3 points as well as 1.3 rebounds a contest (26 games) as a freshman and decided to leave college after one year to turn pro.

=== Professional basketball ===
Shortly after leaving college, Freudenberg signed with German Basketball Bundesliga side Skyliners Frankfurt.

On June 13, 2022, he announced his retirement from professional basketball to focus on his Business administration education, after not having appeared in any Bundesliga game since 2020 because of a foot injury.

== International career ==
In 2013, he was selected to play for the German under 16 national team, and attended the under 16 European Championships in Ukraine that year, averaging 6.4 points a game (9 contests).

He also represented Germany at the 2015 under 18 European Championships in Greece, seeing action in nine contests, while tallying 5.0 points and 2.8 rebounds per outing.

Freudenberg won gold at the 2016 Albert-Schweitzer-Tournament with the German under 18 national team and was also named to the All-Tournament Team. He averaged 5.4 points a contest at the 2017 FIBA Under-19 Basketball World Cup. In July 2018, he won bronze at the Under-20 European Championship.
