= Nils Haßfurther =

German basketball player (born 1999)

Retired
- Position: Point guard

Personal information
- Born: 18 May 1999 (age 27) Bamberg, Germany
- Listed height: 1.87 m (6 ft 2 in)

Career information
- NBA draft: 2021: undrafted
- Playing career: 2014–present

Career history
- 2016–2019: Nürnberg Falcons BC
- 2019–2021: s.Oliver Würzburg

Nils Haßfurther (born 18 May 1999) is a German retired professional basketball player who last played for s.Oliver Würzburg.

== Early life ==
Nils Haßfurther was born in Bamberg.

== Professional career ==
In the 2018–19 ProA season, Haßfurther was a key player for the vice Champion Nürnberg Falcons BC who earned the rights to promote to the Basketball Bundesliga. There, he averaged 7.5 points and 3.2 assists per game while shooting 46% from the three-point line.

In Oktober 2019, Haßfurther signed with s.Oliver Würzburg, under head coach Denis Wucherer, for two years. In Würzburg, Haßfurther has received personal training by Holger Geschwindner, the mentor of Dirk Nowitzki.

== Player profile ==
Würzburg's coach Wucherer stated that he values Haßfurther's shooting ability.

== German national team ==
Haßfurther was a member of the German national under-16 team and the German national under-18 team.
