= Krešimir Ljubičić =

Croatian basketball player

Free Agent
- Position: Center

Personal information
- Born: July 11, 1998 (age 28) Zagreb, Croatia
- Listed height: 6 ft 11 in (2.11 m)

Career information
- NBA draft: 2020: undrafted
- Playing career: 2016–present

Career history
- 2016–2020: Cibona
- 2020–2021: Gorica
- 2021–2022: Saint-Quentin
- 2022–2023: Cibona
- 2023–2025: Split
- 2025–2026: Arka Gdynia

Career highlights
- Croatian League champion (2019); 2× Croatian Cup winner (2023, 2025)
Medals
Men's basketball
Representing Croatia
FIBA Europe Under-20 Championship Division B
Silver medal – second place	2017 Romania	National U-20 Team
FIBA Europe Under-20 Championship
Silver medal – second place	2018 Germany	National U-20 Team

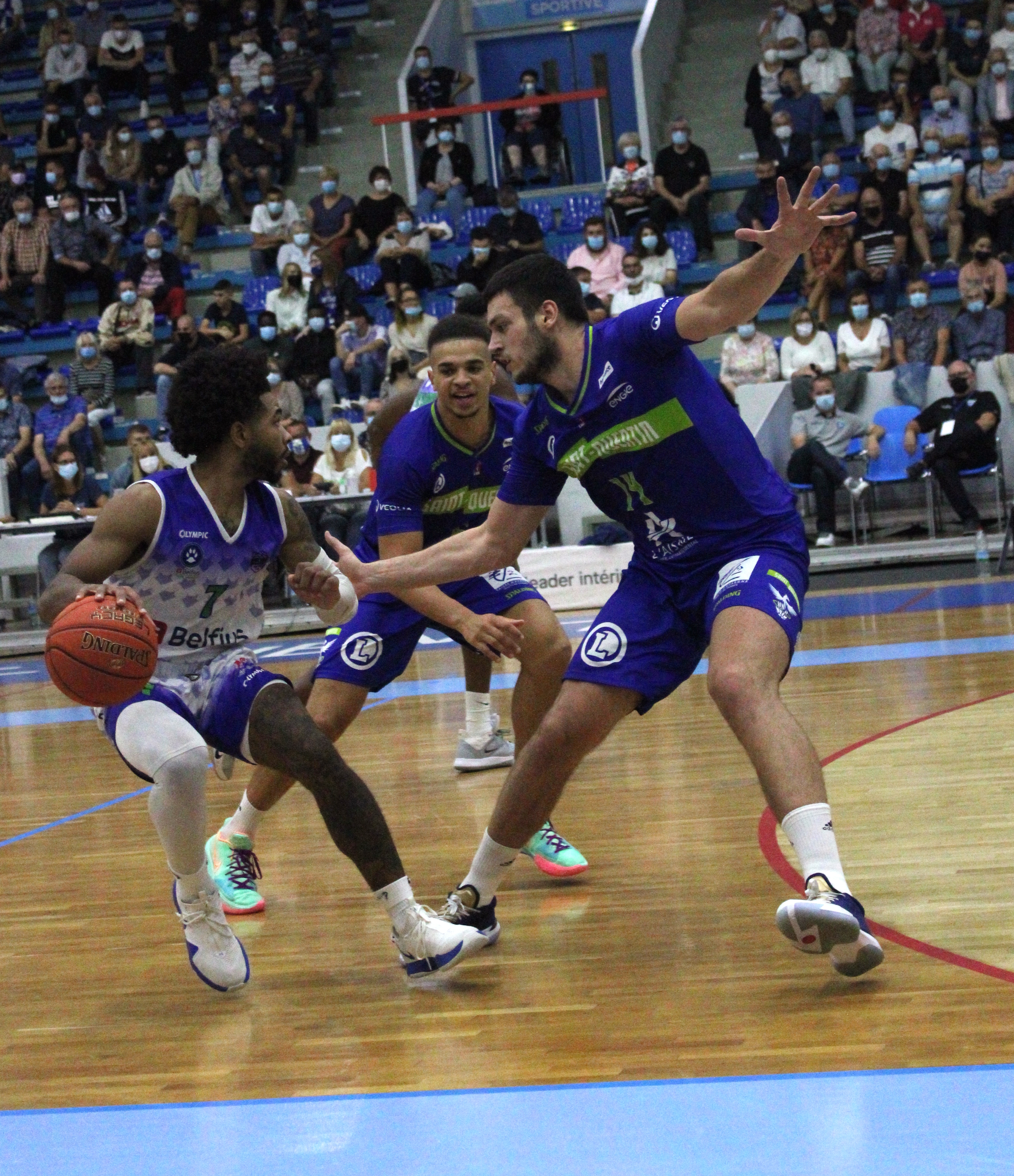
Ljubicic in September 2021

Krešimir Ljubičić (born July 11, 1998) is a Croatian professional basketball player who last played for Arka Gdynia of the Polish Basketball League (PLK).
