= Beit Zera =

Kibbutz in northern Israel

Beit Zera: בית זרע (Hebrew)
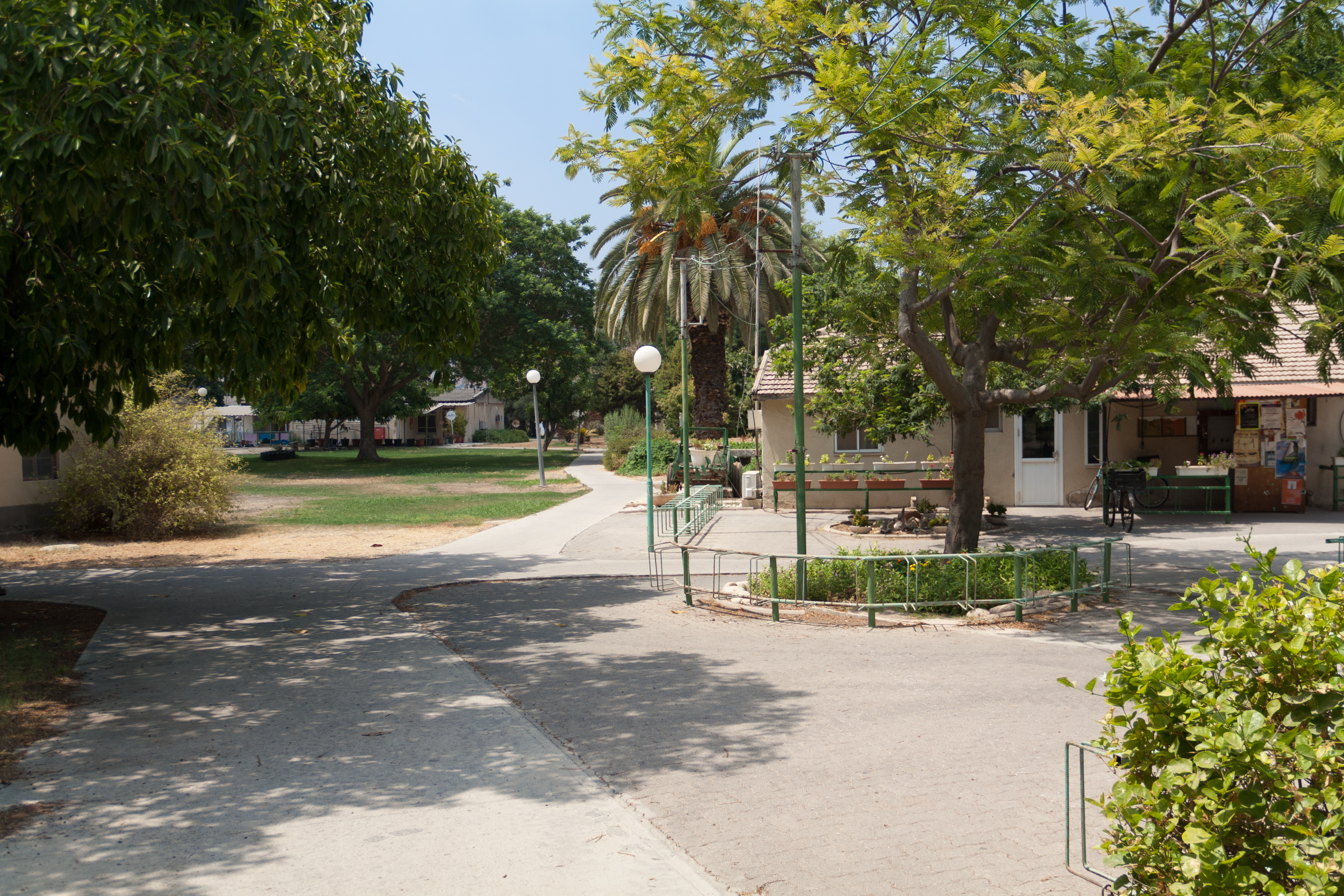
- Etymology: House of Seed
- Location within Northeast Israel Location within Israel
- Coordinates: 32°41′20″N 35°34′24″E
- Country: Israel
- District: Northern
- Subdistrict: Kinneret
- Council: Emek HaYarden
- Affiliation: Kibbutz Movement
- Founded: September 1927
- Founder: Austrian-Jewish and German-Jewish immigrants
- Population (2024): 876
- Website: www.betzera.org.il

Beit Zera (Hebrew: בית זרע, lit. 'House of Seed') is a kibbutz in northern Israel. Located on the southern shore of the Sea of Galilee, it falls under the jurisdiction of Emek HaYarden Regional Council. As of 2024 it had a population of 876.

== History ==
In 1920, pioneers from Degania Alef founded kibbutz Degania Gimel south of Degania Bet at the site of the future kibbutz Beit Zera. Separately, another group of Jewish pioneers from Germany and Austria, who belonged to the Blau-Weiss movement and had prepared for their task at the Markenhof Farm near Freiburg im Breisgau, was established in 1921 in Petah Tikva.

In 1922, Degania Gimel was disbanded and its residents moved to the Jezreel Valley where they founded kibbutz Ginegar. In 1926, the Markenhof group moved to the Galilee and settled at Umm Juni, the place where Degania Alef once started from at the end of 1909. The community founded in 1926 was a kvutza, was first known as Markenhof or Kfar Gun, was financed at least in part by Keren Hayesod, was allotted 1,500 dunam of land, and had (either in 1926 or in 1933) 38 inhabitants.

In 1927, the huts at Umm Juni were destroyed by an earthquake and the group moved in September 1927 to the old Degania Gimel site, where they established a new, permanent kibbutz settlement which they called Kfar Nathan.

In 1947, Beit Zera had a population of 500. During the 1948 Arab–Israeli war, the villagers continued their agricultural work despite shelling from Syrian and Iraqi troops as well as from the Arab Legion.

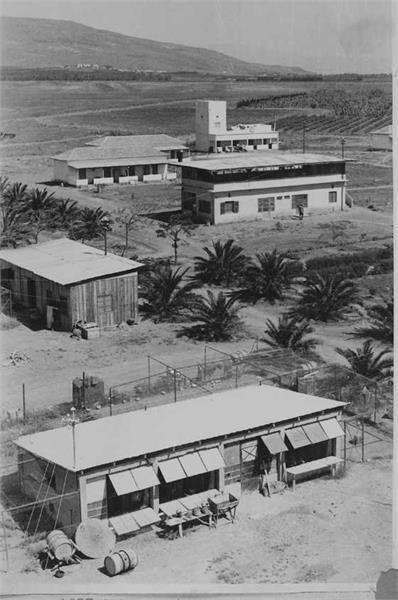
Beit Zera 1937

== Economy ==
In addition to agriculture, Beit Zera owns Arkal, a plastic products factory.

== Notable people ==
- Deni Avdija (born 2001 in Beit Zera), NBA professional basketball player
