= Deni Avdija =

Israeli basketball player (born 2001)

- Deni Avdija playing for the Portland Trail Blazers in 2026

No. 8 – Portland Trail Blazers
- Position: Small forward
- League: NBA

Personal information
- Born: 3 January 2001 (age 25) Beit Zera, Israel
- Listed height: 6 ft 8 in (2.03 m)
- Listed weight: 228 lb (103 kg)

Career information
- NBA draft: 2020: 1st round, 9th overall pick
- Drafted by: Washington Wizards
- Playing career: 2017–present

Career history
- 2017–2020: Maccabi Tel Aviv
- 2020–2024: Washington Wizards
- 2024–present: Portland Trail Blazers

Career highlights
- NBA All-Star (2026); 3× Israeli League champion (2018–2020); Israeli League MVP (2020); All-Israeli League First Team (2020); EuroLeague Magic Moment (2020); FIBA Europe Under-20 Championship MVP (2019); 2× Basketball Without Borders MVP (2018, 2019); Israeli League Cup winner (2017)
- Stats at NBA.com
- Stats at Basketball Reference
Medals
Men's basketball
Representing Israel
FIBA U20 European Championship
Gold medal – first place	2018 Germany	Team
Gold medal – first place	2019 Israel	Team

Deni Avdija (/ˈdɛni əvˈdiːjə/ DEN-ee av-DEE-ya; Hebrew: דֶנִי אָבְדִיָה, Serbian Cyrillic: Дени Авдија; born 3 January 2001) is an Israeli professional basketball player for the Portland Trail Blazers of the National Basketball Association (NBA). He plays the small forward position, and is nicknamed "Turbo" for his fast-paced and aggressive playing style. Prior to the NBA, he played for Maccabi Tel Aviv in Israel. From 2020 to 2024, he played for the Washington Wizards. In 2024, Avdija was traded to the Portland Trail Blazers.

The son of former Serbian-Gorani basketball player Zufer Avdija, he started playing basketball in the fourth grade for his hometown club Bnei Herzliya Basket, and then in 2013 for Maccabi Tel Aviv. He excelled as a youth player. He debuted for their senior team in 2017, at age 16, becoming the youngest player in club history. Two years later, he became the youngest player to ever win the Israeli Basketball Premier League MVP award, and led his team to the Israeli Basketball Premier League championship. He deferred his mandatory Israel Defense Forces (IDF) service until 2020, when NBA games were suspended during the COVID-19 pandemic.

In 2020, Avdija declared for the NBA draft and was drafted by the Washington Wizards with the 9th overall pick. He is also a member of the Israeli senior national basketball team. He has won two gold medals for Israel at the youth level, including at the 2019 FIBA U20 European Championship, where he was named tournament's most valuable player.

== Early life and youth career ==
Avdija was born in kibbutz Beit Zera in Israel. His mother, Sharon Artzi, an Israeli Jew from the kibbutz, is a former track and field and basketball player. His father, Zufer Avdija, is an Israeli citizen with a Muslim-Gorani heritage who played basketball for the Yugoslavia national team before moving to Israel to play for Israeli teams.

Deni Avdija played association football until he entered fourth grade, when his friend and teammate Itamar Vule convinced him to try basketball because of his height. He started focusing more on basketball. In 2013, he joined the youth ranks of Maccabi Tel Aviv, where he played under the coach Shai Omer. From 2017 to 2019, Avdija led Maccabi Tel Aviv to three consecutive Israeli youth state championships. In August 2018, he participated in Basketball Without Borders Europe in Belgrade, where he was named camp MVP. In December 2018 he led his Tichon Hadash high school team to win the Israeli championship for high schools.

Avdija initially competed at the youth level for Bnei Herzliya, and in January 2019, Avdija played for Maccabi Tel Aviv's U18 team at the Adidas Next Generation Tournament (ANGT) in Munich. He was selected to the all-tournament team after leading the event with 24.3 points, 6 assists, and 3.8 steals per game and a Performance Index Rating (PIR) of 31.5. Avdija also ranked second among all players with 11 rebounds per game, while helping his team finish in second place. In February 2019, at the NBA All-Star Weekend in Charlotte, North Carolina, Avdija was named MVP of the Basketball Without Borders Global Camp. In May, he joined Maccabi Tel Aviv's U18 team for the ANGT Finals. He collected all-tournament team honours after leading the event with 24.7 points and 12 rebounds per game with a PIR of 29.7, while ranking second with 6.7 assists per game.

== Professional career ==
=== Maccabi Tel Aviv (2017–2020) ===
On 5 November 2017, Avdija started his professional career with Israeli club Maccabi Tel Aviv, signing a six-year deal with the club. On 19 November, he made his professional debut in the 2017–18 Israeli Basketball Premier League, playing three minutes against Ironi Nes Ziona. At 16 years and 320 days of age, he became the youngest player to ever play for his club's senior team. Avdija made his EuroLeague debut on 22 November 2018, at the age of 17, in a 74–70 loss to Fenerbahçe. He scored two points in three minutes of playing time.

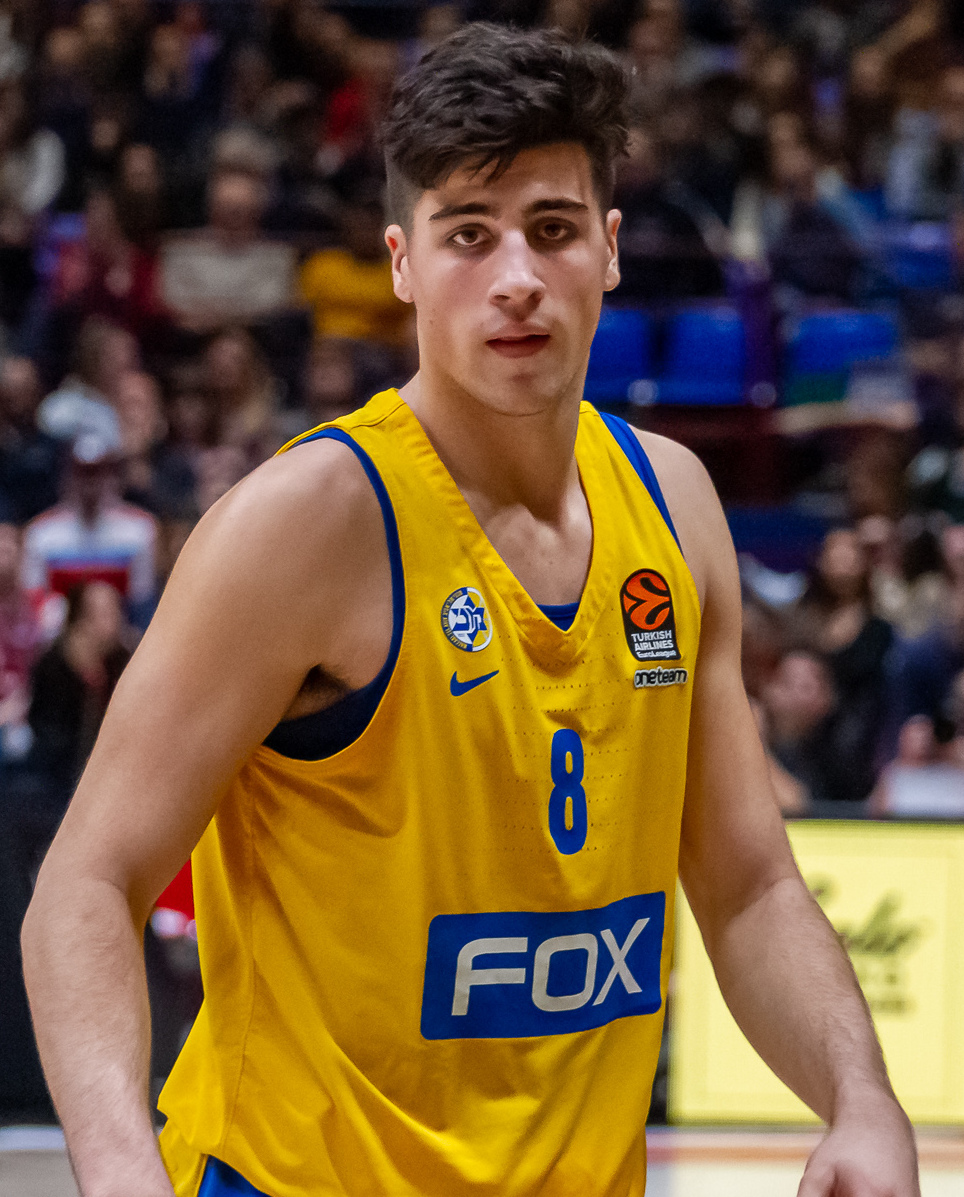
Avdija with Maccabi Tel Aviv in 2019

On 24 October 2019, at the age of 18, Avdija made his first start in the EuroLeague, recording six points and three rebounds in 16 minutes in a 76–63 victory over Valencia. On 11 January 2020, Avdija recorded a then career-high of 22 points, shooting 9-of-15 from the field, with five assists in a 94–83 win over Hapoel Holon. On 31 January, Avdija was named Israeli Player of the Month in the Israeli Basketball Premier League after averaging 14.5 points, 5.3 rebounds, and 2.5 assists per game, with an 18.3 PIR, in four games played that month. On 1 February, Avdija established a new career-high of 26 points, shooting 9-of-12 from the field, and grabbed six rebounds in an 86–81 loss to Hapoel Eilat. Six days later, he scored 13 points, including eight in the second quarter, in a 78–77 victory over Fenerbahçe. His dunk over Luigi Datome during the game would be named EuroLeague Magic Moment of the Season in July 2020. On 16 April, Avdija declared for the 2020 NBA draft.

Avdija's season was suspended for about three months due to the COVID-19 pandemic. He returned to action on 21 June, recording 23 points, seven rebounds, and five assists in 24 minutes in a 114–82 win over Maccabi Ashdod. On 23 July, he scored 22 points, including 10 in the fourth quarter, and grabbed 10 rebounds in an 83–68 win over Hapoel Tel Aviv, helping Maccabi Tel Aviv advance to the Israeli Basketball Premier League Final Four. In the Final on 28 July, Avdija recorded five points, seven rebounds, four assists, and two steals to help Maccabi Tel Aviv defeat Maccabi Rishon LeZion, 86–81. He became the youngest player to ever win the Israeli League MVP award. Avdija was also named Israeli League Israeli Player of the Year and was an All-Israeli League First Team selection. He finished the season averaging 12.9 points, 6.3 rebounds, and 2.7 assists per game in the Israeli Basketball Premier League. In the EuroLeague, Avdija averaged four points, 2.6 rebounds, and 1.2 assists in 14.3 minutes per game.

=== Washington Wizards (2020–2024) ===
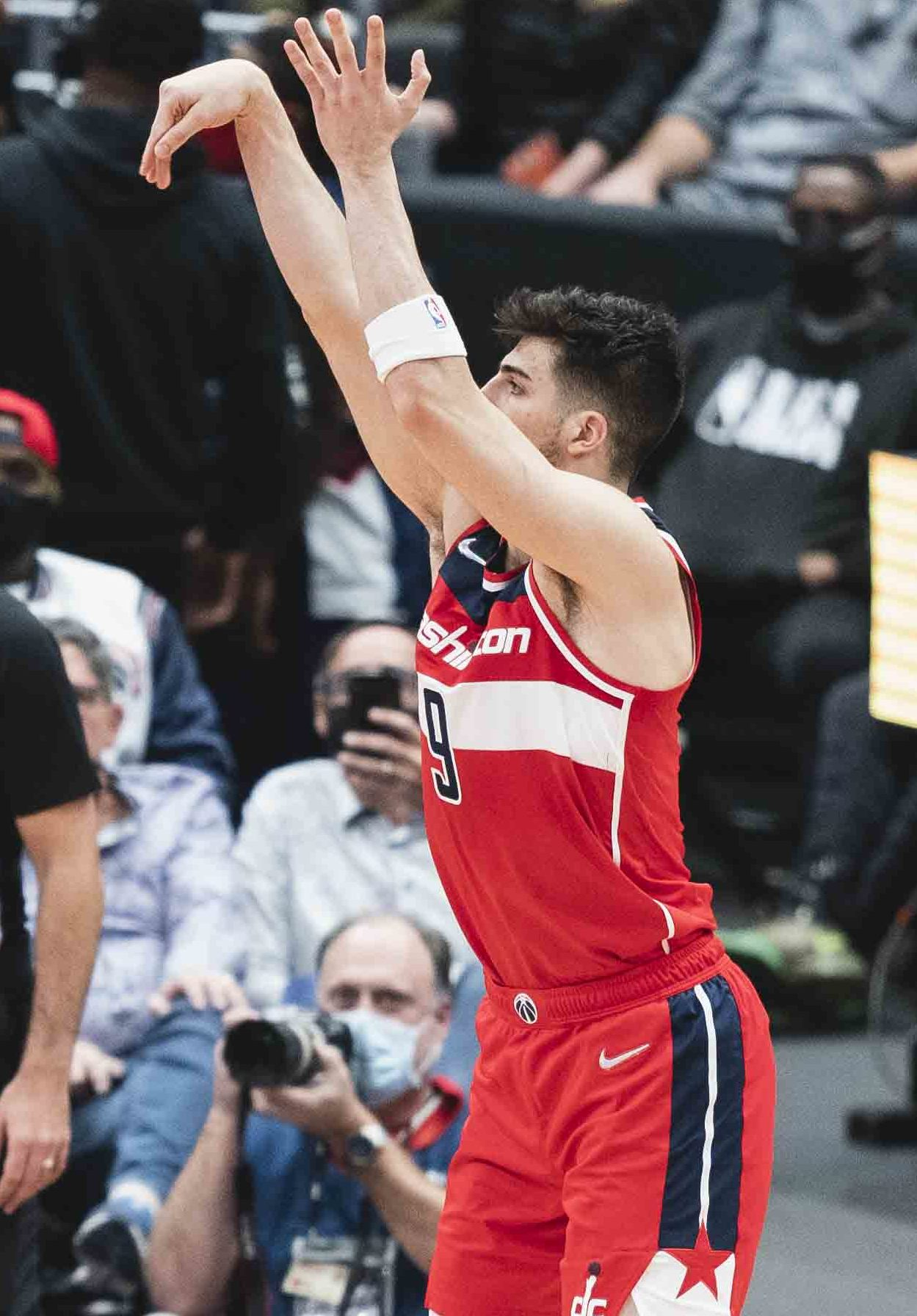
Avdija attempts a midrange shot in October 2021.

Avdija was selected with the ninth overall pick in the 2020 NBA draft by the Washington Wizards. He was projected as a consensus top 5 pick on draft night but slipped. He signed a rookie contract with the Wizards on 1 December 2020.

On 9 January 2021, Avdija recorded a then-career-high 20 points and five three-pointers, along with five rebounds, five assists, and two steals in a 128–124 loss to the Miami Heat. On 21 April, Avdija suffered a season-ending right ankle fracture during a 118–114 win against the Golden State Warriors.

On 14 February 2022, Avdija set a then career high in rebounds with 15 in a 103–94 loss to the Detroit Pistons. During the 2021–22 season, Avdija played all 82 games while averaging 8.4 points, 5.2 rebounds, and 2.0 assists per game.

On 11 January 2023, Avdija set a new career high in rebounds with 20 in a 100–97 win against the Chicago Bulls. On 30 January 2023, Avdija set a then career high in points with 25 in a 127–109 win against the San Antonio Spurs.

On 22 October 2023, Avdija and the Washington Wizards agreed to a 4-year, $55 million contract extension.

On 14 February 2024, Avdija posted a new career high in points with 43, along with 15 rebounds, in a 133–126 loss to the New Orleans Pelicans. He finished the 2023–24 season averaging career highs across every major statistical category, posting statistical averages of 14.7 points per game, 7.2 rebounds per game, 3.8 assists per game, to go along with 51% field goal percentage, 37% three-point shooting percentage, and 3.6 free throw attempts per game.

=== Portland Trail Blazers (2024–present) ===
==== 2024–25 season: First year in Portland ====
On 6 July 2024, Avdija was traded to the Portland Trail Blazers in exchange for Bub Carrington, Malcolm Brogdon, and several draft selections.

On 2 March 2025, Avdija recorded his first career triple-double with 30 points, 12 rebounds and 10 assists in 133–129 overtime loss to the Cleveland Cavaliers. Avdija averaged 23.4 points, 9.8 rebounds and 5.2 assists over the 13 games he played in March 2025, doing so while shooting 51.0% on field goals, and 45.7% on three-point attempts. This was the most productive month of Avdija's career up to this point, garnering attention from multiple sources across the league. On 2 April, Avdija posted his second career triple-double with 32 points, 15 rebounds and 10 assists leading the Blazers to a 127–115 overtime win over the Atlanta Hawks.

==== 2025–26 season: Breakout and first All-Star selection ====
After a strong first third of the 2025–26 season, highlighted by triple-doubles against the Chicago Bulls, the Oklahoma City Thunder, and the San Antonio Spurs, Avdija averaged 25.9 points, 7.3 rebounds, and 7.1 assists in 35.2 minutes per game, emerging as the team's primary offensive option. On 5 January 2026, Avdija was named the NBA's Western Conference Player of the Week for Week 11 (29 December – 4 January), for the first time in his career, after averaging 26.8 points, 8.3 rebounds, and 9.8 assists during a 3–1 week for the Blazers. On 7 January, Avdija scored a season-high 41 points in a 103–102 win over the Houston Rockets. On 1 February, Avdija was named to his first All-Star Game as a Western Conference reserve, becoming the first player of Israeli descent to become an All-Star in NBA history. On 14 April, Avdija recorded 41 points, 7 rebounds, and 12 assists, including a decisive three-point play late in the fourth quarter, to lead the Blazers past the Phoenix Suns 114–110 in the play-in tournament, clinching the No. 7 seed. On 19 April, Avdija was named as one of three finalists for the NBA Most Improved Player award, alongside Nickeil Alexander-Walker and Jalen Duren, and finished third in the voting.

The Blazers would face the San Antonio Spurs during their first-round series. On 19 April, Avdija made his playoff debut, putting up 30 points, ten rebounds, and five assists in a 111–98 Game 1 loss. The Blazers would end up losing the series in five games, with Avdija averaging 22.2 points, 6.0 rebounds, and 4.6 assists per game.

== National team career ==
=== Junior national team ===
Although he had also been eligible to represent Serbia internationally, due to his father's background, Avdija chose to play for Israel because he lived there since he was born. He competed for Israel at the 2017 FIBA U16 European Championship in Podgorica. Avdija led the tournament with 12.6 rebounds and 5.3 assists per game, to go with 15.3 points per game.

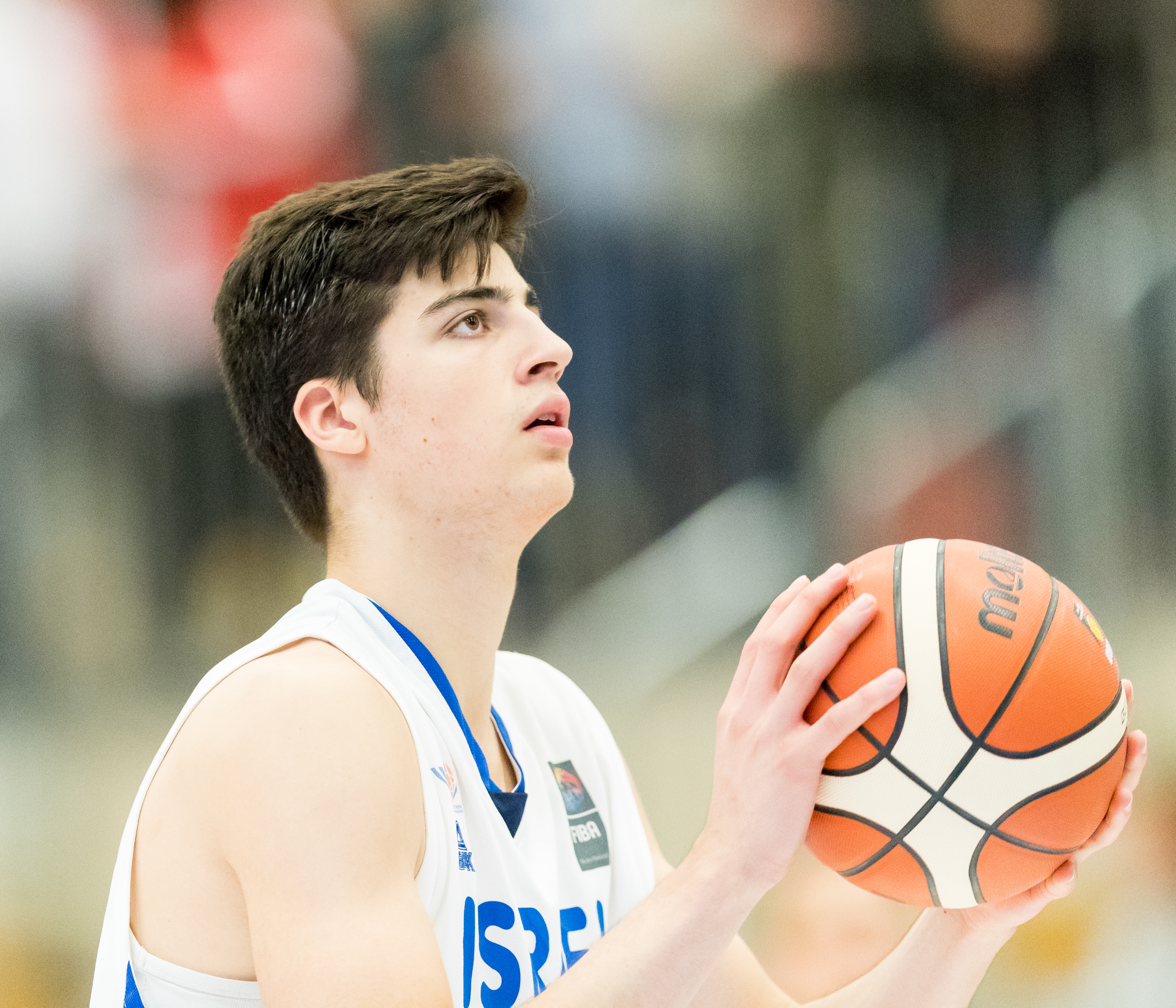
Avdija shoots a free throw for Israel at the Albert Schweitzer Tournament in April 2018.

In April 2018, Avdija averaged over 17 points and nine rebounds for Israel at the Albert Schweitzer Tournament, an under-18 competition in Mannheim. In July 2018, he played at the FIBA U20 European Championship in Chemnitz, leading Israel to a gold medal. Avdija averaged 12.7 points, 6.4 rebounds, 1.1 assists and 1.3 steals per game, while earning a spot on the all-tournament team with teammate Yovel Zoosman. Later that month, Avdija competed at the FIBA U18 European Championship Division B in Skopje. Appearing tired from his previous tournament and lacking in endurance, he averaged 17.3 points, 7.4 rebounds, 3 assists and 1.4 steals per game.

In July 2019, Avdija led Israel to a second straight gold medal at the FIBA U20 European Championship in Tel Aviv. He averaged 18.4 points, 8.3 rebounds, 5.3 assists, 2.4 blocks, and 2.1 steals per game, earning MVP and all-tournament team accolades, as the second-youngest player at the event. Avdija tallied 26 points, 11 rebounds and 5 steals against France in the semifinal, before recording 23 points, 7 assists, 5 rebounds, and 3 blocks against Spain in the final.

=== Senior national team ===
On 21 February 2019, Avdija made his debut for the Israeli senior national team, in an 81–77 win over Germany, during the 2019 FIBA World Cup qualification stage. On 24 February 2020, he recorded 21 points and eight rebounds in 24 minutes in an 87–63 victory over Romania during the EuroBasket 2021 qualifiers.

At the time, his free throw shooting was not as strong as his otherwise versatile game; in 59 games for Maccabi, he averaged 59% from the free throw line and 33% from the 3-point zone.

At the EuroBasket 2022 Avdija scored 23 points along with 15 rebounds, 2 blocks and a steal leading Israel to a 89–87 victory over Finland in the opening game. He averaged 14.6 points, 8.2 rebounds, 4.6 assists, 0.8 steals and 1.2 blocks per game, but Israel was eliminated at the group stage after a 2-3 winning record.

== Personal life ==
His father Zufer Avdija, who is of Gorani origin, was born in Pristina, FPR Yugoslavia. A professional basketball player in Yugoslavia and Israel, Zufer spent 11 years of his playing career with Crvena zvezda and was the team's captain in the 1980s, before moving to the Israeli Premier League in the 1990s and playing 8 seasons for Israeli clubs Ramat HaSharon, Rishon LeZion, Hapoel Tel Aviv, and Elitzur Bat Yam. He also represented the Yugoslavian national team internationally, with whom he won the bronze medal at the 1982 FIBA World Championship. Avdija's mother, Sharon Artzi, an Israeli Jew from kibbutz Beit Zera, is a former track and field athlete and basketball player. Avdija is Jewish, and sat out his first preseason game with the Trail Blazers in 2024 to observe the Jewish holiday of Yom Kippur.

He has said he learned to speak English by playing video games, as well as by watching Nickelodeon sitcoms.

Avdija holds dual citizenship of Israel and Serbia, the latter because his father is a citizen. When he turned 18 years old, he received a deferment from mandatory service in the Israel Defense Forces (IDF) due to his basketball career.

On 1 April 2020, while the basketball season was suspended due to the COVID-19 pandemic, Avdija was drafted into the IDF in a non-combat role called "Exceptional Athlete" status. "I am happy and proud to join the IDF just like every other citizen of my age,” said Avdija. “I will do whatever is asked of me just like I do on the basketball court." After a series of Palestinian attacks in Israel in early 2022, Avdija wrote the phrase "Am Yisrael Chai" in Hebrew on his shoes.

In November 2025, Avdija launched Turbo, a protein ice cream brand whose name is a nod to Avdija's own nickname.

== Career statistics ==
Legend
GP	Games played	GS	Games started	MPG	Minutes per game
FG%	Field goal percentage	3P%	3-point field goal percentage	FT%	Free throw percentage
RPG	Rebounds per game	APG	Assists per game	SPG	Steals per game
BPG	Blocks per game	PPG	Points per game	**Bold**	Career high
*	Led the league

=== NBA ===
==== Regular season ====
Year	Team	GP	GS	MPG	FG%	3P%	FT%	RPG	APG	SPG	BPG	PPG
2020–21	Washington	54	32	23.3	.417	.315	.644	4.9	1.2	.6	.3	6.3
2021–22	Washington	**82***	8	24.2	.432	.317	.757	5.2	2.0	.7	.5	8.4
2022–23	Washington	76	40	26.6	.437	.297	.739	6.4	2.8	.9	.4	9.2
2023–24	Washington	75	**75**	30.1	**.506**	**.374**	.740	7.2	3.8	.8	.5	14.7
2024–25	Portland	72	54	30.0	.476	.365	.780	**7.3**	3.9	**1.0**	.5	16.9
2025–26	Portland	66	66	**33.3**	.462	.318	**.802**	6.9	**6.7**	.8	**.6**	**24.2**
Career		425	275	27.9	.462	.333	.771	6.3	3.4	.8	.5	13.3
All-Star		1	0	15.9	.500	.333	–	1.0	4.0	.0	.0	5.0

==== Playoffs ====
Year	Team	GP	GS	MPG	FG%	3P%	FT%	RPG	APG	SPG	BPG	PPG
2026	Portland	5	5	34.8	.449	.350	.723	6.0	4.6	.4	.6	22.2
Career		5	5	34.8	.449	.350	.723	6.0	4.6	.4	.6	22.2

=== EuroLeague ===
Source: euroleague.net

Year	Team	GP	GS	MPG	FG%	3P%	FT%	RPG	APG	SPG	BPG	PPG	PIR
2018–19	Maccabi Tel Aviv	8	0	6.4	.444	.500	1.000	1.5	.3	.1	.0	3.9	3.0
2019–20	Maccabi Tel Aviv	26	5	14.3	.436	.277	.556	2.6	1.2	.4	.2	4.0	3.9
Career		34	5	12.4	.438	.316	.600	2.4	.9	.3	.2	4.0	3.5

== See also ==
- List of select Jewish basketball players
