= Slovenia men's national under-20 basketball team =

Slovenia
- Joined FIBA: 1992
- FIBA zone: FIBA Europe
- National federation: KZS

Under-21 World Championship
- Appearances: 2
- Medals: None

U20 EuroBasket
- Appearances: 25
- Medals: Gold: 3 (2000, 2004, 2026); Silver: 2 (1998, 2024); Bronze: 1 (2006)

U20 EuroBasket Division B
- Appearances: 1
- Medals: Silver: 1 (2018)
Home	Away

The Slovenia men's national under-20 basketball team (Slovene: Slovenska košarkarska reprezentanca do 20 let) is the representative for Slovenia in international under-20 basketball competitions, and it is organized and run by the Basketball Federation of Slovenia (Košarkarska zveza Slovenije). The Slovenia under-20 national basketball team represents Slovenia at the FIBA U20 EuroBasket.

== Competitive record ==
=== FIBA U20 EuroBasket ===
Year	Pos.	Pld	W	L
(Greece) 1992	Did not participate			
(Slovenia) 1994	8th	7	3	4
(Turkey) 1996	7th	7	4	3
(Italy) 1998	2nd	8	6	2
(North Macedonia) 2000	1st	8	6	2
(Lithuania) 2002	6th	8	5	3
(Czech Republic) 2004	1st	8	5	3
(Russia) 2005	10th	8	4	4
(Turkey) 2006	3rd	8	5	3
(Slovenia) 2007	5th	8	7	1
(Latvia) 2008	14th	6	2	4
(Greece) 2009	13th	6	3	3
(Croatia) 2010	12th	8	2	6
(Spain) 2011	14th	8	2	6
(Slovenia) 2012	7th	9	7	2
(Estonia) 2013	10th	9	5	4
(Greece) 2014	12th	9	3	6
(Italy) 2015	13th	9	6	3
(Finland) 2016	9th	7	4	3
(Greece) 2017	14th	7	2	5
(Germany) 2018	Division B (2nd)			
(Israel) 2019	12th	7	2	5
(Montenegro) 2022	10th	7	3	4
(Greece) 2023	11th	7	2	5
(Poland) 2024	2nd	7	6	1
(Greece) 2025	7th	7	2	5
(Slovenia) 2026	1st	7	7	0
Total	25/27	190	103	87

=== FIBA Under-21 World Championship ===
Year	Pos.	Pld	W	L
(Spain) 1993	Did not participate			
(Australia) 1997	Did not qualify			
(Japan) 2001	6th	8	4	4
(Argentina) 2005	8th	8	2	6
Total	2/4	16	6	10

Note: The FIBA Under-21 World Championship was a men's under-21 basketball competition organized by FIBA. It discontinued in 2005.

== Team ==
=== Past rosters ===
1994 FIBA Europe Under-20 Championship: finished 8th among 12 teams

4 Gorazd Murovec, 5 Rasho Nesterović, 6 Marko Milić, 7 Aleš Kunc, 8 Rado Trifunović, 9 Miha Šetina, 10 Klemen Zaletel, 11 Marko Tušek, 12 Slavko Duščak, 13 Boris Gorenc, 14 Luka Jovanovič, 15 Matjaž Cizej (Coach: Lado Gorjan)

1996 FIBA Europe Under-20 Championship: finished 7th among 12 teams

4 Igor Thaler, 5 Ervin Dragšič, 6 Boštjan Nachbar, 7 Rajmond Rituper, 8 Miloš Šporar, 9 Goran Jagodnik, 10 Slavko Duščak, 11 Marko Tušek, 12 Marko Milić, 13 Gregor Hafnar, 14 Dragiša Drobnjak, 15 Rasho Nesterović (MVP) (Coach: Andrej Urlep)

1998 FIBA Europe Under-20 Championship: finished (silver) among 12 teams

4 Goran Jurak, 5 Jaka Lakovič, 6 Primož Kobale, 7 Marko Verginella, 8 Matjaž Smodiš, 9 Gregor Hafnar, 10 Miloš Šporar, 11 Marko Maravič, 12 Pavel Djurković, 13 Ernest Novak, 14 Dragiša Drobnjak, 15 Primož Brezec (Coach: Zoran Martič)

2000 FIBA Europe Under-20 Championship: finished (gold) among 12 teams

4 Elvis Kadić, 5 Igor Jokić, 6 Primož Brolih, 7 Sani Bečirović (MVP), 8 Milan Klepo, 9 Miha Kobe, 10 Matic Vidic, 11 Davorin Škornik, 12 Željko Zagorac, 13 Smiljan Pavič, 14 Miha Zalokar, 15 Boštjan Nachbar (Coach: Zoran Martič)

2001 Under-21 World Championship: finished 6th among 12 teams

4 Sašo Ožbolt, 5 Nebojša Joksimović, 6 Primož Brolih, 7 Marko Antonijevič, 8 Milan Klepo, 9 Dragan Miletić, 10 Igor Jokić, 11 Željko Zagorac, 12 Boštjan Nachbar, 13 Smiljan Pavič, 14 Davorin Škornik, 15 Erazem Lorbek (Coach: Zoran Martič)

2002 FIBA Europe Under-20 Championship: finished 6th among 12 teams

4 Nejc Strnad, 5 Uroš Slokar, 6 Sasha Vujačić, 7 Domen Lorbek, 8 Igor Ivaškovič, 9 Beno Udrih, 10 Marino Buršić, 11 Saša Zagorac, 12 Miha Zupan, 13 Aleksandar Ćapin, 14 Saša Mučič, 15 Erazem Lorbek (Coach: Memi Bečirović)

2004 FIBA Europe Under-20 Championship: finished (gold) among 12 teams

4 Jure Močnik, 5 Žan Vrečko, 6 Domen Lorbek, 7 Matej Venta, 8 Miha Fon, 9 Dane Dmitrović, 10 Goran Dragić, 11 Saša Zagorac, 12 Mensud Julević, 13 Stanko Sebič, 14 Hasan Rizvić, 15 Erazem Lorbek (MVP) (Coach: Ivan Sunara)

2005 FIBA Europe Under-20 Championship: finished 10th among 16 teams

4 Boris Jeršin, 5 Žan Vrečko, 6 Marko Marković, 7 Jan Rozman, 8 Mirza Begić, 9 Goran Dragić, 10 Sanel Bajramlić, 11 Luka Marolt, 12 Sandi Čebular, 13 Nebojša Čukovič, 14 Jure Močnik, 15 Blaž Črešnar (Coach: Miro Alilović)

2005 FIBA Under-21 World Championship: finished 8th among 12 teams

4 Žan Vrečko, 5 Aljaž Urbanc, 6 Žiga Zagorc, 7 Blaž Črešnar, 8 Miha Fon, 9 Matej Venta, 10 Goran Dragić, 11 Saša Zagorac, 12 Mensud Julević, 13 Domen Lorbek, 14 Hasan Rizvić, 15 Stanko Sebič (Coach: Ivan Perica)

2006 FIBA Europe Under-20 Championship: finished (bronze) among 16 teams

4 Luka Ambrož, 5 Emir Preldžić, 7 Nejc Glavaš, 8 Jaka Klobučar, 9 Rok Perko, 10 Dejan Hohler, 11 Gašper Vidmar, 13 Matej Krušič, 14 Aljoša Remus, 15 Drago Brčina (Coach: Miro Alilović)

2007 FIBA Europe Under-20 Championship: finished 5th among 16 teams

4 Rok Perko, 5 Emir Preldžić, 6 Aljoša Krišto, 7 Jan Močnik, 8 Jaka Klobučar, 9 Dejan Mlakar, 10 Klemen Lorbek, 11 Drago Brčina, 12 Tadej Koštomaj, 13 Matej Krušič, 14 Dejan Čigoja, 15 Gašper Vidmar (Coach: Miro Alilović)

2008 FIBA Europe Under-20 Championship: finished 14th among 16 teams

4 Matija Trampuš, 5 Jakob Virk, 6 Boban Tomić, 7 Luka Lapornik, 8 Mirko Mulalić, 9 Daniel Vujasinović, 10 Ilija Gavrić, 11 Siniša Bilić, 12 Klemen Muha, 13 Zoran Dragić, 14 Dejan Čigoja, 15 Edin Alispahić (Coach: Miro Alilović)

2009 FIBA Europe Under-20 Championship: finished 13th among 16 teams

4 Uroš Zadnik, 5 Maj Kovačevič, 6 Brane Lekić, 7 Žiga Percel, 8 Dino Murić, 9 Daniel Vujasinović, 10 Zoran Dragić, 11 Marko Vranjković, 12 Željko Jotić, 13 Blaž Mahkovic, 14 Luka Dimec, 15 Jaka Blažič (Coach: Rade Mijanović)

2010 FIBA Europe Under-20 Championship: finished 12th among 16 teams

4 Uroš Zadnik, 5 Mirza Sarajlija, 6 Brane Lekić, 7 Nejc Kobal, 8 Dino Murić, 9 Jure Pelko, 10 Jakob Čebašek, 11 Marko Vranjković, 12 Edo Murić, 13 Blaž Mahkovic, 14 Luka Dimec, 15 Nejc Buda (Coach: Rade Mijanović)

2011 FIBA Europe Under-20 Championship: finished 11th among 16 teams

4 Klemen Prepelič, 5 Žan Jerman, 6 Jaka Brodnik, 7 Mitja Nikolić, 8 Edo Murić, 9 Tadej Ferme, 10 Jan Špan, 11 Alen Omić, 12 Marko Pajić, 13 Aljaž Korošeč, 14 Jure Besedić (Coach: Rade Mijanović)

2012 FIBA Europe Under-20 Championship: finished 7th among 16 teams

4 Jan Špan, 5 Luka Rupnik, 6 Jaka Brodnik, 7 Klemen Prepelič, 8 Jure Besedić, 9 Miha Vašl, 10 Alen Omić, 11 Matej Rojc, 12 Marko Pajić, 13 Miha Lapornik, 14 Žiga Dimec, 15 Gëzim Morina (Coach: Zmago Sagadin)

2013 FIBA Europe Under-20 Championship: finished 10th among 20 teams

4 Aleksander Tomić, 5 Luka Rupnik, 6 Matej Rojc, 7 Gregor Hrovat, 8 Domen Bratož, 9 Erjon Kastrati, 10 Žiga Fifolt, 11 Matej Mežan, 12 Žiga Dimec, 13 Miha Lapornik, 14 Matic Maček, 15 Tomaž Bolčina (Coach: Damjan Novaković)

2014 FIBA Europe Under-20 Championship: finished 12th among 20 teams

4 Aleksej Nikolić, 5 Erjon Kastrati, 6 Žiga Zatežič, 7 Jan Rizman, 8 Luka Kokol, 9 Matic Rebec, 10 Jan Dolenšek, 11 Jure Ritlop, 12 Jakob Stražar, 13 David Gabrovšek, 14 Sedin Karavdić, 15 Tomaž Bolčina (Coach: Damjan Novaković)

2015 FIBA Europe Under-20 Championship: finished 13th among 20 teams

4 Jure Špan, 5 Aleksej Nikolić, 6 Domen Janc, 7 Vlatko Čančar, 8 Luka Kokol, 9 Blaž Mesiček, 10 Leon Šantelj, 11 Matic Grušovnik, 12 Jan Kosi, 13 Jure Ritlop, 14 Jan Barbarič, 15 Sedin Karavdić (Coach: Damjan Novaković)

2016 FIBA U20 European Championship: finished 9th among 16 teams

4 Žan Mark Šiško, 5 Aljaž Marinč, 6 Grega Sajevic, 7 Vlatko Čančar, 8 Luka Kraljević, 9 Sandi Grubelič, 10 Urban Durnik, 11 Nejc Martinčič, 12 Nejc Zupan, 13 Jan Kosi, 14 Gaber Ožegovič, 15 Žiga Habat (Coach: Aleksander Sekulić)

2017 FIBA U20 European Championship: finished 14th among 16 teams

4 Urban Oman, 5 Urban Durnik, 6 Jernej Ledl, 7 Aljaž Bratec, 8 Žiga Habat, 9 Nejc Barič, 10 Matic Vesel, 11 Nejc Martinčič, 12 Žan Mark Šiško, 13 Luka Rožanc, 14 Matevž Mlakar, 15 Jurij Macura (Coach: Aleksander Sekulić)

2018 FIBA U20 European Championship Division B: finished (silver) among 22 teams

4 Gaber Ožegovič, 5 David Zajc, 6 Jan Strmčnik, 7 Jan Dornik, 8 Miha Škedelj, 9 Aljaž Bratec, 10 Urban Oman, 11 Jurij Macura, 12 Matic Vesel, 13 Žiga Jurček, 14 Jakov Stipaničev, 15 Denis Alibegović (Coach: Dalibor Damjanović)

2019 FIBA U20 European Championship: finished 11th among 16 teams

4 Jakob Strel, 5 Jernej Andolšek Heine, 6 Miha Škedelj, 7 Nejc Klavžar, 8 Adrian Jogan, 9 Adrian Hirschmann, 10 Jure Ličen, 11 Jakov Stipaničev, 12 Stefan Tovilovič, 13 David Kralj, 14 Tim Tomažič, 15 Leon Stergar (Coach: Dejan Jakara)

2021 FIBA U20 European Challengers: finished (gold) among 6 teams

4 Rok Radović, 5 Luka Ščuka, 6 Bine Prepelič, 7 Gregor Glas, 8 Rok Nemanič, 9 Andrej Stavrov, 10 Dan Duščak, 11 Uroš Šikanić, 12 Primož Kmetić, 13 Robert Jurković, 14 Jan Copot, 15 Klemen Smrekar (Coach: Dejan Jakara)

2022 FIBA U20 European Championship: finished 10th among 16 teams

4 Matej Čibej, 5 Luka Ščuka, 6 Lovro Urbiha, 7 Tibor Mirtič, 8 Nace Frelih, 9 Urban Klavžar, 10 Dan Duščak, 11 Mark Filip Ivanković, 12 Žiga Daneu, 13 Robert Jurković, 14 Saša Ciani, 15 Staš Sivka (Coach: Peter Markovinovič)

2023 FIBA U20 European Championship: finished 11th among 16 teams

4 Matic Lamut, 5 Jošt Flerin, 6 Lovro Urbiha, 7 Urban Klavžar, 8 Matija Samar, 9 Jaka Klobučar, 10 Patrik Kavkler, 11 Mark Filip Ivanković, 12 Saša Ciani, 13 Tibor Mirtič, 14 Matic Mikuš, 15 Jon Dolničar (Coach: Peter Markovinovič)

2024 FIBA U20 EuroBasket: finished (silver) among 16 teams

4 Arne Osojnik, 5 Vukašin Todorović, 6 Jan Zemljič, 7 Urban Klavžar, 8 Matija Samar, 9 Nal Belko, 10 Luka Lampret, 11 Domen Petrovič, 12 Sergej Macura, 13 Gašper Škorjanc, 14 Filip Horvat, 15 Gašper Kočevar (Coach: Peter Markovinovič)

2025 FIBA U20 EuroBasket: finished 7th among 16 teams

4 Filip Razdevšek, 5 Lon Ličan, 6 Rok Popović, 7 Jan Vide, 8 Tristan Vukotić, 9 Peter Bandelj, 10 Nejc Dizdarević, 11 Nik Urbanija, 12 Tim Dragan, 13 Filip Pirš, 14 Vid Borišek, 15 Tadej Colnarič (Coach: Peter Markovinovič)

2026 FIBA U20 EuroBasket: finished (gold) among 16 teams

0 Mark Ciperle, 1 Samed Grošić, 4 Mark Padjen (MVP), 5 Lovro Bolhar, 6 Leon Zdravković, 7 Vit Hrabar, 8 Urban Kroflič, 13 Lovro Lapajne, 14 Bine Plut, 15 Aljaž Menič, 20 Lovro Faganel, 22 Filip Petkovski (Coach: Danijel Radosavljević)

== See also ==
- Slovenia men's national basketball team
- Slovenia men's national under-19 basketball team
- Slovenia women's national under-20 basketball team
