= 2018 ABA League Second Division Final Four =

Basketball league tournament

- Season: 2017–18

Tournament details
- Arena: Borac Hall; Čačak, Serbia
- Dates: 3–4 April 2018

Final positions
- Champions: (Slovenia) Krka (1st title)
- Runners-up: (Slovenia) Sixt Primorska
- Third place: (Serbia) Borac Čačak
- Fourth place: (Serbia) Vršac

Awards and statistics
- MVP: (Bosnia and Herzegovina) Marko Jošilo

The 2018 ABA League Second Division Final Four is the concluding ABA League Second Division tournament of the 2017–18 ABA League Second Division season. The winner of the final four was promoted to the 2018–19 ABA League First Division.

== Venue ==
After having analyzed the offers, that have been submitted following a tender by 9 February 2018, the ABA League Presidency has decided to award the organization of the Final Four Tournament of the ABA League Second Division to the Borac and their town of Čačak, Serbia.

Čačak	2018 ABA League Second Division Final Four (Yugoslavia)
Borac Hall	2018 ABA League Second Division Final Four (Yugoslavia)
Capacity: 4,000	2018 ABA League Second Division Final Four (Yugoslavia)

== Qualified teams ==
Round	Team	Ref.
20th	(Serbia) Borac Čačak	
20th	(Slovenia) Sixt Primorska	
21st	(Slovenia) Krka	
21st	(Serbia) Vršac	

== Bracket ==
Semifinals
3 April
(Serbia) Borac Čačak	82
(Slovenia) Krka	86
3 April
(Slovenia) Sixt Primorska	88
(Serbia) Vršac	64

Final
4 April
(Slovenia) Krka	87
(Slovenia) Sixt Primorska	73

Source: Adriatic League Second Division

== Semifinals ==
=== Borac Čačak v Krka ===
3 April 2018
18:00

Boxscore

Borac Čačak (Serbia)	82–86	(Slovenia) Krka
Scoring by quarter: 24–21, 23–18, 16–25, 19–22
Pts: Pešaković 21; Rebs: Todorović 9 Asts: Marinović 9		Pts: Marinelli 20; Rebs: Jošilo 13; Asts: Marinelli 6

Borac Hall, Čačak
Attendance: 2,500
Referees: Ilija Belošević, Miloš Koljenšić, Vladimir Marić

Starters:			Pts	Reb	Ast
PG	45	(Serbia) Marko Marinović	16	1	9
SG	11	(Serbia) Nikola Pešaković	21	2	5
SF	44	(Serbia) Uroš Čarapić	4	2	0
PF	20	(Serbia) Marko Stojadinović	6	3	1
C	12	(Serbia) Darko Balaban	10	3	0
Reserves:					
PF	5	(Serbia) Luka Ćalović	DNP		
PF	6	(Serbia) Matija Popović	7	3	0
PG	10	(Serbia) Ilija Đoković	DNP		
C	16	(Serbia) Predrag Prlja	0	1	0
SG	17	(Serbia) Miloš Dimić	1	0	1
PF	32	(Serbia) Ivan Gavrilović	DNP		
PF	34	(Serbia) Nemanja Todorović	17	9	1
Head coach:
(Basketball Federation of Serbia) Raško Bojić

Borac	Krka

Starters:			Pts	Reb	Ast
G	5	(Croatia) Paolo Marinelli	20	2	6
G	20	(Slovenia) Maj Kovačevič	5	2	0
G/F	16	(Bosnia and Herzegovina) Marko Jošilo	13	13	2
F	10	(Croatia) Dino Cinac	13	4	1
PF	13	(Serbia) Dalibor Đapa	15	5	2
Reserves:					
SG	1	(Slovenia) Matic Šiška	2	3	0
PG	4	(Slovenia) Martin Jančar Jarc	DNP		
SF	6	(Slovenia) Miha Škedelj	DNP		
SG	7	(Slovenia) Tim Osolnik	0	1	1
PG	8	(Slovenia) Domen Bratož	10	2	1
C	11	(Slovenia) Žiga Dimec	8	8	1
C	31	(Slovenia) Žiga Fifolt	DNP		
Head coach:
(Basketball Federation of Slovenia) Simon Petrov

=== Sixt Primorska v Vršac ===
3 April 2018
20:30

Boxscore

Sixt Primorska (Slovenia)	88–64	(Serbia) Vršac
Scoring by quarter: 16–22, 32–20, 18–12, 22–10
Pts: Ferme 17; Rebs: King 9 Asts: Vujasinović 6		Pts: Simeunović 14; Rebs: Simeunović 8 Asts: Pašajlić, Simeunović 3

Borac Hall, Čačak
Attendance: 1,000
Referees: Tomislav Hordov, Uroš Obrknežević, Gordan Terlević

Starters:			Pts	Reb	Ast
PG	22	(Slovenia) Daniel Vujasinović	8	2	6
G	7	(Slovenia) Nebojša Joksimović	0	3	1
SG	9	(Slovenia) Mirko Mulalić	9	1	1
F	12	(Slovenia) Nejc Zupan	6	2	0
C	6	(Croatia) Marjan Čakarun	15	7	0
Reserves:					
PG	0	(Slovenia) Matic Rebec	15	4	4
SG	1	(Slovenia) Tadej Ferme	17	2	2
C	11	(Slovenia) Jan Kosi	DNP		
SF	20	(Slovenia) Alen Hodžić	8	4	1
C	33	(Saint Vincent and the Grenadines) Shawn King	7	9	2
F/C	34	(Kosovo) Gëzim Morina	0	0	1
SG	37	(Slovenia) Gregor Glas	3	0	0
Head coach:
(Basketball Federation of Slovenia) Jurica Golemac

Primorska	Vršac

Starters:			Pts	Reb	Ast
PG	4	(Serbia) Miroslav Pašajlić	9	0	3
SG	8	(Serbia) Dušan Kutlešić	5	1	1
SF	33	(Serbia) Đorđe Simeunović	14	8	3
PF	7	(Serbia) Miloš Glišić	1	6	1
C	11	(Serbia) Milenko Veljković	6	5	1
Reserves:					
G	3	(Australia) Mirko Đerić	2	0	1
F	6	(Serbia) Stefan Mitrović	0	0	0
G	12	(Serbia) Koča Jovović	0	1	1
F	13	(Serbia) Marko Uzelac	DNP		
SF	21	(Serbia) Danilo Ostojić	8	4	0
SG	24	(Serbia) Stefan Momirov	11	5	0
F/C	45	(Serbia) Stefan Đorđević	8	6	0
Head coach:
(Basketball Federation of Serbia) Goran Topić

== Final ==
4 April 2018
19:00

Boxscore

Krka (Slovenia)	87–73	(Slovenia) Sixt Primorska
Scoring by quarter: 31–29, 16–16, 21–9, 19–19
Pts: Bratož 18; Rebs: Jošilo 10; Asts: Jošilo 5		Pts: Ferme 14; Rebs: King 14; Asts: Rebec 5

Borac Hall, Čačak
Attendance: 1,500
Referees: Uroš Obrknežević, Miloš Koljenšić, Dragan Kralj

Starters:			Pts	Reb	Ast
G	5	(Croatia) Paolo Marinelli	16	4	4
SG	7	(Slovenia) Tim Osolnik	7	2	3
G/F	16	(Bosnia and Herzegovina) Marko Jošilo	16	10	5
F	10	(Croatia) Dino Cinac	11	3	0
C	11	(Slovenia) Žiga Dimec	11	6	0
Reserves:					
SG	1	(Slovenia) Matic Šiška	2	1	2
PG	4	(Slovenia) Martin Jančar Jarc	DNP		
SF	6	(Slovenia) Miha Škedelj	DNP		
PG	8	(Slovenia) Domen Bratož	18	4	2
PF	13	(Serbia) Dalibor Đapa	4	3	0
G	20	(Slovenia) Maj Kovačevič	2	1	0
C	31	(Slovenia) Žiga Fifolt	DNP		
Head coach:
(Basketball Federation of Slovenia) Simon Petrov

Krka	Primorska

2017–18 ABA League Second Division Champions

Krka
1st title
MVP
(Bosnia and Herzegovina) Marko Jošilo

Starters:			Pts	Reb	Ast
PG	22	(Slovenia) Daniel Vujasinović	7	2	2
G	7	(Slovenia) Nebojša Joksimović	3	0	3
SG	9	(Slovenia) Mirko Mulalić	5	1	2
F	12	(Slovenia) Nejc Zupan	5	4	2
C	6	(Croatia) Marjan Čakarun	10	3	0
Reserves:					
PG	0	(Slovenia) Matic Rebec	10	2	5
SG	1	(Slovenia) Tadej Ferme	14	1	3
C	11	(Slovenia) Jan Kosi	DNP		
SF	20	(Slovenia) Alen Hodžić	5	1	0
C	33	(Saint Vincent and the Grenadines) Shawn King	11	14	2
F/C	34	(Kosovo) Gëzim Morina	3	0	0
SG	37	(Slovenia) Gregor Glas	DNP		
Head coach:
(Basketball Federation of Slovenia) Jurica Golemac
