= 2024 FIBA U20 EuroBasket =

International basketball competition

Mistrzostwa Europy w Koszykówce Mężczyzn do lat 20 2024

Tournament details
- Host country: Poland
- City: Gdynia
- Dates: 13–21 July 2024
- Teams: 16 (from 1 confederation)
- Venues: 2 (in 1 host city)

Final positions
- Champions: France (3rd title)
- Runners-up: Slovenia
- Third place: Greece
- Fourth place: Belgium

Tournament statistics
- Games played: 56
- Attendance: 14,150 (253 per game)
- MVP: (France) Zacharie Perrin
- Top scorer: (Czech Republic) Jakub Nečas (18.6 ppg)
- Top rebounds: (Belgium) Nathan Missia-Dio (10.6 rpg)
- Top assists: (Israel) Noam Yaacov (7.2 apg)
- PPG (Team): Lithuania (84.0 ppg)
- RPG (Team): Lithuania (51.6 rpg)
- APG (Team): Spain (24.9 apg)

Official website
- www.fiba.basketball

The 2024 FIBA U20 EuroBasket was the 25th edition of the European basketball championship for men's national under-20 teams. The tournament was played in Gdynia, Poland, from 13 to 21 July 2024.

== Participating teams ==
- Belgium
- Czech Republic ▲ (Winners, 2023 FIBA U20 European Championship Division B)
- France
- Germany
- Greece
- Iceland
- Israel
- Italy
- Lithuania
- Montenegro
- North Macedonia ▲ (Runners-up, 2023 FIBA U20 European Championship Division B)
- Poland
- Serbia
- Slovenia
- Spain
- Turkey

== First round ==
The draw of the first round was held on 6 February 2024 in Freising, Germany.

In the first round, the teams were drawn into four groups of four. All teams advance to the playoffs.

All times are local (Central European Summer Time – UTC+2).

=== Group A ===
Pos	Team	Pld	W	L	PF	PA	PD	Pts
1	Serbia	3	2	1	246	214	+32	5
2	France	3	2	1	250	194	+56	5
3	Poland	3	1	2	198	275	−77	4
4	Greece	3	1	2	205	216	−11	4

Source: FIBA

13 July 2024
18:00

Boxscore

France	110–56	Poland
Scoring by quarter: 26–21, 32–14, 28–10, 24–11
Pts: Perrin 22; Rebs: Penda 9 Asts: Bouzidi 13		Pts: Wrzeszcz 19; Rebs: Kempa 10; Asts: Wrzeszcz 6

Polsat Plus Arena
Attendance: 1,026
Referees: Igor Mitrovski (MKD), Jan Baloun (CZE), Ori Shalhavi (ISR)

13 July 2024
20:30

Boxscore

Greece	75–73	Serbia
Scoring by quarter: 15–15, 23–15, 17–17, 20–26
Pts: Chitikoudis, Zougris 14; Rebs: Samodurov 10; Asts: Karakostas 5		Pts: Milijašević 17; Rebs: Đulović 8 Asts: Mušicki 4

Polsat Plus Arena
Attendance: 200
Referees: Marius Ciulin (ROU), Gintaras Maciulis (LTU), Andrea Bongiorni (ITA)

14 July 2024
15:30

Boxscore

Serbia	76–72	France
Scoring by quarter: 26–16, 13–18, 19–21, 18–17
Pts: Milijašević 20; Rebs: Đulović 9 Asts: Mušicki 3		Pts: Diawara, Penda 12; Rebs: Penda 10; Asts: Penda 6

Hala Gier Gdyńskiego Centrum Sportu
Attendance: 150
Referees: Lorenzo Baldini (ITA), Ali Sakaci (TUR), Christian Theis (GER)

14 July 2024
18:00

Boxscore

Poland	75–68	Greece
Scoring by quarter: 14–20, 22–14, 17–25, 22–9
Pts: Andrzejewski 23; Rebs: Three players 6 Asts: Three players 4		Pts: Karakostas 18; Rebs: Zougris 11; Asts: Three players 3

Polsat Plus Arena
Attendance: 1,100
Referees: Arnau Padros (ESP), Jan Baloun (CZE), David Tomasson (ISL)

15 July 2024
13:00

Boxscore

Greece	62–68	France
Scoring by quarter: 17–24, 16–16, 17–13, 12–15
Pts: Karakostas 16; Rebs: Zougris 16; Asts: Plotas 6		Pts: Penda 16; Rebs: Penda 9 Asts: Perrin 4

Hala Gier Gdyńskiego Centrum Sportu
Attendance: 50
Referees: Igor Mitrovski (MKD), Zafer Yilmaz (TUR), Andrea Bongiorni (ITA)

15 July 2024
18:00

Boxscore

Poland	67–97	Serbia
Scoring by quarter: 10–24, 17–20, 17–23, 23–30
Pts: Wrzeszcz 14; Rebs: Luczynski 7 Asts: Stupnicki 4		Pts: Jović 27; Rebs: Đulović 13; Asts: Three players 5

Polsat Plus Arena
Attendance: 1,000
Referees: Gintaras Maciulis (LTU), Christian Theis (GER), Iain Macdonald (GBR)

=== Group B ===
Pos	Team	Pld	W	L	PF	PA	PD	Pts
1	Israel	3	2	1	233	219	+14	5
2	Italy	3	2	1	230	216	+14	5
3	Germany	3	2	1	227	220	+7	5
4	Czech Republic	3	0	3	205	240	−35	3

Source: FIBA

13 July 2024
13:00

Boxscore

Israel	82–74	Czech Republic
Scoring by quarter: 24–17, 26–18, 15–23, 17–16
Pts: Harel 16; Rebs: Michaeli 8 Asts: Yaacov 6		Pts: Stranel 21; Rebs: Nečas 10; Asts: Slowiak 5

Polsat Plus Arena
Attendance: 100
Referees: Lukasz Jankowski (POL), Alexandre Maret (FRA), Nace Mohorič (SLO)

13 July 2024
15:30

Boxscore

Germany	67–87	Italy
Scoring by quarter: 20–21, 19–21, 14–18, 14–27
Pts: Brockhoff 13; Rebs: Brockhoff 7 Asts: Kalu 4		Pts: Marangon 14; Rebs: Salvioni 7 Asts: Maretto 3

Polsat Plus Arena
Attendance: 150
Referees: Georgios Poursanidis (GRE), Ali Sakaci (TUR), Sava Cetkovic (MNE)

14 July 2024
13:00

Boxscore

Czech Republic	72–87	Germany
Scoring by quarter: 17–14, 20–22, 20–31, 15–20
Pts: Svoboda 13; Rebs: Nečas 6 Asts: Slowiak 5		Pts: Ensminger 13; Rebs: Pleta 6 Asts: Ensminger 5

Polsat Plus Arena
Attendance: 150
Referees: Zafer Yilmaz (TUR), Nemanja Ninkovic (SRB), Tom De Lange (BEL)

14 July 2024
20:30

Boxscore

Italy	72–90	Israel
Scoring by quarter: 15–17, 18–26, 18–22, 21–25
Pts: Gallo 17; Rebs: D'Amelio 8 Asts: Maretto 6		Pts: Yaacov 20; Rebs: Michaeli, Yaacov 7 Asts: Yaacov 7

Hala Gier Gdyńskiego Centrum Sportu
Attendance: 100
Referees: Valentin Oliot (FRA), Iain Macdonald (GBR), Janis Rozenbergs (LAT)

15 July 2024
15:30

Boxscore

Czech Republic	59–71	Italy
Scoring by quarter: 14–30, 17–14, 13–13, 15–14
Pts: Nečas 19; Rebs: Nečas 6 Asts: Slowiak 3		Pts: Gallo 20; Rebs: Salvioni 8 Asts: Faggian 3

Hala Gier Gdyńskiego Centrum Sportu
Attendance: 50
Referees: Ali Sakaci (TUR), Lukasz Jankowski (POL), Sava Cetkovic (MNE)

15 July 2024
20:30

Boxscore

Germany	73–61	Israel
Scoring by quarter: 15–13, 16–14, 19–18, 23–16
Pts: Kalu 14; Rebs: Anigbata 7 Asts: Ensminger 6		Pts: Yaacov 18; Rebs: Michaeli 10; Asts: Yaacov 3

Hala Gier Gdyńskiego Centrum Sportu
Attendance: 155
Referees: Arnau Padros (ESP), Ilias Karpanos (GRE), Nace Mohorič (SLO)

=== Group C ===
Pos	Team	Pld	W	L	PF	PA	PD	Pts
1	Spain	3	3	0	255	156	+99	6
2	Belgium	3	2	1	195	202	−7	5
3	Turkey	3	1	2	225	200	+25	4
4	North Macedonia	3	0	3	152	269	−117	3

Source: FIBA

13 July 2024
18:00

Boxscore

Turkey	62–64	Belgium
Scoring by quarter: 20–16, 15–19, 15–17, 12–12
Pts: Efeoglu 12; Rebs: Buyuktuncel 10; Asts: Tunca 7		Pts: Bryant Jr 15; Rebs: Missia-Dio 12; Asts: Meeusen 8

Hala Gier Gdyńskiego Centrum Sportu
Attendance: 50
Referees: Valentin Oliot (FRA), Christian Theis (GER), David Tomasson (ISL)

13 July 2024
20:30

Boxscore

Spain	93–38	North Macedonia
Scoring by quarter: 21–9, 27–4, 27–11, 18–14
Pts: Langarita, Almansa 14; Rebs: Nogues Gonzalez 9 Asts: Nogues Gonzalez 6		Pts: Boshaleski 7 Rebs: Ivanov 5 Asts: Three players 2

Hala Gier Gdyńskiego Centrum Sportu
Attendance: 51
Referees: Lorenzo Baldini (ITA), Nemanja Ninkovic (SRB), Ievgenii Nagornyi (UKR)

14 July 2024
15:30

Boxscore

Belgium	45–81	Spain
Scoring by quarter: 11–13, 8–22, 15–21, 11–25
Pts: Grymonprez 10; Rebs: Bryant Jr 7 Asts: Van Eyck, Temmerman 2		Pts: Almansa 14; Rebs: Almansa 9 Asts: Villar, Martinez 7

Polsat Plus Arena
Attendance: 150
Referees: Georgios Poursanidis (GRE), Andrea Bongiorni (ITA), Nace Mohorič (SLO)

14 July 2024
20:30

Boxscore

North Macedonia	55–90	Turkey
Scoring by quarter: 22–23, 16–19, 2–22, 15–26
Pts: Stojanoski 12; Rebs: Stojanoski 8 Asts: Shoshkikj, Dimitrievski 3		Pts: Tunca 20; Rebs: Buyuktuncel, Efeoglu 8 Asts: Cengiz, Sivas 6

Polsat Plus Arena
Attendance: Gintaras Maciulis (LTU), Ilias Karpanos (GRE), Sava Cetkovic (MNE)
Referees: 50

15 July 2024
15:30

Boxscore

Turkey	73–81	Spain
Scoring by quarter: 20–17, 19–19, 17–23, 17–22
Pts: Tunca 25; Rebs: Demirel 6 Asts: Cengiz, Tunca 6		Pts: Rodriguez 15; Rebs: Almansa, Nogues Gonzalez 7 Asts: De Larrea 6

Polsat Plus Arena
Attendance: 150
Referees: Marius Ciulin (ROU), Alexandre Maret (FRA), David Tomasson (ISL)

15 July 2024
18:00

Boxscore

North Macedonia	59–86	Belgium
Scoring by quarter: 4–16, 14–20, 20–22, 21–28
Pts: Boshaleski, Simikj 14; Rebs: Simikj 5 Asts: Jovanovikj, Simikj 3		Pts: Meeusen 18; Rebs: Missia-Dio 11; Asts: Raedschelders 4

Hala Gier Gdyńskiego Centrum Sportu
Attendance: 50
Referees: Valentin Oliot (FRA), Nemanja Ninkovic (SRB), Ori Shalhavi (ISR)

=== Group D ===
Pos	Team	Pld	W	L	PF	PA	PD	Pts
1	Slovenia	3	3	0	248	191	+57	6
2	Lithuania	3	2	1	251	180	+71	5
3	Iceland	3	1	2	202	244	−42	4
4	Montenegro	3	0	3	162	248	−86	3

Source: FIBA

13 July 2024
13:00

Boxscore

Montenegro	61–81	Slovenia
Scoring by quarter: 19–23, 20–13, 12–24, 10–21
Pts: Sudar, Lacmanovic 16; Rebs: Lacmanovic 7 Asts: Minic 3		Pts: Todorovic, Klavzar 15; Rebs: Skorjanc 8 Asts: Skorjanc 6

Hala Gier Gdyńskiego Centrum Sportu
Attendance: 50
Referees: Arnau Padros (ESP), Iain Macdonald (GBR), Ilias Karpanos (GRE)

13 July 2024
15:30

Boxscore

Lithuania	93–63	Iceland
Scoring by quarter: 24–12, 28–9, 18–16, 23–26
Pts: Murauskas 19; Rebs: Murauskas 12; Asts: Jocys 4		Pts: Thrastarson 11; Rebs: Palsson, Halldorsson 5 Asts: Five players 2

Hala Gier Gdyńskiego Centrum Sportu
Attendance: 75
Referees: Zafer Yilmaz (TUR), Tom De Lange (BEL), Janis Rozenbergs (LAT)

14 July 2024
13:00

Boxscore

Iceland	71–53	Montenegro
Scoring by quarter: 14–27, 24–14, 21–8, 12–4
Pts: Atlason 23; Rebs: Arnarson 8 Asts: Halldorsson 9		Pts: Lacmanovic 13; Rebs: Lacmanovic 8 Asts: Sudar 3

Hala Gier Gdyńskiego Centrum Sportu
Attendance: 70
Referees: Igor Mitrovski (MKD), Alexandre Maret (FRA), Ievgenii Nagornyi (UKR)

14 July 2024
18:00

Boxscore

Slovenia	69–62	Lithuania
Scoring by quarter: 12–17, 16–20, 24–11, 17–14
Pts: Petrovic 14; Rebs: Klavzar 8 Asts: Three players 3		Pts: Vokietaitis 14; Rebs: Krivas 11; Asts: Jocys 3

Hala Gier Gdyńskiego Centrum Sportu
Attendance: 160
Referees: Marius Ciulin (ROU), Lukasz Jankowski (POL), Ori Shalhavi (ISR)

15 July 2024
13:00

Boxscore

Iceland	68–98	Slovenia
Scoring by quarter: 19–29, 22–29, 12–19, 15–21
Pts: Atlason 14; Rebs: Curtis 8 Asts: Thrastarson, Halldorsson 5		Pts: Macura 16; Rebs: Macura 7 Asts: Zemljic 5

Polsat Plus Arena
Attendance: 75
Referees: Georgios Poursanidis (GRE), Jan Baloun (CZE), Ievgenii Nagornyi (UKR)

15 July 2024
20:30

Boxscore

Montenegro	48–96	Lithuania
Scoring by quarter: 10–27, 14–22, 13–22, 11–25
Pts: Minic, Zizic 8 Rebs: Todorovic 5 Asts: Sudar 3		Pts: Vokietaitis 17; Rebs: Murauskas 12; Asts: Kublickas, Murauskas 6

Polsat Plus Arena
Attendance: 100
Referees: Lorenzo Baldini (ITA), Tom De Lange (BEL), Janis Rozenbergs (LAT)

== Playoff brackets ==
=== Main bracket ===
Round of 16
17 July
A1 Serbia	67
B4 Czech Republic	72
17 July
C2 Belgium	74
D3 Iceland	73
17 July
B2 Italy	63
A3 Poland	74
17 July
D1 Slovenia	82
C4 North Macedonia	71
17 July
A2 France	103
B3 Germany	78
17 July
C1 Spain	80
D4 Montenegro	45
17 July
B1 Israel	65
A4 Greece	68
17 July
D2 Lithuania	79
C3 Turkey	63

Quarterfinals
18 July
Czech Republic	68
Belgium	78
18 July
Poland	72
Slovenia	73
18 July
France	74
Spain	72
18 July
Greece	87
Lithuania	82

Semifinals
20 July
Belgium	79
Slovenia	91
20 July
France	69
Greece	57

Final
21 July
Slovenia	78
France	82
3rd place match
21 July
Belgium	68
Greece	70

=== 5th place bracket ===
5th–8th place semifinals
20 July
Czech Republic	79
Poland	78
20 July
Spain	73
Lithuania	82

5th place match
21 July
Czech Republic	85
Lithuania	94
7th place match
21 July
Poland	80
Spain	107

=== 9th place bracket ===
9th–16th place quarterfinals
18 July
Serbia	101
Iceland	79
18 July
Italy	92
North Macedonia	70
18 July
Germany	86
Montenegro	58
18 July
Israel	116
Turkey	81

9th–12th place semifinals
20 July
Serbia	64
Italy	71
20 July
Germany	58
Israel	67

9th place match
21 July
Italy	69
Israel	58
11th place match
21 July
Serbia	75
Germany	68

=== 13th place bracket ===
13th–16th place semifinals
20 July
Iceland	116
North Macedonia	87
20 July
Montenegro	57
Turkey	85

13th place match
21 July
Iceland	96
Turkey	95
15th place match
21 July
North Macedonia	81
Montenegro	69

== Playoff results ==
=== Round of 16 ===
17 July 2024
13:00

Boxscore

France	103–78	Germany
Scoring by quarter: 20–23, 26–20, 30–15, 27–20
Pts: Domon 21; Rebs: Perrin 8 Asts: Bouzidi 9		Pts: Pleta, Kalu 12; Rebs: Schulte 7 Asts: Rapieque 6

Hala Gier Gdyńskiego Centrum Sportu
Attendance: 50
Referees: Lorenzo Baldini (ITA), Jan Baloun (CZE), Janis Rozenbergs (LAT)

17 July 2024
13:00

Boxscore

Slovenia	82–71	North Macedonia
Scoring by quarter: 27–16, 12–17, 23–18, 20–20
Pts: Four players 14; Rebs: Petrovic 10; Asts: Skorjanc 6		Pts: Jovanovikj 19; Rebs: Stojanoski 7 Asts: Jovanovikj 5

Polsat Plus Arena
Attendance: 72
Referees: Arnau Padros (ESP), Tom De Lange (BEL), Ilias Karpanos (GRE)

17 July 2024
15:30

Boxscore

Italy	63–74	Poland
Scoring by quarter: 22–17, 11–14, 19–28, 11–15
Pts: Gallo 15; Rebs: Innocenti 10; Asts: Gallo 5		Pts: Wilczek, Kempa 18; Rebs: Kempa 16; Asts: Wrzeszcz 5

Polsat Plus Arena
Attendance: 700
Referees: Georgios Poursanidis (GRE), Ali Sakaci (TUR), David Tomasson (ISL)

17 July 2024
15:30

Boxscore

Spain	80–45	Montenegro
Scoring by quarter: 14–12, 17–12, 24–11, 25–10
Pts: De Larrea, Folgueiras 11; Rebs: Nogues Gonzalez 11; Asts: Three players 3		Pts: Minic 15; Rebs: Zizic 7 Asts: Three players 1

Hala Gier Gdyńskiego Centrum Sportu
Attendance: 50
Referees: Zafer Yilmaz (TUR), Ori Shalhavi (ISR), Nace Mohorič (SLO)

17 July 2024
18:00

Boxscore

Serbia	67–72	Czech Republic
Scoring by quarter: 22–15, 18–19, 18–20, 9–18
Pts: Milijašević 20; Rebs: Đulović, Stanković 5 Asts: Milijašević, Stanković 5		Pts: Nečas 20; Rebs: Nečas 11; Asts: Zvolanek 6

Hala Gier Gdyńskiego Centrum Sportu
Attendance: 75
Referees: Valentin Oliot (FRA), Alexandre Maret (FRA), Ievgenii Nagornyi (UKR)

17 July 2024
18:00

Boxscore

Israel	65–68	Greece
Scoring by quarter: 15–19, 14–15, 20–16, 16–18
Pts: Michaeli 17; Rebs: Harel, Dolinski 7 Asts: Yaacov 8		Pts: Karakostas 20; Rebs: Samodurov 8 Asts: Plotas 5

Polsat Plus Arena
Attendance: 200
Referees: Marius Ciulin (ROU), Christian Theis (GER), Iain Macdonald (GBR)

17 July 2024
20:30

Boxscore

Belgium	74–73	Iceland
Scoring by quarter: 20–19, 10–19, 24–15, 20–20
Pts: Missia-Dio 35; Rebs: Missia-Dio 16; Asts: Meeusen 11		Pts: Atlason 19; Rebs: Thrastarson 7 Asts: Halldorsson 9

Hala Gier Gdyńskiego Centrum Sportu
Attendance: 100
Referees: Gintaras Maciulis (LTU), Andrea Bongiorni (ITA), Sava Cetkovic (MNE)

17 July 2024
20:30

Boxscore

Lithuania	79–63	Turkey
Scoring by quarter: 17–18, 20–17, 22–4, 20–24
Pts: Krivas 19; Rebs: Murauskas 16; Asts: Kublickas 4		Pts: Tunca 22; Rebs: Yildizoglu 6 Asts: Cengiz 4

Polsat Plus Arena
Attendance: 200
Referees: Igor Mitrovski (MKD), Lukasz Jankowski (POL), Nemanja Ninkovic (SRB)

=== 9th–16th place quarterfinals ===
18 July 2024
13:00

Boxscore

Germany	86–58	Montenegro
Scoring by quarter: 29–13, 17–16, 19–18, 21–11
Pts: Rapieque 17; Rebs: Ensminger 10; Asts: Machowski 8		Pts: Minic 14; Rebs: Radonjic 6 Asts: Jankovic 5

Hala Gier Gdynskiego Centrum Sportu
Attendance: 50
Referees: Arnau Padros (ESP), Nemanja Ninkovic (SRB), Janis Rozenbergs (LAT)

18 July 2024
15:30

Boxscore

Serbia	101–79	Iceland
Scoring by quarter: 22–26, 29–20, 26–17, 24–16
Pts: Đulović 21; Rebs: Nikolić 12; Asts: Four players 5		Pts: Atlason 20; Rebs: Three players 3 Asts: Halldorsson 7

Hala Gier Gdynskiego Centrum Sportu
Attendance: 50
Referees: Ali Sakaci (TUR), Ilias Karpanos (GRE), Ori Shalhavi (ISR)

18 July 2024
18:00

Boxscore

Italy	92–70	North Macedonia
Scoring by quarter: 25–14, 25–17, 25–23, 17–16
Pts: Pozzato 33; Rebs: Innocenti 6 Asts: Gallo 6		Pts: Simikj 18; Rebs: Stojanoski 9 Asts: Shoshkikj 9

Hala Gier Gdynskiego Centrum Sportu
Attendance: 50
Referees: Christian Theis (GER), Ievgenii Nagornyi (UKR), Sava Cetkovic (MNE)

18 July 2024
20:30

Boxscore

Israel	113–81	Turkey
Scoring by quarter: 27–29, 26–17, 28–25, 31–10
Pts: Doron, Dolinski 21; Rebs: Three players 5 Asts: Yaacov 12		Pts: Buyuktuncel 19; Rebs: Buyuktuncel 7 Asts: Tunca 9

Hala Gier Gdynskiego Centrum Sportu
Attendance: 50
Referees: Alexandre Maret (FRA), Tom De Lange (BEL), Nace Mohorič (SLO)

=== 13th–16th place semifinals ===
20 July 2024
13:00

Boxscore

Iceland	116–87	North Macedonia
Scoring by quarter: 14–20, 32–18, 43–25, 27–24
Pts: Arnarson 30; Rebs: Arnarson, Halldorsson 7 Asts: Halldorsson 12		Pts: Shoshkikj 19; Rebs: Simikj 8 Asts: Shoshkikj 5

Hala Gier Gdynskiego Centrum Sportu
Attendance: 45
Referees: Georgios Poursanidis (GRE), Alexandre Maret (FRA), Jan Baloun (CZE)

20 July 2024
15:30

Boxscore

Montenegro	57–85	Turkey
Scoring by quarter: 11–22, 15–23, 15–20, 16–20
Pts: Sudar 20; Rebs: Sudar 8 Asts: Sudar 4		Pts: Cengiz 15; Rebs: Buyuktuncel, Yildizoglu 6 Asts: Tunca 7

Hala Gier Gdynskiego Centrum Sportu
Referees: Valentin Oliot (FRA), Christian Theis (GER), Janis Rozenbergs (LAT)

=== 15th place match ===
21 July 2024
11:00

Boxscore

North Macedonia	81–69	Montenegro
Scoring by quarter: 11–15, 26–12, 25–15, 19–27
Pts: Simikj 15; Rebs: Stojanoski 8 Asts: Jovanovikj 7		Pts: Minic 17; Rebs: Minic, Brajovic 5 Asts: Three players 3

Hala Gier Gdynskiego Centrum Sportu
Attendance: 50
Referees: Alexandre Maret (FRA), Tom De Lange (BEL), Ori Shalhavi (ISR)

=== 13th place match ===
21 July 2024
15:30

Boxscore

Iceland	96–95	Turkey
Scoring by quarter: 24–18, 12–20, 32–22, 28–35
Pts: Thrastarson 26; Rebs: Atlason 13; Asts: Kjartansson, Thrastarson 7		Pts: Tunca 26; Rebs: Buyuktuncel 14; Asts: Tunca 9

Polsat Plus Arena
Attendance: 50
Referees: Marius Ciulin (ROU), Gintaras Maciulis (LTU), Sava Cetkovic (MNE)

=== 9th–12th place semifinals ===
20 July 2024
18:00

Boxscore

Serbia	64–71	Italy
Scoring by quarter: 19–23, 16–9, 14–13, 15–26
Pts: Nikolić 14; Rebs: Milenković, Stanković 6 Asts: Three players 4		Pts: Ferrari 16; Rebs: D'Amelio 8 Asts: Faggian 5

Hala Gier Gdynskiego Centrum Sportu
Attendance: 50
Referees: Igor Mitrovski (MKD), Ievgenii Nagornyi (UKR), Nace Mohorič (SLO)

20 July 2024
20:30

Boxscore

Germany	58–67	Israel
Scoring by quarter: 15–16, 12–21, 18–16, 13–14
Pts: Pleta 18; Rebs: Ensminger 8 Asts: Rapieque 4		Pts: Michaeli, Menachem 12; Rebs: Michaeli 8 Asts: Lempert, Menachem 3

Hala Gier Gdynskiego Centrum Sportu
Attendance: 50
Referees: Lukasz Jankowski (POL), Iain Macdonald (GBR), Tom De Lange (BEL)

=== 11th place match ===
21 July 2024
13:30

Boxscore

Serbia	75–68	Germany
Scoring by quarter: 20–17, 16–16, 21–17, 18–18
Pts: Malešević 12; Rebs: Malešević 14; Asts: Ristić 4		Pts: Rapieque 16; Rebs: Ensminger 5 Asts: Onyejiaka 5

Hala Gier Gdynskiego Centrum Sportu
Attendance: 50
Referees: Ali Sakaci (TUR), Iain Macdonald (GBR), Janis Rozenbergs (LAT)

=== 9th place match ===
21 July 2024
16:00

Boxscore

Italy	69–58	Israel
Scoring by quarter: 13–15, 19–17, 18–11, 19–15
Pts: Gallo 15; Rebs: Salvioni 9 Asts: Gallo, Torresani 4		Pts: Dolinski 13; Rebs: Dolinski 6 Asts: Menachem 5

Hala Gier Gdynskiego Centrum Sportu
Attendance: 150
Referees: Igor Mitrovski (MKD), Nemanja Ninkovic (SRB), Nace Mohorič (SLO)

=== Championship quarterfinals ===
18 July 2024
13:00

Boxscore

France	74–72	Spain
Scoring by quarter: 19–22, 13–18, 20–14, 22–18
Pts: Perrin 20; Rebs: Perrin 10; Asts: Penda 5		Pts: Almansa 14; Rebs: Mara 9 Asts: Villar 9

Polsat Plus Arena
Attendance: 500
Referees: Marius Ciulin (ROU), Andrea Bongiorni (ITA), Lukasz Jankowski (POL)

18 July 2024
15:30

Boxscore

Czech Republic	68–78	Belgium
Scoring by quarter: 19–17, 10–19, 27–21, 12–21
Pts: Nečas 20; Rebs: Stovicek 7 Asts: Slowiak 5		Pts: Temmerman 20; Rebs: Missia-Dio 15; Asts: Meeusen 9

Polsat Plus Arena
Attendance: 250
Referees: Georgios Poursanidis (GRE), Gintaras Maciulis (LTU), David Tomasson (ISL)

18 July 2024
18:00

Boxscore

Poland	72–73	Slovenia
Scoring by quarter: 15–27, 19–14, 19–9, 19–23
Pts: Wrzeszcz 20; Rebs: Kempa 18; Asts: Andrzejewski, Kempa 4		Pts: Klavzar 17; Rebs: Kocevar 9 Asts: Belko 4

Polsat Plus Arena
Attendance: 1,200
Referees: Igor Mitrovski (MKD), Valentin Oliot (FRA), Iain Macdonald (GBR)

18 July 2024
20:30

Boxscore

Greece	87–82	Lithuania
Scoring by quarter: 19–21, 18–18, 27–21, 23–22
Pts: Karakostas 20; Rebs: Zougris 9 Asts: Karakostas, Paraskevopoulos 5		Pts: Keinys, Murauskas 15; Rebs: Vokietaitis 15; Asts: Kublickas 6

Polsat Plus Arena
Attendance: 400
Referees: Lorenzo Baldini (ITA), Zafer Yilmaz (TUR), Jan Baloun (CZE)

=== 5th–8th place semifinals ===
20 July 2024
13:00

Boxscore

Spain	73–82	Lithuania
Scoring by quarter: 15–23, 19–22, 19–15, 20–22
Pts: Almansa 23; Rebs: Almansa 7 Asts: Martinez 6		Pts: Murauskas 29; Rebs: Krivas 12; Asts: Jocys 4

Polsat Plus Arena
Attendance: 250
Referees: Ali Sakaci (TUR), Nemanja Ninkovic (SRB), Ori Shalhavi (ISR)

20 July 2024
15:30

Boxscore

Czech Republic	79–78	Poland
Scoring by quarter: 15–20, 17–26, 16–16, 31–16
Pts: Nečas 24; Rebs: Nečas 11; Asts: Zvolanek 9		Pts: Stupnicki 19; Rebs: Luczynski, Kempa 7 Asts: Stupnicki, Wrzeszcz 4

Polsat Plus Arena
Attendance: 1,100
Referees: Zafer Yilmaz (TUR), Ilias Karpanos (GRE), Sava Cetkovic (MNE)

=== 7th place match ===
21 July 2024
18:30

Boxscore

Poland	80–107	Spain
Scoring by quarter: 19–28, 18–32, 24–22, 19–25
Pts: Andrzejewski 14; Rebs: Ratowski 7 Asts: Szumert, Kempa 3		Pts: Almansa 23; Rebs: Nogues Gonzalez 9 Asts: Three players 5

Hala Gier Gdynskiego Centrum Sportu
Attendance: 295
Referees: Valentin Oliot (FRA), Christian Theis (GER), Ilias Karpanos (GRE)

=== 5th place match ===
21 July 2024
13:00

Boxscore

Czech Republic	85–94	Lithuania
Scoring by quarter: 25–22, 30–20, 21–25, 9–27
Pts: Nečas 27; Rebs: Nečas 9 Asts: Nečas, Slowiak 5		Pts: Murauskas 29; Rebs: Krivas 8 Asts: Jocys 6

Polsat Plus Arena
Attendance: 50
Referees: Arnau Padros (ESP), David Tomasson (ISL), Ievgenii Nagornyi (UKR)

=== Championship semifinals ===
20 July 2024
18:00

Boxscore

Belgium	79–91	Slovenia
Scoring by quarter: 18–35, 18–25, 18–15, 25–16
Pts: Bryant Jr 20; Rebs: Missia-Dio 7 Asts: Raedschelders 4		Pts: Klavzar 20; Rebs: Todorovic 7 Asts: Skorjanc 5

Polsat Plus Arena
Attendance: 200
Referees: Lorenzo Baldini (ITA), Andrea Bongiorni (ITA), David Tomasson (ISL)

20 July 2024
20:30

Boxscore

France	69–57	Greece
Scoring by quarter: 21–11, 26–6, 12–26, 10–14
Pts: Three players 10; Rebs: Perrin 8 Asts: Perrin 5		Pts: Samodurov 16; Rebs: Chitikoudis 10; Asts: Karakostas 4

Polsat Plus Arena
Attendance: 300
Referees: Marius Ciulin (ROU), Gintaras Maciulis (LTU), Arnau Padros (ESP)

=== 3rd place match ===
21 July 2024
18:00

Boxscore

Belgium	68–70	Greece
Scoring by quarter: 15–21, 25–10, 10–15, 18–24
Pts: Bryant Jr 19; Rebs: Missia-Dio 10; Asts: Meeusen 9		Pts: Konstantinidis 19; Rebs: Zougris 13; Asts: Karakostas, Konstantinidis 5

Polsat Plus Arena
Attendance: 400
Referees: Zafer Yilmaz (TUR), Jan Baloun (CZE), Andrea Bongiorni (ITA)

=== Final ===
21 July 2024
20:30

Boxscore

Slovenia	78–82	France
Scoring by quarter: 20–22, 22–15, 17–17, 19–28
Pts: Klavzar 23; Rebs: Todorovic, Macura 5 Asts: Belko 5		Pts: Perrin 19; Rebs: Penda 14; Asts: Perrin, Penda 5

Polsat Plus Arena
Attendance: 1,500
Referees: Georgios Poursanidis (GRE), Lorenzo Baldini (ITA), Lukasz Jankowski (POL)

== Final standings ==
Rank	Team	Record
1st place, gold medalist(s)	France	6–1
2nd place, silver medalist(s)	Slovenia	6–1
3rd place, bronze medalist(s)	Greece	4–3
4	Belgium	4–3
5	Lithuania	5–2
6	Czech Republic	2–5
7	Spain	5–2
8	Poland	2–5
9	Italy	5–2
10	Israel	4–3
11	Serbia	4–3
12	Germany	3–4
13	Iceland	3–4
14	Turkey	2–6
15	North Macedonia	1–6
16	Montenegro	0–7

Relegated to the 2025 FIBA U20 EuroBasket Division B

== Statistics and awards ==
=== Statistical leaders ===
==== Players ====
Points

Name	PPG
(Czech Republic) Jakub Nečas	18.6
(Lithuania) Paulius Murauskas	18.1
(Turkey) Emre Melih Tunca	17.6
(Iceland) Tomas Thrastarson	16.3
(Slovenia) Urban Klavzar	16.1
(Iceland) Almar Atlason	16.1

Rebounds

Name	RPG
(Belgium) Nathan Missia-Dio	10.6
(Lithuania) Paulius Murauskas	10.3
(Lithuania) Motiejus Krivas	8.9
(France) Noah Penda	8.6
(Czech Republic) Jakub Nečas	8.4
(Lithuania) Matas Vokietaitis	8.4

Assists

Name	APG
(Israel) Noam Yaacov	7.2
(Iceland) Daniel Halldorsson	7.0
(Turkey) Emre Melih Tunca	6.4
(Belgium) Noah Meeusen	6.3
(France) Alexandre Bouzidi	5.4

Blocks

Name	BPG
(Lithuania) Motiejus Krivas	2.1
(Iceland) Almar Atlason	1.9
(Greece) Alexandros Samodurov	1.9
(Italy) Leonardo Faggian	1.8
(Spain) Aday Mara	1.7

Steals

Name	SPG
(Italy) Leonardo Faggian	2.7
(North Macedonia) Petar Boshaleski	2.6
(Iceland) Daniel Halldorsson	2.1
(France) Roman Domon	2.0
(Poland) Jakub Andrzejewski	2.0
(North Macedonia) Nenad Jovanovikj	2.0

Efficiency

Name	EFFPG
(Lithuania) Paulius Murauskas	22.7
(Spain) Izan Almansa	21.0
(Czech Republic) Jakub Nečas	20.9
(Lithuania) Motiejus Krivas	20.0
(France) Noah Penda	18.9

==== Teams ====
Points

Team	PPG
Lithuania	84.0
Spain	83.9
France	82.6
Slovenia	81.7
Iceland	80.9

Rebounds

Team	RPG
Lithuania	51.6
Spain	43.0
Czech Republic	42.6
Serbia	41.3
Turkey	41.1

Assists

Team	APG
Spain	24.9
Iceland	21.7
Turkey	21.3
France	20.6
Germany	19.9

Blocks

Team	BPG
Italy	6.0
Iceland	5.0
Lithuania	4.9
Greece	4.7
Turkey	4.6

Steals

Team	SPG
Spain	13
Italy	11.1
North Macedonia	10.1
France	9.9
Slovenia	9.7

Efficiency

Team	EFFPG
Spain	108.0
Lithuania	95.9
France	95.6
Serbia	91.3
Slovenia	91.3

=== Awards ===
The awards were announced on 21 July 2024.

Award	Player
All-Tournament Team	(France) Zacharie Perrin
All-Tournament Team	(France) Noah Penda
All-Tournament Team	(Slovenia) Urban Klavzar
All-Tournament Team	(Greece) Vangelis Zougris
All-Tournament Team	(Belgium) Nathan Missia-Dio
Most Valuable Player	(France) Zacharie Perrin
