= Vranjković =

Vranjković (Serbian: Врањковић) is a surname. Notable people with the surname include:

- Marko Vranjković (born 1990), Slovenian basketball player
- Vojislav Vranjković (born 1983), Serbian footballer
