= Asim Đulović =

Serbian basketball player (born 2005)

No. 33 – Butler Bulldogs
- Position: Small Forward
- League: Big East Conference

Personal information
- Born: 30 July 2005 (age 21) Novi Pazar, Serbia, Serbia and Montenegro
- Listed height: 2.05 m (6 ft 9 in)

Career information
- College: Butler University
- Playing career: 2022–present

Career history
- 2022–2026: Mega Basket
- 2022–2025: →OKK Beograd

Career highlights
- Euroleague NGT champion (2022); Junior ABA League champion (2022)

Asim Đulović (Serbian Cyrillic: Асим Ђуловић; born 30 July 2005) is a Serbian college basketball player for the Butler Bulldogs of the Big East Conference. He previously played for Mega Superbet of the Serbian League (KLS) and the ABA League. Standing at 2.05 m (6 ft 8 1/2 in), he plays at the small forward and shooting guard positions. He also represents the Serbia national team.

== Early career ==
Đulović began his basketball development in his hometown of Novi Pazar before joining the youth system of Mega Basket. He was part of the Mega cadet team that won the Serbian Championship in 2022, where he was named the Most Valuable Player (MVP) of the Final Tournament. That same year, he also won the Junior ABA League with Mega Basket.

He participated in two editions of the Euroleague Basketball Next Generation Tournament with Mega Basket. In the 2021–22 season, Mega won the tournament, with Đulović averaging 14 points and 4.3 rebounds per game. In the 2022–23 season, he averaged 15 points and 3.9 rebounds per game.

== Professional career ==
Đulović made his professional debut during the 2022–23 season, joining OKK Beograd in the Basketball League of Serbia at the age of 17. In the 2024–25 season, he was selected to the league’s mid-season Best Five. He finished the season averaging 18.2 points, 6.5 rebounds, and 2.6 assists in 27.8 minutes per game.

On 29 April 2025, Đulović declared for the 2025 NBA draft. On 6 April 2026, Ðulović committed to play for Butler University.

== National team career ==
=== Junior national team ===
Đulović represented Serbia U17 at the 2022 FIBA Under-17 Basketball World Cup, helping the team finish in fifth place while averaging 10.6 points, 4.4 rebounds, and 1.4 assists per game. He also played for the Serbia U20 at the 2024 FIBA U20 European Championship.

=== Senior national team ===
In February 2025, Đulović was called up to the Serbian national team for the EuroBasket qualifying games against Finland and Georgia. He made his senior debut against Georgia, recording 5 points and 2 rebounds in 20 minutes of play.
