= 2021–22 Icelandic Men's Basketball Cup =

Basketball competition in Iceland

2021–2022 Bikarkeppni Karla
Tournament details
- Arena: Smárinn (Final); Kópavogur, Iceland
- Dates: 17 October 2021 – 19 March 2022

Final positions
- Champions: Stjarnan
- Runners-up: Þór Þorlákshöfn

Awards and statistics
- MVP: (Slovenia) David Gabrovšek

The 2021–2022 Bikarkeppni karla, named Vís bikarinn for sponsorship reasons, was the 56th edition of the Icelandic Men's Basketball Cup, won by Stjarnan against Þór Þorlákshöfn. The competition was managed by the Icelandic Basketball Association (KKÍ) and the cup final was played in Smárinn, Kópavogur, and broadcast live on RÚV. David Gabrovšek was named the Cup Finals MVP after turning in 29 points and 7 rebounds.

== Bracket ==
Quarterfinals
12 December
ÍR	77
Þór Þorlákshöfn	79
12 December
Stjarnan	85
Grindavík	76
13 December
Keflavík	101
Haukar	92
13 December
Valur	72
Njarðvík	71

Semifinals
16 March
Þór Þorlákshöfn	90
Valur	85
16 March
Stjarnan	95
Keflavík	93

Final
19 March
Stjarnan	93
Þór Þorlákshöfn	85

== Cup Finals MVP ==
Pos.	Player	Team
Forward	(Slovenia) David Gabrovšek	Stjarnan
