= Damjan Novaković =

Slovenian basketball coach (born 1966)

Rogaška
- Position: Head Coach

Personal information
- Born: 30 September 1966 (age 60) Mostar, SR Bosnia and Herzegovina, SFR Yugoslavia

Career information
- Playing career: 1984–2005
- Coaching career: 2005–present

Career history

Playing
- Lokomotiva Mostar
- Borac Banja Luka
- Široki
- 1991–1997: Rogaška Donat MG
- 1997–2003: Šentjur
- 2003–2004: Zagorje
- 2004–2005: Šentjur

Coaching
- 2005–2007: Alpos Kemoplast Šentjur
- 2007–2008: Pivovarna Laško
- 2008–2013: Alpos/Tajfun Šentjur
- 2013–2023: Rogaška
- 2013–2015: Slovenia U20
- 2023–2024: Kansai Helios Domžale
- 2024: HKK Mostar
- 2024–: Rogaška

Damjan Novaković (born 30 September 1966) is a Slovenian basketball coach and former player. He currently serves as a head coach for the Rogaška of the Slovenian Basketball League and the Adriatic Second League.

== Playing career ==
Novaković started to play basketball for his hometown team Lokomotiva. Later, he also played for Borac Banja Luka and Široki Brijeg.

In 1991, Novaković moved to Rogaška Slatina, Slovenia. There he played 1st-tyer Slovenian League for the Rogaška Donat MG, Šentjur and Zagorje from Zagorje ob Savi.

== Coaching career ==
After retiring from basketball as a player in 2005, Novaković became head coach for Šentjur, coaching them for the 2005–06 and 2006–07 season. During 2007–08 season, he coached Pivovarna Laško. For the 2008–09 season, he moved back to Šentjur and coached them until the end of 2012–13 season.

On 13 July 2013 Novaković was hired to be the head coach of the Rogaška.

=== National team ===
Novaković coached Slovenia men's national under-20 basketball team from 2013 to 2015. He coached them for the 2013, 2014 and 2015 FIBA Europe Under-20 Championship.
