= Dejan Jakara =

Slovenian basketball coach (born 1986)

BC Krka
- Title: Head coach
- League: Montenegrin League; ABA League

Personal information
- Born: 11 February 1986 (age 40) Kranj, SR Slovenia, Yugoslavia
- Listed height: 1.91 m (6 ft 3 in)

Career information
- NBA draft: 2008: undrafted
- Playing career: 2003–2010
- Position: Shooting guard
- Coaching career: 2013–present

Career history

Coaching
- 2013–2015: Janče
- 2015–2017: Helios Suns (assistant)
- 2017–2018: Brno
- 2018–2023: Helios Suns
- 2023–2024: SC Derby
- 2024–present: BC Krka

Career highlights
- Montenegrin Cup winner (2024)

Dejan Jakara (born 11 February 1986) is a Slovenian professional basketball coach and former player, who is the head coach of BC Krka of the Prva A Liga and the Adriatic League.

== Early life ==
A shooting guard, Jakara played in Slovenia from 2003 to 2010. During his playing days, he played for Triglav Kranj, Šenčur, and KK Janče Ljubljana among others. He retired as a player with Janče in 2010.

Jakara was a member of the Slovenia U18 team that played qualifications for the 2004 FIBA Europe Under-18 Championship.

== Coaching career ==
In July 2017, mmcité Brno of the Czech NBL hired Jakara as their new head coach. In November 2018, Brno parted ways with him.

On 12 November 2018, the Helios Suns hired Jakara as their new head coach, following departure of Jovan Beader. In May 2020, he signed a contract extension for the 2020–21 season. Also, he extended his contract with the Suns for the 2021–22 season.

On 19 November 2023, he officially signed a contract as a head coach with SC Derby.

== National team coaching career ==
In 2014, Jakara was an assistant coach of the Slovenia U18 team at the 2014 FIBA Europe Under-18 Championship Division B in Bulgaria.

In 2019, he was the coach of the Slovenia U20 team at the 2019 FIBA U20 European Championship in Tel Aviv, Israel, finishing 12th with a 3–4 record. Also, he led the U20 team at the 2021 FIBA U20 European Challengers. His team went undefeated with a 5–0 record and won the Group C.

== Career achievements ==
As assistant coach

- Slovenian First League champion: 1 (with Helios Suns: 2015–16)
- Alpe Adria Cup winner: 1 (with Helios Suns: 2015–16)
