= Vangelis Zougris =

Greek basketball player (born 2004)

Saint Mary's Gaels
- Position: Center / power forward
- Conference: West Coast Conference

Personal information
- Born: October 14, 2004 (age 22) Peristeri, Athens, Greece
- Listed height: 6 ft 8 in (2.03 m)
- Listed weight: 240 lb (109 kg)

Career information
- High school: 1st General (Athens, Greece)
- College: Louisville (2025–2026); Saint Mary's (2026–present)
- Playing career: 2021–2025

Career history
- 2021–2025: Peristeri
Medals
Men's basketball
Representing Greece
FIBA Under-20 EuroBasket
Bronze medal – third place	2023 Greece	Under-20
Bronze medal – third place	2024 Poland	Under-20

Evangelos "Vangelis" Zougris (Greek: Ευάγγελος "Βαγγέλης" Ζούγρης, alternate spelling: Vaggelis; born October 14, 2004) is a Greek college basketball player for the Saint Mary's Gaels of the West Coast Conference (WCC). He previously played for the Louisville Cardinals. Zougris has also represented the senior men's Greek national team.

== Early life and youth career ==
Zougris was born on 14 October 2004, in Peristeri, a suburb of Athens, Greece. As a youth in Greece, the first competitive sport that Zougris participated in was football. He began playing football at the age of 6, when he joined the youth academies of the Greek club AO Kipoupoli. He played youth football with the club, at the position of centre-back, until the age of 15.

With the help of Sofia Kligkopoulou, who represented the senior Greek women's national basketball team at the 2004 Athens Summer Olympics, Zougris, at the age of 15, began his club basketball career, after he joined the youth teams of the Greek club Peristeri Athens, in 2018. Zougris attended the 13th General High School, in Peristeri, Athens, Greece.

== College career ==
After playing four seasons in Greece's top-tier level basketball league, the Greek Basketball League (GBL), from 2021 to 2025, Zougris moved to the United States to attend the University of Louisville. As a student athlete at Louisville, he decided to major in Finance and Accounting. As a member of the school's senior men's basketball team, the Louisville Cardinals, he played college basketball at the NCAA Division I level. Following his freshman season, Zougris transferred to Saint Mary's.

== Professional career ==
=== Peristeri Athens (2021–2025) ===
Zougris began his professional career with Peristeri Athens, during the Greek Basket League's 2021–22 season, after Peristeri's head coach, Milan Tomić, promoted him to the club's senior men's team. His pro debut came in a Greek Basket League game against the Greek EuroLeague club Olympiacos Piraeus, on 7 November 2021. In his first pro game, Zougris scored 2 points, in 2 minutes of playing time. In his first pro season, Zougris averaged 1.9 points, 1.6 rebounds, 0.3 assists, and 0.1 steals per game, in 7 games played, in Greece's top-tier level league.

Zougris, under the guidance of Peristeri head coach Vassilis Spanoulis, then made his debut in the secondary level European-wide competition, the FIBA Basketball Champions League Europe (FIBA BCL Europe), during the 2022–23 season. His first FIBA BCL Europe game was against the Lithuanian LKL League club Rytas Vilnius. In his first FIBA BCL Europe season, Zougris averaged 0.7 points, 1.7 rebounds, 0.3 assists, and 0.3 steals per game, in 3 games played. In the Greek Basket League's 2022–23 season, Zougris averaged 1.9 points, 0.9 rebounds, 0.5 steals, and 0.4 blocks per game, in 11 games played. With Peristeri, he also played in the Final of the 2022–23 edition of the Greek Cup.

In the 2023–24 FIBA BCL Europe season, Zougris averaged 1.3 points, 0.6 rebounds, 0.1 assists, 0.1 steals, and 0.1 blocks per game, in 10 games played. With Peristeri, he also played in the FIBA Champions League Europe's 2024 Final Four. In the Greek Basket League's 2023–24 season, Zougris averaged 2.0 points, 1.6 rebounds, 0.1 assists, 0.2 steals, and 0.2 blocks per game, in 27 games played.

After spending four seasons with Peristeri Athens, Zougris decided to move to the USA, in order to play college basketball with Louisville.

== National team career ==
=== Greek junior national team ===
As a member of the Greek under-18 junior national team, Zougris played at the 2021 FIBA Under-18 European Challengers, where he averaged 4.8 points, 7.4 rebounds, and 1.0 assists per game. He also played at the 2022 FIBA Under-18 EuroBasket, where he averaged 10.1 points, 6.9 rebounds, and 1.0 assists per game. As a member of the Greek under-20 junior national team, he played at the 2023 FIBA Under-20 EuroBasket. At the 2023 Under-20 EuroBasket, he averaged 14.4 points, 11.1 rebounds, 2.1 assists, 1.9 steals, and 1.0 blocks per game. As a result of his play, he was named to the competition's All-Star Five.

Zougris won another bronze medal with Greece at the 2024 FIBA Under-20 EuroBasket. He averaged 11.6 points, 8.3 rebounds, 1.7 assists, 1.7 steals, and 1.4 blocks per game at the tournament. At the conclusion of the competition, he was named to the All-Star Five.

=== Greek senior national team ===
In July 2023, at the age of 18, Zougris became a member of the senior men's Greek national team for the first time, when he was selected by Greece's head coach at the time, Dimitris Itoudis, to Greece's 18 man preliminary training camp roster for the 2023 FIBA World Cup. After that, Zougris represented Greece at the 2025 FIBA EuroBasket Qualifiers, playing under Greece's head coach Vassilis Spanoulis. Zougris debuted with Greece's senior men's team, at the 2025 EuroBasket Qualifiers, on 26 February 2024, in a game against the Dutch national team. Greece won the game, by a score of 74–72.

== Awards and accomplishments ==
=== Pro career ===
- Greek Cup Finalist: 2023
- FIBA Champions League Europe Final Four: 2024

=== Greek junior national team ===
- 2023 FIBA Under-20 EuroBasket: Bronze
- 2023 FIBA Under-20 EuroBasket: All-Star Five
- 2024 FIBA Under-20 EuroBasket: Bronze
- 2024 FIBA Under-20 EuroBasket: All-Star Five
