= Matas Vokietaitis =

Lithuanian basketball player (born 2004)

No. 8 – Texas Longhorns
- Position: Center
- League: Southeastern Conference

Personal information
- Born: November 5, 2004 (age 22) Marijampolė, Lithuania
- Listed height: 7 ft 0 in (2.13 m)
- Listed weight: 255 lb (116 kg)

Career information
- College: Florida Atlantic (2024–2025); Texas (2025–present)
- Playing career: 2021–present

Career history
- 2021–2024: Žalgiris Kaunas
- 2021–2023: →BC Žalgiris-3
- 2022–2024: →BC Žalgiris-2

Career highlights
- AAC Freshman of the Year (2025)

Matas Vokietaitis (born November 5, 2004) is a Lithuanian college basketball player for the Texas Longhorns of the Southeastern Conference (SEC). He previously played for the Florida Atlantic Owls.

== Early life and career ==
Vokietaitis was born in Marijampolė, Lithuania and early in his career mostly played for the reserve teams of Žalgiris Kaunas: BC Žalgiris-3 of the Regional Basketball League and BC Žalgiris-2 of the National Basketball League. On 17 March 2024, Vokietaitis debuted in the senior Žalgiris Kaunas team during a Lithuanian Basketball League game versus the Pieno žvaigždės Pasvalys and scored five points, grabbed two rebounds, and blocked one shot.

== College career ==
=== Freshman season ===
In May 2024, Vokietaitis committed to the Florida Atlantic University and in the 2024–2025 NCAA season played for the Florida Atlantic Owls. Vokietis played in all 34 games for the Owls and was a part of the starting five in 20 games, his averages were 10.2 points, 5.4 rebounds, 0.8 blocks, 0.3 assists, 0.2 steals per game. In the 2025 American Athletic Conference men's basketball tournament the Owls were eliminated 83–76 in the quarterfinal by the Tulane Green Wave. Vokietaitis was named the American Athletic Conference Men's Basketball Freshman of the Year. His successful freshman season attracted attention from other higher ranking universities of the National Collegiate Athletic Association.

=== Sophomore season ===
In April 2025, Vokietaitis during the NCAA transfer portal committed to the University of Texas and in the 2025–26 NCAA season played for the Texas Longhorns, where his playing time and statistical numbers per game further increased. On 5 November 2025, he debuted as a Longhorns member versus the Duke Blue Devils and as a starter recorded 15 points, eight rebounds, one block, but his team lost 60–75. On 9 December 2025, he scored his NCAA career-high 28 points.

In the First Four round 68–66 win against the NC State Wolfpack, Vokietaitis recorded 15 points and eight rebounds. In the first round of the 2026 NCAA tournament, he recorded 23 points, 16 rebounds (including a (NCAA career-high nine offensive rebounds), one assist, and one block, leading to a 79–71 upset victory versus the 6-seed BYU Cougars led by AJ Dybantsa. Vokietaitis became the first in Longhorns history to record at least 20 points and 15 rebounds in an NCAA Tournament game. In the Round of 32, the Longhorns had another 74–68 upset victory against the 3-seed Gonzaga Bulldogs, with Vokietaitis recording 17 points, nine rebounds, and two assists. In a post-game press conference, Vokietaitais said "I don't care who I'm playing against. I just try to play hard, with confidence. In my eyes, I'm the best center in the league. That's the key to play like that", while his head coach Sean Miller added that "he has really done an amazing job here". In the Sweet Sixteen buzzer beater 77–79 loss against the 2-seed Purdue Boilermakers, Vokietaitis recorded nine points, two rebounds, and one block.

=== Junior season ===
On November 3, 2026, Vokietaitis began his third NCAA season by scoring 22 points (9/9 two-point fields goals), becoming the first player in Texas Longhorns history to score at least 20 points without missing a field goal.

== National team career ==
Vokietaitis played for the Lithuania men's national under-18 team and the under-20 teams. His best performance statistically in the FIBA's youth tournaments was in the 2024 FIBA U20 EuroBasket where he averaged 11.3 points, 8.4 rebounds, 0.4 assists, and 1.3 blocks per game, but Lithuania was eliminated 87–82 in the quarterfinal by Greece.

== Career statistics ==
Legend
| GP | Games played | GS | Games started | MPG | Minutes per game |
| FG% | Field goal percentage | 3P% | 3-point field goal percentage | FT% | Free throw percentage |
| RPG | Rebounds per game | APG | Assists per game | SPG | Steals per game |
| BPG | Blocks per game | PPG | Points per game | **Bold** | Career high |

=== College ===
| Year | Team | GP | GS | MPG | FG% | 3P% | FT% | RPG | APG | SPG | BPG | PPG |
|---|---|---|---|---|---|---|---|---|---|---|---|---|
| 2024–25 | FAU | 34 | 20 | 17.6 | .677 | - | .636 | 5.4 | 0.3 | 0.2 | 0.8 | 10.2 |
| 2025–26 | Texas | 36 | 36 | 26.0 | .619 | - | .669 | 7.1 | 0.6 | 0.2 | 0.9 | 15.6 |
| Career | | 70 | 56 | 21.9 | .641 | - | .658 | 6.3 | 0.5 | 0.2 | 0.8 | 13.0 |

== Personal life ==
Vokietaitis is fluent in Lithuanian, English, and Russian. His mother Neringa Vokietaitienė played basketball and represented the Lithuania women's national basketball teams in age-restricted youth tournaments. He wears number eight in recognition of his father Algirdas' birthday (8 July).
