= Marko Jošilo =

Serbian-Bosnian basketball player

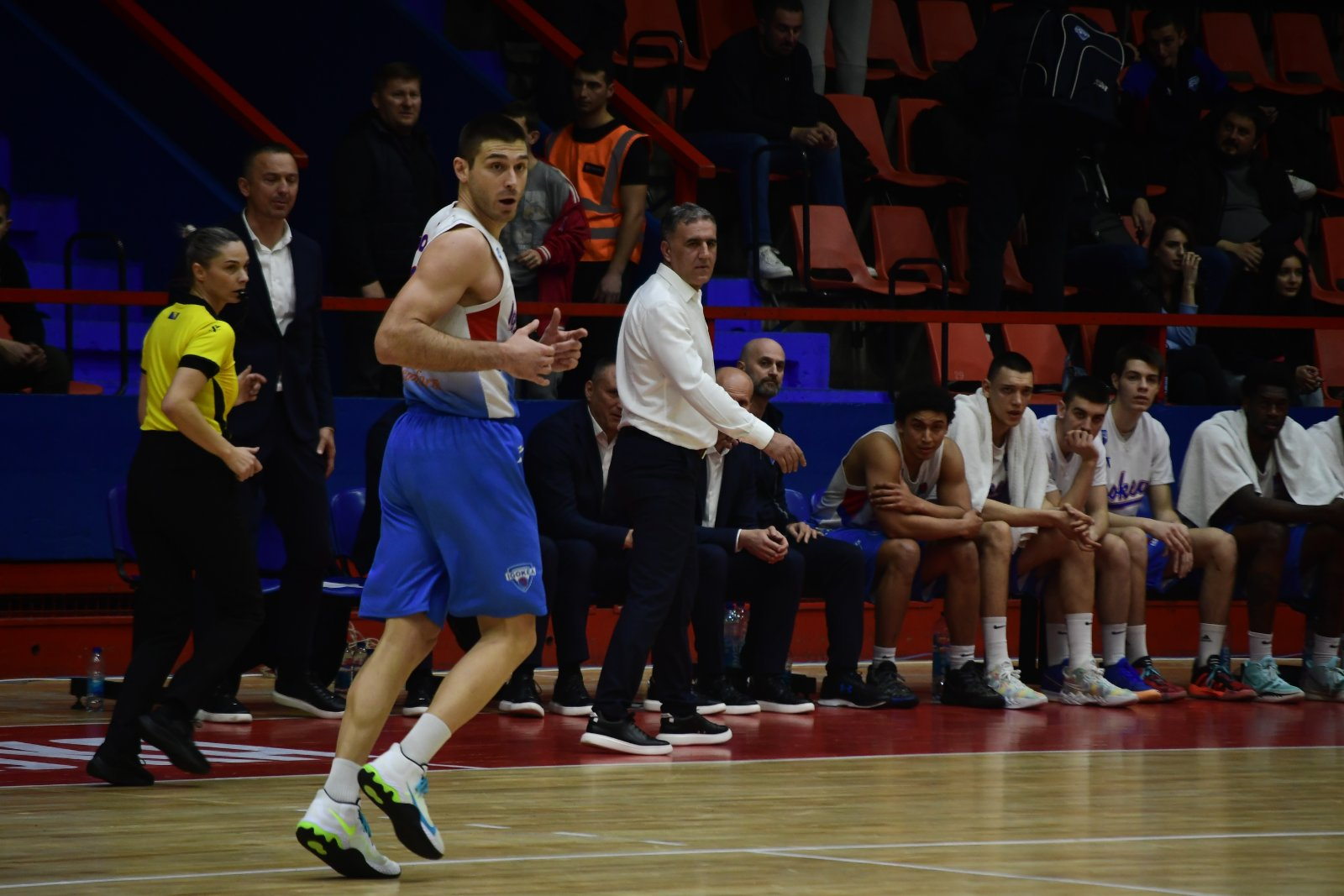
- Jošilo (close-up) with Igokea in 2022

No. 10 – Borac Čačak
- Position: Small forward / power forward
- League: Basketball League of Serbia

Personal information
- Born: October 16, 1992 (age 34) Čačak, Serbia, FR Yugoslavia
- Listed height: 2.00 m (6 ft 7 in)

Career information
- NBA draft: 2014: undrafted
- Playing career: 2011–present

Career history
- 2011: Partizan
- 2012–2013: Varda Višegrad
- 2013: Radnik Bijeljina
- 2013–2014: Varda Višegrad
- 2014: Igokea
- 2014–2017: Metalac
- 2017: Bosna
- 2017–2020: Krka
- 2020–2024: Igokea
- 2025–present: Borac Čačak

Career highlights
- 3× Bosnian League champion (2014, 2022, 2023); 3× Bosnian Cup winner (2021–2023); ABA Liga 2 Final Four MVP (2018)

Marko Jošilo (Serbian Cyrillic: Марко Јошило, born 16 October 1992) is a Serbian-Bosnian professional basketball player for Borac Čačak of the Basketball League of Serbia and the ABA League. He has previously played for Igokea.
