= David Gabrovšek =

Slovenian basketball player

Pielle Livorno
- Position: Power forward / center / small forward

Personal information
- Born: 18 September 1994 (age 32) Ljubljana, Slovenia
- Listed height: 6 ft 8.25 in (2.04 m)
- Listed weight: 224 lb (102 kg)

Career information
- College: Southwest Baptist (2013–2015); Missouri Baptist (2015–2017)
- NBA draft: 2017: undrafted
- Playing career: 2017–present

Career history
- 2017–2018: Šentjur
- 2018–2019: Ilirija
- 2019–2020: Terme Olimia Podcetrtek
- 2020: Novosibirsk
- 2020–2021: Rogaška
- 2021–2022: Stjarnan
- 2022–2023: Karditsa
- 2023–2025: Donar
- 2025–present: Pielle Livorno

Career highlights
- Icelandic Cup MVP (2022); Icelandic Cup winner (2022)

David Gabrovšek (born 18 September 1994) is a Slovenian professional basketball player who plays for Pielle Livorno of the Serie B.

== College career ==
Gabrovšek played college basketball with Southwest Baptist and Missouri Baptist from 2013 to 2017.

== Professional career ==
On July 30, 2020, he joined Rogaška.

In May 2022, Gabrovšek was named the Icelandic Cup after turning in 29 points and 7 rebounds in Stjarnan's 93–85 cup finals victory against Þór Þorlákshöfn.

On August 12, 2022, Gabrovšek moved to Karditsa of the Greek Basket League. In 20 league games, he averaged 6.7 points, 1.8 rebounds and 1 assist in 16 minutes per contest.
