= Miro Alilović =

Slovenian basketball coach

Cedevita Olimpija
- Position: Assistant coach
- League: Slovenian League; ABA League; EuroCup

Personal information
- Born: 28 February 1977 (age 49) Kamnik, SR Slovenia, Yugoslavia
- Coaching career: 2001–present

Career history

Coaching
- 2001–2008: Geoplin Slovan (youth)
- 2008–2010: Geoplin Slovan
- 2010–2011: Union Olimpija (assistant)
- 2011: Union Olimpija
- 2011–2013: Union Olimpija (assistant)
- 2013: Union Olimpija
- 2014–2017: USK Praha
- 2017–2018: Primorska (youth)
- 2019–2021: Dynamic Belgrade
- 2021–present: Cedevita Olimpija (assistant)

Career highlights
- As Assistant Coach: Slovenian League winner (2022); 3× Slovenian Cup winner (2012, 2013, 2022)
Medals
Men's basketball
Head coach for Slovenia
European U-20 Championship
Bronze medal – third place	2006 Turkey	U20 Team
Assistant coach for Slovenia
European U-20 Championship
Gold medal – first place	2004 Czech Republic	U20 Team

Mirsad "Miro" Alilović (born 28 February 1977) is a Slovenian professional basketball coach who is an assistant coach for Cedevita Olimpija of the Slovenian League, ABA League and the EuroCup.

== Coaching career ==
Alilović coached Slovenian clubs Geoplin Slovan and Union Olimpija.

On 10 April 2019, Alilović was named as a head coach for the Serbian club Dynamic Belgrade. In February 2021, Dynamic Belgrade parted ways with him.
