= Almar Orri Atlason =

Icelandic basketball player (born 2004)

No. 11 – Miami RedHawks
- Position: Small forward
- League: Mid American Conference

Personal information
- Born: 28 December 2004 (age 21)
- Listed height: 204 cm (6 ft 8 in)
- Listed weight: 106.5 kg (235 lb)

Career information
- High school: Sunrise Christian Academy (Bel Aire, Kansas, U.S.)
- College: Bradley (2023–2025); Miami (Ohio) (2025–present)
- Playing career: 2020–present

Career history
- 2020–2022: KR

Career highlights
- MVC All-Freshman team (2024)

Almar Orri Atlason (born 28 December 2004) is an Icelandic college basketball player for the Miami RedHawks of the Mid-American Conference. He also plays for the Icelandic national team programs.

== Career ==
Almar Orri played up through the junior ranks of KR before heading to Italy in 2019 where he joined A.S. Stella Azzurra. He returned to KR the following season and started his senior team career during the 2020–21 season.

In August 2022, Almar Orri joined Sunrise Christian Academy in Kansas, United States.

In April 2023, he announced that he joined Bradley University.

Prior to the 2025–26 season, Atlason transferred to Miami University.

== National team career ==
In August 2021, he was selected to the U-18 All-First team of the Nordic Tournament after averaging 14 points, 8 rebounds and 2 assists. In 2022, he led Iceland to the semi-finals of FIBA IBA U18 European Championship Division B after posting 22 points, 16 rebounds, 6 assists, 2 blocks in a win against Bosnia and Herzegovina. Following the tournament, he was selected to the FIBA Europe U-20 Championship Division B All-Tournament Team. In July 2022, he was selected to the 26-player training camp of the Icelandic senior national team.

On 30 June 2024, he led Iceland Under-20 team to its first Nordic championship with 40 points in a win against Finland Under-20 team.

== Career statistics ==
=== National team ===
Team	Tournament	Pos.	GP	PPG	RPG	APG
Iceland	EuroBasket 2025	22nd	2	1.0	0.5	0.0

== Awards and accomplishments ==
=== Individual awards ===
- FIBA Europe U-18 Championship Division B All-Tournament Team: 2022
- U-18 Nordic Championship's All-First Team: 2021
- U-20 Nordic Championship's All-First Team: 2022, 2023

== Personal life ==
Almar Orri is the younger brother of basketball coach Darri Freyr Atlason.
