= Urban Durnik =

Slovenian basketball player

No. 4 – KK Rogaška
- Position: Power forward / center
- League: Slovenian League

Personal information
- Born: June 19, 1997 (age 29) Trbovlje, Slovenia
- Listed height: 2.04 m (6 ft 8 in)
- Listed weight: 130 kg (287 lb)

Career information
- NBA draft: 2019: undrafted
- Playing career: 2014–present

Career history
- 2014–2018: Zlatorog Laško
- 2015–2016: →Hopsi Polzela
- 2018–2019: Helios Suns
- 2019–2020: Rogaška
- 2020: Koper Primorska
- 2021: Ilirija
- 2021–2022: Spars
- 2022–present: KK Rogaška

Urban Durnik (born June 19, 1997) is a Slovenian professional basketball player for KK Rogaška of the Slovenian League. He is a 2.04 m tall power forward and center.

== Professional career ==
Durnik started playing professional basketball for Zlatorog Laško.

In August 2018, Durnik signed with Helios Suns. On January 9, 2019, he parted ways with Helios Suns.

On January 16, 2019, He signed with Rogaška.
