= Matej Krušič =

Slovenian basketball player

Personal information
- Born: 7 May 1987 (age 39) Celje, SR Slovenia, SFR Yugoslavia
- Listed height: 2.08 m (6 ft 10 in)

Career information
- Playing career: 2004–2019
- Position: Center

Career history
- 2004–2007: Šentjur
- 2007–2009: Helios Domžale
- 2009–2011: Geoplin Slovan
- 2011–2012: Aris
- 2012–2013: Peñas Huesca
- 2013–2014: Grosuplje
- 2014–2015: USK Praha
- 2015–2017: Zlatorog Laško
- 2017–2018: Celje
- 2018–2019: Šentjur
Medals
Men's basketball
Representing Slovenia
European U-20 Championship
| Bronze medal – third place | 2006 Turkey | Team competition |

Matej Krušič is a Slovenian professional basketball player. Standing at 208 cm, he last played for KK Šentjur in the Liga Nova KBM.
