= Đorđe Simeunović =

Serbian basketball player

No. 3 – Fibwi Palma
- Positions: Small forward, power forward
- League: Primera FEB

Personal information
- Born: April 26, 1995 (age 31) Kruševac, Serbia, FR Yugoslavia
- Listed height: 2.01 m (6 ft 7 in)
- Listed weight: 101 kg (223 lb)

Career information
- NBA draft: 2017: undrafted
- Playing career: 2013–present

Career history
- 2013–2017: Mega Basket
- 2013–2014: →Smederevo 1953
- 2017–2018: Vršac
- 2018: FMP
- 2018–2019: OKK Beograd
- 2019–2020: Igokea
- 2020–2021: Napredak JKP
- 2021: Borac Banja Luka
- 2021–2022: Rouen Métropole
- 2022–2023: Básquet Coruña
- 2023–2024: Força Lleida
- 2024–2025: CB Tizona
- 2025–2026: KK Sloga
- 2026–present: Fibwi Palma

Đorđe Simeunović (Serbian Cyrillic: Ђорђе Симеуновић; born 26 April 1995) is a Serbian professional basketball player for Fibwi Palma of the Spanish Primera FEB.

== Professional career ==
In February 2021, Simeunović signed for the Bosnian team Borac Banja Luka. In August 2022, he signed for Leyma Básquet Coruña of the Spanish LEB Oro.
