= Dalibor Đapa =

Serbian basketball player

Zlatorog Laško
- Position: Power forward
- League: Slovenian League; ABA League

Personal information
- Born: October 23, 1984 (age 42) Apatin, SAP Vojvodina, SFR Yugoslavia
- Listed height: 2.05 m (6 ft 9 in)

Career information
- Playing career: 2001–present

Career history
- 2001–2005: Spartak Subotica
- 2005–2006: OKK Beograd
- 2006–2008: Swisslion Takovo
- 2008: Krka
- 2008: BC 93 Pulsar Rivne
- 2008: Odesa
- 2008: Budivelnyk
- 2009: Czarni Słupsk
- 2010: Parklji Bežigrad
- 2010–2011: Geoplin Slovan
- 2011: Vanoli Cremona
- 2011–2012: Kryvbasbasket-Lux Kryvyi Rih
- 2012–2013: U-Mobitelco Cluj-Napoca
- 2013–2014: Energia Rovinari Targu
- 2014: Alba Fehérvár
- 2015: BCM U Pitești
- 2015–2016: BC Timișoara
- 2016–2017: Targu Mureș
- 2017–2020: Krka
- 2020–2022: Šentjur
- 2022–2023: Joker
- 2023: Žoltasti Troti
- 2023–2024: Šenčur
- 2024–2025: Terme Olimia Podcetrtek
- 2025–present: Zlatorog Laško

Dalibor Đapa (born 23 October 1984) is a Serbian professional basketball player who plays as a Power forward for Zlatorog Laško of the Slovenian League.
