= Matej Venta =

Slovenian basketball player

Personal information
- Born: 19 March 1984 (age 42) Novo mesto, SFR Yugoslavia
- Listed height: 1.87 m (6 ft 2 in)

Career information
- Playing career: 2001–2014
- Position: Point guard

Career history
- 2001–2007: Krka Novo mesto
- 2007–2008: Mlékárna Kunín/Geofin
- 2008–2009: ČEZ Nymburg
- 2009: Krka Novo mesto
- 2009–2011: Hopsi Polzela
- 2011–2013: Prostějov
- 2013: Lions Jindřichův Hradec
- 2013–2014: Armex Dečin

Career highlights
- Slovenian League Champion (2003); Czech League champion (2009); Czech Cup winner (2009)

Matej Venta (born 19 March 1984) is a Slovenian retired professional basketball player. He played as a 1.87 m tall point guard.

Venta is now an entrepreneur, founder of Grosbasket, the largest basketball store in the region, with shops in Ljubljana, Zagreb, Budapest, and Verona.
