= Miha Škedelj =

Slovenian basketball player

No. 23 – Krka
- Position: Small forward
- League: Slovenian League; ABA League First Division

Personal information
- Born: May 29, 1999 (age 27) Novo Mesto, Slovenia
- Listed height: 2.02 m (6 ft 8 in)
- Listed weight: 100 kg (220 lb)

Career information
- NBA draft: 2021: undrafted
- Playing career: 2016–present

Career history
- 2016–present: Krka

Career highlights
- ABA League 2 champion (2018); Slovenian Cup winner (2021)

Miha Škedelj (born May 29, 1999 in Novo Mesto, Slovenia) is a Slovenian professional basketball player for Krka of the Slovenian League. He is a 2.02 m tall small forward.

== Professional career ==
Škedelj started playing professional basketball for Krka.

== International career ==
Škedelj made his debut for the Slovenian national team on February 22, 2019, at the 2019 FIBA Basketball World Cup qualification game against Turkey national team.
