= Maj Kovačevič =

Slovenian basketball player

No. 20 – Real Valladolid Baloncesto
- Position: Shooting guard
- League: LEB Oro

Personal information
- Born: 30 March 1990 (age 36) Novo Mesto, SR Slovenia, SFR Yugoslavia
- Listed height: 1.90 m (6 ft 3 in)
- Listed weight: 90 kg (198 lb)

Career information
- NBA draft: 2012: undrafted
- Playing career: 2006–present

Career history
- 2006–2010: Krka
- 2010–2011: Zlatorog Laško
- 2011–2012: Geoplin Slovan
- 2012–2013: SPU Nitra
- 2013–2014: Komárno
- 2014–2015: Pagrati
- 2015–2016: Široki
- 2016–2017: Zadar
- 2016: →Helios Suns
- 2017–2018: Krka
- 2018–2020: Split
- 2020–2021: Gorica
- 2021-2022: Split
- 2022-present: Real Valladolid Baloncesto

Maj Kovačevič (born March 30, 1990) is a former Slovenian professional basketball player who last played for Real Valladolid Baloncesto of the LEB Oro.
