= Jan Kosi =

Slovenian basketball player

No. 15 – Cedevita Olimpija
- Position: Power forward / center
- League: Slovenian League; ABA League

Personal information
- Born: October 18, 1996 (age 30) Slovenj Gradec, Slovenia
- Listed height: 2.04 m (6 ft 8 in)
- Listed weight: 91 kg (201 lb)

Career information
- NBA draft: 2018: undrafted
- Playing career: 2013–present

Career history
- 2013–2016: Elektra Šoštanj
- 2016–2020: Primorska
- 2020–2022: Krka
- 2022–present: Cedevita Olimpija

Career highlights
- 2× Slovenian League champion (2019, 2023); ABA League 2 champion (2019); 5× Slovenian Cup winner (2018–2021, 2023)

Jan Kosi (born October 18, 1996) is a Slovenian professional basketball player for Cedevita Olimpija of the Slovenian League. He is a 2.04 m tall Power forward.

== Professional career ==
Kosi started playing professional basketball for Elektra Šoštanj.

In September 2016, Kosi signed with Sixt Primorska.

On June 16, 2022, he has signed with Cedevita Olimpija of the Slovenian League.
