= Gëzim Morina =

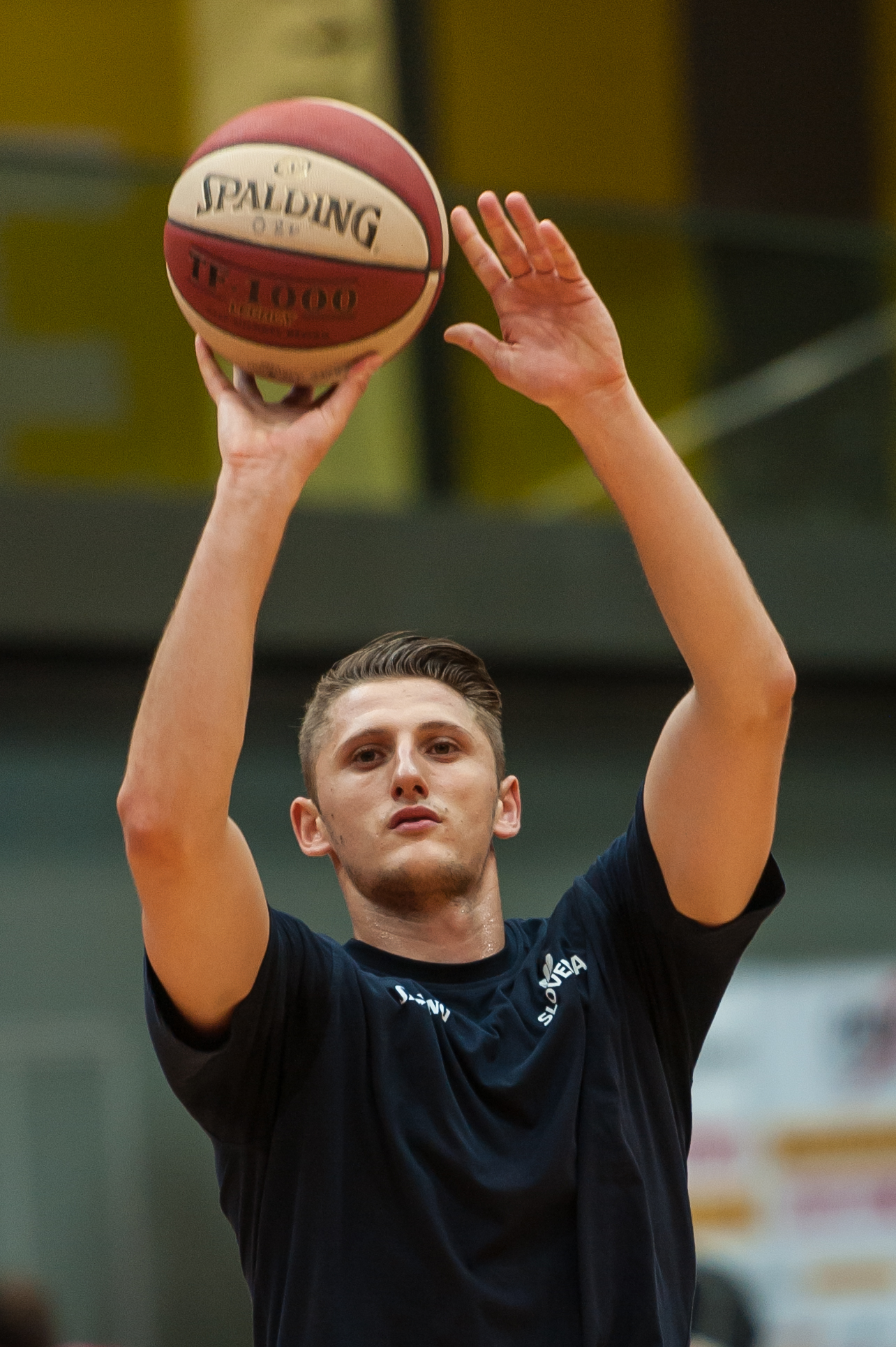
- Morina with Helios Suns in 2016

No. 6 – Ylli
- Position: Power forward
- League: Kosovo Basketball Superleague

Personal information
- Born: December 12, 1992 (age 33) Suva Reka, FR Yugoslavia (modern Kosovo)
- Listed height: 2.03 m (6 ft 8 in)
- Listed weight: 102 kg (225 lb)

Career information
- Playing career: 2010–present

Career history
- 2010–2012: Union Olimpija
- 2010–2011: →Škofja Loka
- 2011: →Hopsi Polzela
- 2012–2014: Helios Suns
- 2014–2015: Maribor Nova KBM
- 2015: Helios Suns
- 2015–2016: Sigal Prishtina
- 2016: Škofja Loka
- 2016–2018: Primorska
- 2018–2019: Šenčur GDD
- 2019–2020: Hopsi Polzela
- 2020–2021: Helios Suns
- 2021–present: Ylli

Career highlights
- 2x Slovenian Cup winner (2012, 2018); Kosovar Cup winner (2016); 2x Kosovo Basketball Superleague winner(2020–21, 2021–22); 2× Liga Unike winner (2021, 2026); Superkupa Unike winner (2021)

Gëzim Morina (born 12 December 1992) is a Kosovan-Slovenian professional basketball player for Ylli of the Kosovo Basketball Superleague. He grew up in Slovenia playing with Union Olimpija and their junior team. Morina and his childhood friend Erjon Kastrati helped Ylli to win Liga Unike and the Kosovo Basketball Superleague for the first time in the club's history.

Morina signed with Škofja Loka for the 2011–12 season, but on December 11, he signed with Union Olimpija instead. Morina played in the 2011 Slovenian All Star Game. He has also been a part of the Slovenian U-20 National Team.

== Professional career ==
In 2009 he joined with Erjon Kastrati Union Olipija youth system. In 2010–11 season Morina was loaned KK Skofja Loka in Slovenian First Division, where he averaged with 8.5 points, 4.1 rebounds and 0.4 blocks per game in 20 games played. In summer 2014 he signed with KK Maribor, but financial trouble Morina joined Helios Suns, where he averaged with 9.1 points, 5.4 rebounds and 1.1 assists per game in 19 games played.

In August 2015, Morina signed with KB Sigal Prishtina. With Sigal he played in regional (Balkan League) and FIBA Europe Cup. In February 2016 he helped win Kosovar Cup.

On February 24, 2016, he signed with KK Škofja Loka.

Morina spent the 2019–20 season with Slovenian side Hopsi Polzela, where he averaged 11.7 points and 6.1 rebounds per game. On July 14, 2020, he has signed with Helios Suns of the Slovenian League.

== International career ==
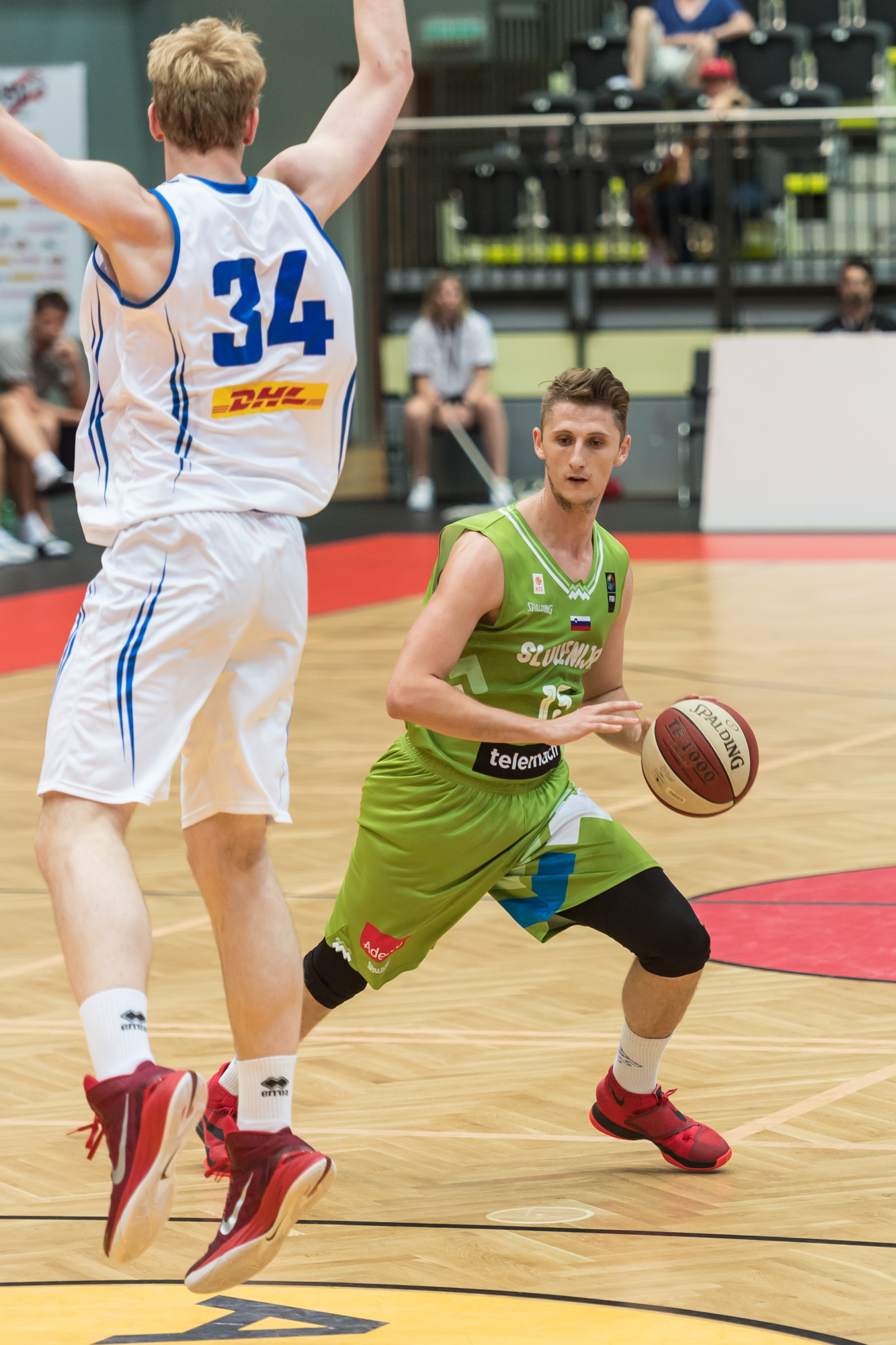
Morina with Slovenia in 2016

=== Slovenia ===
Morina played with Slovenia U20 in 2012 FIBA Europe Under-20 Championship and where he averaged with 7.5 points, 4.1 rebounds and 0.4 assists per game in 9 games played.

On 31 August 2016. Morina made his debut for Slovenia at the EuroBasket 2017 qualification match against Kosovo.

=== Kosovo ===
On 21 June 2017. Erolld Belegu, the president of Basketball Federation of Kosovo confirmed that Morina together with Erjon Kastrati will be part of Kosovo.
