= Urban Klavžar =

Slovenian basketball player (born 2004)

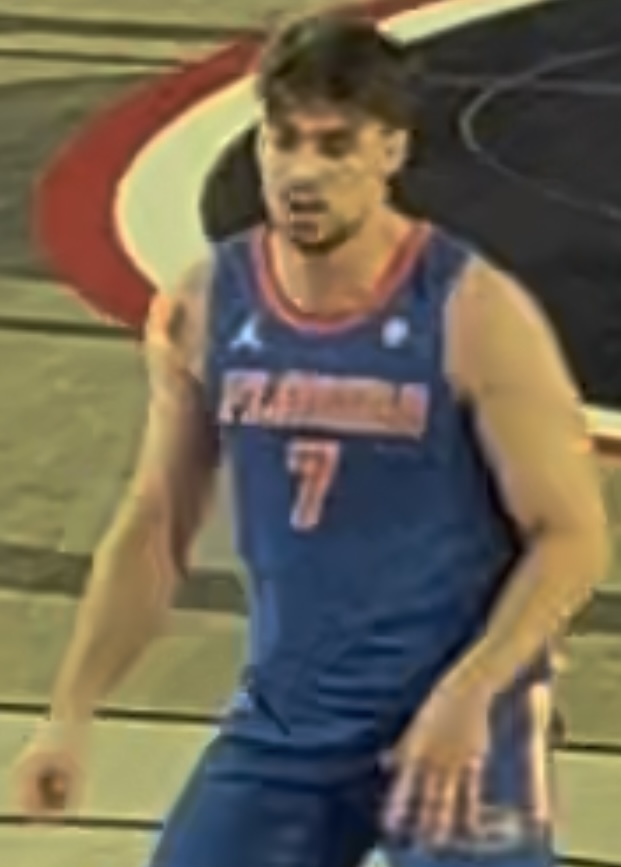
- Klavžar in 2025

No. 7 – Florida Gators
- Position: Point guard / shooting guard
- League: Southeastern Conference

Personal information
- Born: 27 May 2004 (age 21) Ljubljana, Slovenia
- Listed height: 1.86 m (6 ft 1 in)
- Listed weight: 88 kg (194 lb)

Career information
- College: Florida (2024–present)
- Playing career: 2021–present

Career history
- 2021–2022: Real Madrid
- 2022–2024: UCAM Murcia
- 2023–2024: →Grupo Alega Cantabria CBT

Career highlights
- NCAA champion (2025); SEC Sixth Man of the Year (2026)
Medals
Men's basketball
Representing Slovenia
FIBA Under-20 EuroBasket
Silver medal – second place	2024 Poland	Under-20

Urban Klavžar (born 27 May 2004) is a Slovenian professional basketball player for the Florida Gators. He is nicknamed “The Urban Legend”.

== Professional career ==
Klavzar made his professional debut for Real Madrid during the 2021–22 season.

On 9 July 2022 Klavžar signed a three-year contract with Spanish team UCAM Murcia. For the 2023–24 season he was loaned to Grupo Alega Cantabria CBT of the LEB Oro.

In 2025, Klavzar won the 2025 NCAA Championship.

== National team career ==
Klavžar made his debut for the Slovenian national team on November 11, 2022, at the 2023 FIBA Basketball World Cup qualification game against Israel national team.
