= Marko Vranjković =

Slovenian basketball player

Eagles Basket Palermo
- Position: Forward
- League: Serie C

Personal information
- Born: January 9, 1990 (age 36) Maribor, SFR Yugoslavia
- Listed height: 2.04 m (6 ft 8 in)
- Listed weight: 96 kg (212 lb)

Career information
- Playing career: 2008–present

Career history
- 2006–2010: MFC.2 Branik Maribor
- 2010–2011: Helios Domžale
- 2011–2012: AKK Branik Maribor
- 2012–2013: Hopsi Polzela
- 2014: Tajfun
- 2014–2016: BC Mess (Luxembourg N2)
- 2016: Parklji
- 2017: Cestistica Ostuni
- 2017–: Eagles Basket Palermo

Marko Vranjković (born January 9, 1990, in Maribor, SFR Yugoslavia) is a Slovenian professional basketball player. He is a 2.04 m (6 ft 8 in) tall forward.
