= 1994 FIBA Europe Under-20 Championship qualification =

This page describes the qualification procedure for 1994 FIBA Europe Under-20 Championship.

== Qualified teams ==
Qualified as the host nation:

- Slovenia

Qualified as the top teams in the previous tournament:

- France
- Greece
- Italy

Qualified through the Qualifying Round

- Belarus
- Finland
- Germany
- Israel
- Russia
- Slovakia
- Spain
- Turkey

== Qualification format ==
The Qualifying Round was held from 14 July to 1 August 1993. There were four groups, one group of five teams and three groups of six teams. The first and second placed team from each group qualified for 1994 FIBA Europe Under-20 Championship. One team of each group hosted the mini-tournament.

== Qualifying round ==
=== Group A ===
All the games were played in Helsinki, Finland.

Qualified for the Final Tournament

Team	Pts	W	L	PF	PA
Finland	9	4	1	448	369
Slovakia	9	4	1	439	395
Lithuania	8	3	2	456	417
England	7	2	3	358	407
Macedonia	6	1	4	355	444
Belgium	6	1	4	430	454

28 July
Slovakia	90–79	England
Macedonia	70–90	Lithuania
Belgium	96–90	Finland
29 July
Slovakia	87–83	Lithuania
Macedonia	87–83	Belgium
England	59–81	Finland
30 July
Lithuania	109–107	Belgium
England	80–61	Macedonia
Slovakia	82–85	Finland
31 July
Lithuania	97–61	England
Slovakia	89–66	Belgium
Finland	100–55	Macedonia
1 August
Slovakia	91–82	Macedonia
Belgium	78–79	England
Finland	92–77	Lithuania

=== Group B ===
All the games were played in Nyíregyháza, Hungary.

Qualified for the Final Tournament

Team	Pts	W	L	PF	PA
Russia	8	4	0	439	275
Germany	7	3	1	339	295
Hungary	6	2	2	319	342
Georgia	5	1	3	255	376
Sweden	4	0	4	308	372

27 July
Germany	84–71	Sweden
Hungary	101–69	Georgia
28 July
Sweden	79–104	Russia
Georgia	40–84	Germany
29 July
Germany	83–117	Russia
Hungary	105–86	Sweden
30 July
Georgia	79–72	Sweden
Hungary	46–99	Russia
31 July
Russia	119–67	Georgia
Hungary	67–88	Germany

=== Group C ===
All the games were played in Évora, Portugal.

Qualified for the Final Tournament

Team	Pts	W	L	PF	PA
Spain	10	5	0	457	289
Israel	9	4	1	412	314
Ukraine	8	3	2	422	372
Portugal	7	2	3	332	398
Iceland	6	1	4	325	400
Switzerland	5	0	5	288	463

14 July
Switzerland	52–107	Israel
Iceland	55–88	Spain
Portugal	73–74	Ukraine
15 July
Ukraine	90–96	Spain
Israel	80–65	Iceland
Portugal	85–73	Switzerland
16 July
Iceland	62–87	Ukraine
Switzerland	37–96	Spain
Portugal	52–80	Israel
17 July
Switzerland	64–75	Iceland
Portugal	41–103	Spain
Israel	79–71	Ukraine
18 July
Portugal	81–68	Iceland
Switzerland	62–100	Ukraine
Spain	74–66	Israel

=== Group D ===
All the games were played in Bursa, Turkey.

Qualified for the Final Tournament

Team	Pts	W	L	PF	PA
Turkey	10	5	0	395	341
Belarus	9	4	1	429	355
Poland	8	3	2	390	388
Croatia	7	2	3	439	434
Czech Republic	6	1	4	406	446
Romania	5	0	5	353	448

25 July
Belarus	86–62	Czech Republic
Romania	66–106	Croatia
Turkey	70–57	Poland
26 July
Romania	66–86	Belarus
Turkey	88–76	Czech Republic
Croatia	75–83	Poland
27 July
Romania	72–88	Poland
Turkey	72–66	Belarus
Croatia	91–85	Czech Republic
28 July
Croatia	84–104	Belarus
Turkey	69–59	Romania
Poland	91–84	Czech Republic
29 July
Romania	90–99	Czech Republic
Belarus	87–71	Poland
Turkey	96–83	Croatia
