= 2008 FIBA Europe Under-20 Championship Division B =

4th Division B Championship

Tournament details
- Host country: Romania
- Dates: August 1–10
- Teams: 19 (from 48 federations)
- Venue: 1 (in 1 host city)

Final positions
- Champions: Germany (1st title)

Tournament statistics
- Top scorer: (Norway) Oglesby (24.4)
- Top rebounds: (Romania) Nicoară (15.1)
- Top assists: (North Macedonia) Kostoski (6.4)
- PPG (Team): Germany (95.6)
- RPG (Team): Great Britain (44.4)
- APG (Team): Finland (16.7)

Official website
- www.fibaeurope.com

The 2008 FIBA Europe Under-20 Championship Division B was the fourth edition of the Division B of the FIBA Europe Under-20 Championship, the second-tier level of European Under-20 basketball. The city of Târgu Mureș, in Romania, hosted the tournament. Germany won their first title.

Germany and Belgium were promoted to Division A.

== Teams ==
- Austria
- Azerbaijan
- Belgium
- Czech Republic
- Estonia
- Finland
- Germany
- Great Britain
- Hungary
- Ireland
- Macedonia
- Netherlands
- Norway
- Poland
- Portugal
- Romania
- Slovakia
- Sweden
- Switzerland

== Preliminary round ==
The nineteen teams were allocated in four groups (three groups of five teams and one groups of four). The two top teams of each group advanced to the Qualifying Round. The third and fourth of each group to the Classification round. The last three teams in the five-team groups advanced to another group to determine the positions 17th to 19th.

Team advanced to Qualifying round
Team competed in Classification round
Team competed in Classification round for 17th to 19th place

=== Group A ===
Team	Pld	W	L	PF	PA	Pts	Tie-break
Portugal	4	4	0	309	277	8	
Macedonia	4	3	1	321	297	7	
Great Britain	4	1	3	302	314	5	1–1 (+4)
Norway	4	1	3	339	349	5	1–1 (+1)
Finland	4	1	3	298	332	5	1–1 (−5)

1 August 2008
Portugal	76–71	Macedonia	Târgu Mureș
Finland	73–90	Great Britain	Târgu Mureș
2 August 2008
Norway	87–99	Finland	Târgu Mureș
Great Britain	62–73	Portugal	Târgu Mureș
3 August 2008
Portugal	84–81	Norway	Târgu Mureș
Macedonia	80–75	Great Britain	Târgu Mureș
4 August 2008
Finland	63–76	Portugal	Târgu Mureș
Norway	83–91	Macedonia	Târgu Mureș
5 August 2008
Macedonia	79–63	Finland	Târgu Mureș
Great Britain	75–88	Norway	Târgu Mureș

=== Group B ===
Team	Pld	W	L	PF	PA	Pts
Germany	4	4	0	426	199	8
Sweden	4	3	1	362	284	7
Czech Republic	4	2	2	347	304	6
Ireland	4	1	3	224	366	5
Azerbaijan	4	0	4	202	408	4

1 August 2008
Germany	124–38	Azerbaijan	Târgu Mureș
Czech Republic	88–93	Sweden	Târgu Mureș
2 August 2008
Ireland	42–98	Czech Republic	Târgu Mureș
Sweden	64–90	Germany	Târgu Mureș
3 August 2008
Azerbaijan	44–100	Sweden	Târgu Mureș
Germany	112–40	Ireland	Târgu Mureș
4 August 2008
Ireland	80–51	Azerbaijan	Târgu Mureș
Czech Republic	57–100	Germany	Târgu Mureș
5 August 2008
Sweden	105–62	Ireland	Târgu Mureș
Azerbaijan	69–104	Czech Republic	Târgu Mureș

=== Group C ===
Team	Pld	W	L	PF	PA	Pts
Belgium	4	4	0	341	248	8
Estonia	4	3	1	340	300	7
Austria	4	2	2	298	382	6
Slovakia	4	1	3	243	287	5
Switzerland	4	0	4	239	324	4

1 August 2008
Estonia	87–61	Switzerland	Târgu Mureș
Belgium	91–60	Austria	Târgu Mureș
2 August 2008
Slovakia	47–75	Belgium	Târgu Mureș
Austria	86–93	Estonia	Târgu Mureș
3 August 2008
Switzerland	60–77	Austria	Târgu Mureș
Estonia	79–67	Slovakia	Târgu Mureș
4 August 2008
Slovakia	71–58	Switzerland	Târgu Mureș
Belgium	86–81	Estonia	Târgu Mureș
5 August 2008
Switzerland	60–89	Belgium	Târgu Mureș
Austria	75–58	Slovakia	Târgu Mureș

=== Group D ===
Team	Pld	W	L	PF	PA	Pts
Netherlands	3	2	1	211	200	5
Romania	3	2	1	202	199	5
Hungary	3	1	2	186	202	4
Poland	3	1	2	210	208	4

1 August 2008
Netherlands	82–66	Hungary	Târgu Mureș
Romania	82–76	Poland	Târgu Mureș
3 August 2008
Poland	76–64	Netherlands	Târgu Mureș
Hungary	58–62	Romania	Târgu Mureș
5 August 2008
Poland	58–62	Hungary	Târgu Mureș
Netherlands	65–58	Romania	Târgu Mureș

== Qualifying round ==
The eight top teams were allocated in two groups of four teams each. Teams coming from the same initial group didn't play again vs. each other, but "carried" the results of the matches played between them for the first round.

Team advanced to Semifinals
Team competed in 5th–8th playoffs

=== Group E ===
Team	Pld	W	L	PF	PA	Pts	Tie-break
Germany	3	3	0	242	201	6	
Sweden	3	1	2	211	231	4	1–1 (+6)
Macedonia	3	1	2	221	224	4	1–1 (+3)
Portugal	3	1	2	204	222	4	1–1 (−9)

6 August 2008
Portugal	66–80	Sweden	Târgu Mureș
Macedonia	75–81	Germany	Târgu Mureș
7 August 2008
Germany	71–62	Portugal	Târgu Mureș
Sweden	67–75	Macedonia	Târgu Mureș

=== Group F ===
Team	Pld	W	L	PF	PA	Pts
Belgium	3	3	0	255	232	6
Estonia	3	2	1	239	237	5
Netherlands	3	1	2	202	211	4
Romania	3	0	3	223	239	3

6 August 2008
Estonia	69–65	Netherlands	Târgu Mureș
Belgium	85–79	Romania	Târgu Mureș
7 August 2008
Netherlands	72–84	Belgium	Târgu Mureș
Romania	86–89	Estonia	Târgu Mureș

== Classification round ==
The third and fourth team of each of the preliminary round groups were allocated in two groups of four teams each. Teams coming from the same initial group didn't play again vs. each other, but "carried" the results of the matches played between them for the first round.

Team advanced to 9th–12th playoffs
Team competed in 13th–16th playoffs

=== Group G ===
Team	Pld	W	L	PF	PA	Pts
Czech Republic	3	3	0	293	215	6
Norway	3	2	1	262	223	5
Great Britain	3	1	2	252	258	4
Ireland	3	0	3	165	276	3

6 August 2008
Great Britain	84–66	Ireland	Târgu Mureș
Norway	80–91	Czech Republic	Târgu Mureș
7 August 2008
Czech Republic	104–93	Great Britain	Târgu Mureș
Ireland	57–94	Norway	Târgu Mureș

=== Group H ===
Team	Pld	W	L	PF	PA	Pts
Austria	3	2	1	228	204	5
Hungary	3	2	1	206	202	5
Slovakia	3	1	2	185	213	4
Poland	3	1	2	198	198	4

6 August 2008
Austria	68–74	Poland	Târgu Mureș
Slovakia	59–72	Hungary	Târgu Mureș
7 August 2008
Hungary	72–85	Austria	Târgu Mureș
Poland	66–68	Slovakia	Târgu Mureș

== Classification round for 17th to 19th place ==
The last three teams of the five-team groups of the preliminary round were allocated in one group.

=== Group I ===
Team	Pld	W	L	PF	PA	Pts
Switzerland	2	2	0	165	130	4
Finland	2	1	1	198	138	3
Azerbaijan	2	0	2	106	201	2

6 August 2008
Finland	118–56	Azerbaijan	Târgu Mureș
8 August 2008
Azerbaijan	50–83	Switzerland	Târgu Mureș
9 August 2008
Switzerland	82–80	Finland	Târgu Mureș

== Knockout stage ==
=== 13th–16th playoffs ===
13–16th place Semifinals
August 9, Târgu Mureș
Poland	79
Great Britain	58
August 9, Târgu Mureș
Ireland	65
Slovakia	95

13th place final
August 10, Târgu Mureș
Poland	82
Slovakia	58
15th place final
August 10, Târgu Mureș
Great Britain	88
Ireland	55

=== 9th–12th playoffs ===
9–12th place Semifinals
August 9, Târgu Mureș
Czech Republic	71
Hungary	57
August 9, Târgu Mureș
Norway	83
Austria	95

9th place final
August 10, Târgu Mureș
Czech Republic	82
Austria	57
11th place final
August 10, Târgu Mureș
Hungary	77
Norway	96

=== 5th–8th playoffs ===
5–8th place Semifinals
August 9, Târgu Mureș
Portugal	70
Netherlands	67
August 9, Târgu Mureș
Macedonia	59
Romania	72

5th place final
August 10, Târgu Mureș
Portugal	83
Romania	86
7th place final
August 10, Târgu Mureș
Netherlands	69
Macedonia	52

=== Championship ===
Semifinals
August 9, Târgu Mureș
Estonia	65
Germany	77
August 9, Târgu Mureș
Belgium	70
Sweden	67

Final
August 10, Târgu Mureș
Germany	110
Belgium	102
3rd place final
August 10, Târgu Mureș
Estonia	71
Sweden	80

2008 FIBA Europe U-20 Championship
Division B

Germany
First title

== Final standings ==
Rank	Team
Gold medal	Germany
Silver medal	Belgium
Bronze medal	Sweden
4th	Estonia
5th	Romania
6th	Portugal
7th	Netherlands
8th	Macedonia
9th	Czech Republic
10th	Austria
11th	Norway
12th	Hungary
13th	Poland
14th	Slovakia
15th	Great Britain
16th	Ireland
17th	Switzerland
18th	Finland
19th	Azerbaijan

== Stats leaders ==
=== Points ===
Rank	Name	Points	Games	PPG
1.	(Norway) Terrence Oglesby	195	8	24.4
2.	(Romania) Titus Nicoara	159	7	22.7
2.	(Estonia) Tanel Kurbas	152	7	21.7
4.	(Finland) Antti Kanervo	128	6	21.3
5.	(Belgium) Hockins Munda Mawejanangila	156	8	19.5

=== Rebounds ===
Rank	Name	Points	Games	RPG
1.	(Romania) Titus Nicoara	106	7	15.1
2.	(Netherlands) Roeland Schaftenaar	70	7	10.0
3.	(Romania) Vlad Moldoveanu	70	7	10.0
4.	(Azerbaijan) Amil Hamzayev	56	6	9.3
5.	(Sweden) Jeffery Taylor	74	8	9.3

=== Assists ===
Rank	Name	Points	Games	RPG
1.	(North Macedonia) Aleksandar Kostoski	32	5	6.4
2.	(Estonia) Sten-Timmu Sokk	37	6	6.2
3.	(Czech Republic) Tomás Macela	37	8	4.6
4.	(Sweden) Christian Koutras	36	8	4.5
5.	(Poland) Dardan Berisha	22	6	3.7
