= 2006 FIBA Europe Under-20 Championship Division B =

FIBA 2006 championship

2nd Division B Championship

Tournament details
- Host country: Portugal
- Dates: July 14–23
- Teams: 16 (from 48 federations)
- Venue: 1 (in 1 host city)

Final positions
- Champions: Georgia (1st title)

Tournament statistics
- Top scorer: (Switzerland) Mlađan (32.3)
- Top rebounds: (North Macedonia) Samardžiski (14.4)
- Top assists: (Portugal) Pires (6.1)
- PPG (Team): Georgia (87.8)
- RPG (Team): Sweden (38.4)
- APG (Team): Portugal (16.4)

Official website
- www.fibaeurope.com

The 2006 FIBA Europe Under-20 Championship Division B was the second edition of the Division B of the FIBA Europe Under-20 Championship, the second-tier level of European Under-20 basketball. The city of Lisbon, in Portugal, hosted the tournament. Georgia won their first title.

Georgia and Macedonia were promoted to Division A.

== Teams ==
- Austria
- Belgium
- Czech Republic
- Finland
- Georgia
- Great Britain
- Iceland
- Ireland
- Macedonia
- Netherlands
- Poland
- Portugal
- Slovakia
- Sweden
- Switzerland
- Ukraine

== Preliminary round ==
The sixteen teams were allocated in four groups of four teams each.

Team advanced to Quarter-Final round
Team competed in Classification round

=== Group A ===
Team	Pld	W	L	PF	PA	Pts
Poland	3	3	0	243	220	6
Belgium	3	2	1	222	171	5
Ireland	3	1	2	185	206	4
Great Britain	3	0	3	178	231	3

14 July 2006
Belgium	79–90	Poland	Lisbon
Ireland	71–70	Great Britain	Lisbon
15 July 2006
Great Britain	39–86	Belgium	Lisbon
Poland	79–72	Ireland	Lisbon
16 July 2006
Ireland	42–57	Belgium	Lisbon
Poland	74–69	Great Britain	Lisbon

=== Group B ===
Team	Pld	W	L	PF	PA	Pts
Finland	3	3	0	272	217	6
Georgia	3	2	1	276	231	5
Netherlands	3	1	2	238	249	4
Iceland	3	0	3	199	288	3

14 July 2006
Iceland	58–99	Netherlands	Lisbon
Finland	87–81	Georgia	Lisbon
15 July 2006
Georgia	89–80	Iceland	Lisbon
Netherlands	75–85	Finland	Lisbon
16 July 2006
Georgia	106–64	Netherlands	Lisbon
Iceland	61–100	Finland	Lisbon

=== Group C ===
Team	Pld	W	L	PF	PA	Pts
Czech Republic	3	2	1	235	219	5
Macedonia	3	2	1	264	246	5
Slovakia	3	1	2	211	222	4
Switzerland	3	1	2	224	247	4

14 July 2006
Switzerland	85–99	Macedonia	Lisbon
Slovakia	68–69	Czech Republic	Lisbon
15 July 2006
Czech Republic	74–77	Switzerland	Lisbon
Macedonia	91–69	Slovakia	Lisbon
16 July 2006
Switzerland	62–74	Slovakia	Lisbon
Czech Republic	92–74	Macedonia	Lisbon

=== Group D ===
Team	Pld	W	L	PF	PA	Pts
Austria	3	2	1	226	216	5
Ukraine	3	2	1	220	201	5
Sweden	3	1	2	212	222	4
Portugal	3	1	2	199	219	4

14 July 2006
Sweden	72–86	Ukraine	Lisbon
Portugal	81–80	Austria	Lisbon
15 July 2006
Austria	77–68	Sweden	Lisbon
Ukraine	67–60	Portugal	Lisbon
16 July 2006
Ukraine	67–69	Austria	Lisbon
Portugal	58–72	Sweden	Lisbon

== Quarter-final round ==
The eight top teams were allocated in two groups of four teams each.

Team advanced to Semifinals
Team competed in 5th–8th playoffs

=== Group E ===
Team	Pld	W	L	PF	PA	Pts
Poland	3	2	1	221	215	5
Georgia	3	2	1	256	244	5
Ukraine	3	1	2	193	190	4
Czech Republic	3	1	2	203	224	4

18 July 2006
Georgia	98–88	Czech Republic	Lisbon
Poland	67–65	Ukraine	Lisbon
19 July 2006
Czech Republic	77–69	Poland	Lisbon
Ukraine	71–85	Georgia	Lisbon
20 July 2006
Poland	85–73	Georgia	Lisbon
Czech Republic	38–57	Ukraine	Lisbon

=== Group F ===
Team	Pld	W	L	PF	PA	Pts
Finland	3	3	0	251	185	6
Macedonia	3	2	1	241	226	5
Austria	3	1	2	212	230	4
Belgium	3	0	3	176	239	3

18 July 2006
Finland	77–68	Macedonia	Lisbon
Belgium	49–73	Austria	Lisbon
19 July 2006
Macedonia	87–72	Belgium	Lisbon
Austria	62–95	Finland	Lisbon
20 July 2006
Belgium	55–79	Finland	Lisbon
Macedonia	86–77	Austria	Lisbon

== Classification round ==
The eight bottom teams were allocated in two groups of four teams each.

Team advanced to 9th–12th playoffs
Team competed in 13th–16th playoffs

=== Group G ===
Team	Pld	W	L	PF	PA	Pts
Portugal	3	3	0	248	203	6
Iceland	3	2	1	231	243	5
Ireland	3	1	2	239	258	4
Slovakia	3	0	3	210	224	3

18 July 2006
Iceland	71–68	Slovakia	Lisbon
Ireland	71–88	Portugal	Lisbon
19 July 2006
Slovakia	71–79	Ireland	Lisbon
Portugal	86–61	Iceland	Lisbon
20 July 2006
Ireland	89–99	Iceland	Lisbon
Slovakia	71–74	Portugal	Lisbon

=== Group H ===
Team	Pld	W	L	PF	PA	Pts
Netherlands	3	3	0	256	203	6
Sweden	3	2	1	258	214	5
Switzerland	3	1	2	217	239	4
Great Britain	3	0	3	200	275	3

18 July 2006
Netherlands	80–69	Switzerland	Lisbon
Great Britain	52–113	Sweden	Lisbon
19 July 2006
Switzerland	79–76	Great Britain	Lisbon
Sweden	62–93	Netherlands	Lisbon
20 July 2006
Great Britain	72–83	Netherlands	Lisbon
Switzerland	69–83	Sweden	Lisbon

== Knockout stage ==
=== 13th–16th playoffs ===
Playoffs
July 22, Lisbon
Ireland	68
Great Britain	87
July 22, Lisbon
Slovakia	94
Switzerland	83

Thirteenth place
July 23, Lisbon
Great Britain	70
Slovakia	83
Fifteenth place
July 23, Lisbon
Ireland	62
Switzerland	72

=== 9th–12th playoffs ===
Playoffs
July 22, Lisbon
Sweden	69
Portugal	84
July 22, Lisbon
Netherlands	98
Iceland	87

Ninth place
July 23, Lisbon
Portugal	66
Netherlands	79
Eleventh place
July 23, Lisbon
Sweden	101
Iceland	65

=== 5th–8th playoffs ===
Playoffs
July 22, Lisbon
Ukraine	55
Belgium	65
July 22, Lisbon
Czech Republic	95
Austria	77

Fifth place
July 23, Lisbon
Belgium	66
Czech Republic	80
Seventh place
July 23, Lisbon
Ukraine	73
Austria	68

=== Championship ===
Playoffs
July 22, Lisbon
Poland	72
Macedonia	77
July 22, Lisbon
Georgia	74
Finland	63

Final
July 23, Lisbon
Macedonia	88
Georgia	96
Third place
July 23, Lisbon
Poland	75
Finland	91

2006 FIBA Europe U-20
Championship Division B

Georgia
First title

== Final standings ==
Rank	Team
Gold medal	Georgia
Silver medal	Macedonia
Bronze medal	Finland
4th	Poland
5th	Czech Republic
6th	Belgium
7th	Ukraine
8th	Austria
9th	Netherlands
10th	Portugal
11th	Sweden
12th	Iceland
13th	Slovakia
14th	Great Britain
15th	Switzerland
16th	Ireland

== Stats leaders ==
=== Points ===
Rank	Name	Points	Games	PPG
1.	(Switzerland) Dušan Mlađan	258	8	32.3
2.	(Georgia (country)) Viktor Sanikidze	194	8	24.3
2.	(Republic of Ireland) Aaron Westbrooks	186	8	23.3
4.	(Iceland) Jóhann Olafsson	174	8	21.8
5.	(North Macedonia) Predrag Samardžiski	163	8	20.4

=== Rebounds ===
Rank	Name	Points	Games	RPG
1.	(North Macedonia) Predrag Samardžiski	115	8	14.4
2.	(Georgia (country)) Viktor Sanikidze	87	8	10.9
3.	(Switzerland) Westher Molteni	75	8	9.4
4.	(Iceland) Pavel Ermolinskij	72	8	9.0
5.	(Poland) Pawel Leonczyk	68	8	8.5

=== Assists ===
Rank	Name	Points	Games	RPG
1.	(Portugal) Antonio Pires	49	8	6.1
2.	(Georgia (country)) Giorgi Gamqrelidze	48	8	6.0
3.	(Sweden) Rudy Mbemba	41	7	5.9
4.	(North Macedonia) Aleksandar Kostoski	32	8	4.0
5.	(Slovakia) Roman Marko	31	8	3.9
