= Estonia men's national under-20 basketball team =

Estonia
- Joined FIBA: 1934; 1991
- FIBA zone: FIBA Europe
- National federation: Estonian Basketball Association
- Coach: Valdo Lips

U20 EuroBasket
- Appearances: 3
- Medals: None

U20 EuroBasket Division B
- Appearances: 11
- Medals: Silver: 1 (2011); Bronze: 1 (2022)
| Home | Away |

The Estonia men's national under-20 basketball team is a national basketball team of Estonia, administered by the Estonian Basketball Association. It represents the country in international under-20 men's basketball competitions.

Several players from the U20 program have gone on to represent Estonia at senior level, including Siim-Sander Vene, Kristjan Kitsing, and Maik-Kalev Kotsar.

== FIBA U20 EuroBasket participations ==
| Year | Division A | Division B |
|---|---|---|
| 2007 | | 6th |
| 2008 | | 4th |
| 2011 | | 2nd place, silver medalist(s) |
| 2012 | 15th | |
| 2013 | 19th | |
| 2014 | | 12th |
| 2016 | | 19th |

| Year | Division A | Division B |
|---|---|---|
| 2018 | | 14th |
| 2019 | | 10th |
| 2022 | | 3rd place, bronze medalist(s) |
| 2023 | 16th | |
| 2024 | | 11th |
| 2025 | | 19th |
| 2026 | | 17th |

== See also ==
- Estonia men's national basketball team
- Estonia men's national under-18 basketball team
- Estonia women's national under-20 basketball team
