= Malta men's national under-20 basketball team =

Malta
- FIBA zone: FIBA Europe
- National federation: Malta Basketball Association

U20 European Championship
- Appearances: None

U20 European Championship Division B
- Appearances: 1
- Medals: None

The Malta men's national under-20 basketball team is a national basketball team of Malta, administered by the Malta Basketball Association. It represents the country in men's international under-20 basketball competitions.

== FIBA U20 European Championship participations ==
Year	Result in Division B
2017	20th

== See also ==
- Malta men's national basketball team
- Malta men's national under-18 basketball team
