= Netherlands men's national under-20 basketball team =

Netherlands
- FIBA zone: FIBA Europe
- National federation: Basketball Nederland

U20 EuroBasket
- Appearances: 1
- Medals: None

U20 EuroBasket Division B
- Appearances: 18
- Medals: Gold: 1 (2009)

The Netherlands men's national under-20 basketball team is a national basketball team of the Netherlands, administered by the Basketball Nederland. It represents the country in international under-20 men's basketball competitions.

== FIBA U20 EuroBasket participations ==
Year	Division A	Division B
2006		9th
2007		14th
2008		7th
2009		1st place, gold medalist(s)
2010	15th	
2011		16th
2012		14th
2013		8th
2014		5th
2015		6th

Year	Division A	Division B
2016		15th
2017		10th
2018		15th
2019		6th
2022		13th
2023		5th
2024		4th
2025		5th
2026		12th

== See also ==
- Netherlands men's national basketball team
- Netherlands men's national under-18 basketball team
- Netherlands women's national under-20 basketball team
