= 2023 FIBA U20 European Championship Division B =

European basketball tournament in Skopje

Tournament details
- Host country: North Macedonia
- City: Skopje
- Dates: 7–16 July 2023
- Teams: 20 (from 1 confederation)
- Venue(s): 2 (in 1 host city)

Final positions
- Champions: Czech Republic
- Runners-up: North Macedonia
- Third place: Ukraine

Official website
- www.fiba.basketball

The 2023 FIBA U20 European Championship Division B was the 17th edition of the Division B of the European basketball championship for men's national under-20 teams. It was played from 7 to 16 July 2023 in Skopje, North Macedonia.

== Participating teams ==
- Albania
- Austria
- Azerbaijan
- Bulgaria
- Czech Republic ▼ (15th place, 2022 FIBA U20 European Championship Division A)
- Finland
- Georgia
- Great Britain
- Hungary
- Ireland
- Kosovo
- Latvia
- Luxembourg
- Netherlands
- North Macedonia
- Portugal ▼ (14th place, 2022 FIBA U20 European Championship Division A)
- Slovakia
- Sweden
- Switzerland
- Ukraine ▼ (16th place, 2022 FIBA U20 European Championship Division A)

== First round ==
The draw of the first round was held on 14 February 2023 in Freising, Germany.

In the first round, the teams were drawn into four groups. The first two teams from each group advanced to the quarterfinals; the third and fourth teams advanced to the 9th–16th place playoffs; the other teams played in the 17th–20th place classification group.

All times are local (Central European Summer Time – UTC+2).

=== Group A ===
Pos	Team	Pld	W	L	PF	PA	PD	Pts	Qualification
1	North Macedonia	4	3	1	316	264	+52	7	Quarterfinals
2	Czech Republic	4	3	1	326	278	+48	7	Quarterfinals
3	Bulgaria	4	3	1	347	298	+49	7	9th–16th place playoffs
4	Ireland	4	1	3	226	322	−96	5	9th–16th place playoffs
5	Slovakia	4	0	4	262	315	−53	4	17th–20th place classification

Source: FIBA

7 July 2023
13:30

Boxscore

Bulgaria	95–38	Ireland

SRC Kale

7 July 2023
18:30

Boxscore

North Macedonia	75–80	Czech Republic

SRC Kale

8 July 2023
18:30

Boxscore

Slovakia	64–81	North Macedonia

SRC Kale

8 July 2023
21:00

Boxscore

Czech Republic	102–104 (OT)	Bulgaria

Boris Trajkovski Sports Center

9 July 2023
16:00

Boxscore

Bulgaria	94–75	Slovakia

SRC Kale

9 July 2023
18:30

Boxscore

Ireland	44–82	Czech Republic

SRC Kale

11 July 2023
18:30

Boxscore

North Macedonia	83–54	Bulgaria

SRC Kale

11 July 2023
21:00

Boxscore

Slovakia	68–78 (OT)	Ireland

Boris Trajkovski Sports Center

12 July 2023
16:00

Boxscore

Czech Republic	62–55	Slovakia

Boris Trajkovski Sports Center

12 July 2023
18:30

Boxscore

Ireland	66–77	North Macedonia

SRC Kale

=== Group B ===
Pos	Team	Pld	W	L	PF	PA	PD	Pts	Qualification
1	Portugal	4	4	0	275	229	+46	8	Quarterfinals
2	Great Britain	4	2	2	245	247	−2	6	Quarterfinals
3	Austria	4	2	2	271	291	−20	6	9th–16th place playoffs
4	Hungary	4	1	3	275	264	+11	5	9th–16th place playoffs
5	Luxembourg	4	1	3	244	279	−35	5	17th–20th place classification

Source: FIBA

7 July 2023
16:00

Boxscore

Hungary	60–65	Portugal

SRC Kale

7 July 2023
21:00

Boxscore

Great Britain	72–63	Austria

SRC Kale

8 July 2023
13:30

Boxscore

Luxembourg	63–85	Hungary

Boris Trajkovski Sports Center

8 July 2023
16:00

Boxscore

Portugal	63–56	Great Britain

Boris Trajkovski Sports Center

9 July 2023
13:30

Boxscore

Great Britain	60–67	Luxembourg

Boris Trajkovski Sports Center

9 July 2023
18:30

Boxscore

Austria	62–80	Portugal

Boris Trajkovski Sports Center

11 July 2023
13:30

Boxscore

Hungary	54–57	Great Britain

SRC Kale

11 July 2023
21:00

Boxscore

Luxembourg	63–67	Austria

SRC Kale

12 July 2023
16:00

Boxscore

Portugal	67–51	Luxembourg

SRC Kale

12 July 2023
18:30

Boxscore

Austria	79–76 (2OT)	Hungary

Boris Trajkovski Sports Center

=== Group C ===
Pos	Team	Pld	W	L	PF	PA	PD	Pts	Qualification
1	Sweden	4	4	0	360	284	+76	8	Quarterfinals
2	Ukraine	4	3	1	334	257	+77	7	Quarterfinals
3	Georgia	4	2	2	294	309	−15	6	9th–16th place playoffs
4	Kosovo	4	1	3	283	313	−30	5	9th–16th place playoffs
5	Azerbaijan	4	0	4	244	352	−108	4	17th–20th place classification

Source: FIBA

7 July 2023
13:30

Boxscore

Sweden	102–50	Azerbaijan

Boris Trajkovski Sports Center

7 July 2023
18:30

Boxscore

Georgia	55–82	Ukraine

Boris Trajkovski Sports Center

8 July 2023
13:30

Boxscore

Kosovo	70–80	Georgia

SRC Kale

8 July 2023
21:00

Boxscore

Ukraine	80–83	Sweden

SRC Kale

9 July 2023
16:00

Boxscore

Sweden	84–76	Kosovo

Boris Trajkovski Sports Center

9 July 2023
21:00

Boxscore

Azerbaijan	57–94	Ukraine

Boris Trajkovski Sports Center

11 July 2023
16:00

Boxscore

Kosovo	75–71	Azerbaijan

SRC Kale

11 July 2023
18:30

Boxscore

Georgia	78–91	Sweden

Boris Trajkovski Sports Center

12 July 2023
13:30

Boxscore

Ukraine	78–62	Kosovo

Boris Trajkovski Sports Center

12 July 2023
21:00

Boxscore

Azerbaijan	66–81	Georgia

Boris Trajkovski Sports Center

=== Group D ===
Pos	Team	Pld	W	L	PF	PA	PD	Pts	Qualification
1	Netherlands	4	3	1	312	258	+54	7	Quarterfinals
2	Switzerland	4	3	1	310	305	+5	7	Quarterfinals
3	Latvia	4	2	2	331	284	+47	6	9th–16th place playoffs
4	Finland	4	2	2	318	287	+31	6	9th–16th place playoffs
5	Albania	4	0	4	247	384	−137	4	17th–20th place classification

Source: FIBA

7 July 2023
16:00

Boxscore

Finland	66–76	Switzerland

Boris Trajkovski Sports Center

7 July 2023
21:00

Boxscore

Netherlands	65–57	Latvia

Boris Trajkovski Sports Center

8 July 2023
16:00

Boxscore

Albania	65–97	Netherlands

SRC Kale

8 July 2023
18:30

Boxscore

Latvia	90–66	Finland

Boris Trajkovski Sports Center

9 July 2023
13:30

Boxscore

Finland	107–46	Albania

SRC Kale

9 July 2023
21:00

Boxscore

Switzerland	96–85 (OT)	Latvia

SRC Kale

11 July 2023
13:30

Boxscore

Netherlands	75–79	Finland

Boris Trajkovski Sports Center

11 July 2023
16:00

Boxscore

Albania	79–81 (OT)	Switzerland

Boris Trajkovski Sports Center

12 July 2023
13:30

Boxscore

Latvia	99–57	Albania

SRC Kale

12 July 2023
21:00

Boxscore

Switzerland	57–75	Netherlands

SRC Kale

== 17th–20th place classification ==
=== Group E ===
Pos	Team	Pld	W	L	PF	PA	PD	Pts
17	Luxembourg	3	3	0	250	197	+53	6
18	Slovakia	3	2	1	203	199	+4	5
19	Albania	3	1	2	199	221	−22	4
20	Azerbaijan	3	0	3	169	204	−35	3

First match(es) will be played: 14 July 2023. Source: FIBA

14 July 2023
11:00

Boxscore

Slovakia	72–70	Albania

Boris Trajkovski Sports Center

14 July 2023
11:00

Boxscore

Luxembourg	78–63	Azerbaijan

SRC Kale

15 July 2023
11:00

Boxscore

Azerbaijan	47–61	Slovakia

Boris Trajkovski Sports Center

15 July 2023
11:00

Boxscore

Albania	64–90	Luxembourg

SRC Kale

16 July 2023
9:00

Boxscore

Azerbaijan	59–65	Albania

SRC Kale

16 July 2023
11:30

Boxscore

Slovakia	70–82	Luxembourg

SRC Kale

== 9th–16th place playoffs ==
13th place match
Latvia	99
Georgia	93
15th place match
Hungary	69
Ireland	54

13th–16th place semifinals
Hungary	81
Latvia (OT)	85
Ireland	67
Georgia	92

9th–16th place quarterfinals
A3	Bulgaria	75
B4	Hungary	59
D3	Latvia	77
C4	Kosovo	81
B3	Austria	79
A4	Ireland	60
C3	Georgia	64
D4	Finland	79

9th–12th place semifinals
Bulgaria	115
Kosovo	80
Austria	72
Finland	80

9th place match
Bulgaria	70
Finland	78
11th place match
Kosovo (OT)	78
Austria	67

=== 9th–16th place quarterfinals ===
14 July 2023
13:30

Boxscore

Bulgaria	75–59	Hungary

SRC Kale

14 July 2023
13:30

Boxscore

Austria	79–60	Ireland

Boris Trajkovski Sports Center

14 July 2023
16:00

Boxscore

Latvia	77–81	Kosovo

SRC Kale

14 July 2023
16:00

Boxscore

Georgia	64–79	Finland

Boris Trajkovski Sports Center

=== 13th–16th place semifinals ===
15 July 2023
13:30

Boxscore

Hungary	81–85 (OT)	Latvia

SRC Kale

15 July 2023
16:00

Boxscore

Ireland	67–92	Georgia

SRC Kale

=== 9th–12th place semifinals ===
15 July 2023
18:30

Boxscore

Bulgaria	115–80	Kosovo

SRC Kale

15 July 2023
21:00

Boxscore

Austria	72–80	Finland

SRC Kale

=== 15th place match ===
16 July 2023
14:00

Boxscore

Hungary	69–54	Ireland

SRC Kale

=== 13th place match ===
16 July 2023
16:30

Boxscore

Latvia	99–93	Georgia

SRC Kale

=== 11th place match ===
16 July 2023
19:00

Boxscore

Kosovo	78–67 (OT)	Austria

SRC Kale

=== 9th place match ===
16 July 2023
16:00

Boxscore

Bulgaria	70–78	Finland

Boris Trajkovski Sports Center

== Championship playoffs ==
5th place match
Netherlands	77
Portugal	66
7th place match
Great Britain	74
Switzerland	82

5th–8th place semifinals
Great Britain	78
Netherlands	82
Portugal	76
Switzerland	58

Quarterfinals
A1	North Macedonia	66
B2	Great Britain	49
D1	Netherlands	49
C2	Ukraine	67
B1	Portugal	57
A2	Czech Republic	73
C1	Sweden	84
D2	Switzerland	72

Semifinals
North Macedonia	66
Ukraine	53
Czech Republic	94
Sweden	74

Final
North Macedonia	72
Czech Republic	85
3rd place match
Ukraine	83
Sweden	61

=== Quarterfinals ===
14 July 2023
18:30

Boxscore

North Macedonia	66–49	Great Britain

SRC Kale

14 July 2023
18:30

Boxscore

Portugal	57–73	Czech Republic

Boris Trajkovski Sports Center

14 July 2023
21:00

Boxscore

Netherlands	49–67	Ukraine

SRC Kale

14 July 2023
21:00

Boxscore

Sweden	84–72	Switzerland

Boris Trajkovski Sports Center

=== 5th–8th place semifinals ===
15 July 2023
13:30

Boxscore

Great Britain	78–82	Netherlands

Boris Trajkovski Sports Center

15 July 2023
16:00

Boxscore

Portugal	76–58	Switzerland

Boris Trajkovski Sports Center

=== Semifinals ===
15 July 2023
18:30

Boxscore

North Macedonia	66–53	Ukraine

Boris Trajkovski Sports Center

15 July 2023
21:00

Boxscore

Czech Republic	94–74	Sweden

Boris Trajkovski Sports Center

=== 7th place match ===
16 July 2023
11:00

Boxscore

Great Britain	74–82	Switzerland

Boris Trajkovski Sports Center

=== 5th place match ===
16 July 2023
13:30

Boxscore

Netherlands	77–66	Portugal

Boris Trajkovski Sports Center

=== 3rd place match ===
16 July 2023
18:30

Boxscore

Ukraine	83–61	Sweden

Boris Trajkovski Sports Center

=== Final ===
16 July 2023
21:00

Boxscore

North Macedonia	72–85	Czech Republic

Boris Trajkovski Sports Center

== Final standings ==
Rank	Team
1st place, gold medalist(s)	Czech Republic
2nd place, silver medalist(s)	North Macedonia
3rd place, bronze medalist(s)	Ukraine
4	Sweden
5	Netherlands
6	Portugal
7	Switzerland
8	Great Britain
9	Finland
10	Bulgaria
11	Kosovo
12	Austria
13	Latvia
14	Georgia
15	Hungary
16	Ireland
17	Luxembourg
18	Slovakia
19	Albania
20	Azerbaijan

Promoted to the 2024 FIBA U20 EuroBasket Division A
