= Great Britain men's national under-20 basketball team =

Great Britain
- FIBA zone: FIBA Europe
- National federation: British Basketball

U20 EuroBasket
- Appearances: 4
- Medals: None

U20 EuroBasket Division B
- Appearances: 13
- Medals: Silver: 1 (2013); Bronze: 1 (2017)
Home	Away

The Great Britain men's national under-20 basketball team is a national basketball team of Great Britain, administered by the British Basketball. It represents the country in international under-20 men's basketball competitions.

== FIBA U20 EuroBasket participations ==
Year	Division A	Division B
2006		14th
2007		8th
2008		15th
2009		13th
2010		6th
2011		13th
2012		6th
2013		2nd place, silver medalist(s)
2014	11th	

Year	Division A	Division B
2015	15th	
2016		7th
2017		3rd place, bronze medalist(s)
2018	10th	
2019	8th	
2023		8th
2024		12th
2025		6th

== Former players ==
- Dan Akin

== See also ==
- Great Britain men's national basketball team
- Great Britain men's national under-18 basketball team
- Great Britain women's national under-20 basketball team
