= 2025 FIBA U20 EuroBasket Division B =

International youth basketball tournament

Tournament details
- Host country: Armenia
- City: Yerevan
- Dates: 11–20 July 2025
- Teams: 21 (from 1 confederation)
- Venue: 2 (in 1 host city)

Final positions
- Champions: Latvia (1st title)
- Runners-up: Croatia
- Third place: Turkey

Tournament statistics
- Games played: 74
- Attendance: 6,163 (83 per game)
- MVP: (Latvia) Rolands Sulcs
- Top scorer: (Austria) Omer Suljanovic (21.7 points per game)

Official website
- www.fiba.basketball

The 2025 FIBA U20 EuroBasket Division B was the 19th edition of the Division B of the European basketball championship for men's under-20 national teams. The tournament was played in Yerevan, Armenia, from 11 to 20 July 2025.

== Participating teams ==
- Albania
- Armenia
- Austria
- Bulgaria
- Croatia
- Denmark
- Estonia
- Georgia
- Great Britain
- Hungary
- Ireland
- Kosovo
- Latvia
- Montenegro ▼ (16th place, 2024 FIBA U20 EuroBasket Division A)
- Netherlands
- North Macedonia ▼ (15th place, 2024 FIBA U20 EuroBasket Division A)
- Portugal
- Slovakia
- Sweden
- Switzerland
- Turkey ▼ (14th place, 2024 FIBA U20 EuroBasket Division A)

== First round ==
The draw of the first round was held on 28 January 2025 in Freising, Germany.

In the first round, the teams were drawn into four groups. The first two teams from each group will advance to the quarterfinals; the third and fourth teams will advance to the 9th–16th place playoffs; the other teams will play in the 17th–21st place classification.

All times are local (Armenia Time – UTC+4).

=== Group A ===
Pos	Team	Pld	W	L	PF	PA	PD	Pts	Qualification
1	Croatia	4	4	0	337	249	+88	8	Quarterfinals
2	Great Britain	4	2	2	253	268	−15	6	Quarterfinals
3	Portugal	4	2	2	277	280	−3	6	9th–16th place playoffs
4	Bulgaria	4	1	3	252	311	−59	5	9th–16th place playoffs
5	Slovakia	4	1	3	262	273	−11	5	17th–21st place classification

Source: FIBA

11 July 2025
13:30

Boxscore

Great Britain	75–61	Bulgaria
Scoring by quarter: 20–16, 15–20, 18–16, 22–9
Pts: Onyia 15; Rebs: Onyia 10; Asts: Campbell, Perry-Huggins 3		Pts: Korestilov 12; Rebs: three players 4 Asts: Kadiev 6

Mika Sport Complex
Attendance: 50
Referees: Kirile Tvauri (GEO), Ioannis Tsibouris (GRE), Samu Turunen (FIN)

11 July 2025
15:00

Boxscore

Portugal	63–80	Croatia
Scoring by quarter: 14–23, 11–14, 15–17, 23–26
Pts: Gomes 16; Rebs: Panzo 8 Asts: Coelho 4		Pts: Škrobot 16; Rebs: four players 6 Asts: Torbarina 7

Sport and Music Complex
Attendance: 50
Referees: Vicente Martinez Silla (ESP), Skirmantas Letukas (DEN), Gilbert Hoxha (ALB)

12 July 2025
11:00

Boxscore

Slovakia	67–78	Portugal
Scoring by quarter: 13–21, 20–23, 19–8, 15–26
Pts: Luttmerding 17; Rebs: Simonides 6 Asts: Kovacik 6		Pts: Noronha 17; Rebs: Panzo 8 Asts: Victo 4

Mika Sport Complex
Attendance: 43
Referees: Stylianos Simeonidis (GRE), Michail Papaioannou (SUI), Alexander Egil Reiertsen (NOR)

12 July 2025
13:30

Boxscore

Croatia	80–63	Great Britain
Scoring by quarter: 21–20, 11–15, 28–9, 20–19
Pts: Torbarina 12; Rebs: Torbarina 7 Asts: Sare 5		Pts: Onyia 11; Rebs: Wilkinson 6 Asts: Campbell, Maddison 3

Mika Sport Complex
Attendance: 58
Referees: Radomir Vojinovic (MNE), Emmouil Tsolakos (GRE), Nace Mohorič (SLO)

13 July 2025
11:00

Boxscore

Great Britain	48–61	Slovakia
Scoring by quarter: 17–12, 9–11, 9–18, 13–20
Pts: Onyia 10; Rebs: Onyia 12; Asts: Wilkinson 4		Pts: Kovacik 15; Rebs: Matusek 8 Asts: Kovacik 3

Mika Sport Complex
Attendance: 50
Referees: Lauri Jäämaa (FIN), Pierre Landy (FRA), Tolga Edis (TUR)

13 July 2025
15:00

Boxscore

Bulgaria	56–99	Croatia
Scoring by quarter: 19–24, 19–27, 8–24, 10–24
Pts: Kadiev 13; Rebs: Bochev 6 Asts: Kadiev 5		Pts: Zemljic 23; Rebs: Pesic 10; Asts: Zagorsak 5

Sport and Music Complex
Attendance: 54
Referees: Hendrik Laas (EST), Andrej Zlatevski (MKD), Alexander Egil Reiertsen (NOR)

15 July 2025
15:00

Boxscore

Portugal	66–67	Great Britain
Scoring by quarter: 20–17, 13–11, 11–22, 22–17
Pts: Andrade 16; Rebs: Filipe, Panzo 6 Asts: Panzo 3		Pts: Michaels 18; Rebs: Onyia 16; Asts: Campbell, Wilkinson 4

Sport and Music Complex
Attendance: 51
Referees: Polat Parlak (TUR), László Goda (HUN), Andrej Zlatevski (MKD)

15 July 2025
17:30

Boxscore

Slovakia	67–69	Bulgaria
Scoring by quarter: 15–22, 10–11, 21–20, 21–16
Pts: Kovacik 17; Rebs: Matusek 9 Asts: Kovacik 3		Pts: Kadiev 15; Rebs: Bochev 10; Asts: Dimitrov 5

Sport and Music Complex
Attendance: 60
Referees: Joaquin Garcia (ESP), Gabrielius Simonavičius (LTU), Amar Djekovic (KOS)

16 July 2025
12:30

Boxscore

Croatia	78–67	Slovakia
Scoring by quarter: 18–22, 12–10, 25–23, 23–12
Pts: Sare 16; Rebs: Zagorsak 8 Asts: Torbarina 3		Pts: Luttmerding 21; Rebs: Farkas 12; Asts: Kovacik 4

Sport and Music Complex
Attendance: 41
Referees: Ioannis Tsibouris (GRE), László Goda (HUN), Blazo Begenisic (SWE)

16 July 2025
13:30

Boxscore

Bulgaria	66–70	Portugal
Scoring by quarter: 21–18, 15–19, 15–17, 15–16
Pts: Hinkov 18; Rebs: Korestilov 6 Asts: Kadiev 7		Pts: Santos 22; Rebs: Panzo 7 Asts: Victo 7

Mika Sport Complex
Attendance: 50
Referees: Kirile Tvauri (GEO), Skirmantas Letukas (DEN), Emmouil Tsolakos (GRE)

=== Group B ===
Pos	Team	Pld	W	L	PF	PA	PD	Pts	Qualification
1	Latvia	4	4	0	365	225	+140	8	Quarterfinals
2	Ireland	4	3	1	287	273	+14	7	Quarterfinals
3	Montenegro	4	2	2	275	286	−11	6	9th–16th place playoffs
4	Armenia	4	1	3	242	313	−71	5	9th–16th place playoffs
5	Estonia	4	0	4	240	312	−72	4	17th–21st place classification

Source: FIBA

11 July 2025
16:00

Boxscore

Estonia	77–79	Montenegro
Scoring by quarter: 22–24, 16–17, 23–20, 16–18
Pts: Tamm 20; Rebs: Mae 8 Asts: Aav 5		Pts: Durovic 27; Rebs: Radunovic 11; Asts: three players 3

Mika Sport Complex
Attendance: 50
Referees: Emmouil Tsolakos (GRE), Tolga Edis (TUR), Blazo Begenisic (SWE)

11 July 2025
20:00

Boxscore

Armenia	45–97	Latvia
Scoring by quarter: 3–31, 14–18, 10–17, 18–31
Pts: Melikyan 10; Rebs: Melikyan 8 Asts: three players 2		Pts: Jīnemanis 21; Rebs: three players 6 Asts: Neilands 8

Mika Sport Complex
Attendance: 400
Referees: Alfred Jovovic (CRO), Andrej Zlatevski (MKD), Amar Djekovic (KOS)

12 July 2025
16:00

Boxscore

Ireland	72–61	Estonia
Scoring by quarter: 23–14, 14–15, 13–25, 22–7
Pts: Stynes 16; Rebs: Stynes 11; Asts: Scully 4		Pts: Kilk 17; Rebs: three players 5 Asts: Aav, Lindeberg 3

Mika Sport Complex
Attendance: 50
Referees: Zdenko Zubak (SVK), Ioannis Tsibouris (GRE), Stefan Stefanov (BUL)

12 July 2025
20:00

Boxscore

Montenegro	81–65	Armenia
Scoring by quarter: 17–18, 17–18, 25–15, 22–14
Pts: Radunovic 26; Rebs: Brajovic, Radunovic 10; Asts: Mirotic 5		Pts: Melikyan 25; Rebs: Melikyan 17; Asts: Kirakosyan 3

Sport and Music Complex
Attendance: 300
Referees: Joaquin Garcia Gonzalez (ESP), László Goda (HUN), Angel Ivanov (BUL)

13 July 2025
17:30

Boxscore

Latvia	74–68	Montenegro
Scoring by quarter: 17–22, 24–19, 15–9, 18–18
Pts: Svitins 18; Rebs: Jinemanis 11; Asts: Salnajs 5		Pts: Mirotic 12; Rebs: Perovic 10; Asts: Mirotic, Carapic 4

Sport and Music Complex
Attendance: 50
Referees: Kirile Tvauri (GEO), Nace Mohorič (SLO), Stefan Stefanov (BUL)

13 July 2025
20:00

Boxscore

Armenia	71–77	Ireland
Scoring by quarter: 16–20, 18–15, 12–27, 25–15
Pts: Kirakosyan 29; Rebs: Melikyan 12; Asts: Aghajanyan, McCall 3		Pts: Stynes 16; Rebs: Uosis 8 Asts: Scully 5

Sport and Music Complex
Attendance: 200
Referees: Polat Parlak (TUR), Josh Bowe (GBR), Skirmantas Letukas (DEN)

15 July 2025
13:30

Boxscore

Ireland	68–94	Latvia
Scoring by quarter: 27–28, 9–31, 15–18, 17–17
Pts: Igbokwe 15; Rebs: Igbokwe 6 Asts: Scully, Uosis 3		Pts: Salnajs 20; Rebs: Salnajs 7 Asts: Svitins 6

Mika Sport Complex
Attendance: 50
Referees: Emmouil Tsolakos (GRE), Lauri Jäämaa (FIN), Gilbert Hoxha (ALB)

15 July 2025
20:00

Boxscore

Estonia	58–61	Armenia
Scoring by quarter: 16–18, 14–16, 12–17, 16–10
Pts: Tamm 14; Rebs: Annus, Herter 6 Asts: Herter 6		Pts: Melikyan 17; Rebs: Melikyan 16; Asts: three players 3

Sport and Music Complex
Attendance: 200
Referees: Kirile Tvauri (GEO), Michail Papaioannou (SUI), Nace Mohorič (SLO)

16 July 2025
11:00

Boxscore

Montenegro	47–70	Ireland
Scoring by quarter: 7–18, 9–20, 14–16, 17–16
Pts: Brajovic 12; Rebs: Radunovic, Perovic 6 Asts: Radunovic, Durovic 2		Pts: Uosis 15; Rebs: Igbokwe, Stynes 6 Asts: Scully 8

Mika Sport Complex
Attendance: 50
Referees: Tolga Edis (TUR), Vicente Martinez Silla (ESP), Michail Papaioannou (SUI)

16 July 2025
16:00

Boxscore

Latvia	100–44	Estonia
Scoring by quarter: 27–8, 25–5, 21–17, 27–14
Pts: Egle 16; Rebs: Jīnemanis 6 Asts: Vitols, Egle 5		Pts: Aav 12; Rebs: Paas 4 Asts: Aav 3

Mika Sport Complex
Attendance: 50
Referees: Joaquin Garcia (ESP), Alfred Jovovic (CRO), Tiago Roxo Perdigão (POR)

=== Group C ===
Pos	Team	Pld	W	L	PF	PA	PD	Pts	Qualification
1	Switzerland	5	3	2	400	395	+5	8	Quarterfinals
2	Netherlands	5	3	2	384	350	+34	8	Quarterfinals
3	Austria	5	3	2	399	374	+25	8	9th–16th place playoffs
4	Denmark	5	3	2	421	417	+4	8	9th–16th place playoffs
5	North Macedonia	5	2	3	375	411	−36	7	17th–21st place classification
6	Georgia	5	1	4	396	428	−32	6	17th–21st place classification

Source: FIBA

11 July 2025
11:00

Boxscore

Denmark	81–86	Switzerland
Scoring by quarter: 24–17, 25–24, 16–18, 16–27
Pts: Vogel 25; Rebs: Vogel 9 Asts: Bloch 6		Pts: Soroa Schaller 22; Rebs: Biku 12; Asts: five players 3

Mika Sport Complex
Attendance: 50
Referees: Hendrik Laas (EST), Polat Parlak (TUR), Alexander Egil Reiertsen (NOR)

11 July 2025
12:30

Boxscore

North Macedonia	58–78	Netherlands
Scoring by quarter: 20–19, 14–12, 14–19, 10–28
Pts: Kjirilovski 14; Rebs: Stojkovikj 10; Asts: Kjirilovski 5		Pts: Francisco Manuel 17; Rebs: Francisco Manuel 8 Asts: Van Eyck 8

Sport and Music Complex
Attendance: 50
Referees: Zdenko Zubak (SVK), László Goda (HUN), Nace Mohorič (SLO)

11 July 2025
17:30

Boxscore

Georgia	78–89	Austria
Scoring by quarter: 19–18, 21–31, 21–16, 17–24
Pts: Gogishvili 17; Rebs: Bakhtadze 7 Asts: Tsulaia, Alavidze 3		Pts: Suljanovic 27; Rebs: Schott 17; Asts: Zeleznik, Schuch 4

Sport and Music Complex
Attendance: 50
Referees: Stylianos Simeonidis (GRE), Gabrielius Simonavičius (LTU), Angel Ivanov (BUL)

12 July 2025
12:30

Boxscore

Switzerland	81–96	Georgia
Scoring by quarter: 17–24, 15–27, 19–21, 30–24
Pts: Soroa Schaller 22; Rebs: Soroa Schaller 11; Asts: Gysel, Vrsajkovic 3		Pts: Gogishvili 23; Rebs: Daushvili 10; Asts: Abuladze 5

Sport and Music Complex
Attendance: 50
Referees: Lauri Jäämaa (FIN), Josh Bowe (GBR), Blazo Begenisic (SWE)

12 July 2025
17:30

Boxscore

Netherlands	82–83	Denmark
Scoring by quarter: 34–26, 12–24, 19–16, 17–17
Pts: Van Eyck 19; Rebs: Slingerland 10; Asts: Van Eyck 4		Pts: Uagboe 21; Rebs: Andersen 10; Asts: Uagboe 6

Sport and Music Complex
Attendance: 50
Referees: Vicente Martinez Silla (ESP), Tolga Edis (TUR), Gilbert Hoxha (ALB)

12 July 2025
21:00

Boxscore

Austria	79–58	North Macedonia
Scoring by quarter: 12–13, 18–8, 30–21, 19–16
Pts: Suljanovic 19; Rebs: Schott 17; Asts: Schuch 6		Pts: Stojkovikj 15; Rebs: Stojkovikj 12; Asts: Mladenovski 6

Mika Sport Complex
Attendance: 50
Referees: Polat Parlak (TUR), Pierre Landy (FRA), Samu Turunen (FIN)

13 July 2025
16:00

Boxscore

North Macedonia	92–84	Georgia
Scoring by quarter: 31–22, 25–13, 15–26, 21–23
Pts: Kjirilovski 18; Rebs: Stojkovikj 12; Asts: Stojanov 9		Pts: Daushvili 17; Rebs: Daushvili, Bakhtadze 9 Asts: Gogishvili 5

Mika Sport Complex
Attendance: 50
Referees: Alfred Jovovic (CRO), Davit Kikhyan (ARM), Amar Djekovic (KOS)

13 July 2025
18:30

Boxscore

Netherlands	64–76	Switzerland
Scoring by quarter: 16–16, 11–25, 12–11, 25–24
Pts: Francisco Manuel 18; Rebs: Slingerland 8 Asts: van den Berg 6		Pts: Soroa Schaller 26; Rebs: Biku 11; Asts: Keredzin 5

Mika Sport Complex
Attendance: 50
Referees: Radomir Vojinovic (MNE), Stylianos Simeonidis (GRE), Gabrielius Simonavičius (LTU)

13 July 2025
21:00

Boxscore

Denmark	83–90	Austria
Scoring by quarter: 20–25, 21–19, 23–14, 19–32
Pts: Uagboe 30; Rebs: Andersen 7 Asts: Andersen 6		Pts: Zeleznik, Schuch 17; Rebs: Suljanovic 12; Asts: Schott 7

Mika Sport Complex
Attendance: 50
Referees: Zdenko Zubak (SVK), László Goda (HUN), Blazo Begenisic (SWE)

15 July 2025
12:30

Boxscore

Switzerland	81–82	North Macedonia
Scoring by quarter: 19–28, 26–18, 27–18, 9–18
Pts: Soroa Schaller 22; Rebs: Roman 11; Asts: Keredzin, Roman 6		Pts: Kechovski, Stojkovikj 16; Rebs: Lukanoski 6 Asts: Stojanov 6

Sport and Music Complex
Attendance: 50
Referees: Vicente Martinez Silla (ESP), Tolga Edis (TUR), Stefan Stefanov (BUL)

15 July 2025
16:00

Boxscore

Austria	69–79	Netherlands
Scoring by quarter: 10–24, 17–20, 24–17, 18–18
Pts: Suljanovic 23; Rebs: Schott 8 Asts: four players 2		Pts: van Eyck, van den Berg 16; Rebs: Rijkers 6 Asts: van Eyck 4

Mika Sport Complex
Attendance: 50
Referees: Hendrik Laas (EST), Josh Bowe (GBR), Davit Kikhyan (ARM)

15 July 2025
18:30

Boxscore

Georgia	74–85	Denmark
Scoring by quarter: 24–25, 19–25, 21–22, 10–13
Pts: Lomtadze 23; Rebs: Beltadze 8 Asts: Tsulaia 4		Pts: Uagboe 21; Rebs: Polonowski 10; Asts: Uagboe 5

Mika Sport Complex
Attendance: 55
Referees: Radomir Vojinovic (MNE), Pierre Landy (FRA), Tiago Roxo Perdigão (POR)

16 July 2025
17:30

Boxscore

Austria	72–76	Switzerland
Scoring by quarter: 13–19, 25–16, 14–15, 20–26
Pts: Suljanovic 24; Rebs: Schott 17; Asts: Schuch 11		Pts: Gysel 23; Rebs: Soroa Schaller 6 Asts: Roman 5

Sport and Music Complex
Attendance: 50
Referees: Radomir Vojinovic (MNE), Gilbert Hoxha (ALB), Amar Djekovic (KOS)

16 July 2025
18:30

Boxscore

Denmark	89–85	North Macedonia
Scoring by quarter: 26–25, 18–19, 22–19, 23–22
Pts: Bloch 21; Rebs: Christiansen 7 Asts: Andersen 10		Pts: Lukanoski 21; Rebs: Ivanov 10; Asts: Mladenovski 5

Mika Sport Complex
Attendance: 51
Referees: Gabrielius Simonavičius (LTU), Lauri Jäämaa (FIN), Angel Ivanov (BUL)

16 July 2025
21:00

Boxscore

Netherlands	81–64	Georgia
Scoring by quarter: 24–8, 28–13, 12–20, 17–23
Pts: Schottert 14; Rebs: van Eyck 9 Asts: van Eyck 8		Pts: Tsulaia 11; Rebs: Lomtadze 9 Asts: Alavidze 6

Mika Sport Complex
Attendance: 50
Referees: Polat Parlak (TUR), Samu Turunen (FIN), Alexander Egil Reiertsen (NOR)

=== Group D ===
Pos	Team	Pld	W	L	PF	PA	PD	Pts	Qualification
1	Turkey	4	4	0	352	218	+134	8	Quarterfinals
2	Kosovo	4	3	1	271	282	−11	7	Quarterfinals
3	Hungary	4	2	2	313	300	+13	6	9th–16th place playoffs
4	Sweden	4	1	3	291	271	+20	5	9th–16th place playoffs
5	Albania	4	0	4	198	354	−156	4	17th–21st place classification

Source: FIBA

11 July 2025
18:30

Boxscore

Sweden	59–78	Turkey
Scoring by quarter: 12–25, 13–9, 21–22, 13–22
Pts: Martenson 12; Rebs: Fontin 5 Asts: Nzonyansi 4		Pts: Tunca 19; Rebs: Altuntas 12; Asts: Cengiz 7

Mika Sport Complex
Attendance: 50
Referees: Radomir Vojinovic (MNE), Michail Papaioannou (SUI), Pierre Landy (FRA)

11 July 2025
21:00

Boxscore

Albania	53–91	Hungary
Scoring by quarter: 14–24, 11–18, 19–27, 9–22
Pts: Paloka 12; Rebs: Luka 8 Asts: Bylyku 3		Pts: Szőke 16; Rebs: M. Toth 9 Asts: Varga 6

Mika Sport Complex
Attendance: 50
Referees: Josh Bowe (GBR), Tiago Roxo Perdigão (POR), Davit Kikhyan (ARM)

12 July 2025
15:00

Boxscore

Turkey	91–43	Albania
Scoring by quarter: 24–9, 21–12, 23–11, 23–11
Pts: Akin 20; Rebs: Sivas, Atakan Bicer 8 Asts: Sivas 6		Pts: Hida 17; Rebs: Hida 12; Asts: Merdhoci 2

Sport and Music Complex
Attendance: 50
Referees: Alfred Jovovic (CRO), Kirile Tvauri (GEO), Skirmantas Letukas (DEN)

12 July 2025
18:30

Boxscore

Kosovo	71–64	Sweden
Scoring by quarter: 12–17, 24–15, 16–19, 19–13
Pts: Shatri 20; Rebs: Shatri 8 Asts: Ismajli 5		Pts: Holmstrom Riddervold 14; Rebs: Martenson 9 Asts: Holmstrom Riddervold 6

Mika Sport Complex
Attendance: 50
Referees: Hendrik Laas (EST), Gabrielius Simonavičius (LTU), Andrej Zlatevski (MKD)

13 July 2025
12:30

Boxscore

Hungary	72–95	Turkey
Scoring by quarter: 14–25, 20–24, 21–30, 17–16
Pts: Kaye, Laluska 13; Rebs: Buglyo, Hogye 5 Asts: three players 3		Pts: Tunca 21; Rebs: Tarla 9 Asts: Tunca 5

Sport and Music Complex
Attendance: 50
Referees: Joaquin Garcia (ESP), Vicente Martinez Silla (ESP), Angel Ivanov (BUL)

13 July 2025
13:30

Boxscore

Albania	57–78	Kosovo
Scoring by quarter: 13–11, 21–21, 9–21, 14–25
Pts: Cahani 15; Rebs: Hida 12; Asts: Paloka 6		Pts: Rrahmani 23; Rebs: Rrahmani 8 Asts: Ismajli 5

Mika Sport Complex
Attendance: 50
Referees: Ioannis Tsibouris (GRE), Michail Papaioannou (SUI), Emmouil Tsolakos (GRE)

15 July 2025
11:00

Boxscore

Sweden	94–45	Albania
Scoring by quarter: 28–17, 19–3, 22–13, 25–12
Pts: Tekeste 20; Rebs: Martenson 10; Asts: Hjalmarsson 10		Pts: Cahani 17; Rebs: Hida 11; Asts: Cokaj 4

Mika Sport Complex
Attendance: 50
Referees: Zdenko Zubak (SVK), Stylianos Simeonidis (GRE), Samu Turunen (FIN)

15 July 2025
21:00

Boxscore

Kosovo	78–73	Hungary
Scoring by quarter: 25–17, 16–21, 19–9, 18–26
Pts: Rrahmani 21; Rebs: Rrahmani 11; Asts: Ismajli 9		Pts: Szoke 19; Rebs: Szoke, Maly 8 Asts: K. Toth 3

Mika Sport Complex
Attendance: 60
Referees: Alfred Jovovic (CRO), Skirmantas Letukas (DEN), Alexander Egil Reiertsen (NOR)

16 July 2025
15:00

Boxscore

Hungary	77–74	Sweden
Scoring by quarter: 16–27, 19–14, 17–22, 25–11
Pts: Szoke 20; Rebs: Geringer, Szoke 7 Asts: Hogye 4		Pts: Amoran 15; Rebs: Martenson 11; Asts: Holmstrom Riddervold 12

Sport and Music Complex
Attendance: 50
Referees: Pierre Landy (FRA), Nace Mohorič (SLO), Andrej Zlatevski (MKD)

16 July 2025
20:00

Boxscore

Turkey	88–44	Kosovo
Scoring by quarter: 26–10, 24–0, 16–16, 22–18
Pts: Ozbek 16; Rebs: Altuntas, Ozbek 6 Asts: Sivas, Akin 5		Pts: Rrahmani 12; Rebs: Rrahmani, Dahsyla 8 Asts: Ismajli, Dahsyla 2

Sport and Music Complex
Attendance: 60
Referees: Hendrik Laas (EST), Josh Bowe (GBR), Davit Kikhyan (ARM)

== 17th–21st place classification ==
=== Group E ===
Pos	Team	Pld	W	L	PF	PA	PD	Pts	Qualification
1	North Macedonia	2	2	0	176	158	+18	4	17th place match
2	Georgia	2	1	1	182	175	+7	3	19th place match
3	Albania	2	0	2	157	182	−25	2	21st place

Source: FIBA

18 July 2025
11:00

Boxscore

Georgia	98–83	Albania
Scoring by quarter: 29–22, 27–23, 16–23, 26–15
Pts: Tsulaia 26; Rebs: Daushvili 7 Asts: Alavidze 9		Pts: Luka 25; Rebs: Luka 12; Asts: three players 3

Mika Sport Complex
Attendance: 50
Referees: Gabrielius Simonavičius (LTU), Stylianos Simeonidis (GRE), Davit Kikhyan (ARM)

19 July 2025
11:00

Boxscore

Albania	74–84	North Macedonia
Scoring by quarter: 20–16, 20–22, 18–30, 16–16
Pts: Paloka 31; Rebs: Hida 14; Asts: Hida, Merdhoci 4		Pts: Ivanov 21; Rebs: Lukanoski 7 Asts: Mladenovski 8

Mika Sport Complex
Attendance: 50
Referees: Emmouil Tsolakos (GRE), Skirmantas Letukas (DEN), Davit Kikhyan (ARM)

=== 17th–20th place playoffs ===
17th–20th place semifinal
A5 Slovakia	97
B5 Estonia	64

17th place match
Slovakia	64
North Macedonia	65
19th place match
Estonia	105
Georgia	85

==== 17th–20th place semifinal ====
18 July 2025
11:00

Boxscore

Slovakia	97–64	Estonia
Scoring by quarter: 28–16, 18–17, 25–14, 26–17
Pts: Chlupis 20; Rebs: Matusek 6 Asts: Kovacik 6		Pts: Aav 16; Rebs: Aav, Kilk 5 Asts: Aav 7

Sport and Music Complex
Attendance: 50
Referees: László Goda (HUN), Lauri Jäämaa (FIN), Amar Djekovic (KOS)

==== 19th place match ====
20 July 2025
09:30

Boxscore

Estonia	105–85	Georgia
Scoring by quarter: 31–22, 19–23, 27–14, 28–26
Pts: Aav 23; Rebs: Suvi 9 Asts: Aav 5		Pts: Narimanidze 32; Rebs: Narimanidze 10; Asts: Alavidze 6

Mika Sport Complex
Attendance: 50
Referees: Josh Bowe (GBR), Alexander Egil Reiertsen (NOR), Angel Ivanov (BUL)

==== 17th place match ====
20 July 2025
11:00

Boxscore

Slovakia	64–65	North Macedonia
Scoring by quarter: 17–17, 8–18, 24–13, 15–17
Pts: Chlupis 15; Rebs: Farkas 8 Asts: Luttmerding 4		Pts: Lukanoski 19; Rebs: Lukanoski 19; Asts: Kjirilovski, Ivanov 3

Sport and Music Complex
Attendance: 35
Referees: Samu Turunen (FIN), Stefan Stefanov (BUL), Davit Kikhyan (ARM)

== 9th–16th place playoffs ==
13th place match
Denmark	62
Bulgaria	74
15th place match
Armenia	80
Austria (OT)	82

13th–16th place semifinals
Armenia	92
Denmark	93
Bulgaria (OT)	77
Austria	69

9th–16th place quarterfinals
A3	Portugal	76
B4	Armenia	65
D3	Hungary	90
C4	Denmark	74
B3	Montenegro (OT)	78
A4	Bulgaria	76
C3	Austria	71
D4	Sweden	90

9th–12th place semifinals
Portugal	96
Hungary	81
Montenegro	67
Sweden	90

9th place match
Portugal	79
Sweden	87
11th place match
Hungary	81
Montenegro	73

=== 9th–16th place quarterfinals ===
18 July 2025
13:30

Boxscore

Montenegro	78–76 (OT)	Bulgaria
Scoring by quarter: 19–20, 18–16, 19–16, 14–18, Overtime: 8–6
Pts: Mirotic, Radunovic 17; Rebs: Brajovic 10; Asts: Radunovic 6		Pts: Kadiev 20; Rebs: Kolev 9 Asts: Kadiev 8

Mika Sport Complex
Attendance: 50
Referees: Josh Bowe (GBR), Zdenko Zubak (SVK), Alexander Egil Reiertsen (NOR)

18 July 2025
16:00

Boxscore

Hungary	90–74	Denmark
Scoring by quarter: 30–16, 20–22, 21–23, 19–13
Pts: Kaye 18; Rebs: Kaye 9 Asts: K. Toth 12		Pts: Dada 15; Rebs: Christiansen 7 Asts: Andersen 4

Mika Sport Complex
Attendance: 50
Referees: Joaquin Garcia (ESP), Ioannis Tsibouris (GRE), Angel Ivanov (BUL)

18 July 2025
18:30

Boxscore

Portugal	76–65	Armenia
Scoring by quarter: 23–18, 17–18, 11–17, 25–12
Pts: Santos 25; Rebs: Santos, Panzo 9 Asts: Andrade 4		Pts: Melikyan 16; Rebs: Melikyan 13; Asts: Mkrtumyan, Kirakosyan 3

Mika Sport Complex
Attendance: 500
Referees: Emmouil Tsolakos (GRE), Gilbert Hoxha (ALB), Blazo Begenisic (SWE)

18 July 2025
21:00

Boxscore

Austria	71–90	Sweden
Scoring by quarter: 26–16, 12–23, 10–28, 23–23
Pts: Suljanovic 17; Rebs: Muchitsch 10; Asts: Schuch 7		Pts: Martenson 17; Rebs: Fontin 7 Asts: Holmstrom Riddervold 9

Mika Sport Complex
Attendance: 70
Referees: Alfred Jovovic (CRO), Samu Turunen (FIN), Andrej Zlatevski (MKD)

=== 13th–16th place semifinals ===
19 July 2025
13:30

Boxscore

Armenia	92–93	Denmark
Scoring by quarter: 26–25, 14–22, 22–20, 30–26
Pts: Melikyan 23; Rebs: Melikyan 17; Asts: Kirakosyan 7		Pts: Polonowski 23; Rebs: Christiansen 5 Asts: Andersen 7

Mika Sport Complex
Attendance: 200
Referees: Pierre Landy (FRA), Michail Papaioannou (SUI), Amar Djekovic (KOS)

19 July 2025
16:00

Boxscore

Bulgaria	77–69 (OT)	Austria
Scoring by quarter: 14–19, 13–7, 18–23, 18–14, Overtime: 14–6
Pts: Dimitrov 19; Rebs: Kadiev, Dimitrov 7 Asts: Kadiev 10		Pts: Suljanovic 27; Rebs: Muchitsch, Schuch 11; Asts: Schuch 8

Mika Sport Complex
Attendance: 75
Referees: Kirile Tvauri (GEO), László Goda (HUN), Tiago Roxo Perdigão (POR)

=== 15th place match ===
20 July 2025
12:00

Boxscore

Armenia	80–82 (OT)	Austria
Scoring by quarter: 25–21, 13–20, 20–14, 14–17, Overtime: 8–10
Pts: Kirakosyan, Melikyan 21; Rebs: Melikyan 13; Asts: Kirakosyan 4		Pts: Schuch 25; Rebs: Schuch 10; Asts: Schuch 5

Mika Sport Complex
Attendance: 200
Referees: Emmouil Tsolakos (GRE), Stylianos Simeonidis (GRE), Blazo Begenisic (SWE)

=== 13th place match ===
20 July 2025
14:30

Boxscore

Denmark	62–74	Bulgaria
Scoring by quarter: 20–15, 10–21, 13–22, 19–16
Pts: Vogel 15; Rebs: Christiansen 13; Asts: Andersen 4		Pts: Kolev 19; Rebs: Kadiev 10; Asts: Kadiev 12

Mika Sport Complex
Attendance: 50
Referees: Ioannis Tsibouris (GRE), László Goda (HUN), Andrej Zlatevski (MKD)

=== 9th–12th place semifinals ===
19 July 2025
18:30

Boxscore

Portugal	96–81	Hungary
Scoring by quarter: 26–20, 25–11, 23–21, 22–29
Pts: Santos 30; Rebs: Panzo 5 Asts: Andrade 6		Pts: Szoke, Maly 14; Rebs: Kaye 6 Asts: K. Toth 10

Mika Sport Complex
Attendance: 55
Referees: Tolga Edis (TUR), Stylianos Simeonidis (GRE), Stefan Stefanov (BUL)

19 July 2025
21:00

Boxscore

Montenegro	67–90	Sweden
Scoring by quarter: 11–20, 18–20, 21–24, 17–26
Pts: Durovic 17; Rebs: Brajovic 14; Asts: Durovic 3		Pts: Holmstrom Riddervold 38; Rebs: Martenson 10; Asts: Stefanovic 5

Mika Sport Complex
Attendance: 50
Referees: Polat Parlak (TUR), Nace Mohorič (SLO), Angel Ivanov (BUL)

=== 11th place match ===
20 July 2025
17:00

Boxscore

Hungary	81–73	Montenegro
Scoring by quarter: 21–16, 17–19, 19–17, 24–21
Pts: Maly 18; Rebs: Maly, Hogye 7 Asts: K. Toth 9		Pts: Radunovic 17; Rebs: Perovic 9 Asts: Mirotic 3

Mika Sport Complex
Attendance: 50
Referees: Gabrielius Simonavičius (LTU), Gilbert Hoxha (ALB), Tiago Roxo Perdigão (POR)

=== 9th place match ===
20 July 2025
19:30

Boxscore

Portugal	79–87	Sweden
Scoring by quarter: 16–24, 34–20, 17–19, 12–24
Pts: Pinheiro 15; Rebs: Panzo 7 Asts: Coelho, Filipe 5		Pts: Holmstrom Riddervold 19; Rebs: Martenson 9 Asts: Holmstrom Riddervold 8

Mika Sport Complex
Attendance: 50
Referees: Zdenko Zubak (SVK), Lauri Jäämaa (FIN), Amar Djekovic (KOS)

== Championship playoffs ==
5th place match
Netherlands	71
Great Britain	50
7th place match
Ireland	74
Kosovo	47

5th–8th place semifinals
Ireland	64
Netherlands	68
Great Britain	71
Kosovo	61

Quarterfinals
A1	Croatia	90
B2	Ireland	69
D1	Turkey	81
C2	Netherlands	61
B1	Latvia	70
A2	Great Britain	61
C1	Switzerland	72
D2	Kosovo	61

Semifinals
Croatia	109
Turkey	86
Latvia	75
Switzerland	55

Final
Croatia	64
Latvia	74
3rd place match
Turkey	86
Switzerland	54

=== Quarterfinals ===
18 July 2025
13:30

Boxscore

Croatia	90–69	Ireland
Scoring by quarter: 29–20, 29–18, 16–12, 16–19
Pts: Subašic 17; Rebs: Skrobot 6 Asts: Sare 7		Pts: Calo 17; Rebs: Uosis 6 Asts: Uosis 4

Sport and Music Complex
Attendance: 50
Referees: Pierre Landy (FRA), Nace Mohorič (SLO), Skirmantas Letukas (DEN)

18 July 2025
16:00

Boxscore

Latvia	70–61	Great Britain
Scoring by quarter: 21–22, 17–18, 22–12, 10–9
Pts: Egle 26; Rebs: Jīnemanis, Nkoy-Eale 7 Asts: three players 2		Pts: Michaels 14; Rebs: Onyia 9 Asts: Wilkinson 3

Sport and Music Complex
Attendance: 50
Referees: Tolga Edis (TUR), Kirile Tvauri (GEO), Tiago Roxo Perdigão (POR)

18 July 2025
18:30

Boxscore

Turkey	81–61	Netherlands
Scoring by quarter: 24–15, 15–21, 27–9, 15–16
Pts: Tunca 20; Rebs: Sivas 9 Asts: Tunca 11		Pts: van Eyck 15; Rebs: Rijkers 8 Asts: van Eyck 6

Sport and Music Complex
Attendance: 50
Referees: Radomir Vojinovic (MNE), Hendrik Laas (EST), Michail Papaioannou (SUI)

18 July 2025
21:00

Boxscore

Switzerland	72–61	Kosovo
Scoring by quarter: 20–15, 20–23, 14–11, 18–12
Pts: Biku 24; Rebs: Biku 11; Asts: Roman 8		Pts: Konjuhi, Dahsyla 13; Rebs: Rrahmani 9 Asts: Ismajli 3

Sport and Music Complex
Attendance: 50
Referees: Vicente Martinez Silla (ESP), Polat Parlak (TUR), Stefan Stefanov (BUL)

=== 5th–8th place semifinals ===
19 July 2025
12:30

Boxscore

Ireland	64–68	Netherlands
Scoring by quarter: 13–19, 19–9, 14–16, 18–24
Pts: Calo 15; Rebs: Igbokwe 9 Asts: Calo 5		Pts: Ryan van Eyck 12; Rebs: three players 6 Asts: van Eyck 10

Sport and Music Complex
Attendance: 50
Referees: Zdenko Zubak (SVK), Samu Turunen (FIN), Gilbert Hoxha (ALB)

19 July 2025
15:00

Boxscore

Great Britain	71–61	Kosovo
Scoring by quarter: 22–7, 19–15, 19–20, 11–19
Pts: Onyia 18; Rebs: Perry-Huggins 11; Asts: Perry-Huggins 4		Pts: Ismajli 21; Rebs: three players 4 Asts: Dahsyla 3

Sport and Music Complex
Attendance: 50
Referees: Lauri Jäämaa (FIN), Blazo Begenisic (SWE), Joaquin Garcia (ESP)

=== 7th place match ===
20 July 2025
13:30

Boxscore

Ireland	74–47	Kosovo
Scoring by quarter: 24–5, 25–14, 17–12, 8–16
Pts: Kehoe 21; Rebs: Ezeonu, Uosis 8 Asts: Scully 7		Pts: Dahsyla 11; Rebs: Kastrati 7 Asts: Ismajli 4

Sport and Music Complex
Attendance: 70
Referees: Radomir Vojinovic (MNE), Michail Papaioannou (SUI), Skirmantas Letukas (DEN)

=== 5th place match ===
20 July 2025
16:00

Boxscore

Netherlands	71–50	Great Britain
Scoring by quarter: 21–12, 11–11, 20–7, 19–20
Pts: van Eyck 22; Rebs: van Eyck 6 Asts: van Eyck 8		Pts: Michaels 9 Rebs: Michaels, Onyia 7 Asts: Michaels, Cholevinskas 2

Sport and Music Complex
Attendance: 55
Referees: Alfred Jovovic (CRO), Polat Parlak (TUR), Nace Mohorič (SLO)

=== Semifinals ===
19 July 2025
17:30

Boxscore

Croatia	109–86	Turkey
Scoring by quarter: 20–31, 33–15, 33–24, 23–16
Pts: Mirceta 20; Rebs: Subašic 8 Asts: Sare 6		Pts: Tunca 24; Rebs: Altuntas 8 Asts: Tunca 5

Sport and Music Complex
Attendance: 140
Referees: Vicente Martinez Silla (ESP), Gabrielius Simonavičius (LTU), Josh Bowe (GBR)

19 July 2025
20:00

Boxscore

Latvia	75–55	Switzerland
Scoring by quarter: 16–15, 30–7, 14–15, 15–18
Pts: Sulcs 20; Rebs: Jīnemanis 17; Asts: Vitols 6		Pts: Donnelly 12; Rebs: Roman, Biku 6 Asts: Roman 4

Sport and Music Complex
Attendance: 120
Referees: Radomir Vojinovic (MNE), Hendrik Laas (EST), Ioannis Tsibouris (GRE)

=== 3rd place match ===
20 July 2025
18:30

Boxscore

Turkey	86–54	Switzerland
Scoring by quarter: 29–12, 13–15, 22–18, 22–9
Pts: Bicer 16; Rebs: Akin 9 Asts: Cengiz 8		Pts: Keredzin 15; Rebs: Roman 12; Asts: Keredzin, Roman 3

Sport and Music Complex
Attendance: 60
Referees: Joaquin Garcia (ESP), Hendrik Laas (EST), Pierre Landy (FRA)

=== Final ===
20 July 2025
21:00

Boxscore

Croatia	64–74	Latvia
Scoring by quarter: 10–26, 19–10, 20–13, 15–25
Pts: Zemljic 20; Rebs: Sare 9 Asts: Torbarina 4		Pts: Sulcs 18; Rebs: Jīnemanis 11; Asts: Vitols 6

Sport and Music Complex
Attendance: 600
Referees: Tolga Edis (TUR), Vicente Martinez Silla (ESP), Kirile Tvauri (GEO)

== Final standings ==
Rank	Team	Record
1st place, gold medalist(s)	Latvia	7–0
2nd place, silver medalist(s)	Croatia	6–1
3rd place, bronze medalist(s)	Turkey	6–1
4	Switzerland	4–4
5	Netherlands	5–3
6	Great Britain	3–4
7	Ireland	4–3
8	Kosovo	3–4
9	Sweden	4–3
10	Portugal	4–3
11	Hungary	4–3
12	Montenegro	3–4
13	Bulgaria	3–4
14	Denmark	4–4
15	Austria	4–4
16	Armenia	1–6
17	North Macedonia	4–3
18	Slovakia	2–4
19	Estonia	1–5
20	Georgia	2–5
21	Albania	0–6

Promoted to the 2026 FIBA U20 EuroBasket Division A
