= Bulgaria men's national under-20 basketball team =

Bulgaria
- FIBA zone: FIBA Europe
- National federation: Bulgarian Basketball Federation

U20 EuroBasket
- Appearances: 6
- Medals: None

U20 EuroBasket Division B
- Appearances: 13
- Medals: Gold: 1 (2005)

The Bulgaria men's national under-20 basketball team is a national basketball team of Bulgaria, administered by the Bulgarian Basketball Federation. It represents the country in international under-20 men's basketball competitions.

== FIBA U20 EuroBasket participations ==
Year	Division A	Division B
2005		1st place, gold medalist(s)
2006	9th	
2007	8th	
2008	15th	
2009		9th
2010		4th
2011		8th
2012		4th
2013	14th	
2014	15th	

Year	Division A	Division B
2015	20th	
2016		18th
2018		7th
2019		5th
2022		7th
2023		10th
2024		9th
2025		13th
2026		7th

== See also ==
- Bulgaria men's national basketball team
- Bulgaria men's national under-18 basketball team
- Bulgaria women's national under-20 basketball team
