= 2019 FIBA U20 European Championship Division B =

Tournament details
- Host country: Portugal
- City: Matosinhos
- Dates: 12–21 July
- Teams: 21

Final positions
- Champions: Portugal
- Runners-up: Czech Republic
- Third place: Belgium
- Fourth place: Russia

Tournament statistics
- Games played: 74
- MVP: (Portugal) Rafael Lisboa
- Top scorer: (Bulgaria) Tsvetomir Chernokojev (21.1 ppg)

Official website
- www.fiba.basketball

The 2019 FIBA U20 European Championship Division B was the 15th edition of the Division B of the FIBA U20 European Championship, the second-tier level of the European Under-20 basketball championship. The tournament was played in Matosinhos, Portugal, from 12 to 21 July 2019.

== Participating teams ==
- Albania
- Armenia
- Belarus
- Belgium
- Bulgaria
- Czech Republic
- Estonia
- Finland
- Georgia
- Hungary
- Iceland ▼ (15th place, 2018 FIBA U20 European Championship Division A)
- Ireland
- Kosovo
- Luxembourg
- Netherlands
- North Macedonia
- Portugal
- Romania ▼ (16th place, 2018 FIBA U20 European Championship Division A)
- Russia
- Slovakia
- Sweden ▼ (14th place, 2018 FIBA U20 European Championship Division A)

== Group phase ==
In the Group phase, the 21 participating teams are divided into three groups of five and one group of six. Teams play four or five games within their group.

=== Group A ===
Pos	Team	Pld	W	L	PF	PA	PD	Pts	Qualification	(Russia)	(Iceland)	(Belarus)	(Hungary)	(Republic of Ireland)
1	Russia	4	4	0	387	242	+145	8	Quarterfinals	—	90–69	83–70	90–55	124–48
2	Iceland	4	2	2	306	271	+35	6 (Note: Iceland 1–1, +32 PD; Belarus 1–1, –7 PD; Hungary 1–1, –25 PD)	Quarterfinals	69–90	—	74–79	78–41	85–61
3	Belarus	4	2	2	281	279	+2	6	9−16th classification	70–83	79–74	—	51–63	81–59
4	Hungary	4	2	2	221	268	−47	6	9−16th classification	55–90	41–78	63–51	—	62–49
5	Ireland	4	0	4	217	352	−135	4	17th−21st classification	48–124	61–85	59–81	49–62	—

Source: FIBA
Rules for classification: 1) Points; 2) Head-to-head results; 3) Points difference; 4) Points scored.

=== Group B ===
Pos	Team	Pld	W	L	PF	PA	PD	Pts	Qualification	(Czech Republic)	(Bulgaria)	(Finland)	(Albania)	(Romania)
1	Czech Republic	4	4	0	397	311	+86	8	Quarterfinals	—	93–89	105–79	111–76	88–67
2	Bulgaria	4	3	1	322	271	+51	7	Quarterfinals	89–93	—	84–58	82–62	67–58
3	Finland	4	2	2	297	306	−9	6	9−16th classification	79–105	58–84	—	87–48	73–69
4	Albania	4	1	3	259	348	−89	5	9−16th classification	76–111	62–82	48–87	—	73–68
5	Romania	4	0	4	262	301	−39	4	17th−21st classification	67–88	58–67	69–73	68–73	—

Source: FIBA
Rules for classification: 1) Points; 2) Head-to-head results; 3) Points difference; 4) Points scored.

=== Group C ===
Pos	Team	Pld	W	L	PF	PA	PD	Pts	Qualification	(Netherlands)	(Georgia (country))	(Estonia)	(Sweden)	(Kosovo)	(Armenia)
1	Netherlands	5	4	1	404	282	+122	9 (Note: Netherlands 1–1, +15 PD; Georgia 1–1, +1 PD; Estonia 1–1, –16 PD)	Quarterfinals	—	73–85	84–57	66–61	88–40	93–39
2	Georgia	5	4	1	409	313	+96	9	Quarterfinals	85–73	—	67–78	73–64	86–52	98–46
3	Estonia	5	4	1	379	285	+94	9	9−16th classification	57–84	78–67	—	59–56	86–37	99–41
4	Sweden	5	2	3	398	287	+111	7	9−16th classification	61–66	64–73	56–59	—	68–63	149–26
5	Kosovo	5	1	4	289	368	−79	6	17th−21st classification	40–88	52–86	37–86	63–68	—	97–40
6	Armenia	5	0	5	192	536	−344	5	17th−21st classification	39–93	46–98	41–99	26–149	40–97	—

Source: FIBA
Rules for classification: 1) Points; 2) Head-to-head results; 3) Points difference; 4) Points scored.

=== Group D ===
Pos	Team	Pld	W	L	PF	PA	PD	Pts	Qualification	(Portugal)	(Belgium)	(Slovakia)	(North Macedonia)	(Luxembourg)
1	Portugal (H)	4	4	0	316	197	+119	8	Quarterfinals	—	81–53	76–61	73–39	86–44
2	Belgium	4	3	1	319	264	+55	7	Quarterfinals	53–81	—	85–69	95–56	86–58
3	Slovakia	4	2	2	290	260	+30	6	9−16th classification	61–76	69–85	—	64–46	96–53
4	North Macedonia	4	1	3	234	296	−62	5	9−16th classification	39–73	56–95	46–64	—	93–64
5	Luxembourg	4	0	4	219	361	−142	4	17th−21st classification	44–86	58–86	53–96	64–93	—

Source: FIBA
Rules for classification: 1) Points; 2) Head-to-head results; 3) Points difference; 4) Points scored.
(H) Hosts

== 17th−21st place classification ==
=== Group E ===
Pos	Team	Pld	W	L	PF	PA	PD	Pts	Qualification	(Kosovo)	(Luxembourg)	(Armenia)
1	Kosovo	2	2	0	181	98	+83	4	17th place game	—	84–58	97–40
2	Luxembourg	2	1	1	178	151	+27	3	19th place game	58–84	—	120–67
3	Armenia	2	0	2	107	217	−110	2		40–97	67–120	—

Source: FIBA
Rules for classification: 1) Points; 2) Head-to-head results; 3) Points difference; 4) Points scored.

=== Group F ===
19 July 2019
16:15

Boxscore

Ireland	57–65	Romania
Scoring by quarter: 20–21, 7–18, 19–7, 11–19

Pavilhao Municipal de Custoias, Matosinhos

Romania will play for 17th place; Ireland will play for 19th place.

=== 19th place game ===
21 July 2019
13:00

Boxscore

Ireland	64–66	Luxembourg

Pavilhao Municipal de Custoias, Matosinhos

=== 17th place game ===
21 July 2019
15:15

Boxscore

Romania	66–56	Kosovo

Pavilhao Municipal de Custoias, Matosinhos

== 9th−16th place playoffs ==
13th place game
A3	Belarus	81
A4	Hungary	66
15th place game
D3	Slovakia	87
D4	North Macedonia	52

13th−16th place semifinals
A3	Belarus	70
D3	Slovakia	55
A4	Hungary	62
D4	North Macedonia	55

9th−16th place quarterfinals
A3	Belarus	75
B4	Albania	76
D3	Slovakia	71
C4	Sweden	82
B3	Finland	63
A4	Hungary	52
C3	Estonia	84
D4	North Macedonia	67

9th−12th place semifinals
B4	Albania	71
C4	Sweden	83
B3	Finland	49
C3	Estonia	84

9th place game
C4	Sweden	85
C3	Estonia	73
11th place game
B4	Albania	51
B3	Finland	80

== Championship playoffs ==
5th place game
B2	Bulgaria	92
C1	Netherlands	84
7th place game
C2	Georgia	90
A2	Iceland	94

5th–8th place semifinals
B2	Bulgaria	86
C2	Georgia	75
A2	Iceland	68
C1	Netherlands	87

Quarterfinals
A1	Russia	105
B2	Bulgaria	66
D1	Portugal	96
C2	Georgia	85
B1	Czech Republic	77
A2	Iceland	67
C1	Netherlands	70
D2	Belgium	75

Semifinal
A1	Russia	69
D1	Portugal	76
B1	Czech Republic	86
D2	Belgium	64

Final
D1	Portugal	73
B1	Czech Republic	57
3rd place game
A1	Russia	80
D2	Belgium	88

=== Final ===
21 July 2019
19:45

Boxscore

Portugal	73–57	Czech Republic

Centro de Desportos e Congressos de Matosinhos, Matosinhos
Referees: Sergii Zashchuk (UKR), Gintaras Vitkauskas (LTU), Martin Van Hoye (BEL)

== Final standings ==
Rank	Team	Record
1st place, gold medalist(s)	Portugal	7–0
2nd place, silver medalist(s)	Czech Republic	6–1
3rd place, bronze medalist(s)	Belgium	5–2
4	Russia	5–2
5	Bulgaria	5–2
6	Netherlands	5–3
7	Iceland	3–4
8	Georgia	4–4
9	Sweden	5–3
10	Estonia	6–2
11	Finland	4–3
12	Albania	2–5
13	Belarus	4–3
14	Hungary	3–4
15	Slovakia	3–4
16	North Macedonia	1–6
17	Romania	2–4
18	Kosovo	2–5
19	Luxembourg	2–5
20	Ireland	0–6
21	Armenia	0–6

Promoted to the 2022 FIBA U20 European Championship Division A

== See also ==
- 2019 FIBA U20 European Championship (Division A)
