= Denmark men's national under-20 basketball team =

Denmark men's under-20 basketball team

Denmark
- FIBA zone: FIBA Europe
- National federation: Danish Basketball Association

U20 EuroBasket
- Appearances: None

U20 EuroBasket Division B
- Appearances: 5
- Medals: None

The Denmark men's national under-20 basketball team is a national basketball team of Denmark, administered by the Danish Basketball Association. It represents the country in international under-20 men's basketball competitions.

== FIBA U20 EuroBasket participations ==
Year	Result in Division B
2010	15th
2011	7th
2012	11th
2025	14th
2026	16th

== See also ==
- Denmark men's national basketball team
- Denmark men's national under-18 basketball team
- Denmark women's national under-20 basketball team
