= 2017 FIBA U20 European Championship Division B =

Tournament details
- Host country: Romania
- City: Oradea
- Dates: 14–23 July 2017
- Teams: 21 (from 1 confederation)
- Venue(s): 2 (in 1 host city)

Final positions
- Champions: Romania (1st title)
- Runners-up: Croatia
- Third place: Great Britain

Official website
- www.fiba.basketball

The 2017 FIBA U20 European Championship Division B was the 13th edition of the Division B of the FIBA U20 European basketball championship. It was played in Oradea, Romania, from 14 to 23 July 2017. 21 teams participated in the competition. The host team, Romania, won the tournament.

== Participating teams ==
- Albania
- Armenia
- Azerbaijan
- Belarus
- Belgium ▼ (14th place, 2016 FIBA U20 European Championship Division A)
- Croatia
- Finland ▼ (15th place, 2016 FIBA U20 European Championship Division A)
- Georgia
- Great Britain
- Hungary ▼ (16th place, 2016 FIBA U20 European Championship Division A)
- Ireland
- Kosovo
- Malta
- Macedonia
- Moldova
- Netherlands
- Poland
- Portugal
- Romania
- Russia
- Slovakia

== First round ==
=== Group A ===
Pos	Team	Pld	W	L	PF	PA	PD	Pts	Team advances to
1	Poland	4	3	1	270	213	+57	7	Quarterfinals
2	Belgium	4	3	1	294	288	+6	7	Quarterfinals
3	Finland	4	2	2	333	281	+52	6	9th–16th place playoffs
4	Belarus	4	1	3	251	325	−74	5	9th–16th place playoffs
5	Armenia	4	1	3	255	296	−41	5	17th–21st place classification

Source: FIBA

=== Group B ===
Pos	Team	Pld	W	L	PF	PA	PD	Pts	Team advances to
1	Russia	4	3	1	295	236	+59	7	Quarterfinals
2	Great Britain	4	3	1	307	252	+55	7	Quarterfinals
3	Netherlands	4	3	1	281	242	+39	7	9th–16th place playoffs
4	Slovakia	4	1	3	263	305	−42	5	9th–16th place playoffs
5	Azerbaijan	4	0	4	256	367	−111	4	17th–21st place classification

Source: FIBA

=== Group C ===
Pos	Team	Pld	W	L	PF	PA	PD	Pts	Team advances to
1	Romania	4	4	0	289	226	+63	8	Quarterfinals
2	Georgia	4	3	1	321	233	+88	7	Quarterfinals
3	Macedonia	4	2	2	272	260	+12	6	9th–16th place playoffs
4	Albania	4	1	3	246	299	−53	5	9th–16th place playoffs
5	Malta	4	0	4	255	365	−110	4	17th–21st place classification

Source: FIBA

=== Group D ===
Pos	Team	Pld	W	L	PF	PA	PD	Pts	Team advances to
1	Croatia	5	5	0	498	254	+244	10	Quarterfinals
2	Portugal	5	4	1	376	303	+73	9	Quarterfinals
3	Hungary	5	3	2	353	289	+64	8	9th–16th place playoffs
4	Kosovo	5	2	3	338	372	−34	7	9th–16th place playoffs
5	Ireland	5	1	4	318	375	−57	6	17th–21st place classification
6	Moldova	5	0	5	245	535	−290	5	17th–21st place classification

Source: FIBA

== 17th–21st place classification ==
=== Group E ===
Pos	Team	Pld	W	L	PF	PA	PD	Pts	Team advances to
1	Ireland	2	2	0	194	126	+68	4	17th place match
2	Malta	2	1	1	157	139	+18	3	19th place match
3	Moldova	2	0	2	113	199	−86	2	21st place

Source: FIBA

=== Group F ===
Armenia 82–80 Azerbaijan

- Armenia will play for 17th place; Azerbaijan will play for 19th place.

=== 19th place match ===
Azerbaijan 88–63 Malta

=== 17th place match ===
Armenia 96–75 Ireland

== 9th–16th place playoffs ==
13th place match
C4	Albania	65
C3	Macedonia	71
15th place match
B4	Slovakia	61
A4	Belarus	92

13th–16th place semifinals
B4	Slovakia	62
C4	Albania	74
A4	Belarus	58
C3	Macedonia	62

9th–16th place quarterfinals
A3	Finland	93
B4	Slovakia	72
D3	Hungary	80
C4	Albania	44
B3	Netherlands	83
A4	Belarus	62
C3	Macedonia	64
D4	Kosovo	66

9th–12th place semifinals
A3	Finland	78
D3	Hungary	56
B3	Netherlands	66
D4	Kosovo	60

9th place match
A3	Finland	85
B3	Netherlands	66
11th place match
D3	Hungary	78
D4	Kosovo	53

== Championship playoffs ==
5th place match
A1	Poland	76
A2	Belgium	57
7th place match
C2	Georgia	61
D2	Portugal	53

5th–8th place semifinals
A1	Poland	91
C2	Georgia	70
A2	Belgium	87
D2	Portugal	62

Quarterfinals
A1	Poland	69
B2	Great Britain	71
D1	Croatia	74
C2	Georgia	71
B1	Russia	80
A2	Belgium	70
C1	Romania	61
D2	Portugal	57

Semifinals
B2	Great Britain	69
D1	Croatia	79
B1	Russia	79
C1	Romania	87

Final
D1	Croatia	67
C1	Romania	80
3rd place match
B2	Great Britain	81
B1	Russia	65

== Final standings ==
Rank	Team
1st place, gold medalist(s)	Romania
2nd place, silver medalist(s)	Croatia
3rd place, bronze medalist(s)	Great Britain
4	Russia
5	Poland
6	Belgium
7	Georgia
8	Portugal
9	Finland
10	Netherlands
11	Hungary
12	Kosovo
13	Macedonia
14	Albania
15	Belarus
16	Slovakia
17	Armenia
18	Ireland
19	Azerbaijan
20	Malta
21	Moldova

Promoted to the 2018 FIBA U20 European Championship Division A
