= 2009 FIBA Europe Under-20 Championship Division B =

5th Division B Championship

Tournament details
- Host country: Macedonia
- Dates: July 16–26
- Teams: 17
- Venue: 1 (in 1 host city)

Final positions
- Champions: Netherlands (1st title)

Tournament statistics
- MVP: (Austria) Rašid Mahalbašić
- Top scorer: (Austria) Mahalbašić (19.4)
- Top rebounds: (Romania) Török (11.3)
- Top assists: (Georgia (country)) Tsivtsivadze (5.5)
- PPG (Team): Czech Republic (81.9)
- RPG (Team): Slovakia (38.4)
- APG (Team): Bulgaria (15.7)

Official website
- www.fibaeurope.com

The 2009 FIBA Europe Under-20 Championship Division B was the 5th edition of the Division B of the FIBA Europe Under-20 Championship, the second-tier level of European Under-20 basketball. The city of Skopje, in the Republic of Macedonia, hosted the tournament. Netherlands won their first title.

The Netherlands and the Czech Republic were promoted to Division A.

== Teams ==
- Austria
- Bulgaria
- Czech Republic
- Finland
- Germany
- Great Britain
- Hungary
- Luxembourg
- Macedonia
- Netherlands
- Norway
- Poland
- Portugal
- Romania
- Slovakia
- Sweden
- Switzerland

== Preliminary round ==
The seventeen teams were allocated in four groups (one groups of five teams and three groups of four). The two top teams of each group advanced to the qualifying round. The last three teams of each group advanced to the classification round.

Team advanced to Qualifying round
Team competed in Classification round

=== Group A ===
Team	Pld	W	L	PF	PA	Pts
Georgia	4	3	1	310	251	7
Sweden	4	3	1	287	255	7
Portugal	4	2	2	297	288	6
Slovakia	4	1	3	301	323	5
Luxembourg	4	1	3	264	342	5

16 July 2009
Portugal	78–75	Georgia	Skopje
Sweden	91–59	Luxembourg	Skopje
17 July 2009
Slovakia	74–80	Sweden	Skopje
Luxembourg	86–67	Portugal	Skopje
18 July 2009
Georgia	88–53	Luxembourg	Skopje
Portugal	92–64	Slovakia	Skopje
19 July 2009
Sweden	63–60	Portugal	Skopje
Slovakia	67–85	Georgia	Skopje
20 July 2009
Georgia	62–53	Sweden	Skopje
Luxembourg	66–96	Slovakia	Skopje

=== Group B ===
Team	Pld	W	L	PF	PA	Pts
Poland	3	3	0	232	184	6
Finland	3	2	1	234	222	5
Norway	3	1	2	204	227	4
Great Britain	3	0	3	200	237	3

16 July 2009
Finland	65–67	Poland	Skopje
Norway	71–59	Great Britain	Skopje
18 July 2009
Poland	81–52	Norway	Skopje
Great Britain	74–82	Finland	Skopje
20 July 2009
Finland	87–81	Norway	Skopje
Great Britain	67–84	Poland	Skopje

=== Group C ===
Team	Pld	W	L	PF	PA	Pts
Netherlands	3	3	0	242	173	6
Czech Republic	3	2	1	243	196	5
Switzerland	3	1	2	182	254	4
Romania	3	0	3	190	234	3

16 July 2009
Czech Republic	79–74	Romania	Skopje
Netherlands	91–56	Switzerland	Skopje
18 July 2009
Switzerland	42–92	Czech Republic	Skopje
Romania	45–71	Netherlands	Skopje
20 July 2009
Czech Republic	72–80	Netherlands	Skopje
Switzerland	84–71	Romania	Skopje

=== Group D ===
Team	Pld	W	L	PF	PA	Pts
Macedonia	3	2	1	208	228	5
Austria	3	2	1	199	179	5
Hungary	3	1	2	195	217	4
Bulgaria	3	1	2	220	198	4

16 July 2009
Hungary	81–75	Bulgaria	Skopje
Austria	70–78	Macedonia	Skopje
18 July 2009
Bulgaria	53–55	Austria	Skopje
Macedonia	68–66	Hungary	Skopje
20 July 2009
Hungary	48–74	Austria	Skopje
Macedonia	62–92	Bulgaria	Skopje

== Qualifying round ==
The eight top teams were allocated in two groups of four teams each. Teams coming from the same initial group didn't play again vs. each other, but "carried" the results of the matches played between them for the first round.

Team advanced to Semifinals
Team competed in 5th–8th playoffs

=== Group E ===
Team	Pld	W	L	PF	PA	Pts	Tie-break
Poland	3	3	0	211	190	6	
Sweden	3	1	2	186	182	4	1–1 (+14)
Georgia	3	1	2	183	192	4	1–1 (0)
Finland	3	1	2	180	196	4	1–1 (−14)

22 July 2009
Georgia	59–68	Finland	Skopje
Sweden	63–73	Poland	Skopje
23 July 2009
Finland	47–70	Sweden	Skopje
Poland	71–62	Georgia	Skopje

=== Group F ===
Team	Pld	W	L	PF	PA	Pts
Netherlands	3	3	0	238	201	6
Czech Republic	3	2	1	246	220	5
Macedonia	3	1	2	214	252	4
Austria	3	0	3	203	228	3

22 July 2009
Czech Republic	91–69	Macedonia	Skopje
Netherlands	67–62	Austria	Skopje
23 July 2009
Austria	71–83	Czech Republic	Skopje
Macedonia	67–91	Netherlands	Skopje

== Classification round ==
The last three teams of each of the preliminary round groups were allocated in three groups of three teams each.

Team advanced to Group J
Team competed in Group K
Team competed in Group L

=== Group G ===
Team	Pld	W	L	PF	PA	Pts
Norway	2	2	0	156	128	4
Switzerland	2	1	1	150	144	3
Luxembourg	2	0	2	120	154	2

21 July 2009
Norway	78–74	Switzerland	Skopje
22 July 2009
Switzerland	76–66	Luxembourg	Skopje
23 July 2009
Luxembourg	54–78	Norway	Skopje

=== Group H ===
Team	Pld	W	L	PF	PA	Pts
Bulgaria	2	2	0	174	133	4
Great Britain	2	1	1	131	141	3
Portugal	2	0	2	120	151	2

21 July 2009
Portugal	56–62	Great Britain	Skopje
22 July 2009
Great Britain	69–85	Bulgaria	Skopje
23 July 2009
Bulgaria	89–64	Portugal	Skopje

=== Group I ===
Team	Pld	W	L	PF	PA	Pts
Slovakia	2	2	0	177	147	4
Hungary	2	1	1	175	142	3
Romania	2	0	2	115	178	2

21 July 2009
Hungary	80–94	Slovakia	Skopje
22 July 2009
Slovakia	83–67	Romania	Skopje
23 July 2009
Romania	48–95	Hungary	Skopje

== Final classification round ==
The nine teams of the classification round were allocated in another three groups of three teams, depending on their position in the previous round. Group J determined positions 9th to 11th, Group K determined positions 12th to 14th and Group L determined positions 15th to 17th (last).

=== Group J ===
Team	Pld	W	L	PF	PA	Pts
Bulgaria	2	2	0	176	169	4
Slovakia	2	1	1	169	161	3
Norway	2	0	2	149	164	2

24 July 2009
Norway	80–84	Bulgaria	Skopje
25 July 2009
Bulgaria	92–89	Slovakia	Skopje
26 July 2009
Slovakia	80–69	Norway	Skopje

=== Group K ===
Team	Pld	W	L	PF	PA	Pts
Switzerland	2	2	0	167	157	4
Great Britain	2	1	1	152	144	3
Hungary	2	0	2	150	168	2

24 July 2009
Switzerland	79–72	Great Britain	Skopje
25 July 2009
Great Britain	80–65	Hungary	Skopje
26 July 2009
Hungary	85–88	Switzerland	Skopje

=== Group L ===
Team	Pld	W	L	PF	PA	Pts
Portugal	2	2	0	172	129	4
Luxembourg	2	1	1	158	155	3
Romania	2	0	2	142	188	2

24 July 2009
Luxembourg	66–76	Portugal	Skopje
25 July 2009
Portugal	96–63	Romania	Skopje
26 July 2009
Romania	79–92	Luxembourg	Skopje

== Knockout stage ==
=== 5th–8th playoffs ===
Playoffs
July 25, Skopje
Austria	88
Georgia	80
July 25, Skopje
Finland	55
Macedonia	77

Fifth place
July 26, Skopje
Austria	87
Macedonia	67
Seventh place
July 26, Skopje
Georgia	75
Finland	97

=== Championship ===
Playoffs
July 25, Skopje
Poland	66
Czech Republic	79
July 25, Skopje
Netherlands	71
Sweden	69

Third place
July 26, Skopje
Czech Republic	77
Netherlands	88
Final
July 26, Skopje
Poland	96
Sweden	66

2009 FIBA Europe U-20
Championship Division B

Netherlands
First title

== Final standings ==
Rank	Team
Gold medal	Netherlands
Silver medal	Czech Republic
Bronze medal	Poland
4th	Sweden
5th	Austria
6th	Macedonia
7th	Finland
8th	Georgia
9th	Bulgaria
10th	Slovakia
11th	Norway
12th	Switzerland
13th	Great Britain
14th	Hungary
15th	Portugal
16th	Luxembourg
17th	Romania

== Stats leaders ==
=== Points ===
Rank	Name	Points	Games	PPG
1.	(Austria) Rašid Mahalbašić	136	7	19.4
2.	(Switzerland) Christophe Varidel	135	7	19.3
2.	(Czech Republic) David Jelinek	128	7	18.3
4.	(Slovakia) Richard Grznár	89	5	17.8
5.	(Luxembourg) Christopher Jones	141	8	17.6

=== Rebounds ===
Rank	Name	Points	Games	RPG
1.	(Romania) Rolland Török	79	7	11.3
2.	(Austria) Rašid Mahalbašić	70	7	10.0
3.	(Netherlands) Thomas Koenis	68	7	9.7
4.	(Slovakia) Peter Dorazil	69	8	8.6
5.	(Poland) Jakub Wojciechowski	51	6	8.5

=== Assists ===
Rank	Name	Points	Games	RPG
1.	(Georgia (country)) Beka Tsivtsivadze	44	8	5.5
2.	(Austria) Moritz Lanegger	32	7	4.6
3.	(United Kingdom) Nigel Van Oostrum	29	7	4.1
4.	(Poland) Tomasz Śnieg	28	7	4.0
5.	(North Macedonia) Ivica Dimčevski	26	7	3.7
