= 2011 FIBA Europe Under-20 Championship Division B =

Tournament details
- Host country: Bosnia and Herzegovina
- City: Sarajevo
- Dates: 14–24 July 2011
- Teams: 22 (from 1 confederation)
- Venue(s): 3 (in 1 host city)

Final positions
- Champions: Georgia (2nd title)
- Runners-up: Estonia
- Third place: Czech Republic

Official website
- www.fibaeurope.com

The 2011 FIBA U20 European Championship Division B was the 7th edition of the Division B of the European basketball championship for men's national under-20 teams. It was played from 14 to 24 July 2011 in Sarajevo, Bosnia and Herzegovina.

== Participating teams ==
- Belarus
- Belgium
- Bosnia and Herzegovina
- Bulgaria
- Czech Republic ▼ (16th place, 2010 FIBA Europe Under-20 Championship Division A)
- Denmark
- Estonia
- Finland
- Georgia
- Great Britain
- Hungary
- Iceland
- Israel
- Luxembourg
- Macedonia
- Netherlands ▼ (15th place, 2010 FIBA Europe Under-20 Championship Division A)
- Norway
- Poland
- Portugal
- Romania
- Slovakia
- Switzerland

== First round ==
In the first round, the teams were drawn into four groups. The first two teams from each group advance to the quarterfinal round; the third and fourth teams advance to the 9th–16th place classification; the other teams will play in the 17th–22nd place classification groups.

=== Group A ===
Pos	Team	Pld	W	L	PF	PA	PD	Pts	Qualification
1	Georgia	5	4	1	420	394	+26	9	Quarterfinal round
2	Estonia	5	3	2	424	353	+71	8	Quarterfinal round
3	Poland	5	3	2	366	360	+6	8	9th−16th place classification
4	Romania	5	3	2	311	343	−32	8	9th−16th place classification
5	Macedonia	5	2	3	359	361	−2	7	17th−22nd place classification
6	Switzerland	5	0	5	316	385	−69	5	17th−22nd place classification

Source: FIBA Archive

14 July 2011

Boxscore

Macedonia	71–74	Poland

Sarajevo

14 July 2011

Boxscore

Romania	50–85	Estonia

Sarajevo

14 July 2011

Boxscore

Switzerland	74–82	Georgia

Sarajevo

15 July 2011

Boxscore

Poland	62–70	Romania

Sarajevo

15 July 2011

Boxscore

Estonia	91–64	Switzerland

Sarajevo

15 July 2011

Boxscore

Georgia	87–75	Macedonia

Sarajevo

16 July 2011

Boxscore

Georgia	78–69	Poland

Sarajevo

16 July 2011

Boxscore

Macedonia	76–95	Estonia

Sarajevo

16 July 2011

Boxscore

Switzerland	47–53	Romania

Sarajevo

17 July 2011

Boxscore

Romania	49–64	Macedonia

Sarajevo

17 July 2011

Boxscore

Poland	86–75	Switzerland

Sarajevo

17 July 2011

Boxscore

Estonia	87–88	Georgia

Sarajevo

18 July 2011

Boxscore

Georgia	85–89	Romania

Sarajevo

18 July 2011

Boxscore

Estonia	66–75	Poland

Sarajevo

18 July 2011

Boxscore

Macedonia	73–56	Switzerland

Sarajevo

=== Group B ===
Pos	Team	Pld	W	L	PF	PA	PD	Pts	Qualification
1	Denmark	4	4	0	295	258	+37	8	Quarterfinal round
2	Bulgaria	4	3	1	283	278	+5	7	Quarterfinal round
3	Slovakia	4	2	2	279	271	+8	6	9th−16th place classification
4	Netherlands	4	1	3	278	286	−8	5	9th−16th place classification
5	Hungary	4	0	4	263	305	−42	4	17th−22nd place classification

Source: FIBA Archive

14 July 2011

Boxscore

Denmark	57–42	Hungary

Sarajevo

14 July 2011

Boxscore

Netherlands	55–57	Slovakia

Sarajevo

15 July 2011

Boxscore

Bulgaria	61–72	Denmark

Sarajevo

15 July 2011

Boxscore

Hungary	78–83	Netherlands

Sarajevo

16 July 2011

Boxscore

Slovakia	81–63	Hungary

Sarajevo

16 July 2011

Boxscore

Netherlands	68–73	Bulgaria

Sarajevo

17 July 2011

Boxscore

Denmark	78–72	Netherlands

Sarajevo

17 July 2011

Boxscore

Bulgaria	65–58	Slovakia

Sarajevo

18 July 2011

Boxscore

Hungary	80–84	Bulgaria

Sarajevo

18 July 2011

Boxscore

Slovakia	83–88	Denmark

Sarajevo

=== Group C ===
Pos	Team	Pld	W	L	PF	PA	PD	Pts	Qualification
1	Czech Republic	5	4	1	439	327	+112	9	Quarterfinal round
2	Portugal	5	4	1	325	309	+16	9	Quarterfinal round
3	Finland	5	3	2	341	330	+11	8	9th−16th place classification
4	Great Britain	5	3	2	373	326	+47	8	9th−16th place classification
5	Norway	5	1	4	335	369	−34	6	17th−22nd place classification
6	Luxembourg	5	0	5	295	447	−152	5	17th−22nd place classification

Source: FIBA Archive

14 July 2011

Boxscore

Luxembourg	60–127	Czech Republic

Sarajevo

14 July 2011

Boxscore

Portugal	60–57	Great Britain

Sarajevo

14 July 2011

Boxscore

Finland	80–55	Norway

Sarajevo

15 July 2011

Boxscore

Czech Republic	77–55	Portugal

Sarajevo

15 July 2011

Boxscore

Norway	82–49	Luxembourg

Sarajevo

15 July 2011

Boxscore

Great Britain	68–72	Finland

Sarajevo

16 July 2011

Boxscore

Norway	65–85	Czech Republic

Sarajevo

16 July 2011

Boxscore

Finland	50–57	Portugal

Sarajevo

16 July 2011

Boxscore

Luxembourg	56–85	Great Britain

Sarajevo

17 July 2011

Boxscore

Great Britain	78–64	Norway

Sarajevo

17 July 2011

Boxscore

Portugal	76–56	Luxembourg

Sarajevo

17 July 2011

Boxscore

Czech Republic	76–62	Finland

Sarajevo

18 July 2011

Boxscore

Norway	69–77	Portugal

Sarajevo

18 July 2011

Boxscore

Luxembourg	74–77	Finland

Sarajevo

18 July 2011

Boxscore

Great Britain	85–74	Czech Republic

Sarajevo

=== Group D ===
Pos	Team	Pld	W	L	PF	PA	PD	Pts	Qualification
1	Belgium	4	4	0	317	240	+77	8	Quarterfinal round
2	Bosnia and Herzegovina	4	3	1	285	285	0	7	Quarterfinal round
3	Israel	4	2	2	303	299	+4	6	9th−16th place classification
4	Iceland	4	1	3	317	324	−7	5	9th−16th place classification
5	Belarus	4	0	4	289	363	−74	4	17th−22nd place classification

Source: FIBA Archive

14 July 2011

Boxscore

Belgium	76–50	Belarus

Sarajevo

14 July 2011

Boxscore

Iceland	78–82	Bosnia and Herzegovina

Sarajevo

15 July 2011

Boxscore

Israel	78–73	Iceland

Sarajevo

15 July 2011

Boxscore

Bosnia and Herzegovina	64–83	Belgium

Sarajevo

16 July 2011

Boxscore

Belarus	67–79	Bosnia and Herzegovina

Sarajevo

16 July 2011

Boxscore

Belgium	78–57	Israel

Sarajevo

17 July 2011

Boxscore

Iceland	69–80	Belgium

Sarajevo

17 July 2011

Boxscore

Israel	111–88	Belarus

Sarajevo

18 July 2011

Boxscore

Bosnia and Herzegovina	60–57	Israel

Sarajevo

18 July 2011

Boxscore

Belarus	84–97	Iceland

Sarajevo

== Quarterfinal round ==
In this round, the teams play in two groups. The first two teams from each group advance to the semifinals; the other teams will play the 5th–8th place playoffs.

=== Group E ===
Pos	Team	Pld	W	L	PF	PA	PD	Pts	Qualification
1	Georgia	3	3	0	260	228	+32	6	Semifinals
2	Estonia	3	2	1	246	220	+26	5	Semifinals
3	Denmark	3	1	2	196	207	−11	4	5th−8th place playoffs
4	Bulgaria	3	0	3	210	257	−47	3	5th−8th place playoffs

Source: FIBA Archive

20 July 2011

Boxscore

Georgia	88–75	Bulgaria

Sarajevo

20 July 2011

Boxscore

Estonia	62–58	Denmark

Sarajevo

21 July 2011

Boxscore

Denmark	66–84	Georgia

Sarajevo

21 July 2011

Boxscore

Bulgaria	74–97	Estonia

Sarajevo

=== Group F ===
Pos	Team	Pld	W	L	PF	PA	PD	Pts	Qualification
1	Belgium	3	3	0	232	192	+40	6	Semifinals
2	Czech Republic	3	2	1	220	187	+33	5	Semifinals
3	Bosnia and Herzegovina	3	1	2	194	216	−22	4	5th−8th place playoffs
4	Portugal	3	0	3	173	224	−51	3	5th−8th place playoffs

Source: FIBA Archive

20 July 2011

Boxscore

Czech Republic	74–57	Bosnia and Herzegovina

Sarajevo

20 July 2011

Boxscore

Portugal	59–74	Belgium

Sarajevo

21 July 2011

Boxscore

Belgium	75–69	Czech Republic

Sarajevo

21 July 2011

Boxscore

Bosnia and Herzegovina	73–59	Portugal

Sarajevo

== 9th–16th place classification ==
In this round, the teams play in two groups. The first two teams from each group advance to the 9th–12th place playoffs; the other teams will play the 13th–16th place playoffs.

=== Group G ===
Pos	Team	Pld	W	L	PF	PA	PD	Pts	Qualification
1	Poland	3	2	1	235	216	+19	5	9th−12th place playoffs
2	Slovakia	3	2	1	199	209	−10	5	9th−12th place playoffs
3	Netherlands	3	1	2	225	222	+3	4	13th−16th place playoffs
4	Romania	3	1	2	216	228	−12	4	13th−16th place playoffs

Source: FIBA Archive

20 July 2011

Boxscore

Poland	88–79	Netherlands

Sarajevo

20 July 2011

Boxscore

Romania	69–75	Slovakia

Sarajevo

21 July 2011

Boxscore

Slovakia	67–85	Poland

Sarajevo

21 July 2011

Boxscore

Netherlands	91–77	Romania

Sarajevo

=== Group H ===
Pos	Team	Pld	W	L	PF	PA	PD	Pts	Qualification
1	Finland	3	2	1	223	209	+14	5	9th−12th place playoffs
2	Israel	3	2	1	225	220	+5	5	9th−12th place playoffs
3	Great Britain	3	2	1	223	224	−1	5	13th−16th place playoffs
4	Iceland	3	0	3	219	237	−18	3	13th−16th place playoffs

Source: FIBA Archive

20 July 2011

Boxscore

Finland	87–76	Iceland

Sarajevo

20 July 2011

Boxscore

Great Britain	83–82	Israel

Sarajevo

21 July 2011

Boxscore

Israel	65–64	Finland

Sarajevo

21 July 2011

Boxscore

Iceland	70–72	Great Britain

Sarajevo

== 17th–22nd place classification ==
In this round, the teams play in two groups. The first teams from each group advance to the 17th place match; the second teams advance to the 19th place match; the last teams advance to the 21st place match.

=== Group I ===
Pos	Team	Pld	W	L	PF	PA	PD	Pts	Qualification
1	Hungary	2	2	0	151	142	+9	4	17th place match
2	Macedonia	2	1	1	150	137	+13	3	19th place match
3	Switzerland	2	0	2	121	143	−22	2	21st place match

Source: FIBA Archive

20 July 2011

Boxscore

Switzerland	65–70	Hungary

Sarajevo

21 July 2011

Boxscore

Hungary	81–77	Macedonia

Sarajevo

=== Group J ===
Pos	Team	Pld	W	L	PF	PA	PD	Pts	Qualification
1	Belarus	2	2	0	214	163	+51	4	17th place match
2	Norway	2	1	1	159	164	−5	3	19th place match
3	Luxembourg	2	0	2	135	181	−46	2	21st place match

Source: FIBA Archive

20 July 2011

Boxscore

Luxembourg	86–99	Belarus

Sarajevo

21 July 2011

Boxscore

Belarus	115–77	Norway

Sarajevo

=== 21st place match ===
23 July 2011

Boxscore

Switzerland	81–74	Luxembourg

Sarajevo

=== 19th place match ===
24 July 2011

Boxscore

Macedonia	97–96	Norway

Sarajevo

=== 17th place match ===
24 July 2011

Boxscore

Hungary	80–88	Belarus

Sarajevo

== 13th−16th place playoffs ==
13th–16th place semifinals
G3	Netherlands	75
H4	Iceland	80
H3	Great Britain	104
G4	Romania	50

13th place match
H4	Iceland	71
H3	Great Britain	83
15th place match
G3	Netherlands	77
G4	Romania	85

=== 13th–16th place semifinals ===
23 July 2011

Boxscore

Netherlands	75–80	Iceland

Sarajevo

23 July 2011

Boxscore

Great Britain	104–50	Romania

Sarajevo

=== 15th place match ===
24 July 2011

Boxscore

Netherlands	77–85	Romania

Sarajevo

=== 13th place match ===
24 July 2011

Boxscore

Iceland	71–83	Great Britain

Sarajevo

== 9th−12th place playoffs ==
9th–12th place semifinals
G1	Poland	100
H2	Israel	94
H1	Finland	84
G2	Slovakia	65

9th place match
G1	Poland	60
H1	Finland	57
11th place match
H2	Israel	88
G2	Slovakia	53

=== 9th–12th place semifinals ===
23 July 2011

Boxscore

Poland	100–94	Israel

Sarajevo

23 July 2011

Boxscore

Finland	84–65	Slovakia

Sarajevo

=== 11th place match ===
24 July 2011

Boxscore

Israel	88–53	Slovakia

Sarajevo

=== 9th place match ===
24 July 2011

Boxscore

Poland	60–57	Finland

Sarajevo

== 5th−8th place playoffs ==
5th–8th place semifinals
E3	Denmark	61
F4	Portugal	83
F3	Bosnia and Herzegovina	78
E4	Bulgaria	65

5th place match
F4	Portugal	71
F3	Bosnia and Herzegovina	67
7th place match
E3	Denmark	72
E4	Bulgaria	58

=== 5th–8th place semifinals ===
23 July 2011

Boxscore

Denmark	61–83	Portugal

Sarajevo

23 July 2011

Boxscore

Bosnia and Herzegovina	78–65	Bulgaria

Sarajevo

=== 7th place match ===
24 July 2011

Boxscore

Denmark	72–58	Bulgaria

Sarajevo

=== 5th place match ===
24 July 2011

Boxscore

Portugal	71–67	Bosnia and Herzegovina

Sarajevo

== Championship playoffs ==
Semifinals
E1	Georgia	74
F2	Czech Republic	72
F1	Belgium	61
E2	Estonia	64

Final
E1	Georgia	79
E2	Estonia	70
3rd place match
F2	Czech Republic	86
F1	Belgium	85

=== Semifinals ===
23 July 2011

Boxscore

Georgia	74–72	Czech Republic

Sarajevo

23 July 2011

Boxscore

Belgium	61–64	Estonia

Sarajevo

=== 3rd place match ===
24 July 2011

Boxscore

Czech Republic	86–85	Belgium

Sarajevo

=== Final ===
24 July 2011

Boxscore

Georgia	79–70	Estonia

Sarajevo

== Final standings ==
Rank	Team
1st place, gold medalist(s)	Georgia
2nd place, silver medalist(s)	Estonia
3rd place, bronze medalist(s)	Czech Republic
4	Belgium
5	Portugal
6	Bosnia and Herzegovina
7	Denmark
8	Bulgaria
9	Poland
10	Finland
11	Israel
12	Slovakia
13	Great Britain
14	Iceland
15	Romania
16	Netherlands
17	Belarus
18	Hungary
19	Macedonia
20	Norway
21	Switzerland
22	Luxembourg

Promoted to the 2012 FIBA Europe Under-20 Championship Division A

== See also ==
- 2011 FIBA Europe Under-20 Championship (Division A)
