= 2012 FIBA Europe Under-20 Championship Division B =

Basketball competition

Tournament details
- Host country: Bulgaria
- City: Sofia
- Dates: 12–22 July 2012
- Teams: 18 (from 1 confederation)
- Venue(s): 2 (in 1 host city)

Final positions
- Champions: Croatia (1st title)
- Runners-up: Czech Republic
- Third place: Israel

Official website
- www.fibaeurope.com

The 2012 FIBA U20 European Championship Division B was the 8th edition of the Division B of the European basketball championship for men's national under-20 teams. It was played from 12 to 22 July 2012 in Sofia, Bulgaria.

== Participating teams ==
- Austria ▼ (15th place, 2011 FIBA Europe Under-20 Championship Division A)
- Belarus
- Belgium
- Bulgaria
- Croatia ▼ (16th place, 2011 FIBA Europe Under-20 Championship Division A)
- Czech Republic
- Denmark
- Finland
- Great Britain
- Hungary
- Israel
- Luxembourg
- Macedonia
- Netherlands
- Poland
- Portugal
- Slovakia
- Switzerland

== First round ==
In the first round, the teams were drawn into four groups. The first two teams from each group advance to the quarterfinal round; the other teams will play in the 9th–18nd place classification groups.

=== Group A ===
Pos	Team	Pld	W	L	PF	PA	PD	Pts	Qualification
1	Bulgaria	3	3	0	222	192	+30	6	Quarterfinal round
2	Israel	3	2	1	223	177	+46	5	Quarterfinal round
3	Austria	3	1	2	165	209	−44	4	9th−18th place classification
4	Slovakia	3	0	3	180	212	−32	3	9th−18th place classification

Source: FIBA Archive

12 July 2012

Boxscore

Slovakia	59–64	Austria

Sofia

12 July 2012

Boxscore

Israel	69–78	Bulgaria

Sofia

14 July 2012

Boxscore

Austria	39–75	Israel

Sofia

14 July 2012

Boxscore

Bulgaria	69–61	Slovakia

Sofia

16 July 2012

Boxscore

Slovakia	60–79	Israel

Sofia

16 July 2012

Boxscore

Bulgaria	75–62	Austria

Sofia

=== Group B ===
Pos	Team	Pld	W	L	PF	PA	PD	Pts	Qualification
1	Poland	4	4	0	370	211	+159	8	Quarterfinal round
2	Belgium	4	3	1	318	209	+109	7	Quarterfinal round
3	Netherlands	4	2	2	197	286	−89	6	9th−18th place classification
4	Macedonia	4	1	3	241	291	−50	5	9th−18th place classification
5	Luxembourg	4	0	4	244	373	−129	4	9th−18th place classification

Source: FIBA Archive

12 July 2012

Boxscore

Belgium	79–49	Macedonia

Sofia

12 July 2012

Boxscore

Netherlands	39–97	Poland

Sofia

13 July 2012

Boxscore

Luxembourg	56–64	Netherlands

Sofia

13 July 2012

Boxscore

Poland	71–59	Belgium

Sofia

14 July 2012

Boxscore

Macedonia	49–83	Poland

Sofia

14 July 2012

Boxscore

Belgium	103–56	Luxembourg

Sofia

15 July 2012

Boxscore

Netherlands	33–77	Belgium

Sofia

15 July 2012

Boxscore

Luxembourg	68–87	Macedonia

Sofia

16 July 2012

Boxscore

Poland	119–64	Luxembourg

Sofia

16 July 2012

Boxscore

Macedonia	56–61	Netherlands

Sofia

=== Group C ===
Pos	Team	Pld	W	L	PF	PA	PD	Pts	Qualification
1	Great Britain	4	3	1	298	271	+27	7	Quarterfinal round
2	Croatia	4	3	1	309	282	+27	7	Quarterfinal round
3	Portugal	4	2	2	267	291	−24	6	9th−18th place classification
4	Denmark	4	1	3	266	297	−31	5	9th−18th place classification
5	Belarus	4	1	3	282	281	+1	5	9th−18th place classification

Source: FIBA Archive

12 July 2012

Boxscore

Great Britain	76–64	Portugal

Sofia

12 July 2012

Boxscore

Belarus	73–77	Croatia

Sofia

13 July 2012

Boxscore

Denmark	79–77	Belarus

Sofia

13 July 2012

Boxscore

Croatia	78–90	Great Britain

Sofia

14 July 2012

Boxscore

Portugal	65–79	Croatia

Sofia

14 July 2012

Boxscore

Great Britain	71–60	Denmark

Sofia

15 July 2012

Boxscore

Belarus	69–61	Great Britain

Sofia

15 July 2012

Boxscore

Denmark	73–74	Portugal

Sofia

16 July 2012

Boxscore

Portugal	64–63	Belarus

Sofia

16 July 2012

Boxscore

Croatia	75–54	Denmark

Sofia

=== Group D ===
Pos	Team	Pld	W	L	PF	PA	PD	Pts	Qualification
1	Czech Republic	3	3	0	221	168	+53	6	Quarterfinal round
2	Finland	3	1	2	219	223	−4	4	Quarterfinal round
3	Hungary	3	1	2	189	212	−23	4	9th−18th place classification
4	Switzerland	3	1	2	182	208	−26	4	9th−18th place classification

Source: FIBA Archive

12 July 2012

Boxscore

Hungary	53–60	Switzerland

Sofia

12 July 2012

Boxscore

Finland	59–74	Czech Republic

Sofia

14 July 2012

Boxscore

Czech Republic	82–51	Hungary

Sofia

14 July 2012

Boxscore

Switzerland	64–90	Finland

Sofia

16 July 2012

Boxscore

Hungary	85–70	Finland

Sofia

16 July 2012

Boxscore

Czech Republic	65–58	Switzerland

Sofia

== Quarterfinal round ==
In this round, the teams play in two groups. The first two teams from each group advance to the semifinals; the other teams will play the 5th–8th place playoffs.

=== Group E ===
Pos	Team	Pld	W	L	PF	PA	PD	Pts	Qualification
1	Bulgaria	3	2	1	218	221	−3	5	Semifinals
2	Israel	3	2	1	214	217	−3	5	Semifinals
3	Poland	3	1	2	214	213	+1	4	5th−8th place playoffs
4	Belgium	3	1	2	207	202	+5	4	5th−8th place playoffs

Source: FIBA Archive

18 July 2012

Boxscore

Bulgaria	62–82	Belgium

Sofia

18 July 2012

Boxscore

Israel	76–73	Poland

Sofia

19 July 2012

Boxscore

Poland	70–78	Bulgaria

Sofia

19 July 2012

Boxscore

Belgium	66–69	Israel

Sofia

=== Group F ===
Pos	Team	Pld	W	L	PF	PA	PD	Pts	Qualification
1	Czech Republic	3	2	1	257	201	+56	5	Semifinals
2	Croatia	3	2	1	239	251	−12	5	Semifinals
3	Great Britain	3	1	2	229	236	−7	4	5th−8th place playoffs
4	Finland	3	1	2	195	232	−37	4	5th−8th place playoffs

Source: FIBA Archive

18 July 2012

Boxscore

Great Britain	64–67	Finland

Sofia

18 July 2012

Boxscore

Croatia	67–92	Czech Republic

Sofia

19 July 2012

Boxscore

Czech Republic	91–75	Great Britain

Sofia

19 July 2012

Boxscore

Finland	69–94	Croatia

Sofia

== 9th–18th place classification ==
In this round, the teams play in two groups of five. The first teams from each group advance to the 9th place match; the second teams advance to the 11th place match; the third teams advance to the 13th place match; the fourth teams advance to the 15th place match; the last teams advance to the 17th place match.

=== Group G ===
Pos	Team	Pld	W	L	PF	PA	PD	Pts	Qualification
1	Austria	4	3	1	313	269	+44	7	9th place match
2	Slovakia	4	3	1	270	223	+47	7	11th place match
3	Netherlands	4	2	2	233	231	+2	6	13th place match
4	Macedonia	4	2	2	288	286	+2	6	15th place match
5	Luxembourg	4	0	4	240	335	−95	4	17st place match

Source: FIBA Archive

18 July 2012

Boxscore

Macedonia	60–80	Slovakia

Sofia

18 July 2012

Boxscore

Austria	108–64	Luxembourg

Sofia

19 July 2012

Boxscore

Netherlands	61–64	Austria

Sofia

19 July 2012

Boxscore

Slovakia	76–52	Luxembourg

Sofia

20 July 2012

Boxscore

Austria	77–85	Macedonia

Sofia

20 July 2012

Boxscore

Netherlands	47–55	Slovakia

Sofia

=== Group H ===
Pos	Team	Pld	W	L	PF	PA	PD	Pts	Qualification
1	Portugal	4	3	1	241	243	−2	7	9th place match
2	Denmark	4	3	1	307	253	+54	7	11th place match
3	Belarus	4	2	2	299	281	+18	6	13th place match
4	Switzerland	4	2	2	237	262	−25	6	15th place match
5	Hungary	4	0	4	223	268	−45	4	17st place match

Source: FIBA Archive

18 July 2012

Boxscore

Denmark	78–47	Switzerland

Sofia

18 July 2012

Boxscore

Hungary	60–70	Belarus

Sofia

19 July 2012

Boxscore

Portugal	61–55	Hungary

Sofia

19 July 2012

Boxscore

Switzerland	78–89	Belarus

Sofia

20 July 2012

Boxscore

Hungary	55–77	Denmark

Sofia

20 July 2012

Boxscore

Portugal	42–52	Switzerland

Sofia

=== 17th place match ===
21 July 2012

Boxscore

Luxembourg	94–86	Hungary

Sofia

=== 15th place match ===
21 July 2012

Boxscore

Macedonia	71–80	Switzerland

Sofia

=== 13th place match ===
22 July 2012

Boxscore

Netherlands	52–64	Belarus

Sofia

=== 11th place match ===
22 July 2012

Boxscore

Slovakia	62–81	Denmark

Sofia

=== 9th place match ===
22 July 2012

Boxscore

Austria	57–66	Portugal

Sofia

== 5th−8th place playoffs ==
5th–8th place semifinals
E3	Poland	83
F4	Finland	70
F3	Great Britain	101
E4	Belgium	100

5th place match
E3	Poland	83
F3	Great Britain	53
7th place match
F4	Finland	70
E4	Belgium	84

=== 5th–8th place semifinals ===
21 July 2012

Boxscore

Poland	83–70	Finland

Sofia

21 July 2012

Boxscore

Great Britain	101–100	Belgium

Sofia

=== 7th place match ===
22 July 2012

Boxscore

Finland	70–84	Belgium

Sofia

=== 5th place match ===
22 July 2012

Boxscore

Poland	83–53	Great Britain

Sofia

== Championship playoffs ==
Semifinals
E1	Bulgaria	79
F2	Croatia	85
F1	Czech Republic	72
E2	Israel	61

Final
F2	Croatia	88
F1	Czech Republic	80
3rd place match
E1	Bulgaria	67
E2	Israel	101

=== Semifinals ===
21 July 2012

Boxscore

Bulgaria	79–85	Croatia

Sofia

21 July 2012

Boxscore

Czech Republic	72–61	Israel

Sofia

=== 3rd place match ===
22 July 2012

Boxscore

Bulgaria	67–101	Israel

Sofia

=== Final ===
22 July 2012

Boxscore

Croatia	88–80	Czech Republic

Sofia

== Final standings ==
Rank	Team
1st place, gold medalist(s)	Croatia
2nd place, silver medalist(s)	Czech Republic
3rd place, bronze medalist(s)	Israel
4	Bulgaria
5	Poland
6	Great Britain
7	Belgium
8	Finland
9	Portugal
10	Austria
11	Denmark
12	Slovakia
13	Belarus
14	Netherlands
15	Switzerland
16	Macedonia
17	Luxembourg
18	Hungary

Promoted to the 2013 FIBA Europe Under-20 Championship Division A

== See also ==
- 2012 FIBA Europe Under-20 Championship (Division A)
