= Austria men's national under-20 basketball team =

Austria
- FIBA zone: FIBA Europe
- National federation: Austrian Basketball Federation

U20 EuroBasket
- Appearances: 1
- Medals: None

U20 EuroBasket Division B
- Appearances: 11
- Medals: Gold: 1 (2010)

The Austria men's national under-20 basketball team is a national basketball team of Austria, administered by the Austrian Basketball Federation. It represents the country in international under-20 men's basketball competitions.

== FIBA U20 EuroBasket participations ==
Year	Division A	Division B
2006		8th
2007		12th
2008		10th
2009		5th
2010		1st place, gold medalist(s)
2011	15th	

Year	Division A	Division B
2012		10th
2014		11th
2015		15th
2022		17th
2023		12th
2025		15th

== See also ==
- Austria men's national basketball team
- Austria men's national under-18 basketball team
- Austria women's national under-20 basketball team
