= Iceland men's national under-20 basketball team =

Iceland
- FIBA zone: FIBA Europe
- National federation: KKÍ

U20 EuroBasket
- Appearances: 5
- Medals: None

U20 EuroBasket Division B
- Appearances: 7
- Medals: Silver: 3 (2016, 2022, 2026)
Home	Away

The Iceland men's national under-20 basketball team is a national basketball team of Iceland, administered by the Icelandic Basketball Association. It represents the country in international under-20 men's basketball competitions.

== History ==
Iceland competed at the 2017 FIBA U20 European Championship where the team made it to the final eight before bowing out against Israel.

== FIBA U20 EuroBasket participations ==
Year	Division A	Division B
2005		12th
2006		12th
2011		14th
2016		2nd place, silver medalist(s)
2017	8th	
2018	15th	
2019		7th
2022		2nd place, silver medalist(s)
2023	12th	
2024	13th	
2025	14th	
2026		2nd place, silver medalist(s)

== See also ==
- Iceland men's national basketball team
- Iceland men's national under-19 basketball team
- Iceland women's national under-20 basketball team
