= Poland men's national under-20 basketball team =

Poland
- FIBA zone: FIBA Europe
- National federation: Polish Basketball Federation

U20 EuroBasket
- Appearances: 9
- Medals: None

U20 EuroBasket Division B
- Appearances: 12
- Medals: Gold: 2 (2013, 2018); Bronze: 3 (2005, 2009, 2010)

The Poland men's national under-20 basketball team is a national basketball team of Poland, administered by the Polish Basketball Federation. It represents the country in international under-20 men's basketball competitions.

== FIBA U20 EuroBasket participations ==
Year	Division A	Division B
1992	11th	
2005		3rd place, bronze medalist(s)
2006		4th
2007		5th
2008		13th
2009		3rd place, bronze medalist(s)
2010		3rd place, bronze medalist(s)
2011		9th
2012		5th
2013		1st place, gold medalist(s)
2014	9th	

Year	Division A	Division B
2015	14th	
2016		6th
2017		5th
2018		1st place, gold medalist(s)
2019	14th	
2022	13th	
2023	15th	
2024	8th	
2025	10th	
2026	11th	

== See also ==
- Poland men's national basketball team
- Poland men's national under-19 basketball team
- Poland women's national under-20 basketball team
