= Georgia men's national under-20 basketball team =

Georgia
- FIBA zone: FIBA Europe
- National federation: Georgian Basketball Federation

U20 EuroBasket
- Appearances: 4
- Medals: None

U20 EuroBasket Division B
- Appearances: 16
- Medals: Gold: 2 (2006, 2011)

The Georgia men's national under-20 basketball team is a national basketball team of Georgia, administered by the Georgian Basketball Federation. It represents the country in international under-20 men's basketball competitions.

== FIBA U20 EuroBasket participations ==
Year	Division A	Division B
2005		4th
2006		1st place, gold medalist(s)
2007	12th	
2008	16th	
2009		8th
2010		13th
2011		1st place, gold medalist(s)
2012	16th	
2013	20th	
2014		10th

Year	Division A	Division B
2015		11th
2016		8th
2017		7th
2018		13th
2019		8th
2022		11th
2023		14th
2024		5th
2025		20th
2026		15th

== See also ==
- Georgia men's national basketball team
- Georgia men's national under-18 basketball team
- Georgia women's national under-20 basketball team
