= Sweden men's national under-20 basketball team =

Youth basketball team representing Sweden

Sweden
- FIBA zone: FIBA Europe
- National federation: Swedish Basketball Federation

U20 EuroBasket
- Appearances: 7
- Medals: None

U20 EuroBasket Division B
- Appearances: 13
- Medals: Silver: 2 (2010, 2015); Bronze: 2 (2008, 2026)

The Sweden men's national under-20 basketball team is a national basketball team of Sweden, administered by the Swedish Basketball Federation. It represents the country in international under-20 men's basketball competitions.

== FIBA U20 EuroBasket participations ==
Year	Division A	Division B
2005		7th
2006		11th
2007		9th
2008		3rd place, bronze medalist(s)
2009		4th
2010		2nd place, silver medalist(s)
2011	9th	
2012	13th	
2013	16th	
2014	19th	

Year	Division A	Division B
2015		2nd place, silver medalist(s)
2016	10th	
2017	12th	
2018	14th	
2019		9th
2022		5th
2023		4th
2024		15th
2025		9th
2026		3rd place, bronze medalist(s)

== See also ==
- Sweden men's national basketball team
- Sweden men's national under-18 basketball team
- Sweden women's national under-20 basketball team
