= Portugal men's national under-20 basketball team =

Portugal
- FIBA zone: FIBA Europe
- National federation: Portuguese Basketball Federation

U20 EuroBasket
- Appearances: 1
- Medals: None

U20 EuroBasket Division B
- Appearances: 19
- Medals: Gold: 1 (2019)

The Portugal men's national under-20 basketball team is a national basketball team of Portugal, administered by the Portuguese Basketball Federation. It represents the country in international under-20 men's basketball competitions.

== FIBA U20 EuroBasket participations ==
Year	Division A	Division B
2005		9th
2006		10th
2007		15th
2008		6th
2009		15th
2010		7th
2011		5th
2012		9th
2013		5th
2014		6th

Year	Division A	Division B
2015		9th
2016		11th
2017		8th
2018		9th
2019		1st place, gold medalist(s)
2022	14th	
2023		6th
2024		7th
2025		10th
2026		4th

== See also ==
- Portugal men's national basketball team
- Portugal men's national under-19 basketball team
- Portugal women's national under-20 basketball team
