= Switzerland men's national under-20 basketball team =

Youth national basketball team of Switzerland

Switzerland
- FIBA zone: FIBA Europe
- National federation: Swiss Basketball

U20 EuroBasket
- Appearances: None

U20 EuroBasket Division B
- Appearances: 15
- Medals: None

The Switzerland men's national under-20 basketball team is a national basketball team of Switzerland, administered by the Swiss Basketball. It represents the country in international under-20 men's basketball competitions.

== FIBA U20 EuroBasket participations ==
Year	Result in Division B
2006	15th
2007	16th
2008	17th
2009	12th
2010	16th
2011	21st
2012	15th
2013	6th

Year	Result in Division B
2014	14th
2015	13th
2022	14th
2023	7th
2024	17th
2025	4th
2026	13th

== See also ==
- Switzerland men's national basketball team
- Switzerland men's national under-18 basketball team
- Switzerland women's national under-20 basketball team
