= Romania men's national under-20 basketball team =

Romania
- FIBA zone: FIBA Europe
- National federation: Romanian Basketball Federation

U20 EuroBasket
- Appearances: 4
- Medals: None

U20 EuroBasket Division B
- Appearances: 13
- Medals: Gold: 2 (2017, 2024)

The Romania men's national under-20 basketball team is a national basketball team of Romania, administered by the Romanian Basketball Federation. It represents the country in international under-20 men's basketball competitions.

== FIBA U20 EuroBasket participations ==
Year	Division A	Division B
1992	9th	
2007		17th
2008		5th
2009		17th
2010		14th
2011		15th
2013		7th
2014		9th
2015		17th

Year	Division A	Division B
2016		10th
2017		1st place, gold medalist(s)
2018	16th	
2019		17th
2022		16th
2024		1st place, gold medalist(s)
2025	11th	
2026	16th	

== See also ==
- Romania men's national basketball team
- Romania men's national under-19 basketball team
- Romania women's national under-20 basketball team
