= Czech Republic men's national under-20 basketball team =

Czech Republic
- FIBA zone: FIBA Europe
- National federation: Czech Basketball Federation

U20 EuroBasket
- Appearances: 13
- Medals: None

U20 EuroBasket Division B
- Appearances: 9
- Medals: Gold: 1 (2023); Silver: 3 (2009, 2012, 2019); Bronze: 1 (2011)

The Czech Republic men's national under-20 basketball team is a national basketball team of the Czech Republic, administered by the Czech Basketball Federation. It represents the country in international under-20 men's basketball competitions.

== FIBA U20 EuroBasket participations ==
Year	Division A	Division B
2000	12th	
2004	8th	
2005	16th	
2006		5th
2007		13th
2008		9th
2009		2nd place, silver medalist(s)
2010	16th	
2011		3rd place, bronze medalist(s)
2012		2nd place, silver medalist(s)
2013	17th	

Year	Division A	Division B
2014	17th	
2015	6th	
2016	7th	
2017	15th	
2018		6th
2019		2nd place, silver medalist(s)
2022	15th	
2023		1st place, gold medalist(s)
2024	6th	
2025	9th	
2026	14th	

== See also ==
- Czech Republic men's national basketball team
- Czech Republic men's national under-18 basketball team
- Czech Republic women's national under-20 basketball team
