= Hungary men's national under-20 basketball team =

Youth basketball team representing Hungary

Hungary
- FIBA zone: FIBA Europe
- National federation: Hungarian Basketball Federation

U20 EuroBasket
- Appearances: 4
- Medals: None

U20 EuroBasket Division B
- Appearances: 16
- Medals: Silver: 1 (2005); Bronze: 2 (2013, 2015)

The Hungary men's national under-20 basketball team is a national basketball team of Hungary, administered by the Hungarian Basketball Federation. It represents the country in international under-20 men's basketball competitions.

== FIBA U20 EuroBasket participations ==
Year	Division A	Division B
2005		2nd place, silver medalist(s)
2006	14th	
2007	16th	
2008		12th
2009		14th
2010		11th
2011		18th
2012		18th
2013		3rd place, bronze medalist(s)
2014	20th	

Year	Division A	Division B
2015		3rd place, bronze medalist(s)
2016	16th	
2017		11th
2018		10th
2019		14th
2022		10th
2023		15th
2024		6th
2025		11th
2026		8th

== See also ==
- Hungary men's national basketball team
- Hungary men's national under-18 basketball team
- Hungary women's national under-20 basketball team
