= North Macedonia men's national under-20 basketball team =

National basketball team of North Macedonia

North Macedonia
- FIBA zone: FIBA Europe
- National federation: Basketball Federation of North Macedonia

U20 EuroBasket
- Appearances: 3
- Medals: None

U20 EuroBasket Division B
- Appearances: 14
- Medals: Silver: 2 (2006, 2023)

The North Macedonia men's national under-20 basketball team is a national basketball team of North Macedonia, administered by the Basketball Federation of North Macedonia. It represents the country in international under-20 men's basketball competitions.

== FIBA U20 EuroBasket participations ==
Year	Division A	Division B
2000	11th	
2006		2nd place, silver medalist(s)
2007	15th	
2008		8th
2009		6th
2011		19th
2012		16th
2015		7th
2016		14th

Year	Division A	Division B
2017		13th
2018		12th
2019		16th
2022		8th
2023		2nd place, silver medalist(s)
2024	15th	
2025		17th
2026		9th

== See also ==
- North Macedonia men's national basketball team
- North Macedonia men's national under-18 basketball team
- North Macedonia women's national under-20 basketball team
