= Belgium men's national under-20 basketball team =

Belgium
- FIBA zone: FIBA Europe
- National federation: Basketball Belgium

U20 EuroBasket
- Appearances: 10
- Medals: None

U20 EuroBasket Division B
- Appearances: 12
- Medals: Silver: 2 (2008, 2014); Bronze: 1 (2019)

The Belgium men's national under-20 basketball team is a national basketball team of Belgium, administered by the Basketball Belgium. It represents the country in international under-20 men's basketball competitions.

== FIBA U20 EuroBasket participations ==
Year	Division A	Division B
1992	8th	
1996	12th	
2005		5th
2006		6th
2007		10th
2008		2nd place, silver medalist(s)
2009	16th	
2010		8th
2011		4th
2012		7th
2013		4th

Year	Division A	Division B
2014		2nd place, silver medalist(s)
2015	8th	
2016	14th	
2017		6th
2018		8th
2019		3rd place, bronze medalist(s)
2022	8th	
2023	4th	
2024	4th	
2025	12th	
2026	15th	

== See also ==
- Belgium men's national basketball team
- Belgium men's national under-19 basketball team
- Belgium women's national under-20 basketball team
