= Slovakia men's national under-20 basketball team =

Slovakia
- FIBA zone: FIBA Europe
- National federation: Slovak Basketball Association

U20 EuroBasket
- Appearances: 1
- Medals: None

U20 EuroBasket Division B
- Appearances: 19
- Medals: None

The Slovakia men's national under-20 basketball team is a national basketball team of Slovakia, administered by the Slovak Basketball Association. It represents the country in international under-20 men's basketball competitions.

== FIBA U20 EuroBasket participations ==
Year	Division A	Division B
1994	12th	
2005		6th
2006		13th
2007		7th
2008		14th
2009		10th
2010		12th
2011		12th
2012		12th
2013		9th

Year	Division A	Division B
2015		10th
2016		16th
2017		16th
2018		17th
2019		15th
2022		19th
2023		18th
2024		8th
2025		18th
2026		19th

== See also ==
- Slovakia men's national basketball team
- Slovakia men's national under-18 basketball team
- Slovakia women's national under-20 basketball team
