= 2021 FIBA U20 European Challengers =

International basketball competitions

Tournament details
- Dates: 19–25 July 2021
- Teams: 26
- Venues: 4 (in 4 host cities)

Official website
- www.fiba.basketball

The 2021 FIBA U20 European Challengers were international basketball competitions which took place from 19 to 25 July 2021, replacing the cancelled 2021 FIBA U20 European Championship.

== History ==
The 2020 edition of FIBA U20 European Championship was to be held in Klaipėda, Lithuania, but was postponed to 2021 due to COVID-19 pandemic. Since the pandemic continued in 2021, the FIBA Europe decided to hold alternative format of competition to replace traditional format of U20 European Championship where 16 or more teams gather in one place.

== Structure ==
- The events are to be played on a voluntary participation basis, with promotion/relegation to be frozen across Divisions A, B and C.
- The Top 18 ranked teams (16 currently in Division A, plus two additional teams by 2019 ranking in respective category) to play three tournaments of six teams each (Groups A, B and C).
- All other registered teams, ranked 19 and lower, to play in tournaments of up to six teams each (Groups D/E).
- All tournaments to be played in Round Robin format, with groups to be created by "serpentine" style allocation, taking the hosting situation into consideration.

== Participating teams ==
Top-18 Challengers

- Albania
- Belgium
- Bulgaria
- Czech Republic
- Croatia
- France
- Georgia
- Germany
- Greece
- Israel
- Italy
- Poland
- Portugal
- Russia
- Slovenia
- Spain
- Turkey
- Ukraine

19–26 Challenger

- Belarus
- Hungary
- Kosovo
- Luxembourg
- North Macedonia
- Romania
- Slovakia
- Switzerland

== Top-18 Challengers ==
=== Group A ===
The Group A tournament was played in Brno, Czech Republic.

Pos	Team	Pld	W	L	PF	PA	PD	Pts
1	Czech Republic	5	4	1	385	306	+79	9
2	Spain	5	4	1	359	273	+86	9
3	Croatia	5	3	2	389	333	+56	8
4	Italy	5	3	2	326	297	+29	8
5	Portugal	5	1	4	302	371	−69	6
6	Albania	5	0	5	226	407	−181	5

Source: FIBA
Rules for classification: 1) Points; 2) Head-to-head results; 3) Points difference; 4) Points scored.

20 July 2021

Boxscore

Portugal	66–89	Croatia

20 July 2021

Boxscore

Italy	66–63	Czech Republic

20 July 2021

Boxscore

Albania	36–73	Spain

21 July 2021

Boxscore

Croatia	71–57	Italy

21 July 2021

Boxscore

Czech Republic	91–47	Albania

21 July 2021

Boxscore

Spain	68–54	Portugal

22 July 2021

Boxscore

Albania	46–99	Croatia

22 July 2021

Boxscore

Czech Republic	71–65	Spain

22 July 2021

Boxscore

Italy	81–50	Portugal

24 July 2021

Boxscore

Spain	70–50	Italy

24 July 2021

Boxscore

Croatia	68–81	Czech Republic

24 July 2021

Boxscore

Portugal	72–54	Albania

25 July 2021

Boxscore

Croatia	62–83	Spain

25 July 2021

Boxscore

Czech Republic	79–60	Portugal

25 July 2021

Boxscore

Albania	43–72	Italy

=== Group B ===
The Group B tournament was played in Tbilisi, Georgia.

Pos	Team	Pld	W	L	PF	PA	PD	Pts
1	France	5	5	0	420	340	+80	10
2	Germany	5	4	1	417	313	+104	9
3	Bulgaria	5	2	3	369	398	−29	7
4	Poland	5	2	3	384	413	−29	7
5	Georgia	5	1	4	348	420	−72	6
6	Turkey	5	1	4	364	418	−54	6

Source: FIBA
Rules for classification: 1) Points; 2) Head-to-head results; 3) Points difference; 4) Points scored.

20 July 2021

Boxscore

Germany	87–66	Poland

20 July 2021

Boxscore

Bulgaria	71–78	Turkey

20 July 2021

Boxscore

Georgia	63–84	France

21 July 2021

Boxscore

Poland	79–86	Bulgaria

21 July 2021

Boxscore

France	65–62	Germany

21 July 2021

Boxscore

Turkey	69–77	Georgia

22 July 2021

Boxscore

Bulgaria	63–95	France

22 July 2021

Boxscore

Poland	82–73	Turkey

22 July 2021

Boxscore

Germany	96–55	Georgia

24 July 2021

Boxscore

Turkey	62–98	Germany

24 July 2021

Boxscore

France	86–70	Poland

24 July 2021

Boxscore

Georgia	72–84	Bulgaria

25 July 2021

Boxscore

France	90–82	Turkey

25 July 2021

Boxscore

Bulgaria	65–74	Germany

25 July 2021

Boxscore

Poland	87–81	Georgia

=== Group C ===
The Group C tournament was played in Heraklion, Greece.

Pos	Team	Pld	W	L	PF	PA	PD	Pts
1	Slovenia	5	5	0	391	299	+92	10
2	Israel	5	3	2	374	337	+37	8
3	Greece	5	3	2	381	351	+30	8
4	Belgium	5	3	2	329	331	−2	8
5	Russia	5	1	4	342	357	−15	6
6	Ukraine	5	0	5	276	418	−142	5

Source: FIBA
Rules for classification: 1) Points; 2) Head-to-head results; 3) Points difference; 4) Points scored.

19 July 2021

Boxscore

Belgium	59–74	Slovenia

19 July 2021

Boxscore

Ukraine	49–88	Greece

19 July 2021

Boxscore

Russia	72–78	Israel

20 July 2021

Boxscore

Slovenia	81–61	Ukraine

20 July 2021

Boxscore

Greece	84–70	Russia

20 July 2021

Boxscore

Israel	75–49	Belgium

21 July 2021

Boxscore

Russia	79–47	Ukraine

21 July 2021

Boxscore

Belgium	78–64	Greece

21 July 2021

Boxscore

Israel	59–69	Slovenia

23 July 2021

Boxscore

Ukraine	54–78	Belgium

23 July 2021

Boxscore

Greece	82–70	Israel

23 July 2021

Boxscore

Slovenia	83–57	Russia

24 July 2021

Boxscore

Israel	92–65	Ukraine

24 July 2021

Boxscore

Belgium	65–64	Russia

24 July 2021

Boxscore

Greece	63–84	Slovenia

== 19–26 Challenger ==
The Groups D/E tournament was played in Sopron, Hungary.

=== Group phase ===
==== Group D ====
Pos	Team	Pld	W	L	PF	PA	PD	Pts	Qualification
1	Switzerland	3	2	1	238	192	+46	5	19–26 Challenger Final Four
2	North Macedonia	3	2	1	217	214	+3	5	19–26 Challenger Final Four
3	Luxembourg	3	2	1	195	208	−13	5	19–26 Challenger Consolation round
4	Romania	3	0	3	204	240	−36	3	19–26 Challenger Consolation round

Source: FIBA
Rules for classification: 1) Points; 2) Head-to-head results; 3) Points difference; 4) Points scored.

20 July 2021

Boxscore

North Macedonia	73–57	Luxembourg

20 July 2021

Boxscore

Switzerland	92–58	Romania

21 July 2021

Boxscore

Romania	78–79	North Macedonia

21 July 2021

Boxscore

Luxembourg	69–67	Switzerland

22 July 2021

Boxscore

Romania	68–69	Luxembourg

22 July 2021

Boxscore

North Macedonia	65–79	Switzerland

==== Group E ====
Pos	Team	Pld	W	L	PF	PA	PD	Pts	Qualification
1	Hungary	3	3	0	264	191	+73	6	19–26 Challenger Final Four
2	Belarus	3	2	1	243	217	+26	5	19–26 Challenger Final Four
3	Slovakia	3	1	2	219	214	+5	4	19–26 Challenger Consolation round
4	Kosovo	3	0	3	170	274	−104	3	19–26 Challenger Consolation round

Source: FIBA
Rules for classification: 1) Points; 2) Head-to-head results; 3) Points difference; 4) Points scored.

20 July 2021

Boxscore

Belarus	101–60	Kosovo

20 July 2021

Boxscore

Hungary	79–74	Slovakia

21 July 2021

Boxscore

Slovakia	64–71	Belarus

21 July 2021

Boxscore

Kosovo	46–92	Hungary

22 July 2021

Boxscore

Slovakia	81–64	Kosovo

22 July 2021

Boxscore

Belarus	71–93	Hungary

=== Consolation round ===
23rd–26th place semifinals
D3 Luxembourg	84
E4 Kosovo	80
E3 Slovakia	83
D4 Romania	57

23rd place match
D3 Luxembourg	53
E3 Slovakia	72
25th place match
E4 Kosovo	88
D4 Romania	93

==== 23rd–26th place semifinals ====
24 July 2021

Boxscore

Luxembourg	84–80	Kosovo

24 July 2021

Boxscore

Slovakia	83–57	Romania

==== 25th place match ====
25 July 2021

Boxscore

Kosovo	88–93	Romania

==== 23rd place match ====
25 July 2021

Boxscore

Luxembourg	53–72	Slovakia

=== Final Four ===
19th–22nd place semifinals
D1 Switzerland	65
E2 Belarus	74
E1 Hungary	99
D2 North Macedonia	44

19th place match
E2 Belarus	62
E1 Hungary	81
21st place match
D1 Switzerland	71
D2 North Macedonia	53

==== 19th–22nd place semifinals ====
24 July 2021

Boxscore

Switzerland	65–74	Belarus

24 July 2021

Boxscore

Hungary	99–44	North Macedonia

==== 21st place match ====
25 July 2021

Boxscore

Switzerland	71–53	North Macedonia

==== 19th place match ====
25 July 2021

Boxscore

Belarus	62–81	Hungary

=== Final standings ===
Rank	Team
19	Hungary
20	Belarus
21	Switzerland
22	North Macedonia
23	Slovakia
24	Luxembourg
25	Romania
26	Kosovo

== See also ==
- 2021 FIBA U18 European Challengers
- 2021 FIBA U16 European Challengers
- 2021 FIBA U20 Women's European Challengers
- 2021 FIBA U18 Women's European Challengers
- 2021 FIBA U16 Women's European Challengers
