= Fedor Žugić =

Montenegrin basketball player

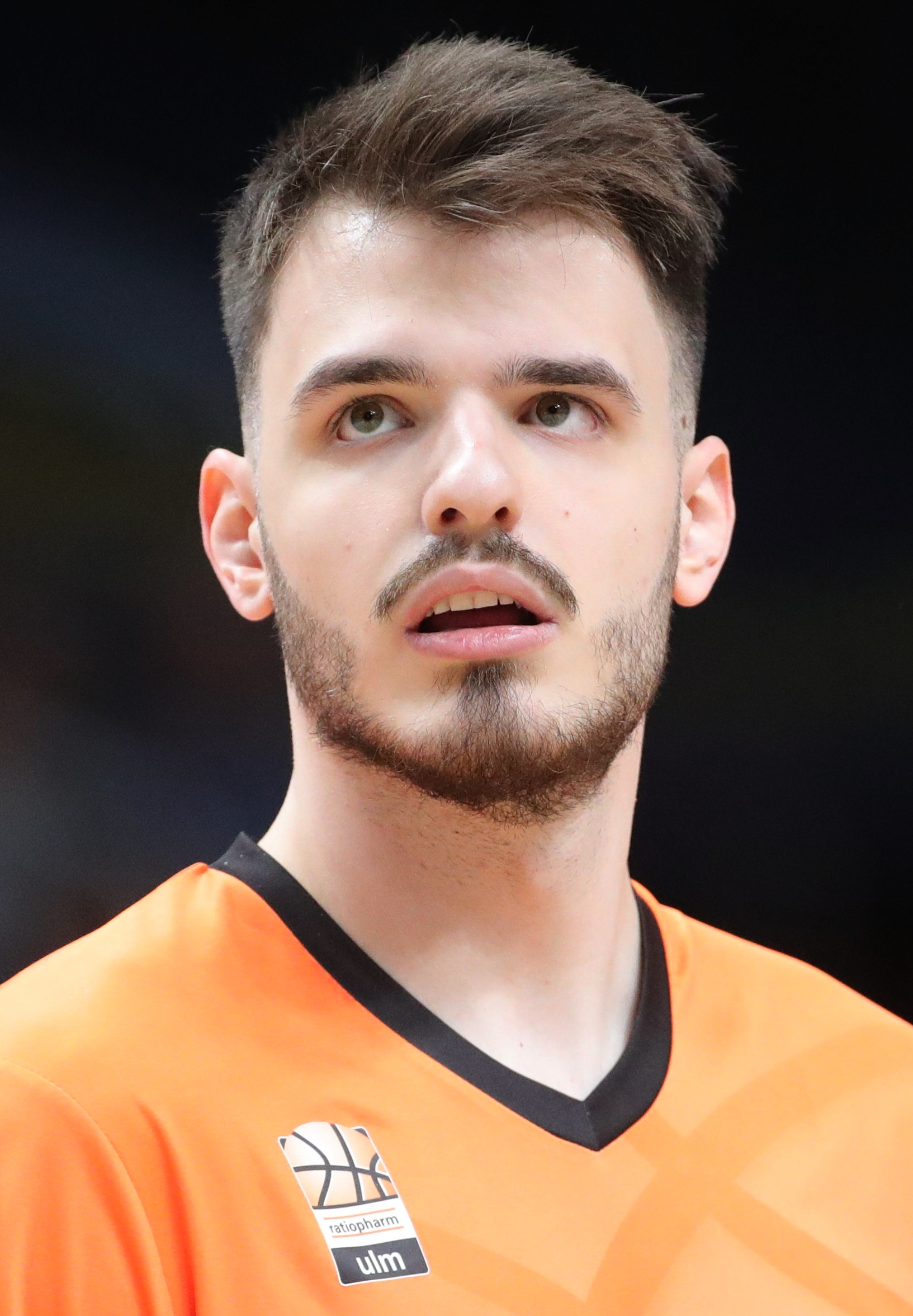
- Žugić in 2023

No. 77 – Santa Clara Broncos
- Position: Shooting guard
- League: West Coast Conference

Personal information
- Born: 18 September 2003 (age 23) Kotor, Serbia and Montenegro
- Listed height: 1.96 m (6 ft 5 in)
- Listed weight: 85 kg (187 lb)

Career information
- College: Creighton (2024–2026); Santa Clara (2026–present)
- Playing career: 2018–present

Career history
- 2018–2021: Budućnost
- 2018–2020: →Studentski centar
- 2021–2024: Ratiopharm Ulm
- 2023–2024: →BG Göttingen

Career highlights
- German League champion (2023); Montenegrin League champion (2021); Montenegrin Cup winner (2021)
Medals
Men's basketball
Representing Montenegro
FIBA U20 European Championship
Bronze medal – third place	2022 Montenegro	Team

Fedor Žugić (born 18 September 2003) is a Montenegrin college basketball player for the Santa Clara Broncos of the West Coast Conference.

He is the youngest player in history to play in the EuroLeague.

== Professional career ==
On February 22, 2019, Žugić made his debut for Budućnost in the EuroLeague against Žalgiris Kaunas. At 15 years and 157 days of age, he became the youngest player to ever play in the EuroLeague.

On July 2, 2021, he has signed with Ratiopharm Ulm of the German Basketball Bundesliga. Previously declared, Žugić subsequently withdrawn his name from consideration for the 2022 NBA draft. In 2022–23, he captured the German championship title with the Ulm team.

On July 20, 2023, he signed with BG Göttingen of the Basketball Bundesliga.

== College career ==
On October 1, 2026, Žugić transferred to Santa Clara.

== National team career ==
In July 2022, Žugić was a member of the Montenegro under-20 team that won a bronze medal at the FIBA U20 European Championship in Podgorica, Montenegro. Over seven tournament games, he averaged 18 points, 3.1 rebounds, and 3 assists per game. He won a spot on the all-tournament team.

== See also ==
- List of youngest EuroLeague players
