= 2010 FIBA Europe Under-20 Championship Division B =

Tournament details
- Host country: Austria
- City: Oberwart, Güssing
- Dates: 14–24 July 2010
- Teams: 17 (from 1 confederation)
- Venue(s): 2 (in 2 host cities)

Final positions
- Champions: Austria (1st title)
- Runners-up: Sweden
- Third place: Poland

Official website
- www.fibaeurope.com

The 2010 FIBA U20 European Championship Division B was the 6th edition of the Division B of the European basketball championship for men's national under-20 teams. It was played from 14 to 24 July 2010 in Oberwart and Güssing, Austria.

== Participating teams ==
- Austria
- Belarus
- Belgium ▼ (16th place, 2009 FIBA Europe Under-20 Championship Division A)
- Bulgaria
- Denmark
- Finland
- Georgia
- Great Britain
- Hungary
- Israel ▼ (15th place, 2009 FIBA Europe Under-20 Championship Division A)
- Norway
- Poland
- Portugal
- Romania
- Slovakia
- Sweden
- Switzerland

== First round ==
In the first round, the teams were drawn into four groups. The first three teams from each group advance to the quarterfinal round; the other teams will play in the 13th−17th place classification group.

=== Group A ===
Pos	Team	Pld	W	L	PF	PA	PD	Pts	Qualification
1	Sweden	3	2	1	231	213	+18	5	Quarterfinal round
2	Israel	3	2	1	241	230	+11	5	Quarterfinal round
3	Hungary	3	1	2	228	240	−12	4	Quarterfinal round
4	Georgia	3	1	2	227	244	−17	4	13th−17th place classification

Source: FIBA Archive

14 July 2010

Boxscore

Israel	67–71	Sweden

Güssing

14 July 2010

Boxscore

Hungary	83–67	Georgia

Güssing

16 July 2010

Boxscore

Georgia	81–88	Israel

Oberwart

16 July 2010

Boxscore

Sweden	87–67	Hungary

Oberwart

18 July 2010

Boxscore

Israel	86–78	Hungary

Oberwart

18 July 2010

Boxscore

Georgia	79–73	Sweden

Oberwart

=== Group B ===
Pos	Team	Pld	W	L	PF	PA	PD	Pts	Qualification
1	Bulgaria	3	3	0	258	194	+64	6	Quarterfinal round
2	Portugal	3	2	1	255	257	−2	5	Quarterfinal round
3	Finland	3	1	2	239	226	+13	4	Quarterfinal round
4	Switzerland	3	0	3	191	266	−75	3	13th−17th place classification

Source: FIBA Archive

14 July 2010

Boxscore

Bulgaria	91–86	Portugal

Oberwart

14 July 2010

Boxscore

Switzerland	64–92	Finland

Oberwart

16 July 2010

Boxscore

Finland	49–63	Bulgaria

Güssing

16 July 2010

Boxscore

Portugal	70–68	Switzerland

Güssing

18 July 2010

Boxscore

Bulgaria	104–59	Switzerland

Oberwart

18 July 2010

Boxscore

Finland	98–99	Portugal

Oberwart

=== Group C ===
Pos	Team	Pld	W	L	PF	PA	PD	Pts	Qualification
1	Austria	3	2	1	242	214	+28	5	Quarterfinal round
2	Great Britain	3	2	1	223	208	+15	5	Quarterfinal round
3	Belgium	3	1	2	207	216	−9	4	Quarterfinal round
4	Denmark	3	1	2	184	218	−34	4	13th−17th place classification

Source: FIBA Archive

14 July 2010

Boxscore

Belgium	79–88	Austria

Oberwart

14 July 2010

Boxscore

Great Britain	79–65	Denmark

Oberwart

16 July 2010

Boxscore

Denmark	55–76	Belgium

Oberwart

16 July 2010

Boxscore

Austria	91–71	Great Britain

Oberwart

18 July 2010

Boxscore

Belgium	52–73	Great Britain

Güssing

18 July 2010

Boxscore

Denmark	64–63	Austria

Güssing

=== Group D ===
Pos	Team	Pld	W	L	PF	PA	PD	Pts	Qualification
1	Poland	4	4	0	372	253	+119	8	Quarterfinal round
2	Norway	4	3	1	288	247	+41	7	Quarterfinal round
3	Slovakia	4	2	2	252	281	−29	6	Quarterfinal round
4	Belarus	4	1	3	210	291	−81	5	13th−17th place classification
5	Romania	4	0	4	258	308	−50	4	13th−17th place classification

Source: FIBA Archive

14 July 2010

Boxscore

Belarus	35–80	Norway

Güssing

14 July 2010

Boxscore

Slovakia	76–62	Romania

Güssing

15 July 2010

Boxscore

Poland	98–54	Slovakia

Oberwart

15 July 2010

Boxscore

Romania	60–66	Belarus

Oberwart

16 July 2010

Boxscore

Norway	70–63	Romania

Güssing

16 July 2010

Boxscore

Belarus	56–87	Poland

Güssing

17 July 2010

Boxscore

Slovakia	64–53	Belarus

Oberwart

17 July 2010

Boxscore

Poland	91–70	Norway

Oberwart

18 July 2010

Boxscore

Norway	68–58	Slovakia

Güssing

18 July 2010

Boxscore

Romania	73–96	Poland

Güssing

== Quarterfinal round ==
In this round, the teams play in two groups of six. The first two teams from each group advance to the semifinals; the third and fourth teams advance to the 5th–8th place playoffs; the other teams will play the 9th–12th place playoffs.

=== Group E ===
Pos	Team	Pld	W	L	PF	PA	PD	Pts	Qualification
1	Sweden	5	4	1	396	358	+38	9	Semifinals
2	Bulgaria	5	4	1	366	323	+43	9	Semifinals
3	Israel	5	3	2	352	330	+22	8	5th−8th place playoffs
4	Portugal	5	2	3	401	417	−16	7	5th−8th place playoffs
5	Finland	5	2	3	379	376	+3	7	9th−12th place playoffs
6	Hungary	5	0	5	338	428	−90	5	9th−12th place playoffs

Source: FIBA Archive

19 July 2010

Boxscore

Portugal	57–64	Israel

Oberwart

19 July 2010

Boxscore

Finland	84–77	Sweden

Güssing

19 July 2010

Boxscore

Hungary	57–89	Bulgaria

Oberwart

20 July 2010

Boxscore

Sweden	87–79	Portugal

Oberwart

20 July 2010

Boxscore

Finland	86–59	Hungary

Oberwart

20 July 2010

Boxscore

Israel	57–62	Bulgaria

Güssing

21 July 2010

Boxscore

Israel	78–62	Finland

Oberwart

21 July 2010

Boxscore

Portugal	80–77	Hungary

Güssing

21 July 2010

Boxscore

Bulgaria	61–74	Sweden

Oberwart

=== Group F ===
Pos	Team	Pld	W	L	PF	PA	PD	Pts	Qualification
1	Austria	5	4	1	390	353	+37	9	Semifinals
2	Poland	5	4	1	444	372	+72	9	Semifinals
3	Great Britain	5	4	1	407	345	+62	9	5th−8th place playoffs
4	Belgium	5	2	3	370	390	−20	7	5th−8th place playoffs
5	Norway	5	1	4	310	378	−68	6	9th−12th place playoffs
6	Slovakia	5	0	5	319	402	−83	5	9th−12th place playoffs

Source: FIBA Archive

19 July 2010

Boxscore

Norway	47–83	Great Britain

Oberwart

19 July 2010

Boxscore

Slovakia	65–72	Austria

Oberwart

19 July 2010

Boxscore

Belgium	72–84	Poland

Güssing

20 July 2010

Boxscore

Slovakia	76–82	Belgium

Oberwart

20 July 2010

Boxscore

Austria	61–56	Norway

Güssing

20 July 2010

Boxscore

Great Britain	98–89	Poland

Oberwart

21 July 2010

Boxscore

Norway	69–85	Belgium

Oberwart

21 July 2010

Boxscore

Great Britain	82–66	Slovakia

Güssing

21 July 2010

Boxscore

Poland	82–78	Austria

Oberwart

== 13th−17th place classification ==
=== Group G ===
Pos	Team	Pld	W	L	PF	PA	PD	Pts
13	Georgia	4	4	0	333	285	+48	8
14	Romania	4	2	2	300	303	−3	6
15	Denmark	4	2	2	299	277	+22	6
16	Switzerland	4	1	3	250	301	−51	5
17	Belarus	4	1	3	260	276	−16	5

Source: FIBA Archive

20 July 2010

Boxscore

Switzerland	62–88	Romania

Güssing

20 July 2010

Boxscore

Belarus	70–71	Denmark

Güssing

21 July 2010

Boxscore

Georgia	72–62	Belarus

Güssing

21 July 2010

Boxscore

Denmark	70–42	Switzerland

Güssing

22 July 2010

Boxscore

Romania	82–78	Denmark

Oberwart

22 July 2010

Boxscore

Switzerland	73–81	Georgia

Oberwart

23 July 2010

Boxscore

Belarus	62–73	Switzerland

Güssing

23 July 2010

Boxscore

Georgia	97–70	Romania

Güssing

24 July 2010

Boxscore

Denmark	80–83	Georgia

Güssing

== 9th−12th place playoffs ==
9th–12th place semifinals
E5	Finland	89
F6	Slovakia	61
F5	Norway	73
E6	Hungary	66

9th place match
E5	Finland	65
F5	Norway	54
11th place match
F6	Slovakia	85
E6	Hungary	88

=== 9th–12th place semifinals ===
23 July 2010

Boxscore

Finland	89–61	Slovakia

Güssing

23 July 2010

Boxscore

Norway	73–66	Hungary

Güssing

=== 11th place match ===
24 July 2010

Boxscore

Slovakia	85–88	Hungary

Güssing

=== 9th place match ===
24 July 2010

Boxscore

Finland	65–54	Norway

Güssing

== 5th−8th place playoffs ==
5th–8th place semifinals
E3	Israel	100
F4	Belgium	93
F3	Great Britain	91
E4	Portugal	66

5th place match
E3	Israel	103
F3	Great Britain	92
7th place match
F4	Belgium	61
E4	Portugal	64

=== 5th–8th place semifinals ===
23 July 2010

Boxscore

Israel	100–93	Belgium

Oberwart

23 July 2010

Boxscore

Great Britain	91–66	Portugal

Oberwart

=== 7th place match ===
24 July 2010

Boxscore

Belgium	61–64	Portugal

Oberwart

=== 5th place match ===
24 July 2010

Boxscore

Israel	103–92	Great Britain

Oberwart

== Championship playoffs ==
Semifinals
E1	Sweden	79
F2	Poland	69
F1	Austria	76
E2	Bulgaria	71

Final
E1	Sweden	66
F1	Austria	71
3rd place match
F2	Poland	86
E2	Bulgaria	76

=== Semifinals ===
23 July 2010

Boxscore

Sweden	79–69	Poland

Oberwart

23 July 2010

Boxscore

Austria	76–71	Bulgaria

Oberwart

=== 3rd place match ===
24 July 2010

Boxscore

Poland	86–76	Bulgaria

Oberwart

=== Final ===
24 July 2010

Boxscore

Sweden	66–71	Austria

Oberwart

== Final standings ==
Rank	Team
1st place, gold medalist(s)	Austria
2nd place, silver medalist(s)	Sweden
3rd place, bronze medalist(s)	Poland
4	Bulgaria
5	Israel
6	Great Britain
7	Portugal
8	Belgium
9	Finland
10	Norway
11	Hungary
12	Slovakia
13	Georgia
14	Romania
15	Denmark
16	Switzerland
17	Belarus

Promoted to the 2011 FIBA Europe Under-20 Championship Division A

== See also ==
- 2010 FIBA Europe Under-20 Championship (Division A)
