= Norway men's national under-20 basketball team =

Youth basketball team representing Norway

Norway
- FIBA zone: FIBA Europe
- National federation: Norwegian Basketball Association

U20 European Championship
- Appearances: None

U20 European Championship Division B
- Appearances: 4
- Medals: None

The Norway men's national under-20 basketball team is a national basketball team of Norway, administered by the Norwegian Basketball Association. It represents the country in men's international under-20 basketball competitions.

== FIBA U20 European Championship participations ==
Year	Result in Division B
2008	11th
2009	11th
2010	10th
2011	20th

== See also ==
- Norway men's national basketball team
- Norway men's national under-18 basketball team
