= FIBA U20 EuroBasket =

International men's juniors basketball tournament

- Current season, competition or edition: 2026 FIBA U20 EuroBasket
- Sport: Basketball
- Founded: 1992
- Divisions: 2
- No. of teams: 16 (Division A)
- Continent: Europe (FIBA Europe)
- Most recent champion: Slovenia (3rd title)
- Most titles: Serbia (Note: FR Yugoslavia and Serbia and Montenegro won 2 gold and 2 bronze medals.) (5 titles)
- Related competitions: FIBA U18 EuroBasket; FIBA U16 EuroBasket
- Website: www.fiba.basketball/history

The FIBA U20 EuroBasket, formerly the FIBA U20 European Championship, and originally the European Championship for Men '22 and Under', is an annual youth basketball competition contested by the under-20 men's national teams from FIBA Europe.

The inaugural tournament was in 1992, and was originally an under-22 aged competition from 1992 until 1998. The event was held biennially until 2004, and has been played every year since 2005.

The competition uses a promotion and relegation system to determine new qualifiers for each edition. The bottom three teams from Division A are relegated, while the top three teams from Division B are promoted.

The current champions are Slovenia, having beaten Serbia in the 2026 final.

== Division A ==
The Division A is the top level of the Under-20 championship organized by FIBA Europe.

These teams have always played in Division A, and have never been relegated to Division B:

- France
- Italy
- Lithuania
- Spain

=== Results ===
Year	Host	Gold medal game			Bronze medal game		
Year	Host	Gold	Score	Silver	Bronze	Score	Fourth place
1992	Greece (Athens)	Italy	65–63	Greece	France	63–60	Israel
1994	Slovenia (Maribor, Postojna & Ljubljana)	Belarus	96–91	Italy	Spain	83–69	Greece
1996	Turkey (Bursa & Istanbul)	Lithuania	85–81	Spain	FR Yugoslavia	67–62	Turkey
1998	Italy (Trapani)	FR Yugoslavia	92–73	Slovenia	Turkey	64–57	Spain
2000	Macedonia (Ohrid)	Slovenia	66–65	Israel	Spain	82–77	Croatia
2002	Lithuania (Kaunas, Alytus & Vilnius)	Greece	77–73	Spain	France	95–78	Russia
2004	Czech Republic (Brno)	Slovenia	66–61	Israel	Lithuania	92–63	Greece
2005	Russia (Chekhov)	Russia	61–53	Lithuania	Serbia & Montenegro	63–45	Israel
2006	Turkey (İzmir)	Serbia & Montenegro	64–58	Turkey	Slovenia	83–75	Italy
2007	Slovenia (Nova Gorica); Italy (Gorizia)	Serbia	87–78	Spain	Italy	74–63	Russia
2008	Latvia (Riga)	Serbia	96–89	Lithuania	Spain	91–72	Turkey
2009	Greece (Rhodes & Ialysos)	Greece	90–85	France	Spain	75–72	Italy
2010	Croatia (Zadar, Crikvenica & Makarska)	France	73–62	Greece	Spain	86–79	Croatia
2011	Spain (Bilbao)	Spain	82–70	Italy	France	66–50	Russia
2012	Slovenia (Ljubljana, Domžale & Kranjska Gora)	Lithuania	50–49	France	Spain	67–66	Serbia
2013	Estonia (Tallinn)	Italy	67–60	Latvia	Spain	70–63	Russia
2014	Greece (Heraklion & Rethymno)	Turkey	65–57	Spain	Serbia	79–66	Croatia
2015	Italy (Lignano Sabbiadoro & Latisana)	Serbia	70–64	Spain	Turkey	84–74	France
2016	Finland (Helsinki)	Spain	68–55	Lithuania	Turkey	76–61	Germany
2017	Greece (Heraklion, Rethymno & Chania)	Greece	65–56	Israel	France	72–58	Spain
2018	Germany (Chemnitz)	Israel	80–66	Croatia	Germany	81–70	France
2019	Israel (Tel Aviv)	Israel	92–84	Spain	Germany	73–65	France
2020	Lithuania	Cancelled due to COVID-19 pandemic in Lithuania.					
2021	Montenegro	Cancelled due to COVID-19 pandemic in Europe. The 2021 FIBA U20 European Challengers were played instead.					
2022	Montenegro (Podgorica)	Spain	69–61	Lithuania	Montenegro	86–77	Israel
2023	Greece (Heraklion)	France	89–79*	Israel	Greece	68–64	Belgium
2024	Poland (Gdynia)	France	82–78	Slovenia	Greece	70–68	Belgium
2025	Greece (Heraklion)	Italy	83–66	Lithuania	France	73–62	Serbia
2026	Slovenia (Ljubljana)	Slovenia	84–65	Serbia	Spain	65–54	France

=== Medal table ===
Rank	Nation	Gold	Silver	Bronze	Total
1	Serbia	5	1	3	9
2	Spain	3	6	8	17
3	France	3	2	5	10
4	Greece	3	2	2	7
5	Italy	3	2	1	6
5	Slovenia	3	2	1	6
7	Lithuania	2	5	1	8
8	Israel	2	4	0	6
9	Turkey	1	1	3	5
10	Belarus	1	0	0	1
10	Russia	1	0	0	1
12	Croatia	0	1	0	1
12	Latvia	0	1	0	1
14	Germany	0	0	2	2
15	Montenegro	0	0	1	1
Totals (15 entries)		27	27	27	81

=== Participation details ===
==== Tournaments 1992–2012 ====
Team	(Greece) 1992	(Slovenia) 1994	(Turkey) 1996	(Italy) 1998	(North Macedonia) 2000	(Lithuania) 2002	(Czech Republic) 2004	(Russia) 2005	(Turkey) 2006	(Italy) (Slovenia) 2007	(Latvia) 2008	(Greece) 2009	(Croatia) 2010	(Spain) 2011	(Slovenia) 2012
Austria														15th	
Belarus		1st	10th				9th	14th	16th						
Belgium	8th		12th									16th			
Bulgaria									9th	8th	15th				
Croatia				9th	4th	8th	12th	11th	5th	10th	12th	8th	4th	16th	
Czech Republic					12th		8th	16th					16th		
Estonia															15th
Finland		10th													
France	3rd	11th	11th	5th	8th	3rd		6th	6th	9th	7th	2nd	1st	3rd	2nd
Georgia										12th	16th				16th
Germany	12th	9th		7th				13th	15th			14th	14th	5th	5th
Greece	2nd	4th	6th	11th	7th	1st	4th	5th	8th	13th	13th	1st	2nd	12th	8th
Hungary									14th	16th					
Israel	4th	5th	9th	10th	2nd	10th	2nd	4th	12th	6th	10th	15th			
Italy	1st	2nd	5th	6th		11th		8th	4th	3rd	6th	4th	10th	2nd	10th
Latvia				12th			7th	7th	13th	14th	11th	10th	11th	8th	6th
Lithuania			1st	8th	10th	5th	3rd	2nd	7th	11th	2nd	5th	9th	14th	1st
Montenegro			played as part of (Serbia and Montenegro)								5th	7th	6th	7th	14th
Netherlands													15th		
North Macedonia					11th					15th					
Poland	11th														
Romania	9th														
Russia		7th	8th		9th	4th	6th	1st	10th	4th	9th	9th	5th	4th	11th
Serbia			played as part of (Serbia and Montenegro)							1st	1st	11th	7th	13th	4th
Slovakia		12th													
Slovenia		8th	7th	2nd	1st	6th	1st	10th	3rd	5th	14th	13th	12th	11th	7th
Spain	6th	3rd	2nd	4th	3rd	2nd	11th	9th	11th	2nd	3rd	3rd	3rd	1st	3rd
Sweden														9th	13th
Turkey	10th	6th	4th	3rd	6th	9th		12th	2nd	7th	4th	6th	13th	6th	9th
Ukraine						12th	10th	15th			8th	12th	8th	10th	12th
Team	(Greece) 1992	(Slovenia) 1994	(Turkey) 1996	(Italy) 1998	(North Macedonia) 2000	(Lithuania) 2002	(Czech Republic) 2004	(Russia) 2005	(Turkey) 2006	(Italy) (Slovenia) 2007	(Latvia) 2008	(Greece) 2009	(Croatia) 2010	(Spain) 2011	(Slovenia) 2012
CIS	7th	defunct													
Czechoslovakia	5th	defunct													
Serbia and Montenegro †^{A}			3rd	1st	5th	7th	5th	3rd	1st	defunct					

==== Tournaments 2013–present ====
Team	(Estonia) 2013	(Greece) 2014	(Italy) 2015	(Finland) 2016	(Greece) 2017	(Germany) 2018	(Israel) 2019	(Montenegro) 2022	(Greece) 2023	(Poland) 2024	(Greece) 2025	(Slovenia) 2026	Total
Belgium			8th	14th				8th	4th	4th	12th	15th	10
Bosnia and Herzegovina			19th										1
Bulgaria	14th	15th	20th										6
Croatia	12th	4th	17th			2nd	7th	7th	14th			7th	19
Czech Republic	17th	17th	6th	7th	15th			15th		6th	9th	14th	13
Estonia	19th								16th				3
Finland				15th							15th		3
France	9th	8th	4th	13th	3rd	4th	4th	5th	1st	1st	3rd	4th	26
Georgia	20th												4
Germany	11th	14th	11th	4th	7th	3rd	3rd	11th	6th	12th	13th	8th	21
Great Britain		11th	15th			10th	8th						4
Greece	5th	6th	18th		1st	13th	9th	12th	3rd	3rd	5th	5th	26
Hungary		20th		16th									4
Iceland					8th	15th			12th	13th	14th		5
Israel	15th	7th	10th	12th	2nd	1st	1st	4th	2nd	10th	6th	10th	24
Italy	1st	10th	9th	5th	13th	8th	13th	9th	9th	9th	1st	13th	25
Latvia	2nd	16th	5th	6th	16th		16th					12th	17
Lithuania	7th	5th	7th	2nd	6th	9th	5th	2nd	8th	5th	2nd	9th	25
Montenegro	8th	18th			11th	11th	12th	3rd	13th	16th			13
North Macedonia										15th			3
Poland		9th	14th				14th	13th	15th	8th	10th	11th	9
Portugal								14th					1
Romania						16th					11th	16th	4
Russia	4th	13th	16th										16
Serbia	13th	3rd	1st	11th	5th	6th	15th		5th	11th	4th	2nd	17
Slovenia	10th	12th	13th	9th	14th		11th	10th	11th	2nd	7th	1st	25
Spain	3rd	2nd	2nd	1st	4th	7th	2nd	1st	10th	7th	8th	3rd	27
Sweden	16th	19th		10th	12th	14th							7
Turkey	6th	1st	3rd	3rd	9th	5th	6th	6th	7th	14th		6th	25
Ukraine	18th		12th	8th	10th	12th	10th	16th			16th		16
Team	(Estonia) 2013	(Greece) 2014	(Italy) 2015	(Finland) 2016	(Greece) 2017	(Germany) 2018	(Israel) 2019	(Montenegro) 2022	(Greece) 2023	(Poland) 2024	(Greece) 2025	(Slovenia) 2026	Total
Austria	playing in lower divisions												1
Belarus	playing in lower divisions												5
Netherlands	playing in lower divisions												1
Slovakia	playing in lower divisions												1
CIS †	defunct												1
Czechoslovakia †	defunct												1
Serbia and Montenegro †^{A}	defunct												7

^{^A} As FR Yugoslavia (1996–2002, 4 participations, 2 medals) and as Serbia and Montenegro (2004–2006, 3 participations, 2 medals)

=== MVP Awards (since 1996) ===
Year	MVP Award Winner
1996	(Slovenia) Rasho Nesterović
1998	(Serbia and Montenegro) Igor Rakočević
2000	(Slovenia) Sani Bečirovič
2002	(Greece) Nikos Zisis
2004	(Slovenia) Erazem Lorbek
2005	(Russia) Nikita Kurbanov
2006	(Turkey) Ersan İlyasova
2007	(Serbia) Miloš Teodosić
2008	(Serbia) Miroslav Raduljica
2009	(Greece) Kostas Papanikolaou
2010	(France) Andrew Albicy
2011	(Spain) Nikola Mirotić
2012	(France) Léo Westermann
2013	(Italy) Amedeo Della Valle
2014	(Turkey) Cedi Osman
2015	(Serbia) Marko Gudurić
2016	(Spain) Marc García
2017	(Greece) Vassilis Charalampopoulos
2018	(Israel) Yovel Zoosman
2019	(Israel) Deni Avdija
2022	(Spain) Juan Núñez
2023	(France) Ilias Kamardine
2024	(France) Zacharie Perrin
2025	(Italy) Francesco Ferrari
2026	(Slovenia) Mark Padjen

=== Statistical leaders ===
Top scorers

Year	Top scorer	PPG
1996	(Turkey) İbrahim Kutluay	22.3
1998	(Federal Republic of Yugoslavia) Igor Rakočević	21.1
2000	(North Macedonia) Vlado Ilievski	23.0
2002	(Croatia) Marko Popović	25.0
2004	(Greece) Kostas Vasileiadis	25.5
2005	(Croatia) Damir Markota	18.3
2006	(Latvia) Ernests Kalve	20.5
2007	(Latvia) Ronalds Zaķis	24.7
2008	(Montenegro) Vladimir Dašić	22.8
2009	(Germany) Robin Benzing	22.2
2010	(Greece) Nikos Pappas	22.1
2011	(Spain) Nikola Mirotić	27.0
2012	(Montenegro) Marko Mugoša	18.0
2013	(Spain) Dani Díez	18.7
2014	(Bulgaria) Sasha Vezenkov	19.3
2015	(Belgium) Emmanuel Lecomte	19.6
2016	(Finland) Lauri Markkanen	24.9
2017	(Ukraine) Sviatoslav Mykhailiuk	20.4
2018	(Sweden) Elijah Clarance	22.4
2019	(Greece) Georgios Kalaitzakis	19.7
2022	(Lithuania) Mantas Rubštavičius	19.7
2023	(Iceland) Orri Gunnarsson	18.3
2024	(Czech Republic) Jakub Necas	18,6
2025	(Slovenia) Jan Vide	17,9
2026	(Czech Republic) Lukas Smazak	17,1

Assist leaders

Year	Top Assist Leaders	APG
1996	(Belarus) Dzmitry Kuzmin	6.0
1998	(Lithuania) Kęstutis Marčiulionis	2.3
2000	(Slovenia) Sani Bečirovič	3.3
2002	(Croatia) Marko Popović	7.1
2004	(Spain) Víctor Sada	4.3
2005	(Slovenia) Jure Močnik	5
2006	(Latvia) Edgars Jeromanovs	6.3
2007	(Serbia) Miloš Teodosić	5.4
2008	(Spain) Quino Colom	6.1
2009	(Russia) Dmitry Khvostov	6.1
2010	(France) Andrew Albicy	5.9
2011	(Spain) Josep Franch	5.1
2012	(Ukraine) Klym Artamonov	5.3
2013	(Ukraine) Klym Artamonov	6.2
2014	(Slovenia) Matic Rebec	9.0
2015	(Czech Republic) Radovan Kouřil	5.5
2016	(Slovenia) Žan Mark Šiško	7.1
2017	(Israel) Tamir Blatt	10.1
2018	(Spain) Pol Figueras	6.4
2019	(Israel) Yam Madar	7.7
2022	(Croatia) Vito Kučić	6.4
2023	(Israel) Noam Yaacov	7.6
2024	(Israel) Noam Yaacov	7,2
2025	(Greece) Neoklis Avdalas	8,0
2026	(Spain) Raúl Villar	7,0

Top rebounders

Year	Top Rebounder	RPG
1996	(Slovenia) Rasho Nesterović	9.6
1998	(Italy) Samuele Podestà	9.6
2000	(Croatia) Andrija Žižić	10.3
2002	(Federal Republic of Yugoslavia) Nenad Krstić	11.3
2004	(Lithuania) Paulius Jankūnas	12.1
2005	(Croatia) Damir Markota	10.8
2006	(Spain) Carlos Suárez	10.4
2007	(Lithuania) Povilas Butkevičius	11.7
2008	(Serbia) Miroslav Raduljica	10.9
2009	(Montenegro) Nikola Vučević	10.8
2010	(Turkey) Furkan Aldemir	11.6
2011	(Turkey) Furkan Aldemir	15.9
2012	(Ukraine) Vyacheslav Bobrov	8.9
2013	(Slovenia) Tomaž Bolčina	9.7
2014	(Bulgaria) Sasha Vezenkov	11.2
2015	(Lithuania) Domantas Sabonis	13.2
2016	(Lithuania) Regimantas Miniotas	9.3
2017	(Sweden) Simon Birgander	13.8
2018	(Montenegro) Miloš Popović	11.4
2019	(Montenegro) Marko Simonović	11.4
2022	(Turkey) Adem Bona	10.9
2023	(Israel) Daniel Wolf	12.0
2024	(Belgium) Nathan Missia-Dio	10,6
2025	(Spain) Alvaro Folgueiras	9,7
2026	(Lithuania) Mantas Juzėnas	10,3

== Division B ==
Division B is the lower tier of the two Under-20 championships organized by FIBA Europe.

=== Results ===
Year	Host	Promoted to Division A			Bronze medal game		
Year	Host	Gold	Score	Silver	Bronze *	Score	Fourth place
2005 details	Bulgaria (Varna)	Bulgaria	86–80	Hungary	Poland	96–76	Georgia
2006 details	Portugal (Lisbon)	Georgia	96–88	Macedonia	Finland	91–75	Poland
2007 details	Poland (Warsaw)	Montenegro	89–68	Ukraine	Finland	76–73	Germany
2008 details	Romania (Târgu Mureș)	Germany	110–102	Belgium	Sweden	80–71	Estonia
2009 details	Macedonia (Skopje)	Netherlands	88–77	Czech Republic	Poland	96–66	Sweden
2010 details	Austria (Oberwart & Güssing)	Austria	71–66	Sweden	Poland	86–76	Bulgaria
2011 details	Bosnia and Herzegovina (Sarajevo)	Georgia	79–70	Estonia	Czech Republic	86–85	Belgium
2012 details	Bulgaria (Sofia)	Croatia	88–80	Czech Republic	Israel	101–67	Bulgaria
2013 details	Romania (Pitești)	Poland	83–71	Great Britain	Hungary	70–69	Belgium
2014 details	Bosnia and Herzegovina (Sarajevo)	Bosnia and Herzegovina	76–70	Belgium	Ukraine	77–62	Belarus
2015 details	Hungary (Székesfehérvár)	Finland	80–76	Sweden	Hungary	68–66	Montenegro
2016 details	Greece (Chalkida)	Montenegro	78–76	Iceland	Greece	73–67	Croatia
2017 details	Romania (Oradea)	Romania	80–67	Croatia	Great Britain	81–65	Russia
2018 details	Bulgaria (Sofia)	Poland	71–60	Slovenia	Latvia	76–62	Russia
2019 details	Portugal (Matosinhos)	Portugal	73–57	Czech Republic	Belgium	88–80	Russia
2020	Georgia	Cancelled due to COVID-19 pandemic in Georgia.					
2021	Georgia	Cancelled due to COVID-19 pandemic in Europe. The 2021 FIBA U20 European Challengers were played instead.					
2022 details	Georgia (Tbilisi)	Serbia	81–67	Iceland	Estonia	63–53	Finland
2023 details	North Macedonia (Skopje)	Czech Republic	85–72	North Macedonia	Ukraine	83–61	Sweden
2024 details	Romania (Pitești)	Romania	80–58	Ukraine	Finland	73–56	Netherlands
2025 details	Armenia (Yerevan)	Latvia	74–64	Croatia	Turkey	86–54	Switzerland
2026 details	Slovakia (Bratislava)	Ukraine	74–64	Iceland	Sweden	75–68	Portugal

- Until 2011, the top two teams in Division B were promoted to the next year's Division A.
- In 2012, the top four teams in Division B were promoted to the 2013 Division A.
- Since 2013, the top three teams in Division B are promoted to Division A for the next tournament.

=== Medal table ===
Rank	Nation	Gold	Silver	Bronze	Total
1	Poland	2	0	3	5
2	Georgia	2	0	0	2
2	Montenegro	2	0	0	2
2	Romania	2	0	0	2
5	Czech Republic	1	3	1	5
6	Ukraine	1	2	2	5
7	Croatia	1	2	0	3
8	Finland	1	0	3	4
9	Latvia	1	0	1	2
10	Austria	1	0	0	1
10	Bosnia and Herzegovina	1	0	0	1
10	Bulgaria	1	0	0	1
10	Germany	1	0	0	1
10	Netherlands	1	0	0	1
10	Portugal	1	0	0	1
10	Serbia	1	0	0	1
17	Iceland	0	3	0	3
18	Sweden	0	2	2	4
19	Belgium	0	2	1	3
20	North Macedonia	0	2	0	2
21	Hungary	0	1	2	3
22	Estonia	0	1	1	2
22	Great Britain	0	1	1	2
24	Slovenia	0	1	0	1
25	Greece	0	0	1	1
25	Israel	0	0	1	1
25	Turkey	0	0	1	1
Totals (27 entries)		20	20	20	60

=== Participation details ===
Team	(Bulgaria) 2005	(Portugal) 2006	(Poland) 2007	(Romania) 2008	(North Macedonia) 2009	(Austria) 2010	(Bosnia and Herzegovina) 2011	(Bulgaria) 2012	(Romania) 2013	(Bosnia and Herzegovina) 2014	(Hungary) 2015	(Greece) 2016	(Romania) 2017	(Bulgaria) 2018	(Portugal) 2019	(Georgia (country)) 2022	(North Macedonia) 2023	(Romania) 2024	(Armenia) 2025	(Slovakia) 2026	Total
Albania	11th										16th	21st	14th	16th	12th	15th	19th	18th	21st	21st	11
Armenia											12th	17th	17th	21st	21st			19th	16th	20th	8
Austria		8th	12th	10th	5th	1st		10th		11th	15th					17th	12th		15th		11
Azerbaijan				19th									19th	20th			20th	20th		11th	6
Belarus			18th			17th	17th	13th		4th	5th	13th	15th	11th	13th						10
Belgium	5th	6th	10th	2nd		8th	4th	7th	4th	2nd			6th	8th	3rd						12
Bosnia and Herzegovina							6th			1st		5th								10th	4
Bulgaria	1st				9th	4th	8th	4th				18th		7th	5th	7th	10th	9th	13th	7th	13
Croatia								1st				4th	2nd					10th	2nd		5
Cyprus									11th	8th										14th	3
Czech Republic		5th	13th	9th	2nd		3rd	2nd						6th	2nd		1st				9
Denmark						15th	7th	11th											14th	16th	5
Estonia			6th	4th			2nd			12th		19th		14th	10th	3rd		11th	19th	17th	11
Finland	8th	3rd	3rd	18th	7th	9th	10th	8th	10th	7th	1st		9th	5th	11th	4th	9th	3rd			17
Georgia	4th	1st			8th	13th	1st			10th	11th	8th	7th	13th	8th	11th	14th	5th	20th	15th	16
Germany			4th	1st																	2
Great Britain		14th	8th	15th	13th	6th	13th	6th	2nd			7th	3rd				8th	12th	6th		13
Greece												3rd									1
Hungary	2nd			12th	14th	11th	18th	18th	3rd		3rd		11th	10th	14th	10th	15th	6th	11th	8th	16
Iceland	12th	12th					14th					2nd			7th	2nd				2nd	7
Ireland	10th	16th	11th	16th								12th	18th		20th	9th	16th	14th	7th	5th	12
Israel						5th	11th	3rd													3
Kosovo											14th	20th	12th	18th	18th	12th	11th	16th	8th	18th	10
Latvia														3rd		6th	13th	13th	1st		5
Luxembourg					16th		22nd	17th	12th	13th	8th			19th	19th	18th	17th			6th	11
Malta													20th								1
Moldova											18th		21st	22nd				21st			4
Montenegro			1st								4th	1st							12th		4
Netherlands		9th	14th	7th	1st		16th	14th	8th	5th	6th	15th	10th	15th	6th	13th	5th	4th	5th	12th	18
North Macedonia		2nd		8th	6th		19th	16th			7th	14th	13th	12th	16th	8th	2nd		17th	9th	14
Norway				11th	11th	10th	20th														4
Poland	3rd	4th	5th	13th	3rd	3rd	9th	5th	1st			6th	5th	1st							12
Portugal	9th	10th	15th	6th	15th	7th	5th	9th	5th	6th	9th	11th	8th	9th	1st		6th	7th	10th	4th	19
Romania			17th	5th	17th	14th	15th		7th	9th	17th	10th	1st		17th	16th		1st			13
Russia												9th	4th	4th	4th						4
Serbia																1st					1
Slovakia	6th	13th	7th	14th	10th	12th	12th	12th	9th		10th	16th	16th	17th	15th	19th	18th	8th	18th	19th	19
Slovenia														2nd							1
Sweden	7th	11th	9th	3rd	4th	2nd					2nd				9th	5th	4th	15th	9th	3rd	13
Switzerland		15th	16th	17th	12th	16th	21st	15th	6th	14th	13th					14th	7th	17th	4th	13th	15
Turkey																			3rd		1
Ukraine		7th	2nd							3rd							3rd	2nd		1st	6
Team	(Bulgaria) 2005	(Portugal) 2006	(Poland) 2007	(Romania) 2008	(North Macedonia) 2009	(Austria) 2010	(Bosnia and Herzegovina) 2011	(Bulgaria) 2012	(Romania) 2013	(Bosnia and Herzegovina) 2014	(Hungary) 2015	(Greece) 2016	(Romania) 2017	(Bulgaria) 2018	(Portugal) 2019	(Georgia (country)) 2022	(North Macedonia) 2023	(Romania) 2024	(Armenia) 2025	(Slovakia) 2026	Total

== See also ==
- FIBA U16 European Championship
- FIBA U18 European Championship
