= 2022 FIBA U20 European Championship Division B =

Tournament details
- Host country: Georgia
- City: Tbilisi
- Dates: 15–24 July 2022
- Teams: 19 (from 1 confederation)

Final positions
- Champions: Serbia (1st title)
- Runners-up: Iceland
- Third place: Estonia

Tournament statistics
- Games played: 63
- MVP: (Serbia) Mihailo Bošković
- Top scorer: (Netherlands) Yannick Kraag (19 ppg)

Official website
- www.fiba.basketball

The 2022 FIBA U20 European Championship Division B was the 16th edition of the Division B of the European basketball championship for national under-20 teams. It was played from 15 to 24 July 2022 in Tbilisi, Georgia. Serbia men's national under-20 basketball team won the tournament.

== Participating teams ==
- Albania
- Austria
- Bulgaria
- Estonia
- Finland
- Georgia
- Hungary
- Iceland
- Ireland
- Kosovo
- Latvia ▼ (16th place, 2019 FIBA U20 European Championship Division A)
- Luxembourg
- Netherlands
- North Macedonia
- Romania
- Serbia ▼ (15th place, 2019 FIBA U20 European Championship Division A)
- Slovakia
- Sweden
- Switzerland

== First round ==
The draw of the first round was held on 15 February 2022 in Freising, Germany.

In the first round, the teams were drawn into four groups. The first two teams from each group advance to the quarterfinals; the third and fourth teams advance to the 9th–16th place playoffs; the other teams will play in the 17th–19th place classification group.

=== Group A ===
Pos	Team	Pld	W	L	PF	PA	PD	Pts	Qualification
1	Estonia	4	4	0	361	241	+120	8	Quarterfinals
2	Iceland	4	3	1	351	283	+68	7	Quarterfinals
3	Romania	4	2	2	280	343	−63	6	9th−16th place playoffs
4	Netherlands	4	1	3	305	275	+30	5	9th−16th place playoffs
5	Luxembourg	4	0	4	212	367	−155	4	17th−19th place classification

Source: FIBA

15 July 2022
14:30

Boxscore

Iceland	83–85	Estonia

Tbilisi Arena

15 July 2022
16:45

Boxscore

Luxembourg	42–92	Netherlands

Tbilisi Arena

16 July 2022
14:30

Boxscore

Romania	83–67	Luxembourg

Tbilisi Olympic Palace

16 July 2022
19:00

Boxscore

Netherlands	76–78	Iceland

Tbilisi Olympic Palace

17 July 2022
14:30

Boxscore

Estonia	73–62	Netherlands

Tbilisi Arena

17 July 2022
21:15

Boxscore

Iceland	93–67	Romania

Tbilisi Olympic Palace

19 July 2022
14:30

Boxscore

Luxembourg	55–97	Iceland

Tbilisi Olympic Palace

19 July 2022
16:45

Boxscore

Romania	48–108	Estonia

Tbilisi Olympic Palace

20 July 2022
14:30

Boxscore

Netherlands	75–82	Romania

Tbilisi Arena

20 July 2022
16:45

Boxscore

Estonia	95–48	Luxembourg

Tbilisi Arena

=== Group B ===
Pos	Team	Pld	W	L	PF	PA	PD	Pts	Qualification
1	Sweden	4	4	0	323	298	+25	8	Quarterfinals
2	North Macedonia	4	3	1	341	286	+55	7	Quarterfinals
3	Georgia	4	2	2	313	277	+36	6	9th−16th place playoffs
4	Kosovo	4	1	3	274	330	−56	5	9th−16th place playoffs
5	Austria	4	0	4	263	323	−60	4	17th−19th place classification

Source: FIBA

15 July 2022
19:00

Boxscore

Sweden	81–69	Kosovo

Tbilisi Arena

15 July 2022
21:15

Boxscore

Austria	54–90	North Macedonia

Tbilisi Arena

16 July 2022
16:45

Boxscore

North Macedonia	90–92	Sweden

Tbilisi Olympic Palace

16 July 2022
19:00

Boxscore

Georgia	81–65	Austria

Tbilisi Arena

17 July 2022
14:30

Boxscore

Kosovo	67–85	North Macedonia

Tbilisi Olympic Palace

17 July 2022
19:00

Boxscore

Sweden	77–67	Georgia

Tbilisi Arena

19 July 2022
19:00

Boxscore

Georgia	92–58	Kosovo

Tbilisi Arena

19 July 2022
19:00

Boxscore

Austria	72–73	Sweden

Tbilisi Olympic Palace

20 July 2022
19:00

Boxscore

North Macedonia	76–73	Georgia

Tbilisi Arena

20 July 2022
21:15

Boxscore

Kosovo	79–72	Austria

Tbilisi Arena

=== Group C ===
Pos	Team	Pld	W	L	PF	PA	PD	Pts	Qualification
1	Bulgaria	3	2	1	217	193	+24	5	Quarterfinals
2	Latvia	3	2	1	198	189	+9	5	Quarterfinals
3	Ireland	3	2	1	201	209	−8	5	9th−16th place playoffs
4	Hungary	3	0	3	177	202	−25	3	9th−16th place playoffs

Source: FIBA

15 July 2022
14:30

Boxscore

Latvia	64–72	Bulgaria

Tbilisi Olympic Palace

15 July 2022
21:15

Boxscore

Hungary	65–67	Ireland

Tbilisi Olympic Palace

17 July 2022
16:45

Boxscore

Bulgaria	73–54	Hungary

Tbilisi Arena

17 July 2022
21:15

Boxscore

Ireland	59–72	Latvia

Tbilisi Arena

20 July 2022
14:30

Boxscore

Latvia	62–58	Hungary

Tbilisi Olympic Palace

20 July 2022
16:45

Boxscore

Ireland	75–72	Bulgaria

Tbilisi Olympic Palace

=== Group D ===
Pos	Team	Pld	W	L	PF	PA	PD	Pts	Qualification
1	Serbia	4	4	0	393	247	+146	8	Quarterfinals
2	Finland	4	3	1	301	236	+65	7	Quarterfinals
3	Switzerland	4	2	2	267	272	−5	6	9th−16th place playoffs
4	Albania	4	1	3	206	313	−107	5	9th−16th place playoffs
5	Slovakia	4	0	4	230	329	−99	4	17th−19th place classification

Source: FIBA

15 July 2022
16:45

Boxscore

Switzerland	67–50	Albania

Tbilisi Olympic Palace

15 July 2022
19:00

Boxscore

Serbia	112–63	Slovakia

Tbilisi Olympic Palace

16 July 2022
14:30

Boxscore

Albania	48–116	Serbia

Tbilisi Arena

16 July 2022
16:45

Boxscore

Finland	71–55	Switzerland

Tbilisi Arena

17 July 2022
16:45

Boxscore

Slovakia	53–55	Albania

Tbilisi Olympic Palace

17 July 2022
19:00

Boxscore

Serbia	74–68	Finland

Tbilisi Olympic Palace

19 July 2022
14:30

Boxscore

Switzerland	68–91	Serbia

Tbilisi Arena

19 July 2022
16:45

Boxscore

Finland	85–54	Slovakia

Tbilisi Arena

20 July 2022
19:00

Boxscore

Albania	53–77	Finland

Tbilisi Olympic Palace

20 July 2022
21:15

Boxscore

Slovakia	60–77	Switzerland

Tbilisi Olympic Palace

== 17th−19th place classification ==
=== Group E ===
Pos	Team	Pld	W	L	PF	PA	PD	Pts
17	Austria	2	2	0	153	116	+37	4
18	Luxembourg	2	1	1	144	137	+7	3
19	Slovakia	2	0	2	106	150	−44	2

Source: FIBA

22 July 2022
12:15

Boxscore

Luxembourg	70–77	Austria

Tbilisi Olympic Palace

23 July 2022
12:15

Boxscore

Austria	76–46	Slovakia

Tbilisi Olympic Palace

24 July 2022
10:00

Boxscore

Slovakia	60–74	Luxembourg

Tbilisi Olympic Palace

== 9th−16th place playoffs ==
13th place match
D3	Switzerland	76
A4	Netherlands	80
15th place match
A3	Romania	81
D4	Albania	98

13th–16th place semifinals
A3	Romania	62
D3	Switzerland	70
A4	Netherlands	77
D4	Albania	62

9th–16th place quarterfinals
A3	Romania	79
B4	Kosovo	82
D3	Switzerland	48
C4	Hungary	81
B3	Georgia	67
A4	Netherlands	53
C3	Ireland	76
D4	Albania	60

9th–12th place semifinals
B4	Kosovo	62
C4	Hungary	82
B3	Georgia	52
C3	Ireland	75

9th place match
C4	Hungary	55
C3	Ireland	66
11th place match
B4	Kosovo	79
B3	Georgia	116

=== 9th–16th place quarterfinals ===
22 July 2022
14:30

Boxscore

Romania	79–82	Kosovo

Tbilisi Olympic Palace

22 July 2022
16:45

Boxscore

Switzerland	48–81	Hungary

Tbilisi Olympic Palace

22 July 2022
19:00

Boxscore

Georgia	67–53	Netherlands

Tbilisi Olympic Palace

22 July 2022
21:15

Boxscore

Ireland	76–60	Albania

Tbilisi Olympic Palace

=== 13th–16th place semifinals ===
23 July 2022
14:30

Boxscore

Romania	62–70	Switzerland

Tbilisi Olympic Palace

23 July 2022
16:45

Boxscore

Netherlands	77–62	Albania

Tbilisi Olympic Palace

=== 9th–12th place semifinals ===
23 July 2022
19:00

Boxscore

Kosovo	62–82	Hungary

Tbilisi Olympic Palace

23 July 2022
21:15

Boxscore

Georgia	52–75	Ireland

Tbilisi Olympic Palace

=== 15th place match ===
24 July 2022
12:15

Boxscore

Romania	81–98	Albania

Tbilisi Olympic Palace

=== 13th place match ===
24 July 2022
14:30

Boxscore

Switzerland	76–80	Netherlands

Tbilisi Olympic Palace

=== 11th place match ===
24 July 2022
16:45

Boxscore

Kosovo	79–116	Georgia

Tbilisi Olympic Palace

=== 9th place match ===
24 July 2022
19:00

Boxscore

Hungary	55–66	Ireland

Tbilisi Olympic Palace

== Championship playoffs ==
5th place match
C2	Latvia	66
B1	Sweden	80
7th place match
B2	North Macedonia	64
C1	Bulgaria	69

5th–8th place semifinals
B2	North Macedonia	62
C2	Latvia	85
B1	Sweden	73
C1	Bulgaria	67

Quarterfinals
A1	Estonia	81
B2	North Macedonia	59
D1	Serbia	79
C2	Latvia	76
B1	Sweden	71
A2	Iceland	77
C1	Bulgaria	64
D2	Finland	67

Semifinals
A1	Estonia	58
D1	Serbia	73
A2	Iceland	94
D2	Finland	77

Final
D1	Serbia	81
A2	Iceland	67
3rd place match
A1	Estonia	63
D2	Finland	53

=== Quarterfinals ===
22 July 2022
14:30

Boxscore

Estonia	81–59	North Macedonia

Tbilisi Arena

22 July 2022
16:45

Boxscore

Serbia	79–76	Latvia

Tbilisi Arena

22 July 2022
19:00

Boxscore

Sweden	71–77	Iceland

Tbilisi Arena

22 July 2022
21:15

Boxscore

Bulgaria	64–67	Finland

Tbilisi Arena

=== 5th–8th place semifinals ===
23 July 2022
14:30

Boxscore

North Macedonia	62–85	Latvia

Tbilisi Arena

23 July 2022
16:45

Boxscore

Sweden	73–67	Bulgaria

Tbilisi Arena

=== Semifinals ===
23 July 2022
19:00

Boxscore

Estonia	58–73	Serbia

Tbilisi Arena

23 July 2022
21:15

Boxscore

Iceland	94–77	Finland

Tbilisi Arena

=== 7th place match ===
24 July 2022
14:30

Boxscore

North Macedonia	64–69	Bulgaria

Tbilisi Arena

=== 5th place match ===
24 July 2022
16:45

Boxscore

Latvia	66–80	Sweden

Tbilisi Arena

=== 3rd place match ===
24 July 2022
19:00

Boxscore

Estonia	63–53	Finland

Tbilisi Arena

=== Final ===
24 July 2022
21:15

Boxscore

Serbia	81–67	Iceland
Scoring by quarter: 23–16, 16–22, 17–12, 25–17
Pts: Paunović 17; Rebs: Bošković, Paunović 11; Asts: Kovačević 7		Pts: Árnason 19; Rebs: Gunnlaugsson 5 Asts: Svalason 5

Tbilisi Arena, Tbilisi
Referees: Fernando Calatrava (ESP), Mihkel Männiste (EST), Kirile Tvauri (GEO)

== Final standings ==
Rank	Team	Record
1st place, gold medalist(s)	Serbia	7–0
2nd place, silver medalist(s)	Iceland	5–2
3rd place, bronze medalist(s)	Estonia	6–1
4	Finland	4–3
5	Sweden	6–1
6	Latvia	3–3
7	Bulgaria	3–3
8	North Macedonia	3–4
9	Ireland	5–1
10	Hungary	2–4
11	Georgia	4–3
12	Kosovo	2–5
13	Netherlands	3–4
14	Switzerland	3–4
15	Albania	2–5
16	Romania	2–5
17	Austria	2–4
18	Luxembourg	1–5
19	Slovakia	0–6

Promoted to the 2023 FIBA U20 European Championship Division A

== See also ==
- 2022 FIBA U20 European Championship Division A
