= 2007 FIBA Europe Under-20 Championship Division B =

3rd Division B Championship

Tournament details
- Host country: Poland
- Dates: July 6–15
- Teams: 18 (from 48 federations)
- Venue: 1 (in 1 host city)

Final positions
- Champions: Montenegro (1st title)

Tournament statistics
- Top scorer: (Romania) Nicoară (20.9)
- Top rebounds: (Romania) Nicoară (12.4)
- Top assists: (Austria) Schreiner (5.6)
- PPG (Team): Ukraine (87.0)
- RPG (Team): Poland (43.5)
- APG (Team): Montenegro (18.0)

Official website
- www.fibaeurope.com

The 2007 FIBA Europe Under-20 Championship Division B was the third edition of the Division B of the FIBA Europe Under-20 Championship, the second-tier level of European Under-20 basketball. The city of Warsaw, in Poland, hosted the tournament. Montenegro won their first title.

Montenegro and Ukraine were promoted to Division A.

== Teams ==
- Austria
- Belarus
- Belgium
- Czech Republic
- Estonia
- Finland
- Germany
- Great Britain
- Ireland
- Montenegro
- Netherlands
- Poland
- Portugal
- Romania
- Slovakia
- Sweden
- Switzerland
- Ukraine

== Preliminary round ==
The eighteen teams were allocated in four groups (two groups of five teams and two groups of four). The two top teams of each group advanced to the qualifying round. The last three teams of each group advanced to the classification round.

Team advanced to Qualifying round
Team competed in Classification round

=== Group A ===
Team	Pld	W	L	PF	PA	Pts
Montenegro	4	3	1	339	294	7
Germany	4	3	1	289	273	7
Austria	4	2	2	290	299	6
Sweden	4	1	3	267	280	5
Czech Republic	4	1	3	254	293	5

6 July 2007
Germany	74–76	Montenegro	Warsaw
Sweden	62–45	Czech Republic	Warsaw
7 July 2007
Austria	78–75	Sweden	Warsaw
Czech Republic	73–79	Germany	Warsaw
8 July 2007
Montenegro	88–66	Czech Republic	Warsaw
Germany	71–63	Austria	Warsaw
9 July 2007
Sweden	61–65	Germany	Warsaw
Austria	85–83	Montenegro	Warsaw
10 July 2007
Czech Republic	70–64	Austria	Warsaw
Montenegro	92–69	Sweden	Warsaw

=== Group B ===
Team	Pld	W	L	PF	PA	Pts
Poland	4	4	0	316	213	8
Estonia	4	2	2	246	246	6
Netherlands	4	2	2	302	293	6
Ireland	4	1	3	241	304	5
Switzerland	4	1	3	252	301	5

6 July 2007
Estonia	71–47	Ireland	Warsaw
Poland	86–48	Switzerland	Warsaw
7 July 2007
Netherlands	63–70	Estonia	Warsaw
Ireland	44–78	Poland	Warsaw
8 July 2007
Switzerland	73–74	Ireland	Warsaw
Poland	85–73	Netherlands	Warsaw
9 July 2007
Estonia	48–67	Poland	Warsaw
Netherlands	84–62	Switzerland	Warsaw
10 July 2007
Ireland	76–82	Netherlands	Warsaw
Switzerland	69–57	Estonia	Warsaw

=== Group C ===
Team	Pld	W	L	PF	PA	Pts
Ukraine	3	3	0	289	194	6
Slovakia	3	2	1	188	196	5
Portugal	3	1	2	211	214	4
Belarus	3	0	3	179	263	3

6 July 2007
Portugal	54–55	Slovakia	Warsaw
Ukraine	107–60	Belarus	Warsaw
8 July 2007
Belarus	72–77	Portugal	Warsaw
Slovakia	54–95	Ukraine	Warsaw
10 July 2007
Portugal	80–87	Ukraine	Warsaw
Belarus	47–79	Slovakia	Warsaw

=== Group D ===
Team	Pld	W	L	PF	PA	Pts
Finland	3	2	1	257	219	5
Great Britain	3	2	1	214	214	5
Belgium	3	1	2	207	219	4
Romania	3	1	2	204	230	4

6 July 2007
Finland	84–58	Great Britain	Warsaw
Belgium	65–55	Romania	Warsaw
8 July 2007
Romania	87–86	Finland	Warsaw
Great Britain	77–68	Belgium	Warsaw
10 July 2007
Finland	87–74	Belgium	Warsaw
Romania	62–79	Great Britain	Warsaw

== Qualifying round ==
The eight top teams were allocated in two groups of four teams each. Teams coming from the same initial group didn't play again vs. each other, but "carried" the results of the matches played between them for the first round.

Team advanced to Semifinals
Team competed in 5th–8th playoffs

=== Group E ===
Team	Pld	W	L	PF	PA	Pts
Montenegro	3	3	0	228	206	6
Germany	3	2	1	250	206	5
Poland	3	1	2	196	205	4
Estonia	3	0	3	181	238	3

11 July 2007
Montenegro	80–71	Estonia	Warsaw
Germany	85–68	Poland	Warsaw
12 July 2007
Poland	61–72	Montenegro	Warsaw
Estonia	62–91	Germany	Warsaw

=== Group F ===
Team	Pld	W	L	PF	PA	Pts
Ukraine	3	3	0	267	194	6
Finland	3	2	1	220	218	5
Slovakia	3	1	2	205	233	4
Great Britain	3	0	3	200	247	3

11 July 2007
Ukraine	79–73	Great Britain	Warsaw
Slovakia	67–69	Finland	Warsaw
12 July 2007
Finland	67–93	Ukraine	Warsaw
Great Britain	69–84	Slovakia	Warsaw

== Classification round ==
The ten bottom teams were allocated in two groups of four teams each. Teams coming from the same initial group didn't play again vs. each other, but "carried" the results of the matches played between them for the first round.

Team advanced to 9th–10th game
Team advanced to 11th–12th game
Team advanced to 13th–14th game
Team advanced to 15th–16th game
Team competed in 17th–18th game

=== Group G ===
Team	Pld	W	L	PF	PA	Pts	Tie-breaker
Sweden	4	3	1	291	267	7	1–1 (+17)
Austria	4	3	1	326	289	7	1–1 (−3)
Czech Republic	4	3	1	255	257	7	1–1 (−14)
Portugal	4	1	3	283	310	5	
Belarus	4	0	4	285	317	4	

11 July 2007
Belarus	68–72	Sweden	Warsaw
Portugal	63–65	Czech Republic	Warsaw
12 July 2007
Austria	93–77	Belarus	Warsaw
Sweden	82–76	Portugal	Warsaw
13 July 2007
Belarus	68–75	Czech Republic	Warsaw
Portugal	67–91	Austria	Warsaw

=== Group H ===
Team	Pld	W	L	PF	PA	Pts	Tie-breaker
Belgium	4	3	1	311	283	7	1–1 (+10)
Ireland	4	3	1	292	275	7	1–1 (+1)
Netherlands	4	3	1	302	280	7	1–1 (−11)
Switzerland	4	1	3	302	326	5	
Romania	4	0	4	239	282	4	

11 July 2007
Romania	45–60	Ireland	Warsaw
Belgium	94–86	Switzerland	Warsaw
12 July 2007
Netherlands	76–65	Romania	Warsaw
Ireland	82–75	Belgium	Warsaw
13 July 2007
Romania	74–81	Switzerland	Warsaw
Belgium	77–60	Netherlands	Warsaw

== Knockout stage ==
=== 17th–18th game ===
July 15
9:15

Report

Belarus	74–93	Romania
Scoring by quarter: 23–14, 24–27, 12–34, 15–18
Pts: Shylovich 24; Rebs: Shylovich 8 Asts: Skrypko 4		Pts: Jiscanu 17; Rebs: Nicoara 15; Asts: Mandache 6

Warsaw
Attendance: 50
Referees: Marek Cmikiewicz (POL), Majid Shahab (WAL), Omer Esteron (ISR)

=== 15th–16th game ===
July 15
11:15

Report

Portugal	90–81	Switzerland
Scoring by quarter: 21–28, 27–15, 22–25, 20–13
Pts: Graça, Silva 17; Rebs: Sico 11; Asts: Pinto 9		Pts: Molteni 32; Rebs: Molteni, Ramseier 15; Asts: four players 3

Warsaw
Attendance: 50
Referees: Doru Vinasi (ROU), Benjamin Barth (GER), Atso Matsalu (EST)

=== 13th–14th game ===
July 15
13:15

Report

Czech Republic	73–60	Netherlands
Scoring by quarter: 16–14, 24–9, 17–16, 16–21
Pts: Hubálek 15; Rebs: Jelinek 7 Asts: Hemmy 5		Pts: Oudendag 24; Rebs: Oudendag 13; Asts: Sloote 3

Warsaw
Attendance: 50
Referees: Sérgio Silva (POR), Henrykh Bekish (BLR), Francis Santos (GIB)

=== 11th–12th game ===
July 15
15:15

Report

Austria	66–67	Ireland
Scoring by quarter: 23–20, 13–14, 17–9, 13–24
Pts: Poiger 21; Rebs: Poiger 9 Asts: Schreiner 4		Pts: Cuff 15; Rebs: McDermott 18; Asts: Kinevane 4

Warsaw
Attendance: 50
Referees: Marcello Reatto (ITA), Karel Kraaijeveld (NED), Luca Carlini (SUI)

=== 9th–10th game ===
July 15
17:15

Report

Sweden	84–82	Belgium
Scoring by quarter: 20–19, 16–24, 25–18, 23–21
Pts: Jerebko 28; Rebs: Jerebko 15; Asts: Koutras 7		Pts: Guillemyn 19; Rebs: Mestdagh 4 Asts: Guillemyn 7

Warsaw
Attendance: 50
Referees: Sigmundur Herbertsson (ISL), Sergey Krug (RUS), Jurgis Laurinavicius (LTU)

=== 5th–8th playoffs ===
Playoffs
July 14, Warsaw
Estonia	59
Slovakia	47
July 14, Warsaw
Great Britain	64
Poland	71

Fifth place
July 15, Warsaw
Estonia	58
Poland	74
Seventh place
July 15, Warsaw
Slovakia	75
Great Britain	68

=== Championship ===
Playoffs
July 14, Warsaw
Finland	53
Montenegro	83
July 14, Warsaw
Ukraine	80
Germany	56

Final
July 15, Warsaw
Montenegro	89
Ukraine	68
Third place
July 15, Warsaw
Finland	76
Germany	73

2007 FIBA Europe U-20
Championship Division B

Montenegro
First title

== Final standings ==
Rank	Team
Gold medal	Montenegro
Silver medal	Ukraine
Bronze medal	Finland
4th	Germany
5th	Poland
6th	Estonia
7th	Slovakia
8th	Great Britain
9th	Sweden
10th	Belgium
11th	Ireland
12th	Austria
13th	Czech Republic
14th	Netherlands
15th	Portugal
16th	Switzerland
17th	Romania
18th	Belarus

== Stats leaders ==
=== Points ===
Rank	Name	Points	Games	PPG
1.	(Romania) Titus Nicoara	146	7	20.9
2.	(Austria) Richard Poiger	138	7	19.7
2.	(Sweden) Jonas Jerebko	136	7	19.4
4.	(Ukraine) Oleksandr Kolchenko	136	7	19.4
5.	(Poland) Kamil Pietras	144	8	18.0

=== Rebounds ===
Rank	Name	Points	Games	RPG
1.	(Romania) Titus Nicoara	87	7	12.4
2.	(Switzerland) Westher Molteni	81	7	11.6
3.	(Sweden) Jonas Jerebko	75	7	10.7
4.	(United Kingdom) Daniel Clark	74	7	10.6
5.	(Poland) Kamil Pietras	82	8	10.3

=== Assists ===
Rank	Name	Points	Games	RPG
1.	(Austria) Thomas Schreiner	39	7	5.6
2.	(Belgium) Niels Marnegrave	27	5	5.4
3.	(Estonia) Sten-Timmu Sokk	38	8	4.8
4.	(Republic of Ireland) Scott Kinevane	32	7	4.6
5.	(Montenegro) Goran Martinić	35	8	4.4
