= Finland men's national under-20 basketball team =

Finland
- FIBA zone: FIBA Europe
- National federation: Finnish Basketball Association

U20 EuroBasket
- Appearances: 3
- Medals: None

U20 EuroBasket Division B
- Appearances: 17
- Medals: Gold: 1 (2015); Bronze: 3 (2006, 2007, 2024)

The Finland men's national under-20 basketball team is a national basketball team of Finland, administered by the Finnish Basketball Association. It represents the country in international under-20 men's basketball competitions.

== FIBA U20 EuroBasket participations ==
Year	Position
(Greece) 1992	Did not qualify
(Slovenia) 1994	10th
(Turkey) 1996	Did not qualify
(Italy) 1998	Did not qualify
(North Macedonia) 2000	Did not qualify
(Lithuania) 2002	Did not qualify
(Czech Republic) 2004	Did not qualify
(Slovakia) Division-B 2005	8th
(Georgia (country)) Division-B 2006	3rd
(Montenegro) Division-B 2007	3rd
(Germany) Division-B 2008	18th
(North Macedonia) Division-B 2009	7th
(Austria) Division-B 2010	11th
(Bosnia and Herzegovina) Division-B 2011	10th
(Bulgaria) Division-B 2012	8th
(Romania) Division-B 2013	10th
(Bosnia and Herzegovina) Division-B 2014	7th
(Hungary) Division-B 2015	1st
(Finland) 2016	15th
(Romania) Division-B 2017	9th
(Bulgaria) Division-B 2018	5th
(Portugal) Division-B 2019	11th
(Georgia (country)) Division-B 2022	4th
(North Macedonia) Division-B 2023	9th
(Romania) Division-B 2024	3rd
(Greece) 2025	15th

== See also ==
- Finland men's national basketball team
- Finland men's national under-17 basketball team
- Finland women's national under-18 basketball team
