= 1994 FIBA Europe Under-20 Championship =

International basketball competition

1994 FIBA U20 European Championship
2nd FIBA Under-20 European Basketball Championship

Tournament details
- Host country: Slovenia
- Dates: 3–10 July 1994
- Teams: 12 (from 1 federation)
- Venue: (in 3 host cities)

Final positions
- Champions: Belarus (1st title)

Tournament statistics
- Top scorer: (Slovenia) Boris Gorenc (26.4)
- PPG (Team): Slovenia (89.7)

The 1994 FIBA Europe Under-20 Championship (known at that time as 1994 European Championship for Men 'Under22 and Under') was the second edition of the FIBA Europe Under-20 Championship. The cities of Maribor, Postojna and Ljubljana, in Slovenia, hosted the tournament. Belarus won their first title.

== Qualification ==
=== Qualified teams ===
- Belarus
- Finland
- France
- Germany
- Greece
- Israel
- Italy
- Russia
- Slovakia
- Slovenia
- Spain
- Turkey

== Preliminary round ==
The twelve teams were allocated in two groups of six teams each.

=== Group A ===
Team	Pld	W	L	PF	PA	PD	Pts	Qualification
Greece	5	3	2	388	388	0	8 (Note: GRE 2–0; BLR 1–1; SLO 0–2)	Advanced to Semifinals
Belarus	5	3	2	413	380	+33	8	Advanced to Semifinals
Slovenia	5	3	2	466	437	+29	8	Competed in 5th–8th playoffs
Israel	5	2	3	408	404	+4	7 (Note: ISR 1–1 (+4); FIN 1–1 (−1); FRA 1–1 (−3))	Competed in 5th–8th playoffs
Finland	5	2	3	394	435	−41	7	Competed in 9th–12th playoffs
France	5	2	3	371	396	−25	7	Competed in 9th–12th playoffs

Notes:

3 July
Finland	92–88	Israel
Slovenia	97–98	Belarus
Greece	65–72	France
4 July
Israel	88–102	Slovenia
Greece	98–87	Belarus
France	86–81	Finland
5 July
Israel	80–72	France
Slovenia	75–76	Greece
Belarus	84–47	Finland
6 July
Finland	83–76	Greece
Belarus	65–81	Israel
Slovenia	91–84	France
7 July
Greece	73–71	Israel
France	57–79	Belarus
Slovenia	101–91	Finland

=== Group B ===
Team	Pld	W	D	L	PF	PA	PD	Pts	Qualification
Spain	5	4	0	1	408	331	+77	8	Advanced to Semifinals
Italy	5	3	0	2	424	412	+12	6 (Note: ITA 98–95 RUS)	Advanced to Semifinals
Russia	5	3	0	2	417	388	+29	6	Competed in 5th–8th playoffs
Turkey	5	2	0	3	387	387	0	4 (Note: TUR 75–66 GER)	Competed in 5th–8th playoffs
Germany	5	2	0	3	380	392	−12	4	Competed in 9th–12th playoffs
Slovakia	5	1	0	4	328	424	−96	2	Competed in 9th–12th playoffs

Notes:

3 July
Slovakia	76–75	Turkey
Germany	73–70	Russia
Italy	66–95	Spain
4 July
Turkey	75–66	Germany
Spain	79–54	Slovakia
Italy	98–95	Russia
5 July
Turkey	66–83	Spain
Russia	89–63	Slovakia
Italy	96–70	Germany
6 July
Italy	88–65	Slovakia
Russia	86–84	Turkey
Spain	81–68	Germany
7 July
Italy	76–87	Turkey
Germany	103–70	Slovakia
Spain	70–77	Russia

== Knockout stage ==
=== 9th–12th playoffs ===
Playoffs
9 July
France	70
Germany	71
9 July
Finland	71
Slovakia	68

Ninth place
10 July
Germany	90
Finland	69
Eleventh place
10 July
France	106
Slovakia	90

=== 5th–8th playoffs ===
Playoffs
9 July
Israel	77
Russia	69
9 July
Turkey	87
Slovenia	85

Fifth place
10 July
Israel	100
Turkey	72
Seventh place
10 July
Russia	92
Slovenia	77

=== Championship ===
Semifinals
9 July
Belarus	69
Spain	67
9 July
Greece	75
Italy	95

Final
10 July
Belarus	96
Italy	91
Third place
10 July
Spain	83
Greece	69

1994 FIBA Europe U-20 Championship

Belarus
First title

== Final standings ==
Rank	Team
Gold medal	Belarus
Silver medal	Italy
Bronze medal	Spain
4th	Greece
5th	Israel
6th	Turkey
7th	Russia
8th	Slovenia
9th	Germany
10th	Finland
11th	France
12th	Slovakia
