= 2022 FIBA U20 European Championship =

23rd edition of the European basketball championship

Tournament details
- Host country: Montenegro
- City: Podgorica
- Dates: 16–24 July 2022
- Teams: 16 (from 1 confederation)
- Venues: 2 (in 1 host city)

Final positions
- Champions: Spain (3rd title)
- Runners-up: Lithuania
- Third place: Montenegro
- Fourth place: Israel

Tournament statistics
- MVP: (Spain) Juan Núñez
- Top scorer: (Lithuania) Mantas Rubštavičius (19.7 ppg)
- Top rebounds: (Turkey) Adem Bona (10.9 rpg)
- Top assists: (Croatia) Vito Kučić (6.4 apg)
- PPG (Team): Spain (83.3 ppg)
- RPG (Team): Turkey (41.3 rpg)
- APG (Team): Spain (20.1 apg)

Official website
- www.fiba.basketball

The 2022 FIBA U20 European Championship was the 23rd edition of the European basketball championship for national under-20 teams. It was played from 16 to 24 July 2022 in Podgorica, Montenegro. Spain men's national under-20 basketball team won the tournament and became the European champions for the third time.

== Participating teams ==
- Belgium ▲ (Third place, 2019 FIBA U20 European Championship Division B)
- Croatia
- Czech Republic ▲ (Runners-up, 2019 FIBA U20 European Championship Division B)
- France
- Germany
- Greece
- Israel
- Italy
- Lithuania
- Montenegro
- Portugal ▲ (Winners, 2019 FIBA U20 European Championship Division B)
- Poland
- Slovenia
- Spain
- Turkey
- Ukraine

== First round ==
The draw of the first round was held on 15 February 2022 in Freising, Germany.

In the first round, the teams were drawn into four groups of four. All teams advance to the playoffs.

=== Group A ===
Pos	Team	Pld	W	L	PF	PA	PD	Pts
1	France	3	2	1	225	204	+21	5
2	Belgium	3	2	1	217	225	−8	5
3	Croatia	3	1	2	217	226	−9	4
4	Slovenia	3	1	2	212	216	−4	4

Source: FIBA

16 July 2022

Boxscore

Croatia	65–76	France

Bemax Arena, Podgorica

16 July 2022

Boxscore

Belgium	76–64	Slovenia

Bemax Arena, Podgorica

17 July 2022

Boxscore

Slovenia	74–77	Croatia

Voco, Podgorica

17 July 2022

Boxscore

France	86–65	Belgium

Voco, Podgorica

18 July 2022

Boxscore

Slovenia	74–63	France

Voco, Podgorica

18 July 2022

Boxscore

Croatia	75–76	Belgium

Voco, Podgorica

=== Group B ===
Pos	Team	Pld	W	L	PF	PA	PD	Pts
1	Israel	3	2	1	238	237	+1	5
2	Italy	3	2	1	242	228	+14	5
3	Greece	3	1	2	234	214	+20	4
4	Portugal	3	1	2	213	248	−35	4

Source: FIBA

16 July 2022

Boxscore

Greece	65–69	Israel

Voco, Podgorica

16 July 2022

Boxscore

Portugal	67–71	Italy

Voco, Podgorica

17 July 2022

Boxscore

Israel	86–90	Portugal

Bemax Arena, Podgorica

17 July 2022

Boxscore

Italy	89–78	Greece

Bemax Arena, Podgorica

18 July 2022

Boxscore

Greece	91–56	Portugal

Voco, Podgorica

18 July 2022

Boxscore

Italy	82–83	Israel

Bemax Arena, Podgorica

=== Group C ===
Pos	Team	Pld	W	L	PF	PA	PD	Pts
1	Spain	3	3	0	252	194	+58	6
2	Lithuania	3	1	2	242	212	+30	4
3	Ukraine	3	1	2	215	256	−41	4
4	Czech Republic	3	1	2	235	282	−47	4

Source: FIBA

16 July 2022

Boxscore

Czech Republic	98–86	Ukraine

Voco, Podgorica

16 July 2022

Boxscore

Lithuania	65–75	Spain

Voco, Podgorica

17 July 2022

Boxscore

Spain	88–71	Czech Republic

Bemax Arena, Podgorica

17 July 2022

Boxscore

Ukraine	71–69	Lithuania

Voco, Podgorica

18 July 2022

Boxscore

Ukraine	58–89	Spain

Bemax Arena, Podgorica

18 July 2022

Boxscore

Lithuania	108–66	Czech Republic

Bemax Arena, Podgorica

=== Group D ===
Pos	Team	Pld	W	L	PF	PA	PD	Pts
1	Montenegro (H)	3	2	1	215	225	−10	5
2	Turkey	3	2	1	190	195	−5	5
3	Germany	3	1	2	213	211	+2	4
4	Poland	3	1	2	205	192	+13	4

Source: FIBA
(H) Hosts

16 July 2022

Boxscore

Turkey	66–65	Germany

Bemax Arena, Podgorica

16 July 2022

Boxscore

Poland	83–62	Montenegro

Bemax Arena, Podgorica

17 July 2022

Boxscore

Germany	76–69	Poland

Voco, Podgorica

17 July 2022

Boxscore

Montenegro	77–70	Turkey

Bemax Arena, Podgorica

18 July 2022

Boxscore

Turkey	54–53	Poland

Voco, Podgorica

18 July 2022

Boxscore

Montenegro	76–72	Germany

Bemax Arena, Podgorica

== Playoff brackets ==
=== Main bracket ===
Round of 16
20 July
France	54
Portugal	41
20 July
Lithuania	75
Germany	70
20 July
Italy	72
Croatia	88
20 July
Montenegro	80
Czech Republic	78
20 July
Israel	77
Slovenia	60
20 July
Turkey	72
Ukraine	56
20 July
Belgium	87
Greece	72
20 July
Spain	83
Poland	60

Quarterfinals
21 July
France	79
Lithuania	89
21 July
Croatia	67
Montenegro	89
21 July
Israel	82
Turkey	73
21 July
Belgium	71
Spain	95

Semifinals
23 July
Lithuania	67
Montenegro	63
23 July
Israel	75
Spain	84

Final
24 July
Lithuania	61
Spain	69
3rd place match
24 July
Montenegro	86
Israel	77

=== 5th place bracket ===
5th–8th place semifinals
23 July
France	83
Croatia	71
23 July
Turkey	78
Belgium	75

5th place match
24 July
France	84
Turkey	65
7th place match
24 July
Croatia	93
Belgium	77

=== 9th place bracket ===
9th–16th place quarterfinals
21 July
Portugal	60
Germany	86
21 July
Italy	71
Czech Republic	70
21 July
Slovenia	86
Ukraine	81
21 July
Greece	82
Poland	67

9th–12th place semifinals
23 July
Germany	59
Italy	67
23 July
Slovenia	87
Greece	79

9th place match
24 July
Italy	81
Slovenia	78
11th place match
24 July
Germany	83
Greece	68

=== 13th place bracket ===
13th–16th place semifinals
23 July
Portugal	82
Czech Republic	66
23 July
Ukraine	59
Poland	95

13th place match
24 July
Portugal	57
Poland	67
15th place match
24 July
Czech Republic	80
Ukraine	61

== Playoff results ==
=== Round of 16 ===
20 July 2022
14:15

Boxscore

Spain	83–60	Poland

Bemax Arena, Podgorica

20 July 2022
14:15

Boxscore

Turkey	72–56	Ukraine

Voco, Podgorica

20 July 2022
16:30

Boxscore

Belgium	87–72	Greece

Bemax Arena, Podgorica

20 July 2022
16:30

Boxscore

Israel	77–60	Slovenia

Voco, Podgorica

20 July 2022
18:45

Boxscore

Italy	72–88	Croatia

Bemax Arena, Podgorica

20 July 2022
18:45

Boxscore

Lithuania	75–70	Germany

Voco, Podgorica

20 July 2022
21:00

Boxscore

France	54–41	Portugal

Voco, Podgorica

20 July 2022
21:00

Boxscore

Montenegro	80–78	Czech Republic

Bemax Arena, Podgorica

=== 9th–16th place quarterfinals ===
21 July 2022
14:15

Boxscore

Greece	82–67	Poland

Voco, Podgorica

21 July 2022
16:30

Boxscore

Slovenia	86–81	Ukraine

Voco, Podgorica

21 July 2022
18:45

Boxscore

Portugal	60–86	Germany

Voco, Podgorica

21 July 2022
21:00

Boxscore

Italy	71–70	Czech Republic

Voco, Podgorica

=== 13th–16th place semifinals ===
23 July 2022
14:15

Boxscore

Portugal	82–66	Czech Republic

Voco, Podgorica

23 July 2022
16:30

Boxscore

Poland	95–59	Ukraine

Voco, Podgorica

=== 15th place match ===
24 July 2022
11:30

Boxscore

Czech Republic	80–61	Ukraine

Voco, Podgorica

=== 13th place match ===
24 July 2022
16:00

Boxscore

Portugal	57–67	Poland

Bemax Arena, Podgorica

=== 9th–12th place semifinals ===
23 July 2022
18:45

Boxscore

Germany	59–67	Italy

Voco, Podgorica

23 July 2022
21:00

Boxscore

Greece	79–87	Slovenia

Voco, Podgorica

=== 11th place match ===
24 July 2022
13:45

Boxscore

Germany	83–68	Greece

Voco, Podgorica

=== 9th place match ===
24 July 2022
16:00

Boxscore

Italy	81–78	Slovenia

Voco, Podgorica

=== Championship quarterfinals ===
21 July 2022
14:15

Boxscore

Belgium	71–95	Spain

Bemax Arena, Podgorica

21 July 2022
16:30

Boxscore

Israel	82–73	Turkey

Bemax Arena, Podgorica

21 July 2022
18:45

Boxscore

France	79–89	Lithuania

Bemax Arena, Podgorica

21 July 2022
21:00

Boxscore

Croatia	67–89	Montenegro

Bemax Arena, Podgorica

=== 5th–8th place semifinals ===
23 July 2022
14:15

Boxscore

France	83–71	Croatia

Bemax Arena, Podgorica

23 July 2022
16:30

Boxscore

Belgium	75–78	Turkey

Bemax Arena, Podgorica

=== 7th place match ===
24 July 2022
18:15

Boxscore

Croatia	93–77	Belgium

Voco, Podgorica

=== 5th place match ===
24 July 2022
13:45

Boxscore

France	84–65	Turkey

Bemax Arena, Podgorica

=== Championship semifinals ===
23 July 2022
18:45

Boxscore

Spain	84–75	Israel

Bemax Arena, Podgorica

23 July 2022
21:00

Boxscore

Lithuania	67–63	Montenegro

Bemax Arena, Podgorica

=== 3rd place match ===
24 July 2022
18:15

Boxscore

Montenegro	86–77	Israel

Bemax Arena, Podgorica

=== Final ===
24 July 2022
20:30

Boxscore

Lithuania	61–69	Spain

Bemax Arena, Podgorica

== Final standings ==
Rank	Team	Record
1st place, gold medalist(s)	Spain	7–0
2nd place, silver medalist(s)	Lithuania	4–3
3rd place, bronze medalist(s)	Montenegro	5–2
4	Israel	4–3
5	France	5–2
6	Turkey	4–3
7	Croatia	3–4
8	Belgium	3–4
9	Italy	5–2
10	Slovenia	3–4
11	Germany	3–4
12	Greece	2–5
13	Poland	3–4
14	Portugal	2–5
15	Czech Republic	2–5
16	Ukraine	1–6

Relegated to the 2023 FIBA U20 European Championship Division B

== Awards ==
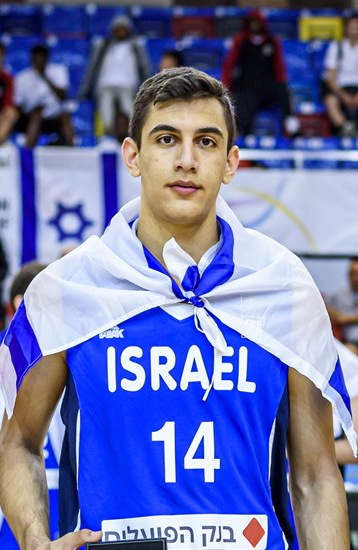
Noam Dovrat

=== Most Valuable Player ===
Most Valuable Player
(Spain) Juan Núñez

=== All-Tournament Team ===
- (Spain) Juan Núñez
- (Montenegro) Fedor Žugić
- (Israel) Noam Dovrat
- (Lithuania) Mantas Rubštavičius
- (Turkey) Adem Bona

== See also ==
- 2022 FIBA U20 European Championship Division B
