= 2019 FIBA U20 European Championship =

22nd edition of the FIBA U20 European Championship

Tournament details
- Host country: Israel
- City: Tel Aviv
- Dates: 13–21 July
- Teams: 16
- Venue(s): 3 (in 2 host cities)

Final positions
- Champions: (gold) Israel (2nd title)
- Runners-up: (silver) Spain
- Third place: (bronze) Germany
- Fourth place: France

Tournament statistics
- Games played: 56
- MVP: (Israel) Deni Avdija
- Top scorer: (Greece) Georgios Kalaitzakis (19.7 ppg)
- Top rebounds: (Montenegro) Marko Simonović (13 rpg)
- Top assists: (Israel) Yam Madar (7.7 apg)

Official website
- www.fiba.basketball

The 2019 FIBA U20 European Championship was the 22nd edition of the FIBA U20 European Championship. The competition took place in Tel Aviv, Israel from 13 to 21 July 2019.

== Participating teams ==
- Croatia
- France
- Germany
- Great Britain
- Greece
- Israel
- Italy
- Latvia ▲ (3rd place, 2018 FIBA U20 European Championship Division B)
- Lithuania
- Montenegro
- Poland ▲ (Winners, 2018 FIBA U20 European Championship Division B)
- Serbia
- Slovenia ▲ (Runners-up, 2018 FIBA U20 European Championship Division B)
- Spain
- Turkey
- Ukraine

== Venues ==
2019 FIBA U20 European Championship is located in Israel	Tel Aviv	Ramat Gan
2019 FIBA U20 European Championship is located in Israel	Drive in Arena	Shalom Zysman Sports Hall
2019 FIBA U20 European Championship is located in Israel	Capacity: 3,504	Capacity: 1,500

== First round ==
In this round, the 16 teams are allocated in four groups of four teams each. All teams advance to the Second Round of 16.

All times are local (UTC+3).

=== Group A ===
Pos	Team	Pld	W	L	PF	PA	PD	Pts
1	France	3	3	0	214	178	+36	6
2	Turkey	3	2	1	197	183	+14	5
3	Montenegro	3	1	2	191	210	−19	4
4	Great Britain	3	0	3	184	215	−31	3

Source: FIBA
Rules for classification: 1) Points; 2) Head-to-head results; 3) Points difference; 4) Points scored.

13 July 2019
15:30

Boxscore

Turkey	69–56	Great Britain
Scoring by quarter: 14–16, 20–9, 15–17, 20–14

Shalom Zysman Sports Hall, Ramat Gan

13 July 2019
17:45

Boxscore

France	71–61	Montenegro
Scoring by quarter: 16–19, 10–19, 21–15, 24–8

Shalom Zysman Sports Hall, Ramat Gan

14 July 2019
13:45

Boxscore

Montenegro	58–71	Turkey
Scoring by quarter: 17–17, 17–20, 15–26, 9–8

Shlomo Group Arena, Tel Aviv

14 July 2019
18:15

Boxscore

Great Britain	60–74	France
Scoring by quarter: 16–14, 11–24, 21–20, 12–16

Shlomo Group Arena, Tel Aviv

15 July 2019
13:45

Boxscore

Montenegro	72–68	Great Britain
Scoring by quarter: 15–20, 24–19, 19–14, 14–15

Shalom Zysman Sports Hall, Ramat Gan

15 July 2019
20:30

Boxscore

Turkey	57–69	France
Scoring by quarter: 13–15, 18–13, 13–19, 13–22

Shalom Zysman Sports Hall, Ramat Gan

=== Group B ===
Pos	Team	Pld	W	L	PF	PA	PD	Pts
1	Serbia	3	2	1	228	218	+10	5
2	Israel (H)	3	2	1	259	241	+18	5
3	Italy	3	1	2	229	216	+13	4
4	Ukraine	3	1	2	200	241	−41	4

Source: FIBA
Rules for classification: 1) Points; 2) Head-to-head results; 3) Points difference; 4) Points scored.
(H) Hosts

13 July 2019
21:00

Boxscore

Serbia	92–81	Israel
Scoring by quarter: 19–19, 24–14, 21–28, 28–20
Pts: Simovic 18; Rebs: Simovic 9 Asts: Uskokovic 8		Pts: Madar 24; Rebs: Avdija & Kravits 8 Asts: Madar 9

Shlomo Group Arena, Tel Aviv

13 July 2019
21:00

Boxscore

Italy	85–58	Ukraine
Scoring by quarter: 20–12, 29–19, 21–13, 15–14
Pts: Stefanini & Caruso 17; Rebs: Caruso 11; Asts: Pajola 3		Pts: Sanon 14; Rebs: Grytsak 7 Asts: Sanon 4

Shalom Zysman Sports Hall, Ramat Gan

14 July 2019
16:00

Boxscore

Ukraine	68–63	Serbia
Scoring by quarter: 20–15, 17–19, 15–10, 16–19
Pts: Sanon 30; Rebs: Grytsak 9 Asts: Kozak 2		Pts: Simovic 12; Rebs: Momirov 11; Asts: Uskokovic 3

Shlomo Group Arena, Tel Aviv

14 July 2019
20:30

Boxscore

Israel	85–75	Italy
Scoring by quarter: 18–19, 30–15, 10–21, 27–20
Pts: Madar 20; Rebs: Avdija 9 Asts: Madar 8		Pts: Caruso 20; Rebs: Caruso 11; Asts: Stefanini 5

Shlomo Group Arena, Tel Aviv

15 July 2019
18:15

Boxscore

Serbia	73–69	Italy
Scoring by quarter: 20–19, 21–17, 17–19, 15–14
Pts: Pecarski 25; Rebs: Pecarski 13; Asts: Uskoković & Vulikić 4		Pts: Stefanini 27; Rebs: Caruso 10; Asts: Pajola 6

Shalom Zysman Sports Hall, Ramat Gan

15 July 2019
20:30

Boxscore

Ukraine	74–93	Israel
Scoring by quarter: 29–17, 16–26, 16–23, 13–27
Pts: Voinalovych 22; Rebs: Grytsak 11; Asts: Sanon 5		Pts: Avdija 21; Rebs: Avdija 10; Asts: Madar 9

Shlomo Group Arena, Tel Aviv

=== Group C ===
Pos	Team	Pld	W	L	PF	PA	PD	Pts
1	Spain	3	3	0	241	194	+47	6
2	Croatia	3	2	1	243	232	+11	5
3	Germany	3	1	2	227	224	+3	4
4	Latvia	3	0	3	199	260	−61	3

Source: FIBA
Rules for classification: 1) Points; 2) Head-to-head results; 3) Points difference; 4) Points scored.

13 July 2019
14:15

Boxscore

Germany	92–66	Latvia
Scoring by quarter: 22–23, 26–22, 20–11, 24–10

Shalom Zysman Sports Hall, Ramat Gan

13 July 2019
16:30

Boxscore

Spain	85–73	Croatia
Scoring by quarter: 26–11, 16–14, 22–21, 21–27

Shlomo Group Arena, Tel Aviv

14 July 2019
16:00

Boxscore

Croatia	80–69	Germany
Scoring by quarter: 17–11, 30–13, 16–20, 17–25

Shalom Zysman Sports Hall, Ramat Gan

14 July 2019
18:15

Boxscore

Latvia	55–78	Spain
Scoring by quarter: 7–19, 19–22, 15–19, 14–18

Shalom Zysman Sports Hall, Ramat Gan

15 July 2019
13:45

Boxscore

Latvia	78–90	Croatia
Scoring by quarter: 22–17, 12–28, 21–21, 23–24

Shlomo Group Arena, Tel Aviv

15 July 2019
18:15

Boxscore

Spain	78–66	Germany
Scoring by quarter: 19–16, 19–20, 23–16, 17–14

Shlomo Group Arena, Tel Aviv

=== Group D ===
Pos	Team	Pld	W	L	PF	PA	PD	Pts
1	Lithuania	3	2	1	261	241	+20	5
2	Greece	3	2	1	264	213	+51	5
3	Poland	3	1	2	197	266	−69	4
4	Slovenia	3	1	2	240	242	−2	4

Source: FIBA
Rules for classification: 1) Points; 2) Head-to-head results; 3) Points difference; 4) Points scored.

13 July 2019
14:15

Boxscore

Greece	90–79	Slovenia
Scoring by quarter: 25–15, 21–22, 20–22, 24–20

Shlomo Group Arena, Tel Aviv

13 July 2019
18:45

Boxscore

Lithuania	101–71	Poland
Scoring by quarter: 19–22, 27–13, 26–15, 29–21

Shlomo Group Arena, Tel Aviv

14 July 2019
13:45

Boxscore

Slovenia	84–72	Lithuania
Scoring by quarter: 18–19, 19–24, 22–16, 25–13

Shlomo Group Arena, Tel Aviv

14 July 2019
20:30

Boxscore

Poland	46–88	Greece
Scoring by quarter: 9–22, 16–28, 13–21, 8–17

Shlomo Group Arena, Tel Aviv

15 July 2019
16:00

Boxscore

Slovenia	77–80	Poland
Scoring by quarter: 28–18, 14–23, 10–15, 27–24

Shalom Zysman Sports Hall, Ramat Gan

15 July 2019
16:00

Boxscore

Lithuania	88–86 (OT)	Greece
Scoring by quarter: 18–13, 19–22, 19–21, 11–11, Overtime: 21–19

Shlomo Group Arena, Tel Aviv

== Final round ==
=== Championship bracket ===
Round of 16
17 July
France	68
Ukraine	40
17 July
Croatia	89
Poland	75
17 July
Lithuania	114
Latvia	75
17 July
Israel	88
Montenegro	69
17 July
Serbia	72
Great Britain	77
17 July
Greece	54
Germany	82
17 July
Spain	71
Slovenia	53
17 July
Turkey	82
Italy	80

Quarterfinals
18 July
France	71
Croatia	63
18 July
Lithuania	78
Israel	94
18 July
Great Britain	56
Germany	81
18 July
Spain	70
Turkey	69

Semifinals
20 July
France	70
Israel	81
20 July
Germany	62
Spain	80

Final
21 July
Israel	92
Spain	84
3rd place game
21 July
Germany	73
France	65

=== Round of 16 ===
17 July 2019
13:45

Boxscore

Croatia	89–75	Poland
Scoring by quarter: 23–10, 23–15, 18–23, 25–27
Pts: Jordano 21; Rebs: Vrgoč 9 Asts: Nakić 5		Pts: Kolenda 24; Rebs: Bogucki 9 Asts: Kolenda & Kaminski 3

Shlomo Group Arena, Tel Aviv

17 July 2019
13:45

Boxscore

Greece	54–82	Germany
Scoring by quarter: 6–23, 20–17, 13–23, 15–19
Pts: Kalaitzakis 15; Rebs: Koufopoulos 5 Asts: Four players 2		Pts: Hassfurther 21; Rebs: Herkenhoff 11; Asts: Herkenhoff & Hassfurther 5

Shalom Zysman Sports Hall, Ramat Gan

17 July 2019
16:00

Boxscore

France	68–40	Ukraine
Scoring by quarter: 13–17, 13–6, 24–10, 18–7
Pts: Choupas 14; Rebs: Bazille 8 Asts: Beyhurst & Fevrier 5		Pts: Voinalovych 15; Rebs: Voinalovych & Grytsak 7 Asts: Sanon 3

Shlomo Group Arena, Tel Aviv

17 July 2019
16:00

Boxscore

Serbia	72–77	Great Britain
Scoring by quarter: 15–17, 18–19, 17–16, 22–25
Pts: Pecarski 23; Rebs: Pecarski 11; Asts: Uskoković 6		Pts: Henry 17; Rebs: Kitenge 15; Asts: Round 7

Shalom Zysman Sports Hall, Ramat Gan

17 July 2019
18:15

Boxscore

Lithuania	114–75	Latvia
Scoring by quarter: 28–15, 26–25, 34–13, 26–22
Pts: Velička 21; Rebs: Uleckas 9 Asts: Velička 5		Pts: Kapostins 13; Rebs: Berkis 5 Asts: Brokāns & Hlebovickis 3

Shlomo Group Arena, Tel Aviv

17 July 2019
18:15

Boxscore

Turkey	82–80	Italy
Scoring by quarter: 22–27, 21–12, 13–28, 26–13
Pts: Bitim 25; Rebs: Bitim 7 Asts: Hazer 4		Pts: Stefanini 15; Rebs: Ebeling 9 Asts: Pajola 6

Shalom Zysman Sports Hall, Ramat Gan

17 July 2019
20:30

Boxscore

Israel	88–69	Montenegro
Scoring by quarter: 19–15, 21–19, 26–15, 22–20
Pts: Madar 18; Rebs: Kravits 6 Asts: Madar & Kravits 7		Pts: Simonović 15; Rebs: Simonović 16; Asts: Popovic 4

Shlomo Group Arena, Tel Aviv

17 July 2019
20:30

Boxscore

Spain	71–53	Slovenia
Scoring by quarter: 15–19, 26–8, 13–11, 17–15
Pts: Parrado 14; Rebs: Parra 9 Asts: González & Alocén 5		Pts: Stipanicev 12; Rebs: Stipanicev 5 Asts: Three players 3

Shalom Zysman Sports Hall, Ramat Gan

=== Quarterfinals ===
18 July 2019
13:45

Boxscore

France	71–63	Croatia
Scoring by quarter: 23–10, 12–12, 12–25, 24–16
Pts: Affo Mama 17; Rebs: Choupas 8 Asts: Beyhurst 4		Pts: Nakić 24; Rebs: Vrgoč 11; Asts: Batinić & Šarić 3

Shlomo Group Arena, Tel Aviv

18 July 2019
16:00

Boxscore

Great Britain	56–81	Germany
Scoring by quarter: 15–14, 12–25, 14–25, 15–17
Pts: Robinson 12; Rebs: Kitenge 8 Asts: Round 4		Pts: Herkenhoff 22; Rebs: Herkenhoff 8 Asts: Mattisseck 4

Shlomo Group Arena, Tel Aviv

18 July 2019
18:15

Boxscore

Turkey	69–70	Spain
Scoring by quarter: 16–16, 17–20, 19–11, 17–23
Pts: Hazer 16; Rebs: Akay 8 Asts: Hazer & Akay 4		Pts: Martínez 21; Rebs: Martínez 9 Asts: Alocén 5

Shlomo Group Arena, Tel Aviv

18 July 2019
20:30

Boxscore

Israel	94–78	Lithuania
Scoring by quarter: 20–18, 33–26, 23–17, 18–17
Pts: Adam 17; Rebs: Avdija 10; Asts: Madar 10		Pts: Uleckas 23; Rebs: Kozys 8 Asts: Velička 5

Shlomo Group Arena, Tel Aviv

=== Semifinals ===
20 July 2019
18:45

Boxscore

Spain	80–62	Germany
Scoring by quarter: 25–23, 19–16, 20–14, 16–9
Pts: Martínez & Alocén 17; Rebs: Martínez 13; Asts: Four players 4		Pts: Vrcic & Mattisseck 11; Rebs: Vrcic & Herkenhoff 6 Asts: Mattisseck 3

Shlomo Group Arena, Tel Aviv

20 July 2019
21:15

Boxscore

France	70–81	Israel
Scoring by quarter: 15–20, 20–15, 15–19, 20–27
Pts: Beyhurst 16; Rebs: Kayouloud 8 Asts: Beyhurst 4		Pts: Avdija 26; Rebs: Avdija 11; Asts: Kravits 5

Shlomo Group Arena, Tel Aviv

=== 3rd place game ===
21 July 2019
18:15

Boxscore

France	65–73	Germany
Scoring by quarter: 11–16, 22–22, 15–22, 17–13
Pts: Choupas 22; Rebs: Kayouloud 8 Asts: Choupas 5		Pts: Herkenhoff 20; Rebs: Herkenhoff 8 Asts: Hassfurther 5

Shlomo Group Arena, Tel Aviv

=== Final ===
21 July 2019
20:30

Boxscore

Israel	92–84	Spain
Scoring by quarter: 24–24, 18–18, 24–17, 26–25
Pts: Avdija 23; Rebs: Adam 6 Asts: Madar 8		Pts: González 14; Rebs: Alocén 7 Asts: Alocén 11

Shlomo Group Arena, Tel Aviv
Referees: Siniša Herceg (CRO), Georgios Poursanidis (GRE), Saša Maričić (SER)

=== 5th–8th place bracket ===
5th–8th place semifinals
20 July, 14:15
Croatia	93
Lithuania	94
20 July, 16:30
Great Britain	87
Turkey	104

5th place game
21 July, 13:45
Lithuania	89
Turkey	73
7th place game
21 July, 13:45
Croatia	82
Great Britain	63

=== 9th–16th place bracket ===
9th–16th place quarterfinals
18 July
Ukraine	76
Poland	71
18 July
Latvia	62
Montenegro	79
18 July
Serbia	72
Greece	78
18 July
Slovenia	74
Italy	64

9th–12th place semifinals
20 July, 18:45
Ukraine	72
Montenegro	58
20 July, 21:00
Greece	89
Slovenia	80

9th place game
21 July, 18:15
Ukraine	98
Greece	109
11th place game
21 July, 16:00
Montenegro	73
Slovenia	75

13th–16th place semifinals
20 July, 14:15
Poland	82
Latvia	68
20 July, 16:30
Serbia	63
Italy	86

13th place game
21 July, 16:00
Poland	61
Italy	77
15th place game
21 July, 11:30
Latvia	50
Serbia	71

== Final standings ==
Rank	Team	Record
1st place, gold medalist(s)	Israel	6–1
2nd place, silver medalist(s)	Spain	6–1
3rd place, bronze medalist(s)	Germany	4–3
4	France	5–2
5	Lithuania	5–2
6	Turkey	4–3
7	Croatia	4–3
8	Great Britain	1–6
9	Greece	5–2
10	Ukraine	3–4
11	Slovenia	3–4
12	Montenegro	2–5
13	Italy	3–4
14	Poland	2–5
15	Serbia	3–4
16	Latvia	0–7

Relegated to the 2022 FIBA U20 European Championship Division B

Note: Great Britain has withdrawn from the 2022 championships (both divisions A and B). Thus, Poland was spared from relegation.

== Awards ==
=== Most Valuable Player ===
Most Valuable Player
(Israel) Deni Avdija

=== All-Tournament Team ===
- (Germany) Philipp Herkenhoff
- (Spain) Sergi Martínez Costa
- (Israel) Deni Avdija
- (Israel) Yam Madar
- (Spain) Carlos Alocén

== See also ==
- 2019 FIBA U20 European Championship Division B
