= Israel men's national under-20 basketball team =

National basketball team

Israel
- Joined FIBA: 1939; 87 years ago
- FIBA zone: FIBA Europe
- National federation: איגוד הכדורסל בישראל (Israel Basketball Association)
- Coach: (Israel) Elad Hasin

U21 World Championships
- Appearances: 3
- Medals: None

U20 EuroBasket
- Appearances: 24
- Medals: Gold: 2 (2018, 2019); Silver: 4 (2000, 2004, 2017, 2023)

U20 EuroBasket Division B
- Appearances: 3
- Medals: Bronze: 1 (2012)
| Home | Away |

The Israel men's national under-20 basketball team is a national basketball team of Israel, administered by the Israel Basketball Association. It represents the country in various FIBA youth tournaments. The team usually competes in the FIBA U20 EuroBasket, and used to compete in the now defunct FIBA Under-21 World Championship. This team was originally the Israeli Under-22 national team, until the FIBA Europe Under-22 Championship was changed into an Under-20 age tournament.

== Roster for the 2024 FIBA Europe Under-20 Championship ==
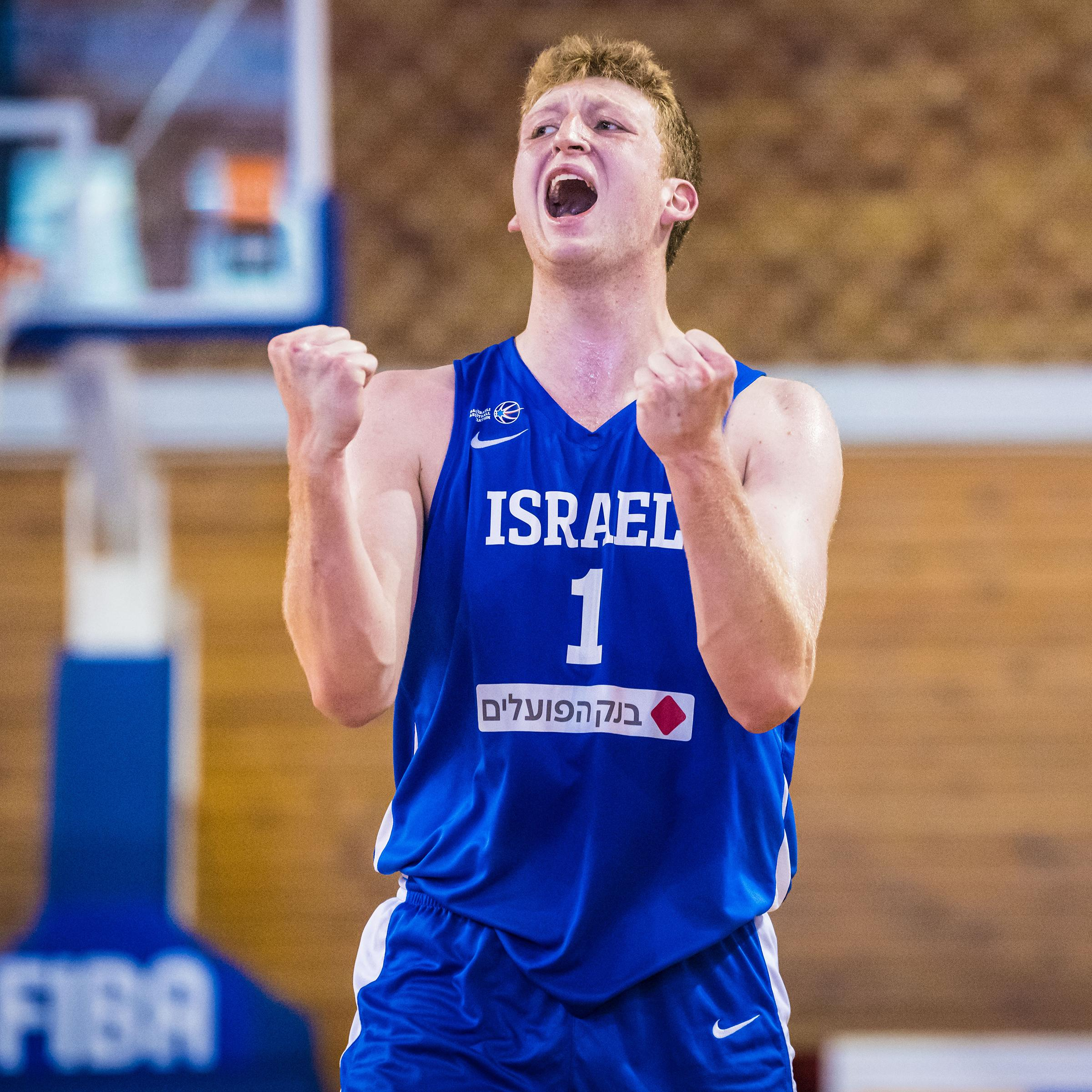
Danny Wolf playing for the Israeli national under-20 basketball team in 2023

Israel men's national basketball team roster
Players
Coaches

| Pos. | No. | Name | Age – Date of birth | Height | Club | Ctr. |
|---|---|---|---|---|---|---|
| PG | 5 | Niv Lempert | 20 – 20 January 2004 | 1.96 m (6 ft 5 in) | Hapoel Gilboa Galil | (Israel) |
| C | 7 | Alon Michaeli | 18 – 27 November 2005 | 2.03 m (6 ft 8 in) | Elitzur Netanya | (Israel) |
| G | 9 | Omri Shelef | 19 – 30 July 2004 | 1.96 m (6 ft 5 in) | Hapoel Be'er Sheva | (Israel) |
| G | 11 | Shachar Doron | 19 – 22 May 2005 | 1.90 m (6 ft 3 in) | Elitzur Shomron | (Israel) |
| G | 12 | Amit Menachem | 20 – 14 March 2004 | 1.83 m (6 ft 0 in) | Maccabi Haifa | (Israel) |
| F | 13 | Eyal Harel | 20 – 2 February 2004 | 1.98 m (6 ft 6 in) | Maccabi Haifa | (Israel) |
| C | 14 | Maxim Filonenko | 18 – 14 December 2005 | 2.06 m (6 ft 9 in) | Hapoel Gilboa Galil | (Israel) |
| C | 18 | Ilay Dolinski | 19 – 6 February 2005 | 2.04 m (6 ft 8 in) | Elitzur Netanya | (Israel) |
| PF | 24 | Yoav Berman | 19 – 4 August 2004 | 1.97 m (6 ft 6 in) | Maccabi Ra'anana | (Israel) |
| PG | 31 | Noam Yaacov | 19 – 20 October 2004 | 1.86 m (6 ft 1 in) | ASVEL Basket | (Israel) |
| F | 33 | Maor Nekrashevich | 19 – 4 November 2004 | 2.00 m (6 ft 7 in) | Maccabi Rishon LeZion | (Israel) |
| SF | 99 | Yuval Hochstadter | 19 – 7 October 2004 | 1.98 m (6 ft 6 in) | - | (Israel) |

Head Coach

- (Israel) Elad Hasin

Assistant Coaches

- (Israel) Amit Schaerf
- (Israel) Yoav Shamir

Legend

- (C) Team captain
- Club – describes last
  club on 13 July 2024
- Age – describes age
  on 13 July 2024

== Participation in FIBA competitions ==
=== FIBA U20 EuroBasket ===
| Division A | | | | | | Division B | | | | | |
| Year | Pos. | GP | W | L | Ref. | Year | Pos. | GP | W | L | Ref. |
|---|---|---|---|---|---|---|---|---|---|---|---|
| (Greece) 1992 | 4th | 7 | 4 | 3 | | | | | | | |
| (Slovenia) 1994 | 5th | 7 | 4 | 3 | | | | | | | |
| (Turkey) 1996 | 9th | 7 | 4 | 3 | | | | | | | |
| (Italy) 1998 | 10th | 7 | 2 | 5 | | | | | | | |
| (North Macedonia) 2000 | 2nd place, silver medalist(s) | 8 | 5 | 3 | | | | | | | |
| (Lithuania) 2002 | 10th | 7 | 1 | 6 | | | | | | | |
| (Czech Republic) 2004 | 2nd place, silver medalist(s) | 8 | 5 | 3 | | | | | | | |
| (Russia) 2005 | 4th | 8 | 3 | 5 | | | | | | | |
| (Turkey) 2006 | 12th | 8 | 4 | 4 | | | | | | | |
| (Slovenia) 2007 | 6th | 8 | 5 | 3 | | | | | | | |
| (Latvia) 2008 | 10th | 8 | 2 | 6 | | | | | | | |
| (Greece) 2009 | 15th | 6 | 1 | 5 | | | | | | | |
| (Croatia) 2010 | Did not qualify | | | | | (Austria) 2010 | 5th | 8 | 6 | 2 | |
| (Spain) 2011 | Did not qualify | | | | | (Bosnia and Herzegovina) 2011 | 11th | 8 | 4 | 4 | |
| (Slovenia) 2012 | Did not qualify | | | | | (Bulgaria) 2012 | 3rd place, bronze medalist(s) | 7 | 5 | 2 | |
| (Estonia) 2013 | 15th | 9 | 4 | 5 | | | | | | | |
| (Greece) 2014 | 7th | 10 | 5 | 5 | | | | | | | |
| (Italy) 2015 | 10th | 9 | 4 | 5 | | | | | | | |
| (Finland) 2016 | 12th | 7 | 3 | 4 | | | | | | | |
| (Greece) 2017 | 2nd place, silver medalist(s) | 7 | 6 | 1 | | | | | | | |
| (Germany) 2018 | 1st place, gold medalist(s) | 7 | 6 | 1 | | | | | | | |
| (Israel) 2019 | 1st place, gold medalist(s) | 7 | 6 | 1 | | | | | | | |
| (Lithuania) 2020 | Canceled due to COVID-19 pandemic in Lithuania | | | | | | | | | | |
| (Montenegro) 2021 | Cancelled due to COVID-19 pandemic in Europe (Note: Replaced with the 2021 FIBA U20 European Challengers) | | | | | | | | | | |
| (Montenegro) 2022 | 4th | 7 | 4 | 3 | | | | | | | |
| (Greece) 2023 | 2nd place, silver medalist(s) | 7 | 4 | 3 | | | | | | | |
| (Poland) 2024 | 10th | 7 | 4 | 3 | | | | | | | |
| (Greece) 2025 | 6th | 7 | 5 | 2 | | | | | | | |
| (Slovenia) 2026 | 10th | 7 | 4 | 3 | | | | | | | |

=== FIBA Under-21 World Championship (defunct) ===
| Year | Pos. | GP | W | L | Ref. |
|---|---|---|---|---|---|
| (Spain) 1993 | 9th | 7 | 4 | 3 | |
| (Japan) 2001 | 7th | 8 | 5 | 3 | |
| (Argentina) 2005 | 10th | 7 | 2 | 5 | |

== See also ==
- Israel men's national basketball team
- Israel men's national under-18 basketball team
- Israel women's national under-20 basketball team
