= Ireland men's national under-20 basketball team =

Ireland
- FIBA zone: FIBA Europe
- National federation: Basketball Ireland

U20 EuroBasket
- Appearances: None

U20 EuroBasket Division B
- Appearances: 12
- Medals: None

The Ireland men's national under-20 basketball team is a national basketball team of Ireland, administered by the Basketball Ireland. It represents the country in international under-20 men's basketball competitions.

== FIBA U20 EuroBasket participations ==
Year	Result in Division B
2005	10th
2006	16th
2007	11th
2008	16th
2016	12th
2017	18th

Year	Result in Division B
2019	20th
2022	9th
2023	16th
2024	14th
2025	7th
2026	5th

== See also ==
- Ireland men's national basketball team
- Ireland men's national under-18 basketball team
- Ireland women's national under-20 basketball team
