= 2009 FIBA Europe Under-20 Championship =

International basketball competition

2009 FIBA U20 European Championship
12th FIBA Under-20 European Basketball Championship

Tournament details
- Host country: Greece
- Dates: July 16–29
- Teams: 16 (from 49 federations)
- Venues: 2 (in 2 host cities)

Final positions
- Champions: Greece (2nd title)

Tournament statistics
- MVP: (Greece) Kostas Papanikolaou
- Top scorer: (Germany) Benzing (22.2)
- Top rebounds: (Montenegro) Vučević (10.8)
- Top assists: (Russia) Khvostov (6.1)
- PPG (Team): Lithuania (80.4)
- RPG (Team): France (39.1)
- APG (Team): Russia (14.4)

Official website
- Official website (archive)

The 2009 FIBA Europe Under-20 Championship was the 12th edition of the FIBA Europe Under-20 Championship. The cities of Rhodes and Ialysos, in Greece, hosted the tournament. Greece won their second title.

Israel and Belgium were relegated to Division B.

== Teams ==
- Belgium
- Croatia
- France
- Germany
- Greece
- Israel
- Italy
- Latvia
- Lithuania
- Montenegro
- Russia
- Serbia
- Slovenia
- Spain
- Turkey
- Ukraine

== Venues ==
City	Arena	Capacity
Rhodes	Venetokleio Sports Hall	1,300
Ialysos	Ialysos Sports Hall	800

== Preliminary round ==
Qualified for the qualifying round

=== Group A ===
Team	Pts.	W	L	PF	PA	Diff
Spain	6	3	0	246	209	37
Russia	5	2	1	206	201	5
Latvia	4	1	2	221	227	−5
Slovenia	3	0	3	212	248	−36

July 16
14:30

Spain	84–72	Russia
Scoring by quarter: 20–23, 15–17, 17–20, 32–20

Venetokleio Sports Hall, Rhodes

July 16
16:45

Latvia	93–86 (OT)	Slovenia
Scoring by quarter: 26–17, 10–28, 25–21, 20–15, Overtime: 12–5

Venetokleio Sports Hall, Rhodes

July 17
14:30

Russia	68–62	Latvia
Scoring by quarter: 18–13, 12–15, 24–16, 14–18

Ialysos Sports Hall, Ialysos

July 17
16:45

Slovenia	71–89	Spain
Scoring by quarter: 22–24, 18–19, 19–23, 12–23

Ialysos Sports Hall, Ialysos

July 18
14:30

Spain	73–66	Latvia
Scoring by quarter: 23–18, 21–17, 14–15, 15–16

Venetokleio Sports Hall, Rhodes

July 18
16:45

Slovenia	55–66	Russia
Scoring by quarter: 21–19, 6–23, 12–11, 16–13

Venetokleio Sports Hall, Rhodes

=== Group B ===
Team	Pts.	W	L	PF	PA	Diff
France	6	3	0	233	198	35
Greece	5	2	1	230	205	25
Italy	4	1	2	219	231	−12
Belgium	3	0	3	197	245	−48

July 16
19:00

Greece	80–58	Belgium
Scoring by quarter: 21–15, 22–14, 18–17, 19–12

Venetokleio Sports Hall, Rhodes

July 16
21:15

France	74–66	Italy
Scoring by quarter: 23–17, 24–21, 12–16, 15–12

Venetokleio Sports Hall, Rhodes

July 17
19:00

Italy	66–79	Greece
Scoring by quarter: 21–22, 18–21, 13–13, 14–23

Ialysos Sports Hall, Ialysos

July 17
21:15

Belgium	61–78	France
Scoring by quarter: 11–13, 16–23, 22–20, 12–22

Ialysos Sports Hall, Ialysos

July 18
19:00

France	81–71	Greece
Scoring by quarter: 22–17, 13–14, 15–19, 31–21

Venetokleio Sports Hall, Rhodes

July 18
21:15

Belgium	78–87	Italy
Scoring by quarter: 19–26, 16–21, 12–18, 31–22

Venetokleio Sports Hall, Rhodes

=== Group C ===
Team	Pts.	W	L	PF	PA	Diff
Lithuania	6	3	0	256	198	58
Montenegro	5	2	1	198	181	17
Turkey	4	1	2	193	201	−8
Israel	3	0	3	193	260	−67

July 16
14:30

Turkey	76–75	Israel
Scoring by quarter: 15–14, 15-24, 25–15, 13–15

Ialysos Sports Hall, Ialysos

July 16
16:45

Lithuania	73–71	Montenegro
Scoring by quarter: 15–13, 20–18, 18–20, 20–20

Ialysos Sports Hall, Ialysos

July 17
14:30

Montenegro	61–58	Turkey
Scoring by quarter: 21–19, 19–13, 10–14, 11–12

Venetokleio Sports Hall, Rhodes

July 17
16:45

Israel	68–118	Lithuania
Scoring by quarter: 12–36, 17–17, 21–28, 18–27

Venetokleio Sports Hall, Rhodes

July 18
14:30

Montenegro	66–50	Israel
Scoring by quarter: 17–12, 15–8, 13–13, 21–17

Ialysos Sports Hall, Ialysos

July 18
16:45

Turkey	59–65	Lithuania
Scoring by quarter: 19–18, 18–15, 9–21, 13–11

Ialysos Sports Hall, Ialysos

=== Group D ===
Team	Pts.	W	L	PF	PA	Diff
Croatia	5	2	1	252	246	6
Ukraine	5	2	1	218	216	2
Serbia	4	1	2	215	229	−14
Germany	4	1	2	238	232	6

July 16
19:00

Croatia	91–86	Germany
Scoring by quarter: 13–24, 26–14, 16–21, 22–18

Ialysos Sports Hall, Ialysos

July 16
21:15

Serbia	62–70	Ukraine
Scoring by quarter: 14–19, 9–17, 16–18, 23–16

Ialysos Sports Hall, Ialysos

July 17
19:00

Ukraine	86–79	Croatia
Scoring by quarter: 22–18, 22–28, 18–21, 24–12

Venetokleio Sports Hall, Rhodes

July 17
21:15

Germany	77–79	Serbia
Scoring by quarter: 11–21, 17–19, 17–12, 32–27

Venetokleio Sports Hall, Rhodes

July 18
19:00

Ukraine	62–75	Germany
Scoring by quarter: 21–22, 19–23, 9–19, 13–11

Ialysos Sports Hall, Ialysos

July 18
21:15

Croatia	82–74	Serbia
Scoring by quarter: 19–16, 20–29, 23–13, 20–16

Ialysos Sports Hall, Ialysos

== Qualifying round ==
Qualified for the quarter-finals

=== Group E ===
Team	Pts.	W	L	PF	PA	Diff
Spain	9	4	1	370	344	26
France	9	4	1	396	363	33
Greece	9	4	1	370	356	14
Italy	6	1	4	336	355	−19
Latvia	6	1	4	362	379	−17
Russia	6	1	4	330	367	−37

July 20
16:45

Latvia	82–84	France
Scoring by quarter: 23–19, 18–22, 13–16, 28–27

Venetokleio Sports Hall, Rhodes

July 20
19:00

Italy	60–62	Spain
Scoring by quarter: 12–18, 12–13, 18–19, 18–12

Venetokleio Sports Hall, Rhodes

July 20
21:15

Greece	73–71	Russia
Scoring by quarter: 23–22, 11–14, 26–18, 13–17

Venetokleio Sports Hall, Rhodes

July 21
16:45

Italy	77–81	Latvia
Scoring by quarter: 14–23, 18–29, 20–12, 25–17

Ialysos Sports Hall, Ialysos

July 21
19:00

Spain	67–70	Greece
Scoring by quarter: 13–20, 18–20, 19–12, 17–18

Ialysos Sports Hall, Ialysos

July 21
21:15

Russia	60–81	France
Scoring by quarter: 13–26, 16–21, 17–15, 14–19

Ialysos Sports Hall, Ialysos

July 22
16:45

France	76–84	Spain
Scoring by quarter: 18–24, 14–20, 19–18, 25–22

Venetokleio Sports Hall, Rhodes

July 22
19:00

Greece	77–71	Latvia
Scoring by quarter: 20–8, 19–24, 21–19, 17–20

Venetokleio Sports Hall, Rhodes

July 22
21:15

Russia	59–67	Italy
Scoring by quarter: 14–19, 15–15, 13–21, 17–12

Venetokleio Sports Hall, Rhodes

=== Group F ===
Team	Pts.	W	L	PF	PA	Diff
Lithuania	9	4	1	381	340	41
Croatia	8	3	2	395	385	10
Montenegro	8	3	2	347	337	10
Turkey	7	2	3	335	297	38
Ukraine	7	2	3	311	389	−48
Serbia	6	1	4	334	355	−21

July 20
16:45

Serbia	76–67	Lithuania
Scoring by quarter: 24–14, 20–13, 17–19, 15–21

Ialysos Sports Hall, Ialysos

July 20
19:00

Croatia	76–70	Montenegro
Scoring by quarter: 15–22, 18–13, 22–17, 21–18

Ialysos Sports Hall, Ialysos

July 20
21:15

Turkey	93–44	Ukraine
Scoring by quarter: 27–7, 24–14, 18–10, 24–13

Ialysos Sports Hall, Ialysos

July 21
16:45

Lithuania	93–83	Croatia
Scoring by quarter: 24–31, 26–16, 19–24, 24–12

Venetokleio Sports Hall, Rhodes

July 21
19:00

Serbia	52–63	Turkey
Scoring by quarter: 6–28, 9–9, 19–12, 18–14

Venetokleio Sports Hall, Rhodes

July 21
21:15

Montenegro	72–60	Ukraine
Scoring by quarter: 23–13, 11–19, 17–10, 21–18

Venetokleio Sports Hall, Rhodes

July 22
16:45

Croatia	75–62	Turkey
Scoring by quarter: 12–16, 23–10, 19–22, 21–14

Ialysos Sports Hall, Ialysos

July 22
19:00

Ukraine	83–51	Lithuania
Scoring by quarter: 19–10, 23–17, 23–11, 18–13

Ialysos Sports Hall, Ialysos

July 22
21:15

Montenegro	73–70	Serbia
Scoring by quarter: 18–17, 17–11, 10–19, 16–14

Ialysos Sports Hall, Ialysos

== Knockout stage ==
=== Championship bracket ===
Quarter-finals
July 24
Spain	77
Turkey	60
July 24
Croatia	68
Greece	77
July 24
Lithuania	68
Italy	69
July 24
France	68
Montenegro	47

Semi-finals
July 25
Spain	76
Greece	87
July 25
Italy	68
France	94

Final
July 26
Greece	90
France	85
Third place
July 26
Spain	75
Italy	72

=== 5th place bracket ===
Semi-finals
July 25
Turkey	78
Croatia	69
July 25
Lithuania	80
Montenegro	72

Fifth place
July 26
Turkey	72
Lithuania	77
Seventh place
July 26
Croatia	76
Montenegro	77

=== 9th place bracket ===
Semi-finals
July 24
Latvia	74
Serbia	67
July 24
Ukraine	54
Russia	65

ninth place
July 26
Latvia	66
Russia	89
eleventh place
July 26
Serbia	83
Ukraine	56

=== 13th place group ===
Team	Pts.	W	L	PF	PA	Diff
Slovenia	6	3	0	250	207	43
Germany	5	2	1	237	211	26
Israel	4	1	2	227	231	−4
Belgium	3	0	3	191	256	−65

July 20
14:30

Slovenia	86–77	Germany
Scoring by quarter: 15–17, 18–18, 31–20, 22–22

Venetokleio Sports Hall, Rhodes

July 20
14:30

Belgium	71–92	Israel
Scoring by quarter: 27–23, 11–23, 18–25, 15–21

Ialysos Sports Hall, Ialysos

July 22
14:30

Israel	63–85	Slovenia
Scoring by quarter: 15–21, 18–19, 10–23, 20–22

Venetokleio Sports Hall, Rhodes

July 22
14:30

Germany	85–53	Belgium
Scoring by quarter: 17–17, 17–14, 30–13, 21–9

Ialysos Sports Hall, Ialysos

July 24
14:30

Slovenia	79–67	Belgium
Scoring by quarter: 24–17, 17–17, 21–13, 17–20

Ialysos Sports Hall, Ialysos

July 24
16:45

Israel	72–75	Germany

Ialysos Sports Hall, Ialysos

== Quarter Final Round ==
July 24
14:30

Game 49

Spain	77–60	Turkey
Scoring by quarter: 25–12, 20–19, 13–16, 19–13

Venetokleio Sports Hall, Rhodes

July 24
16:45

Game 50

France	68–47	Montenegro
Scoring by quarter: 17–14, 18–10, 18–15, 15–8

Venetokleio Sports Hall, Rhodes

July 24
19:00

Game 52

Croatia	68–77	Greece
Scoring by quarter: 21–20, 12–15, 13–20, 22–22

Venetokleio Sports Hall, Rhodes

July 24
21:15

Game 51

Lithuania	68–69	Italy
Scoring by quarter: 25–18, 11–13, 25–16, 7–22

Venetokleio Sports Hall, Rhodes

=== Classification round for 9th to 12th place ===
July 24
19:00

Game 53

Latvia	74–67	Serbia
Scoring by quarter: 23–12, 16–12, 22–22, 13–21

Ialysos Sports Hall, Ialysos

July 24
21:15

Game 54

Ukraine	54–65	Russia
Scoring by quarter: 19–16, 12–17, 11–19, 12–13

Ialysos Sports Hall, Ialysos

== Semi-finals ==
=== Classification round for 5th to 8th place ===
July 25
14:30

Game 55

Turkey	78–69	Croatia
Scoring by quarter: 17–18, 16–17, 22–12, 23–22

Venetokleio Sports Hall, Rhodes

July 25
16:45

Game 56

Lithuania	80–72	Montenegro
Scoring by quarter: 21–24, 24–19, 10–18, 25–11

Venetokleio Sports Hall, Rhodes

=== Semi-finals ===
July 25
19:00

Game 57

Spain	76–87	Greece
Scoring by quarter: 19–11, 20–20, 20–30, 17–26

Venetokleio Sports Hall, Rhodes

July 25
21:15

Game 58

Italy	68–94	France
Scoring by quarter: 14–26, 25–19, 13–22, 16–27

Venetokleio Sports Hall, Rhodes

== Finals ==
July 26
13:15

11th Place

Serbia	83–56	Ukraine
Scoring by quarter: 20–18, 23–2, 17–23, 23–13

Ialysos Sports Hall, Ialysos

July 26
15:30

9th Place

Latvia	66–89	Russia
Scoring by quarter: 19–20, 12–29, 13–17, 22–23

Ialysos Sports Hall, Ialysos

July 26
13:15

7th Place

Croatia	76–77	Montenegro
Scoring by quarter: 16–18, 21–19, 22–17, 17–23

Venetokleio Sports Hall, Rhodes

July 26
15:45

5th Place

Turkey	72–77	Lithuania
Scoring by quarter: 21–10, 14–16, 24–18, 13–33

Venetokleio Sports Hall, Rhodes

July 26
18:15

Third Place

Spain	75–72	Italy
Scoring by quarter: 20–18, 25–10, 17–26, 13–18

Venetokleio Sports Hall, Rhodes

July 26
21:00

Final

Greece	90–85	France
Scoring by quarter: 22–16, 23–23, 19–22, 26–24

Venetokleio Sports Hall, Rhodes
Referees: Volodymyr Drabikovskyi (UKR), Zoran Sutulovic (MNE), Petar Obradovic (BIH)

== Final standings ==
Rank	Team
1st place, gold medalist(s)	Greece
2nd place, silver medalist(s)	France
3rd place, bronze medalist(s)	Spain
4th	Italy
5th	Lithuania
6th	Turkey
7th	Montenegro
8th	Croatia
9th	Russia
10th	Latvia
11th	Serbia
12th	Ukraine
13th	Slovenia
14th	Germany
15th	Israel
16th	Belgium

== Awards ==
2009 Under-20 European Championship winner

Greece
Second title

Most Valuable Player
(Greece) Kostas Papanikolaou

All-Tournament Team

- (France) Antoine Diot
- (Greece) Kostas Papanikolaou
- (France) Kevin Seraphin
- (Montenegro) Nikola Vučević
- (Spain) Xavier Rabaseda

== Stats leaders ==
=== Points ===
Rank	Name	Points	Games	PPG
1.	(Germany) Robin Benzing	111	5	22.2
2.	(Montenegro) Sead Šehović	158	9	17.6
3.	(Croatia) Bojan Bogdanović	156	9	17.3
3.	(Slovenia) Zoran Dragić	98	6	16.3
5.	(Latvia) Dairis Bertāns	130	8	16.3

=== Rebounds ===
Rank	Name	Points	Games	RPG
1.	(Montenegro) Nikola Vučević	86	8	10.8
2.	(Russia) Vladimir Ivlev	81	8	10.1
3.	(Latvia) Lauris Blaus	72	8	9.0
4.	(Spain) Pere Tomàs	75	9	8.3
5.	(France) Fernando Raposo	75	9	8.3

=== Assists ===
Rank	Name	Points	Games	RPG
1.	(Russia) Dmitri Khvostov	49	8	6.1
2.	(France) Antoine Diot	47	9	5.2
3.	(Belgium) Jorn Steinbach	29	6	4.8
4.	(Montenegro) Sead Šehović	36	9	4.0
5.	(Greece) Kostas Sloukas	35	9	3.9
