= Montenegro men's national under-20 basketball team =

Balkan national youth sports team

Montenegro
- FIBA zone: FIBA Europe
- National federation: Basketball Federation of Montenegro

U20 EuroBasket
- Appearances: 13
- Medals: Bronze: 1 (2022)

U20 EuroBasket Division B
- Appearances: 4
- Medals: Gold: 2 (2007, 2016)

The Montenegro men's national under-20 basketball team is a national basketball team of Montenegro, administered by the Basketball Federation of Montenegro. It represents the country in international under-20 men's basketball competitions.

== FIBA U20 EuroBasket participations ==
Year	Division A	Division B
2007		1st place, gold medalist(s)
2008	5th	
2009	7th	
2010	6th	
2011	7th	
2012	14th	
2013	8th	
2014	18th	
2015		4th

Year	Division A	Division B
2016		1st place, gold medalist(s)
2017	11th	
2018	11th	
2019	12th	
2022	3rd place, bronze medalist(s)	
2023	13th	
2024	16th	
2025		12th

== See also ==
- Montenegro men's national basketball team
- Montenegro men's national under-18 basketball team
- Montenegro women's national under-20 basketball team
