= Belarus men's national under-20 basketball team =

Belarus
- FIBA zone: FIBA Europe
- National federation: Belarusian Basketball Federation

U20 EuroBasket
- Appearances: 5
- Medals: Gold: 1 (1994)

U20 EuroBasketDivision B
- Appearances: 10
- Medals: None

The Belarus men's national under-20 basketball team is a national basketball team of Belarus, administered by the Belarusian Basketball Federation. It represented the country in international men's under-20 basketball competitions.

After the 2022 Russian invasion of Ukraine, the FIBA suspended Belarus from participating in basketball and 3x3 basketball competitions.

== FIBA U20 EuroBasket participations ==
Year	Division A	Division B
1994	1st place, gold medalist(s)	
1996	10th	
2004	9th	
2005	14th	
2006	16th	
2007		18th
2010		17th
2011		17th

Year	Division A	Division B
2012		13th
2014		4th
2015		5th
2016		13th
2017		15th
2018		11th
2019		13th

== See also ==
- Belarus men's national basketball team
- Belarus men's national under-18 basketball team
- Belarus women's national under-20 basketball team
