= Ukraine men's national under-20 basketball team =

National basketball team of Ukraine

Ukraine
- FIBA zone: FIBA Europe
- National federation: Basketball Federation of Ukraine

U20 EuroBasket
- Appearances: 16
- Medals: None

U20 EuroBasket Division B
- Appearances: 6
- Medals: Gold: 1 (2026); Silver: 2 (2007, 2024); Bronze: 2 (2014, 2023)

The Ukraine men's national under-20 basketball team is a national basketball team of Ukraine, administered by the Basketball Federation of Ukraine. It represents the country in international under-20 men's basketball competitions.

== FIBA U20 EuroBasket participations ==
Year	Division A	Division B
2002	12th	
2004	10th	
2005	15th	
2006		7th
2007		2nd place, silver medalist(s)
2008	8th	
2009	12th	
2010	8th	
2011	10th	
2012	12th	
2013	18th	

Year	Division A	Division B
2014		3rd place, bronze medalist(s)
2015	12th	
2016	8th	
2017	10th	
2018	12th	
2019	10th	
2022	16th	
2023		3rd place, bronze medalist(s)
2024		2nd place, silver medalist(s)
2025	16th	
2026		1st place, gold medalist(s)

== See also ==
- Ukraine men's national basketball team
- Ukraine men's national under-18 basketball team
- Ukraine women's national under-20 basketball team
