= Germany men's national under-20 basketball team =

German youth basketball team

Germany
- FIBA zone: FIBA Europe
- National federation: German Basketball Federation

U20 EuroBasket
- Appearances: 21
- Medals: Bronze: 2 (2018, 2019)

U20 EuroBasket Division B
- Appearances: 2
- Medals: Gold: 1 (2008)
Medal record
Stanković Cup
Gold medal – first place	2017 Shenzhen
Summer Universiade
Silver medal – second place	2015 Gwangju
Bronze medal – third place	1989 Duisburg

The Germany men's national under-20 basketball team is a national basketball team of Germany, administered by the German Basketball Federation. It represents the country in international under-20 men's basketball competitions.

== FIBA U20 EuroBasket participations ==
Year	Division A	Division B
1992	12th	
1994	9th	
1998	7th	
2005	13th	
2006	15th	
2007		4th
2008		1st place, gold medalist(s)
2009	14th	
2010	14th	
2011	5th	
2012	5th	
2013	11th	

Year	Division A	Division B
2014	14th	
2015	11th	
2016	4th	
2017	7th	
2018	3rd place, bronze medalist(s)	
2019	3rd place, bronze medalist(s)	
2022	11th	
2023	6th	
2024	12th	
2025	13th	
2026	8th	

== See also ==
- Germany men's national basketball team
- Germany men's national under-19 basketball team
- Germany women's national under-20 basketball team
