= 2026 FIBA U20 EuroBasket Division B =

International youth basketball tournament

Tournament details
- Host country: Slovakia
- City: Bratislava
- Dates: 10–19 July 2026
- Teams: 21 (from 1 confederation)
- Venues: 2 (in 1 host city)

Final positions
- Champions: Ukraine (1st title)
- Runners-up: Iceland
- Third place: Sweden

Tournament statistics
- Games played: 75
- MVP: (Ukraine) Yehor Sushkin
- Top scorer: (Ukraine) Yehor Sushkin (18.9 ppg)

Official website
- www.fiba.basketball

The 2026 FIBA U20 EuroBasket Division B was the 20th edition of the Division B of the European basketball championship for men's under-20 national teams. The tournament was played in Bratislava, Slovakia, from 10 to 19 July 2026.

Ukraine secured their first Division B title with a victory over Iceland in the final, 74–64.

== Participating teams ==
- Albania
- Armenia
- Azerbaijan
- Bosnia and Herzegovina
- Bulgaria
- Cyprus
- Denmark
- Estonia
- Georgia
- Hungary
- Iceland ▼ (14th place, 2025 FIBA U20 EuroBasket Division A)
- Ireland
- Kosovo
- Luxembourg
- Netherlands
- North Macedonia
- Portugal
- Slovakia
- Sweden
- Switzerland
- Ukraine ▼ (16th place, 2025 FIBA U20 EuroBasket Division A)

== First round ==
The draw of the first round was held on 5 February 2026 in Freising, Germany.

In the first round, the teams were drawn into four groups. The first two teams from each group advanced to the quarterfinals; the third and fourth teams advanced to the 9th–16th place playoffs; the other teams were dropped to the 17th–21st place classification.

All times are local (Central European Summer Time; UTC+2).

=== Group A ===
Pos	Team	Pld	W	L	PF	PA	PD	Pts	Qualification
1	Sweden	4	4	0	344	250	+94	8	Quarterfinals
2	Ireland	4	3	1	267	242	+25	7	Quarterfinals
3	North Macedonia	4	2	2	258	275	−17	6	9th–16th place playoffs
4	Azerbaijan	4	1	3	234	272	−38	5	9th–16th place playoffs
5	Slovakia (H)	4	0	4	248	312	−64	4	17th–21st place classification

Source: FIBA
(H) Hosts

10 July 2026
16:00

Boxscore

Sweden	85–58	Azerbaijan
Scoring by quarter: 21–10, 18-14, 17–15, 29–19
Pts: Nzoyansi 19; Rebs: Fontin 9 Asts: Jennlinger 3		Pts: Berkoz 14; Rebs: Agbason 12; Asts: Berkoz 2

EUBA Sports Hall
Attendance: 38
Referees: Ilias Karpanos (Greece), Ivan Iliev (Bulgaria), Kyriacos Christou (Cyprus)

10 July 2026
18:00

Boxscore

North Macedonia	71–63	Slovakia
Scoring by quarter: 15–17, 26–11, 13–18, 17–17
Pts: Kjirilovski 15; Rebs: Lukanoski 9 Asts: three players 3		Pts: Stanko 15; Rebs: Ázacis, Pospíšil 7 Asts: Pospíšil 4

Gopass Arena
Referees: Alfonso Olivares (Spain), Paweł Pacek (Poland), Bjarki Þór Davíðsson (Iceland)

11 July 2026
13:30

Boxscore

Ireland	69–56	North Macedonia
Scoring by quarter: 20–13, 11–14, 17–5, 21–24
Pts: Okojie 24; Rebs: Okojie 10; Asts: Scully 4		Pts: Kjirilovski 17; Rebs: Buttemere 8 Asts: Mladenovski 10

EUBA Sports Hall
Attendance: 55
Referees: Zafer Yılmaz (Turkey), Raimonds Repelis (Latvia), Kyriacos Christou (Cyprus)

11 July 2026
18:00

Boxscore

Slovakia	70–83	Sweden
Scoring by quarter: 16–33, 28–21, 16–15, 10–14
Pts: Chlupis 20; Rebs: Stanko 11; Asts: Pospíšil 4		Pts: Fadiga 19; Rebs: Hassler 8 Asts: Fadiga 7

Gopass Arena
Attendance: 450
Referees: Vladimir Zanev (Bulgaria), Oleksandr Oparin (Ukraine), Hugo Silva (Portugal)

12 July 2026
13:30

Boxscore

Sweden	90–58	Ireland
Scoring by quarter: 21–21, 18–7, 27–17, 24–13
Pts: Nzoyansi 15; Rebs: Obenjo 10; Asts: Nzoyansi 7		Pts: Scully 21; Rebs: Okojie 9 Asts: Scully 4

EUBA Sports Hall
Attendance: 67
Referees: Alfonso Olivares (Spain), Daniel Papaz (Bosnia and Herzegovina), Bjarki Þór Davíðsson (Iceland)

12 July 2026
18:00

Boxscore

Azerbaijan	72–66	Slovakia
Scoring by quarter: 13–9, 20–27, 17–16, 22–14
Pts: Agbason 26; Rebs: Agbason 16; Asts: Mammadov 4		Pts: Stanko 18; Rebs: Stanko 11; Asts: Jendrichovský 5

Gopass Arena
Attendance: 412
Referees: Zafer Yılmaz (Turkey), Josh Bowe (Great Britain), Ivo Kitsing (Estonia)

14 July 2026
13:30

Boxscore

North Macedonia	64–86	Sweden
Scoring by quarter: 16–23, 16–22, 12–27, 20–14
Pts: Lukanoski 15; Rebs: Lukanoski 13; Asts: Buttemere 4		Pts: three players 11; Rebs: Hassler 7 Asts: four players 3

EUBA Sports Hall
Attendance: 43
Referees: Montis Rozenfelds ((Latvia), Kyriacos Christou (Cyprus), Ivan Iliev (Bulgria)

14 July 2026
20:30

Boxscore

Ireland	54–47	Azerbaijan
Scoring by quarter: 15–5, 18–12, 14–14, 7–16
Pts: Okojie 14; Rebs: Okojie 17; Asts: Igbokwe 4		Pts: Mammadov 10; Rebs: Agbason 14; Asts: Berkoz 4

Gopass Arena
Attendance: 84
Referees: Kirile Tvauri (Georgia), Hugo Silva (Portugal), Xhelal Mumini (Kosovo)

15 July 2026
18:00

Boxscore

Slovakia	49–86	Ireland
Scoring by quarter: 6–19, 5–18, 21–20, 17–29
Pts: Pospíšil 20; Rebs: Stanko 9 Asts: Azacis 4		Pts: Charles 14; Rebs: Charles 9 Asts: three players 3

Gopass Arena
Attendance: 407

15 July 2026
21:00

Boxscore

Azerbaijan	57–67	North Macedonia
Scoring by quarter: 25–16, 7–9, 17–27, 8–15
Pts: Agbason, Berkoz 12; Rebs: Agbason 18; Asts: Berkoz 6		Pts: Kjirilovski 16; Rebs: Lukanoski 14; Asts: Mladenovski 5

EUBA Sports Hall
Attendance: 25

=== Group B ===
Pos	Team	Pld	W	L	PF	PA	PD	Pts	Qualification
1	Ukraine	4	4	0	318	282	+36	8	Quarterfinals
2	Luxembourg	4	3	1	284	274	+10	7	Quarterfinals
3	Switzerland	4	1	3	283	281	+2	5	9th–16th place playoffs
4	Georgia	4	1	3	287	318	−31	5	9th–16th place playoffs
5	Estonia	4	1	3	299	316	−17	5	17th–21st place classification

Source: FIBA

10 July 2026
15:30

Boxscore

Switzerland	64–69	Luxembourg
Scoring by quarter: 12–27, 22–11, 18–15, 12–16
Pts: Aadan 18; Rebs: Sassella 6 Asts: Sassella 3		Pts: Oth 15; Rebs: de Sousa Silva 10; Asts: Grosber 7

Gopass Arena
Attendance: 68
Referees: Viktor Nagy (Hungary), Daniel Papaz (Bosnia and Herzegovina), Hugo Silva (Portugal)

10 July 2026
20:30

Boxscore

Ukraine	77–64	Georgia
Scoring by quarter: 21–14, 22–21, 16–17, 18–12
Pts: Hryshchuk 18; Rebs: Yiamu 11; Asts: Sushkin 7		Pts: Kotliarevsky 16; Rebs: Aroshidze 11; Asts: Kotliarevsky 4

Gopass Arena
Attendance: 86
Referees: Zoran Mitrovski (North Macedonia), Teo Miletić (Croatia), Davit Kikhyan (Armenia)

11 July 2026
16:00

Boxscore

Estonia	81–87	Ukraine
Scoring by quarter: 18–21, 17–22, 16–17, 30–27
Pts: Suurorg 18; Rebs: Suvi 6 Asts: Rumm 3		Pts: Yiamu 23; Rebs: Yiamu 19; Asts: Sushkin 7

EUBA Sports Hall
Attendance: 70
Referees: Nikolaos Tziopanos (Greece), Blazo Begenisic (Sweden), Milan Sibinović (Serbia)

11 July 2026
18:30

Boxscore

Georgia	70–83	Switzerland
Scoring by quarter: 20–20, 15–21, 22–15, 13–27
Pts: Aroshidze 18; Rebs: Tchirakazde 10; Asts: Tchirakazde 5		Pts: Sassella 17; Rebs: Aleksic, Kupa 8 Asts: Da Silva 5

EUBA Sports Hall
Attendance: 42
Referees: Zdenko Tomašovič (Slovakia), Josh Bowe (Great Britain), Xhelal Mumini (Kosovo)

12 July 2026
13:00

Boxscore

Luxembourg	77–61	Georgia
Scoring by quarter: 24–24, 13–8, 22–12, 18–17
Pts: Jungers 32; Rebs: Grosber 14; Asts: Grosber, de Sousa Silva 4		Pts: Abuladze 17; Rebs: Dokhnadze 11; Asts: Abuladze 6

Gopass Arena
Attendance: 32
Referees: Zoran Mitrovski (North Macedonia), Blazo Begenisic (Sweden), Kyriacos Christou (Cyprus)

12 July 2026
15:30

Boxscore

Switzerland	64–68	Estonia
Scoring by quarter: 19–16, 20–13, 7–28, 18–11
Pts: Kupa 18; Rebs: Glenewinkel 12; Asts: Aadan 4		Pts: Hermet 13; Rebs: Suvi 6 Asts: Lepp 7

Gopass Arena
Attendance: 72
Referees: Viktor Nagy (Hungary), Teo Miletić (Croatia), Davit Kikhyan (Armenia)

14 July 2026
11:00

Boxscore

Estonia	69–73	Luxembourg
Scoring by quarter: 13–15, 13–26, 16–19, 27–13
Pts: Alles 30; Rebs: Mae, Binis 8 Asts: Lepp 3		Pts: Mc Swain 19; Rebs: Grosber 13; Asts: Grosber 3

EUBA Sports Hall
Attendance: 27
Referees: Vladimir Zanev (Bulgaria), Daniel Papaz (Bosnia and Herzegovina), Bjarki Þór Davíðsson (Iceland)

14 July 2026
13:00

Boxscore

Ukraine	74–72	Switzerland
Scoring by quarter: 22–18, 21–10, 13–28, 18–16
Pts: Sushkin 21; Rebs: Hryshchuk 9 Asts: Yiamu 4		Pts: Kupa, Sassella 20; Rebs: Aadan 7 Asts: Aadan 3

Gopass Arena
Attendance: 69
Referees: Zdenko Tomašovič (Slovakia), Blazo Begenisic (Sweden), Milan Sibinović (Serbia)

15 July 2026
13:30

Boxscore

Georgia	92–81	Estonia
Scoring by quarter: 22–25, 28–24, 19–15, 23–17
Pts: Aroshidze 25; Rebs: Aroshidze 10; Asts: Kotliarevsky 6		Pts: Alles 20; Rebs: Rannaste, Suvi 6 Asts: Lepp 6

EUBA Sports Hall
Attendance: 22

15 July 2026
18:30

Boxscore

Luxembourg	65–80	Ukraine
Scoring by quarter: 16–20, 15–18, 15–23, 19–19
Pts: Jungers, McSwain 13; Rebs: McSwain 10; Asts: Stoffel, Grosber 5		Pts: Sushkin 22; Rebs: Hryshchuk 8 Asts: Sushkin 8

EUBA Sports Hall
Attendance: 74

=== Group C ===
Pos	Team	Pld	W	L	PF	PA	PD	Pts	Qualification
1	Portugal	5	4	1	417	269	+148	9	Quarterfinals
2	Iceland	5	4	1	428	351	+77	9	Quarterfinals
3	Bosnia and Herzegovina	5	4	1	396	334	+62	9	9th–16th place playoffs
4	Cyprus	5	2	3	310	347	−37	7	9th–16th place playoffs
5	Kosovo	5	1	4	328	380	−52	6	17th–21st place classification
6	Armenia	5	0	5	277	475	−198	5	17th–21st place classification

Source: FIBA

10 July 2026
11:00

Boxscore

Bosnia and Herzegovina	69–84	Portugal
Scoring by quarter: 16–22, 21–27, 20–15, 12–20
Pts: Hrelja 18; Rebs: Hrelja 7 Asts: Kuridza 4		Pts: Andrade 20; Rebs: Panzo 8 Asts: Caetano 4

EUBA Sports Hall
Referees: Kirile Tvauri (Georgia), Raimonds Repelis (Latvia), Urfan Bayramli (Azerbaijan)

10 July 2026
13:00

Boxscore

Cyprus	60–59	Kosovo
Scoring by quarter: 23–17, 13–13, 10–18, 14–11
Pts: Oztoprak 13; Rebs: Oztoprak 9 Asts: Georgiou 3		Pts: Rrahmani 20; Rebs: Rrahmani 13; Asts: Hasanaj 4

Gopass Arena
Attendance: 56
Referees: Montis Rozenfelds (Latvia), Josh Bowe (Great Britain), Martin Demierre (Switzerland)

10 July 2026
13:30

Boxscore

Armenia	63–97	Iceland
Scoring by quarter: 13–19, 22–12, 6–32, 22–34
Pts: Karibyan 16; Rebs: Sanamian 7 Asts: Bruce 6		Pts: Lúðvíksson 21; Rebs: Lúðvíksson 19; Asts: Björgvinsson 7

EUBA Sports Hall
Referees: Vladimir Zanev (Bulgaria), Michal Kuzia (Poland), Julien Malane (Luxembourg)

11 July 2026
11:00

Boxscore

Iceland	83–57	Cyprus
Scoring by quarter: 24–4, 15–20, 21–16, 23–17
Pts: Lúðvíksson 18; Rebs: Lúðvíksson 11; Asts: Lúðvíksson 6		Pts: Mannaris 9 Rebs: Kouzapas 9 Asts: Constantinou 5

EUBA Sports Hall
Attendance: 50
Referees: Viktor Nagy (Hungary), Ivan Iliev (Bulgarian), Urfan Bayramli (Azerbaijan)

11 July 2026
13:00

Boxscore

Portugal	112–32	Armenia
Scoring by quarter: 22–9, 36–8, 32–9, 22–6
Pts: Andrade 20; Rebs: Ferreira, Cherepenko 8 Asts: Panzo 6		Pts: Dayian 9 Rebs: Sanamian, Vardanyan 5 Asts: five players 1

Gopass Arena
Attendance: 52
Referees: Montis Rozenfelds (Latvia), Paweł Pacek (Poland), Martin Demierre (Switzerland)

11 July 2026
21:00

Boxscore

Kosovo	65–81	Bosnia and Herzegovina
Scoring by quarter: 20–20, 20–19, 9–32, 16–10
Pts: Istrefi 14; Rebs: Istrefi 9 Asts: Ahmeti 5		Pts: Kuridza 14; Rebs: Hrelja 12; Asts: Klejštan 6

EUBA Sports Hall
Attendance: 24
Referees: Alfonso Olivares (Spain), Martin Kučírek (Czech Republic), Ivo Kitsing (Estonia)

12 July 2026
11:00

Boxscore

Cyprus	54–73	Portugal
Scoring by quarter: 4–23, 13–14, 16–12, 21–24
Pts: Karagiannis 13; Rebs: Marnelos 8 Asts: Koutouris 4		Pts: Carrera 16; Rebs: Panzo 7 Asts: Caetano, Panzo 4

EUBA Sports Hall
Attendance: 50
Referees: Kirile Tvauri (Georgia), Michał Kuzia (Poland), Milan Sibinović (Serbia)

12 July 2026
20:30

Boxscore

Armenia	57–92	Bosnia and Herzegovina
Scoring by quarter: 15–32, 11–16, 16–20, 15–24
Pts: Dayian 22; Rebs: Karibyan 9 Asts: Dayian 3		Pts: Mandžukić 25; Rebs: Hrelja 12; Asts: Hrelja 11

Gopass Arena
Attendance: 49
Referees: Nikolaos Tziopanos (Greece), Ivan Iliev (Bulgaria), Julien Malane (Luxembourg)

12 July 2026
21:00

Boxscore

Iceland	96–79	Kosovo
Scoring by quarter: 23–23, 25–18, 14–19, 34–19
Pts: Halldórsson 23; Rebs: Lúðvíksson 18; Asts: Björgvinsson 5		Pts: Bedra 20; Rebs: Istrefi 8 Asts: Bedra 5

EUBA Sports Hall
Attendance: 36
Referees: Montis Rozenfelds (Latvia), Raimonds Repelis (Latvia), Martin Demierre (Switzerland)

14 July 2026
15:30

Boxscore

Bosnia and Herzegovina	74–51	Cyprus
Scoring by quarter: 13–11, 25–6, 10–17, 26–17
Pts: Hrelja 16; Rebs: Hrelja 15; Asts: Hrelja, Klejštan 6 5		Pts: Koutouris 11; Rebs: Oztoprak 10; Asts: Papadopoulos 2

Gopass Arena
Attendance: 30
Referees: Alfonso Olivares (Spain), Raimonds Repelis (Latvia), Martin Demierre (Switzerland)

14 July 2026
18:00

Boxscore

Portugal	72–75	Iceland
Scoring by quarter: 15–25, 27–17, 20–18, 10–15
Pts: Andrade 19; Rebs: Caetano 7 Asts: Coelho 6		Pts: Lúðvíksson 19; Rebs: Lúðvíksson 13; Asts: Ármannsson 7

Gopass Arena
Attendance: 108
Referees: Ilias Karpanos (Greece), Oleksandr Oparin (Ukraine), Teo Miletić (Croatia)

14 July 2026
21:00

Boxscore

Kosovo	86–67	Armenia
Scoring by quarter: 20–16, 18–13, 29–26, 19–12
Pts: Istrefi 18; Rebs: Rrahmani 18; Asts: Hasanaj 9		Pts: Dayian 24; Rebs: Aghajanyan 10; Asts: Karibyan 3

EUBA Sports Hall
Attendance: 52
Referees: Zafer Yılmaz (Turkey), Martin Kučírek (Czech Republic), Paweł Pacek (Poland)

15 July 2026
15:30

Boxscore

Cyprus	88–58	Armenia
Scoring by quarter: 29–13, 20–14, 16–15, 23–16
Pts: Georgiou, Mannaris 16; Rebs: Kouzapas 12; Asts: Georgiou 6		Pts: Bruce 15; Rebs: Bruce 7 Asts: Karibyan 5

Gopass Arena
Attendance: 54
Referees: Zoran Mitrovski (North Macedonia), Oleksandr Oparin (Ukraine), Milan Sibinović (Serbia)

15 July 2026
16:00

Boxscore

Portugal	76–39	Kosovo
Scoring by quarter: 23–5, 19–10, 14–11, 20–13
Pts: Coelho 12; Rebs: Carrera, Caetano 5 Asts: Coelho, Panzo 4		Pts: Rrahmani 13; Rebs: Tafilaj 12; Asts: Hasanaj 5

EUBA Sports Hall
Attendance: 40
Referees: Viktor Nagy (Hungary), Ivo Kitsing (Estonia), Ivan Iliev (Bulgaria)

15 July 2026
20:30

Boxscore

Iceland	77–80	Bosnia and Herzegovina
Scoring by quarter: 19–22, 10–16, 27–18, 21–24
Pts: Halldorsson, Ludviksson 25; Rebs: Ludviksson 12; Asts: Davidsson 5		Pts: Kuridza 22; Rebs: Kuridza, Dedovic 9 Asts: Kljestan 6

Gopass Arena
Attendance: 74
Referees: Zdenko Tomašovič (Slovakia), (Azerbaijan), Julien Malane (Luxembourg)

=== Group D ===
Pos	Team	Pld	W	L	PF	PA	PD	Pts	Qualification
1	Bulgaria	4	4	0	361	278	+83	8	Quarterfinals
2	Hungary	4	3	1	346	266	+80	7	Quarterfinals
3	Netherlands	4	2	2	301	291	+10	6	9th–16th place playoffs
4	Denmark	4	1	3	289	351	−62	5	9th–16th place playoffs
5	Albania	4	0	4	268	379	−111	4	17th–21st place classification

Source: FIBA

10 July 2026
18:30

Boxscore

Hungary	83–72	Denmark
Scoring by quarter: 25–17, 22–12, 22–25, 14–18
Pts: Rosta 21; Rebs: Angyal, Rosta 7 Asts: Lukácsi, Varga 5		Pts: Møller 18; Rebs: Pedersen 6 Asts: Pedersen 6

EUBA Sports Hall
Attendance: 74
Referees: Nikolaos Tziopanos (Greece), Blazo Begenisic (Sweden), Ivo Kitsing (Estonia)

10 July 2026
21:00

Boxscore

Netherlands	82–59	Albania
Scoring by quarter: 26–15, 20–11, 18–14, 18–19
Pts: Beens 15; Rebs: Diouf 11; Asts: van la Parra, van den Berg 5		Pts: Vezi 13; Rebs: Bello 7 Asts: three players 2

EUBA Sports Hall
Attendance: 45
Referees: Zdenko Tomašovič (Slovakia), Oleksandr Oparin (Ukraine), Milan Sibinović (Serbia)

11 July 2026
15:30

Boxscore

Bulgaria	76–73	Netherlands
Scoring by quarter: 24–25, 25–12, 15–23, 12–13
Pts: Dimitrov 26; Rebs: Dimitrov 8 Asts: Kalinov 5		Pts: van den Berg 15; Rebs: Diouf 19; Asts: van la Parra 5

Gopass Arena
Attendance: 55
Referees: Kirile Tvauri (Georgia), Teo Miletić (Croatia), Bjarki Þór Davíðsson (Iceland)

11 July 2026
20:30

Boxscore

Albania	48–101	Hungary
Scoring by quarter: 16–21, 11–20, 12–37, 9–23
Pts: Heba, Bello 10; Rebs: Sinani 7 Asts: Bello 3		Pts: Angyal 18; Rebs: Mezőfi 8 Asts: Varga 6

Gopass Arena
Attendance: 95
Referees: Zoran Mitrovski (North Macedonia), Daniel Papaz (Bosnia and Herzegovina), Davit Kikhyan (Armenia)

12 July 2026
16:00

Boxscore

Denmark	91–88 (OT)	Albania
Scoring by quarter: 24–16, 16–21, 20–21, 20–22, Overtime: 11–8
Pts: Pedersen 24; Rebs: Møller 7 Asts: Pedersen 8		Pts: Sinani 24; Rebs: Jakaj 9 Asts: Bello 6

EUBA Sports Hall
Attendance: 50
Referees: Ilias Karpanos (Greece), Martin Kučírek (Czech Republic), Hugo Silva (Portugal)

12 July 2026
18:30

Boxscore

Hungary	78–86 (OT)	Bulgaria
Scoring by quarter: 20–20, 13–21, 20–13, 20–19, Overtime: 5–13
Pts: Gál 21; Rebs: Rosta 11; Asts: Lukácsi 6		Pts: Trifonov 22; Rebs: Vasilev 16; Asts: Trifonov 4

EUBA Sports Hall
Attendance: 61
Referees: Zdenko Tomašovič (Slovakia), Oleksandr Oparin (Ukraine), Xhelal Mumini (Kosovo)

14 July 2026
16:00

Boxscore

Bulgaria	94–54	Denmark
Scoring by quarter: 23–13, 23–8, 27–20, 21–13
Pts: Balkandzhiev 19; Rebs: Balkandzhiev 7 Asts: Kalinov 8		Pts: Møller 15; Rebs: Allersted, Kattenhoj 6 Asts: Møller 4

EUBA Sports Hall
Attendance: 42
Referees: Nikolaos Tziopanos (Greece), Urfan Bayramli (Azerbaijan), Julien Malane (Luxembourg)

14 July 2026
18:30

Boxscore

Netherlands	60–84	Hungary
Scoring by quarter: 13–23, 18–15, 14–28, 15–18
Pts: Ngouateu 15; Rebs: Ngouateu, Diouf 6 Asts: Beens, van den Berg 4		Pts: Szász-Veres 15; Rebs: Rosta 6 Asts: Gál 4

EUBA Sports Hall
Attendance: 80
Referees: Zoran Mitrovski (North Macedonia), Ivo Kitsing (Estonia), Michal Kuzia (Poland)

15 July 2026
11:00

Boxscore

Albania	73–105	Bulgaria
Scoring by quarter: 22–41, 12–31, 19–19, 20–14
Pts: Sinani 20; Rebs: Deliallisi, Heba 6 Asts: Bello 5		Pts: Balkandzhiev 19; Rebs: Dimitrov 7 Asts: Trifonov 5

EUBA Sports Hall
Attendance: 20
Referees: Ilias Karpanos (Greece), Michal Kuzia (Poland), Davit Kikhyan (Armenia)

15 July 2026
13:00

Boxscore

Denmark	72–86	Netherlands
Scoring by quarter: 15–23, 19–14, 16–27, 22–22
Pts: Møller 19; Rebs: Allersted 8 Asts: Pedersen 4		Pts: Diouf 17; Rebs: Diouf 21; Asts: van den Berg 4

Gopass Arena
Attendance: 100
Referees: Kirile Tvauri (Georgia), Hugo Silva (Portugal), Martin Demierre (Switzerland)

== 17th–21st place classification ==
=== Group E ===
Pos	Team	Pld	W	L	PF	PA	PD	Pts	Qualification
1	Kosovo	2	2	0	162	139	+23	4	17th place match
2	Armenia	2	1	1	141	143	−2	3	19th place match
3	Albania	2	0	2	129	150	−21	2	21st place

Source: FIBA

Note: The following match was carried over from the first round: KOS v. ARM 86–67.

17 July 2026
11:00

Boxscore

Armenia	74–57	Albania
Scoring by quarter: 16–17, 17–22, 9–9, 32–9

EUBA Sports Hall
Attendance: 13

18 July 2026
10:30

Boxscore

Albania	72–76	Kosovo
Scoring by quarter: 25–24, 12–17, 17–20, 18–15

Gopass Arena
Attendance: 17

=== 17th–20th place playoffs ===
17th–20th place semifinal
A5 Slovakia	71
B5 Estonia	72

17th place match
B5 Estonia	88
E1 Kosovo	77
19th place match
A5 Slovakia	79
E2 Armenia	46

==== 17th–20th place semifinal ====
17 July 2026
10:30

Boxscore

Slovakia	71–72	Estonia
Scoring by quarter: 19–17, 22–12, 16–15, 14–28

Gopass Arena
Attendance: 123

==== 19th place match ====
19 July 2026
10:00

Boxscore

Slovakia	79–46	Armenia
Scoring by quarter: 21–17, 18–7, 23–10, 17–12

EUBA Sports Hall
Attendance: 83

==== 17th place match ====
19 July 2026
12:30

Boxscore

Estonia	88–77	Kosovo
Scoring by quarter: 24–18, 24–18, 24–18, 16–23

EUBA Sports Hall
Attendance: 10

== 9th–16th place playoffs ==
13th place match
Cyprus	73
Switzerland	75
15th place match
Georgia	83
Denmark	76

13th–16th place semifinals
Georgia	54
Cyprus	78
Switzerland	103
Denmark	74

9th–16th place quarterfinals
A3	North Macedonia	97
B4	Georgia	62
D3	Netherlands	65
C4	Cyprus	47
B3	Switzerland	66
A4	Azerbaijan	72
C3	Bosnia and Herzegovina	93
D4	Denmark	77

9th–12th place semifinals
North Macedonia	89
Netherlands	60
Azerbaijan	53
Bosnia and Herzegovina	60

9th place match
North Macedonia	91
Bosnia and Herzegovina	81
11th place match
Netherlands	60
Azerbaijan	66

=== 9th–16th place quarterfinals ===
17 July 2026
13:30

Boxscore

North Macedonia	97–62	Georgia
Scoring by quarter: 22–16, 31–19, 26–18, 18–9

EUBA Sports Hall
Attendance: 9

17 July 2026
16:00

Boxscore

Netherlands	65–47	Cyprus
Scoring by quarter: 21–11, 16–18, 12–11, 16–7

EUBA Sports Hall
Attendance: 32

17 July 2026
18:30

Boxscore

Switzerland	66–72	Azerbaijan
Scoring by quarter: 16–12, 22–15, 15–26, 13–19

EUBA Sports Hall
Attendance: 35

17 July 2026
21:00

Boxscore

Bosnia and Herzegovina	93–77	Denmark
Scoring by quarter: 28–28, 28–16, 10–15, 27–18

EUBA Sports Hall
Attendance: 35

=== 13th–16th place semifinals ===
18 July 2026
13:30

Boxscore

Georgia	54–78	Cyprus
Scoring by quarter: 12–24, 18–14, 8–29, 16–11

EUBA Sports Hall
Attendance: 28

18 July 2026
16:00

Boxscore

Switzerland	103–74	Denmark
Scoring by quarter: 26–15, 26–25, 27–19, 24–15

EUBA Sports Hall
Attendance: 35

==== 15th place match ====
19 July 2026
15:00

Boxscore

Georgia	83–76	Denmark
Scoring by quarter: 21–20, 17–14, 21–24, 24–18

EUBA Sports Hall
Attendance: 25

==== 13th place match ====
19 July 2026
17:30

Boxscore

Cyprus	73–75	Switzerland
Scoring by quarter: 15–23, 29–14, 14–15, 15–23

EUBA Sports Hall
Attendance: 34

=== 9th–12th place semifinals ===
18 July 2026
18:30

Boxscore

North Macedonia	89–60	Netherlands
Scoring by quarter: 16–23, 32–11, 22–13, 19–13

EUBA Sports Hall
Attendance: 37

18 July 2026
21:00

Boxscore

Azerbaijan	53–60	Bosnia and Herzegovina
Scoring by quarter: 14–15, 14–15, 9–10, 16–20

EUBA Sports Hall
Attendance: 8

==== 11th place match ====
19 July 2026
20:00

Boxscore

Netherlands	60–66	Azerbaijan
Scoring by quarter: 14–17, 12–22, 17–19, 17–8

EUBA Sports Hall
Attendance: 43

==== 9th place match ====
19 July 2026
13:00

Boxscore

North Macedonia	91–81	Bosnia and Herzegovina
Scoring by quarter: 30–21, 22–20, 23–23, 16–17

Gopass Arena
Attendance: 15

== Championship playoffs ==
5th place match
Luxembourg	69
Ireland	85
7th place match
Bulgaria	92
Hungary	89

5th–8th place semifinals
Luxembourg	85
Bulgaria	71
Ireland	88
Hungary	79

Quarterfinals
A1	Sweden	71
B2	Luxembourg	62
D1	Bulgaria	76
C2	Iceland	79
B1	Ukraine	72
A2	Ireland	62
C1	Portugal	62
D2	Hungary	51

Semifinals
Sweden	76
Iceland	84
Ukraine	81
Portugal	61

Final
Iceland	64
Ukraine	74
3rd place match
Sweden	75
Portugal	68

=== Quarterfinals ===
17 July 2026
13:00

Boxscore

Sweden	71–62	Luxembourg
Scoring by quarter: 18–12, 16–17, 21–13, 16–20

Gopass Arena
Attendance: 47

17 July 2026
15:30

Boxscore

Bulgaria	76–79	Iceland
Scoring by quarter: 18–24, 24–18, 17–19, 17–18

Gopass Arena
Attendance: 64

17 July 2026
18:00

Boxscore

Ukraine	72–62	Ireland
Scoring by quarter: 17–13, 18–15, 8–19, 29–15

Gopass Arena
Attendance: 121

17 July 2026
20:30

Boxscore

Portugal	62–51	Hungary
Scoring by quarter: 18–13, 16–14, 11–18, 17–6

Gopass Arena
Attendance: 85

=== 5th–8th place semifinals ===
18 July 2026
13:00

Boxscore

Luxembourg	85–71	Bulgaria
Scoring by quarter: 21–20, 24–11, 30–16, 10–24

Gopass Arena
Attendance: 41

18 July 2026
15:30

Boxscore

Ireland	88–79	Hungary
Scoring by quarter: 20–22, 30–20, 21–16, 17–21

Gopass Arena
Attendance: 73

==== 7th place match ====
19 July 2026
10:30

Boxscore

Bulgaria	92–89	Hungary
Scoring by quarter: 17–20, 28–19, 21–23, 26–27

Gopass Arena
Attendance: 62

==== 5th place match ====
19 July 2026
15:30

Boxscore

Luxembourg	69–85	Ireland
Scoring by quarter: 22–20, 13–26, 12–21, 22–18

Gopass Arena
Attendance: 78

=== Semifinals ===
18 July 2026
18:00

Boxscore

Sweden	76–84	Iceland
Scoring by quarter: 23–15, 21–19, 13–16, 19–34

Gopass Arena
Attendance: 76

18 July 2026
20:30

Boxscore

Ukraine	81–61	Portugal
Scoring by quarter: 23–19, 19–6, 23–18, 16–18

Gopass Arena
Attendance: 125

==== 3rd place match ====
19 July 2026
18:00

Boxscore

Sweden	75–68 (OT)	Portugal
Scoring by quarter: 19–20, 11–9, 12–22, 23–14, Overtime: 10–3

Gopass Arena
Attendance: 118

==== Final ====
19 July 2026
20:30

Boxscore

Iceland	64–74	Ukraine
Scoring by quarter: 13–18, 14–16, 19–16, 18–24

Gopass Arena
Attendance: 263

== Final standings ==
Rank	Team	Record
1st place, gold medalist(s)	Ukraine	7–0
2nd place, silver medalist(s)	Iceland	6–2
3rd place, bronze medalist(s)	Sweden	6–1
4	Portugal	5–3
5	Ireland	5–2
6	Luxembourg	4–3
7	Bulgaria	5–2
8	Hungary	3–4
9	North Macedonia	5–2
10	Bosnia and Herzegovina	5–3
11	Azerbaijan	3–4
12	Netherlands	3–4
13	Switzerland	3–4
14	Cyprus	3–5
15	Georgia	2–5
16	Denmark	1–6
17	Estonia	3–3
18	Kosovo	2–5
19	Slovakia	1–5
20	Armenia	1–6
21	Albania	0–6

Promoted to the 2027 FIBA U20 EuroBasket Division A
