= 2018 FIBA U20 European Championship Division B =

Tournament details
- Host country: Bulgaria
- City: Sofia
- Dates: 13–22 July
- Teams: 22
- Venue(s): 3 (in 1 host city)

Final positions
- Champions: Poland (1st title)
- Runners-up: Slovenia
- Third place: Latvia
- Fourth place: Russia

Tournament statistics
- MVP: (Poland) Łukasz Kolenda
- Top scorer: (Azerbaijan) Endar Poladkhanli (24.9 ppg)

Official website
- www.fiba.basketball

The 2018 FIBA U20 European Championship Division B was the 14th edition of the Division B of the FIBA U20 European Championship, the second-tier level of the European Under-20 basketball championship. The tournament was played in Sofia, Bulgaria, from 13 to 22 July 2018.

== Participating teams ==
- Albania
- Armenia
- Azerbaijan
- Belarus
- Belgium
- Bulgaria
- Czech Republic ▼ (15th place, 2017 FIBA U20 European Championship Division A)
- Estonia
- Finland
- Georgia
- Hungary
- Kosovo
- Latvia ▼ (16th place, 2017 FIBA U20 European Championship Division A)
- Luxembourg
- Macedonia
- Moldova
- Netherlands
- Poland
- Portugal
- Russia
- Slovakia
- Slovenia ▼ (14th place, 2017 FIBA U20 European Championship Division A)

== Group phase ==
In the Group phase, the 22 participating teams are divided into two groups of six and two groups of five. Teams play five or four games within their group.

All times are local (UTC+3).

=== Group A ===
Pos	Team	Pld	W	L	PF	PA	PD	Pts	Qualification	(Latvia)	(Belgium)	(North Macedonia)	(Belarus)	(Azerbaijan)
1	Latvia	4	4	0	315	201	+114	8	Quarterfinals	—	63–60	79–39	81–56	92–46
2	Belgium	4	3	1	277	230	+47	7	Quarterfinals	60–63	—	76–65	60–51	81–51
3	Macedonia	4	2	2	262	299	−37	6	9th−16th place playoffs	39–79	65–76	—	84–77	74–67
4	Belarus	4	1	3	273	287	−14	5	9th−16th place playoffs	56–81	51–60	77–84	—	89–62
5	Azerbaijan	4	0	4	226	336	−110	4	17th−22nd place classification	46–92	51–81	67–74	62–89	—

Source: FIBA
Rules for classification: 1) Points; 2) Head-to-head results; 3) Points difference; 4) Points scored.

=== Group B ===
Pos	Team	Pld	W	L	PF	PA	PD	Pts	Qualification	(Slovenia)	(Bulgaria)	(Estonia)	(Albania)	(Slovakia)	(Moldova)
1	Slovenia	5	5	0	420	247	+173	10	Quarterfinals	—	73–52	55–50	86–52	71–49	135–44
2	Bulgaria (H)	5	4	1	355	298	+57	9	Quarterfinals	52–73	—	58–56	84–54	69–56	92–59
3	Estonia	5	3	2	355	282	+73	8	9th−16th place playoffs	50–55	56–58	—	85–58	73–71	91–40
4	Albania	5	2	3	380	392	−12	7	9th−16th place playoffs	52–86	54–84	58–85	—	77–71	139–66
5	Slovakia	5	1	4	347	348	−1	6	17th−22nd place classification	49–71	56–69	71–73	71–77	—	100–58
6	Moldova	5	0	5	267	557	−290	5	17th−22nd place classification	44–135	59–92	40–91	66–139	58–100	—

Source: FIBA
Rules for classification: 1) Points; 2) Head-to-head results; 3) Points difference; 4) Points scored.
(H) Hosts

=== Group C ===
Pos	Team	Pld	W	L	PF	PA	PD	Pts	Qualification
1	Russia	5	5	0	389	323	+66	10	Quarterfinals
2	Czech Republic	5	4	1	365	283	+82	9	Quarterfinals
3	Netherlands	5	3	2	313	262	+51	8	9th−16th place playoffs
4	Hungary	5	2	3	339	294	+45	7	9th−16th place playoffs
5	Luxembourg	5	1	4	299	329	−30	6	17th−22nd place classification
6	Armenia	5	0	5	248	462	−214	5	17th−22nd place classification

Source: FIBA
Rules for classification: 1) Points; 2) Head-to-head results; 3) Points difference; 4) Points scored.

13 July 2018
13:45

Boxscore

Armenia	62–75	Luxembourg

Universiada Hall, Sofia

13 July 2018
16:00

Boxscore

Hungary	50–63	Czech Republic

St. George School Gym, Sofia

13 July 2016
18:15

Boxscore

Netherlands	63–73	Russia
Scoring by quarter: 14−12, 11−20, 17−21, 21−20
Pts: Van Eyck 11; Rebs: Enaruna 8 Asts: Van Oostrum 5		Pts: Motovilov 24; Rebs: Khomenko 7 Asts: Tonoyan 7

Triaditza Hall, Sofia
Referees: Charalampos Karakatsounis (GRE), Valentin Oliot (FRA), Kristaps Konstantinovs (LAT)

14 July 2018
13:45

Boxscore

Russia	69–68	Hungary
Scoring by quarter: 21−15, 16−11, 18−23, 14−19
Pts: Motovilov 26; Rebs: Tikhonenko 5 Asts: Motovilov 5		Pts: Németh, Pápai 12; Rebs: Völgyi 6 Asts: Kerpel-Fronius, Völgyi 2

Universiada Hall, Sofia
Referees: Luis Lopes (POR), Ivan Miličević (BIH), Nikolay Tsintsarski (BUL)

14 July 2018
18:15

Boxscore

Luxembourg	47–66	Netherlands

St. George School Gym, Sofia

14 July 2016
20:30

Boxscore

Czech Republic	99–46	Armenia

St. George School Gym, Sofia

15 July 2018
16:00

Boxscore

Armenia	54–97	Russia
Scoring by quarter: 12−18, 2−17, 24−30, 16−32
Pts: Zohrabian 10; Rebs: four players 4 Asts: Koyumjan 4		Pts: Tonoyan, Toure 16; Rebs: Mikheev 9 Asts: Akhmedov 10

St. George School Gym, Sofia
Referees: Siniša Prpa (SRB), Erion Hoxhaj (ALB), Ivan Mijalkovski (MKD)

15 July 2018
16:00

Boxscore

Czech Republic	63–53	Luxembourg

Triaditza Hall, Sofia

15 July 2018
20:30

Boxscore

Hungary	42–50	Netherlands

Universiada Hall, Sofia

17 July 2018
16:00

Boxscore

Russia	85–76	Czech Republic
Scoring by quarter: 14−15, 20−17, 25−21, 26−23
Pts: Andrianov 15; Rebs: Klyuev 6 Asts: Andrianov, Tonoyan 4		Pts: Nábělek 21; Rebs: Kozák 9 Asts: Kozák 5

Triaditza Hall, Sofia
Referees: Vilius Mačiulaitis (LTU), Sebastián Negrón (CHI), Chess van Looy (BEL)

17 July 2018
18:15

Boxscore

Luxembourg	62–73	Hungary

Triaditza Hall, Sofia

17 July 2018
20:30

Boxscore

Netherlands	85–36	Armenia

Triaditza Hall, Sofia

18 July 2018
13:45

Boxscore

Russia	65–62	Luxembourg
Scoring by quarter: 17−16, 25−8, 11−23, 12−15
Pts: Motovilov 13; Rebs: Khomenko, Toure 7 Asts: Akhmedov 6		Pts: Andjelkovic 23; Rebs: Andjelkovic 7 Asts: Lessel 3

Universiada Hall, Sofia
Referees: Oskars Lucis (LAT), Nikolay Tsintsarski (BUL), Aleksandar Davidov (MKD)

18 July 2018
18:15

Boxscore

Armenia	50–106	Hungary

Universiada Hall, Sofia

18 July 2018
20:30

Boxscore

Czech Republic	64–49	Netherlands

Universiada Hall, Sofia

=== Group D ===
Pos	Team	Pld	W	L	PF	PA	PD	Pts	Qualification	(Poland)	(Finland)	(Georgia (country))	(Portugal)	(Kosovo)
1	Poland	4	4	0	304	240	+64	8	Quarterfinals	—	81–66	59–58	93–63	71–53
2	Finland	4	3	1	304	241	+63	7	Quarterfinals	66–81	—	71–56	83–59	84–45
3	Georgia	4	2	2	261	269	−8	6	9th−16th place playoffs	58–59	56–71	—	66–62	81–77
4	Portugal	4	1	3	260	309	−49	5	9th−16th place playoffs	63–93	59–83	62–66	—	76–67
5	Kosovo	4	0	4	242	312	−70	4	17th−22nd place classification	53–71	45–84	77–81	67–76	—

Source: FIBA
Rules for classification: 1) Points; 2) Head-to-head results; 3) Points difference; 4) Points scored.

== 17th−22nd place classification ==
=== Group E ===
Pos	Team	Pld	W	L	PF	PA	PD	Pts	Qualification	(Slovakia)	(Azerbaijan)	(Moldova)
1	Slovakia	2	2	0	209	127	+82	4	17th place game	—	109–69	100–58
2	Azerbaijan	2	1	1	190	165	+25	3	19th place game	69–109	—	121–56
3	Moldova	2	0	2	114	221	−107	2	21st place game	58–100	56–121	—

Source: FIBA
Rules for classification: 1) Points; 2) Head-to-head results; 3) Points difference; 4) Points scored.

=== Group F ===
Pos	Team	Pld	W	L	PF	PA	PD	Pts	Qualification	(Kosovo)	(Luxembourg)	(Armenia)
1	Kosovo	2	2	0	160	130	+30	4	17th place game	—	73–67	87–63
2	Luxembourg	2	1	1	142	135	+7	3	19th place game	67–73	—	75–62
3	Armenia	2	0	2	125	162	−37	2	21st place game	63–87	62–75	—

Source: FIBA
Rules for classification: 1) Points; 2) Head-to-head results; 3) Points difference; 4) Points scored.

=== 21st place game ===
22 July 2018
13:45

Boxscore

Moldova	66–75	Armenia

St. George School Gym, Sofia

=== 19th place game ===
22 July 2018
16:00

Boxscore

Azerbaijan	73–92	Luxembourg

St. George School Gym, Sofia

=== 17th place game ===
22 July 2018
18:15

Boxscore

Slovakia	82–73	Kosovo

St. George School Gym, Sofia

== 9th−16th place playoffs ==
13th place game
D3	Georgia	88
B3	Estonia	64
15th place game
B4	Albania	48
C3	Netherlands	78

13th−16th place semifinals
B4	Albania	44
D3	Georgia	104
B3	Estonia	56
C3	Netherlands	54

9th−16th place quarterfinals
A3	Macedonia	77
B4	Albania	69
D3	Georgia	54
C4	Hungary	65
B3	Estonia	53
A4	Belarus	66
C3	Netherlands	51
D4	Portugal	65

9th−12th place semifinals
A3	Macedonia	34
C4	Hungary	57
A4	Belarus	64
D4	Portugal	71

9th place game
C4	Hungary	60
D4	Portugal	67
11th place game
A3	Macedonia	73
A4	Belarus	83

== Championship playoffs ==
Fifth place game
C2	Czech Republic	72
D2	Finland	87
Seventh place game
B2	Bulgaria	64
A2	Belgium	52

5th–8th place semifinals
B2	Bulgaria	53
C2	Czech Republic	60
A2	Belgium	58
D2	Finland	69

Quarterfinals
A1	Latvia	77
B2	Bulgaria	57
D1	Poland	91
C2	Czech Republic	70
B1	Slovenia	64
A2	Belgium	52
C1	Russia	78
D2	Finland	71

Semifinals
A1	Latvia	62
D1	Poland (OT)	66
B1	Slovenia	60
C1	Russia	50

Final
D1	Poland	71
B1	Slovenia	60
Third place game
A1	Latvia	76
C1	Russia	62

=== Quarterfinals ===
20 July 2018
13:45

Boscsore

Slovenia	64–52	Belgium
Scoring by quarter: 20−3, 10−13, 15−17, 19−19
Pts: Škedelj 20; Rebs: Macura 8 Asts: Macura, Strmčnik 3		Pts: Snyers 13; Rebs: Lambrecht 10; Asts: Peeters, Snyers 2

Universiada Hall, Sofia
Referees: Vilius Mačiulaitis (LTU), Oskars Lucis (LAT), Petr Hrůša (CZE)

20 July 2018
16:00

Boscsore

Russia	78–71	Finland
Scoring by quarter: 16−24, 17−16, 25−9, 20−22
Pts: Motovilov 23; Rebs: Popov 10; Asts: Andrianov, Motovilov 3		Pts: Gustavson, Maxhuni 17; Rebs: Nyman 6 Asts: Maxhuni 11

Universiada Hall, Sofia
Referees: Luis Lopes (POR), Luka Kardum (CRO), Valentin Oliot (FRA)

20 July 2018
18:15

Boscsore

Latvia	77–57	Bulgaria
Scoring by quarter: 18−15, 22−13, 24−14, 13−15
Pts: Strautiņš 23; Rebs: Strautiņš 11; Asts: Zoriks 6		Pts: Minchev 10; Rebs: Alipiev 8 Asts: L. Dimitrov 4

Universiada Hall, Sofia
Referees: Charalampos Karakatsounis (GRE), Gentian Cici (ALB), Sebastián Negrón (CHI)

20 July 2018
20:30

Boscsore

Poland	91–70	Czech Republic
Scoring by quarter: 23−17, 27−18, 16−25, 25−10
Pts: Rutkowski 17; Rebs: Bogucki 13; Asts: Kolenda 6		Pts: Tůma 16; Rebs: Kolář, Kozák 7 Asts: Tůma 5

Universiada Hall, Sofia
Referees: Zafer Yılmaz (TUR), Johannes Sarekoski (FIN), Siniša Prpa (SRB)

=== 5th–8th place semifinals ===
21 July 2018
13:45

Boxscore

Belgium	58–69	Finland
Scoring by quarter: 20−19, 21−20, 3−16, 14−14
Pts: Lambrecht 15; Rebs: Lambrecht 14; Asts: Snyers 5		Pts: Maxhuni 16; Rebs: Nyman 6 Asts: Valtonen 3

Universiada Hall, Sofia
Referees: Oskars Lucis (LAT), Ivan Miličević (BIH), Sebastián Negrón (CHI)

21 July 2018
16:00

Boxscore

Bulgaria	53–60	Czech Republic
Scoring by quarter: 12−17, 10−15, 18−13, 13−15
Pts: Minchev 18; Rebs: Alipiev, Minchev 7 Asts: L. Dimitrov 5		Pts: Kolář 16; Rebs: Kotásek, Štafl 7 Asts: Kolář 3

Universiada Hall, Sofia
Referees: Anton Makhlin (RUS), Marek Maliszewski (POL), Kristaps Konstantinovs (LAT)

=== Semifinals ===
21 July 2018
18:15

Boxscore

Latvia	62–66 (OT)	Poland
Scoring by quarter: 7−14, 11−15, 14−17, 22−8, Overtime: 8−12
Pts: Strautiņš 17; Rebs: Blumbergs 14; Asts: Zoriks, Zotovs 4		Pts: Kolenda 20; Rebs: Bogucki 18; Asts: Kobel 7

Universiada Hall, Sofia
Referees: Zafer Yılmaz (TUR), Gentian Cici (ALB), Charalampos Karakatsounis (GRE)

21 July 2018
20:30

Boxscore

Slovenia	60–50	Russia
Scoring by quarter: 18−12, 7−12, 16−16, 19−10
Pts: Macura 19; Rebs: Macura 19; Asts: Bratec 6		Pts: Motovilov 26; Rebs: Andrianov, Lopatin 7 Asts: Khomenko 3

Universiada Hall, Sofia
Referees: Luka Kardum (CRO), Luis Lopes (POR), Vilius Mačiulaitis (LTU)

=== Seventh place game ===
22 July 2018
13:45

Boxscore

Bulgaria	64–52	Belgium
Scoring by quarter: 19–12, 19–10, 13–15, 13–15
Pts: Minchev 25; Rebs: Minchev, Vasov 7 Asts: L. Dimitrov 5		Pts: Buysschaert 15; Rebs: Buysschaert 8 Asts: Mortant 4

Universiada Hall, Sofia
Referees: Luis Lopes (POR), Johannes Sarekoski (FIN), Ivan Mijalkovski (MKD)

=== Fifth place game ===
22 July 2018
16:00

Boxscore

Czech Republic	72–87	Finland
Scoring by quarter: 14–23, 24–17, 15–25, 19–22
Pts: Kozák 13; Rebs: Kolář 6 Asts: Tůma 5		Pts: Valtonen 16; Rebs: Kaukiainen, Nyman 7 Asts: Kaukiainen 10

Universiada Hall, Sofia
Referees: Charalampos Karakatsounis (GRE), Chess van Looy (BEL), Aleksandar Davidov (MKD)

=== Third place game ===
22 July 2018
18:15

Boxscore

Latvia	76–62	Russia
Scoring by quarter: 16–20, 24–18, 20–10, 16–14
Pts: Strautiņš 24; Rebs: Blumbergs 13; Asts: Zoriks 8		Pts: Khomenko 13; Rebs: Klyuev 8 Asts: Klyuev, Motovilov 2

Universiada Hall, Sofia
Referees: Zafer Yılmaz (TUR), Vilius Mačiulaitis (LTU), Siniša Prpa (SRB)

=== Final ===
22 July 2018
20:30

Boxscore

Poland	71–60	Slovenia
Scoring by quarter: 19–19, 14–13, 22–15, 16–13
Pts: Kolenda 19; Rebs: Gołębiowski 10; Asts: Kobel 5		Pts: Bratec 20; Rebs: Macura 9 Asts: Strmčnik 6

Universiada Hall, Sofia
Attendance: 400
Referees: Luka Kardum (CRO), Oskars Lucis (LAT), Nikolay Tsintsarski (BUL)

== Final standings ==
Rank	Team	Record
1st place, gold medalist(s)	Poland	7–0
2nd place, silver medalist(s)	Slovenia	7–1
3rd place, bronze medalist(s)	Latvia	6–1
4	Russia	6–2
5	Finland	5–2
6	Czech Republic	5–3
7	Bulgaria	5–3
8	Belgium	3–4
9	Portugal	4–3
10	Hungary	4–4
11	Belarus	3–4
12	Macedonia	3–4
13	Georgia	4–3
14	Estonia	4–4
15	Netherlands	4–4
16	Albania	2–6
17	Slovakia	3–4
18	Kosovo	2–5
19	Luxembourg	2–5
20	Azerbaijan	1–6
21	Armenia	1–6
22	Moldova	0–7

Promoted to the 2019 FIBA U20 European Championship Division A
