= Bosnia and Herzegovina women's national under-20 basketball team =

Bosnia and Herzegovina
- FIBA zone: FIBA Europe
- National federation: Košarkaški savez Bosne i Hercegovine

U20 EuroBasket
- Appearances: 2
- Medals: None

U20 EuroBasket Division B
- Appearances: 2
- Medals: (gold) Gold: 1 (2015)
Home	Away

The Bosnia and Herzegovina women's national under-20 basketball team is a national basketball team of Bosnia and Herzegovina, administered by the Basketball Federation of Bosnia and Herzegovina. It represents the country in international under-20 women's basketball competitions.

== FIBA U20 Women's EuroBasket participations ==
Year	Division A	Division B
2014		5th
2015		1st place, gold medalist(s)
2016	11th	
2017	16th	

== See also ==
- Bosnia and Herzegovina women's national basketball team
- Bosnia and Herzegovina women's national under-18 and under-19 basketball team
- Bosnia and Herzegovina women's national under-16 and under-17 basketball team
- Bosnia and Herzegovina men's national under-20 basketball team
