= Nihad Selimović =

President of the Management Board of KK Bosna
- Incumbent
- Assumed office June 2026
- Preceded by: Dubravko Barbarić

Personal details
- Born: Travnik, SR Bosnia and Herzegovina, SFR Yugoslavia
- Education: Faculty of Sport and Physical Education, University of Sarajevo; Faculty of Medicine, University of Sarajevo
- Occupation: Sports executive, businessman, academic administrator
- Known for: Founder of OKK Spars; president of FK Željezničar; president of NK Travnik; president of KK Bosna

Nihad Selimović is a Bosnian sports executive, businessman, and academic administrator. He has served since June 2026 as president of the Management Board of KK Bosna, a basketball club based in Sarajevo, Bosnia and Herzegovina. He is best known in Bosnian sport for founding the youth basketball club OKK Spars, and for previously heading the football club FK Željezničar and NK Travnik.

== Early life and education ==
Selimović comes from a family with roots in Sapna, a town on the Drina river in northeastern Bosnia and Herzegovina. He played basketball in his youth before moving into club administration and business. He holds degrees from both the Faculty of Sport and the Faculty of Medicine in Sarajevo, and is often referred to by the honorific "dr." in Bosnian media.

== Career ==
=== OKK/KK Spars ===
Selimović founded the basketball club Spars (also known at various points as OKK Spars and KK Spars Realway), based in Sarajevo. Under his leadership the club became known as one of the more organised basketball institutions in the Former Yugoslavia, with an emphasis on youth development. He served as the club's president for many years. Players developed by the club include Džanan Musa, Tarik Biberović, Aleksej Nikolić, Amar Gegić, Edin Atić, and others.

=== NK Travnik and education ventures ===
Earlier in his career, Selimović served as president of the football club NK Travnik. He is also a co-founder and administrator of private higher-education institutions in Travnik, including serving as president of the Management Board of the University of Travnik and as founder of its Faculty of Education and Faculty of Technical Studies.

=== FK Željezničar ===
In December 2018, Selimović was elected president of FK Željezničar, one of the largest football clubs in Bosnia and Herzegovina, succeeding Senad Misimović. At the time of his election he was also president of KK Spars. In his acceptance remarks he said his goal was to bring stability to the club and to keep it open to all who wished to contribute to its development.

=== KK Bosna ===
In June 2026, following the resignation of the previous Management Board led by Dubravko Barbarić, the Assembly of KK Bosna appointed a new Management Board with Selimović as president; Amel Kovačević and Damir Kreso were named as members, later joined by Emir Haračić, Ismar Adžajlić, Toni Vukadin, and Mirza Muzurović. His appointment came shortly after the club had won its first Bosnian championship title in 18 years and had reached the ABA League playoff quarterfinals and the last eight of the FIBA Europe Cup.

At his first press conference after taking office, Selimović described the situation he had inherited as alarming, noting that only one player remained under contract, and outlined a plan to expand the Management Board and revise the club's statute. He said his vision for the club included maintaining championship-winning youth teams at every age level, building a basketball school of several hundred children, and expanding the club's network of supporters across Bosnia and Herzegovina and the wider region.

== Other activities ==
Selimović has been active in Bosnian basketball governance more broadly and is credited by some in the sport with helping prevent a split within the Basketball Federation of Bosnia and Herzegovina; he was among those who recommended Mirza Teletović for the federation's presidency. He has also been described as one of a small group of figures closely associated with the Olympic Committee of Bosnia and Herzegovina, alongside Vjekoslav Kisić, Izet Rađo, and Marjan Kvesić.

He has been involved in humanitarian initiatives, including delivering aid to flood-affected areas of Bosnia and Herzegovina together with KK Spars and the Association of Sports Journalists, and helped organise a memorial basketball tournament in honour of the late KK Bosna player and coach Sabit Hadžić.

== See also ==
- KK Bosna
- FK Željezničar
- Basketball Federation of Bosnia and Herzegovina
