= Dubravko Barbarić =

President of the Management Board of KK Bosna
- In office June 2023 – June 2026
- Preceded by: Almir Bradić
- Succeeded by: Nihad Selimović

Personal details
- Born: 11 May 1975 (age 51) Sarajevo, SR Bosnia and Herzegovina, SFR Yugoslavia
- Education: Faculty of Political Science, University of Zagreb; Faculty of Economics, University of Sarajevo (postgraduate studies)
- Occupation: Businessman, sports executive
- Known for: President of KK Bosna; president of KK Budućnost Bijeljina; former secretary general of the Basketball Federation of Bosnia and Herzegovina

Dubravko Barbarić is a Bosnian businessman and sports executive from Sarajevo. He served from June 2023 to June 2026 as president of the Management Board of KK Bosna, a basketball club based in Sarajevo, Bosnia and Herzegovina, during which the club won its first Bosnian championship title in 18 years. He previously served as secretary general of the Basketball Federation of Bosnia and Herzegovina and as president of KK Budućnost in Bijeljina.

== Business career ==
He is the owner of the companies Diamedic and Profy Bijeljina, both active in the medical trade sector. Diamedic, founded in 1997, imports and distributes pharmaceutical products and laboratory equipment, while Profy trades in medical consumables. He has also held a position as acting member of the Supervisory Board of the city-wide public broadcaster TVSA.

== Basketball administration ==
=== Basketball Federation of Bosnia and Herzegovina ===
From 2016 to 2018, Barbarić served as secretary general of the Basketball Federation of Bosnia and Herzegovina.

=== KK Budućnost ===
Barbarić subsequently became president of KK Budućnost, a basketball club in Bijeljina, which under his leadership rose from the Republika Srpska regional league to the Bosnian League, the country's top-tier basketball division. The club's senior team went on to compete under the sponsored name KK Budućnost Profy Bijeljina.

=== KK Bosna ===
In June 2023, Barbarić took over as president of KK Bosna, succeeding Almir Bradić, at a time when the club, a former European champion, had been struggling on and off the court for years. As part of the takeover, a group of Budućnost players and staff moved with him to Bosna.

In his first season in charge, the club won the Bosnian Cup for the first time in 14 years and reached the semi-finals of the Bosnian championship. In his second season, the club won the ABA 2 League title after entering through the qualifying rounds. His third season was described by the club as a triple crown, with the team becoming Bosnian champions for the first time in 18 years, winning the Bosnian Cup, taking the junior national title after 18 years, finishing seventh in the ABA League, and reaching the quarter-finals of the FIBA Europe Cup after entering through qualification.

During his tenure the club competed under sponsorship names including KK Bosna Meridianbet, KK Bosna Visit Sarajevo and KK Bosna BH Telecom. In February 2026, Barbarić publicly criticised the Basketball Federation and its secretary general, Dževad Alihodžić, over administrative delays affecting the club's junior players, publishing correspondence between the two on social media; the federation rejected the criticism in a public statement.

Barbarić resigned as president of KK Bosna in June 2026, ending what was described in Bosnian media as one of the most successful eras in the club's modern history. He was succeeded by Nihad Selimović, who was appointed president of a new Management Board later that month.

== Political career ==
Barbarić has been involved in Bosnian party politics alongside his business and sports activities. In 2010, he was elected to the Union for a Better Future of BiH presidency during a leadership vote reported by Klix.ba.

By the mid-2010s, Barbarić was a member of the Democratic Front, sitting on both its Main Board and its Presidency. A 2015 report on internal party disputes described him as having backed DF Vice-President Reuf Bajrović in a disagreement over leadership of Aluminij Industries.

In September 2019, Barbarić was appointed, on the Democratic Front's nomination, to the Supervisory Board of the Sarajevo Canton public broadcaster TVSA, alongside representatives of the Social Democratic Party and People and Justice. He resigned from the board in March 2020, amid a dispute in which the Party of Democratic Action was reported to be pushing to replace the broadcaster's director.

== See also ==
- KK Bosna
- Basketball Federation of Bosnia and Herzegovina
- Nihad Selimović
