= Bosnia and Herzegovina men's national under-20 basketball team =

Bosnia and Herzegovina
- FIBA zone: FIBA Europe
- National federation: Košarkaški savez Bosne i Hercegovine
- Coach: (Bosnia and Herzegovina) Admir Prašović
- Nickname(s): Zlatni ljiljani (The Golden Lilies); Zmajevi (The Dragons)

U20 EuroBasket
- Appearances: 1
- Medals: None

U20 EuroBasket Division B
- Appearances: 4
- Medals: Gold: 1 (2014)
| Home | Away |

The Bosnia and Herzegovina men's national under-20 basketball team is a national basketball team of Bosnia and Herzegovina, administered by the Basketball Federation of Bosnia and Herzegovina. It represents the country in international under-20 men's basketball competitions.

== FIBA U20 EuroBasket participations ==
| Year | Division A | Division B |
|---|---|---|
| 2011 | | 6th |
| 2014 | | 1st place, gold medalist(s) |
| 2015 | 19th | |
| 2016 | | 5th |
| 2026 | | 10th |

== See also ==
- Bosnia and Herzegovina men's national basketball team
- Bosnia and Herzegovina men's national under-18 basketball team
- Bosnia and Herzegovina women's national under-20 basketball team
