= 2016 FIBA U20 European Championship Division B =

Tournament details
- Host country: Greece
- City: Chalkida
- Dates: 15–24 July 2016
- Teams: 21 (from 1 confederation)
- Venue(s): 2 (in 1 host city)

Final positions
- Champions: Montenegro (2nd title)
- Runners-up: Iceland
- Third place: Greece

Tournament statistics
- MVP: (Greece) Vassilis Charalampopoulos

Official website
- www.fiba.basketball

The 2016 FIBA U20 European Championship Division B was the 12th edition of the Division B of the FIBA U20 European Championship, the second-tier level of the European Under-20 basketball championship. The tournament was played in Chalkida, Greece, from 15 to 24 July 2016. Montenegro won gold by beating Iceland in the final, 78–76. Montenegro, Iceland, and Greece won promotion to Division A.

== Participating teams ==
- Albania
- Armenia
- Belarus
- Bosnia and Herzegovina ▼ (19th place, 2015 FIBA Europe Under-20 Championship Division A)
- Bulgaria ▼ (20th place, 2015 FIBA Europe Under-20 Championship Division A)
- Croatia ▼ (17th place, 2015 FIBA Europe Under-20 Championship Division A)
- Estonia
- Georgia
- Great Britain ▼ (15th place, 2015 FIBA Europe Under-20 Championship Division A)
- Greece ▼ (18th place, 2015 FIBA Europe Under-20 Championship Division A)
- Iceland
- Ireland
- Kosovo
- Macedonia
- Montenegro
- Netherlands
- Poland ▼ (14th place, 2015 FIBA Europe Under-20 Championship Division A)
- Portugal
- Romania
- Russia ▼ (16th place, 2015 FIBA Europe Under-20 Championship Division A)
- Slovakia

== First round ==
In this round, the 21 teams are allocated in one groups of six teams and three groups of five teams. The top two teams in each group advance to the Second round. The other teams will play in the Classification Games.

=== Group A ===
Pos	Team	Pld	W	L	PF	PA	PD	Pts	Team advances to
1	Montenegro	4	4	0	289	179	+110	8	Quarterfinals
2	Georgia	4	2	2	284	259	+25	6	Quarterfinals
3	Portugal	4	2	2	224	256	−32	6	9th–16th place classification
4	Macedonia	4	1	3	226	271	−45	5	9th–16th place classification
5	Armenia	4	1	3	219	277	−58	5	17th–21st place classification

Source: FIBA
Rules for classification: 1) Points; 2) Head-to-head results; 3) Points difference; 4) Points scored.

15 July 2016

Montenegro	78–55	Georgia

15 July 2016

Armenia	56–67	Macedonia

16 July 2016

Portugal	70–54	Armenia

16 July 2016

Macedonia	44–67	Montenegro

17 July 2016

Georgia	85–61	Macedonia

17 July 2016

Montenegro	66–36	Portugal

19 July 2016

Armenia	44–78	Montenegro

19 July 2016

Portugal	55–82	Georgia

20 July 2016

Macedonia	54–63	Portugal

20 July 2016

Georgia	62–65	Armenia

=== Group B ===
Pos	Team	Pld	W	L	PF	PA	PD	Pts	Team advances to
1	Iceland	4	3	1	278	270	+8	7	Quarterfinals
2	Poland	4	3	1	270	221	+49	7	Quarterfinals
3	Russia	4	2	2	270	248	+22	6	9th–16th place classification
4	Belarus	4	2	2	254	304	−50	6	9th–16th place classification
5	Estonia	4	0	4	239	268	−29	4	17th–21st place classification

Source: FIBA
Rules for classification: 1) Points; 2) Head-to-head results; 3) Points difference; 4) Points scored.

15 July 2016

Russia	61–49	Estonia

15 July 2016

Belarus	73–70	Iceland

16 July 2016

Poland	80–51	Belarus

16 July 2016

Iceland	71–65	Russia

17 July 2016

Estonia	72–75	Iceland

17 July 2016

Russia	60–70	Poland

19 July 2016

Belarus	58–84	Russia

19 July 2016

Poland	60–48	Estonia

20 July 2016

Iceland	62–60	Poland

20 July 2016

Estonia	70–72	Belarus

=== Group C ===
Pos	Team	Pld	W	L	PF	PA	PD	Pts	Team advances to
1	Greece	5	5	0	443	223	+220	10	Quarterfinals
2	Great Britain	5	4	1	309	280	+29	9	Quarterfinals
3	Ireland	5	3	2	301	316	−15	8	9th–16th place classification
4	Netherlands	5	2	3	268	274	−6	7	9th–16th place classification
5	Kosovo	5	1	4	256	366	−110	6	17th–21st place classification
6	Albania	5	0	5	235	353	−118	5	17th–21st place classification

Source: FIBA
Rules for classification: 1) Points; 2) Head-to-head results; 3) Points difference; 4) Points scored.

15 July 2016

Albania	44–62	Great Britain

15 July 2016

Netherlands	69–40	Kosovo

15 July 2016

Ireland	47–93	Greece

16 July 2016

Great Britain	66–56	Ireland

16 July 2016

Kosovo	62–55	Albania

16 July 2016

Greece	68–38	Netherlands

17 July 2016

Kosovo	58–72	Great Britain

17 July 2016

Netherlands	58–64	Ireland

17 July 2016

Albania	35–97	Greece

19 July 2016

Ireland	67–47	Albania

19 July 2016

Great Britain	48–40	Netherlands

19 July 2016

Greece	103–44	Kosovo

20 July 2016

Albania	54–65	Netherlands

20 July 2016

Kosovo	52–67	Ireland

20 July 2016

Greece	82–61	Great Britain

=== Group D ===
Pos	Team	Pld	W	L	PF	PA	PD	Pts	Team advances to
1	Croatia	4	4	0	343	234	+109	8	Quarterfinals
2	Bosnia and Herzegovina	4	3	1	310	237	+73	7	Quarterfinals
3	Romania	4	1	3	272	297	−25	5	9th–16th place classification
4	Slovakia	4	1	3	253	343	−90	5	9th–16th place classification
5	Bulgaria	4	1	3	237	304	−67	5	17th–21st place classification

Source: FIBA
Rules for classification: 1) Points; 2) Head-to-head results; 3) Points difference; 4) Points scored.

15 July 2016

Croatia	100–67	Romania

15 July 2016

Slovakia	73–83	Bulgaria

16 July 2016

Bosnia and Herzegovina	97–51	Slovakia

16 July 2016

Bulgaria	47–81	Croatia

17 July 2016

Romania	76–49	Bulgaria

17 July 2016

Croatia	70–66	Bosnia and Herzegovina

19 July 2016

Slovakia	54–92	Croatia

19 July 2016

Bosnia and Herzegovina	73–58	Romania

20 July 2016

Bulgaria	58–74	Bosnia and Herzegovina

20 July 2016

Romania	71–75	Slovakia

== Classification round ==
=== 17th–21st place classification ===
Group E

Pos	Team	Pld	W	L	PF	PA	PD	Pts	Qualification
1	Bulgaria	2	2	0	154	110	+44	4	17th place game
2	Kosovo	2	1	1	116	133	−17	3	19th place game
3	Albania	2	0	2	111	138	−27	2	21st place

Source: FIBA

22 July 2016

Albania	56–76	Bulgaria

23 July 2016

Bulgaria	78–54	Kosovo

Group F

22 July 2016

Armenia	74–68	Estonia

Armenia will play for 17th place; Estonia will play for 19th place.

19th place game

24 July 2016

Kosovo	69–93	Estonia

17th place game

24 July 2016

Bulgaria	61–65	Armenia

=== 9th–16th place classification ===
9th–16th place quarterfinals
22 July
Portugal	75
Belarus	74
22 July
Romania	71
Netherlands	54
22 July
Russia	92
Macedonia	59
22 July
Ireland	77
Slovakia	70

9th–12th place semifinals
23 July
Portugal	56
Romania	62
23 July
Russia	90
Ireland	35

Ninth place
24 July
Romania	72
Russia	78
Eleventh place
24 July
Portugal	64
Ireland	38

13th–16th place semifinals
23 July
Belarus	76
Netherlands	43
23 July
Macedonia	92
Slovakia	75

13th place
24 July
Belarus	85
Macedonia	33
15th place
24 July
Netherlands	76
Slovakia	46

=== 5th–8th place classification ===
5th–8th place semifinals
23 July
Poland	78
Great Britain	74
23 July
Georgia	49
Bosnia and Herzegovina	89

Fifth place
24 July
Poland	63
Bosnia and Herzegovina	94
Seventh place
24 July
Great Britain	77
Georgia	41

== Final round ==
Quarterfinals
22 July
Montenegro	63
Poland	51
22 July
Croatia	69
Great Britain	53
22 July
Iceland	94
Georgia	54
22 July
Greece	77
Bosnia and Herzegovina	51

Semifinals
23 July
Montenegro	90
Croatia	74
23 July
Iceland	70
Greece	67

Final
24 July
Montenegro	78
Iceland	76
Third place
24 July
Croatia	67
Greece	73

=== Quarterfinals ===
22 July 2016

Montenegro	63–51	Poland

22 July 2016

Croatia	69–53	Great Britain

22 July 2016

Iceland	94–54	Georgia

22 July 2016

Greece	77–51	Bosnia and Herzegovina

=== Semifinals ===
23 July 2016

Montenegro	90–74	Croatia

23 July 2016

Iceland	70–67	Greece

=== Third place game ===
24 July 2016

Croatia	67–73	Greece

=== Final ===
24 July 2016
21:00

Montenegro	78–76 (OT)	Iceland
Scoring by quarter: 27–16, 14–13, 18–16, 12–26, Overtime: 7–5

Tasos Kampouris Hall, Chalkida
Attendance: 1000
Referees: Fernando Rocha (POR), Mykola Ambrosov (UKR), Ernad Karovic (BIH)

== Final standings ==
Rank	Team	Record
Gold medal	Montenegro	7–0
Silver medal	Iceland	5–2
Bronze medal	Greece	7–1
4th	Croatia	5–2
5th	Bosnia and Herzegovina	5–2
6th	Poland	4–3
7th	Great Britain	5–3
8th	Georgia	2–5
9th	Russia	5–2
10th	Romania	3–4
11th	Portugal	4–3
12th	Ireland	4–4
13th	Belarus	4–3
14th	Macedonia	2–5
15th	Netherlands	3–5
16th	Slovakia	1–6
17th	Armenia	3–3
18th	Bulgaria	3–4
19th	Estonia	1–5
20th	Kosovo	1–6
21st	Albania	0–6

== Awards ==
2016 FIBA Europe Under-20
Championship Division B winner

Montenegro
Second title

Most Valuable Player
(Greece) Vassilis Charalampopoulos

All-Tournament Team

- (Iceland) Kári Jónsson
- (Iceland) Jón Axel Guðmundsson
- (Croatia) Lovro Mazalin
- (Greece) Vassilis Charalampopoulos
- (Montenegro) Zoran Nikolić
