= Albania men's national under-20 basketball team =

Albania
- Joined FIBA: 1947
- FIBA zone: FIBA Europe
- National federation: Albanian Basketball Federation

U20 EuroBasket
- Appearances: None

U20 EuroBasket Division B
- Appearances: 11
- Medals: None

The Albania men's national under-20 basketball team is a national basketball team of Albania, administered by the Albanian Basketball Federation. It represents the country in international under-20 men's basketball competitions.

== FIBA U20 EuroBasket participations ==
Year	Result in Division B
2005	11th
2015	16th
2016	21st
2017	14th
2018	16th
2019	12th
2022	15th
2023	19th
2024	18th
2025	21st
2026	21st

== See also ==
- Albania men's national basketball team
- Albania men's national under-18 basketball team
- Albania women's national under-20 basketball team
