= Cyprus men's national under-20 basketball team =

Cyprus
- FIBA zone: FIBA Europe
- National federation: Cyprus Basketball Federation

U20 EuroBasket
- Appearances: None

U20 EuroBasket Division B
- Appearances: 3
- Medals: None

The Cyprus men's national under-20 basketball team is a national basketball team of Cyprus, administered by the Cyprus Basketball Federation. It represents the country in international under-20 men's basketball competitions.

== FIBA U20 EuroBasket participations ==
Year	Result in Division B
2013	11th
2014	8th
2026	14th

== See also ==
- Cyprus men's national basketball team
- Cyprus men's national under-18 basketball team
