= 2014 FIBA Europe Under-20 Championship Division B =

Tournament details
- Host country: Bosnia and Herzegovina
- City: Sarajevo
- Dates: 10–20 July 2014
- Teams: 14 (from 1 confederation)
- Venue(s): 2 (in 1 host city)

Final positions
- Champions: Bosnia and Herzegovina (1st title)
- Runners-up: Belgium
- Third place: Ukraine

Official website
- www.fibaeurope.com

The 2014 FIBA U20 European Championship Division B was the 10th edition of the Division B of the European basketball championship for men's national under-20 teams. It was played from 10 to 20 July 2014 in Sarajevo, Bosnia and Herzegovina.

== Participating teams ==
- Austria
- Belarus
- Belgium
- Bosnia and Herzegovina
- Cyprus
- Estonia ▼ (19th place, 2013 FIBA Europe Under-20 Championship Division A)
- Finland
- Georgia ▼ (20th place, 2013 FIBA Europe Under-20 Championship Division A)
- Luxembourg
- Netherlands
- Portugal
- Romania
- Switzerland
- Ukraine ▼ (18th place, 2013 FIBA Europe Under-20 Championship Division A)

== First round ==
In the first round, the teams were drawn into two groups of seven. The first two teams from each group advance to the semifinals; the third and fourth teams advance to the 5th–8th place playoffs; the fifth and sixth teams advance to the 9th–12th place playoffs; the last teams will play the 13th place match.

=== Group A ===
Pos	Team	Pld	W	L	PF	PA	PD	Pts	Qualification
1	Bosnia and Herzegovina	6	6	0	538	319	+219	12	Semifinals
2	Belgium	6	5	1	467	299	+168	11	Semifinals
3	Portugal	6	4	2	438	407	+31	10	5th–8th place playoffs
4	Cyprus	6	2	4	326	429	−103	8	5th–8th place playoffs
5	Romania	6	2	4	335	440	−105	8	9th–12th place playoffs
6	Estonia	6	1	5	354	473	−119	7	9th–12th place playoffs
7	Luxembourg	6	1	5	384	475	−91	7	13th place match

Source: FIBA Archive

10 July 2014

Boxscore

Romania	70–58	Estonia

Sarajevo

10 July 2014

Boxscore

Cyprus	48–89	Portugal

Sarajevo

10 July 2014

Boxscore

Belgium	50–71	Bosnia and Herzegovina

Sarajevo

11 July 2014

Boxscore

Portugal	82–64	Romania

Sarajevo

11 July 2014

Boxscore

Luxembourg	58–100	Belgium

Sarajevo

11 July 2014

Boxscore

Bosnia and Herzegovina	104–56	Cyprus

Sarajevo

12 July 2014

Boxscore

Cyprus	48–72	Luxembourg

Sarajevo

12 July 2014

Boxscore

Estonia	64–76	Portugal

Sarajevo

12 July 2014

Boxscore

Romania	40–96	Bosnia and Herzegovina

Sarajevo

14 July 2014

Boxscore

Belgium	58–41	Cyprus

Sarajevo

14 July 2014

Boxscore

Luxembourg	68–79	Romania

Sarajevo

14 July 2014

Boxscore

Bosnia and Herzegovina	95–57	Estonia

Sarajevo

15 July 2014

Boxscore

Romania	37–75	Belgium

Sarajevo

15 July 2014

Boxscore

Estonia	75–68	Luxembourg

Sarajevo

15 July 2014

Boxscore

Portugal	64–73	Bosnia and Herzegovina

Sarajevo

16 July 2014

Boxscore

Cyprus	61–45	Romania

Sarajevo

16 July 2014

Boxscore

Luxembourg	66–74	Portugal

Sarajevo

16 July 2014

Boxscore

Belgium	92–39	Estonia

Sarajevo

18 July 2014

Boxscore

Estonia	61–72	Cyprus

Sarajevo

18 July 2014

Boxscore

Portugal	53–92	Belgium

Sarajevo

18 July 2014

Boxscore

Bosnia and Herzegovina	99–52	Luxembourg

Sarajevo

=== Group B ===
Pos	Team	Pld	W	L	PF	PA	PD	Pts	Qualification
1	Belarus	6	5	1	489	394	+95	11	Semifinals
2	Ukraine	6	5	1	419	368	+51	11	Semifinals
3	Netherlands	6	5	1	391	356	+35	11	5th–8th place playoffs
4	Finland	6	2	4	433	421	+12	8	5th–8th place playoffs
5	Georgia	6	2	4	390	432	−42	8	9th–12th place playoffs
6	Austria	6	1	5	330	413	−83	7	9th–12th place playoffs
7	Switzerland	6	1	5	365	433	−68	7	13th place match

Source: FIBA Archive

10 July 2014

Boxscore

Georgia	56–75	Finland

Sarajevo

10 July 2014

Boxscore

Netherlands	57–54	Ukraine

Sarajevo

10 July 2014

Boxscore

Switzerland	41–65	Austria

Sarajevo

11 July 2014

Boxscore

Ukraine	75–58	Switzerland

Sarajevo

11 July 2014

Boxscore

Belarus	89–64	Netherlands

Sarajevo

11 July 2014

Boxscore

Austria	55–72	Georgia

Sarajevo

12 July 2014

Boxscore

Georgia	69–71	Ukraine

Sarajevo

12 July 2014

Boxscore

Finland	82–46	Austria

Sarajevo

12 July 2014

Boxscore

Switzerland	54–84	Belarus

Sarajevo

14 July 2014

Boxscore

Belarus	82–63	Georgia

Sarajevo

14 July 2014

Boxscore

Ukraine	79–59	Finland

Sarajevo

14 July 2014

Boxscore

Netherlands	52–49	Switzerland

Sarajevo

15 July 2014

Boxscore

Finland	73–85	Belarus

Sarajevo

15 July 2014

Boxscore

Austria	54–63	Ukraine

Sarajevo

15 July 2014

Boxscore

Georgia	51–73	Netherlands

Sarajevo

16 July 2014

Boxscore

Switzerland	76–79	Georgia

Sarajevo

16 July 2014

Boxscore

Belarus	78–63	Austria

Sarajevo

16 July 2014

Boxscore

Netherlands	68–66	Finland

Sarajevo

18 July 2014

Boxscore

Ukraine	77–71	Belarus

Sarajevo

18 July 2014

Boxscore

Austria	47–77	Netherlands

Sarajevo

18 July 2014

Boxscore

Finland	78–87	Switzerland

Sarajevo

== 13th place match ==
20 July 2014

Boxscore

Luxembourg	65–60	Switzerland

Sarajevo

== 9th−12th place playoffs ==
9th–12th place semifinals
A5	Romania	70
B6	Austria	68
B5	Georgia	60
A6	Estonia	52

9th place match
A5	Romania	66
B5	Georgia	50
11th place match
B6	Austria	52
A6	Estonia	51

=== 9th–12th place semifinals ===
19 July 2014

Boxscore

Romania	70–68	Austria

Sarajevo

19 July 2014

Boxscore

Georgia	60–52	Estonia

Sarajevo

=== 11th place match ===
20 July 2014

Boxscore

Austria	52–51	Estonia

Sarajevo

=== 9th place match ===
20 July 2014

Boxscore

Romania	66–50	Georgia

Sarajevo

== 5th−8th place playoffs ==
5th–8th place semifinals
A3	Portugal	75
B4	Finland	65
B3	Netherlands	69
A4	Cyprus	45

5th place match
A3	Portugal	65
B3	Netherlands	74
7th place match
B4	Finland	88
A4	Cyprus	52

=== 5th–8th place semifinals ===
19 July 2014

Boxscore

Portugal	75–65	Finland

Sarajevo

19 July 2014

Boxscore

Netherlands	69–45	Cyprus

Sarajevo

=== 7th place match ===
20 July 2014

Boxscore

Finland	88–52	Cyprus

Sarajevo

=== 5th place match ===
20 July 2014

Boxscore

Portugal	65–74	Netherlands

Sarajevo

== Championship playoffs ==
Semifinals
A1	Bosnia and Herzegovina	89
B2	Ukraine	71
B1	Belarus	70
A2	Belgium	91

Final
A1	Bosnia and Herzegovina	76
A2	Belgium	70
3rd place match
B2	Ukraine	77
B1	Belarus	62

=== Semifinals ===
19 July 2014

Boxscore

Bosnia and Herzegovina	89–71	Ukraine

Sarajevo

19 July 2014

Boxscore

Belarus	70–91	Belgium

Sarajevo

=== 3rd place match ===
20 July 2014

Boxscore

Ukraine	77–62	Belarus

Sarajevo

=== Final ===
20 July 2014

Boxscore

Bosnia and Herzegovina	76–70	Belgium

Sarajevo

== Final standings ==
Rank	Team
1st place, gold medalist(s)	Bosnia and Herzegovina
2nd place, silver medalist(s)	Belgium
3rd place, bronze medalist(s)	Ukraine
4	Belarus
5	Netherlands
6	Portugal
7	Finland
8	Cyprus
9	Romania
10	Georgia
11	Austria
12	Estonia
13	Luxembourg
14	Switzerland

Promoted to the 2015 FIBA Europe Under-20 Championship Division A

== See also ==
- 2014 FIBA Europe Under-20 Championship (Division A)
