= Luxembourg men's national under-20 basketball team =

Luxembourg
- FIBA zone: FIBA Europe
- National federation: Luxembourg Basketball Federation

U20 EuroBasket
- Appearances: None

U20 EuroBasket Division B
- Appearances: 11
- Medals: None

The Luxembourg men's national under-20 basketball team is a national basketball team of Luxembourg, administered by the Luxembourg Basketball Federation. It represents the country in international under-20 men's basketball competitions.

== FIBA U20 EuroBasket participations ==
| Year | Result in Division B |
|---|---|
| 2009 | 16th |
| 2011 | 22nd |
| 2012 | 17th |
| 2013 | 12th |
| 2014 | 13th |
| 2015 | 8th |

| Year | Result in Division B |
|---|---|
| 2018 | 19th |
| 2019 | 19th |
| 2022 | 18th |
| 2023 | 17th |
| 2026 | 6th |

== See also ==
- Luxembourg men's national basketball team
- Luxembourg men's national under-18 basketball team
- Luxembourg women's national under-20 basketball team
