= 2015 FIBA Europe Under-20 Championship for Women Division B =

Tournament details
- Host country: Montenegro
- City: Podgorica
- Dates: 2–12 July 2015
- Teams: 10 (from 1 confederation)
- Venue: 1 (in 1 host city)

Final positions
- Champions: Bosnia and Herzegovina (1st title)
- Runners-up: Greece
- Third place: Sweden

Official website
- archive.fiba.com

The 2015 FIBA Europe Under-20 Championship for Women Division B was the 11th edition of the Division B of the Women's European basketball championship for national under-20 teams. It was held in Podgorica, Montenegro, from 2 to 12 July 2015. Bosnia and Herzegovina women's national under-20 basketball team won the tournament.

== Participating teams ==
- Austria
- Bosnia and Herzegovina
- Bulgaria
- Great Britain
- Greece ▼ (16th place, 2014 FIBA Europe Under-20 Championship for Women Division A)
- Israel
- Lithuania
- Montenegro
- Romania
- Sweden ▼ (15th place, 2014 FIBA Europe Under-20 Championship for Women Division A)

== Final standings ==
| Pos | Team | Pld | W | L | PF | PA | PD | Pts | Promotion |
|---|---|---|---|---|---|---|---|---|---|
| 1 | Bosnia and Herzegovina | 9 | 9 | 0 | 738 | 523 | +215 | 18 | 2016 FIBA U20 Women's European Championship Division A |
| 2 | Greece | 9 | 6 | 3 | 618 | 552 | +66 | 15 | 2016 FIBA U20 Women's European Championship Division A |
| 3 | Sweden | 9 | 6 | 3 | 574 | 480 | +94 | 15 | 2016 FIBA U20 Women's European Championship Division A |
| 4 | Montenegro | 9 | 5 | 4 | 532 | 519 | +13 | 14 | |
| 5 | Lithuania | 9 | 5 | 4 | 595 | 523 | +72 | 14 | |
| 6 | Austria | 9 | 5 | 4 | 479 | 551 | −72 | 14 | |
| 7 | Bulgaria | 9 | 4 | 5 | 656 | 657 | −1 | 13 | |
| 8 | Israel | 9 | 3 | 6 | 505 | 558 | −53 | 12 | |
| 9 | Great Britain | 9 | 1 | 8 | 472 | 555 | −83 | 10 | |
| 10 | Romania | 9 | 1 | 8 | 471 | 722 | −251 | 10 | |

Source: FIBA Archive

== Results ==
2 July 2015

Boxscore

| Israel | 71–48 | Great Britain |

2 July 2015

Boxscore

| Sweden | 79–54 | Bulgaria |

2 July 2015

Boxscore

| Austria | 70–65 | Romania |

2 July 2015

Boxscore

| Montenegro | 66–45 | Lithuania |

2 July 2015

Boxscore

| Bosnia and Herzegovina | 79–71 | Greece |

3 July 2015

Boxscore

| Bulgaria | 67–50 | Israel |

3 July 2015

Boxscore

| Great Britain | 30–33 | Austria |

3 July 2015

Boxscore

| Lithuania | 53–73 | Sweden |

3 July 2015

Boxscore

| Romania | 44–84 | Greece |

3 July 2015

Boxscore

| Montenegro | 63–96 | Bosnia and Herzegovina |

4 July 2015

Boxscore

| Austria | 56–46 | Israel |

4 July 2015

Boxscore

| Bulgaria | 71–77 | Lithuania |

4 July 2015

Boxscore

| Greece | 60–52 | Great Britain |

4 July 2015

Boxscore

| Sweden | 46–77 | Bosnia and Herzegovina |

4 July 2015

Boxscore

| Romania | 43–74 | Montenegro |

6 July 2015

Boxscore

| Israel | 45–57 | Lithuania |

6 July 2015

Boxscore

| Austria | 59–56 | Greece |

6 July 2015

Boxscore

| Bosnia and Herzegovina | 83–64 | Bulgaria |

6 July 2015

Boxscore

| Great Britain | 56–58 | Montenegro |

6 July 2015

Boxscore

| Sweden | 66–38 | Romania |

7 July 2015

Boxscore

| Greece | 76–54 | Israel |

7 July 2015

Boxscore

| Lithuania | 68–73 | Bosnia and Herzegovina |

7 July 2015

Boxscore

| Montenegro | 51–58 | Austria |

7 July 2015

Boxscore

| Bulgaria | 92–94 | Romania |

7 July 2015

Boxscore

| Sweden | 61–56 | Great Britain |

8 July 2015

Boxscore

| Israel | 61–76 | Bosnia and Herzegovina |

8 July 2015

Boxscore

| Greece | 54–47 | Montenegro |

8 July 2015

Boxscore

| Romania | 28–101 | Lithuania |

8 July 2015

Boxscore

| Austria | 32–72 | Sweden |

8 July 2015

Boxscore

| Great Britain | 57–79 | Bulgaria |

10 July 2015

Boxscore

| Montenegro | 50–56 | Israel |

10 July 2015

Boxscore

| Bosnia and Herzegovina | 86–47 | Romania |

10 July 2015

Boxscore

| Sweden | 57–61 | Greece |

10 July 2015

Boxscore

| Lithuania | 56–49 | Great Britain |

10 July 2015

Boxscore

| Austria | 70–77 | Bulgaria |

11 July 2015

Boxscore

| Israel | 77–62 | Romania |

11 July 2015

Boxscore

| Montenegro | 64–54 | Sweden |

11 July 2015

Boxscore

| Great Britain | 52–87 | Bosnia and Herzegovina |

11 July 2015

Boxscore

| Greece | 88–95 | Bulgaria |

11 July 2015

Boxscore

| Lithuania | 73–50 | Austria |

12 July 2015

Boxscore

| Sweden | 66–45 | Israel |

12 July 2015

Boxscore

| Romania | 50–72 | Great Britain |

12 July 2015

Boxscore

| Bulgaria | 57–59 | Montenegro |

12 July 2015

Boxscore

| Bosnia and Herzegovina | 81–51 | Austria |

12 July 2015

Boxscore

| Greece | 68–65 | Lithuania |
