= 2014 FIBA Europe Under-20 Championship for Women Division B =

Tournament details
- Host country: Bulgaria
- City: Sofia
- Dates: 3–13 July 2014
- Teams: 10 (from 1 confederation)
- Venue: 1 (in 1 host city)

Final positions
- Champions: Germany (1st title)
- Runners-up: Hungary
- Third place: Portugal

Official website
- www.fibaeurope.com

The 2014 FIBA Europe Under-20 Championship for Women Division B was the 10th edition of the Division B of the Women's European basketball championship for national under-20 teams. It was held in Sofia, Bulgaria, from 3 to 13 July 2014. Germany women's national under-20 basketball team won the tournament.

== Participating teams ==
- Bosnia and Herzegovina
- Bulgaria
- Germany ▼ (14th place, 2013 FIBA Europe Under-20 Championship for Women Division A)
- Great Britain
- Hungary ▼ (15th place, 2013 FIBA Europe Under-20 Championship for Women Division A)
- Israel
- Lithuania ▼ (16th place, 2013 FIBA Europe Under-20 Championship for Women Division A)
- Norway
- Portugal
- Romania

== Final standings ==
Pos	Team	Pld	W	L	PF	PA	PD	Pts	Promotion
1	Germany	9	8	1	637	473	+164	17	2015 FIBA Europe Under-20 Championship for Women Division A
2	Hungary	9	8	1	698	525	+173	17	2015 FIBA Europe Under-20 Championship for Women Division A
3	Portugal	9	7	2	588	471	+117	16	2015 FIBA Europe Under-20 Championship for Women Division A
4	Lithuania	9	5	4	510	537	−27	14	
5	Bosnia and Herzegovina	9	5	4	654	524	+130	14	
6	Bulgaria	9	4	5	625	603	+22	13	
7	Great Britain	9	4	5	541	538	+3	13	
8	Israel	9	3	6	555	605	−50	12	
9	Norway	9	1	8	380	636	−256	10	
10	Romania	9	0	9	414	690	−276	9	

Source: FIBA Archive

== Results ==
3 July 2014

Boxscore

Bosnia and Herzegovina	48–56	Lithuania

3 July 2014

Boxscore

Romania	47–74	Portugal

3 July 2014

Boxscore

Hungary	71–79	Germany

3 July 2014

Boxscore

Israel	62–91	Bulgaria

3 July 2014

Boxscore

Norway	32–47	Great Britain

4 July 2014

Boxscore

Portugal	60–69	Hungary

4 July 2014

Boxscore

Bulgaria	73–53	Norway

4 July 2014

Boxscore

Germany	66–48	Israel

4 July 2014

Boxscore

Lithuania	60–58	Great Britain

4 July 2014

Boxscore

Bosnia and Herzegovina	112–53	Romania

5 July 2014

Boxscore

Norway	23–72	Germany

5 July 2014

Boxscore

Hungary	70–67	Bosnia and Herzegovina

5 July 2014

Boxscore

Israel	39–64	Portugal

5 July 2014

Boxscore

Romania	42–61	Lithuania

5 July 2014

Boxscore

Great Britain	70–75	Bulgaria

7 July 2014

Boxscore

Portugal	74–32	Norway

7 July 2014

Boxscore

Germany	69–58	Great Britain

7 July 2014

Boxscore

Lithuania	74–71	Bulgaria

7 July 2014

Boxscore

Bosnia and Herzegovina	72–51	Israel

7 July 2014

Boxscore

Romania	41–82	Hungary

8 July 2014

Boxscore

Israel	89–57	Romania

8 July 2014

Boxscore

Hungary	68–44	Lithuania

8 July 2014

Boxscore

Norway	47–94	Bosnia and Herzegovina

8 July 2014

Boxscore

Great Britain	58–57	Portugal

8 July 2014

Boxscore

Bulgaria	66–69	Germany

9 July 2014

Boxscore

Bosnia and Herzegovina	60–53	Great Britain

9 July 2014

Boxscore

Portugal	64–61	Bulgaria

9 July 2014

Boxscore

Lithuania	49–82	Germany

9 July 2014

Boxscore

Romania	45–52	Norway

9 July 2014

Boxscore

Hungary	85–63	Israel

11 July 2014

Boxscore

Germany	57–61	Portugal

11 July 2014

Boxscore

Norway	51–85	Hungary

11 July 2014

Boxscore

Great Britain	75–45	Romania

11 July 2014

Boxscore

Bulgaria	54–85	Bosnia and Herzegovina

11 July 2014

Boxscore

Israel	62–58	Lithuania

12 July 2014

Boxscore

Hungary	79–56	Great Britain

12 July 2014

Boxscore

Bosnia and Herzegovina	50–68	Germany

12 July 2014

Boxscore

Romania	37–70	Bulgaria

12 July 2014

Boxscore

Lithuania	42–62	Portugal

12 July 2014

Boxscore

Israel	80–46	Norway

13 July 2014

Boxscore

Bulgaria	64–89	Hungary

13 July 2014

Boxscore

Great Britain	66–61	Israel

13 July 2014

Boxscore

Norway	44–66	Lithuania

13 July 2014

Boxscore

Germany	75–47	Romania

13 July 2014

Boxscore

Portugal	72–66	Bosnia and Herzegovina
