= Armenia men's national under-20 basketball team =

Armenia
- FIBA zone: FIBA Europe
- National federation: Armenian Basketball Federation

U20 EuroBasket
- Appearances: None

U20 EuroBasket Division B
- Appearances: 8
- Medals: None

The Armenia men's national under-20 basketball team is a national basketball team of Armenia, administered by the Armenian Basketball Federation. It represents the country in international under-20 men's basketball competitions.

== FIBA U20 EuroBasket participations ==
Year	Result in Division B
2015	12th
2016	17th
2017	17th
2018	21st
2019	21st
2024	19th
2025	16th
2026	20th

== See also ==
- Armenia men's national basketball team
- Armenia men's national under-18 basketball team
- Armenia women's national under-20 basketball team
