= Kosovo men's national under-20 basketball team =

Kosovo
- Joined FIBA: 2015
- FIBA zone: FIBA Europe
- National federation: Basketball Federation of Kosovo
- Coach: Andin Rashica
- Nickname: Dardanët (Dardanians)

U20 EuroBasket
- Appearances: None

U20 EuroBasket Division B
- Appearances: 10
- Medals: None
Home	Away

The Kosovo men's national under-20 basketball team (Albanian: Përfaqësuesja e basketbollit të Kosovës nën 20 vjeç, Serbian: Кошаркашкa репрезентација Косова до 20. године, romanized: Košarkaška reprezentacija Kosova do 20. godine) is a national basketball team of Kosovo, administered by the Basketball Federation of Kosovo, the governing body for basketball in Kosovo. It represents the country in international under-20 men's basketball competitions.

== FIBA U20 EuroBasket participations ==
Year	Result in Division B
2015	14th
2016	20th
2017	12th
2018	18th
2019	18th
2022	12th
2023	11th
2024	16th
2025	8th
2026	18th

== See also ==
- Kosovo men's national basketball team
- Kosovo men's national under-18 basketball team
- Kosovo women's national under-20 basketball team
