= 2005 FIBA Europe Under-20 Championship Division B =

1st Division B Championship

Tournament details
- Host country: Bulgaria
- Dates: July 8–17
- Teams: 12 (from 48 federations)
- Venue: 1 (in 1 host city)

Final positions
- Champions: Bulgaria (1st title)

Tournament statistics
- Top scorer: (Belgium) Tabu-Eboma (22.0)
- Top rebounds: (Hungary) Lóránt (12.5)
- Top assists: (Portugal) Pires (5.0)
- PPG (Team): Belgium (87.3)
- RPG (Team): Bulgaria (45.5)
- APG (Team): Portugal (11.1)

The 2005 FIBA Europe Under-20 Championship Division B was the first edition of the Division B of the FIBA Europe Under-20 Championship, the second-tier level of European Under-20 basketball. The city of Varna, in Bulgaria, hosted the tournament. Bulgaria won their first title.

Bulgaria and Hungary were promoted to Division A.

== Teams ==
- Albania
- Belgium
- Bulgaria
- Finland
- Georgia
- Hungary
- Iceland
- Ireland
- Poland
- Portugal
- Slovakia
- Sweden

== Preliminary round ==
The twelve teams were allocated in two groups of six teams each.

| Team advanced to Quarter-FinalS |
| Team competed in 9th–12th playoffs |

=== Group A ===
| Team | Pld | W | L | PF | PA | Pts | Tie-breaker |
|---|---|---|---|---|---|---|---|
| Poland | 5 | 5 | 0 | 433 | 319 | 10 | |
| Georgia | 5 | 3 | 2 | 377 | 344 | 8 | +9 |
| Slovakia | 5 | 3 | 2 | 392 | 360 | 8 | 0 |
| Finland | 5 | 3 | 2 | 392 | 360 | 8 | −9 |
| Ireland | 5 | 1 | 4 | 345 | 387 | 6 | |
| Iceland | 5 | 0 | 5 | 282 | 451 | 5 | |

8 July 2005
| Finland | 80–58 | Ireland | Varna |
| Poland | 77–68 | Slovakia | Varna |
| Iceland | 58–85 | Georgia | Varna |
9 July 2005
| Slovakia | 86–59 | Iceland | Varna |
| Georgia | 73–58 | Finland | Varna |
| Ireland | 71–82 | Poland | Varna |
10 July 2005
| Finland | 86–80 | Slovakia | Varna |
| Georgia | 88–64 | Ireland | Varna |
| Iceland | 50–97 | Poland | Varna |
12 July 2005
| Slovakia | 71–65 | Georgia | Varna |
| Ireland | 79–50 | Iceland | Varna |
| Poland | 84–64 | Finland | Varna |
13 July 2005
| Slovakia | 87–73 | Ireland | Varna |
| Georgia | 66–93 | Poland | Varna |
| Finland | 104–65 | Iceland | Varna |

=== Group B ===
| Team | Pld | W | L | PF | PA | Pts |
|---|---|---|---|---|---|---|
| Hungary | 5 | 4 | 1 | 418 | 346 | 9 |
| Bulgaria | 5 | 4 | 1 | 439 | 390 | 9 |
| Belgium | 5 | 3 | 2 | 427 | 347 | 8 |
| Sweden | 5 | 2 | 3 | 349 | 357 | 7 |
| Portugal | 5 | 2 | 3 | 338 | 347 | 7 |
| Albania | 5 | 0 | 5 | 311 | 495 | 5 |

8 July 2005
| Hungary | 106–58 | Albania | Varna |
| Sweden | 62–76 | Bulgaria | Varna |
| Portugal | 60–82 | Belgium | Varna |
9 July 2005
| Albania | 65–83 | Sweden | Varna |
| Belgium | 69–80 | Hungary | Varna |
| Bulgaria | 82–80 | Portugal | Varna |
10 July 2005
| Belgium | 114–60 | Albania | Varna |
| Portugal | 55–70 | Sweden | Varna |
| Hungary | 106–98 | Bulgaria | Varna |
12 July 2005
| Sweden | 60–70 | Hungary | Varna |
| Albania | 57–82 | Portugal | Varna |
| Bulgaria | 73–71 | Belgium | Varna |
13 July 2005
| Hungary | 56–61 | Portugal | Varna |
| Bulgaria | 110–71 | Albania | Varna |
| Belgium | 91–74 | Sweden | Varna |

== Knockout stage ==
=== 9th–12th playoffs ===
Playoffs
July 15, Varna
Iceland | 62
Portugal | 114
July 15, Varna
Ireland | 104
Albania | 83

Ninth place
July 16, Varna
Portugal | 82
Ireland | 73
Eleventh place
July 16, Varna
Iceland | 92
Albania | 95

=== Championship ===
Quarterfinals
July 15, Varna
Finland | 73
Hungary | 81
July 15, Varna
Georgia | 89
Belgium | 78
July 15, Varna
Sweden | 70
Poland | 85
July 15, Varna
Bulgaria | 76
Slovakia | 65

Semifinals
July 16, Varna
Hungary | 71
Georgia | 69
July 16, Varna
Poland | 82
Bulgaria | 95

Final
July 17, Varna
Hungary | 80
Bulgaria | 86
Third place
July 17, Varna
Georgia | 76
Poland | 96

==== 5th–8th playoffs ====
Playoffs
July 16, Varna
Finland | 83
Belgium | 100
July 16, Varna
Sweden | 66
Slovakia | 73

Fifth place
July 17, Varna
Belgium | 93
Slovakia | 72
Seventh place
July 17, Varna
Finland | 76
Sweden | 79

2005 FIBA Europe U-20 Championship Division B

Bulgaria
First title

== Final standings ==
| Rank | Team |
|---|---|
| Gold medal | Bulgaria |
| Silver medal | Hungary |
| Bronze medal | Poland |
| 4th | Georgia |
| 5th | Belgium |
| 6th | Slovakia |
| 7th | Sweden |
| 8th | Finland |
| 9th | Portugal |
| 10th | Ireland |
| 11th | Albania |
| 12th | Iceland |

== Stats leaders ==
=== Points ===
| Rank | Name | Points | Games | PPG |
|---|---|---|---|---|
| 1. | (Belgium) Beye Tabu-Eboma | 110 | 5 | 22.0 |
| 2. | (Republic of Ireland) John Behan | 128 | 7 | 18.3 |
| 2. | (Republic of Ireland) Aaron Westbrooks | 124 | 7 | 17.7 |
| 4. | (Poland) Kamil Chanas | 141 | 8 | 17.6 |
| 5. | (Bulgaria) Kaloyan Ivanov | 140 | 8 | 17.5 |

=== Rebounds ===
| Rank | Name | Points | Games | RPG |
|---|---|---|---|---|
| 1. | (Hungary) Péter Lóránt | 100 | 8 | 12.5 |
| 2. | (Bulgaria) Kaloyan Ivanov | 94 | 8 | 11.8 |
| 3. | (Poland) Pawel Leonczyk | 86 | 8 | 10.8 |
| 4. | (Belgium) Francois Lhoest | 77 | 8 | 9.6 |
| 5. | (Belgium) Stéphane Moris | 76 | 8 | 9.5 |

=== Assists ===
| Rank | Name | Points | Games | RPG |
|---|---|---|---|---|
| 1. | (Portugal) Antonio Pires | 28 | 7 | 4.0 |
| 2. | (Georgia (country)) Giorgi Tsintsadze | 25 | 8 | 3.1 |
| 3. | (Sweden) Thomas Massamba | 24 | 8 | 3.0 |
| 4. | (Belgium) Beye Tabu-Eboma | 14 | 5 | 2.8 |
| 5. | (Belgium) Domien Loubry | 22 | 8 | 2.8 |
