= Azerbaijan men's national under-20 basketball team =

U20 Basketball national team

Azerbaijan
- FIBA zone: FIBA Europe
- National federation: Azerbaijan Basketball Federation

U20 EuroBasket
- Appearances: None

U20 EuroBasket Division B
- Appearances: 6
- Medals: None

The Azerbaijan men's national under-20 basketball team is a national basketball team of Azerbaijan, administered by the Azerbaijan Basketball Federation. It represents the country in international under-20 men's basketball competitions.

== FIBA U20 EuroBasket participations ==
Year	Result in Division B
2008	19th
2017	19th
2018	20th
2023	20th
2024	20th
2026	11th

== See also ==
- Azerbaijan men's national basketball team
- Azerbaijan men's national under-18 basketball team
