= Jurij Macura =

Slovenian basketball player

Free Agent
- Position: Power forward / center

Personal information
- Born: December 23, 1999 (age 26) Ljubljana, Slovenia
- Listed height: 211 cm (6 ft 11 in)
- Listed weight: 110 kg (243 lb)

Career information
- NBA draft: 2021: undrafted
- Playing career: 2016–present

Career history
- 2016–2021: Baskonia
- 2016–2019: → Baskonia B
- 2019–2020: → Mega Bemax
- 2020: → Koper Primorska
- 2021: → FMP
- 2021–2024: Krka

Jurij Macura (born December 23, 1999) is a Slovenian professional, basketball player, last played for Krka of the AdmiralBet ABA League First Division. He is a 2.11 m tall power forward and center.

== Professional career ==
On June 10, 2019, Macura signed for Serbian team Mega Bemax.

On August 8, 2020, Macura was loaned to Koper Primorska for the 2020–21 season. In December 2020, Koper Primorska was disqualified from the ABA League and disbanded. Afterwards, he joined Serbian team FMP for the rest of the season.

On July 22, 2021, Macura signed with Krka of the Slovenian League.

== National team career ==
Macura made a debut for the Slovenia national team during the 2019 FIBA World Cup qualifications.
