= Łukasz Kolenda =

Polish basketball player (born 1999)

- Kolenda with Manresa in 2026

No. 1 – Bàsquet Manresa
- Position: Point guard
- League: Liga ACB; EuroCup

Personal information
- Born: 28 July 1999 (age 27) Ełk, Poland
- Listed height: 1.96 m (6 ft 5 in)

Career information
- NBA draft: 2021: undrafted
- Playing career: 2012–present

Career history
- 2012–2021: Trefl Sopot
- 2021–2024: Śląsk Wrocław
- 2024–2025: Arka Gdynia
- 2025–2026: Rostock Seawolves
- 2026–present: Manresa

Career highlights
- PLK champion (2022)

Łukasz Kolenda is a Polish professional basketball player for Bàsquet Manresa of the Liga ACB and the EuroCup. Standing at 1.96 m, he plays Point guard position.

== Professional career ==
Łukasz Kolenda joined Trefl Sopot in 2012.

In the 2020–21 PLK season, his team finished 5th and exceeded expectations. The quarter-finals series against Śląsk Wrocław was Kolenda's first playoff experience. Yet, he was not able to prevent his team from falling 1-3 overall. For the series, Kolenda praised the defense tactics of the opponent's head coach Oliver Vidin.

In April 2021, Łukasz Kolenda's contract with Trefl Sopot expired.

On July 9, 2021, he has signed with Śląsk Wrocław of the PLK.

On July 20, 2024, he signed with Arka Gdynia of the Polish Basketball League (PLK).

On July 1, 2025, he signed with Rostock Seawolves of the Basketball Bundesliga (BBL).

On June 19, 2026, he signed with Bàsquet Manresa of the Liga ACB.

== National team ==
Kolenda has been a member of the Polish national team.
