= Aljaž Bratec =

Slovenian basketball player

KD Ježica
- Position: Point guard / shooting guard
- League: 2. SKL

Personal information
- Born: May 31, 1998 (age 27) Ljubljana, Slovenia
- Listed height: 1.93 m (6 ft 4 in)

Career information
- NBA draft: 2020: undrafted
- Playing career: 2015–present

Career history
- 2015–2022: Helios Suns
- 2015-2016: →Helios Suns mladi
- 2022–present: KD Ježica

Aljaž Bratec (born May 31, 1998) is a Slovenian professional basketball player for KD Ježica of the 2. SKL. He is a 1.92 m tall combo guard.

== Professional career ==
Bratec started playing professional basketball for Helios Suns Domžale.

== International career ==
Bratec made his debut for the Slovenian national team on September 14, 2018, at the 2019 FIBA Basketball World Cup qualification game against Latvia national team.
