= Gopass Arena =

Arena in Bratislava, Slovakia

Gopass aréna
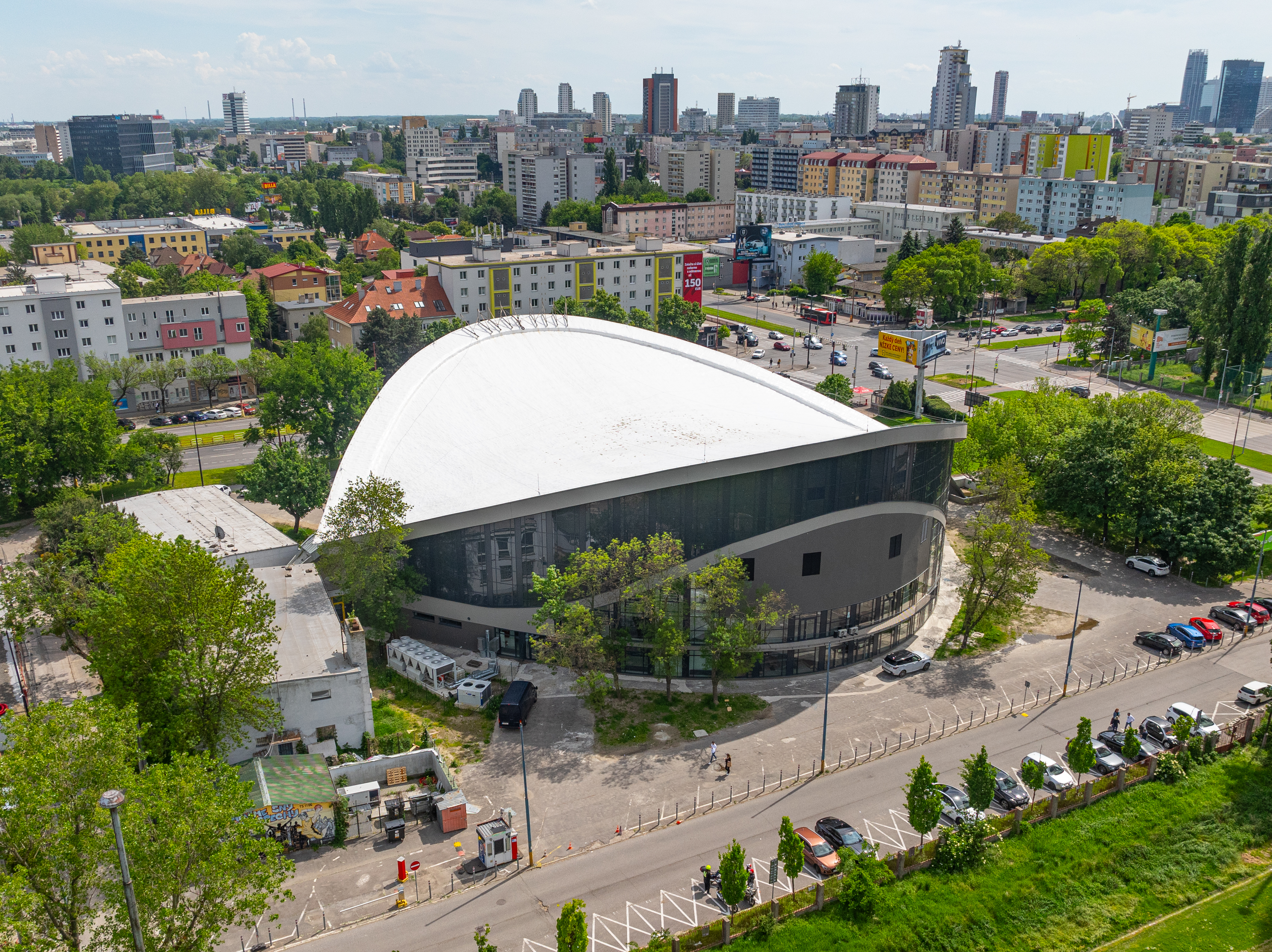
- Interactive map of Gopass aréna
- Former names: Hala Pasienky; Hant Arena; Eurovia Arena
- Address: Bratislava 3, Bratislava Region, Nové Mesto
- Location: Bratislava, Slovakia
- Coordinates: 48.1624°N 17.1414°E
- Capacity: 3,200

Construction
- Opened: 1962
- Architect: Jozef Chovanec

Gopass Arena (Slovak: Gopass aréna) (formerly known as Hala Pasienky, Hant Arena and Eurovia Arena) is a multi-use arena in Bratislava. The arena has distinct shape made of two crossing parabolic arches covered by a suspended rope structure.

== Construction ==
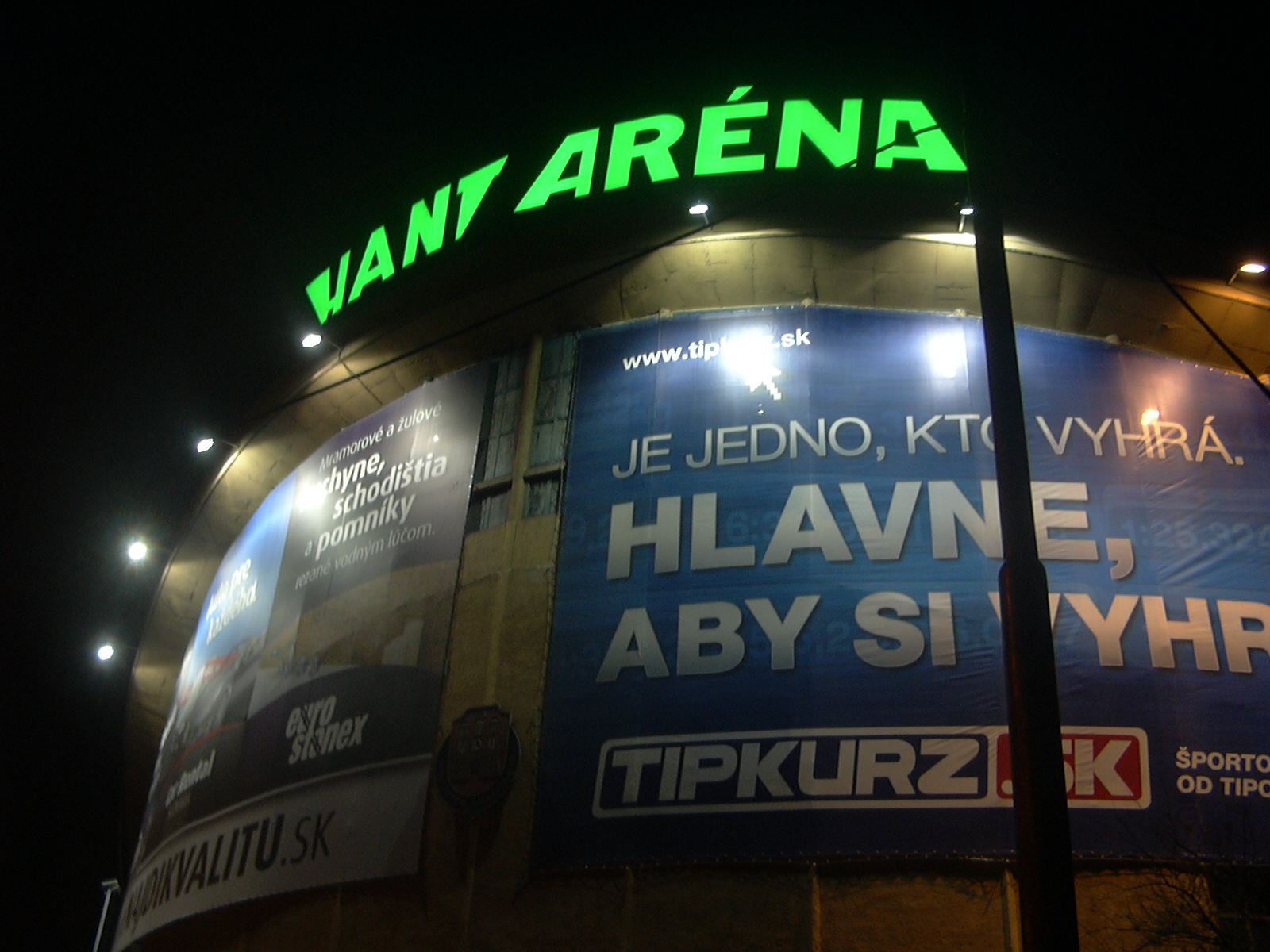
A close-up view of Hant Arena from the outside at night

When the need to build a new sports hall was considered in the 1950s, even the architect of the proposal, Jozef Chovanec, did not expect that its construction would cause such a strong response and would be part of the scene of Slovak architecture to this day.

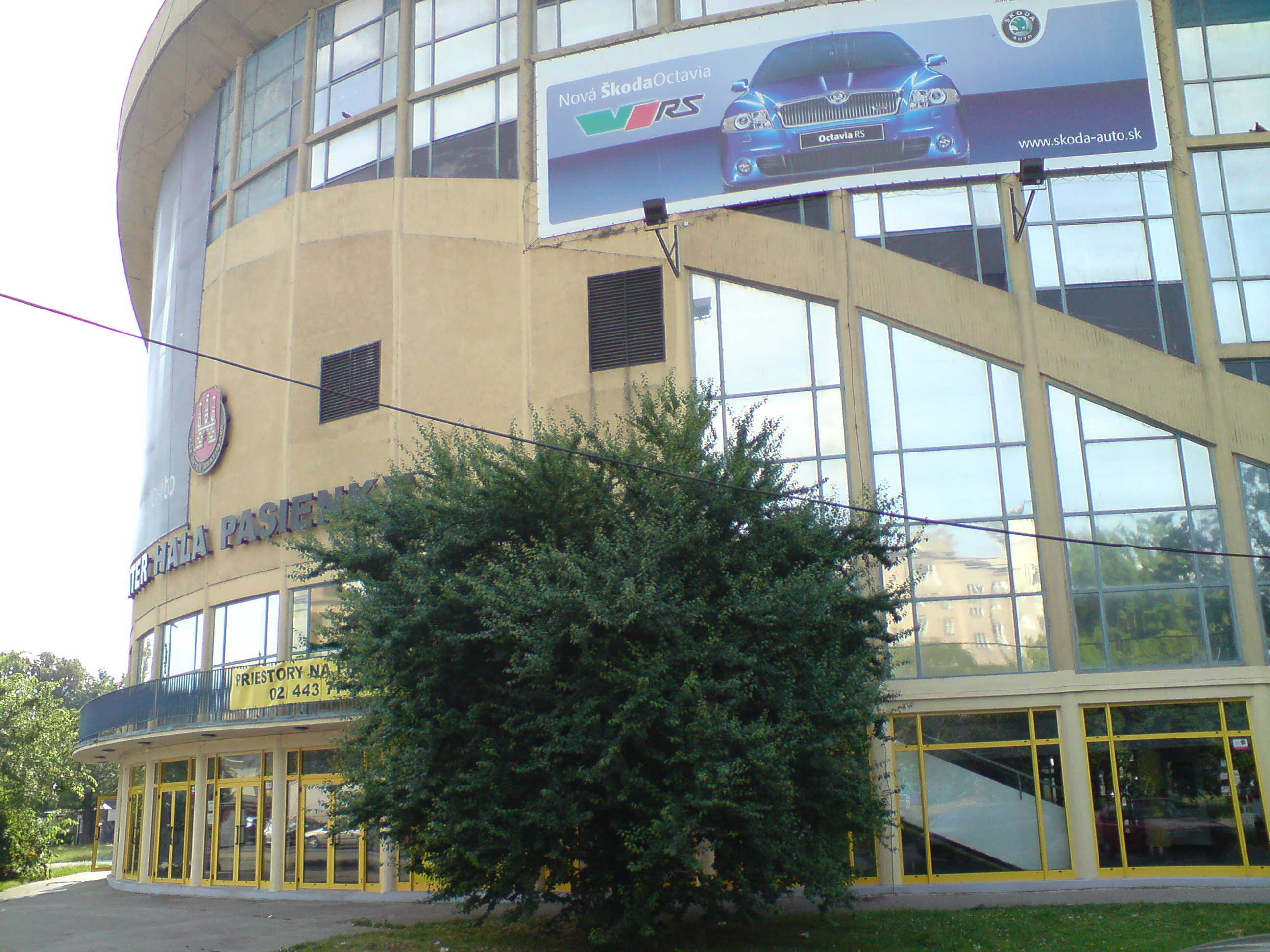

The building was created in 1962 and the architecture was considered too bold, too complicated, too progressive. During these year, a lot of constructions were built via prefabrication. The construction of the Hant Arena, which is a partial copy of the Dorton Arena in Raleigh, USA, was challenging, provocative and elegant at the same time. The construction was planned in 1958, for capacity of 3,200 seats in the auditorium, but after additional adjustments to the plan, the number went up to 4,500 seat . For sports events, that require a playing area, or an area for placing a stage, is not so significant, it is possible to reach a capacity of up to 4,500 watching spectators in the auditorium of the hall.

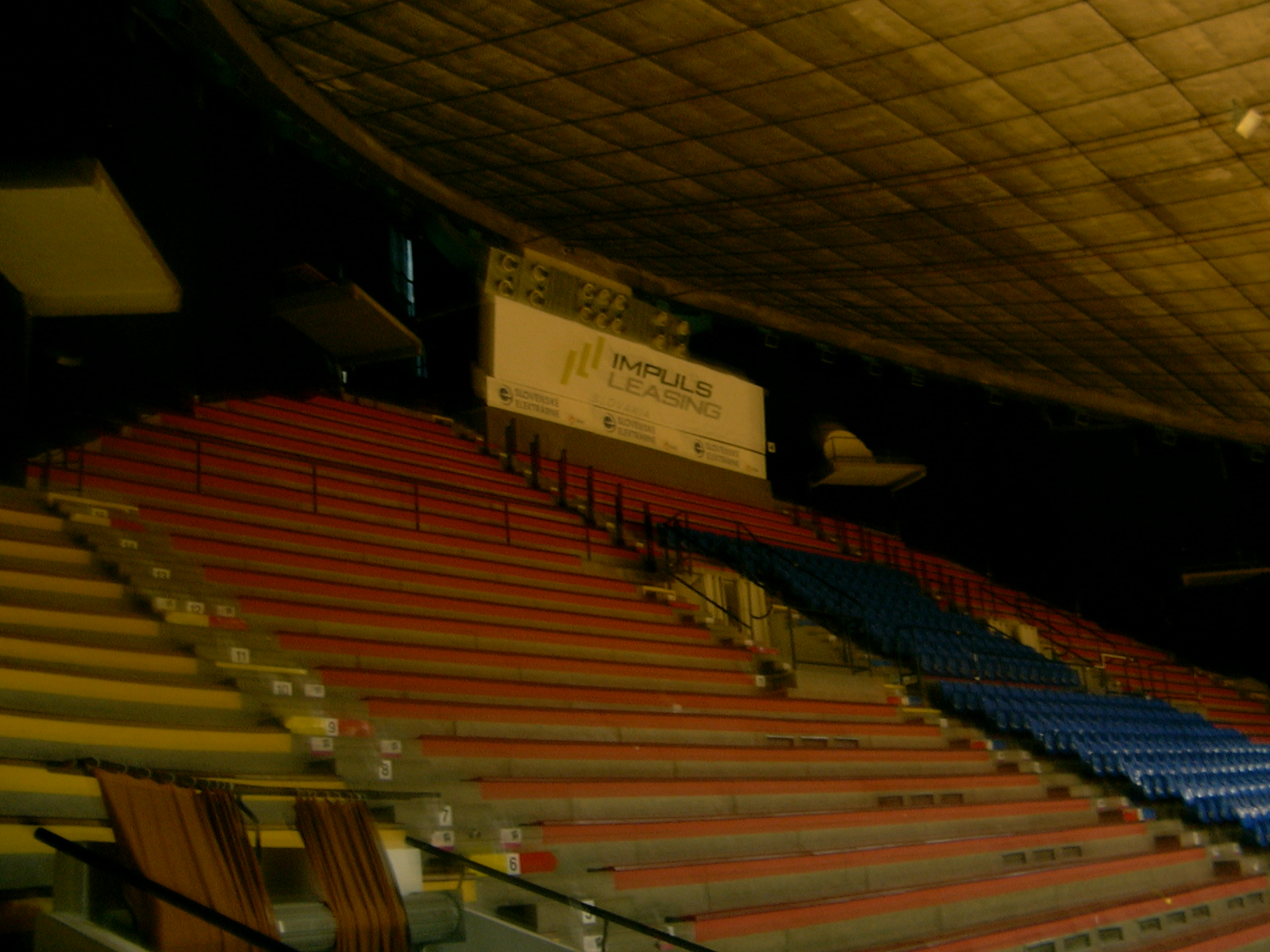
One of the stands

The Projekt magazine from 1962 mentions, among others, the suitable location of locations for television broadcasts:

"For film and television, raised platforms are placed around the perimeter of the auditorium, which allows undisturbed filming of sports events. They guarantee good visibility of the playing surface as well as the electrical timing board and the scoreboard."

The structure of the hall belongs to the buildings whose shape is determined by their static effect, which dominates the overall design. Its elegance lies in the statically artfully devised construction system, and it can therefore be considered primarily as an engineering work forming "dramatic architecture".

The Pasienky sports hall was designed and constructed about 50 years ago - with modern means, a modern approach, modern versatility. The hall does not belong to the sixties. It is timeless, still up-to-date, still used and works well.

On 14 December 2019, Czech Petr Vondráček faced Slovak Samuel Krištofič under Lethwei rules at the arena. The match was declared a draw under traditional rules and marked the first Lethwei fight in Bratislava.

== Notable events ==
- 1967 FIBA World Championship for Women
- 2017 Women's World Floorball Championships
- 2019 FIBA Basketball World Cup qualification
- XFN in 2019, showcased a Lethwei fight for the first time in Bratislava

== See also ==
- Niké Aréna
- NTC Arena
