= Azerbaijan Basketball Federation =

Governing body of basketball

- Founded: 12 March 1993
- Affiliation: FIBA
- Affiliation date: 1994
- Regional affiliation: FIBA Europe
- Headquarters: Baku
- President: Emin Amrullayev

Official website
- aze.basketball

The Azerbaijan Basketball Federation (Azerbaijani: Azərbaycan Basketbol Federasiyası), also known as ABF, is the national governing body of basketball in Azerbaijan. It was founded on 12 March 1993, and is headquartered in Baku.

The Azerbaijan Basketball Federation operates the Azerbaijan men's national team and Azerbaijan women's national team. They organize national competitions in Azerbaijan, for both the men's and women's senior teams and also the youth national basketball teams.

The top professional league in Azerbaijan is the Azerbaijan Basketball League.

== See also ==
- Azerbaijan men's national basketball team
- Azerbaijan men's national under-20 basketball team
- Azerbaijan men's national under-18 basketball team
- Azerbaijan men's national under-16 basketball team
- Azerbaijan women's national basketball team
