= Polish Basketball Federation =

Governing body for basketball in Poland

Polish Basketball Federation Polski Związek Koszykówki
- Sport: Basketball
- Jurisdiction: Poland
- Abbreviation: PZKosz
- Founded: 1928; 98 years ago as PZGS; 1957; 69 years ago as PZKosz.
- Affiliation: FIBA
- Affiliation date: 1934; 92 years ago
- Regional affiliation: FIBA Europe
- Affiliation date: 1957; 69 years ago
- Headquarters: Warsaw
- President: Radosław Piesiewicz

Official website
- pzkosz.pl
- (Poland)

The Polish Basketball Federation (Polish: Polski Związek Koszykówki; abbreviated to PZKosz), is a governing body for basketball in Poland. It directs and oversees all of the basketball national teams of Poland, including both the junior and senior national teams of both men and women.

== History ==
The Polish Association of Sports Games was founded in 1928, and became a member of FIBA in 1934. In 1957, the Polish Basketball Federation was then founded.
