= Basketball Federation of Bosnia and Herzegovina =

- Sport: Basketball
- Jurisdiction: Bosnia and Herzegovina
- Abbreviation: KSBIH
- Founded: April 3, 1950 (until 1993, part of Basketball Federation of Yugoslavia)
- Affiliation: FIBA
- Affiliation date: 1993
- Regional affiliation: FIBA Europe
- Headquarters: Sarajevo
- President: Boris Spasojević
- Vice president(s): Sejo Bukva; Miloš Dalibor
- Secretary: Dubravko Barbarić
- Men's coach: Adis Bećiragić
- Women's coach: Goran Lojo
- Sponsor: BH Telecom; Telemach; Elektroprivreda BiH; USAID
- Replaced: Basketball Federation of Yugoslavia (1948–1992)

Official website
- basket.ba
- (Bosnia and Herzegovina)

Basketball Federation of Bosnia and Herzegovina (Košarkaški savez Bosne i Hercegovine / Кошаркашки савез Босне и Херцеговине) is the highest basketball governing body in Bosnia and Herzegovina. It organizes the Bosnian basketball championship, the Bosnia and Herzegovina national basketball team, for men and women, senior and youth categories.

== History ==
Basketball came to Bosnia and Herzegovina in 1929. The Basketball Federation was founded on April 3, 1950 as a part of the Yugoslav Federation. As a part of former Yugoslavia, many Bosnian players and coaches were part of medal winning teams in the FIBA World Championship, Eurobasket and Olympic Basketball Tournament. KK Bosna won Yugoslav championship titles in men's, and ŽKK Željezničar Sarajevo and KK Jedinstvo Tuzla in women's categories. Bosna and Jedinstvo Tuzla also won a European Champions' Cup (now known as Euroleague) in 1979 and 1989, respectively.

== Independent Bosnia and Herzegovina ==
Since Bosnia and Herzegovina gained independence, the Basketball Federation has transformed into the sport's national governing body. It was accepted by FIBA on September 15, 1992. There are close to 150 basketball clubs in Bosnia and Herzegovina, with more than 5,000 registered players.

The Basketball Federation is the organizer of the national championship and cup competitions. As a result of war, three separated championships and cups were played until the late 1990s. They were organized according to ethnic divisions. In 1998. joint playoffs were first organized, and today one league is being played in the country.
