= 2012 FIBA Europe Under-16 Championship =

International basketball competition

2012 FIBA U16 European Championship
26th FIBA Under-16 European Basketball Championship

Tournament details
- Host countries: Latvia; Lithuania
- Dates: 19 – 29 July 2012
- Teams: 16
- Venue(s): 3 (in 3 host cities)

Final positions
- Champions: Turkey (3rd title)

Tournament statistics
- MVP: (Turkey) Okben Ulubay
- Top scorer: (Czech Republic) Svoboda (19.7)
- Top rebounds: (Lithuania) Sabonis (14.4)
- Top assists: (Lithuania) Zupkauskas (6.9)
- PPG (Team): Croatia (74.8)
- RPG (Team): Russia (45.1)
- APG (Team): Lithuania (16.8)

Official website
- 2012 – DIVISION A (archive)

The 2012 FIBA Europe Under-16 Championship was the 26th edition of the FIBA Europe Under-16 Championship. 16 teams featured in the competition, which was held in Latvia and Lithuania, from 19 to 29 July 2012. Turkey won the title for the third time.

== Participating teams ==
- Croatia
- Czech Republic
- England ▲ (runners-up, 2011 FIBA Europe Under-16 Championship Division B)
- France
- Germany
- Greece
- Italy
- Latvia
- Lithuania
- Poland
- Russia
- Serbia
- Slovenia ▲ (winners, 2011 FIBA Europe Under-16 Championship Division B)
- Spain
- Turkey
- Ukraine

== Group stages ==
=== First round ===
In this round, the sixteen teams are allocated in four groups of four teams each. The top three advanced to the qualifying round. The last team of each group played for the 13th–16th place in the Classification Games.

Team advances to the second round
Team will compete in the classification round

Times given below are in CEST (UTC+2).

==== Group A ====
Team	Pld	W	L	PF	PA	PD	Pts
Italy	3	3	0	215	178	+37	6
Turkey	3	2	1	247	224	+23	5
Croatia	3	1	2	236	229	+7	4
England	3	0	3	157	224	−67	3

19 July 2012
14:00

Report

Turkey	81–56	England
Scoring by quarter: 18–15, 15–10, 20–12, 28–19
Pts: Baykan 12; Rebs: Alemdaroğlu 12; Asts: Uğurlu, Geçim 4		Pts: Dang 13; Rebs: Oghide 9 Asts: Dang 8

Olympic Center Ventspils, Ventspils LAT
Attendance: 100
Referees: Boris Schmidt (GER), Matej Spendl (SLO), Petr Hrusa (CZE)

19 July 2012
16:15

Report

Italy	77–63	Croatia
Scoring by quarter: 13–23, 21–11, 16–15, 27–14
Pts: Oliva 27; Rebs: Oliva 13; Asts: Mussini 3		Pts: Arapovic 22; Rebs: Arapovic 10; Asts: Arapovic 5

Olympic Center Ventspils, Ventspils LAT
Attendance: 200
Referees: Ioannis Foufis (GRE), Gentian Cici (ALB), Martynas Gudas (LTU)

20 July 2012
16:15

Report

Croatia	95–98 (OT)	Turkey
Scoring by quarter: 26–15, 18–30, 20–18, 25–26, Overtime: 6–9
Pts: Arapovic 32; Rebs: Arapovic 13; Asts: Mazalin 7		Pts: Güven 24; Rebs: Bayram 7 Asts: Uğurlu, Geçim 6

Olympic Center Ventspils, Ventspils LAT
Attendance: 150
Referees: Milivoje Jovcic (SRB), Ioannis Foufis (GRE), Gentian Cici (ALB)

20 July 2012
14:00

Report

England	47–65	Italy
Scoring by quarter: 11–21, 14–17, 12–16, 10–11
Pts: Dang 17; Rebs: Dang 8 Asts: Dang 3		Pts: Donzelli 15; Rebs: Donzelli 11; Asts: Oliva 2

Olympic Center Ventspils, Ventspils LAT
Attendance: 150
Referees: David Chambon (FRA), Petr Hrusa (CZE), Alin Faur (ROU)

21 July 2012
14:00

Report

Turkey	68–73	Italy
Scoring by quarter: 19–16, 18–19, 12–24, 19–14
Pts: Ulubay 14; Rebs: Alemdaroğlu 9 Asts: five players 2		Pts: Donzelli 15; Rebs: Oliva 8 Asts: Oliva 4

Olympic Center Ventspils, Ventspils LAT
Attendance: 100
Referees: Marcin Kowalski (POL), Matej Spendl (SLO), Alin Faur (ROU)

21 July 2012
20:45

Report

Croatia	78–54	England
Scoring by quarter: 21–11, 17–18, 17–16, 23–9
Pts: Mazalin 21; Rebs: Božić, Mazalin 11; Asts: Tomic 4		Pts: Lautier-Ogunleye 13; Rebs: Muzikevicius 10; Asts: Dang 5

Olympic Center Ventspils, Ventspils LAT
Attendance: 100
Referees: Boris Schmidt (GER), Igor Mitrovski (MKD), Petr Hrusa (CZE)

==== Group B ====
Team	Pld	W	L	PF	PA	PD	Pts
Spain	3	3	0	226	196	+30	6
Ukraine	3	2	1	229	194	+35	5
Latvia	3	1	2	187	197	−10	4
Russia	3	0	3	186	241	−55	3

19 July 2012
18:45

Report

Latvia	63–65	Spain
Scoring by quarter: 16–19, 17–25, 14–10, 16–11
Pts: Avenitis 16; Rebs: Treimanis, Malmanis 7 Asts: Melderis 4		Pts: García 13; Rebs: Omeragic 9 Asts: Costa 3

Olympic Center Ventspils, Ventspils LAT
Attendance: 600
Referees: Milivoje Jovcic (SRB), Alin Faur (ROU), Igor Mitrovski (MKD)

19 July 2012
21:00

Report

Russia	63–87	Ukraine
Scoring by quarter: 17–27, 14–17, 17–20, 15–23
Pts: Zuyev 11; Rebs: Karpenkov 11; Asts: Shantaley 2		Pts: Kobets 19; Rebs: Balaban 10; Asts: Miroshnychenko 14

Olympic Center Ventspils, Ventspils LAT
Attendance: 100
Referees: David Chambon (FRA), Marcin Kowalski (POL), Christophe Daniel Bonbon (CAL)

20 July 2012
18:30

Report

Ukraine	73–58	Latvia
Scoring by quarter: 19–12, 17–20, 11–12, 26–14
Pts: Kobets 24; Rebs: Golyk 12; Asts: Podkovyrov 4		Pts: Meznieks-Zahars 17; Rebs: Melderis 10; Asts: Cima 4

Olympic Center Ventspils, Ventspils LAT
Attendance: 500
Referees: Marcin Kowalski (POL), Matej Spendl (SLO), Christophe Daniel Bonbon (CAL)

20 July 2012
20:45

Report

Spain	88–64	Russia
Scoring by quarter: 20–22, 24–14, 26–17, 18–11
Pts: M. García 25; Rebs: Omeragic 5 Asts: S.Garcia 4		Pts: Zuyev 15; Rebs: Maleyko 7 Asts: Aleksandr Gavrilov 8

Olympic Center Ventspils, Ventspils LAT
Attendance: 150
Referees: Boris Schmidt (GER), Martynas Gudas (LTU), Igor Mitrovski (MKD)

21 July 2012
16:15

Report

Spain	73–69	Ukraine
Scoring by quarter: 24–19, 11–14, 14–11, 24–25
Pts: M. García 20; Rebs: Martinez 8 Asts: Triginer 3		Pts: Mykhailiuk 16; Rebs: Kobets 9 Asts: Podkovyrov 3

Olympic Center Ventspils, Ventspils LAT
Attendance: 150
Referees: Milivoje Jovcic (SRB), David Chambon (FRA), Martynas Gudas (LTU)

21 July 2012
18:30

Report

Russia	59–66	Latvia
Scoring by quarter: 20–13, 10–14, 6–19, 23–20
Pts: Maleyko 18; Rebs: Karpenkov 10; Asts: four players 2		Pts: Avenitis 26; Rebs: Malmanis 9 Asts: Cima 3

Olympic Center Ventspils, Ventspils LAT
Attendance: 850
Referees: Ioannis Foufis (GRE), Gentian Cici (ALB), Christophe Daniel Bonbon (CAL)

==== Group C ====
Team	Pld	W	L	PF	PA	PD	Pts
Germany	3	3	0	202	175	+27	6
Serbia	3	2	1	201	195	+6	5
Lithuania	3	1	2	211	212	−1	4
Slovenia	3	0	3	190	222	−32	3

19 July 2012
15:00

Report

Germany	67–60	Serbia
Scoring by quarter: 19–4, 16–20, 18–20, 14–16
Pts: four players 11; Rebs: Wimberg 13; Asts: Schmitt 5		Pts: Pavlovic 14; Rebs: Lazarević 13; Asts: Starincevic 4

Cido Arena, Panevėžys LTU
Attendance: 120

19 July 2012
18:10

Report

Lithuania	82–76	Slovenia
Scoring by quarter: 23–14, 22–22, 13–8, 24–32
Pts: Sabonis 22; Rebs: Sabonis 9 Asts: Zupkauskas 10		Pts: Kavas, Kodrin 18; Rebs: Kodrin 7 Asts: Kovačević 4

Cido Arena, Panevėžys LTU
Attendance: 1,500
Referees: Luis Lopes (POR), Marius Ciulin (ROU), Vladyslav Isachenko (UKR)

20 July 2012
13:30

Report

Slovenia	50–69	Germany
Scoring by quarter: 14–24, 9–18, 16–11, 11–16
Pts: Sajevic 16; Rebs: Zupan, Medic 6 Asts: Sajevic 3		Pts: Wimberg 18; Rebs: Wimberg 11; Asts: Schmitt 5

Cido Arena, Panevėžys LTU
Attendance: 100
Referees: Arnis Ozols (LAT), Tsutomu Ozawa (JPN), Stephen Ellis (ENG)

20 July 2012
18:10

Report

Serbia	70–64	Lithuania
Scoring by quarter: 12–19, 22–15, 21–14, 15–16
Pts: Starincevic 28; Rebs: Lazarević 12; Asts: Starincevic 4		Pts: Zemgulis 11; Rebs: Sabonis 13; Asts: Zuklevicius, Zupkauskas 5

Cido Arena, Panevėžys LTU
Attendance: 1,300
Referees: Petar Obradovic (BIH), Aare Halliko (EST), Saverio Lanzarini (ITA)

21 July 2012
13:30

Report

Serbia	71–64	Slovenia
Scoring by quarter: 23–15, 16–19, 13–13, 19–17
Pts: Dokovic, Starincevic 13; Rebs: Daskalovic 12; Asts: three players 3		Pts: Kavas 20; Rebs: Zupan 10; Asts: Zupan 3

Cido Arena, Panevėžys LTU
Attendance: 100
Referees: Arnis Ozols (LAT), Saverio Lanzarini (ITA), Semen Ovinov (RUS)

21 July 2012
18:10

Report

Lithuania	65–66	Germany
Scoring by quarter: 21–8, 16–25, 13–18, 15–15
Pts: Paliukenas 24; Rebs: Sabonis 16; Asts: Zupkauskas 9		Pts: Wimberg 18; Rebs: Agva 9 Asts: Schmitt 5

Cido Arena, Panevėžys LTU
Attendance: 2,100
Referees: Juan Carlos Garcia Gonzalez (ESP), Luis Lopes (POR), Zafer Yilmaz (TUR)

==== Group D ====
Team	Pld	W	L	PF	PA	PD	Pts
France	3	3	0	195	137	+58	6
Greece	3	2	1	220	194	+26	5
Poland	3	1	2	197	217	−20	4
Czech Republic	3	0	3	171	235	−64	3

19 July 2012
12:45

Report

Poland	63–75	Greece
Scoring by quarter: 11–20, 17–23, 16–18, 19–14
Pts: Wlodarczyk, Zywert 15; Rebs: Kulka 11; Asts: Zywert 5		Pts: Charalampopoulos 17; Rebs: Charalampopoulos 8 Asts: three players 3

Cido Arena, Panevėžys LTU
Attendance: 50
Referees: Aare Halliko (EST), Stephen Ellis (ENG), Tsutomu Ozawa (JPN)

19 July 2012
20:30

Report

Czech Republic	33–60	France
Scoring by quarter: 10–15, 13–11, 7–21, 3–13
Pts: Svoboda 10; Rebs: Skranc 7 Asts: Hanzlík, Korínek 2		Pts: three players 10; Rebs: Gombauld 13; Asts: Michel 4

Cido Arena, Panevėžys LTU
Attendance: 100
Referees: Arnis Ozols (LAT), Petar Obradovic (BIH), Saverio Lanzarini (ITA)

20 July 2012
15:45

Report

France	65–45	Poland
Scoring by quarter: 14–14, 19–9, 17–15, 15–7
Pts: Wallez 18; Rebs: Fédensieu, Gombauld 7 Asts: Ory 7		Pts: Pruefer 12; Rebs: Pruefer 12; Asts: Zywert 3

Cido Arena, Panevėžys LTU
Attendance: 500
Referees: Luis Lopes (POR), Zafer Yilmaz (TUR), Vladyslav Isachenko (UKR)

20 July 2012
20:30

Report

Greece	86–61	Czech Republic
Scoring by quarter: 27–14, 12–21, 25–14, 22–12
Pts: Stamatis 23; Rebs: Tsiogkas, Mitoglou 7 Asts: Zorzos 4		Pts: Svoboda 22; Rebs: Svoboda 8 Asts: Hanzlík 4

Cido Arena, Panevėžys LTU
Attendance: 80
Referees: Juan Carlos Garcia Gonzalez (ESP), Marius Ciulin (ROU), Semen Ovinov (RUS)

21 July 2012
15:45

Report

Poland	89–77	Czech Republic
Scoring by quarter: 21–11, 21–21, 23–19, 24–26
Pts: Zywert 22; Rebs: three players 8 Asts: Zywert 6		Pts: Svoboda 21; Rebs: Skranc 10; Asts: Pulpán 4

Cido Arena, Panevėžys LTU
Attendance: 150
Referees: Aare Halliko (EST), Tsutomu Ozawa (JPN), Vladyslav Isachenko (UKR)

21 July 2012
20:30

Report

France	70–59	Greece
Scoring by quarter: 9–20, 27–12, 17–19, 17–8
Pts: Dussoulier 25; Rebs: three players 5 Asts: Michel 5		Pts: Stamatis 14; Rebs: Charalampopoulos 8 Asts: Stamatis 6

Cido Arena, Panevėžys LTU
Attendance: 100
Referees: Petar Obradovic (BIH), Marius Ciulin (ROU), Stephen Ellis (ENG)

=== Second round ===
The best twelve teams will be allocated in two groups of six teams each. The four top teams will advance to the quarterfinals. The last two teams of each group will play for the 9th–12th place.

Team advances to the quarterfinals
Team will compete in the 9th–12th-place playoffs

==== Group E ====
Team	Pld	W	L	PF	PA	PD	Pts
Italy	5	5	0	383	325	+58	10
Turkey	5	3	2	377	358	+19	8
Croatia	5	3	2	383	381	+2	8
Spain	5	2	3	323	356	−33	7
Ukraine	5	1	4	311	356	−45	6
Latvia	5	1	4	337	358	−21	6

23 July 2012
16:00

Report

Ukraine	57–72	Turkey
Scoring by quarter: 9–11, 10–12, 23–26, 15–23
Pts: Balaban 14; Rebs: Pryimak 6 Asts: Podkovyrov 5		Pts: Güven 15; Rebs: Ulubay 8 Asts: Geçim 6

Olympic Center Ventspils, Ventspils LAT
Attendance: 100
Referees: Ioannis Foufis (GRE), Boris Schmidt (GER), Christophe Daniel Bonbon (CAL)

23 July 2012
18:15

Report

Latvia	67–76	Italy
Scoring by quarter: 14–20, 21–16, 22–13, 10–27
Pts: Avenitis 28; Rebs: Malmanis 9 Asts: Cima 8		Pts: Oliva 23; Rebs: Oliva 16; Asts: Oliva 6

Olympic Center Ventspils, Ventspils LAT
Attendance: 750
Referees: David Chambon (FRA), Gentian Cici (ALB), Petr Hrusa (CZE)

23 July 2012
20:30

Report

Croatia	79–67	Spain
Scoring by quarter: 22–21, 19–17, 20–12, 18–17
Pts: Mazalin 23; Rebs: Božić 9 Asts: Arapovic 3		Pts: García 14; Rebs: Bauza, Omeragic 7 Asts: four players 2

Olympic Center Ventspils, Ventspils LAT
Attendance: 100
Referees: Milivoje Jovcic (SRB), Alin Faur (ROU), Matej Spendl (SLO)

24 July 2012
16:00

Report

Latvia	72–76	Croatia
Scoring by quarter: 20–23, 11–12, 15–15, 26–26
Pts: Meznieks-Zahars 20; Rebs: Cavars, Meznieks-Zahars 7 Asts: Cima 4		Pts: Mazalin 27; Rebs: Mazalin 10; Asts: Mazalin 5

Olympic Center Ventspils, Ventspils LAT
Attendance: 700
Referees: Boris Schmidt (GER), David Chambon (FRA), Christophe Daniel Bonbon (CAL)

24 July 2012
18:15

Report

Italy	83–65	Ukraine
Scoring by quarter: 19–12, 24–12, 20–18, 20–23
Pts: Mussini 22; Rebs: Mussini 4 Asts: Donzelli, Oliva 6		Pts: Pryimak 22; Rebs: Balaban, Pryimak 7 Asts: Podkovyrov 5

Olympic Center Ventspils, Ventspils LAT
Attendance: 100
Referees: Ioannis Foufis (GRE), Alin Faur (ROU), Matej Spendl (SLO)

24 July 2012
20:30

Report

Turkey	71–56	Spain
Scoring by quarter: 25–13, 13–21, 12–11, 21–11
Pts: Çevik, Oktay 14; Rebs: Alemdaroğlu 9 Asts: Geçim 4		Pts: García 13; Rebs: García, Oroz 6 Asts: Costa, Oroz 2

Olympic Center Ventspils, Ventspils LAT
Attendance: 150
Referees: Milivoje Jovcic (SRB), Gentian Cici (ALB), Petr Hrusa (CZE)

25 July 2012
16:00

Report

Ukraine	67–70	Croatia
Scoring by quarter: 18–18, 21–18, 15–23, 12–11
Pts: Balaban 22; Rebs: Pryimak 9 Asts: Ruslov 4		Pts: Božić 24; Rebs: Božić 18; Asts: Tomic 4

Olympic Center Ventspils, Ventspils LAT
Attendance: 100
Referees: Boris Schmidt (GER), Petr Hrusa (CZE), Gentian Cici (ALB)

25 July 2012
18:15

Report

Turkey	68–77	Latvia
Scoring by quarter: 10–29, 17–17, 22–20, 19–11
Pts: Ulubay 13; Rebs: Güven, Bayrak 5 Asts: Çevik, Geçim 3		Pts: Treimanis 17; Rebs: Malmanis 11; Asts: Feikners 7

Olympic Center Ventspils, Ventspils LAT
Attendance: 600
Referees: Ioannis Foufis (GRE), David Chambon (FRA), Christophe Daniel Bonbon (CAL)

25 July 2012
20:30

Report

Spain	62–74	Italy
Scoring by quarter: 13–15, 10–12, 12–25, 27–22
Pts: García 14; Rebs: Costa 5 Asts: three players 2		Pts: Donzelli, Flaccadori 17; Rebs: Oliva 9 Asts: Mussini 4

Olympic Center Ventspils, Ventspils LAT
Attendance: 100
Referees: Milivoje Jovcic (SRB), Alin Faur (ROU), Matej Spendl (SLO)

==== Group F ====
Team	Pld	W	L	PF	PA	PD	Pts	1st Tie
Serbia	5	4	1	318	299	+19	9	
France	5	3	2	294	265	+29	8	1–0
Germany	5	3	2	303	307	– 4	8	0–1
Poland	5	2	3	327	342	−15	7	1–0
Lithuania	5	2	3	329	320	+ 9	7	0–1
Greece	5	1	4	290	328	−38	6	

23 July 2012
15:45

Report

Greece	53–62	Serbia
Scoring by quarter: 16–16, 15–13, 4–12, 18–21
Pts: Stamatis 17; Rebs: Papagiannis 6 Asts: Toliopoulos 6		Pts: Starincevic 12; Rebs: Lazarević, Pavlovic 11; Asts: Starincevic 4

Cido Arena, Panevėžys LTU
Attendance: 250
Referees: Marius Ciulin (ROU), Arnis Ozols (LAT), Stephen Ellis (ENG)

23 July 2012
18:10

Report

Lithuania	56–51	France
Scoring by quarter: 11–11, 18–14, 15–8, 12–18
Pts: Paliukenas 14; Rebs: Sabonis 11; Asts: Zupkauskas 6		Pts: Wallez 21; Rebs: Wallez 6 Asts: Ory 5

Cido Arena, Panevėžys LTU
Attendance: 2,000
Referees: Petar Obradovic (BIH), Luis Lopes (POR), Saverio Lanzarini (ITA)

23 July 2012
20:30

Report

Poland	80–63	Germany
Scoring by quarter: 15–16, 30–14, 17–16, 18–17
Pts: M.Zywert 22; Rebs: Pruefer 10; Asts: K.Zywert 5		Pts: Wimberg 14; Rebs: Wimberg, Kiel 5 Asts: Schmitt 5

Cido Arena, Panevėžys LTU
Attendance: 100
Referees: Juan Carlos Garcia Gonzalez (ESP), Zafer Yilmaz (TUR), Semen Ovinov (RUS)

24 July 2012
20:30

Report

Germany	58–47	Greece
Scoring by quarter: 14–14, 9–9, 16–13, 19–11
Pts: Obst 20; Rebs: Kiel 17; Asts: Kiel 3		Pts: Stamatis 13; Rebs: Papagiannis 8 Asts: Oikonomopoulos 3

Cido Arena, Panevėžys LTU
Attendance: 100
Referees: Petar Obradovic (BIH), Arnis Ozols (LAT), Semen Ovinov (RUS)

24 July 2012
18:10

Report

Poland	77–69	Lithuania
Scoring by quarter: 16–13, 20–24, 20–18, 21–14
Pts: M.Zywert 23; Rebs: Kulka 7 Asts: K.Zywert 4		Pts: Krimelis 24; Rebs: Sabonis 27; Asts: Zuklevicius, Zupkauskas 5

Cido Arena, Panevėžys LTU
Attendance: 2,300
Referees: Marius Ciulin (ROU), Zafer Yilmaz (TUR), Saverio Lanzarini (ITA)

24 July 2012
15:45

Report

Serbia	56–53	France
Scoring by quarter: 11–14, 14–13, 14–7, 17–19
Pts: Pavlovic 15; Rebs: Lazarević 10; Asts: Dokovic 5		Pts: Ory 12; Rebs: Dussoulier 6 Asts: Ory 3

Cido Arena, Panevėžys LTU
Attendance: 200
Referees: Juan Carlos Garcia Gonzalez (ESP), Luis Lopes (POR), Stephen Ellis (ENG)

25 July 2012
15:45

Report

Serbia	70–62	Poland
Scoring by quarter: 12–16, 16–16, 19–15, 23–15
Pts: Pavlovic 15; Rebs: Vucetic 8 Asts: Jovanovic 4		Pts: Pruefer, Kulka 13; Rebs: Kulka 10; Asts: M/Zywert 5

Cido Arena, Panevėžys LTU
Attendance: 150
Referees: Petar Obradovic (BIH), Zafer Yilmaz (TUR), Stephen Ellis (ENG)

25 July 2012
18:10

Report

Greece	56–75	Lithuania
Scoring by quarter: 10–28, 13–13, 14–22, 19–12
Pts: Toliopoulos 14; Rebs: Stamatis 6 Asts: Stamatis 3		Pts: Krimelis 27; Rebs: Sabonis 12; Asts: Zupkauskas 7

Cido Arena, Panevėžys LTU
Attendance: 2,400
Referees: Juan Carlos Garcia Gonzalez (ESP), Arnis Ozols (LAT), Saverio Lanzarini (ITA)

25 July 2012
20:30

Report

France	55–49	Germany
Scoring by quarter: 22–13, 13–9, 0–17, 20–10
Pts: Charles-Catherine 14; Rebs: 3 players 4 Asts: Michel 5		Pts: Ferner 18; Rebs: Obst 5 Asts: 3 players 2

Cido Arena, Panevėžys LTU
Attendance: 200
Referees: Marius Ciulin (ROU), Luis Lopes (POR), Semyon Ovinov (RUS)

=== Classification round ===
The last teams of each group in the first round will compete in this classification round. The four teams played in one group. The last two teams will be relegated to Division B for the next season.

Team will be relegated to the 2015 Division B.

==== Group G ====
Team	Pld	W	L	PF	PA	PD	Pts
Russia	6	6	0	458	379	+79	12
Slovenia	6	3	3	413	451	−28	9
Czech Republic	6	2	4	422	438	−16	8
England	6	1	5	408	433	−25	7

23 July 2012
16:30

Report

England	86–77	Czech Republic
Scoring by quarter: 27–24, 18–12, 11–18, 30–23
Pts: Dang 16; Rebs: Oghide 10; Asts: Dang 7		Pts: Svoboda 23; Rebs: Svoboda 7 Asts: Hanzlík 4

Marciulonis Basketball Academy, Vilnius LTU
Attendance: 100
Referees: Marcin Kowalski (POL), Martynas Gudas (LTU), Vladyslav Isachenko (UKR)

23 July 2012
18:45

Report

Russia	71–63	Slovenia
Scoring by quarter: 26–12, 14–13, 21–14, 10–24
Pts: Getmanov 15; Rebs: Karpenkov 11; Asts: Aleksandr Gavrilov 5		Pts: ZUpan 16; Rebs: Kavas 9 Asts: Janc, Zupan 2

Marciulonis Basketball Academy, Vilnius LTU
Attendance: 60
Referees: Aare Halliko (EST), Tsutomu Ozawa (JPN), Igor Mitrovski (MKD)

24 July 2012
16:30

Slovenia	83–69	England

Marciulonis Basketball Academy, Vilnius LTU

24 July 2012
18:45

Czech Republic	66–76	Russia

Marciulonis Basketball Academy, Vilnius LTU

25 July 2012
16:30

England	57–68	Russia

Marciulonis Basketball Academy, Vilnius LTU

25 July 2012
18:45

Slovenia	66–79	Czech Republic

Marciulonis Basketball Academy, Vilnius LTU

27 July 2012
13:30

Czech Republic	67–63	England

Marciulonis Basketball Academy, Vilnius LTU

27 July 2012
15:45

Slovenia	57–102	Russia

Marciulonis Basketball Academy, Vilnius LTU

28 July 2012
13:30

Russia	69–67	Czech Republic

Marciulonis Basketball Academy, Vilnius LTU

28 July 2012
15:45

England	64–66	Slovenia

Marciulonis Basketball Academy, Vilnius LTU

29 July 2012
13:30

Russia	72–69	England

Marciulonis Basketball Academy, Vilnius LTU

29 July 2012
15:45

Czech Republic	66–78	Slovenia

Marciulonis Basketball Academy, Vilnius LTU

== Knockout round ==
=== Championship ===
Quarter-finals
July 27
Italy	82
Poland	79
July 27
France	67
Croatia	64
July 27
Serbia	68
Spain	67
July 27
Turkey	67
Germany	56

Semi-finals
July 28
Italy	71
France	80
July 28
Serbia	62
Turkey	67

Final
July 29
France	61
Turkey	66
Third place
July 29
Italy	69
Serbia	83

==== Quarterfinals ====
27 July 2012
13:30

Italy	82–79	Poland

Siemens Arena, Vilnius LTU

27 July 2012
15:45

Serbia	68–67	Spain

Siemens Arena, Vilnius LTU

27 July 2012
18:10

Turkey	67–56	Germany

Siemens Arena, Vilnius LTU

27 July 2012
20:30

France	67–64	Croatia

Siemens Arena, Vilnius LTU

==== Semifinals ====
28 July 2012
18:10

Italy	71–80	France

Siemens Arena, Vilnius LTU

28 July 2012
20:30

Serbia	62–67	Turkey

Siemens Arena, Vilnius LTU

==== Bronze medal game ====
29 July 2012
18:00

Italy	69–83	Serbia

Siemens Arena, Vilnius LTU

==== Final ====
29 July 2012
20:30

Report

France	61–66	Turkey
Scoring by quarter: 16–19, 17–18, 10–16, 18–13
Pts: Eliezer-Vanerot, Dussoulier 11; Rebs: Smock 8 Asts: Ory 6		Pts: Alemdaroğlu 14; Rebs: Alemdaroğlu 11; Asts: Geçim, Oktay 3

Siemens Arena, Vilnius LTU
Attendance: 400
Referees: Milivoje Jovcic (SRB), Marius Ciulin (ROU), Matej Spendl (SLO)

=== 5th–8th-place playoffs ===
Semi-finals
July 28
Poland	82
Croatia	76
July 28
Germany	88
Spain	64

Fifth place
July 29
Poland	59
Germany	74
Seventh place
July 29
Croatia	72
Spain	79

==== Classification 5–8 ====
28 July 2012
13:30

Poland	82–76	Croatia

Siemens Arena, Vilnius LTU

28 July 2012
15:45

Germany	88–64	Spain

Siemens Arena, Vilnius LTU

==== 7th-place game ====
29 July 2012
13:30

Croatia	72–79	Spain

Siemens Arena, Vilnius LTU

==== 5th-place game ====
29 July 2012
15:45

Poland	54–74	Germany

Siemens Arena, Vilnius LTU

=== 9th–12th-place playoffs ===
Semi-finals
July 27
Ukraine	64
Greece	80
July 27
Lithuania	72
Latvia	84

Ninth place
July 28
Greece	63
Latvia	46
Eleventh place
July 28
Ukraine	71
Lithuania	82

==== Classification 9–12 ====
27 July 2012
18:00

Ukraine	64–80	Greece

Marciulonis Basketball Academy, Vilnius LTU

27 July 2012
20:15

Lithuania	72–84	Latvia

Marciulonis Basketball Academy, Vilnius LTU

==== 11th-place game ====
28 July 2012
18:00

Ukraine	71–82	Lithuania

Marciulonis Basketball Academy, Vilnius LTU

==== 9th-place game ====
28 July 2012
20:15

Greece	63–46	Latvia

Marciulonis Basketball Academy, Vilnius LTU

== Final standings ==
Rank	Team
1st place, gold medalist(s)	Turkey
2nd place, silver medalist(s)	France
3rd place, bronze medalist(s)	Serbia
4th	Italy
5th	Germany
6th	Poland
7th	Spain
8th	Croatia
9th	Greece
10th	Latvia
11th	Lithuania
12th	Ukraine
13th	Russia
14th	Slovenia
15th	Czech Republic
16th	England

2012 FIBA Europe Under-16 Championship winner

Turkey
Third title

Relegated to the 2013 FIBA Europe Under-16 Championship Division B

== Awards ==
Most Valuable Player
(Turkey) Okben Ulubay

All-Tournament Team

- (Italy) Federico Mussini
- (France) Étienne Ory
- (Turkey) Okben Ulubay
- (Germany) Jan Wimberg
- (Croatia) Marko Arapović

== Broadcasting rights ==
- Lithuania – Lietuvos rytas TV
