= 2016 FIBA U20 European Championship =

19th edition of the FIBA U20 European Championship

Tournament details
- Host country: Finland
- Dates: 16–24 July
- Teams: 16
- Venue(s): 2 (in 1 host city)

Final positions
- Champions: Spain (2nd title)
- Runners-up: Lithuania
- Third place: Turkey
- Fourth place: Germany

Tournament statistics
- Games played: 56
- MVP: (Spain) Marc García
- Top scorer: (Finland) Lauri Markkanen (24.9 points per game)

Official website
- www.fiba.basketball

The 2016 FIBA U20 European Championship was the 19th edition of the FIBA U20 European Championship. The competition took place in Helsinki, Finland, from 16 to 24 July 2016.

== Participating teams ==
- Belgium
- Czech Republic
- Finland ▲ (Winners, 2015 FIBA Europe Under-20 Championship Division B)
- France
- Germany
- Hungary ▲ (3rd place, 2015 FIBA Europe Under-20 Championship Division B)
- Israel
- Italy
- Latvia
- Lithuania
- Serbia
- Slovenia
- Spain
- Sweden ▲ (Runners-up, 2015 FIBA Europe Under-20 Championship Division B)
- Turkey
- Ukraine

== First round ==
In this round, the 16 teams are allocated in four groups of four teams each. All teams will advance to the Second Round of 16.

=== Group A ===
| Pos | Team | Pld | W | L | PF | PA | PD | Pts |
|---|---|---|---|---|---|---|---|---|
| 1 | Turkey | 3 | 3 | 0 | 238 | 195 | +43 | 6 |
| 2 | Germany | 3 | 2 | 1 | 233 | 188 | +45 | 5 |
| 3 | Lithuania | 3 | 1 | 2 | 273 | 237 | +36 | 4 |
| 4 | Hungary | 3 | 0 | 3 | 177 | 301 | −124 | 3 |

Source: FIBA
Rules for classification: 1) Points; 2) Head-to-head results; 3) Points difference; 4) Points scored.

16 July 2016
16:15

Boxscore

| Turkey | 90–68 | Lithuania |
Scoring by quarter: 23–17, 21–16, 23–18, 23–17
| Pts: Arar, Güven 13; Rebs: Arslan 7 Asts: three players 4 | | Pts: Varnas, Miniotas 10; Rebs: Miniotas 8 Asts: Paliukenas 5 |

Pasilan urheiluhalli, Helsinki

16 July 2016
18:30

Boxscore

| Hungary | 44–92 | Germany |
Scoring by quarter: 6–25, 8–20, 13–23, 17–24
| Pts: Krivacevic 10; Rebs: Krivacevic 6 Asts: Horvath 3 | | Pts: Wimberg 20; Rebs: Kratzer 12; Asts: Grof 5 |

Pasilan urheiluhalli, Helsinki

17 July 2016
14:00

Boxscore

| Germany | 63–67 | Turkey |
Scoring by quarter: 11–22, 28–12, 13–10, 11–23
| Pts: Obst 17; Rebs: Wimberg 11; Asts: Beyschlag 5 | | Pts: Arslan 15; Rebs: three players 5 Asts: Geçim 5 |

Helsinki Ice Stadium, Helsinki

17 July 2016
20:45

Boxscore

| Lithuania | 128–69 | Hungary |
Scoring by quarter: 32–14, 28–19, 41–17, 27–19
| Pts: Birutis 18; Rebs: Miniotas 10; Asts: Žemaitis 9 | | Pts: Mocsan 32; Rebs: Demeter 3 Asts: four players 2 |

Helsinki Ice Stadium, Helsinki

19 July 2016
14:00

Boxscore

| Germany | 78–77 | Lithuania |
Scoring by quarter: 21–19, 10–24, 26–21, 21–13
| Pts: Mushidi 26; Rebs: Agva 6 Asts: Beyschlag 4 | | Pts: Sajus 17; Rebs: Echodas, Miniotas 8 Asts: Žemaitis 5 |

Pasilan urheiluhalli, Helsinki

19 July 2016
16:15

Boxscore

| Turkey | 81–64 | Hungary |
Scoring by quarter: 15–12, 22–18, 21–18, 23–16
| Pts: Çevik, Yurtseven 11; Rebs: Güven 7 Asts: Baykan 5 | | Pts: Mocsan, Antoni 11; Rebs: Pongo 6 Asts: Pongo 4 |

Pasilan urheiluhalli, Helsinki

=== Group B ===
| Pos | Team | Pld | W | L | PF | PA | PD | Pts |
|---|---|---|---|---|---|---|---|---|
| 1 | Spain | 3 | 2 | 1 | 240 | 221 | +19 | 5 |
| 2 | Finland | 3 | 2 | 1 | 233 | 236 | −3 | 5 |
| 3 | Israel | 3 | 2 | 1 | 238 | 228 | +10 | 5 |
| 4 | France | 3 | 0 | 3 | 190 | 216 | −26 | 3 |

Source: FIBA
Rules for classification: 1) Points; 2) Head-to-head results; 3) Points difference; 4) Points scored.

16 July 2016
18:30

Boxscore

| Israel | 81–72 | Finland |
Scoring by quarter: 14–14, 21–19, 22–23, 24–16
| Pts: Blatt 25; Rebs: Flaisher 7 Asts: Blatt 8 | | Pts: Markkanen 18; Rebs: three players 8 Asts: Hirvonen 7 |

Helsinki Ice Stadium, Helsinki

16 July 2016
20:45

Boxscore

| Spain | 60–59 | France |
Scoring by quarter: 11–12, 13–15, 19–19, 17–13
| Pts: M.García 14; Rebs: Vilà 8 Asts: Yusta 4 | | Pts: Noua 14; Rebs: Noua 10; Asts: Michel 3 |

Helsinki Ice Stadium, Helsinki

17 July 2016
16:15

Boxscore

| France | 66–86 | Israel |
Scoring by quarter: 16–18, 16–26, 14–24, 20–18
| Pts: Okobo 22; Rebs: Cavaliere 6 Asts: three players 3 | | Pts: Koperberg 21; Rebs: Koperberg 8 Asts: Blatt 7 |

Helsinki Ice Stadium, Helsinki

17 July 2016
18:30

Boxscore

| Finland | 91–90 (OT) | Spain |
Scoring by quarter: 23–24, 22–21, 19–14, 20–25, Overtime: 7–6
| Pts: Markkanen 33; Rebs: Murphy, Tahvanainen 8 Asts: Hirvonen 13 | | Pts: M.García 23; Rebs: M.García 10; Asts: Alonso 5 |

Helsinki Ice Stadium, Helsinki

19 July 2016
18:30

Boxscore

| Finland | 70–65 | France |
Scoring by quarter: 8–15, 19–16, 24–15, 19–19
| Pts: Markkanen 27; Rebs: Markkanen 12; Asts: Hirvonen 5 | | Pts: Okobo 18; Rebs: Eliezer-Vanerot 6 Asts: Eliezer-Vanerot 5 |

Helsinki Ice Stadium, Helsinki

19 July 2016
20:45

Boxscore

| Spain | 90–71 | Israel |
Scoring by quarter: 21–22, 24–9, 30–23, 15–17
| Pts: M.García 17; Rebs: Sima, Martí 8 Asts: Alonso 8 | | Pts: Danino 14; Rebs: Ben Moshe, Danino 6 Asts: Blatt 6 |

Helsinki Ice Stadium, Helsinki

=== Group C ===
| Pos | Team | Pld | W | L | PF | PA | PD | Pts |
|---|---|---|---|---|---|---|---|---|
| 1 | Ukraine | 3 | 2 | 1 | 230 | 209 | +21 | 5 |
| 2 | Serbia | 3 | 2 | 1 | 212 | 226 | −14 | 5 |
| 3 | Latvia | 3 | 1 | 2 | 216 | 213 | +3 | 4 |
| 4 | Slovenia | 3 | 1 | 2 | 209 | 219 | −10 | 4 |

Source: FIBA
Rules for classification: 1) Points; 2) Head-to-head results; 3) Points difference; 4) Points scored.

16 July 2016
14:00

Boxscore

| Serbia | 70–68 | Latvia |
Scoring by quarter: 21–15, 15–14, 17–21, 17–18
| Pts: Lazarević 18; Rebs: Ostojić 7 Asts: Đoković 7 | | Pts: Lomažs 29; Rebs: Gutmanis 9 Asts: Lomažs 4 |

Pasilan urheiluhalli, Helsinki

16 July 2016
20:45

Boxscore

| Slovenia | 70–68 | Ukraine |
Scoring by quarter: 7–19, 19–17, 23–11, 21–21
| Pts: Ožegovič 16; Rebs: three players 7 Asts: Šiško 6 | | Pts: Kobets 21; Rebs: Mykhailiuk, Pavlov 11; Asts: Miroshnychenko 3 |

Pasilan urheiluhalli, Helsinki

17 July 2016
16:15

Boxscore

| Ukraine | 90–69 | Serbia |
Scoring by quarter: 25–14, 21–20, 23–14, 21–21
| Pts: Kobets 20; Rebs: Tarasenko 6 Asts: Zotov 5 | | Pts: Jovanović 13; Rebs: Ostojić, Marinković 4 Asts: Ostojić 4 |

Pasilan urheiluhalli, Helsinki

17 July 2016
20:45

Boxscore

| Latvia | 78–71 | Slovenia |
Scoring by quarter: 9–14, 22–15, 19–27, 28–15
| Pts: Kohs 18; Rebs: Čavars 12; Asts: Birkans 7 | | Pts: Martinčič 21; Rebs: Durnik, Čančar 5 Asts: Sisko 10 |

Pasilan urheiluhalli, Helsinki

19 July 2016
14:00

Boxscore

| Ukraine | 72–70 (OT) | Latvia |
Scoring by quarter: 10–17, 12–15, 21–23, 22–10, Overtime: 7–5
| Pts: Mykhailiuk, Pavlov 17; Rebs: Sydorov 7 Asts: Sydorov 6 | | Pts: Čavars 18; Rebs: Čavars 14; Asts: Birkans 4 |

Helsinki Ice Stadium, Helsinki

19 July 2016
16:15

Boxscore

| Serbia | 73–68 | Slovenia |
Scoring by quarter: 18–15, 9–19, 26–21, 20–13
| Pts: Marinković 19; Rebs: Vučetić, Peno 9 Asts: Ostojić, Vučetić 3 | | Pts: Zupan 14; Rebs: Čančar 10; Asts: Šiško 5 |

Helsinki Ice Stadium, Helsinki

=== Group D ===
| Pos | Team | Pld | W | L | PF | PA | PD | Pts |
|---|---|---|---|---|---|---|---|---|
| 1 | Czech Republic | 3 | 2 | 1 | 232 | 217 | +15 | 5 |
| 2 | Sweden | 3 | 2 | 1 | 190 | 185 | +5 | 5 |
| 3 | Italy | 3 | 1 | 2 | 225 | 215 | +10 | 4 |
| 4 | Belgium | 3 | 1 | 2 | 202 | 232 | −30 | 4 |

Source: FIBA
Rules for classification: 1) Points; 2) Head-to-head results; 3) Points difference; 4) Points scored.

16 July 2016
13:45

Boxscore

| Italy | 71–82 | Czech Republic |
Scoring by quarter: 20–19, 10–14, 17–25, 24–24
| Pts: Flaccadori, Mussini 16; Rebs: Flaccadori 7 Asts: Flaccadori, Moretti 4 | | Pts: Svoboda 28; Rebs: Pursl 7 Asts: Pulpan 5 |

Helsinki Ice Stadium, Helsinki

16 July 2016
16:00

Boxscore

| Sweden | 60–53 | Belgium |
Scoring by quarter: 14–14, 17–16, 10–7, 19–17
| Pts: Drammeh 21; Rebs: Andersson 12; Asts: Drammeh 5 | | Pts: Lambrecht 20; Rebs: Lambrecht 9 Asts: Kanya-Kanyinda 4 |

Helsinki Ice Stadium, Helsinki

17 July 2016
14:00

Boxscore

| Belgium | 64–89 | Italy |
Scoring by quarter: 12–19, 16–22, 18–22, 18–26
| Pts: Casero Ortiz 13; Rebs: Kohajda 7 Asts: Demirtaş 2 | | Pts: Flaccadori 16; Rebs: Severini, Donzelli 5 Asts: Flaccadori 6 |

Pasilan urheiluhalli, Helsinki

17 July 2016
18:30

Boxscore

| Czech Republic | 67–61 | Sweden |
Scoring by quarter: 7–22, 16–11, 21–8, 23–20
| Pts: Svoboda 22; Rebs: Svoboda 11; Asts: Pulpan 8 | | Pts: Drammeh 25; Rebs: Andersson 10; Asts: Brandmark 3 |

Pasilan urheiluhalli, Helsinki

19 July 2016
18:30

Boxscore

| Italy | 65–69 | Sweden |
Scoring by quarter: 18–12, 17–16, 17–20, 13–21
| Pts: Flaccadori, Mussini 13; Rebs: Donzelli 8 Asts: Donzelli 4 | | Pts: Drammeh 16; Rebs: Andersson, Birgander 11; Asts: Brandmark 4 |

Pasilan urheiluhalli, Helsinki

19 July 2016
20:45

Boxscore

| Belgium | 85–83 | Czech Republic |
Scoring by quarter: 14–23, 27–16, 24–25, 20–19
| Pts: Lambrecht 20; Rebs: Lambrecht 8 Asts: Demirtaş 5 | | Pts: Svoboda 22; Rebs: Jokl 11; Asts: Svoboda 4 |

Pasilan urheiluhalli, Helsinki

== Final round ==
Round of 16
20 July
Turkey | 82
France | 75
20 July
Serbia | 65
Italy | 70
20 July
Finland | 62
Lithuania | 81
20 July
Czech Republic | 79
Slovenia | 77
20 July
Germany | 89
Israel | 73
20 July
Ukraine | 95
Belgium | 73
20 July
Spain | 87
Hungary | 66
20 July
Sweden | 53
Latvia | 66

Quarterfinals
22 July
Turkey | 83
Italy | 72
22 July
Lithuania | 79
Czech Republic | 69
22 July
Germany | 64
Ukraine | 52
22 July
Spain | 79
Latvia | 70

Semifinals
23 July
Turkey | 64
Lithuania | 68
23 July
Germany | 52
Spain | 61

Final
24 July
Lithuania | 55
Spain | 68
Third place
24 July
Turkey | 76
Germany | 61

=== Round of 16 ===
20 July 2016
14:00

Boxscore

| Turkey | 82–75 | France |
Scoring by quarter: 22–21, 17–18, 22–16, 21–20
| Pts: Yurtseven 19; Rebs: Yurtseven 9 Asts: Uğurlu 8 | | Pts: Okobo 23; Rebs: Michel 7 Asts: Michel 5 |

Helsinki Ice Stadium, Helsinki

20 July 2016
14:00

Boxscore

| Sweden | 53–66 | Latvia |
Scoring by quarter: 9–17, 10–18, 15–16, 19–15
| Pts: Drammeh 15; Rebs: Drammeh 7 Asts: Sjolin, Svanstrom 2 | | Pts: Lomažs 17; Rebs: Hazners 9 Asts: Birkans 3 |

Pasilan urheiluhalli, Helsinki

20 July 2016
16:15

Boxscore

| Spain | 87–66 | Hungary |
Scoring by quarter: 30–10, 17–16, 20–21, 20–19
| Pts: Yusta 13; Rebs: Yusta 6 Asts: Yusta, S.García 5 | | Pts: Mocsan 17; Rebs: Peringer 5 Asts: Pongo 7 |

Helsinki Ice Stadium, Helsinki

20 July 2016
16:15

Boxscore

| Czech Republic | 79–77 (OT) | Slovenia |
Scoring by quarter: 23–15, 11–18, 16–12, 16–21, Overtime: 13–11
| Pts: Svoboda 26; Rebs: Svoboda 10; Asts: Pulpan 6 | | Pts: Grubelič 18; Rebs: Čančar, Zupan 8 Asts: Čančar, Šiško 7 |

Pasilan urheiluhalli, Helsinki

20 July 2016
18:30

Boxscore

| Finland | 62–81 | Lithuania |
Scoring by quarter: 15–16, 11–26, 14–25, 22–14
| Pts: Markkanen 22; Rebs: Markkanen 8 Asts: Nikkarinen5 | | Pts: Paliukenas 20; Rebs: Miniotas 10; Asts: Žemaitis 7 |

Helsinki Ice Stadium, Helsinki

20 July 2016
18:30

Boxscore

| Serbia | 65–70 | Italy |
Scoring by quarter: 17–14, 19–16, 17–13, 12–27
| Pts: Vučetić 16; Rebs: Lazarević 12; Asts: Peno 4 | | Pts: Flaccadori 18; Rebs: Donzelli 8 Asts: Flaccadori 5 |

Pasilan urheiluhalli, Helsinki

20 July 2016
20:45

Boxscore

| Germany | 89–73 | Israel |
Scoring by quarter: 10–21, 33–17, 27–22, 19–13
| Pts: Wimberg 18; Rebs: Agva 11; Asts: Beyschlag 5 | | Pts: Blatt 15; Rebs: Koperberg 8 Asts: Blatt 7 |

Helsinki Ice Stadium, Helsinki

20 July 2016
20:45

Boxscore

| Ukraine | 95–73 | Belgium |
Scoring by quarter: 24–27, 24–17, 28–9, 19–18
| Pts: Pavlov 18; Rebs: Mykhailiuk 8 Asts: Sydorov 6 | | Pts: Akyazili 13; Rebs: Kohajda 10; Asts: Akyazili 4 |

Pasilan urheiluhalli, Helsinki

=== 9th–16th place classification ===
9th–16th place quarterfinals
22 July
France | 65
Serbia | 88
22 July
Finland | 47
Slovenia | 81
22 July
Israel | 93
Belgium | 89
22 July
Hungary | 43
Sweden | 62

9th–12th place semifinals
23 July
Serbia | 77
Slovenia | 89
23 July
Israel | 69
Sweden | 83

Ninth place
24 July
Slovenia | 82
Sweden | 77
Eleventh place
24 July
Serbia | 88
Israel | 60

13th–16th place semifinals
23 July
France | 74
Finland | 60
23 July
Belgium | 89
Hungary | 83

13th place
24 July
France | 79
Belgium | 70
15th place
24 July
Finland | 91
Hungary | 70

==== 9th–16th place quarterfinals ====
22 July 2016
14:00

Boxscore

| France | 65–88 | Serbia |
Scoring by quarter: 29–20, 11–23, 10–19, 15–26
| Pts: Noua 19; Rebs: Cavaliere 8 Asts: Francisco 8 | | Pts: Ostojić 14; Rebs: Lazarević 8 Asts: R.Đoković 6 |

Pasilan urheiluhalli, Helsinki

22 July 2016
16:15

Boxscore

| Finland | 47–81 | Slovenia |
Scoring by quarter: 11–23, 9–21, 17–17, 10–20
| Pts: Markkanen 20; Rebs: Markkanen 8 Asts: Nikkarinen 5 | | Pts: Čančar 18; Rebs: Zupan, Čančar 11; Asts: Šiško 7 |

Pasilan urheiluhalli, Helsinki

22 July 2016
18:30

Boxscore

| Israel | 93–89 | Belgium |
Scoring by quarter: 19–11, 11–21, 23–26, 32–31
| Pts: Koperberg 28; Rebs: Koperberg 7 Asts: Blatt 10 | | Pts: Akyazili 23; Rebs: Lambrecht 10; Asts: Casero Ortiz 4 |

Pasilan urheiluhalli, Helsinki

22 July 2016
20:45

Boxscore

| Hungary | 43–62 | Sweden |
Scoring by quarter: 12–22, 9–17, 12–17, 10–6
| Pts: Mocsan 23; Rebs: Pongo 8 Asts: Pongo 2 | | Pts: Johansson 12; Rebs: Andersson 10; Asts: Drammeh 8 |

Pasilan urheiluhalli, Helsinki

==== 13th–16th place semifinals ====
23 July 2016
14:00

Boxscore

| France | 74–60 | Finland |
Scoring by quarter: 19–15, 11–18, 21–9, 23–18
| Pts: Okobo 23; Rebs: Noua 15; Asts: Francisco 5 | | Pts: Markkanen 28; Rebs: Markkanen 7 Asts: Hirvonen 7 |

Helsinki Ice Stadium, Helsinki

23 July 2016
16:15

Boxscore

| Belgium | 89–83 | Hungary |
Scoring by quarter: 20–14, 22–18, 18–19, 29–22
| Pts: Foerts 27; Rebs: Lambrecht 16; Asts: Akyazili 4 | | Pts: Pongo 32; Rebs: Pongo 10; Asts: Pongo 5 |

Helsinki Ice Stadium, Helsinki

==== 15th place game ====
24 July 2016
16:15

Boxscore

| Finland | 91–70 | Hungary |
Scoring by quarter: 31–15, 19–17, 24–19, 17–19
| Pts: Markkanen 26; Rebs: Markkanen 10; Asts: Hirvonen 6 | | Pts: Andrassy 11; Rebs: Pongo 6 Asts: Pongo 6 |

Helsinki Ice Stadium, Helsinki

==== 13th place game ====
24 July 2016
14:00

Boxscore

| France | 79–70 | Belgium |
Scoring by quarter: 27–17, 12–23, 22–19, 18–11
| Pts: Eliezer-Vanerot 22; Rebs: Noua 11; Asts: Michel 11 | | Pts: Kanya-Kanyinda 20; Rebs: Lambrecht 11; Asts: Kanya-Kanyinda, Akyazili 4 |

Helsinki Ice Stadium, Helsinki

==== 9th–12th place semifinals ====
23 July 2016
18:30

Boxscore

| Serbia | 77–89 (OT) | Slovenia |
Scoring by quarter: 22–18, 20–17, 16–24, 15–15, Overtime: 4–16
| Pts: Lazarević 20; Rebs: Lazarević 13; Asts: Peno 4 | | Pts: Čančar 24; Rebs: Zupan 7 Asts: Šiško 7 |

Pasilan urheiluhalli, Helsinki

23 July 2016
20:45

Boxscore

| Israel | 69–83 | Sweden |
Scoring by quarter: 12–19, 12–26, 18–23, 27–15
| Pts: Koperberg 18; Rebs: Koperberg 9 Asts: Blatt 6 | | Pts: Johansson 23; Rebs: Brandmark 9 Asts: Brandmark 10 |

Pasilan urheiluhalli, Helsinki

==== Eleventh place game ====
24 July 2016
16:15

Boxscore

| Serbia | 88–60 | Israel |
Scoring by quarter: 16–14, 28–11, 17–13, 27–22
| Pts: three players 14; Rebs: Lazarević 9 Asts: Peno 5 | | Pts: Leumi 20; Rebs: Artzi 7 Asts: Leumi, Huber 3 |

Pasilan urheiluhalli, Helsinki

==== Ninth place game ====
24 July 2016
18:30

Boxscore

| Slovenia | 82–77 | Sweden |
Scoring by quarter: 16–14, 22–19, 16–20, 28–24
| Pts: Grubelic 17; Rebs: Zupan 11; Asts: Šiško 8 | | Pts: Kobylak 21; Rebs: Birgander 6 Asts: Svensson 5 |

Pasilan urheiluhalli, Helsinki

=== Quarterfinals ===
22 July 2016
14:00

Boxscore

| Turkey | 83–72 | Italy |
Scoring by quarter: 26–9, 18–18, 24–13, 15–32
| Pts: Arar 24; Rebs: Yurtseven 12; Asts: Geçim 7 | | Pts: Flaccadori 17; Rebs: four players 4 Asts: Candi 3 |

Helsinki Ice Stadium, Helsinki

22 July 2016
16:15

Boxscore

| Lithuania | 79–69 | Czech Republic |
Scoring by quarter: 12–12, 20–17, 23–19, 24–21
| Pts: three players 12; Rebs: Miniotas 14; Asts: Miniotas 5 | | Pts: Pulpan 13; Rebs: Svoboda, Pursl 5 Asts: Pulpan 7 |

Helsinki Ice Stadium, Helsinki

22 July 2016
18:30

Boxscore

| Germany | 64–52 | Ukraine |
Scoring by quarter: 10–12, 12–16, 18–12, 24–12
| Pts: Obst 28; Rebs: Wimberg, Grof 8 Asts: Grof 3 | | Pts: Mykhailiuk 12; Rebs: Tarasenko 8 Asts: Sydorov 7 |

Helsinki Ice Stadium, Helsinki

22 July 2016
20:45

Boxscore

| Spain | 79–70 | Latvia |
Scoring by quarter: 25–19, 21–20, 22–17, 11–14
| Pts: Alonso 26; Rebs: Yusta 7 Asts: S.García 6 | | Pts: Lomažs 31; Rebs: Čavars 10; Asts: Birkans 7 |

Helsinki Ice Stadium, Helsinki

=== 5th–8th place classification ===
5–8th place semifinals
23 July
Italy | 81
Czech Republic | 66
23 July
Ukraine | 62
Latvia | 84

Fifth place
24 July
Italy | 86
Latvia | 79
Seventh place
24 July
Czech Republic | 105
Ukraine | 103

==== 5th–8th place semifinals ====
23 July 2016
14:00

Boxscore

| Italy | 81–66 | Czech Republic |
Scoring by quarter: 20–17, 13–11, 25–16, 23–22
| Pts: Flaccadori 17; Rebs: La Torre, Mussini 6 Asts: Flaccadori 4 | | Pts: Pursl 15; Rebs: Svoboda, Pursl 8 Asts: Pulpan 4 |

Pasilan urheiluhalli, Helsinki

23 July 2016
16:15

Boxscore

| Ukraine | 62–84 | Latvia |
Scoring by quarter: 13–23, 19–19, 15–30, 15–12
| Pts: Mykhailiuk 20; Rebs: Balaban 9 Asts: Sydorov 7 | | Pts: Gutmanis 20; Rebs: Hazners 6 Asts: Feikners 5 |

Pasilan urheiluhalli, Helsinki

==== Seventh place game ====
24 July 2016
11:45

Boxscore

| Czech Republic | 105–103 | Ukraine |
Scoring by quarter: 26–26, 32–24, 29–26, 18–27
| Pts: Pursl 29; Rebs: Svoboda 10; Asts: Pulpan 12 | | Pts: Mykhailiuk 21; Rebs: Tasarenko 9 Asts: Zotov 11 |

Pasilan urheiluhalli, Helsinki

==== Fifth place game ====
24 July 2016
14:00

Boxscore

| Italy | 86–79 | Latvia |
Scoring by quarter: 25–22, 18–20, 29–13, 14–24
| Pts: Flaccadori 18; Rebs: Flaccadori 7 Asts: Flaccadori 7 | | Pts: Gutmanis 17; Rebs: Čavars 7 Asts: Grinbergs 4 |

Pasilan urheiluhalli, Helsinki

=== Semifinals ===
23 July 2016
18:30

Boxscore

| Germany | 52–61 | Spain |
Scoring by quarter: 18–15, 11–13, 13–11, 10–22
| Pts: Obst 11; Rebs: four players 7 Asts: Wimberg 4 | | Pts: Alonso 22; Rebs: Vilà 7 Asts: three players 2 |

Helsinki Ice Stadium, Helsinki

23 July 2016
20:45

Boxscore

| Turkey | 64–68 | Lithuania |
Scoring by quarter: 24–16, 9–14, 18–17, 13–21
| Pts: Geçim 23; Rebs: Geçim, Arar 7 Asts: Arslan 5 | | Pts: Sajus, Fiodorovas 17; Rebs: Sajus 12; Asts: Žemaitis 5 |

Helsinki Ice Stadium, Helsinki

=== Third place game ===
24 July 2016
18:30

Boxscore

| Turkey | 76–61 | Germany |
Scoring by quarter: 17–19, 17–17, 13–13, 29–12
| Pts: Uğurlu 17; Rebs: Arar 6 Asts: Uğurlu 8 | | Pts: Obst 11; Rebs: Agva 8 Asts: Obst 4 |

Helsinki Ice Stadium, Helsinki

=== Final ===
24 July 2016
21:00

Boxscore

| Lithuania | 55–68 | Spain |
Scoring by quarter: 17–17, 15–23, 14–12, 9–16
| Pts: Fiodorovas 13; Rebs: Miniotas 10; Asts: Paliukenas, Normantas 3 | | Pts: M.García 21; Rebs: Vilà 14; Asts: Alonso 5 |

Helsinki Ice Stadium, Helsinki
Attendance: 2 500
Referees: Oļegs Latiševs (LAT), Zafer Yilmaz (TUR), Anne Panther (GER)

== Final standings ==
| Team relegated to 2017 European U-20 Division B |

| Rank | Team | Record |
|---|---|---|
| Gold medal | Spain | 6–1 |
| Silver medal | Lithuania | 4–3 |
| Bronze medal | Turkey | 6–1 |
| 4th | Germany | 4–3 |
| 5th | Italy | 4–3 |
| 6th | Latvia | 3–4 |
| 7th | Czech Republic | 4–3 |
| 8th | Ukraine | 3–4 |
| 9th | Slovenia | 4–3 |
| 10th | Sweden | 4–3 |
| 11th | Serbia | 4–3 |
| 12th | Israel | 3–4 |
| 13th | France | 2–5 |
| 14th | Belgium | 2–5 |
| 15th | Finland | 3–4 |
| 16th | Hungary | 0–7 |

== Awards ==
Most Valuable Player
(Spain) Marc García

=== All-Tournament Team ===
- (Spain) Francis Alonso
- (Lithuania) Kristupas Žemaitis
- (Finland) Lauri Markkanen
- (Turkey) Ömer Yurtseven
