= Tim Lambrecht =

Belgian basketball player (born 1998)

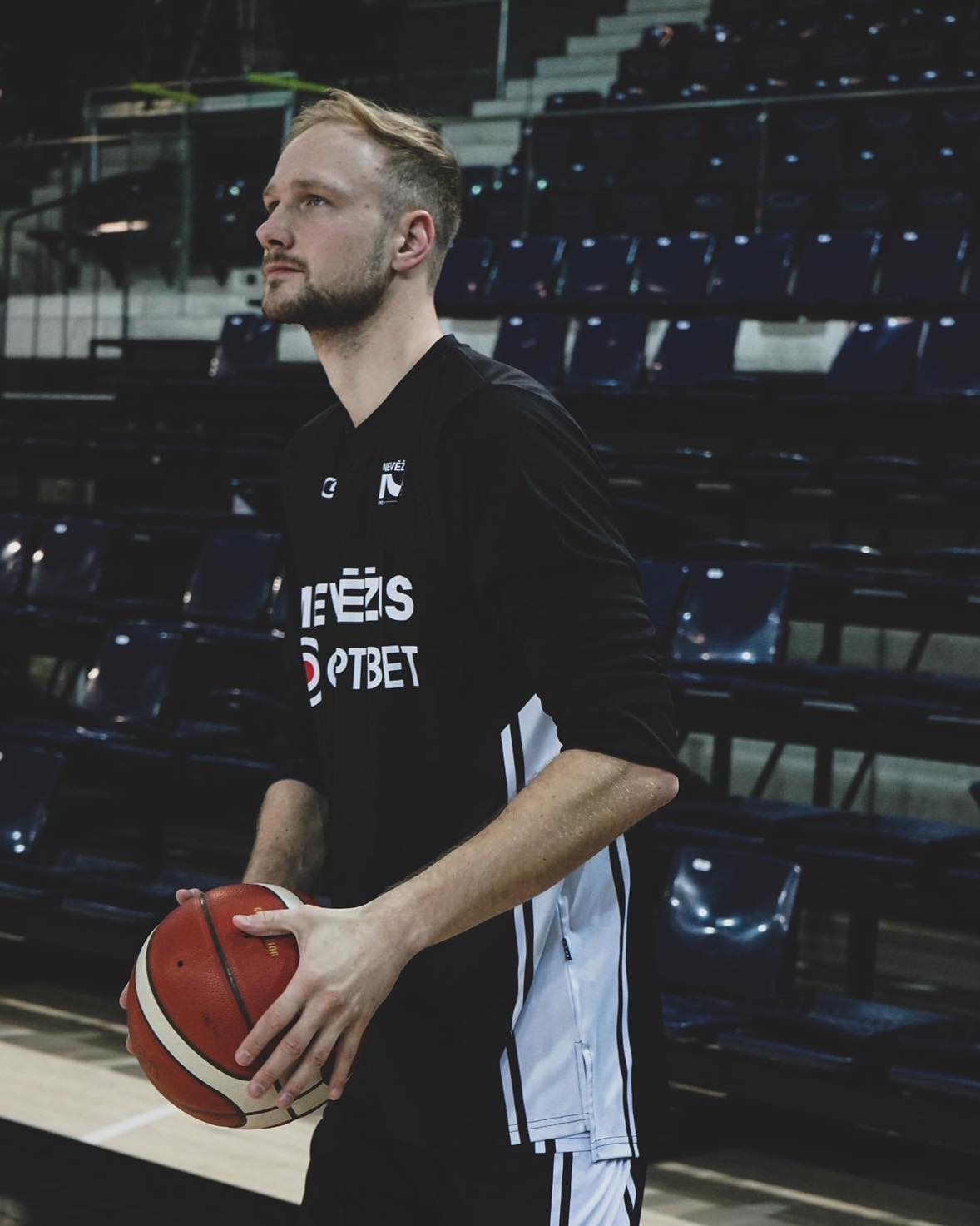
- Lambrecht with Nevėžis in 2022

No. 8 – Jonava Hipocredit
- Position: Power forward / Center
- League: LKL

Personal information
- Born: 15 January 1998 (age 28) Leuven, Belgium
- Listed height: 2.07 m (6 ft 9 in)
- Listed weight: 103 kg (227 lb)

Career information
- NBA draft: 2020: undrafted
- Playing career: 2015–present

Career history
- 2015–2020: Oostende
- 2019–2020: → Leuven Bears
- 2020–2022: Spirou Charleroi
- 2022–2023: Nevėžis Kėdainiai
- 2023–2024: Neptūnas Klaipėda
- 2024–2025: Stal Ostrów Wielkopolski
- 2025: Iraklis Thessaloniki
- 2025–2026: Czarni Słupsk
- 2026–present: Jonava Hipocredit

Career highlights
- 4× Belgian League champion (2016–2019); 3× Belgian Cup champion (2016–2018)

Tim Lambrecht (born 15 January 1998) is a Belgian professional basketball player for Jonava Hipocredit of the Lithuanian Basketball League (LKL). Standing at 2.07 m (6 ft 9 1/2 in), he plays as power forward and center.

== Career ==
In August 2015, Lambrecht became a member of the senior team of Telenet Oostende. With Oostende, he won four straight Pro Basketball League titles, from 2016 until 2019.

Lambrecht was sent on loan to Leuven Bears for the 2019–20 season.

On 25 July 2022, Lambrecht signed with Nevėžis Kėdainiai of the Lithuanian Basketball League. On 7 July 2023, he signed a one-year contract with Neptūnas Klaipėda.

On 14 August 2024, Lambrecht signed with Stal Ostrów Wielkopolski of the Polish Basketball League. On 15 September 2025, Lambrecht signed a one-year contract with Iraklis Thessaloniki of the Greek Basketball League.

On November 4, 2025, he signed with Czarni Słupsk of the Polish Basketball League (PLK).

On August 3, 2026, Lambrecht signed one–year contract with Jonava Hipocredit of the Lithuanian Basketball League (LKL).

== National team career ==
Lambrecht played for Belgium U20 at the 2016 FIBA U20 European Championship.
