= Dimitrios Stamatis =

Greek basketball player

Dimitris Stamatis
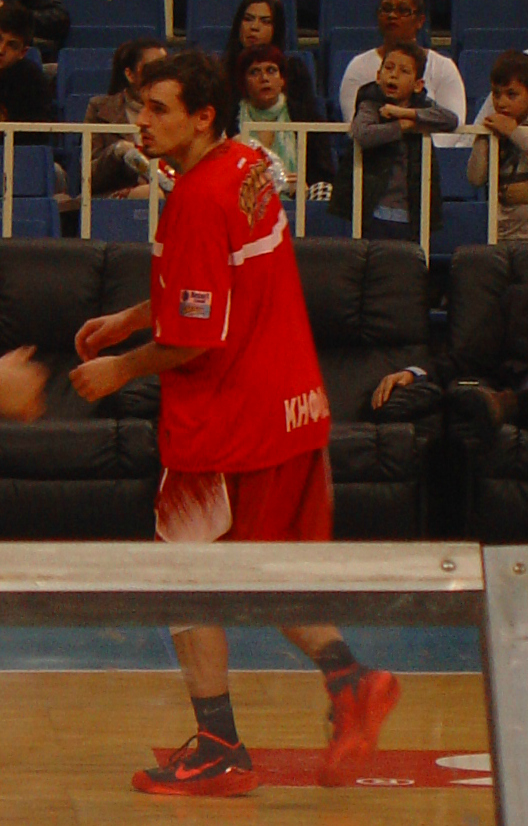
- Stamatis with Nea Kifissia in 2016

Personal information
- Born: January 12, 1996 (age 30) Maroussi, Greece
- Listed height: 6 ft 2 in (1.88 m)
- Listed weight: 190 lb (86 kg)

Career information
- Playing career: 2013–present
- Position: Point guard / shooting guard

Career history
- 2013–2015: Panionios
- 2015–2016: Nea Kifissia
- 2016–2017: Kymi
- 2017–2018: Kolossos Rodos
- 2018–2020: Ifaistos Limnos
- 2020–2021: Aris Thessaloniki
- 2021–2022: Iraklis Thessaloniki
- 2022–2024: Mykonos
- 2024: Iraklis
- 2025: Viola Reggio Calabria

Career highlights
- Jordan Brand Classic (2012)
Medals
Representing Greece
Men's basketball
FIBA Europe Under-20 Championship B
Bronze medal – third place	2016 Greece	Under-20

Dimitrios Stamatis (alternate spelling: Dimitris) (Greek: Δημήτρης Σταμάτης; born January 12, 1996) is a Greek professional basketball player. He is 1.88 m (6 ft 2 in) tall. He can play at both the point guard and shooting guard positions. His father, Antonios Stamatis, was also a professional basketball player.

== Professional career ==
In 2012, Stamatis played at the Jordan Brand Classic International game. After playing basketball with the youth teams of AGOG Evriali, Stamatis began his pro career in 2013, with the Greek League club Panionios. In November 2015, Stamatis joined Nea Kifissia of the Greek Basket League.

In August 2016, he joined Kymis. He moved to the Greek club Kolossos Rhodes in 2017. He joined Ifaistos Limnou in 2018. Stamatis averaged 4.6 points per game during the 2019–20 season. He signed with Aris Thessaloniki of the Greek Basket League on September 24, 2020.

On November 4, 2021, Stamatis signed with Iraklis. In 18 games, he averaged 6.9 points, 1.6 rebounds and 2.5 assists, playing around 24 minutes per contest.

== National team career ==
Stamatis was a member of the Greek junior national teams. With the junior national teams of Greece, he played at some of the following tournaments: the 2011 FIBA Europe Under-16 Championship, the 2012 FIBA Europe Under-16 Championship, the 2013 FIBA Europe Under-18 Championship, the 2014 FIBA Europe Under-18 Championship. He also played at the 2015 FIBA Under-19 World Cup, the 2015 FIBA Europe Under-20 Championship, and the 2nd division 2016 FIBA Europe Under-20 Championship Division B, where he won a bronze medal.
