= Orr Leumi =

Israeli basketball player (born 1996)

Orr Leumi אור לאומי
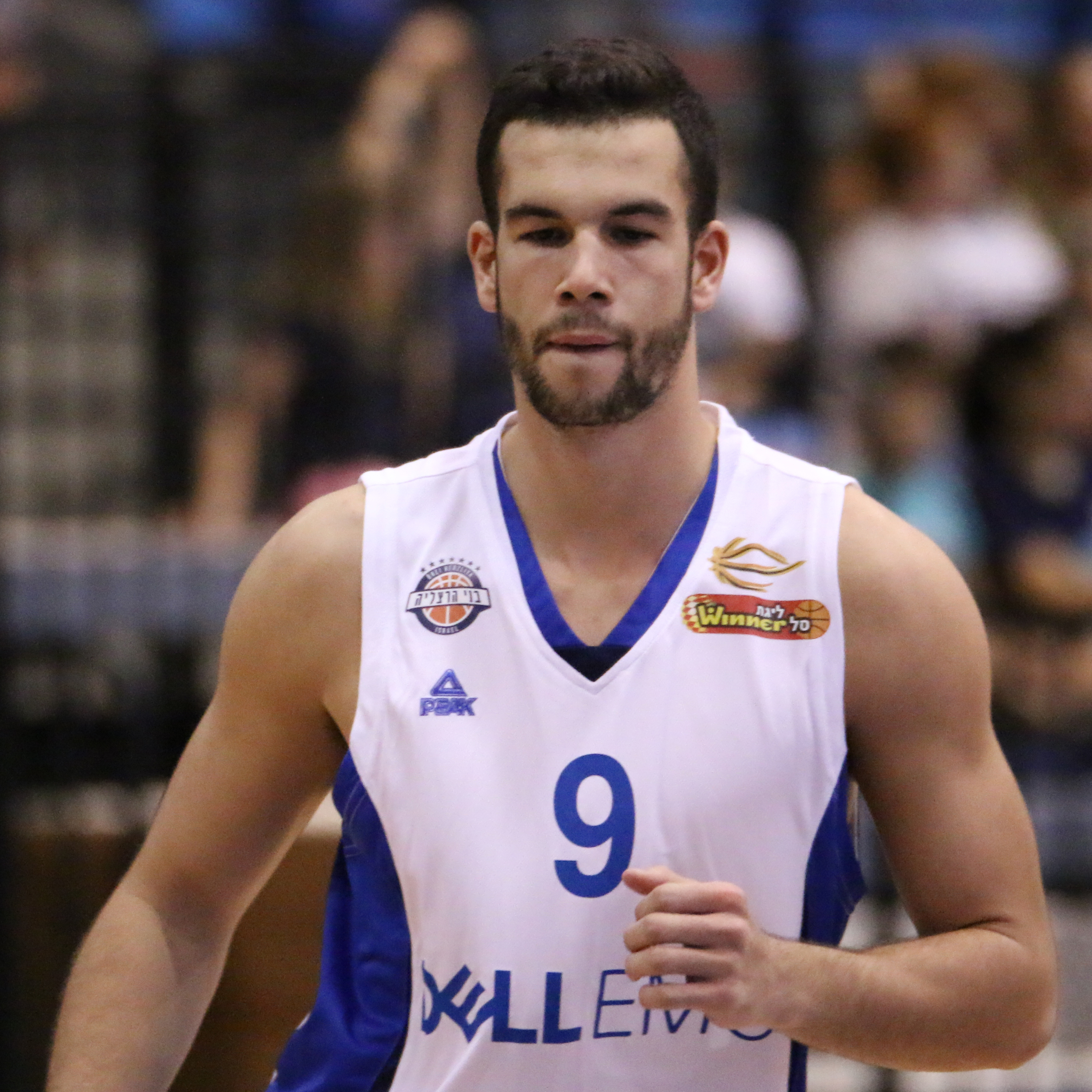
- Leumi with Bnei Herzliya in October 2016

No. 9 – Hapoel Be'er Sheva
- Position: Shooting guard
- League: Israeli Premier League

Personal information
- Born: October 25, 1996 (age 30) Petah Tikva, Israel
- Listed height: 1.93 m (6 ft 4 in)

Career information
- High school: Bishop Gorman (Summerlin, Nevada)
- NBA draft: 2017: undrafted
- Playing career: 2014–present

Career history
- 2014–2015: Maccabi Tel Aviv
- 2014–2015: →Ironi Ramat Gan
- 2015–2016: Elitzur Ashkelon
- 2016: Ironi Ramat Gan
- 2016–2020: Bnei Herzliya
- 2020–2021: Ironi Nahariya
- 2021–present: Hapoel Be'er Sheva

Career highlights
- Israeli Cup winner (2015)

Orr Leumi (Hebrew: אור לאומי; born October 25, 1996) is an Israeli former professional basketball player. Standing at 6 ft 4 in (1.93 m), he played at the shooting guard position.

== Early life ==
Leumi was born in Petah Tikva, Israel. He grew up in Tel Aviv and played basketball for the Maccabi Tel Aviv youth team.

Leumi played high school basketball at Bishop Gorman High School in Summerlin, Nevada.

== Professional career ==
=== Early years (2014–2016) ===
In 2014, Leumi started his professional career with Maccabi Tel Aviv and Ironi Ramat Gan as part of a two-way contract. On November 17, 2014, Leumi made his debut with Maccabi in a win over Hapoel Gilboa Galil.

On October 20, 2015, Leumi signed with Elitzur Ashkelon of the Israeli National League. In 19 games played during the 2015–16 season, he averaged 15.8 points, 2.1 rebounds and 3.2 assists per game.

On March 13, 2016, Leumi parted ways with Ashkelon to join Ironi Ramat Gan for the rest of the season.

=== Bnei Herzliya (2016–2020) ===
On June 23, 2016, Leumi signed a three-year deal with Hapoel Tel Aviv. On September 26, 2016, Leumi was loaned to Bnei Herzliya. On May 3, 2017, Leumi recorded a career-high 23 points, shooting 8-of-14 from the field, along with three rebounds, three assists and three steals in a 96–94 overtime win over Maccabi Haifa. He was subsequently named Israeli League Round 30 MVP. Leumi helped Herzliya reach the 2017 Israeli League Playoffs as the fifth seed, but they eventually were eliminated by Maccabi Tel Aviv in the Quarterfinals.

In his second year with Herzliya, Leumi sat out the entire 2017–18 season due to Infectious mononucleosis.

On August 10, 2018, Leumi officially parted ways with Hapoel Tel Aviv to join Bnei Herzliya, signing a two-year deal. On November 8, 2018, Leumi scored a game-winner shot with 2.1 seconds left, giving Herzliya a 77–76 win over Hapoel Tel Aviv. On December 8, 2018, Lemui recorded a season-high 22 points, shooting 8-of-11 from the field, along with three rebounds and three assists, leading Herzliya to a 105–78 win over Hapoel Gilboa Galil.

On August 27, 2019, Leumi signed a one-year contract extension with Herzliya.

=== Ironi Nahariya (2020–2021) ===
On August 11, 2020, Leumi signed with Ironi Nahariya of the Israeli Premier League.

=== Hapoel Be'er Sheva (2021–present) ===
On July 16, 2021, he has signed with Hapoel Be'er Sheva of the Israeli Basketball Premier League. On August 31, 2021, Leumi announced his retirement from basketball.

== National team career ==
Leumi was a member of the U-18 and U-20 Israeli national teams.

In July 2016, Leumi participated in the 2016 FIBA Europe Under-20 Championship, where he averaged 12 points, 3.3 rebounds and 2.9 assists per game.
