= Ventspils Olympic Center Basketball Hall =

Sports venue in Ventspils, Latvia

Ventspils Olympic Center
- Ventspils Basketball Hall
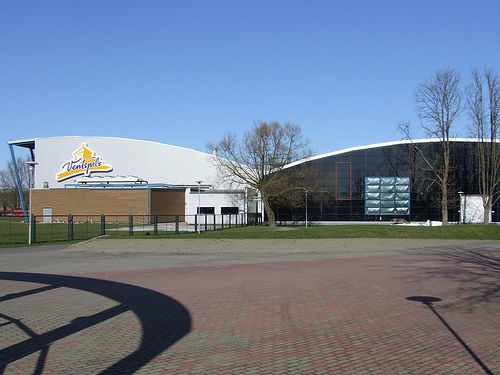
- Interactive map of Ventspils Olympic Center
- Full name: Ventspils Olympic Center Basketball Hall
- Location: Ventspils, Latvia
- Coordinates: 57.38794°N 21.5721°E
- Capacity: Basketball: 3,085
- Surface: Parquet

Construction
- Opened: October 25, 1997

Tenant
- BK Ventspils

Ventspils Olympic Center Basketball Hall is a multi-purpose indoor sports arena that is located in Ventspils, Latvia. It is a part of the Ventspils Olympic Center, which also includes a 3,200 seat football stadium. The arena is mainly used to host basketball and volleyball games, boxing and wrestling matches, gymnastics, badminton and tennis matches, and martial arts sports. The arena has a seating capacity of 3,085 for basketball games.

== Features ==
Ventspils Olympic Center features a fitness and weight training gym, a gymnastics training room, a sauna complex area, a physical therapy and medical office, a cafe, and a media press room.

== History ==
Ventspils Olympic Center opened in 1997, and it has since been used as the home arena of the Latvian professional basketball club, BK Ventspils, of the Latvian Basketball League (LBL). The arena was used to host group stage games of the 2012 FIBA Europe Under-16 Championship, and the 2013 FIBA Europe Under-18 Championship.

== See also ==
- Ventspils Olympic Center Stadium
- List of indoor arenas in Latvia
