= Sebastian Schmitt =

German basketball player (born 1996)

No. 4 – MLP Academics Heidelberg
- Position: Point guard
- League: ProA

Personal information
- Born: February 29, 1996 (age 30) Rosenheim, Germany
- Listed height: 6 ft 0.5 in (1.84 m)
- Listed weight: 183 lb (83 kg)

Career information
- Playing career: 2015–present

Career history
- 2015–2016: Bayern Munich
- 2016–2017: Eisbären Bremerhaven
- 2018–present: Academics Heidelberg

Sebastian Schmitt (born February 29, 1996) is a German professional basketball player who plays for Academics Heidelberg of the ProA. In the past, he played for Eisbären Bremerhaven of the Basketball Bundesliga (BBL).

== Professional career ==
After playing with the youth teams of Bayern Munich, Schmitt began his professional career with the reserve team of Bayern Munich in the German 4th Division. In the 2015-16 season he debuted in the German 1st Division for Bayern.

On September 8, 2016, Schmitt signed a one-year contract with Eisbären Bremerhaven.
