= Federico Mussini =

Italian basketball player (born 1996)

Pallalcesto Amatori Udine
- Position: Point guard
- League: Serie A2

Personal information
- Born: 12 March 1996 (age 30) Reggio Emilia, Italy
- Listed height: 1.88 m (6 ft 2 in)
- Listed weight: 82 kg (181 lb)

Career information
- College: St. John's (2015–2017)
- NBA draft: 2018: undrafted
- Playing career: 2012–present

Career history
- 2012–2015: Reggiana
- 2017–2019: Reggiana
- 2018: →Trieste
- 2019–2020: VL Pesaro
- 2020: Trieste
- 2021-present: APU Udine

Career highlights
- EuroChallenge champion (2014); Nike Hoop Summit (2015); Jordan Brand Classic (2012)

Federico Mussini (born 12 March 1996) is an Italian basketball player for Pallalcesto Amatori Udine of the Italian Serie A2 Basket, second tier national championship.

== Career ==
Federico Mussini made his debut for Grissin Bon Reggio Emilia in May 2013 against Pallacanestro Virtus Roma, but only played one minute.

In the 2013-14 season, Mussini only played in 9 total games for Reggio Emilia, but he played 11.6 minutes per game on the way to Reggio Emilia winning the 2013–14 EuroChallenge.

Mussini was loaned to Stella Azzurra Roma for the 2013-14 Nike International Junior Tournament, where he was named to the All-Tournament team after averaging 19.2 points, 3.2 rebounds, 1.8 assists, and 2.5 steals.

In the 2014-15 season, Mussini saw increased role for Reggio Emilia as a back-up point guard to Andrea Cinciarini.

With Mussini drawing strong interest from the NCAA, Reggio Emilia reportedly offered him a 5-year contract. Mussini said that he planned to decide his future by the end of April 2015 with Gonzaga, St. John's, and Davidson among the colleges he would most likely choose if he decides to leave Reggio Emilia.

On 29 June 2015 Mussini committed to play college basketball for the St. John's Red Storm.

On 6 June 2017 Mussini officially left St. John's to return in Italy and signed a three-year deal with Pallacanestro Reggiana.

On 30 March 2018 Mussini officially joined Pallacanestro Trieste on loan for 2017–18 Serie A2 season.

On 10 July 2018 Mussini returned to Reggiana. He finished last season on loan in Trieste conquering the promotion in LBA.

On 5 July 2019 he has signed with VL Pesaro of the Lega Basket Serie A (LBA).

On 9 October 2020 while the season had just started, Mussini signed a short-term contract with Trieste, which was facing many injury problems.

On 7 January 2021 he signed for Pallalcesto Amatori Udine in the Serie A2 Basket, second tier national championship.

== International career ==
Mussini was invited to play in the 2012 Jordan Brand Classic where he led the White International team to victory over the Blue International team with a game-high 21 points, 4 rebounds, 4 assists, and 2 steals.

Mussini joined the Under-16 Italian national team in 2012, where he led Italy to fourth place and was named to the All-Tournament team. Mussini averaged 14.6 points, 3.8 rebounds, 2.1 assists, 1.8 steals, along with a tournament high 52.2% 3-point field goal percentage.

Mussini was a member of the 2014 Italian Under-18 team that played in the Albert Schweitzer Tournament, where he led Italy to first place over USA. Mussini had 20 points, 7 rebounds, and 6 assists in the championship game. Mussini was named to the All-Tournament team after averaging 20.3 points, 3.9 rebounds, 3.4 assists, and 1.4 steals.

Mussini played for the Under-18 Italian national team in 2014, where he led Italy to sixth place and was named to the All-Tournament team. Mussini averaged 22.6 points, 4.0 rebounds, 2.1 assists, 1.4 steals, and 42.9% 3-point field goal percentage. Mussini led the tournament field in points per game, field goals made per game (7.6), 3 point field goals made per game (3.0), field goals attempted per game (16.2), and 3 point field goals attempted per game (7.0).

In 2015, Mussini was invited to play for the World Select Team in the Nike Hoop Summit where he scored 9 points and dished out 3 assists in a winning effort offer the USA Select Team.

== Statistics ==
=== College statistics ===
Year	Team	GP	GS	MPG	FG%	3P%	FT%	RPG	APG	SPG	BPG	PPG
2015–16	St. John's	32	23	29.3	.338	.304	.862	2.4	2.2	1.2	0.1	10.7
2016–17	St. John's	30	2	19.3	.410	.427	.854	1.7	0.9	0.6	0.0	8.2
