= Marc García (basketball) =

Spanish basketball player (born 1996)

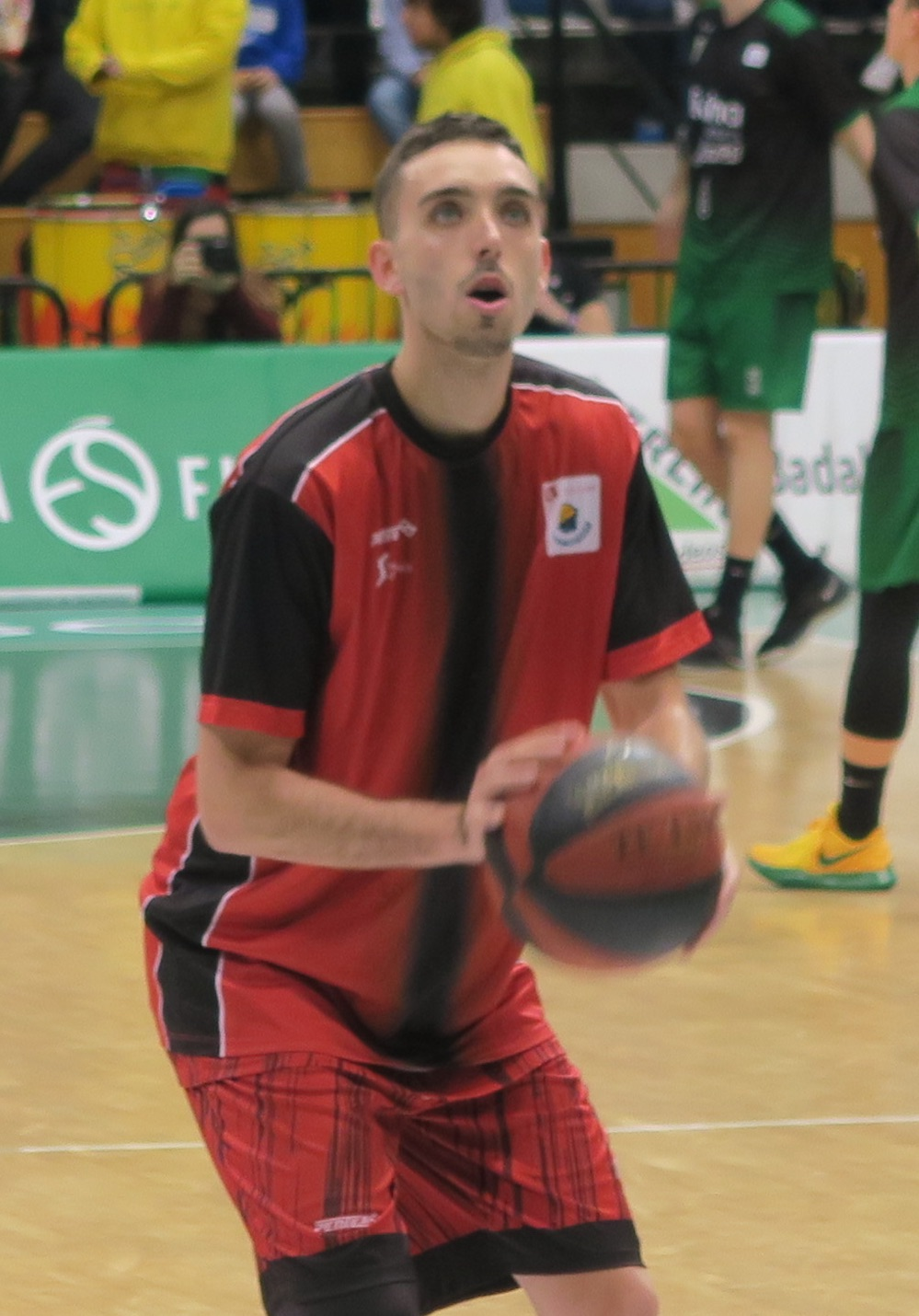

Free Agent
- Position: Shooting guard

Personal information
- Born: 7 March 1996 (age 30) Manresa, Spain
- Listed height: 6 ft 6 in (1.98 m)
- Listed weight: 180 lb (82 kg)

Career information
- Playing career: 2012–present

Career history
- 2012–2018: FC Barcelona
- 2014–2015: →Manresa
- 2016–2017: →Real Betis Energía Plus
- 2018–2021: Fuenlabrada
- 2021–2022: San Pablo Burgos
- 2022: Río Breogán
- 2022–2023: Fuenlabrada
- 2023–2024: MKS Dąbrowa Górnicza
- 2024–2025: Krka Novo Mesto
- 2025: MKS Dąbrowa Górnicza
- 2025–2026: Górnik Wałbrzych

Career highlights
- Liga ACB champion (2014); Spanish Cup winner (2018); LEB Oro Rising Star (2016); FIBA Europe Under-20 Championship MVP (2016)
Medals
Men's basketball
Representing Spain
FIBA Europe Under-20 Championship
Gold medal – first place	2016 Helsinki	Spain
FIBA Europe Under-18 Championship
Bronze medal – third place	2013 Latvia	Spain

Marc García Antonell (born 7 March 1996) is a Spanish professional basketball player who last played for Górnik Wałbrzych of the Polish Basketball League (PLK). He is considered one of the most promising young Spanish players of his generation.

== Professional career ==
García came through the youth ranks of Bàsquet Manresa, before transferring to FC Barcelona B, where he spent his first senior season (2012–13). In the summer of 2014, he returned to Manresa on a loan deal, making his first steps in Spain's elite league ACB during the 2014-15 campaign. After one year with Manresa's men's squad, he headed back to Barca B, leading the team in scoring (16.2ppg) in the 2015-16 LEB Oro season.

In July 2016, García was sent to ACB outfit CB Sevilla on a two-year loan deal. However, after the relegation of the Andalusian team, Barcelona terminated the loan.

On 20 July 2018 García signed a three-year deal with Montakit Fuenlabrada of the Liga ACB.

On 23 July 2021 he signed with San Pablo Burgos of the Spanish Liga ACB.

On 13 August 2022 he signed with Río Breogán of the Liga ACB.

On 15 October 2022 he signed with Fuenlabrada of the Liga ACB for a second stint.

On November 29, 2025, he signed with Górnik Wałbrzych of the Polish Basketball League (PLK).

== International career ==
García has competed on the Spain national under-18 basketball team at the junior levels, winning the bronze team medal at the 2013 FIBA Europe Under-18 Championship in Latvia.

== Awards and accomplishments ==
=== Club honours ===
- Ciutat de L'Hospitalet Tournament: All-Tournament Team, MVP (2013-2014)
- Nike International Junior Tournament: All-Tournament Team (2012-2013)

=== Spain national team ===
Junior national team

- 2013 FIBA Europe Under-18 Championship: Bronze

Youth national team

- 2016 FIBA Europe Under-20 Championship: Gold
