= Lovro Mazalin =

Croatian basketball player

No. 14 – Cibona
- Position: Power forward / center
- League: Croatian League; ABA League

Personal information
- Born: June 28, 1997 (age 29) Sisak, Croatia
- Listed height: 2.04 m (6 ft 8 in)
- Listed weight: 95 kg (209 lb)

Career information
- NBA draft: 2019: undrafted
- Playing career: 2013–present

Career history
- 2013–2017: Cedevita
- 2016–2017: →Zadar
- 2017–2018: Zaragoza
- 2018–2019: Spars Sarajevo
- 2019–2021: Gorica
- 2021–2022: Poitiers Basket 86
- 2022–2023: Cibona
- 2023–2026: Zadar
- 2026–present: Cibona

Career highlights
- 6× Croatian League champion (2013–2016, 2024, 2025); 6× Croatian Cup winner (2013–2016, 2023, 2024)
Medals
Men's basketball
Representing Croatia
FIBA Europe Under-18 Championship
Silver medal – second place	2013 Latvia	U-18 Team
Bronze medal – third place	2014 Turkey	U-18 Team

Lovro Mazalin (born 28 June 1997) is a Croatian professional basketball player currently playing for Cibona Zagreb of the Croatian League and the ABA League.

== Professional career ==
Mazalin spent two years in Cibona's youth system before moving to city rivals Cedevita in July 2013.

Mazalin was chosen as the most valuable player of the Croatian League All Star 2015 in Rijeka, scoring 25 points and dominating the exhibition game alongside another young player Ante Žižić, who scored 33.

Mazalin signed a new four-year deal with Cedevita in March 2015.

On August 19, 2016, Mazalin was loaned to KK Zadar.
