= Cyrille Eliezer-Vanerot =

French basketball player (born 1996)

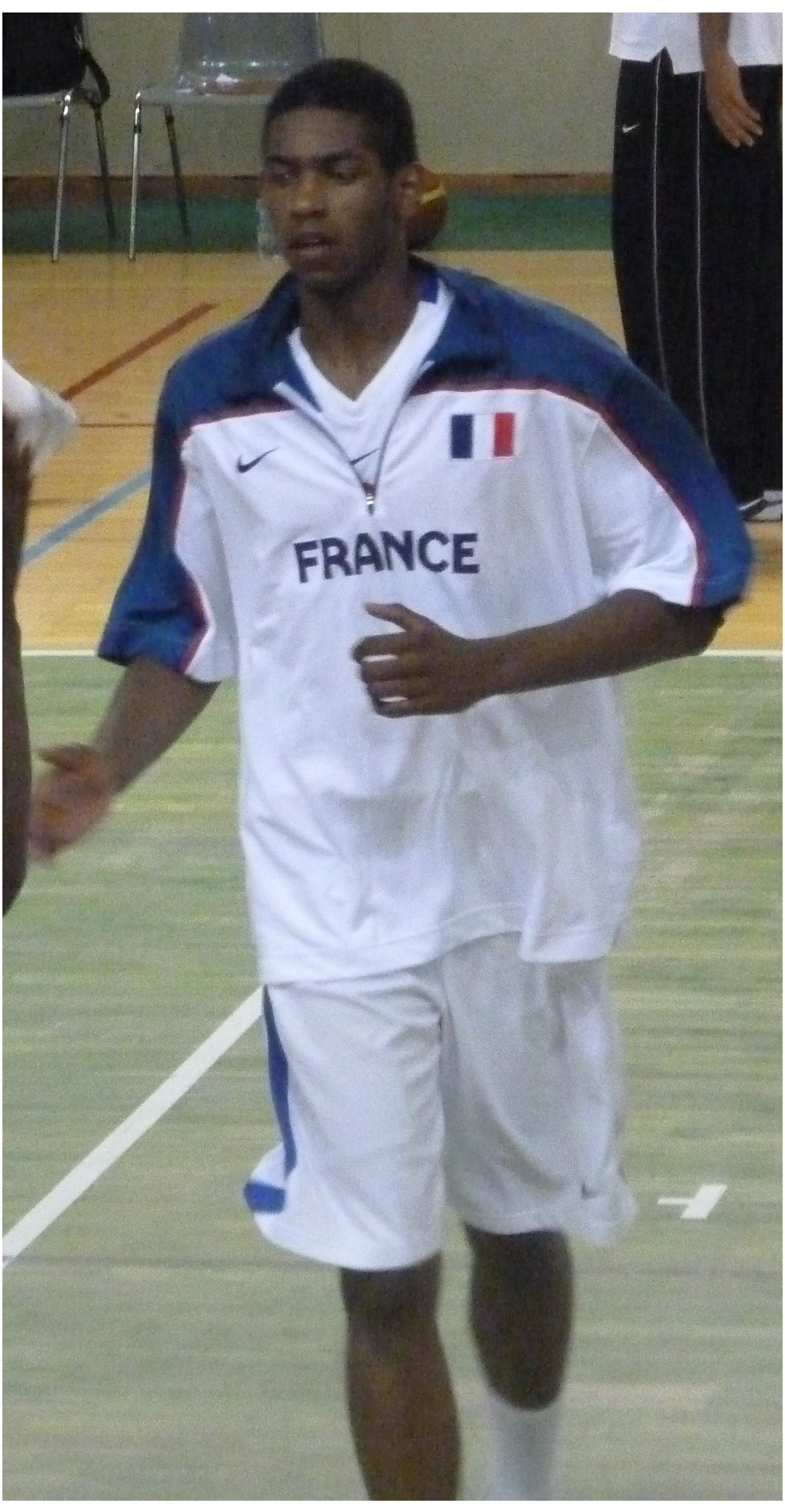

No. 7 – Boulazac Basket Dordogne
- Position: Small forward
- League: Betlic ÉLITE

Personal information
- Born: August 1, 1996 (age 30) Chatenay-Malabry, France
- Listed height: 6 ft 8 in (2.03 m)

Career information
- Playing career: 2011–present

Career history
- 2011–2014: INSEP
- 2014–2019: Levallois Metropolitans
- 2019–2021: ESSM Le Portel
- 2021–2023: Alliance Sport Alsace
- 2023–2024: Saint-Chamond BVG
- 2024–present: Boulazac Basket Dordogne

Cyrille Eliezer-Vanerot (born August 1, 1996) is a French professional basketball player for Boulazac Basket Dordogne of the LNB Élite.

== Professional career ==
Between 2010 and 2014, he attended INSEP, the French National Institute of Sport, expertise, and performance. In his final year at INSEP (2013–14), he averaged 12 points, 3.7 rebounds and 1.7 assists a game in the NM1, the third-tier of French basketball.

In 2014, Eliezer-Vanerot signed with Paris-Levallois Basket of the LNB Pro A.

=== International career ===
He won silver at the 2012 European Championships with the French under-16 national team. He also played at the 2014 Albert-Schweitzer-Tournament, the 2014 U18 European Championships and the 2016 U20 European Championships.
