= Vasilije Vučetić =

Serbian basketball player (born 1996)

No. 33 – Palencia Baloncesto
- Position: Center / power forward
- League: Primera FEB

Personal information
- Born: May 4, 1996 (age 30) Vrbas, FR Yugoslavia
- Listed height: 2.08 m (6 ft 10 in)

Career information
- NBA draft: 2018: undrafted
- Playing career: 2013–present

Career history
- 2013–2016: Union Olimpija
- 2016–2018: Bilbao Basket
- 2016–2017: →Ametx Zornotza
- 2018: →Iraurgi
- 2018–2019: Melilla
- 2019–2020: CB Peñas Huesca
- 2020–2021: Krka
- 2021–2022: Vojvodina
- 2022–2023: Força Lleida
- 2023–2024: Vojvodina
- 2024–2025: CB Valladolid
- 2025–2026: Palayesh Naft Abadan BC
- 2026–present: Palencia

Career highlights
- Slovenian Cup winner (2021)
Medals
Men's basketball
Representing Serbia
U18 European Championship
| Silver medal – second place | 2014 Turkey | Team |
FIBA Europe Under-16 Championship
| Bronze medal – third place | 2012 Lithuania & Latvia | Team |

Vasilije Vučetić (Serbian Cyrillic: Василије Вучетић; born 4 May 1996) is a Serbian professional basketball player for Palencia Baloncesto of the Spanish Primera FEB. He is a 2.08 m tall center who can also play the power forward position.

He joined CB Peñas Huesca in 2019. Vučetić averaged 14 points and 5.5 rebounds per game. He signed with Krka on 31 August 2020.

In February 2026, he signed for Palencia Baloncesto of the Spanish Primera FEB.
