= List of European basketball players in the United States =

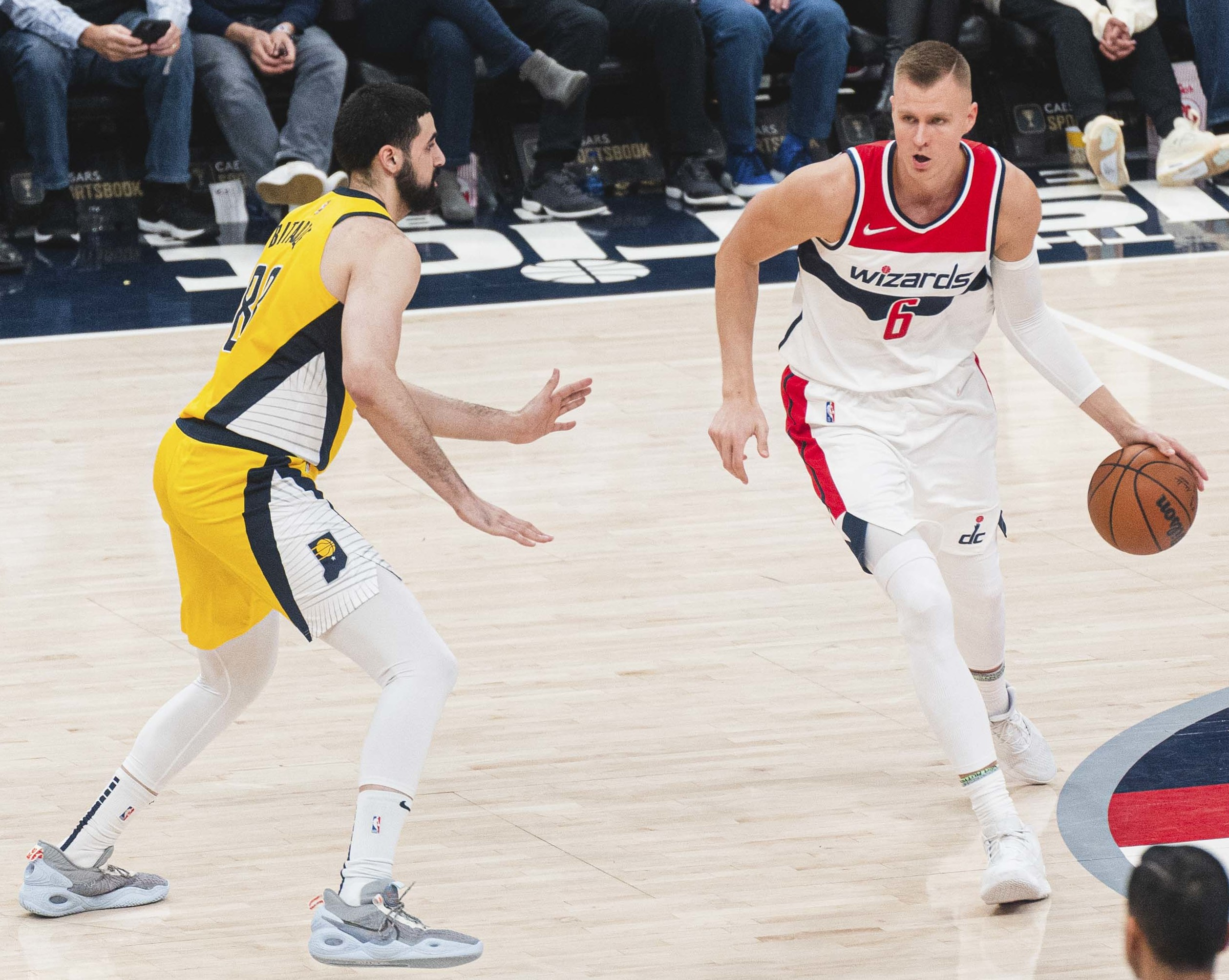
Goga Bitadze (left) of Georgia defends Kristaps Porziņģis of Latvia during a 2022 game between the Indiana Pacers and Washington Wizards at Capital One Arena in Washington, D.C.

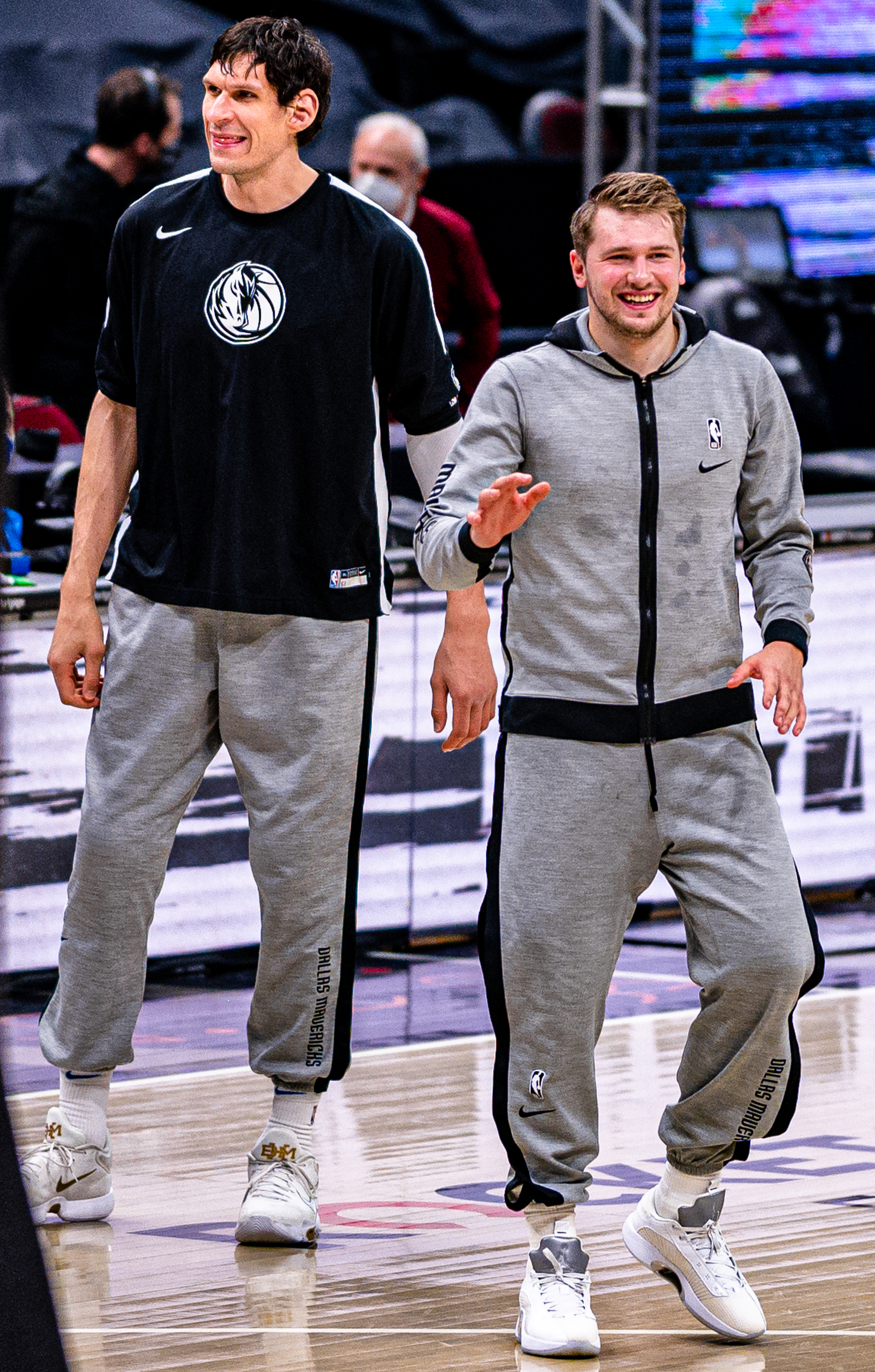
Dallas Mavericks teammates Boban Marjanović (left) of Serbia and Luka Dončić of Slovenia before a 2021 game at Rocket Mortgage FieldHouse in Cleveland

This is a list of European basketball players who have played in the United States at either professional or NCAA Division I level. It is intended to include players who are currently active, whether inside or outside the U.S., and former players (both living and deceased).

For the purpose of this article, a "European player in the United States" is defined as a citizen of a FIBA Europe member country who was playing in the U.S. while a citizen of said country. Examples of players who do not fall within this definition are:

- Howard Carter, who became a naturalized citizen of France after having played professionally in that country, and never played in the U.S. while a French citizen.
- Jeff Taylor, whose story is similar to that of Carter, except that his eventual country of citizenship was Sweden. However, his son Jeffery, born in Sweden as a dual citizen of both the U.S. and Sweden, is listed.
- Kelenna Azubuike, who despite being born and raised in the United Kingdom has never held British citizenship. He was born a Nigerian citizen.
- Admiral Schofield, born in the UK to a U.S. military family. Since 1983, children born under these circumstances will not have British nationality unless a parent had such nationality. He was born in 1997 to parents who hold only U.S. nationality.

In addition, NBA players are considered to be playing in the United States even if they have played only for a Canada-based team (currently the Toronto Raptors, and in the past the Vancouver Grizzlies and Toronto Huskies). Similarly, those who have played in what is now the NBA G League are considered to be playing in the United States even if they have only played for the Raptors' Canada-based affiliate, Raptors 905.

Players still active in the United States are bolded. Players active in a league in another country are written in italics.

Players listed as being a dual citizen have their country of birth indicated first.

== Austria ==
=== NBA/WNBA ===
- **Jakob Pöltl** – Utah Utes, Raptors 905, Toronto Raptors, San Antonio Spurs

=== G League/College ===
- Giorgi Bezhanishvili (dual Georgian/Austrian citizen) – Illinois Fighting Illini, Grand Rapids Gold, College Park Skyhawks, Iowa Wolves
- Luka Brajkovic – Davidson Wildcats

== Belarus ==
=== NBA/WNBA ===
- Yelena Leuchanka – West Virginia Mountaineers, Charlotte Sting, Washington Mystics, Atlanta Dream

=== G League/College ===
- Nikolai Alexeev – Buffalo Bulls
- **Yauhen Massalski** – San Francisco Dons, Austin Spurs
- Artsiom Parakhouski – Radford Highlanders
- Dzmitry Ryuny – San Francisco Dons, Oregon State

== Belgium ==
=== NBA/WNBA ===
- **Julie Allemand** – Indiana Fever, Chicago Sky, Los Angeles Sparks
- Hind Ben Abdelkader – Indiana Fever
- **Toumani Camara** – Portland Trail Blazers
- Kyara Linskens – Golden State Valkyries
- D. J. Mbenga – Four NBA teams
- Emma Meesseman – Washington Mystics, Chicago Sky
- Kim Mestdagh – Washington Mystics
- **Ajay Mitchell** – UC Santa Barbara Gauchos, Oklahoma City Thunder
- **Julie Vanloo** – Washington Mystics, Golden State Valkyries
- Ann Wauters – Four WNBA teams

=== G League/College ===
- Retin Obasohan – Alabama Crimson Tide
- Kristof Ongenaet – Syracuse Orange

== Bosnia and Herzegovina ==
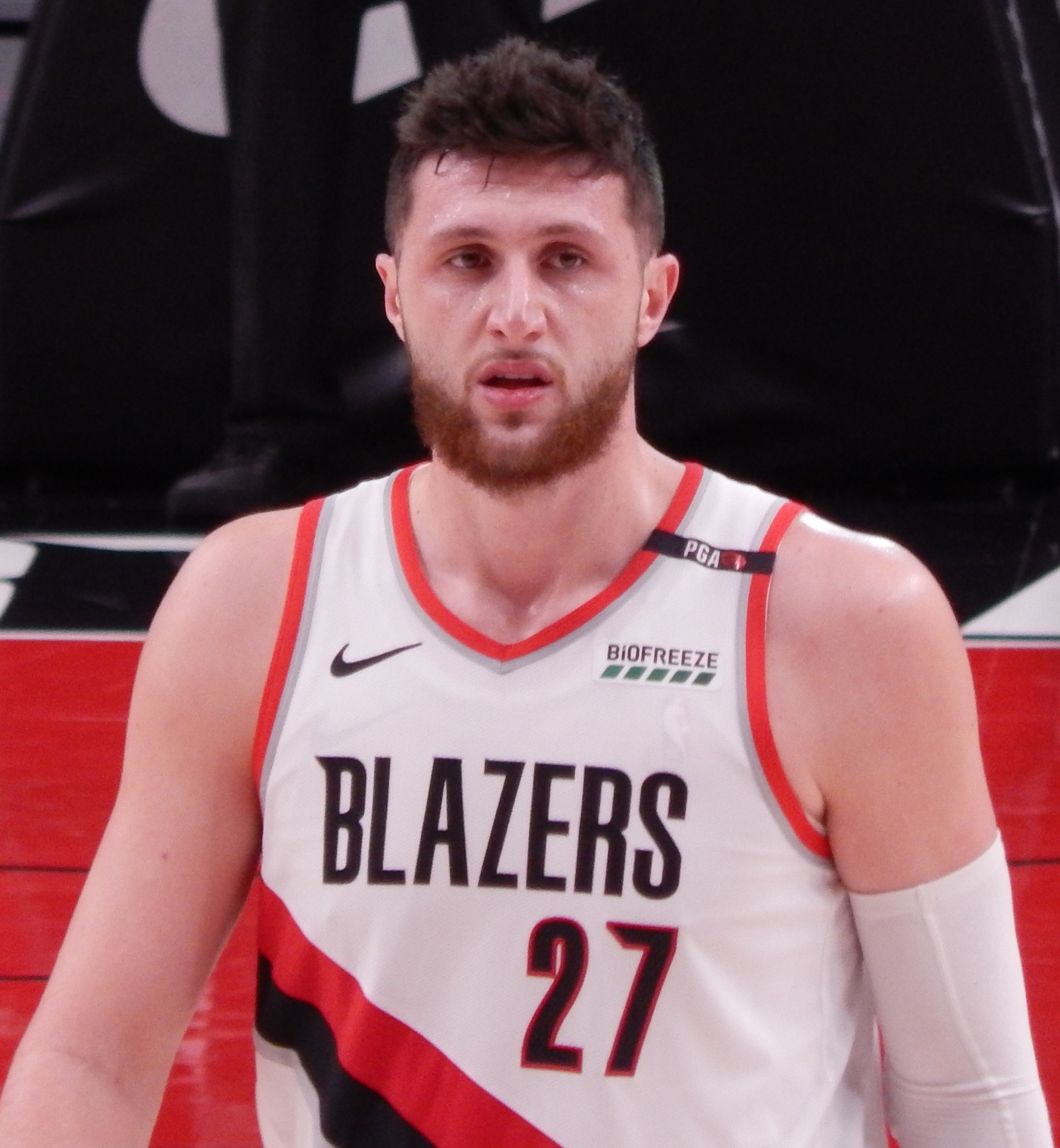
Jusuf Nurkić with the Portland Trail Blazers in 2019

=== NBA/WNBA ===
- Luka Garza – Iowa Hawkeyes, Minnesota Timberwolves, Boston Celtics
- Razija Mujanović – Detroit Shock
- Džanan Musa – Brooklyn Nets
- **Jusuf Nurkić** – Denver Nuggets, Portland Trail Blazers, Phoenix Suns
- Aleksandar Radojević – Two NBA teams
- Rankica Šarenac – Phoenix Mercury
- Mirza Teletović – Three NBA teams
- Ratko Varda – Detroit Pistons

=== G League/College ===
- Amar Alibegović – St. John's Red Storm
- Adnan Hodžić – Lipscomb Bisons
- Ajdin Penava – Marshall Thundering Herd

== Bulgaria ==
=== NBA/WNBA ===
- Albena Branzova – New York Liberty
- Gergana Branzova – Detroit Shock
- Georgi Glouchkov – Phoenix Suns
- Gergana Slavtcheva – Phoenix Mercury
- Polina Tzekova – Houston Comets
- Aleksandar Vezenkov – Sacramento Kings

=== G League/College ===
- Ilian Evtimov (also holds French citizenship) – NC State Wolfpack
- Vassil Evtimov (also holds French citizenship) – North Carolina Tar Heels
- **Aleksandar Gavalyugov** – Villanova Wildcats

== Croatia ==
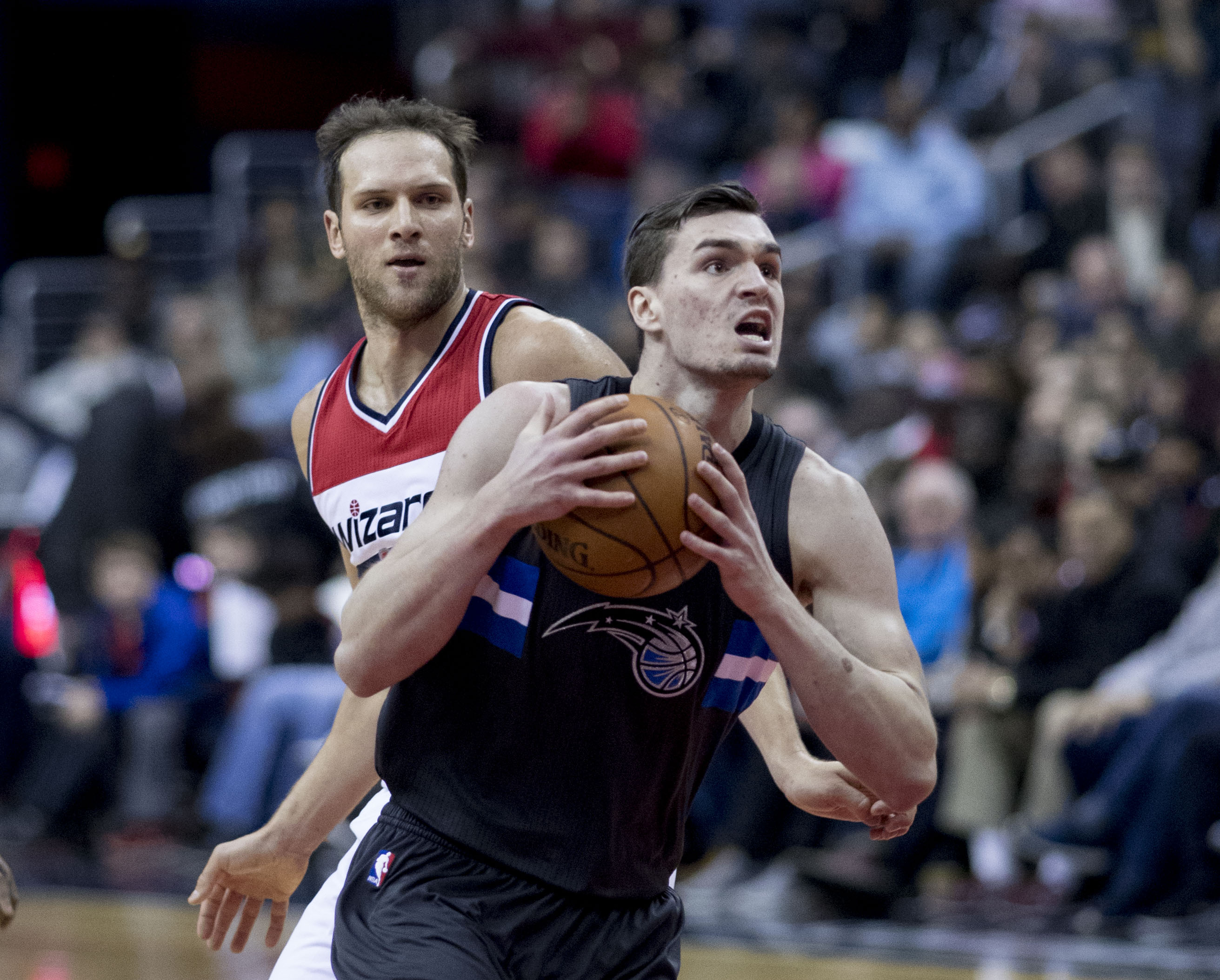
Bojan Bogdanović (left) of the Washington Wizards and Mario Hezonja (right) of the Orlando Magic during a 2017 game

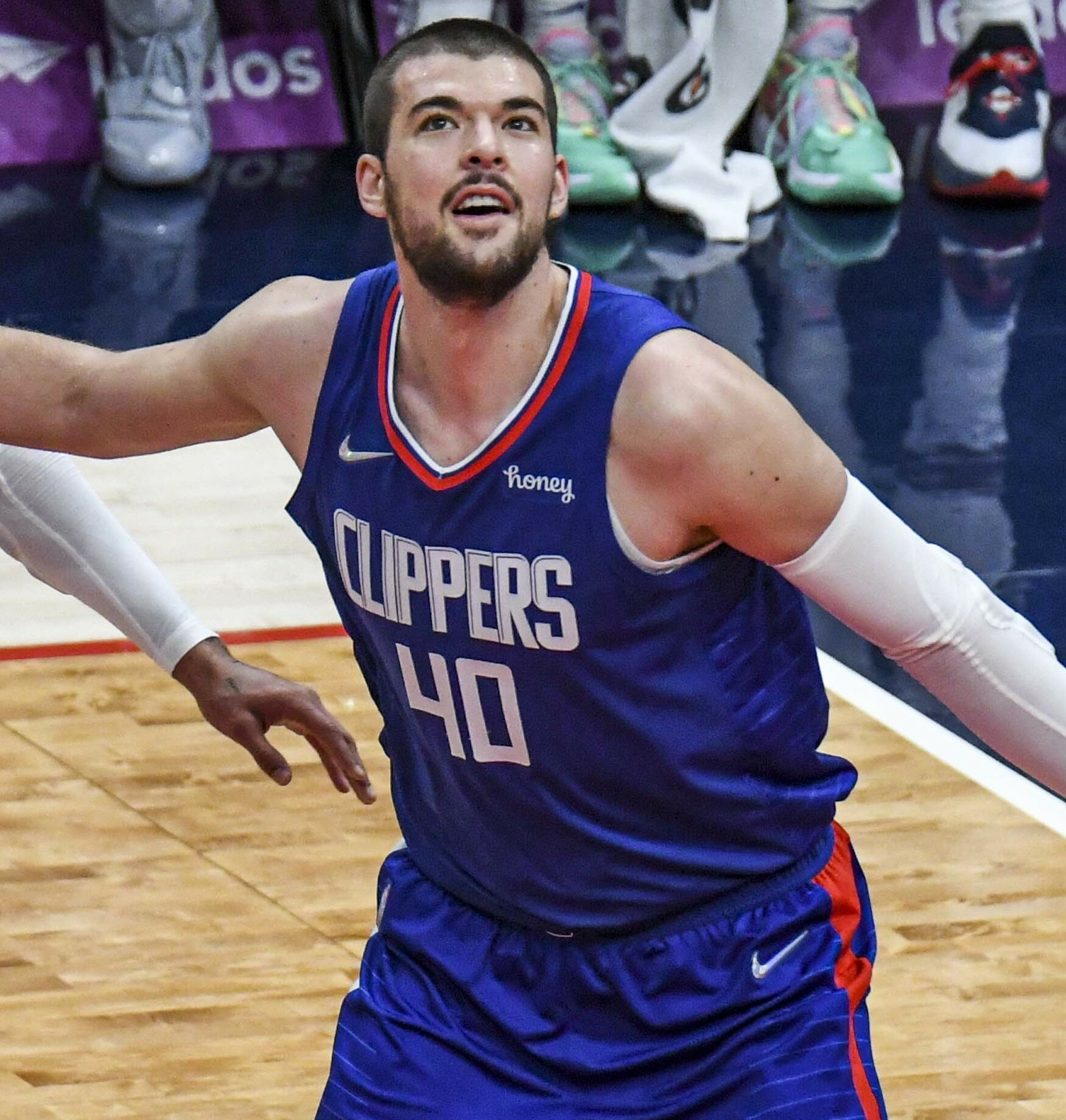
Ivica Zubac with the Los Angeles Clippers in 2022

=== NBA/WNBA ===
- Dalibor Bagarić – Chicago Bulls
- Dragan Bender – Phoenix Suns, Milwaukee Bucks
- **Bojan Bogdanović** – Brooklyn Nets, Washington Wizards, Indiana Pacers, Utah Jazz, Detroit Pistons
- Ivana Dojkić – Seattle Storm, New York Liberty
- Duje Dukan – Sacramento Kings
- Gordan Giriček – Five NBA teams
- Vedrana Grgin-Fonseca – Los Angeles Sparks
- Mario Hezonja – Orlando Magic, New York Knicks, Portland Trail Blazers
- Koraljka Hlede – Three WNBA teams
- Mario Kasun – Orlando Magic
- Toni Kukoč (also naturalized U.S. citizen)– Four NBA teams, most notably the Chicago Bulls
- Damir Markota (also holds Swedish citizenship) – Milwaukee Bucks, Tulsa 66ers
- **Karlo Matković** – New Orleans Pelicans, Birmingham Squadron
- **Nika Mühl** – Seattle Storm
- Dražen Petrović – Portland Trail Blazers, New Jersey Nets (died in 1993)
- Zoran Planinić – New Jersey Nets
- Dino Radja – Boston Celtics
- Damjan Rudež – Indiana Pacers, Minnesota Timberwolves, Orlando Magic
- Luka Šamanić – San Antonio Spurs, Austin Spurs, Westchester Knicks, Maine Celtics, Utah Jazz
- **Dario Šarić** – Philadelphia 76ers, Minnesota Timberwolves, Phoenix Suns, Oklahoma City Thunder, Golden State Warriors, Denver Nuggets
- Bruno Šundov – Five NBA teams
- Žan Tabak – Four NBA teams
- Roko Ukić – Toronto Raptors, Milwaukee Bucks
- Stojko Vranković – Three NBA teams
- Ante Žižić – Cleveland Cavaliers
- **Ivica Zubac** – Los Angeles Lakers, Los Angeles D-Fenders / South Bay Lakers, Los Angeles Clippers

=== G League/College ===
- Krešimir Ćosić – BYU Cougars
- **Tomislav Ivišić** – Illinois Fighting Illini
- **Zvonimir Ivišić** – Arkansas Razorbacks
- Marin Marić – Northern Illinois Huskies, DePaul Blue Demons
- Marin Mornar – Loyola Marymount Lions
- Davor Rimac – Arkansas Razorbacks
- Iva Slišković – South Carolina Gamecocks
- Goran Suton (also naturalized in the US) – Michigan State Spartans
- Antonio Vranković – Duke Blue Devils
- Tomislav Zubčić – Oklahoma City Blue

== Cyprus ==
=== G League/College ===
- Erten Gazi (dual Cypriot/Turkish citizen by birth) – DePaul Blue Demons, Fordham Rams

== Czech Republic ==
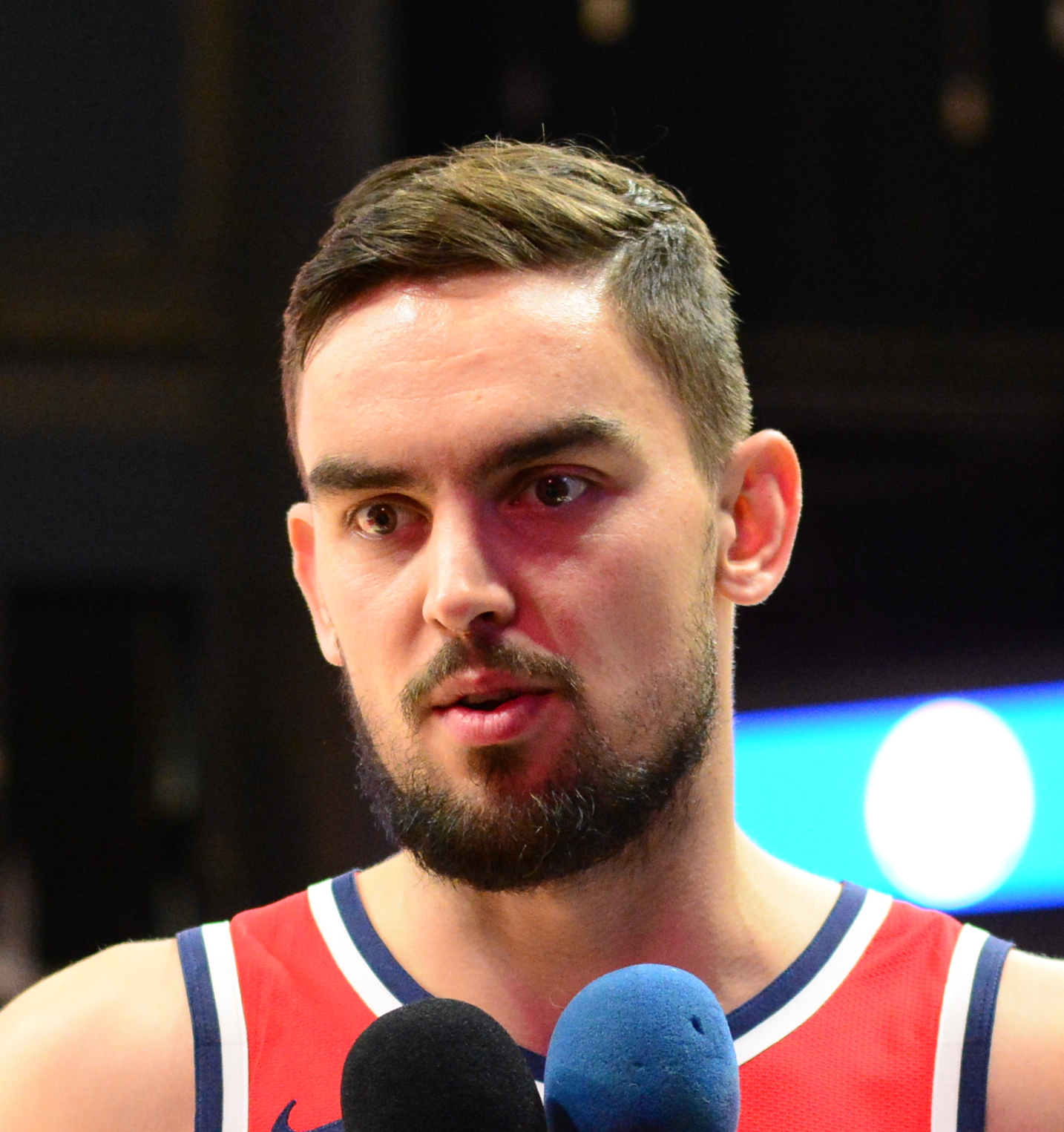
Tomáš Satoranský with the Washington Wizards in 2018

=== NBA/WNBA ===
- Eva Horáková – Cleveland Rockers
- Romana Hamzová – Orlando Miracle
- Zuzana Klimešová – Vanderbilt Commodores, Indiana Fever
- **Vít Krejčí** – Oklahoma City Thunder, Oklahoma City Blue, Atlanta Hawks, College Park Skyhawks, Iowa Wolves
- Michaela Pavlíčková – Denver Pioneers, Utah Starzz, Phoenix Mercury
- Tomáš Satoranský – Washington Wizards, Chicago Bulls, New Orleans Pelicans
- Jan Veselý – Washington Wizards, Denver Nuggets
- Jana Veselá – Seattle Storm
- Kamila Vodičková – Seattle Storm, Phoenix Mercury
- Jiří Welsch – Four NBA teams
- George Zidek – UCLA Bruins and three NBA teams

=== G League/College ===
- Patrik Auda – Seton Hall
- Luboš Bartoň – Valparaiso Crusaders
- Ilona Burgrová – South Carolina Gamecocks

== Denmark ==
=== NBA/WNBA ===
- Gabriel Lundberg – Phoenix Suns

=== G League/College ===
- Michael Andersen – Rhode Island Rams
- Chris Christoffersen – Oregon Ducks, Roanoke Dazzle
- Christian Drejer – Florida Gators
- David Knudsen – Marist Red Foxes
- Jacob Larsen – Gonzaga Bulldogs
- Asbjørn Midtgaard – Wichita State Shockers, Grand Canyon
- Inge Nissen – Old Dominion Lady Monarchs, Chicago Hustle
- Anne Thorius – Michigan Wolverines

== Estonia ==
=== NBA/WNBA ===
- Henri Drell – Windy City Bulls, Chicago Bulls
- Martin Müürsepp – Miami Heat, Dallas Mavericks

=== G League/College ===
- Janari Jõesaar – Ole Miss Rebels, UTPA Broncs/UTRGV Vaqueros
- Maik Kotsar – South Carolina Gamecocks
- **Kerr Kriisa** – Arizona Wildcats, West Virginia Mountaineers
- Rauno Nurger – Wichita State Shockers
- Matthias Tass – Saint Mary's Gaels
- Tanel Tein – St. Francis Brooklyn Terriers
- **Henri Veesaar** – Arizona Wildcats, North Carolina Tar Heels

== Finland ==
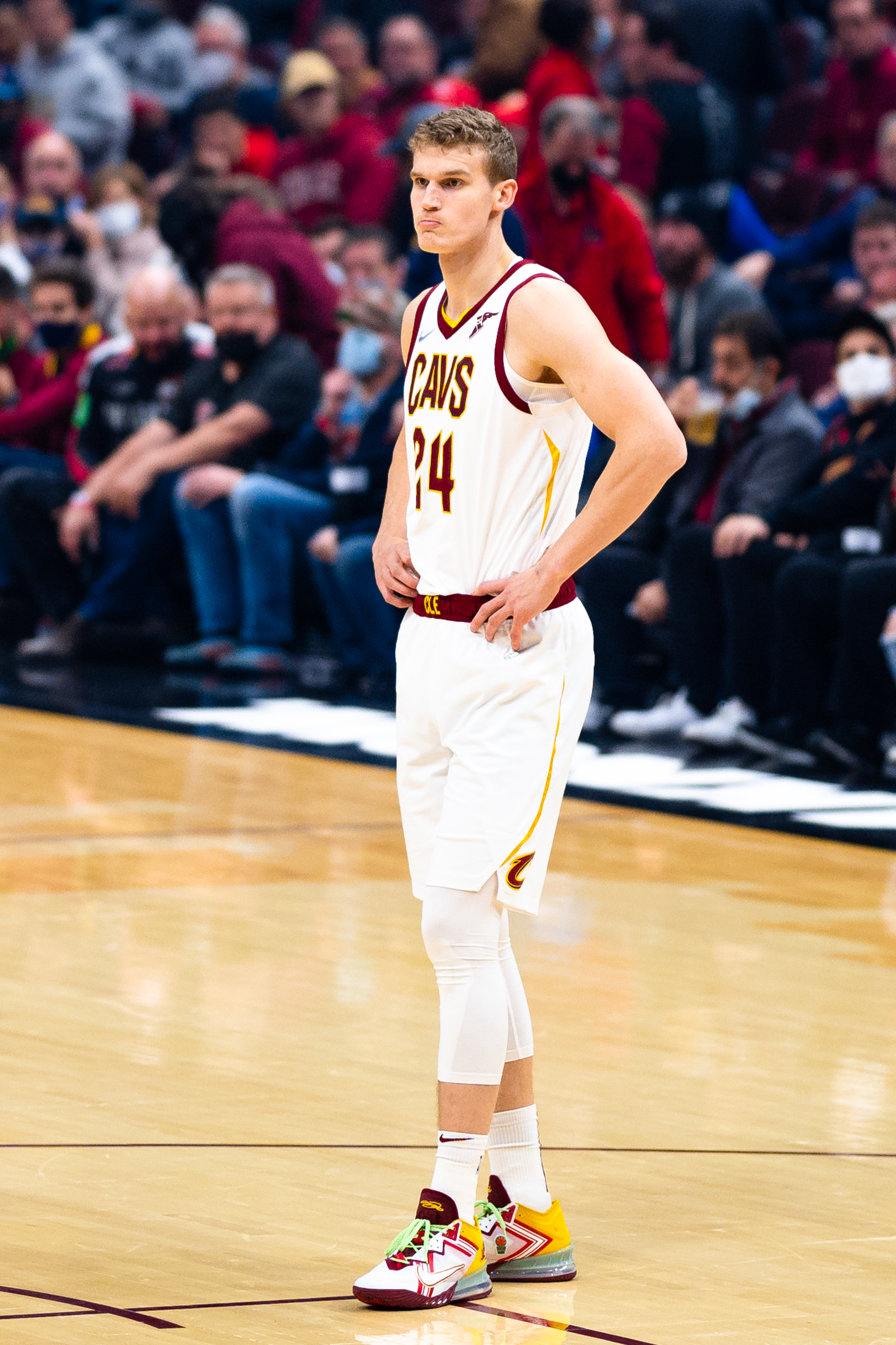
Lauri Markkanen with the Cleveland Cavaliers in 2021

=== NBA/WNBA ===
- **Awak Kuier** (dual Egyptian/Finnish citizen) – Dallas Wings
- **Lauri Markkanen** – Arizona Wildcats, Chicago Bulls, Cleveland Cavaliers, Utah Jazz
- Hanno Möttölä – Utah Utes, Atlanta Hawks
- Erik Murphy (dual US/Finnish citizen by birth) – Florida Gators, Chicago Bulls, Utah Jazz, Austin Spurs

=== G League/College ===
- Mustapha Amzil – Dayton Flyers, New Mexico Lobos
- Max Besselink – Santa Clara
- Joonas Cavén – Reno Bighorns
- Federiko Federiko – Northern Oklahoma, Pittsburgh Panthers, Texas Tech Red Raiders, Texas A&M Aggies
- Jacob Grandison (dual Finnish/US citizen by birth) – Holy Cross Crusaders, Illinois Fighting Illini, Duke Blue Devils
- Andre Gustavson – Richmond Spiders
- Samuel Haanpää – Valparaiso Crusaders
- Shawn Huff (dual Finnish/US citizen by birth) – Valparaiso Crusaders
- Shawn Hopkins (dual Finnish/US citizen by birth) – Troy Trojans, North Georgia
- Daniel Jansson – Lakeland University
- Mikael Jantunen – Utah Utes
- Mikko Koivisto – UNC Greensboro Spartans
- Tuukka Kotti – Providence Friars
- Gerald Lee (dual Finnish/US citizen by birth) – Old Dominion Monarchs
- Miro Little (dual Finnish/US citizen by birth – Baylor Bears, Utah Utes, UC Santa Barbara Gauchos
- Pekka Markkanen – Kansas Jayhawks
- Edon Maxhuni – Long Beach State Beach
- Michaela Moua – Ohio State Buckeyes
- Alex Murphy (dual Finnish/US citizen by birth) – Duke Blue Devils, Florida Gators, Northeastern Huskies
- Kimmo Muurinen – Arkansas–Little Rock Trojans
- Lassi Nikkarinen – Montana State Bobcats
- Antti Nikkilä – Valparaiso Crusaders
- Olivier Nkamhoua – Tennessee Volunteers, Michigan Wolverines
- Hannes Pöllä – Oklahoma Sooners, UT Martin Skyhawks
- Remu Raitanen – San Francisco Dons
- Timo Saarelainen – BYU Cougars
- Tiina Sten – St. John's Red Storm
- Teemu Suokas – Ball State Cardinals
- Joonas Suotamo – Penn State Nittany Lions
- Ville Tahvanainen – Bradley Braves
- Touko Tainamo – Denver Pioneers, Wyoming Cowboys
- Elias Valtonen – Arizona State Sun Devils
- Jamar Wilson (dual Finnish/US citizen) – Albany Great Danes

== France ==
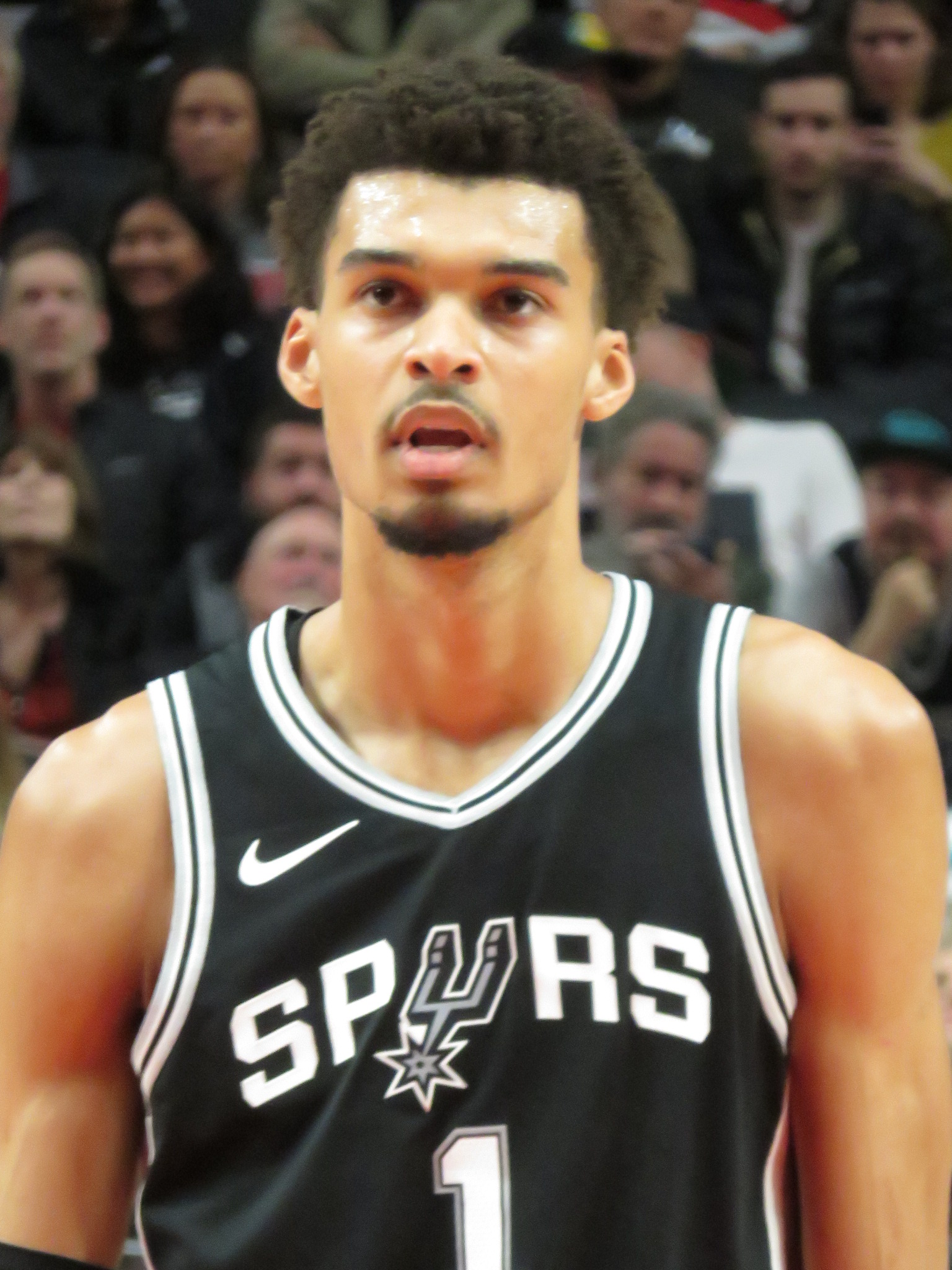
Victor Wembanyama with the San Antonio Spurs in 2024

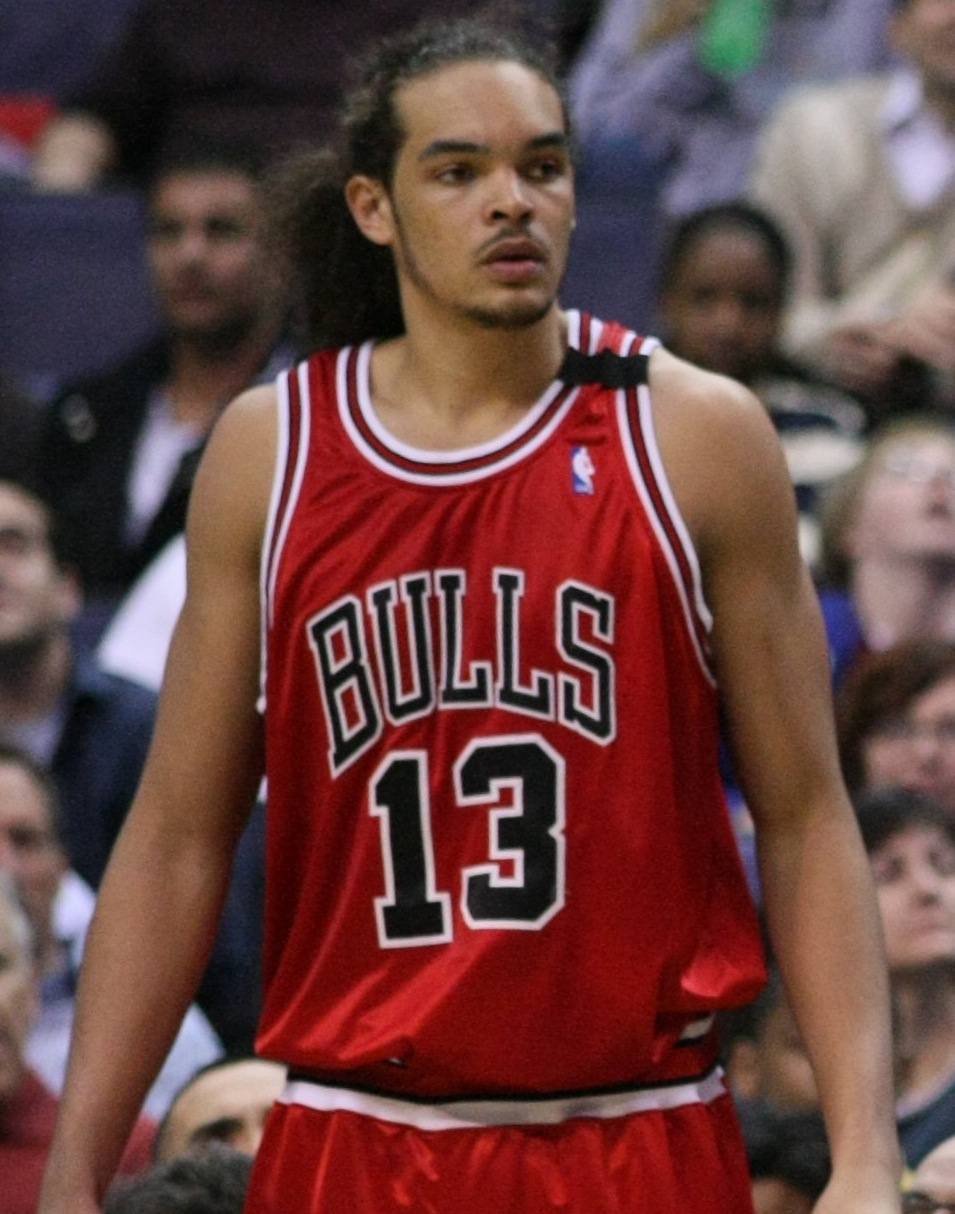
Joakim Noah with the Chicago Bulls in 2009

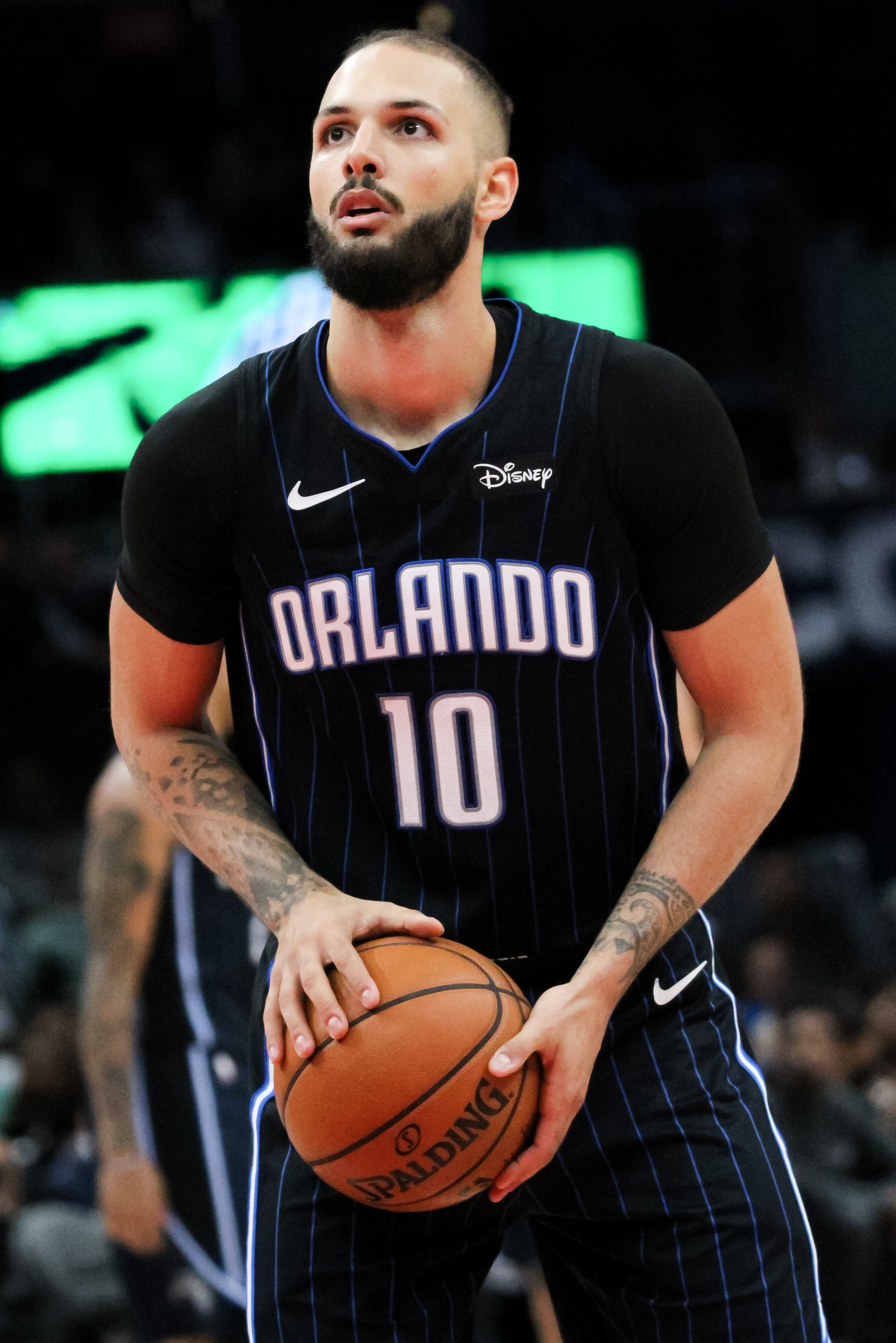
Evan Fournier with the Orlando Magic in 2019

=== NBA/WNBA ===
- Tariq Abdul-Wahad – Michigan Wolverines, San Jose State Spartans, and four NBA teams
- Alexis Ajinça – Four NBA teams
- Joël Ayayi – Gonzaga Bulldogs, Washington Wizards, Capital City Go-Go, Lakeland Magic
- Valériane Ayayi – San Antonio Stars
- Marième Badiane – Minnesota Lynx
- **Nicolas Batum** – Portland Trail Blazers, Charlotte Hornets, Los Angeles Clippers, Philadelphia 76ers
- **Joan Beringer** – Minnesota Timberwolves
- Lucienne Berthieu – Old Dominion Lady Monarchs, Cleveland Rockers, Houston Comets
- Rodrigue Beaubois – Dallas Mavericks
- Malcolm Cazalon – Detroit Pistons, Motor City Cruise
- **Sidy Cissoko** – NBA G League Ignite, San Antonio Spurs, Austin Spurs
- Petr Cornelie – Denver Nuggets
- **Bilal Coulibaly** – Washington Wizards
- **Pacôme Dadiet** – New York Knicks
- Nando de Colo – San Antonio Spurs, Toronto Raptors
- **Moussa Diabaté** – Michigan Wolverines, Los Angeles Clippers, Ontario Clippers
- Boris Diaw – Five NBA teams
- Yakhouba Diawara – Pepperdine Waves, Denver Nuggets, Miami Heat
- **Ousmane Dieng** – Oklahoma City Thunder, Oklahoma City Blue
- Sekou Doumbouya – Detroit Pistons, Los Angeles Lakers
- Céline Dumerc – Atlanta Dream
- Olivia Époupa – Minnesota Lynx
- **Noa Essengue** – Chicago Bulls
- Isabelle Fijalkowski – Colorado Buffaloes, Cleveland Rockers
- Evan Fournier – Denver Nuggets, Orlando Magic, Boston Celtics, New York Knicks
- Mickaël Gelabale – Seattle SuperSonics, Minnesota Timberwolves, and two D-League teams
- **Rudy Gobert** – Utah Jazz, Minnesota Timberwolves
- Émilie Gomis – New York Liberty
- Sandrine Gruda – Connecticut Sun, Los Angeles Sparks
- Killian Hayes – Detroit Pistons
- Jaylen Hoard – Wake Forest Demon Deacons, Portland Trail Blazers, Texas Legends, Oklahoma City Thunder, Oklahoma City Blue
- William Howard – Houston Rockets
- Damien Inglis – Milwaukee Bucks, Canton Charge, Westchester Knicks
- **Marine Johannès** – New York Liberty
- Joffrey Lauvergne – Denver Nuggets, Oklahoma City Thunder, Chicago Bulls, San Antonio Spurs
- Edwige Lawson-Wade – Four WNBA teams, most notably the San Antonio Silver Stars
- **Carla Leite** – Golden State Valkyries
- Timothé Luwawu-Cabarrot – Philadelphia 76ers, Delaware 87ers, Oklahoma City Thunder, Chicago Bulls, Brooklyn Nets, Long Island Nets, Atlanta Hawks
- Ian Mahinmi – San Antonio Spurs, Austin Toros, Dallas Mavericks, Indiana Pacers, Washington Wizards
- Théo Maledon – Oklahoma City Thunder, Oklahoma City Blue, Charlotte Hornets, Greensboro Swarm, Phoenix Suns
- **Dominique Malonga** – Seattle Storm
- Jérôme Moïso – UCLA Bruins and six NBA teams
- Adam Mokoka – Chicago Bulls
- Emmeline Ndongue – Los Angeles Sparks
- Joakim Noah (dual US/French citizen by birth) – Four NBA teams
- Frank Ntilikina – New York Knicks, Dallas Mavericks, Charlotte Hornets
- Élie Okobo – Phoenix Suns
- Sabrina Palie – Detroit Shock
- Tony Parker – San Antonio Spurs, Charlotte Hornets
- **Noah Penda** – Orlando Magic
- Johan Petro – Five NBA teams
- Mickaël Piétrus – Five NBA teams
- Vincent Poirier – Boston Celtics
- Yves Pons – Tennessee Volunteers, Memphis Grizzlies, Memphis Hustle
- **Maxime Raynaud** – Stanford Cardinal, Sacramento Kings
- Antoine Rigaudeau – Dallas Mavericks
- **Zaccharie Risacher** – Atlanta Hawks
- **Iliana Rupert** – Las Vegas Aces, Atlanta Dream, Golden State Valkyries
- **Rayan Rupert** – Portland Trail Blazers, Rip City Remix
- **Janelle Salaün** – Golden State Valkyries
- **Tidjane Salaün** – Charlotte Hornets
- **Alex Sarr** – Washington Wizards
- Olivier Sarr – Wake Forest Demon Deacons, Kentucky Wildcats, Oklahoma City Thunder, Oklahoma City Blue
- Audrey Sauret – Washington Mystics
- Laure Savasta – Washington Huskies, Sacramento Monarchs
- Kevin Séraphin – Washington Wizards, New York Knicks, Indiana Pacers
- Kadi Sissoko – Phoenix Mercury
- Pape Sy – Atlanta Hawks
- Killian Tillie – Gonzaga Bulldogs, Memphis Grizzlies, Memphis Hustle
- Axel Toupane – Denver Nuggets, Milwaukee Bucks, New Orleans Pelicans
- **Mamignan Touré** – Connecticut Sun
- Armel Traoré – Los Angeles Lakers
- **Nolan Traoré** – Brooklyn Nets
- Ronny Turiaf – Gonzaga Bulldogs and seven NBA teams
- **Victor Wembanyama** – San Antonio Spurs
- **Guerschon Yabusele** – Boston Celtics, ASVEL, Philadelphia 76ers

=== G League/College ===
- Frédéric Adjiwanou – Saint Mary's Gaels
- **Adama-Alpha Bal** – Santa Clara Broncos
- Mohamed Diarra – NC State Wolfpack
- Stéphane Dondon – Virginia Cavaliers
- Paoline Ékambi – Marist Red Foxes
- **Christ Essandoko** – Providence Friars, South Carolina Gamecocks
- **Ilane Fibleuil** – UCLA Bruins
- **Kymany Houinsou** – Loyola-Chicago Ramblers
- **Ilias Kamardine** – Ole Miss Rebels
- Terry Tarpey – William and Mary
- Kim Tillie – Utah Utes
- Will Yeguete (dual French/Central African Republic citizen by birth) – Florida Gators

== Georgia ==
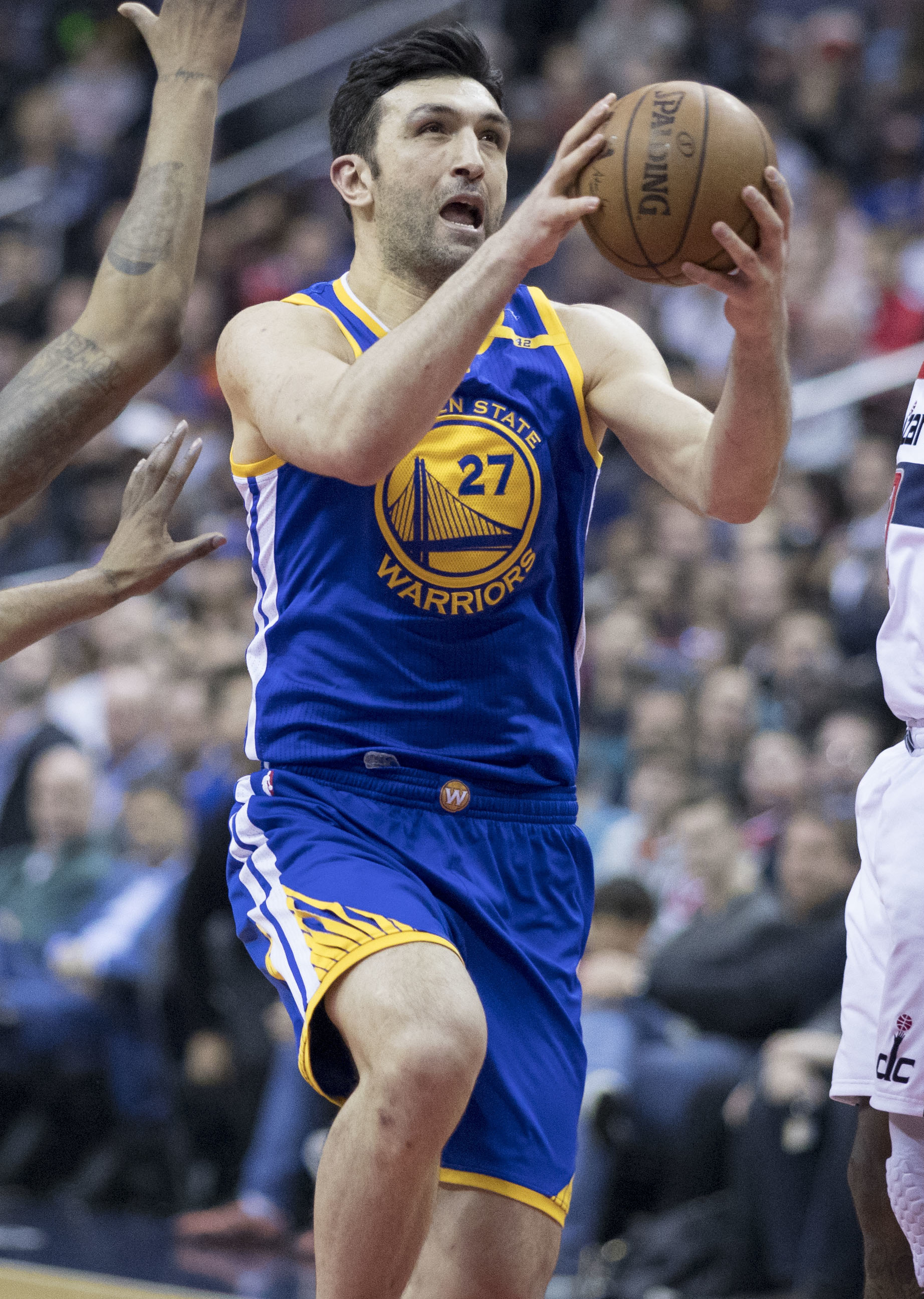
Zaza Pachulia with the Golden State Warriors in 2017

=== NBA/WNBA ===
- **Goga Bitadze** – Indiana Pacers, Fort Wayne Mad Ants, Orlando Magic
- **Sandro Mamukelashvili** (dual US/Georgian citizen by birth) – Seton Hall Pirates, Milwaukee Bucks, Wisconsin Herd, San Antonio Spurs
- Zaza Pachulia – Orlando Magic, Milwaukee Bucks, Atlanta Hawks, Dallas Mavericks, Golden State Warriors, Detroit Pistons
- Tornike Shengelia – Brooklyn Nets, Chicago Bulls
- Vladimir Stepania – Four NBA teams
- Nikoloz Tskitishvili – Denver Nuggets, Golden State Warriors, Minnesota Timberwolves, Phoenix Suns

=== G League/College ===
- Rati Andronikashvili – Creighton Bluejays
- Giorgi Bezhanishvili (dual Georgian/Austrian citizen) – Illinois Fighting Illini, Grand Rapids Gold, College Park Skyhawks, Iowa Wolves
- Saba Gigiberia – Georgia Tech Yellow Jackets, San Francisco Dons
- Willy Isiani – Detroit Mercy Titans
- Aleksandre Merkviladze – Cal State Northridge Matadors, Loyola Marymount Lions
- Nikoloz Metskhvarishvili – Louisiana–Monroe Warhawks
- Duda Sanadze – San Diego Toreros
- Tsotne Tsartsidze – North Dakota Fighting Hawks
- Zurab Zhgenti – Northwestern State Demons

== Germany ==
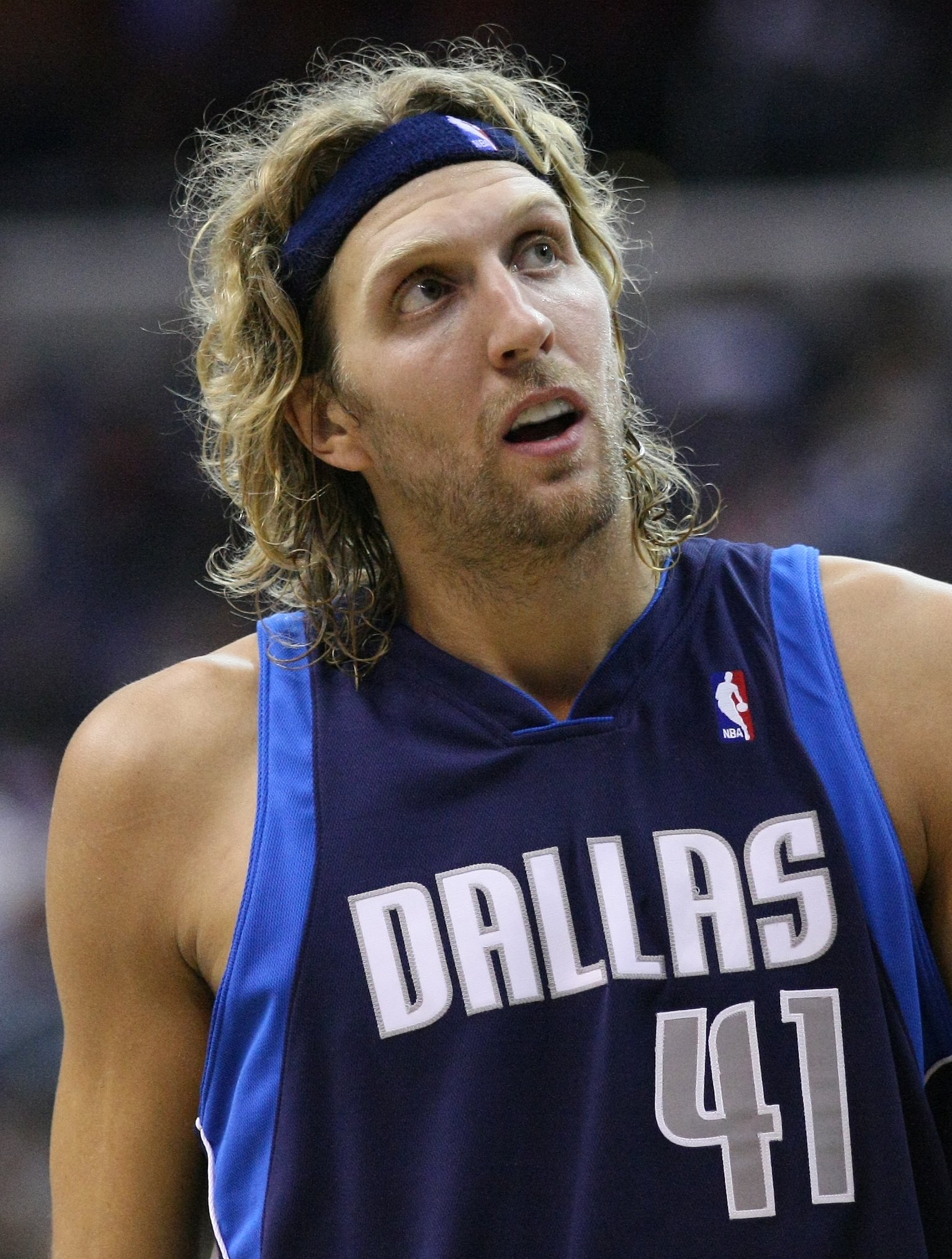
Dirk Nowitzki with the Dallas Mavericks in 2009

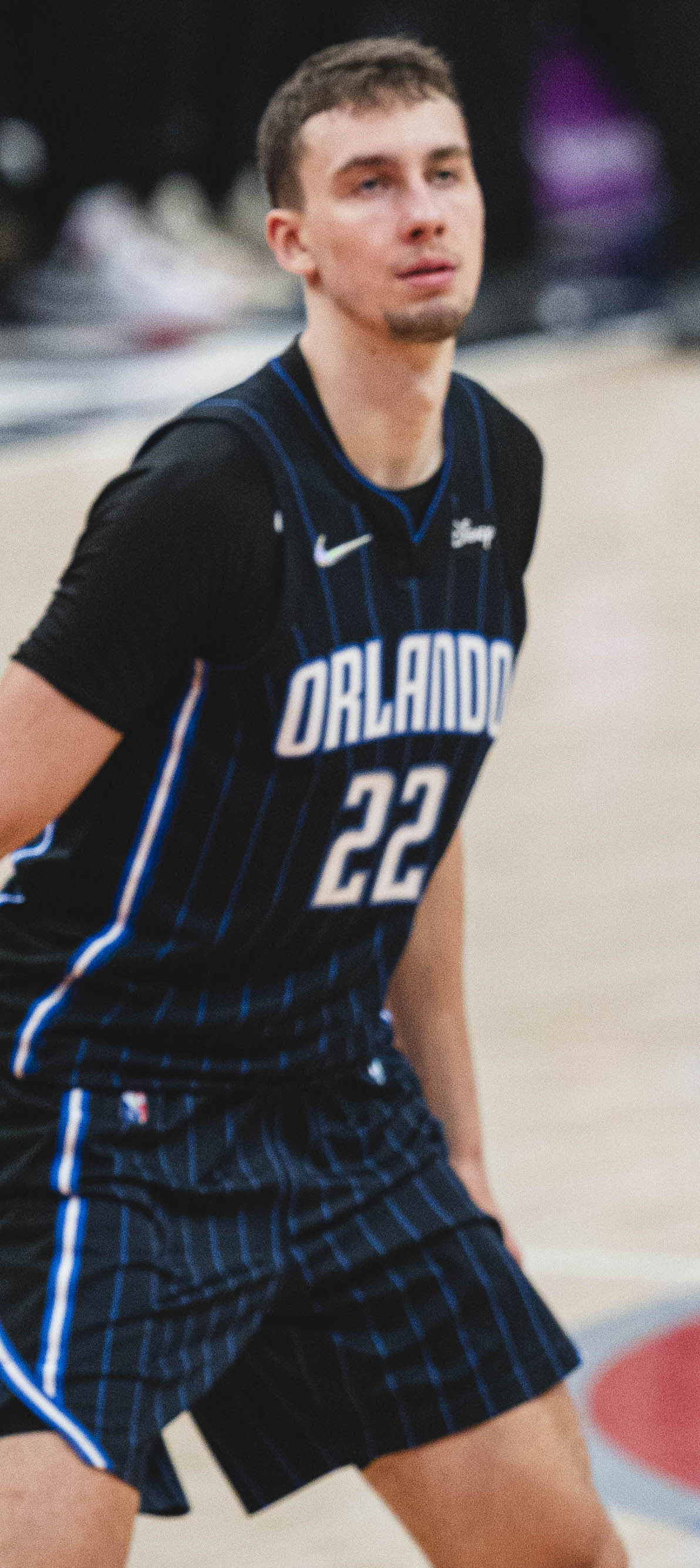
Franz Wagner with the Orlando Magic in 2022

=== NBA/WNBA ===
- Marlies Askamp – Three WNBA teams
- Uwe Blab – Indiana Hoosiers and three NBA teams
- Isaac Bonga – Los Angeles Lakers, South Bay Lakers, Washington Wizards, Toronto Raptors, Raptors 905
- Shawn Bradley (dual German/US citizen)– Dallas Mavericks
- **Tristan da Silva** (dual German/Brazilian citizen) – Colorado Buffaloes, Orlando Magic
- **Leonie Fiebich** – New York Liberty
- Frido Frey (naturalized in the US) – LIU Brooklyn Blackbirds (then simply LIU), New York Knicks
- Linda Fröhlich – UNLV Rebels and four WNBA teams
- **Luisa Gieselsöder** – Dallas Wings
- Marie Gülich – Phoenix Mercury, Atlanta Dream, Las Vegas Aces
- Elias Harris – Gonzaga Bulldogs, Los Angeles Lakers, Los Angeles D-Fenders
- **Isaiah Hartenstein** – Rio Grande Valley Vipers, Houston Rockets, Denver Nuggets, Cleveland Cavaliers, Los Angeles Clippers, New York Knicks, Oklahoma City Thunder
- Charlie Hoefer – Boston Celtics
- **Ariel Hukporti** – New York Knicks, Westchester Knicks
- Chris Kaman (dual German/US citizen) – Five NBA teams
- **Maxi Kleber** – Dallas Mavericks
- Dirk Nowitzki – Dallas Mavericks
- Tim Ohlbrecht – Houston Rockets and two D-League teams
- Tibor Pleiß – Utah Jazz
- **Nyara Sabally** (US and Gambian citizen by birth) – New York Liberty
- **Satou Sabally** (US and Gambian citizen by birth) – Oregon Ducks, Dallas Wings
- Detlef Schrempf – Washington Huskies and four NBA teams
- **Dennis Schröder** – Atlanta Hawks, Bakersfield Jam, Oklahoma City Thunder, Los Angeles Lakers, Boston Celtics, Houston Rockets, Toronto Raptors, Brooklyn Nets
- Daniel Theis – Boston Celtics, Chicago Bulls, Houston Rockets, Indiana Pacers, Los Angeles Clippers
- **Franz Wagner** – Michigan Wolverines, Orlando Magic
- **Moritz Wagner** – Michigan Wolverines, Los Angeles Lakers, South Bay Lakers, Washington Wizards, Boston Celtics, Orlando Magic
- Duane Washington Jr. (dual German/US citizen by birth) – Ohio State Buckeyes, Indiana Pacers, Fort Wayne Mad Ants, Phoenix Suns, Westchester Knicks
- Martina Weber – New York Liberty
- Chris Welp – Washington Huskies and three NBA teams
- Paul Zipser – Chicago Bulls

=== G League/College ===
- Patrick Femerling – Washington Huskies
- Richard Fröhlich – UTSA Roadrunners
- Niels Giffey – Connecticut Huskies
- Johannes Herber – West Virginia Mountaineers
- Yassin Idbihi – Buffalo Bulls
- Jan Jagla – Penn State Nittany Lions
- Alexander Kühl – Charlotte 49ers (then branded as UNC Charlotte)
- Jens Kujawa – Illinois Fighting Illini
- Maodo Lô – Columbia Lions
- Ademola Okulaja – North Carolina Tar Heels
- Henrik Rödl – North Carolina Tar Heels
- Christian Schmidt – Buffalo Bulls
- Benny Schröder – Oklahoma Sooners, George Washington Revolutionaries
- Martin Seiferth – Oregon Ducks, Eastern Washington Eagles
- Christian Sengfelder – Fordham Rams, Boise State Broncos
- Lucca Staiger – Iowa State Cyclones
- Torsten Stein – Fairleigh Dickinson Knights

== Greece ==
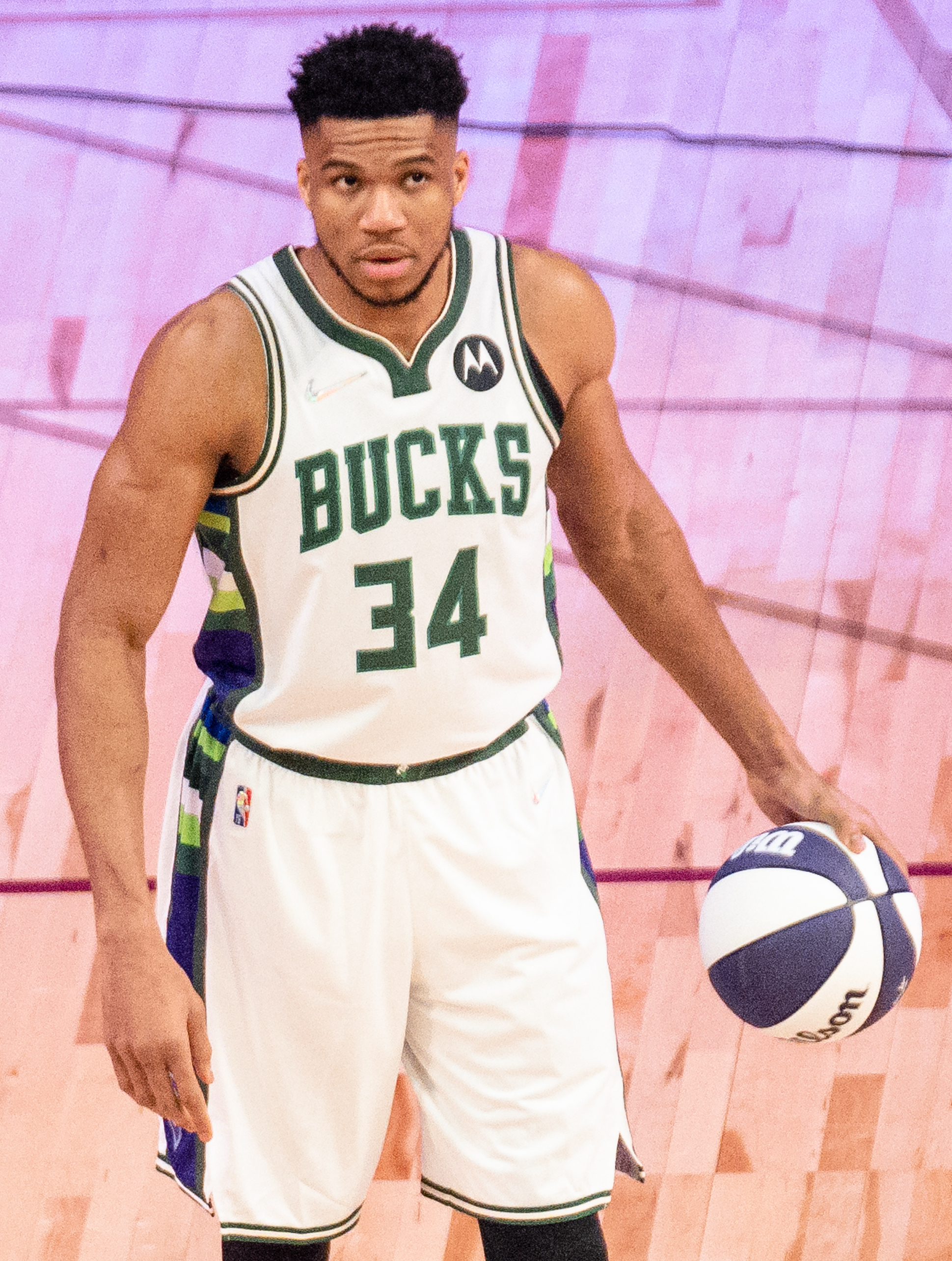
Giannis Antetokounmpo with the Milwaukee Bucks in 2022

=== NBA/WNBA ===
- **Giannis Antetokounmpo** – Milwaukee Bucks
- Kostas Antetokounmpo – Dayton Flyers, Dallas Mavericks, Texas Legends, Los Angeles Lakers, South Bay Lakers, Windy City Bulls
- **Thanasis Antetokounmpo** – Delaware 87ers, Westchester Knicks, New York Knicks, Milwaukee Bucks, Wisconsin Herd
- Nick Calathes (dual US/Greek citizen by birth) – Florida Gators, Memphis Grizzlies
- Zoi Dimitrakou – Washington Mystics
- Tyler Dorsey (dual US/Greek citizen by birth) – Oregon Ducks, Atlanta Hawks, Erie BayHawks, Memphis Grizzlies, Memphis Hustle, Dallas Mavericks, Texas Legends
- Antonis Fotsis – Memphis Grizzlies
- Jacki Gemelos (dual US/Greek citizen) – Chicago Sky, Connecticut Sun, Washington Mystics
- Andreas Glyniadakis – Seattle SuperSonics and two D-League teams
- Georgios Kalaitzakis – Milwaukee Bucks
- Anastasia Kostaki – Houston Comets
- Kosta Koufos (dual US/Greek citizen by birth) – Ohio State Buckeyes, Utah Jazz, Utah Flash, Minnesota Timberwolves, Denver Nuggets, Memphis Grizzlies, Sacramento Kings, NBA G League Ignite
- Evanthia Maltsi – Connecticut Sun
- Naz Mitrou-Long (dual Canadian/Greek citizen by birth) – Utah Jazz, Indiana Pacers
- Georgios Papagiannis – Sacramento Kings
- Kostas Papanikolaou – Denver Nuggets, Houston Rockets
- Efthimios Rentzias – Philadelphia 76ers
- Vassilis Spanoulis – Houston Rockets
- Jake Tsakalidis (born in Republic of Georgia) – Phoenix Suns and two NBA teams

=== G League/College ===
- Alex Antetokounmpo – Raptors 905, Wisconsin Herd
- Zach Auguste (dual US/Greek citizen by birth) – Notre Dame Fighting Irish
- Pat Calathes (dual US/Greek citizen by birth) – Saint Joseph's Hawks
- Nikolaos Chitikoudis – North Carolina A&T Aggies
- Panagiotis Fasoulas – NC State Wolfpack
- Nikos Galis (dual US/Greek citizen by birth) – Seton Hall Pirates
- Paris Maragkos – George Washington Colonials, American Eagles
- Ioannis Papapetrou – Texas Longhorns
- Nick Paulos (dual US/Greek citizen by birth) – UNC Greensboro Spartans
- Ismini Prapa – Pittsburgh Panthers
- Artemis Spanou – Robert Morris Colonials
- **Andrej Stojaković** (also a Serbian citizen by birth) – Stanford Cardinal
- Georgios Tsalmpouris – Iowa State Cyclones
- Georgios Trontzos – Gonzaga Bulldogs

== Hungary ==
=== NBA/WNBA ===
- Kornél Dávid – Four NBA teams, most notably with the Chicago Bulls
- Bernadett Határ – Indiana Fever, Connecticut Sun, Washington Mystics
- Dalma Ivanyi – Utah Starzz, Phoenix Mercury, San Antonio Silver Stars
- Dorka Juhász – Minnesota Lynx
- Andrea Nagy – FIU Panthers (then Golden Panthers) and three WNBA teams
- Petra Ujhelyi – Detroit Shock

=== G League/College ===
- György Golomán – UCLA Bruins, Westchester Knicks

== Iceland ==
=== NBA/WNBA ===
- Pétur Guðmundsson – Washington Huskies, three NBA teams, and five teams in the CBA and USBL

=== G League/College ===
- Dagný Lísa Davíðsdóttir – Wyoming Cowgirls, Niagara Purple Eagles
- Dagur Kár Jónsson – St. Francis Brooklyn Terriers
- Elín Sóley Hrafnkelsdóttir – Tulsa Golden Hurricane
- Elvar Már Friðriksson – LIU Brooklyn Blackbirds
- Fannar Ólafsson – South Carolina Gamecocks
- Flosi Sigurðsson – Washington Huskies
- Gunnar Ólafsson – St. Francis Brooklyn Terriers
- Hakon Hjalmarsson – Binghamton Bearcats
- Haukur Pálsson – Maryland Terrapins
- Helena Sverrisdóttir – TCU Horned Frogs
- Hildur Björg Kjartansdóttir – Texas–Rio Grande Valley Vaqueros
- Ingvi Þór Guðmundsson – Saint Louis Billikens
- Jón Axel Guðmundsson – Davidson Wildcats
- Kári Jónsson – Drexel Dragons
- Kristinn Pálsson – Marist Red Foxes
- Martin Hermannsson – LIU Brooklyn Blackbirds
- Sara Rún Hinriksdóttir – Canisius Golden Griffins
- Sigrún Björg Ólafsdóttir – Chattanooga Mocs
- Styrmir Snær Þrastarson – Davidson Wildcats
- Thelma Dís Ágústsdóttir – Ball State Cardinals
- Þórir Þorbjarnarson – Nebraska Cornhuskers

== Ireland ==
=== NBA/WNBA ===
- Pat Burke (dual Irish/US citizen) – Auburn Tigers, Orlando Magic, Phoenix Suns

=== G League/College ===
- CJ Fulton – Lafayette Leopards, Charleston Cougars
- Aidan Igiehon – Louisville Cardinals
- Jason Killeen – Winthrop Eagles
- Eoin Nelson – Wyoming Cowboys

== Israel ==
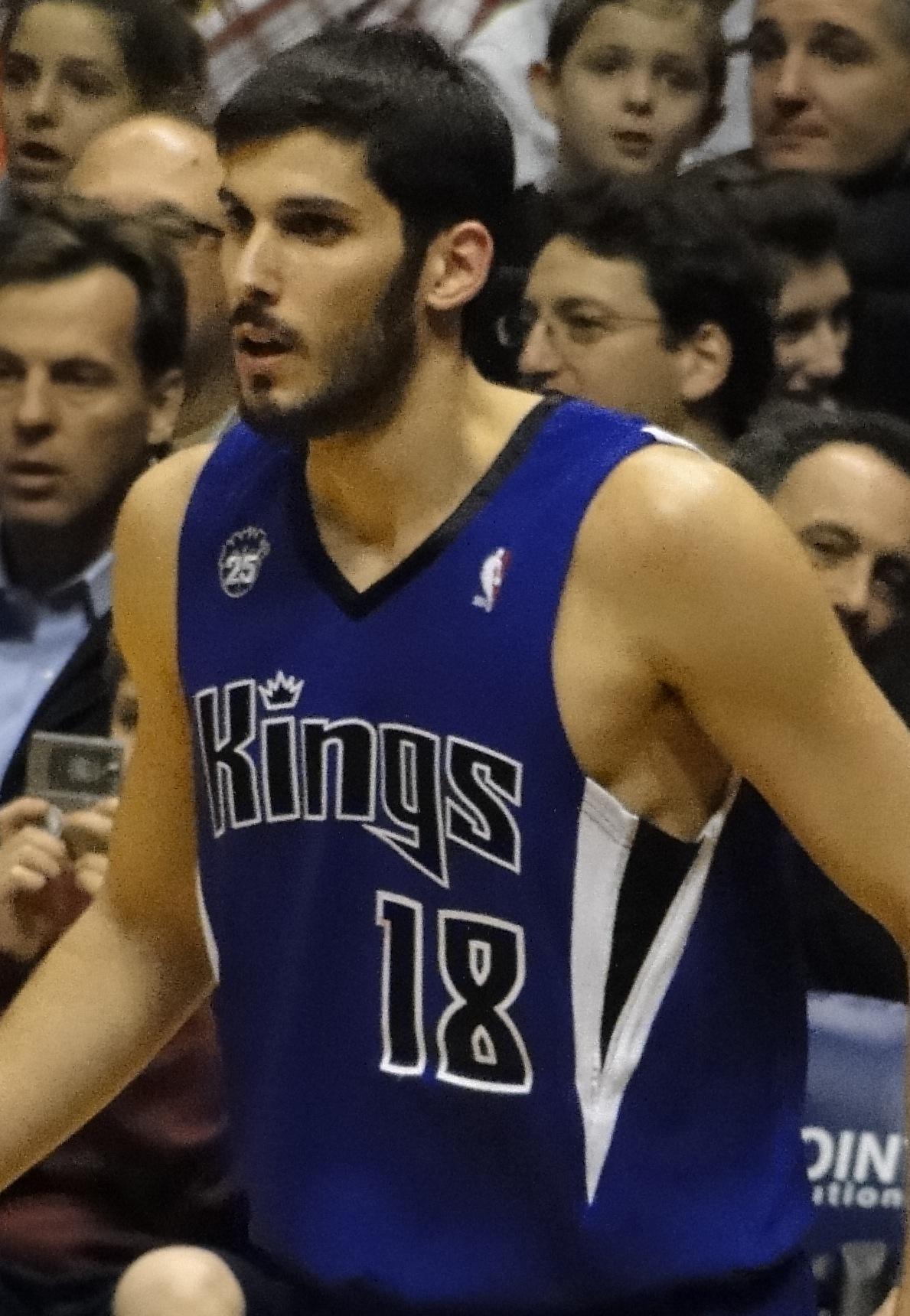
Omri Casspi with the Sacramento Kings in 2009

=== NBA/WNBA ===
- **Deni Avdija** – Washington Wizards, Portland Trail Blazers
- Omri Casspi – Memphis Grizzlies, Sacramento Kings
- Shay Doron – Maryland Terrapins, New York Liberty
- T. J. Leaf – UCLA Bruins, Indiana Pacers, Fort Wayne Mad Ants, Portland Trail Blazers
- Gal Mekel – Wichita State Shockers, Dallas Mavericks
- **Ben Saraf** – Brooklyn Nets
- **Danny Wolf** – Yale Bulldogs, Michigan Wolverines, Brooklyn Nets

=== G League/College ===
- Nadav Henefeld – Connecticut Huskies
- Karam Mashour – Morehead State Eagles, UNLV Runnin' Rebels
- **Omer Mayer** – Purdue Boilermakers
- Izik Ohanon – Saint Louis Billikens
- **Emanuel Sharp** – Houston Cougars
- Doron Sheffer – Connecticut Huskies
- Amit Tamir – Cal Golden Bears
- Nimrod Tishman – Florida Gators

== Italy ==
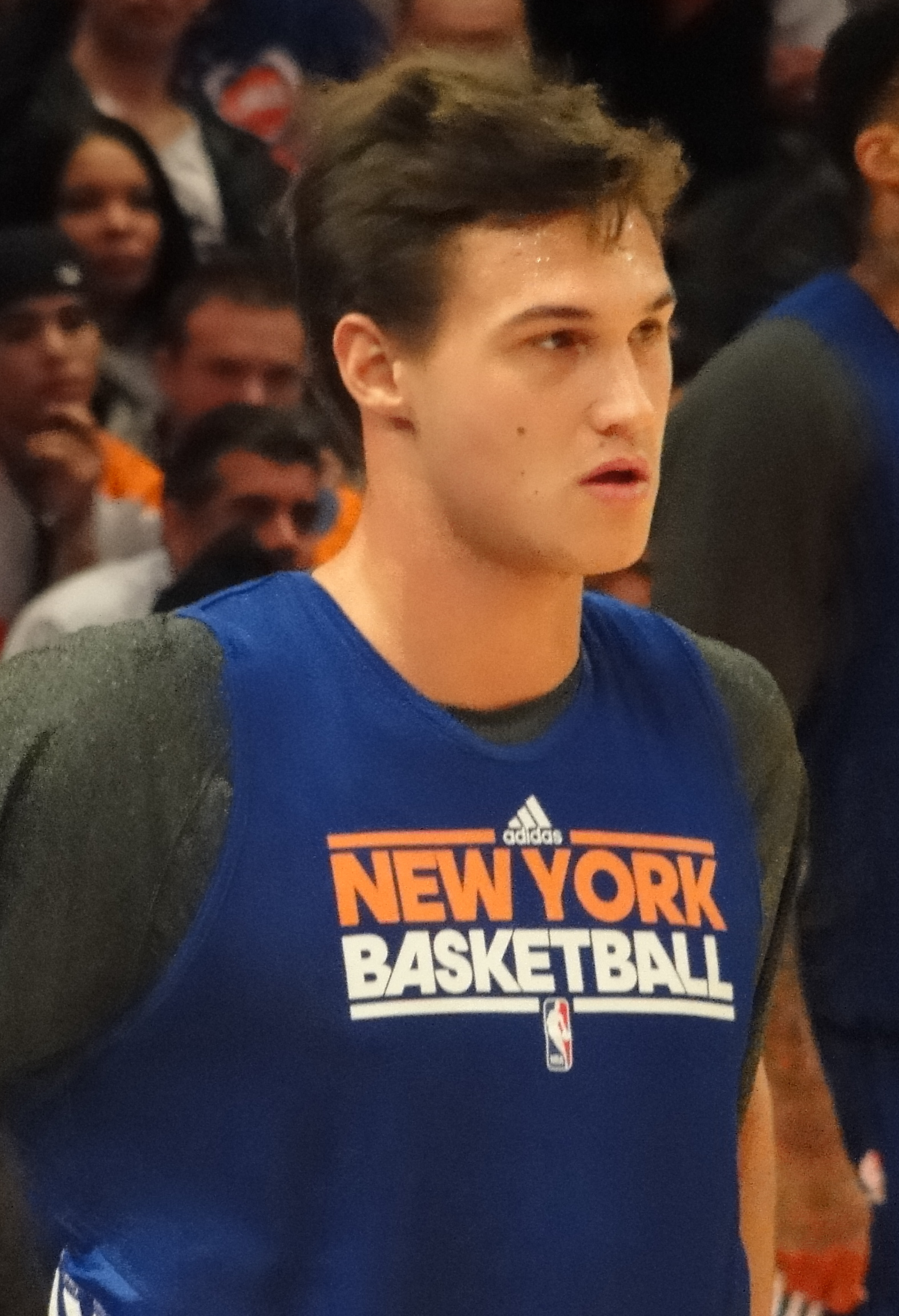
Danilo Gallinari with the New York Knicks in 2010

=== NBA/WNBA ===
- Ryan Arcidiacono (dual US/Italian citizen by birth) – Villanova Wildcats, Austin Spurs, Chicago Bulls, Windy City Bulls, Maine Celtics, New York Knicks, Portland Trail Blazers
- **Paolo Banchero** (dual US/Italian citizen) – Duke Blue Devils, Orlando Magic
- Andrea Bargnani – Toronto Raptors, New York Knicks, Brooklyn Nets
- Marco Belinelli – Eight NBA teams, he won an NBA title with San Antonio Spurs.
- Susanna Bonfiglio – Phoenix Mercury
- Lorela Cubaj – New York Liberty, Atlanta Dream
- Mike D'Antoni (dual US/Italian citizen by birth) – Marshall Thundering Herd and three teams in the NBA and ABA
- Luigi Datome – Detroit Pistons, Boston Celtics
- Vincenzo Esposito – Toronto Raptors
- **Simone Fontecchio** – Utah Jazz, Detroit Pistons
- Danilo Gallinari – New York Knicks, Denver Nuggets, Los Angeles Clippers, Oklahoma City Thunder, Atlanta Hawks, Washington Wizards, Detroit Pistons
- Laura Macchi – Los Angeles Sparks
- Nico Mannion – Golden State Warriors
- Raffaella Masciadri – Los Angeles Sparks
- Nicolò Melli – Dallas Mavericks, New Orleans Pelicans
- Catarina Pollini – Houston Comets
- Kathrin Ress – Boston College Eagles, Minnesota Lynx
- Stefano Rusconi – Phoenix Suns
- **Cecilia Zandalasini** – Minnesota Lynx
- Francesca Zara – Seattle Storm

=== G League/College ===
- Nicola Akele – Rhode Island Rams
- Amedeo Della Valle – Ohio State Buckeyes
- Daniel Hackett – USC Trojans
- Alessandro Lever – Grand Canyon Antelopes
- Davide Moretti – Texas Tech Red Raiders
- Federico Mussini – St. John's Red Storm
- Tomas Woldetensae – University of Virginia

== Kosovo ==
=== G League/College ===
- Dardan Kapiti – Florida Atlantic and Eastern Kentucky

== Latvia ==
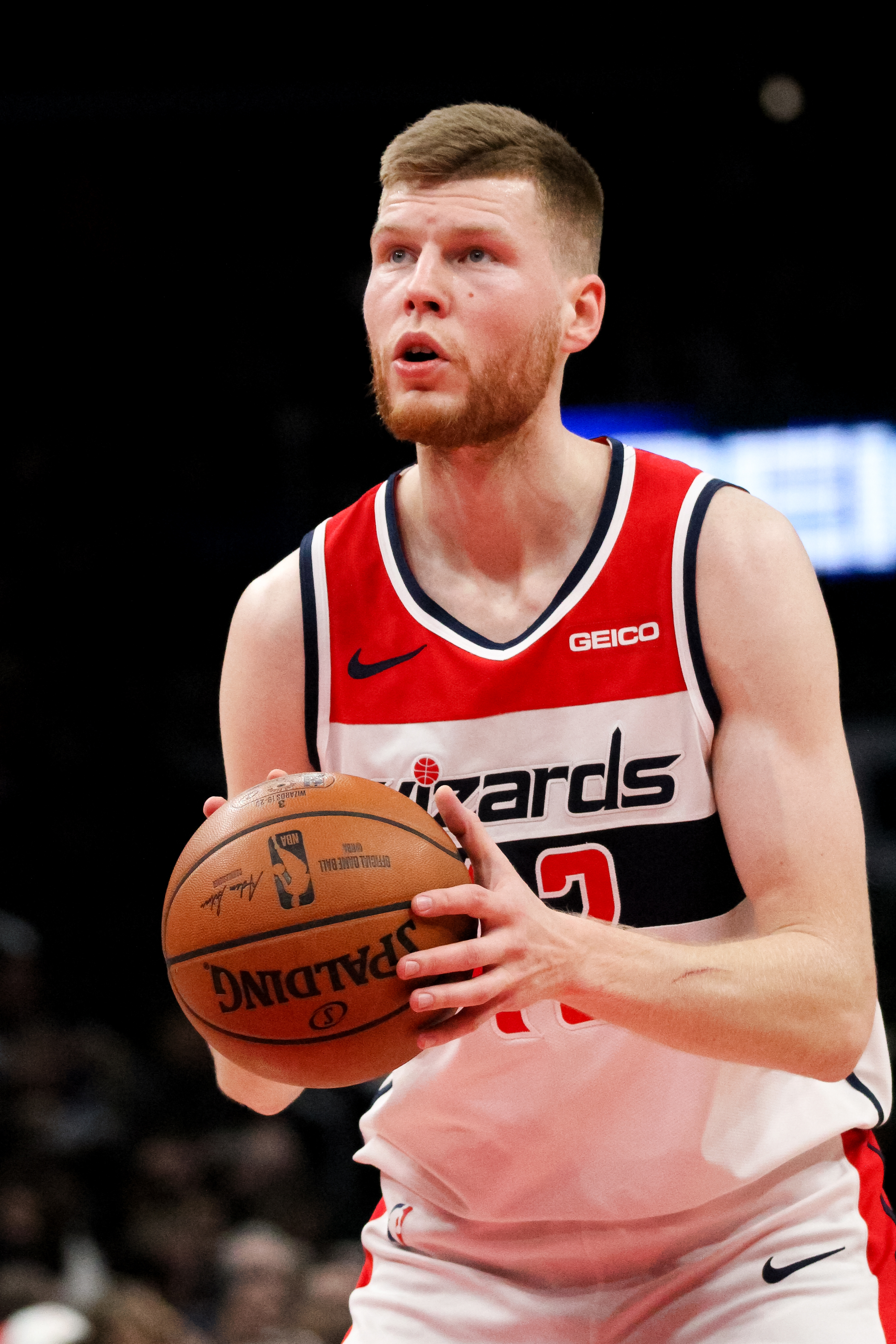
Dāvis Bertāns with the Washington Wizards in 2019

=== NBA/WNBA ===
- Dairis Bertāns – New Orleans Pelicans
- Dāvis Bertāns – San Antonio Spurs, Austin Spurs, Washington Wizards, Dallas Mavericks, Oklahoma City Thunder
- Andris Biedriņš – Golden State Warriors, Utah Jazz
- Anete Jēkabsone-Žogota – Connecticut Sun, Phoenix Mercury
- Rodions Kurucs – Brooklyn Nets, Long Island Nets, Houston Rockets, Milwaukee Bucks
- **Kitija Laksa** – Phoenix Mercury
- Anžejs Pasečņiks – Washington Wizards, Milwaukee Bucks, Wisconsin Herd
- **Kristaps Porziņģis** – New York Knicks, Dallas Mavericks, Washington Wizards, Boston Celtics
- Zane Tamane – Washington Mystics, Phoenix Mercury
- Gundars Vētra – Minnesota Timberwolves

=== G League/College ===
- Gunta Baško – Siena Saints
- Liene Jansone – Siena Saints
- Kaspars Kambala – UNLV Runnin' Rebels
- Haralds Kārlis – Seton Hall Pirates
- Ieva Kubliņa – Virginia Tech Hokies
- Rihards Kuksiks – Arizona State Sun Devils
- Raimonds Miglinieks – UC Irvine Anteaters
- Aija Putniņa – Colorado Buffaloes
- Artūrs Štālbergs – Evansville Purple Aces
- Zane Tamane – Western Illinois Leathernecks
  - During her time at Western Illinois, only men's teams were known as Leathernecks; women's teams were Westerwinds.
- Ričmonds Vilde – SMU Mustangs, Houston Baptist Huskies

== Lithuania ==
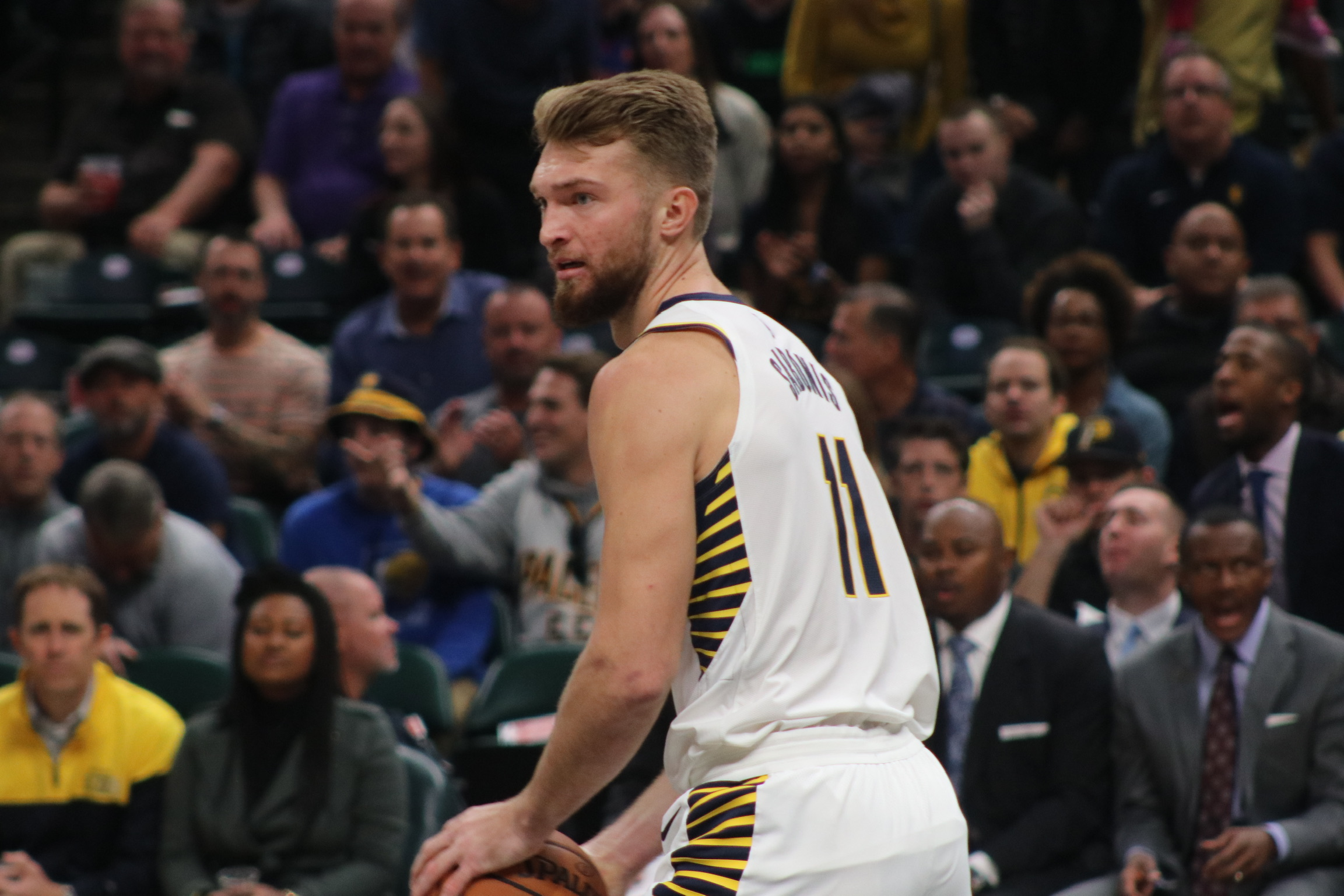
Domantas Sabonis with the Indiana Pacers in 2019

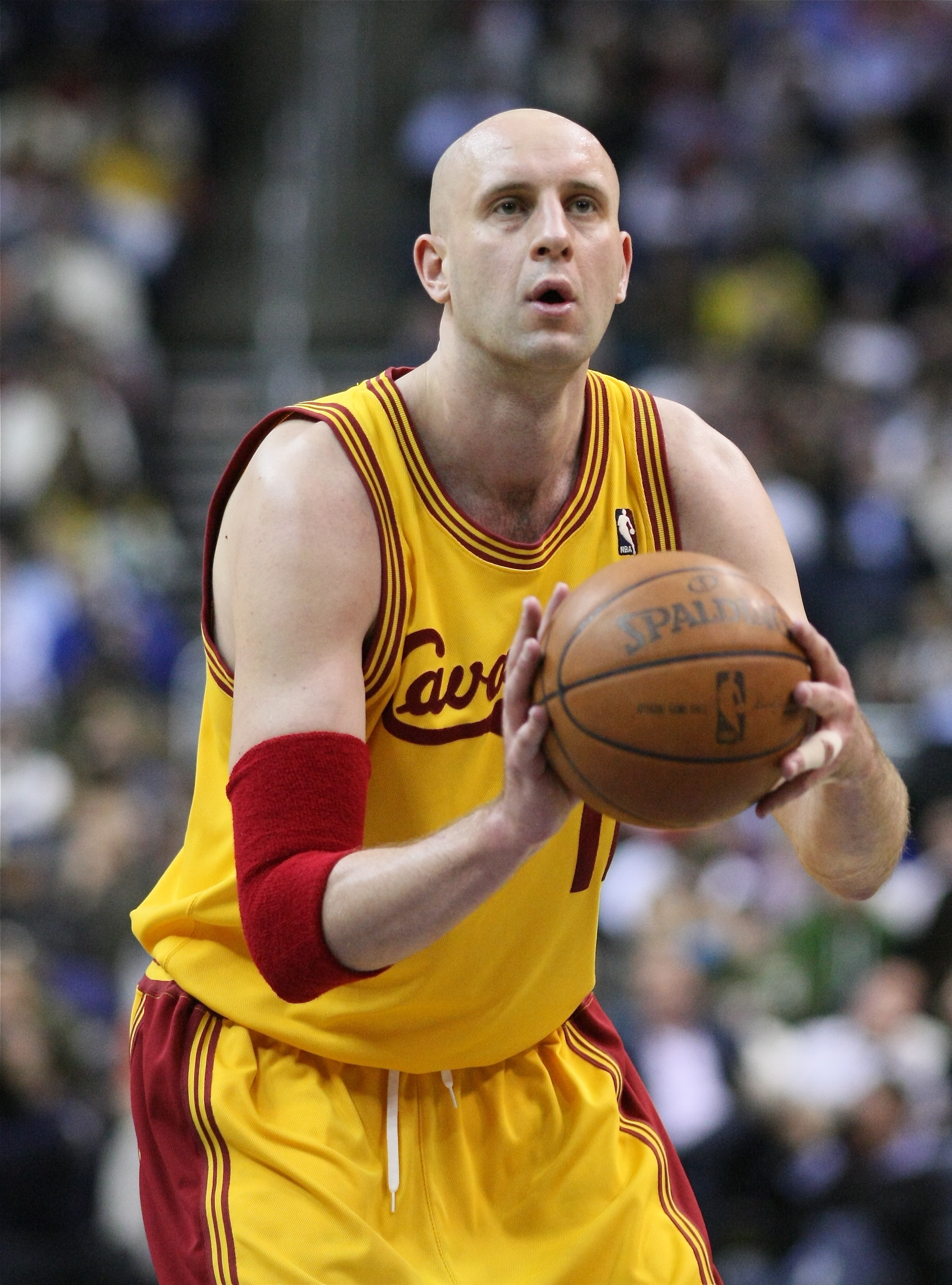
Žydrūnas Ilgauskas with the Cleveland Cavaliers in 2009

=== NBA/WNBA ===
- Martynas Andriuškevičius – Cleveland Cavaliers
- Ignas Brazdeikis (raised in Canada) – Michigan Wolverines, New York Knicks, Westchester Knicks, Philadelphia 76ers, Orlando Magic, Lakeland Magic
- **Matas Buzelis** – Chicago Bulls
- Žydrūnas Ilgauskas – Cleveland Cavaliers, Miami Heat
- **Kasparas Jakučionis** – Illinois Fighting Illini, Miami Heat
- Šarūnas Jasikevičius – Maryland Terrapins, Indiana Pacers, Golden State Warriors
- Aneta Kaušaitė – Detroit Shock
- Linas Kleiza – Missouri Tigers, Denver Nuggets, Toronto Raptors
- Arnoldas Kulboka – Charlotte Hornets
- Mindaugas Kuzminskas – New York Knicks
- Arvydas Macijauskas – New Orleans/Oklahoma City Hornets
- Šarūnas Marčiulionis – Golden State Warriors, Seattle SuperSonics, Sacramento Kings, Denver Nuggets
- Donatas Motiejūnas – Houston Rockets, New Orleans Pelicans, San Antonio Spurs
- Arvydas Sabonis – Portland Trail Blazers
- **Domantas Sabonis** (Lithuanian citizen by birth) – Gonzaga Bulldogs, Oklahoma City Thunder, Indiana Pacers, Sacramento Kings
- Deividas Sirvydis – Detroit Pistons, Motor City Cruise, Fort Wayne Mad Ants, Wisconsin Herd
- Darius Songaila – Wake Forest Demon Deacons and five NBA teams
- Jurgita Štreimikytė – Indiana Fever
- **Jonas Valančiūnas** – Toronto Raptors, Memphis Grizzlies, New Orleans Pelicans

=== G League/College ===
- Martynas Arlauskas – Gonzaga Bulldogs
- Deividas Dulkys – Florida State Seminoles
- Arvydas Eitutavičius – American Eagles
- Rapolas Ivanauskas – Northwestern Wildcats, Colgate Raiders, Cincinnati Bearcats
- Robertas Javtokas – Arizona Wildcats
- Evaldas Jocys – East Carolina Pirates
- Andrius Jurkūnas – Clemson Tigers
- Mindaugas Kacinas – South Carolina Gamecocks
- Artūras Karnišovas – Seton Hall Pirates
- Rimantas Kaukėnas – Seton Hall Pirates
- Antanas Kavaliauskas – Texas A&M Aggies
- **Motiejus Krivas** – Arizona Wildcats
- Saulius Kuzminskas – California Golden Bears
- Gabrielius Maldūnas – Dartmouth Big Green
- **Augustas Marčiulionis** – Saint Mary's Gaels
- Kęstutis Marčiulionis – Delaware Fightin' Blue Hens
- Laurynas Mikalauskas – Virginia Cavaliers
- Egidijus Mockevičius – Evansville Purple Aces, Long Island Nets
- Tomas Nagys – Clemson Tigers
- Marijonas Petravičius – South Carolina Gamecocks
- Karolis Petrukonis – Clemson Tigers
- Martynas Pocius – Duke Blue Devils
- Ąžuolas Tubelis – Arizona Wildcats
- Tautvilas Tubelis – Arizona Wildcats
- Donatas Zavackas – Pittsburgh Panthers

== Luxembourg ==
=== NBA/WNBA ===
- Alvin Jones – Philadelphia 76ers

== Montenegro ==
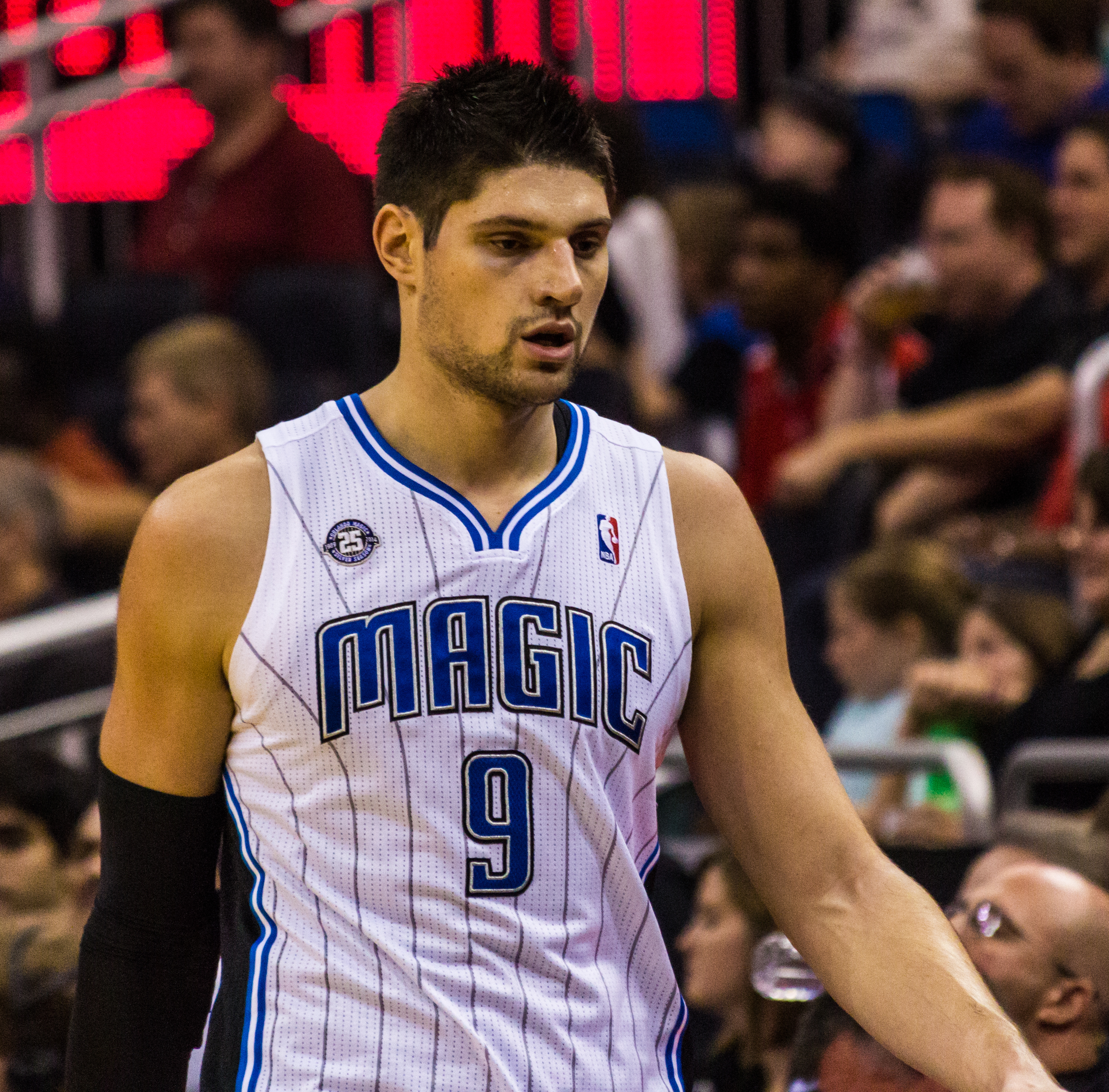
Nikola Vučević with the Orlando Magic in 2013

=== NBA/WNBA ===
- Žarko Čabarkapa – Phoenix Suns, Golden State Warriors
- Predrag Drobnjak – Three NBA teams
- Jelena Dubljević – Los Angeles Sparks
- Sasha Pavlović – Seven NBA teams
- Nikola Peković – Minnesota Timberwolves
- Hajdana Radunović – New York Liberty
- Predrag Savović – UAB Blazers, Hawaii Rainbow Warriors, and Denver Nuggets
- Marko Simonović – Chicago Bulls
- Slavko Vraneš – Portland Trail Blazers
- **Nikola Vučević** (born in Switzerland, raised in Belgium) – USC Trojans, Philadelphia 76ers, Orlando Magic, Chicago Bulls

=== G League/College ===
- Žarko Đurišić – Wichita State Shockers
- Luka Pavićević – Utah Utes
- **Fedor Žugić** – Creighton Bluejays

== Netherlands ==
=== NBA/WNBA ===
- Jesse Edwards – Minnesota Timberwolves, Iowa Wolves
- Francisco Elson – California Golden Bears and six NBA teams
- Dan Gadzuric – UCLA Bruins and four NBA teams
- Geert Hammink – LSU Tigers and two NBA teams
- Malevy Leons – Bradley Braves, Oklahoma City Thunder
- Swen Nater – UCLA Bruins and six teams in the ABA and NBA
- Marlous Nieuwveen – Los Angeles Sparks
- **Quinten Post** – Golden State Warriors
- Rik Smits – Marist Red Foxes, Indiana Pacers
- Sandra Van Embricqs – Los Angeles Sparks

=== G League/College ===
- Henry Bekkering (dual Canadian/Dutch citizen by birth) – Eastern Washington Eagles
- Kevin Bleeker – Canisius Golden Griffins
- Matt Haarms – Purdue Boilermakers, BYU Cougars
- Charlon Kloof (born in Suriname) – St. Bonaventure Bonnies
- Robert Krabbendam – Virginia Tech Hokies
- **Rienk Mast** – Nebraska Cornhuskers
- Roeland Schaftenaar – Oregon State Beavers
- Lucas Steijn – Idaho State Bengals
- Luuk van Bree – Bradley Braves
- Thomas van der Mars – Portland Pilots
- Kenneth van Kempen – Ohio Bobcats
- Peter van Noord – Fresno State Bulldogs
- Peter van Paassen – St. Bonaventure Bonnies
- Kevin van Wijk – Valparaiso Crusaders
- Kenrick Zondervan – UCF Knights
- Serge Zwikker – North Carolina Tar Heels

== North Macedonia ==
=== NBA/WNBA ===
- Pero Antić – Atlanta Hawks

=== G League/College ===
- **Andrej Jakimovski** – Washington State Cougars

== Norway ==
=== NBA/WNBA ===
- Torgeir Bryn – Texas State Bobcats (then Southwest Texas State), Los Angeles Clippers and several minor-league teams

=== G League/College ===
- Harald Frey – Montana State Bobcats
- Karamo Jawara – North Carolina Central Eagles
- Terrence Oglesby (dual Norwegian/US citizen by birth) – Clemson Tigers
- Torgrim Sommerfeldt – Manhattan Jaspers

== Poland ==
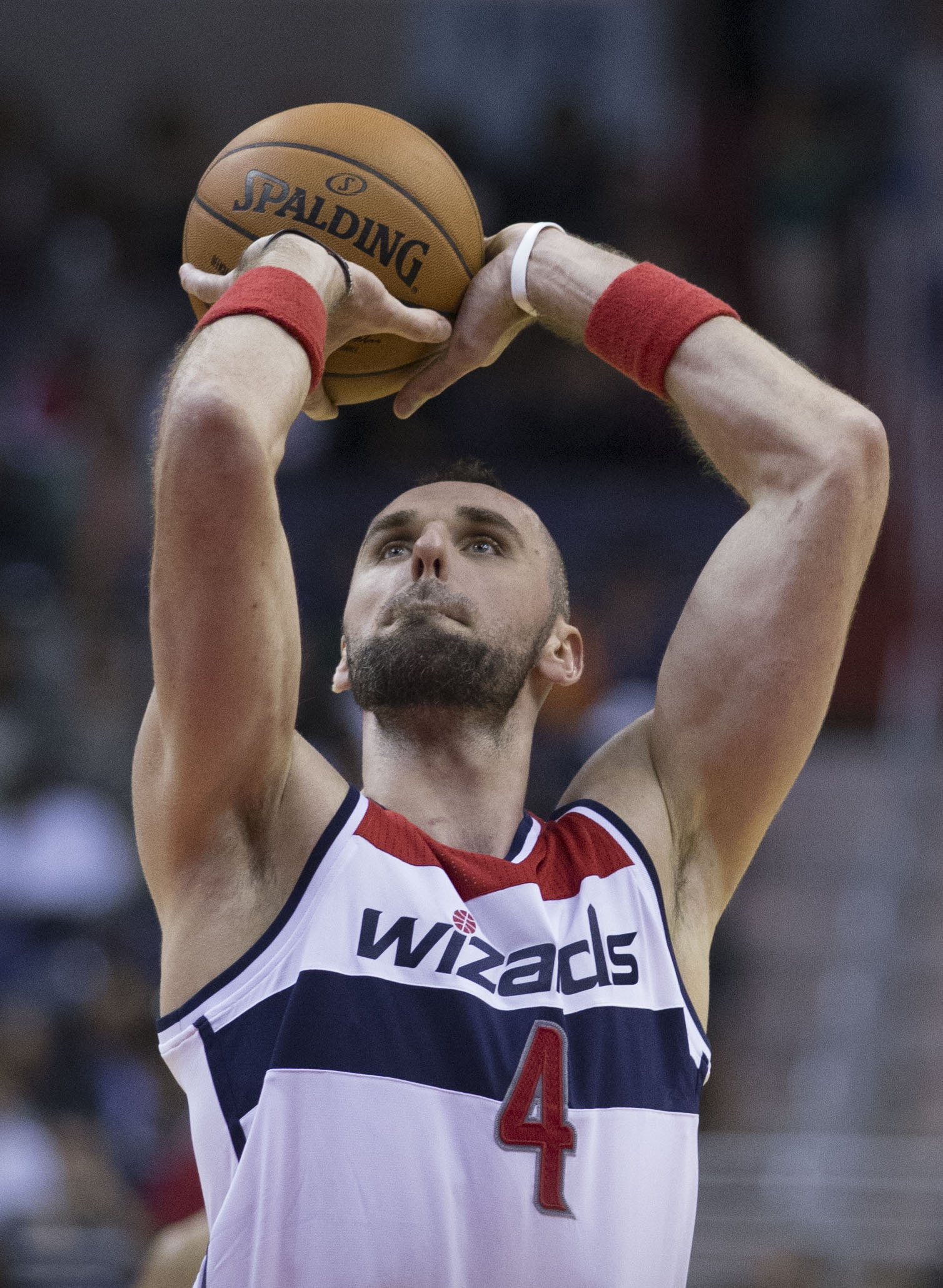
Marcin Gortat with the Washington Wizards in 2014

=== NBA/WNBA ===
- Agnieszka Bibrzycka – San Antonio Silver Stars
- Margo Dydek – Three WNBA teams
- Marcin Gortat – Orlando Magic, Phoenix Suns, Washington Wizards, Los Angeles Clippers
- Ewelina Kobryn – Seattle Storm, Phoenix Mercury
- Maciej Lampe (dual Polish/Swedish citizen) – Four NBA teams
- Krystyna Lara – Utah Starzz
- **Jeremy Sochan** – Baylor Bears, San Antonio Spurs
- Cezary Trybański – Three NBA teams

=== G League/College ===
- Maciej Bender – West Virginia Mountaineers, Mercer Bears
- Patrycja Czepiec – California Golden Bears
- Olek Czyz – Duke Blue Devils, Nevada Wolf Pack, and two D-League teams
- Jacek Duda – Providence Friars
- Marta Dydek – UTEP Miners
- Tomasz Gielo – Two college teams
- Karol Gruszecki – UT Arlington Mavericks
- Adam Hrycaniuk – Cincinnati Bearcats
- Michał Ignerski – Mississippi State Bulldogs
- Przemek Karnowski – Gonzaga Bulldogs
- Jakub Karwowski – Utah State Aggies
- Igor Milicić Jr. – Virginia Cavaliers, Tennessee Volunteers
- Jakub Nizioł – Cal Poly Mustangs men's basketball
- Łukasz Obrzut – Kentucky Wildcats
- Dominik Olejniczak – Drake Bulldogs, Ole Miss Rebels, Florida State Seminoles
- Dawid Przybyszewski – Vanderbilt Commodores
- Hubert Radke – Loyola Ramblers
- Paweł Stasiak – Washington State Cougars
- Maciej Zieliński – Providence Friars

== Portugal ==
=== NBA/WNBA ===
- Mery Andrade – Cleveland Rockers, Charlotte Sting
- Ticha Penicheiro – Old Dominion Lady Monarchs and three WNBA teams, most notably the Sacramento Monarchs
- **Neemias Queta** – Sacramento Kings, Stockton Kings, Boston Celtics, Maine Celtics

=== G League/College ===
- **Ruben Prey** – St. John's Red Storm
- Cândido Sá – Rutgers Scarlet Knights
- João Santos – Nevada Wolf Pack

== Romania ==
=== NBA/WNBA ===
- Gabriela Mărginean – Drexel Dragons, Minnesota Lynx
- Gheorghe Mureșan – Washington Bullets, New Jersey Nets
- Florina Pașcalău – Seattle Storm

=== G League/College ===
- Dragoș Lungu – San Diego Toreros
- Vlad Moldoveanu – George Mason Patriots, American Eagles
- Alexandru Olah – Northwestern University
- Constantin Popa – Miami Hurricanes

== Russia ==
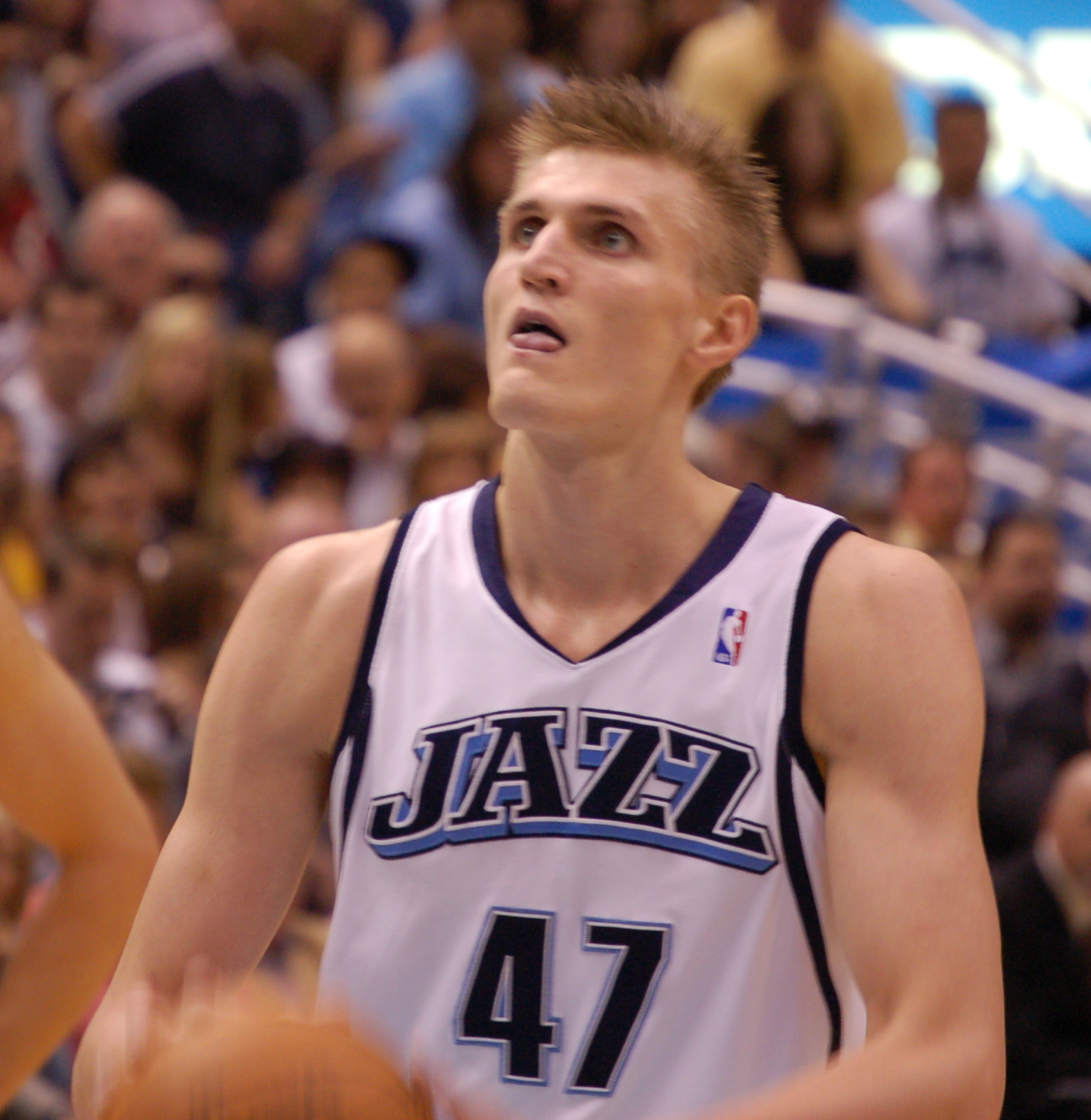
Andrei Kirilenko with the Utah Jazz in 2008

=== NBA/WNBA ===
- Svetlana Abrosimova – Connecticut Huskies and three WNBA teams
- Yelena Baranova – Three WNBA teams
- Sergei Bazarevich – Atlanta Hawks
- Evgeniya Belyakova – Los Angeles Sparks
- Joel Bolomboy – Weber State Wildcats, Utah Jazz
- **Egor Dëmin** – BYU Cougars, Brooklyn Nets
- **Vladislav Goldin** – Texas Tech Red Raiders, Florida Atlantic Owls, Michigan Wolverines, Miami Heat
- Sergey Karasev – Cleveland Cavaliers, Canton Charge, Brooklyn Nets
- Sasha Kaun – Kansas Jayhawks, Cleveland Cavaliers
- Victor Khryapa – Portland Trail Blazers, Chicago Bulls
- Andrei Kirilenko (also naturalized in the U.S.) – Four NBA teams, most notably with the Utah Jazz
- Yaroslav Korolev – Los Angeles Clippers and two D-League teams
- Ilona Korstin – Phoenix Mercury
- **Anastasiia Kosu** – Minnesota Lynx
- Sergei Monia – Portland Trail Blazers, Sacramento Kings
- Timofey Mozgov – New York Knicks, Denver Nuggets, Cleveland Cavaliers, Los Angeles Lakers, Brooklyn Nets, Orlando Magic
- Irina Osipova – Detroit Shock
- Pavel Podkolzin – Dallas Mavericks, Fort Worth Flyers
- Elen Shakirova – Houston Comets, Charlotte Sting
- Alexey Shved – Three NBA teams
- Maria Stepanova – Phoenix Mercury
- Maria Vadeeva – Los Angeles Sparks, Minnesota Lynx
- Natalia Vodopyanova – Seattle Storm
- Oksana Zakalyuzhnaya – Detroit Shock, Phoenix Mercury

=== G League/College ===
- Dmitri Domani – Saint Joseph's Hawks
- Vadim Fedotov – Buffalo Bulls
- Evgeni Kisurin – VCU Rams
- Fedor Likholitov – VCU Rams
- Svetlana Pankratova – VCU Rams
- Ruslan Pateev – Arizona State Sun Devils
- Kirill Pishchalnikov – VCU Rams
- Samson Ruzhentsev – Florida Gators
- Pavel Zakharov – Gonzaga Bulldogs

== Serbia ==
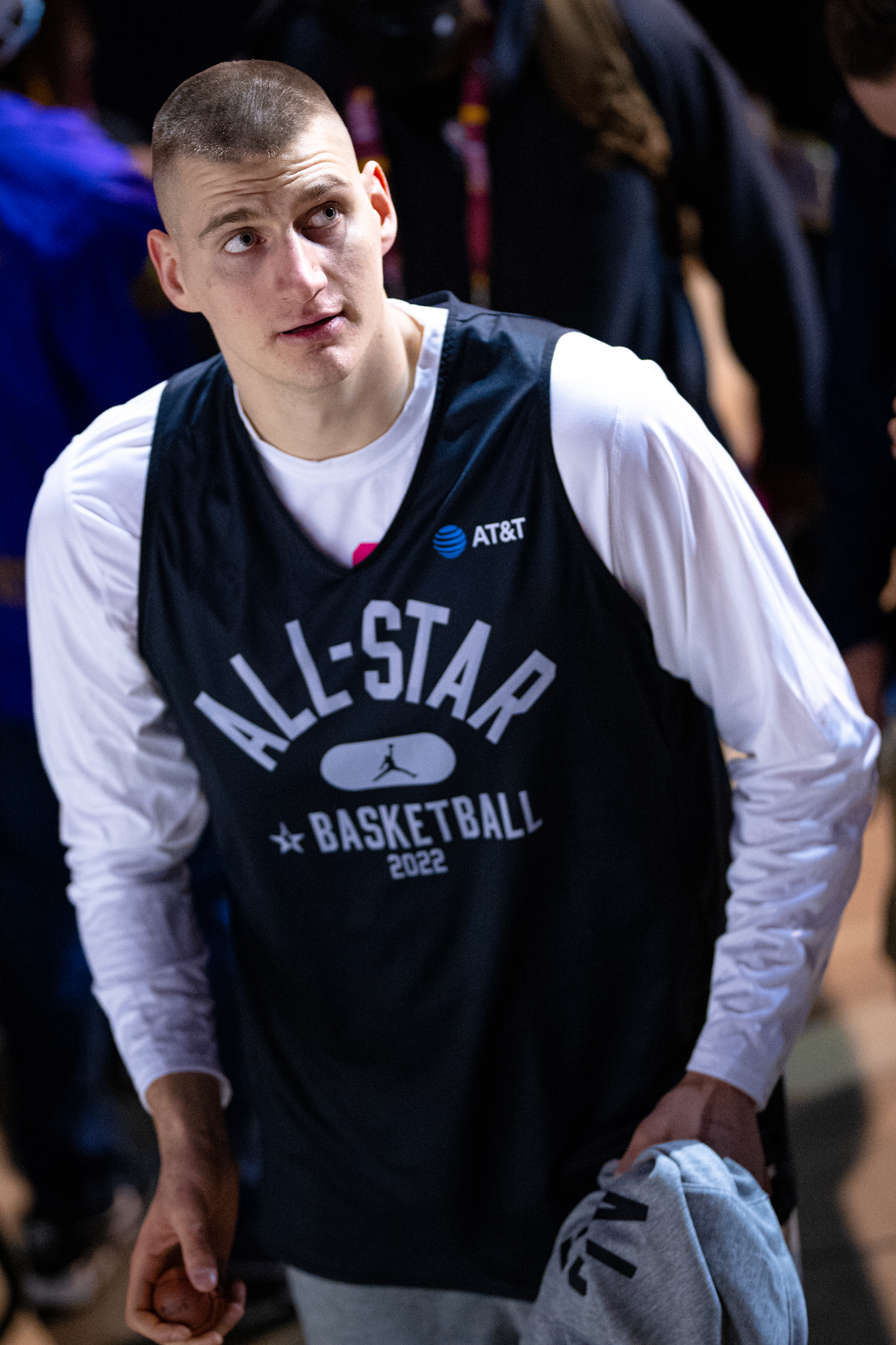
Nikola Jokić during 2022 NBA All-Star Weekend

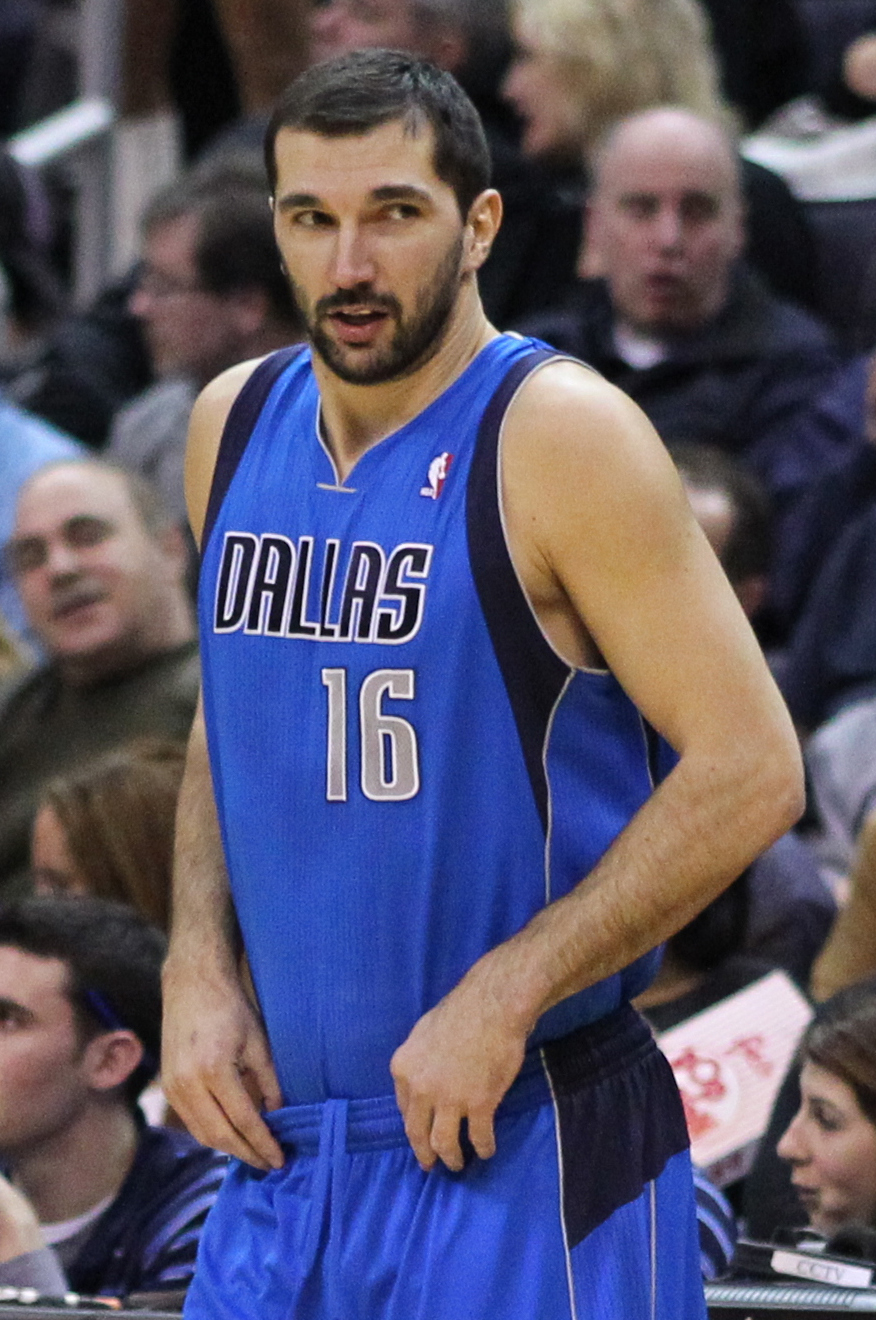
Peja Stojaković with the Dallas Mavericks in 2011

=== NBA/WNBA ===
- Miloš Babić – Tennessee Tech Golden Eagles, Cleveland Cavaliers and Miami Heat
- Nina Bjedov – Los Angeles Sparks
- Nemanja Bjelica – Minnesota Timberwolves, Sacramento Kings, Golden State Warriors
- **Bogdan Bogdanović** – Sacramento Kings, Atlanta Hawks
- Radisav Ćurčić – Dallas Mavericks
- Rastko Cvetković – Denver Nuggets
- Ana Dabović – Los Angeles Sparks
- Predrag Danilović – Miami Heat and Dallas Mavericks
- Vlade Divac – Los Angeles Lakers, Charlotte Hornets, and Sacramento Kings
- Aleksandar Đorđević – Portland Trail Blazers
- Gordana Grubin – Los Angeles Sparks, Indiana Fever, Phoenix Mercury, and Houston Comets
- Marko Gudurić – Memphis Grizzlies, Fenerbahçe
- Mile Ilić – New Jersey Nets
- Marko Jarić – Los Angeles Clippers, Minnesota Timberwolves, and Memphis Grizzlies
- **Nikola Jokić** – Denver Nuggets
- **Nikola Jović** – Miami Heat, Sioux Falls Skyforce
- Tina Krajišnik – Chicago Sky
- Nenad Krstić – New Jersey Nets, Oklahoma City Thunder, and Boston Celtics
- Ognjen Kuzmić – Golden State Warriors
- Katarina Lazić – New York Liberty
- Boban Marjanović – San Antonio Spurs, Austin Spurs, Detroit Pistons, Los Angeles Clippers, Philadelphia 76ers, Dallas Mavericks, Houston Rockets
- Vasilije Micić – Oklahoma City Thunder, Charlotte Hornets, Phoenix Suns
- Nikolina Milić – Minnesota Lynx
- Darko Miličić – Detroit Pistons, Orlando Magic, Memphis Grizzlies, New York Knicks, Minnesota Timberwolves, and Boston Celtics
- Jelena Milovanović – Washington Mystics
- Nemanja Nedović – Golden State Warriors
- Mila Nikolić – Houston Comets
- Žarko Paspalj – San Antonio Spurs
- Jasmina Perazić – New York Liberty
- Kosta Perović – Golden State Warriors
- Sonja Petrović – Chicago Sky, Phoenix Mercury
- Filip Petrušev – Gonzaga Bulldogs, Philadelphia 76ers, Sacramento Kings, Stockton Kings
- Aleksej Pokuševski – Oklahoma City Thunder, Oklahoma City Blue
- Vladimir Radmanović – Seattle SuperSonics, Los Angeles Clippers, Los Angeles Lakers, Charlotte Bobcats, Golden State Warriors, Atlanta Hawks, and Chicago Bulls
- Miroslav Raduljica – Milwaukee Bucks, Minnesota Timberwolves
- Igor Rakočević – Minnesota Timberwolves
- Željko Rebrača – Detroit Pistons, Atlanta Hawks, and Los Angeles Clippers
- Alen Smailagić – Golden State Warriors
- Peja Stojaković – Sacramento Kings, Indiana Pacers, New Orleans Hornets, Toronto Raptors, and Dallas Mavericks
- Dragan Tarlać – Chicago Bulls
- Miloš Teodosić – Los Angeles Clippers
- **Nikola Topić** – Oklahoma City Thunder
- Slobodanka Tuvić – Phoenix Mercury
- Daliborka Vilipić – Los Angeles Sparks
- Milica Vukadinović – Charlotte Sting
- **Tristan Vukčević** – Washington Wizards, Capital City Go-Go

=== G League/College ===
- Nemanja Calasan (also a naturalized citizen of Switzerland) – Purdue Boilermakers
- Darko Čohadarević – Texas Tech Red Raiders
- Nikola Dragović – UCLA Bruins
- Luka Drča – Utah Utes
- **Savo Drezgić** – Georgia Bulldogs
- Zoran Jovanović – LSU Tigers
- Stefan Kenić – Cleveland State Vikings, Chattanooga Mocs
- Balša Koprivica – Florida State Seminoles
- Nikola Koprivica – Washington State Cougars
- Dejan Kravić – Texas Tech Red Raiders
- Mirko Pavlović – Southern Illinois Salukis
- Miroslav Pecarski – Marist Red Foxes
- Jasmina Perazić – Maryland Terrapins
- Nemanja Petrović – Saint Joseph's Hawks
- Nedeljko Prijovic – Texas State Bobcats, Maine Black Bears
- Vasilije Pušica – San Diego Toreros, Northeastern Huskies
- Ivan Radenović – Arizona Wildcats
- Zoran Radović – Wichita State Shockers
- Nikola Rakićević – Buffalo Bulls
- Dušan Ristić – Arizona Wildcats
- Boban Savović – Ohio State Buckeyes
- Marko Špica – Central Michigan Chippewas
- Jelena Špirić – Nebraska Cornhuskers
- Vuk Vulikić – UTEP Miners

== Slovakia ==
=== NBA/WNBA ===
- Andrea Kuklová – Phoenix Mercury
- Richard Petruška – Houston Rockets
- Zuzana Žirková – Washington Mystics

=== G League/College ===
- Vladimír Brodziansky – TCU Horned Frogs
- Michal Čekovský – Maryland Terrapins
- Marek Dolezaj – Syracuse Orange
- Martin Rančík – Iowa State Cyclones

== Slovenia ==
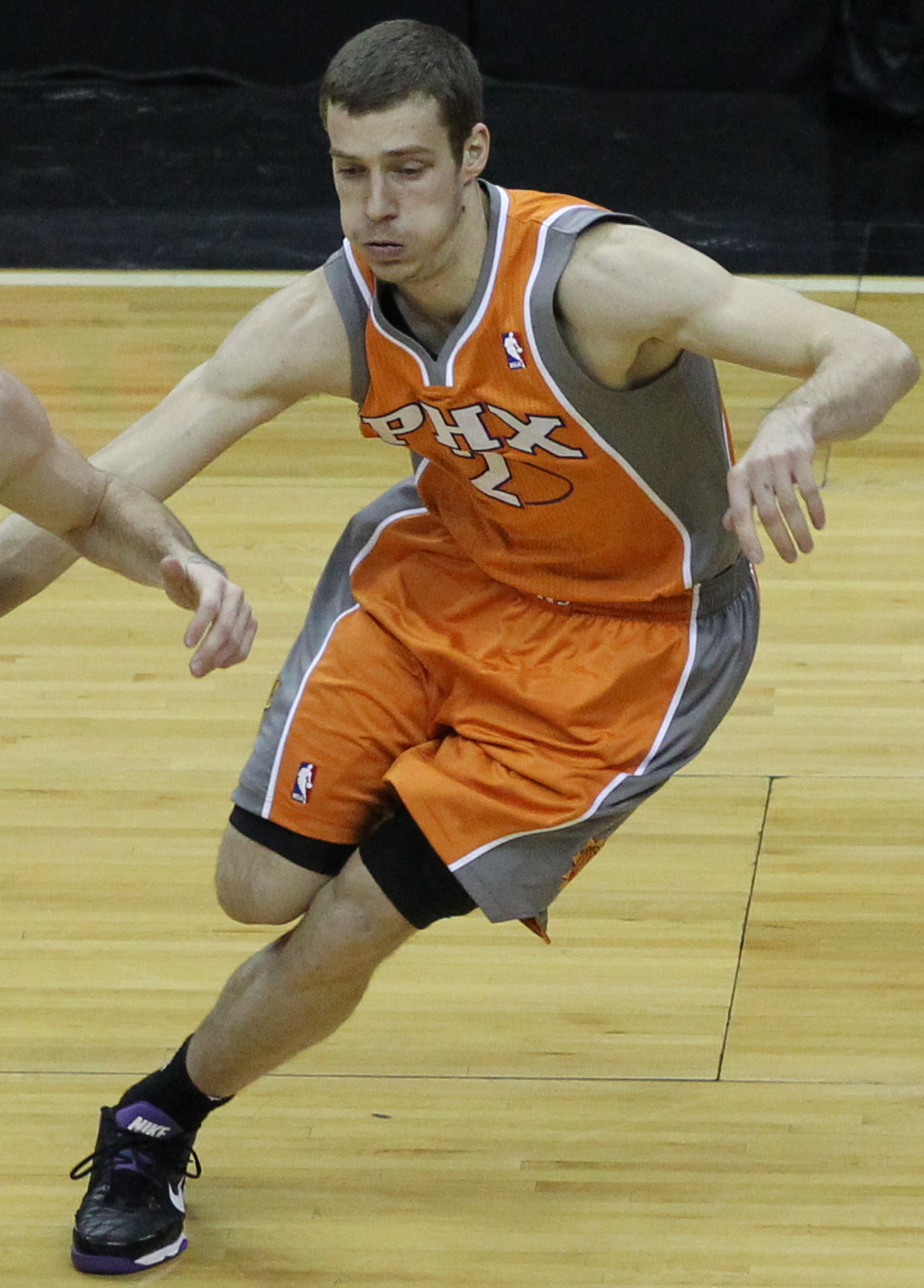
Goran Dragić with the Phoenix Suns in 2011

=== NBA/WNBA ===
- Primož Brezec – Six NBA teams
- **Vlatko Čančar** – Denver Nuggets, Erie Bayhawks, Grand Rapids Gold
- **Luka Dončić** – Dallas Mavericks, Los Angeles Lakers
- Goran Dragić – Seven NBA teams
- Zoran Dragić – Phoenix Suns, Miami Heat
- Marko Milič – Phoenix Suns
- Boštjan Nachbar – Three NBA teams
- Radoslav Nesterović – Four NBA teams
- Uroš Slokar – Toronto Raptors
- Beno Udrih – Eight NBA teams
- Sasha Vujačić – Four NBA teams

=== G League/College ===
- Urban Klavžar – Florida Gators
- Martin Krampelj – Creighton Bluejays
- Erazem Lorbek – Michigan State Spartans

== Spain ==
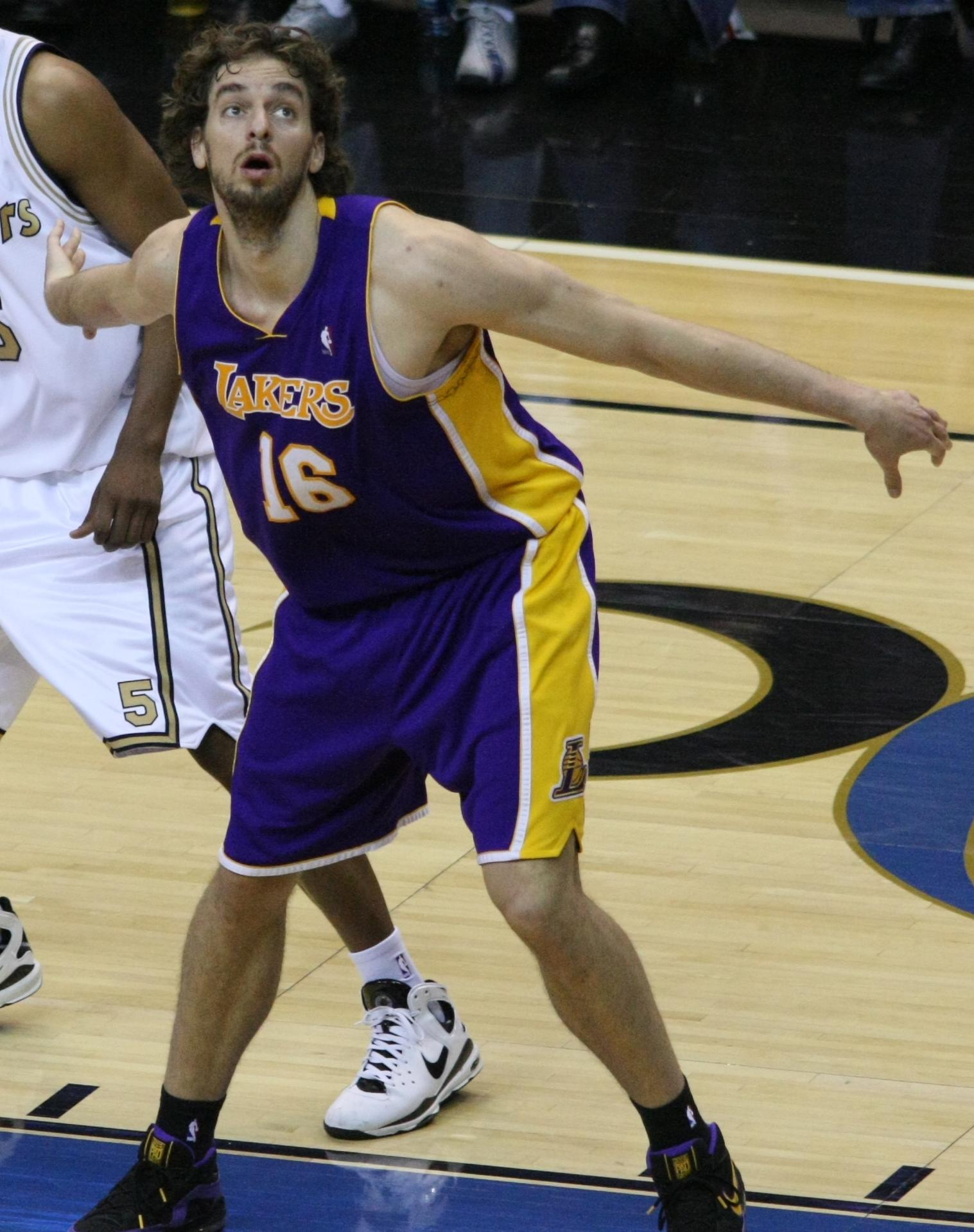
Pau Gasol with the Los Angeles Lakers in 2008

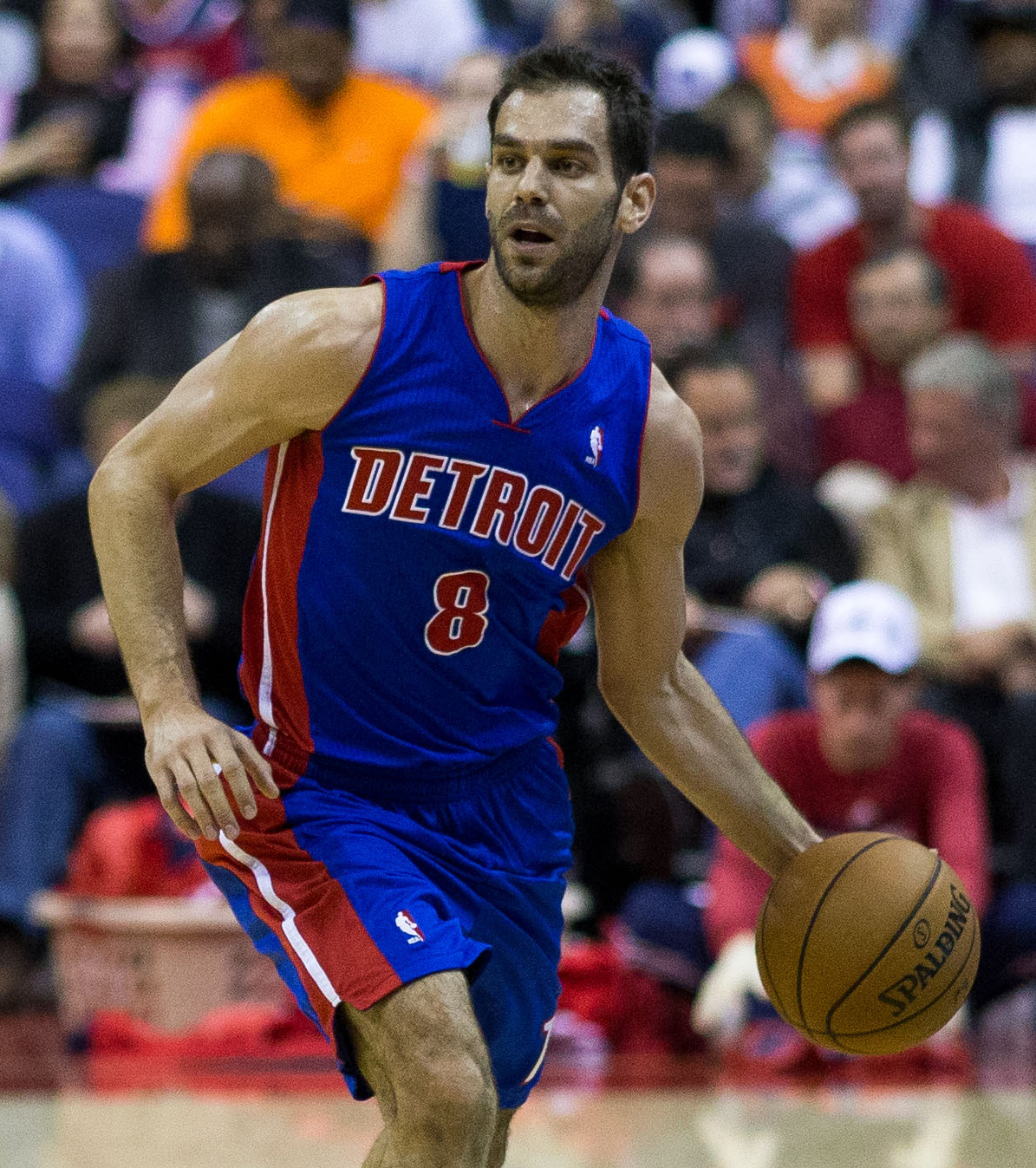
José Calderón with the Detroit Pistons in 2013

=== NBA/WNBA ===
- Álex Abrines – Oklahoma City Thunder
- Elisa Aguilar – Utah Starzz
- **Santiago Aldama** – Memphis Grizzlies
- José Calderón – Seven NBA teams
- **Maite Cazorla** – Oregon Ducks, Atlanta Dream
- Elisabeth Cebrián – New York Liberty
- Víctor Claver – Portland Trail Blazers
- Anna Cruz – New York Liberty, Minnesota Lynx
- Marta Fernández – Los Angeles Sparks
- Rudy Fernández – Portland Trail Blazers, Denver Nuggets
- Marina Ferragut – New York Liberty
- Jorge Garbajosa – Toronto Raptors
- Begoña García – Detroit Shock
- Usman Garuba – Houston Rockets
- Pau Gasol – Six NBA teams but most notably with the Los Angeles Lakers
- Marc Gasol – Memphis Grizzlies, Toronto Raptors, Los Angeles Lakers
- **Hugo González** – Boston Celtics
- Willy Hernangómez – New York Knicks, Charlotte Hornets, New Orleans Pelicans
- Juancho Hernangómez – Denver Nuggets, Minnesota Timberwolves, Boston Celtics, Utah Jazz, Toronto Raptors
- Serge Ibaka (born in the Republic of the Congo) – Oklahoma City Thunder, Orlando Magic, Toronto Raptors, Los Angeles Clippers, Milwaukee Bucks
- Raül López – Utah Jazz
- **Sancho Lyttle** (dual Vincentian/Spanish citizen) – Houston Comets, Atlanta Dream, currently with the Phoenix Mercury
- Fernando Martín – Portland Trail Blazers
- Nuria Martínez – Minnesota Lynx
- Nikola Mirotić (born in Montenegro) – Chicago Bulls, New Orleans Pelicans, Milwaukee Bucks
- Anna Montañana – Minnesota Lynx
- Juan Carlos Navarro – Memphis Grizzlies
- **Eli Ndiaye** (born in Senegal) – Atlanta Hawks
- **Astou Ndour** (born in Senegal) – San Antonio Stars, Chicago Sky
- Sergio Rodríguez – Four NBA teams
- **Leticia Romero** – Kansas State Wildcats, Florida State Seminoles, Dallas Wings
- Ricky Rubio – Minnesota Timberwolves, Utah Jazz, Phoenix Suns, Indiana Pacers, Cleveland Cavaliers
- Isabel Sánchez – Detroit Shock
- Amaya Valdemoro – Houston Comets
- Marta Xargay – Phoenix Mercury

=== G League/College ===
- Francis Alonso – UNC Greensboro Spartans
- Ivan Aurrecoechea – New Mexico State Aggies
- Rodrigo de la Fuente – Washington State Cougars
- Óscar García – Fairfield Stags
- Iker Iturbe – Clemson Tigers
- Antonio Martín – Pepperdine Waves
- Javier Mendiburu – Green Bay Phoenix
- Leonor Rodríguez – Florida State Seminoles
- Sebastian Saiz – Ole Miss Rebels

== Sweden ==
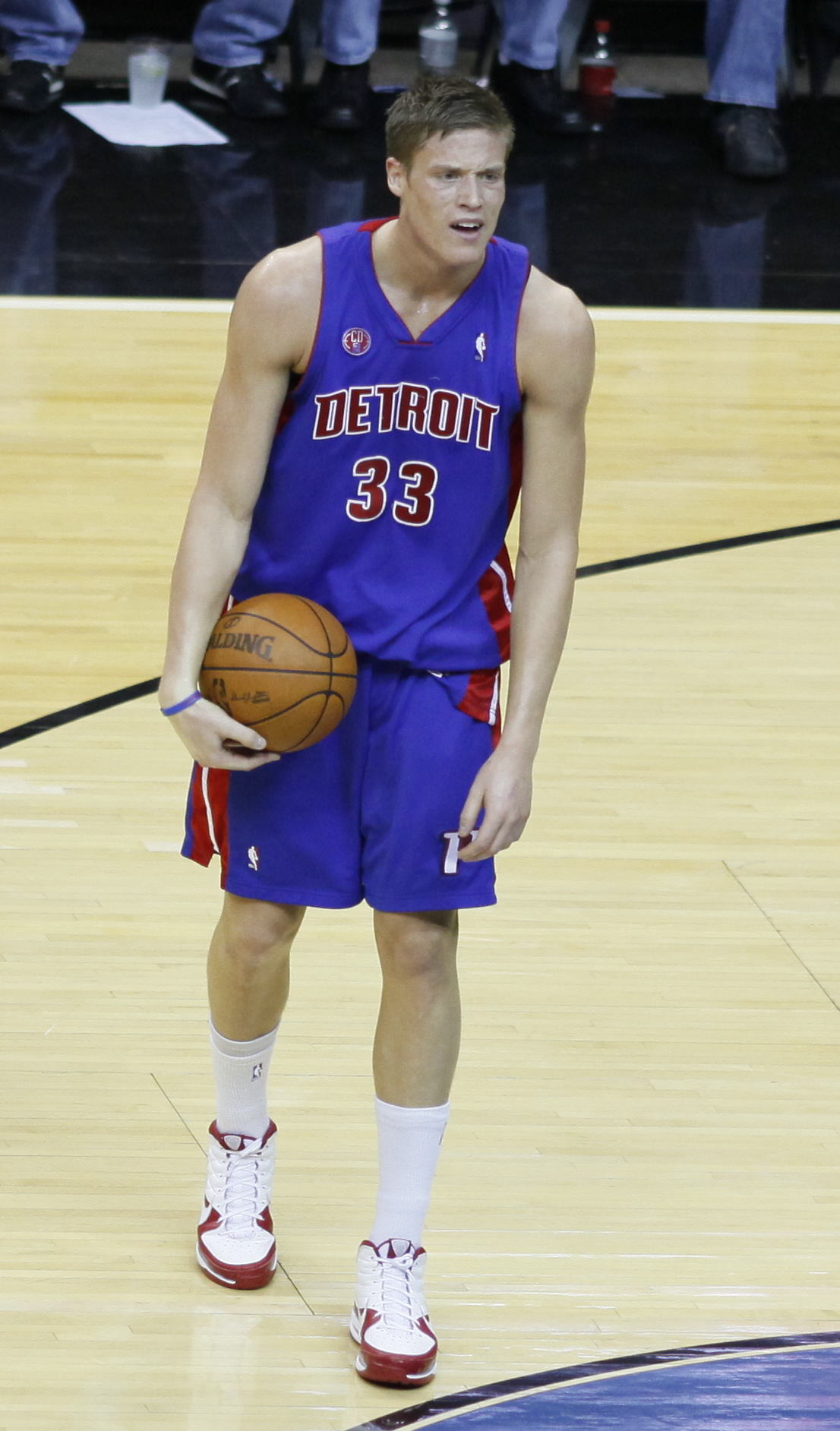
Jonas Jerebko with the Detroit Pistons in 2009

=== NBA/WNBA ===
- Farhiya Abdi (dual Swedish/Somali citizen by birth) – Los Angeles Sparks
- Frida Eldebrink – San Antonio Stars
- Jonas Jerebko (dual Swedish/US citizen by birth) – Detroit Pistons, Boston Celtics, Utah Jazz, Golden State Warriors
- **Bobi Klintman** – Detroit Pistons
- Tanja Kostic – Oregon State Beavers and three teams in the ABL and WNBA
- **Pelle Larsson** – Arizona Wildcats, Miami Heat
- Chioma Nnamaka – Georgia Tech Yellow Jackets, Atlanta Dream
- Jeffery Taylor (dual Swedish/US citizen by birth) – Vanderbilt Commodores, Charlotte Bobcats/Hornets
- Amanda Zahui B. (dual Swedish/Ivorian citizen by birth) – Minnesota Golden Gophers, Tulsa Shock/Dallas Wings, New York Liberty

=== G League/College ===
- Elliot Cadeau – North Carolina Tar Heels
- Selma Delibašić – Duquesne Dukes
- Carl Engström – Alabama Crimson Tide
- Midde Hamrin – Lamar Lady Cardinals
- Christian Maråker – Pacific Tigers

== Switzerland ==
=== NBA/WNBA ===
- **Clint Capela** – Houston Rockets, Atlanta Hawks
- **Kyshawn George** – Washington Wizards
- **Yanic Konan Niederhäuser** – Penn State Nittany Lions, Los Angeles Clippers
- Thabo Sefolosha – Oklahoma City Thunder, Atlanta Hawks, Utah Jazz

=== G League/College ===
- Anthony Polite – Florida State Seminoles

== Turkey ==
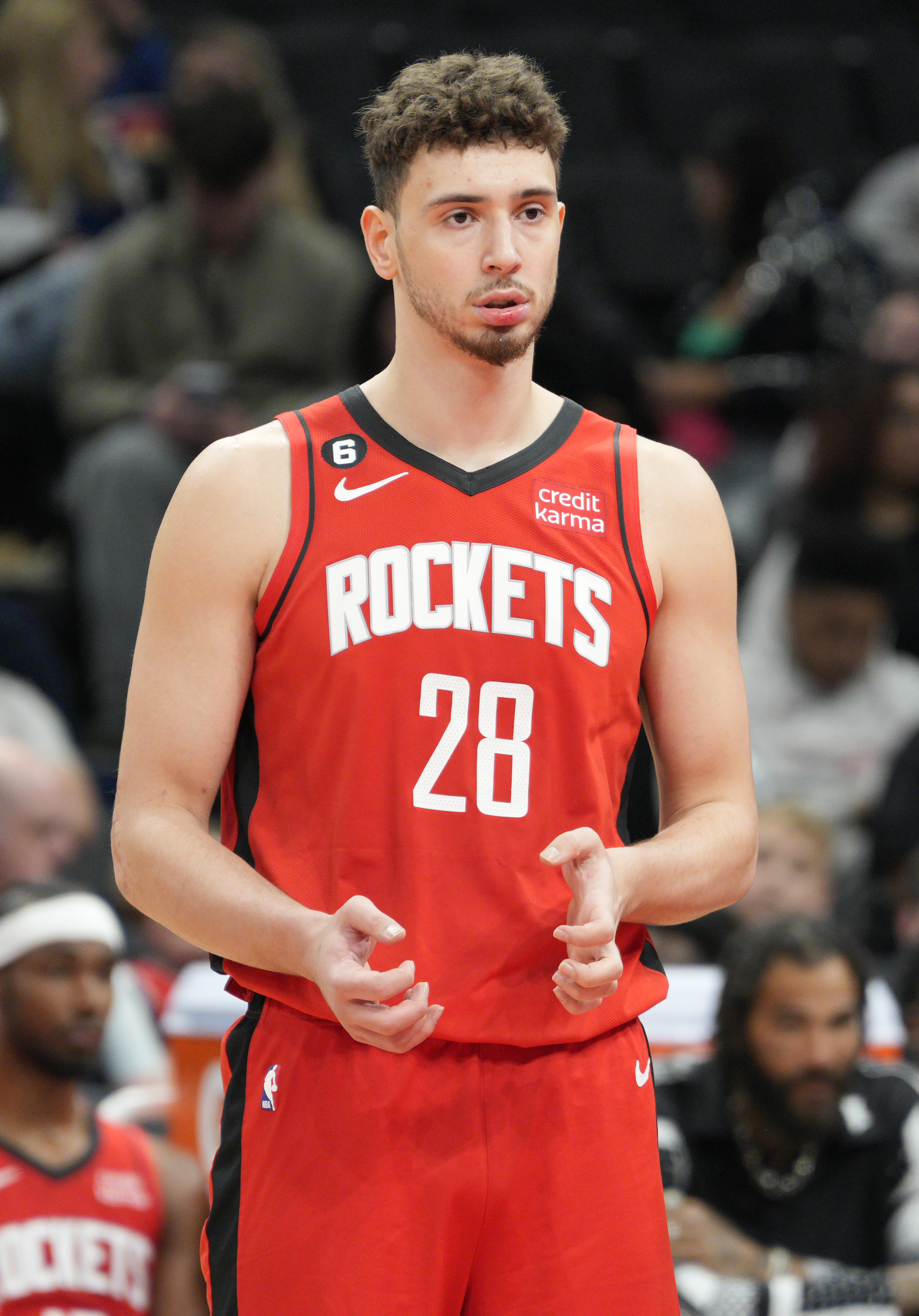
Alperen Şengün with the Houston Rockets in 2023

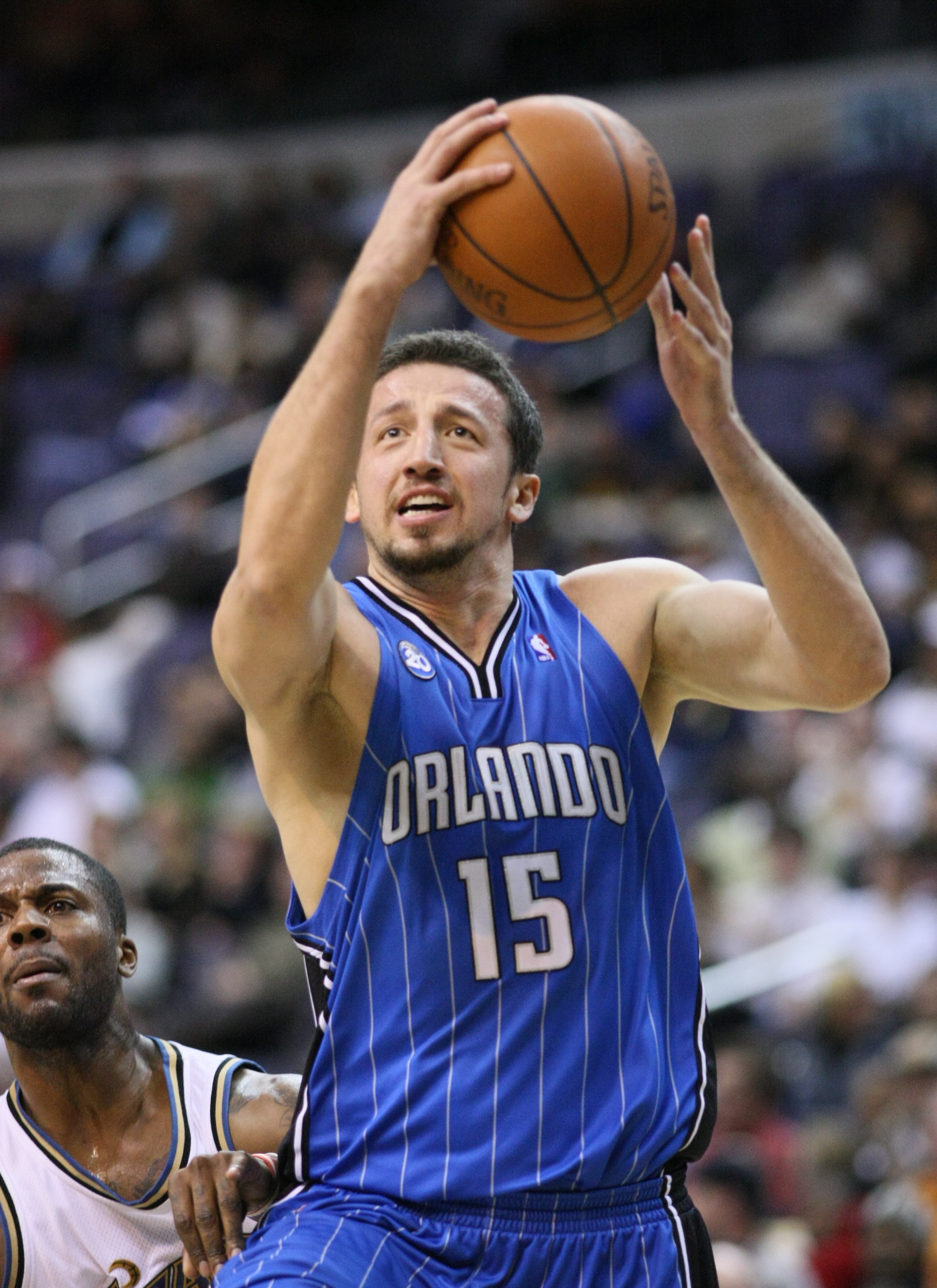
Hedo Türkoğlu with the Orlando Magic in 2008

=== NBA/WNBA ===
- Furkan Aldemir – Philadelphia 76ers
- Ömer Aşık – Three NBA teams, most notably the Chicago Bulls, Houston Rockets
- Onuralp Bitim – Chicago Bulls
- **Adem Bona** (dual Turkish/Nigerian citizen) – UCLA Bruins, Philadelphia 76ers
- Semih Erden – Boston Celtics, Cleveland Cavaliers
- Ersan İlyasova – Six NBA teams, including the Milwaukee Bucks
- Enes Kanter Freedom – Utah Jazz, Oklahoma City Thunder, New York Knicks, Boston Celtics, Portland Trail Blazers
- Furkan Korkmaz – Philadelphia 76ers
- İbrahim Kutluay – Seattle SuperSonics
- Mehmet Okur – Three NBA teams, most notably the Utah Jazz
- Cedi Osman – Cleveland Cavaliers
- **Alperen Şengün** – Houston Rockets
- Mirsad Türkcan (born in modern-day Serbia) – New York Knicks, Milwaukee Bucks
- Hedo Türkoğlu – Six NBA teams, most notably the Orlando Magic
- **Sevgi Uzun** – Dallas Wings, Phoenix Mercury
- Nevriye Yılmaz – Phoenix Mercury, San Antonio Silver Stars
- Ömer Yurtseven – North Carolina State Wolfpack, Georgetown Hoyas, Miami Heat, Utah Jazz

=== G League/College ===
- Nihan Anaz – South Carolina Gamecocks, California Golden Bears
- Engin Atsür – NC State Wolfpack
- Emre Atsür – Western Carolina Catamounts
- Gökbörü Aygar – Northeastern Huskies
- Doğuş Balbay – Texas Longhorns
- Ömer Büyükaycan – Loyola Ramblers
- Berke Büyüktuncel – UCLA Bruins, Nebraska Cornhuskers
- İpek Derici – North Carolina Tar Heels
- Erten Gazi (dual Cypriot/Turkish citizen by birth) – DePaul Blue Demons, Fordham Rams
- Kerem Kanter – Xavier Musketeers
- Deniz Kılıçlı – West Virginia Mountaineers
- Şebnem Kimyacıoğlu (dual US/Turkish citizen by birth) – Stanford Cardinal
- Samet Yiğitoğlu – SMU Mustangs

== Ukraine ==
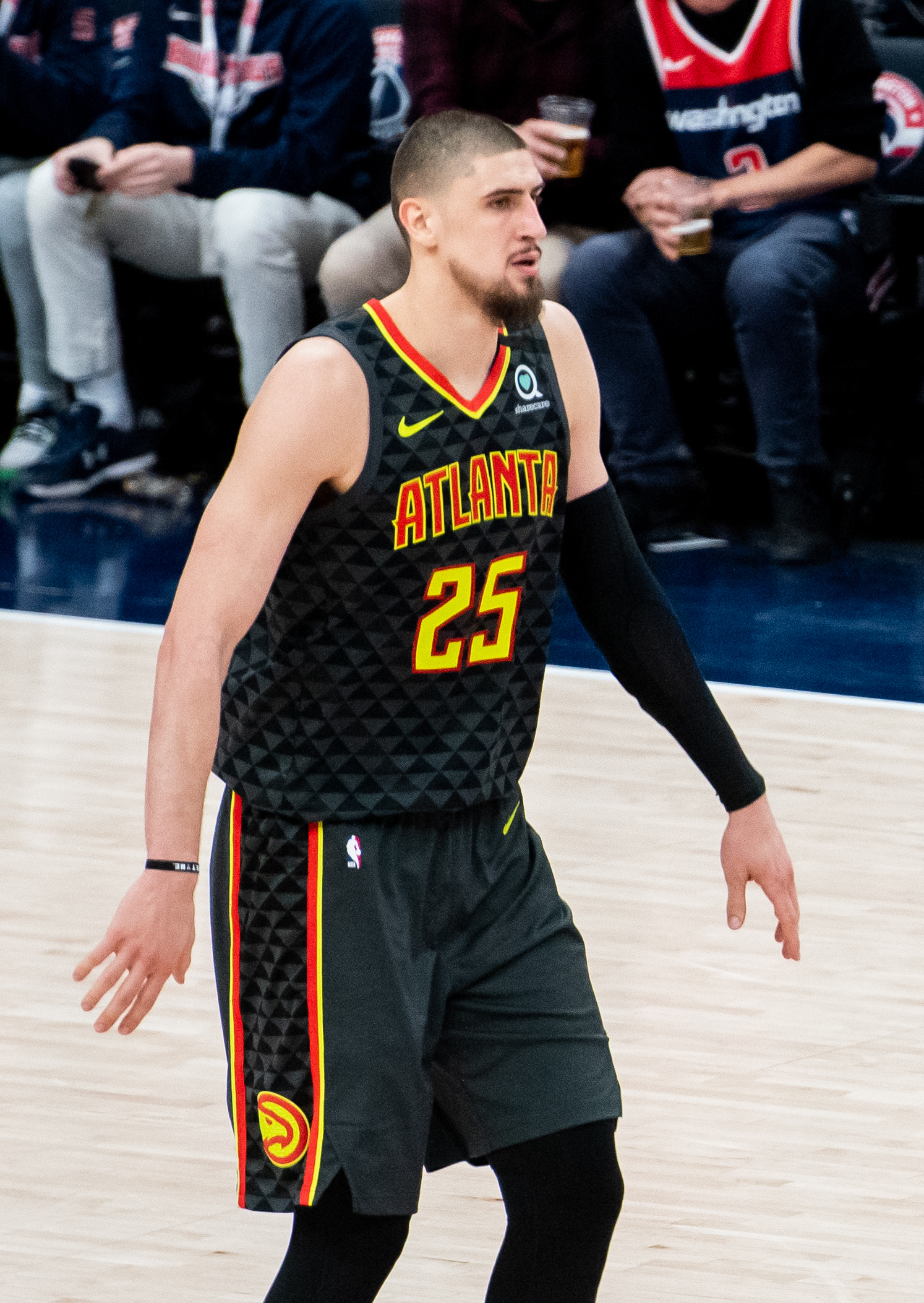
Alex Len with the Atlanta Hawks in 2020

=== NBA/WNBA ===
- Valeria Berezhynska – San Antonio Stars
- Kyrylo Fesenko – Utah Jazz, Indiana Pacers
- Olga Firsova – Kansas State Wildcats, New York Liberty
- Viacheslav Kravtsov – Detroit Pistons, Phoenix Suns
- **Alex Len** – Maryland Terrapins, Phoenix Suns, Atlanta Hawks, Sacramento Kings, Los Angeles Lakers
- Slava Medvedenko – Los Angeles Lakers, Atlanta Hawks
- **Sviatoslav Mykhailiuk** – Kansas Jayhawks and 8 NBA teams
- Inga Orekhova – South Florida Bulls, Atlanta Dream
- Oleksiy Pecherov – Washington Wizards, Minnesota Timberwolves
- Vitaly Potapenko – Wright State Raiders and four NBA teams
- **Max Shulga** – Utah State Aggies, Boston Celtics
- **Dmytro Skapintsev** – New York Knicks, Westchester Knicks
- Alexander Volkov – Atlanta Hawks

=== G League/College ===
- Bogdan Bliznyuk – Eastern Washington Eagles
- Pavlo Dziuba – Maryland Terrapins
- Volodymyr Gerun – West Virginia Mountaineers, Portland Pilots
- Nikita Konstantynovskyi – Tulsa Golden Hurricane
- Volodymyr Markovetskyy – San Francisco Dons
- Kyryl Natyazhko – Arizona Wildcats
- Rostyslav Novitshyi – Fordham Rams
- Ilya Tyrtyshnik – Ole Miss Rebels

== United Kingdom ==
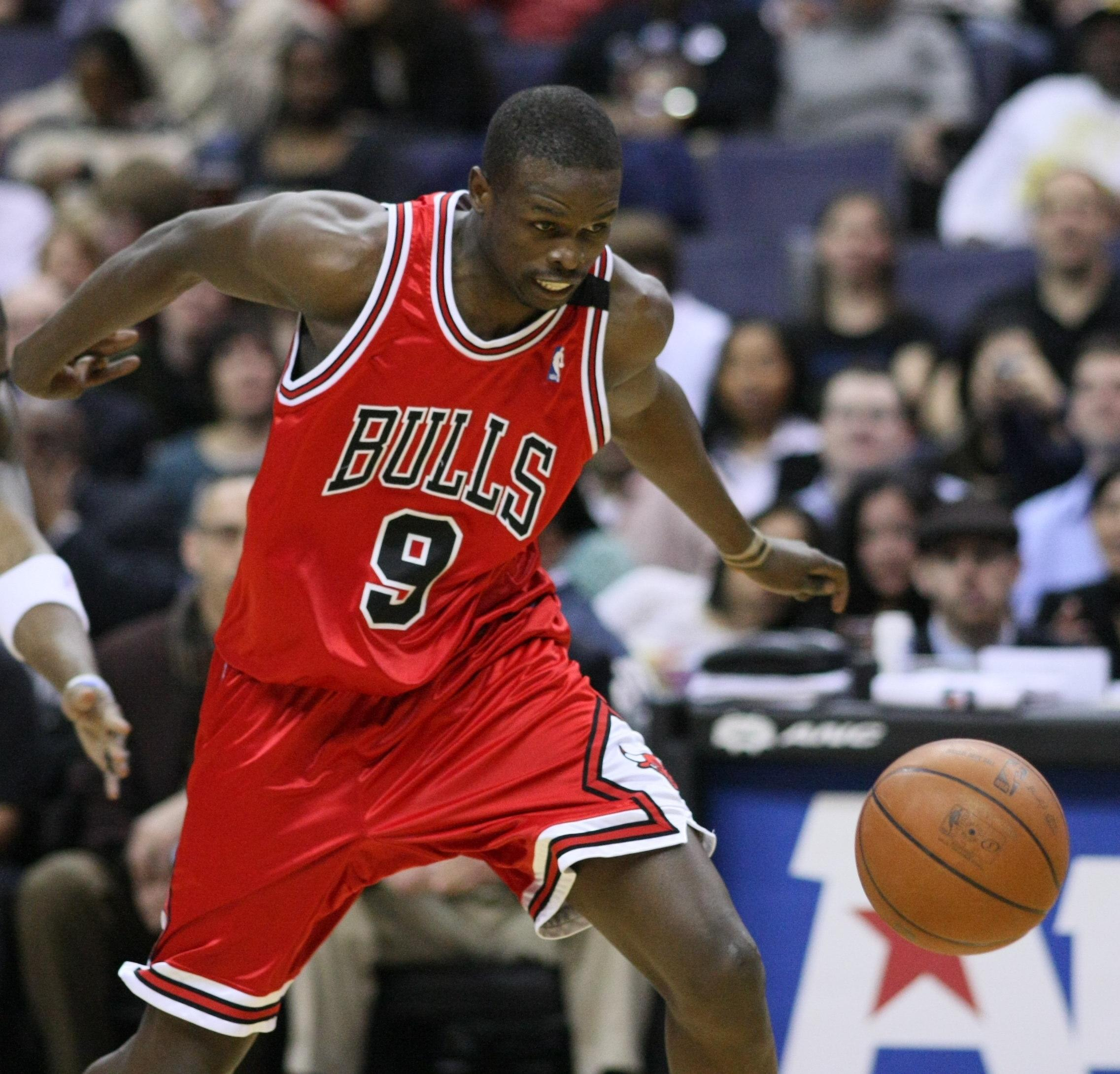
Luol Deng with the Chicago Bulls in 2009

=== NBA/WNBA ===
- John Amaechi (dual US/British citizen by birth) – Vanderbilt Commodores, Penn State Nittany Lions, and three NBA teams
- Kristine Anigwe – 5 WNBA teams
- **OG Anunoby** – Indiana Hoosiers, Toronto Raptors
- Robert Archibald – Illinois Fighting Illini and four NBA teams
- Steve Bucknall – Los Angeles Lakers
- Andrea Congreaves – Charlotte Sting, Orlando Miracle
- Luol Deng (born in what is now South Sudan, naturalized in the UK) – Duke Blue Devils and five NBA teams, most notably the Chicago Bulls
- James Donaldson (dual British/US citizen) – Washington State Cougars and five NBA teams
- Ndudi Ebi – Minnesota Timberwolves
- **Tosan Evbuomwan** – Princeton Tigers, Detroit Pistons
- Joel Freeland – Portland Trail Blazers
- **Temi Fagbenle** (dual US/British citizen) – Harvard Crimson, USC Trojans, Minnesota Lynx
- Ben Gordon (dual British/US citizen) – UConn Huskies and four NBA teams, also with the Texas Legends in the G League
- Chris Harris – St. Louis Hawks, Rochester Royals
- Pops Mensah-Bonsu – George Washington Colonials and five NBA teams
- Byron Mullens (dual US/British citizen by birth) – Ohio State Buckeyes and four NBA teams
- Karlie Samuelson (dual US/British citizen by birth) – Stanford Cardinal, Los Angeles Sparks, Dallas Wings; has represented the UK at youth and senior levels.
- **Katie Lou Samuelson** (dual US/British citizen by birth) – UConn Huskies, Chicago Sky, Dallas Wings; has represented the US at youth level
- Shona Thorburn (dual British/Canadian citizen) – Utah Utes, Seattle Storm
- **Amari Williams** – Kentucky Wildcats, Boston Celtics

=== G League/College ===
- Dominique Allen – Oral Roberts Golden Eagles
- Kieron Achara – Duquesne Dukes
- Ogo Adegboye – St. Bonaventure Bonnies
- Devan Bailey – Central Connecticut Blue Devils
- Eric Boateng – Arizona State Sun Devils and two D-League teams
- Matthew Bryan-Amaning – Washington Huskies
- Ben Eaves – Connecticut Huskies, Rhode Island Rams
- Chantelle Handy – Marshall Thundering Herd
- Andrew Lawrence – Charleston Cougars
- Mike Lenzly – Wofford Terriers
- Richard Midgley – California Bears
- Justin Robinson – Rider Broncs
- Andrew Sullivan – Villanova Wildcats
- Raphell Thomas-Edwards – Buffalo Bulls

== See also ==
- List of foreign NBA players
- List of foreign NBA coaches
- List of NBA players by country:
  - List of Australian NBA players
  - List of Canadian NBA players
  - List of Croatian NBA players
  - List of French NBA players
  - List of Greek NBA players
  - List of Italian NBA players
  - List of Lithuanian NBA players
  - List of Montenegrin NBA players
  - List of Serbian NBA players
  - List of Turkish NBA players
- Race and ethnicity in the NBA
- List of foreign WNBA players
