= List of NBA players born outside the United States =

List of current and former foreign NBA players

In the National Basketball Association, players born outside of the United States are often known as international players. Players who were born in U.S. overseas territories, such as Puerto Rico and the U.S. Virgin Islands, are considered international players even if they are U.S. citizens. Players whose nationality is listed as United States were born outside of the country but have represented them in international basketball tournament. Players who were born outside the United States to American parents and players who became naturalized U.S. citizens are also included in that section. In some borderline cases, the NBA takes into consideration whether a player desires to be identified as international.

Hank Biasatti, who was born in Italy and raised in Canada, and Charlie Hoefer, Biasatti's German teammate, were the first international players in the league in 1946. The number of international players in the league rose after the formation of the Dream Team when NBA players were allowed into Olympic play starting in 1992. Global interest in basketball subsequently soared. On the opening day of the 1991–92 season, NBA rosters included 23 international players from 18 countries. At the start of the 2016–17 season, there was a record-high 113 international players from 41 countries and territories. In the start of the 2017–18 season, there were 108 international players from a record-high 42 countries and territories, including five players signed up through the newly implemented two-way contract.

The number of players on opening-night rosters broke an all-time league record first set in 2010–11 and tied in 2012–13, and the number of countries represented surpassed the record set in 2010–11. In addition, the San Antonio Spurs set an all-time record for international players on an opening-night squad, with 10 during the 2013–14 season. The record number of international players was broken again in 2022–23, with a total of 120 players from 40 countries on opening night rosters.

Including the United States, 94 countries have produced at least one NBA player in total. As of the 2024–25 season, Canada has produced the most foreign NBA players, with 68. From European countries, France has produced 58 players, Serbia has produced 33, Croatia has produced 24, and Germany and Spain have produced 21. From Oceania, Australia has produced 37 players while New Zealand has produced 3 players. From African countries, Nigeria and Senegal have produced 30 and 14 players respectively. From Latin America, Puerto Rico has produced 21 players, Brazil has produced 20, and Argentina has produced 16. From Asian countries, China has produced 9 players, while Japan and Lebanon have produced 6. Among transcontinental countries, Turkey, Russia, and Georgia have produced 16, 15 and 11 players respectively.

== Summary ==
=== Africa ===
Region	Players	Notes
Nigeria	30	Including 17 foreign-born Nigerians
Senegal	14	Including 1 U.S.-born Senegalese
South Sudan	10	Including 5 foreign-born South Sudanese
Cameroon	8	Including 3 foreign-born Cameroonians
Democratic Republic of the Congo	6	
Mali	4	
Ghana	3	
Ivory Coast	3	Including 3 U.S.-born Ivorians
Egypt (Note: A transcontinental country.)	2	
Gabon	2	
Guinea	2	
Libya	2	Including 2 U.S.-born Libyans
Uganda	2	Including 2 U.S.-born Ugandans
Angola	1	
Cape Verde	1	
Liberia	1	Including 1 U.S.-born Liberian
Sudan	1	
Tanzania	1	
Tunisia	1	
Africa	94	Including 34 foreign or U.S.-born naturalized players

=== Americas ===
Region	Players	Notes
Canada	68	Including 11 foreign-born Canadians
Puerto Rico	21	Including 13 U.S.-born Puerto Ricans
Brazil	20	Including 1 U.S.-born Brazilian
Argentina	16	
Dominican Republic	15	Including 5 U.S.-born Dominicans
Jamaica	12	Including 6 U.S.-born Jamaicans
Bahamas	9	Including 2 U.S.-born Bahamians
Mexico	7	Including 3 U.S.-born Mexicans
Venezuela	6	Including 4 foreign-born Venezuelans
Panama	4	Including 2 U.S.-born Panamanians
United States Virgin Islands	4	Including 2 U.S.-born Virgin Islanders
Belize	3	Including 3 U.S.-born Belizeans
Haiti	3	
Cuba	2	
Guyana	2	
Trinidad and Tobago	2	Including 1 U.S.-born Trinidadian
Antigua and Barbuda	1	Including 1 U.S.-born Antiguan
Bolivia	1	Including 1 U.S.-born Bolivian
British Virgin Islands	1	
Colombia	1	
Dominica	1	
Nicaragua	1	
Uruguay	1	
America	201	Including 54 foreign or U.S.-born naturalized players

=== Asia ===
Region	Players	Notes
China	9	Including 1 U.S.-born Chinese
Japan	6	Including 2 U.S.-born Japanese
Lebanon	6	Including 5 foreign-born Lebanese
Philippines	3	Including 3 U.S.-born Filipinos
Qatar	2	Including 2 U.S.-born Qataris
Indonesia	1	Including 1 U.S.-born Indonesian
Iran	1	
Jordan	1	Including 1 U.S.-born Jordanian
South Korea	1	
Asia	30	Including 15 foreign or U.S.-born naturalized players

=== Europe ===
Region	Players	Notes
France	59	Including 8 foreign-born French
Serbia	34	Including 10 foreign-born Serbs
Croatia	24	Including 9 foreign-born Croats
Germany	21	Including 2 U.S.-born Germans
Spain	21	Including 4 foreign-born Spaniards
Lithuania	17	Including 2 U.S.-born Lithuanians
Greece	16	Including 5 foreign-born Greeks
Turkey	16	Including 6 foreign-born Turks
Russia	15	Including 4 foreign-born Russians
United Kingdom	14	Including 3 foreign-born Britons
Italy	14	Including 5 U.S.-born Italians
Slovenia	13	Including 2 foreign-born Slovenes
Georgia	11	Including 6 U.S.-born Georgians
Ukraine	11	Including 2 foreign-born Ukrainians
Montenegro	10	Including 5 foreign-born Montenegrins
Netherlands	9	
Israel (Note: A member of FIBA Europe, geographically a part of Asia.)	8	Including 4 foreign-born Israelis
Bosnia and Herzegovina	7	Including 3 foreign-born Bosnians
Latvia	7	
Poland	6	Including 3 U.S.-born Polish
Czech Republic	5	
North Macedonia	5	Including 4 U.S.-born Macedonians
Bulgaria	2	Including 1 foreign-born Bulgarian
Sweden	4	
Belgium	3	Including 1 foreign-born Belgian
Finland	3	Including 1 foreign-born Finn
Ireland	3	Including 2 U.S.-born Irishmen
Switzerland	3	
Estonia	2	
Austria	1	
Azerbaijan	1	Including 1 U.S.-born Azerbaijani
Belarus	1	Including 1 U.S.-born Belarusian
Cyprus	1	Including 1 U.S.-born Cypriot
Denmark	1	
Hungary	1	
Iceland	1	
Luxembourg	1	
Norway	1	
Portugal	1	
Romania	1	
Slovakia	1	
Europe	370	Including 96 foreign or U.S.-born naturalized players

=== Oceania ===
Region	Players	Notes
Australia	39	Including 6 foreign-born Australians
New Zealand	3	
Australasia	42	Including 6 foreign-born naturalized players

== List ==
Note: This list is correct through the beginning of the 2024–25 season.

Pos	G	Guard	F	Forward	C	Center
Yrs	Players of seasons played in the NBA					
^	Denotes player who has been elected to the Basketball Hall of Fame					
*	Denotes player who is still active in the NBA					

Nationality^{[A]}	Birthplace^{[B]}	Player	Pos.	Career^{[C]}	Yrs	Notes	Ref.
Angola	—	Bruno Fernando	C	2019–2025	6	—	
Argentina	—	Leandro Bolmaro	F/G	2021–2023	2	Also holds Italian citizenship.	
Argentina	—	Nicolás Brussino	G/F	2016–2017	2	Also holds Italian citizenship.	
Argentina	—	Facundo Campazzo	G	2020–2022	3	—	
Argentina	—	Gabriel Deck	G	2021–2022	2	—	
Argentina	—	Carlos Delfino	G	2004–2008; 2009–2014	8	—	
Argentina	—	Patricio Garino	G	2017	1	Also holds Italian citizenship.	
Argentina	—	Manu Ginóbili^	G	2002–2018	16	Also holds Italian citizenship.	
Argentina	—	Walter Herrmann	F	2006–2009	3	—	
Argentina	—	Nicolás Laprovíttola	G	2016	1	—	
Argentina	—	Andrés Nocioni	F	2004–2012	8	—	
Argentina	—	Fabricio Oberto	F	2005–2010	6	—	
Argentina	—	Pablo Prigioni	G	2012–2016	4	—	
Argentina	—	Pepe Sánchez	G	2000–2001; 2002–2003	2	—	
Argentina	—	Luis Scola	F	2007–2017	10	—	
Argentina	—	Luca Vildoza	G	2022	1	Also holds Italian citizenship. Career consists exclusively of playoff games.	
Argentina	—	Rubén Wolkowyski	F	2000–2001; 2002–2003	2	Also holds Polish citizenship.	
Australia	—	David Andersen	F/C	2009–2011	2	Also holds Danish citizenship, but represents Australia internationally.	
Australia	—	Chris Anstey	C	1997–2000	3	—	
Australia	—	Cameron Bairstow	F/C	2014–2016	2	—	
Australia	New Zealand	Aron Baynes	C	2013–2021	9	Born in New Zealand, grew up in Australia, represents Australia internationally.	
Australia	—	Andrew Bogut	C	2005–2018; 2019	14	—	
Australia	—	Jonah Bolden	F	2018–2020	2	—	
Australia	—	Mark Bradtke	C	1996–1997	1	—	
Australia	—	Ryan Broekhoff	G	2018–2020	2	—	
Australia	—	Xavier Cooks	F	2023	1	—	
Australia	—	Mitch Creek	G	2019	1	—	
Australia	—	Dyson Daniels*	G	2022–present	4	—	
Australia	—	Matthew Dellavedova	G	2013–2021; 2022–2023	9	—	
Australia	—	Alex Ducas	G	2024–2025	1	—	
Australia	—	Dante Exum	G	2014–2021; 2023–2026	10	Born in Australia to an American father.	
Australia	—	Johnny Furphy*	F	2024–present	2	—	
Australia	—	Andrew Gaze	G	1994; 1999	2	—	
Australia	—	Josh Giddey*	G	2021–present	5	—	
Australia	—	Josh Green*	G	2020–present	6	—	
Australia	—	Shane Heal	G	1996–1997; 2003	2	—	
Australia	—	Isaac Humphries	F/C	2019	1	—	
Australia	—	Joe Ingles*	F	2014–present	12	—	
Australia	—	Nathan Jawai	F/C	2008–2010	2	The first ever Indigenous Australian to play in the NBA.	
Australia	—	Jock Landale*	C	2021–present	5	—	
Australia	—	Luc Longley	C	1991–2001	10	—	
Australia	—	Will Magnay	C/F	2021	1	—	
Australia	—	Jack McVeigh	F	2024–2025	1	—	
Australia	—	Patty Mills	G	2009–2025	16	—	
Australia	—	Lachlan Olbrich*	F/C	2025–present	1	—	
Australia	—	Tyrese Proctor*	G	2025–present	1	—	
Australia	Sudan (now South Sudan)	Duop Reath*	F/C	2023-present	3	Born in present-day South Sudan, moved to Australia at age 9, became a naturalized Australian citizen, represents Australia internationally.	
Australia	—	Luke Schenscher	C	2006–2007	2	—	
Australia	—	Ben Simmons	F	2017–2025	8	Born in Australia to an American father.	
Australia	—	Luke Travers	F	2024–2026	2	—	
Australia	—	Jack White	F	2022–2024	2	—	
Australia	—	Rocco Zikarsky*	C	2026–present	1	—	
Austria	—	Jakob Poeltl*	C	2016–present	10	—	
Bahamas	—	Deandre Ayton*	C	2018–present	8	—	
Bahamas	—	Dexter Cambridge	F	1992–1993	1	—	
Bahamas	—	V. J. Edgecombe*	G	2025–present	1	—	
Bahamas	—	Buddy Hield*	G	2016–present	10	—	
Bahamas	—	Kai Jones	C	2021–2023; 2024–2025	3	Born in the Bahamas, grew up in the United States.	
Bahamas	—	Ian Lockhart	F	1990	1	—	
Bahamas	—	Mychal Thompson	C/F	1978–1991	12	First player born & raised in the Bahamas to make the NBA	
Belgium	—	Toumani Camara*	F	2023–present	3	—	
Belgium	Zaire (now Democratic Republic of the Congo)	D.J. Mbenga	C	2004–2011	7	Born in Zaire (now the Democratic Republic of the Congo), became a naturalized Belgian citizen, represented Belgium internationally.	
Belgium	—	Ajay Mitchell*	G	2024–present	2	—	
Bosnia and Herzegovina	—	Džanan Musa	F	2018–2020	2	—	
Bosnia and Herzegovina	Republic of Bosnia and Herzegovina	Jusuf Nurkić*	C	2014–present	12	Born when the official name of the country was the Republic of Bosnia and Herzegovina.	
Bosnia and Herzegovina	SFR Yugoslavia (now Montenegro)	Aleksandar Radojević	C	1999–2000; 2004–2005	2	Born in SFR Yugoslavia,^{[D]} represented Bosnia and Herzegovina internationally.	
Bosnia and Herzegovina	SFR Yugoslavia (now Bosnia and Herzegovina)	Mirza Teletović	F	2012–2018	6	Born in SFR Yugoslavia,^{[D]}, represented Bosnia and Herzegovina internationally.	
Bosnia and Herzegovina	SFR Yugoslavia (now Bosnia and Herzegovina)	Ratko Varda	C	2001–2002	1	Born in SFR Yugoslavia,^{[D]}, represented FR Yugoslavia and Bosnia and Herzegovina internationally.	
Brazil	—	Rafael Araújo	C	2004–2007	3	—	
Brazil	—	Leandro Barbosa	G	2003–2017	14	—	
Brazil	—	Bruno Caboclo	F	2014–2021	7	—	
Brazil	—	Vítor Faverani	C	2013–2014	1	—	
Brazil	—	Cristiano Felício	F/C	2015–2021	6	—	
Brazil	—	Rolando Ferreira	C	1988–1989	1	—	
Brazil	—	Alex Garcia	G	2003–2004	2	—	
Brazil	—	Marcelo Huertas	G	2015–2017	2	—	
Brazil	—	Didi Louzada	F	2021–2022	2	—	
Brazil	—	Fab Melo	C	2012–2013	1	—	
Brazil	—	Nenê	F/C	2002–2020	17	—	
Brazil	—	Raul Neto	G	2015–2023	8	—	
Brazil	—	Lucas Nogueira	C	2014–2018	4	—	
Brazil	—	Mãozinha Pereira	F	2024	1	—	
Brazil	—	Gui Santos*	G/F	2023–present	3	—	
Brazil	—	Tiago Splitter	C/F	2010–2017	7	—	
Brazil	—	Anderson Varejão	C/F	2004–2017; 2021	14	—	
Brazil	—	João Vianna	F	1991	1	—	
Brazil	—	Marquinhos Vieira	F	2006–2008	2	—	
British Virgin Islands	—	D'Moi Hodge	G	2023	1	—	
Bulgaria	—	Georgi Glouchkov	F	1985–1986	1	Also holds Italian citizenship. First NBA player from Eastern Europe.	
Bulgaria	Cyprus	Sasha Vezenkov	F	2023–2024	1	Born in Cyprus to Bulgarian parents, grew up in Greece, represents Bulgaria internationally. Has Bulgarian, Greek, and Cypriot citizenship.	
Cameroon	—	Ruben Boumtje-Boumtje	C	2001–2004	3	—	
Cameroon	—	Ulrich Chomche	C	2024–2025	1	—	
Cameroon	—	Christian Koloko	F/C	2022–2023; 2024–2025	3	—	
Cameroon	—	Luc Mbah a Moute	F	2008–2020	12	—	
Cameroon	Belgium	Yves Missi*	C	2024–present	2	Born in Belgium to Cameroonian parents, grew up in Cameroon.	
Cameroon	—	Pascal Siakam*	F	2016–present	10	—	
Canada	—	Kyle Alexander	F/C	2020	1	—	
Canada	—	Nickeil Alexander-Walker*	G	2019–present	7	—	
Canada	—	Joel Anthony	C	2007–2017	10	—	
Canada	—	Norm Baker	G	1946–1947	1	—	
Canada	—	Dalano Banton	G	2021–2026	5	—	
Canada	—	RJ Barrett*	G	2019–present	7	—	
Canada	—	Anthony Bennett	F/C	2013–2017	4	First Canadian drafted #1 overall in the NBA draft. Born in Canada to a Jamaican mother	
Canada	—	Sim Bhullar	C	2015	1	Born in Canada to Indian parents; first player of Indian descent to play in the NBA.	
Canada	Kingdom of Italy (now Italy)	Hank Biasatti	G	1946	1	First international player in the league. Born in the Kingdom of Italy, grew up in Canada, became a naturalized Canadian citizen.	
Canada	—	Khem Birch	C/F	2017–2023	6	—	
Canada	Saint Lucia	Chris Boucher*	F/C	2017–2026	9	Born in Saint Lucia, grew up in Canada, became a naturalized Canadian citizen, represents Canada internationally.	
Canada	—	Oshae Brissett	F/G	2019–2025	6	—	
Canada	—	Dillon Brooks*	G	2017–present	9	—	
Canada	—	Brandon Clarke*	F/C	2019–present	7	—	
Canada	—	Ron Crevier	C	1985	1	—	
Canada	Haiti	Samuel Dalembert	C	2001–2015	14	Born in Haiti, grew up in Canada, became a naturalized Canadian citizen, represented Canada internationally.	
Canada	—	Nate Darling	G	2020–2021	1	—	
Canada	—	Luguentz Dort*	G/F	2019–present	7	Born in Canada to Haitian parents.	
Canada	—	Zach Edey*	C	2024–present	2	—	
Canada	—	Tyler Ennis	G	2014–2018	4	—	
Canada	—	Rick Fox	F/G	1991–2004	13	Born in Canada to Bahamian father and Canadian mother.	
Canada	Switzerland	Kyshawn George*	G	2024–present	2	Born in Switzerland to a Canadian father, represents Canada internationally.	
Canada	—	Shai Gilgeous-Alexander*	G	2018–present	8	Born in Canada to Antiguan mother.	
Canada	—	Stewart Granger	G	1983–1985; 1987	3	—	
Canada	Denmark	Lars Hansen	C	1978–1979	1	Born in Denmark, grew up in Canada, became a naturalized Canadian citizen, represented Canada internationally.	
Canada	—	Bob Houbregs^	C/F	1953–1958	5	Born in Canada, moved to the United States as a child.	
Canada	—	Caleb Houstan*	F	2022–present	4	—	
Canada	—	Cory Joseph	G	2011–2025	14	—	
Canada	—	Kris Joseph	F	2012–2013	1	—	
Canada	—	Mfiondu Kabengele	F	2019–2021; 2022–2023	3	Born in Canada by Congolese parents.	
Canada	—	AJ Lawson*	G	2022–present	4	—	
Canada	—	Trey Lyles	F	2015–2025	10	Born in Canada, moved to the United States at the age of 7 and is also a U.S. citizen. Has represented both the United States and Canada at youth level. Is eligible to represent the United States or Canada internationally.	
Canada	—	Todd MacCulloch	C	1999–2003	4	—	
Canada	—	Jamaal Magloire	C	2000–2012	12	—	
Canada	Senegal	Karim Mané	G	2020–2021	1	Born in Senegal, grew up in Canada.	
Canada	—	Bennedict Mathurin*	G	2022–present	4	—	
Canada	—	Emanuel Miller*	F	2025–present	2	—	
Canada	—	Leonard Miller*	F	2023–present	3	—	
Canada	—	Mychal Mulder	G	2020–2022	3	—	
Canada	—	Jamal Murray*	G	2016–present	10	—	
Canada	South Africa	Steve Nash^	G	1996–2015	18	Born in South Africa to an English father and a Welsh mother, grew up in Canada, became a naturalized Canadian citizen, represented Canada internationally. Also holds a British passport.	
Canada	—	Andrew Nembhard*	G	2022–present	4	—	
Canada	—	Ryan Nembhard*	G	2025–present	1	—	
Canada	—	Andrew Nicholson	F	2012–2017	5	—	
Canada	—	Kelly Olynyk*	C	2013–present	13	—	
Canada	Nigeria	Eugene Omoruyi	F	2021–2024	3	Born in Nigeria, grew up in Canada.	
Canada	—	Kevin Pangos	G	2021–2022	1	Holds both Canadian and Slovenian passports. Represents Canada internationally.	
Canada	—	Dwight Powell*	C/F	2014–present	12	—	
Canada	—	Joshua Primo	G	2021–2024	3	—	
Canada	—	Olivier-Maxence Prosper*	F	2023–present	3	—	
Canada	—	Xavier Rathan-Mayes	G	2018	1	—	
Canada	—	Leo Rautins	F	1983–1984	2	—	
Canada	—	Will Riley*	F	2025–present	1	—	
Canada	—	Jackson Rowe	F	2024–2025	2	—	
Canada	—	Shaedon Sharpe*	G	2022–present	4	—	
Canada	—	Mike Smrek	C	1985–1992	7	—	
Canada	—	Gino Sovran	F/G	1946–1947	1	—	
Canada	—	Nik Stauskas	G	2014–2019; 2022	6	Holds both Canadian and Lithuanian passports. Represented Canada internationally.	
Canada	—	Jahmyl Telfort	G	2025	1	—	
Canada	—	Tristan Thompson	F/C	2011–2025	14	—	
Canada	—	Ernie Vandeweghe	F/G	1949–1956	7	Born in Canada, moved to the United States as a teenager, became a naturalized U.S. citizen.	
Canada	—	Bill Wennington	C	1985–1991; 1993–2000	13	—	
Canada	—	Andrew Wiggins*	G/F	2014–present	12	Born in Canada to an American father and a naturalized Canadian mother, who was born in Barbados.	
Canada	—	Lindell Wigginton	G	2022–2023	3	—	
Canada	—	Jim Zoet	C	1982	1	—	
Cape Verde	—	Edy Tavares	C	2015–2017	2	—	
China	—	Cui Yongxi	G	2024	1	—	
China	—	Mengke Bateer	C	2002–2003	3	—	
China	—	Sun Yue	G	2008–2009	1	—	
China	—	Wang Zhizhi	C	2001–2005	5	—	
China	—	Yang Hansen*	C	2025–present	1	—	
China	—	Yao Ming^	C	2002–2011	8	—	
China	—	Yi Jianlian	F	2007–2012	5	—	
China	—	Zhou Qi	C	2017–2018	2	—	
Colombia	—	Jaime Echenique	C	2021	1	—	
Croatia	Germany	Dalibor Bagarić	C	2000–2003	3	Born in West Germany,^{[G]} represented Croatia internationally.	
Croatia	Bosnia and Herzegovina	Dragan Bender	F/C	2016–2020	4	Born in Bosnia and Herzegovina, represents Croatia internationally.	
Croatia	SFR Yugoslavia (now Bosnia and Herzegovina)	Bojan Bogdanović	F	2014–2025	11	Born in SFR Yugoslavia,^{[D]} represents Croatia internationally.	
Croatia	—	Duje Dukan	F	2016	1	Born in Croatia, moved to the United States at the age of 10 months and is also U.S. citizen. Represents Croatia internationally.	
Croatia	SFR Yugoslavia (now Croatia)	Gordan Giriček	G/F	2002–2008	6	Born in SFR Yugoslavia,^{[D]} represented Croatia internationally.	
Croatia	—	Mario Hezonja	G/F	2015–2020	5	—	
Croatia	SFR Yugoslavia (now Croatia)	Mario Kasun	C	2004–2006	2	Born in SFR Yugoslavia,^{[D]} represented Croatia internationally.	
Croatia	SFR Yugoslavia (now Croatia)	Toni Kukoč^	F	1993–2006	13	Born in SFR Yugoslavia,^{[D]} represented SFR Yugoslavia and Croatia internationally.	
Croatia	SFR Yugoslavia (now Bosnia and Herzegovina)	Damir Markota	C	2006–2007	1	Born in SFR Yugoslavia,^{[D]} grew up in Sweden, represented Croatia internationally.	
Croatia	Bosnia and Herzegovina	Karlo Matković*	F/C	2024–present	2	Born in Bosnia and Herzegovina, represents Croatia internationally.	
Croatia	SFR Yugoslavia (now Croatia)	Dražen Petrović^	G	1989–1993	4	Born in SFR Yugoslavia,^{[D]} represented SFR Yugoslavia and Croatia internationally until his death in 1993.	
Croatia	SFR Yugoslavia (now Bosnia and Herzegovina}	Zoran Planinić	G	2003–2006	3	Born in SFR Yugoslavia,^{[D]} represented Croatia internationally.	
Croatia	SFR Yugoslavia (now Croatia)	Dino Rađa^	F/C	1993–1997	4	Born in SFR Yugoslavia,^{[D]} represented SFR Yugoslavia and Croatia internationally.	
Croatia	SFR Yugoslavia (now Croatia)	Damjan Rudež	F	2014–2017	3	Born in SFR Yugoslavia,^{[D]} represented Croatia internationally.	
Croatia	—	Luka Šamanić	F	2019–2021; 2023–2024	4	—	
Croatia	—	Dario Šarić	F	2016–present	10	—	
Croatia	SFR Yugoslavia (now Croatia)	Bruno Šundov	C	1998–2005	7	Born in SFR Yugoslavia,^{[D]} represented Croatia internationally.	
Croatia	SFR Yugoslavia (now Croatia)	Žan Tabak	C	1994–1998; 1999–2001	6	Born in SFR Yugoslavia,^{[D]} represented SFR Yugoslavia and Croatia internationally.	
Croatia	SFR Yugoslavia (now Croatia)	Roko Ukić	G	2008–2010	2	Born in SFR Yugoslavia,^{[D]} represented Croatia internationally.	
Croatia	SFR Yugoslavia (now Croatia)	Stojko Vranković	C	1990–1992; 1996–1999	5	Born in SFR Yugoslavia,^{[D]} represented SFR Yugoslavia and Croatia internationally.	
Croatia	—	Ante Žižić	C	2017–2020	3	—	
Croatia	Republic of Bosnia and Herzegovina	Ivica Zubac*	C	2016–present	10	Born in the Republic of Bosnia and Herzegovina, represents Croatia internationally.	
Cuba	—	Lazaro Borrell	F	1999–2000	1	—	
Cuba	—	Andrés Guibert	F/C	1994–1995	2	Born in Cuba, defected to Puerto Rico in 1993.	
Czech Republic	—	Vít Krejčí*	G	2021–present	5	—	
Czech Republic	Czechoslovakia (now Czech Republic)	Tomáš Satoranský	G	2016–2022	6	Born in Czechoslovakia,^{[E]} represents Czech Republic internationally.	
Czech Republic	Czechoslovakia (now Czech Republic)	Jan Veselý	F	2011–2014	3	Born in Czechoslovakia,^{[E]} represents Czech Republic internationally.	
Czech Republic	Czechoslovakia (now Czech Republic)	Jiří Welsch	G	2002–2006	4	Born in Czechoslovakia,^{[E]} represented Czech Republic internationally.	
Czech Republic	Czechoslovakia (now Czech Republic)	George Zídek	C	1995–1998	3	Born in Czechoslovakia,^{[E]} represented Czech Republic internationally. Known in Europe as Jiří Zidek Jr.	
Democratic Republic of the Congo	Zaire (now Democratic Republic of the Congo)	Bismack Biyombo*	C	2011–present	15	Born in Zaire.	
Democratic Republic of the Congo	Zaire (now Democratic Republic of the Congo)	Christian Eyenga	G/F	2010–2012	2	Born in Zaire.	
Democratic Republic of the Congo	—	Jonathan Kuminga*	F	2021–present	5	—	
Democratic Republic of the Congo	Zaire (now Democratic Republic of the Congo)	Emmanuel Mudiay	F	2015–2020; 2022	6	Born in Zaire.	
Democratic Republic of the Congo	—	Dikembe Mutombo^	C	1991–2009	18	Born in the original Democratic Republic of the Congo, raised in Zaire throughout most of its existence.	
Democratic Republic of the Congo	—	Oscar Tshiebwe*	C	2023–present	3	—	
Denmark	—	Gabriel Lundberg	G	2022	1	—	
Dominica	—	Garth Joseph	C	2000–2001	1	—	
Dominican Republic	—	Ángel Delgado	C	2018–2019	1	—	
Dominican Republic	—	Chris Duarte	G	2021–2025	4	Born & raised in the Dominican Republic, father is Canadian.	
Dominican Republic	—	Luis Flores	G	2004–2005	1	—	
Dominican Republic	—	Andersson Garcia	F/G	2026–present	1	—	
Dominican Republic	—	Francisco García	F/G	2005–2014	10	—	
Dominican Republic	—	Al Horford*	C	2007–present	19	—	
Dominican Republic	—	Tito Horford	C	1988–1990; 1993	3	—	
Dominican Republic	—	David Jones-Garcia*	G	2025–present	1	—	
Dominican Republic	—	Felipe López	G	1998–2002	4	—	
Dominican Republic	—	Luis Montero	G	2015–2016; 2017–2018	2	—	
Egypt	—	Alaa Abdelnaby	F/C	1990–1995	5	Born in Egypt, moved to the United States at the age of 2 and is also U.S. citizen.	
Egypt	—	Abdel Nader	F/G	2017–2022	5	Born in Egypt, moved to the United States at the age of 3 and is also U.S. citizen.	
Estonia	—	Henri Drell	F	2024	1	—	
Estonia	—	Martin Müürsepp	F	1996–1998	2	Born in the Estonian SSR,^{[I]} represented Estonia internationally.	
Finland	—	Lauri Markkanen*	F/C	2017–present	9	—	
Finland	—	Hanno Möttölä	C	2000–2002	2	—	
Finland	France	Erik Murphy	C	2013–2014	1	Born in France to an American father and Finnish mother. Holds both American and Finnish passports. Represents Finland internationally.	
France	—	Tariq Abdul-Wahad (formerly Olivier Saint-Jean)	F	1997–2003	6	—	
France	—	Alexis Ajinça	F	2008–2011; 2013–2018	7	—	
France	—	Joël Ayayi	G	2021–2022	1	Born in France by Beninese parents	
France	—	Adama Bal*	F	2026–present	1	—	
France	—	Nicolas Batum*	G	2008–present	18	—	
France	Guadeloupe	Rodrigue Beaubois	G	2009–2013	4	Born in Guadeloupe, an overseas region of France in the Caribbean.	
France	—	Joan Beringer*	C	2025–present	1	—	
France	—	Malcolm Cazalon	G	2023	1	—	
France	—	Sidy Cissoko*	F	2023–present	3	—	
France	—	Petr Cornelie	F	2021–2022	1	Born in France to a Czech mother and a French father.	
France	—	Bilal Coulibaly*	F	2023–present	3	—	
France	—	Pacôme Dadiet*	G	2024–present	2	—	
France	—	Nando De Colo	G	2012–2014	2	—	
France	—	Moussa Diabaté*	F	2022–present	4	Born in France to Malian and Guinean parents.	
France	—	Boris Diaw	F/C	2003–2017	14	—	
France	—	Mohamed Diawara*	F	2025–present	1	—	
France	—	Yakhouba Diawara	F	2006–2010	4	—	
France	—	Ousmane Dieng*	G	2022–present	4	—	
France	Guinea	Sekou Doumbouya	F	2019–2022	3	Born in Guinea, grew up in France.	
France	—	Noa Essengue*	F	2025–present	1	—	
France	—	Evan Fournier	G/F	2012–2024	12	Born in France by an Algerian mother.	
France	Guadeloupe	Mickaël Gelabale	F	2006–2008; 2013	3	Born in Guadeloupe, an overseas region of France in the Caribbean.	
France	—	Rudy Gobert*	C	2013–present	13	—	
France	—	Jaylen Hoard	SF	2019–2022	3	Born in France by American father.	
France	—	William Howard	F	2019–2020	1	—	
France	French Guiana	Damien Inglis	F	2015–2016	1	Born in French Guiana, an overseas region of France in South America.	
France	—	Joffrey Lauvergne	F/C	2015–2018	4	—	
France	—	Timothé Luwawu-Cabarrot	G/F	2016–2022	6	—	
France	—	Ian Mahinmi	C	2007–2020	12	—	
France	—	Théo Maledon	G	2020–2024	4	—	
France	—	Jérôme Moïso	F	2000–2005	5	—	
France	—	Adam Mokoka	G	2019–2021	2	—	
France	Belgium	Frank Ntilikina	G	2017–2024	7	Born in Belgium to Rwandan parents, grew up in France, represents France internationally.	
France	—	Élie Okobo	G	2018–2020	2	Born in France to a Congolese father and a French mother.	
France	Belgium	Tony Parker^	G	2001–2019	18	Born in Belgium to an American father and a Dutch mother, grew up in France, represented France internationally.	
France	—	Noah Penda*	C	2025–present	1	—	
France	—	Johan Petro	C	2005–2013	8	—	
France	Guadeloupe	Mickaël Piétrus	G/F	2003–2013	10	Born in Guadeloupe, an overseas region of France in the Caribbean.	
France	—	Vincent Poirier	C	2019–2021	2	—	
France	Haiti	Yves Pons	F	2021–2022	1	Born in Haiti, grew up in France, represents France internationally.	
France	—	Maxime Raynaud*	C	2025–present	1	—	
France	—	Antoine Rigaudeau	G	2003	1	—	
France	Spain	Zaccharie Risacher*	F	2024–present	2	Born in Spain to French parents, represents France internationally.	
France	—	Rayan Rupert*	G	2023–present	3	—	
France	—	Tidjane Salaün*	F	2024–present	2	—	
France	—	Alex Sarr*	C/F	2024–present	2	Brothers born in France of Senegalese descent.	
France	—	Olivier Sarr	C	2021–2024	3	Brothers born in France of Senegalese descent.	
France	French Guiana	Kevin Séraphin	F	2010–2017	7	Born in French Guiana, an overseas region of France in South America.	
France	—	Pape Sy	F/G	2010–2011	1	—	
France	—	Killian Tillie	F/C	2020–2022	2	—	
France	—	Axel Toupane	F/G	2016–2017; 2021	3	—	
France	—	Armel Traoré	F	2024–2025	1	—	
France	—	Nolan Traoré*	G	2025–present	1	—	
France	Martinique	Ronny Turiaf	F	2006–2014	10	Born in Martinique, an overseas region of France in the Caribbean.	
France	—	Victor Wembanyama*	F/C	2023–present	3	First Frenchman drafted #1 overall in the NBA draft.	
France	—	Guerschon Yabusele*	F	2017–2019; 2024–present	4	—	
Gabon	—	Stéphane Lasme	F	2007–2008	1	—	
Gabon	—	Chris Silva	F	2019–2023	4	—	
Georgia	—	Goga Bitadze*	C	2019–present	7	—	
Georgia	Soviet Union (now Georgia)	Zaza Pachulia	C	2003–2019	16	Born in the Soviet Union,^{[F]} represented Georgia internationally. Also holds a Turkish passport.	
Georgia	—	Tornike Shengelia	F	2012–2014	2	—	
Georgia	Soviet Union (now Georgia)	Vladimir Stepania	C	1998–2004	6	Born in the Soviet Union.^{[F]}	
Georgia	Soviet Union (now Georgia)	Nikoloz Tskitishvili	F	2002–2006	4	Born in the Soviet Union,^{[F]} represented Georgia internationally.	
Germany	—	Christian Anderson Jr.*	G	2026-present		Born in the United States, represents Germany internationally.	
Germany	—	Uwe Blab	C	1985–1990	5	Born in West Germany.^{[G]}	
Germany	—	Isaac Bonga	G	2018–2022	4	—	
Germany	—	Shawn Bradley	C	1993–2005	12	Born in West Germany^{[G]} to American parents, grew up in the United States, represented Germany internationally.	
Germany	—	Tristan da Silva*	F	2024–present	2	Born in Germany to a Brazilian father and a German mother; also has Brazilian citizenship. Represents Germany internationally.	
Germany	—	Frido Frey	F	1946–1947	1	Born in the Weimar Republic,^{[G]} grew up in the U.S.	
Germany	—	Elias Harris	F	2013	1	Born in West Germany.^{[G]}	
Germany	—	Charlie Hoefer	F	1946–1948	2	Born in the Weimar Republic,^{[G]} grew up in the U.S.	
Germany	—	Ariel Hukporti*	C	2024–present	2	Born in Germany to Togolese parents; also has Togolese citizenship.	
Germany	—	Maxi Kleber*	F	2017–present	9	—	
Germany	—	Dirk Nowitzki^	F	1998–2019	21	Born in West Germany.^{[G]}	
Germany	—	Tim Ohlbrecht	F/C	2013	1	Born in West Germany.^{[G]}	
Germany	—	Tibor Pleiß	C	2015–2016	1	Born in West Germany.^{[G]}	
Germany	—	Detlef Schrempf	F/C	1985–2001	16	Born in West Germany.^{[G]}	
Germany	—	Dennis Schröder*	G	2013–present	13	Born in Germany to Gambian mother.	
Germany	—	Daniel Theis	F/C	2017–2025	8	—	
Germany	—	Franz Wagner*	F	2021–present	5	—	
Germany	—	Moritz Wagner*	F/C	2018–present	8	—	
Germany	—	Chris Welp	C	1987–1990	3	Born in West Germany.^{[G]}	
Germany	—	Paul Zipser	G/F	2016–2018	2	—	
Ghana	—	Ben Bentil	F	2017	1	—	
Ghana	—	Amida Brimah	C	2021	1	—	
Ghana	—	Nathan Mensah	F/C	2023–2024	1	—	
Great Britain; England	—	OG Anunoby*	F	2017–present	9	Born in England to Nigerian parents. Moved to the U.S. when he was four years old and learned to play basketball there.	
Great Britain; Scotland	—	Robert Archibald	F	2002–2004	2	—	
Great Britain; England	—	Steve Bucknall	G	1989–1990	1	First British player who learned to play basketball in the U.K.	
Great Britain; England	Sudan (now South Sudan)	Luol Deng	F	2004–2019	15	Born in Sudan (now South Sudan),^{[H]} grew up in England, became a naturalized British citizen, represented England and Great Britain internationally.	
Great Britain; England	—	James Donaldson	C	1980–1993; 1995	14	Born in England, grew up in the United States.	
Great Britain; England	—	Ndudi Ebi	F	2003–2005	2	Born in England to Nigerian parents, grew up in the United States.	
Great Britain; England	—	Tosan Evbuomwan*	F	2024–present	3	—	
Great Britain; England	—	Joel Freeland	C	2012–2015	3	—	
Great Britain; England	—	Ben Gordon	G	2004–2015	11	Born in England to Jamaican parents, grew up in the United States, represented Great Britain internationally.	
Great Britain; England	—	Chris Harris	G	1955–1956	1	Moved from Southampton, England to the U.S. when he was young.	
Great Britain; England	—	Pops Mensah-Bonsu	F	2006–2007; 2009–2011	4	Born in England to Ghanaian parents, represented Great Britain internationally.	
Great Britain; England	—	Amari Williams*	C	2025–present	1	—	
Greece	—	Alex Antetokounmpo*	F	2026–present	1	Born in Greece to Nigerian parents, became a Greek citizen in September 2021.	
Greece	—	Giannis Antetokounmpo*	F	2013–present	13	Born in Greece to Nigerian parents, became a Greek citizen in May 2013. Represents Greece internationally.	
Greece	—	Kostas Antetokounmpo	F	2018–2021	3	Born in Greece to Nigerian parents, became a Greek citizen in May 2016. Represents Greece internationally.	
Greece	—	Thanasis Antetokounmpo*	F	2016; 2019–2024; 2025–present	7	Born in Greece to Nigerian parents, became a Greek citizen in May 2013. Represents Greece internationally.	
Greece	—	Antonis Fotsis	F	2001–2002	1	—	
Greece	—	Andreas Glyniadakis	C	2006–2007	1	—	
Greece	—	Georgios Kalaitzakis	G/F	2021–2022	1	—	
Greece	Canada	Naz Mitrou-Long	G	2017–2020	3	Born in Canada to Greek mother, represents Greece internationally.	
Greece	—	Georgios Papagiannis	C	2016–2018	2	—	
Greece	—	Kostas Papanikolaou	F	2014–2016	2	—	
Greece	—	Efthimios Rentzias	C	2002–2003	1	—	
Greece	—	Vassilis Spanoulis	G	2006–2007	1	—	
Greece	Soviet Union (now Georgia)	Jake Tsakalidis	C	2000–2007	7	Born in Soviet Union (now Georgia),^{[F]} represented Greece internationally.	
Guinea	—	Moussa Cissé*	C	2025–present	1	—	
Guinea	—	Mamadi Diakite	F	2020–2024	4	—	
Guyana	—	Rawle Marshall	G/F	2005–2007	2	—	
Guyana	—	Jason Miskiri	G	1999	1	—	
Haiti	—	Yvon Joseph	C	1985	1	—	
Haiti	—	Skal Labissière	C	2016–2020; 2025–2026	6	—	
Haiti	—	Olden Polynice	C/F	1987–2001; 2003–2004	15	Born in Haiti, grew up in the United States.	
Hungary	—	Kornél Dávid	F	1999–2001	3	—	
Iceland	—	Pétur Guðmundsson	C	1981–1982; 1986–1989	5	First European NBA player who took up the game while growing up in his own homeland.	
Iran	—	Hamed Haddadi	C	2008–2013	5	—	
Ireland	—	Pat Burke	C/F	2002–2003; 2005–2007	3	—	
Israel	—	Deni Avdija*	F	2020–present	6	Born in Israel by Serbian father.	
Israel	—	Omri Casspi	F	2009–2019	10	—	
Israel	—	T. J. Leaf	F	2017–2021	4	Born in Israel to American-born/ Israeli-naturalized parents, previously represented the United States at youth level, represents Israel internationally.	
Israel	—	Gal Mekel	G	2013–2014	2	—	
Israel	South Africa	Ben Saraf*	G	2025–present	1	Born in South Africa to Israeli parents, raised in Israel, represents Israel internationally.	
Italy	—	Andrea Bargnani	F	2006–2016	10	First European drafted #1 overall in the NBA draft	
Italy	—	Marco Belinelli	G	2007–2020	13	—	
Italy	—	Gigi Datome	F	2013–2015	2	—	
Italy	—	Vincenzo Esposito	G	1995–1996	1	—	
Italy	—	Simone Fontecchio*	F	2022–present	4	—	
Italy	—	Danilo Gallinari	F	2008–2024	16	—	
Italy	—	Nico Mannion	G	2020–2021	1	Born in Italy to an Italian mother and an American father.	
Italy	—	Nicolò Melli	F	2019–2021	2	Born in Italy to an Italian father and an American mother.	
Italy	—	Stefano Rusconi	C/F	1995–1996	1	—	
Jamaica	—	Omari Johnson	F	2018	1	Born in Jamaica to American parents.	
Jamaica	—	Jerome Jordan	C	2011–2012; 2014–2015	2	—	
Jamaica	—	Nick Richards*	C	2020–present	6	—	
Jamaica	—	Rumeal Robinson	G	1990–1994; 1996-1997	6	—	
Jamaica	—	Samardo Samuels	F	2010–2013	3	—	
Jamaica	—	Wayne Sappleton	F	1984–1985	1	—	
Japan	—	Rui Hachimura*	F	2019–present	7	Born in Japan by Japanese mother and Beninese father.	
Japan	—	Yuki Kawamura*	G	2024–present	2	—	
Japan	—	Yuta Tabuse	G	2004	1	—	
Japan	—	Yuta Watanabe	F	2018–2024	6	—	
Latvia	—	Dairis Bertāns	G	2019	1	Born in the Latvian SSR,^{[I]} represents Latvia internationally.	
Latvia	—	Dāvis Bertāns	F	2016–2024	8	—	
Latvia	—	Andris Biedriņš	C	2004–2014	10	Born in the Latvian SSR,^{[I]} represented Latvia internationally.	
Latvia	—	Rodions Kurucs	F	2018–2021	3	—	
Latvia	—	Anžejs Pasečņiks	C	2019–2021	2	—	
Latvia	—	Kristaps Porziņģis*	F/C	2015–present	11	—	
Latvia	—	Gundars Vētra	F	1992–1993	1	Born in the Latvian SSR,^{[I]} represented the Soviet Union internationally.	
Lebanon	Antigua and Barbuda	Norvel Pelle	F	2019–2022	3	Born in Antigua and Barbuda, he moved to the U.S. Virgin Islands and later to the US, became a naturalized Lebanese citizen, represents Lebanon internationally. He also holds U.S. citizenship.	
Lebanon	—	Rony Seikaly	C	1988–1999	11	Born in Lebanon, initially represented the United States internationally. before receiving special permission from FIBA to switch to representing the Lebanese national team later in his career.	
Lithuania	—	Martynas Andriuškevičius	C	2005–2007	1	Born in the Lithuanian SSR,^{[I]} represented Lithuania internationally.	
Lithuania	—	Ignas Brazdeikis	F	2019–2022	3	Also has Canadian citizenship. Represented Canada in youth tournaments, then received FIBA confirmation to switch to playing for Lithuania's senior team.	
Lithuania	—	Zydrunas Ilgauskas	C	1996–2011	13	Born in the Lithuanian SSR,^{[I]} represented Lithuania internationally.	
Lithuania	—	Kasparas Jakučionis*	G	2025–present	1	—	
Lithuania	—	Šarūnas Jasikevičius	G	2005–2007	2	Born in the Lithuanian SSR,^{[I]} represented Lithuania internationally.	
Lithuania	—	Linas Kleiza	F	2005–2009; 2010–2013	7	Born in the Lithuanian SSR,^{[I]} represented Lithuania internationally.	
Lithuania	—	Arnoldas Kulboka	F	2021–2022	1	—	
Lithuania	—	Mindaugas Kuzminskas	F	2016–2017	2	Born in the Lithuanian SSR,^{[I]} represents Lithuania internationally.	
Lithuania	—	Arvydas Macijauskas	G	2005–2006	1	Born in the Lithuanian SSR,^{[I]} represented Lithuania internationally.	
Lithuania	—	Šarūnas Marčiulionis^	G	1989–1997	8	Born in the Lithuanian SSR,^{[I]} represented the Soviet Union and Lithuania internationally.	
Lithuania	—	Donatas Motiejūnas	F/C	2012–2017; 2019	6	—	
Lithuania	—	Arvydas Sabonis^	C	1995–2001; 2002–2003	7	Born in the Lithuanian SSR,^{[I]} represented the Soviet Union and Lithuania internationally.	
Lithuania	—	Deividas Sirvydis	G/F	2020–2021	1	—	
Lithuania	—	Darius Songaila	F	2003–2011	8	Born in the Lithuanian SSR,^{[I]} represented Lithuania internationally.	
Lithuania	—	Jonas Valančiūnas*	C	2012–present	14	—	
Luxembourg	—	Alvin Jones	F	2001–2002	1	Born in Luxembourg to an American father and Luxembourgish mother.	
Mali	—	N'Faly Dante	C	2025–2027	2	—	
Mali	—	Cheick Diallo	F	2016–2020; 2021–2022	5	—	
Mali	—	Soumaila Samake	C	2000–2001; 2002	2	—	
Mali	—	Adama Sanogo	F/C	2023–2025	2	—	
Mexico	—	Gustavo Ayón	F	2011–2014	3	—	
Mexico	—	Jorge Gutiérrez	G	2014–2015; 2016	3	—	
Mexico	—	Horacio Llamas	C	1997–1998	2	—	
Mexico	—	Karim López*	F	2026–present		—	
Mexico	—	Eduardo Nájera	F	2000–2012	12	—	
Montenegro	SFR Yugoslavia (now Serbia)	Žarko Čabarkapa	F	2003–2006	3	Born in SFR Yugoslavia,^{[D]} represented FR Yugoslavia, Serbia and Montenegro, and Montenegro internationally.	
Montenegro	SFR Yugoslavia (now Montenegro)	Predrag Drobnjak	C	2001–2005	4	Born in SFR Yugoslavia,^{[D]} represented FR Yugoslavia, Serbia and Montenegro, and Montenegro internationally.	
Montenegro	SFR Yugoslavia (now Montenegro)	Nikola Peković	C	2010–2017	6	Born in SFR Yugoslavia,^{[D]} represented Serbia and Montenegro and Montenegro internationally.	
Montenegro	SFR Yugoslavia (now Croatia)	Predrag Savović	G	2002–2003	1	Born in SFR Yugoslavia.^{[D]} Also has Spanish citizenship.	
Montenegro	FR Yugoslavia (now Montenegro)	Marko Simonović	F/C	2021–2023	2	Born in FR Yugoslavia,^{[D]} represents Montenegro internationally.	
Montenegro	SFR Yugoslavia (now Montenegro)	Slavko Vraneš	C	2004	1	Born in SFR Yugoslavia,^{[D]} represented Montenegro internationally.	
Montenegro	Switzerland	Nikola Vučević*	C	2011–present	15	Born in Switzerland to Montenegrin parents, grew up in Belgium, represents Montenegro internationally.	
Netherlands	—	Jesse Edwards	C	2025	1	—	
Netherlands	—	Francisco Elson	C	2003–2012	9	—	
Netherlands	—	Tristan Enaruna*	F	2026–present	1	—	
Netherlands	—	Dan Gadzuric	C	2002–2011; 2012	10	—	
Netherlands	—	Geert Hammink	C	1994–1996	3	—	
Netherlands	—	Malevy Leons*	F/C	2024–present	2	—	
Netherlands	—	Swen Nater	C	1976–1984	8	Born in the Netherlands, moved to the United States at the age of 9.	
Netherlands	—	Quinten Post*	C	2024–present	2	—	
Netherlands	—	Rik Smits	C	1988–2000	12	—	
New Zealand	—	Steven Adams*	C	2013–present	13	—	
New Zealand	—	Sean Marks	F/C	1998–2000; 2001–2003; 2004–2011	11	—	
New Zealand	—	Kirk Penney	G	2003–2005	2	—	
Nicaragua	—	Norchad Omier*	F	2026–present	1	—	
Nigeria	—	Precious Achiuwa*	F	2020–present	6	—	
Nigeria	—	Solomon Alabi	C	2010–2012	2	—	
Nigeria	—	Peter Aluma	C	1999	1	—	
Nigeria	Great Britain; England	Kelenna Azubuike	G	2007–2011; 2012	5	Born in England to Nigerian parents, grew up in the United States, does not hold British citizenship.	
Nigeria	—	Udoka Azubuike	C	2020–2024	4	—	
Nigeria	—	Charles Bassey*	F	2021–present	5	—	
Nigeria	—	Yinka Dare	C	1994–1998	4	—	
Nigeria	—	Obinna Ekezie	F/C	1999–2002; 2005	4	—	
Nigeria	—	Festus Ezeli	C	2012–2017	5	—	
Nigeria	—	Chima Moneke	F	2022	1	—	
Nigeria	—	Julius Nwosu	C	1994–1995	1	—	
Nigeria	—	Josh Okogie*	F	2018–present	8	Born in Nigeria, became a naturalized U.S. citizen and represented U.S. youth before representing Nigeria internationally.	
Nigeria	—	Michael Olowokandi	C	1998–2007	9	Born in Nigeria, grew up in England.	
Nigeria	—	Olumide Oyedeji	C	2000–2003	3	—	
North Macedonia	SFR Yugoslavia (now North Macedonia)	Pero Antić	F/C	2013–2015	2	Born in SFR Yugoslavia,^{[D]} represented North Macedonia internationally.	
Norway	—	Torgeir Bryn	C	1989	1	—	
Panama	—	Gary Forbes	F	2010–2012	2	—	
Panama	—	Rubén Garcés	F	2000–2001	1	—	
Panama	—	Stuart Gray	C/F	1984–1991	7	Born in the Panama Canal Zone (which was controlled by the United States), represented Panama internationally.	
Poland	—	Marcin Gortat	C/F	2007–2019	12	—	
Poland	—	Maciej Lampe	F/C	2003–2006	3	Born in Poland, grew up in Sweden, represented Poland internationally.	
Poland	—	Cezary Trybański	C	2002–2004	2	—	
Portugal	—	Neemias Queta*	C	2021–present	5	Born in Portugal to Bissau-Guinean parents.	
Puerto Rico	—	Carlos Arroyo	G	2001–2008; 2009–2011	9	—	
Puerto Rico	—	J. J. Barea	G	2006–2020	14	—	
Puerto Rico	—	Gian Clavell	G	2017	1	—	
Puerto Rico	—	Guillermo Díaz	G	2008	1	—	
Puerto Rico	—	Butch Lee	G	1978–1980	2	Born in Puerto Rico but moved to the U.S. as a child. Represented Puerto Rico as a player and coach.	
Puerto Rico	—	José Ortiz	F	1988–1990	2	—	
Puerto Rico	—	Peter John Ramos	C	2004–2005	1	—	
Puerto Rico	—	Ramón Rivas	F/C	1988–1989	1	—	
Romania	—	Gheorghe Mureșan	C	1993–1997; 1999–2000	6	—	
Russia	Soviet Union (now Russia)	Sergei Bazarevich	G	1994–1995	1	Born in the Soviet Union,^{[F]} represented the Soviet Union and Russia internationally.	
Russia	Ukraine	Joel Bolomboy	F/C	2016–2018	2	Born in Ukraine to a Congolese father and a Russian mother, represented Russia internationally	
Russia	—	Egor Dëmin*	G	2025–present	1	—	
Russia	—	Vladislav Goldin*	C	2025–present	1	—	
Russia	—	Sergey Karasev	G/F	2013–2016	3	—	
Russia	Soviet Union (now Russia)	Sasha Kaun	C	2015–2016	1	Born in the Soviet Union,^{[F]} represents Russia internationally.	
Russia	Soviet Union (now Ukraine)	Viktor Khryapa	F	2004–2008	4	Born in the Soviet Union,^{[F]} represented Russia internationally.	
Russia	Soviet Union (now Russia)	Andrei Kirilenko	F	2001–2011; 2012–2015	13	Born in the Soviet Union,^{[F]} represented Russia internationally. He also holds U.S. citizenship since 2010.	
Russia	Soviet Union (now Russia)	Yaroslav Korolev	F	2005–2007	2	Born in the Soviet Union.^{[F]}	
Russia	Soviet Union (now Russia)	Sergei Monia	F	2005–2006	1	Born in the Soviet Union,^{[F]} represented Russia internationally.	
Russia	Soviet Union (now Russia)	Timofey Mozgov	F	2010–2018	8	Born in the Soviet Union,^{[F]} represented Russia internationally.	
Russia	Soviet Union (now Russia)	Pavel Podkolzin	C	2004–2006	2	Born in the Soviet Union,^{[F]} represented Russia internationally.	
Russia	Soviet Union (now Russia)	Alexey Shved	G	2012–2015	3	Born in the Soviet Union,^{[F]} represents Russia internationally.	
Senegal	—	Ibou Badji	C	2023–2024	1	—	
Senegal	—	Gorgui Dieng	C	2013–2023	10	—	
Senegal	—	DeSagana Diop	C	2001–2013	12	—	
Senegal	—	Tacko Fall	C	2019–2022	3	—	
Senegal	—	Mouhamed Gueye*	F	2023–present	3	—	
Senegal	—	Hamady N'Diaye	C	2010–2012; 2013–2014	3	—	
Senegal	—	Makhtar N'Diaye	F	1999	1	—	
Senegal	—	Mamadou N'Diaye	C	2000–2005	5	—	
Senegal	—	Boniface N'Dong	C	2005–2006	1	Also has German citizenship.	
Senegal	—	Maurice Ndour	F	2016–2017	1	—	
Senegal	—	Cheikh Samb	C	2007–2009	2	—	
Senegal	—	Mouhamed Sene	F	2006–2009	3	—	
Senegal	—	Pape Sow	F	2004–2007	3	—	
Serbia	SFR Yugoslavia (now Serbia)	Miloš Babić	C/F	1990–1991	2	Born in SFR Yugoslavia.^{[D]}	
Serbia	SFR Yugoslavia (now Serbia)	Nemanja Bjelica	F	2015–2022	7	Born in SFR Yugoslavia,^{[D]} represents Serbia internationally.	
Serbia	(Federal Republic of Yugoslavia) FR Yugoslavia (now Serbia)	Bogdan Bogdanović*	G	2017–present	9	Born in FR Yugoslavia,^{[D]} represents Serbia internationally.	
Serbia	SFR Yugoslavia (now Serbia)	Radisav Ćurčić	C	1992–1993	1	Born in SFR Yugoslavia,^{[D]} represented SFR Yugoslavia internationally.	
Serbia	SFR Yugoslavia (now Serbia)	Rastko Cvetković	C	1995–1996	1	Born in SFR Yugoslavia,^{[D]} represented SFR Yugoslavia internationally.	
Serbia	SFR Yugoslavia (now Bosnia and Herzegovina)	Sasha Danilović	G	1995–1997	2	Born in SFR Yugoslavia,^{[D]} represented SFR Yugoslavia and FR Yugoslavia internationally.	
Serbia	SFR Yugoslavia (now Serbia)	Vlade Divac^	C	1989–2005	16	Born in SFR Yugoslavia,^{[D]} represented SFR Yugoslavia and FR Yugoslavia internationally.	
Serbia	SFR Yugoslavia (now Serbia)	Aleksandar Djordjevic	G	1996	1	Born in SFR Yugoslavia,^{[D]} represented SFR Yugoslavia and FR Yugoslavia internationally.	
Serbia	FR Yugoslavia (now Serbia)	Marko Gudurić	G/F	2019–2020	1	Born in FR Yugoslavia,^{[D]} represents Serbia internationally.	
Serbia	SFR Yugoslavia (now Bosnia and Herzegovina)	Mile Ilić	C	2006–2007	1	Born in SFR Yugoslavia,^{[D]} represented Serbia and Montenegro internationally.	
Serbia	SFR Yugoslavia (now Serbia)	Marko Jarić	G	2002–2009	7	Born in SFR Yugoslavia,^{[D]} represented FR Yugoslavia, Serbia and Montenegro, and Serbia internationally.	
Serbia	FR Yugoslavia (now Serbia)	Nikola Jokić*	C	2015–present	11	Born in FR Yugoslavia,^{[D]} represents Serbia internationally.	
Serbia	Great Britain; England	Nikola Jović*	F	2022–present	4	Born in the U.K. to Serbian parents, represents Serbia internationally.	
Serbia	SFR Yugoslavia (now Serbia)	Nenad Krstić	C	2004–2011	7	Born in SFR Yugoslavia,^{[D]} represented FR Yugoslavia, Serbia and Montenegro, and Serbia internationally.	
Serbia	SFR Yugoslavia (now Bosnia and Herzegovina)	Ognjen Kuzmić	C	2013–2015	2	Born in SFR Yugoslavia,^{[D]} represents Serbia internationally.	
Serbia	SFR Yugoslavia (now Serbia)	Boban Marjanović	C	2015–2024	9	Born in SFR Yugoslavia,^{[D]} represents Serbia internationally.	
Serbia	FR Yugoslavia (now Serbia)	Vasilije Micić	G	2023–2025	2	Born in FR Yugoslavia,^{[D]} represents Serbia internationally.	
Serbia	SFR Yugoslavia (now Serbia)	Darko Miličić	F/C	2003–2012	10	Born in SFR Yugoslavia,^{[D]} represented FR Yugoslavia, Serbia and Montenegro, and Serbia internationally.	
Serbia	SFR Yugoslavia (now Serbia)	Nemanja Nedović	G	2013–2014	1	Born in SFR Yugoslavia,^{[D]} represents Serbia internationally.	
Serbia	SFR Yugoslavia (now Montenegro)	Žarko Paspalj	F	1989–1990	1	Born in SFR Yugoslavia,^{[D]} represented SFR Yugoslavia and FR Yugoslavia internationally.	
Serbia	SFR Yugoslavia (now Montenegro)	Sasha Pavlović	G/F	2003–2013	10	Born in SFR Yugoslavia,^{[D]} represented FR Yugoslavia, Serbia and Montenegro, and Serbia internationally.	
Serbia	SFR Yugoslavia (now Croatia)	Kosta Perović	C	2007–2008	1	Born in SFR Yugoslavia,^{[D]} represented FR Yugoslavia, Serbia and Montenegro, and Serbia internationally.	
Serbia	FR Yugoslavia (now Serbia)	Filip Petrušev	F	2023	1	Born in FR Yugoslavia,^{[D]} represents Serbia internationally.	
Serbia	FR Yugoslavia (now Serbia)	Aleksej Pokuševski	F	2020–2024	4	Born in FR Yugoslavia,^{[D]} represents Serbia internationally.	
Serbia	SFR Yugoslavia (now Bosnia and Herzegovina)	Vladimir Radmanović	F	2001–2013	12	Born in SFR Yugoslavia,^{[D]} represented FR Yugoslavia, Serbia and Montenegro, and Serbia internationally.	
Serbia	SFR Yugoslavia (now Serbia)	Miroslav Raduljica	C	2013–2015	2	Born in SFR Yugoslavia,^{[D]} represents Serbia internationally.	
Serbia	SFR Yugoslavia (now Serbia)	Igor Rakočević	G	2002–2003	1	Born in SFR Yugoslavia,^{[D]} represented FR Yugoslavia, Serbia and Montenegro, and Serbia internationally.	
Serbia	SFR Yugoslavia (now Serbia)	Željko Rebrača	C	2001–2007	5	Born in SFR Yugoslavia,^{[D]} represented SFR Yugoslavia, FR Yugoslavia, and Serbia and Montenegro internationally.	
Serbia	(Federal Republic of Yugoslavia) FR Yugoslavia (now Serbia)	Alen Smailagić	C	2019–2021	2	Born in FR Yugoslavia,^{[D]} represents Serbia internationally.	
Serbia	SFR Yugoslavia (now Croatia)	Peja Stojaković	F/G	1998–2011	13	Born in SFR Yugoslavia,^{[D]} represented FR Yugoslavia, Serbia and Montenegro, and Serbia internationally.	
Serbia	SFR Yugoslavia (now Serbia)	Dragan Tarlać	C	2000–2001	1	Born in SFR Yugoslavia,^{[D]} represented FR Yugoslavia and Serbia and Montenegro internationally.	
Serbia	SFR Yugoslavia (now Serbia)	Miloš Teodosić	G	2017–2019	2	Born in SFR Yugoslavia,^{[D]} represents Serbia internationally.	
Serbia	Serbia and Montenegro (present-day Serbia)	Nikola Topić*	G	2026–present	1	Born in Serbia and Montenegro, represents Serbia internationally.	
Serbia	Italy	Tristan Vukčević*	F/C	2024–present	3	Born in Italy to a Serbian father (former player Dušan Vukčević) and a Swedish mother. Has verbally committed to representing Serbia internationally, is also eligible to represent Sweden, Greece, Bosnia and Herzegovina, Italy, or Spain.	
Slovakia	Czechoslovakia (now Slovakia)	Richard Petruška	C/F	1993–1994	1	Born in Czechoslovakia,^{[E]} represented Czechoslovakia and Slovakia internationally.	
Slovenia	SFR Yugoslavia (now Slovenia)	Primož Brezec	C	2001–2008; 2009–2010	8	Born in SFR Yugoslavia,^{[D]} represented Slovenia internationally.	
Slovenia	—	Vlatko Čančar	F	2019–2025	6	—	
Slovenia	—	Luka Dončić*	G/F	2018–present	8	—	
Slovenia	SFR Yugoslavia (now Slovenia)	Goran Dragić	G	2008–2023	15	Born in SFR Yugoslavia,^{[D]} represents Slovenia internationally.	
Slovenia	SFR Yugoslavia (now Slovenia)	Zoran Dragić	G	2014–2015	1	Born in SFR Yugoslavia,^{[D]} represents Slovenia internationally.	
Slovenia	SFR Yugoslavia (now Slovenia)	Marko Milič	G/F	1997–1999	2	Born in SFR Yugoslavia,^{[D]} represented Slovenia internationally.	
Slovenia	SFR Yugoslavia (now Slovenia)	Boštjan Nachbar	F	2002–2008	6	Born in SFR Yugoslavia,^{[D]} represented Slovenia internationally.	
Slovenia	SFR Yugoslavia (now Slovenia)	Rasho Nesterović	C	1998–2010	12	Born in SFR Yugoslavia,^{[D]} represented Slovenia internationally.	
Slovenia	Germany	Anthony Randolph	F	2008–2014	6	Born in West Germany^{[G]} to American parents, grew up in the United States, represented Slovenia internationally.	
Slovenia	SFR Yugoslavia (now Slovenia)	Uroš Slokar	F	2006–2007	1	Born in SFR Yugoslavia,^{[D]} represented Slovenia internationally.	
Slovenia	SFR Yugoslavia (now Slovenia)	Beno Udrih	G	2004–2017	13	Born in SFR Yugoslavia,^{[D]} represented Slovenia internationally.	
Slovenia	SFR Yugoslavia (now Slovenia)	Sasha Vujačić	G	2004–2011; 2014; 2015–2017	10	Born in SFR Yugoslavia,^{[D]} represented Slovenia internationally.	
South Korea	—	Ha Seung-Jin	C	2004–2006	2	—	
South Sudan	Sudan (now South Sudan)	Deng Adel	F	2019	1	Born in present-day South Sudan, became a naturalized Australian citizen and represented Australia internationally before the 2024 Summer Olympics, where he represented South Sudan.	
South Sudan	Sudan	Bol Bol	C	2019–2025	6	Born in Sudan, grew up in the United States, represents South Sudan internationally.	
South Sudan	Sudan	Wenyen Gabriel	F	2019–2024	5	Born in Sudan, grew up in the United States.	
South Sudan	Sudan (now South Sudan)	Deng Gai	F	2005	1	Born in present-day South Sudan.^{[H]}	
South Sudan	Sudan (now South Sudan)	Thon Maker	F/C	2016–2021	5	Born in present-day South Sudan, became a naturalized Australian citizen, represented Australia internationally until the 2024 Summer Olympics, where he represented South Sudan.	
South Sudan	Sudan (now South Sudan)	Khaman Maluach*	C	2025–present	1	Born in present-day South Sudan.^{[H]}	
South Sudan	Sudan (now South Sudan)	Mangok Mathiang	F/C	2017–2018	1	Born in present-day South Sudan, moved to Australia at age 7. Previously represented Australia internationally, switched to representing South Sudan at the 2023 FIBA World Cup.	
South Sudan	Canada	Marial Shayok	G	2019–2020	1	Born in Canada to Sudanese parents, represents South Sudan internationally.	
Spain	—	Álex Abrines	G/F	2016–2019	3	—	
Spain	—	Santi Aldama*	F	2021–present	5	—	
Spain	—	José Calderón	G	2005–2019	14	—	
Spain	—	Victor Claver	F	2012–2015	3	—	
Spain	—	Rudy Fernández	G	2008–2012	4	—	
Spain	—	Jorge Garbajosa	F	2006–2008	2	—	
Spain	—	Usman Garuba	F/C	2021–2024	3	Born in Spain by Nigerian parents.	
Spain	—	Marc Gasol	C	2008–2021	13	—	
Spain	—	Pau Gasol^	F	2001–2019	18	—	
Spain	—	Hugo González*	F	2025–present	1	—	
Spain	—	Juancho Hernangómez	F	2016–2023	7	—	
Spain	—	Willy Hernangómez	C	2016–2023	7	—	
Spain	Republic of the Congo	Serge Ibaka	F	2009–2023	14	Born in the Republic of the Congo, obtained Spanish citizenship, represents Spain internationally.	
Spain	—	Sergio de Larrea*	G	2026-present		—	
Spain	—	Raül López	G	2002–2005	2	—	
Spain	—	Aday Mara*	C	2026-present		—	
Spain	—	Fernando Martín	C	1986–1987	1	—	
Spain	—	Baba Miller*	F	2026-present		—	
Spain	SFR Yugoslavia (now Montenegro)	Nikola Mirotić	F	2014–2019	5	Born in SFR Yugoslavia,^{[D]} represents Spain internationally.	
Spain	—	Juan Carlos Navarro	G	2007–2008	1	—	
Spain	—	Sergio Rodríguez	G	2006–2010; 2016–2017	5	—	
Spain	—	Ricky Rubio	G	2011–2023	12	—	
Sudan	Sudan (now South Sudan)^{[H]}	Manute Bol	C	1985–1995	10	—	
Sweden	—	Jonas Jerebko	F	2009–2019	10	—	
Sweden	—	Bobi Klintman*	F	2025–present	2	—	
Sweden	—	Pelle Larsson*	G/F	2024–present	2	—	
Sweden	—	Jeff Taylor	F	2012–2015	3	Born in Sweden to an American father and a Swedish mother; also a United States citizen by birth. Represented Sweden internationally.	
Switzerland	—	Clint Capela*	F	2014–present	12	Born in Switzerland to an Angolan father and a Congolese mother.	
Switzerland	—	Yanic Konan Niederhäuser*	C	2025–present	1	—	
Switzerland	—	Thabo Sefolosha	G	2006–2020	14	Born in Switzerland to a South African father and a Swiss mother.	
Tanzania	—	Hasheem Thabeet	C	2009–2014	5	—	
Trinidad and Tobago	—	Ken Charles	G	1973–1977	5	Born in Trinidad, moved to the U.S. as a child.	
Tunisia	—	Salah Mejri	C	2015–2019	4	—	
Turkey	—	Furkan Aldemir	F/C	2014–2015	1	—	
Turkey	—	Ömer Aşık	C/F	2010–2018	9	—	
Turkey	—	Onuralp Bitim	G/F	2023–2024	1	—	
Turkey	Nigeria	Adem Bona* (formerly Ikechukwu Okoro)	F/C	2024–present	2	Born in Nigeria, moved to Turkey at age 13 and became a naturalized citizen, represents Turkey internationally.	
Turkey	—	Semih Erden	C	2010–2012	2	—	
Turkey	Switzerland	Enes Freedom (formerly Enes Kanter)	F	2011–2022	11	Born in Switzerland to Turkish parents.	
Turkey	—	Ersan İlyasova	F	2006–2007; 2009–2021	14	—	
Turkey	—	Furkan Korkmaz	G	2017–2024	7	—	
Turkey	—	Ibo Kutluay	G	2004–2005	1	—	
Turkey	—	Mehmet Okur	F/C	2002–2012	10	—	
Turkey	North Macedonia	Cedi Osman	F	2017–2024	7	Born in Macedonia to Turkish father and Bosnian mother, grew up in Bosnia and Herzegovina, represents Turkey internationally.	
Turkey	—	Alperen Şengün*	F	2021–present	5	—	
Turkey	SFR Yugoslavia (now Serbia)	Mirsad Türkcan	F	1999–2000	1	Born in SFR Yugoslavia,^{[D]} represented Turkey internationally.	
Turkey	—	Hedo Türkoğlu	F	2000–2015	15	—	
Turkey	Uzbekistan	Ömer Yurtseven*	F	2021–2024; 2026–present	4	Born in Uzbekistan to Turkish parents.	
Ukraine	Soviet Union (now Ukraine)	Kyrylo Fesenko	C	2007–2012	5	Born in the Soviet Union.^{[F]} represented Ukraine internationally.	
Ukraine	Soviet Union (now Ukraine)	Viacheslav Kravtsov	C	2012–2014	2	Born in the Soviet Union.^{[F]} represented Ukraine internationally.	
Ukraine	—	Alex Len	C	2013–2025	12	—	
Ukraine	Soviet Union (now Ukraine)	Slava Medvedenko	F	2000–2007	7	Born in the Soviet Union,^{[F]} represented Ukraine internationally.	
Ukraine	—	Svi Mykhailiuk*	F	2018–present	8	—	
Ukraine	Soviet Union (now Ukraine)	Oleksiy Pecherov	C	2007–2010	3	Born in the Soviet Union,^{[F]} represented Ukraine internationally.	
Ukraine	Soviet Union (now Ukraine)	Vitaly Potapenko	C	1996–2007	11	Born in the Soviet Union.^{[F]}	
Ukraine	—	Max Shulga*	G	2026–present	1	—	
Ukraine	—	Dmytro Skapintsev	C	2023	1	—	
Ukraine	Soviet Union (now Russia)	Alexander Volkov	F	1989–1992	3	Born in the Soviet Union,^{[F]} represented Soviet Union and Ukraine internationally.	
United States	Taiwan	Joe Alexander	F	2008–2010	2	Born in Taiwan to American parents, moved to the United States at the age of 8.	
United States	Netherlands	Hank Beenders	C/F	1946–1949	3	Born in the Netherlands, moved to the United States at the age of 8, became a naturalized U.S. citizen.	
United States	Panama	Rolando Blackman	G	1981–1994	13	Born in Panama, became a naturalized U.S. citizen, represented the United States internationally.	
United States	West Germany (now Germany)	Carlos Boozer	F/C	2002–2015	13	Born in West Germany^{[G]} to American parents, grew up in the United States, represents the United States internationally.	
United States	West Germany (now Germany)	John Brown	F	1973–1980	7	Born in West Germany^{[G]} to American parents, grew up in the United States.	
United States	Spain	Wallace Bryant	C	1983–1986	3	Born in Spain to American parents, grew up in the United States.	
United States	U.S. Virgin Islands	Tim Duncan^	F/C	1997–2016	19	Born in U.S. Virgin Islands, represented the United States internationally before announcing his international retirement in 2004.	
United States	West Germany (now Germany)	Kenton Edelin	F	1985	1	Born in West Germany^{[G]} to American parents.	
United States	Cameroon	Joel Embiid*	C	2016–present	10	Born in Cameroon, moved to the United States at age 16, became a naturalized citizen and represents the United States internationally. Also holds Cameroonian and French citizenships.	
United States	West Germany (now Germany)	Jo Jo English	G	1992–1995	3	Born in West Germany^{[G]} to American parents.	
United States	Jamaica	Patrick Ewing^	C/F	1985–2002	17	Born in Jamaica, moved to the United States at the age of 11, became a naturalized U.S. citizen, represented the United States internationally.	
United States	Morocco	Mike Flynn	G	1975–1978	3	Born in French Morocco to American parents, grew up in the United States	
United States	Saint Vincent and the Grenadines	Adonal Foyle	C	1997–2009	12	Born in Saint Vincent and the Grenadines, moved to the United States, became a naturalized U.S. citizen.	
United States	West Germany (now Germany)	Donté Greene	F	2008–2012	4	Born in West Germany^{[G]} to American parents, previously represented the United States at youth level.	
United States	Great Britain; England	George Grimshaw	G	1946–1947	1	Born in England, moved to the United States, became a naturalized U.S. citizen.	
United States	Romania	Ernie Grunfeld	G/F	1977–1986	9	Born in Romania, moved to the United States at the age of 9, became a naturalized U.S. citizen, represented the United States internationally.	
United States	Belgium	Xavier Henry	G	2010–2014	5	Born in Belgium to American parents, grew up in the United States.	
United States	Austria-Hungary (now Croatia)	Nat Hickey (formerly Nicola Zarnecić)	G/F	1948	1	Born in Korčula, which represented the Kingdom of Dalmatia side of Austria-Hungary (now separated into multiple nations (including Austria and Hungary), with Korčula being in Croatia) to Croatian parents. Was also a head coach at the time and is currently the oldest player in NBA history.	
United States	Australia	Kyrie Irving*	G	2011–present	15	Born in Australia to American parents, has dual U.S. and Australian citizenship, has represented the United States internationally at youth and senior level.	
United States	Italy	Reggie Jackson	G	2011–2025	14	Born in Italy to American parents, grew up in the United States.	
United States	Lebanon	Steve Kerr	G	1988–2003	15	Born in Lebanon to the Lebanese-born American citizen Malcolm H. Kerr, represented the United States internationally.	
United States	France	Cozell McQueen	F	1987	1	Born in France to American parents.	
United States	Manchukuo (now China)	Tom Meschery (formerly Tomislav Meshcheryakov)	F	1961–1971	10	Born in Manchukuo (a puppet state of the Empire of Japan, now part of China) to Russian parents, moved to the United States at the age of 8, became a naturalized U.S. citizen.	
United States	Nigeria	Hakeem Olajuwon^	C	1984–2002	18	Born and raised in Nigeria, moved to the U.S. at the age of 17 (two years after playing basketball for the first time). Eventually became a naturalized U.S. citizen, represented the United States internationally.	
United States	United Kingdom; England	Admiral Schofield	F	2019–2020; 2021–2024	4	Born in England to American parents, grew up in the United States.	
United States	Sweden	Miles Simon	G	1998–1999	1	Born in Sweden to an American father and a Norwegian mother.	
United States	France	Michael Stewart	C	1997–2005	8	Born in France to American parents.	
United States	Spain	Wally Szczerbiak	F	1999–2009	10	Born in Spain to American parents, has represented the United States internationally.	
United States	Japan	Cameron Thomas*	F	2021–present	5	Born in Japan to American parents, grew up in the United States.	
United States	West Germany (now Germany)	Kiki Vandeweghe	F	1980–1993	13	Born in West Germany^{[G]} to a Canadian father and 1952 Miss America pageant winner Colleen Kay Hutchins. Moved back to the U.S. as a child. Holds both American and Canadian passports.	
United States	West Germany (now Germany)	Duane Washington	G	1988; 1993	2	Born in West Germany^{[G]} to American parents.	
United States	Germany	Duane Washington Jr.	G	2021–2024	3	Born in Germany to American parents, grew up in the United States.	
United States	France	Dominique Wilkins^	F/G	1982–1995; 1996–1997; 1999	15	Born in France to American parents, represented the United States internationally.	
U.S. Virgin Islands	—	Raja Bell	G	2000–2013	13	—	
U.S. Virgin Islands	—	Charles Claxton	G	1995	1	—	
Uruguay	—	Esteban Batista	F/C	2005–2007	2	—	
Venezuela	Trinidad and Tobago	Carl Herrera	F	1991–1999	8	Born in Trinidad and Tobago, represented Venezuela internationally.	
Venezuela	—	Óscar Torres	F	2001–2002	2	—	
Venezuela	—	Greivis Vásquez	G	2010–2016	7	—	

== Notes ==
- ^{A} Nationality indicates a player's representative nationality.
- ^{B} Birthplace indicates a player's country of birth. A blank column indicates that the player's birth country is the same to his nationality.
- ^{C} Career in the NBA
- ^{D} SFR Yugoslavia dissolved in 1992 into five independent countries, Bosnia and Herzegovina, Croatia, the Republic of Macedonia, Slovenia, and the Federal Republic of Yugoslavia. FR Yugoslavia was later renamed into Serbia and Montenegro in February 2003 and dissolved in June 2006 into two independent countries, Montenegro and Serbia. In 2019, Macedonia was officially renamed North Macedonia.
- ^{E} Czechoslovakia dissolved on January 1, 1993, into two independent countries, the Czech Republic and Slovakia.In 2016, the Czech Republic officially began to use its geographical name Czechia.
- ^{F} Soviet Union dissolved in December 1991.
- ^{G} Germany was previously divided into two independent countries, the Federal Republic of Germany (West Germany) and German Democratic Republic (East Germany), from 1949 to 1990. Before that, however, it was formerly known as the Weimar Republic from after World War I ended in 1918 until 1933 once Adolf Hitler was elected as chancellor and produced the Enabling Act of 1933 shortly after.
- ^{H} On July 9, 2011, South Sudan became independent from Sudan, following a vote for independence in a January 2011 referendum.
- ^{I} Estonia, Latvia, and Lithuania are considered in international law to have kept de jure independence from 1944 to 1991 while being de facto controlled by the Soviet Union.

== See also ==
=== NBA ===
- List of foreign NBA coaches
- Lists of NBA players
  - List of current NBA players
- List of NBA players by country:
  - List of Australian NBA players
  - List of Canadian NBA players
  - List of Croatian NBA players
  - List of French NBA players
  - List of Greek NBA players
  - List of Italian NBA players
  - List of Lithuanian NBA players
  - List of Montenegrin NBA players
  - List of Serbian NBA players
  - List of Turkish NBA players
- Race and ethnicity in the NBA

=== Other leagues ===
- List of foreign basketball players in Serbia
- Foreign players in the National Football League
- List of WNBA players born outside the United States
- List of NHL statistical leaders by country
- List of countries with their first Major League Baseball player
- List of current Major League Baseball players by nationality
