= List of Italian NBA players =

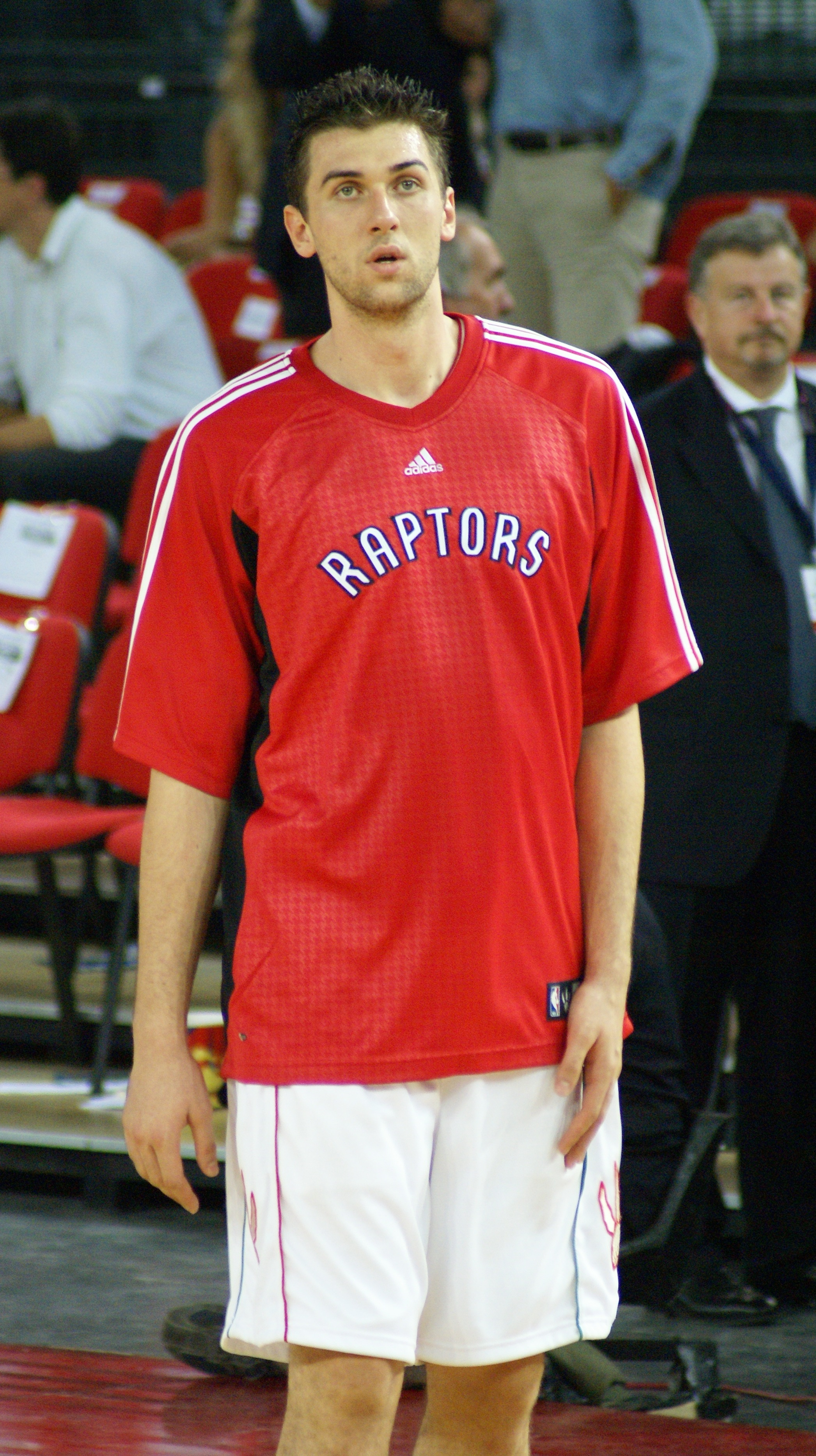
Andrea Bargnani was selected by the Toronto Raptors as the first overall pick in the 2006 NBA draft.

The National Basketball Association (NBA) is a men's professional basketball league in North America. This list comprises all Italian players who have played in the NBA since its foundation in 1946. Each player's entry includes the seasons he spent in the league, the teams he played for, the number of appearances he made (both in regular season and playoffs) and his draft information. The list also includes players who were born outside of Italy but hold Italian citizenship or have represented the Italian national team in FIBA-sanctioned competitions, as well as Italian-born players who acquired another nationality at some point. Players who were born in Italy to foreign parents and never held Italian citizenship are not included.

By the aforementioned criteria, 11 Italian players have played in the NBA. The first Italian-born player to feature in the league was Hank Biasatti, who appeared in six games for the Toronto Huskies during the 1946–47 season and subsequently was picked by the Boston Celtics in the 1947 draft; Biasatti, however, was a Canadian citizen by naturalization at the time of his debut, having moved to Canada with his parents as a child. In the 1970 draft, Dino Meneghin was selected as an 11th round pick by the Atlanta Hawks, thus becoming the first Italian- and European-raised player to be drafted by an NBA team; nonetheless, Meneghin was never signed. In 1989, Mike D'Antoni became the first player with NBA experience to represent Italy in international competitions, being selected to the Italian squad for the European Championship; an American citizen by birth, D'Antoni had been playing in the Italian League for 12 years and had been granted Italian citizenship due to his Italian ancestry. On November 12, 1995, Stefano Rusconi became the first Italian-raised player to play in the NBA, as he made his debut for the Phoenix Suns. In the 2006 draft, Andrea Bargnani was selected by the Toronto Raptors as the first overall pick, being the first—and to date only—Italian and European player to be drafted first overall.

Marco Belinelli is currently the all-time leader among Italians in both regular season and playoff games played, with 860 and 65 respectively. Belinelli was also the first Italian to both play in the NBA Finals and win an NBA Championship, having done so as a member of the San Antonio Spurs in 2014.

== Key ==
Pos.	G	F	C
Position	Guard	Forward	Center

*	Denotes player who is still active in the NBA

== Players ==
Note: Statistics are correct as of the end of the 2021–22 season.

Player		NBA career		Games played		NBA draft			Notes	Ref.
Name	Pos.	Team(s) played	Years (Note: Each year is linked to an article about that particular NBA season.)	RS	PO	Year	Pick	Team	Notes	Ref.
Paolo Banchero*	F	Orlando Magic (2022–present)	2022–present	72	—	2022	1st	Orlando Magic	Italian-American (Note: Banchero was born in the United States to an African-American mother (Rhonda Banchero) and an Italian American father, thus being able to acquire Italian dual citizenship through ancestry.)	
Andrea Bargnani	F/C	3 teams: Toronto Raptors (2006–2013); New York Knicks (2013–2015); Brooklyn Nets (2015–2016)	2006–2016	550	11	2006	1st	Toronto Raptors	—	
Marco Belinelli	G	9 teams: Golden State Warriors (2007–2009); Toronto Raptors (2009–2010); New Orleans Hornets (2010–2012); Chicago Bulls (2012–2013); San Antonio Spurs (2013–2015, 2018–2020); Sacramento Kings (2015–2016); Charlotte Hornets (2016–2017); Atlanta Hawks (2017–2018); Philadelphia 76ers (2018)	2007–2020	860	65	2007	18th	Golden State Warriors	—	
Hank Biasatti	G	Toronto Huskies	1946–1947	6	—	1947	n/a	Boston Celtics	Italian-Canadian (Note: Biasatti was born in Italy and grew up in Canada, where he acquired Canadian citizenship through naturalization.)	
Mike D'Antoni	G	2 teams: Kansas City–Omaha / Kansas City Kings (1973–1975); San Antonio Spurs (1976)	1973–1976	130	4	1973	20th	Kansas City–Omaha Kings	Italian-American (Note: D'Antoni was born in the United States to Italian American parents and he acquired Italian dual citizenship through ancestry; he represented Italy internationally.)	
Luigi Datome	F	2 teams: Detroit Pistons (2013–2015); Boston Celtics (2015)	2013–2015	55	3	2009	Undrafted		—	
Travis Diener	G	3 teams: Orlando Magic (2005–2007); Indiana Pacers (2007–2010); Portland Trail Blazers (2010)	2005–2010	179	2	2005	38th	Orlando Magic	American-born Italian (Note: Diener was born in the United States and he acquired Italian dual citizenship through marriage; he represented Italy internationally.)	
Vincenzo Esposito	G	Toronto Raptors	1995–1996	30	—	1991	Undrafted		—	
Simone Fontecchio*	F	2 teams: Utah Jazz (2022–2024); Detroit Pistons (2024–present)	2022–present	52	—	2017	Undrafted		—	
Danilo Gallinari	F	9 teams: New York Knicks (2008–2011); Denver Nuggets (2011–2017); Los Angeles Clippers (2017–2019); Oklahoma City Thunder (2019–2020); Atlanta Hawks (2020–2022); Boston Celtics (2022–2023); Washington Wizards (2023–2024); Detroit Pistons (2024-2024); Milwaukee Bucks (2024-2024)	2008–2024	728	48	2008	6th	New York Knicks	—	
Nico Mannion	G	Golden State Warriors	2020–2021	30	—	2020	48th	Golden State Warriors	Italian-American (Note: Mannion was born in Italy to an American father (Pace Mannion) and an Italian mother, thus being an Italian-American dual citizen by birth; he represented Italy internationally.)	
Nicolò Melli	F	2 teams: New Orleans Pelicans (2019–2021); Dallas Mavericks (2021)	2019–2021	105	3	2013	Undrafted		—	
Stefano Rusconi	C/F	Phoenix Suns	1995–1996	7	—	1990	52nd	Cleveland Cavaliers	—	

== Other draftees ==
The following players were drafted but either never played or have yet to play in the NBA.

Player	Pos.	Year	Pick	Team	Notes	Ref.
Augusto Binelli	C	1986	40th	Atlanta Hawks	—	
Alessandro Gentile	G	2014	53rd	Minnesota Timberwolves (Note: Draft rights traded to the Houston Rockets on draft night.)	—	
Dino Meneghin	C	1970	182nd	Atlanta Hawks	—	
Riccardo Morandotti	F	1987	136th	Atlanta Hawks	—	
Gabriele Procida	F	2022	36th	Detroit Pistons	—	
Matteo Spagnolo	G	2022	50th	Minnesota Timberwolves	—	

== See also ==
- List of foreign NBA players
