= List of French NBA players =

The following is a list of French players in the National Basketball Association (NBA). This list also includes players who were born outside France but have represented the French national team.

== Key ==
Pos.	G	F	C
Position	Guard	Forward	Center

*	Denotes player who is still active in the NBA

== Players ==
Note: updated on November 1st, 2026

Player	Pos.	Team(s) played	Career^{[a]}	Regular season	Playoffs	Year (pick)	Team	Notes	Ref.
Player	Pos.	Team(s) played	Career^{[a]}	Games played		NBA draft		Notes	Ref.
Tariq Abdul-Wahad	F	Sacramento Kings; Orlando Magic; Denver Nuggets; Dallas Mavericks	1997–2003	236	13	1997 (11th)	Sacramento Kings	—	
Alexis Ajinça	F	Charlotte Bobcats; Dallas Mavericks; Toronto Raptors; New Orleans Pelicans	2008–2017	293	3	2008 (20th)	Dallas Mavericks	—	
Joël Ayayi	F	Washington Wizards	2022	7	0	Undrafted		—	
Adama Bal	G	Memphis Grizzlies	2026	8	0	Undrafted		—	
Nicolas Batum	F	Portland Trail Blazers; Charlotte Hornets; Los Angeles Clippers; Philadelphia 76ers Los Angeles Clippers	2008–2026	1205	76	2008 (25th)	Houston Rockets	—	
Rodrigue Beaubois	G	Dallas Mavericks	2009–2013	182	6	2009 (25th)	Oklahoma City Thunder	Born in Guadeloupe, a French overseas department in the Caribbean.	
Joan Beringer*	C	Minnesota Timberwolves	2025–present	46	5	2025 (17th)	Minnesota Timberwolves	—	
Howard Carter	G	Denver Nuggets; Dallas Mavericks	1983–1985	66	5	1983 (15th)	Denver Nuggets	Born in the United States, became a naturalized French citizen, represented France internationally during his playing career.	
Malcolm Cazalon	G	Detroit Pistons	2023–2024	1	0	Undrafted		—	
Sidy Cissoko*	F	San Antonio Spurs; Portland Trail Blazers	2023–present	113	4	2023 (44th)		—	
Petr Cornelie	F/C	Denver Nuggets	2022	13	0	2016 (53rd)	Denver Nuggets	—	
Bilal Coulibaly*	F	Washington Wizards	2023–present	184	0	2023 (7th)	Indiana Pacers	—	
Pacome Dadiet*	G	New York Knicks	2024–present	48	9	2024 (25th)	New York Knicks	—	
Nando de Colo	G	San Antonio Spurs; Toronto Raptors	2012–2014	119	6	2009 (53rd)	San Antonio Spurs	—	
Moussa Diabaté*	C	Los Angeles Clippers; Charlotte Hornets	2022–present	183	0	2022 (43rd)	Los Angeles Clippers	—	
Boris Diaw	F/C	Atlanta Hawks; Phoenix Suns; Charlotte Bobcats; San Antonio Spurs; Utah Jazz	2003–2017	1064	119	2003 (21st)	Atlanta Hawks	—	
Mohamed Diawara*	F	New York Knicks	2025–present	70	6	2025 (51st)	Los Angeles Clippers	—	
Yakhouba Diawara	F	Denver Nuggets; Miami Heat	2006–2010	187	9	Undrafted		—	
Ousmane Dieng*	F	Oklahoma City Thunder; Milwaukee Bucks	2022–present	170	13	2022 (11th)	Oklahoma City Thunder	—	
Sekou Doumbouya	F	Detroit Pistons; Los Angeles Lakers	2019–2022	96	0	2019 (15th)	Detroit Pistons	Born in Guinea to Guinean parents, grew up in France, represents France internationally	
Noa Essengue*	F	Chicago Bulls	2025–present	7	0	2025 (12th)	Chicago Bulls	—	
Evan Fournier	G	Denver Nuggets; Orlando Magic; Boston Celtics; New York Knicks; Detroit Pistons	2012–2024	704	19	2012 (20th)	Denver Nuggets	—	
Mickaël Gelabale	F	Seattle SuperSonics; Minnesota Timberwolves	2006–2008, 2013	145	0	2005 (48th)	Seattle SuperSonics	Born in Guadeloupe, a French overseas department in the Caribbean.	
Rudy Gobert*	C	Utah Jazz; Minnesota Timberwolves	2013–present	911	96	2013 (27th)	Denver Nuggets	—	
Killian Hayes	G	Detroit Pistons; Brooklyn Nets; Sacramento Kings	2020-2026	239	0	2020 (7th)	Detroit Pistons	Born in the United States to an American father and a French mother, grew up in France and represents France internationally	
Jaylen Hoard	F	Portland Trail Blazers; Oklahoma City Thunder	2019–2022	39	3	Undrafted		—	
William Howard	G	Houston Rockets	2019–2020	2	0	Undrafted		—	
Damien Inglis	F	Milwaukee Bucks	2014–2015	20	0	2014 (31st)	Milwaukee Bucks	Born in French Guiana, a French overseas department in South America.	
Joffrey Lauvergne	F	Denver Nuggets; Oklahoma City Thunder; Chicago Bulls; San Antonio Spurs	2014–2018	208	4	2013 (55th)	Memphis Grizzlies	—	
Timothé Luwawu-Cabarrot	G/F	Philadelphia 76ers Oklahoma City Thunder; Chicago Bulls; Brooklyn Nets; Atlanta Hawks	2016–2022	328	15	2016 (24th)	Philadelphia 76ers	—	
Ian Mahinmi	C	San Antonio Spurs; Dallas Mavericks; Indiana Pacers; Washington Wizards	2007–2020	618	67	2005 (28th)	San Antonio Spurs	—	
Théo Maledon	G	Oklahoma City Thunder; Charlotte Hornets; Phoenix Suns	2020–2024	177	0	2020 (34th)	Philadelphia 76ers	—	
Jérôme Moïso	F	Boston Celtics; Charlotte/New Orleans Hornets; Toronto Raptors; New Jersey Nets; Cleveland Cavaliers	2000–2005	145	4	2000 (11th)	Boston Celtics	—	
Adam Mokoka	G	Chicago Bulls	2019–2021	25	0	Undrafted		—	
Joakim Noah	C	Chicago Bulls; New York Knicks; Memphis Grizzlies; Los Angeles Clippers	2007–2020	672	62	2007 (9th)	Chicago Bulls	Born in the United States to a French father and a Swedish mother, grew up in the United States, became a French citizen and represented France internationally	
Frank Ntilikina	G	New York Knicks; Dallas Mavericks; Charlotte Hornets	2017–2024	321	15	2017 (8th)	New York Knicks	Born in Belgium to Rwandese parents, grew up in France, represents France internationally	
Elie Okobo	G	Phoenix Suns	2018–2020	108	0	2018 (31st)	Phoenix Suns	—	
Tony Parker	G	San Antonio Spurs; Charlotte Hornets	2001–2019	1254	226	2001 (28th)	San Antonio Spurs	Born in Belgium to an American father and a Dutch mother, grew up in France, represented France internationally.	
Noah Penda*	F	Orlando Magic	2025–present	59	1	2025 (32nd)	Boston Celtics	—	
Johan Petro	C	Seattle SuperSonics; Denver Nuggets; New Jersey Nets; Atlanta Hawks	2005–2013	473	22	2005 (25th)	Seattle SuperSonics	—	
Mickaël Piétrus	G/F	Golden State Warriors; Orlando Magic; Phoenix Suns; Boston Celtics; Toronto Raptors	2003–2013	557	69	2003 (11th)	Golden State Warriors	Born in Guadeloupe, a French overseas department in the Caribbean.	
Vincent Poirier	C	Boston Celtics; Philadelphia 76ers	2019–2021	32	1	Undrafted		—	
Yves Pons	F	Memphis Grizzlies	2022	12	0	Undrafted		Born in Haïti, grew up in France, represents France internationally	
Maxime Raynaud*	C	Sacramento Kings	2025–present	74	0	2025 (42nd)	Sacramento Kings	—	
Antoine Rigaudeau	G	Dallas Mavericks	2003	11	0	Undrafted		—	
Bob Riley	F	Atlanta Hawks	1970–1971	7	0	1970 (82nd)	Atlanta Hawks	Born in the United States, became a naturalized French citizen, represented France internationally during his playing career.	
Zaccharie Risacher*	F	Atlanta Hawks; Dallas Mavericks	2024–present	148	3	2024 (1st)	Atlanta Hawks	—	
Rayan Rupert*	G	Portland Trail Blazers; Memphis Grizzlies; Philadelphia 76ers	2023–present	155	0	2023 (43rd)	Portland Trail Blazers	—	
Tidjane Salaün*	F	Charlotte Hornets	2024–present	102	0	2024 (6th)	Charlotte Hornets	—	
Alex Sarr*	C	Washington Wizards	2024–present	121	0	2024 (2nd)	Washington Wizards	—	
Olivier Sarr	C	Oklahoma City Thunder; Cleveland Cavaliers	2021–2026	50	0	Undrafted		—	
Kevin Séraphin	F	Washington Wizards; New York Knicks; Indiana Pacers	2010–2017	423	14	2010 (17th)	Chicago Bulls	Born in French Guiana, a French overseas department in South America.	
Pape Sy	F/G	Atlanta Hawks	2010–2011	3	4	2010 (53rd)	Atlanta Hawks	—	
Killian Tillie	F	Memphis Grizzlies	2022	54	0	Undrafted		—	
Axel Toupane	F/G	Denver Nuggets; Milwaukee Bucks; New Orleans Pelicans	2015–2021	33	4	Undrafted		—	
Armel Traoré	F	Los Angeles Lakers	2025	9	0	Undrafted			
Nolan Traoré*	G	Brooklyn Nets	2025–present	61	0	2025 (19th)	Brooklyn Nets	—	
Ronny Turiaf	F	Los Angeles Lakers; Golden State Warriors; New York Knicks; Washington Wizards; Miami Heat; Los Angeles Clippers; Minnesota Timberwolves	2005–2015	473	47	2005 (37th)	Los Angeles Lakers	Born in Martinique, a French overseas department in the Caribbean.	
Victor Wembanyama*	C	San Antonio Spurs	2023–present	186	22	2023 (1st)	San Antonio Spurs	—	
Guerschon Yabusele	C/F	Boston Celtics; Philadelphia 76ers New York Knicks; Chicago Bulls	2017–2026	211	16	2016 (16th)	Boston Celtics		

== Drafted but never played ==
Last update NBA draft 2026

Player	Pos.	Year (pick)	Team	Notes	Ref.
Player	Pos.	NBA draft		Notes	Ref.
Jean-Claude Lefèbvre	C	1960 (64th)	Minneapolis Lakers		
Alain Digbeu	F/G	1997 (50th)	Atlanta Hawks		
Frédéric Weis	C	1999 (15th)	New York Knicks		
Paccelis Morlende	G	2003 (50th)	Philadelphia 76ers (traded to Seattle SuperSonics on draft-day)		
Livio Jean-Charles	F	2013 (28th)	San Antonio Spurs		
Louis Labeyrie	F/C	2014 (57th)	Indiana Pacers		
David Michineau	G	2016 (39th)	New Orleans Pelicans		
Isaia Cordinier	G	2016 (44th)	Atlanta Hawks		
Mathias Lessort	C	2017 (50th)	Philadelphia 76ers		
Alpha Kaba	C	2017 (60th)	Atlanta Hawks		
Juhann Begarin	G	2021 (45th)	Boston Celtics		
Ismaël Kamagate	G	2022 (46th)	Detroit Pistons		
Hugo Besson	G	2022 (58th)	Indiana Pacers		
Melvin Ajinça	F	2024 (51st)	Dallas Mavericks		
Narcisse Ngoy	C	2026 (57th)	Atlanta Hawks		

== Miscellaneous ==
Player	Pos.	Team(s) played	Career^{[a]}	Regular season	Playoffs	Year (pick)	Team	Notes	Ref.
Player	Pos.	Team(s) played	Career^{[a]}	Games played		NBA draft		Notes	Ref.
Bob Cousy	G	Boston Celtics; Cincinnati Royals	1950–1971	924	109	1950 (3rd)	Tri-Cities Blackhawks	Born in the United States to French immigrants living in New York City. He never represented France internationally.	
Joel Embiid	C	Philadelphia 76ers	2016–present	397	53	2014 (3rd)	Philadelphia 76ers	Cameroonian-born player who obtained the French nationality in 2022, considered representing France internationally, but opted to play for the United States instead.	

== Notes ==
- ^{a} Each year is linked to an article about that particular NBA season.

== See also ==
- List of foreign NBA players
