= List of Greek NBA players =

The list of Greek players that either play or have played in the National Basketball Association (NBA):

== Currently active NBA players ==
Draft Year	Round	Pick	Entry Year	Player	Teams	teams played for
2013	1st	#15	2013	(Greece) Giannis Antetokounmpo	Milwaukee Bucks	Milwaukee Bucks
2014	2nd	#51	2016	(Greece) Thanasis Antetokounmpo	Milwaukee Bucks	New York Knicks, Milwaukee Bucks

== Former NBA players ==
Draft Year	Round	Pick	Entry Year	Player	Drafted by	NBA teams played for	NBA seasons	NBA games	NBA playoff games
1953	7th	#57	1953	(United States) - (Greece) Lou Tsioropoulos	Boston Celtics	Boston Celtics	3	157	11
1959	5th	#37	1960	(United States) - (Greece) Nick Mantis	Saint Louis Hawks	Minneapolis Lakers, St. Louis Hawks, Chicago Zephyrs	2	52	11
1980	3rd	#58	1980	(United States) - (Greece) Kurt Rambis	New York Knicks	Los Angeles Lakers, Charlotte Hornets, Phoenix Suns, Sacramento Kings	14	880	139
1987	Undrafted	Undrafted	1987	(Russia) - (Greece) Sergei Bazarevich	Undrafted	Atlanta Hawks	1	10	-
1996	1st	#23	2002	(Greece) Efthimios Rentzias	Denver Nuggets	Philadelphia 76ers	1	35	-
2000	1st	#25	2000	(Greece) - (Georgia (country)) Jake Tsakalidis	Phoenix Suns	Phoenix Suns, Memphis Grizzlies, Houston Rockets	7	315	10
2001	2nd	#47	2001	(Greece) Antonis Fotsis	Memphis Grizzlies	Memphis Grizzlies	1	28	-
2003	2nd	#58	2006	(Greece) Andreas Glyniadakis	Detroit Pistons	Seattle SuperSonics	1	13	-
2004	2nd	#50	2006	(Greece) Vassilis Spanoulis	Dallas Mavericks	Houston Rockets	1	31	1
2008	1st	#23	2008	(Greece) - (United States) Kosta Koufos	Utah Jazz	Utah Jazz, Minnesota Timberwolves, Denver Nuggets, Memphis Grizzlies, Sacramento Kings	12	686	37
2009	2nd	#45	2013	(Greece) - (United States) Nick Calathes	Minnesota Timberwolves	Memphis Grizzlies	2	129	9
2012	2nd	#48	2014	(Greece) Kostas Papanikolaou	New York Knicks	Houston Rockets, Denver Nuggets	2	69	8
2016	1st	#13	2016	(Greece) Georgios Papagiannis	Phoenix Suns	Sacramento Kings, Portland Trail Blazers	2	39	-
2017	2nd	#41	2017	(Greece) - (United States) Tyler Dorsey	Atlanta Hawks	Atlanta Hawks, Memphis Grizzlies, Dallas Mavericks	3	107	-
2017	Undrafted	Undrafted	2017	(Canada) - (Greece) Naz Mitrou-Long	Undrafted	Utah Jazz, Indiana Pacers	3	20	-
2018	2nd	#60	2018	(Greece) Kostas Antetokounmpo	Philadelphia 76ers	Dallas Mavericks, Los Angeles Lakers, Chicago Bulls	3	22	-
2021	2nd	#60	2021	(Greece) Georgios Kalaitzakis	Milwaukee Bucks	Milwaukee Bucks, Oklahoma City Thunder	1	13	-

== Drafted but did not play in the NBA ==
Draft Year	Round	Pick	Player	Drafted by
1978	4th	#72	(Greece) - (United States) David Stergakos	Boston Celtics
1978	5th	#95	(United States) - (Greece) Dave Caligaris	Detroit Pistons
1979	4th	#68	(Greece) - (United States) Nick Galis	Boston Celtics
1982	9th	#205	(Greece) Panagiotis Giannakis	Boston Celtics
1986	2nd	#37	(Greece) Panagiotis Fasoulas	Portland Trail Blazers
1987	4th	#90	(Greece) Fanis Christodoulou	Atlanta Hawks
2003	2nd	#34	(Greece) Sofoklis Schortsanitis	Los Angeles Clippers
2006	2nd	#57	(Greece) Loukas Mavrokefalidis	Minnesota Timberwolves
2007	2nd	#58	(Greece) Georgios Printezis	San Antonio Spurs
2015	2nd	#59	(Greece) Dimitrios Agravanis	Atlanta Hawks

== All the drafted players ==
Draft Year	Round	Pick	Player	Drafted by
1953	7th	#57	(United States) - (Greece) Lou Tsioropoulos	Boston Celtics
1959	5th	#37	(United States) - (Greece) Nick Mantis	Saint Louis Hawks
1978	4th	#72	(Greece) - (United States) David Stergakos	Boston Celtics
1978	5th	#95	(United States) - (Greece) Dave Caligaris	Detroit Pistons
1979	4th	#68	(Greece) - (United States) Nick Galis	Boston Celtics
1980	3rd	#58	(United States) - (Greece) Kurt Rambis	New York Knicks
1982	9th	#205	(Greece) Panagiotis Giannakis	Boston Celtics
1986	2nd	#37	(Greece) Panagiotis Fasoulas	Portland Trail Blazers
1987	4th	#90	(Greece) Fanis Christodoulou	Atlanta Hawks
1996	1st	#23	(Greece) Efthimios Rentzias	Denver Nuggets
2000	1st	#25	(Greece) - (Georgia (country)) Jake Tsakalidis	Phoenix Suns
2001	2nd	#47	(Greece) Antonis Fotsis	Memphis Grizzlies
2003	2nd	#34	(Greece) Sofoklis Schortsanitis	Los Angeles Clippers
2003	2nd	#58	(Greece) Andreas Glyniadakis	Detroit Pistons
2004	2nd	#50	(Greece) Vassilis Spanoulis	Dallas Mavericks
2006	2nd	#57	(Greece) Loukas Mavrokefalidis	Minnesota Timberwolves
2007	2nd	#58	(Greece) Georgios Printezis	San Antonio Spurs
2008	1st	#23	(Greece) - (United States) Kosta Koufos	Utah Jazz
2009	2nd	#45	(Greece) - (United States) Nick Calathes	Minnesota Timberwolves
2012	2nd	#48	(Greece) Kostas Papanikolaou	New York Knicks
2013	1st	#15	(Greece) Giannis Antetokounmpo	Milwaukee Bucks
2014	2nd	#51	(Greece) Thanasis Antetokounmpo	New York Knicks
2015	2nd	#59	(Greece) Dimitrios Agravanis	Atlanta Hawks
2016	1st	#13	(Greece) Georgios Papagiannis	Phoenix Suns
2017	2nd	#41	(United States) - (Greece) Tyler Dorsey	Atlanta Hawks
2018	2nd	#60	(Greece) Kostas Antetokounmpo	Philadelphia 76ers
2021	2nd	#60	(Greece) Georgios Kalaitzakis	Milwaukee Bucks

== NBA champions ==
Season	Player	Team
1956–57	(United States) - (Greece) Lou Tsioropoulos	Boston Celtics
1958–59	(United States) - (Greece) Lou Tsioropoulos	Boston Celtics
1981–82	(United States) - (Greece) Kurt Rambis	Los Angeles Lakers
1984–85	(United States) - (Greece) Kurt Rambis	Los Angeles Lakers
1986–87	(United States) - (Greece) Kurt Rambis	Los Angeles Lakers
1987–88	(United States) - (Greece) Kurt Rambis	Los Angeles Lakers
2019–20	(Greece) Kostas Antetokounmpo	Los Angeles Lakers
2020–21	(Greece) Giannis Antetokounmpo	Milwaukee Bucks
2020–21	(Greece) Thanasis Antetokounmpo	Milwaukee Bucks

== Former NBA All-Star Game participants ==
Season	Location	Player	Team
2016–17	New Orleans, LA	(Greece) Giannis Antetokounmpo	Milwaukee Bucks
2017–18	Los Angeles, CA	(Greece) Giannis Antetokounmpo	Milwaukee Bucks
2018–19	Charlotte, NC	(Greece) Giannis Antetokounmpo	Milwaukee Bucks
2019–20	Chicago, IL	(Greece) Giannis Antetokounmpo	Milwaukee Bucks
2021–22	Atlanta, GA	(Greece) Giannis Antetokounmpo	Milwaukee Bucks

== Former NBA All-Star Game Contest participants ==
Season	Location	Player	Team	NBA All-Star Game Contest
2013–14	New Orleans, LA	(Greece) Giannis Antetokounmpo	Milwaukee Bucks	NBA All-Star Weekend Skills Challenge
2014–15	New York, NY	(Greece) Giannis Antetokounmpo	Milwaukee Bucks	Slam Dunk Contest

== See also ==
- NBA draft
- List of National Basketball Association players by country
