= List of Turkish NBA players =

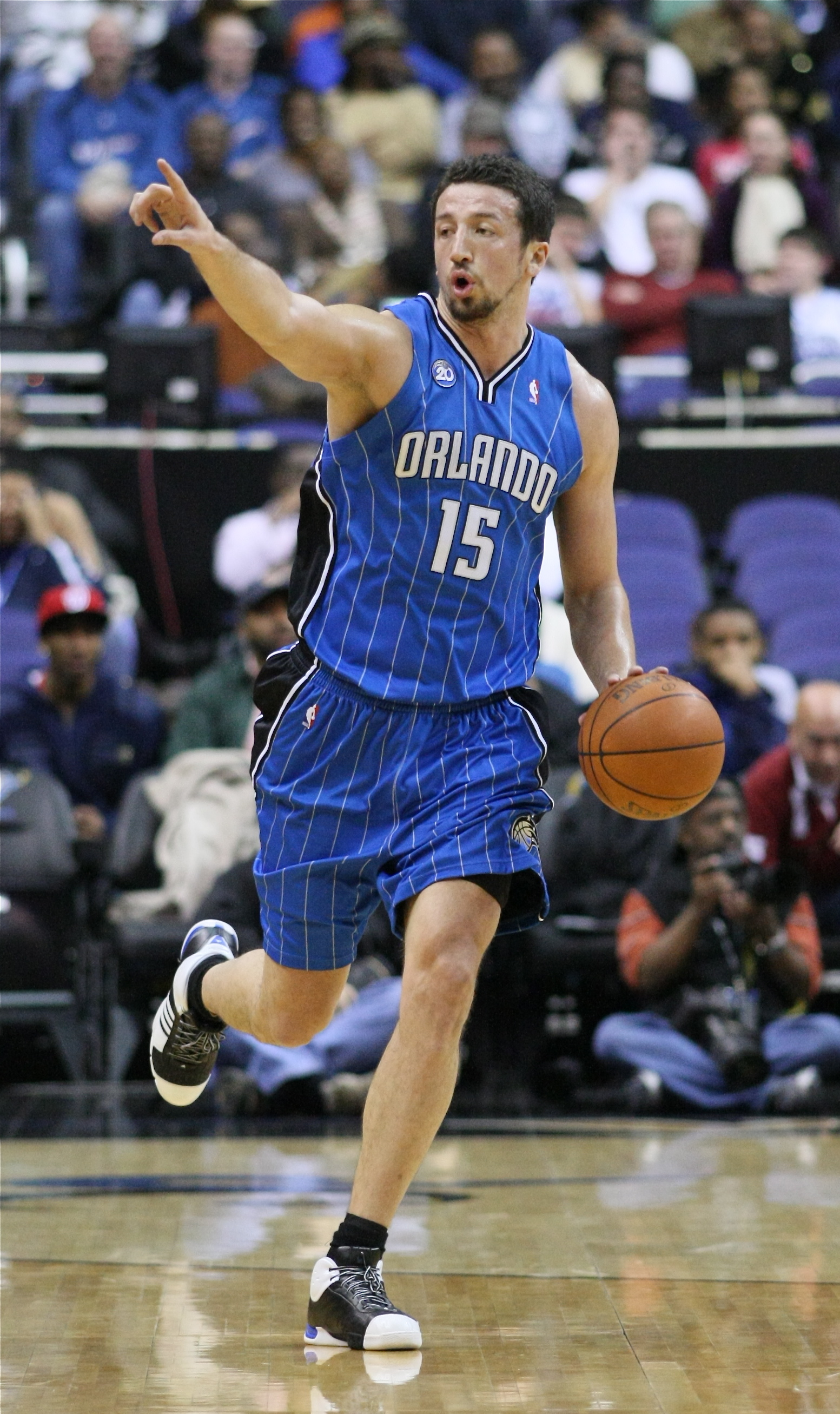
Hedo Türkoğlu has played the highest number of games among all Turkish NBA players.

The following is a list of Turkish players in the National Basketball Association (NBA). This list also includes players who were born outside of Turkey but have represented the national team. Mirsad Türkcan is the first Turkish basketball player to play in the NBA.

== Key ==
Pos.	G	F	C
Position	Guard	Forward	Center

*	Denotes player who is still active in the NBA

== Players ==
Note: Statistics are correct through the end of the 2025–26 season.

Player	Pos.	Team(s) played	Career^{[a]}	Games played		NBA draft		Notes	Ref.
Player	Pos.	Team(s) played	Career^{[a]}	Regular season	Playoffs	Year (pick)	Team	Notes	Ref.
Furkan Aldemir	F/C	Philadelphia 76ers	2014–2016	41	0	2012 (53rd)	Los Angeles Clippers		
Ömer Aşık	C/F	Chicago Bulls; Houston Rockets; New Orleans Pelicans	2010–2012, 2018; 2012–2014; 2014–2018	471	37	2008 (36th)	Portland Trail Blazers		
Onuralp Bitim	G/F	Chicago Bulls	2023–2024	23	0	Undrafted	—		
Adem Bona*	C	Philadelphia 76ers	2024–present	129	10	2024 (41st)	Philadelphia 76ers	Born in Nigeria, moved to Turkey at the age of 13, became a naturalized Turkish citizen, represents Turkey internationally.	
Semih Erden	C	Boston Celtics; Cleveland Cavaliers	2010–2011; 2011–2012	69	0	2008 (60th)	Boston Celtics		
Enes Kanter Freedom	C/F	Utah Jazz; Oklahoma City Thunder; New York Knicks; Portland Trail Blazers; Boston Celtics	2011–2015; 2015–2017; 2017–2019; 2019, 2020–2021; 2019–2020, 2021–2022	748	59	2011 (3rd)	Utah Jazz	Born in Switzerland to Turkish parents, became a naturalized American citizen, represented Turkey internationally.	
Ersan İlyasova	F	Milwaukee Bucks; Detroit Pistons; Orlando Magic; Oklahoma City Thunder; Philadelphia 76ers Atlanta Hawks; Utah Jazz	2005-2007, 2009–2015, 2018–2020; 2015–2016; 2016; 2016; 2016-2017, 2018; 2017-2018; 2021	825	52	2005 (36th)	Milwaukee Bucks		
Furkan Korkmaz	G	Philadelphia 76ers	2017–2024	328	33	2016 (26th)	Philadelphia 76ers		
İbrahim Kutluay	G	Seattle SuperSonics	2004–2005	5	0	Undrafted	—		
Shane Larkin	G	Dallas Mavericks; New York Knicks; Brooklyn Nets; Boston Celtics	2013–2014; 2014–2015; 2015–2016; 2017–2018	256	13	2013 (18th)	Atlanta Hawks	Born in the United States, became a naturalized Turkish citizen, represents Turkey internationally.	
Mehmet Okur	F/C	Detroit Pistons; Utah Jazz; New Jersey Nets	2002–2004; 2004–2011; 2011–2012	634	71	2001 (38th)	Detroit Pistons		
Cedi Osman	F	Cleveland Cavaliers; San Antonio Spurs	2017–2023; 2023–2024	476	19	2015 (31st)	Cleveland Cavaliers	Born in Republic of Macedonia to ethnic Turkish father and Turkish/Bosnian mother, represents Turkey internationally.	
Alperen Şengün*	F/C	Houston Rockets	2021–present	358	13	2021 (16th)	Oklahoma City Thunder		
Mirsad Türkcan	F	New York Knicks; Milwaukee Bucks	1999–2000; 2000	17	2	1998 (18th)	Houston Rockets	Born in SFR Yugoslavia,^{[b]} has represented Turkey internationally.	
Hedo Türkoğlu	F	Sacramento Kings; San Antonio Spurs; Orlando Magic; Toronto Raptors; Phoenix Suns; Los Angeles Clippers	2000–2003; 2003–2004; 2004–2009, 2010–2014; 2009–2010; 2010; 2014–2015	997	109	2000 (16th)	Sacramento Kings		
Ömer Yurtseven*	C	Miami Heat; Utah Jazz Golden State Warriors	2021–2023; 2023–20242025-2026	12	17	Undrafted	—	Born in Uzbekistan to Turkish parents.	
Malachi Flynn	G	Toronto Raptors New York Knicks Detroit Pistons Charlotte Hornets	2020-2023 2023-2024 2024 2025	217	6	2020 (29th)	Toronto Raptors	Born in the United States, became a naturalized Turkish citizen, represents Turkey internationally.	

== Drafted but never played ==
Player	Pos.	NBA draft		Notes	Ref.
Player	Pos.	Year (pick)	Team	Notes	Ref.
Cenk Akyol	F	2005 (59th)	Atlanta Hawks		
Emir Preldžić	G/F	2009 (57th)	Phoenix Suns	Born in SFR Yugoslavia,^{[b]} has represented Turkey internationally.	
İzzet Türkyılmaz	F	2012 (50th)	Denver Nuggets		
İlkan Karaman	F	2012 (57th)	Brooklyn Nets		
Tarik Biberović	F	2023 (56th)	Memphis Grizzlies	Born in Bosnia and Herzegovina, represents Turkey internationally.	

== NBA champions ==
Season	Player	Team
2003–04	Mehmet Okur	Detroit Pistons

== Former NBA All-Star Game participants ==
Season	Location	Player	Team
2007	Paradise, NV	Mehmet Okur	Utah Jazz
2025	San Francisco, CA	Alperen Şengün	Houston Rockets
2026	Los Angeles, CA	Alperen Şengün	Houston Rockets

== See also ==
- List of foreign NBA players

== Notes ==
- ^{a} Each year is linked to an article about that particular NBA season.
- ^{b} Socialist Federal Republic of Yugoslavia dissolved in 1992 into five independent countries, Bosnia and Herzegovina, Croatia, Macedonia, Slovenia, and the Federal Republic of Yugoslavia. FR Yugoslavia was renamed into Serbia and Montenegro in February 2003 and dissolved into two independent countries, Montenegro and Serbia, in June 2006.
