= Hedo Türkoğlu =

Turkish basketball player (born 1979)

- Türkoğlu in 2026

President of the Turkish Basketball Federation
- Incumbent
- Assumed office October 26, 2016
- Preceded by: Harun Erdenay

Chief Advisor to the president of the Republic of Turkey
- Incumbent
- Assumed office March 16, 2016
- President: Recep Tayyip Erdoğan

Personal details
- Born: March 19, 1979 (age 47) Gaziosmanpaşa, Istanbul, Turkey
- Occupation: Basketball player / executive
- Basketball career

Personal information
- Listed height: 6 ft 10 in (2.08 m)
- Listed weight: 220 lb (100 kg)

Career information
- NBA draft: 2000: 1st round, 16th overall pick
- Drafted by: Sacramento Kings
- Playing career: 1996–2015
- Position: Small forward / power forward
- Number: 5, 14, 15, 26, 19, 8

Career history
- 1996–2000: Efes Pilsen
- 2000–2003: Sacramento Kings
- 2003–2004: San Antonio Spurs
- 2004–2009: Orlando Magic
- 2009–2010: Toronto Raptors
- 2010: Phoenix Suns
- 2010–2014: Orlando Magic
- 2014–2015: Los Angeles Clippers

Career highlights
- NBA Most Improved Player (2008); NBA All-Rookie Second Team (2001); Turkish League champion (1997); 2× Turkish Cup champion (1997, 1998); 2× Turkish Presidential Cup champion (1998, 2000)

Career NBA statistics
- Points: 11,022 (11.1 ppg)
- Rebounds: 3,971 (4.0 rpg)
- Assists: 2,832 (2.8 apg)
- Stats at NBA.com
- Stats at Basketball Reference
- FIBA Hall of Fame

Hidayet "Hedo" Türkoğlu (Turkish pronunciation: [hidaːˈjet ˈtyɾkoːɫu]; born March 19, 1979) is a Turkish basketball executive and former professional player. A 6 ft 10 in (2.08 m) forward, Türkoğlu played for six teams in his 15-season career in the National Basketball Association (NBA). He won the NBA's Most Improved Player for the 2007–08 NBA season and played in the NBA Finals for the Magic in 2009. He also played for Turkey's national team in international competition. Türkoğlu has served as president of the Turkish Basketball Federation since October 2016.

== Professional career ==
=== Efes Pilsen (1996–2000) ===
Türkoğlu joined Efes Pilsen (now known as Anadolu Efes) in 1996 and played four seasons with the team. He averaged 8.4 points on 58 percent shooting in 50 games in the EuroLeague. Türkoğlu helped the team reach the 2000 EuroLeague Final Four, averaging 13.6 points, 4.6 rebounds, and 2.7 assists, in 22 games.

=== Sacramento Kings (2000–2003) ===
Türkoğlu was selected by the Sacramento Kings with the 16th pick of the 2000 NBA draft. He was the first Turkish-born player in NBA history. He played alongside other European stars such as Vlade Divac and Peja Stojaković.

Turkoglu received votes for the NBA Sixth Man of the Year Award following the 2001–02 season, when he averaged 10.1 points and 4.5 rebounds per game.

=== San Antonio Spurs (2003–2004) ===
During the 2003 offseason, Türkoğlu was traded to the San Antonio Spurs along with Ron Mercer in a three-team trade. The trade also sent Brad Miller to the Kings and Scot Pollard and Danny Ferry to the Pacers. Türkoğlu played one season with the Spurs and averaged 9.2 points on a career-high 42 percent three-point shooting.

=== Orlando Magic (2004–2009) ===
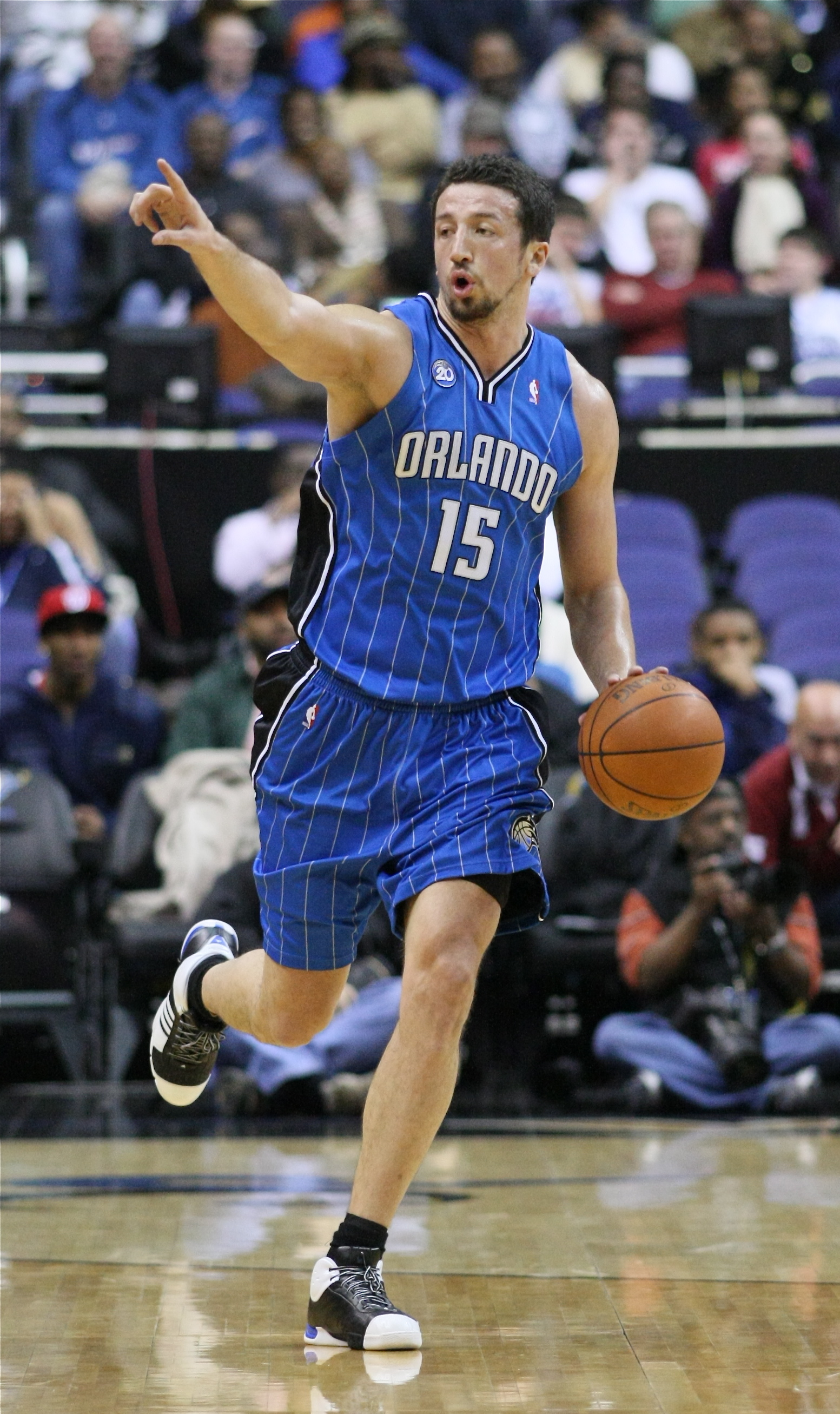
Türkoğlu with the Orlando Magic in 2008

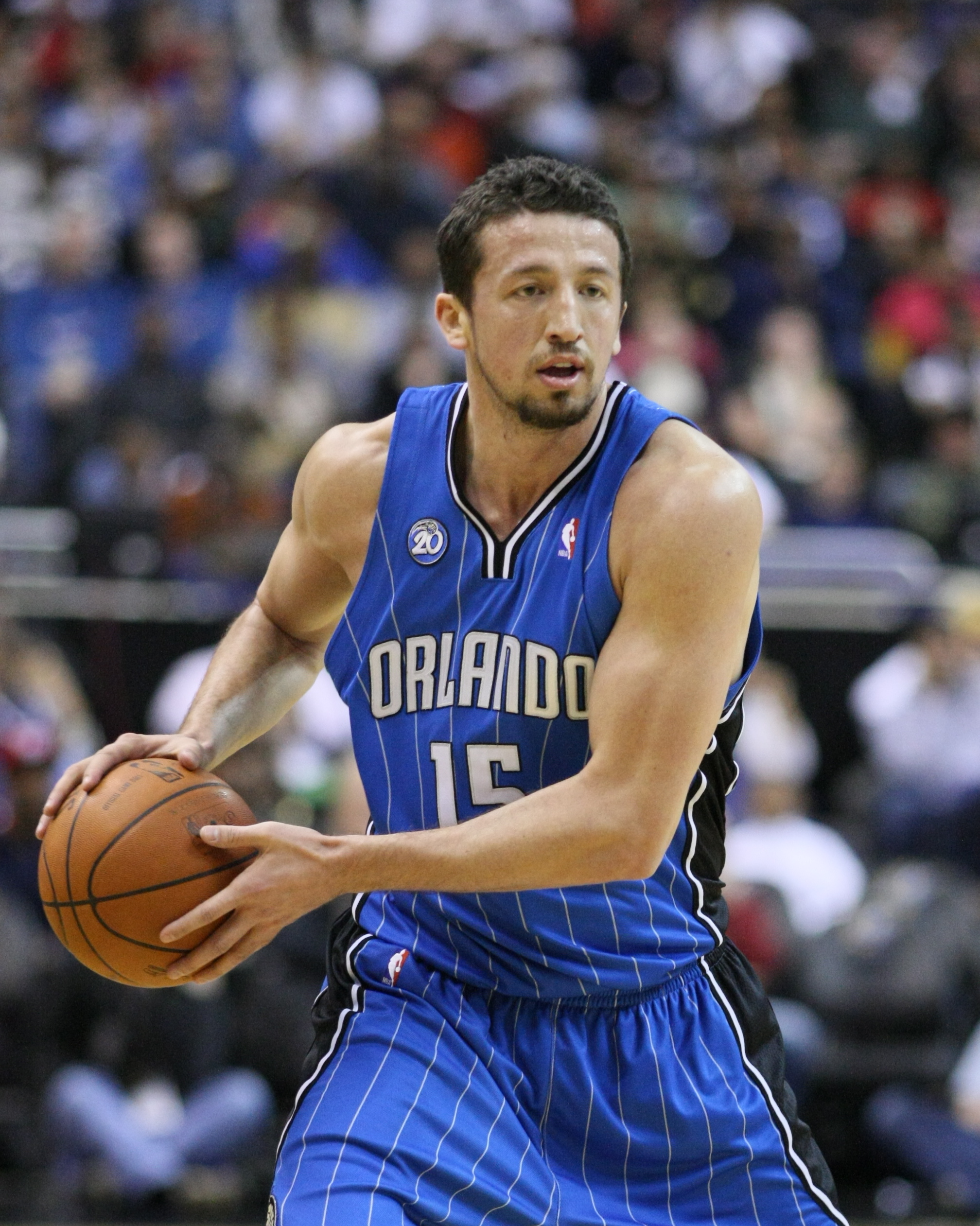
Türkoğlu in an NBA game against the Washington Wizards in November 2008

Türkoğlu joined the Orlando Magic in 2004, signing a six-year, $38 million contract. He scored a career-high 39 points twice: in an April 2007 game against the Toronto Raptors, and in a March 2008 game against the Washington Wizards.

On April 28, 2008, Türkoğlu was named the NBA's Most Improved Player for the 2007–08 NBA season. The Magic won 52 games that season, and Türkoğlu averaged career-highs in points per game (19.5), rebounds per game (5.7), and assists per game (5.0) and started all 82 regular-season games.

In the 2008–09 NBA season, Türkoğlu helped the Magic reach the NBA Finals for the first time since 1995. He led the Magic with 18.0 points per game in the Finals. However, they lost in five games to the Los Angeles Lakers. Türkoğlu decided to opt out of his contract after the season.

=== Toronto Raptors (2009–2010) ===
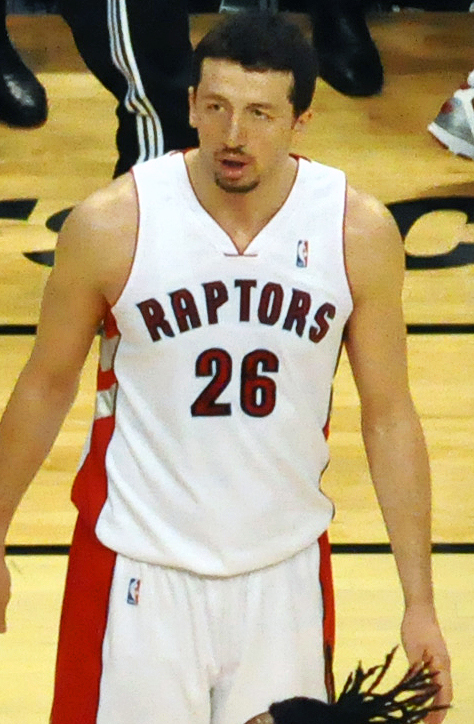
Türkoğlu with the Raptors in 2009

On July 9, 2009, Türkoğlu signed a five-year, $53 million contract and was traded to the Toronto Raptors as a via a four-team sign-and trade deal among the Raptors, Orlando Magic, Dallas Mavericks and Memphis Grizzlies, which also included Shawn Marion. As part of the deal, the Magic received cash considerations from Dallas and Toronto as compensation.

On March 28, 2010, Türkoğlu was a healthy scratch for the Raptors, his first benching since March 10, 2006, when he was still an Orlando Magic player. This was a disciplinary measure, after he was spotted by fans out late in a nightclub in the Yorkville district of Toronto, immediately after missing a game due to a stomach virus. The fans wrote staff within the Raptors organization, who then notified management and coaching staff, leading to the punishment.

On May 29, 2010, Türkoğlu said in a television interview in Turkey that he felt he was wronged by the Raptors' management and wanted to leave Toronto.

=== Phoenix Suns (2010) ===
On July 14, 2010, he was traded to the Phoenix Suns for Leandro Barbosa and Dwayne Jones.

=== Return to Orlando (2010–2014) ===
On December 18, 2010, Türkoğlu was traded back to the Orlando Magic along with Jason Richardson and Earl Clark for Vince Carter, Marcin Gortat, Mickaël Piétrus, a 2011 first-round draft pick, and $3 million cash. On February 13, 2013, Türkoğlu was suspended for 20 games after testing positive for methenolone. Türkoğlu said that he received medicine containing methenolone from a trainer in Turkey, though he did not know it was a banned substance.

On January 3, 2014, Türkoğlu was waived by the Magic. He did not appear for them in the 2013–14 season.

=== Los Angeles Clippers (2014–2015) ===
On January 16, 2014, Türkoğlu signed with the Los Angeles Clippers for the rest of the 2013–14 season. On January 18, he made his Clippers debut. In 13 minutes he recorded 4 points, 2 rebounds and 1 assist in a 92–106 loss to the Indiana Pacers.

On September 12, 2014, he re-signed with the Clippers.

== International career ==
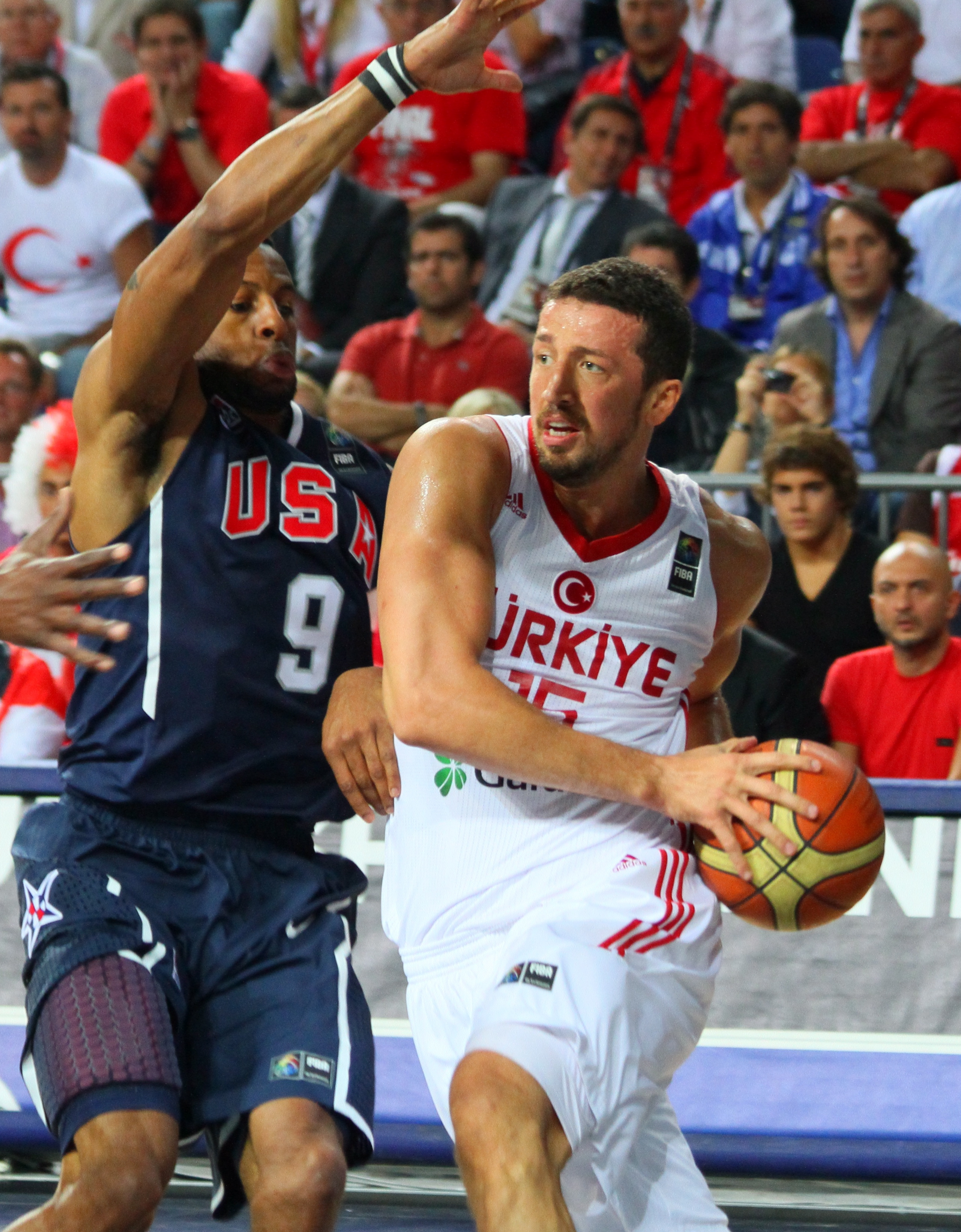
Türkoğlu with the Turkish national team during the 2010 World Championship

Türkoğlu was a member of the Turkish national team which won a silver medal at EuroBasket 2001. He averaged 15.5 points per game in the tournament.

Türkoğlu was named to the preliminary roster for the 2006 World Championship. However, he declined the invitation.

In 2009, Türkoğlu was a member of the Turkish national team which finished in eighth place at the EuroBasket in Poland. One year later, Turkoglu participated in the 2010 FIBA World Championship, in his home country of Turkey. The Turkish national team finished with the silver medal, having beaten every team except for Team USA, the champions. Türkoğlu averaged 12.3 points, 4.2 rebounds, and 3.4 assists per game. At the 2011 EuroBasket, and the 2013 EuroBasket, he averaged 10.6 and 7.3 points per game, respectively.

In March 2014, Türkoğlu retired from international basketball. Türkoğlu was inducted into the FIBA Hall of Fame in 2026.

== NBA career statistics ==
Legend
GP	Games played	GS	Games started	MPG	Minutes per game
FG%	Field goal percentage	3P%	3-point field goal percentage	FT%	Free throw percentage
RPG	Rebounds per game	APG	Assists per game	SPG	Steals per game
BPG	Blocks per game	PPG	Points per game	**Bold**	Career high
*	Led the league

=== Regular season ===
Year	Team	GP	GS	MPG	FG%	3P%	FT%	RPG	APG	SPG	BPG	PPG
2000–01	Sacramento	74	7	16.8	.412	.326	.777	2.8	.9	.7	.3	5.3
2001–02	Sacramento	80	10	24.6	.422	.368	.726	4.5	2.0	.7	.4	10.1
2002–03	Sacramento	67	11	17.5	.422	.372	.800	2.8	1.3	.4	.2	6.7
2003–04	San Antonio	80	44	25.9	.406	.419	.708	4.5	1.9	**1.0**	.4	9.2
2004–05	Orlando	67	11	26.2	.419	.380	.836	3.5	2.3	.6	.3	14.0
2005–06	Orlando	78	59	33.5	.454	.403	**.861**	4.3	2.8	.9	.3	14.9
2006–07	Orlando	73	73	31.1	.419	.388	.781	4.0	3.2	1.0	.2	13.3
2007–08	Orlando	**82***	**82***	**36.9**	**.456**	.400	.829	**5.7**	5.0	.9	.3	**19.5**
2008–09	Orlando	77	77	36.6	.413	.356	.807	5.3	4.9	.8	.2	16.8
2009–10	Toronto	74	69	30.7	.409	.374	.774	4.6	4.1	.7	.4	11.3
2010–11	Phoenix	25	16	25.2	.440	.423	.722	4.0	2.3	.7	**.6**	9.5
2010–11	Orlando	56	56	33.9	.448	.404	.667	4.6	**5.1**	.9	.4	11.4
2011–12	Orlando	53	53	31.2	.415	.353	.705	3.8	4.4	.8	.3	10.9
2012–13	Orlando	11	1	17.2	.264	.042	.500	2.4	2.1	.6	.1	2.9
2013–14	L.A. Clippers	38	0	10.3	.385	**.440**	.500	2.3	.9	.5	.3	3.0
2014–15	L.A. Clippers	62	2	11.4	.441	.432	.545	1.6	.6	.3	.1	3.7
Career		997	571	26.8	.426	.384	.784	4.0	2.8	.8	.3	11.1

=== Playoffs ===
Year	Team	GP	GS	MPG	FG%	3P%	FT%	RPG	APG	SPG	BPG	PPG
2001	Sacramento	8	0	17.6	.435	**.571**	**1.000**	3.5	1.4	.4	.1	7.5
2002	Sacramento	16	8	27.7	.401	.353	.516	5.2	1.4	.4	.6	8.6
2003	Sacramento	10	5	17.4	.360	.286	.722	2.9	1.4	1.2	.5	5.3
2004	San Antonio	10	10	27.1	.321	.333	.611	4.5	1.5	.9	.1	7.7
2007	Orlando	4	4	39.0	**.500**	.333	.500	3.3	3.5	**1.3**	**1.0**	13.8
2008	Orlando	10	10	**39.9**	.447	.286	.848	**6.4**	**5.5**	.8	.2	**17.5**
2009	Orlando	**24**	**24**	38.9	.427	.386	.817	4.5	4.8	.8	.2	15.8
2011	Orlando	6	6	34.8	.294	.233	.571	3.2	3.7	**1.3**	.2	9.2
2012	Orlando	5	5	32.4	.366	.417	.636	2.8	2.4	1.0	.8	8.4
2014	L.A. Clippers	5	0	8.2	.462	.400	.000	1.0	.2	.6	.0	3.2
Career		98	72	29.9	.406	.350	.751	4.2	2.9	.8	.3	10.7

== Post-playing career ==
On November 13, 2015, Türkoğlu announced his retirement after 15 seasons playing in the NBA. He was subsequently appointed CEO of the Turkish Basketball Federation.

On March 15, 2016, the Turkish press reported that President Recep Tayyip Erdoğan appointed Türkoğlu as one of his senior advisers.

== Personal life ==
Türkoğlu was born on March 19, 1979, in the Gaziosmanpaşa district of Istanbul, Turkey. His parents are Bosniaks born in the village of Lažani, in central North Macedonia, and he is fluent in Bosnian. He is a Muslim. After moving to Turkey, his parents changed their surname from Ramićević (Serbian Cyrillic: Рамићевић) to Türkoğlu, which translates as "Son of a Turk". He speaks both Turkish and Serbian fluently.

Türkoğlu and his wife, Banu, welcomed their first daughter in February 2009. The couple's second daughter was born in April 2013.

== See also ==
- List of European basketball players in the United States
- List of Turkish NBA players
- List of people banned or suspended by the NBA
