= List of Lithuanian NBA players =

The following is a list of Lithuanian players in the National Basketball Association (NBA). The list also includes players who were born outside of Lithuania but have represented Lithuanian national team.

== Players ==
Note: Statistics are correct through the end of the 2025–26 season.

Player	Pos.	Team(s) played	Career^{[a]}	Games played		NBA draft		Notes	Ref
Player	Pos.	Team(s) played	Career^{[a]}	Regular season	Playoffs	Year (pick)	Team	Notes	Ref
Martynas Andriuškevičius	C	Cleveland Cavaliers	2005–2006	6	0	2005 (44th)	Orlando Magic	Born in the Soviet Union, represented Lithuania internationally.	
Matas Buzelis	SF	Chicago Bulls	2024–present	157	0	2024 (11th)	Chicago Bulls	Born in the United States to Lithuanian parents, represents Lithuania internationally.	
Ignas Brazdeikis	SF	New York Knicks; Philadelphia 76ers Orlando Magic	2019–2021; 2021; 2021–2022	64	0	2019 (47th)	Sacramento Kings		
Žydrūnas Ilgauskas	C	Cleveland Cavaliers; Miami Heat	1996–2010; 2010–2011	843	80	1996 (20th)	Cleveland Cavaliers	Born in the Soviet Union, represented Lithuania internationally.	
Kasparas Jakučionis	PG/SG	Miami Heat	2025–present	53	0	2025 (20th)	Miami Heat		
Šarūnas Jasikevičius	PG	Indiana Pacers; Golden State Warriors	2005–2007; 2007	138	10	1998	Undrafted	Born in the Soviet Union, represented Lithuania internationally.	
Linas Kleiza	SF/PF	Denver Nuggets; Toronto Raptors	2005–2009; 2010–2013	409	26	2005 (27th)	Portland Trail Blazers	Born in the Soviet Union, represented Lithuania internationally.	
Arnoldas Kulboka	SF/PF	Charlotte Hornets	2021–2022	2	0	2018 (55th)	Charlotte Hornets		
Mindaugas Kuzminskas	SF/PF	New York Knicks	2016–2017	69	0	2011	Undrafted	Born in the Soviet Union, represented Lithuania internationally.	
Arvydas Macijauskas	SG	New Orleans/Oklahoma City Hornets	2005–2006	19	0	2002	Undrafted	Born in the Soviet Union, represented Lithuania internationally.	
Šarūnas Marčiulionis	SG/SF	Golden State Warriors; Seattle SuperSonics; Sacramento Kings; Denver Nuggets	1989–1994; 1994–1995; 1995–1996; 1996–1997	363	17	1987 (127th)	Golden State Warriors	Born in the Soviet Union, represented the Soviet Union and Lithuania internationally.	
Donatas Motiejūnas	PF/C	Houston Rockets; New Orleans Pelicans; San Antonio Spurs	2012–2016; 2017; 2019	251	11	2011 (20th)	Minnesota Timberwolves		
Arvydas Sabonis	C	Portland Trail Blazers	1995–2001; 2002–2003	470	51	1986 (24th)	Portland Trail Blazers	Born in the Soviet Union, represented the Soviet Union and Lithuania internationally.	
Domantas Sabonis	PF/C	Oklahoma City Thunder; Indiana Pacers; Sacramento Kings	2016–2017; 2017–2022; 2022–present	665	20	2016 (11th)	Orlando Magic	Born in the United States to Lithuanian parents, represents Lithuania internationally.	
Deividas Sirvydis	SF/SG	Detroit Pistons	2020–2022	23	0	2019 (37th)	Dallas Mavericks		
Darius Songaila	PF/C	Sacramento Kings; Chicago Bulls; Washington Wizards; New Orleans Hornets; Philadelphia 76ers	2003–2005; 2005–2006; 2006–2009; 2009–2010; 2010–2011	495	21	2002 (50th)	Boston Celtics	Born in the Soviet Union, represented Lithuania internationally.	
Jonas Valančiūnas	C	Toronto Raptors; Memphis Grizzlies; New Orleans Pelicans; Washington Wizards; Sacramento Kings; Denver Nuggets	2012–2019; 2019–2021; 2021–2024; 2024–2025; 2025; 2025–2026	1,002	62	2011 (5th)	Toronto Raptors		

== Drafted but never played ==
Player	Pos	NBA draft		Notes	Ref
Player	Pos	Year (pick)	Team	Notes	Ref
Artūras Gudaitis	C	2015 (47th)	Philadelphia 76ers		
Robertas Javtokas	C	2001 (55th)	San Antonio Spurs	Born in the Soviet Union, represented Lithuania internationally.	
Rokas Jokubaitis	PG	2021 (34th)	Oklahoma City Thunder		
Renaldas Seibutis	SG	2007 (50th)	Dallas Mavericks	Born in the Soviet Union, represented Lithuania internationally.	
Eurelijus Žukauskas	C	1995 (54th)	Seattle SuperSonics	Born in the Soviet Union, represented Lithuania internationally.	

== See also ==
- Basketball in Lithuania
