= 2020–21 Euroleague Basketball Next Generation Tournament =

ANGT
- Season: 2020–21
- Duration: 27 December 2020–6 June 2021
- Teams: 24

Regular season
- Season MVP: (Spain) Eli Ndiaye (Real Madrid)

Finals
- Champions: (Spain) Real Madrid
- Runners-up: (Spain) Barcelona

The 2020–21 Euroleague Basketball Next Generation Tournament, also called Adidas Next Generation Tournament by sponsorship reasons, is the 19th edition of the international junior basketball tournament organized by Euroleague Basketball.

== Teams ==
In this edition, the number of the participating under-18 teams was reduced to 24. They will play in three qualifying tournaments between December 2020 and February 2021. CFBB Paris was supposed to participate, but was replaced by Tofaş Bursa.

(Spain) Casademont Zaragoza	(Spain) Valencia Basket	(Serbia) Partizan NIS	(Russia) Lokomotiv Kuban
(Spain) Barcelona	(Turkey) Tofaş	(France) LDLC ASVEL	(Czech Republic) Basket Brno
(Spain) Herbalife Gran Canaria	(Turkey) Anadolu Efes	(France) Nanterre 92	(Lithuania) Žalgiris
(Spain) Joventut	(Turkey) Fenerbahçe Beko	(Montenegro) Budućnost VOLI Podgorica	(Israel) Maccabi Tel Aviv
(Spain) Real Madrid	(Serbia) Crvena zvezda mts	(Italy) Stella Azzurra	(Germany) ratiopharm Ulm
(Spain) Unicaja	(Serbia) Mega Soccerbet	(Slovenia) Cedevita Olimpija	(Romania) U-BT Cluj-Napoca

== Qualifying tournaments ==
=== Valencia, Spain ===
Spain
- 27–29 December 2020

The first qualifying tournament featured hosts Valencia Basket, 2015–2016 champions Barcelona, Herbalife Gran Canaria, Unicaja, Joventut, all from Spain, LDLC ASVEL and Nanterre 92 from France, and ratiopharm Ulm from Germany. Barcelona defeated Joventut 79–55 in the final and advanced to the final tournament.

==== Group A ====
Pos	Team	Pld	W	L	PF	PA	PD	Qualification
1	(Spain) Barcelona	3	3	0	233	147	+86	Final
2	(Germany) ratiopharm Ulm	3	2	1	187	169	+18	3rd place game
3	(Spain) Herbalife Gran Canaria	3	1	2	177	207	−30	5th place game
4	(France) Nanterre 92	3	0	3	154	228	−74	7th place game

Source: adidasngt.com

27 December 2020
10:00 CET

Boxscore

ratiopharm Ulm (Germany)	50–59	(Spain) Barcelona
Scoring by quarter: 11–14, 18–14, 15–13, 6–18
Pts: Sochan 16; Rebs: Sochan 16; Asts: Ensminger 4		Pts: Bonilla 14; Rebs: Nnaji 9 Asts: Bonilla, Caicedo 5

L'Alqueria del Basket, Valencia
Attendance: 0 (tentative)
Referees: Neutral

27 December 2020
12:00 CET

Boxscore

Herbalife Gran Canaria (Spain)	72–52	(France) Nanterre 92
Scoring by quarter: 19–9, 19–15, 12–11, 22–17
Pts: Tchanda 17; Rebs: Pinedo 8 Asts: Montero 7		Pts: Raynaud 13; Rebs: Raynaud, Amdy 8 Asts: three players 2

L'Alqueria del Basket, Valencia
Attendance: 0 (tentative)
Referees: Neutral

27 December 2020
18:00 CET

Boxscore

Barcelona (Spain)	85–47	(Spain) Herbalife Gran Canaria
Scoring by quarter: 27–16, 21–12, 20–6, 17–13
Pts: Granja, Ganal 12; Rebs: Simić 8 Asts: Villar 9		Pts: Brito 16; Rebs: Tchanda 11; Asts: Montero 3

L'Alqueria del Basket, Valencia
Attendance: 0 (tentative)
Referees: Neutral

27 December 2020
20:00 CET

Boxscore

ratiopharm Ulm (Germany)	67–52	(France) Nanterre 92
Scoring by quarter: 17–10, 15–14, 12–15, 23–13
Pts: Sochan 16; Rebs: Sochan, Ensminger 8 Asts: Jensen 4		Pts: Raynaud 17; Rebs: Raynaud 12; Asts: Loemba 4

L'Alqueria del Basket, Valencia
Attendance: 0 (tentative)
Referees: Neutral

28 December 2020
14:00 CET

Boxscore

Barcelona (Spain)	89–50	(France) Nanterre 92
Scoring by quarter: 18–13, 26–16, 32–10, 13–11
Pts: Caicedo 18; Rebs: Villar 7 Asts: Granja 4		Pts: Loemba 17; Rebs: Raynaud 9 Asts: Loemba, Donnadieu 3

L'Alqueria del Basket, Valencia
Attendance: 0 (tentative)
Referees: Neutral

28 December 2020
16:00 CET

Boxscore

Herbalife Gran Canaria (Spain)	58–70	(Germany) ratiopharm Ulm
Scoring by quarter: 12–18, 13–19, 17–17, 16–16
Pts: Tchanda 13; Rebs: Pinedo 11; Asts: Brito 6		Pts: Grbović 17; Rebs: Sochan 17; Asts: Ensminger, Hanzalek 3

L'Alqueria del Basket, Valencia
Attendance: 0 (tentative)
Referees: Neutral

==== Group B ====
Pos	Team	Pld	W	L	PF	PA	PD	Qualification
1	(Spain) Joventut	3	3	0	213	186	+27	Final
2	(Spain) Unicaja	3	2	1	193	182	+11	3rd place game
3	(France) LDLC ASVEL	3	1	2	217	203	+14	5th place game
4	(Spain) Valencia Basket	3	0	3	196	248	−52	7th place game

Source: adidasngt.com

27 December 2020
14:00 CET

Boxscore

Joventut (Spain)	67–57	(France) LDLC ASVEL
Scoring by quarter: 13–18, 18–6, 17–19, 19–14
Pts: Allen 19; Rebs: Allen 15; Asts: Martínez 4		Pts: Houinsou 17; Rebs: Houinsou 11; Asts: Houinsou, Doualla 3

L'Alqueria del Basket, Valencia
Attendance: 0 (tentative)
Referees: Neutral

27 December 2020
16:00 CET

Boxscore

Valencia Basket (Spain)	56–68	(Spain) Unicaja
Scoring by quarter: 26–19, 14–18, 10–21, 6–10
Pts: Bagatskis 19; Rebs: Sáez 9 Asts: Marí 3		Pts: Sené 14; Rebs: Sené 13; Asts: Santos 5

L'Alqueria del Basket, Valencia
Attendance: 0 (tentative)
Referees: Neutral

28 December 2020
10:00 CET

Boxscore

LDLC ASVEL (France)	94–66	(Spain) Valencia Basket
Scoring by quarter: 28–18, 21–15, 26–9, 19–24
Pts: Malwaya 24; Rebs: Houinsou, Manet 8 Asts: Houinsou 8		Pts: Marcó 11; Rebs: Bagatskis 6 Asts: De Larrea, Marí 4

L'Alqueria del Basket, Valencia
Attendance: 0 (tentative)
Referees: Neutral

28 December 2020
12:00 CET

Boxscore

Joventut (Spain)	60–55	(Spain) Unicaja
Scoring by quarter: 10–16, 24–16, 12–13, 14–10
Pts: Martínez 14; Rebs: Montero, De Oliveira 7 Asts: Martínez 5		Pts: Edokpayi 18; Rebs: Santos, Shelist 7 Asts: Santos 5

L'Alqueria del Basket, Valencia
Attendance: 0 (tentative)
Referees: Neutral

28 December 2020
18:00 CET

Boxscore

Valencia Basket (Spain)	74–86	(Spain) Joventut
Scoring by quarter: 17–22, 19–26, 22–20, 16–18
Pts: Bagatskis 17; Rebs: Marí, Sáez 9 Asts: Marí 5		Pts: Ramos 15; Rebs: Vázquez 9 Asts: Montero, Nogues 6

L'Alqueria del Basket, Valencia
Attendance: 0 (tentative)
Referees: Neutral

28 December 2020
20:00 CET

Boxscore

LDLC ASVEL (France)	66–70	(Spain) Unicaja
Scoring by quarter: 17–21, 12–14, 15–13, 22–22
Pts: Risacher 18; Rebs: Risacher, Kasiama 7 Asts: Houinsou 5		Pts: Edokpayi 14; Rebs: Tanchyn 8 Asts: Tamba 5

L'Alqueria del Basket, Valencia
Attendance: 0 (tentative)
Referees: Neutral

==== 7th place game ====
29 December 2020
10:00 CET

Boxscore

Nanterre 92 (France)	80–88	(Spain) Valencia Basket
Scoring by quarter: 21–26, 21–16, 22–24, 16–22
Pts: Ngufor 20; Rebs: Raynaud 18; Asts: Loemba 5		Pts: Alexandrov 22; Rebs: Sáez 11; Asts: Sáez, Marí 4

L'Alqueria del Basket, Valencia
Attendance: 0 (tentative)
Referees: Neutral

==== 5th place game ====
29 December 2020
12:00 CET

Boxscore

Herbalife Gran Canaria (Spain)	69–53	(France) LDLC ASVEL
Scoring by quarter: 22–14, 21–15, 12–15, 14–9
Pts: Tchanda 19; Rebs: Tchanda 13; Asts: Montero, Brito 4		Pts: Risacher, Manet 12; Rebs: Manet 9 Asts: Houinsou, Desseignet 5

L'Alqueria del Basket, Valencia
Attendance: 0 (tentative)
Referees: Neutral

==== 3rd place game ====
29 December 2020
14:00 CET

Boxscore

ratiopharm Ulm (Germany)	69–65	(Spain) Unicaja
Scoring by quarter: 15–13, 14–13, 19–15, 21–24
Pts: Sochan 15; Rebs: Sochan 10; Asts: Sochan 4		Pts: Tanchyn 15; Rebs: Tanchyn 10; Asts: Santos 6

L'Alqueria del Basket, Valencia
Attendance: 0 (tentative)
Referees: Neutral

==== Final ====
29 December 2020
16:00 CET

Boxscore

Barcelona (Spain)	79–55	(Spain) Joventut
Scoring by quarter: 17–14, 15–12, 22–14, 25–15
Pts: Caicedo 29; Rebs: Bonilla 11; Asts: Bonilla 4		Pts: Allen 22; Rebs: Allen 10; Asts: Vázquez 4

L'Alqueria del Basket, Valencia
Attendance: 0 (tentative)
Referees: Neutral

==== Final ranking ====
Qualified to the Final tournament

Rank	Team
1	(Spain) Barcelona
2	(Spain) Joventut
3	(Germany) ratiopharm Ulm
4	(Spain) Unicaja
5	(Spain) Herbalife Gran Canaria
6	(France) LDLC ASVEL
7	(Spain) Valencia Basket
8	(France) Nanterre 92

=== Istanbul, Turkey ===
Turkey
- 19–21 March 2021

The second qualifying tournament featured hosts Fenerbahçe Beko and Anadolu Efes, as well as Tofaş Bursa, all from Turkey, the 2018–19 champions Real Madrid and Casademont Zaragoza from Spain, Stella Azzurra from Italy, Žalgiris from Lithuania and Basket Brno from Czech Republic. Real Madrid won 85–77 against Stella Azzurra to advance to the final tournament.

==== Group A ====
Pos	Team	Pld	W	L	PF	PA	PD	Qualification
1	(Italy) Stella Azzurra	3	3	0	241	188	+53	Final
2	(Turkey) Anadolu Efes	3	2	1	227	217	+10	3rd place game
3	(Spain) Casademont Zaragoza	3	1	2	203	232	−29	5th place game
4	(Czech Republic) Basket Brno	3	0	3	204	238	−34	7th place game

Source: adidasngt.com

19 March 2021
11:00 TRT

Boxscore

Anadolu Efes (Turkey)	83–68	(Spain) Casademont Zaragoza
Scoring by quarter: 16–16, 14–12, 26–22, 27–18
Pts: Güneş, Tekin 14; Rebs: Efeoğlu 11; Asts: Yılmaz 8		Pts: Mara 18; Rebs: Mara 14; Asts: Cera 5

Anadolu Efes Sports Center, Istanbul
Attendance: 0 (tentative)
Referees: Neutral

19 March 2021
13:00 TRT

Boxscore

Basket Brno (Czech Republic)	65–82	(Italy) Stella Azzurra
Scoring by quarter: 20–29, 16–14, 11–22, 18–17
Pts: Nečas 13; Rebs: Nečas 9 Asts: Nečas 5		Pts: Giordano, Marchiaro 18; Rebs: Visintin 9 Asts: Pugliatti 4

Anadolu Efes Sports Center, Istanbul
Attendance: 0 (tentative)
Referees: Neutral

19 March 2021
19:00 TRT

Boxscore

Basket Brno (Czech Republic)	80–83	(Turkey) Anadolu Efes
Scoring by quarter: 17–22, 16–17, 20–27, 27–17
Pts: Křivánek, Husták 15; Rebs: Nečas 10; Asts: Křivánek 5		Pts: Türk 22; Rebs: Hamatoğlu 13; Asts: Yılmaz 13

Anadolu Efes Sports Center, Istanbul
Attendance: 0 (tentative)
Referees: Neutral

19 March 2021
21:00 TRT

Boxscore

Stella Azzurra (Italy)	90–62	(Spain) Casademont Zaragoza
Scoring by quarter: 23–14, 22–21, 24–13, 21–14
Pts: Giordano 17; Rebs: Pugliatti 6 Asts: three players 4		Pts: Langarita 15; Rebs: Knudsen 7 Asts: Arjol 5

Anadolu Efes Sports Center, Istanbul
Attendance: 0 (tentative)
Referees: Neutral

20 March 2021
14:00 TRT

Boxscore

Casademont Zaragoza (Spain)	73–59	(Czech Republic) Basket Brno
Scoring by quarter: 16–13, 10–20, 21–18, 26–8
Pts: Cera 20; Rebs: Mara 10; Asts: Aso 3		Pts: Husták 14; Rebs: Husták, Nečas 9 Asts: Nečas 6

Anadolu Efes Sports Center, Istanbul
Attendance: 0 (tentative)
Referees: Neutral

20 March 2021
16:00 TRT

Boxscore

Anadolu Efes (Turkey)	61–69	(Italy) Stella Azzurra
Scoring by quarter: 9–20, 8–17, 21–25, 23–7
Pts: Türk, Efeoğlu 12; Rebs: Efeoğlu 7 Asts: Kay 4		Pts: Visintin 17; Rebs: Jocys 8 Asts: three players 4

Anadolu Efes Sports Center, Istanbul
Attendance: 0 (tentative)
Referees: Neutral

==== Group B ====
Pos	Team	Pld	W	L	PF	PA	PD	Qualification
1	(Spain) Real Madrid	3	3	0	284	172	+112	Final
2	(Lithuania) Žalgiris	3	2	1	224	209	+15	3rd place game
3	(Turkey) Fenerbahçe Beko	3	1	2	186	257	−71	5th place game
4	(Turkey) Tofaş	3	0	3	178	234	−56	7th place game

Source: adidasngt.com

19 March 2021
15:00 TRT

Boxscore

Real Madrid (Spain)	89–60	(Turkey) Tofaş
Scoring by quarter: 27–17, 24–15, 19–11, 19–17
Pts: Klavžar 14; Rebs: Ndiaye, Silva-Brito 8 Asts: Núñez 6		Pts: Demir 19; Rebs: Demir 10; Asts: Peksarı 5

Anadolu Efes Sports Center, Istanbul
Attendance: 0 (tentative)
Referees: Neutral

19 March 2021
17:00 TRT

Boxscore

Fenerbahçe Beko (Turkey)	69–84	(Lithuania) Žalgiris
Scoring by quarter: 11–18, 18–15, 10–32, 30–19
Pts: Bayrak 15; Rebs: Merdoğlu 6 Asts: Yılmaz 5		Pts: Butka 15; Rebs: Krivas 13; Asts: Kneižys 8

Anadolu Efes Sports Center, Istanbul
Attendance: 0 (tentative)
Referees: Neutral

20 March 2021
10:00 TRT

Boxscore

Tofaş (Turkey)	59–76	(Lithuania) Žalgiris
Scoring by quarter: 17–21, 21–20, 11–16, 10–19
Pts: Demir 17; Rebs: Demir 13; Asts: Peksarı 4		Pts: Lelevičius 17; Rebs: Krivas 7 Asts: Kneižys 5

Anadolu Efes Sports Center, Istanbul
Attendance: 0 (tentative)
Referees: Neutral

20 March 2021
12:00 TRT

Boxscore

Fenerbahçe Beko (Turkey)	48–114	(Spain) Real Madrid
Scoring by quarter: 8–30, 17–23, 4–29, 19–32
Pts: Deniz 10; Rebs: Öztekin 3 Asts: Yılmaz, Yetkin 3		Pts: Spagnolo 14; Rebs: Veesaar 13; Asts: Spagnolo 6

Anadolu Efes Sports Center, Istanbul
Attendance: 0 (tentative)
Referees: Neutral

20 March 2021
18:00 TRT

Boxscore

Tofaş (Turkey)	59–69	(Turkey) Fenerbahçe Beko
Scoring by quarter: 22–20, 12–12, 9–21, 16–16
Pts: Demir 14; Rebs: Büyüktuncel 9 Asts: Peksarı 6		Pts: Aslan 14; Rebs: Öztekin 12; Asts: Yılmaz 8

Anadolu Efes Sports Center, Istanbul
Attendance: 0 (tentative)
Referees: Neutral

20 March 2021
20:00 TRT

Boxscore

Žalgiris (Lithuania)	64–81	(Spain) Real Madrid
Scoring by quarter: 17–21, 12–25, 18–23, 17–12
Pts: Lelevičius 20; Rebs: Lelevičius, Jaruševičius 9 Asts: Kneižys 4		Pts: Spagnolo 19; Rebs: Ndiaye 9 Asts: Spagnolo, Núñez 7

Anadolu Efes Sports Center, Istanbul
Attendance: 0 (tentative)
Referees: Neutral

==== 7th place game ====
21 March 2021
10:00 TRT

Boxscore

Basket Brno (Czech Republic)	71–66 (OT)	(Turkey) Tofaş
Scoring by quarter: 14–13, 14–20, 14–17, 17–9, Overtime: 12–7
Pts: Husták 20; Rebs: Husták 14; Asts: Husták 4		Pts: three players 11; Rebs: Demirci 8 Asts: Peksarı 7

Anadolu Efes Sports Center, Istanbul
Attendance: 0 (tentative)
Referees: Neutral

==== 5th place game ====
21 March 2021
12:00 TRT

Boxscore

Casademont Zaragoza (Spain)	97–89 (OT)	(Turkey) Fenerbahçe Beko
Scoring by quarter: 23–20, 20–12, 18–10, 18–37, Overtime: 18–10
Pts: Arjol 19; Rebs: Mara 14; Asts: Cera, Aso 5		Pts: Güçoğlu 22; Rebs: Öztekin 10; Asts: Aslan 9

Anadolu Efes Sports Center, Istanbul
Attendance: 0 (tentative)
Referees: Neutral

==== 3rd place game ====
21 March 2021
14:00 TRT

Boxscore

Anadolu Efes (Turkey)	79–97	(Lithuania) Žalgiris
Scoring by quarter: 24–15, 22–27, 19–23, 14–32
Pts: Hamatoğlu 18; Rebs: Türk 7 Asts: Yılmaz 7		Pts: Lelevičius 27; Rebs: Krivas 10; Asts: Kneižys 5

Anadolu Efes Sports Center, Istanbul
Attendance: 0 (tentative)
Referees: Neutral

==== Final ====
21 March 2021
16:00 TRT

Boxscore

Stella Azzurra (Italy)	77–85	(Spain) Real Madrid
Scoring by quarter: 18–15, 25–22, 8–24, 26–24
Pts: Giordano 21; Rebs: Ndzie, Innocenti 6 Asts: Giordano 5		Pts: Ndiaye 28; Rebs: Ndiaye 11; Asts: Núñez 6

Anadolu Efes Sports Center, Istanbul
Attendance: 0 (tentative)
Referees: Neutral

==== Final ranking ====
Qualified to the Final tournament

Rank	Team
1	(Spain) Real Madrid
2	(Italy) Stella Azzurra
3	(Lithuania) Žalgiris
4	(Turkey) Anadolu Efes
5	(Spain) Casademont Zaragoza
6	(Turkey) Fenerbahçe Beko
7	(Czech Republic) Basket Brno
8	(Turkey) Tofaş

=== Belgrade, Serbia ===
Serbia
- 26–28 March 2021

The third qualifying tournament featured hosts Crvena zvezda mts, Partizan NIS and Mega Soccerbet, as well as Budućnost VOLI Podgorica from Montenegro, Cedevita Olimpija from Slovenia, Lokomotiv Kuban from Russia, Maccabi Tel Aviv from Israel and U-BT Cluj-Napoca from Romania. Mega Soccerbet won 82–80 against Crvena zvezda mts to advance to the final tournament.

==== Group A ====
Pos	Team	Pld	W	L	PF	PA	PD	Qualification
1	(Serbia) Crvena zvezda mts	3	3	0	238	174	+64	Final
2	(Serbia) Partizan NIS	3	2	1	249	241	+8	3rd place game
3	(Israel) Maccabi Tel Aviv	3	1	2	227	243	−16	5th place game
4	(Romania) U-BT Cluj-Napoca	3	0	3	199	255	−56	7th place game

Source: adidasngt.com

26 March 2021
10:00 CET

Boxscore

Crvena zvezda mts (Serbia)	89–53	(Romania) U-BT Cluj-Napoca
Scoring by quarter: 25–12, 22–16, 20–12, 22–13
Pts: Radaković 17; Rebs: Matović 6 Asts: five players 4		Pts: Lungu 18; Rebs: Lungu, Diaby 9 Asts: Marinău 7

Železnik Hall, Belgrade
Attendance: 0 (tentative)
Referees: Neutral

26 March 2021
12:00 CET

Boxscore

Maccabi Tel Aviv (Israel)	88–101 (OT)	(Serbia) Partizan NIS
Scoring by quarter: 24–21, 29–16, 17–27, 11–17, Overtime: 7–20
Pts: Menchel 24; Rebs: Levin 9 Asts: Menchel 9		Pts: Jovanović 36; Rebs: Tahmaz 11; Asts: Popović 6

Železnik Hall, Belgrade
Attendance: 0 (tentative)
Referees: Neutral

26 March 2021
18:00 CET

Boxscore

Crvena zvezda mts (Serbia)	69–57	(Israel) Maccabi Tel Aviv
Scoring by quarter: 25–3, 15–15, 17–21, 12–18
Pts: Šaranović 22; Rebs: Matović, Branković 8 Asts: Matović, Vukas 5		Pts: Menchel 17; Rebs: Levin 8 Asts: Menchel, Iluz 3

Železnik Hall, Belgrade
Attendance: 0 (tentative)
Referees: Neutral

26 March 2021
20:00 CET

Boxscore

U-BT Cluj-Napoca (Romania)	73–84	(Serbia) Partizan NIS
Scoring by quarter: 14–20, 20–17, 25–21, 14–26
Pts: Marinău 16; Rebs: Diaby 12; Asts: three players 3		Pts: Vukčević 21; Rebs: Milenković 11; Asts: Popović 6

Železnik Hall, Belgrade
Attendance: 0 (tentative)
Referees: Neutral

27 March 2021
14:00 CET

Boxscore

Maccabi Tel Aviv (Israel)	82–73	(Romania) U-BT Cluj-Napoca
Scoring by quarter: 9–14, 28–16, 23–25, 22–18
Pts: Iluz 23; Rebs: Levin 9 Asts: Menchel 10		Pts: Grasu 24; Rebs: Grasu 13; Asts: Lungu 7

Železnik Hall, Belgrade
Attendance: 0 (tentative)
Referees: Neutral

27 March 2021
16:00 CET

Boxscore

Partizan NIS (Serbia)	64–80	(Serbia) Crvena zvezda mts
Scoring by quarter: 11–18, 19–21, 18–28, 16–13
Pts: Jovanović 13; Rebs: Jovanović 9 Asts: Popović 6		Pts: Branković 22; Rebs: Šaranović 11; Asts: Šaranović, Vukas 4

Železnik Hall, Belgrade
Attendance: 0 (tentative)
Referees: Neutral

==== Group B ====
Pos	Team	Pld	W	L	PF	PA	PD	Qualification
1	(Serbia) Mega Soccerbet	3	3	0	291	223	+68	Final
2	(Montenegro) Budućnost VOLI Podgorica	3	2	1	254	264	−10	3rd place game
3	(Slovenia) Cedevita Olimpija	3	1	2	232	255	−23	5th place game
4	(Russia) Lokomotiv Kuban	3	0	3	222	257	−35	7th place game

Source: adidasngt.com

26 March 2021
14:00 CET

Boxscore

Cedevita Olimpija (Slovenia)	77–97	(Serbia) Mega Soccerbet
Scoring by quarter: 18–32, 24–24, 18–23, 17–18
Pts: Jelavić 21; Rebs: Skelin 8 Asts: Jovanović 6		Pts: Jović 31; Rebs: Jović 12; Asts: Labović 8

Železnik Hall, Belgrade
Attendance: 0 (tentative)
Referees: Neutral

26 March 2021
16:00 CET

Boxscore

Budućnost VOLI Podgorica (Montenegro)	88–84	(Russia) Lokomotiv Kuban
Scoring by quarter: 21–20, 18–17, 28–23, 21–24
Pts: Žugić 25; Rebs: Ivišić 15; Asts: Žugić 5		Pts: Kuzmenko 23; Rebs: Niagu 10; Asts: Evdokimov 7

Železnik Hall, Belgrade
Attendance: 0 (tentative)
Referees: Neutral

27 March 2021
10:00 CET

Boxscore

Mega Soccerbet (Serbia)	98–71	(Russia) Lokomotiv Kuban
Scoring by quarter: 30–15, 27–19, 27–19, 14–18
Pts: Jović, Djurišić 21; Rebs: Jović 8 Asts: Djurišić 6		Pts: Kuzmenko 19; Rebs: Kuzmenko 8 Asts: Niagu 3

Železnik Hall, Belgrade
Attendance: 0 (tentative)
Referees: Neutral

27 March 2021
12:00 CET

Boxscore

Cedevita Olimpija (Slovenia)	84–91	(Montenegro) Budućnost VOLI Podgorica
Scoring by quarter: 23–14, 16–31, 22–19, 23–27
Pts: Jelavić 21; Rebs: Jelavić, Matleković 9 Asts: Jovanović 12		Pts: Ivišić 29; Rebs: Ivišić 17; Asts: Ivanović 9

Železnik Hall, Belgrade
Attendance: 0 (tentative)
Referees: Neutral

27 March 2021
18:00 CET

Boxscore

Lokomotiv Kuban (Russia)	67–71	(Slovenia) Cedevita Olimpija
Scoring by quarter: 15–22, 22–22, 20–15, 10–12
Pts: Sheianov 19; Rebs: Kuzmenko, Niagu 7 Asts: Vedishchev 8		Pts: Jovanović 18; Rebs: Skelin 10; Asts: Jovanović 7

Železnik Hall, Belgrade
Attendance: 0 (tentative)
Referees: Neutral

27 March 2021
20:00 CET

Boxscore

Budućnost VOLI Podgorica (Montenegro)	75–96	(Serbia) Mega Soccerbet
Scoring by quarter: 16–28, 27–23, 11–31, 21–14
Pts: Büyükcangaz 16; Rebs: Ivišić, Ivanović 8 Asts: Ivanović 7		Pts: Jović 33; Rebs: Jović 9 Asts: Djurišić 9

Železnik Hall, Belgrade
Attendance: 0 (tentative)
Referees: Neutral

==== 7th place game ====
28 March 2021
12:00 CET

Boxscore

U-BT Cluj-Napoca (Romania)	67–71	(Russia) Lokomotiv Kuban
Scoring by quarter: 13–17, 14–25, 22–15, 18–14
Pts: Lungu 19; Rebs: Diaby 9 Asts: Marinău 6		Pts: Vedishchev 18; Rebs: Niagu 11; Asts: Volkov 5

Železnik Hall, Belgrade
Attendance: 0 (tentative)
Referees: Neutral

==== 5th place game ====
28 March 2021
14:00 CET

Boxscore

Maccabi Tel Aviv (Israel)	79–75	(Slovenia) Cedevita Olimpija
Scoring by quarter: 23–24, 19–18, 17–15, 20–18
Pts: Menchel 23; Rebs: Levin 6 Asts: Menchel 7		Pts: Jelavić 22; Rebs: Skelin 10; Asts: Damjanić 10

Železnik Hall, Belgrade
Attendance: 0 (tentative)
Referees: Neutral

==== 3rd place game ====
28 March 2021
16:00 CET

Boxscore

Partizan NIS (Serbia)	79–67	(Montenegro) Budućnost VOLI Podgorica
Scoring by quarter: 26–14, 17–20, 23–18, 13–15
Pts: Vukčević 21; Rebs: Vukčević, Vučić 9 Asts: Popović 9		Pts: Ivišić 24; Rebs: Ivišić 11; Asts: Ivanović 6

Železnik Hall, Belgrade
Attendance: 0 (tentative)
Referees: Neutral

==== Final ====
28 March 2021
20:00 CET

Boxscore

Crvena zvezda mts (Serbia)	80–82	(Serbia) Mega Soccerbet
Scoring by quarter: 24–18, 22–14, 22–27, 12–23
Pts: Matović 23; Rebs: Branković 10; Asts: Vukas, Radaković 4		Pts: Jović 32; Rebs: Jović 12; Asts: Jović 7

Železnik Hall, Belgrade
Attendance: 0 (tentative)
Referees: Neutral

==== Final ranking ====
Qualified to the Final tournament

Rank	Team
1	(Serbia) Mega Soccerbet
2	(Serbia) Crvena zvezda mts
3	(Serbia) Partizan NIS
4	(Montenegro) Budućnost VOLI Podgorica
5	(Israel) Maccabi Tel Aviv
6	(Slovenia) Cedevita Olimpija
7	(Russia) Lokomotiv Kuban
8	(Romania) U-BT Cluj-Napoca

== Final tournament ==
The Final tournament was played between 3 and 6 June 2021 in Valencia, Spain.

=== Teams ===
Host team	Qualified teams	Invited teams
(Spain) Valencia Basket	(Spain) Barcelona (Spain) Real Madrid (Serbia) Mega Soccerbet	(France) LDLC ASVEL (Serbia) Crvena zvezda mts (Lithuania) Žalgiris (Italy) Stella Azzurra

Spain

=== Group A ===
Pos	Team	Pld	W	L	GF	GA	GD	Qualification
1	(Spain) Real Madrid	3	3	0	244	216	+28	Qualification to the final
2	(France) LDLC ASVEL	3	2	1	247	232	+15	
3	(Serbia) Crvena zvezda mts	3	1	2	204	229	−25	
4	(Lithuania) Žalgiris	3	0	3	210	228	−18	

Source: Adidas NGT
Rules for classification: 1) points; 2) Head-to-head; 3) Points difference; 4) Points scored.

3 June 2021
12:00 CET

Boxscore

Crvena zvezda mts (Serbia)	68–83	(France) LDLC ASVEL
Scoring by quarter: 23–20, 19–19, 10–24, 16–20
Pts: Šaranović, Branković 14; Rebs: Šaranović, Branković 5 Asts: Pavlović 5		Pts: Wibaut 15; Rebs: Malwaya 7 Asts: Doualla, Manet 3

La Fonteta, Valencia
Attendance: 0 (tentative)
Referees: Saulius Racys, Gentian Cici, Stanislav Valeev

3 June 2021
14:00 CET

Boxscore

Žalgiris (Lithuania)	65–79	(Spain) Real Madrid
Scoring by quarter: 18–22, 18–22, 10–20, 19–15
Pts: Kneižys 10; Rebs: Murauskas, Lelevičius 5 Asts: Krivas 3		Pts: Núñez 16; Rebs: Ndiaye 13; Asts: Núñez 6

La Fonteta, Valencia
Attendance: 0 (tentative)
Referees: Eduard Udyanskyy, Vasiliki Tsaroucha, Denis Hadžić

4 June 2021
09:00 CET

Boxscore

Crvena zvezda mts (Serbia)	65–63	(Lithuania) Žalgiris
Scoring by quarter: 14–11, 19–11, 17–25, 15–16
Pts: Topić 16; Rebs: Matović 7 Asts: Šaranović 7		Pts: Murauskas 13; Rebs: Krivas 9 Asts: Kublickas 6

La Fonteta, Valencia
Attendance: 0 (tentative)
Referees: Stanislav Valeev, Tomasz Trawicki, Saulius Racys

4 June 2021
11:00 CET

Boxscore

LDLC ASVEL (France)	80–82	(Spain) Real Madrid
Scoring by quarter: 18–20, 30–27, 12–16, 20–19
Pts: Parmentelot 19; Rebs: Malwaya 7 Asts: Desseignet 8		Pts: Ndiaye 30; Rebs: Ndiaye 15; Asts: Núñez 7

La Fonteta, Valencia
Attendance: 0 (tentative)
Referees: Mykola Ambrosov, Eduard Udyanskyy, Hüseyin Çelik

5 June 2021
12:00 CET

Boxscore

LDLC ASVEL (France)	84–82	(Lithuania) Žalgiris
Scoring by quarter: 23–23, 13–15, 28–17, 20–27
Pts: Kasiama 23; Rebs: Houinsou 12; Asts: Houinsou, Desseignet 7		Pts: Murauskas 27; Rebs: Murauskas 6 Asts: Kublickas 5

La Fonteta, Valencia
Attendance: 0 (tentative)
Referees: Artem Lavrukhin, Vasiliki Tsaroucha, Denis Hadžić

5 June 2021
14:15 CET

Boxscore

Real Madrid (Spain)	83–71	(Serbia) Crvena zvezda mts
Scoring by quarter: 25–12, 29–16, 14–20, 15–23
Pts: Klavžar 22; Rebs: Ndiaye 16; Asts: Klavžar 5		Pts: Branković 17; Rebs: Branković 8 Asts: Topić 7

La Fonteta, Valencia
Attendance: 0 (tentative)
Referees: Kristaps Konstantinovs, Gentian Cici, Eduard Udyanskyy

=== Group B ===
Pos	Team	Pld	W	L	GF	GA	GD	Qualification
1	(Spain) Barcelona	3	3	0	263	176	+87	Qualification to the final
2	(Serbia) Mega Soccerbet	3	2	1	271	224	+47	
3	(Italy) Stella Azzurra	3	1	2	219	245	−26	
4	(Spain) Valencia Basket	3	0	3	189	297	−108	

Source: Adidas NGT
Rules for classification: 1) points; 2) Head-to-head; 3) Points difference; 4) Points scored.

3 June 2021
16:00 CET

Boxscore

Stella Azzurra (Italy)	51–75	(Spain) Barcelona
Scoring by quarter: 15–20, 13–16, 13–20, 11–19
Pts: Pugliatti 11; Rebs: Ndzie 9 Asts: three players 2		Pts: Nnaji 15; Rebs: Bonilla 11; Asts: Bonilla 5

La Fonteta, Valencia
Attendance: 0 (tentative)
Referees: Tomasz Trawicki, Josip Radojković, Artem Lavrukhin

3 June 2021
18:00 CET

Boxscore

Valencia Basket (Spain)	75–90	(Serbia) Mega Soccerbet
Scoring by quarter: 25–22, 11–26, 20–23, 19–19
Pts: Alexandrov 23; Rebs: Navarro 8 Asts: Campillos 3		Pts: Bogavac 21; Rebs: Ivišić 13; Asts: Labović 7

La Fonteta, Valencia
Attendance: 0 (tentative)
Referees: Mykola Ambrosov, Kristaps Konstantinovs, Hüseyin Çelik

4 June 2021
13:00 CET

Boxscore

Mega Soccerbet (Serbia)	104–70	(Italy) Stella Azzurra
Scoring by quarter: 29–13, 22–26, 32–16, 21–15
Pts: Djurišić 21; Rebs: Djurišić 11; Asts: Jović 10		Pts: Jocys 31; Rebs: Ndzie 12; Asts: Fresno, Maglietti 2

La Fonteta, Valencia
Attendance: 0 (tentative)
Referees: Gentian Cici, Kristaps Konstantinovs, Artem Lavrukhin

4 June 2021
15:00 CET

Boxscore

Valencia Basket (Spain)	48–109	(Spain) Barcelona
Scoring by quarter: 13–30, 8–33, 15–22, 12–24
Pts: Campillos 10; Rebs: Sáez 10; Asts: Sáez 3		Pts: Caicedo 20; Rebs: Villar, Nnaji 8 Asts: Villar 9

La Fonteta, Valencia
Attendance: 0 (tentative)
Referees: Vasiliki Tsaroucha, Saulius Racys, Denis Hadžić

5 June 2021
16:30 CET

Boxscore

Barcelona (Spain)	79–77	(Serbia) Mega Soccerbet
Scoring by quarter: 18–18, 15–16, 19–26, 27–17
Pts: Caicedo, Nnaji 23; Rebs: Nnaji 12; Asts: Bonilla 5		Pts: Jović 20; Rebs: Jović 13; Asts: Jović 6

La Fonteta, Valencia
Attendance: 0 (tentative)
Referees: Tomasz Trawicki, Mykola Ambrosov, Hüseyin Çelik

5 June 2021
18:45 CET

Boxscore

Valencia Basket (Spain)	66–98	(Italy) Stella Azzurra
Scoring by quarter: 19–25, 18–22, 15–25, 14–26
Pts: Campillos 15; Rebs: Barbera 8 Asts: Alexandrov 5		Pts: Ndzie 18; Rebs: Ndzie 15; Asts: Pugliatti 5

La Fonteta, Valencia
Attendance: 0 (tentative)
Referees: Saulius Racys, Denis Hadžić, Stanislav Valeev

=== Final ===
6 June 2021
11:00 CET

Boxscore

Real Madrid (Spain)	81–78 (OT)	(Spain) Barcelona
Scoring by quarter: 17–17, 21–14, 22–25, 13–17, Overtime: 8–5
Pts: Kostadinov 18; Rebs: Kostadinov 12; Asts: Ndiaye 5		Pts: Caicedo 25; Rebs: Caicedo 11; Asts: Ordóñez 8

La Fonteta, Valencia
Attendance: 0 (tentative)
Referees: Saulius Racys (SWE), Mykola Ambrosov (UKR), Hüseyin Çelik (TUR)

=== Awards ===
MVP

(Spain) Eli Ndiaye (Real Madrid)

All-Tournament Team

- (France) Kymany Houinsou (LDLC ASVEL)
- (Serbia) Nikola Đurišić (Mega Soccerbet)
- (Nigeria) James Nnaji (Barcelona)
- (Spain) Michael Caicedo (Barcelona)
- (Spain) Eli Ndiaye (Real Madrid)
