= 2022–23 FC Barcelona Bàsquet season =

Spanish basketball club season

FC Barcelona
2022–23 season
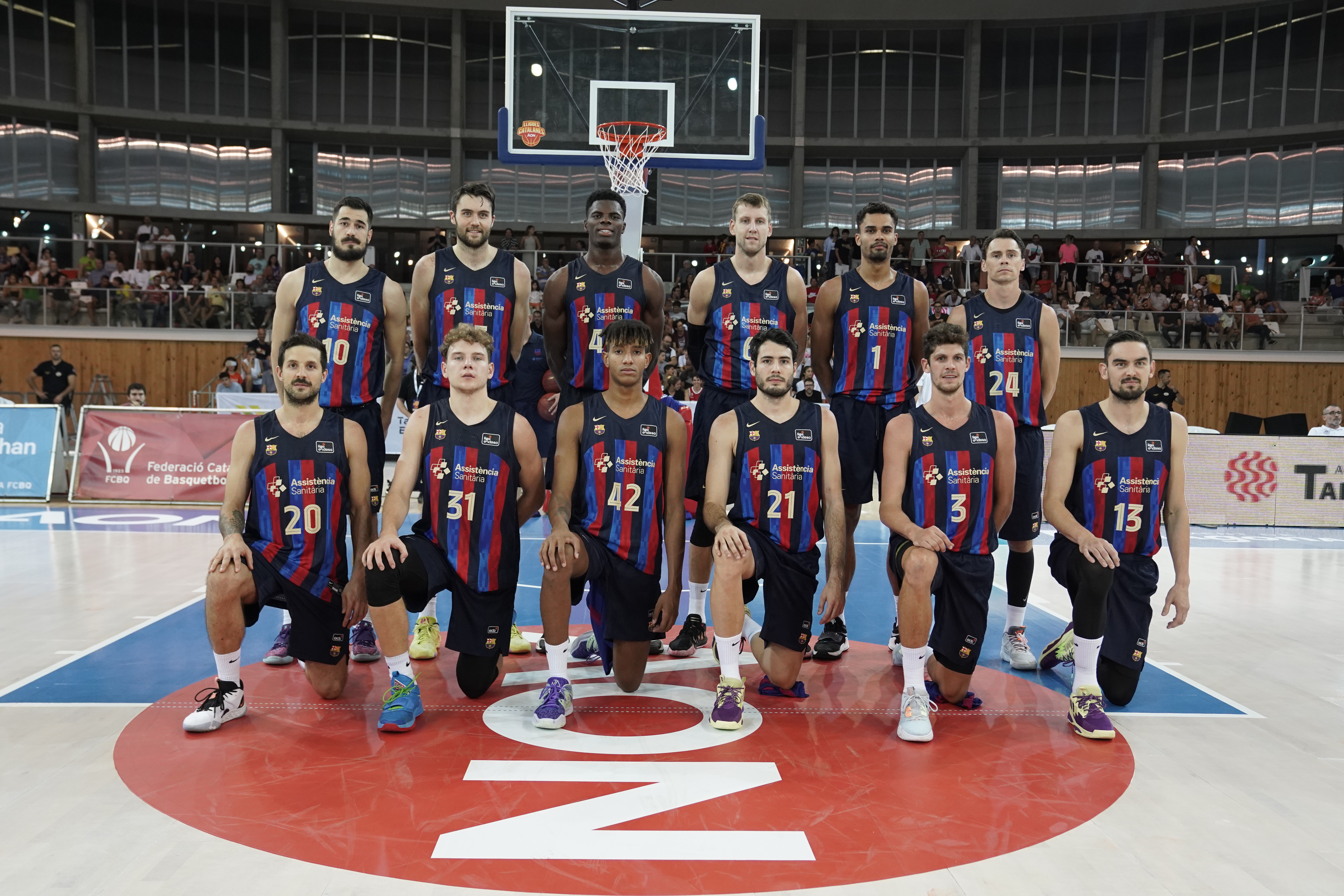
- Barcelona roster in September 2022
- President: Joan Laporta
- Head coach: Šarūnas Jasikevičius
- Arena: Palau Blaugrana
- Liga ACB: Winners
- EuroLeague: Fourth place
- Copa del Rey: Quarterfinals
- Supercopa de España: Runners-up
- Highest home attendance: 7,580 vs Real Madrid (16 April 2023)
- Average home attendance: 6,353 (in EuroLeague); 5,975 (in Liga ACB)
- Biggest win: 101–64 vs Carplus Fuenlabrada (7 May 2023)
- Biggest defeat: 66–78 vs Real Madrid (19 May 2023); 78–66 vs AS Monaco (21 May 2023)
Home	Away	Third
- All statistics correct as of 18 June 2025.

The 2022–23 season was FC Barcelona's 96th in existence, their 57th consecutive season in the top flight of Spanish basketball and 24th consecutive season in the EuroLeague.

In the 2022–23 season, FC Barcelona competed in the Liga ACB, Copa del Rey, Spanish Supercup and EuroLeague.

== Overview ==
=== Pre-season ===
Head coach Šarūnas Jasikevičius stayed at the helm for a third season after reaching the EuroLeague Final Four in both previous seasons.

The first signing of the summer was Czech center Jan Veselý, who had previously spent 8 seasons at Fenerbahçe. Veselý signed a three-season deal on July 1. Another Czech player, point guard Tomáš Satoranský, was the second signing of the summer. He had previously played two seasons for Barcelona, between 2014 and 2016. Satoranský signed a four-season deal on July 4. German forward Oscar da Silva was announced as a new Barcelona player on July 11, signing a three-season deal after playing for Alba Berlin in the previous season. The next day, Nikola Kalinić was also announced as a new player, signing a two-season deal. Mike Tobey signed on a one-season deal on July 22. Finally, Catalan small forward Oriol Paulí returned to Barcelona on August 1, after leaving the club in 2014.

In September, Barcelona played two friendly games at the Palau Blaugrana behind closed doors, beating MoraBanc Andorra in the first and losing to Partizan in the second. Between September 20 and 21, Barcelona took part in the 2022 edition of the Lliga Catalana de Bàsquet, held in Tarragona. After beating Bàsquet Girona in the semifinals, Barcelona won the final against Joventut Badalona and Nicolás Laprovíttola was named Finals MVP.

== Players ==
=== Roster ===
Note: Flags indicate national team eligibility at FIBA-sanctioned events. Players may hold other non-FIBA nationalities not displayed.

FC Barcelona roster
Players
Coaches

Pos.	No.	Nat.	Name	Ht.	Wt.	Age
F/C	1	(Brazil) (Germany)	da Silva, Oscar	2.06 m (6 ft 9 in)	105 kg (231 lb)	24 – 21 September 1998
SF	3	(Spain)	Paulí, Oriol	2.01 m (6 ft 7 in)	84 kg (185 lb)	28 – 20 May 1994
C	5	(Turkey)	Şanlı, Sertaç	2.13 m (7 ft 0 in)	115 kg (254 lb)	31 – 5 August 1991
F/C	6	(Czech Republic)	Veselý, Jan	2.13 m (7 ft 0 in)	110 kg (243 lb)	33 – 24 April 1990
SF	8	(Spain)	Martínez, Sergi	2.02 m (6 ft 8 in)	102 kg (225 lb)	23 – 10 May 1999
F	10	(Serbia)	Kalinić, Nikola	2.03 m (6 ft 8 in)	105 kg (231 lb)	31 – 8 November 1991
G	13	(Czech Republic)	Satoranský, Tomáš	2.00 m (6 ft 7 in)	95 kg (209 lb)	31 – 30 October 1991
G	20	(Argentina) (Italy)	Laprovíttola, Nicolás	1.91 m (6 ft 3 in)	82 kg (181 lb)	33 – 31 January 1990
G/F	21	(Spain)	Abrines, Álex	1.98 m (6 ft 6 in)	91 kg (201 lb)	29 – 1 August 1993
G/F	22	(United States)	Higgins, Cory	1.95 m (6 ft 5 in)	82 kg (181 lb)	33 – 14 June 1989
C	23	(United States) (Slovenia)	Tobey, Mike	2.13 m (7 ft 0 in)	115 kg (254 lb)	28 – 10 October 1994
G/F	24	(United States) (Slovakia)	Kuric, Kyle	1.93 m (6 ft 4 in)	88 kg (194 lb)	33 – 25 August 1989
PG	31	(Lithuania)	Jokubaitis, Rokas	1.93 m (6 ft 4 in)	88 kg (194 lb)	22 – 19 November 2000
PF	33	(Montenegro) (Spain)	Mirotić, Nikola (C)	2.08 m (6 ft 10 in)	113 kg (249 lb)	32 – 11 February 1991
C	46	(Nigeria)	Nnaji, James	2.12 m (6 ft 11 in)	113 kg (249 lb)	18 – 14 August 2004

Head coach

- (Lithuania) Šarūnas Jasikevičius

Assistant coach(es)

- (Lithuania) Tomas Masiulis
- (Spain) Óscar Orellana
- (Spain) David García

Team manager

- (Spain) Juan Carlos Navarro

Legend

- (C) Team captain
- Injured

- Roster

=== Depth chart ===
Pos.	Starting 5	Bench 1	Bench 2	Bench 3
C	Jan Veselý	Sertaç Şanlı †	Mike Tobey	James Nnaji ‡
PF	Nikola Mirotić †	Oscar da Silva	Sergi Martínez †
SF	Nikola Kalinić	Álex Abrines †	Oriol Paulí †
SG	Cory Higgins *	Kyle Kuric
PG	Tomáš Satoranský	Nicolás Laprovíttola	Rokas Jokubaitis

Notes: Blue † – homegrown player; (Note: A homegrown player is a player that played for at least three years before the age of 20 on a Spanish team. In Liga ACB, the team must register at least four homegrown players in rosters of 10–12 players or at least three homegrown players in rosters of 8–9 players. In EuroLeague, the team did not have any limitations regarding the number of homegrown players.) Red * – overseas player; (Note: An overseas player is a player from outside EEA, FIBA Europe or ACP states. In Liga ACB, the team may register at most two overseas players. In EuroLeague, the team did not have any limitations regarding the number of overseas players.) Green ‡ – youth player (Note: In Liga ACB, the team may register under-22 players linked to the youth system. In EuroLeague, the team may register under-20 players linked to the youth system.)

=== On loan ===
Players out on loan
Nat.	Player	Position	Team	On loan since
(Uruguay)	Agustín Ubal	G/F	(Spain) Bilbao	September 2022–June 2023
(Argentina)	Juani Marcos	PG	(Spain) Lleida	September 2022–June 2023
(Spain)	Rafa Villar	PG	(Spain) Lleida	December 2022–June 2023
(Spain)	Michael Caicedo	SG/SF	(Spain) Granada	January 2023–June 2023

=== Roster changes ===
==== In ====
No.	Pos.	Nat.	Name	Moving from		Type	Date	Source
6	F/C	(Czech Republic)	Jan Veselý	Fenerbahçe	(Turkey)	End of contract	1 Jul 2022	
13	PG	(Czech Republic)	Tomáš Satoranský	Washington Wizards	(United States)	End of contract	4 Jul 2022	
1	F/C	(Germany)	Oscar da Silva	Alba Berlin	(Germany)	Transfer	11 Jul 2022	
10	F	(Serbia)	Nikola Kalinić	Crvena zvezda	(Serbia)	Transfer	12 Jul 2022	
23	C	(Slovenia)	Mike Tobey	Valencia Basket	(Spain)	End of contract	26 Jul 2022	
3	SF	(Spain)	Oriol Paulí	MoraBanc Andorra	(Spain)	Parted ways	1 Aug 2022	

==== Out ====
No.	Pos.	Nat.	Name	Moving to		Type	Date	Source
10	F/C	(Latvia)	Rolands Šmits	Žalgiris Kaunas	(Lithuania)	End of contract	30 Jun 2022	
0	C	(Uganda)	Brandon Davies	Olimpia Milano	(Italy)	End of contract	30 Jun 2022	
14	PF	(United States)	Nigel Hayes-Davis	Fenerbahçe	(Turkey)	End of contract	30 Jun 2022	
1	G	(Australia)	Danté Exum	Partizan	(Serbia)	End of contract	30 Jun 2022	
99	PG	(Greece)	Nick Calathes	Fenerbahçe	(Turkey)	Contract termination	23 Aug 2022	
18	F/C	(Spain)	Pierre Oriola	Bàsquet Girona	(Spain)	Parted ways	30 Aug 2022	

== Pre-season and friendlies ==
=== Friendly matches ===
9 September 2022	FC Barcelona (Catalonia)	87–80	(Andorran Basketball Federation) MoraBanc Andorra	Barcelona
19:00	Scoring by quarter: 27–20, 26–12, 19–26, 15–22
	Pts: Kuric, Paulí 15	Report	Pts: Dee 16	Arena: Palau Blaugrana

13 September 2022	FC Barcelona (Catalonia)	75–81	(Basketball Federation of Serbia) Partizan	Barcelona
19:30
	Pts: Caicedo 16	Report	Pts: Lessort 19	Arena: Palau Blaugrana

=== Lliga Catalana de Bàsquet ===
20 September 2022 Semifinal	FC Barcelona (Catalonia)	88–77	(Catalonia) Bàsquet Girona	Tarragona
21:00	Scoring by quarter: 22–16, 23–21, 21–22, 22–18
	Pts: Satoranský 13	Report	Pts: Miletić 25	Arena: Palau d'Esports Catalunya; Attendance: 4000; Referees: Óscar Perea Lorente, Arnau Padrós Feliu, Andrés Fernández Carretero

21 September 2022 Final	Joventut (Catalonia)	82–92	(Catalonia) FC Barcelona	Tarragona
21:00	Scoring by quarter: 21–17, 16–24, 22–27, 23–24
	Pts: Birgander, Ellenson 16	Report	Pts: Kalinić 25	Arena: Palau d'Esports Catalunya; Attendance: 3,947; Referees: Jordi Aliaga Solé, Arnau Padrós Feliu, Andrés Fernández Carretero

== Competitions ==
=== Overview ===
Competition	First match	Last match	Starting round	Final position	Record							
Competition	First match	Last match	Starting round	Final position	Pld	W	D	L	PF	PA	PD	Win %
Liga ACB	30 September 2022	20 June 2023	Round 1	Winners	43	37		6	3,682	3,205	+477	86.05
EuroLeague	7 October 2022	21 May 2023	Round 1	Fourth place	39	26		13	3,112	2,952	+160	66.67
Copa del Rey	16 February 2023	16 February 2023	Quarter-finals	Quarter-finals	1	0		1	87	89	−2	0.00
Supercopa de España	24 September 2022	25 September 2022	Semi-finals	Runners-up	2	1		1	174	163	+11	50.00
Total					85	64	0	21	7,055	6,409	+646	75.29

Last updated: 17 June 2025
Source: Competitions

=== Liga ACB ===
==== League table ====
Pos	Team	Pld	W	L	PF	PA	PD	Qualification or relegation
1	Barça	34	29	5	2895	2489	+406	Qualification to playoffs
2	Cazoo Baskonia	34	28	6	3128	2817	+311	Qualification to playoffs
3	Real Madrid	34	28	6	3005	2629	+376	Qualification to playoffs
4	Lenovo Tenerife	34	24	10	2834	2517	+317	Qualification to playoffs
5	Unicaja	34	24	10	2969	2638	+331	Qualification to playoffs

Source: ACB
Rules for classification: 1) Win–loss record; 2) Head–to–head record; 3) Head–to–head point difference; 4) Point difference; 5) Points scored; 6) Sum of quotients of points scored (Note: Head–to–head record is used only after all the matches between the teams in question have been played)

==== Results summary ====
Overall						Home					Away				
Pld	W	L	PF	PA	PD	W	L	PF	PA	PD	W	L	PF	PA	PD
34	29	5	2895	2489	+406	17	0	1471	1192	+279	12	5	1424	1297	+127

Source: Competitive matches

==== Results by round ====
Round	1	2	3	4	5	6	7	8	9	10	11	12	13	14	15	16	17	18	19	20	21	22	23	24	25	26	27	28	29	30	31	32	33	34
Ground	A	H	A	A	H	A	H	A	H	A	A	H	H	A	H	A	H	A	H	H	A	H	A	H	A	A	H	A	H	A	H	H	A	H
Result	L	W	W	W	W	W	W	L	W	L	W	W	W	W	W	W	W	W	W	W	L	W	W	W	W	L	W	W	W	W	W	W	W	W
Position	11	6	4	3	1	1	2	3	3	4	5	4	4	3	2	2	2	2	2	2	2	2	2	2	2	3	1	1	1	1	1	1	1	1

Source: Competitive matches
A = Away; H = Home; W = Win; L = Loss; R = Rest

==== Matches ====
30 September 2022 1	Gran Canaria	88–85	FC Barcelona	Las Palmas
21:30	Scoring by quarter: 19–21, 29–19, 22–25, 18–20
	Pts: Balcerowski 17; Rebs: Brussino, Inglis 7 Asts: Albicy 11; PIR: Balcerowski 22	Boxscore	Pts: Şanlı 18; Rebs: Şanlı 10; Asts: Jokubaitis, Laprovíttola 6 PIR: Kalinić 25	Arena: Gran Canaria Arena; Attendance: 6,138; Referees: Emilio Pérez Pizarro, Alfonso Olivares, Fabio Fernández

2 October 2022 2	FC Barcelona	89–74	Cazoo Baskonia	Barcelona
20:00	Scoring by quarter: 17–23, 22–28, 26–7, 24–16
	Pts: Veselý 15; Rebs: Abrines, da Silva 6 Asts: Laprovíttola, Satoranský 5 PIR: Jokubaitis, Veselý 17	Boxscore	Pts: Thompson 13; Rebs: Costello, Marinković 6 Asts: Thompson 4 PIR: Thompson 16	Arena: Palau Blaugrana; Attendance: 5,131; Referees: Benjamín Jiménez, Rafael Serrano, Cristóbal Sánchez

9 October 2022 3	Carplus Fuenlabrada	56–84	FC Barcelona	Fuenlabrada
19:15	Scoring by quarter: 8–22, 10–12, 20–21, 18–29
	Pts: Novak 10; Rebs: Kromah, Novak 5 Asts: Novak 3 PIR: Novak 16	Boxscore	Pts: Satoranský 12; Rebs: Paulí 7 Asts: Laprovíttola, Paulí 4 PIR: Satoranský 17	Arena: Fernando Martín; Attendance: 4,510; Referees: Miguel Ángel Pérez Pérez, Jorge Martínez, Iyán González

15 October 2022 4	BAXI Manresa	78–101	FC Barcelona	Manresa
20:45	Scoring by quarter: 13–30, 16–17, 26–27, 23–27
	Pts: Bortolani 16; Rebs: Lee, Pérez 8 Asts: Pérez 6 PIR: Lee 14	Boxscore	Pts: three players 14; Rebs: Abrines, da Silva 5 Asts: Jokubaitis 8 PIR: Jokubaitis 21	Arena: Nou Congost; Attendance: 4,880; Referees: Carlos Peruga, Arnau Padrós, Joaquín García

23 October 2022 5	FC Barcelona	67–65	Lenovo Tenerife	Barcelona
12:30	Scoring by quarter: 10–12, 17–13, 21–17, 19–23
	Pts: Laprovíttola 25; Rebs: Nnaji 8 Asts: Laprovíttola, Paulí 3 PIR: Laprovíttola 23	Boxscore	Pts: Salin 22; Rebs: Abromaitis 6 Asts: Huertas 6 PIR: Salin 22	Arena: Palau Blaugrana; Attendance: 5,714; Referees: Carlos Cortés, Luis Miguel Castillo, Roberto Lucas

30 October 2022 6	Valencia Basket	80–92	FC Barcelona	Valencia
18:30	Scoring by quarter: 18–23, 22–32, 20–22, 20–15
	Pts: Jones 19; Rebs: Alexander, Dubljević 5 Asts: Harper, Jones 4 PIR: Jones 22	Boxscore	Pts: Laprovíttola 21; Rebs: Veselý 7 Asts: Jokubaitis, Satoranský 5 PIR: Kalinić 19	Arena: La Fonteta; Attendance: 7,870; Referees: Benjamín Jiménez, Rafael Serrano, Alberto Sánchez Sixto

6 November 2022 7	FC Barcelona	72–69	Bàsquet Girona	Barcelona
17:00	Scoring by quarter: 23–19, 27–19, 15–12, 7–19
	Pts: da Silva 16; Rebs: da Silva 14; Asts: Satoranský 6 PIR: da Silva, Veselý 24	Boxscore	Pts: Colom 13; Rebs: Gasol 6 Asts: Colom 4 PIR: Colom 14	Arena: Palau Blaugrana; Attendance: 6,927; Referees: Emilio Pérez Pizarro, Javier Torres, Yasmina Alcaraz

20 November 2022 8	Joventut	82–79	FC Barcelona	Badalona
18:30	Scoring by quarter: 20–26, 18–21, 24–19, 20–13
	Pts: Ribas, Tomić 16; Rebs: Tomić 7 Asts: Vives 6 PIR: Ribas 18	Boxscore	Pts: Laprovíttola 19; Rebs: Paulí 5 Asts: Jokubaitis 4 PIR: Laprovíttola 19	Arena: Palau Municipal d'Esports; Attendance: 10,132; Referees: Fernando Calatrava, Joaquín García, Fabio Fernández

27 November 2022 9	FC Barcelona	100–82	Covirán Granada	Barcelona
17:00	Scoring by quarter: 35–18, 22–24, 21–24, 22–16
	Pts: Higgins 21; Rebs: Veselý 6 Asts: Jokubaitis 6 PIR: Higgins 21	Boxscore	Pts: Bropleh 27; Rebs: Felício 8 Asts: Renfroe 5 PIR: Bropleh 25	Arena: Palau Blaugrana; Attendance: 4,980; Referees: Carlos Peruga, Francisco Araña, Iyán González

3 December 2022 10	Monbus Obradoiro	76–74	FC Barcelona	Santiago de Compostela
20:45	Scoring by quarter: 22–28, 18–15, 19–15, 17–16
	Pts: Scrubb 15; Rebs: Scrubb 7 Asts: Scrubb 5 PIR: Scrubb 19	Boxscore	Pts: Laprovíttola 15; Rebs: Mirotić 7 Asts: Laprovíttola 4 PIR: Higgins 19	Arena: Pavillón Fontes do Sar; Attendance: 5,641; Referees: Juan Carlos García González, Rafael Serrano, David Sánchez

11 December 2022 11	Río Breogán	74–78	FC Barcelona	Lugo
17:00	Scoring by quarter: 25–23, 15–20, 21–18, 13–17
	Pts: Hollatz 16; Rebs: Happ 9 Asts: Bamforth 4 PIR: Happ 12	Boxscore	Pts: Mirotić 16; Rebs: Kalinić 7 Asts: Satoranský 6 PIR: Mirotić 17	Arena: Pazo dos Deportes; Attendance: 5,146; Referees: Benjamín Jiménez, Javier Torres, Vicente Martínez

18 December 2022 12	FC Barcelona	75–60	Unicaja	Barcelona
20:00	Scoring by quarter: 18–13, 19–17, 16–20, 22–10
	Pts: Laprovíttola 13; Rebs: Tobey 8 Asts: Jokubaitis, Laprovíttola 4 PIR: Laprovíttola, Tobey 16	Boxscore	Pts: Osetkowski 11; Rebs: Barreiro, Osetkowski 5 Asts: Díaz 5 PIR: Barreiro, Osetkowski 9	Arena: Palau Blaugrana; Attendance: 4,383; Referees: Miguel Ángel Pérez Pérez, Alberto Sánchez Sixto, Raúl Zamorano

28 December 2022 13	FC Barcelona	68–63	Casademont Zaragoza	Barcelona
19:00	Scoring by quarter: 14–17, 24–19, 20–10, 10–17
	Pts: Jokubaitis, Veselý 12; Rebs: Paulí 7 Asts: Jokubaitis 8 PIR: Veselý 15	Boxscore	Pts: Jessup 21; Rebs: Hlinason 8 Asts: Sant-Roos 5 PIR: Jessup 23	Arena: Palau Blaugrana; Attendance: 6,987; Referees: Jordi Aliaga, Martín Caballero, Iyán González

2 January 2023 14	Real Madrid	78–87	FC Barcelona	Madrid
21:00	Scoring by quarter: 26–28, 18–14, 13–20, 21–25
	Pts: Tavares 19; Rebs: Tavares 11; Asts: Williams-Goss 5 PIR: Tavares 30	Boxscore	Pts: Laprovíttola 19; Rebs: da Silva 9 Asts: Laprovíttola 6 PIR: Kalinić 19	Arena: WiZink Center; Attendance: 11,187; Referees: Carlos Peruga, Carlos Cortés, Jorge Martínez

7 January 2023 15	FC Barcelona	104–70	Real Betis	Barcelona
20:45	Scoring by quarter: 29–21, 25–15, 22–16, 28–18
	Pts: Higgins, Nnaji 16; Rebs: Paulí 7 Asts: Jokubaitis 10; PIR: Nnaji 20	Boxscore	Pts: Evans 23; Rebs: Gerun 10; Asts: Evans 4 PIR: Evans 28	Arena: Palau Blaugrana; Attendance: 6,293; Referees: Fernando Calatrava, Joaquín García, Carlos Merino

15 January 2023 16	UCAM Murcia	72–86	FC Barcelona	Murcia
17:00	Scoring by quarter: 13–17, 20–20, 24–28, 15–21
	Pts: Anderson 15; Rebs: Diop, Radović 5 Asts: McFadden 7 PIR: Anderson 17	Boxscore	Pts: Laprovíttola 15; Rebs: three players 5 Asts: Higgins 5 PIR: Kuric 18	Arena: Palacio de Deportes; Attendance: 6,612; Referees: Antonio Conde, Javier Torres, Andrés Fernández

22 January 2023 17	FC Barcelona	88–78	Surne Bilbao Basket	Barcelona
12:30	Scoring by quarter: 18–11, 29–18, 16–26, 25–23
	Pts: Laprovíttola 20; Rebs: three players 4 Asts: Jokubaitis 6 PIR: Laprovíttola 31	Boxscore	Pts: Smith 16; Rebs: Withey 11; Asts: Håkanson 7 PIR: Sulejmanović, Withey 12	Arena: Palau Blaugrana; Attendance: 6,708; Referees: Juan Carlos García González, Alberto Baena, Héctor Baez

28 January 2023 18	Bàsquet Girona	73–84	FC Barcelona	Girona
20:45	Scoring by quarter: 12–22, 24–13, 17–27, 20–22
	Pts: Taylor 23; Rebs: Colom 8 Asts: Colom 6 PIR: Taylor 22	Boxscore	Pts: Laprovíttola 19; Rebs: Veselý 6 Asts: Satoranský 4 PIR: Jokubaitis, Mirotić 21	Arena: Fontajau; Attendance: 5,195; Referees: Martín Caballero, Francisco Araña, Carlos Merino

5 February 2023 19	FC Barcelona	81–75	Valencia Basket	Barcelona
12:30	Scoring by quarter: 14–24, 18–19, 25–16, 24–16
	Pts: Laprovíttola 19; Rebs: Mirotić 7 Asts: Jokubaitis 6 PIR: Jokubaitis 20	Boxscore	Pts: Rivero 18; Rebs: Webb 9 Asts: Evans 5 PIR: Rivero 22	Arena: Palau Blaugrana; Attendance: 6,606; Referees: Antonio Conde, Alfonso Olivares, Raúl Zamorano

12 February 2023 20	FC Barcelona	82–54	Río Breogán	Barcelona
12:30	Scoring by quarter: 20–12, 15–12, 23–13, 24–17
	Pts: Laprovíttola 16; Rebs: Tobey 10; Asts: Jokubaitis 6 PIR: Satoranský 16	Boxscore	Pts: Nakić 10; Rebs: Happ 6 Asts: three players 3 PIR: Nakić 18	Arena: Palau Blaugrana; Attendance: 5,187; Referees: Benjamín Jiménez, Sergio Manuel, Rubén Sánchez Mohedas

4 March 2023 21	Casademont Zaragoza	85–83	FC Barcelona	Zaragoza
20:45	Scoring by quarter: 19–12, 27–12, 23–30, 16–29
	Pts: Sant-Roos 21; Rebs: Hlinason 7 Asts: Sant-Roos 7 PIR: Sant-Roos 33	Boxscore	Pts: Laprovíttola 28; Rebs: Kalinić, Şanlı 6 Asts: Kalinić, Satoranský 4 PIR: Laprovíttola 27	Arena: Pabellón Príncipe Felipe; Attendance: 6,856; Referees: Miguel Ángel Pérez Pérez, Juan de Dios Oyón, Cristóbal Sánchez

12 March 2023 22	FC Barcelona	93–72	BAXI Manresa	Barcelona
18:30	Scoring by quarter: 32–18, 24–11, 21–20, 16–23
	Pts: Satoranský 19; Rebs: Şanlı 5 Asts: Jokubaitis, Satoranský 5 PIR: Satoranský 29	Boxscore	Pts: Waczyński 12; Rebs: three players 4 Asts: García, Pérez 3 PIR: Waczyński 15	Arena: Palau Blaugrana; Attendance: 5,822; Referees: Carlos Peruga, Vicente Bultó, Andrés Fernández

19 March 2023 23	Unicaja	81–86	FC Barcelona	Málaga
17:00	Scoring by quarter: 24–16, 15–19, 18–26, 24–25
	Pts: Perry 19; Rebs: Barreiro 7 Asts: Perry 4 PIR: Perry 25	Boxscore	Pts: Laprovíttola, Satoranský 16; Rebs: Şanlı 7 Asts: Laprovíttola 9 PIR: Laprovíttola 18	Arena: Martín Carpena; Attendance: 10,602; Referees: Benjamín Jiménez, Esperanza Mendoza, Alberto Baena

25 March 2023 24	FC Barcelona	87–71	Joventut	Barcelona
20:45	Scoring by quarter: 18–13, 21–17, 28–21, 20–20
	Pts: Satoranský 19; Rebs: Şanlı 6 Asts: Laprovíttola, Satoranský 5 PIR: Satoranský 27	Boxscore	Pts: Feliz 15; Rebs: Birgander 9 Asts: Tomić 4 PIR: Feliz 18	Arena: Palau Blaugrana; Attendance: 7,215; Referees: Jordi Aliaga, Francisco Araña, Vicente Martínez

2 April 2023 25	Lenovo Tenerife	76–79	FC Barcelona	San Cristóbal de La Laguna
13:00	Scoring by quarter: 21–24, 11–18, 24–15, 20–22
	Pts: Huertas 20; Rebs: Shermadini 6 Asts: Huertas 8 PIR: Huertas 26	Boxscore	Pts: Şanlı 18; Rebs: Mirotić, Satoranský 6 Asts: Satoranský 5 PIR: Veselý 19	Arena: Santiago Martín; Attendance: 5,152; Referees: Emilio Pérez Pizarro, Luis Miguel Castillo, Alberto Sánchez Sixto

9 April 2023 26	Surne Bilbao Basket	82–80	FC Barcelona	Bilbao
17:00	Scoring by quarter: 18–22, 13–15, 21–20, 30–23
	Pts: Smith 22; Rebs: Kyser 6 Asts: Radičević, Smith 4 PIR: Smith 23	Boxscore	Pts: Abrines 17; Rebs: Abrines 6 Asts: Laprovíttola 5 PIR: Abrines 15	Arena: Bilbao Arena; Attendance: 8,510; Referees: Fernando Calatrava, Arnau Padrós, Carlos Merino

16 April 2023 27	FC Barcelona	97–82	Real Madrid	Barcelona
18:30	Scoring by quarter: 17–24, 30–22, 31–17, 19–19
	Pts: Mirotić 23; Rebs: Kalinić 7 Asts: Satoranský 9 PIR: Satoranský 25	Boxscore	Pts: Musa 24; Rebs: Musa, Tavares 5 Asts: Musa 3 PIR: Musa 33	Arena: Palau Blaugrana; Attendance: 7,580; Referees: Carlos Peruga, Óscar Perea, Martín Caballero

19 April 2023 28	Covirán Granada	55–70	FC Barcelona	Granada
21:30	Scoring by quarter: 7–22, 16–10, 15–16, 17–22
	Pts: Costa 16; Rebs: Díaz, Niang 7 Asts: Caicedo, Renfroe 2 PIR: Niang 16	Boxscore	Pts: Mirotić 13; Rebs: Nnaji 8 Asts: Laprovíttola, Satoranský 6 PIR: Mirotić 18	Arena: Palacio de Deportes; Attendance: 6,721; Referees: Juan Carlos García González, Alberto Baena, Cristóbal Sánchez

22 April 2023 29	FC Barcelona	87–79	Gran Canaria	Barcelona
20:45	Scoring by quarter: 21–14, 28–20, 20–26, 18–19
	Pts: Laprovíttola 27; Rebs: Mirotić 7 Asts: Satoranský 6 PIR: Laprovíttola 27	Boxscore	Pts: Slaughter 13; Rebs: Balcerowski 7 Asts: Albicy 4 PIR: Balcerowski 16	Arena: Palau Blaugrana; Attendance: 6,578; Referees: Daniel Hierrezuelo, Fabio Fernández, Andrés Fernández

30 April 2023 30	Real Betis	77–85	FC Barcelona	Seville
17:00	Scoring by quarter: 10–28, 18–19, 27–18, 22–20
	Pts: Pérez, Gerun 16; Rebs: Pérez 11; Asts: Montero 5 PIR: Gerun 23	Boxscore	Pts: Abrines, Satoranský 12; Rebs: Tobey 7 Asts: Jokubaitis, Kuric 4 PIR: Satoranský 16	Arena: San Pablo; Attendance: 3,592; Referees: Antonio Conde, Raúl Zamorano, David Sánchez

7 May 2023 31	FC Barcelona	101–64	Carplus Fuenlabrada	Barcelona
17:00	Scoring by quarter: 22–16, 30–14, 24–8, 25–26
	Pts: Kuric 22; Rebs: Martínez, Şanlı 6 Asts: Satoranský 6 PIR: Kuric 21	Boxscore	Pts: Horton 16; Rebs: Lewis 5 Asts: Eyenga 3 PIR: Lewis 15	Arena: Palau Blaugrana; Attendance: 5,738; Referees: Juan Carlos García González, Jorge Martínez, Héctor Baez

12 May 2023 32	FC Barcelona	94–77	Monbus Obradoiro	Barcelona
19:00	Scoring by quarter: 15–21, 20–11, 33–18, 26–27
	Pts: Mirotić 27; Rebs: Mirotić 10; Asts: Satoranský 5 PIR: Mirotić 40	Boxscore	Pts: Robertson 19; Rebs: Guerrero 5 Asts: Westermann 4 PIR: Robertson 17	Arena: Palau Blaugrana; Attendance: 4,436; Referees: Miguel Ángel Pérez Pérez, Juan de Dios Oyón, Alberto Baena

14 May 2023 33	Cazoo Baskonia	84–91	FC Barcelona	Vitoria-Gasteiz
18:30	Scoring by quarter: 21–24, 24–21, 19–28, 20–18
	Pts: Marinković 20; Rebs: Costello 7 Asts: Thompson 8 PIR: Thompson 22	Boxscore	Pts: Abrines, Laprovíttola 18; Rebs: da Silva 6 Asts: Jokubaitis 6 PIR: Laprovíttola 22	Arena: Buesa Arena; Attendance: 15,208; Referees: Daniel Hierrezuelo, Jordi Aliaga, Sergio Manuel

24 May 2023 34	FC Barcelona	86–57	UCAM Murcia	Barcelona
20:30	Scoring by quarter: 23–15, 18–11, 21–18, 24–13
	Pts: Şanlı 15; Rebs: Veselý 6 Asts: Laprovíttola 6 PIR: Veselý 19	Boxscore	Pts: McFadden 14; Rebs: Chiozza, Pustovyi 5 Asts: Chiozza 6 PIR: Chiozza 13	Arena: Palau Blaugrana; Attendance: 3,946; Referees: Emilio Pérez Pizarro, Jorge Martínez, Carlos Merino

=== ACB Playoffs ===
==== Quarterfinals ====
29 May 2023 1	Barça	84–74	Valencia Basket	Barcelona
21:00	Scoring by quarter: 18–16, 22–21, 29–18, 15–19
	Pts: Mirotić 27; Rebs: Veselý 6 Asts: Satoranský 6 PIR: Mirotić 31	Boxscore	Pts: Harper 15; Rebs: Dubljević 7 Asts: Jones 5 PIR: Jones 16	Arena: Palau Blaugrana; Attendance: 5,454; Referees: Miguel Ángel Pérez Pérez, Rafael Serrano, Esperanza Mendoza

2 June 2023 2	Valencia Basket	64–87	Barça	Valencia
21:00	Scoring by quarter: 13–26, 13–17, 19–24, 19–20
	Pts: Harper 12; Rebs: Dubljević 8 Asts: Jones 3 PIR: Dubljević 17	Boxscore	Pts: Satoranský 14; Rebs: Tobey 8 Asts: Satoranský 7 PIR: Satoranský 20	Arena: La Fonteta; Attendance: 7,103; Referees: Juan Carlos García González, Benjamín Jiménez, Alfonso Olivares

==== Semifinals ====
7 June 2023 1	Barça	84–81	Unicaja	Barcelona
21:00	Scoring by quarter: 26–15, 19–16, 21–27, 18–23
	Pts: Mirotić 14; Rebs: three players 4 Asts: Satoranský 5 PIR: Jokubaitis 16	Boxscore	Pts: Sima 19; Rebs: Ejim 8 Asts: Carter 6 PIR: Sima 24	Arena: Palau Blaugrana; Attendance: 5,390; Referees: Fernando Calatrava, Jordi Aliaga, Francisco Araña

9 June 2023 2	Barça	79–88	Unicaja	Barcelona
21:00	Scoring by quarter: 18–25, 19–15, 20–23, 22–25
	Pts: Laprovíttola 19; Rebs: Veselý 5 Asts: Satoranský 5 PIR: Kalinić 20	Boxscore	Pts: Carter 19; Rebs: Ejim 9 Asts: Perry 5 PIR: Kravish 20	Arena: Palau Blaugrana; Attendance: 6,153; Referees: Carlos Peruga, Vicente Bultó, Rafael Serrano Sánchez Sixto

11 June 2023 3	Unicaja	79–90	Barça	Málaga
18:30	Scoring by quarter: 17–20, 26–20, 17–26, 19–24
	Pts: Kravish 13; Rebs: Sima 6 Asts: Díaz 4 PIR: Kravish 14	Boxscore	Pts: four players 12; Rebs: Mirotić 5 Asts: Jokubaitis 5 PIR: Mirotić 17	Arena: Martín Carpena; Attendance: 10,602; Referees: Antonio Conde, Martín Caballero, Javier Torres

13 June 2023 4	Unicaja	75–87	Barça	Málaga
21:00	Scoring by quarter: 13–23, 24–22, 15–28, 23–14
	Pts: Kravish 10; Rebs: Ejim 5 Asts: Brizuela 3 PIR: Kravish 10	Boxscore	Pts: Mirotić 13; Rebs: Veselý 7 Asts: Jokubaitis 6 PIR: Mirotić 14	Arena: Martín Carpena; Attendance: 10,602; Referees: Juan Carlos García González, Carlos Cortés, Sergio Manuel

==== Finals ====
16 June 2023 1	Barça	97–88	Real Madrid	Barcelona
21:00	Scoring by quarter: 28–23, 19–27, 16–11, 34–27
	Pts: Laprovíttola 19; Rebs: Mirotić 7 Asts: Jokubaitis 7 PIR: Laprovíttola 23	Boxscore	Pts: Rodríguez 16; Rebs: Tavares 7 Asts: Rodríguez 3 PIR: Tavares 22	Arena: Palau Blaugrana; Attendance: 6,819; Referees: Daniel Hierrezuelo, Óscar Perea, Martín Caballero

18 June 2023 2	Barça	86–85	Real Madrid	Barcelona
21:00	Scoring by quarter: 20–19, 25–22, 23–24, 18–20
	Pts: Mirotić 20; Rebs: Satoranský 5 Asts: Laprovíttola 4 PIR: Mirotić 26	Boxscore	Pts: Hezonja 18; Rebs: Tavares 6 Asts: Musa 3 PIR: Hezonja 22	Arena: Palau Blaugrana; Attendance: 7,406; Referees: Antonio Conde, Emilio Pérez Pizarro, Fernando Calatrava

20 June 2023 3	Real Madrid	82–93	Barça	Madrid
21:00	Scoring by quarter: 21–20, 20–18, 25–29, 16–26
	Pts: Tavares 19; Rebs: Tavares 11; Asts: Rodríguez 6 PIR: Tavares 28	Boxscore	Pts: Veselý 19; Rebs: Mirotić 6 Asts: Laprovíttola 5 PIR: Mirotić 18	Arena: WiZink Center; Attendance: 11,965; Referees: Carlos Peruga, Benjamín Jiménez, Javier Torres

=== EuroLeague ===
==== League table ====
Pos	Team	Pld	W	L	PF	PA	PD	Qualification
1	(Hellenic Basketball Federation) Olympiacos	34	24	10	2857	2578	+279	Qualification to playoffs
2	(Spanish Basketball Federation) Barcelona	34	23	11	2723	2580	+143	Qualification to playoffs
3	(Spanish Basketball Federation) Real Madrid	34	23	11	2877	2666	+211	Qualification to playoffs
4	(French Federation of Basketball) AS Monaco	34	21	13	2802	2749	+53	Qualification to playoffs
5	(Israeli Basketball Association) Maccabi Playtika Tel Aviv	34	20	14	2827	2743	+84	Qualification to playoffs

Source: EuroLeague
Rules for classification: All points scored in extra period(s) were not counted in the standings, nor for any tie-break situation.

==== Results summary ====
Overall						Home					Away				
Pld	W	L	PF	PA	PD	W	L	PF	PA	PD	W	L	PF	PA	PD
34	23	11	2723	2580	+143	13	4	1343	1245	+98	10	7	1380	1335	+45

Last updated: 10 April 2025.
Source: Competitive matches

==== Results by round ====
Round	1	2	3	4	5	6	7	8	9	10	11	12	13	14	15	16	17	18	19	20	21	22	23	24	25	26	27	28	29	30	31	32	33	34
Ground	H	H	A	A	H	H	A	A	H	H	A	H	A	H	A	A	H	A	H	A	A	H	H	A	H	H	A	A	H	A	A	H	A	H
Result	L	W	W	L	W	W	W	L	W	W	W	L	W	W	L	W	L	W	L	W	L	W	W	W	W	W	L	L	W	W	W	W	L	W
Position	14	11	7	10	6	5	3	5	4	4	3	5	4	2	4	2	4	2	4	4	4	3	3	3	3	3	3	3	3	3	3	2	3	2

Source: Competitive matches
A = Away; H = Home; W = Win; L = Loss; P = Postponed

==== Matches ====
7 October 2022 1	Barcelona (Spanish Basketball Federation)	70–80	(Hellenic Basketball Federation) Olympiacos	Barcelona
20:30	Scoring by quarter: 16–13, 12–21, 21–23, 21–23
	Pts: Laprovíttola 16; Rebs: Veselý 6 Asts: Satoranský 4 PIR: Higgins 13	Boxscore	Pts: Vezenkov 20; Rebs: Vezenkov, Bolomboy 7 Asts: Sloukas 9 PIR: Bolomboy 20	Arena: Palau Blaugrana; Attendance: 5,730; Referees: Sreten Radović, Damir Javor, Mehdi Difallah

13 October 2022 2	Barcelona (Spanish Basketball Federation)	75–73	(Spanish Basketball Federation) Real Madrid	Barcelona
20:30	Scoring by quarter: 24–15, 16–15, 23–22, 12–21
	Pts: Şanlı 14; Rebs: Satoranský 7 Asts: Laprovíttola 6 PIR: Satoranský 22	Boxscore	Pts: Deck 21; Rebs: Yabusele 7 Asts: Llull, Rodríguez 4 PIR: Deck 23	Arena: Palau Blaugrana; Attendance: 7,511; Referees: Borys Ryzhyk, Oļegs Latiševs, Milan Nedović

18 October 2022 3	Bayern Munich (German Basketball Federation)	73–84	(Spanish Basketball Federation) Barcelona	Munich
20:30	Scoring by quarter: 18–18, 16–19, 19–28, 20–19
	Pts: Rubit 19; Rebs: Rubit 7 Asts: Rubit 3 PIR: Rubit 25	Boxscore	Pts: three players 14; Rebs: Kalinić 8 Asts: Satoranský 7 PIR: Veselý 21	Arena: Audi Dome; Attendance: 5,212; Referees: Saša Pukl, Piotr Pastusiak, Elias Koromilas

20 October 2022 4	Žalgiris (Lithuanian Basketball Federation)	73–72	(Spanish Basketball Federation) Barcelona	Kaunas
19:00	Scoring by quarter: 20–19, 24–16, 11–21, 18–16
	Pts: Evans 18; Rebs: Ulanovas 7 Asts: Evans 4 PIR: Ulanovas 22	Boxscore	Pts: Veselý 12; Rebs: Higgins, Kalinić 5 Asts: Jokubaitis 6 PIR: Higgins 19	Arena: Žalgirio Arena; Attendance: 15,170; Referees: Milivoje Jovčić, Emin Moğulkoç, Michele Rossi

28 October 2022 5	Barcelona (Spanish Basketball Federation)	74–56	(Italian Basketball Federation) EA7 Emporio Armani Milan	Barcelona
20:30	Scoring by quarter: 21–21, 22–8, 18–12, 13–15
	Pts: Tobey 13; Rebs: Tobey 7 Asts: Laprovíttola 5 PIR: Satoranský 18	Boxscore	Pts: Davies 18; Rebs: Davies, Melli 6 Asts: Pangos 5 PIR: Davies 18	Arena: Palau Blaugrana; Attendance: 6,316; Referees: Ilija Belošević, Damir Javor, Joseph Bissang

4 November 2022 6	Barcelona (Spanish Basketball Federation)	81–80	(Turkish Basketball Federation) Fenerbahçe Beko	Barcelona
20:30	Scoring by quarter: 21–19, 18–17, 23–13, 19–31
	Pts: Laprovíttola 26; Rebs: Tobey 7 Asts: Laprovíttola 7 PIR: Laprovíttola 28	Boxscore	Pts: Motley 23; Rebs: Motley 7 Asts: Wilbekin 4 PIR: Motley 26	Arena: Palau Blaugrana; Attendance: 6,777; Referees: Matej Boltauzer, Tomislav Hordov, Uroš Nikolić

10 November 2022 7	Maccabi Playtika Tel Aviv (Israeli Basketball Association)	79–86	(Spanish Basketball Federation) Barcelona	Tel Aviv
20:05	Scoring by quarter: 20–23, 23–17, 18–22, 18–24
	Pts: Brown 18; Rebs: Poythress 6 Asts: Brown 5 PIR: Brown 17	Boxscore	Pts: Laprovíttola 19; Rebs: three players 6 Asts: Satoranský 6 PIR: Satoranský 18	Arena: Menora Mivtachim Arena; Attendance: 10,478; Referees: Borys Ryzhyk, Fernando Rocha, Anne Panther

17 November 2022 8	Anadolu Efes (Turkish Basketball Federation)	96–86	(Spanish Basketball Federation) Barcelona	Istanbul
18:30	Scoring by quarter: 16–22, 29–19, 21–16, 30–29
	Pts: Clyburn 24; Rebs: Clyburn 6 Asts: Micić 5 PIR: Micić 36	Boxscore	Pts: Laprovíttola 28; Rebs: Şanlı 6 Asts: Satoranský 4 PIR: Laprovíttola 27	Arena: Sinan Erdem Dome; Attendance: 15,290; Referees: Robert Lottermoser, Carmelo Paternicò, Luka Kardum

22 November 2022 9	Barcelona (Spanish Basketball Federation)	79–68	(Basketball Federation of Serbia) Partizan Mozzart Bet	Barcelona
20:45	Scoring by quarter: 17–21, 22–11, 25–17, 15–19
	Pts: Laprovíttola 13; Rebs: da Silva 10; Asts: Laprovíttola 6 PIR: Laprovíttola 14	Boxscore	Pts: Anđušić 23; Rebs: Brodziansky, Lessort 5 Asts: Anđušić, Madar 2 PIR: Anđušić 28	Arena: Palau Blaugrana; Attendance: 5,066; Referees: Oļegs Latiševs, Mehdi Difallah, Sérgio Silva

25 November 2022 10	Barcelona (Spanish Basketball Federation)	96–84	(Spanish Basketball Federation) Cazoo Baskonia	Barcelona
20:30	Scoring by quarter: 22–22, 30–26, 24–25, 20–11
	Pts: Veselý 18; Rebs: Satoranský 6 Asts: Laprovíttola 6 PIR: Veselý 25	Boxscore	Pts: Howard 25; Rebs: Enoch 5 Asts: Henry 6 PIR: Howard 25	Arena: Palau Blaugrana; Attendance: 5,599; Referees: Matej Boltauzer, Milivoje Jovčić, Joseph Bissang

1 December 2022 11	ALBA Berlin (German Basketball Federation)	86–88	(Spanish Basketball Federation) Barcelona	Berlin
18:30	Scoring by quarter: 19–30, 27–15, 11–26, 29–17
	Pts: Blatt 17; Rebs: Thiemann 7 Asts: Blatt 6 PIR: Thiemann 22	Boxscore	Pts: Mirotić 19; Rebs: Mirotić, Satoranský 6 Asts: Laprovíttola 6 PIR: Mirotić 29	Arena: Mercedes-Benz Arena; Attendance: 8,916; Referees: Damir Javor, Robert Vyklický, Uroš Obrknežević

9 December 2022 12	Barcelona (Spanish Basketball Federation)	74–75	(French Federation of Basketball) LDLC ASVEL	Barcelona
20:30	Scoring by quarter: 15–21, 31–19, 16–17, 12–18
	Pts: Mirotić 17; Rebs: Satoranský, Mirotić 5 Asts: Şanlı 4 PIR: Mirotić 21	Boxscore	Pts: de Colo 19; Rebs: Fall 18; Asts: de Colo 3 PIR: Fall 24	Arena: Palau Blaugrana; Attendance: 5,737; Referees: Saša Pukl, Luka Kardum, Michele Rossi

14 December 2022 13	AS Monaco (French Federation of Basketball)	63–69	(Spanish Basketball Federation) Barcelona	Fontvieille
19:00	Scoring by quarter: 13–16, 16–18, 16–26, 18–9
	Pts: James 16; Rebs: Diallo, Blossomgame 6 Asts: James 4 PIR: James 13	Boxscore	Pts: Mirotić 15; Rebs: Mirotić 9 Asts: Laprovíttola 8 PIR: Mirotić 22	Arena: Salle Gaston Médecin; Attendance: 4,009; Referees: Borys Ryzhyk, Sreten Radović, Gytis Vilius

16 December 2022 14	Barcelona (Spanish Basketball Federation)	74–68	(Hellenic Basketball Federation) Panathinaikos	Barcelona
20:30	Scoring by quarter: 28–12, 15–18, 19–21, 12–17
	Pts: Veselý 15; Rebs: Kalinić, Higgins 5 Asts: Satoranský, Laprovíttola 6 PIR: Veselý 22	Boxscore	Pts: Bacon 19; Rebs: Ponitka, Papagiannis 9 Asts: Lee 4 PIR: Ponitka 20	Arena: Palau Blaugrana; Attendance: 6,072; Referees: Matej Boltauzer, Oļegs Latiševs, Joseph Bissang

23 December 2022 15	Valencia Basket (Spanish Basketball Federation)	84–83	(Spanish Basketball Federation) Barcelona	Valencia
20:30	Scoring by quarter: 20–20, 21–18, 21–21, 22–24
	Pts: Rivero 16; Rebs: Dubljević 6 Asts: Jones 7 PIR: Rivero 18	Boxscore	Pts: Laprovíttola 28; Rebs: Kalinić 8 Asts: Laprovíttola 7 PIR: Laprovíttola 31	Arena: La Fonteta; Attendance: 7,906; Referees: Mehdi Difallah, Fernando Rocha, Seffi Shemmesh

30 December 2022 16	Crvena zvezda mts (Basketball Federation of Serbia)	94–99(OT)	(Spanish Basketball Federation) Barcelona	Belgrade
19:00	Scoring by quarter: 17–28, 23–15, 25–14, 19–27, Overtime: 10–15
	Pts: Petrušev, Nedović 24; Rebs: Petrušev 9 Asts: Nedović 7 PIR: Nedović 30	Boxscore	Pts: Satoranský 19; Rebs: Veselý 5 Asts: Satoranský 10; PIR: Satoranský 28	Arena: Aleksandar Nikolić Hall; Attendance: 7,500; Referees: Robert Lottermoser, Emin Moğulkoç, Aare Halliko

5 January 2023 17	Barcelona (Spanish Basketball Federation)	75–83	(Italian Basketball Federation) Virtus Segafredo Bologna	Barcelona
20:30	Scoring by quarter: 15–26, 24–16, 18–18, 18–23
	Pts: Veselý 12; Rebs: da Silva 6 Asts: Laprovíttola 10; PIR: da Silva 18	Boxscore	Pts: Lundberg 20; Rebs: Weems 6 Asts: Teodosić, Shengelia 6 PIR: Lundberg 23	Arena: Palau Blaugrana; Attendance: 5,832; Referees: Sreten Radović, Sašo Petek, Eduard Udyanskyy

11 January 2023 18	LDLC ASVEL (French Federation of Basketball)	75–82	(Spanish Basketball Federation) Barcelona	Villeurbanne
20:00	Scoring by quarter: 15–11, 18–31, 27–21, 15–19
	Pts: Fall 23; Rebs: Jackson-Cartwright, Fall 6 Asts: Jackson-Cartwright, Mathews 4 PIR: Fall 31	Boxscore	Pts: Mirotić 19; Rebs: Jokubaitis 5 Asts: Jokubaitis, Higgins 4 PIR: Mirotić 25	Arena: Astroballe; Attendance: 5,560; Referees: Damir Javor, Michele Rossi, Gentian Cici

13 January 2023 19	Barcelona (Spanish Basketball Federation)	75–80	(Turkish Basketball Federation) Anadolu Efes	Barcelona
20:30	Scoring by quarter: 9–21, 19–18, 20–23, 27–18
	Pts: Higgins 17; Rebs: Veselý, Mirotić 6 Asts: Laprovíttola 5 PIR: Higgins 26	Boxscore	Pts: Micić, Larkin 17; Rebs: Micić, Clyburn 6 Asts: Micić 6 PIR: Micić 27	Arena: Palau Blaugrana; Attendance: 7,437; Referees: Borys Ryzhyk, Oļegs Latiševs, Milan Nedović

19 January 2023 20	Cazoo Baskonia (Spanish Basketball Federation)	78–85	(Spanish Basketball Federation) Barcelona	Vitoria-Gasteiz
20:30	Scoring by quarter: 28–28, 12–19, 23–17, 15–21
	Pts: Sedekerskis 16; Rebs: Sedekerskis 6 Asts: Thompson 5 PIR: Sedekerskis 23	Boxscore	Pts: Mirotić 15; Rebs: Kalinić 7 Asts: Kalinić, Satoranský 4 PIR: Mirotić 18	Arena: Buesa Arena; Attendance: 10,072; Referees: Saša Pukl, Robert Lottermoser, Jurgis Laurinavičius

26 January 2023 21	Real Madrid (Spanish Basketball Federation)	91–86(OT)	(Spanish Basketball Federation) Barcelona	Madrid
19:00	Scoring by quarter: 16–20, 16–19, 18–20, 23–14, Overtime: 18–13
	Pts: Deck 23; Rebs: Tavares, Deck 7 Asts: Rodríguez 4 PIR: Deck 33	Boxscore	Pts: Mirotić 17; Rebs: Kalinić 7 Asts: Satoranský 7 PIR: Satoranský 17	Arena: WiZink Center; Attendance: 10,305; Referees: Sreten Radović, Joseph Bissang, Tomislav Hordov

31 January 2023 22	Barcelona (Spanish Basketball Federation)	83–78	(Israeli Basketball Association) Maccabi Playtika Tel Aviv	Barcelona
20:30	Scoring by quarter: 20–15, 21–22, 21–30, 21–11
	Pts: Higgins 15; Rebs: Mirotić 9 Asts: Satoranský 5 PIR: Higgins 20	Boxscore	Pts: Adams 20; Rebs: Martin 6 Asts: Baldwin 6 PIR: Adams 20	Arena: Palau Blaugrana; Attendance: 6,843; Referees: Milivoje Jovčić, Anne Panther, Mehdi Difallah

2 February 2023 23	Barcelona (Spanish Basketball Federation)	72–70	(German Basketball Federation) Bayern Munich	Barcelona
20:30	Scoring by quarter: 21–14, 13–19, 17–14, 21–23
	Pts: Mirotić 12; Rebs: Veselý 9 Asts: Satoranský 5 PIR: Jokubaitis, Veselý 16	Boxscore	Pts: Weiler-Babb 15; Rebs: Rubit, Wimberg 5 Asts: Walden 3 PIR: Weiler-Babb 16	Arena: Palau Blaugrana; Attendance: 5,668; Referees: Ilija Belošević, Emin Moğulkoç, Mario Majkić

9 February 2023 24	Virtus Segafredo Bologna (Italian Basketball Federation)	75–92	(Spanish Basketball Federation) Barcelona	Bologna
20:30	Scoring by quarter: 17–22, 10–25, 12–27, 36–18
	Pts: Jaiteh 14; Rebs: Jaiteh 5 Asts: Mannion 6 PIR: Lundberg 18	Boxscore	Pts: Mirotić 17; Rebs: Kalinić, Veselý 5 Asts: Satoranský 6 PIR: Mirotić 21	Arena: Segafredo Arena; Attendance: 9,028; Referees: Robert Lottermoser, Milan Nedović, Adar Peer

24 February 2023 25	Barcelona (Spanish Basketball Federation)	80–70	(French Federation of Basketball) AS Monaco	Barcelona
20:45	Scoring by quarter: 24–18, 26–21, 15–18, 15–13
	Pts: Satoranský 15; Rebs: Veselý 7 Asts: Laprovíttola, Veselý 3 PIR: Veselý 20	Boxscore	Pts: James 14; Rebs: Diallo 5 Asts: James, Loyd 3 PIR: James, Diallo 15	Arena: Palau Blaugrana; Attendance: 6,840; Referees: Matej Boltauzer, Tomislav Hordov, Piotr Pastusiak

2 March 2023 26	Barcelona (Spanish Basketball Federation)	93–74	(Lithuanian Basketball Federation) Žalgiris	Barcelona
19:00	Scoring by quarter: 19–17, 27–19, 31–18, 16–20
	Pts: Mirotić 28; Rebs: Kalinić 5 Asts: three players 5 PIR: Mirotić 27	Boxscore	Pts: Brazdeikis 15; Rebs: three players 4 Asts: Butkevičius 4 PIR: Birutis 17	Arena: Palau Blaugrana; Attendance: 5,545; Referees: Damir Javor, Anne Panther, Luka Kardum

7 March 2023 27	Olympiacos (Hellenic Basketball Federation)	77–70	(Spanish Basketball Federation) Barcelona	Piraeus
20:00	Scoring by quarter: 11–20, 18–7, 21–18, 27–25
	Pts: McKissic 16; Rebs: Fall, Vezenkov 7 Asts: McKissic 4 PIR: McKissic 16	Boxscore	Pts: Mirotić 19; Rebs: Mirotić 7 Asts: Laprovíttola 8 PIR: Mirotić 21	Arena: Peace and Friendship Stadium; Attendance: 11,425; Referees: Ilija Belošević, Mehdi Difallah, Sašo Petek

10 March 2023 28	Fenerbahçe Beko (Turkish Basketball Federation)	81–73	(Spanish Basketball Federation) Barcelona	Istanbul
18:45	Scoring by quarter: 18–30, 19–10, 24–16, 20–17
	Pts: Motley 16; Rebs: four players 4 Asts: Calathes, Wilbekin 4 PIR: Hayes, Motley 17	Boxscore	Pts: Mirotić 19; Rebs: Veselý 9 Asts: Satoranský 4 PIR: Mirotić 17	Arena: Ülker Sports and Event Hall; Attendance: 12,106; Referees: Saša Pukl, Fernando Rocha, Uroš Nikolić

17 March 2023 29	Barcelona (Spanish Basketball Federation)	85–79	(Basketball Federation of Serbia) Crvena zvezda Meridianbet	Barcelona
20:30	Scoring by quarter: 18–15, 22–21, 17–21, 28–22
	Pts: Mirotić, Veselý 21; Rebs: Veselý 6 Asts: Jokubaitis 8 PIR: Mirotić 24	Boxscore	Pts: Campazzo 24; Rebs: Bentil 7 Asts: Campazzo 4 PIR: Campazzo 24	Arena: Palau Blaugrana; Attendance: 7,160; Referees: Sreten Radović, Carmelo Paternicò, Amit Balak

23 March 2023 30	Panathinaikos (Hellenic Basketball Federation)	74–88	(Spanish Basketball Federation) Barcelona	Marousi
19:30	Scoring by quarter: 25–22, 11–21, 24–25, 14–20
	Pts: Papagiannis 19; Rebs: Papagiannis 7 Asts: Lee 4 PIR: Papagiannis 23	Boxscore	Pts: Mirotić 26; Rebs: Kalinić, Satoranský 9 Asts: Satoranský 9 PIR: Mirotić, Satoranský 26	Arena: OAKA Altion; Attendance: 4,830; Referees: Oļegs Latiševs, Milan Nedović, Luka Kardum

28 March 2023 31	Partizan Mozzart Bet (Basketball Federation of Serbia)	80–89	(Spanish Basketball Federation) Barcelona	Belgrade
20:30	Scoring by quarter: 21–25, 24–19, 13–22, 22–23
	Pts: Exum 24; Rebs: Lessort 6 Asts: Punter 2 PIR: Exum 25	Boxscore	Pts: Laprovíttola 25; Rebs: Mirotić 8 Asts: Laprovíttola 7 PIR: Laprovíttola 32	Arena: Štark Arena; Attendance: 20,041; Referees: Borys Ryzhyk, Anne Panther, Seffi Shemmesh

30 March 2023 32	Barcelona (Spanish Basketball Federation)	72–56	(German Basketball Federation) ALBA Berlin	Barcelona
20:30	Scoring by quarter: 19–21, 15–14, 16–7, 22–14
	Pts: Şanlı 12; Rebs: Mirotić, Şanlı 6 Asts: Jokubaitis 5 PIR: Şanlı 20	Boxscore	Pts: Wetzell 9 Rebs: Sikma 7 Asts: Sikma 4 PIR: Olinde 12	Arena: Palau Blaugrana; Attendance: 6,309; Referees: Sreten Radović, Joseph Bissang, Vassiliki Tsaroucha

7 April 2023 33	EA7 Emporio Armani Milan (Italian Basketball Federation)	84–76	(Spanish Basketball Federation) Barcelona	Assago
20:30	Scoring by quarter: 18–21, 21–15, 19–12, 26–28
	Pts: Napier 18; Rebs: Melli 6 Asts: Shields, Pangos 5 PIR: Melli 18	Boxscore	Pts: Kuric 17; Rebs: Şanlı 6 Asts: three players 3 PIR: Kuric 15	Arena: Mediolanum Forum; Attendance: 11,294; Referees: Ilija Belošević, Matej Boltauzer, Gytis Vilius

14 April 2023 34	Barcelona (Spanish Basketball Federation)	85–71	(Spanish Basketball Federation) Valencia Basket	Barcelona
20:30	Scoring by quarter: 24–21, 27–25, 21–15, 13–10
	Pts: Mirotić 18; Rebs: Şanlı 8 Asts: Abrines 6 PIR: Abrines 23	Boxscore	Pts: Harper 14; Rebs: Alexander 6 Asts: three players 4 PIR: Claver 12	Arena: Palau Blaugrana; Attendance: 6,500; Referees: Saša Pukl, Uroš Nikolić, Luka Kardum

=== EuroLeague Playoffs ===
==== Playoff series ====
26 April 2023 Game 1	Barcelona (Spanish Basketball Federation)	91–69	(Lithuanian Basketball Federation) Žalgiris	Barcelona
20:00 (CEST)	Scoring by quarter: 25–13, 23–18, 18–22, 25–16
	Pts: Şanlı 17; Rebs: Tobey, Satoranský 7 Asts: Satoranský 5 PIR: Şanlı 20	Boxscore	Pts: Brazdeikis 14; Rebs: three players 4 Asts: six players 1 PIR: Polonara 12	Arena: Palau Blaugrana; Attendance: 6,731; Referees: Ilija Belošević, Milan Nedović, Luka Kardum

28 April 2023 Game 2	Barcelona (Spanish Basketball Federation)	89–81	(Lithuanian Basketball Federation) Žalgiris	Barcelona
20:00 (CEST)	Scoring by quarter: 20–21, 25–23, 23–22, 21–15
	Pts: Veselý 26; Rebs: Veselý 6 Asts: Laprovíttola 11; PIR: Veselý 33	Boxscore	Pts: Brazdeikis 20; Rebs: Polonara, Šmits 4 Asts: six players 2 PIR: Brazdeikis 16	Arena: Palau Blaugrana; Attendance: 7,041; Referees: Saša Pukl, Anne Panther, Tomislav Hordov

3 May 2023 Game 3	Žalgiris (Lithuanian Basketball Federation)	66–77	(Spanish Basketball Federation) Barcelona	Kaunas
19:00 (CEST)	Scoring by quarter: 10–13, 16–16, 22–32, 18–16
	Pts: Ulanovas 13; Rebs: Ulanovas 9 Asts: Polonara 3 PIR: Ulanovas 14	Boxscore	Pts: Satoranský, Veselý 14; Rebs: Jokubaitis 4 Asts: Satoranský 5 PIR: Veselý 20	Arena: Žalgirio Arena; Attendance: 15,293; Referees: Damir Javor, Tomislav Hordov, Uroš Nikolić

=== EuroLeague Final Four ===
19 May 2023 Semifinal	Barcelona (Spain)	66–78	(Spain) Real Madrid	Kaunas
20:00	Scoring by quarter: 18–18, 24–18, 13–22, 11–20
	Pts: Abrines 16; Rebs: Satoranský 11; Asts: three players 3 PIR: Abrines 14	Boxscore	Pts: Tavares 20; Rebs: Tavares 15; Asts: Rodríguez, Llull 5 PIR: Tavares 39	Arena: Žalgirio Arena; Attendance: 11,411; Referees: Saša Pukl, Emin Moğulkoç, Mehdi Difallah

21 May 2023 Third place	AS Monaco (French Federation of Basketball)	78–66	(Spanish Basketball Federation) Barcelona	Kaunas
16:00	Scoring by quarter: 24–13, 20–15, 16–17, 18–21
	Pts: Strazel 14; Rebs: Hall 11; Asts: Loyd 6 PIR: Hall 17	Boxscore	Pts: Mirotić 15; Rebs: Nnaji, Veselý 4 Asts: three players 4 PIR: Mirotić 14	Arena: Žalgirio Arena; Attendance: 9,333; Referees: Borys Ryzhyk, Anne Panther, Tomislav Hordov

=== Copa del Rey ===
==== Quarterfinals ====
16 February 2023	Barça	87–89(OT)	Unicaja	Badalona
21:30	Scoring by quarter: 21–20, 20–14, 14–16, 21–26, Overtime: 11–13
	Pts: Mirotić 15; Rebs: Mirotić 9 Asts: Veselý 5 PIR: Satoranský, Mirotić 14	Boxscore	Pts: Brizuela 27; Rebs: Perry 6 Asts: Thomas 6 PIR: Perry 27	Arena: Palau Municipal d'Esports; Attendance: 10,147; Referees: Carlos Peruga, Fernando Calatrava, Jorge Martínez

=== Supercopa de España ===
==== Semifinals ====
24 September 2022	Barça	91–74	Joventut	Seville
21:30	Scoring by quarter: 18–22, 21–24, 29–14, 23–14
	Pts: Laprovíttola 26; Rebs: Şanlı 8 Asts: Veselý, Laprovíttola 4 PIR: Laprovíttola 29	Boxscore	Pts: Parra, Ellenson 14; Rebs: Tomić 7 Asts: Vives 5 PIR: Parra 23	Arena: San Pablo; Attendance: 5,797; Referees: Daniel Hierrezuelo, Jordi Aliaga, Martín Caballero

==== Final ====
25 September 2022	Real Madrid	89–83(OT)	Barça	Seville
18:30	Scoring by quarter: 17–15, 12–22, 26–12, 16–22, Overtime: 18–12
	Pts: Tavares 24; Rebs: Tavares 12; Asts: three players 3 PIR: Tavares 40	Boxscore	Pts: Şanlı 21; Rebs: Kalinić 7 Asts: Laprovíttola 14; PIR: Laprovíttola 18	Arena: San Pablo; Attendance: 5,855; Referees: Daniel Hierrezuelo, Antonio Conde, Jordi Aliaga

== Individual awards ==
=== Liga ACB ===
Finals MVP

- (Spain) Nikola Mirotić

All-Liga ACB Second Team

- (Argentina) Nicolás Laprovíttola
- (Spain) Nikola Mirotić

Player of the Round

- (Czech Republic) Tomáš Satoranský – Round 22

=== EuroLeague ===
All-EuroLeague Second Team

- (Spain) Nikola Mirotić
