= Grasu =

Grasu may refer to:

- Grasu River, a river in Romania
- Costel Grasu (born 1967), Romanian discus thrower
- Hroniss Grasu (born 1991), American football player
- Nicoleta Grasu (born 1971), Romanian discus thrower
- Ștefan Grasu (born 2003), Romanian basketball player, son of Costel and Nicoleta
