= Rafael Santos =

Rafael Santos is a Portuguese name, may refer to:

- Rafael Santos Torroella (1914–2002), Spanish art critic and poet
- Rafael Santos (athlete) (born 1944), Salvadoran Olympic sprinter
- Rafael Santos (footballer, born 1942), Argentine football forward
- Rafael Santos (footballer, born 1984), Brazilian football centre-back
- Rafael Santos (footballer, born 1989), Brazilian football goalkeeper
- Rafael Santos (footballer, born 1995), Brazilian football midfielder
- Rafael Santos (footballer, born 1997), Portuguese football midfielder
- Rafael Santos (footballer, born 2 February 1998), Brazilian footballer
- Rafael Santos (footballer, born 5 February 1998), Brazilian footballer

== See also ==
- Rafael (footballer, born 1979), full name Rafael da Silva Santos, Brazilian football defender
- Coutinho (footballer, born 1984), full name Rafael Coutinho Barcellos dos Santos, Brazilian football defensive midfielder
