= Juan Núñez (basketball) =

Spanish basketball player (born 2004)

- Núñez in 2026

No. 17 – FC Barcelona
- Position: Point guard
- League: Liga ACB; EuroLeague

Personal information
- Born: 4 June 2004 (age 22) Madrid, Spain
- Listed height: 1.97 m (6 ft 6 in)
- Listed weight: 190 lb (86 kg)

Career information
- NBA draft: 2024: 2nd round, 36th overall pick
- Drafted by: Indiana Pacers
- Playing career: 2020–present

Career history
- 2020–2021: Real Madrid B
- 2021–2022: Real Madrid
- 2022–2024: Ratiopharm Ulm
- 2024–present: FC Barcelona

Career highlights
- German BBL champion (2023); Spanish League champion (2022); Spanish Supercup winner (2021); EuroLeague NGT champion (2021)
- Stats at NBA.com
- Stats at Basketball Reference
Medals
Men's basketball
Representing Spain
FIBA U16 European Championship
Gold medal – first place	2019 Italy	Team
FIBA U20 European Championship
Gold medal – first place	2022 Montenegro	Team

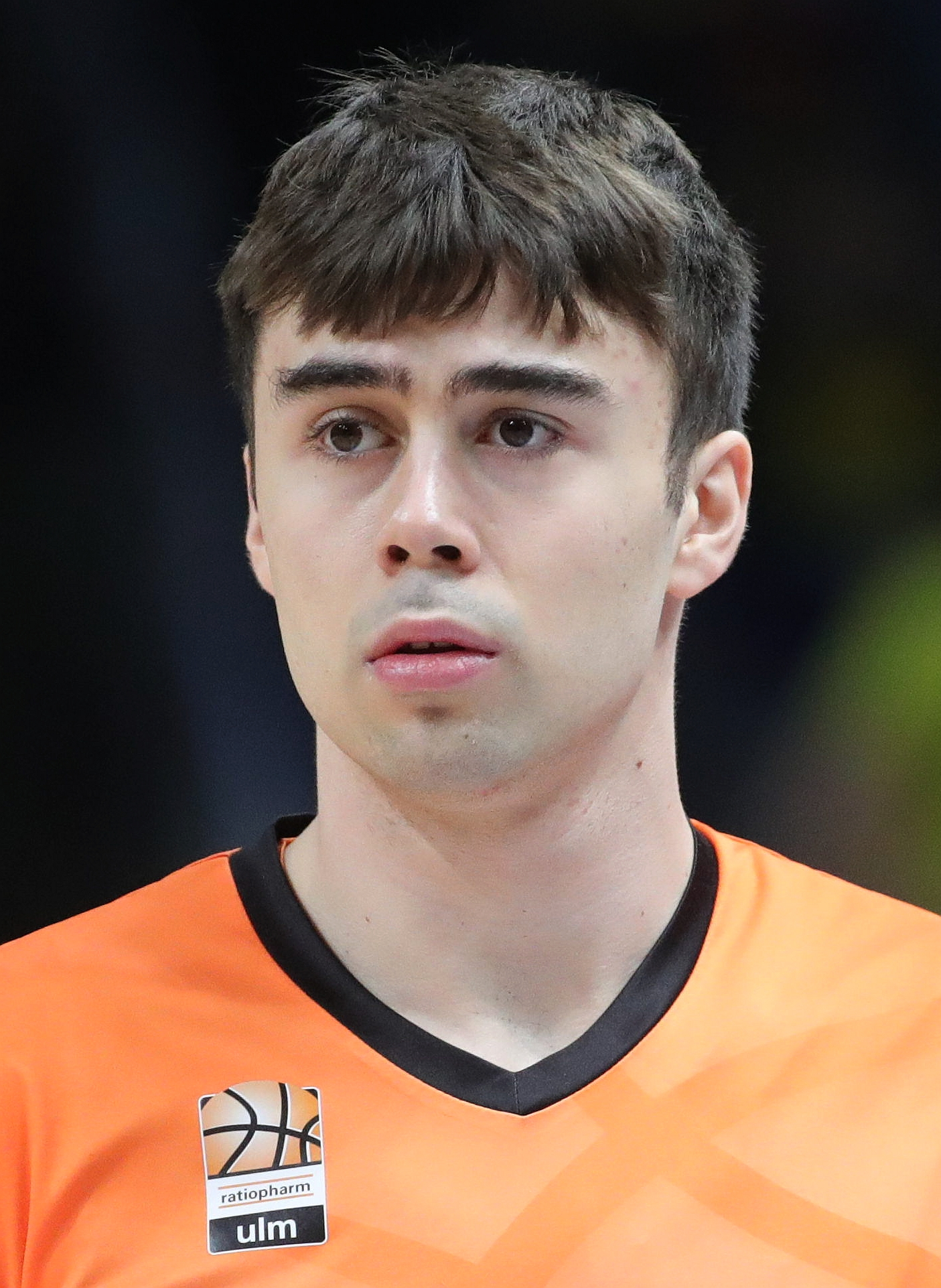

Juan Núñez García (born 4 June 2004) is a Spanish professional basketball player for FC Barcelona of the Liga ACB and the EuroLeague. He plays at the point guard position.

== Professional career ==
=== Real Madrid (2015–2022) ===
Born in Madrid, Núñez joined Real Madrid's youth ranks in 2015. In his junior years, he stood out with his passing ability. He was named MVP of the 2019–20 Euroleague Next Generation Tournament qualifying tournament in Munich, averaging 9.5 points and five assists in four games.

In 2021, Núñez won the Euroleague Next Generation Tournament with Real Madrid. Although he played in the group games, he did not feature in the final, as he was called up by Pablo Laso to the senior team amidst an injury crisis within the squad.

On 6 June 2021, Núñez made his debut for Real Madrid's senior team in an ACB semi-final win against Valencia Basket, scoring two points from the free-throw line and adding two rebounds and one assist in seven minutes of play. He was the 16th youth academy player to be introduced to the senior team by Pablo Laso.

=== Ratiopharm Ulm (2022–2024) ===
On 15 August 2022, he signed with Ratiopharm Ulm of the German Basketball Bundesliga. He captured the German championship title with Ulm in the 2022–23 season.

=== FC Barcelona (2024–present) ===
On 26 July 2024, FC Barcelona signed Núñez on a three-year contract through to 30 June 2027. In February 2025, Barcelona reported Núñez would be temporarily unavailable due to swelling on his right knee, after several weeks playing with discomfort. In March, his injury would be confirmed as a meniscus tear, putting an end to his season. Núñez underwent surgery, with an expected recovery time of six months.

On September 25, 2025, it was announced that Núñez would have to undergo arthroscopic surgery on his right knee due to an inflammatory reaction. He had ruptured the same knee's external meniscus in March. Núñez was finally cleared to return to the court in April 2026, joining the Barcelona roster for round 37 of the 2025–26 EuroLeague regular season.

=== NBA draft rights ===
On 27 June 2024, Núñez was selected with the 36th overall pick by the Indiana Pacers in the 2024 NBA draft, however, immediately on draft night, he was traded to the San Antonio Spurs along with cash in exchange for the 35th overall pick in the 2024 draft, Johnny Furphy.

== Career statistics ==
Legend
GP	Games played	GS	Games started	MPG	Minutes per game
FG%	Field-goal percentage	3P%	3-point field-goal percentage	FT%	Free-throw percentage
RPG	Rebounds per game	APG	Assists per game	SPG	Steals per game
BPG	Blocks per game	PPG	Points per game	PIR	Performance index rating
**Bold**	Career high

=== EuroLeague ===
Year	Team	GP	GS	MPG	FG%	3P%	FT%	RPG	APG	SPG	BPG	PPG	PIR
2021–22	Real Madrid	10	0	4.4	.375	**.667**	.000	.2	.8	.3	.0	1.4	1.0
2024–25	Barcelona	**25**	**5**	**15.3**	**.534**	.275	**.650**	**2.5**	**3.4**	**.8**	.0	**5.0**	**7.4**
Career		35	5	12.2	.500	.302	.650	1.9	2.6	.7	.0	3.9	5.4

=== EuroCup ===
Year	Team	GP	GS	MPG	FG%	3P%	FT%	RPG	APG	SPG	BPG	PPG	PIR
2022–23	Ratiopharm Ulm	**20**	0	20.3	.434	**.361**	.574	3.3	4.5	1.1	.0	7.6	9.0
2023–24	Ratiopharm Ulm	15	**14**	**25.4**	**.504**	.350	**.583**	**3.6**	**5.7**	**1.9**	**.1**	**10.8**	**14.0**
Career		35	14	22.3	.469	.355	.579	3.4	5.0	1.5	.0	9.0	12.1
