= Eli Ndiaye =

Spanish basketball player (born 2004)

- Ndiaye with Joventut in 2026

No. 44 – Real Madrid
- Position: Power forward / center
- League: Liga ACB; EuroLeague

Personal information
- Born: 26 June 2004 (age 22) Guediawaye, Senegal
- Listed height: 2.04 m (6 ft 8 in)
- Listed weight: 95 kg (209 lb)

Career information
- NBA draft: 2025: undrafted
- Playing career: 2021–present

Career history
- 2021–2025: Real Madrid
- 2021–2022: →Real Madrid B
- 2025: College Park Skyhawks
- 2026–present: Real Madrid
- 2026: →Joventut Badalona

Career highlights
- EuroLeague champion (2023); 3× Liga ACB champion (2022, 2024, 2025); Spanish Cup winner (2024); 4x Spanish Supercup winner (2021–2023, 2026); EB Next Generation Tournament champion (2021); EB Next Generation Tournament MVP (2021)
- Stats at NBA.com
- Stats at Basketball Reference

Eli John Ndiaye Faye (born 26 June 2004) is a Senegalese-Spanish professional basketball player for Real Madrid of the Liga ACB and the EuroLeague.

== Early life and youth career ==
Ndiaye was born in Guédiawaye, Senegal.

In 2017, at just 13 years old, he joined Real Madrid's youth team.

Ndiaye quickly made a name for himself within the white team, helping them secure the 2018 Minicopa.

During the summer of 2020, he obtained Spanish citizenship through naturalization.

In the 2020–21 season, Ndiaye was a key player on the junior team and participated in the 2021, where he earned several MVP awards. He also contributed to Real Madrid's victory in the Spanish Super Cup.

== Professional career ==
=== Real Madrid (2021–2025) ===
In the 2021–22 season, he would be part of the Real Madrid's Liga EBA subsidiary.

Ndiaye made his debut in the EuroLeague in September 2021 with Real Madrid, playing against Fenerbahce. His opportunity arose when Edy Tavares took paternity leave. He became the seventeenth young player to make his debut under the guidance of coach Pablo Laso.

During the 2022–23 season, he became a regular member of Real Madrid's first team in the Liga ACB.

=== College Park Skyhawks (2025) ===
On July 3, 2025, Ndiaye signed a two-way contract with the Atlanta Hawks of the National Basketball Association (NBA). After having season-ending surgery to repair a torn labrum before making his NBA debut, he was waived on December 31, after only appearing for the College Park Skyhawks of the NBA G League.

=== Return to Real Madrid (2026–present) ===
On August 17, 2026, Ndiaye signed a two-year deal with Real Madrid of the Spanish Liga ACB and the EuroLeague.

==== Loan to Joventut Badalona (2026) ====
On 11 September 2026, Ndiaye was loaned to Joventut Badalona of the Spanish Liga ACB. On 15 November 2026, Ndiaye was called off loan by Real Madrid.

== Career statistics ==
Legend
GP	Games played	GS	Games started	MPG	Minutes per game
FG%	Field-goal percentage	3P%	3-point field-goal percentage	FT%	Free-throw percentage
RPG	Rebounds per game	APG	Assists per game	SPG	Steals per game
BPG	Blocks per game	PPG	Points per game	PIR	Performance index rating
**Bold**	Career high

=== EuroLeague ===
†	Denotes seasons in which Ndiaye won the EuroLeague

Year	Team	GP	GS	MPG	FG%	3P%	FT%	RPG	APG	SPG	BPG	PPG	PIR
2021–22	Real Madrid	4	0	3.5	**1.000**	—	—	.3	.3	.3	—	1.0	1.5
2022–23†	Real Madrid	15	3	5.7	.462	.167	**1.000**	1.2	.1	.2	**.3**	1.1	1.5
2023–24	Real Madrid	23	13	11.2	.455	.320	.667	2.3	**.5**	.4	.2	2.9	3.3
2024–25	Real Madrid	**25**	**19**	**14.0**	.429	**.341**	.667	**2.4**	.5	**.6**	.1	**3.6**	**4.2**
Career		67	35	10.5	.449	.320	.714	2.0	.4	.4	.2	2.6	3.1
