= Konstantin Kostadinov =

Bulgarian basketball player

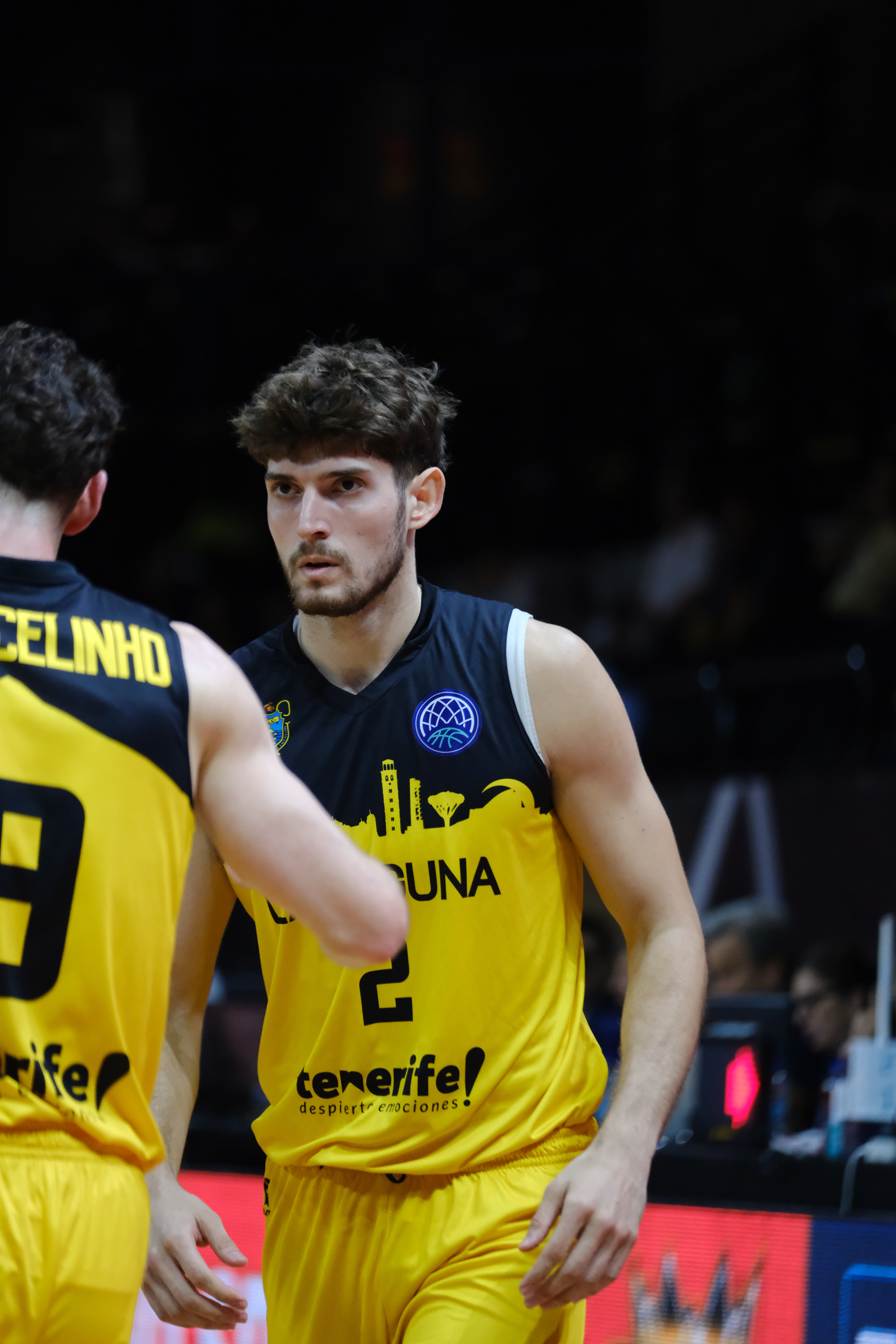
- Kostadinov with Canarias in 2025

No. 15 – BC Oostende
- Position: Small forward / power forward
- League: BNXT League

Personal information
- Born: 25 March 2003 (age 23) Burgas, Bulgaria
- Listed height: 2.03 m (6 ft 8 in)
- Listed weight: 96 kg (212 lb)

Career information
- Playing career: 2020–present

Career history
- 2020–2021: Real Madrid B
- 2021–2022: Palma
- 2022–2025: Tenerife
- 2022–2023: → Palencia
- 2023–2024: → HLA Alicante
- 2025–present: BC Andorra
- 2026–present: → BC Oostende

Career highlights
- EuroLeague NGT champion (2021)

Konstantin Iroslavov Kostadinov (Bulgarian: Константин Ирославов Костадинов; born 25 March 2003) is a Bulgarian professional basketball player for BC Oostende of the BNXT League on loan from BC Andorra. He plays as a small forward or power forward.

== Early life and youth career ==
Kostadinov began playing basketball at BC Delfin Burgas. In June 2016, he was signed by Real Madrid to play for their youth ranks.

Kostadinov became the MVP of the 2017 Copa del Rey Junior averaging 15.4 points, 9.6 rebounds and 21.6 PIR per game.

In 2021, he won the Euroleague Basketball Next Generation Tournament with Real Madrid, recording a double-double of 18 points and 12 rebounds in the championship game against Barcelona.

== College career ==
On 11 July 2026, Kostadinov was announced for the NCAA Division I roster Mississippi State Bulldogs for the 26–27 season. However in August 2026, he was loaned out to BC Oostende, reversing his decision to move NCAA.

== Professional career ==
On 6 August 2021, Kostadinov signed with Palmer Alma Mediterrànea Palma of the Spanish second division, the LEB Oro. On 3 March 2022, he scored career-high 31 points, adding 10 rebounds and 2 assists in a 98–90 win against Força Lleida.

On 4 August 2022, Kostadinov signed a multi-year contract with Lenovo Tenerife of the Liga ACB and was immediately loaned to Zunder Palencia of the LEB Oro for the 2022–23 season. On 1 August 2023, he was loaned to HLA Alicante of the LEB Oro.

On December 15, 2025, he signed with MoraBanc Andorra on a three-year deal. In August 2026, he was loaned out to BC Oostende of the BNXT League.

== National team career ==
Kostadinov helped Bulgaria U16 finish 6th in the 2019 FIBA U16 European Championship Division B, averaging 9.8 PPG, 4.9 RPG and 1.1 APG. On 22 February 2021, he made his debut for the senior team in a EuroBasket 2022 qualification game against Bosnia and Herzegovina, becoming the youngest ever debutant for the team at 17 years, 10 months and 28 days of age. He scored 11 points in a 61–80 loss.
