= Rafael Santos (footballer, born 1997) =

Portuguese association football player

Personal information
- Full name: Rafael Vicente Ferreira Santos
- Date of birth: 14 February 1997 (age 29)
- Place of birth: Cascais, Portugal
- Height: 1.87 m (6 ft 2 in)
- Position: Midfielder

Team information
- Current team: Birkirkara

Youth career
- 2008–2012: Sporting CP
- 2012–2014: Estoril
- 2014–2015: Real SC
- 2015–2016: Oeiras
- 2016: Casa Pia

Senior career*
Years	Team	Apps	(Gls)
2016–2018	Moura	30	(0)
2018–2019	Olímpico Montijo	24	(1)
2019–2020	Amora	17	(0)
2020	Fátima	5	(2)
2020–2021	Oriental	20	(4)
2021–2022	Belenenses SAD	3	(0)
2022–2023	Real	19	(2)
2023–2024	Stal Mielec	13	(0)
2024–2025	Al-Shabab Club		
2025–2026	Górnik Łęczna	13	(1)
2026–	Birkirkara	0	(0)
- * Club domestic league appearances and goals as of 17:55, 1 April 2026 (UTC)

Rafael "Rafa" Vicente Ferreira Santos (born 14 February 1997) is a Portuguese professional footballer who plays as a midfielder for Maltese Premier League club Birkirkara.

== Club career ==
Santos is a youth product of Flamengo, Estoril, Real SC, Oeiras and Casa Pia. He spent most of his early career in the Campeonato de Portugal . He began his senior career with Moura, and followed that with stints at Olímpico Montijo, Amora Fátima, and Oriental. On 19 June 2019, he signed a three-year contract with Belenenses SAD in the Primeira Liga. Santos was called to the senior team after a COVID-19 outbreak hit the squad. One of only 9 starters in the squad for the match, he made his professional debut with B-SAD in a 7–0 Primeira Liga loss to Benfica on 24 July 2021 that ended up being called off.

On 14 July 2023, Ekstraklasa side Stal Mielec announced the signing of Santos on a two-year deal, with an option for another year. He and Stal agreed to part ways on 6 September 2024.

In October 2024, Santos signed with Bahraini side Al-Shabab Club. He made 16 appearances and scored twice for Al-Shabab across the 2024–25 season.

On 1 August 2025, Santos returned to Poland to join I liga club Górnik Łęczna on a two-year contract. On 1 April 2026, he unilaterally terminated his contract, citing "unsuitable conditions".

On 1 July 2026, Santos signed with Maltese Premier League side Birkirkara.
