= Ștefan Grasu =

Romanian basketball player

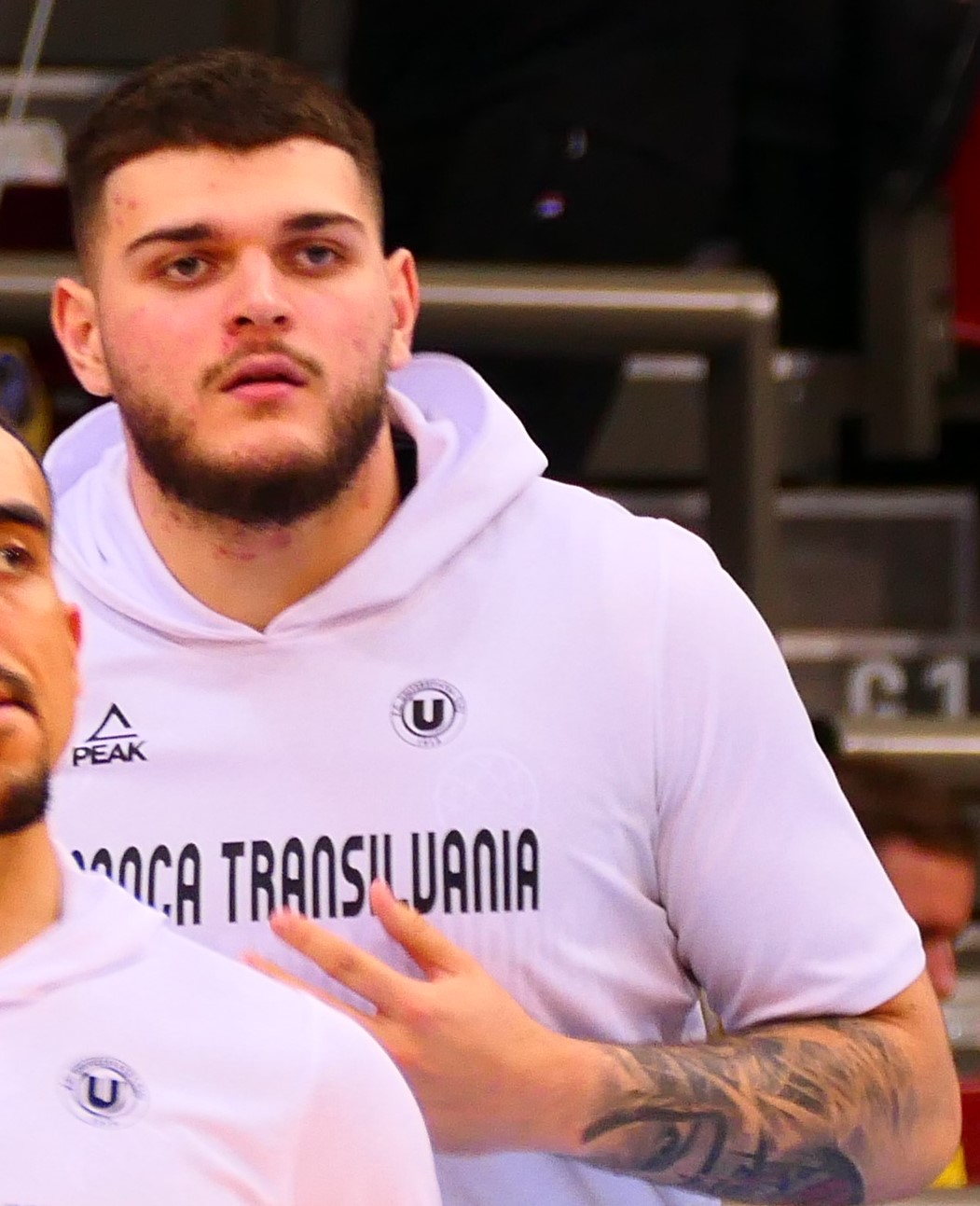
- Grasu with U-BT Cluj-Napoca in April 2022

No. 11 – CS Dinamo București
- Position: Power forward/center
- League: Liga Națională

Personal information
- Born: 16 February 2003 (age 23) Bucharest, Romania
- Listed height: 6 ft 7 in (2.01 m)

Career information
- Playing career: 2018–present

Career history
- 2018–2019: CS Dinamo București
- 2019–2022: U-BT Cluj-Napoca
- 2022–present: CS Dinamo București

Career highlights
- 2x Romanian League champion (2021, 2022); 1× Most Valuable Player Romanian National U-20 Tournament (2022)

Ștefan Grasu is a Romanian professional basketball player for Dinamo București of the Liga Națională.

== Early life ==
Ștefan was born to Nicoleta and Costel Grasu, both discus throwers for Romania at the Summer Olympics.

He went to school in Vatra Luminoasă (Northeast Bucharest).

When he was 9 years old, he was already a champion in his age group in discus throw. Yet, soon thereafter he started basketball.

== Club career ==
At age 12, he scored 75 points in a youth game, an unmatched record in Romanian basketball.

As a youth player he was with CS Dinamo București. In 2019, he signed with U-BT Cluj-Napoca.

In April 2022, Grasu played at the national U-20 tournament in the BTarena. He played alongside Toma Lungoci, Luca Colceag, David Lăpuște and Alexandu Pașca who all have capped for Cluj’s senior team. U-BT Cluj-Napoca became the tournament champion after beating CS Dinamo București 88-76 in the final. Ștefan Grasu was named MVP of the final match where he scored 31 points and recorded 15 rebounds.

== National team ==
Stefan Grasu played for Romania's under-16 national team on several occasions.

== Player profile ==
Ever since his childhood, Grasu was noticed not only for his immense size and wingspan but also for his shooting, dribbling and ball-handling ability.
