= Michael Caicedo =

Spanish basketball player

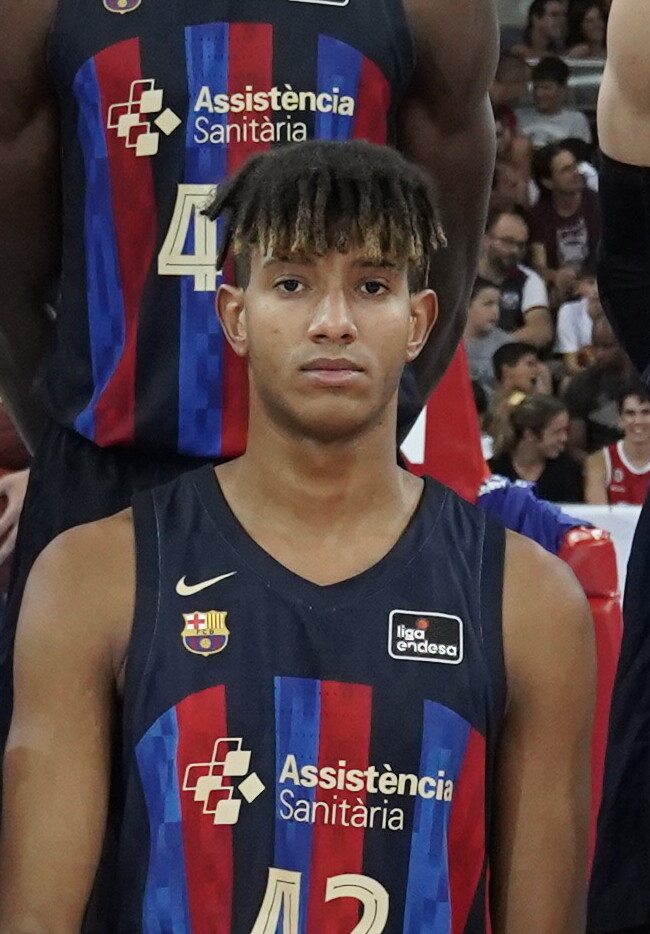
- Caicedo with FC Barcelona in 2022

No. 42 – Obradoiro CAB
- Position: Shooting guard / small forward
- League: Liga ACB

Personal information
- Born: 21 June 2003 (age 23) Inca, Spain
- Listed height: 6 ft 6 in (1.98 m)
- Listed weight: 198 lb (90 kg)

Career information
- NBA draft: 2025: undrafted
- Playing career: 2020–present

Career history
- 2020–2024: FC Barcelona
- 2020–2021: →FC Barcelona B
- 2022–2023: →Granada
- 2024: →Girona
- 2024–2025: Força Lleida
- 2025: Stade Rochelais
- 2025–2026: Grand Rapids Gold
- 2026: Melilla
- 2026–present: Obradoiro CAB

Career highlights
- ACB All-Young Players Team (2023)
Medals
Men's basketball
Representing Spain
FIBA U16 European Championship
Gold medal – first place	2019 Italy	Team

Michael Caicedo Sánchez (born June 21, 2003) is a Colombian-Spanish professional basketball player for Obradoiro CAB of the Liga ACB.

== Early life and youth career ==
Michael was born in Inca, Mallorca and he is the son of a Colombian father and a Spanish mother. In December 2020, he was named MVP of the Euroleague Basketball Next Generation Tournament in Valencia.

== Professional career ==
Caicedo made his senior debut for Barcelona in the Liga ACB on January 9, 2021, against Manresa. On October 28, 2021, he made his EuroLeague debut playing 21 seconds against Maccabi Tel Aviv. While still a Barcelona player, Caicedo was loaned to Granada in the 2022-23 ACB season and later to Girona in the 2023-24 ACB season.

Caicedo's time at Barcelona ended in July 2024 after reaching an agreement with the club to terminate his contract. On July 22, 2024, Caicedo was announced as a new Força Lleida player for the 2024-25 ACB season. Lleida and Caicedo would reach a mutual agreement to terminate the player's contract before the end of the season.

On March 31, 2025, Caicedo was announced as a new player for Stade Rochelais of the LNB Élite.

After signing for the Grand Rapids Gold of the G League in July 2025, Caicedo returned to Spain in February 2026, signing for Club Melilla Baloncesto of the Primera FEB.

== Career statistics ==
Legend
GP	Games played	GS	Games started	MPG	Minutes per game
FG%	Field-goal percentage	3P%	3-point field-goal percentage	FT%	Free-throw percentage
RPG	Rebounds per game	APG	Assists per game	SPG	Steals per game
BPG	Blocks per game	PPG	Points per game	PIR	Performance index rating
**Bold**	Career high

=== EuroLeague ===
Year	Team	GP	GS	MPG	FG%	3P%	FT%	RPG	APG	SPG	BPG	PPG	PIR
2021–22	Barcelona	11	1	8.6	.400	.250	.500	1.4	.5	.2	—	2.1	1.4
Career		11	1	8.6	.400	.250	.500	1.4	.5	.2	—	2.1	1.4
