= James Nnaji =

Nigerian basketball player (born 2004)

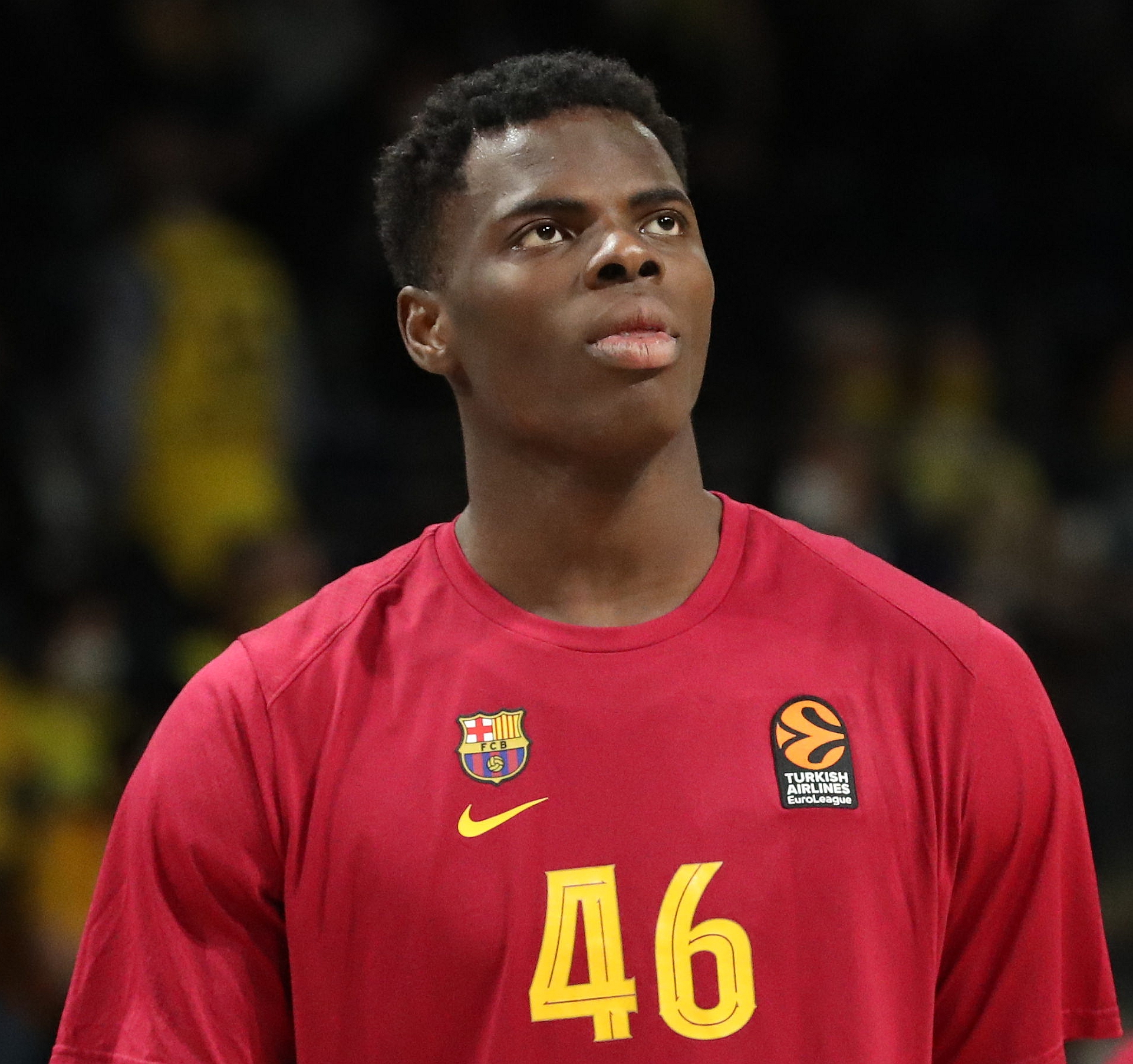
- Nnaji with FC Barcelona in 2022

George Mason Patriots
- Position: Center
- Conference: Atlantic 10 Conference

Personal information
- Born: 14 August 2004 (age 22) Makurdi, Nigeria
- Listed height: 7 ft 0 in (2.13 m)
- Listed weight: 250 lb (113 kg)

Career information
- College: Baylor (2026); George Mason (2026–present)
- NBA draft: 2023: 2nd round, 31st overall pick
- Drafted by: Detroit Pistons
- Playing career: 2019–2025

Career history
- 2019–2020: Rátgéber Akadémia
- 2020–2025: FC Barcelona
- 2020–2021: →FC Barcelona B
- 2024–2025: →Girona
- 2025: →Merkezefendi

Career highlights
- Liga ACB champion (2023)
- Stats at NBA.com
- Stats at Basketball Reference

James Ugochukwu Nnaji (/ˈnɑːdʒi/ NAH-jee; born 14 August 2004) is a Nigerian college basketball player for the George Mason Patriots of the Atlantic 10 Conference. He was selected 31st overall in the 2023 NBA draft by the Detroit Pistons, but his rights were traded to the Charlotte Hornets and later the New York Knicks.

== Early life and youth career ==
Nnaji grew up in Makurdi, Middle Belt of Nigeria, where he started playing basketball. He is from the Eastern region of Nigeria. In 2018, Nnaji moved to Ratgeber Basketball Academy in Hungary.

== College career ==
On December 24, 2025, Nnaji enrolled to play in the Big 12 Conference for the Baylor Bears. He appeared in 18 games for Baylor, logging averages of 1.4 points, 2.4 rebounds, and 0.2 assists.

On July 2, 2026, Nnaji transferred to play for the George Mason Patriots.

== Professional career ==
=== Rátgéber Akadémia ===
Nnaji started his career with Rátgéber Akadémia, a team in the Hungarian league.

=== FC Barcelona (2020–2025) ===
He moved from Hungary to Barcelona in 2020, joining FC Barcelona B in 2020. From there, he would move up to the A team of FC Barcelona in 2021, making thirteen appearances in the 2021–22 season.

On 4 August 2024, Nnaji was loaned to Girona of the Spanish Liga ACB. Nnaji's spell at Girona ended in March 2025 after a mutual agreement between the club and the player. On 28 March, FC Barcelona announced Nnaji would spend the remainder of the season on loan at Merkezefendi Belediyesi Denizli of the Basketbol Süper Ligi.

On 18 July 2025, Nnaji confirmed during an NBA Summer League interview that he and Barcelona would be mutually opting out of the two remaining years of their contract. Barcelona officially announced it was parting ways with Nnaji on 1 August.

=== NBA rights ===
Nnaji declared for the 2023 NBA draft, where he was ranked as the 24th-best prospect in the ESPN Top 100. On 22 June 2023, Nnaji was selected 31st overall in the 2023 NBA draft by the Detroit Pistons, who then traded him to the Charlotte Hornets. In 2024, his rights were traded to the New York Knicks along with Karl-Anthony Towns as part of a 3-team trade.

== Career statistics ==
Legend
GP	Games played	GS	Games started	MPG	Minutes per game
FG%	Field-goal percentage	3P%	3-point field-goal percentage	FT%	Free-throw percentage
RPG	Rebounds per game	APG	Assists per game	SPG	Steals per game
BPG	Blocks per game	PPG	Points per game	PIR	Performance index rating
**Bold**	Career high

=== EuroLeague ===
Year	Team	GP	GS	MPG	FG%	3P%	FT%	RPG	APG	SPG	BPG	PPG	PIR
2021–22	Barcelona	13	**2**	5.8	.750	—	.000	**1.7**	.2	—	.4	1.8	2.5
2022–23	Barcelona	**19**	0	**6.4**	**.762**	—	**.462**	1.3	**.4**	—	**.5**	2.0	2.7
2023–24	Barcelona	**19**	0	5.6	.720	—	.419	1.4	.2	**.2**	.3	**2.6**	**3.0**
Career		51	2	6.0	.742	—	.396	1.5	.2	.1	.4	2.2	2.8

=== Domestic leagues ===
Year	Team	League	GP	MPG	FG%	3P%	FT%	RPG	APG	SPG	BPG	PPG
2020–21	(Spain) Barcelona B	LEB Plata	12	9.3	.696	—	.214	2.7	.4	.1	1.1	2.9
2021–22	(Spain) Barcelona	ACB	12	6.8	.786	—	.444	1.4	.2	.1	.7	2.2
2022–23	(Spain) Barcelona	ACB	35	10.5	.697	—	.538	2.6	.2	.2	.6	4.3
2023–24	(Spain) Barcelona	ACB	26	8.3	.649	—	.647	2.2	.1	.1	.5	2.3
