= 2023 FIBA U20 European Championship =

24th edition of the European basketball championship

Ευρωπαϊκό Πρωτάθλημα Καλαθοσφαίρισης Νέων Ανδρών 2023

Tournament details
- Host country: Greece
- City: Heraklion
- Dates: 8–16 July 2023
- Teams: 16 (from 1 confederation)
- Venues: 2 (in 1 host city)

Final positions
- Champions: France (2nd title)
- Runners-up: Israel
- Third place: Greece
- Fourth place: Belgium

Tournament statistics
- Games played: 56
- MVP: (France) Ilias Kamardine
- Top scorer: (Iceland) Orri Gunnarsson (18.3 ppg)
- Top rebounds: (Israel) Danny Wolf (12.0 rpg)
- Top assists: (Israel) Noam Yaacov (7.6 apg)
- PPG (Team): France (89.9 ppg)
- RPG (Team): Belgium (42.9 rpg)
- APG (Team): France (24.9 apg)

Official website
- www.fiba.basketball

The 2023 FIBA U20 European Championship was the 24th edition of the European basketball championship for men's national under-20 teams. It was played from 8 to 16 July 2023 in Heraklion, Greece.

== Participating teams ==
- Belgium
- Croatia
- Estonia ▲ (Third place, 2022 FIBA U20 European Championship Division B)
- France
- Germany
- Greece
- Iceland ▲ (Runner-up, 2022 FIBA U20 European Championship Division B)
- Israel
- Italy
- Lithuania
- Montenegro
- Poland
- Serbia ▲ (Winner, 2022 FIBA U20 European Championship Division B)
- Slovenia
- Spain
- Turkey

== First round ==
The draw of the first round was held on 14 February 2023 in Freising, Germany.

In the first round, the teams were drawn into four groups of four. All teams advance to the playoffs.

All times are local (Eastern European Summer Time – UTC+3).

=== Group A ===
Pos	Team	Pld	W	L	PF	PA	PD	Pts
1	Turkey	3	2	1	195	205	−10	5
2	Belgium	3	2	1	209	188	+21	5
3	Italy	3	1	2	182	177	+5	4
4	Israel	3	1	2	190	206	−16	4

Source: FIBA

8 July 2023
18:30

Boxscore

Belgium	72–64	Italy
Scoring by quarter: 15–22, 18–15, 21–17, 18–10
Pts: De Ridder 20; Rebs: De Ridder 11; Asts: Pouedet 3		Pts: Casarin 14; Rebs: Vincini 7 Asts: Berdini 5

Heraklion University Hall
Referees: Gintaras Vitkauskas (LTU), Łukasz Jankowski (POL), Stylianos Simeonidis (GRE)

8 July 2023
18:30

Boxscore

Israel	86–70	Turkey
Scoring by quarter: 24–18, 21–14, 19–19, 22–19
Pts: Zipper 20; Rebs: Aizik, Wolf 6 Asts: Yaacov 14		Pts: Yiğitoğlu 18; Rebs: Yiğitoğlu 12; Asts: Kuntker 3

Heraklion University Hall
Referees: Martin Vulić (CRO), Davíð Tómasson (ISL), Domen Krajnc (SVN)

9 July 2023
16:00

Boxscore

Italy	66–50	Israel
Scoring by quarter: 14–15, 21–17, 15–8, 16–10
Pts: Maretto 10; Rebs: Onojaife 7 Asts: Boglio 8		Pts: Yaacov 18; Rebs: Wolf 11; Asts: three players 3

Heraklion Arena "Dyo Aorakia"
Referees: Gvidas Gedvilas (LTU), Péter Praksch (HUN), Patrick Müller (DEU)

9 July 2023
21:00

Boxscore

Turkey	70–67	Belgium
Scoring by quarter: 12–11, 20–19, 22–23, 16–14
Pts: Yiğitoğlu 14; Rebs: Yiğitoğlu 12; Asts: Yıldızoğlu 4		Pts: De Ridder 26; Rebs: De Ridder 15; Asts: De Ridder 6

Heraklion Arena "Dyo Aorakia"
Referees: Martins Kozlovskis (LAT), Martin Vulić (CRO), Davíð Tómasson (ISL)

10 July 2023
16:00

Boxscore

Turkey	55–52	Italy
Scoring by quarter: 8–8, 14–13, 14–16, 19–15
Pts: Büyüktuncel 26; Rebs: Büyüktuncel 8 Asts: Yıldızoğlu 7		Pts: Vincini 15; Rebs: Loro 8 Asts: four players 3

Heraklion University Hall
Referees: Gintaras Vitkauskas (LTU), Mihkel Männiste (EST), Łukasz Jankowski (POL)

10 July 2023
21:00

Boxscore

Belgium	70–54	Israel
Scoring by quarter: 20–19, 19–18, 13–11, 18–6
Pts: Di Maria 19; Rebs: Pintelon 15; Asts: De Ridder 4		Pts: Wolf 24; Rebs: Wolf 9 Asts: Yaacov 8

Heraklion University Hall
Referees: Marius Ciulin (ROM), Stylianos Simeonidis (GRE), Davíð Tómasson (ISL)

=== Group B ===
Pos	Team	Pld	W	L	PF	PA	PD	Pts
1	Spain	3	3	0	257	178	+79	6
2	Serbia	3	2	1	211	206	+5	5
3	Estonia	3	1	2	198	234	−36	4
4	Montenegro	3	0	3	211	259	−48	3

Source: FIBA

8 July 2023
13:30

Boxscore

Estonia	61–82	Serbia
Scoring by quarter: 16–24, 19–19, 14–17, 12–22
Pts: Veesaar 13; Rebs: Veesaar 7 Asts: Malm 5		Pts: Šaranović 17; Rebs: Petrović 8 Asts: Šaranović 6

Heraklion University Hall
Referees: Gvidas Gedvilas (LTU), Péter Praksch (HUN), Alin Faur (ROM)

8 July 2023
16:00

Boxscore

Spain	103–68	Montenegro
Scoring by quarter: 21–17, 30–12, 25–21, 27–18
Pts: Domínguez 23; Rebs: López 7 Asts: Núñez 6		Pts: Jovanović 20; Rebs: Jovanović 5 Asts: four players 2

Heraklion University Hall
Referees: Martins Kozlovskis (LAT), Alexandre Maret (FRA), Patrick Müller (DEU)

9 July 2023
13:30

Boxscore

Montenegro	74–81	Estonia
Scoring by quarter: 19–23, 20–24, 16–19, 19–15
Pts: Bogavac 25; Rebs: Bogavac 7 Asts: Bogavac 4		Pts: Poom 20; Rebs: Kuuba 18; Asts: Välb 9

Heraklion Arena "Dyo Aorakia"
Referees: Gintaras Vitkauskas (LTU), Stylianos Simeonidis (GRE), Domen Krajnc (SVN)

9 July 2023
21:00

Boxscore

Serbia	54–76	Spain
Scoring by quarter: 17–17, 11–18, 16–24, 10–17
Pts: Petrović 14; Rebs: Šaranović 7 Asts: Šaranović 5		Pts: Caicedo, López 15; Rebs: López 7 Asts: Núñez 8

Heraklion University Hall
Referees: Marius Ciulin (ROM), Łukasz Jankowski (POL), Alexandre Maret (FRA)

10 July 2023
16:00

Boxscore

Montenegro	69–75	Serbia
Scoring by quarter: 22–18, 13–20, 17–20, 17–17
Pts: Vukčević 17; Rebs: Vučeljić 12; Asts: Ivanović 4		Pts: Petrović 17; Rebs: Belić 9 Asts: Stefanović 8

Heraklion Arena "Dyo Aorakia"
Referees: Martins Kozlovskis (LAT), Gvidas Gedvilas (LTU), Alexandre Maret (FRA)

10 July 2023
21:00

Boxscore

Estonia	56–78	Spain
Scoring by quarter: 21–15, 9–32, 6–23, 20–8
Pts: Poom 11; Rebs: Andre, Poom 5 Asts: Sepp 4		Pts: Núñez 17; Rebs: Caicedo 6 Asts: Rodríguez 5

Heraklion Arena "Dyo Aorakia"
Referees: Martin Vulić (CRO), Pavel Fuska (SVK), Patrick Müller (DEU)

=== Group C ===
Pos	Team	Pld	W	L	PF	PA	PD	Pts
1	Lithuania	3	3	0	239	197	+42	6
2	Greece (H)	3	2	1	212	211	+1	5
3	Croatia	3	1	2	195	217	−22	4
4	Poland	3	0	3	188	209	−21	3

Source: FIBA
(H) Hosts

8 July 2023
18:30

Boxscore

Poland	67–72	Greece
Scoring by quarter: 19–21, 17–14, 12–18, 19–19
Pts: Piśla, Wińkowski 15; Rebs: Urbaniak 15; Asts: Wiśniewski 6		Pts: Zougris 24; Rebs: Zougris 17; Asts: Oikonomopoulos 6

Heraklion Arena "Dyo Aorakia"
Referees: Ademir Zurapović (BIH), Alberto Sánchez Sixto (ESP), Can Mavisu (TUR)

8 July 2023
21:00

Boxscore

Lithuania	86–67	Croatia
Scoring by quarter: 20–17, 23–9, 26–24, 17–17
Pts: Krivas, Lelevičius 15; Rebs: Krivas 8 Asts: Sargiūnas 5		Pts: Brala, Z. Ivišić 12; Rebs: Brala 5 Asts: Brala 4

Heraklion Arena "Dyo Aorakia"
Referees: Marius Ciulin (ROM), Mihkel Männiste (EST), Pavel Fuska (SVK)

9 July 2023
16:00

Boxscore

Croatia	64–53	Poland
Scoring by quarter: 15–16, 16–13, 20–16, 13–8
Pts: Z. Ivišić 17; Rebs: T. Ivišić 11; Asts: Rajaofera 5		Pts: Wilczek 12; Rebs: Andrzejewski, Urbaniak 5 Asts: Wiśniewski 4

Heraklion University Hall
Referees: Beniamino Attard (ITA), Alberto Sánchez Sixto (ESP), Alin Faur (ROM)

9 July 2023
18:30

Boxscore

Greece	62–80	Lithuania
Scoring by quarter: 16–27, 20–16, 9–19, 17–18
Pts: Mantzoukas 14; Rebs: Mermigkis, Zougris 6 Asts: Mantzoukas 3		Pts: Lelevičius 19; Rebs: Krivas 12; Asts: Kublickas 4

Heraklion Arena "Dyo Aorakia"
Referees: Manuel Mazzoni (ITA), Radomir Vojnović (MNE), Mihkel Männiste (EST)

10 July 2023
13:30

Boxscore

Poland	68–73	Lithuania
Scoring by quarter: 14–20, 21–14, 15–26, 18–13
Pts: Wińkowski 17; Rebs: Wińkowski 10; Asts: Wiśniewski 5		Pts: Lelevičius 20; Rebs: Bartninkas 8 Asts: Kublickas 5

Heraklion University Hall
Referees: Radomir Vojnović (MNE), Mehmet Şahin (TUR), Chess van Looy (BEL)

10 July 2023
18:30

Boxscore

Croatia	64–78	Greece
Scoring by quarter: 18–19, 15–13, 16–27, 15–19
Pts: Brala 18; Rebs: Rajaofera 8 Asts: Brala 7		Pts: Mantzoukas 24; Rebs: Zougris 11; Asts: Bazinas 6

Heraklion Arena "Dyo Aorakia"
Referees: Manuel Mazzoni (ITA), Péter Praksch (HUN), Beniamino Attard (ITA)

=== Group D ===
Pos	Team	Pld	W	L	PF	PA	PD	Pts
1	France	3	3	0	271	169	+102	6
2	Germany	3	2	1	210	219	−9	5
3	Iceland	3	1	2	196	261	−65	4
4	Slovenia	3	0	3	187	215	−28	3

Source: FIBA

8 July 2023
13:30

Boxscore

Iceland	70–68	Slovenia
Scoring by quarter: 17–21, 19–14, 18–22, 16–11
Pts: Atlason 27; Rebs: Atlason 9 Asts: Atlason, Kjartansson 3		Pts: Klavžar 18; Rebs: Ciani, Urbiha 7 Asts: Klavžar 7

Heraklion Arena "Dyo Aorakia"
Referees: Aleksandar Glišić (SRB), Beniamino Attard (ITA), Chess van Looy (BEL)

8 July 2023
16:00

Boxscore

France	80–63	Germany
Scoring by quarter: 22–17, 24–14, 24–12, 10–20
Pts: Raynaud 15; Rebs: Traoré 9 Asts: Bal, Doumbia 4		Pts: Rataj 17; Rebs: Onyejiaka 7 Asts: Rataj 4

Heraklion Arena "Dyo Aorakia"
Referees: Manuel Mazzoni (ITA), Radomir Vojnović (MNE), Mehmet Şahin (TUR)

9 July 2023
13:30

Boxscore

Germany	83–81	Iceland
Scoring by quarter: 20–20, 23–21, 24–24, 16–16
Pts: Schröder 21; Rebs: Fru 7 Asts: Ensminger 6		Pts: Kjartansson, Þrastarson 21; Rebs: Atlason 7 Asts: Kjartansson 7

Heraklion University Hall
Referees: Aleksandar Glišić (SRB), Chess van Looy (BEL), Pavel Fuska (SVK)

9 July 2023
18:30

Boxscore

Slovenia	61–81	France
Scoring by quarter: 22–18, 8–26, 21–21, 10–16
Pts: Ciani 14; Rebs: Ciani 8 Asts: Dolničar 4		Pts: Kamardine 20; Rebs: Mienandi 5 Asts: De Sousa, Leray 3

Heraklion University Hall
Referees: Ademir Zurapović (BIH), Can Mavisu (TUR), Mehmet Şahin (TUR)

10 July 2023
13:30

Boxscore

Germany	64–58	Slovenia
Scoring by quarter: 19–17, 19–11, 14–12, 12–18
Pts: Rataj 14; Rebs: Fru 9 Asts: Lademacher, Onyejiaka 3		Pts: Klavžar 12; Rebs: Urbiha 8 Asts: Klavžar 2

Heraklion Arena "Dyo Aorakia"
Referees: Aleksandar Glišić (SRB), Can Mavisu (TUR), Alin Faur (ROM)

10 July 2023
18:30

Boxscore

Iceland	45–110	France
Scoring by quarter: 11–20, 6–35, 13–23, 15–32
Pts: Ingólfsson 11; Rebs: three players 3 Asts: Bárðarson 4		Pts: Bal 19; Rebs: Mienandi 8 Asts: De Sousa 6

Heraklion University Hall
Referees: Ademir Zurapović (BIH), Alberto Sánchez Sixto (ESP), Domen Krajnc (SVN)

== Playoff brackets ==
=== Main bracket ===
Round of 16
12 July
Turkey	73
Montenegro	68
12 July
Greece	83
Iceland	75
12 July
Serbia	75
Italy	72
12 July
France	89
Poland	55
12 July
Belgium	80
Estonia	65
12 July
Lithuania	70
Slovenia	51
12 July
Spain	52
Israel	59
12 July
Germany	87
Croatia	67

Quarterfinals
13 July
Turkey	61
Greece	87
13 July
Serbia	73
France	82
13 July
Belgium	77
Lithuania	71
13 July
Israel	75
Germany	64

Semifinals
15 July
Greece	51
France	98
15 July
Belgium	46
Israel	67

Final
16 July
France (OT)	89
Israel	79
3rd place match
16 July
Greece (OT)	68
Belgium	64

=== 5th place bracket ===
5th–8th place semifinals
15 July
Turkey	55
Serbia	76
15 July
Lithuania	58
Germany	60

5th place match
16 July
Serbia	82
Germany	78
7th place match
16 July
Turkey	70
Lithuania	66

=== 9th place bracket ===
9th–16th place quarterfinals
13 July
Montenegro	73
Iceland	99
13 July
Italy	72
Poland	60
13 July
Estonia	62
Slovenia	83
13 July
Spain	84
Croatia	60

9th–12th place semifinals
15 July
Iceland	86
Italy	98
15 July
Slovenia	72
Spain	75

9th place match
16 July
Italy	75
Spain	69
11th place match
16 July
Iceland	75
Slovenia	90

=== 13th place bracket ===
13th–16th place semifinals
15 July
Montenegro	64
Poland	61
15 July
Estonia	70
Croatia	98

13th place match
16 July
Montenegro	81
Croatia	78
15th place match
16 July
Poland	71
Estonia	62

== Playoff results ==
=== Round of 16 ===
12 July 2023
13:30

Boxscore

Lithuania	70–51	Slovenia
Scoring by quarter: 22–16, 17–12, 17–16, 14–7
Pts: Lelevičius, Krivas 14; Rebs: Krivas 15; Asts: Krivas 4		Pts: Ciani 14; Rebs: Ciani 8 Asts: Klavžar 4

Heraklion Arena "Dyo Aorakia"
Referees: Ademir Zurapović (BIH), Alberto Sánchez Sixto (ESP), Łukasz Jankowski (POL)

12 July 2023
13:30

Boxscore

Germany	87–67	Croatia
Scoring by quarter: 14–15, 27–21, 23–13, 23–18
Pts: Fru 20; Rebs: Schröder 8 Asts: Ensminger 8		Pts: Z. Ivišić 14; Rebs: Kalajžić 6 Asts: Rajaofera 4

Heraklion University Hall
Referees: Gvidas Gedvilas (LTU), Mehmet Şahin (TUR), Stylianos Simeonidis (GRE)

12 July 2023
16:00

Boxscore

Belgium	80–65	Estonia
Scoring by quarter: 20–15, 18–22, 25–16, 17–12
Pts: De Ridder 30; Rebs: De Ridder 12; Asts: Mennes 5		Pts: Poom 14; Rebs: Poom 5 Asts: Kuusmaa 3

Heraklion Arena "Dyo Aorakia"
Referees: Radomir Vojnović (MNE), Beniamino Attard (ITA), Patrick Müller (DEU)

12 July 2023
16:00

Boxscore

Spain	52–59	Israel
Scoring by quarter: 16–17, 16–17, 13–8, 7–17
Pts: Domínguez 10; Rebs: Tamba 7 Asts: Núñez 4		Pts: Wolf 21; Rebs: Wolf 13; Asts: Yaacov 7

Heraklion University Hall
Referees: Manuel Mazzoni (ITA), Can Mavisu (TUR), Alexandre Maret (FRA)

12 July 2023
18:30

Boxscore

Serbia	75–72	Italy
Scoring by quarter: 16–15, 21–14, 22–25, 16–18
Pts: Šaranović 20; Rebs: Šaranović 7 Asts: Petrović 7		Pts: Vincini 18; Rebs: Virginio 6 Asts: Casarin 7

Heraklion University Hall
Referees: Martins Kozlovskis (LAT), Péter Praksch (HUN), Davíð Tómasson (ISL)

12 July 2023
18:30

Boxscore

Greece	83–75	Iceland
Scoring by quarter: 24–24, 17–21, 24–11, 18–19
Pts: Oikonomopoulos 18; Rebs: Zougris 12; Asts: Bazinas 5		Pts: Gunnarsson 21; Rebs: Þrastarson 6 Asts: Þrastarson 4

Heraklion Arena "Dyo Aorakia"
Referees: Aleksandar Glišić (SRB), Marius Ciulin (ROM), Mihkel Männiste (EST)

12 July 2023
21:00

Boxscore

Turkey	73–68	Montenegro
Scoring by quarter: 18–17, 22–11, 9–16, 24–24
Pts: Büyüktuncel 16; Rebs: Yiğitoğlu 12; Asts: Özçelik 7		Pts: Žugić 24; Rebs: Jovanović 7 Asts: Žugić 4

Heraklion Arena "Dyo Aorakia"
Referees: Gintaras Vitkauskas (LTU), Alin Faur (ROM), Chess van Looy (BEL)

12 July 2023
21:00

Boxscore

France	89–55	Poland
Scoring by quarter: 30–11, 16–8, 18–21, 25–15
Pts: Bolanga 13; Rebs: Raynaud 6 Asts: Leray 7		Pts: Piśla 11; Rebs: Wińkowski 4 Asts: Wiśniewski 5

Heraklion University Hall
Referees: Martin Vulić (CRO), Pavel Fuska (SVK), Domen Krajnc (SVN)

=== 9th–16th place quarterfinals ===
13 July 2023
13:30

Boxscore

Estonia	62–83	Slovenia
Scoring by quarter: 19–22, 9–18, 21–26, 13–17
Pts: Tassa 17; Rebs: Poom 8 Asts: Poom 4		Pts: Klavžar 21; Rebs: Ciani 8 Asts: Mirtič 7

Heraklion University Hall
Referees: Radomir Vojnović (MNE), Péter Praksch (HUN), Stylianos Simeonidis (GRE)

13 July 2023
16:00

Boxscore

Spain	84–60	Croatia
Scoring by quarter: 21–17, 17–15, 23–4, 23–24
Pts: Caicedo 18; Rebs: Paz 8 Asts: Naspler 5		Pts: Matić 13; Rebs: T. Ivišić, Škorić 6 Asts: Rajaofera 5

Heraklion University Hall
Referees: Beniamino Attard (ITA), Alin Faur (ROM), Davíð Tómasson (ISL)

13 July 2023
18:30

Boxscore

Montenegro	73–99	Iceland
Scoring by quarter: 16–18, 23-24, 16-37, 18–20
Pts: Jovanović 26; Rebs: Vukčević 7 Asts: Bogavac 5		Pts: Gunnarsson 30; Rebs: Gunnarsson 10; Asts: Gunnarsson, Þrastarson 5

Heraklion University Hall
Referees: Martin Vulić (CRO), Mihkel Männiste (EST), Pavel Fuska (SVK)

13 July 2023
21:00

Boxscore

Italy	72–60	Poland
Scoring by quarter: 15–22, 27–5, 12–18, 18–15
Pts: Giordano 11; Rebs: Casarin 11; Asts: Casarin, Loro 3		Pts: Wilczek 14; Rebs: Urbaniak 12; Asts: Wiśniewski 5

Heraklion University Hall
Referees: Marius Ciulin (ROM), Chess van Looy (BEL), Patrick Müller (DEU)

=== 13th–16th place semifinals ===
15 July 2023
13:30

Boxscore

Montenegro	64–61	Poland
Scoring by quarter: 11–7, 14–19, 17–17, 22–18
Pts: Mirković 15; Rebs: Vukčević 6 Asts: Ivanović 4		Pts: Urbaniak 17; Rebs: Wińkowski 14; Asts: Wiśniewski 4

Heraklion University Hall
Referees: Martins Kozlovskis (LAT), Alexandre Maret (FRA), Stylianos Simeonidis (GRE)

15 July 2023
16:00

Boxscore

Estonia	70–98	Croatia
Scoring by quarter: 11–28, 16–24, 16–23, 27–23
Pts: Allik, Poom 14; Rebs: Kuuba, Poom 7 Asts: Malm, Välb 5		Pts: Brala 25; Rebs: T. Ivišić 8 Asts: Kos 5

Heraklion University Hall
Referees: Gvidas Gedvilas (LTU), Péter Praksch (HUN), Can Mavisu (TUR)

=== 15th place match ===
16 July 2023
11:00

Boxscore

Poland	71–62	Estonia
Scoring by quarter: 11-19, 15-18, 27-14, 18-11
Pts: Urbaniak 19; Rebs: Urbaniak 15; Asts: Wiśniewski 6		Pts: Poom 21; Rebs: Poom 7 Asts: Välb 4

Heraklion University Hall
Referees: Marius Ciulin (ROM), Stylianos Simeonidis (GRE), Patrick Müller (DEU)

=== 13th place match ===
16 July 2023
16:00

Boxscore

Montenegro	81–78	Croatia
Scoring by quarter: 17–22, 22–18, 21–19, 21–19
Pts: Jovanović 20; Rebs: Mirković 11; Asts: Ivanović 5		Pts: Brala 23; Rebs: Brala 10; Asts: Rajaofera 5

Heraklion Arena "Dyo Aorakia"
Referees: Manuel Mazzoni (ITA), Mehmet Şahin (TUR), Beniamino Attard (ITA)

=== 9th–12th place semifinals ===
15 July 2023
18:30

Boxscore

Iceland	86–98	Italy
Scoring by quarter: 22–25, 28-25, 15-33, 21-15
Pts: Atlason, Gunnarsson 27; Rebs: Atlason 7 Asts: Atlason 7		Pts: Fantoma 22; Rebs: Casarin 10; Asts: Casarin 6

Heraklion University Hall
Referees: Ademir Zurapović (BIH), Gintaras Vitkauskas (LTU), Alin Faur (ROM)

15 July 2023
21:00

Boxscore

Slovenia	72–75 (OT)	Spain
Scoring by quarter: 19–14, 12–13, 17–22, 15–14, Overtime: 9–12
Pts: Klavžar 18; Rebs: Ciani 14; Asts: Klavžar 6		Pts: Tamba 17; Rebs: four players 5 Asts: Núñez 5

Heraklion University Hall
Referees: Aleksandar Glišić (SRB), Chess van Looy (BEL), Patrick Müller (DEU)

=== 11th place match ===
16 July 2023
13:30

Boxscore

Iceland	75–90	Slovenia
Scoring by quarter: 17–27, 22–23, 17–19, 19–21
Pts: Þrastarson 25; Rebs: Þrastarson 6 Asts: Atlason 4		Pts: Samar 18; Rebs: Ciani 8 Asts: Urbiha 6

Heraklion University Hall
Referees: Martin Vulić (CRO), Alin Faur (ROM), Chess van Looy (BEL)

=== 9th place match ===
16 July 2023
16:00

Boxscore

Italy	75–69	Spain
Scoring by quarter: 13–10, 24–6, 21–29, 17–24
Pts: Casarin 15; Rebs: Casarin 6 Asts: Berdini, Faggian 4		Pts: Núñez 19; Rebs: Aquino 5 Asts: Núñez 8

Heraklion University Hall
Referees: Radomir Vojnović (MNE), Can Mavisu (TUR), Domen Krajnc (SVN)

=== Championship quarterfinals ===
13 July 2023
13:30

Boxscore

Israel	75–64	Germany
Scoring by quarter: 15–16, 16–9, 25–16, 19–23
Pts: Zipper 23; Rebs: Wolf 11; Asts: Yaacov 10		Pts: Schröder 15; Rebs: Fru 12; Asts: Ensminger 5

Heraklion Arena "Dyo Aorakia"
Referees: Aleksandar Glišić (SRB), Can Mavisu (TUR), Łukasz Jankowski (POL)

13 July 2023
16:00

Boxscore

Belgium	77–71	Lithuania
Scoring by quarter: 21–24, 12–26, 20–9, 24–12
Pts: De Ridder 16; Rebs: Bilolo 6 Asts: Pouedet 8		Pts: Lelevičius 21; Rebs: Krivas 13; Asts: Kublickas 3

Heraklion Arena "Dyo Aorakia"
Referees: Manuel Mazzoni (ITA), Mehmet Şahin (TUR), Alexandre Maret (FRA)

13 July 2023
18:30

Boxscore

Serbia	73–82	France
Scoring by quarter: 19–19, 22–18, 14–21, 18–24
Pts: Šaranović 20; Rebs: three players 5 Asts: Petrović 8		Pts: Bal 18; Rebs: Raynaud, Traoré 7 Asts: Kamardine, Leray 6

Heraklion Arena "Dyo Aorakia"
Referees: Martins Kozlovskis (LAT), Gintaras Vitkauskas (LTU), Domen Krajnc (SVN)

13 July 2023
21:00

Boxscore

Turkey	61–87	Greece
Scoring by quarter: 22–14, 15–29, 10–20, 14–24
Pts: Kuntker 15; Rebs: Konan 6 Asts: Büyüktuncel, Efeoğlu 3		Pts: Mantzoukas 25; Rebs: Zougris 10; Asts: Bazinas 8

Heraklion Arena "Dyo Aorakia"
Referees: Ademir Zurapović (BIH), Gvidas Gedvilas (LTU), Alberto Sánchez Sixto (ESP)

=== 5th–8th place semifinals ===
15 July 2023
13:30

Boxscore

Turkey	55–76	Serbia
Scoring by quarter: 12–23, 17–20, 14–7, 12–26
Pts: Büyüktuncel 14; Rebs: Büyüktuncel 6 Asts: five players 2		Pts: Šaranović 16; Rebs: Petrović 7 Asts: Matić 6

Heraklion Arena "Dyo Aorakia"
Referees: Mihkel Männiste (EST), Alberto Sánchez Sixto (ESP), Davíð Tómasson (ISL)

15 July 2023
16:00

Boxscore

Lithuania	58–60	Germany
Scoring by quarter: 14–16, 9–17, 15–11, 20–16
Pts: Lelevičius 19; Rebs: Butka 10; Asts: Bartninkas, Butka 3		Pts: Rataj 11; Rebs: Ensminger 8 Asts: Ensminger 5

Heraklion Arena "Dyo Aorakia"
Referees: Radomir Vojnović (MNE), Pavel Fuska (SVK), Domen Krajnc (SVN)

=== 7th place match ===
16 July 2023
18:30

Boxscore

Turkey	70–66	Lithuania
Scoring by quarter: 24–18, 8–21, 19–9, 19–18
Pts: Yiğitoğlu 33; Rebs: Yiğitoğlu 13; Asts: Yıldızoğlu 12		Pts: Krivas, Lelevičius 15; Rebs: Krivas 11; Asts: Sargiūnas 6

Heraklion University Hall
Referees: Marius Ciulin (ROM), Martin Vulić (CRO), Łukasz Jankowski (POL)

=== 5th place match ===
16 July 2023
13:30

Boxscore

Serbia	82–78	Germany
Scoring by quarter: 21–14, 13–27, 29–20, 19–17
Pts: Šaranović 26; Rebs: Belić 9 Asts: Petrović 5		Pts: Rataj 24; Rebs: Ensminger 8 Asts: Ensminger 6

Heraklion Arena "Dyo Aorakia"
Referees: Gintaras Vitkauskas (LTU), Alberto Sánchez Sixto (ESP), Davíð Tómasson (ISL)

=== Championship semifinals ===
15 July 2023
18:30

Boxscore

Belgium	46–67	Israel
Scoring by quarter: 14–19, 11–12, 8–23, 13–13

Heraklion Arena "Dyo Aorakia"

15 July 2023
21:00

Boxscore

Greece	51–98	France
Scoring by quarter: 14–25, 9–26, 16–15, 12–32

Heraklion Arena "Dyo Aorakia"

=== 3rd place match ===
16 July 2023
18:30

Boxscore

Greece	68–64 (OT)	Belgium
Scoring by quarter: 18–17, 15–26, 7–9, 16–4, Overtime: 12–8

Heraklion Arena "Dyo Aorakia"

=== Final ===
16 July 2023
21:00

Boxscore

France	89–79 (OT)	Israel
Scoring by quarter: 17–26, 30–18, 14–13, 11–15, Overtime: 17–7

Heraklion Arena "Dyo Aorakia"

== Final standings ==
Rank	Team	Record
1st place, gold medalist(s)	France	7–0
2nd place, silver medalist(s)	Israel	4–3
3rd place, bronze medalist(s)	Greece	5–2
4	Belgium	4–3
5	Serbia	5–2
6	Germany	4–3
7	Turkey	4–3
8	Lithuania	4–3
9	Italy	4–3
10	Spain	5–2
11	Slovenia	2–5
12	Iceland	2–5
13	Montenegro	2–5
14	Croatia	2–5
15	Poland	1–6
16	Estonia	1–6

Relegated to the 2024 FIBA U20 EuroBasket Division B

== Awards ==
Most Valuable Player
(France) Ilias Kamardine

=== All-Tournament Team ===
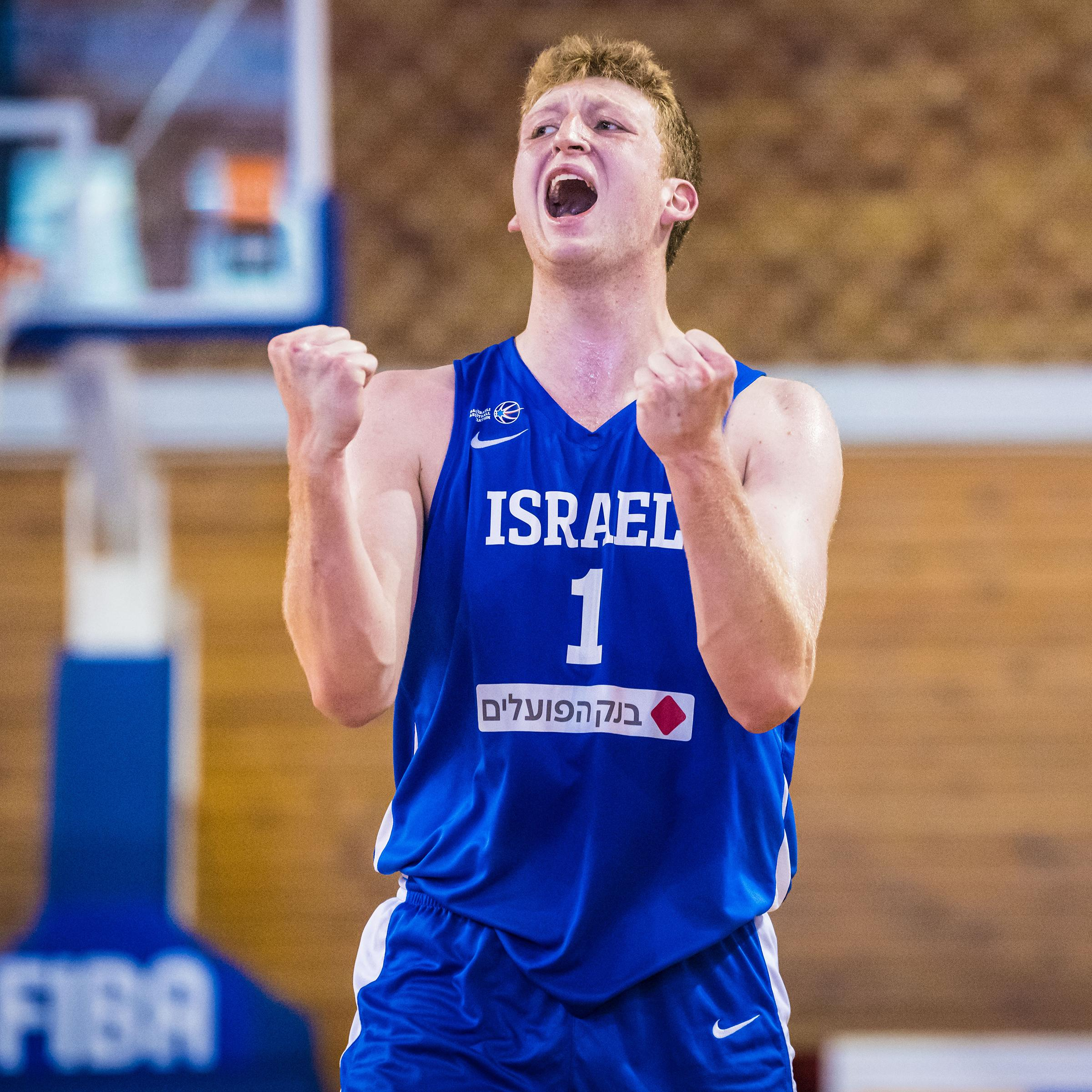
Danny Wolf playing for the Israeli national under-20 basketball team in 2023

- (Israel) Noam Yaacov
- (France) Ilias Kamardine
- (Greece) Vangelis Zougris
- (Belgium) Thijs De Ridder
- (Israel) Daniel Wolf

== See also ==
- 2023 FIBA U20 European Championship Division B
