= FRU =

Fru or FRU may refer to:

== FRU ==
- Federal Reserve Unit, of the Royal Malaysian Police
- Field-replaceable unit
- Fiji Rugby Union
- Film Resource Unit, a defunct South African film distributor
- Fleet Radio Unit, of the United States Navy active during World War II
- Fleet Requirements Unit, Royal Navy
- Florida Rugby Union
- Force Research Unit, a covert military intelligence unit of the British Army in Northern Ireland
- Free Representation Unit, a British legal charity

== People ==
- Fru Hazlitt (born 1963), a British broadcasting executive
- John Fru Ndi (born 1941), Cameroonian politician
- Sananda Fru (born 2003), German basketballer

== Other ==
- Fru (video game), a 2016 video game
- Fruitless (gene), of Drosophila melanogaster
- Manas International Airport, in Bishkek, Kyrgyzstan, former IATA airport code FRU
