= 2024–25 Washington State Cougars men's basketball team =

American college basketball season

2024–25 Washington State Cougars men's basketball

College Basketball Crown, First Round
- Conference: West Coast Conference
- Record: 19–15 (8–10 WCC)
- Head coach: David Riley (1st season)
- Assistant coaches: Donald Brady; Jerry Brown; Blake Fernandez; George Galanopoulos
- Home arena: Beasley Coliseum

2024–25 West Coast Conference men's basketball standings
	Conf.				Overall
Team	W		L	PCT	W		L	PCT
No. 24 Saint Mary's	17	–	1	.944	29	–	6	.829
No. 23 Gonzaga †	14	–	4	.778	26	–	9	.743
San Francisco	13	–	5	.722	25	–	10	.714
Santa Clara	12	–	6	.667	21	–	13	.618
Oregon State	10	–	8	.556	20	–	13	.606
Washington State	8	–	10	.444	19	–	15	.559
Loyola Marymount	8	–	10	.444	17	–	15	.531
Portland	7	–	11	.389	12	–	20	.375
Pepperdine	4	–	14	.222	13	–	22	.371
Pacific	4	–	14	.222	9	–	24	.273
San Diego	2	–	16	.111	6	–	27	.182
† 2025 WCC tournament winner Rankings from AP poll

The 2024–25 Washington State Cougars men's basketball team represented Washington State University during the 2024–25 NCAA Division I men's basketball season. The team, led by first-year head coach David Riley, played their home games at the Beasley Coliseum in Pullman, Washington as first-year associate members in the West Coast Conference.

== Previous season ==
The Cougars finished the 2023–24 season 25–10, 14–6 in Pac-12 play to finish in second place. They defeated Stanford in the quarterfinals of the Pac-12 tournament before losing to Colorado in the semifinals. They received an at-large bid to the NCAA tournament as the No. 7 seed in the East region. There, they beat Drake in the first round before losing to Iowa State in the second round.

This was the final season of the Pac-12 conference, as it dissolved after the majority of Pac-12 schools left the conference to join other conferences. The Cougars would play in the West Coast Conference as an affiliate member for the next two years.

On February 19, 2024, the Cougars returned to the AP Poll for the first time since the 2007–08 season.

== Offseason ==
=== Departures ===
Name	Number	Pos.	Height	Weight	Year	Hometown	Reason for departure
Jaylen Wells	0	F	6'8"	205	Junior	Sacramento, CA	Declared for 2024 NBA draft; selected 39th overall by Memphis Grizzlies
Myles Rice	2	G	6'3"	180	(redshirt) Freshman	Columbia, SC	Transferred to Indiana
Jabe Mullins	3	G	6'6"	200	Senior	Snoqualmie, WA	Transferred to Montana State
Shae Korpela	4	G	6'7"	195	(redshirt) Freshman	Aspen, CO	Walk-on; not on team roster
Ben Olesen	5	G	6'0"	160	(redshirt) Senior	Mill Creek, WA	Walk-on; graduated
Joseph Yesufu	11	G	6'0"	185	Senior	Bolingbrook, IL	Transferred to West Virginia
Isaac Jones	13	C	6'9"	245	(redshirt) Senior	Spanaway, WA	Graduated/undrafted in 2024 NBA draft; signed with the Sacramento Kings
Braden Korpela	14	G	6'7"	170	(redshirt) Freshman	Aspen, CO	Walk-on; not on team roster
AJ Rohosy	15	F	6'9"	215	(redshirt) Sophomore	San Anselmo, CA	Walk-on; transferred
Rueben Chinyelu	20	C	6'11"	245	Freshman	Enugu Agidi, Nigeria	Transferred to Florida
Dylan Darling	22	G	6'2"	180	Sophomore	Spokane, WA	Transferred to Idaho State
Andrej Jakimovski	23	F	6'8"	220	Senior	Skopje, Macedonia	Transferred to Colorado
Kymany Houinsou	31	G	6'6"	205	Sophomore	Mulhouse, France	Transferred to Loyola Chicago
AJ LaBeau	34	F	6'10"	230	Freshman	Boise, ID	Walk-on; transferred to Cornell
Oscar Cluff	45	F	6'11"	255	Junior	Sunshine Coast, Australia	Transferred to South Dakota State

=== Incoming transfers ===
Name	Num	Pos.	Height	Weight	Year	Hometown	Previous school
Cedric Coward	0	F	6'6"	206	Senior	Fresno, CA	Eastern Washington
Ethan Price	3	F	6'10"	230	Senior	Bury St Edmunds, England	Eastern Washington
LeJuan Watts	4	F	6'6"	233	(redshirt) Sophomore	Fresno, CA	Eastern Washington
Nate Calmese	8	G	6'2"	164	Junior	Gilbert, AZ	Washington
Rihards Vavers	15	F	6'7"	195	Sophomore	Ādaži, Latvia	Quinnipiac
ND Okafor	22	F	6'9"	235	Junior	Dundalk, Ireland	California
Dane Erikstrup	32	F	6'11"	226	Senior	Beaverton, OR	Eastern Washington

=== 2024 recruiting class ===
College recruiting
Name	Hometown	School	Height	Weight	Commit date
Marcus Wilson; SG	Scottsdale, AZ	Bella Vista Prep	6 ft 2 in (1.88 m)	170 lb (77 kg)	May 16, 2023
Marcus Wilson; SG	Recruit ratings: 247Sports:				
Kase Wynott; PG	Lapwai, ID	Lapwai High School	6 ft 6 in (1.98 m)	190 lb (86 kg)	Apr 1, 2024
Kase Wynott; PG	Recruit ratings: Rivals: 247Sports: ESPN: (0)				
Tómas Þrastarson; SG	Iceland	N/A	6 ft 6 in (1.98 m)	N/A	May 21, 2024
Tómas Þrastarson; SG	Recruit ratings: Rivals: 247Sports: ESPN: (0)				
Dimitrije Vukicevic; C	Austria	N/A	7 ft 0 in (2.13 m)	N/A	Jul 1, 2024
Dimitrije Vukicevic; C	Recruit ratings: Rivals: 247Sports: ESPN: (0)				
Overall recruit ranking:
Note: In many cases, Scout, Rivals, 247Sports, On3, and ESPN may conflict in their listings of height and weight.; In these cases, the average was taken. ESPN grades are on a 100-point scale.; Sources: "2024 Washington State Commits". Rivals.; "Men's Basketball Recruiting". Scout.; "ESPN- Washington State Cougars Men's Basketball Recruiting". ESPN.; "Scout.com Team Recruiting Rankings". Scout.; "2024 Team Ranking". Rivals.

== Roster ==
2024–25 Washington State Cougars men's basketball team
Players
Coaches

Pos.	#	Name	Height	Weight	Year	Previous school	Hometown
F	0	Cedric Coward	6 ft 6 in (1.98 m)	206 lb (93 kg)	Sr	Eastern Washington	Fresno, CA
G	2	Marcus Wilson	6 ft 3 in (1.91 m)	180 lb (82 kg)	Fr	Bella Vista	Albuquerque, NM
F	3	Ethan Price	6 ft 10 in (2.08 m)	230 lb (104 kg)	Sr	Eastern Washington	Bury St Edmunds, England
F	4	LeJuan Watts	6 ft 6 in (1.98 m)	233 lb (106 kg)	RS So	Eastern Washington	Fresno, CA
G	5	Tómas Valur Þrastarson	6 ft 6 in (1.98 m)	—	Fr	Þór Þorlákshöfn (ISL)	Þorlákshöfn, Iceland
G	8	Nate Calmese	6 ft 2 in (1.88 m)	164 lb (74 kg)	Jr	Washington	Gilbert, AZ
G	10	Parker Gerrits	6 ft 1 in (1.85 m)	190 lb (86 kg)	RS Fr	Olympia HS	Olympia, WA
G	12	Isaiah Watts	6 ft 3 in (1.91 m)	170 lb (77 kg)	So	South Kent (CT)	West Seattle, WA
F	15	Rihards Vavers	6 ft 7 in (2.01 m)	195 lb (88 kg)	So	Quinnpiac	Ādaži, Latvia
F	22	ND Okafor	6 ft 9 in (2.06 m)	235 lb (107 kg)	Jr	California	Dundalk, Ireland
F	32	Dane Erikstrup	6 ft 11 in (2.11 m)	226 lb (103 kg)	Sr	Eastern Washington	Beaverton, OR
C	33	Dimitrije Vukicevic	7 ft 0 in (2.13 m)	—	Fr	SKN St. Pölten (Austria)	Serbia
G	51	Kase Wynott	6 ft 6 in (1.98 m)	190 lb (86 kg)	Fr	Lapwai HS	Winchester, ID

Head coach

- David Riley (Whitworth)

Assistant coach(es)

- Donald Brady (Redlands)
- Jerry Brown (Fresno State)
- Blake Fernandez (Western Washington)
- Pedro Garcia Rosado (Open)
- George Galanopoulos (basketball coach) (Indiana)

Legend

- (C) Team captain
- (S) Suspended
- (I) Ineligible
- (W) Walk-on
- Injured
- Current redshirt

Roster

== Schedule and results ==
Date time, TV	Rank^{#}	Opponent^{#}	Result	Record	High points	High rebounds	High assists	Site (attendance) city, state
Non-conference regular season
November 4, 2024*; 8:00 p.m., ESPN+		Portland State	W 100–92	1–0	23 – Coward	12 – Coward	5 – Calmese	Beasley Coliseum (3,120); Pullman, WA
November 8, 2024*; 8:00 p.m., ESPN+		Bradley	W 91–74	2–0	18 – Coward	11 – L. Watts	6 – Calmese	Beasley Coliseum (3,982); Pullman, WA
November 11, 2024*; 6:30 p.m., ESPN+		Idaho; Battle of the Palouse	W 90–67	3–0	18 – Calmese	14 – L. Watts	3 – Calmese	Beasley Coliseum (3,838); Pullman, WA
November 15, 2024*; 5:30 p.m., BTN		vs. Iowa; Quad Cities Hoops Showdown	L 66–76	3–1	27 – Calmese	10 – L. Watts	4 – L. Watts	Vibrant Arena at The MARK (8,488); Moline, IL
November 18, 2024*; 6:30 p.m., ESPN+		Northern Colorado; Acrisure Holiday Invitational campus game	W 83–69	4–1	30 – Coward	8 – L. Watts	5 – L. Watts	Beasley Coliseum (3,066); Pullman, WA
November 21, 2024*; 6:30 p.m., SWX		vs. Eastern Washington	W 96–81	5–1	24 – Erikstrup	9 – Coward	7 – Coward	Spokane Arena (3,854); Spokane, WA
November 26, 2024*; 6:00 p.m., TruTV		vs. Fresno State; Acrisure Holiday Invitational semifinal	W 84–73	6–1	22 – Calmese	9 – L. Watts	6 – Tied	Acrisure Arena (550); Thousand Palms, CA
November 27, 2024*; 6:30 p.m., TruTV		vs. SMU; Acrisure Holiday Invitational final	L 60–77	6–2	15 – Calmese	5 – I. Watts	6 – Calmese	Acrisure Arena; Thousand Palms, CA
December 2, 2024*; 7:00 p.m., MW Network		at Nevada	W 68–57	7–2	17 – I. Watts	9 – L. Watts	7 – Calmese	Lawlor Events Center (7,748); Reno, NV
December 7, 2024*; 1:00 p.m., CBS		vs. Boise State	W 74–69	8–2	20 – L. Watts	11 – L. Watts	6 – L. Watts	Idaho Central Arena (4,570); Boise, ID
December 14, 2024*; 2:00 p.m., ESPN+		Missouri State	W 91–78	9–2	20 – Tied	7 – Tied	7 – Calmese	Beasley Coliseum (3,304); Pullman, WA
December 18, 2024*; 8:00 p.m., FS1		at Washington; Rivalry	L 73–89	9–3	21 – Calmese	8 – L. Watts	4 – Price	Alaska Airlines Arena (7,880); Seattle, WA
December 21, 2024*; 1:00 p.m., ESPN+		vs. Northern Iowa; Holiday Hoops Classic	W 76–68	10–3	16 – Calmese	12 – L. Watts	6 – Calmese	Orleans Arena; Paradise, NV
WCC regular season
December 28, 2024; 5:00 p.m., ESPN+		at Portland	W 89–73	11–3 (1–0)	22 – Price	8 – L. Watts	5 – Tied	Chiles Center (2,228); Portland, OR
December 30, 2024; 6:30 p.m., ESPN+		Loyola Marymount	W 73–59	12–3 (2–0)	20 – Calmese	11 – L. Watts	8 – L. Watts	Spokane Arena (3,449); Spokane, WA
January 4, 2025; 4:00 p.m., ESPN+		San Francisco	W 91–82	13–3 (3–0)	24 – L. Watts	12 – L. Watts	5 – L. Watts	Beasley Coliseum (3,823); Pullman, WA
January 9, 2025; 6:30 p.m., ESPN+		Pacific	L 94–95 ^{OT}	13–4 (3–1)	28 – Price	8 – Tied	5 – Calmese	Beasley Coliseum (3,715); Pullman, WA
January 11, 2025; 6:00 p.m., ESPN+		at No. 18 Gonzaga; Rivalry	L 75–88	13–5 (3–2)	20 – Calmese	7 – Erikstrup	8 – Calmese	McCarthey Athletic Center (6,000); Spokane, WA
January 16, 2025; 7:00 p.m., ESPN+		at San Diego	W 65–61	14–5 (4–2)	27 – Calmese	10 – Erikstrup	5 – L. Watts	Jenny Craig Pavilion (1,337); San Diego, CA
January 18, 2025; 3:00 p.m., ESPN+		Portland	W 92–70	15–5 (5–2)	23 – Calmese	7 – Tied	8 – Calmese	Beasley Coliseum (3,594); Pullman, WA
January 23, 2025; 8:00 p.m., CBSSN		at Santa Clara	L 65–93	15–6 (5–3)	20 – L. Watts	11 – L. Watts	10 – L. Watts	Leavey Center (1,875); Santa Clara, CA
January 25, 2025; 5:00 p.m., CBSSN		Saint Mary's	L 75–80	15–7 (5–4)	20 – Price	4 – Thrastarson	6 – L. Watts	Beasley Coliseum (4,240); Pullman, WA
January 30, 2025; 7:00 p.m., ESPN+		at Pacific	L 68–70	15–8 (5–5)	17 – Erikstrup	8 – Price	5 – Price	Alex G. Spanos Center (1,437); Stockton, CA
February 1, 2025; 7:00 p.m., ESPN+		at San Francisco	L 51–75	15–9 (5–6)	12 – Tied	6 – L. Watts	4 – I. Watts	Sobrato Center (3,200); San Francisco, CA
February 6, 2025; 8:00 p.m., ESPN2		at Oregon State	L 72–84	15–10 (5–7)	25 – Calmese	4 – Price	4 – L. Watts	Gill Coliseum (4,909); Corvallis, OR
February 8, 2025; 3:00 p.m., ESPN+		Pepperdine	W 87–86	16–10 (6–7)	16 – Calmese	8 – Erikstrup	6 – L. Watts	Beasley Coliseum (3,957); Pullman, WA
February 15, 2025; 7:00 p.m., ESPN2		at Saint Mary's	L 56–77	16–11 (6–8)	17 – L. Watts	6 – I. Watts	4 – Tied	University Credit Union Pavilion (3,500); Moraga, CA
February 19, 2025; 6:00 p.m., ESPN2		Gonzaga; Rivalry	L 63–84	16–12 (6–9)	19 – L. Watts	4 – Price	5 – L. Watts	Beasley Coliseum (10,219); Pullman, WA
February 22, 2025; 3:00 p.m., CBSSN		Santa Clara	L 79–109	16–13 (6–10)	20 – Calmese	4 – Erikstrup	4 – Calmese	Beasley Coliseum (4,380); Pullman, WA
February 27, 2025; 6:30 p.m., ESPN+		San Diego	W 93–86	17–13 (7–10)	23 – Erikstrup	10 – L. Watts	5 – L. Watts	Beasley Coliseum (3,233); Pullman, WA
March 1, 2025; 7:00 p.m., ESPN+		at Pepperdine	W 90–81	18–13 (8–10)	15 – Tied	12 – Erikstrup	9 – L. Watts	Firestone Fieldhouse (808); Malibu, CA
WCC Tournament
March 8, 2025; 8:30 PM, ESPN+	(6)	vs. (7) Loyola Marymount; Third round	W 94–77	19–13	22 – Tied	13 – L. Watts	7 – Calmese	Orleans Arena (3,048); Paradise, NV
March 9, 2025; 8:00 PM, ESPN2	(6)	vs. (3) San Francisco; Quarterfinal	L 75–86	19–14	26 – Price	6 – Price	11 – Calmese	Orleans Arena (2,523); Paradise, NV
College Basketball Crown
March 31, 2025*; 8:10 p.m., FS1		vs. Georgetown; First round	L 82–85	19–15	22 – Watts	8 – Watts	5 – Watts	MGM Grand Garden Arena (2,947); Paradise, NV
*Non-conference game. ^{#}Rankings from AP Poll. (#) Tournament seedings in parentheses. All times are in Pacific Time.
