= Reou-Takh =

- Directed by: Mahama Johnson Traoré
- Release date: 1972
- Running time: 45 minutes
- Country: Senegal

Reou-Takh (Big City) is a 1972 film directed by Senegalese director Mahama Johnson Traoré. The title refers to the name given to Dakar by rural Senegalese people. It was the first Senegalese film to be completely banned in its country.

== Synopsis ==
A young African-American man arrives in Dakar in search of a fantasized African continent. He is surprised to find a Westernized, depersonalized country.

== Plot ==
An Air Afrique plane lands in Dakar airport, and among the passengers is John, an African-American man. During an interview, he is asked, “Do you think you will find in Senegal what you were looking for in Africa?”. He answers affirmatively then leaves the airport in a Renault 4 with someone else. The credits roll against a panoramic view of Dakar, followed by a neutral commentary on cityscapes, reminiscing about Dakar's bygone “golden days,” steeped in camaraderie and chivalry - the Senegal of “free, noble, and courageous men.” However, today, the anonymous crowds no longer have time to fraternize or humanize. According to the voice-over, John discerns no illusions of “trinkets fit for tourists” or mere folkloric spectacles; it's authenticity that beckons him to Africa. He encounters the same strains of blues as back home. “When will these melodies embrace an 'Afro-African' essence?” he wonders. The voice-over, illustrated by images, evokes misery, hunger, sickness in the ghettos, in the slums that John discovers to the tune of blues. Is it inevitable? The youth become unemployed. The beggars are numerous. Upon seeing the mosques, John realizes that, despite everything, “man continues to devote to his creator a deep veneration close to mysticism. This fanaticism, combined with fatalism, renders it possible to endure suffering.”

John sets sail to Gorée where “millions of slaves” left to the new world. He meets a man who agrees to inform him that “it was on this shore that white slave traders and Negro kings met” to barter. John is shocked by the word, and the message is backed up by a historical re-enactment by the sea. He proceeds with his exploration, the melodic strains of the kora accompanying him, while children join his journey. Eventually, he arrives at the House of Slaves, where a guide provides him with a tour. A new historical reconstruction shows the harsh treatment of chained slaves. A slave-owner rapes a young woman. A group of slaves rebels, but is quickly subdued.

John continues his journey while the voice-over mentions that Gorée is also the birthplace of Blaise Diagne, who demanded self-determination. John gathers a couple of young people from Dakar and asks them about their occupation in his stammering French: one is a student and the other a teacher-poet. They discuss the inequality of social classes, for which political authorities, who reproduce colonial society, are responsible. According to the teacher, “the political power favors the preservation of foreign cultures”. As for the student, "the mentality of people must change" because they only appreciate what comes from the West and adopt its customs, even African-American ones. “If there are any exceptions, they exist among the supposedly elite youth,” adds the teacher. "The entire system must change,” concludes the student. Freedom must be preserved, adds the commentator in a panoramic view of the city, for “is the true purpose of mankind not mankind itself?"

== Cast ==
- Alain Christian Plennet as John
- N'DACK Gueye
- Meduna Faye
- Khady Fall
- Diobaye Dodo Diop

== Production ==
The film was directed by Mahama Traore. It is 44 minutes 25 seconds long, made on 16 mm film in colour, in the French language.

The film is a self-production with non-professional actors.

Other credits include: Spelling and contents according to the credits - note that the title is spelled without a hyphen while it is found in all the literature discussing the film:

- Cinematography: Baidy Sow, assisted by Papa Taphsir Thiam
- Sound: Jules Diagne
- Editing: Bernard Lefèvre
- Assistants: Cheikh Ngaïdo Ba, Lamine Diallo, Nioukhoussa Traoré, Abdoulaye Doumbia, Cheik Dieng Matar
- Script Contributor: Pathé Diagne
- Voice-over by Yves Diagne narrated by Emmanuel Gomes
- Production manager: Ousmane N'Diaye
- Production: Sunu Films Production, Dakar

== Release ==
The film was released in 1972. The film's incisive, critical tone led to the film being banned upon its release in Senegal in 1972. It was only screened at universities and festivals, in particular at the Cinémathèque québécoise in 1973, and as part of the retrospective Senegal: Fifteen Years of an African Cinema, 1962-1977 at the Museum of Modern Art on 26-27 February 1978.

== Reception ==
Reou-Takh translates into Wolof as "city of buildings".

The westernization of the elites and the impoverishment of the low-income neighborhoods are considered direct consequences of the triangular trade mentioned in Gorée, but also of the politicians' herd mentality. According to Jean and Ginette Delmas, Traoré expresses his disagreement during a debate when another film director suggests that, considering the risk of a ban in the country, it is necessary to produce a film with an international perspective. His top priority is the Senegalese public.

According to Paulin Soumanou Vieyra, the film was widely distributed abroad owing to its ban: the Senegalese Government "granted Johnson Traoré a wonderful gift: a completely normal film is now on demand everywhere. Naturally, people want to see the first Senegalese film to be completely banned in its country". The film was banned until changes were made, according to the demands of the authorities. What displeased the authorities was that the hero seems to have visited only the marginal districts of Dakar, and that he only has contact with opponents of the regime. However, Vieyra adds, "everything they say is true". The film skillfully blends documentary, fiction, and direct cinema, while the jazz, rumba, and blues music gives unity to the film's various scenes, and the dynamic camerawork and rhythmic editing support the narrative. However, Vieyra thought the film "too superficial in its approach to issues in Senegal" and that it lacked technical quality.

According to Traoré, "My protagonist finds that the notions of authenticity and tutti quanti are just for show, that they have no direct connection with real Black African culture". He adds that this film was the reason why he began to question the notion of an arthouse film: "I realized that we had to find not only a new language, but a new cinema ethic”. As for the fact that Africans in the film are accomplices of white slave traders, he replies: “the elites are often accomplices of foreign domination, which they help in its enterprise of depersonalization".

Traoré invited Moussa Touré to the movie set, who then worked as his lighting assistant, then lighting technician, then finally head lighting technician.

== See also ==
- Cinema of Senegal
