= Þrastarson =

Þrastarson is an Icelandic patronymic. Notable people with this name include:

- Haukur Þrastarson (born 2001), Icelandic handball player
- Styrmir Snær Þrastarson (born 2001), Icelandic basketball player
- Tómas Valur Þrastarson (born 2005), Icelandic basketball player
