= Serbia men's national under-20 basketball team =

Serbia
- FIBA zone: FIBA Europe
- National federation: Basketball Federation of Serbia
- Nickname: Orlići (The Eaglets)

U20 EuroBasket
- Appearances: 24
- Medals: Gold: 5 (1998, 2006, 2007, 2008, 2015; Silver: 1 (2026); Bronze: 3 (1996, 2005, 2014)

U20 EuroBasket Division B
- Appearances: 1
- Medals: Gold: 1 (2022)
Medal record
FIBA U20 European Championship
Representing FR Yugoslavia
Gold medal – first place	1998 Trapani
Bronze medal – third place	1996 Bursa & Istanbul
Representing Serbia and Montenegro
Gold medal – first place	2006 İzmir
Bronze medal – third place	2005 Chekhov
Representing Serbia
Gold medal – first place	2007 Nova Gorica/Gorizia
Gold medal – first place	2008 Riga
Gold medal – first place	2015 Lignano/Latisana
Silver medal – second place	2026 Ljubljana
Bronze medal – third place	2014 Crete

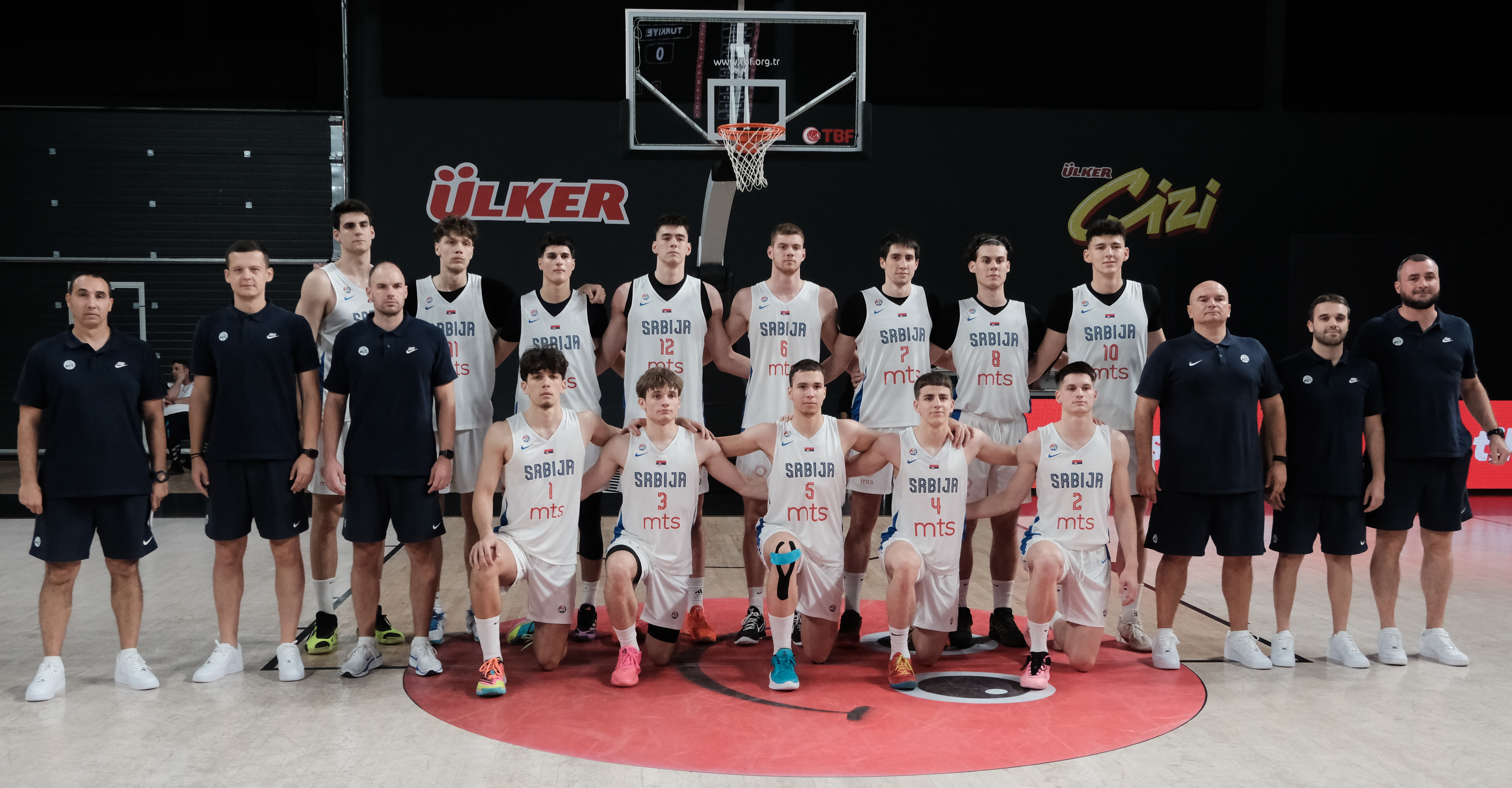
Serbia national U20 basketball team in 2026

The Serbia men's national under-20 basketball team (Serbian Cyrillic: Кошаркашка репрезентација Србије до 20 година) is the men's basketball team, administered by Basketball Federation of Serbia, that represents Serbia in international under-20 men's basketball competitions, consisting mainly of the FIBA U20 EuroBasket. The event was originally referred to as the European Championship for Men '22 and Under' and the 2000 European Championship for Young Men.

The national team competed as FR Yugoslavia up to 2002, and as Serbia and Montenegro from 2004 to 2006.

== FIBA U20 EuroBasket record ==
=== Representing FR Yugoslavia / Serbia and Montenegro ===
Year	Pos.	GP	W	L	Ref.
As (Federal Republic of Yugoslavia) FR Yugoslavia
(Greece) 1992	Suspended				
(Slovenia) 1994	Suspended				
(Turkey) 1996	Bronze medal	7	5	2	
(Italy) 1998	Gold medal	8	7	1	
(North Macedonia) 2000	5th	8	6	2	
(Lithuania) 2002	7th	8	5	3	
As Serbia and Montenegro
(Czech Republic) 2004	5th	8	6	2	
(Russia) 2005	Bronze medal	8	6	2	
(Turkey) 2006	Gold medal	8	8	0	
Total	7/9	55	43	12	

=== Representing Serbia ===
Division A

Year	Pos.	GP	W	L	Ref.
(Slovenia) 2007	Gold medal	8	7	1	
(Latvia) 2008	Gold medal	8	7	1	
(Greece) 2009	11th	8	3	5	
(Croatia) 2010	7th	9	4	5	
(Spain) 2011	13th	9	7	2	
(Slovenia) 2012	4th	9	7	2	
(Estonia) 2013	13th	9	6	3	
(Greece) 2014	Bronze medal	10	8	2	
(Italy) 2015	Gold medal	10	10	0	
(Finland) 2016	11th	7	4	3	
(Greece) 2017	5th	7	5	2	
(Germany) 2018	6th	7	5	2	
(Israel) 2019	15th	7	3	4	
(Lithuania) 2020	did not qualify (Cancelled) (Note: The tournaments were cancelled due to COVID-19 pandemic in Europe. Instead, there were held the FIBA U20 European Challengers in 2021. The Serbia team did not participate.)				
(Montenegro) 2021	did not qualify (Cancelled)				
(Montenegro) 2022	Did not qualify				
(Greece) 2023	5th	7	5	2	
(Poland) 2024	11th	7	4	3	
(Greece) 2025	4th	7	5	2	
(Slovenia) 2026	Silver medal	7	6	1	
Total	17/18	136	96	40	

Division B

After finishing 15th at the 2019 Division A Championship, the team was relegated to Division B.

Year	Pos.	GP	W	L	Ref.
(Georgia (country)) 2020	Cancelled				
(Georgia (country)) 2021	Cancelled				
(Georgia (country)) 2022	Gold medal	7	7	0	

== Individual awards ==
- Most Valuable Player
  - Igor Rakočević – 1998
  - Miloš Teodosić – 2007
  - Miroslav Raduljica – 2008
  - Marko Gudurić – 2015
  - Mihailo Bošković – 2022 (Division B)
- All-Tournament Team
  - Ivan Koljević – 2004
  - Luka Bogdanović – 2005
  - Nikola Peković – 2006
  - Dragan Labović – 2007
  - Miloš Teodosić – 2007
  - Miroslav Raduljica – 2008
  - Nikola Janković – 2014
  - Marko Gudurić – 2015
  - Nikola Rebić – 2015
  - Mihailo Bošković – 2022 (Division B)
  - Pavle Nikolić – 2025
  - Nikola Džepina – 2026
- Statistical leaders: Points
  - Igor Rakočević – 1998
- Statistical leaders: Assists
  - Miloš Teodosić – 2007
- Statistical leaders: Rebounds
  - Nenad Krstić – 2002
  - Miroslav Raduljica – 2008

== Coaches ==
=== FR Yugoslavia / Serbia and Montenegro ===
Years	Head coach	Assistant coach(es)
1996	Rajko Toroman	
1998	Goran Bojanić	
2000	Nenad Trajković	Slobodan Klipa
2002		
2004–2005	Luka Pavićević	
2006	Miroslav Nikolić	Branko Maksimović

=== Serbia ===
Years	Head coach	Assistant coach(es)
2007	Vlada Vukoičić	Miloš Pejić, Radenko Varagić
2008–2009	Slobodan Klipa	Vlada Jovanović^{2008}, Milan Mandarić^{2008}, Nikola Lazić^{2009}
2010	Boško Đokić	Marko Ičelić, Đorđe Adžić
2011–2012	Aleksandar Džikić	Srđan Flajs, Aleksandar Bućan^{2012}
2013	Vlada Jovanović	Marko Ičelić, Vladimir Zlatanović
2014	Dejan Mijatović	Marko Barać, Nikola Marković, Dušan Alimpijević
2015	Vladimir Đokić	Nenad Čanak
2016	Aleksandar Bućan	Aleksandar Bjelić, (Bosnia and Herzegovina) Žarko Milaković, Nikola Marković
2017	Vladimir Đokić	Nenad Čanak, Mihajlo Šušić
2018	Vlada Jovanović	Vladimir Zlatanović, Dušan Stojkov
2019	Oliver Popović	Vladimir Zlatanović, Ivan Radovanović
2022	Vladimir Jovanović	Miodrag Dinić, Marko Cvetković
2023	Nenad Čanak	Vule Avdalović, Dean Medan
2026	Nemanja Jovanović	Aleksandar Komnenić

== Past rosters ==
=== Representing FR Yugoslavia / Serbia and Montenegro ===
1996 Championship	1998 Championship	2000 Championship	2002 Championship	2004 Championship	2005 Championship	2006 Championship
4 Vlado Šćepanović; 5 Haris Brkić; 6 Dragan Lukovski; 7 Goran Karadžić; 8 Predrag Drobnjak; 9 Srđan Đurić; 10 Zlatko Bolić; 11 Mišel Lazarević; 12 Nikola Jestratijević; 13 Dragan Marković; 14 Dejan Mišković; 15 Jovo Stanojević	4 Milan Dozet; 5 Veselin Petrović; 6 Igor Rakočević; 7 Aleksandar Glintić; 8 Stevan Nađfeji; 9 Jovo Stanojević; 10 Marko Jarić; 11 None; 12 Dragan Ćeranić; 13 Dejan Milojević; 14 Ratko Varda; 15 Bojan Obradović	4 Miloš Vujanić; 5 Marko Kijac; 6 Goran Ćakić; 7 Vule Avdalović; 8 Nenad Pištoljević; 9 Vladimir Radmanović; 10 Marko Peković; 11 Žarko Čabarkapa; 12 Milan Bjegović; 13 Vojislav Gojnić; 14 Vanja Plisnić; 15 Slobodan Popović	4 Miljan Pupović; 5 Blagota Sekulić; 6 Bojan Bakić; 7 Jovan Koprivica; 8 Milutin Aleksić; 9 Aleksandar Pavlović; 10 Ivan Koljević; 11 Nenad Krstić; 12 Marko Jovanović; 13 Aleksandar Jevdić; 14 Marko Marinović; 15 Bojan Popović	4 Vukašin Aleksić; 5 Mlađen Šljivančanin; 6 Bojan Stajić; 7 Aleksandar Rašić; 8 Miloš Marković; 9 Branislav Ratkovica; 10 Ivan Koljević; 11 Žarko Rakočević; 12 Vladan Vukosavljević; 13 Kosta Perović; 14 Nenad Mišanović; 15 Ivan Radenović	4 Uroš Tripković; 5 Luka Bogdanović; 6 Boris Bakić; 7 Miljan Rakić; 8 Novica Veličković; 9 Vladimir Golubović; 10 Branislav Ratkovica; 11 Ivan Maraš; 12 Tadija Dragićević; 13 Milovan Raković; 14 Nikola Peković; 15 Vladimir Micov	4 Tadija Dragićević; 5 Milenko Tepić; 6 Boris Bakić; 7 Novica Veličković; 8 Dragan Labović; 9 Nenad Mijatović; 10 Branko Jereminov; 11 Miljan Rakić; 12 Nikola Peković; 13 Ivan Paunić; 14 Nikola Dragović; 15 Ivan Maraš

=== Representing Serbia ===
2007 Championship	2008 Championship	2009 Championship	2010 Championship	2011 Championship	2012 Championship
4 Miloš Teodosić; 5 Milenko Tepić; 6 Stefan Nikolić; 7 Marko Đurković; 8 Dragan Labović; 9 Maksim Kovačević; 10 Branko Jereminov; 11 Nenad Zivčević; 12 Vladimir Štimac; 13 Ivan Paunić; 14 Nikola Dragović; 15 Uroš Nikolić	4 Mladen Jeremić; 5 Stefan Sinovec; 6 Petar Despotović; 7 Nikola Koprivica; 8 Marko Kešelj; 9 Dušan Katnić; 10 Stefan Stojačić; 11 Bojan Radetić; 12 Boban Marjanović; 13 Milan Mačvan; 14 Miroslav Raduljica; 15 Marko Čakarević	4 Filip Čović; 5 Vladimir Lučić; 6 Aleksandar Mitrović; 7 Branko Lazić; 8 Nemanja Nedović; 9 Nikola Marković; 10 Stefan Stojačić; 11 Stefan Birčević; 12 Dragan Milosavljević; 13 Bojan Subotić; 14 Nikola Maravić; 15 Duško Bunić	Andreja Milutinović; Bogdan Obrenović; Bogdan Riznić; Bojan Subotić; Nemanja Nedović; Aleksandar Mitrović; Nemanja Arnautović; Đorđe Majstorović; Branislav Đekić; Danilo Anđušić; Nemanja Jaramaz; Dejan Musli	Nemanja Jaramaz; Nikša Nikolić; Dušan Ognjenović; Filip Đuran; Nemanja Nedović; Milić Blagojević; Danilo Anđušić; Lazar Radosavljević; Milan Milovanović; Nikola Rondović; Branislav Đekić; Nikola Kalinić	Aleksandar Cvetković; Petar Lambić; Nenad Miljenović; Nemanja Dangubić; Bogdan Bogdanović; Luka Mitrović; Marko Gujaničić; Marko Luković; Nemanja Bešović; Đorđe Drenovac; Ivan Marinković; Stefan Nastić

2013 Championship	2014 Championship	2015 Championship	2016 Championship	2017 Championship	2018 Championship
Pavle Reljić; Nemanja Krstić; Ivan Marinković; Mladen Đorđević; Saša Avramović; Luka Mitrović; Nenad Miljenović; Mihajlo Andrić; Andrija Bojić; Đorđe Milošević; Nemanja Bezbradica; Miloš Janković	Mladen Đorđević; Đorđe Kaplanović; Stefan Pot; Ognjen Jaramaz; Jovan Novak; Nikola Rebić; Marko Tejić; Ognjen Dobrić; Nikola Janković; Petar Aranitović; Mihajlo Andrić; Đoko Šalić	Nikola Rebić; Rade Zagorac; Marko Gudurić; Petar Rakićević; Dragan Apić; Božidar Babović; Ognjen Jaramaz; Dejan Davidovac; Aleksandar Bursać; Đorđe Kaplanović; Đoko Šalić; Marko Tejić	Stefan Peno; Stefan Simić; Slobodan Jovanović; Danilo Ostojić; Radovan Đoković; Vanja Marinković; Ilija Đoković; Stefan Lazarević; Mladen Grušanović; Marko Radovanović; Vasilije Vučetić; Stevan Jeremić	4 Stefan Peno; 6 Nemanja Kapetanović; 7 Miloš Glišić; 8 Slobodan Jovanović; 9 Vanja Marinković; 10 Nikola Tanasković; 11 Stefan Đorđević; 12 Boriša Simanić; 13 Stefan Kenić; 14 Aleksa Stepanović; 30 Novak Musić; 31 Nikola Rakočević	5 Andrija Marjanović; 6 Vuk Vulikić; 7 Aleksandar Aranitović; 8 Novak Musić; 9 Dušan Beslać; 10 Tadija Tadić; 12 Aleksa Radanov; 14 Aleksa Stepanović; 22 Boriša Simanić; 24 Miloš Glišić; 45 Stefan Đorđević; 77 Stefan Momirov

2019 Championship	2022 Division B	2023 Championship	2026 Championship
1 Nikola Mišković; 4 Aleksa Uskoković; 5 Andrija Marjanović; 7 Vuk Vulikić; 10 Tadija Tadić; 11 Ranko Simović; 12 Mihailo Jovičić; 15 Marko Pecarski; 20 Miloš Stajčić; 21 Vuk Đorđević; 24 Aleksa Matić; 77 Stefan Momirov	00 Luka Aksentijević; 1 Luka Paunović; 3 Marko Andrić; 4 Aleksa Kovačević; 5 Mihailo Bošković; 7 Uroš Paunović; 9 Nikola Šaranović; 10 Petar Kovačević; 17 Pavle Stepanović; 25 Vojin Medarević; 33 Mihailo Mušikić; 55 Nikola Manojlović	1 Matija Belić; 5 Nikola Petojević; 6 Stefan Stefanović; 7 Marko Vukčević; 10 Nikola Šaranović; 11 Čedomir Matić; 13 Danilo Labović; 16 Bogdan Zimonjić; 18 Stefan Dabović; 28 Luka Paunov; 33 Filip Branković; 77 Mihailo Petrović	1 Matija Popović; 3 Nikola Dzepina; 4 Petar Radović; 5 Marko Tofoski; 6 Andrija Djurić; 7 Andrej Lučić; 8 Mitar Bošnjaković; 10 Miloš Šojić; 11 Nikola Bundalo; 22 Aleksa Stanojević; 33 Petar Ostojić; 88 Uroš Šuput

== See also ==
- Serbia women's national under-20 basketball team
- Serbian men's university basketball team
- Serbia men's national under-19 basketball team
- Serbia men's national under-18 basketball team
- Serbia men's national under-17 basketball team
- Serbia men's national under-16 basketball team
- FR Yugoslavia men's national under-21 basketball team
