= Nasos Bazinas =

Greek basketball player

No. 77 – PAOK Thessaloniki
- Position: Point guard
- League: Greek Basketball League; EuroCup

Personal information
- Born: 18 October 2003 (age 23) Patras, Greece
- Listed height: 1.94 m (6 ft 4 in)

Career information
- Playing career: 2019–present

Career history
- 2019–2026: Promitheas Patras
- 2022–2023: →AO Agriniou
- 2026–present: PAOK Thessaloniki
Medals
Men's basketball
Representing Greece
European U-20 Championship
Bronze medal – third place	2023 Greece	Under-20

Athanasios "Nasos" Bazinas (Greek: Αθανάσιος «Νάσος» Μπαζίνας; born 18 October 2003) is a Greek professional basketball player for PAOK Thessaloniki of the Greek Basketball League (GBL) and the EuroCup. A 1.94 m point guard, he began his professional career with Promitheas Patras, progressing from the club's youth system to the senior team and becoming team captain at the age of 21.

Bazinas has represented Greece at several youth international levels, winning a bronze medal at the 2023 FIBA U20 European Championship, before progressing to the senior national team.

== Early life and youth career ==
Bazinas was born in Patras, Greece, on 18 October 2003.

He joined the youth development system of Promitheas Patras in 2018 at the age of 14.

In 2019, Bazinas was a member of the Promitheas under-16 team that won the Greek national under-16 championship. He subsequently continued his development within the club's youth system while also representing Greece at youth international level.

== Professional career ==
=== Promitheas Patras ===
Bazinas began participating in first-team activities with Promitheas while still a teenager and made his Greek Basketball League debut during the 2019–20 season.

After spending his first professional seasons with Promitheas, Bazinas was loaned to A.O. Agriniou for the 2022–23 season, competing in Greece's second-tier Elite League. He returned to Promitheas in the summer of 2023 and established himself in the senior team's rotation.

During the 2023–24 Greek Basketball League season, Bazinas appeared in 27 league games, averaging 3.7 points, 0.9 rebounds and 1.9 assists in 12.2 minutes per game. He also appeared in 14 Basketball Champions League games, averaging 1.8 points in seven minutes per game.

In July 2024, Bazinas signed a contract extension with Promitheas through the summer of 2029.

His role increased during the following season as he became a regular member of the rotation in both domestic and European competition. His development also led to his first call-up to the senior Greek national team in the summer of 2025.

Ahead of the 2025–26 season, Bazinas was named captain of Promitheas, becoming the team's captain before his 22nd birthday.

In September 2025, Bazinas produced one of his most prominent performances for Promitheas in the Greek Basketball Super Cup final against Olympiacos. He scored 17 points on 5-of-5 shooting from the field and 4-of-4 from the free-throw line, while also recording five assists and three steals. He finished the game with a performance index rating of 23, the highest of any player in the final.

During the 2025–26 Greek league season, Bazinas took on an expanded role with Promitheas, averaging 7.1 points and 4.6 assists per game.

On 14 March 2026, he recorded 19 points, nine assists and three rebounds in a 99–89 road victory over Mykonos, finishing with a performance index rating of 25.

=== PAOK ===
In May 2026, Bazinas agreed to join PAOK Thessaloniki after PAOK reached an agreement with Promitheas for his transfer.

On 14 May 2026, PAOK announced that Bazinas had signed a four-year contract with the club, running through 2030.

The transfer followed a period of increased responsibility at Promitheas in which Bazinas had become the club's captain, established himself as a regular senior player and entered the Greek senior national-team setup.

== National team career ==
=== Youth national teams ===
Bazinas represented Greece at multiple youth international levels, including the under-16, under-18 and under-20 national teams.

At the 2023 FIBA U20 European Championship in Heraklion, Greece, he helped the Greek under-20 national team win the bronze medal. During the tournament, Bazinas averaged 6.3 points, 4.1 rebounds and 4.7 assists per game.

=== Senior national team ===
In July 2025, head coach Vassilis Spanoulis called Bazinas to the Greek senior national team for the first time as part of the preparation squad for EuroBasket 2025.

He made his senior national-team debut in August 2025 in a preparation game against Belgium at the OAKA Indoor Hall.

Bazinas was not included in Greece's final 12-man roster for EuroBasket 2025. He later made official competitive appearances for the senior national team during the 2027 FIBA Basketball World Cup European Qualifiers.

== Career highlights ==
- Greek Under-16 Championship: 2019
- FIBA U20 European Championship bronze medal: 2023
- Promitheas Patras captain: 2025–26
