= Georgía Olga Kristiansen =

Icelandic basketball player and referee

Personal information
- Born: 3 January 1979 (age 47) Iceland

Career information
- Playing career: 1993–2006
- Position: Basketball referee
- Number: 7
- Officiating career: 2006–present

Career history
- 1993–1998: KR
- 1998–2000: ÍS
- 2001-2006: KR

Georgía Olga Kristiansen (born 3 January 1979) is an Icelandic basketball referee and a former player. She was the first female referee to officiate in the highest competitive tier men's basketball league in Iceland, Úrvalsdeild karla, and the second female referee to officiate in the top-tier Icelandic women's basketball league, Úrvalsdeild kvenna, after Indíana Sólveig Marquez. Georgía and Indíana were also the first female referee pair to officiate together a highest competitive tier game in Iceland.

== Personal life ==
Georgía is the great granddaughter of the Danish-born Georgia Björnsson, who she is named after, and Sveinn Björnsson, the first president of Iceland. Georgía's brother is Davíð Tómas Tómasson, a musician and FIBA referee. On 7 December 2017 they became the first siblings to officiate together a highest competitive tier game in Iceland.
