= Afrique-sur-Seine =

1955 French film

Video cover

Afrique-sur-Seine is a French film produced by Jacques Mélo Kane, Mamadou Sarr and Paulin Soumanou Vieyra in 1955.

One of the first short features produced by Africans, filmed in Paris in 1955, it has been called the beginning of African cinema.

== Synopsis ==
Denied the authorisation he needed to film in Sénégal under the Laval Decree, Vieyra decided to film his first short feature in Paris. The film recounts the life of African students in Paris, their encounters and the nostalgia they felt far from their native land.

== Credits ==
- Title : Afrique-sur-Seine
- Production : Jacques Mélo Kane, Mamadou Sarr, Paulin Soumanou Vieyra
- Screenplay : Mamadou Sarr
- Montage : Paulin Soumanou Vieyra
- Country of origin of producers : Bénin, France, French Guiana, Sénégal
- Production : Groupe africain de cinéma
- Language : French
- Format : 16 mm, black and white
- Genre : fiction
- Length : 21 minutes

== Distribution ==
- Marpessa Dawn
- Philippe Mory

== See also ==
- Cinéma africain
- Cinema of Africa
