= Vuk Vulikić =

Serbian basketball player

No. 7 – Szedeák
- Position: Point guard
- League: Nemzeti Bajnokság I/A

Personal information
- Born: 7 March 1999 (age 27) Belgrade, Serbia, FR Yugoslavia
- Listed height: 1.94 m (6 ft 4 in)
- Listed weight: 90 kg (198 lb)

Career information
- College: UTEP (2020–2021) UC San Diego (2021–2023)
- Playing career: 2016–present

Career history
- 2016–2020: Dynamic BG
- 2023–2024: Mladost Zemun
- 2024–2025: CS Dinamo București
- 2025–present: Szedeák
Medals
Men's basketball
Representing Serbia
FIBA Europe Under-18 Championship
Gold medal – first place	2017 Slovakia	U18 Team

Vuk Vulikić (Serbian Cyrillic: Вук Вуликић; born 7 March 1999) is a Serbian basketball player for Szedeák of the Nemzeti Bajnokság I/A.

== Early career ==
Vulikić played basketball for youth systems of Mondo Basket, Zemun (2011–2015), and Vizura Shark (2015–16) in his hometown.

== College career ==
In July 2020, Vulikić committed to play basketball for the UTEP Miners.

== Professional career ==
In 2016, Vulikić joined Dynamic BG. He left Dynamic BG in July 2020 to play college basketball in the NCAA's Division I at UCSD.

== National team career ==
Vulikić was a member of the Serbian U-18 national basketball team that won the gold medal at the 2017 FIBA Europe Under-18 Championship. Over seven tournament games, he averaged 6.0 points, 3.0 rebounds and 4.9 assists per game. Also, he was a member of the Serbian U-16 national basketball team that participated at the 2015 FIBA Europe Under-16 Championship. Vulikić was a member of the Serbian under-20 team that finished 15th at the 2019 FIBA U20 European Championship in Tel Aviv, Israel. Over seven tournament games, he averaged 6.9 points, 2.0 rebounds, and 2.1 assists per game.
