= Myriam Warner-Vieyra =

- Born: Annoncia Josèphe Marguerite Warner; March 25, 1939; Pointe-à-Pitre, Guadeloupe
- Died: December 29, 2017 (aged 78); Tours, Indre-et-Loire, France
- Burial place: Cimetière Bel-Air, Dakar, Senegal
- Education: Cheikh Anta Diop University
- Occupations: Librarian, novelist, short-story writer, & poet
- Notable work: Le Quimboiseur L’avait Dit (1980); Juletane (1982); Femmes échouées (1988)
- Spouse: Paulin Soumanou Vieyra
- Children: 3

Myriam Warner-Vieyra (March 25, 1939 to December 29, 2017) was a Guadeloupean-born Francophone writer and librarian, focusing on novels and short stories. While being most known for her 1982 work Juletane, she's also known for her cultural and social work. Most notably, Warner-Vieyra was a founding member of the Dakar chapter of Zonta International, having acted as treasurer, president, and governor of the chapter.

== Early life and education ==
Myriam Warner-Vieyra (born as Annoncia Josèphe Marguerite Warner) was born in Pointe-à-Pitre, Guadeloupe in the French West Indies. Warner-Vieyra's father was born in Antigua, where he learned to become a shoemaker, learning his trade according to English techniques. Before the Second World War, shoes were generally not imported in Guadeloupe, but made locally, resulting in his craftsmanship being very appreciated within Guadeloupe. Meanwhile, her mother went to school until receiving Brevet elementaire (diploma following 4 years of secondary education within the French school system) and therefore wasn't engaged in any particular trade. Following the death of her father when she was 7 years old, her mother went to France to find work, resulting in Warner-Vieyra living under the care of her grandmother, something she later described as "the happiest time of her life".

Warner-Vieyra attended primary school in Guadeloupe, having a good memory and being able to read fluently. However, she struggled academically due to her undiagnosed dyslexia. That alongside writing left-handed delayed her writing development. Warner-Vieyra lived there until the age of twelve, eventually moving to Paris, France to live with her mother again, continuing her education in the second arrondissement, repeating the 5th grade before passing the Certificat d’Etudes. While initially completing three years of training to become a hairdresser and returning to Guadeloupe in 1957 with the goal of having her own shop, she was ultimately unsuccessful due to low salary. These financial barriers caused her to return to Paris, where she worked in the postal service. There, she met Paulin Soumanou Vieyra, a Beninese / Senegalese film director and historian, marrying him in April 1961.

Warner-Vieyra eventually settled in Senegal, where she continued her education, studying English and history before receiving training and earning a diploma in library science at Cheikh Anta Diop University in Dakar. Warner-Vieyra later worked as a librarian at the Social Pediatrics Institute of the University of Dakar starting in 1967.

== Career ==
Warner-Vieyra had always been interested in reading and telling stories from a young age, and with that came an interest in writing. She had written a diary and poetry while young, and often told herself stories. Warner-Vieyra later decided to write these stories down to be able to keep and read them later on. She cites a particular moment where writing became easy to her, in that she had been watching her youngest son and Ousmane Sembene’s son while her husband and her 2 older kids were traveling. Finding some time to read, she later ended up writing in one of the kids’ notebooks.

Warner-Vieyra's first published novel in Le Quimboiseur L’avait Dit (As the Sorcerer Said) was written in this manner, as the manuscript was sent to Christiane Diop, the director of Presence Africane. Receiving approval from the director, the final manuscript of Le Quimboiseur L’avait Dit was published by Presence Africane in 1980, later receiving an English translation in 1982. Le Quimboiseur L’avait Dit can be described as a story about a young Black girl shaped by her mother's absence and indifference alongside a lack of sense of belonging and selfhood, being representative of a Caribbean society that doesn't know where it stands.

This was followed by her second novel Juletane, released in 1982. Juletane, viewed as her most-popular work is the story of a Caribbean woman who married a Senegalese man who, she discovers, is already married.This novel highlighted the psychological dangers for diasporic Caribbean women in relation to migration. Warner-Vieyra later published a collection of nine short stories titled Femmes échouées in 1988, ranging in topic of fictional West Indian experiences.

In addition to her literary career, Warner-Vieyra was involved in cultural and social work. in 1969, she was one of the founding members of the Dakar chapter of Zonta International, an international association of women intended to promote good relations between people. Warner-Vieyra eventually becoming the chapter's treasurer, president, and governor. Alongside that, Warner-Vieyra represented Senegal for the Africa America Institute, was a member of the Senegalese Writers' Association and the Friends of the Henriette Bathily Women's Museum in Gorée, Dakar, Senegal, having partook in conferences and seminars throughout the world.

== Death ==
On December 29, 2017, Warner-Vieyra died in Tours, Indre-et-Loire, France at the age of 78. She's survived by her 2 sons Makandjou Ola Jacques and Stéphane Soumanou Vieyram, as well as a daughter Célia Vieyra.

== Bibliography ==
=== Works ===
- Warner-Vieyra, Myriam. (1980). Le Quimboiseur L’avait Dit. Paris: Présence africaine.
- Warner-Vieyra, Myriam. (1982). Juletane. Paris; Dakar: Présence africaine.
- Warner-Vieyra, Myriam. (1988). Femmes échouées. Paris; Dakar: Présence africaine. Short stories.

==== English Translations ====
- Warner-Vieyra, Myriam. (1982). As the Sorcerer Said. Harlow, Essex, United Kingdom: Longman (English translation by Dorothy S. Blair)
- Warner-Vieyra, Myriam. (1987). Juletane. Oxford / Portsmouth, N.H.: Heinemann (English translation by Betty Wilson)
