= Orri Gunnarsson =

Icelandic basketball player

Stjarnan
- Position: Forward
- League: Úrvalsdeild karla

Personal information
- Born: 21 August 2003 (age 23)
- Listed height: 194 cm (6 ft 4 in)
- Listed weight: 96 kg (212 lb)

Career information
- Playing career: 2019–present

Career history
- 2019–2021: Stjarnan
- 2020–2021: → Álftanes
- 2021–2023: Haukar
- 2023–2024: Swans Gmunden
- 2024–present: Stjarnan

Career highlights
- Icelandic league champion (2025); Icelandic Cup (2020); Icelandic Super Cup (2019)

Orri Gunnarsson (born 21 August 2003) is an Icelandic professional basketball player who plays as a forward for Stjarnan in the Úrvalsdeild karla. He also plays on the Iceland national team.

== Club career ==
Orri grew up in Garðabær, where he played at youth level with Stjarnan. From 2021 to 2023 he played for Haukar. He then joined the Austrian club Swans Gmunden in 2023. In his debut in the season-opening "champion of champions" matchup, he scored 11 points, played 29 minutes, grabbed two rebounds, and dished two assists while shooting 3-of-5 from three-point range.

He returned to Iceland in 2024 and signed a two-year contract with Stjarnan, helping them win the national championship for the first time in 2025.

== International career ==
Orri represented Iceland as an under-16 and an under-18. At the under-20 level, at the 2022 European Championship he averaged 14.9 points, 3.3 rebounds, and 2.4 assists per game, earning All-Tournament Team honors, and at the 2023 European Championship he averaged 18.3 points, 3.9 rebounds, and 1.4 assists per game.

He debuted with the Icelandic senior national team later in 2023 and was part of the roster for the 2024 FIBA Men's Pre-Qualifying Olympic Qualifying Tournaments – Europe in Turkey, averaging 9.7 points, 4 rebounds, and 1 assist per game.

Orri played for Iceland at EuroBasket 2025. During qualification, he averaged 2.8 points and 1.2 rebounds over five games. He was made a starter after Haukur Pálsson was injured.

== Career statistics ==
=== National team ===
Team	Tournament	Pos.	GP	PPG	RPG	APG
Iceland	EuroBasket 2025	22nd	4	4.0	2.5	0.8
