= Marko Ičelić =

Serbian basketball coach

Leotar
- Position: Head coach
- League: Bosnia and Herzegovina Championship

Personal information
- Born: 20 January 1979 (age 47) Užička Požega, SR Serbia, Yugoslavia
- Coaching career: 1999–present

Career history

Coaching
- 1999–2004: OKK Beograd (youth)
- 2004–2007: OKK Beograd (assistant)
- 2007–2011: OKK Beograd
- 2012–2013: BKK Radnički
- 2013–2014: KK Leotar
- 2014–2015: KK Kožuv
- 2015–2016: Al Jazira SC
- 2016–2017: KK Klik Arilje
- 2017–2018: Al Sharjah
- 2018–2021: Al Jazira SC
- 2021–2024: KK Leotar
- 2024-2025: KK Primorje
Medals
Men's basketball
Head coach for Serbia
U18 European Championship
Silver medal – second place	2011 Poland	Team
FIBA Europe Under-16 Championship
Bronze medal – third place	2012 Lithuania/Latvia	Team

Marko Ičelić (Serbian Cyrillic: Марко Ичелић; born 20 January 1979) is a Serbian professional basketball coach for Leotar of the Bosnia and Herzegovina Championship.

== Coaching career ==
Ičelić started his coaching career at OKK Beograd as a coach for youth selections. In 2004, he was promoted to an assistant coach. In the first two seasons he was assistant to Dejan Mijatović, while in the 2006–07 season, he assisted Slobodan Nikolić.

Prior to the 2007–08 season, Ičelić became a head coach for OKK Beograd of the Basketball League of Serbia B. In the next season, his team finished second and got promoted to the Basketball League of Serbia. In the mid-season of the 2011–12 BLS season, he parted ways with OKK Beograd.

Prior to the 2012–13 BLS season, Ičelić was named a head coach for Radnički Belgrade. In February 2013, Radnički parted ways with him. In the 2013–14 season, Ičelić coached Leotar of the Championship of Bosnia and Herzegovina. In summer 2014, he became a head coached for Kožuv of the Macedonian First League. In January 2015, Ičelić parted ways with Kožuv.

In the 2015–16 season, Ičelić was a head coach for Al Jazira SC of the UAE National League. In the 2016–17 season, Ičelić was a head coach for Klik Arilje that won the 3rd-tier First Regional League of Serbia – West Division. In the 2017–18 season, Ičelić was a head coach for Al Sharjah of the UAE National League.

In summer 2018, Ičelić became a head coach for Al Jazira SC for the second time. In August 2021, Leotar named him as their new head coach. In season 2023/2024 he won the Cup of the Republic of Srpska with KK Leotar.

=== National team coaching career ===
Ičelić was an assistant coach of the Serbia U20 national team at the 2010 FIBA Europe Under-20 Championship in Croatia and at the 2013 FIBA Europe Under-20 Championship in Estonia.

Ičelić was the head coach of the Serbia U18 national team that won the silver medal at the 2011 FIBA Europe Under-18 Championship in Poland. His team lost to Spain in the final game, 71–65.

Ičelić was the head coach for the Serbia U16 national team that won the bronze medal at the 2012 FIBA Europe Under-16 Championship in Latvia and Lithuania.
