= Jemima & Johnny =

Jemima & Johnny (1966) is a British/South African dramatic short film set in London. It is the first film by South African filmmaker Lionel Ngakane, and won a plate at the 1966 Venice Film Festival. Just 29 minutes long, the film takes place in Notting Hill, in an environment still affected by the 1958 Notting Hill race riots. The story concerns two very young children, one, Johnny, the son of a white supremacist, the other, Jemima, the daughter of black Caribbean immigrants, who explore London on their own together, and how their innocent relationship affects the lives of those around them.
