= Lionel Ngakane =

South African actor and filmmaker (1928–2003)

- Born: 17 July 1928; Pretoria, South Africa
- Died: 26 November 2003 (aged 75); Rustenburg, South Africa
- Education: Fort Hare University College; University of Witwatersrand
- Occupations: Filmmaker and actor
- Notable work: Jemima and Johnny
- Awards: Order of Ikhamanga in Silver

Lionel Ngakane (17 July 1928 – 26 November 2003) was a South African filmmaker and actor, who lived in exile in the United Kingdom from the 1950s until 1994, when he returned to South Africa after the end of apartheid. His 1965 film Jemima and Johnny, inspired by the 1958 "race riots" in Notting Hill, London, won awards at the Venice and Rimini film festivals. In the 1960s, Ngakane was a founding member of the Pan African Federation of Filmmakers (FEPACI) and Fespaco, the Panafrican Film and Television Festival of Ouagadougou (FESPACO).

== Biography ==
Ngakane was born in Pretoria, South Africa. In 1936, his family and he moved to the Sophiatown neighbourhood of Johannesburg. His father (a teacher) set up a hostel with Alan Paton, author of the 1948 novel Cry, The Beloved Country. Ngakane was educated at Fort Hare University College and the University of Witwatersrand, and worked on Drum and Zonk magazines from 1948 to 1950. In 1950, he began his career in film as an assistant director and actor in the film version of Cry, the Beloved Country (1951), directed by Zoltan Korda. Shortly thereafter, Ngakane went into exile in the United Kingdom.

As an actor, he appeared in films, including The Mark of the Hawk in 1957 (with Eartha Kitt), on television — Quatermass and the Pit (1958) and the spy series Danger Man (Deadline, 1962) with Patrick McGoohan, and on stage — in Errol John's Moon on a Rainbow Shawl, and Wole Soyinka's play The Lion and the Jewel at the Royal Court Theatre in 1966.

Ngakane returned to South Africa after the end of apartheid in 1994.

He is best remembered for his short film Jemima and Johnny (1965), inspired by the 1958 "race riots" in Notting Hill, London. It won awards at the Venice and Rimini film festivals. He also directed documentaries on apartheid and African development. He was honorary president of the Pan African Federation of Filmmakers (FEPACI), which organization he had originated in 1967 as a lobbying group for the support of African filmmakers.

He died in Rustenburg, South Africa, in 2003, aged 75.

== Awards and honours ==
In 1997, Ngakane was awarded an honorary doctorate by the University of Natal.

In 2003, he was awarded the South African Order of Ikhamanga in Silver for his "outstanding achievement in the field of movie-making and contribution to the development of the film industry in South Africa and on the continent".

In 2020, Ngakane was honoured at the RapidLion South African International Film Festival.
