= Pan African Federation of Filmmakers =

Organisation of filmmakers of Africa and its Diaspora

The Pan African Federation of Filmmakers (Fédération Panafricaine des Cinéastes or FEPACI) is an organisation representing filmmakers from the continent of Africa. It was officially established in 1970, after a foundation meeting held in Tunis in 1969.

== History ==
The Pan African Federation of Filmmakers (French: Fédération Panafricaine des Cinéastes), abbreviated as FEPACI, was founded in 1969 by a provisional committee at the inaugural Panafrican Film and Television Festival of Ouagadougou (FESPACO), and officially established in 1970 in Tunis, at the Carthage Film Festival. A document called "The Algiers Charter" was adopted during a symposium of African filmmakers organised by the Cinémathèque algérienne in the Ibn Khaldoun cinema in July 1969. Here pioneering filmmakers such as Paulin Soumanou Vieyra, Ousmane Sembène, and Mahama Johnson Traoré played leading roles. Others at the symposium included Youssef Chahine (Egypt), Mohammed Lakhdar-Hamina (Algeria), Desiré Ecaré (Ivory Coast), Ahmed Rachedi (Algeria), and Lionel Ngakane (South Africa). The group called for the creation of an organisation representing African filmmakers as well as a Pan-African film festival. Algerian director Tahar Cheriaa, who was in prison at the time, was released after an international appeal started by the 40 African filmmakers. The Algiers Charter was later affirmed in Cheriaa's presence in Tunis in 1970, on the occasion of a foundational congress.

In April 2006, FEPACI, under secretary general Jacques Behanzin, collaborated with the South African Department of Arts and Culture and the National Film and Video Foundation (NFVF) of South Africa to host the first African Film Summit in the Tshwane, Gauteng, South Africa. The summit arose from calls by many in the industry to create an African commission on the audiovisual and cinema industries and a fund to promote the African cinema industry and television programmes. Many representatives of industry-related organisations, such as the Guild of African Directors and the East African Filmmakers Forum, and government statutory bodies, such as the Nigerian Film Corporation, took part in panel discussions at the summit.

After the summit, a FEPACI Congress took place in Tshwane, at which, for the first time in its history, members voted that while FEPACI headquarters should remain based in Ouagadougou, the FEPACI Secretariat would be based in South Africa from 2006 to 2010, under the leadership of South African Secretary General Seipati Bulane Hopa.

In June 2007, FEPACI called for an investigation into the threatened closure of the Film Resource Unit in South Africa. The FRU is a major distributor of African films, and, according to FEPACI's statement is also "a political, ideological platform that creates a sense of pride and resonance that Africa can stand by itself and can initiate, own and control instruments of change and transformation".

On 7 June 2017, a letter of agreement was signed among FEPACI, UNESCO, and American director Martin Scorsese's Film Foundation World Cinema Project, to formalise their partnership on the African Film Heritage Project, which has as its mission the preservation of African cinema.

== Description ==
Based in Ouagadougou, Burkina Faso, FEPACI described itself as "the continental voice of filmmakers from various regions of Africa and the diaspora".

== People ==
=== Founders ===
Founding members of both FEPACI and FESPACO included:

- Gadalla Gubara (Sudan)
- Lionel Ngakane (South Africa)
- King Ampaw (Ghana)
- Philippe Mory (Gabon)
- Paulin Soumanou Vieyra (Benin/Senegal)
- Ousmane Sembène (Senegal)
- Mahama Johnson Traoré (Senegal)
- Youssef Chahine (Egypt)
- Mohammed Lakhdar-Hamina (Algeria)
- Desiré Ecaré (Ivory Coast)
- Ahmed Rachedi (Algeria)

=== Officeholders ===
As cited by one source, Senegalese filmmaker Ababacar Samb Makharam served as secretary general from 1971 to 1977. However, another source states that another Senegalese filmmaker, Mahama Johnson Traoré, occupied the role from 1975 to 1983.

Burkinabé filmmaker Gaston Kaboré (b.1951) had a longstanding involvement with the organisation as well as FESPACO, and was, according to at least two source, secretary general from 1985 to 1997. However, a 2020 article states that Filippe Savadogo was secretary general in 1989.

In 2000, Burkinabé filmmaker Pierre Rouamba was coordinator of FEPACI.

As of January 2016, Kenyan filmmaker Jane Munene-Murago was executive director.

Gabonese filmmaker Charles Mensah (1948–2011), who was director general of the Centre National du Cinéma Gabonais (CENACI; later known as Institut Gabonais de l'Image et du Son (Gabonese Institute of Image and Sound), or IGIS), for more than 20 years, served a term as president of FEPACI.
