= Mahama Johnson Traoré =

Senegalese film director

- Born: 1 January 1942; Dakar, French West Africa
- Died: 8 March 2010 (aged 68); Paris, France
- Occupations: Film director, producer, screenwriter, author
- Years active: 1960s–1990s
- Notable work: Diankha-bi, Diègue-Bi, Lambaye, Reou-Takh

Mahama Johnson Traoré (1942–2010) was a Senegalese film director, writer, and co-founder of the Ouagadougou-based Panafrican Film and Television Festival of Ouagadougou (FESPACO). He is known for his many films in the Wolof language, and for his treatment of feminist themes in his films. His best known films were Diankha-bi (1969), Diègue-Bi (1970), Lambaye (1972), and Reou-Takh (1972).

== Early life and education ==
Mahama Johnson Traoré was born on 1 January 1942 in Dakar, French West Africa. The son of a businessman, Traoré studied in Senegal, Mali, and France to be an electrical engineer. In Paris he quit his studies to follow a passion for film. There he enrolled in the Conservatoire libre du cinéma français, an avant-garde school inspired by current German and Italian cinema and the theoretical approaches of the Office de Radiodiffusion Télévision Française.

== Career ==
=== Films ===
Traoré became one of the premier filmmakers of the post-independence generation, associated with artists such as Sembene Ousmane. Traoré made a number of Wolof language films with strong social messages from the late 1960s to the early 1980s. His best known films were Diankha-bi (The Young Girl, or The Girl), 1968, which won the Grand Prize at the Dinard film Festival, and its sequel Diègue-Bi (The Young Woman, 1970). Both had a strong feminist character which reappeared in his works, along with concerns for Pan-Africanism and struggle against unjust authority. All these were combined in another well-known work, Njangaan ("The Disciple", 1975), which follows a young boy, escaping an abusive father, who falls prey to an equally abusive religious teacher.

Traoré was working on an historical drama Nder ou les flammes de l'honneur, co-written with Algerian producer Mariem Hamidat, at the time of his death. It is a story of the women of the town of N'Der in the Senegalese Waalo Kingdom who committed suicide rather than surrender to the Maure invaders in 1820.

=== Other activities ===
Traoré was one of the founders in 1969 of the long-running Panafrican Film and Television Festival of Ouagadougou FESPACO and the Carthage Film Festival.

From 1975 to 1983 he was secretary general of the Pan African Federation of Filmmakers (Fédération panafricaine des cinéastes; FEPACI).

From 1983 to 1985 Traoré was director of the Société nationale de production cinématographique du Sénégal (SNPC). In all of the offices held by him, he played a prominent role in the relations between African states and filmmakers. One academic quotes him saying that there was not a single film made in Senegal during the 1970s that did not receive some form of state support from organs of government such as SNPC, the Acualitiés Sénégalaise, and the Service du Cinéma, which provided films for government ministries, often without ministerial control over subject or content. In a 1983 piece he called this relationship, common in Francophone West Africa at the time, "cultural bribery."

He was also founder, editor, and publisher from 2008 of the PanAfrican arts magazine, Cahiers d'Afrique. in 2009 he was made Chevalier de l'ordre des arts, des lettres et de la communication by the government of Burkina Faso. In July 2009, he served as a jury member at the second Festival culturel panafricain d'Alger (PANAF).

== Later life and death ==
Traoré was active with FESPACO and filmmaking up until his death.

He died on 8 March 2010 in Paris, after suffering a long term kidney illness, and was interred in the Muslim cemetery of Yoff, near Dakar.

Newspapers noted the coincidence that Traoré had died on International Women's Day.

== Filmography ==
- 1969 : Diankha-bi (The Young Girl/The Girl)
- 1969 : L'Enfer des innocents
- 1970 : Diègue-Bi (The Young Woman)
- 1971 : L'Étudiant africain face aux mutations
- 1971 : L'Exode rural (The Rural Exodus)
- 1972 : Lambaye
- 1972 : Reou-Takh (Big City)
- 1974 : Garga M'Bossé (the Cactus)
- 1975 : Njangaan (the Disciple)
- 1980 : Sarax si (the Alms)
- 1982 : La médecine traditionnelle
