= Davíð Tómas Tómasson =

Icelandic FIBA referee and musician (born 1988)

- Born: 21 October 1988 (age 37)
- Basketball career
- Position: Basketball referee
- Officiating career: 2006–2025
- Also known as: Dabbi T
- Genres: Hip hop, Rap, PBR&B
- Years active: 2004–present
- Formerly of: 32c

Musical career

Davíð Tómas Tómasson (born 21 October 1988) is an Icelandic businessman, musician and former FIBA referee.

== Refereeing ==
In 2017, Davíð was named an official FIBA referee. In 2019, Davíð was barred from refereeing ÍR's games during the Úrvalsdeild karla playoffs after he posted an Instagram picture of himself and ÍR player Matthías Orri Sigurðarson, alluding to their connection to the Vesturbær district in Reykjavík. In 2023, he was named the Icelandic Basketball Referee of the Year.

In September 2025, he announced that his referee career was effectively over due to communication difficulties with the Icelandic Basketball Association and its referee board.

=== Awards ===
- Icelandic Basketball Referee of the Year
  - 2023

== Musical career ==
Davíð has performed under the name Dabbi T since his late teenage years. At the age of sixteen, he released his first single, Þröngar píkur (English: Tight Pussies). In 2007 he released the rap album Óheflað málfar (English: Unrestricted Speech). He was a member of the group 32c along with Emmsjé Gauti and Nagmús. In 2017, Davíð released the album T, his first album in ten years.

=== Albums ===
Solo

- 2007: Óheflað málfar
- 2017: T

Singles

- 2004: Þröngar píkur
- 2016: Blár

== Business career ==
In May 2024, Davíð was hired as the managing director of Moodup, an Icelandic software company.

== Personal life ==
Davíð's sister is basketball referee Georgía Olga Kristiansen. On 7 December 2017 they became the first siblings to officiate together a highest competitive tier game in Iceland.
