= Gonzaga–Washington State men's basketball rivalry =

American college basketball rivalry

- Gonzaga Bulldogs Washington State Cougars
- Sport: Basketball
- First meeting: December 16, 1907; Washington State. 21–18
- Latest meeting: February 10, 2026; Gonzaga, 83–53

Statistics
- Total meetings: 154
- All-time series: Washington State leads, 98–56 (.636)
- Largest victory: Washington State, 58–19 (1938)
- Longest win streak: Washington State, 15 (1936–1942)
- Current win streak: Gonzaga, 9 (2011–present)

Locations of Gonzaga and Washington State

The Gonzaga–Washington State men's basketball rivalry is an intrastate college basketball rivalry in eastern Washington between the Bulldogs of Gonzaga University in Spokane and the Cougars of Washington State University in Pullman. The universities are separated by just eighty miles (130 km) in the Inland Empire, and the series is one of the oldest in the West.

== Series overview ==
Gonzaga and Washington State have met a total of 152 times dating back to 1907. After last playing in 2015, the two teams renewed the rivalry in 2025 as West Coast Conference (WCC) foes. The Cougars dominated the series in the 20th century, with long winning streaks under head coaches Jack Friel, Marv Harshman, and George Raveling. The Zags have won 18 of the last 21 meetings, dating back to 1998. This trend in the series reflects Gonzaga's ascension from a mid-major program to a perennially ranked powerhouse, making trips to the NCAA tournament every year in the 2000s and 2010s.

Washington State holds a 49–22 lead as the home team, a 46–30 lead on the road, and a 3–2 lead in neutral site matchups. They have met once in postseason play, in the first round of the 1996 National Invitation Tournament (NIT), with WSU winning 92–73. In 2007, the matchup featured two ranked teams for the first and only time, with No. 8 Washington State prevailing 51–47 over No. 17 Gonzaga in Spokane, handing the Bulldogs their first-ever home loss while ranked.

== Hiatus ==
Washington State and Gonzaga met every season from 1921–22 to 1962–63 and every season from 1964–65 to 1986–87. The teams met again in each season from 2001–02 to 2015–16, before the series was suspended indefinitely.

== Renewal ==
With the collapse of the Pac-12 Conference after the 2023–24 season, Washington State basketball joined the WCC as an associate member, renewing the dormant rivalry. The Cougars and Bulldogs played twice in both the 2024–25 season and 2025–26 season as WCC rivals. WSU and Gonzaga basketball began play in a rebuilt Pac-12 in the 2026–27 season, where they continue to meet twice each season. Gonzaga appeared in two national championship games during the rivalry's hiatus, falling to North Carolina in 2017 and Baylor in 2021.

== Game results ==
Below is a complete list of series results, according to WSUCougars.com and GoZags.com. Rankings are from the AP Poll at the time of the game.

Gonzaga victories	Washington State victories	Tie games

No.	Date	Location	Winner	Score
1	1907	Spokane, WA	Washington State	21–18
2	1908	Spokane, WA	Washington State	23–17
3	1910	Spokane, WA	Washington State	23–18
4	1911	Spokane, WA	Gonzaga	20–12
5	1912	Spokane, WA	Gonzaga	23–17
6	1913	Spokane, WA	Washington State	26–23
7	1914	Spokane, WA	Gonzaga	32–28
8	1916	Pullman, WA	Washington State	43–18
9	1916	Spokane, WA	Washington State	19–14
10	1922	Pullman, WA	Washington State	31–19
11	1922	Spokane, WA	Washington State	24–21
12	1923	Pullman, WA	Washington State	29–10
13	1923	Pullman, WA	Washington State	31–14
14	1923	Spokane, WA	Gonzaga	27–25
15	1923	Spokane, WA	Washington State	28–18
16	1924*	Pullman, WA	Washington State	27–26
17	1924*	Spokane, WA	Washington State	38–26
18	1925*	Pullman, WA	Washington State	33–30
19	1925*	Spokane, WA	Washington State	42–33
20	1926	Pullman, WA	Gonzaga	28–26
21	1926	Spokane, WA	Gonzaga	33–19
22	1927	Pullman, WA	Washington State	36–16
23	1927	Spokane, WA	Washington State	28–21
24	1928	Pullman, WA	Gonzaga	28–25
25	1928	Spokane, WA	Gonzaga	34–28
26	1929	Pullman, WA	Washington State	33–29
27	1929	Spokane, WA	Gonzaga	33–27
28	1929	Pullman, WA	Gonzaga	35–33^{OT}
29	1930	Spokane, WA	Gonzaga	34–33
30	1930	Spokane, WA	Washington State	35–22
31	1931	Pullman, WA	Gonzaga	40–39
32	1931	Spokane, WA	Washington State	39–24
33	1931	Spokane, WA	Washington State	43–18
34	1932	Pullman, WA	Washington State	38–20
35	1932	Spokane, WA	Washington State	44–30
36	1933	Pullman, WA	Washington State	61–42
37	1933	Spokane, WA	Washington State	47–23
38	1934	Pullman, WA	Washington State	44–28
39	1934	Spokane, WA	Washington State	43–38
40	1935	Pullman, WA	Gonzaga	29–25
41	1936	Spokane, WA	Washington State	49–33
42	1936	Pullman, WA	Washington State	60–23
43	1937	Pullman, WA	Washington State	56–25
44	1937	Spokane, WA	Washington State	48–34
45	1937	Spokane, WA	Washington State	38–20
46	1938	Pullman, WA	Washington State	58–19
47	1938	Spokane, WA	Washington State	32–29
48	1939	Pullman, WA	Washington State	42–22
49	1940	Pullman, WA	Washington State	50–42
50	1940	Spokane, WA	Washington State	42–39
51	1940	Pullman, WA	Washington State	50–27
52	1942	Spokane, WA	Washington State	60–36
53	1942	Pullman, WA	Washington State	67–40
54	1942	Spokane, WA	Washington State	48–34
55	1942	Pullman, WA	Washington State	60–41
56	1943	Spokane, WA	Gonzaga	52–46
57	1944	Pullman, WA	Gonzaga	57–38
58	1944	Pullman, WA	Gonzaga	54–39
59	1944	Pullman, WA	Washington State	55–48
60	1945	Spokane, WA	Washington State	64–54
61	1945	Pullman, WA	Washington State	66–38
62	1945	Spokane, WA	Washington State	59–35
63	1946	Pullman, WA	Washington State	42–40
64	1946	Spokane, WA	Gonzaga	40–38
65	1947	Pullman, WA	Washington State	40–36
66	1948	Spokane, WA	Gonzaga	36–28
67	1948	Pullman, WA	Washington State	40–33
68	1949	Spokane, WA	Washington State	43–36
69	1950	Pullman, WA	Washington State	52–34
70	1950	Spokane, WA	Gonzaga	46–43
71	1950	Spokane, WA	Washington State	66–44
72	1951	Pullman, WA	Washington State	45–38
73	1951	Spokane, WA	Gonzaga	65–51
74	1951	Pullman, WA	Washington State	63–47
75	1952	Pullman, WA	Washington State	69–64
76	1953	Spokane, WA	Gonzaga	66–57
77	1953	Pullman, WA	Washington State	62–60
78	1953	Spokane, WA	Washington State	60–49

No.	Date	Location	Winner	Score
79	1954	Pullman, WA	Gonzaga	69–61
80	1955	Spokane, WA	Gonzaga	71–61
81	1955	Pullman, WA	Washington State	73–53
82	1956	Spokane, WA	Gonzaga	72–53
83	1956	Pullman, WA	Gonzaga	62–60
84	1957	Pullman, WA	Washington State	65–57
85	1958	Spokane, WA	Washington State	68–67
86	1958	Pullman, WA	Washington State	88–79
87	1959	Spokane, WA	Washington State	81–70
88	1959	Pullman, WA	Washington State	69–67
89	1960	Pullman, WA	Gonzaga	80–77
90	1961	Spokane, WA	Washington State	81–60
91	1961	Pullman, WA	Washington State	74–73^{OT}
92	1962	Spokane, WA	Gonzaga	74–61
93	1962	Pullman, WA	Washington State	70–66
94	1963	Spokane, WA	Gonzaga	73–56
95	1964	Pullman, WA	Gonzaga	72–71
96	1964	Spokane, WA	Gonzaga	54–49
97	1965	Spokane, WA	Washington State	106–78
98	1966	Pullman, WA	Gonzaga	97–82
99	1966	Pullman, WA	Washington State	72–70
100	1967	Spokane, WA	Washington State	69–64
101	1967	Pullman, WA	Washington State	95–66
102	1968	Spokane, WA	Washington State	101–70
103	1968	Spokane, WA	Washington State	91–64
104	1969	Pullman, WA	Washington State	85–61
105	1969	Pullman, WA	Washington State	85–69
106	1970	Spokane, WA	Washington State	73–66
107	1970	Spokane, WA	Washington State	81–70^{OT}
108	1970	Pullman, WA	Gonzaga	74–72
109	1971	Spokane, WA	Gonzaga	77–65
110	1971	Pullman, WA	Washington State	82–61
111	1972	Spokane, WA	Gonzaga	54–52
112	1973	Pullman, WA	Gonzaga	61–52
113	1973	Spokane, WA	Washington State	73–57
114	1975	Spokane, WA	Washington State	73–50
115	1976	Spokane, WA	Washington State	77–76^{OT}
116	1976	Pullman, WA	Washington State	66–57
117	1977	Spokane, WA	Washington State	58–52
118	1978	Spokane, WA	Washington State	66–63^{2OT}
119	1979	Spokane, WA	Washington State	75–48
120	1980	Spokane, WA	Washington State	63–52
121	1981	Spokane, WA	Washington State	53–44
122	1982	Spokane, WA	Washington State	75–53
123	1983	Spokane, WA	Washington State	73–72
124	1983	Portland, OR	Gonzaga	71–70^{OT}
125	1984	Pullman, WA	Washington State	62–56
126	1985	Spokane, WA	Washington State	64–61
127	1986	Spokane, WA	Washington State	64–56
128	1986	Pullman, WA	Gonzaga	59–58
129	1988	Spokane, WA	Gonzaga	64–63
130	1995	Spokane, WA	Washington State	72–67^{OT}
131	1996	Pullman, WA	Washington State	92–73
132	1996	Spokane, WA	Washington State	75–62
133	1997	Pullman, WA	Washington State	85–70
134	1998	Spokane, WA	Gonzaga	70–61
135	1999	Spokane, WA	#25 Gonzaga	73–63
136	2001	Spokane, WA	#25 Gonzaga	67–44
137	2002	Pullman, WA	Gonzaga	110–104^{OT}
138	2003	Spokane, WA	#15 Gonzaga	96–58
139	2004	Pullman, WA	#25 Gonzaga	54–52
140	2005	Spokane, WA	#9 Gonzaga	67–53
141	2006	Pullman, WA	Washington State	77–67
142	2007	Spokane, WA	#8 Washington State	51–47
143	2008	Pullman, WA	#4 Gonzaga	74–52
144	2009	Spokane, WA	#17 Gonzaga	74–69
145	2010	Pullman, WA	Washington State	81–59
146	2011	Spokane, WA	#22 Gonzaga	89–81
147	2012	Pullman, WA	#10 Gonzaga	71–69
148	2013	Spokane, WA	#13 Gonzaga	90–74
149	2014	Pullman, WA	#9 Gonzaga	81–66
150	2015	Spokane, WA	#13 Gonzaga	69–60
151	2025	Spokane, WA	#18 Gonzaga	88–75
152	2025	Pullman, WA	Gonzaga	84–63
153	2026	Pullman, WA	#9 Gonzaga	86–65
154	2026	Spokane, WA	#12 Gonzaga	83–53
Series: Washington State leads 98–56 * Northwest Conference games
