= Michael Rataj =

German basketball player (born 2003)

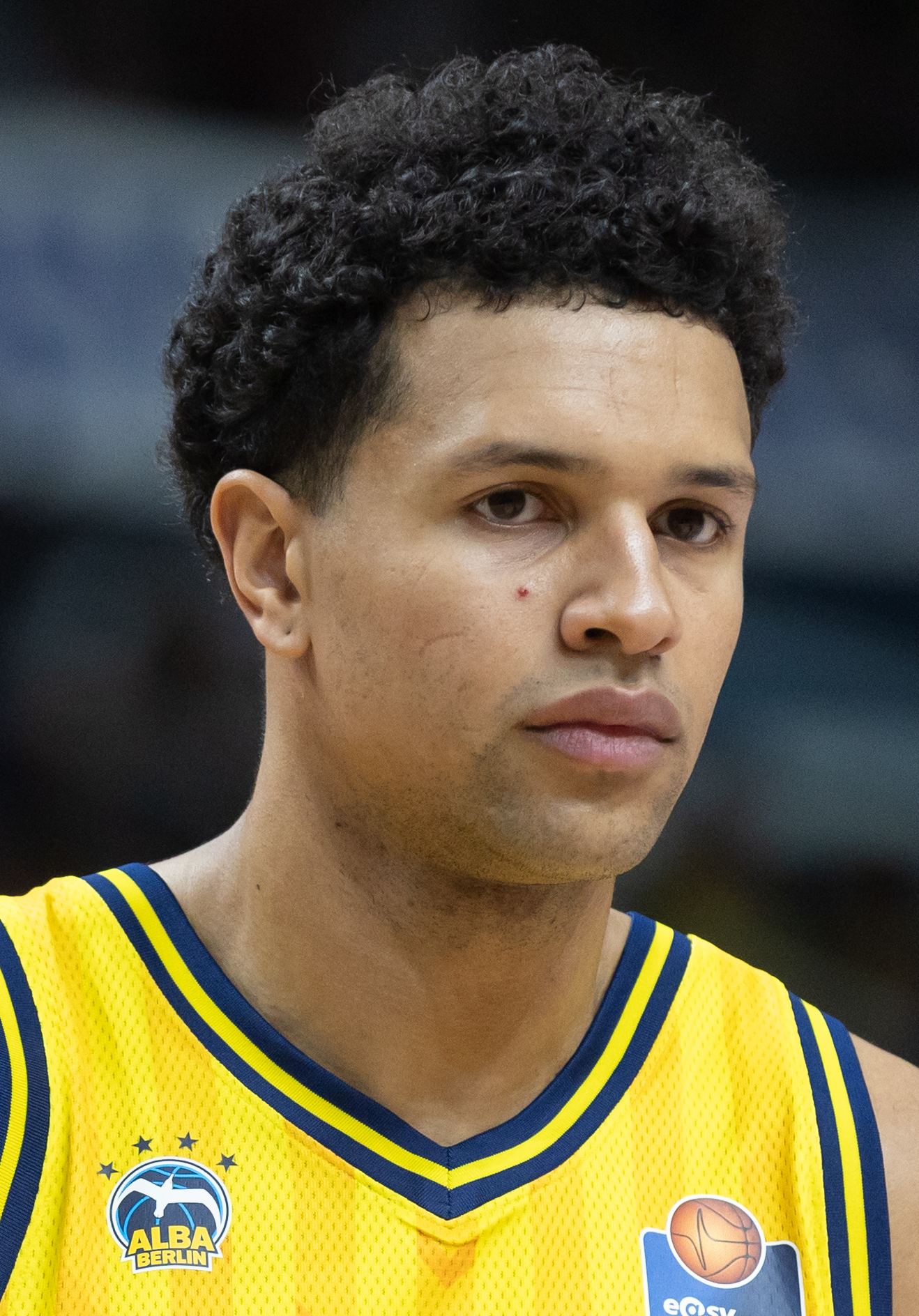
- Rataj with Alba Berlin in 2026

No. 12 – Ratiopharm Ulm
- Position: Power forward
- League: Basketball Bundesliga; EuroCup

Personal information
- Born: 12 October 2003 (age 23)
- Listed height: 6 ft 9 in (2.06 m)
- Listed weight: 220 lb (100 kg)

Career information
- College: Oregon State (2022–2025); Baylor (2025–2026)
- Playing career: 2019–present

Career history
- 2019–2021: Bayern Munich II
- 2021–2022: OrangeAcademy
- 2021–2022: Ratiopharm Ulm
- 2026: Alba Berlin
- 2026–present: Ratiopharm Ulm

Career highlights
- First-team All-WCC (2025)

Michael Rataj (born 12 October 2003) is a German professional basketball player for Ratiopharm Ulm of the Basketball Bundesliga (BBL) and the EuroCup. He played college basketball at Oregon State and Baylor.

== Early life ==
Rataj grew up in Augsburg, Germany. He represented Germany at the 2021 FIBA U18 European Challengers, averaging 15 points, 3.8 rebounds and 1.4 steals per game. After beginning his career with Bayern Munich, Rataj split time between OrangeAcademy and Ratiopharm Ulm, becoming the second youngest player to compete in the EuroCup. In 2021, he committed to play college basketball at Oregon State University.

== College career ==
During his first two seasons, Rataj averaged 6.1 points and 4.1 rebounds as a freshman and 8.3 points and a team-high 5.8 rebounds as a sophomore. As a junior, Rataj began to have a breakout season, doubling his scoring production. Against No. 16 Gonzaga, he scored 29 points, helping lead the Beavers to a 97–89 upset win in overtime. For his performance, he was named the West Coast Conference co-player of the week, becoming the first Beaver to be named conference player of the week twice during a single season since Roberto Nelson during the 2013–14 season. Against Santa Clara, he scored a career-high 30 points in an 83–69 victory.

Following the 2024-25 season, Rataj transferred to Baylor for his final season of eligibility.

== Professional career ==
On April 15, 2026, he signed with Alba Berlin of the German Basketball Bundesliga (BBL).

On July 14, 2026, he signed with Ratiopharm Ulm of the Basketball Bundesliga (BBL).

== Career statistics ==
Legend
GP	Games played	GS	Games started	MPG	Minutes per game
FG%	Field goal percentage	3P%	3-point field goal percentage	FT%	Free throw percentage
RPG	Rebounds per game	APG	Assists per game	SPG	Steals per game
BPG	Blocks per game	PPG	Points per game	**Bold**	Career high

=== College ===
Year	Team	GP	GS	MPG	FG%	3P%	FT%	RPG	APG	SPG	BPG	PPG
2022–23	Oregon State	32	16	20.9	.438	.373	.596	4.1	1.0	.7	.3	6.1
2023–24	Oregon State	29	23	28.0	.443	.288	.738	5.8	1.6	.9	.5	8.3
2024–25	Oregon State	32	32	32.4	.484	.351	.788	7.2	2.0	1.6	.6	16.9
2025–26	Baylor	34	19	23.1	.423	.218	.707	4.6	1.7	.5	.4	7.2
