= Nikola Šaranović (basketball) =

Serbian basketball player (born 2003)

No. 10 – Studentski centar
- Position: Small forward
- League: Prva A Liga; ABA League

Personal information
- Born: 20 August 2003 (age 23) Belgrade, Serbia and Montenegro
- Listed height: 2.00 m (6 ft 7 in)
- Listed weight: 86 kg (190 lb)

Career information
- Playing career: 2021–present

Career history
- 2021–2025: FMP
- 2025–present: Studentski centar

Career highlights
- Serbian Cup winner (2021)
Medals
Men's basketball
Representing Serbia
U20 European Championship Division B
| Gold medal – first place | 2022 Georgia | Team |

Nikola Šaranović (Serbian Cyrillic: Никола Шарановић; born 20 August 2003) is a Serbian professional basketball player for Studentski centar of the Prva A Liga and the ABA League.

== Early life ==
Šaranović grew up with the Crvena zvezda youth system. In December 2020, he recorded a triple-double in a 101–60 win over the Smederevo 1953 Junior team making 21 points, 10 rebounds, 14 steals, and 7 assists.

== Playing career ==
In February 2021, head coach Dejan Radonjić added Šaranović to the Crvena zvezda mts roster for the 2021 Radivoj Korać Cup tournament in Novi Sad. Following a win over Mega Soccerbet in the Cup Finals, the Zvezda won its 10th National cup title while Šaranović won his first trophy. He never played a single game at the Cup tournament. On 19 February, Šaranović was a member of the Zvezda roster for a EuroLeague game with Zenit Saint Petersburg without any played time.

On 25 August 2021, Šaranović officially signed a four-year professional contract with FMP.

== National team career ==
Šaranović was a member of the Serbian under-16 national team that participated at the 2019 FIBA U16 European Championship in Udine, Italy. Over seven tournament games, he averaged 7.1 points, three rebounds and 1.6 assists per game.

In July 2022, Šaranović was a member of the Serbian under-20 national team that won a gold medal at the 2022 FIBA U20 European Championship Division B in Tbilisi, Georgia. Over seven tournament games, he averaged 6.1 points, 2.1 rebounds, and 3.0 assists per game.
