= Film Resource Unit =

South African indie film distributor

Film Resource Unit (FRU) was an independent film distributor and promoter of African cinema in Johannesburg, South Africa, from 1986 to 2008.

FRU was founded in 1986. Over the years, it became a worldwide distributor of African films. Next to its function as a film distributor, the FRU also took up a role in society. During the apartheid years, it showed films that were forbidden by the white authorities. It also showed films and arranged workshops in areas where there was a lack of audio-visual media, often choosing subjects of social value, such as domestic violence and HIV/AIDS.

The organization set up video resource centers where videos could be bought, rented, and viewed. It also introduced a marketing and film training program for unemployed South Africans, whose films were shown at film festivals organized by the FRU.

Film Resource United was honoured with a Prince Claus Award from the Netherlands in 2000, for being a company that was active on a wide range of social development areas.

In June 2007, in response to a threatened liquidation and closure of FRU, the Pan African Federation of Filmmakers (FEPACI) called for an investigation. According to FEPACI's statement, the FRU is not only a major distributor of African films, but also "a political, ideological platform that creates a sense of pride and resonance that Africa can stand by itself and can initiate, own and control instruments of change and transformation". The organization declared insolvency in 2007 and was formally shut down in 2008.
