= Paulin Soumanou Vieyra =

Beninese-Senegalese film director (1925–1987)

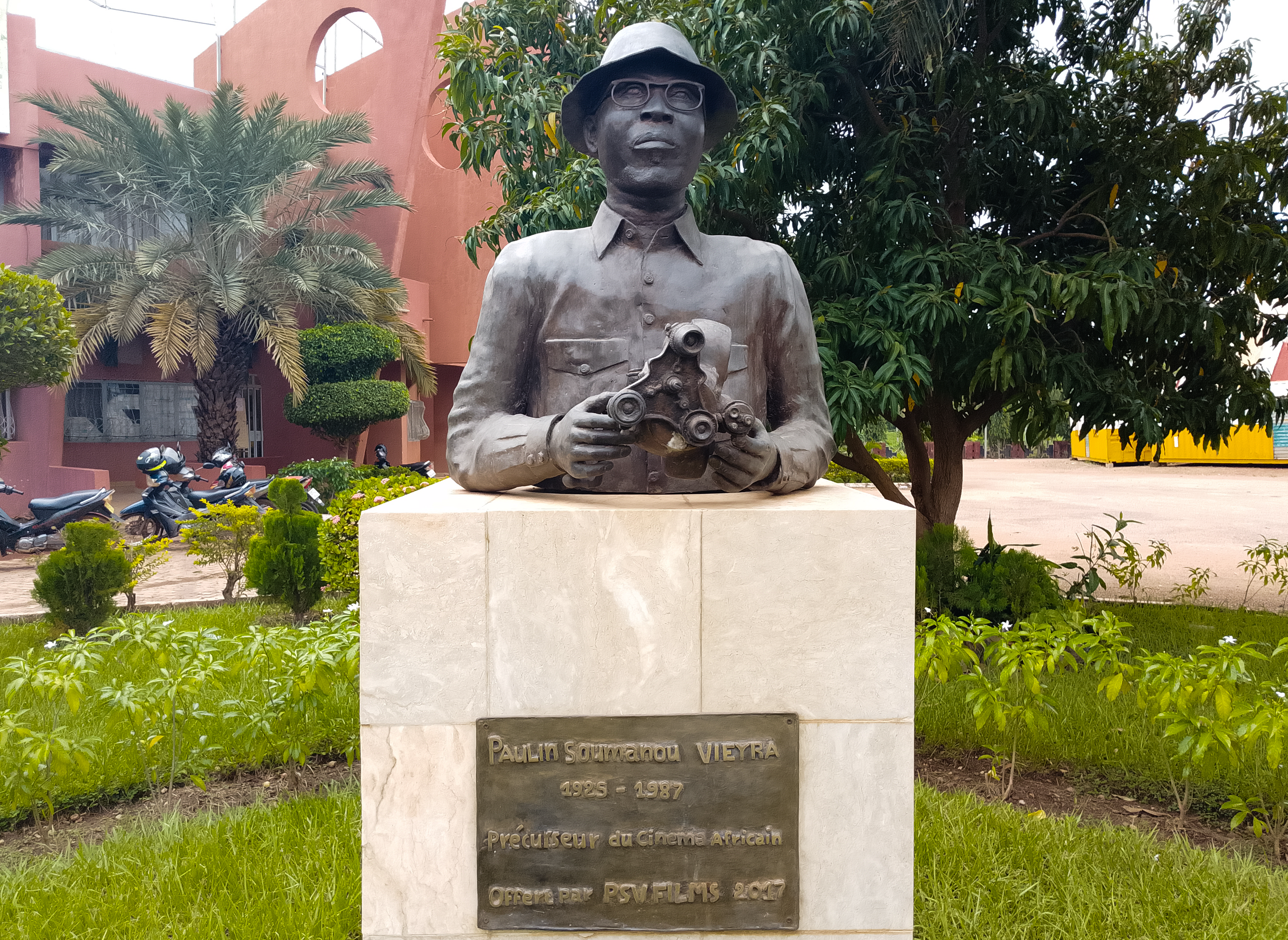
- Born: 31 January 1925; Porto-Novo, Dahomey
- Died: 4 November 1987 (aged 62); Paris, France
- Citizenship: Senegalese
- Education: Institut des hautes études cinématographiques
- Occupation: Film director
- Years active: 1954–1982
- Known for: Founder of Fédération Panafricaine des Cinéastes
- Notable work: Afrique-sur-Seine
- Spouse: Myriam Warner

Paulin Soumanou Vieyra (31 January 1925 – 4 November 1987) was a Beninese-Senegalese film director and historian. As he lived in Senegal after the age of 10, he is more associated with that nation. He is known for his 1955 film Afrique-sur-Seine, the first Francophone African film.

== Early life and education ==
Paulin Soumanou Vieyra was born on 31 January 1925 in Porto-Novo, Dahomey.

He was educated in Paris, France, where he studied at the Institut des hautes études cinématographiques.

== Career ==
In 1955 in Paris, Vieyra shot the first Francophone African film, Afrique-sur-Seine.

His other important achievements for film in Africa include being one of the co-founders of the Fédération Panafricaine des Cinéastes (FEPACI) in 1969.

He served as director of Actualités Sénégalaises, an important newsreel service in the two decades following Senegal’s Independence.

In 1971, Vieyra was a member of the jury at the 7th Moscow International Film Festival. Two years later, he was a member of the jury at the 8th Moscow International Film Festival. In 1985 he was a member of the jury at the 14th Moscow International Film Festival.

== Death ==
He died in Paris on 4 November 1987, at the age of 62. His papers have been donated by his son, Stéphane Vieyra, to Indiana University's Black Film Center and Archive.

== Works ==
=== Films ===
- 1954 : C'était il y a quatre ans
- 1955 : Afrique-sur-Seine
- 1957 : L'Afrique à Moscou
- 1958 : Le Niger aujourd’hui
- 1959 : Les présidents Senghor et Modibo Keita; Avec les Africaines à Vienne; Présence Africaine à Rome
- 1960 : Indépendance du Cameroun, Togo, Congo, Madagascar
- 1961 : Une nation est née
- 1963 : Lamb; Voyage du président Senghor en Italie; Voyage présidentiel en URSS
- 1964 : Avec l’ensemble national; Écrit du Caire; Sindiely; Voyage du président Senghor au Brésil
- 1965 : N'Diongane
- 1966 : Le Sénégal au festival national des arts nègres; Môl
- 1967 : Au marché; La bicyclette; Le gâteau; Le rendez-vous
- 1974 : Écrit de Dakar; L’art plastique
- 1976 : L'Habitat rural au Sénégal; L’Habitat urbain au Sénégal
- 1981 : Birago Diop; En résidence surveillée, L’envers du décor; Les oiseaux
- 1982 : Iba N'diaye

=== Books ===
- Le Cinéma et l'Afrique, 1969
- Sembène Ousmane cinéaste, 1972
- Le Cinéma africain des origines à 1973, 1975
- Le Cinéma au Sénégal, 1983
