= Mihailo Petrović (basketball) =

Serbian basketball player (born 2003)

No. 17 – Seton Hall Pirates
- Position: Point guard

Personal information
- Born: 23 February 2003 (age 23) Prokuplje, Serbia
- Listed height: 6 ft 3 in (1.91 m)
- Listed weight: 180 lb (82 kg)

Career information
- College: Illinois (2025–2026); Seton Hall (2026–present)

Career history
- 2021–2023: Partizan
- 2021–2022: →Dunav
- 2022–2023: →Borac Čačak
- 2023–2024: OKK Beograd
- 2024–2025: Mega

Mihailo Petrović (Serbian Cyrillic: Михаило Петровић; [mǐxailo pětroʋitɕ]; born 23 February 2003) is a Serbian college basketball player for the Seton Hall Pirates of the Big East Conference. He previously played for the Illinois Fighting Illini.

== Early life and youth career ==
Born in Prokuplje, Petrović rose through the youth ranks of Partizan before loan spells with Dunav and Borac Čačak. He also represented Serbia at youth international levels, including the U16, U19, and U20 European Championships, and debuted for the senior national team during the EuroBasket 2025 qualifiers.

== Professional career ==
=== Partizan and early loans (2020–2023) ===
Petrović began his professional career with Partizan in 2020. He was later loaned to Dunav and Borac Čačak during the 2022–23 season.

=== OKK Beograd (2023–2024) ===
In the 2023–24 season with OKK Beograd, Petrović averaged 21.2 points and 6.8 assists per game, with a player index rating of 22.1 over 25 appearances. His performances ranked him sixth in league efficiency and led to his transfer to Mega Superbet.

=== Mega (2024–2025) ===
Ahead of the 2024–25 season, Petrović joined Mega Superbet. He averaged 14.3 points and 7.3 assists per game, earning MVP awards for round 19 (23 points, 15 assists) and round 28 (28 points, 13 assists) of the ABA League.

== National team ==
Petrović debuted for the Serbian senior national team in November 2024 during the EuroBasket 2025 qualification window in Copenhagen, contributing 4 points.

== NCAA commitment ==
In April 2025, Petrović announced his commitment to the University of Illinois, joining the team for the 2025–26 NCAA season. The NCAA determined he would have three years of eligibility, thus making his first season his sophomore season.

Following the season's conclusion, he transferred to Seton Hall for his junior season.

== Career statistics ==
=== Club performance ===
Regular season statistics
Season	Team	League	Games	Points per game	Assists per game	Rebounds per game	Steals per game
2024–25	Mega Superbet	ABA League	25	12.4	5.8	3.1	1.4
2023–24	OKK Beograd	Basketball League of Serbia	30	11.2	4.6	2.8	1.1
2022–23	Borac Čačak (loan)	Basketball League of Serbia	18	9.5	3.9	2.3	0.9

=== College ===
Year	Team	GP	GS	MPG	FG%	3P%	FT%	RPG	APG	SPG	BPG	PPG
2025–26	Illinois	19	0	5.7	.333	.200	.833	0.7	1.1	0.2	0.0	1.6
