= Sananda Fru =

German basketball player (born 2003)

No. 11 – Marquette Golden Eagles
- Position: Power forward / center
- Conference: Big East Conference

Personal information
- Born: 28 August 2003 (age 23) Berlin, Germany
- Listed height: 6 ft 11 in (2.11 m)
- Listed weight: 250 lb (113 kg)

Career information
- High school: Christophorusschule Braunschweig
- College: Louisville (2025–2026); Marquette (2026–present)
- Playing career: 2020–2025

Career history
- 2020–2025: Löwen Braunschweig

Career highlights
- All-Bundesliga First Team (2025); Bundesliga Best Young Player (2025)

Sananda Fru (born 28 August 2003) is a German college basketball player for the Marquette Golden Eagles of the Big East Conference. He previously played for the Louisville Cardinals.

== Early life and youth career ==
Fru was born in Berlin, Germany, and developed his skills in the youth programs of DBC Berlin, ASV Moabit, DBV Charlottenburg, and Berlin Tiger. In 2020, he joined the youth academy of Basketball Löwen Braunschweig and also played for SG Braunschweig in the 2. Regionalliga on a dual license.

== Professional career ==
Fru made his professional debut in the BBL in April 2021 in a game against Ratiopharm Ulm. Over the next four seasons, he developed into a regular starter for Braunschweig. During the 2024–25 season, Fru averaged 12.6 points, 6.2 rebounds, and 1.4 blocks per game with a 64.5% field goal percentage. He was named the BBL’s Best Young Player that season.

In June 2025, Fru officially committed to play college basketball at the University of Louisville, joining the ACC team for the 2025–26 NCAA season.

== National team career ==
Fru has represented Germany at the junior level. He played in the FIBA U20 European Championship in both 2022 and 2023, averaging 7.9 points and 6.1 rebounds in 2022, and 8.3 points and 5.7 rebounds in 2023.
