= Tómas Valur Þrastarson =

Icelandic basketball player (born 2005)

No. 5 – Washington State Cougars
- Position: Shooting guard / small forward
- Conference: Pac-12 Conference

Personal information
- Born: 19 September 2005 (age 20)
- Listed height: 201 cm (6 ft 7 in)
- Listed weight: 98 kg (216 lb)

Career information
- College: Washington State (2024–present)
- Playing career: 2020–present

Career history
- 2020–2024: Þór Þorlákshöfn

Career highlights
- Icelandic champion (2021); Icelandic Super Cup (2021); Úrvalsdeild Domestic All-First team (2024); 2x Úrvalsdeild Young Player of the Year (2023, 2024); WCC All-Freshman team (2025)

Tómas Valur Þrastarson (19 September 2005) is an Icelandic college basketball player for the Washington State Cougars of the Pac-12 Conference. Internationally, he represents the Iceland national team. In 2021, he won the Icelandic championship with Þór Þorlákshöfn.

Following the 2023–2024 Úrvalsdeild season, where he averaged 17.0 points per game, Tómas joined Washington State University. In March 2025, he was named to the West Coast Conference All-Freshman team.

== National team career ==
In 2024, Tómas was selected to the Nordic U-20 championships All-tournament team after averaging 19.3 points, 7.3 rebounds and 1.3 blocks, helping Iceland U-20 to the Nordic championship.

In February 2024, Tómas was selected to the Iceland senior national team for the first time.

== Personal life ==
Tómas is the younger brother of basketball player Styrmir Snær Þrastarson.
